= 2024 in motorsport =

The following is an overview of the events of 2024 in motorsport, including the major racing events, motorsport venues that were opened and closed during a year, championships and non-championship events that were established and disestablished in a year, and births and deaths of racing drivers and other motorsport people.

== Established championships/events ==
=== 2024 Formula One World Championship ===
- March 2: 2024 Bahrain Grand Prix in Sakhir
  - Winner: (Netherlands) Max Verstappen (Oracle Red Bull Racing)
- March 9: 2024 Saudi Arabian Grand Prix in (Saudi Arabia) Jeddah
  - Winner: (Netherlands) Max Verstappen (Oracle Red Bull Racing)
- March 24: 2024 Australian Grand Prix in (Australia) Melbourne
  - Winner: (Spain) Carlos Sainz Jr. (Scuderia Ferrari)
- April 7: 2024 Japanese Grand Prix in (Japan) Suzuka, Mie
  - Winner: (Netherlands) Max Verstappen (Oracle Red Bull Racing)
- April 21: 2024 Chinese Grand Prix in (China) Shanghai
  - Winner: (Netherlands) Max Verstappen (Oracle Red Bull Racing)
- May 5: 2024 Miami Grand Prix in (United States) Miami Gardens, Florida
  - Winner: (United Kingdom) Lando Norris (McLaren)
- May 19: 2024 Emilia Romagna Grand Prix in (Italy) Imola
  - Winner: (Netherlands) Max Verstappen (Oracle Red Bull Racing)
- May 26: 2024 Monaco Grand Prix in Monte Carlo
  - Winner: (Monaco) Charles Leclerc (Scuderia Ferrari)
- June 9: 2024 Canadian Grand Prix in (Canada) Montreal
  - Winner: (Netherlands) Max Verstappen (Oracle Red Bull Racing)
- June 23: 2024 Spanish Grand Prix in (Spain) Barcelona
  - Winner: (Netherlands) Max Verstappen (Oracle Red Bull Racing)
- June 30: 2024 Austrian Grand Prix in (Austria) Spielberg, Styria
  - Winner: (United Kingdom) George Russell (Mercedes-AMG Petronas F1 Team)
- July 7: 2024 British Grand Prix in (United Kingdom) Silverstone
  - Winner: (United Kingdom) Lewis Hamilton (Mercedes-AMG Petronas F1 Team)
- July 21: 2024 Hungarian Grand Prix in (Hungary) Budapest
  - Winner: (Australia) Oscar Piastri (McLaren)
- July 28: 2024 Belgian Grand Prix in (Belgium) Stavelot
  - Winner: (United Kingdom) Lewis Hamilton (Mercedes-AMG Petronas F1 Team)
- August 25: 2024 Dutch Grand Prix in (Netherlands) Zandvoort
  - Winner: (United Kingdom) Lando Norris (McLaren)
- September 1: 2024 Italian Grand Prix in (Italy) Monza
  - Winner: (Monaco) Charles Leclerc (Scuderia Ferrari)
- September 15: 2024 Azerbaijan Grand Prix in Baku
  - Winner: (Australia) Oscar Piastri (McLaren)
- September 22: 2024 Singapore Grand Prix in Marina Bay, Singapore
  - Winner: (United Kingdom) Lando Norris (McLaren)
- October 20: 2024 United States Grand Prix in Austin, Texas
  - Winner: (Monaco) Charles Leclerc (Scuderia Ferrari)
- October 27: 2024 Mexico City Grand Prix in Mexico City
  - Winner: (Spain) Carlos Sainz Jr. (Scuderia Ferrari)
- November 3: 2024 São Paulo Grand Prix in (Brazil) São Paulo
  - Winner: (Netherlands) Max Verstappen (Oracle Red Bull Racing)
- November 23: 2024 Las Vegas Grand Prix in (United States) Las Vegas
  - Winner: (United Kingdom) George Russell (Mercedes-AMG Petronas F1 Team)
- December 1: 2024 Qatar Grand Prix in Lusail
  - Winner: (Netherlands) Max Verstappen (Oracle Red Bull Racing)
- December 8: 2024 Abu Dhabi Grand Prix (final) in (United Arab Emirates) Yas Island
  - Winner: (United Kingdom) Lando Norris (McLaren)

=== 2023–24 Formula E World Championship ===
- January 13: 2024 Mexico City ePrix in Mexico
  - Winner: (Germany) Pascal Wehrlein ( (Germany) Tag Heuer Porsche Formula E Team)
- January 26: 2024 Diriyah ePrix #1 at the (Saudi Arabia) Riyadh Street Circuit
  - Winner: (United Kingdom) Jake Dennis ( (United States) Andretti Autosport)
- January 27: 2024 Diriyah ePrix #2 at the (Saudi Arabia) Riyadh Street Circuit
  - Winner: (New Zealand) Nick Cassidy ( (United Kingdom) Jaguar Racing)
- March 16: 2024 São Paulo ePrix (March) at the (Brazil) São Paulo Street Circuit
  - Winner: (United Kingdom) Sam Bird ( (United Kingdom) NEOM McLaren Formula E Team)
- March 30: 2024 Tokyo ePrix at the (Japan) Tokyo Street Circuit (debut event)
  - Winner: (Germany) Maximilian Günther ( (Monaco) Maserati MSG Racing)
- April 13: 2024 Misano ePrix #1 at the (Italy) Misano World Circuit Marco Simoncelli
  - Winner: (United Kingdom) Oliver Rowland ( (Japan) Nissan Formula E Team)
- April 14: 2024 Misano ePrix #2 at the (Italy) Misano World Circuit Marco Simoncelli
  - Winner: (Germany) Pascal Wehrlein ( (Germany) TAG Heuer Porsche Formula E Team)
- April 27: 2024 Monaco ePrix in Monte Carlo
  - Winner: (New Zealand) Mitch Evans ( (United Kingdom) Jaguar TCS Racing)
- May 11: 2024 Berlin ePrix #1 at the (Germany) Tempelhof Airport Street Circuit
  - Winner: (New Zealand) Nick Cassidy ( (United Kingdom) Jaguar TCS Racing)
- May 12: 2024 Berlin ePrix #2 at the (Germany) Tempelhof Airport Street Circuit
  - Winner: (Portugal) António Félix da Costa ( (Germany) Tag Heuer Porsche Formula E Team)
- May 25: 2024 Shanghai ePrix #1 at the (China) Shanghai International Circuit
  - Winner: (New Zealand) Mitch Evans ( (United Kingdom) Jaguar TCS Racing)
- May 26: 2024 Shanghai ePrix #2 at the (China) Shanghai International Circuit
  - Winner: (Portugal) António Félix da Costa ( (Germany) Tag Heuer Porsche Formula E Team)
- June 29: 2024 Portland ePrix #1 at the (United States) Portland International Raceway
  - Winner: (Portugal) António Félix da Costa ( (Germany) Tag Heuer Porsche Formula E Team)
- June 30: 2024 Portland ePrix #2 at the (United States) Portland International Raceway
  - Winner: (Portugal) António Félix da Costa ( (Germany) Tag Heuer Porsche Formula E Team)
- July 20: 2024 London ePrix #1 (final) at the (United Kingdom) ExCeL London Circuit
  - Winner: (Germany) Pascal Wehrlein ( (Germany) Tag Heuer Porsche Formula E Team)
- July 21: 2024 London ePrix #2 (final) at the (United Kingdom) ExCeL London Circuit
  - Winner: (United Kingdom) Oliver Rowland ( (Japan) Nissan Formula E Team)

=== 2024–25 Formula E World Championship ===
- December 7: 2024 São Paulo ePrix (December) at the (Brazil) São Paulo Street Circuit
  - Winner: (New Zealand) Mitch Evans ( (United Kingdom) Jaguar TCS Racing)

=== 2024 FIA World Endurance Championship ===
- March 2: Qatar 1812 km
  - Hypercar winners: (Germany) Porsche Penske Motorsport ( (France) Kévin Estre, (Germany) André Lotterer, (Belgium) Laurens Vanthoor)
  - LMGT3 winners: (Lithuania) Manthey PureRxcing ( (Austria) Klaus Bachler, (Saint Kitts and Nevis) Alex Malykhin, (Germany) Joel Sturm)
- April 21: (Italy) 6 Hours of Imola
  - Hypercar winners: (Japan) Toyota Gazoo Racing ( (United Kingdom) Mike Conway, (Japan) Kamui Kobayashi, (Netherlands) Nyck de Vries)
  - LMGT3 winners: (Belgium) Team WRT ( (Brazil) Augusto Farfus, (Indonesia) Sean Gelael, (United Kingdom) Darren Leung)
- May 11: (Belgium) 6 Hours of Spa-Francorchamps
  - Hypercar winners: (United Kingdom) Hertz Team Jota ( (United Kingdom) Callum Ilott, (United Kingdom) Will Stevens)
  - LMGT3 winners: (Germany) Manthey EMA ( (Austria) Richard Lietz, (Netherlands) Morris Schuring, (Australia) Yasser Shahin)
- June 15–16: (France) 24 Hours of Le Mans
  - Hypercar winners: (Italy) Ferrari AF Corse ( (Italy) Antonio Fuoco, (Spain) Miguel Molina, (Denmark) Nicklas Nielsen)
  - LMGT3 winners: (Germany) Manthey EMA ( (Austria) Richard Lietz, (Netherlands) Morris Schuring, (Australia) Yasser Shahin)
- July 14: (Brazil) 6 Hours of São Paulo
  - Hypercar winners: (Japan) Toyota Gazoo Racing ( (Switzerland) Sébastien Buemi, (New Zealand) Brendon Hartley, (Japan) Ryō Hirakawa)
  - LMGT3 winners: (Lithuania) Manthey PureRxcing ( (Austria) Klaus Bachler, (Saint Kitts and Nevis) Alex Malykhin, (Germany) Joel Sturm)
- September 1: (United States) Lone Star Le Mans
  - Hypercar winners: (Italy) AF Corse ( (Poland) Robert Kubica, (Israel) Robert Shwartzman, (China) Yifei Ye)
  - LMGT3 winners: (United States) Heart of Racing Team ( (United Kingdom) Ian James, (Italy) Daniel Mancinelli, (Spain) Alex Riberas)
- September 15: (Japan) 6 Hours of Fuji
  - Hypercar winners: (Germany) Porsche Penske Motorsport ( (France) Kévin Estre, (Germany) André Lotterer, (Belgium) Laurens Vanthoor)
  - LMGT3 winners: (Italy) Vista AF Corse ( (Italy) Francesco Castellacci, (Switzerland) Thomas Flohr, (Italy) Davide Rigon)
- November 2: 8 Hours of Bahrain
  - Hypercar winners: (Japan) Toyota Gazoo Racing ( (Switzerland) Sébastien Buemi, (New Zealand) Brendon Hartley, (Japan) Ryō Hirakawa)
  - LMGT3 winners: (Italy) Vista AF Corse ( (Italy) Francesco Castellacci, (Switzerland) Thomas Flohr, (Italy) Davide Rigon)

=== 2024 MotoGP World Championship ===
- March 10: Grand Prix of Qatar
  - MotoGP winner: (Italy) Francesco Bagnaia (Ducati)
  - Moto 2 winner: (Spain) Alonso López (Boscoscuro)
  - Moto 3 winner: (Colombia) David Alonso (CFMoto)
- March 24: Grande Prémio Tissot de Portugal
  - MotoGP winner: (Spain) Jorge Martín (Ducati)
  - Moto 2 winner: (Spain) Arón Canet (Kalex)
  - Moto 3 winner: (Spain) Daniel Holgado (Gas Gas)
- April 14: (United States) Red Bull Grand Prix of the Americas
  - MotoGP winner: (Spain) Maverick Viñales (Aprilia)
  - Moto 2 winner: (Spain) Sergio García (Boscoscuro)
  - Moto 3 winner: (Colombia) David Alonso (CFMoto)
- April 28: (Spain) Gran Premio de España
  - MotoGP winner: (Italy) Francesco Bagnaia (Ducati)
  - Moto 2 winner: (Spain) Fermín Aldeguer (Boscoscuro)
  - Moto 3 winner: (Netherlands) Collin Veijer (Husqvarna)
- May 12: Grand Prix de France
  - MotoGP winner: (Spain) Jorge Martín (Ducati)
  - Moto 2 winner: (Spain) Sergio García (Boscoscuro)
  - Moto 3 winner: (Colombia) David Alonso (CFMoto)
- May 26: (Spain) Gran Premi Monster Energy de Catalunya
  - MotoGP winner: (Italy) Francesco Bagnaia (Ducati)
  - Moto 2 winner: (Japan) Ai Ogura (Boscoscuro)
  - Moto 3 winner: (Colombia) David Alonso (CFMoto)
- June 2: (Italy) Gran Premio d'Italia
  - MotoGP winner: (Italy) Francesco Bagnaia (Ducati)
  - Moto 2 winner: (United States) Joe Roberts (Kalex)
  - Moto 3 winner: (Colombia) David Alonso (CFMoto)
- June 30: (Netherlands) Motul TT Assen
  - MotoGP winner: (Italy) Francesco Bagnaia (Ducati)
  - Moto 2 winner: (Japan) Ai Ogura (Boscoscuro)
  - Moto 3 winner: (Spain) Iván Ortolá (KTM)
- July 7: (Germany) Liqui Moly Motorrad Grand Prix Deutschland
  - MotoGP winner: (Italy) Francesco Bagnaia (Ducati)
  - Moto 2 winner: (Spain) Fermín Aldeguer (Boscoscuro)
  - Moto 3 winner: (Colombia) David Alonso (CFMoto)
- August 4: (United Kingdom) Monster Energy British Grand Prix
  - MotoGP winner: (Italy) Enea Bastianini (Ducati)
  - Moto 2 winner: (United Kingdom) Jake Dixon (Kalex)
  - Moto 3 winner: (Spain) Iván Ortolá (CFMoto)
- August 18: (Austria) Motorrad Grand Prix von Österreich
  - MotoGP winner: (Italy) Francesco Bagnaia (Ducati)
  - Moto 2 winner: (Italy) Celestino Vietti (Kalex)
  - Moto 3 winner: (Colombia) David Alonso (CFMoto)
- September 1: (Aragon) Gran Premio de Aragón
  - MotoGP winner: (Spain) Marc Márquez (Ducati)
  - Moto 2 winner: (United Kingdom) Jake Dixon (Kalex)
  - Moto 3 winner: (Spain) José Antonio Rueda (KTM)
- September 8: Gran Premio Red Bull di San Marino e della Riviera di Rimini
  - MotoGP winner: (Spain) Marc Márquez (Ducati)
  - Moto 2 winner: (Japan) Ai Ogura (Boscoscuro)
  - Moto 3 winner: (Spain) Ángel Piqueras (Honda)
- September 22: (Italy) Gran Premio Pramac dell'Emilia-Romagna
  - MotoGP winner: (Italy) Enea Bastianini (Ducati)
  - Moto 2 winner: (Italy) Celestino Vietti (Kalex)
  - Moto 3 winner: (Colombia) David Alonso (CFMoto)
- September 29: Pertamina Grand Prix of Indonesia
  - MotoGP winner: (Spain) Jorge Martín (Ducati)
  - Moto 2 winner: (Spain) Arón Canet (Kalex)
  - Moto 3 winner: (Colombia) David Alonso (CFMoto)
- October 6: Motul Grand Prix of Japan
  - MotoGP winner: (Italy) Francesco Bagnaia (Ducati)
  - Moto 2 winner: (Spain) Manuel González (Kalex)
  - Moto 3 winner: (Colombia) David Alonso (CFMoto)
- October 20: (Australia) Australian Motorcycle Grand Prix
  - MotoGP winner: (Spain) Marc Márquez (Ducati)
  - Moto 2 winner: (Spain) Fermín Aldeguer (Boscoscuro)
  - Moto 3 winner: (Colombia) David Alonso (CFMoto)
- October 27: OR Thailand Grand Prix
  - MotoGP winner: (Italy) Francesco Bagnaia (Ducati)
  - Moto 2 winner: (United States) Arón Canet (Kalex)
  - Moto 3 winner: (Colombia) David Alonso (CFMoto)
- November 3: Petronas Grand Prix of Malaysia
- November 17: (Valencian Community) Gran Premio Motul de la Comunitat Valenciana

=== 2024 TCR World Tour ===
- April 19–21: Round #1 at (Italy) Vallelunga
  - Race 1: (Hungary) Norbert Michelisz (BRC Hyundai N Squadra Corse)
  - Race 2: (Argentina) Néstor Girolami (BRC Hyundai N Squadra Corse)
- May 3–4: Round #2 at (Morocco) Circuit International Automobile Moulay El Hassan
  - Race 1: (France) Yann Ehrlacher (Lynk & Co Cyan Racing)
  - Race 2: (China) Ma Qing Hua (Lynk & Co Cyan Racing)
- June 7–9: Round #3 at (United States) Mid-Ohio Sports Car Course
  - Race 1: (Sweden) Thed Björk (Lynk & Co Cyan Racing)
  - Race 2: (France) Yann Ehrlacher (Lynk & Co Cyan Racing)
- July 19–21: Round #4 at (Brazil) Interlagos Circuit
  - Race 1: (Argentina) Esteban Guerrieri (GOAT Racing)
  - Race 2: (Hungary) Norbert Michelisz (BRC Hyundai N Squadra Corse)
- August 2–4: Round #5 at (Uruguay) Autódromo Víctor Borrat Fabini
  - Race 1: (France) Yann Ehrlacher (Lynk & Co Cyan Racing)
  - Race 2: (Sweden) Thed Björk (Lynk & Co Cyan Racing)
- September 20–22: Round #6 at (China) Zhuzhou International Circuit
  - Race 1: (Spain) Mikel Azcona (BRC Hyundai N Squadra Corse)
  - Race 2: (China) Ma Qing Hua (Lynk & Co Cyan Racing)
- November 1–2: Round #7 at (Australia) Sydney Motorsport Park
- November 7–9: Round #8 at (Australia) Mount Panorama Circuit
- November 14–17: Round #9 at (Macau) Guia Circuit

=== 2024 World Rally Championship ===
- January 25 – 28: (Monaco) Monte Carlo Rally
  - Overall winner: (Belgium) Thierry Neuville & (Belgium) Martijn Wydaeghe ( (South Korea) Hyundai Shell Mobis WRT)
  - WRC-2 winners: (France) Yohan Rossel & (France) Arnaud Dunand ( (Belgium) DG Sport Compétition)
  - WRC-3 winners: (Czech Republic) Jan Černý & (Czech Republic) Ondřej Krajča
- February 15 – 18: Rally Sweden
  - Overall winner: (Finland) Esapekka Lappi & (Finland) Janne Ferm ( (South Korea) Hyundai Shell Mobis WRT)
  - WRC-2 winners: (Sweden) Oliver Solberg & (United Kingdom) Elliott Edmondson ( (Germany) Toksport WRT)
  - WRC-3 winners: (Sweden) Mille Johansson & (Sweden) Johan Grönvall
- March 28 – 31: Safari Rally Kenya
  - Overall winner: (Finland) Kalle Rovanperä & (Finland) Jonne Halttunen ( (Japan) Toyota Gazoo Racing WRT)
  - WRC-2 winners: (Sweden) Gus Greensmith & (Sweden) Jonas Andersson ( (Germany) Toksport WRT)
  - WRC-3 winners: (Kenya) Hamza Anwar & (Kenya) Adnan Din
- April 18 – 21: Croatia Rally
  - Overall winner: (France) Sébastien Ogier & (France) Vincent Landais ( (Japan) Toyota Gazoo Racing WRT)
  - WRC-2 winners: (Bulgaria) Nikolay Gryazin & (Authorised Neutral Athletes) Konstantin Aleksandrov ( (Belgium) DG Sport Compétition)
  - WRC-3 winners: (Estonia) Romet Jürgenson & (Estonia) Siim Oja ( (Authorised Neutral Athletes) FIA Rally Star)
- May 9 – 12: Rally de Portugal
  - Overall winner: (France) Sébastien Ogier & (France) Vincent Landais ( (Japan) Toyota Gazoo Racing WRT)
  - WRC-2 winners: (Spain) Jan Solans & (Spain) Rodrigo Sanjuan de Eusebio
  - WRC-3 winners: (Paraguay) Diego Dominguez Jr. & (Spain) Rogelio Peñate
- May 30 – June 2: (Italy) Rally Italia Sardegna
  - Overall winner: (Estonia) Ott Tänak & (Estonia) Martin Järveoja ( (South Korea) Hyundai Shell Mobis WRT)
  - WRC-2 winners: (Finland) Sami Pajari & (Finland) Enni Mälkönen ( (Finland) Printsport)
  - WRC-3 winners: (Paraguay) Diego Dominguez Jr. & (Spain) Rogelio Peñate
- June 27 – 30: Rally Poland
  - Overall winner: (Finland) Kalle Rovanperä & (Finland) Jonne Halttunen ( (Japan) Toyota Gazoo Racing WRT)
  - WRC-2 winners: (Finland) Sami Pajari & (Finland) Enni Mälkönen ( (Finland) Printsport)
  - WRC-3 winners: (Paraguay) Diego Dominguez Jr. & (Spain) Rogelio Peñate
- July 18 – 21: Rally Latvia
  - Overall winner: (Finland) Kalle Rovanperä & (Finland) Jonne Halttunen ( (Japan) Toyota Gazoo Racing WRT)
  - WRC-2 winners: (Sweden) Oliver Solberg & (United Kingdom) Elliott Edmondson ( (Germany) Toksport WRT)
  - WRC-3 winners: (Estonia) Joosep Ralf Nõgene & (Estonia) Aleks Lesk
- August 1 – 4: Rally Finland
  - Overall winner: (France) Sébastien Ogier & (France) Vincent Landais ( (Japan) Toyota Gazoo Racing WRT)
  - WRC-2 winners: (Sweden) Oliver Solberg & (United Kingdom) Elliott Edmondson ( (Germany) Toksport WRT)
  - WRC-3 winners: (Finland) Jesse Kallio & (Finland) Ville Pynnönen
- September 5 – 8: Rally Greece
  - Overall winner: (Belgium) Thierry Neuville & (Belgium) Martijn Wydaeghe ( (South Korea) Hyundai Shell Mobis WRT)
  - WRC-2 winners: (Finland) Sami Pajari & (Finland) Enni Mälkönen ( (Finland) Printsport)
  - WRC-3 winners: (Romania) Norbert Maior & (Romania) Francesca Maria Maior
- September 26 – 29: Rally Chile
  - Overall winner: (Finland) Kalle Rovanperä & (Finland) Jonne Halttunen ( (Japan) Toyota Gazoo Racing WRT)
  - WRC-2 winners: (France) Yohan Rossel & (France) Florian Barral ( (Belgium) DG Sport Compétition)
  - WRC-3 winners: (Paraguay) Diego Dominguez Jr. & (Spain) Rogelio Peñate
- October 31 – November 3: (Europe) Central European Rally
  - Overall winner: (Estonia) Ott Tänak & (Estonia) Martin Järveoja ( (South Korea) Hyundai Shell Mobis WRT)
  - WRC-2 winners: (Bulgaria) Nikolay Gryazin & (Authorised Neutral Athletes) Konstantin Aleksandrov ( (Belgium) DG Sport Compétition)
  - WRC-3 winners: (France) Mattéo Chatillon & (France) Maxence Cornuau
- November 21 – 24: Rally Japan
  - Overall winner: (United Kingdom) Elfyn Evans & (United Kingdom) Scott Martin ( (Japan) Toyota Gazoo Racing WRT)
  - WRC-2 winners: (Bulgaria) Nikolay Gryazin & (Authorised Neutral Athletes) Konstantin Aleksandrov ( (Belgium) DG Sport Compétition)
  - WRC-3 winners: (Paraguay) Diego Dominguez Jr. & (Spain) Rogelio Peñate

=== 2024 World Rally-Raid Championship ===
- January 6 – 19: 2024 Dakar Rally in Saudi Arabia
  - Bikes winner: (United States) Ricky Brabec (Monster Energy Honda Team)
  - Quads winner: (Argentina) Manuel Andújar (7240 Team)
  - Cars winner: (Spain) Carlos Sainz (Team Audi Sport)
  - Challenger winner: (Spain) Cristina Gutiérrez (Red Bull Off-Road JR Team USA By BFG)
  - SSV winner: (France) Xavier de Soultrait (Sébastien Loeb Racing - Bardahl Team)
  - Trucks winner: (Czech Republic) Martin Macík (MM Technology)
  - Classics winner: (Spain) Carlos Santaolalla (Factorytub)
- February 25 – March 2: Abu Dhabi Desert Challenge in United Arab Emirates
  - Bikes winner: (South Africa) Aaron Maré (Motosports Team Rally)
  - Cars winner: (Qatar) Nasser Al-Attiyah (Nasser Racing)
  - Challenger winner: (United States) Austin Jones (Can-Am Factory Team)
  - SSV winner: (United Arab Emirates) Mansour Al-Helei (RX-Sport)
- April 2–7: BP Ultimate Rally-Raid Portugal in Portugal
  - Bikes winner: (Spain) Tosha Schareina (Monster Energy Honda Team)
  - Cars winner: (Qatar) Nasser Al-Attiyah (Nasser Racing)
- June 2–8: Desafío Ruta 40 in Argentina
- October 5–11: Rallye du Maroc in Morocco

=== NASCAR ===
- February 4 – November 10: 2024 NASCAR Cup Series
- February 16 – November 8: 2024 NASCAR Craftsman Truck Series
- February 17 – November 9: 2024 NASCAR Xfinity Series

=== IndyCar Series ===
- March 3 – September 8: 2024 IndyCar Series

=== Hillclimbing ===
==== 2024 FIA European Hill Climb Championship ====
- May 28: Rechberg in Austria
- May 12: Subida al Fito in Spain
- May 19: Rampa da Falperra in Portugal
- June 2: Ecce Homo Sternberk in Czech Republic
- June 16: ADAC Glasbachrennen in Germany
- July 14: Trofeo Vallecamonica in Italy
- July 28: Limanowa in Poland
- August 18: St Ursanne - Les Rangiers in Switzerland
- September 1: 30. GHD Ilirska Bistrica in Slovenia
- September 15: Buzetski dani in Croatia
- October 20: Achladokampos Hill Climb 2024 in Greece
  - Event cancelled

== See also ==
- List of 2024 motorsport champions
