= W Racing Team =

Belgian auto racing team

(Belgium) W Racing Team
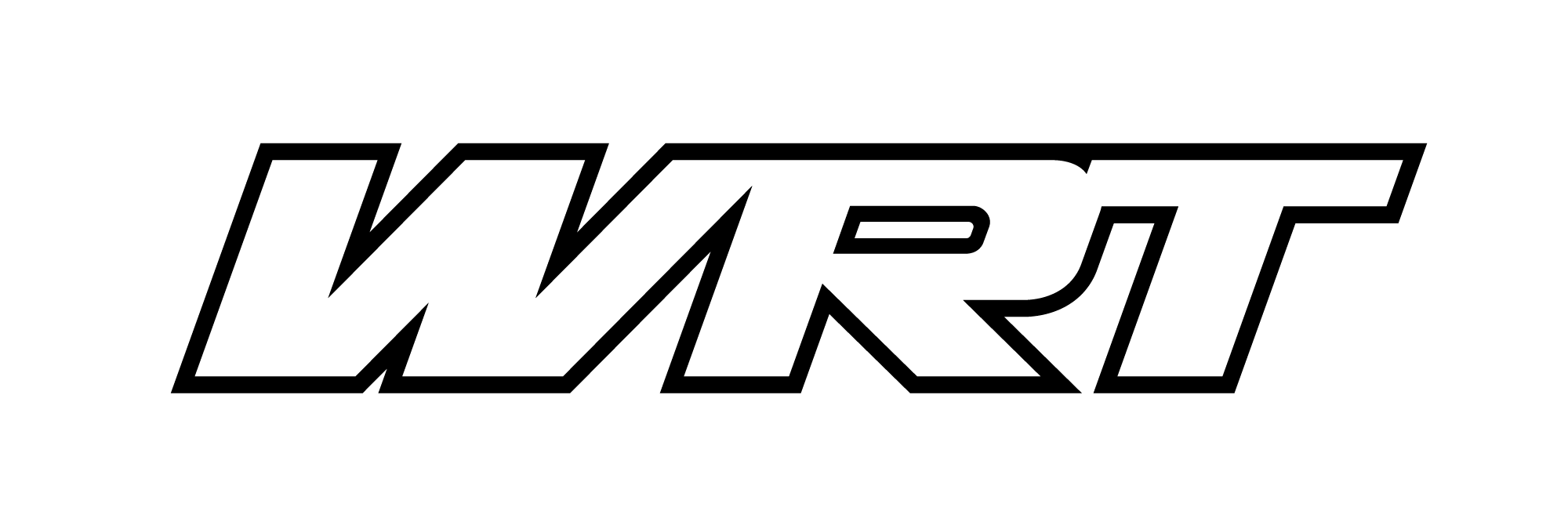
- Founded: 2009
- Base: Grâce-Hollogne, Belgium
- Team principal(s): Vincent Vosse; René Verbist; Yves Weerts
- Current series: FIA World Endurance Championship; IMSA SportsCar Championship; GT World Challenge Europe; Intercontinental GT Challenge
- Former series: European Le Mans Series; ADAC GT Masters; Deutsche Tourenwagen Masters; Blancpain GT Series; FIA WTCR; TCR; Belgian Touring Car Series; Andros Trophy; FIA GT3 European Championship; Belcar
- Teams' Championships: 41 (last 2026 GT World Challenge Europe Overall)
- Drivers' Championships: 35 (last 2026 GT World Challenge Europe Overall - Silver Cup)

W Racing Team (known as Team WRT) is a Belgian auto racing team founded in 2009 by engineer and former head of Volkswagen Motorsport René Verbist, racing driver Vincent Vosse, and entrepreneur Yves Weerts. Between 2010 and 2022 the team campaigned Audi R8 LMSs in several international sports car series. In 2010, the team won the Belcar Drivers' and Teams' Championships, while in 2011 they won the Spa 24 Hours. After winning multiple titles in various GT championships, WRT is considered to be one of the best teams worldwide in GT racing. In 2019 and 2020, WRT ran two Audi RS5 Turbo DTMs in the highly competitive DTM championship. In 2021, WRT added a full time LMP2 program, by entering an Oreca 07 in both the FIA World Endurance Championship and European Le Mans Series, and won the LMP2 class of the 2021 24 Hours of Le Mans. From 2023 on WRT, switched their partnership in GT racing from Audi to BMW and run the BMW M4 GT3. The team will also run two factory backed BMW M Hybrid V8s in the FIA World Endurance Championship Hypercar category from 2024 and in the IMSA SportsCar Championship GTP class from 2026.

== Racing history ==
=== 2010–11: Beginning and early success ===
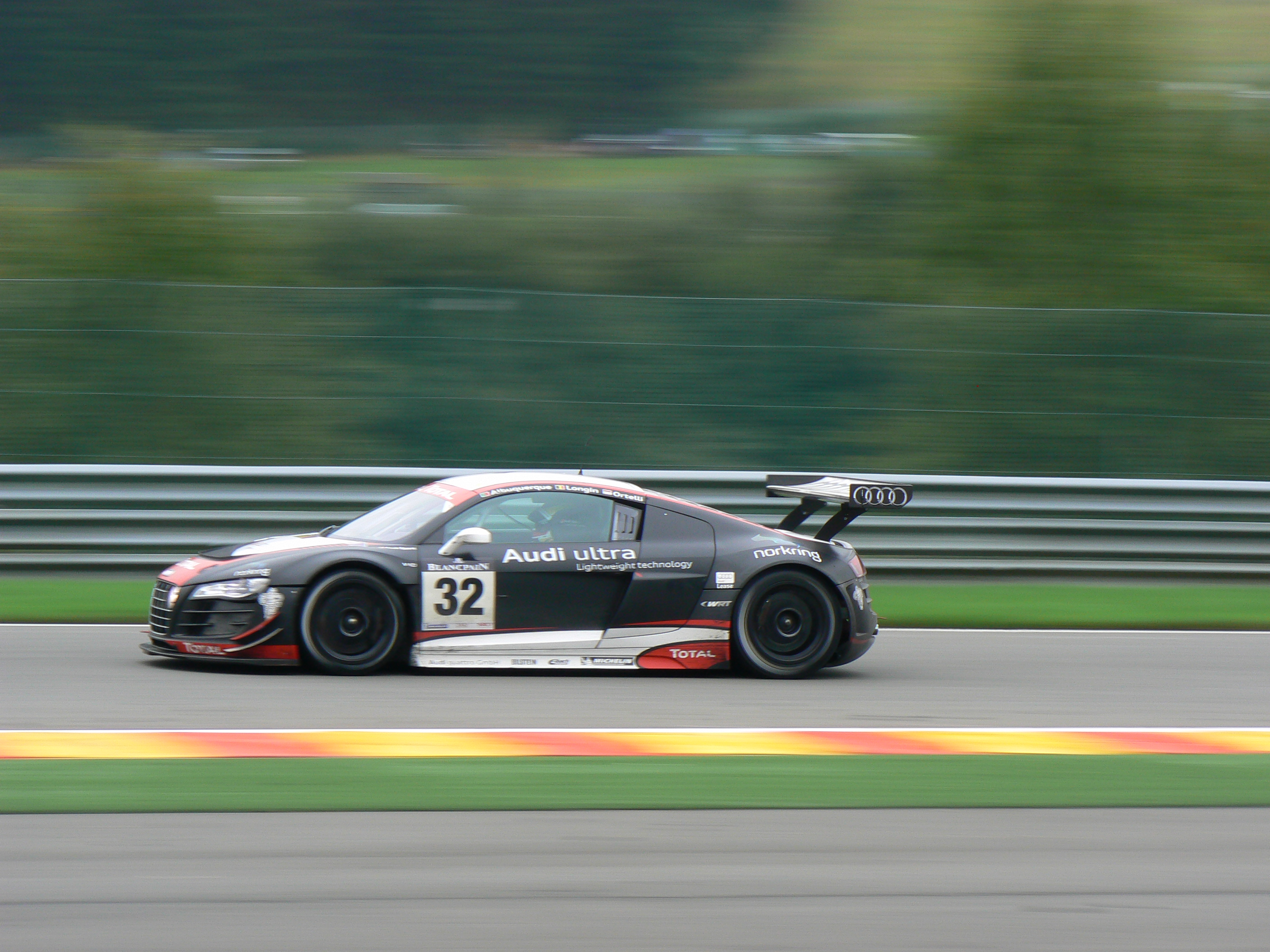
Audi R8 LMS during Blancpain Endurance Series season

Upon the team's founding in late 2009, WRT purchased three Audi R8 LMS race cars as part of being the official Belgian Audi motorsport importer. The trio of cars shared duties in 2010 between the national Belcar Endurance Championship, the French FFSA GT Championship (now GT Tour), and the mid-season Spa 24 Hours. The team had success from the start, finishing on the podium with at least one car in every Belcar race including two wins by Gregory Franchi and Anthony Kumpen and a third victory in a ten-hour endurance race at Circuit Zolder with François Verbist, Bert Longin, and Bill Bailly. Franchi and Kumpen locked up the Drivers' Championship, while WRT secured the Teams' Championship. Franchi also partnered with Stéphane Lémeret to earn two further podium finishes in FFSA GT. In addition to this program, two Volkswagen Scirocco GT24s were purchased for use in the Belgian Touring Car Series where the team were vice-champions in their category.

Following their first year's success, WRT expanded their program for 2011 by adding the FIA GT3 European Championship and Blancpain Endurance Series to the schedule for their Audis. Once again success came early as WRT won the second of two races in the first event of the FIA GT3 Championship with Franchi partnering Enzo Ide. Their GT Tour program under the title of Team Audi France with French drivers David Hallyday and Stéphane Ortelli also earned its first victory for the team at Dijon-Prenois. In July WRT won the Spa 24 Hours in only their second attempt, with Franchi sharing the drive with factory Audi drivers Timo Scheider and Mattias Ekström.

=== 2012–18: Further expansion with Audi ===
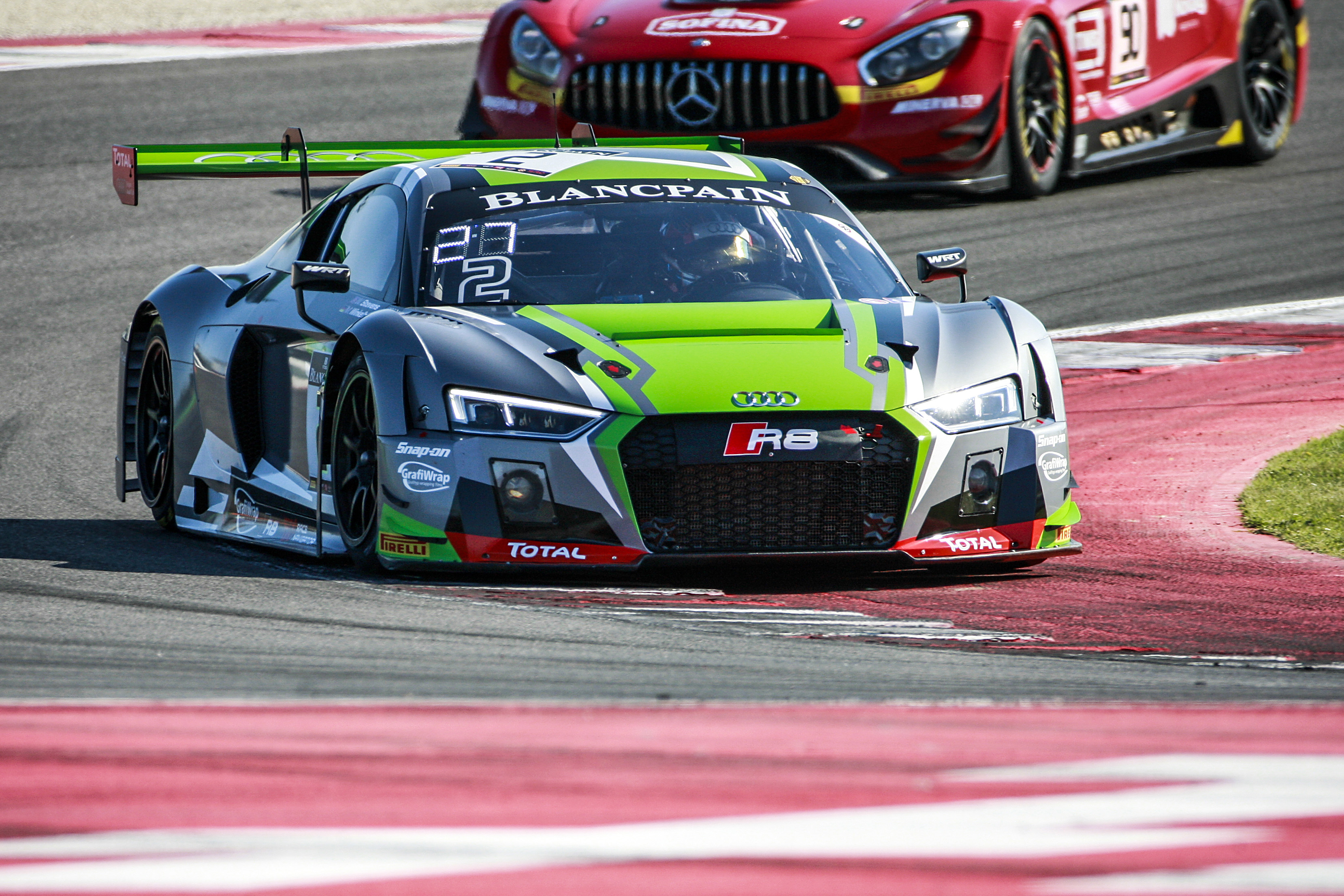
An Audi R8 LMS from W Racing Team

WRT announced further expansion of their program in 2012 with accepted entries in the FIA GT World Championship as the representatives of Audi. They went on to finish third in the Teams standings, winning three races on the way. In 2013 WRT won both the Teams' and Drivers' Championship of the newly named FIA GT Series.

In 2014 WRT competed both in the Blancpain Endurance Series and Blancpain Sprint Series, successor of the FIA GT Series. They won both the Teams' and Drivers' Championship in the Blancpain GT Series as well as in the Blancpain Endurance Series. They also won the Teams' Championship in the Blancpain Sprint Series. In July 2014 they added a second win in the Spa 24 Hours with Laurens Vanthoor, René Rast and Markus Winkelhock at the wheel of an Audi R8 LMS. In 2015 they again won both Teams' and Drivers' championships in the Blancpain GT Series. They were also crowned Teams' Champions in the Sprint and Endurance Series. In May 2015 WRT achieved another major success by winning the 24 Hours of Nürburgring with the new version of the Audi R8 LMS (GT3).

In 2016, WRT made their debut in Touring car racing, running pair of Volkswagen Golfs in the TCR International Series under the Leopard Racing badge. Driving for the team were Stefano Comini and Jean-Karl Vernay. WRT also made their debut in the European Le Mans Series running a Ligier JS P2, but only at the 4 Hours of Spa. They won the TCR International Series Drivers' titles in both 2016 and 2017, with Comini and Vernay respectively. In 2018 and 2019 WRT participated in the World Touring Car Cup fielding a pair of Audi RS3 LMSs.

=== 2019–20: Deutsche Tourenwagen Masters ===
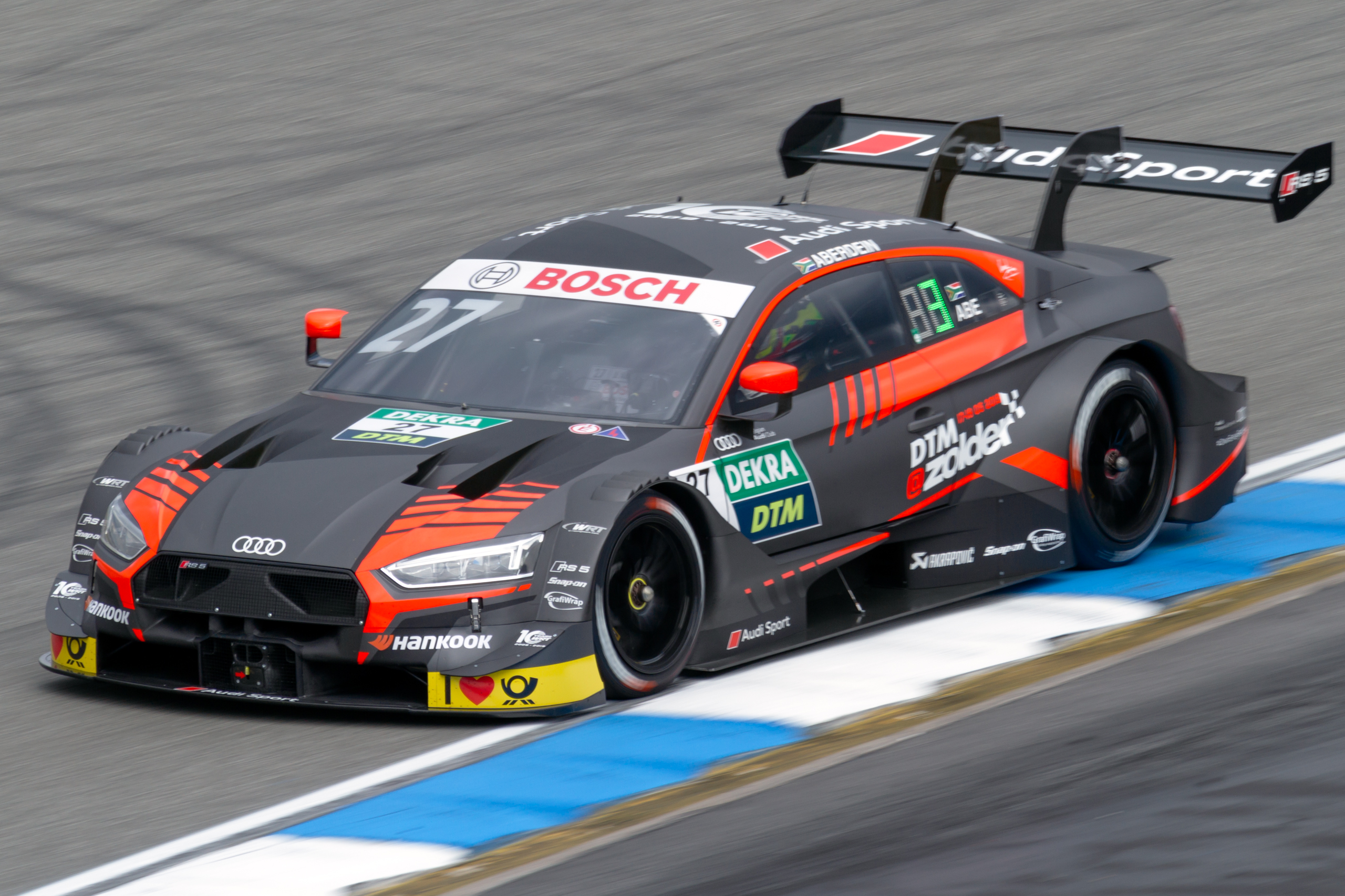
Audi RS5 DTM Turbo at Hockenheim, driven by Jonathan Aberdein

In 2018 WRT won the Bathurst 12 hour race with the Audi R8 LMS (GT3), at their first attempt. On 12 October 2018 WRT announced it would run a pair of Audi RS5 Turbo DTMs in the 2019 DTM season as a customer team. They later announced Jonathan Aberdein and Pietro Fittipaldi, grandson of double Formula One World Champion Emerson Fittipaldi, as their two drivers for the season. Although not scoring a single podium, Aberdein was able to impress with several points scoring positions and finished the season in tenth place as the highest ranked rookie. In August 2019 WRT won the 2019 Suzuka 10 Hours, which was the 48th edition of the Summer Endurance Classic at Suzuka.

At the end of 2019, WRT announced an all new line-up for the 2020 DTM season consisting of 2016 Indy Lights champion Ed Jones and FIA Formula 3 driver Fabio Scherer. Later WRT announced they would enter a third car for Ferdinand Habsburg, who had previously been driving for Aston Martin. Before the season started Jones pulled out of the championship due to travel complications as a result of the COVID-19 pandemic. He was subsequently replaced by Harrison Newey, who made his debut in the DTM. Habsburg managed to score his and the team's first podium finish as well as a pole position. As a result of Audi's exit at the end of the season it was decided that the Class One formula would be dropped and replaced by GT3 machinery. WRT ultimately decided not to enter the DTM in 2021.

=== 2021–23: LMP2 Program ===
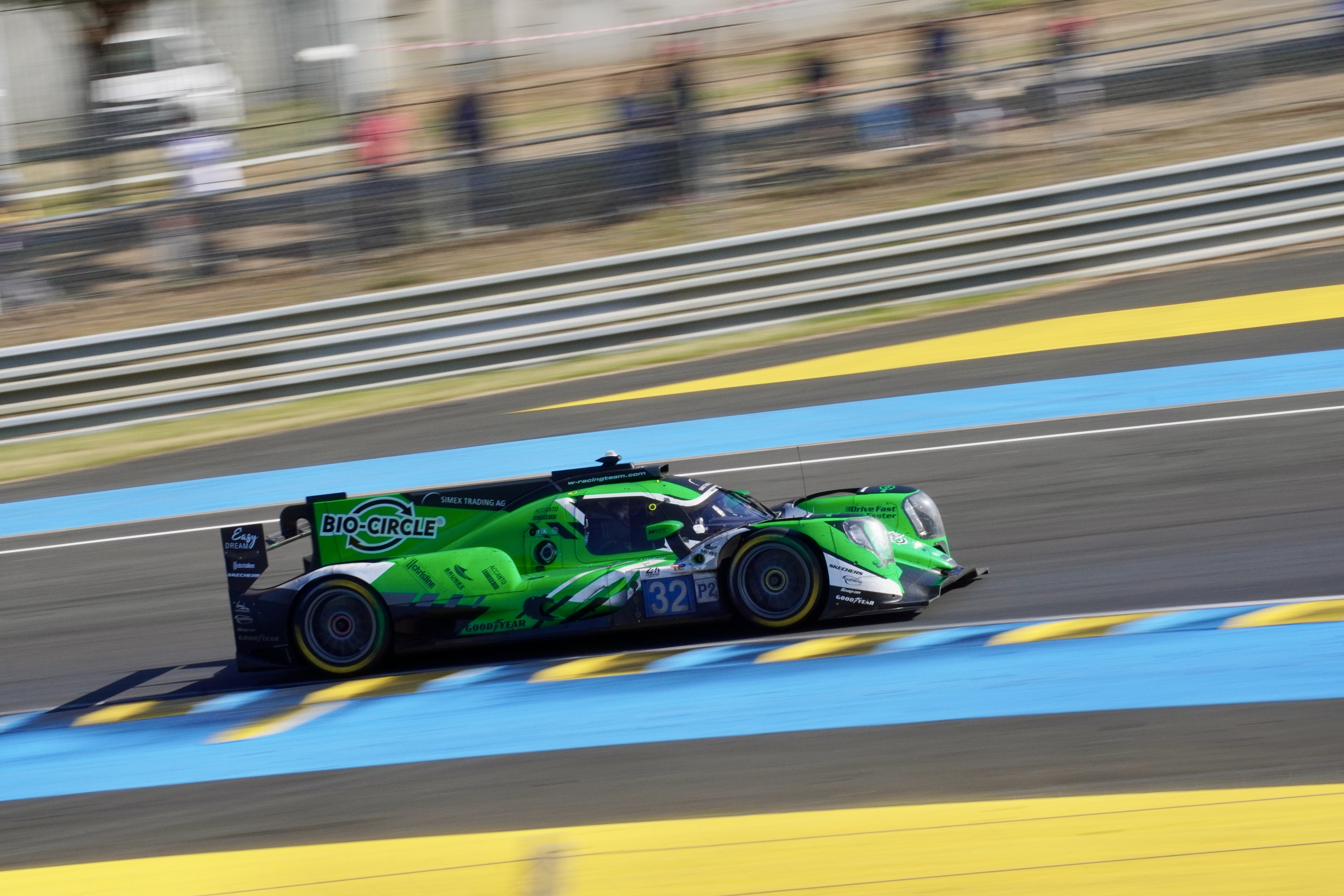
The #32 Oreca 07 entered by Team WRT at the 2022 24 Hours of Le Mans

After exiting the DTM, WRT announced their intention to enter the LMP2 class in the FIA WEC to prepare for an eventual program in the new LMDh formula. On 21 January the team officially announced it would enter the FIA WEC with an Oreca 07. The drivers will be Robin Frijns, Ferdinand Habsburg and Charles Milesi. WRT later announced that they would also enter an Oreca 07 in the ELMS driven by Robert Kubica. He will be joined by Louis Delétraz and Yifei Ye. The team once again was successful from the offset and won the first two races of the ELMS championship.

Team WRT decided to enter both cars at the 2021 24 Hours of Le Mans. After taking the lead during the first half of the race WRT was on course to score a sensational 1-2 finish on its Le Mans debut. However, at the start of the last lap car #41 driven by Yifei Ye came to a stop due to a technical fault and was unable to make the finish, giving the win to the sister car #31 who crossed the finish line just over 7/10ths in front of the chasing Oreca 07 from Tom Blomqvist.

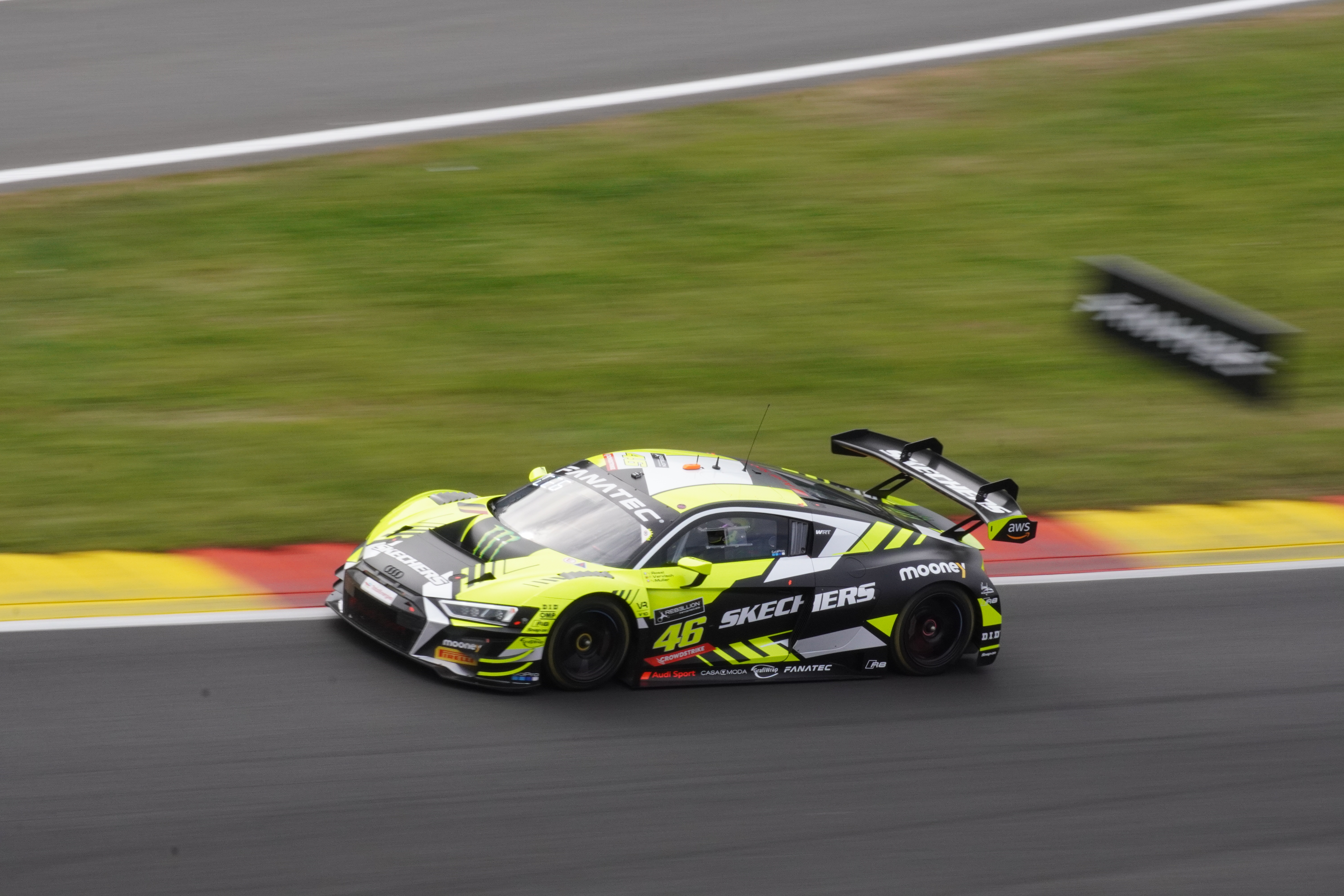
The #46 Audi R8 LMS Evo II driven by Rossi, Vervisch and Müller

Adding to their Le Mans victory, Team WRT ended the 2021 season winning both the Drivers' and Teams' titles in the FIA WEC and ELMS. This means the team won all possible titles in their debut LMP2 season. Additionally WRT won five out of six possible titles in the GT World Challenge series with their GT operation, rounding off their most successful season to date. In 2022 WRT will expand to two full season entries in the FIA WEC. WRT also continues to run several Audi R8 LMS in the GT World Challenge Europe and will field a car for MotoGP legend Valentino Rossi in 2022. He will team up with Audi Sport factory drivers Frédéric Vervisch and Nico Müller. In January 2022 WRT won the Dubai 24 Hour for a second time. In the GT World Challenge Europe, the team won the Sprint Cup Teams' title for the ninth time in ten years while WRT drivers Dries Vanthoor and Charles Weerts won the Drivers' title for the third time in a row. This marked the end of an incredibly successful partnership with Audi Sport across SRO championships where the team earned several wins and won multiple titles. From 2023 WRT will field several BMW M4 GT3s. In the FIA WEC, WRT was unable to retain its LMP2 titles despite winning four out of six races due to a bad result at the 24 Hours of Le Mans where points count double.

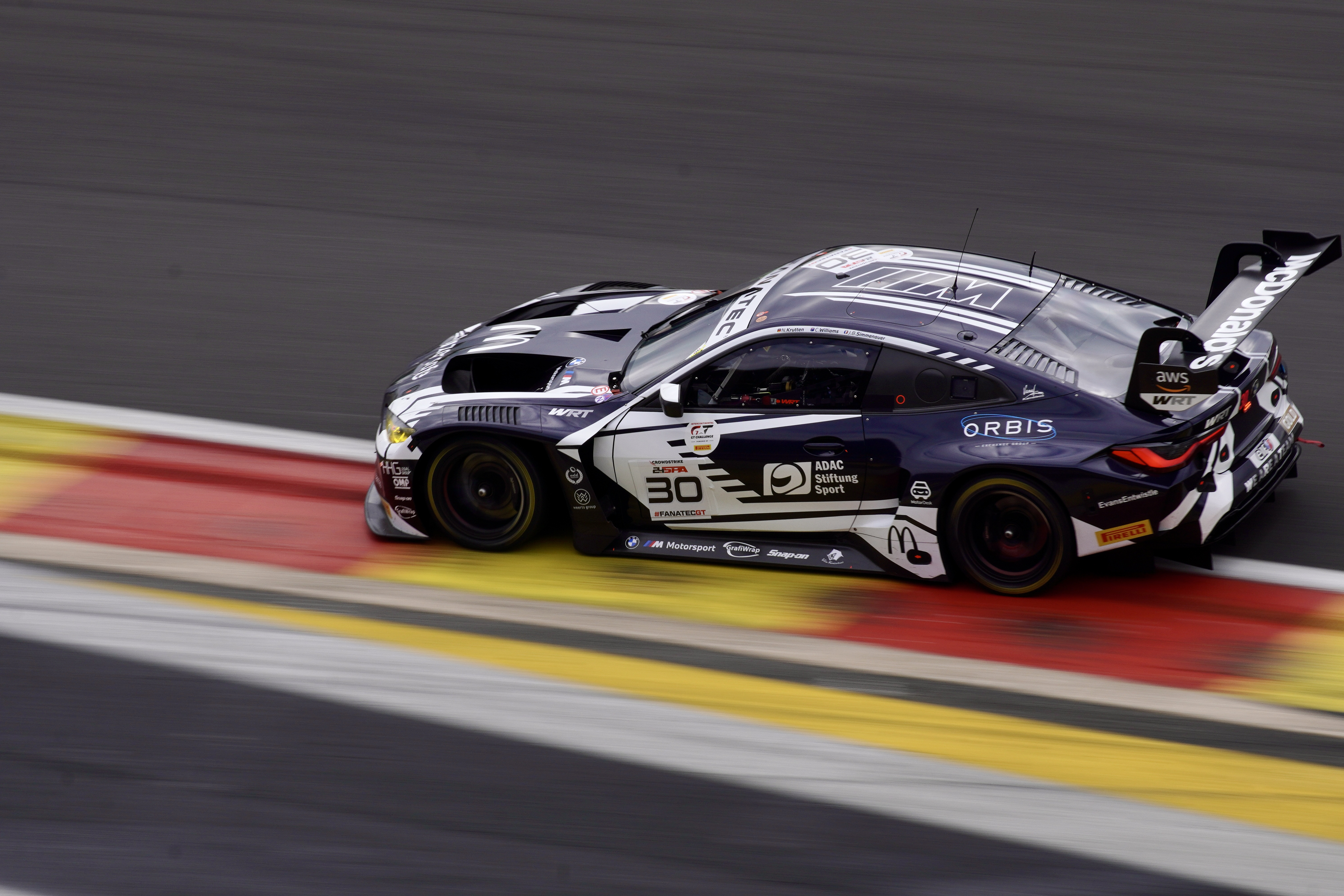
A BMW M4 GT3 from WRT during the 2023 24 Hours of Spa

On 15 January 2023 WRT won the Dubai 24 Hour for the third time after having previously won the 2016 and 2022 editions. This marked WRT's first outing with BMW and immediately resulted in the BMW M4 GT3's first major 24 hour race victory. In February WRT also contested the first two rounds of the 2023 Intercontinental GT Challenge at Bathurst and Kyalami. WRT scored a 1–2 win at the Kyalami 9 Hours. In the FIA World Endurance Championship WRT once again entered two Oreca 07s in the LMP2 class. At the 2023 24 Hours of Le Mans WRT's #41 car finished second only 20s behind the winner, which was enough to give the #41 car driven by Robert Kubica, Louis Delétraz and Rui Andrade the lead in the championship. The trio went on to claim the 2023 FIA WEC LMP2 championship rounding of the season with three wins and six podiums in seven races. WRT ended the LMP2 era in WEC with 10 race victories in 19 races and 2 championship wins in 3 seasons.

=== 2024–present: Hypercar with BMW ===
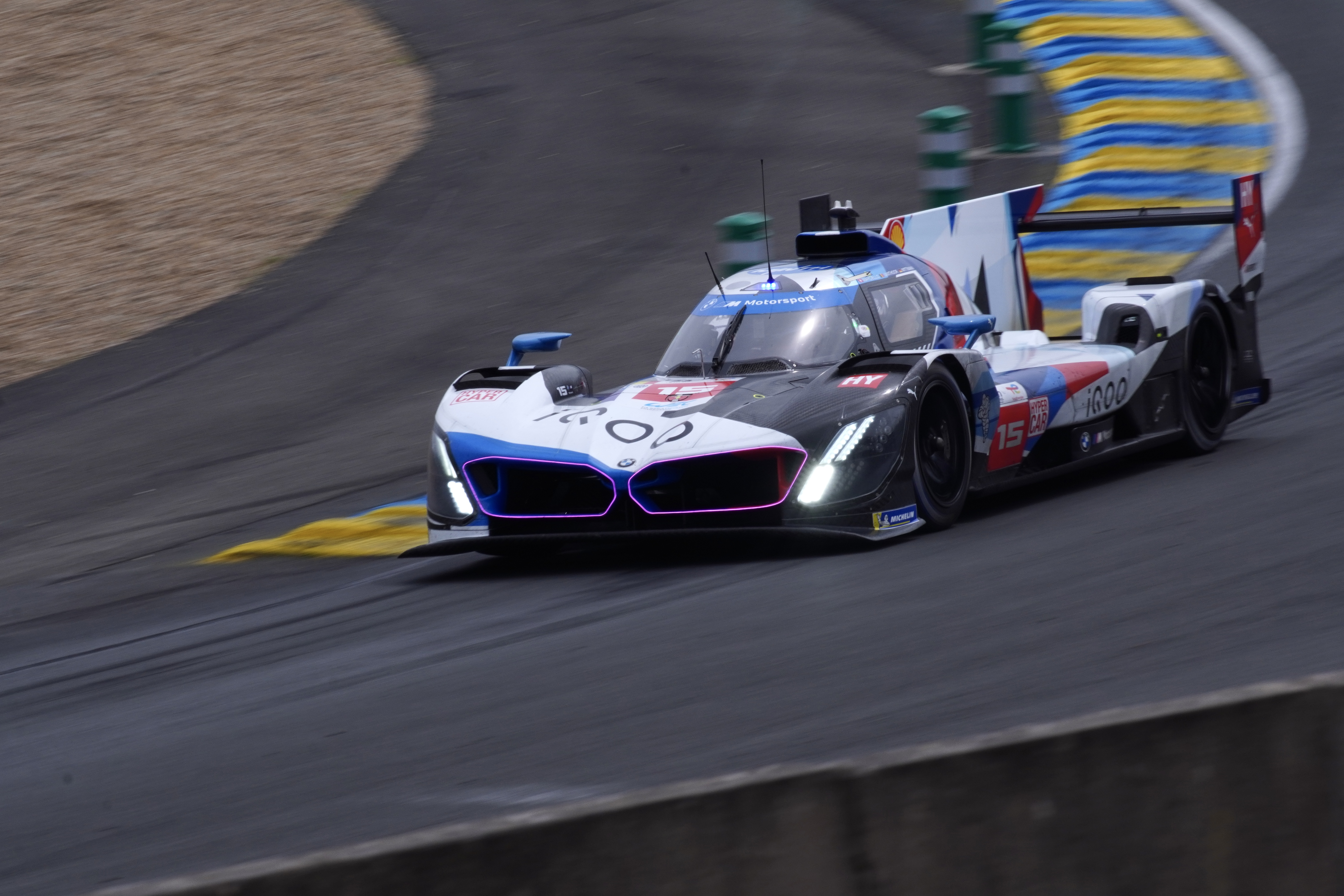
BMW M Hybrid V8 #15 during practice at the 2024 24 Hours of Le Mans

While never officially announced WRT had been chosen by Audi to run their LMDh program in the 2023 FIA WEC Hypercar class. However, days before the first rollout of the car Audi decided to stop the program, officially stating it was putting it on hold. As a result, WRT started looking to other options to enter the class in the WEC series. On 2 August 2022 WRT announced it would terminate their 13 years long partnership in GT racing with Audi Sport. Hours later BMW Motorsport announced that Team WRT would run their factory LMDh program in the FIA WEC. WRT will start extensive testing of the BMW M Hybrid V8 in 2023 before entering the 2024 FIA World Endurance Championship. In addition to the Hypercar program WRT will also switch to BMW machinery for their GT3 efforts. The team confirmed that they would enter several BMW M4 GT3's starting from 2023. On November 27, 2023, the 2024 FIA WEC entry list was revealed confirming that WRT would enter a total of four cars. Two BMW M Hybrid V8's in the Hypercar class that will compete for the overall wins as well as two BMW M4 GT3's competing in the newly formed LMGT3 class. For their first season in Hypercar the #15 BMW will be driven by long time WRT driver Dries Vanthoor, two times DTM champion Marco Wittmann and Raffaele Marciello coming over from Mercedes. The #20 car will be shared by Sheldon van der Linde, Robin Frijns and René Rast. In the LMGT3 the #31 will be driven by Indonesian driver Sean Gelael switching from LMP2, Augusto Farfus and Darren Leung. On the #46 car Valentino Rossi will be lining up with his regular teammate Maxime Martin and Omani driver Ahmad Al Harthy.

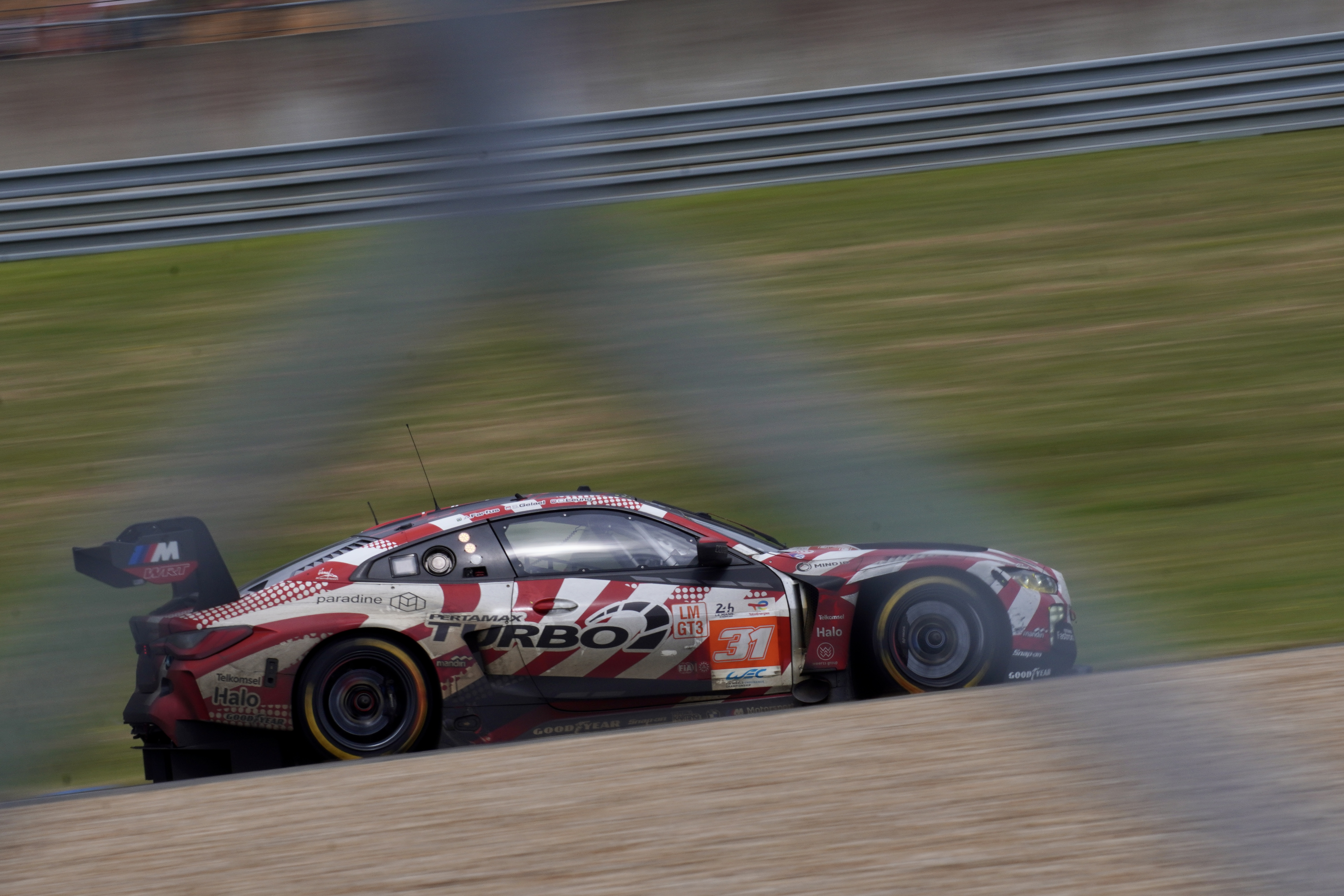
The #31 BMW M4 GT3 at the 2024 24 Hours of Le Mans

After a difficult start in Hypercar the team started to show improvements from the 24 Hours of Le Mans on, where Dries Vanthoor put the BMW M Hybrid V8 first during the qualifying session. However, both cars suffered crashes during the race early on preventing any good result. At the 6 Hours of Fuji the #15 car achieved its best overall qualifying result in third and improved to second in the race. This was BMW's first overall podium in the World Endurance Championship. WRT eventually secured fifth place in the manufacturers standings for BMW in their maiden season in Hypercar. In the LMGT3 WRT enjoyed much more success. After a strong debut in Qatar, WRT scored a 1–2 win at Imola thanks to a very good strategic decision to leave both cars on slick tires during the rain. This marked BMW's first win in any class in the WEC. At the 24 Hours of Le Mans both cars looked in the hunt for the win. However, the #46 car driven by Ahmad Al Harthy crashed out in the early night in tricky conditions. The #31 BMW M4 GT3 eventually ended up second, only a handful seconds behind the winning Porsche from Manthey Racing. Both cars ended the season in fourth and sixth position in the standings.

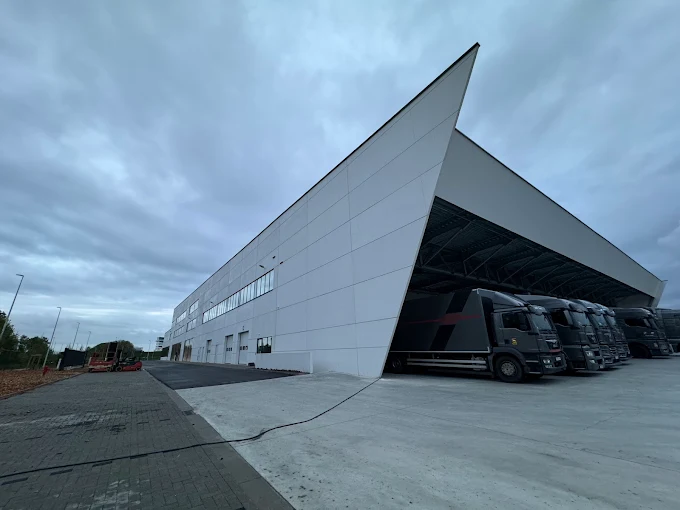
New WRT HQ at Bierset

For the 2025 Hypercar WEC season Team WRT's driver line-up remained largely unchanged. The only change was the addition of ex Formula 1 driver Kevin Magnussen, joining Dries Vanthoor and Raffaele Marciello in the #15 car, replacing Marco Wittmann. The car showed good pace in the opening rounds of the World Endurance Championship, with a second place finish at Imola less than 10 seconds behind the winning Ferrari. Both cars, however, suffered mechanical issues late on at the 2025 24 Hours of Le Mans preventing a good result. In the LMGT3 championship WRT scored a few podiums during the season but was unable to challenge for the titles. In May 2025 WRT also unveiled their brand new facilities at Bierset, close to the Liège Airport, bringing together their different activities under one building.

For 2026, the team's Hypercar program with BMW expanded, as Team WRT began fielding BMW's hypercars in the IMSA SportsCar Championship in America, taking over from BMW's previous IMSA partner Rahal Letterman Lanigan Racing.

== Results & Achievements ==
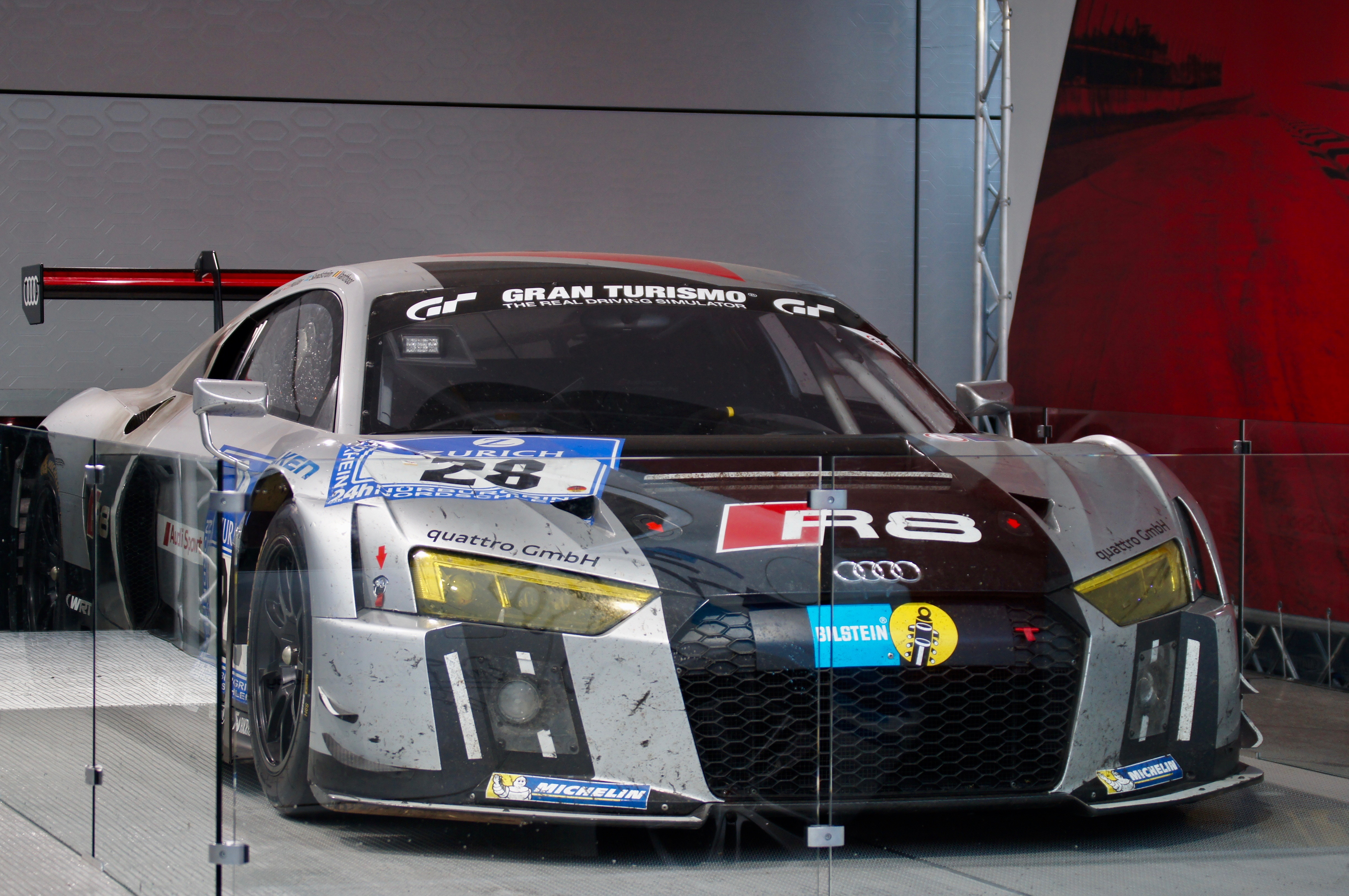
Audi R8 LMS, winner of the 2015 24 Hours of Nürburgring

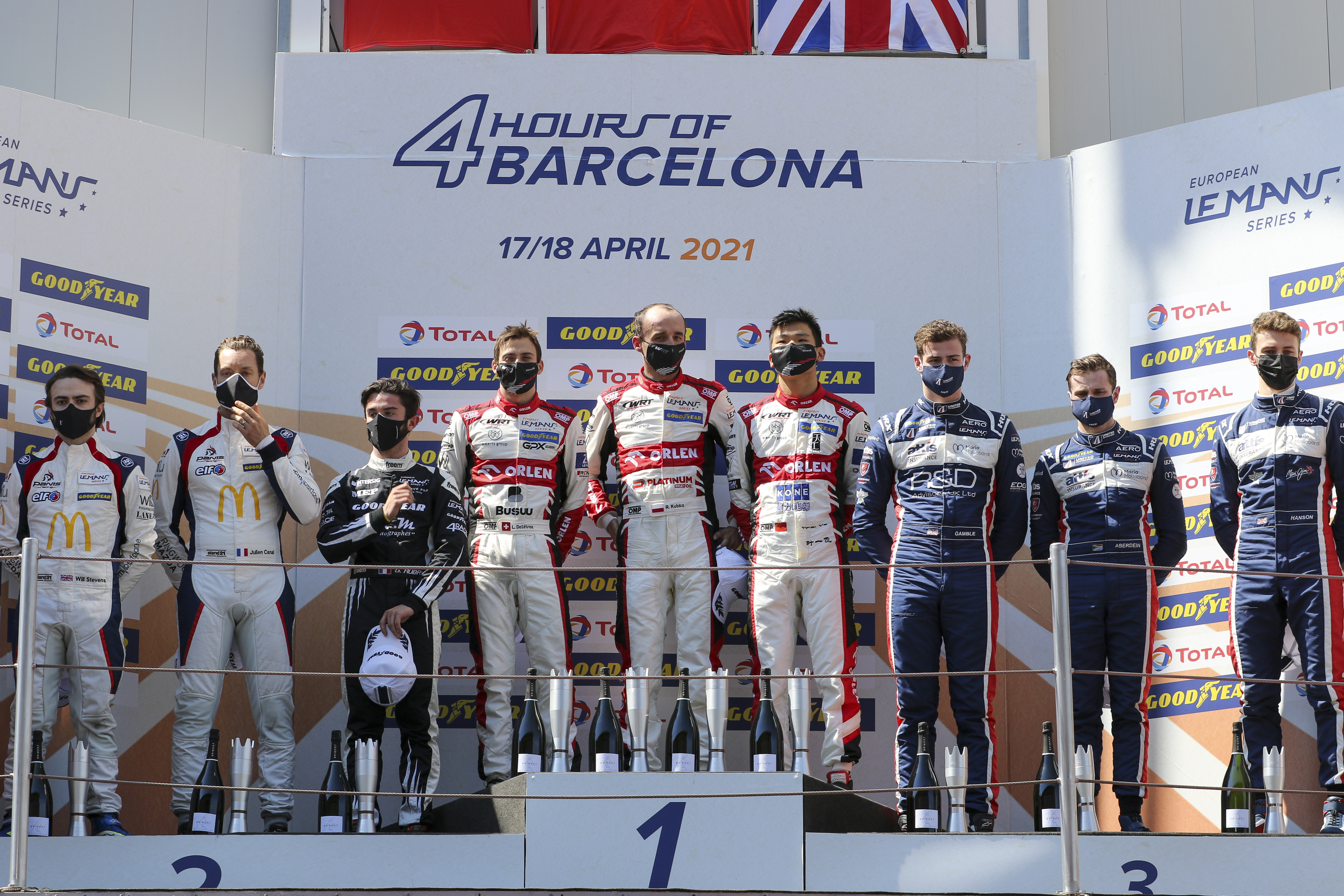
Podium at the 2021 4 Hours of Barcelona, where WRT took its first victory in the ELMS with drivers Robert Kubica, Louis Delétraz and Yifei Ye

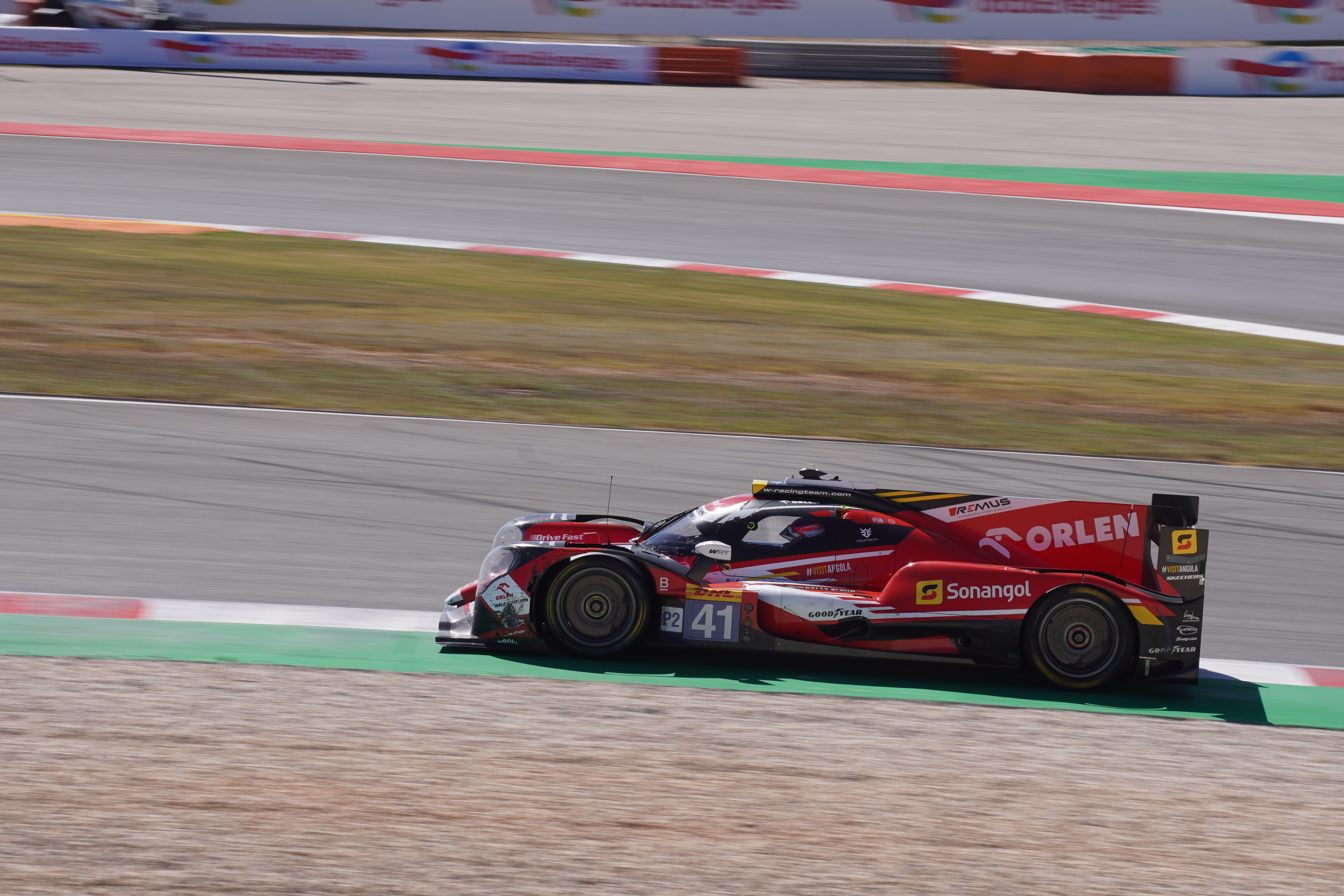
Oreca 07 #41 from Team WRT at the 2023 FIA WEC 6 Hours of Portimão driven by Louis Delétraz, Robert Kubica and Rui Andrade who claimed the 2023 LMP2 championship in the FIA WEC

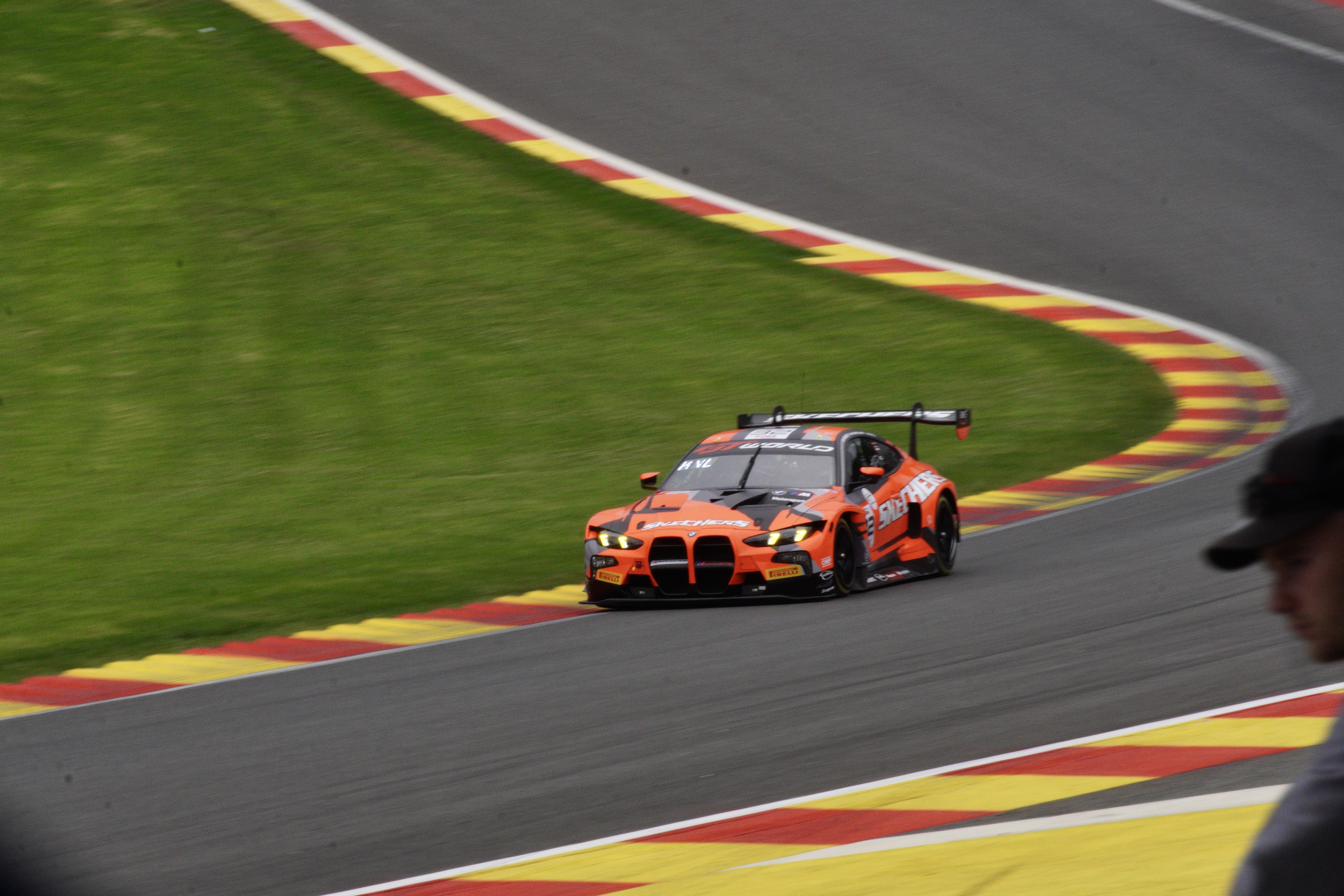
The #32 BMW M4 GT3 Evo that won the 2025 GT World Challenge Europe Overall drivers' and teams' titles

=== Notable Victories ===
- Overall Winner - 2011 24 Hours of Spa-Francorchamps
- Overall Winner - 2011 24 Hours of Zolder
- Overall Winner - 2012 24 Hours of Zolder
- Overall Winner - 2013 Baku World Challenge
- Overall Winner - 2014 24 Hours of Spa-Francorchamps
- Overall Winner - 2014 Baku World Challenge
- Overall Winner - 2015 24 Hours of Nürburgring
- Overall Winner - 2015 12 Hours of Sepang
- Overall Winner - 2016 24 Hours of Dubai
- Overall Winner - 2016 FIA GT World Cup
- Overall Winner - 2018 12 Hours of Bathurst
- Overall Winner - 2019 10 Hours of Suzuka
- LMP2 Winner - 2021 24 Hours of Le Mans
- Overall Winner - 2022 24 Hours of Dubai
- Overall Winner - 2023 24 Hours of Dubai
- Overall Winner - 2023 9 Hours of Kyalami
- Overall Winner - 2023 8 Hours of Indianapolis
- Overall Winner - 2024 8 Hours of Indianapolis
- Overall Winner - 2025 24 Hours of Dubai
- Overall Winner - 2025 Bathurst 12 Hour
- Overall Winner - 2025 Suzuka 1000 km
- Overall Winner - 2025 8 Hours of Indianapolis
- Overall Winner - 2026 24 Hours of Dubai
- Overall Winner - 2026 6 Hours of Spa-Francorchamps
- Overall Winner - 2026 6 Hours of São Paulo

=== Main Championship titles ===
- GT World Challenge Europe Endurance Cup
  - Overall Teams’ Champion in 2011, 2012, 2014, 2015 and 2021
  - Overall Drivers’ Champion in 2011, 2012 and 2014
- GT World Challenge Europe Sprint Cup
  - Overall Teams’ Champion in 2013, 2014, 2015, 2016, 2017, 2018, 2020, 2021, 2022, 2024, 2025 and 2026
  - Overall Drivers’ Champion in 2013, 2016, 2017, 2020, 2021, 2022 and 2025
- GT World Challenge Europe
  - Overall Teams’ Champion in 2014, 2015, 2020, 2021, 2024, 2025 and 2026
  - Overall Drivers’ Champion in 2014, 2015, 2021 and 2025
- Andros Trophy
  - Overall Teams’ Champion in 2015-16 and 2016-17
- European Le Mans Series
  - LMP2 Teams’ Champion in 2021
  - LMP2 Drivers’ Champion in 2021
- FIA World Endurance Championship
  - Endurance Trophy for LMP2 Teams in 2021 and 2023
  - Endurance Trophy for LMP2 Drivers in 2021 and 2023

=== 24 Hours of Le Mans ===
Year	Entrant	No.	Car	Drivers	Class	Laps	Pos.	Class Pos.
2021	(Belgium) Team WRT	31	Oreca 07-Gibson	(Netherlands) Robin Frijns (Austria) Ferdinand Habsburg (France) Charles Milesi	LMP2	363	6th	1st
2021	(Belgium) Team WRT	41	Oreca 07-Gibson	(Switzerland) Louis Delétraz (Poland) Robert Kubica (China) Yifei Ye	LMP2	362	NC	NC
2022	(Belgium) Team WRT	31	Oreca 07-Gibson	(Netherlands) Robin Frijns (Indonesia) Sean Gelael (Germany) Rene Rast	LMP2	285	DNF	DNF
2022	(Belgium) Team WRT	32	Oreca 07-Gibson	(Italy) Mirko Bortolotti (Switzerland) Rolf Ineichen (Belgium) Dries Vanthoor	LMP2	366	15th	11th
2022	(Switzerland) RealTeam by WRT	41	Oreca 07-Gibson	(Portugal) Rui Andrade (Austria) Ferdinand Habsburg (France) Norman Nato	LMP2	362	21st	17th
2023	(Belgium) Team WRT	31	Oreca 07-Gibson	(Netherlands) Robin Frijns (Indonesia) Sean Gelael (Austria) Ferdinand Habsburg	LMP2	327	13th	5th
2023	(Belgium) Team WRT	41	Oreca 07-Gibson	(Angola) Rui Andrade (Switzerland) Louis Delétraz (Poland) Robert Kubica	LMP2	328	10th	2nd
2024	(Belgium) BMW M Team WRT	15	BMW M Hybrid V8	(Switzerland) Raffaele Marciello (Belgium) Dries Vanthoor (Germany) Marco Wittmann	Hypercar	102	DNF	DNF
2024	(Belgium) BMW M Team WRT	20	BMW M Hybrid V8	(Netherlands) Robin Frijns (Germany) René Rast (South Africa) Sheldon van der Linde	Hypercar	96	NC	NC
2024	(Belgium) Team WRT	31	BMW M4 GT3	(Brazil) Augusto Farfus (Indonesia) Sean Gelael (United Kingdom) Darren Leung	LMGT3	280	28th	2nd
2024	(Belgium) Team WRT	46	BMW M4 GT3	(Oman) Ahmad Al Harthy (Belgium) Maxime Martin (Italy) Valentino Rossi	LMGT3	109	DNF	DNF
2025	(Germany) BMW M Team WRT	15	BMW M Hybrid V8	(Denmark) Kevin Magnussen (Switzerland) Raffaele Marciello (Belgium) Dries Vanthoor	Hypercar	361	31st	18th
2025	(Germany) BMW M Team WRT	20	BMW M Hybrid V8	(Netherlands) Robin Frijns (Germany) René Rast (South Africa) Sheldon van der Linde	Hypercar	375	17th	17th
2025	(Belgium) The Bend Team WRT	31	BMW M4 GT3 Evo	Timur Boguslavskiy (Brazil) Augusto Farfus (Australia) Yasser Shahin	LMGT3	168	DNF	DNF
2025	(Belgium) Team WRT	46	BMW M4 GT3 Evo	(Oman) Ahmad Al Harthy (Italy) Valentino Rossi (South Africa) Kelvin van der Linde	LMGT3	156	DNF	DNF
2026	(Germany) BMW M Team WRT	15	BMW M Hybrid V8	(Denmark) Kevin Magnussen (Switzerland) Raffaele Marciello (Belgium) Dries Vanthoor	Hypercar	272	DNF	DNF
2026	(Germany) BMW M Team WRT	20	BMW M Hybrid V8	(Netherlands) Robin Frijns (Germany) René Rast (South Africa) Sheldon van der Linde	Hypercar	381	2nd	2nd
2026	(Belgium) Team WRT	32	BMW M4 GT3 Evo	(Brazil) Augusto Farfus (Indonesia) Sean Gelael (United Kingdom) Darren Leung	LMGT3	334	39th	7th
2026	(Belgium) Team WRT	69	BMW M4 GT3 Evo	(United Kingdom) Dan Harper (United States) Anthony McIntosh (Canada) Parker Thompson	LMGT3	291	DNF	DNF

=== FIA World Endurance Championship results ===
Year	Entrant	Class	No	Chassis	Engine	Drivers	1	2	3	4	5	6	7	8	Pos.	Pts
2021	(Belgium) Team WRT	LMP2	31	Oreca 07	Gibson GK428 4.2L V8	(Netherlands) Robin Frijns (Austria) Ferdinand Habsburg (France) Charles Milesi	SPA; 12	POR; 4	MNZ; 2	LMS; 1	BHR 1; 1	BHR 2; 1			1st	151
2022	(Belgium) Team WRT	LMP2	31	Oreca 07	Gibson GK428 4.2L V8	(Netherlands) Robin Frijns (Indonesia) Sean Gelael (Germany) Rene Rast (Belgium) Dries Vanthoor	SEB; 2	SPA; 1	LMS; Ret	MNZ; 12	FUJ; 1	BHR; 1			2nd	116
2022	(Switzerland) RealTeam by WRT	LMP2	41	Oreca 07	Gibson GK428 4.2L V8	(Portugal) Rui Andrade (Austria) Ferdinand Habsburg (France) Norman Nato	SEB; 3	SPA; 2	LMS; 17	MNZ; 1	FUJ; 4	BHR; 5			4th	96
2023	(Belgium) Team WRT	LMP2	31	Oreca 07	Gibson GK428 4.2L V8	(Netherlands) Robin Frijns (Indonesia) Sean Gelael (Austria) Ferdinand Habsburg	SEB; 6	POR; 6	SPA; 6	LMS; 5	MNZ; Ret	FUJ; 3	BHR; 2		4th	94
2023	(Belgium) Team WRT	LMP2	41	Oreca 07	Gibson GK428 4.2L V8	(Angola) Rui Andrade (Poland) Robert Kubica (Switzerland) Louis Delétraz	SEB; 4	POR; 3	SPA; 1	LMS; 2	MNZ; 3	FUJ; 1	BHR; 1		1st	173
2024	(Belgium) BMW M Team WRT	Hypercar	15	BMW M Hybrid V8	BMW P66/3 4.0 L Turbo V8	(Switzerland) Raffaele Marciello (Belgium) Dries Vanthoor (Germany) Marco Wittmann	QAT; 14	IMO; DSQ	SPA; 11	LMS; Ret	SÃO; 9	COA; 8	FUJ; 2	BHR; 5	14th	39
2024	(Belgium) BMW M Team WRT	Hypercar	20	BMW M Hybrid V8	BMW P66/3 4.0 L Turbo V8	(Netherlands) Robin Frijns (South Africa) Sheldon van der Linde (Germany) René Rast	QAT; 10	IMO; 6	SPA; 13	LMS; NC	SÃO; 14	COA; 13	FUJ; Ret	BHR; Ret	27th	10
2024	(Belgium) Team WRT	LMGT3	31	BMW M4 GT3	BMW S58B30T0 3.0 L Turbo I6	(Brazil) Augusto Farfus (Indonesia) Sean Gelael (United Kingdom) Darren Leung	QAT; 6	IMO; 1	SPA; Ret	LMS; 2	SÃO; 10	COA; 5	FUJ; 10	BHR; 13	4th	85
2024	(Belgium) Team WRT	LMGT3	46	BMW M4 GT3	BMW S58B30T0 3.0 L Turbo I6	(Italy) Valentino Rossi (Belgium) Maxime Martin (Oman) Ahmad Al Harthy	QAT; 4	IMO; 2	SPA; Ret	LMS; Ret	SÃO; 5	COA; NC	FUJ; 3	BHR; 14	6th	61
2025	(Germany) BMW M Team WRT	Hypercar	15	BMW M Hybrid V8	BMW P66/3 4.0 L Turbo V8	(Switzerland) Raffaele Marciello (Belgium) Dries Vanthoor (Denmark) Kevin Magnussen	QAT; 4	IMO; 6	SPA; 10	LMS; 17	SÃO; 17	COA; 12	FUJ; Ret	BHR; Ret	20th	27
2025	(Germany) BMW M Team WRT	Hypercar	20	BMW M Hybrid V8	BMW P66/3 4.0 L Turbo V8	(Netherlands) Robin Frijns (South Africa) Sheldon van der Linde (Germany) René Rast (Germany) Marco Wittmann	QAT; 7	IMO; 2	SPA; Ret	LMS; 16	SÃO; 5	COA; Ret	FUJ; 8	BHR; 8	9th	47
2025	(Belgium) The Bend Team WRT	LMGT3	31	BMW M4 GT3 Evo	BMW S58B30T0 3.0 L Turbo I6	(Brazil) Augusto Farfus; Timur Boguslavskiy (Australia) Yasser Shahin (Brazil) Pedro Ebrahim	QAT; 3	IMO; 12	SPA; Ret	LMS; Ret	SÃO; 12	COA; 9	FUJ; 3	BHR; 7	10th	49
2025	(Belgium) Team WRT	LMGT3	46	BMW M4 GT3 Evo	BMW S58B30T0 3.0 L Turbo I6	(Italy) Valentino Rossi (South Africa) Kelvin van der Linde (Oman) Ahmad Al Harthy	QAT; 11	IMO; 2	SPA; 9	LMS; Ret	SÃO; 10	COA; 2	FUJ; 4	BHR; 15	8th	52
2026*	(Germany) BMW M Team WRT	Hypercar	15	BMW M Hybrid V8	BMW P66/3 4.0 L Turbo V8	(Switzerland) Raffaele Marciello (Belgium) Dries Vanthoor (Denmark) Kevin Magnussen	IMO; 7	SPA; 2	LMS; Ret	SÃO; 1	COA; 8	FUJ; 3	CAT; 7	MNZ; 5	3rd	85
2026*	(Germany) BMW M Team WRT	Hypercar	20	BMW M Hybrid V8	BMW P66/3 4.0 L Turbo V8	(Netherlands) Robin Frijns (South Africa) Sheldon van der Linde (Germany) René Rast	IMO; 5	SPA; 1	LMS; 2	SÃO; 8	COA; 12	FUJ; 13	CAT; 14	MNZ; 7	5th	81
2026*	(Belgium) Team WRT	LMGT3	32	BMW M4 GT3 Evo	BMW S58B30T0 3.0 L Turbo I6	(Brazil) Augusto Farfus (Indonesia) Sean Gelael (United Kingdom) Darren Leung	IMO; 5	SPA; 14	LMS; 7	SÃO; 12	COA; 16	FUJ; 1	CAT; 10	MNZ; Ret	10th	48
2026*	(Belgium) Team WRT	LMGT3	69	BMW M4 GT3 Evo	BMW S58B30T0 3.0 L Turbo I6	(United Kingdom) Dan Harper (United States) Anthony McIntosh (Canada) Parker Thompson	IMO; 1	SPA; 11	LMS; Ret	SÃO; 2	COA; 11	FUJ; 6	CAT; 3	MNZ; 4	3rd	78

* Season still in progress

=== IMSA SportsCar Championship results ===
Year	Entrant	Class	Chassis	Engine	No	Drivers	Rds	1	2	3	4	5	6	7	8	9	Pos.	Pts	MEC
2026	(Belgium) BMW M Team WRT	GTP	BMW M Hybrid V8	BMW P66/3 4.0 L Turbo V8	24	(Netherlands) Robin Frijns (South Africa) Sheldon van der Linde (Germany) René Rast (Belgium) Dries Vanthoor	1	DAY; 3	SEB; 5	LBH; 5	LGA; 9	DET; 9	WGL; 4	ELK; 11	IMS; 1	ATL; 2	4th	2650	25
2026	(Belgium) BMW M Team WRT	GTP	BMW M Hybrid V8	BMW P66/3 4.0 L Turbo V8	25	(Austria) Philipp Eng (Switzerland) Raffaele Marciello (Denmark) Kevin Magnussen (Germany) Marco Wittmann	1	DAY; 8	SEB; 10	LBH; 11	LGA; 3	DET; 2	WGL; 9	ELK; 7	IMS; 10	ATL; 11	10th	2338	23

=== European Le Mans Series ===
Year	Entrant	Class	No	Chassis	Engine	Drivers	1	2	3	4	5	6	Pos.	Pts
2016	(Belgium) Team WRT	LMP2	47	Ligier JS P2	Judd HK 3.6 L V8	(United Kingdom) Will Stevens (Belgium) Dries Vanthoor (Belgium) Laurens Vanthoor	SIL	IMO	RBR	LEC	SPA; 2	EST	11th	18
2021	(Belgium) Team WRT	LMP2	41	Oreca 07	Gibson GK428 4.2L V8	(Switzerland) Louis Delétraz (Poland) Robert Kubica (China) Yifei Ye	CAT; 1	RBR; 1	LEC; 5	MNZ; 4	SPA; 1	ALG; 2	1st	118

=== Bathurst 12 Hours results ===
Year	Team	Drivers	Car	Car#	Class	Laps	Pos.	Class Pos.
2018	(Belgium) Audi Sport Team WRT	(Netherlands) Robin Frijns (United Kingdom) Stuart Leonard (Belgium) Dries Vanthoor	Audi R8 LMS GT3	37	GT3 - APP	271	1st	1st
2018	(Belgium) Audi Sport Team WRT	(Portugal) Pedro Lamy (Austria) Mathias Lauda (Canada) Paul Dalla Lana (Australia) Will Davison	Audi R8 LMS GT3	39	GT3 - APA	267	14th	8th
2023	(Belgium) Team WRT	(South Africa) Sheldon van der Linde (Belgium) Charles Weerts (Belgium) Dries Vanthoor	BMW M4 GT3	32	Pro	323	4th	4th
2023	(Belgium) Team WRT	(Belgium) Maxime Martin (Italy) Valentino Rossi (Brazil) Augusto Farfus	BMW M4 GT3	46	Pro	322	6th	6th
2024	(Belgium) Team WRT	(South Africa) Sheldon van der Linde (Belgium) Charles Weerts (Belgium) Dries Vanthoor	BMW M4 GT3	32	Pro	120	DNF	DNF
2024	(Belgium) Team WRT	(Belgium) Maxime Martin (Italy) Valentino Rossi (Switzerland) Raffaele Marciello	BMW M4 GT3	46	Pro	275	5th	5th
2025	(Belgium) Team WRT	(South Africa) Sheldon van der Linde (South Africa) Kelvin van der Linde (Brazil) Augusto Farfus	BMW M4 GT3	32	Pro	306	1st	1st
2025	(Belgium) Team WRT	(Belgium) Charles Weerts (Italy) Valentino Rossi (Switzerland) Raffaele Marciello	BMW M4 GT3	46	Pro	306	2nd	2nd
2026	(Belgium) Team WRT	(South Africa) Jordan Pepper (South Africa) Kelvin van der Linde (Belgium) Charles Weerts	BMW M4 GT3	32	Pro	262	12th	8th
2026	(Belgium) Team WRT	(Brazil) Augusto Farfus (Switzerland) Raffaele Marciello (Italy) Valentino Rossi	BMW M4 GT3	46	Pro	262	3rd	2nd

=== Deutsche Tourenwagen Masters ===
Year	Car	No	Driver	1	2	3	4	5	6	7	8	9	10	11	12	13	14	15	16	17	18	DC	Points	TC	Points
2019	Audi RS5 Turbo DTM	27	(South Africa) Jonathan Aberdein	HOC1; 1; 15	HOC1; 2; 12	ZOL; 1 Ret	ZOL; 2; 12	MIS; 1; 8	MIS; 2; 7	NOR; 1; 13	NOR; 2; 14	ASS; 1; 6	ASS; 2; 4	BRH; 1; 9	BRH; 2; 13	LAU; 1; 14	LAU; 2; 7	NÜR; 1; 4	NÜR; 2; 5	HOC2; 1; 14	HOC2; 2 Ret	10th	67	7th	79
2019	Audi RS5 Turbo DTM	21	(Brazil) Pietro Fittipaldi	HOC1; 1; 10	HOC1; 2; 15	ZOL; 1; 14	ZOL; 2; 9	MIS; 1	MIS; 2	NOR; 1 Ret	NOR; 2; 15	ASS; 1; 11	ASS; 2; 10	BRH; 1 DNS	BRH; 2; 16	LAU; 1; 7	LAU; 2; 9	NÜR; 1; 15	NÜR; 2; 13	HOC2; 1; 15	HOC2; 2; 15	15th	22	7th	79
2019	Audi RS5 Turbo DTM	34	(Italy) Andrea Dovizioso	HOC1; 1	HOC1; 2	ZOL; 1	ZOL; 2	MIS; 1; 12	MIS; 2; 15	NOR; 1	NOR; 2	ASS; 1	ASS; 2	BRH; 1	BRH; 2	LAU; 1	LAU; 2	NÜR; 1	NÜR; 2	HOC2; 1	HOC2; 2	NC	0	7th	79
2020	Audi RS5 Turbo DTM	10	(United Kingdom) Harrison Newey	SPA; 1; 13	SPA; 2 Ret	LAU1; 1; 10	LAU1; 2; 12	LAU2; 1; 15	LAU2; 2; 13	ASS; 1; 12	ASS; 2; 15	NÜR1; 1; 14	NÜR1; 2; 13	NÜR2; 1; 11	NÜR2; 2; 11	ZOL1; 1; 5	ZOL1; 1; 6	ZOL2; 1; 7	ZOL2; 1; 9	HOC; 1 Ret	HOC; 2; 13	14th	27	7th	103
2020	Audi RS5 Turbo DTM	13	(Switzerland) Fabio Scherer	SPA; 1; 12	SPA; 2; 12	LAU1; 1; 14	LAU1; 2; 11	LAU2; 1; 11	LAU2; 2; 13	ASS; 1; 15	ASS; 2 Ret	NÜR1; 1; 15	NÜR1; 2; 16†	NÜR2; 1 Ret	NÜR2; 2; 14	ZOL1; 1; 13	ZOL1; 1; 5	ZOL2; 1; 5	ZOL2; 1 Ret	HOC; 1; 13†	HOC; 2; 12	16th	20	7th	103
2020	Audi RS5 Turbo DTM	62	(Austria) Ferdinand Habsburg	SPA; 1 DNS	SPA; 2; 15	LAU1; 1; 6	LAU1; 2; 10	LAU2; 1; 11	LAU2; 2; 14	ASS; 1; 8	ASS; 2; 7	NÜR1; 1; 11	NÜR1; 2; 15	NÜR2; 1; 7	NÜR2; 2; 6^{2}	ZOL1; 1; 7	ZOL1; 1; 7	ZOL2; 1; 3^{2}	ZOL2; 1; 10^{1}	HOC; 1; 11	HOC; 2; 14	10th	68	7th	103
