= 6 Hours of Barcelona =

Sports car endurance race in Spain

(Spain) 6 Hours of Barcelona

FIA World Endurance Championship
- Venue: Circuit de Barcelona-Catalunya (2008–2009, 2025–present); Montjuïc (1933, 1967–1968, 1971)
- Location: Montmeló, Barcelona, Catalonia, Spain
- First race: 1933
- First WEC race: 2026
- Duration: 6 hours
- Most wins (driver): (Spain) Juan Fernández (2) (Spain) Francisco Godia Sales (2)
- Most wins (team): (Spain) Escuderia Montjuïc (2)
- Most wins (manufacturer): (Germany) Porsche (3)

The 6 Hours of Barcelona (formerly the 1000 Kilometres of Catalunya and 12 Hours of Catalunya) is an endurance race for sports cars, held at the Circuit de Barcelona-Catalunya in Montmeló, Barcelona, Catalonia, Spain.

== History ==
The Circuit de Barcelona-Catalunya previously hosted the Prologue for the 2019–20 FIA World Endurance Championship. The first WEC 6-hour race is scheduled for the 2026 FIA World Endurance Championship, replacing the cancelled Qatar 1812 km and 8 Hours of Bahrain.

== Winners ==
Year	Drivers	Team	Car	Time	Laps	Championship	Circuit	Report
1000 km distance
1933	(Second Spanish Republic) Ignacio Macaya (Second Spanish Republic) José Pons		Ford 3620cc			Non-championship	Montjuïc	Report
1934–1966: Not held
6 Hour distance
1967	(Spain) Javier de Vilar (Spain) Juan Fernández		Porsche 911 S		169	Non-championship	Montjuïc	Report
1968	(Australia) Brian Muir (Spain) Francisco Godia Sales	(Spain) Escuderia Montjuïc	Ford GT40		196	Non-championship	Montjuïc	Report
12 Hour distance
1969	(Spain) Francisco Godia Sales (Spain) Juan Fernández	(Spain) Escuderia Montjuïc	Porsche 908		406	Non-championship	Montjuïc	Report
1970: Not held
1000 km distance
1971	(Sweden) Jo Bonnier (Sweden) Ronnie Peterson	(Italy) Scuderia Filipinetti	Lola T212-Ford		264	Non-championship	Montjuïc	Report
1972–2007: Not held
2008	(France) Nicolas Minassian (Spain) Marc Gené	(France) Team Peugeot Total	Peugeot 908 HDi FAP	5:59:30.8120	215	Le Mans Series	Catalunya	Report
2009	(Czech Republic) Jan Charouz (Czech Republic) Tomáš Enge (Germany) Stefan Mücke	(United Kingdom) Aston Martin Racing	Lola-Aston Martin B09/60	6:00:05.674	209	Le Mans Series	Catalunya	Report
2010–2024: Not held
6 Hour distance
2025	(Denmark) Simon Birch (Denmark) Thomas Andersen	(Austria) razoon - more than racing	Porsche 911 (992 I) GT3 R	6:01:57.908	181	Non-championship	Catalunya	Report
2026	(Switzerland) Sébastien Buemi (New Zealand) Brendon Hartley (Japan) Ryo Hirakawa	(Japan) Toyota Racing	Toyota TR010 Hybrid	6:01:20.906	198	FIA World Endurance Championship	Catalunya	Report
