= 2020 Lone Star Le Mans =

Endurance sportscar racing event in Austin, Texas

(United States) 2020 Lone Star Le Mans
Event information
- Round 5 of 8 in the 2019-20 FIA World Endurance Championship
- Date: 23 February 2019-20
- Location: Austin, Texas
- Venue: Circuit of the Americas
- Duration: 6 Hours

Results
- Laps completed: 189
- Distance (km): 1041.957
- Distance (miles): 647.514
- LMP1

Pole position
- Time: 1:47.530
- Team: (Switzerland) Rebellion Racing

Winners
- Team: (Switzerland) Rebellion Racing
- Drivers: (United States) Gustavo Menezes (France) Norman Nato (Brazil) Bruno Senna
- LMP2

Winners
- Team: (United Kingdom) United Autosports
- Drivers: (Portugal) Filipe Albuquerque (United Kingdom) Philip Hanson (United Kingdom) Paul di Resta
- LMGTE Pro

Winners
- Team: (United Kingdom) Aston Martin Racing
- Drivers: (Denmark) Marco Sørensen (Denmark) Nicki Thiim
- LMGTE Am

Winners
- Team: (United Kingdom) TF Sport
- Drivers: (United Kingdom) Jonathan Adam (Republic of Ireland) Charlie Eastwood (Turkey) Salih Yoluç

The 2020 Lone Star Le Mans was an endurance sportscar racing event held on 23 February 2020, as the fifth round of the 2019–20 FIA World Endurance Championship. This marked the return of the FIA WEC to the Circuit of the Americas for the first time since 2017, and the inaugural running of the race under the banner of Lone Star Le Mans, which had previously been utilised by the WeatherTech SportsCar Championship for races run at COTA, while WEC races occurring on the same weekend had been run as the 6 Hours of Circuit of the Americas.

== Background ==
The provisional calendar for the 2019–20 FIA World Endurance Championship was unveiled at the 2018 6 Hours of Silverstone, featuring eight races, on five continents, starting at Silverstone in September 2019 with a four-hour race, and ending with the 24 Hours of Le Mans in June 2020. The calendar saw the events from the previous seasons carried over, while bringing back the rounds held at the Bahrain International Circuit, and the Autódromo José Carlos Pace, which had last been held in 2017, and in 2014 respectively. The 6 Hours of São Paulo would serve as the 5th round, and was planned to be held on 1 February 2020.

On 10 November 2019, FIA WEC boss Gerard Neveu issued a warning to teams regarding the 6 Hours of São Paulo, stating that the promoter of the event, N/Duduch Motorsports, was facing issues in meeting its contractual recruitments, with some of the issues being of financial nature, with Neveu stating that the championship would make a decision on the event before December 2019. At the time, several venues were considered to replace Interlagos, including Kyalami, the Autódromo Hermanos Rodríguez in Mexico City, as well as the Circuit of the Americas.

On 2 December 2019, it was announced by the WEC, that the 6 Hours of São Paulo would be cancelled, and replaced by the Lone Star Le Mans at Circuit of the Americas, to be held from 22 to 23 February 2020, with the race being 6 hours long. The date was moved back from the Interlagos round's original 1 February date, due to the Super Bowl LIV being held on the same date, while the Formula E championship was scheduled to hold the Mexico City ePrix on the weekend of 14–15 February.

== Entry list ==
On 3 February 2020, it was announced that Team LNT had withdrawn from the entry list for the event due to necessary maintenance that the cars needed. The team still planned to return to the grid at Sebring however. The withdrawal of both Ginetta G60-LT-P1s meant that the car count was now 29.

The DragonSpeed team who were initially denied entry for the COTA round were now able to secure a spot in the COTA round. The team, a day later, confirmed their driver line-up to be that of their 24 Hours of Daytona entry; Colin Braun, Ben Hanley, who also drove for Team LNT, and Henrik Hedman.

Furthermore, on the 5 February 2020, ex-Corvette Racing drivers Jan Magnussen and Mike Rockenfeller would return to the team for two rounds of the 2019–20 season as a duo in the new Corvette C8.R. The two also planned compete in the round at Sebring International Raceway in March.

German driver Laurents Hörr would replace David Heinemeier Hansson in the No. 56 Team Project 1 Porsche for the rest of the season.

These additional entries brought the total number of cars back to 31; 3 LMP1s, 9 LMP2s, 7 LMGTE Pro cars and 11 in LMGTE Am.

== Qualifying ==
=== Results ===
Pole Position winners in each class are in bold

Pos	Class	Team	Average Time	Gap	Grid
1	**LMP1**	**No. 1 Rebellion Racing**	**1:47.530**	-	**1**
2	LMP1	No. 7 Toyota Gazoo Racing	1:49.161	+1.631	2
3	LMP1	No. 8 Toyota Gazoo Racing	1:49.431	+0.270	3
**4**	**LMP2**	**No. 42 Cool Racing**	**1:49.910**	**+0.479**	**4**
5	LMP2	No. 22 United Autosports	1:50.073	+0.163	5
6	LMP2	No. 36 Signatech Alpine Elf	1:50.984	+0.911	6
7	LMP2	No. 37 Jackie Chan DC Racing	1:51.354	+0.370	7
8	LMP2	No. 38 Jota Sport	1:51.592	+0.238	8
9	LMP2	No. 33 High Class Racing	1:51.747	+0.155	9
10	LMP2	No. 21 DragonSpeed	1:52.765	+1.018	10
11	LMP2	No. 29 Racing Team Nederland	1:53.131	+0.366	11
12	LMP2	No. 47 Cetilar Racing	1:54.305	+1.174	12
13	**LMGTE-Pro**	**No. 95 Aston Martin Racing**	**2:00.733**	**+6.428**	**13**
14	LMGTE-Pro	No. 92 Porsche GT Team	2:00.952	+0.219	14
15	LMGTE-Pro	No. 97 Aston Martin Racing	2:01.029	+0.077	15
16	LMGTE-Pro	No. 51 AF Corse	2:01.031	+0.002	16
17	LMGTE-Pro	No. 91 Porsche GT Team	2:01.049	+0.018	17
18	LMGTE-Pro	No. 71 AF Corse	2:01.229	+0.180	18
19	**LMGTE-Am**	**No. 56 Team Project 1**	**2:02.784**	**+1.555**	**19**
20	LMGTE-Am	No. 98 Aston Martin Racing	2:02.830	+0.046	20
21	LMGTE-Am	No. 90 TF Sport	2:02.909	+0.079	21
22	LMGTE-Pro	No. 63 Corvette Racing	2:02.967	+0.058	22
23	LMGTE-Am	No. 77 Dempsey-Proton Racing	2:03.110	+0.143	23
24	LMGTE-Am	No. 83 AF Corse	2:03.376	+0.266	24
25	LMGTE-Am	No. 57 Team Project 1	2:03.450	+0.074	25
26	LMGTE-Am	No. 54 AF Corse	2:03.462	+0.012	26
27	LMGTE-Am	No. 88 Dempsey-Proton Racing	2:03.682	+0.220	27
28	LMGTE-Am	No. 70 MR Racing	2:03.781	+0.099	28
29	LMGTE-Am	No. 62 Red River Sport	2:03.964	+0.183	29
30	LMGTE-Am	No. 86 Gulf Racing	2:04.296	+0.332	30

== Race ==
=== Results ===
The minimum number of laps for classification (70% of the overall winning car's race distance) was 132 laps. Class winners are denoted in bold and with ‡.

Pos	Class	No	Team	Drivers	Chassis	Tyre	Laps	Time/Retired
Pos	Class	No	Team	Drivers	Engine	Tyre	Laps	Time/Retired
1	**LMP1**	**1**	**(Switzerland) Rebellion Racing**	**(United States) Gustavo Menezes (France) Norman Nato (Brazil) Bruno Senna**	**Rebellion R13**	M	**189**	**6:01:37.705‡**
1	**LMP1**	**1**	**(Switzerland) Rebellion Racing**	**(United States) Gustavo Menezes (France) Norman Nato (Brazil) Bruno Senna**	**Gibson GL458 4.5 L V8**	M	**189**	**6:01:37.705‡**
2	LMP1	8	(Japan) Toyota Gazoo Racing	(Switzerland) Sébastien Buemi (New Zealand) Brendon Hartley (Japan) Kazuki Nakajima	Toyota TS050 Hybrid	M	189	+51.524
2	LMP1	8	(Japan) Toyota Gazoo Racing	(Switzerland) Sébastien Buemi (New Zealand) Brendon Hartley (Japan) Kazuki Nakajima	Toyota 2.4 L Turbo V6	M	189	+51.524
3	LMP1	7	(Japan) Toyota Gazoo Racing	(United Kingdom) Mike Conway (Japan) Kamui Kobayashi (Argentina) José María López	Toyota TS050 Hybrid	M	187	+2 Laps
3	LMP1	7	(Japan) Toyota Gazoo Racing	(United Kingdom) Mike Conway (Japan) Kamui Kobayashi (Argentina) José María López	Toyota 2.4 L Turbo V6	M	187	+2 Laps
4	**LMP2**	**22**	**(United Kingdom) United Autosports**	**(Portugal) Filipe Albuquerque (United Kingdom) Philip Hanson (United Kingdom) Paul di Resta**	**Oreca 07**	M	**182**	**+7 Laps‡**
4	**LMP2**	**22**	**(United Kingdom) United Autosports**	**(Portugal) Filipe Albuquerque (United Kingdom) Philip Hanson (United Kingdom) Paul di Resta**	**Gibson GK428 4.2 L V8**	M	**182**	**+7 Laps‡**
5	LMP2	37	(China) Jackie Chan DC Racing	(China) Ho-Pin Tung (France) Gabriel Aubry (United Kingdom) Will Stevens	Oreca 07	G	182	+7 Laps
5	LMP2	37	(China) Jackie Chan DC Racing	(China) Ho-Pin Tung (France) Gabriel Aubry (United Kingdom) Will Stevens	Gibson GK428 4.2 L V8	G	182	+7 Laps
6	LMP2	38	(United Kingdom) Jota Sport	(Portugal) António Félix da Costa (United Kingdom) Anthony Davidson (Mexico) Roberto González	Oreca 07	G	181	+8 Laps
6	LMP2	38	(United Kingdom) Jota Sport	(Portugal) António Félix da Costa (United Kingdom) Anthony Davidson (Mexico) Roberto González	Gibson GK428 4.2 L V8	G	181	+8 Laps
7	LMP2	42	(Switzerland) Cool Racing	(Switzerland) Antonin Borga (Switzerland) Alexander Coigny (France) Nicolas Lapierre	Oreca 07	M	181	+8 Laps
7	LMP2	42	(Switzerland) Cool Racing	(Switzerland) Antonin Borga (Switzerland) Alexander Coigny (France) Nicolas Lapierre	Gibson GK428 4.2 L V8	M	181	+8 Laps
8	LMP2	29	(Netherlands) Racing Team Nederland	(Netherlands) Frits van Eerd (Netherlands) Giedo van der Garde (Netherlands) Nyck de Vries	Oreca 07	M	181	+8 Laps
8	LMP2	29	(Netherlands) Racing Team Nederland	(Netherlands) Frits van Eerd (Netherlands) Giedo van der Garde (Netherlands) Nyck de Vries	Gibson GK428 4.2 L V8	M	181	+8 Laps
9	LMP2	36	(France) Signatech Alpine Elf	(France) Thomas Laurent (Brazil) André Negrão (France) Pierre Ragues	Alpine A470	M	180	+9 Laps
9	LMP2	36	(France) Signatech Alpine Elf	(France) Thomas Laurent (Brazil) André Negrão (France) Pierre Ragues	Gibson GK428 4.2 L V8	M	180	+9 Laps
10	LMP2	33	(Denmark) High Class Racing	(Denmark) Anders Fjordbach (United States) Mark Patterson (Japan) Kenta Yamashita	Oreca 07	M	179	+10 Laps
10	LMP2	33	(Denmark) High Class Racing	(Denmark) Anders Fjordbach (United States) Mark Patterson (Japan) Kenta Yamashita	Gibson GK428 4.2 L V8	M	179	+10 Laps
11	LMP2	47	(Italy) Cetilar Racing	(Italy) Andrea Belicchi (Italy) Roberto Lacorte (Italy) Giorgio Sernagiotto	Dallara P217	M	178	+11 Laps
11	LMP2	47	(Italy) Cetilar Racing	(Italy) Andrea Belicchi (Italy) Roberto Lacorte (Italy) Giorgio Sernagiotto	Gibson GK428 4.2 L V8	M	178	+11 Laps
12	LMP2	21	(United States) DragonSpeed	(United States) Colin Braun (United Kingdom) Ben Hanley (Sweden) Henrik Hedman	Oreca 07	M	177	+12 Laps
12	LMP2	21	(United States) DragonSpeed	(United States) Colin Braun (United Kingdom) Ben Hanley (Sweden) Henrik Hedman	Gibson GK428 4.2 L V8	M	177	+12 Laps
13	**LMGTE Pro**	**95**	**(United Kingdom) Aston Martin Racing**	**(Denmark) Marco Sørensen (Denmark) Nicki Thiim**	**Aston Martin Vantage AMR**	M	**173**	**+16 Laps‡**
13	**LMGTE Pro**	**95**	**(United Kingdom) Aston Martin Racing**	**(Denmark) Marco Sørensen (Denmark) Nicki Thiim**	**Aston Martin 4.0 L Turbo V8**	M	**173**	**+16 Laps‡**
14	LMGTE Pro	92	(Germany) Porsche GT Team	(Denmark) Michael Christensen (France) Kévin Estre	Porsche 911 RSR-19	M	172	+17 Laps
14	LMGTE Pro	92	(Germany) Porsche GT Team	(Denmark) Michael Christensen (France) Kévin Estre	Porsche 4.2 L Flat-6	M	172	+17 Laps
15	LMGTE Pro	51	(Italy) AF Corse	(United Kingdom) James Calado (Italy) Alessandro Pier Guidi	Ferrari 488 GTE Evo	M	172	+17 Laps
15	LMGTE Pro	51	(Italy) AF Corse	(United Kingdom) James Calado (Italy) Alessandro Pier Guidi	Ferrari F154CB 3.9 L Turbo V8	M	172	+17 Laps
16	LMGTE Pro	97	(United Kingdom) Aston Martin Racing	(United Kingdom) Alex Lynn (Belgium) Maxime Martin	Aston Martin Vantage AMR	M	172	+17 Laps
16	LMGTE Pro	97	(United Kingdom) Aston Martin Racing	(United Kingdom) Alex Lynn (Belgium) Maxime Martin	Aston Martin 4.0 L Turbo V8	M	172	+17 Laps
17	LMGTE Pro	71	(Italy) AF Corse	(Spain) Miguel Molina (Italy) Davide Rigon	Ferrari 488 GTE Evo	M	172	+17 Laps
17	LMGTE Pro	71	(Italy) AF Corse	(Spain) Miguel Molina (Italy) Davide Rigon	Ferrari F154CB 3.9 L Turbo V8	M	172	+17 Laps
18	LMGTE Pro	63	(United States) Corvette Racing	(Denmark) Jan Magnussen (Germany) Mike Rockenfeller	Chevrolet Corvette C8.R	M	170	+19 Laps
18	LMGTE Pro	63	(United States) Corvette Racing	(Denmark) Jan Magnussen (Germany) Mike Rockenfeller	Chevrolet 5.5 L V8	M	170	+19 Laps
19	**LMGTE Am**	**90**	**(United Kingdom) TF Sport**	**(United Kingdom) Jonathan Adam (Republic of Ireland) Charlie Eastwood (Turkey) Salih Yoluç**	**Aston Martin Vantage AMR**	M	**170**	**+19 Laps‡**
19	**LMGTE Am**	**90**	**(United Kingdom) TF Sport**	**(United Kingdom) Jonathan Adam (Republic of Ireland) Charlie Eastwood (Turkey) Salih Yoluç**	**Aston Martin 4.0 L Turbo V8**	M	**170**	**+19 Laps‡**
20	LMGTE Am	98	(United Kingdom) Aston Martin Racing	(Canada) Paul Dalla Lana (United Kingdom) Ross Gunn (United Kingdom) Darren Turner	Aston Martin Vantage AMR	M	170	+19 Laps
20	LMGTE Am	98	(United Kingdom) Aston Martin Racing	(Canada) Paul Dalla Lana (United Kingdom) Ross Gunn (United Kingdom) Darren Turner	Aston Martin 4.0 L Turbo V8	M	170	+19 Laps
21	LMGTE Pro	91	(Germany) Porsche GT Team	(Italy) Gianmaria Bruni (Austria) Richard Lietz	Porsche 911 RSR-19	M	170	+19 Laps
21	LMGTE Pro	91	(Germany) Porsche GT Team	(Italy) Gianmaria Bruni (Austria) Richard Lietz	Porsche 4.2 L Flat-6	M	170	+19 Laps
22	LMGTE Am	56	(Germany) Team Project 1	(Italy) Matteo Cairoli (Germany) Laurents Hörr (Norway) Egidio Perfetti	Porsche 911 RSR	M	170	+19 Laps
22	LMGTE Am	56	(Germany) Team Project 1	(Italy) Matteo Cairoli (Germany) Laurents Hörr (Norway) Egidio Perfetti	Porsche 4.0 L Flat-6	M	170	+19 Laps
23	LMGTE Am	83	(Italy) AF Corse	(France) Emmanuel Collard (Denmark) Nicklas Nielsen (France) François Perrodo	Ferrari 488 GTE Evo	M	170	+19 Laps
23	LMGTE Am	83	(Italy) AF Corse	(France) Emmanuel Collard (Denmark) Nicklas Nielsen (France) François Perrodo	Ferrari F154CB 3.9 L Turbo V8	M	170	+19 Laps
24	LMGTE Am	77	(Germany) Dempsey-Proton Racing	(Australia) Matt Campbell (Italy) Riccardo Pera (Germany) Christian Ried	Porsche 911 RSR	M	169	+20 Laps
24	LMGTE Am	77	(Germany) Dempsey-Proton Racing	(Australia) Matt Campbell (Italy) Riccardo Pera (Germany) Christian Ried	Porsche 4.0 L Flat-6	M	169	+20 Laps
25	LMGTE Am	86	(United Kingdom) Gulf Racing	(United Kingdom) Ben Barker (United Kingdom) Michael Wainwright (United Kingdom) Andrew Watson	Porsche 911 RSR	M	169	+20 Laps
25	LMGTE Am	86	(United Kingdom) Gulf Racing	(United Kingdom) Ben Barker (United Kingdom) Michael Wainwright (United Kingdom) Andrew Watson	Porsche 4.0 L Flat-6	M	169	+20 Laps
26	LMGTE Am	54	(Italy) AF Corse	(Italy) Francesco Castellacci (Italy) Giancarlo Fisichella (Switzerland) Thomas Flohr	Ferrari 488 GTE Evo	M	168	+21 Laps
26	LMGTE Am	54	(Italy) AF Corse	(Italy) Francesco Castellacci (Italy) Giancarlo Fisichella (Switzerland) Thomas Flohr	Ferrari F154CB 3.9 L Turbo V8	M	168	+21 Laps
27	LMGTE Am	62	(United Kingdom) Red River Sport	(United Kingdom) Bonamy Grimes (United Kingdom) Charles Hollings (United Kingdom) Johnny Mowlem	Ferrari 488 GTE Evo	M	168	+21 Laps
27	LMGTE Am	62	(United Kingdom) Red River Sport	(United Kingdom) Bonamy Grimes (United Kingdom) Charles Hollings (United Kingdom) Johnny Mowlem	Ferrari F154CB 3.9 L Turbo V8	M	168	+21 Laps
28	LMGTE Am	88	(Germany) Dempsey-Proton Racing	(United States) Bret Curtis (Belgium) Adrien de Leener (Austria) Thomas Preining	Porsche 911 RSR	M	168	+21 Laps
28	LMGTE Am	88	(Germany) Dempsey-Proton Racing	(United States) Bret Curtis (Belgium) Adrien de Leener (Austria) Thomas Preining	Porsche 4.0 L Flat-6	M	168	+21 Laps
29	LMGTE Am	70	(Japan) MR Racing	(Monaco) Olivier Beretta (Japan) Kei Cozzolino (Japan) Motoaki Ishikawa	Ferrari 488 GTE Evo	M	168	+21 Laps
29	LMGTE Am	70	(Japan) MR Racing	(Monaco) Olivier Beretta (Japan) Kei Cozzolino (Japan) Motoaki Ishikawa	Ferrari F154CB 3.9 L Turbo V8	M	168	+21 Laps
30	LMGTE Am	57	(Germany) Team Project 1	(Netherlands) Jeroen Bleekemolen (Brazil) Felipe Fraga (United States) Ben Keating	Porsche 911 RSR	M	160	+29 Laps
30	LMGTE Am	57	(Germany) Team Project 1	(Netherlands) Jeroen Bleekemolen (Brazil) Felipe Fraga (United States) Ben Keating	Porsche 4.0 L Flat-6	M	160	+29 Laps
