= Juan Fernández (racing driver) =

Spanish racing driver (1930–2020)

- Born: Juan Fernández García; 13 February 1930; Sabadell, Spain
- Died: 22 June 2020 (aged 90); Sabadell, Spain
- Occupation: Racing driver

Juan Fernández García (13 February 1930 – 22 June 2020) was a Spanish racing driver, specializing in hillclimbing.

His career lasted from 1964 to 1990. He raced in the Porsche 911, the Porsche 908, the Osella PA9, and the Lola. He finished fifth in the 1973 24 Hours of Le Mans alongside Francisco Torredemer and Bernard Chenevière. He won the European Hill Climb Championship in the Sports Car Category in 1973 and 1974.

Fernández died in Sabadell on 22 June 2020 at the age of 90.
