= Lone Star Le Mans =

Endurance sports car event

FIA World Endurance Championship
- Venue: Circuit of the Americas
- First race: 2013
- First WEC race: 2013
- Duration: 6 hours (for WEC); 2 hours 40 minutes (for IMSA)
- Previous names: 6 Hours of Circuit of the Americas (2013–2017)
- Most wins (driver): (Germany) Timo Bernhard (3) (New Zealand) Brendon Hartley (3)
- Most wins (team): (Germany) Porsche Team (3)
- Most wins (manufacturer): (Germany) Porsche (4)

The Lone Star Le Mans (previously known as 6 Hours of the Circuit of the Americas) is an endurance race for Le Mans Prototypes and grand tourer-style cars held at the Circuit of the Americas in Austin, Texas. Its first running was on 22 September 2013 as the fifth round of the 2013 FIA World Endurance Championship season.

The name "Lone Star Le Mans" had previously been used for the Austin round of the United SportsCar Championship, now the IMSA SportsCar Championship, from 2014 to 2016.

On 2 December 2019, the Austin round of the WEC was revived for 2020, as a result of a conflict between the promoters at the Autodromo Jose Carlos Pace and the WEC, where the Austin round replaced the 6 Hours of São Paulo.

On 9 June 2023, the schedule for the 2024 FIA World Endurance Championship was announced, with Austin returning to the schedule on 1 September as the 6th race of the season, effectively replacing the 1000 Miles of Sebring (a race specially created just for the WEC) as the American round of the championship.

== Results ==
=== FIA WEC races ===
Year	Overall winner(s)	Entrant	Car	Distance/Duration	Race title	Championship	Report	Ref
2013	(United Kingdom) Allan McNish (Denmark) Tom Kristensen (France) Loïc Duval	(Germany) Audi Sport Team Joest	Audi R18 e-tron quattro	6 hours	6 Hours of Circuit of the Americas	FIA World Endurance Championship	Report	
2014	(Switzerland) Marcel Fässler (Germany) André Lotterer (France) Benoît Tréluyer	(Germany) Audi Sport Team Joest	Audi R18 e-tron quattro	6 hours	6 Hours of Circuit of the Americas	FIA World Endurance Championship	Report	
2015	(Australia) Mark Webber (Germany) Timo Bernhard (New Zealand) Brendon Hartley	(Germany) Porsche Team	Porsche 919 Hybrid	6 hours	6 Hours of Circuit of the Americas	FIA World Endurance Championship	Report	
2016	(Australia) Mark Webber (Germany) Timo Bernhard (New Zealand) Brendon Hartley	(Germany) Porsche Team	Porsche 919 Hybrid	6 hours	6 Hours of Circuit of the Americas	FIA World Endurance Championship	Report	
2017	(New Zealand) Earl Bamber (Germany) Timo Bernhard (New Zealand) Brendon Hartley	(Germany) Porsche Team	Porsche 919 Hybrid	6 hours	6 Hours of Circuit of the Americas	FIA World Endurance Championship	Report	
2018–2019: Not held
2020	(United States) Gustavo Menezes (France) Norman Nato (Brazil) Bruno Senna	(Switzerland) Rebellion Racing	Rebellion R13	6 hours	Lone Star Le Mans	FIA World Endurance Championship	Report	
2021–2023: Not held
2024	(Poland) Robert Kubica (Israel) Robert Shwartzman (China) Yifei Ye	(Italy) AF Corse	Ferrari 499P	6 hours	Lone Star Le Mans	FIA World Endurance Championship	Report	
2025	(Australia) Matt Campbell (France) Kévin Estre (Belgium) Laurens Vanthoor	(Germany) Porsche Penske Motorsport	Porsche 963	6 hours	Lone Star Le Mans	FIA World Endurance Championship	Report	
2026	(Italy) Antonio Fuoco (Spain) Miguel Molina (Denmark) Nicklas Nielsen	(Italy) Ferrari AF Corse	Ferrari 499P	6 hours	Lone Star Le Mans	FIA World Endurance Championship	Report	

=== Other races ===
Year	Overall winner(s)	Entrant	Car	Distance/Duration	Race title	Championship	Report	Ref
2013 (Grand-Am)	(United States) Jon Fogarty (United States) Alex Gurney	(United States) GAINSCO/Bob Stallings Racing	Corvette DP	2 hours 45 minutes	Grand-Am of The Americas presented by GAINSCO and TOTAL	Rolex Sports Car Series	Report	
2013 (ALMS)	(Germany) Lucas Luhr (Germany) Klaus Graf	(United States) Muscle Milk Pickett Racing	HPD ARX-03c	2 hours 45 minutes	International Sports Car Weekend	American Le Mans Series	Report	
2014	(United States) Scott Pruett (Mexico) Memo Rojas	(United States) Chip Ganassi Racing	Ford EcoBoost Riley DP	2 hours 45 minutes	Lone Star Le Mans	United SportsCar Championship	Report	
2015	(United States) Scott Pruett (United States) Joey Hand	(United States) Chip Ganassi Racing	Ford EcoBoost Riley DP	2 hours 40 minutes	Lone Star Le Mans	United SportsCar Championship	Report	
2016	(United States) Jordan Taylor (United States) Ricky Taylor	(United States) Wayne Taylor Racing	Dallara Corvette DP	2 hours 40 minutes	Lone Star Le Mans	IMSA SportsCar Championship	Report	
2017	(United States) Jordan Taylor (United States) Ricky Taylor	(United States) Wayne Taylor Racing	Cadillac DPi-V.R	2 hours 40 minutes	Advance Auto Parts Sportscar Showdown	IMSA SportsCar Championship	Report	

== 6 Hours of the Americas ==
The 6 Hours of the Americas was an event organised by the Stéphane Ratel Organisation (SRO) and would have been part of the inaugural season of the Intercontinental GT Challenge on March 6, 2016. On January 29, it was announced that the race would be cancelled with the official reason stated as a lack of entrants.
