= 6 Hours of Imola =

Sports car endurance race in Italy

(Italy) 6 Hours of Imola

FIA World Endurance Championship
- Venue: Imola Circuit
- Location: Imola, Emilia-Romagna, Italy
- First race: 1974
- First WEC race: 2024
- Duration: 6 hours
- Most wins (driver): 17 drivers (1)
- Most wins (team): Toyota Racing (2)
- Most wins (manufacturer): Toyota (2)

The 6 Hours of Imola, formerly 1000 km of Imola, is an endurance race for sports cars, held at the Autodromo Enzo e Dino Ferrari in Imola, Italy.

== History ==
The first 6 Hours race was held as the fourth round of the 2011 Intercontinental Le Mans Cup and the third round of the 2011 Le Mans Series. The circuit was dropped from the newly founded FIA World Endurance Championship and European Le Mans Series calendar in 2012. In 2013, the circuit returned to the 2013 European Le Mans Series calendar, however the race was held for 3 hours.

With the announcement of 2024 FIA World Endurance Championship calendar on 9 June 2023 at the Automobile Club de l'Ouest press conference, the race was revived again by replacing the 6 Hours of Monza. The Italian round of the World Endurance Championship, 6 Hours of Monza had been held at Monza in July between 2021 and 2023. However, to accommodate an extra non-European round of the championship the Italian race needed to be moved from July to April; with Monza undergoing upgrade works in April, the circuit was unable to host the race, so the Italian round was shifted to Imola instead of Monza. Despite the fact that the race was originally intended as a one-off race, it was announced on 14 June 2024 that Imola will continue to host FIA World Endurance Championship races until 2028 after signing a 4-year contract extension.

== Results ==
Year	Overall winner(s)	Entrant	Car	Time	Laps	Distance/Duration	Championship	Report
1000 km distance
1974	(France) Gérard Larrousse (France) Henri Pescarolo	(France) Equipe Gitanes	Matra-Simca MS670C		198	1001.880 km	World Sportscar Championship; Campionato Italiano Sport	report
1975–1982: Not held
1983	(Italy) Teo Fabi (West Germany) Hans Heyer	(Italy) Martini Racing	Lancia LC2	6 hours	191	962.640 km	European Endurance Championship	report
1984	(West Germany) Hans-Joachim Stuck (West Germany) Stefan Bellof	(Switzerland) Brun Motorsport	Porsche 956B	5:54:56.32	199	1002.960 km	World Sportscar Championship; Deutsche Rennsport Meisterschaft	report
1985–2010: Not held
6 Hour distance
2011	(United Kingdom) Anthony Davidson (France) Sébastien Bourdais	(France) Team Peugeot Total	Peugeot 908	6:01:01.623	220	1079.762 km	Intercontinental Le Mans Cup; Le Mans Series	Report
2012–2023: Not held
2024	(United Kingdom) Mike Conway (Japan) Kamui Kobayashi (Netherlands) Nyck de Vries	(Japan) Toyota Gazoo Racing	Toyota GR010 Hybrid	6:00:34.717	205	1006.127 km	FIA World Endurance Championship	Report
2025	(United Kingdom) James Calado (Italy) Antonio Giovinazzi (Italy) Alessandro Pier Guidi	(Italy) Ferrari AF Corse	Ferrari 499P	6:00:28.365	212	1040.490 km	FIA World Endurance Championship	Report
2026	(Switzerland) Sébastien Buemi (New Zealand) Brendon Hartley (Japan) Ryō Hirakawa	(Japan) Toyota Racing	Toyota TR010 Hybrid	6:00:10.939	213	1045.617 km	FIA World Endurance Championship	Report
