= Qatar 1812 km =

Endurance sports car event

FIA World Endurance Championship
- Venue: Lusail International Circuit
- Location: Lusail, Qatar
- Corporate sponsor: Qatar Airways
- First race: 2024
- Distance: 1,814.75 km (1,127.633 mi)
- Laps: 335
- Duration: 10-hour time limit
- Most wins (driver): (France) Kévin Estre (Germany) André Lotterer (Belgium) Laurens Vanthoor (Italy) Antonio Fuoco (Spain) Miguel Molina (Denmark) Nicklas Nielsen (1)
- Most wins (team): (United States) Porsche Penske Motorsport (Italy) Ferrari AF Corse (1)
- Most wins (manufacturer): (Germany) Porsche (Italy) Ferrari (1)

The Qatar 1812 km, also known as the Qatar Airways Qatar 1812 km for sponsorship reasons, is a sports car race held at the Lusail International Circuit in Lusail, Qatar. It was first held in 2024, as the opening round of the FIA World Endurance Championship season. The race is either 1812 km long or 10 hours, whichever comes first.

== History ==
On 12 December 2022, it was announced that Lusail International Circuit would host the opening round of the FIA World Endurance Championship from 2024 under a 6-year contract. The race was announced as the 6 Hours of Qatar and was preceded by the Prologue, also set to take place at the circuit.

At an Automobile Club de l'Ouest press conference ahead of the 2023 24 Hours of Le Mans, the race name was changed to Qatar 1812 km. The race length of 1812 km is derived from the date of Qatar National Day, 18 December, and it has a time limit of 10 hours.

On 3 March 2026, the 2026 Qatar 1812 km was officially postponed due to the 2026 Iran war. A revised date during the second half of the 2026 FIA World Endurance Championship season was to be confirmed. The 2026 event was eventually cancelled.

== Results ==
Year	Overall winner(s)	Entrant	Car	Time	Laps	Distance/Duration	Championship	Report
2024	(France) Kévin Estre (Germany) André Lotterer (Belgium) Laurens Vanthoor	(Germany) Porsche Penske Motorsport	Porsche 963	9:55:51.926	335	1,814.75 km	FIA World Endurance Championship	Report
2025	(Italy) Antonio Fuoco (Spain) Miguel Molina (Denmark) Nicklas Nielsen	(Italy) Ferrari AF Corse	Ferrari 499P	10:01:39.098	318	1,722.64 km	FIA World Endurance Championship	Report
