= 8 Hours of Bahrain =

Sports car race

(Bahrain) 8 Hours of Bahrain بطولة ثماني ساعات في البحرين (Arabic)

FIA WEC
- Venue: Bahrain International Circuit
- Corporate sponsor: Bapco
- First race: 2012
- First WEC race: 2012
- Duration: 8 hours
- Previous names: 6 Hours of Bahrain
- Most wins (driver): (United Kingdom) Mike Conway (6)
- Most wins (team): (Japan) Toyota Gazoo Racing (9)
- Most wins (manufacturer): (Japan) Toyota (11)

The 8 Hours of Bahrain (previously 6 Hours of Bahrain) (بطولة ست ساعات في البحرين) is a sports car race that is held at the Bahrain International Circuit in Sakhir, Bahrain. It was created for the FIA World Endurance Championship, and was held for the first time on 29 September 2012 as the sixth round of the 2012 World Endurance Championship. The creation of the race led to controversy, as the date for the inaugural race clashed with the 2012 Petit Le Mans.

== 2021 Double-header ==
On 7 July 2021, the ACO announced that the fifth round of the 2021 FIA World Endurance Championship in Fuji had been cancelled due to the travel restrictions related to the ongoing COVID-19 pandemic and replaced by an additional 6-hour race in Bahrain on 30 October. The original 8 hour race would also be brought forward from 20 to 6 November, creating the first double-header in the championship's history.

== Results ==
| Year | Overall winner(s) | Entrant | Car | Race Duration | Race Distance | Championship | Report | Ref |
6 hour format
| 2012 | (France) Benoît Tréluyer (Germany) André Lotterer (Switzerland) Marcel Fässler | (Germany) Audi Sport Team Joest | Audi R18 e-tron quattro | 6:00:56 | 1,033.69 km (642.31 mi) | FIA World Endurance Championship | Report | |
| 2013 | (France) Stéphane Sarrazin (Switzerland) Sébastien Buemi (United Kingdom) Anthony Davidson | (Japan) Toyota Racing | Toyota TS030 Hybrid | 6:01:15 | 1,076.98 km (669.20 mi) | FIA World Endurance Championship | Report | |
| 2014 | (Austria) Alexander Wurz (France) Stéphane Sarrazin (United Kingdom) Mike Conway | (Japan) Toyota Racing | Toyota TS040 Hybrid | 6:00:18 | 1,055.34 km (655.76 mi) | FIA World Endurance Championship | Report | |
| 2015 | (France) Romain Dumas (Germany) Marc Lieb (Switzerland) Neel Jani | (Germany) Porsche Team | Porsche 919 Hybrid | 6:00:52 | 1,076.98 km (669.20 mi) | FIA World Endurance Championship | Report | |
| 2016 | (Brazil) Lucas di Grassi (France) Loïc Duval (United Kingdom) Oliver Jarvis | (Germany) Audi Sport Team Joest | Audi R18 e-tron quattro | 6:00:12 | 1,052.86 km (654.22 mi) | FIA World Endurance Championship | Report | |
| 2017 | (United Kingdom) Anthony Davidson (Switzerland) Sébastien Buemi (Japan) Kazuki Nakajima | (Japan) Toyota Gazoo Racing | Toyota TS050 Hybrid | 6:01:26 | 1,047.03 km (650.59 mi) | FIA World Endurance Championship | Report | |
| 2021 | (United Kingdom) Mike Conway (Japan) Kamui Kobayashi (Argentina) José María López | (Japan) Toyota Gazoo Racing | Toyota GR010 Hybrid | 6:00:33 | 1,000.96 km (621.97 mi) | FIA World Endurance Championship | Report | |
8 hour format
| 2019 | (United Kingdom) Mike Conway (Japan) Kamui Kobayashi (Argentina) José María López | (Japan) Toyota Gazoo Racing | Toyota TS050 Hybrid | 8:01:24 | 1,390.62 km (864.09 mi) | FIA World Endurance Championship | Report | |
| 2020 | (United Kingdom) Mike Conway (Japan) Kamui Kobayashi (Argentina) José María López | (Japan) Toyota Gazoo Racing | Toyota TS050 Hybrid | 8:00:13 | 1,423.09 km (884.27 mi) | FIA World Endurance Championship | Report | |
| 2021 | (Switzerland) Sébastien Buemi (New Zealand) Brendon Hartley (Japan) Kazuki Nakajima | (Japan) Toyota Gazoo Racing | Toyota GR010 Hybrid | 8:01:25 | 1,336.50 km (830.46 mi) | FIA World Endurance Championship | Report | |
| 2022 | (United Kingdom) Mike Conway (Japan) Kamui Kobayashi (Argentina) José María López | (Japan) Toyota Gazoo Racing | Toyota GR010 Hybrid | 8:00:40 | 1,325.69 km (823.75 mi) | FIA World Endurance Championship | Report | |
| 2023 | (Switzerland) Sébastien Buemi (New Zealand) Brendon Hartley (Japan) Ryo Hirakawa | (Japan) Toyota Gazoo Racing | Toyota GR010 Hybrid | 8:01:25 | 1,347.34 km (837.20 mi) | FIA World Endurance Championship | Report | |
| 2024 | (Switzerland) Sébastien Buemi (New Zealand) Brendon Hartley (Japan) Ryo Hirakawa | (Japan) Toyota Gazoo Racing | Toyota GR010 Hybrid | 8:01:25 | 1,271.57 km (790.12 mi) | FIA World Endurance Championship | Report | |
| 2025 | (United Kingdom) Mike Conway (Japan) Kamui Kobayashi (Netherlands) Nyck de Vries | (Japan) Toyota Gazoo Racing | Toyota GR010 Hybrid | 8:01:08 | 1,282.64 km (797.00 mi) | FIA World Endurance Championship | Report | |

== Statistics ==
=== Wins by manufacturer ===
| Rank | Constructor | Wins | Years |
|---|---|---|---|
| 1 | (Japan) Toyota | 11 | 2013, 2014, 2017, 2019–2025 (Note: Two races were held in Bahrain as part of the 2021 season finale. Toyota won both of them.) |
| 2 | (Germany) Audi | 2 | 2012, 2016 |
| 3 | (Germany) Porsche | 1 | 2015 |
