= 6 Hours of São Paulo =

Endurance sports car event

FIA World Endurance Championship
- Venue: Autódromo José Carlos Pace
- Corporate sponsor: Rolex (2024)
- First race: 2012
- Last race: 2026
- Duration: 6 hours
- Most wins (driver): 17 drivers tied (1)
- Most wins (team): (Japan) Toyota Gazoo Racing (2)
- Most wins (manufacturer): (Japan) Toyota (2)

The 6 Hours of São Paulo is a sports car race held at the Autódromo José Carlos Pace in São Paulo, Brazil. It was created for the FIA World Endurance Championship, and was held for the first time on 15 September 2012 as the fifth round of the 2012 World Endurance Championship. The race was discontinued for 2015 as the Interlagos paddock buildings were undergoing renovations and a suitable date could not be secured. The race was originally set to return in 2020 as the 5th round of the 2019-20 FIA World Endurance Championship, but was subsequently cancelled, due to the event promoter failing to meet contractual obligations, and it was replaced by a round at the Circuit of the Americas.

On 9 June 2023, the schedule for the 2024 FIA World Endurance Championship was announced, with São Paulo returning to the schedule on 14 July as the fifth race of the season after signing a contract until the 2028 season.

== Results ==
Year	Overall winner(s)	Entrant	Car	Race title	Championship	Report	Ref
2012	(Austria) Alexander Wurz (France) Nicolas Lapierre	(Japan) Toyota Racing	Toyota TS030 Hybrid	6 Hours of São Paulo	FIA World Endurance Championship	Report	
2013	(Germany) André Lotterer (Switzerland) Marcel Fässler (France) Benoît Tréluyer	(Germany) Audi Sport Team Joest	Audi R18 e-tron quattro	6 Hours of São Paulo	FIA World Endurance Championship	Report	
2014	(Germany) Marc Lieb (Switzerland) Neel Jani (France) Romain Dumas	(Germany) Porsche Team	Porsche 919 Hybrid	6 Hours of São Paulo	FIA World Endurance Championship	Report	
2015–2023: Not held
2024	(Switzerland) Sébastien Buemi (New Zealand) Brendon Hartley (Japan) Ryō Hirakawa	(Japan) Toyota Gazoo Racing	Toyota GR010 Hybrid	Rolex 6 Hours of São Paulo	FIA World Endurance Championship	Report	
2025	(United Kingdom) Alex Lynn (France) Norman Nato (United Kingdom) Will Stevens	(United States) Cadillac Hertz Team Jota	Cadillac V-Series.R	Rolex 6 Hours of São Paulo	FIA World Endurance Championship	Report	
2026	(Denmark) Kevin Magnussen (Switzerland) Raffaele Marciello (Belgium) Dries Vanthoor	(Germany) BMW M Team WRT	BMW M Hybrid V8	Rolex 6 Hours of São Paulo	FIA World Endurance Championship	Report	
