= List of fellows of the Royal Society at Trinity College Dublin =

Fellows of the Royal Society affiliated with Trinity College Dublin are scholars and scientists connected with Trinity College Dublin (TCD) who have been elected as Fellows of the Royal Society (FRS). The Royal Society, founded in 1660, is the world's oldest independent scientific academy. Election as an FRS recognises exceptional contributions to science, mathematics, and engineering. This page lists those fellows who were elected before or during their tenure at TCD, associating them with schools and disciplines which are today under the umbrella of the Faculty of Science, Technology, Engineering and Mathematics.

== Fellows ==
Year of election	Fellow	Subject	TCD Affiliation	Refs
1716	Henry Nicholson	Botany	First Professor of Botany (1711-1715)	
1718	William Stephens	Botany and Chemistry	Lecturer in Botany (1724/25 - 1733); Lecturer in Chemistry (1733 - 1761)	
1761	Hugh Hamilton	Physics	Erasmus Smith's Professor of Natural and Experimental Philosophy (1759 -1769)	
1834	John Phillips	Geology	Professor of Geology (1844 - 1853)	
1836	Humphrey Lloyd	Physics	Erasmus Smith Professor of Natural and Experimental Philosophy (1831 - 1843); Provost (appointed 1867)	
1838	John Benjamin Macneill	Engineering	First Professor of the Practice of Engineering (1842 - 1852)	
1843	James MacCullagh	Physics and Mathematics	Erasmus Smith's Professor of Mathematics (1835–1843); Erasmus Smith's Professor of Natural and Experimental Philosophy (1843–1847)	
1848	Thomas Oldham	Geology	Professor of Geology (1845 - 1850)	
1853	James Apjohn	Chemistry and Geology	Lecturer on Applied Chemistry (1841 - 1851); Professor of Chemistry (appointed 1851); Professor of Mineralogy (appointed 1855)	
1854	George James Allman	Botany	Professor of Botany (1844-1856)	
1858	William Henry Harvey	Botany	Professor of Botany (1856–1866)	
1858	Samuel Haughton	Geology	Professor of Geology (1851 - 1881)	
1863	George Salmon	Mathematics	Provost (1888–1904); Donegall Lecturer in Mathematics (1858 - 1867); Regius Professor of Divinity at TCD (1866-1888)	
1873	Robert Stawall Ball	Mathematics and Physics	Royal Astronomer of Ireland and Andrews Professor of Astronomy (1874–1892)	
1880	James Emerson Reynolds	Chemistry	Professor of Chemistry (1875–1903)	
1881	Alexander Macalister	Zoology and Anatomy	Lecturer, Professor of Zoology (1869 - 1872); Professor of Comparative Anatomy (1872 -1877); Professor of Anatomy and Chirurgery (1877 - 1879); Professor of Anatomy (1879 - 1883)	
1882	Valentine Ball	Geology	Professor of Geology and Mineralogy (1881 - 1883)	
1883	George Francis Fitzgerald	Physics	Erasmus Smith Professor of Natural and Experimental Philosophy (1881 - 1901)	
1889	William Johnston Sollas	Geology	Professor of Geology and Mineralogy (1881–1897)	
1892	John Joly	Geology and Physics	Professor of Geology and Mineralogy (1897 - 1933)	
1893	Sydney Young	Chemistry	Professor of Chemistry (appointed in 1904)	
1897	Frederick Thomas Trouton	Physics	Assistant to G.F. Fitzgerald (1885–1901)	
1904	Charles Jasper Joly	Mathematics	Andrews Professor of Astronomy and Royal Astronomer of Ireland (1897–1906)	
1905	E.T. Whittaker	Mathematics	Andrews Professor of Astronomy and Royal Astronomer of Ireland from (1906-1912)	
1908	Henry Horatio Dixon	Botany	Professor of Botany (1904–1949)	
1961	Robert George Spencer Hudson	Geology	Professor of Geology and Mineralogy (appointed in 1961)	
1973	George Francis Mitchell	Geology	Lecturer in Geology (appointed in 1940); Professor of Quaternary Studies (appointed in 1959)	
1976	Daniel Joseph Bradley	Physics	Professor of Optical Electronics (1980 - 1984)	
1999	Denis Lawrence Weaire	Physics	Erasmus Smith's Professor of Natural and Experimental Philosophy (1984 - 2007)	
1999	John Bernard Pethica	Physics	Science Foundation Ireland Stokes Professor of Physics (2012 - 2018)	
2003	John Michael David Coey	Physics	Professor of Experimental Physics (1987-2007); Erasmus Smith's Professor of Natural and Experimental Philosophy (2007 - 2012)	
2016	Luke O'Neill	Biochemistry and Immunology	Professor of Molecular Immunology (2004-2007); Professor of Biochemistry (2007–present)	
2024	Dan Bradley	Genetics and Microbiology	Professor of Population Genetics (2008–present)	
2025	Jennifer McElwain	Botany	1711 Professor of Botany (2017-present); Director of Trinity College Botanic Garden	
2025	Jonathan N. Coleman	Physics	Professor of Chemical Physics (2011 - 2022); Erasmus Smith's Professor of Natural and Experimental Philosophy (2022–present)	
