= Formula Chrysler Euroseries =

Car racing series

- Category: Single seaters
- Country: Europe
- Inaugural season: 2001
- Folded: 2001
- Drivers: 15
- Teams: 8
- Constructors: Reynard
- Engine suppliers: Chrysler
- Last Drivers' champion: (Netherlands) Ricardo van der Ende
- Last Teams' champion: (Switzerland) Alpie Motorsport

The Formula Chrysler Euroseries was a single-make open-wheel racing series based in Europe. It ran only in 2001.

== History ==
Launched as the International Single Seater Challenge the series had to fill the gap between national Formula Three championship and the Formula 3000 series. The car was first tested by Guy Smith in November 2000 at Donington Park. The initial season started with a promotional event at Circuit Park Zandvoort. Eight drivers were present at the event. However, the race was stopped early as there were only two cars running after eight laps. Anthony Kumpen won the race, he finished in front of Aldo Piedade Jr. The official season started on August 25 at the Österreichring in Austria. Six drivers started the first race with Charles Hall winning. The biggest grid was at the Nürburgring where ten cars made an appearance. Ricardo van der Ende dominated the season claiming four wins and six podium finishes out of seven races.

A calendar was announced for the 2002 season. The season would consist of thirteen races at ten different European circuits. According to the official website the season opener was pushed back by three months because of the bankruptcy of car supplier Reynard Motorsport. The number of rounds was also reduced to five double headers.

=== Revival ===
The Reynard chassis were bought by Dutch entrepreneur Harry Maessen in 2006. The idea was to increase performance and form a racing series in 2008. In 2008 the renewed cars, renamed Formula BRL ran a test session at Circuit Zolder. Various Dutch drivers tested the car fitted with a 420 hp Ford V8 engine. Later in the season the cars ran two demonstration races at the TT Circuit Assen. Former champion Ricardo van der Ende participated in the event. The races were won by Henk Vuik, Jr. and Nelson van der Pol. At the end of the 2008 season the idea for a racing series was scrapped.

== Scoring system ==
- Below is the scoring system used for the series during its 2001 season:

Position	1st	2nd	3rd	4th	5th	6th	7th	8th	9th	10th	Pole	Fastest Lap
Points	20	15	12	10	8	6	4	3	2	1	2	2

== Champions ==
Season	Champion	Second	Third	Team Champion
2001	(Netherlands) Ricardo van der Ende (Vortex Motorsport)	(Mexico) Roberto González	(Germany) Sven Heidfeld	(Switzerland) Alpie Motorsport

== See also ==
- Auto GP
- International Formula Master
