= William Stephens =

William or Bill Stephens may refer to:

== Arts and entertainment ==
- William Humphries Stephens (1739–c. 1820) English sculptor
- William Stephens (producer) (1897–1962), American film producer
- Bill Stephens (born 1949), American TV host

== Law and politics ==
- William Stephens (fl. 1650s), member of parliament for Newport (Isle of Wight) 1645 and 1659–60
- Sir William Stephens (d. 1697) (c. 1641–1697), member of parliament for Newport (Isle of Wight) 1685–87 and 1689–95
- William Stephens (colonial administrator) (1671–1753), governor of the province of Georgia, 1743–1751; MP for Newport (Isle of Wight) 1702–1722, for Newtown (Isle of Wight) 1722–1727
- William Stephens (judge) (1752–1819), U.S. federal judge
- William Stephens (Australian politician), (1857–1925), Australian politician
- William Stephens (American politician) (1859–1944), American politician

== Others ==
- William Stephens (minister) (1647–1718), Anglican priest
- William Stephens (botanist) (1696–1761), Irish physician and botanist
- William Stephens (glassmaker) (1731–1803), English merchant and glass manufacturer in Portugal
- William Stephens (academic) (1829–1890), English-born headmaster at Sydney Grammar School and professor at the University of Sydney
- William Stephens (dean of Winchester), (1839–1902), Anglican priest
- William Stephens (cricketer) (1870–1954), New Zealand cricketer
- William Ward Stephens (1922–1987), American Thoroughbred horse racing trainer
- William E. Stephens, inventor of time-of-flight mass spectrometry in 1946
- William O. Stephens, American professor of philosophy

== See also ==
- William Stevens (disambiguation)
- Willis Stephens (born 1955), New York State Assembly politician
- William Stephen (disambiguation)
