= William Stevens =

William, Will, Bill, or Billy Stevens may refer to:

== Law and politics ==
- William C. Stevens (Michigan politician) (1837–1921), American politician in Michigan
- William Burnham Stevens (1843–1931), American jurist and politician in Massachusetts
- William C. Stevens (New York politician) (1848–1897), American politician from New York
- William N. Stevens (1850–1889), African American politician in Virginia General Assembly
- William A. Stevens (1879–1941), American jurist and politician in New Jersey
- William S. Stevens (1948–2008), American attorney

== Religion ==
- William Stevens (writer) (1732–1807), English religious writer
- William Bacon Stevens (1815–1887), American Episcopal bishop
- William L. Stevens (1932–1997), American Episcopal bishop

== Sports ==
- Billy Stevens (Australian footballer) (1905–1997), Australian rules footballer for St Kilda
- Bill Stevens (footballer, born 1908) (1908–1981), Australian rules footballer for North Melbourne
- Bill Stevens (footballer, born 1939), Australian rules footballer for Fitzroy
- Billy Stevens (born 1945), American football player
- Will Stevens (born 1991), British racing driver

== Others ==
- William H. Stevens (1818–1880), American architect
- William Oliver Stevens (1878–1955), American writer and Naval Academy professor
- Will Henry Stevens (1881–1949), American modernist painter and naturalist
- William George Stevens (1893–1975), British-born New Zealand military general
- W. Richard Stevens (1951–1999), American technology writer

== See also ==
- William Stephens (disambiguation)
