= 2001 Formula Chrysler Euroseries =

The 2001 Formula Chrysler Euroseries season was the inaugural and only Formula Chrysler Euroseries season. It featured seven races at four European racing circuits during the latter half of 2001. Dutchman Ricardo van der Ende was crowned champion of the series, taking four wins in all and beating Mexican Roberto González to the title.

== Teams and drivers ==
| Team | No. | Drivers | Rounds |
|---|---|---|---|
| (Mexico) DJS Motorsport | 1 | (Brazil) Aldo Piedade, Jr. | All |
| (Mexico) DJS Motorsport | 10 | (Mexico) Francisco Acebras | All |
| (Mexico) DJS Motorsport | 11 | (France) Julien Vidot | 4 |
| (Switzerland) Alpie Motorsport | 2 | (Mexico) Roberto González | All |
| (Switzerland) Alpie Motorsport | 3 | (Mexico) Ricardo González | All |
| (Belgium) Vortex Motorsport | 4 | (Netherlands) Ron van Toren | 1–3 |
| (Belgium) Vortex Motorsport | 5 | (Netherlands) Ricardo van der Ende | All |
| (Belgium) Vortex Motorsport | 6 | (United Kingdom) Charles Hall | 1 |
| (Belgium) Vortex Motorsport | 12 | (Netherlands) Allard Kalff | 4 |
| (Belgium) Vortex Motorsport | 17 | (Netherlands) Robert van den Berg | 4 |
| (Germany) Böhm Motorsport | 7 | (Germany) Marko Stipp | 1–2 |
| (Italy) Target Racing | 7 | (Germany) Marko Stipp | 3–4 |
| (Italy) Target Racing | 8 | (Germany) Sven Heidfeld | 1–3 |
| (Belgium) Johns Racing | 9 | (Belgium) John Svensson | 2–3 |
| (Denmark) Nagler Racing | 14 | (Denmark) Michael Nagler | 2 |
| (United Kingdom) Paul Owens Racing | 15 | (United Kingdom) Mark Owens | 3–4 |

== Race calendar and results ==
| Round | | Circuit | Country | Date | Pole position | Fastest lap | Winning driver | Winning team |
|---|---|---|---|---|---|---|---|---|
| 1 | R1 | (Austria) A1-Ring | Austria | August 25 | (Germany) Sven Heidfeld | (Mexico) Ricardo González | (United Kingdom) Charles Hall | (Belgium) Vortex Motorsport |
| 1 | R2 | (Austria) A1-Ring | Austria | August 26 | (Mexico) Ricardo González | (Netherlands) Ricardo van der Ende | (Mexico) Roberto González | (Switzerland) Alpie Motorsport |
| 2 | R | (Germany) Nürburgring | Germany | September 9 | (Germany) Sven Heidfeld | (Belgium) John Svensson | (Netherlands) Ricardo van der Ende | (Belgium) Vortex Motorsport |
| 3 | R1 | (Spain) Circuito Permanente del Jarama | Spain | September 30 | (Mexico) Roberto González | (Germany) Sven Heidfeld | (Mexico) Roberto González | (Switzerland) Alpie Motorsport |
| 3 | R2 | (Spain) Circuito Permanente del Jarama | Spain | September 30 | (Netherlands) Ricardo van der Ende | (Netherlands) Ricardo van der Ende | (Netherlands) Ricardo van der Ende | (Belgium) Vortex Motorsport |
| 4 | R1 | (Portugal) Autódromo do Estoril | Portugal | October 20 | (Netherlands) Ricardo van der Ende | (Netherlands) Ricardo van der Ende | (Netherlands) Ricardo van der Ende | (Belgium) Vortex Motorsport |
| 4 | R2 | (Portugal) Autódromo do Estoril | Portugal | October 21 | (Netherlands) Ricardo van der Ende | (Netherlands) Ricardo van der Ende | (Netherlands) Ricardo van der Ende | (Belgium) Vortex Motorsport |

== Championship standings ==
=== Drivers ===
| Pos | Driver | A1R R1 (Austria) | A1R R2 (Austria) | NÜR R (Germany) | JAR R1 (Spain) | JAR R2 (Spain) | EST R1 (Portugal) | EST R2 (Portugal) | Points |
|---|---|---|---|---|---|---|---|---|---|
| 1 | (Netherlands) Ricardo van der Ende | Ret | 3 | 1 | 2 | **1** | **1** | **1** | 121 |
| 2 | (Mexico) Roberto González | 3 | 1 | 3 | **1** | 2 | 2 | 4 | 106 |
| 3 | (Germany) Sven Heidfeld | **4** | 2 | **4** | 3 | 3 | | | 65 |
| 4 | (Mexico) Ricardo González | 2 | **4** | 5 | Ret | 6 | 5 | 7 | 55 |
| 5 | (Brazil) Aldo Piedade, Jr. | DNS | Ret | 2 | Ret | Ret | 3 | 2 | 42 |
| 6 | (United Kingdom) Mark Owens | | | | 4 | 4 | 4 | 5 | 38 |
| 7 | (Mexico) Francisco Acebras | 5 | 6 | 7 | 5 | 7 | Ret | 6 | 36 |
| 8 | (United Kingdom) Charles Hall | 1 | Ret | | | | | | 20 |
| 9 | (Germany) Marko Stipp | DNS | Ret | Ret | 6 | 5 | 6 | Ret | 20 |
| 10 | (France) Julien Vidot | | | | | | 8 | 3 | 15 |
| 11 | (Netherlands) Ron van Toren | DNS | 5 | 6 | Ret | Ret | | | 14 |
| 12 | (Netherlands) Robert van den Berg | | | | | | 7 | Ret | 4 |
| 13 | (Denmark) Michael Nagler | | | 8 | | | | | 3 |
| 14 | (Belgium) John Svensson | | | Ret | Ret | Ret | | | 2 |
| 15 | (Netherlands) Allard Kalff | | | | | | Ret | Ret | 0 |
| Pos | Driver | A1R R1 (Austria) | A1R R2 (Austria) | NÜR R (Germany) | JAR R1 (Spain) | JAR R2 (Spain) | EST R1 (Portugal) | EST R2 (Portugal) | Points |

| Colour | Result |
|---|---|
| Gold | Winner |
| Silver | Second place |
| Bronze | Third place |
| Green | Points classification |
| Blue | Non-points classification |
| Blue | Non-classified finish (NC) |
| Purple | Retired, not classified (Ret) |
| Red | Did not qualify (DNQ) |
| Red | Did not pre-qualify (DNPQ) |
| Black | Disqualified (DSQ) |
| White | Did not start (DNS) |
| White | Withdrew (WD) |
| White | Race cancelled (C) |
| Blank | Did not practice (DNP) |
| Blank | Did not arrive (DNA) |
| Blank | Excluded (EX) |

**Bold** - Pole
Italics - Fastest Lap

=== Teams ===
| Pos | Driver | A1R R1 (Austria) | A1R R2 (Austria) | NÜR R (Germany) | JAR R1 (Spain) | JAR R2 (Spain) | EST R1 (Portugal) | EST R2 (Portugal) | Points |
|---|---|---|---|---|---|---|---|---|---|
| 1 | (Switzerland) Alpie Motorsport | 3 | 1 | 3 | **1** | 2 | 2 | 4 | 161 |
| 1 | (Switzerland) Alpie Motorsport | 2 | **4** | 5 | Ret | 6 | 5 | 7 | 161 |
| 2 | (Belgium) Vortex Motorsport | DNS | 5 | 6 | Ret | Ret | | | 159 |
| 2 | (Belgium) Vortex Motorsport | Ret | 3 | 1 | 2 | **1** | **1** | **1** | 159 |
| 2 | (Belgium) Vortex Motorsport | 1 | Ret | | | | | | 159 |
| 2 | (Belgium) Vortex Motorsport | | | | | | Ret | Ret | 159 |
| 2 | (Belgium) Vortex Motorsport | | | | | | 7 | Ret | 159 |
| 3 | (Mexico) DJS Motorsport | DNS | Ret | 2 | Ret | Ret | 3 | 2 | 93 |
| 3 | (Mexico) DJS Motorsport | 5 | 6 | 7 | 5 | 7 | Ret | 6 | 93 |
| 3 | (Mexico) DJS Motorsport | | | | | | 8 | 3 | 93 |
| 4 | (Italy) Target Racing | | | | 6 | 5 | 6 | Ret | 85 |
| 4 | (Italy) Target Racing | **4** | 2 | **4** | 3 | 3 | | | 85 |
| 5 | (United Kingdom) Paul Owens Racing | | | | 4 | 4 | 4 | 5 | 38 |
| 6 | (Denmark) Nagler Racing | | | 8 | | | | | 3 |
| 7 | (Belgium) Johns Racing | | | Ret | Ret | Ret | | | 2 |
| 8 | (Germany) Böhm Motorsport | DNS | Ret | Ret | | | | | 0 |
| Pos | Driver | A1R R1 (Austria) | A1R R2 (Austria) | NÜR R (Germany) | JAR R1 (Spain) | JAR R2 (Spain) | EST R1 (Portugal) | EST R2 (Portugal) | Points |

| Colour | Result |
|---|---|
| Gold | Winner |
| Silver | Second place |
| Bronze | Third place |
| Green | Points classification |
| Blue | Non-points classification |
| Blue | Non-classified finish (NC) |
| Purple | Retired, not classified (Ret) |
| Red | Did not qualify (DNQ) |
| Red | Did not pre-qualify (DNPQ) |
| Black | Disqualified (DSQ) |
| White | Did not start (DNS) |
| White | Withdrew (WD) |
| White | Race cancelled (C) |
| Blank | Did not practice (DNP) |
| Blank | Did not arrive (DNA) |
| Blank | Excluded (EX) |

**Bold** - Pole
Italics - Fastest Lap

| Position | 1st | 2nd | 3rd | 4th | 5th | 6th | 7th | 8th | 9th | 10th | Pole | Fastest Lap |
| Points | 20 | 15 | 12 | 10 | 8 | 6 | 4 | 3 | 2 | 1 | 2 | 2 |
