= Jota Sport =

British sports car racing team

(United Kingdom) JOTA
- Founded: 2000
- Founder(s): Sam Hignett, John Stack
- Base: Kent, UK
- Team principal(s): Sam Hignett (Partner & Team Principal), David Clark (Partner & Commercial Director)
- Current series: 24 Hours of Le Mans; FIA World Endurance Championship
- Former series: GT World Challenge Europe Endurance Cup; GT World Challenge Europe Sprint Cup; Asian Le Mans Series; WeatherTech SportsCar Championship; FIA Sportscar Championship; Porsche Carrera Cup Great Britain; Porsche Supercup; European Le Mans Series; 24 Hours Nürburgring; American Le Mans Series; British GT Championship
- Current drivers: (United Kingdom) Alex Lynn (France) Norman Nato (United Kingdom) Will Stevens (United Kingdom) Jack Aitken (France) Sebastien Bourdais (New Zealand) Earl Bamber
- Teams' Championships: 4; 2024 (Hypercar); 2023 (Hypercar); 2022 (LMP2); 2016 (LMP2, ELMS)
- Drivers' Championships: 2; 2022 (LMP2); 2016 (LMP2, ELMS)
- Website: www.jotagroup.com

Jota Sport is a British sports car racing team. Founded as Team Jota by Sam Hignett and John Stack, Jota Sport is part of the Jota Group which is owned by Sam Hignett and David Clark. The team is based in Tunbridge Wells in England. Jota Sport has finished on the overall podium of 2017 24 Hours of Le Mans with two Oreca in an alliance with Jackie Chan DC Racing. In 2018/2019 Jota competed, in partnership with Arden International, RP Motorsport, Jackie Chan DC Racing and Aston Martin in the FIA World Endurance Championship with two ORECA 07 LMP2 and in the GT World Challenge Europe with Mclaren 720S GT3 cars. In 2025, Jota announced a partnership with Cadillac Racing to run two Cadillac V-Series.R cars in the FIA World Endurance Championship, including the 24 Hours of Le Mans, from 2025 onwards.

== History ==
Started in 2000 by Sam Hignett, then a university student in materials engineering, and racing driver John Stack, Team Jota's first car was a Honda Integra built specifically for endurance racing. That year the team competed at 24 Hours Nürburgring and Spa 24 Hours. The following year, the team raced in the Renault Clio V6 Trophy as well as taking the Honda Integra to 24 Hours Nürburgring for a second year. In 2002, they bought an SR2 class Pilbeam to compete in the FIA Sportscar Championship, finishing second overall in the SR2 championship; their second year with the Pilbeam saw them finish third.

=== 2004 ===
In 2004, Team Jota purchased Zytek’s very first car (Zytek 04S), starting a relationship with the engineering company that still exists today. Gianni Collini joined Hignett and Stack to drive the Zytek in the Le Mans Endurance Series where they finished 6th overall in the championship.

=== 2005 ===
Team Jota competed in the Le Mans Endurance Series again in 2005 with the Zytek 04S, achieving another sixth overall result in the championship. This was the first year they also competed at Le Mans 24 Hours where they didn't finish due to an accident on track, but held fifth place up until hour 22. In addition to Hignett and Stack, Haruki Kurosawa, Gregor Fisken, Sam Hancock and Jason Tahincioglu drove for the team during the season.

=== 2006 ===
During 2006, Team Jota ran the Zytek factory team in the newly named Le Mans Series, the Le Mans 24 Hours and the final two rounds of the American Le Mans Series which included Petit Le Mans and Mazda Raceway Laguna Seca. The final result for the Le Mans Series was fifth overall. The team finished 24th overall at Le Mans 24 Hours and fifth in their class. Petit Le Mans saw a second place overall for the factory team with a seventh place overall at Mazda Raceway Laguna Seca, with the car driven by Stefan Johansson and Johnny Mowlem.

=== 2007 ===
In 2007, the team ran a Lola-Judd LMP1 for Charouz Racing Systems which was Charouz's first venture into endurance racing. The team finished fifth in the series with drivers Jan Charouz and Stefan Mücke, and fifth in class, eighth overall in the Le Mans 24 Hours with Alex Young joining the team. Team Jota again competed in the final two rounds of the American Le Mans Series for Zytek, finishing fourth overall and third in the LMP2 class at Petit Le Mans with drivers Danny Watts, Stefan Mücke and Jan Charouz.

=== 2008 ===
This year saw the introduction of the Jota Sport brand in partnership with Simon Dolan and Sam Hancock, with the team competing in the Porsche Carrera Cup GB. Hancock drove for the team along with Phil Quaife and between them they achieved five pole positions and three race wins earning them a second-place finish in the championship. Team Jota continued with sportscar racing and ran the Corsa Motorsports LMP1 Zytek in the American Le Mans Series as well as the ex-Charouz Lola-Judd at the Le Mans 24 Hours with CytoSport (Muscle Milk). The car driven by Greg Pickett, Klaus Graf and Jan Lammers was a non finisher due to engine failure. Simon Dolan had his racing debut and first race win in April of this year at Snetterton in a Radical.

=== 2009 ===
The brand Team Jota was retired in 2009 and Jota Sport ran the newly developed Ligier JS49 prototype in the European V de V Sports Championship, Challenge Endurance Proto and the UK Speed Series. Hancock and Dolan drove the car this season achieving third overall in the UK Speed Series and 24th overall in the V de V Championship. The team also ran a Juno SSE in the V de V Championship which was driven by Ollie Hancock and Chris Cappuccini who finished 16th in the championship. Johansson and Mowlem drove the Corsa Motorsports LMP1 Zytek in the American Le Mans Series again this year, their best result was a third place at Lime Rock.

=== 2010 ===
The team ran the Ligier JS49 for a second year in the European V de V Championship and the UK Speed Series, taking three first places over the season across both championships. This year saw the team become an Official Partner Team to Aston Martin Racing competing with a GT4 Aston Martin in the Spa 24 Hours and Britcar Silverstone 24 Hours where they took a first in class and second in class respectively. Mazda UK also commissioned Jota to run their MX-5 sports cars to celebrate the car's 21st anniversary. The cars were driven by six journalists at endurance races at Snetterton and Silverstone.

=== 2011 ===
With Aston Martin, the team competed in the Le Mans Series with a V8 Vantage GT2 car in the GTE Pro class. Dolan and Hancock were joined by Chris Buncombe for the 6 hours of Silverstone and again when the team took part in the 2011 Le Mans 24 Hours. The team's highest placing during the Le Mans Series Championship was fifth in class at Spa-Francorchamps and Estoril, with a DNF at Le Mans 24 Hours. Jota Sport was commissioned by Mazda to create a GT4 version of the MX-5 to compete in the Britcar Dunlop Production GTN Championship. The result for the season was seventh overall with Mark Ticehurst and Owen Mildenhall driving.

The team placed an order for 2 Aston Martin AMR-One cars from Prodrive but never received them, as the project was cancelled.

=== 2012 ===
Jota returned to the European Le Mans Series with the LMP2 Zytek Z11SN Nissan and also competed at the Le Mans 24 Hours and the Spa-Francorchamps round of the FIA World Endurance Championship. The team achieved a class win at Spa but failed to finish the Le Mans 24 hours after retiring nearly 20 hours in. Jota ran the Mazda MX-5 GT4 in the British GT Championship in 2012, again with Ticehurst and Mildenhall driving with the best result of the season a third in class at Brands Hatch.

=== 2013 ===
The team continued in the European Le Mans Series with the LMP2 Zytek Z11SN Nissan with a class win at Silverstone and finishing third overall in the championship. In the Le Mans 24 Hours they finished seventh in class with the Zytek, which was thirteenth overall.

=== 2014 ===
Jota Sport's third consecutive year running the LMP2 Zytek Z11SN Nissan saw a class win and fifth overall at the Le Mans 24 Hours, and a first, second and third in the European Le Mans Series which secured them second place in class in the championship. They were also commissioned by Mazda Motor Corporation to design, build and run a V4 category MX-5 for the Nurburgring 24 hours. Driven by Teruaki Kato, Stefan Johansson, Mildenhall and Wolfgang Kaufmann the car did not finish due to accident damage.

=== 2015 ===
For the 2015 season, the Zytek car had a change of name and model; the new car was a Nissan Nismo powered Gibson 015S LMP2 class, which again competed in the European Le Mans Series. Jota Sport ended the year with a third place in the European Le Mans Series, achieving a first, second and two third places during the Championship, as well as a first in class, ninth overall at the FIA World Endurance Championship race at Spa-Francorchamps. The Le Mans 24 Hours saw the team finish second in class and tenth overall.

=== 2016 ===
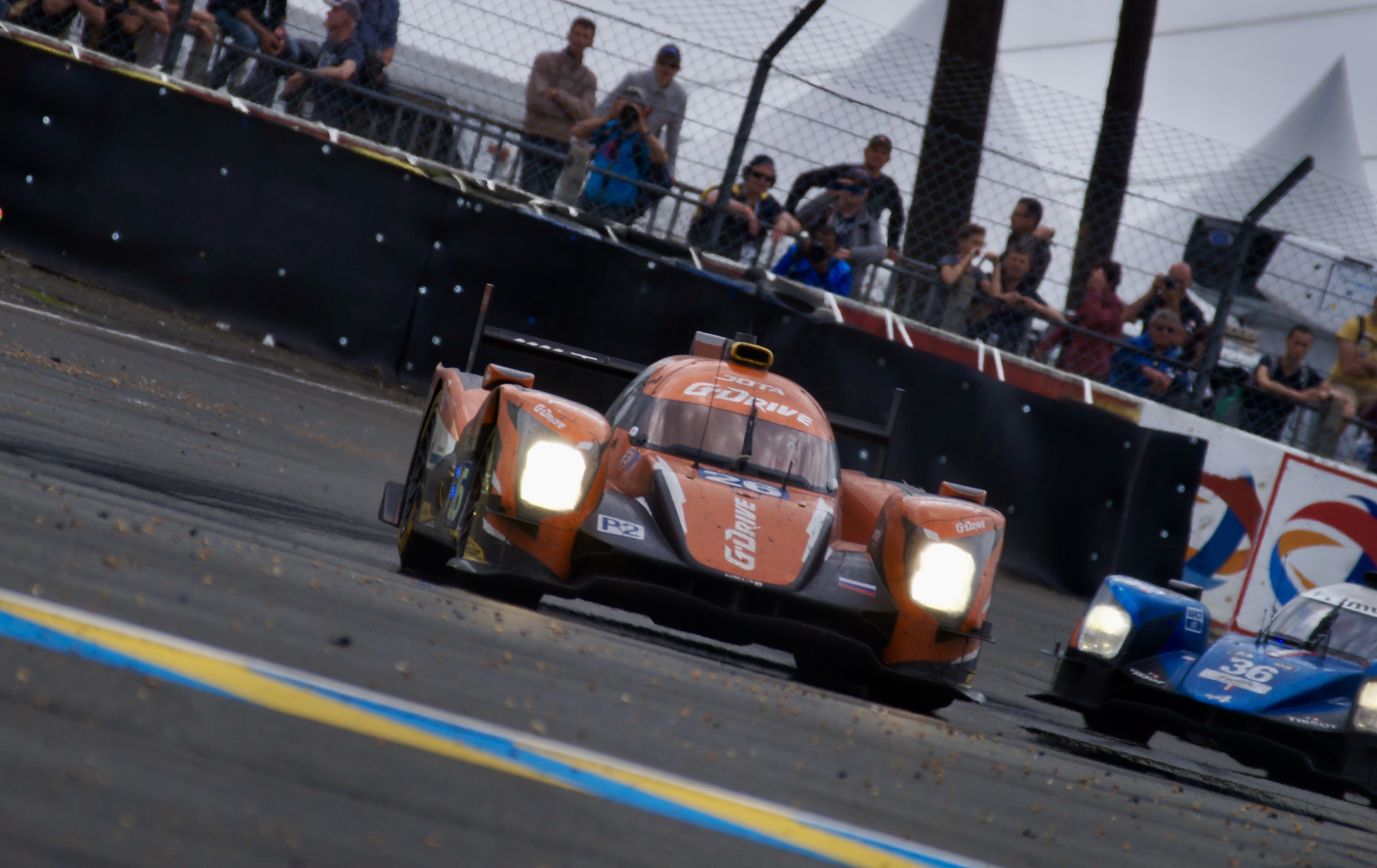
An Oreca 05 operated by Jota under the G-Drive Racing banner at the 2016 24 Hours of Le Mans

At the beginning of the 2016 season, JOTA Sport announced a landmark sponsorship deal with Russian energy company, Gazprom. As part of the sponsorship, Gazprom obtained the naming rights for JOTA Sport, so they competed as G-Drive Racing during the 2016 FIA WEC and European Le Mans Series.

In the 2016 European Le Mans Series, JOTA Sport raced a Gibson 015S, whilst in the 2016 FIA WEC, the team competed in an Oreca 05. The ELMS car was raced by Simon Dolan, Giedo van der Garde and Harry Tincknell. For Rounds 2 and 3 of the FIA WEC season, the 6 Hours of Spa-Francorchamps and 24 Hours of Le Mans respectively, Jake Dennis replaced Tincknell. Roman Rusinov, Nathanael Berthon and Rene Rast were announced as the driver line up for the 2016 FIA WEC season. In June 2016, JOTA Sport announced that the team had parted company with Berthon. Will Stevens replaced Berthon for Round 3 of the 2016 FIA WEC Championship, the 24 Hours of Le Mans.

In June 2016, JOTA Sport announced that Alex Brundle, son of former Formula One driver Martin Brundle, had replaced Berthon as part of the WEC driver line-up, alongside Rusinov and Rast.

=== 2017 ===
In 2017, Jota Sport joined forces with Jackie Chan DC Racing to run two Oreca 07 LMP2 cars in the 2017 FIA World Endurance Championship. Car 37 was driven by Jackie Chan DC Racing founder, David Cheng, ELMS LMP3 2016 champion, Alex Brundle and Frenchman Tristan Gommendy. Car 38 was driven by Ho-Pin Tung, Oliver Jarvis and Thomas Laurent.

=== 2018/2019 ===
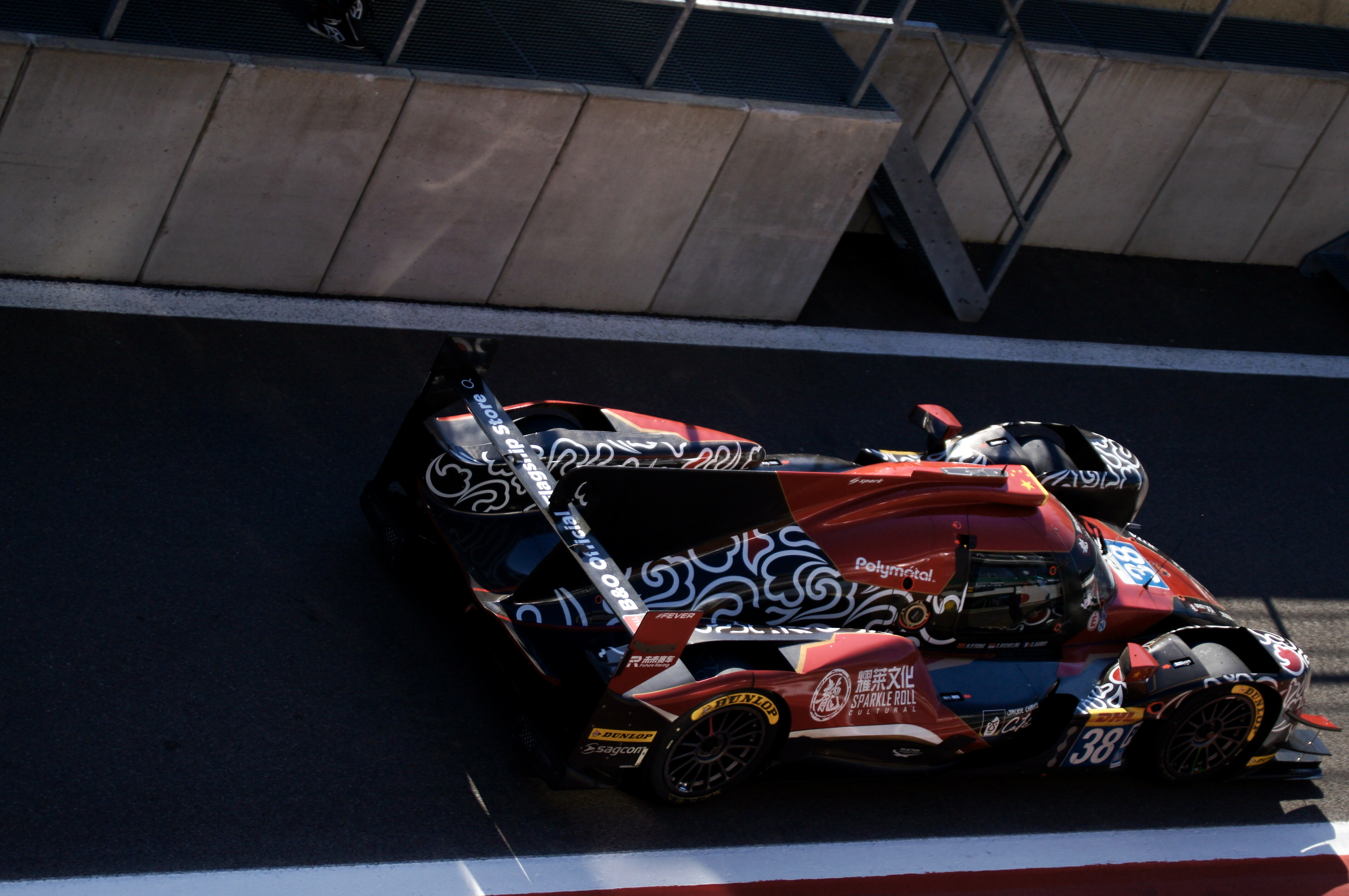
The #38 Jackie Chan DC Racing Oreca 07 at the 2018 6 Hours of Spa

2018 saw a second year partnering with Jackie Chan DC Racing for a larger than normal race calendar of the FIA World Endurance Championship. Again running two Oreca 07 LMP2 cars with Gibson Technology 4.2 V8 engines. Car 37 was driven by David Heinemeier Hansson, Will Stevens and Jordan King. Car 38 was driven by Ho-Pin Tung, Stephane Richelmi and Gabriel Aubry. The WEC calendar covered 13 months to move the championship to a winter schedule with car 38 finishing second in the championship and car 37 taking third. Car 37 took 8th place overall at Le Mans 24 Hours 2018 but failed to finish in the 2019 event due to a gear box problem. Car 38 claimed 10th place in Le Mans in 2018 and 7th in 2019.

=== 2019/2020 ===
Jota again raced the two Oreca 07 LMP2 cars with Gibson Technology 4.2 V8 engines in a second winter schedule FIA World Endurance Championship covering 15 months but Covid disruption meant no racing between February and August 2020. Car 38 driven by Anthony Davidson, António Félix da Costa and Roberto Gonzalez finished second in class, 6th overall, at the 2020 24 Hours of Le Mans whilst car 37, partnered with Jackie Chan DC Racing, driven by Ho-Pin Tung, Will Stevens and Gabriel Aubry failed to finish. For the second year running, car 38 finished second in the WEC and car 37 finished third.

=== 2021 ===
The 2021 FIA World Endurance Championship returned to a summer schedule and Jota ran the two Oreca 07 LMP2 cars with Gibson Technology 4.2 V8 engines but with a change of number for the 37 car to number 28 and a new trio of drivers – Tom Blomqvist, Sean Gelael and Stoffel Vandoorne. Car 38 was driven by António Félix da Costa, Roberto Gonzalez and Will Stevens. Car 28 finished second in class and 8th overall at 2021 24 Hours of Le Mans while car 38 was 8th in class and 13th overall. At the end of the season, car 28 took second place in the 2021 FIA World Endurance Championship, followed by car 38 in third place.

This year also saw Jota partner with Era Motorsport in the 2021 Asian Le Mans Series, running an Oreca 07 LMP2 car, where they finished 2021 LMP2 Am class champions.

=== 2022 ===
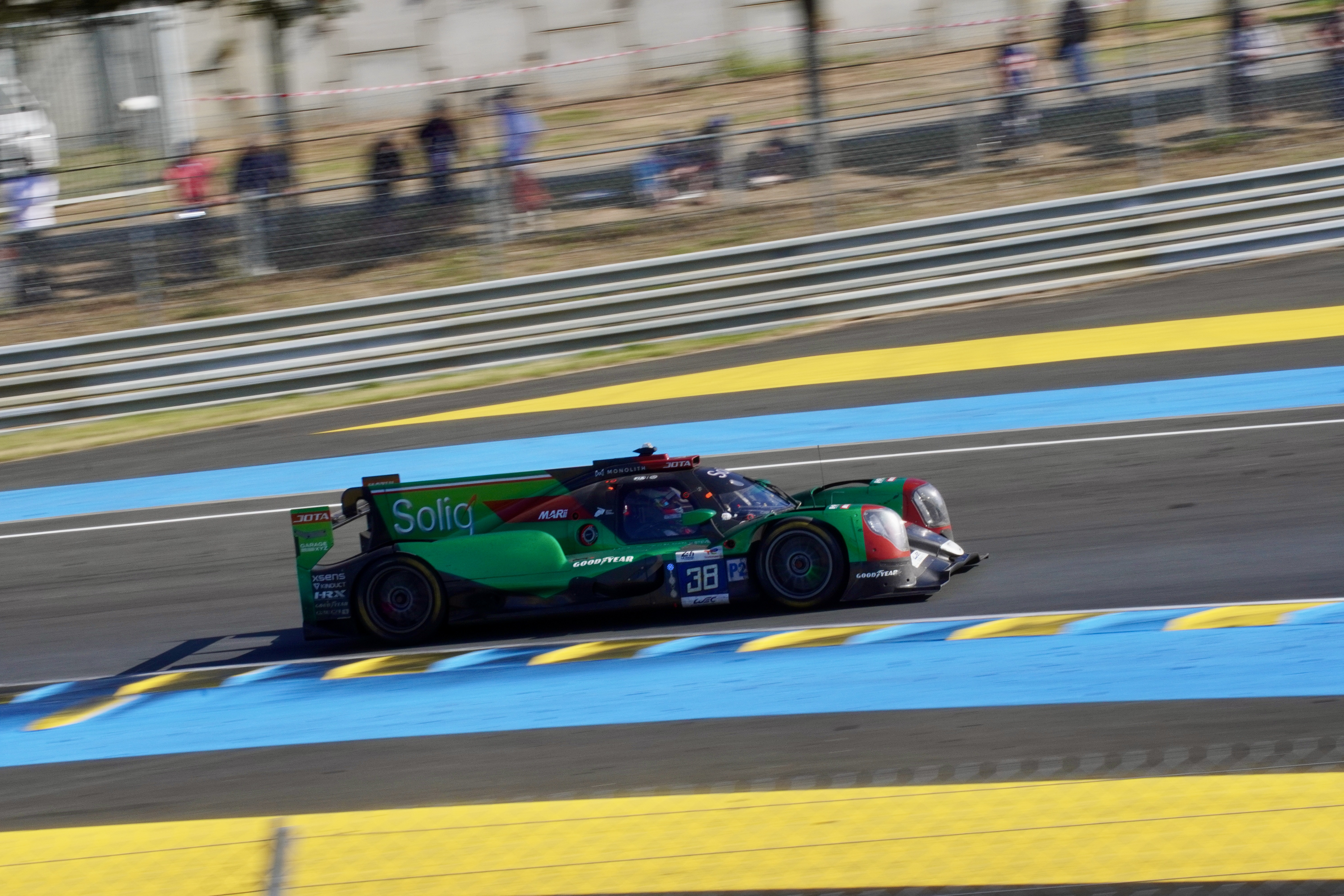
The Oreca 07 that won the 2022 24 Hours of Le Mans in the LMP2 class

A dominating season for car 38, driven by António Félix da Costa, Roberto Gonzalez and Will Stevens; first in class, 5th overall, at 2022 24 Hours of Le Mans and five podiums out of six during the 2022 FIA World Endurance Championship saw Jota win the championship for the first time, 21 points ahead of the competition. Car 28, driven by Oliver Rasmussen, Ed Jones and Jonathan Aberdein, finished third in class, 7th overall, at Le Mans and finished the WEC in 6th place.

=== 2023 ===
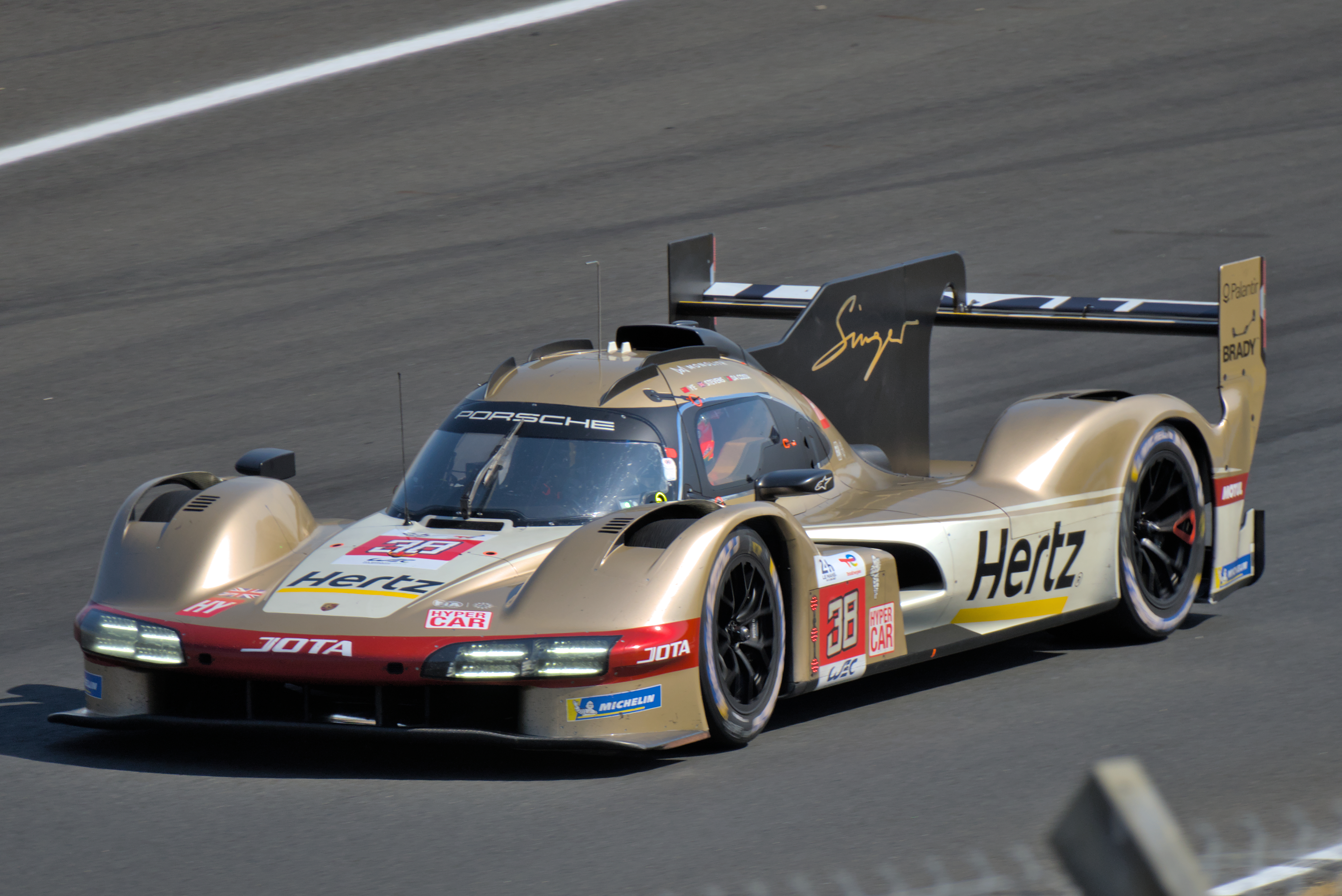
The #38 Porsche 963 ran by Jota Sport for the 2023 WEC season

Jota Sport will become Porsche's customer racing team to campaign the Porsche 963 LMDh racing car in the Hypercar class of the FIA World Endurance Championship as a new name Hertz Team JOTA. Porsche later announced that the first customer 963s would not be delivered until April 2023 due to delays caused by supply chain disruptions, forcing the team to miss the opening races of the WEC, something that the teams understood when engaging in talks with Porsche to take delivery. In November 2022, the team announced that Chinese Driver Yifei Ye will join team. Ye will become part of the Hertz Team Jota Hypercar programme alongside António Félix da Costa and Will Stevens. With the advent of their Hypercar program and continued presence in LMP2, Jota paused their factory GT3 program for 2023.

=== 2024 ===
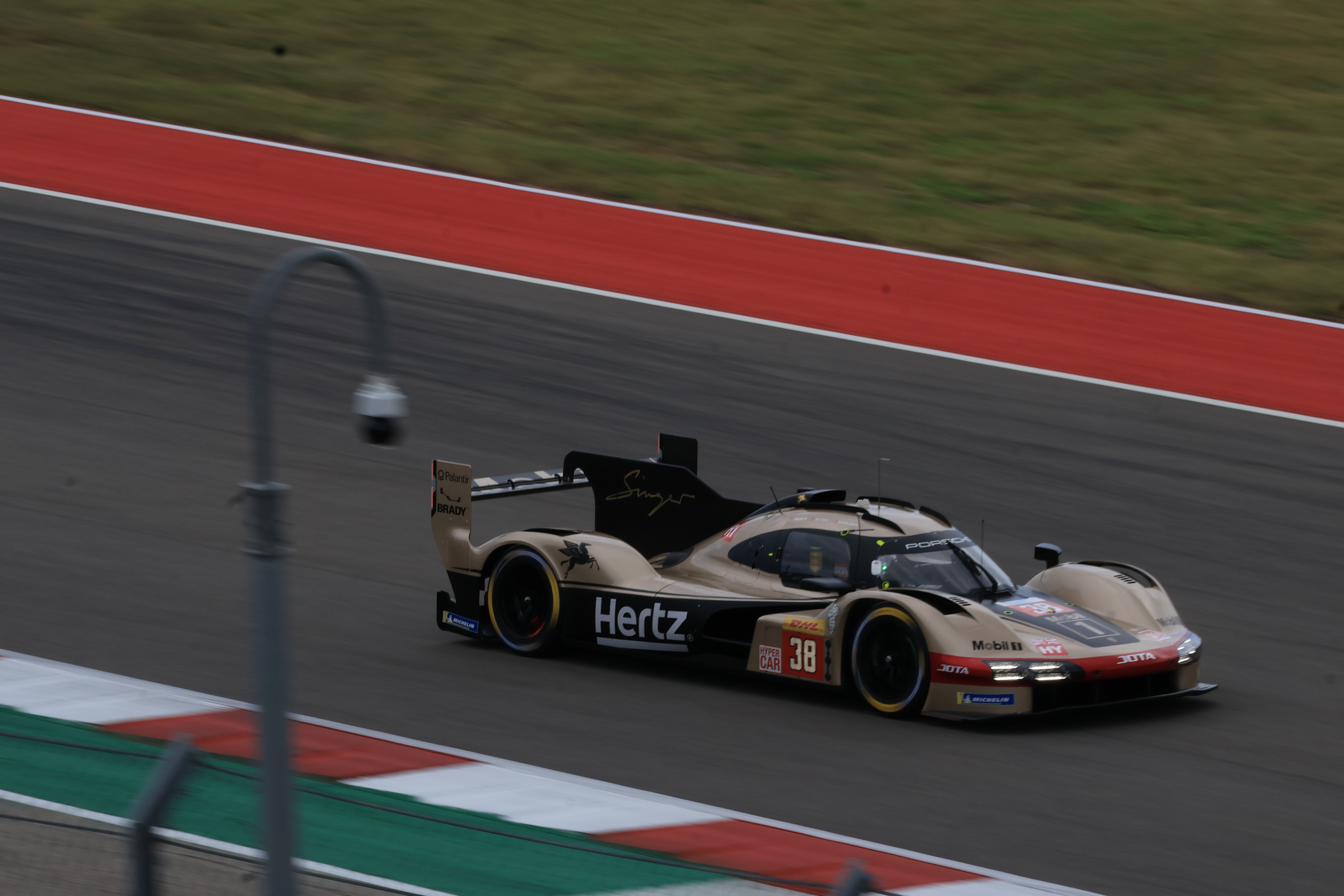
The #38 Porsche 963 in a special livery celebrating Mobil 1 at the Lone Star Le Mans, in Texas.

For the 2024 season, Jota expanded to two Porsche 963 Hypercars, with numbers 12 and 38; drivers include Callum Ilott, Norman Nato, Will Stevens, and Jenson Button, Phil Hanson, Oliver Rasmussen, respectively. The number 12 crew took a surprise win at Spa, after a Red flag and a reinstatement of racing time pushed them to the lead on pit strategy. Hertz's partnership with seven-time Super Bowl champion Tom Brady is the primary reason for that car carrying No. 12.

=== 2025 ===
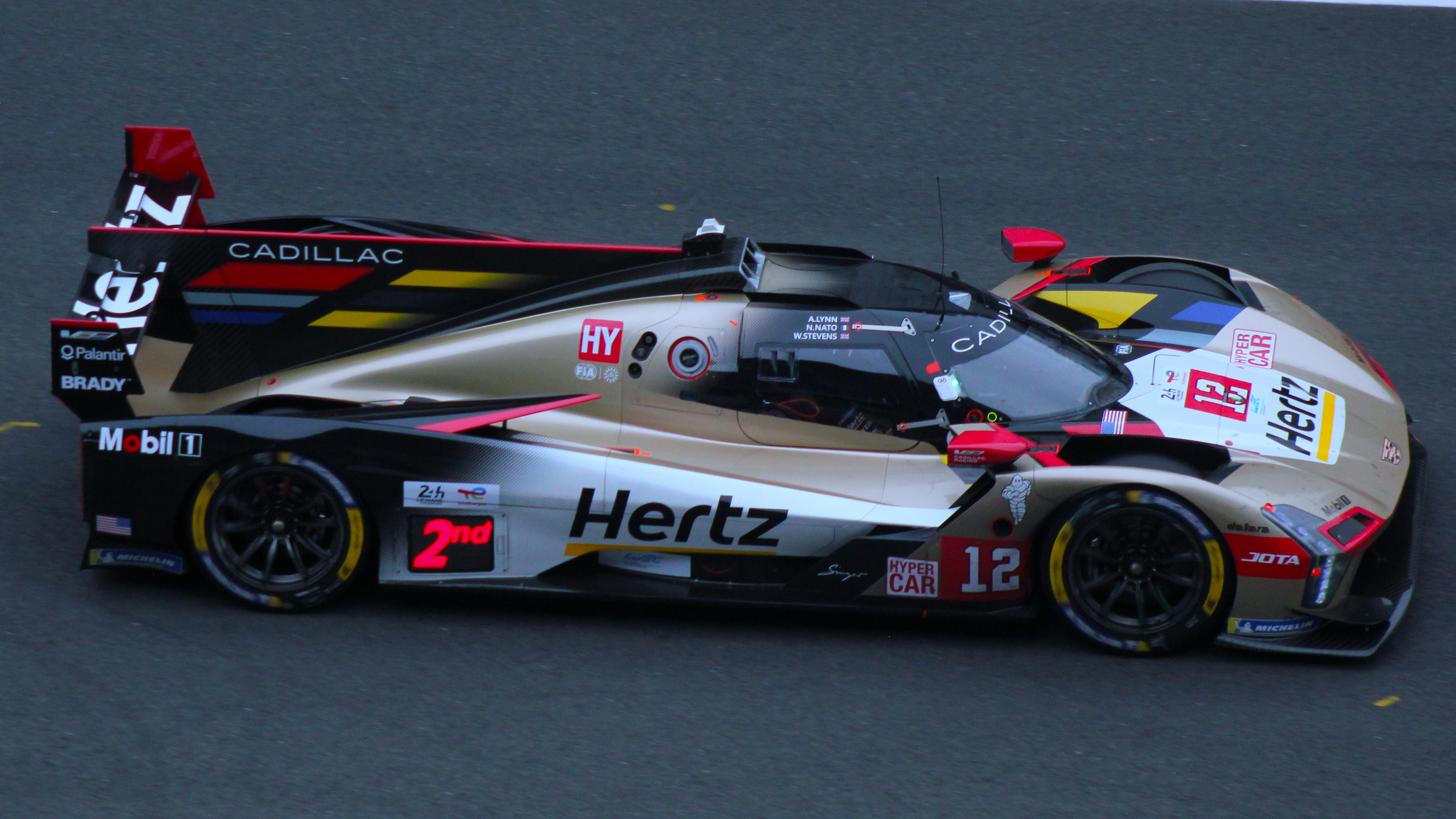
The No. 12 V-Series.R during the 24 Hours of Le Mans.

For the 2025 Season, Hertz Team Jota announced they will be switching to running the Cadillac V-Series.R, meaning they will run as a factory entry for the first time.

On 14 November 2024, the team confirmed that their new driver lineup for next year would be Sebastian Bourdais, Alex Lynn and Earl Bamber, alongside existing drivers Will Stevens, Norman Nato, and Jenson Button.

== Racing Record ==
=== 24 Hours of Le Mans results ===
Year	Entrant	No	Car	Drivers	Class	Laps	Pos.	Class Pos.
2005	(United Kingdom) Team Jota - Zytek	9	Zytek 04S	(United Kingdom) Sam Hignett (Japan) Haruki Kurosawa (United Kingdom) John Stack	LMP1	325	NC	NC
2006	(United Kingdom) Zytek Engineering (Denmark) Team Essex Invest	2	Zytek 06S	(Denmark) Philip Andersen (Denmark) Casper Elgaard (Denmark) John Nielsen	LMP1	269	24th	5th
2007	(Czech Republic) Charouz Racing System	15	Lola B07/17-Judd	(Czech Republic) Jan Charouz (Germany) Stefan Mücke (Malaysia) Alex Yoong	LMP1	338	8th	5th
2008	(Czech Republic) Charouz Racing System (United States) Team Cytosport	12	Lola B07/17-Judd	(Germany) Klaus Graf (Netherlands) Jan Lammers (United States) Greg Pickett	LMP1	146	DNF	DNF
2011	(United Kingdom) Jota Sport	79	Aston Martin Vantage GT2	(United Kingdom) Chris Buncombe (United Kingdom) Simon Dolan (United Kingdom) Sam Hancock	GTE Pro	74	DNF	DNF
2012	(United Kingdom) Jota Sport	38	Zytek Z11SN-Nissan	(United Kingdom) Simon Dolan (United Kingdom) Sam Hancock (Japan) Haruki Kurosawa	LMP2	271	DNF	DNF
2013	(United Kingdom) Jota Sport	38	Zytek Z11SN-Nissan	(United Kingdom) Simon Dolan (Germany) Lucas Luhr (United Kingdom) Oliver Turvey	LMP2	319	13th	7th
2014	(United Kingdom) Jota Sport	38	Zytek Z11SN-Nissan	(United Kingdom) Simon Dolan (United Kingdom) Harry Tincknell (United Kingdom) Oliver Turvey (Note: Marc Gené was originally scheduled to drive the No. 38 Jota Sport Zytek before being called up to replace the injured Loïc Duval in the No. 1 Audi. Jota replaced Gené with Oliver Turvey, who drove the car for the first time in Thursday qualifying.)	LMP2	356	5th	1st
2015	(United Kingdom) Jota Sport	38	Zytek Z11SN-Nissan	(United Kingdom) Simon Dolan (New Zealand) Mitch Evans (United Kingdom) Oliver Turvey	LMP2	358	10th	2nd
2016	(Russia) G-Drive Racing	26	Oreca 05-Nissan	(Germany) René Rast (Russia) Roman Rusinov (United Kingdom) Will Stevens	LMP2	357	6th	2nd
2016	(Russia) G-Drive Racing	38	Gibson 015S-Nissan	(United Kingdom) Jake Dennis (United Kingdom) Simon Dolan (Netherlands) Giedo van der Garde	LMP2	222	DNF	DNF
2017	(China) Jackie Chan DC Racing	37	Oreca 07-Gibson	(United Kingdom) Alex Brundle (United States) David Cheng (France) Tristan Gommendy	LMP2	363	3rd	2nd
2017	(China) Jackie Chan DC Racing	38	Oreca 07-Gibson	(United Kingdom) Oliver Jarvis (France) Thomas Laurent (China) Ho-Pin Tung	LMP2	366	2nd	1st
2018	(China) Jackie Chan DC Racing	37	Oreca 07-Gibson	(Malaysia) Jazeman Jaafar (Malaysia) Nabil Jeffri (Malaysia) Weiron Tan	LMP2	361	8th	4th
2018	(China) Jackie Chan DC Racing	38	Oreca 07-Gibson	(France) Gabriel Aubry (Monaco) Stephane Richelmi (China) Ho-Pin Tung	LMP2	356	10th	6th
2019	(China) Jackie Chan DC Racing	37	Oreca 07-Gibson	(Denmark) David Heinemeier Hansson (United Kingdom) Jordan King (United States) Ricky Taylor	LMP2	199	DNF	DNF
2019	(China) Jackie Chan DC Racing	38	Oreca 07-Gibson	(France) Gabriel Aubry (Monaco) Stephane Richelmi (China) Ho-Pin Tung	LMP2	367	7th	2nd
2020	(China) Jackie Chan DC Racing	37	Oreca 07-Gibson	(France) Gabriel Aubry (United Kingdom) Will Stevens (China) Ho-Pin Tung	LMP2	141	DSQ	DSQ
2020	(United Kingdom) Jota	38	Oreca 07-Gibson	(Portugal) Antonio Felix da Costa (United Kingdom) Anthony Davidson (Mexico) Roberto González	LMP2	370	6th	2nd
2021	(United Kingdom) Jota	28	Oreca 07-Gibson	(United Kingdom) Tom Blomqvist (Indonesia) Sean Gelael (Belgium) Stoffel Vandoorne	LMP2	363	7th	2nd
2021	(United Kingdom) Jota	38	Oreca 07-Gibson	(Portugal) António Félix da Costa (Mexico) Roberto González (United Kingdom) Anthony Davidson	LMP2	358	13th	8th
2022	(United Kingdom) Jota	28	Oreca 07-Gibson	(South Africa) Jonathan Aberdein (United Kingdom) Ed Jones (Denmark) Oliver Rasmussen	LMP2	368	7th	3rd
2022	(United Kingdom) Jota	38	Oreca 07-Gibson	(Portugal) António Félix da Costa (Mexico) Roberto González (United Kingdom) Will Stevens	LMP2	369	5th	1st
2023	(United Kingdom) Hertz Team Jota	38	Porsche 963	(Portugal) António Félix da Costa (United Kingdom) Will Stevens (China) Yifei Ye	Hypercar	244	40th	13th
2023	(United Kingdom) Jota	28	Oreca 07-Gibson	(Brazil) Pietro Fittipaldi (Denmark) David Heinemeier Hansson (Denmark) Oliver Rasmussen	LMP2	316	24th	13th
2024	(United Kingdom) Hertz Team Jota	12	Porsche 963	(United Kingdom) Callum Ilott (France) Norman Nato (United Kingdom) Will Stevens	Hypercar	311	8th	8th
2024	(United Kingdom) Hertz Team Jota	38	Porsche 963	(United Kingdom) Jenson Button (United Kingdom) Philip Hanson (Denmark) Oliver Rasmussen	Hypercar	311	9th	9th
2025	(United States) Cadillac Hertz Team Jota	12	Cadillac V-Series.R	(United Kingdom) Alex Lynn (France) Norman Nato (United Kingdom) Will Stevens	Hypercar	387	4th	4th
2025	(United States) Cadillac Hertz Team Jota	38	Cadillac V-Series.R	(New Zealand) Earl Bamber (France) Sébastien Bourdais (United Kingdom) Jenson Button	Hypercar	386	7th	7th
2026	(United States) Cadillac Hertz Team Jota	12	Cadillac V-Series.R	(Switzerland) Louis Delétraz (France) Norman Nato (United Kingdom) Will Stevens	Hypercar	381	4th	4th
2026	(United States) Cadillac Hertz Team Jota	38	Cadillac V-Series.R	(United Kingdom) Jack Aitken (New Zealand) Earl Bamber (France) Sébastien Bourdais	Hypercar	218	DNF	DNF

=== Complete FIA World Endurance Championship results ===
Year	Entrant	Class	No	Chassis	Engine	Drivers	1	2	3	4	5	6	7	8	9	Pos.	Pts
2016	(Russia) G-Drive Racing	LMP2	26	Oreca 05	Nissan VK45DE 4.5 L V8	(Russia) Roman Rusinov (Germany) René Rast (France) Nathanaël Berthon (United Kingdom) Will Stevens (United Kingdom) Alex Brundle	SIL; 3	SPA; 5	LMN; 2	NUR; NC	MEX; 8	COTA; 3	FUJ; 1	SHA; 1	BHR; 1	3rd	164
2016	(Russia) G-Drive Racing	LMP2	38	Gibson 015S	Nissan VK45DE 4.5 L V8	(United Kingdom) Simon Dolan (United Kingdom) Jake Dennis (Netherlands) Giedo van der Garde	SIL	SPA; 6	LMN; NC	NUR	MEX	COTA	FUJ	SHA	BHR		
2017	(China) Jackie Chan DC Racing	LMP2	37	Oreca 07	Gibson GK428 4.2 L V8	(United States) David Cheng (France) Tristan Gommendy (United Kingdom) Alex Brundle	SIL; 8	SPA; 10	LMN; 2	NUR; 5	MEX; 6	COTA; 5	FUJ; NC	SHA; 8	BHR; 8	7th	77
2017	(China) Jackie Chan DC Racing	LMP2	38	Oreca 07	Gibson GK428 4.2 L V8	(China) Ho-Pin Tung (France) Thomas Laurent (United Kingdom) Oliver Jarvis	SIL; 1	SPA; 3	LMN; 1	NUR; 1	MEX; 9	COTA; 4	FUJ; 3	SHA; 4	BHR; 2	2nd	175
2018 - 2019	(China) Jackie Chan DC Racing	LMP2	37	Oreca 07	Gibson GK428 4.2 L V8	(Malaysia) Jazeman Jaafar (Malaysia) Weiron Tan (Malaysia) Nabil Jeffri (Denmark) David Heinemeier Hansson (United Kingdom) Jordan King (United Kingdom) Will Stevens (United States) Ricky Taylor	SPA; 4	LMN; 4	SIL; 2	FUJ; 1	SHA; 4	SEB; 1	SPA; 7	LMN; Ret		3rd	138
2018 - 2019	(China) Jackie Chan DC Racing	LMP2	38	Oreca 07	Gibson GK428 4.2 L V8	(France) Gabriel Aubry (Monaco) Stéphane Richelmi (China) Ho-Pin Tung	SPA; 2	LMN; 6	SIL; 1	FUJ; 2	SHA; 1	SEB; 6	SPA; 4	LMN; 2		2nd	166
2019 - 2020	(China) Jackie Chan DC Racing	LMP2	37	Oreca 07	Gibson GK428 4.2 L V8	(United Kingdom) Will Stevens (China) Ho-Pin Tung (France) Gabriel Aubry (Republic of Ireland) Ryan Cullen	SIL; 4	FUJ; 2	SHA; 2	BHR; 3	COTA; 2	SPA; 6	LMN; DSQ	BHR; 1		3rd	136
2019 - 2020	(United Kingdom) Jota Sport	LMP2	38	Oreca 07	Gibson GK428 4.2 L V8	(Portugal) António Félix da Costa (Mexico) Roberto González (United Kingdom) Anthony Davidson	SIL; 5	FUJ; DSQ	SHA; 1	BHR; 2	COTA; 3	SPA; 4	LMN; 2	BHR; 2		2nd	152
2021	(United Kingdom) Jota Sport	LMP2	28	Oreca 07	Gibson GK428 4.2 L V8	(United Kingdom) Tom Blomqvist (Indonesia) Sean Gelael (Belgium) Stoffel Vandoorne	SPA; 3	POR; 2	MNZ; 5	LMN; 2	BHR; 2	BHR; 3				2nd	131
2021	(United Kingdom) Jota Sport	LMP2	38	Oreca 07	Gibson GK428 4.2 L V8	(United Kingdom) Anthony Davidson (Portugal) António Félix da Costa (Mexico) Roberto González	SPA; 2	POR; 1	MNZ; NC	LMN; 8	BHR; 3	BHR; 2				3rd	123
2022	(United Kingdom) Jota Sport	LMP2	28	Oreca 07	Gibson GK428 4.2 L V8	(South Africa) Jonathan Aberdein (United Kingdom) Ed Jones (Denmark) Oliver Rasmussen	SEB; 5	SPA; NC	LMN; 3	MNZ; 10	FUJ; 3	BHR; 7				6th	70
2022	(United Kingdom) Jota Sport	LMP2	38	Oreca 07	Gibson GK428 4.2 L V8	(Portugal) António Félix da Costa (Mexico) Roberto González (United Kingdom) Will Stevens	SEB; 6	SPA; 3	LMN; 1	MNZ; 2	FUJ; 2	BHR; 3				1st	137
2023	(United Kingdom) Jota	LMP2	28	Oreca 07	Gibson GK428 4.2 L V8	(Denmark) David Heinemeier Hansson (Brazil) Pietro Fittipaldi (Denmark) Oliver Rasmussen	SEB; 6	POR; 5	SPA; 9	LMN; 13	MNZ; 1	FUJ; 6	BHR; 3			6th	84
2023	(United Kingdom) Hertz Team Jota	LMP2	48	Oreca 07	Gibson GK428 4.2 L V8	(Germany) David Beckmann (China) Yifei Ye (United Kingdom) Will Stevens	SEB; 1	POR; 5	SPA	LMN	MNZ	FUJ				N/C	N/A
2023	(United Kingdom) Hertz Team Jota	Hypercar	38	Porsche 963	Porsche 9RD 4.6 L twin-turbo V8	(Portugal) António Félix da Costa (United Kingdom) Will Stevens (China) Yifei Ye	SEB	POR	SPA; 6	LMN; 13	MNZ; 9	FUJ; 6	BHR; 4			1st	163
2024	(United Kingdom) Hertz Team Jota	Hypercar	12	Porsche 963	Porsche 9RD 4.6 L twin-turbo V8	(United Kingdom) Callum Ilott (France) Norman Nato (United Kingdom) Will Stevens	QAT; 2	IMO; 14	SPA; 1	LMS; 8	SAP; 18	COTA; Ret	FUJ; 5	BHR; 13		1st	183
2024	(United Kingdom) Hertz Team Jota	Hypercar	38	Porsche 963	Porsche 9RD 4.6 L twin-turbo V8	(United Kingdom) Jenson Button (United Kingdom) Phil Hanson (Denmark) Oliver Rasmussen	QAT; Ret	IMO; 11	SPA; Ret	LMS; 9	SAP; 7	COTA; 10	FUJ; 6	BHR; 7		2nd	153
2025	(United States) Cadillac Hertz Team Jota	Hypercar	12	Cadillac V-Series.R	Cadillac LMC55R 5.5 L V8	(France) Norman Nato (United Kingdom) Alex Lynn (United Kingdom) Will Stevens	QAT; 8	IMO; 10	SPA; 5	LMS; 4	SAP; 1	COTA; 8	FUJ; 6	BHR; 6		5th	93
2025	(United States) Cadillac Hertz Team Jota	Hypercar	38	Cadillac V-Series.R	Cadillac LMC55R 5.5 L V8	(New Zealand) Earl Bamber (France) Sébastien Bourdais (United Kingdom) Jenson Button	QAT; 16	IMO; 16	SPA; 6	LMS; 7	SAP; 2	COTA; 6	FUJ; 13	BHR; 16		10th	46

- *Season still in progress

=== Complete European Le Mans Series results ===
Year	Entrant	Class	No	Chassis	Engine	Drivers	1	2	3	4	5	6	Pos.	Pts
2012	(United Kingdom) Jota	LMP2	38	Zytek Z11SN	Nissan VK45DE 4.5 L V8	(United Kingdom) Sam Hancock (United Kingdom) Simon Dolan	LEC; 9	DON; Ret	ATL				10th	2
2013	(United Kingdom) Jota Sport	LMP2	38	Zytek Z11SN	Nissan VK45DE 4.5 L V8	(United Kingdom) Simon Dolan (United Kingdom) Oliver Turvey	SIL; 1	IMO; Ret	RBR; 4	HUN; 3	LEC; 3		3rd	71
2014	(United Kingdom) Jota Sport	LMP2	38	Zytek Z11SN	Nissan VK45DE 4.5 L V8	(Portugal) Filipe Albuquerque (United Kingdom) Simon Dolan (United Kingdom) Harry Tincknell	SIL; NC	IMO; 1	RBR; 2	LEC; 4	EST; 3		2nd	74
2015	(United Kingdom) Jota Sport	LMP2	38	Gibson 015S	Nissan VK45DE 4.5 L V8	(Portugal) Filipe Albuquerque (United Kingdom) Simon Dolan (United Kingdom) Harry Tincknell	SIL; 2	IMO; 3	RBR; 1	LEC; 3	EST; 4		3rd	89
2016	(Russia) G-Drive Racing	LMP2	38	Gibson 015S	Nissan VK45DE 4.5 L V8	(United Kingdom) Simon Dolan (Netherlands) Giedo van der Garde (United Kingdom) Harry Tincknell	SIL; 1	IMO; 2	RBR; 3	LEC; 5	SPA; 5	EST; 1	1st	103
2020	(United Kingdom) Jota Sport	LMP2	38	Oreca 07	Gibson GK428 4.2 L V8	(United Kingdom) Anthony Davidson (United Kingdom) Jake Dennis (Mexico) Roberto González	LEC	SPA; 8	LEC	MNZ	POR			
2021	(United Kingdom) Jota Sport	LMP2	82	Oreca 07	Gibson GK428 4.2 L V8	(Indonesia) Sean Gelael (Malaysia) Jazeman Jaafar	CAT	RBR	LEC	MNZ; 3	SPA	POR		

=== Complete GT World Challenge Europe Endurance Cup results ===
Year	Entrant	Class	No	Car	Drivers	1	2	3	4	5	Pos.	Pts
2021	(United Kingdom) Jota Sport	Pro	38	McLaren 720S GT3	(United Kingdom) Ben Barnicoat (United Kingdom) Rob Bell (United Kingdom) Ollie Wilkinson	MNZ; Ret	LEC; 16	SPA; 7	NUR	CAT	12th	21
2022	(United Kingdom) Jota Sport	Pro	38	McLaren 720S GT3	(United Kingdom) Rob Bell (Germany) Marvin Kirchhöfer (United Kingdom) Ollie Wilkinson	IMO; 10	LEC; Ret	SPA; 8	HOC; Ret	CAT; 10	10th	24

=== Complete GT World Challenge Europe Sprint Cup results ===
Year	Entrant	Class	No	Car	Drivers	1		2		3		4		5		Pos.	Pts
2021	(United Kingdom) Jota Sport	Pro	38	McLaren 720S GT3	(United Kingdom) Ben Barnicoat (United Kingdom) Ollie Wilkinson	MAG 1; 17	MAG 2; 4	ZAN 1	ZAN 2	MIS 1; 22	MIS 2; 8	BRH 1; 28	BRH 2 DNS	VAL 1; 22	VAL 2; 4	10th	23
2022	(United Kingdom) Jota Sport	Pro	38	McLaren 720S GT3	(United Kingdom) Rob Bell (United Kingdom) Ollie Wilkinson	BRH 1; 12	BRH 2; 10	MAG 1	MAG 2	ZAN 1	ZAN 2	MIS 1	MIS 2	VAL 1	VAL 2	13th	6
