= William Stephen =

William Stephen may refer to:

- William Fitzstephen (died c. 1191), cleric and administrator in the service of Thomas Becket
- William Stephani or Stephenson (fl. 1415–1425), medieval prelate
- William Stephen (Australian politician) (1829–1913), New South Wales colonial politician
- Bill Stephen (politician) (1921–2013), Victorian (Australia) state politician
- Bill Stephen (born 1928), Australian rules footballer

== See also ==
- William Stephens (disambiguation)
