= William Stephens (d. 1697) =

Sir William Stephens (c.1641 –1697) was an English Member of Parliament.

He was the first son of William Stephens and his wife Anne Redman (widow of Edward Harbert) and was educated at the Middle Temple (1656) and New College, Oxford (1658).

He was the Member of Parliament for Newport (IoW) from 1685 to 1687 and 1689 to 1695. He was knighted in 1684 and appointed Lieutenant-Governor of the Isle of Wight for c.1689–93.

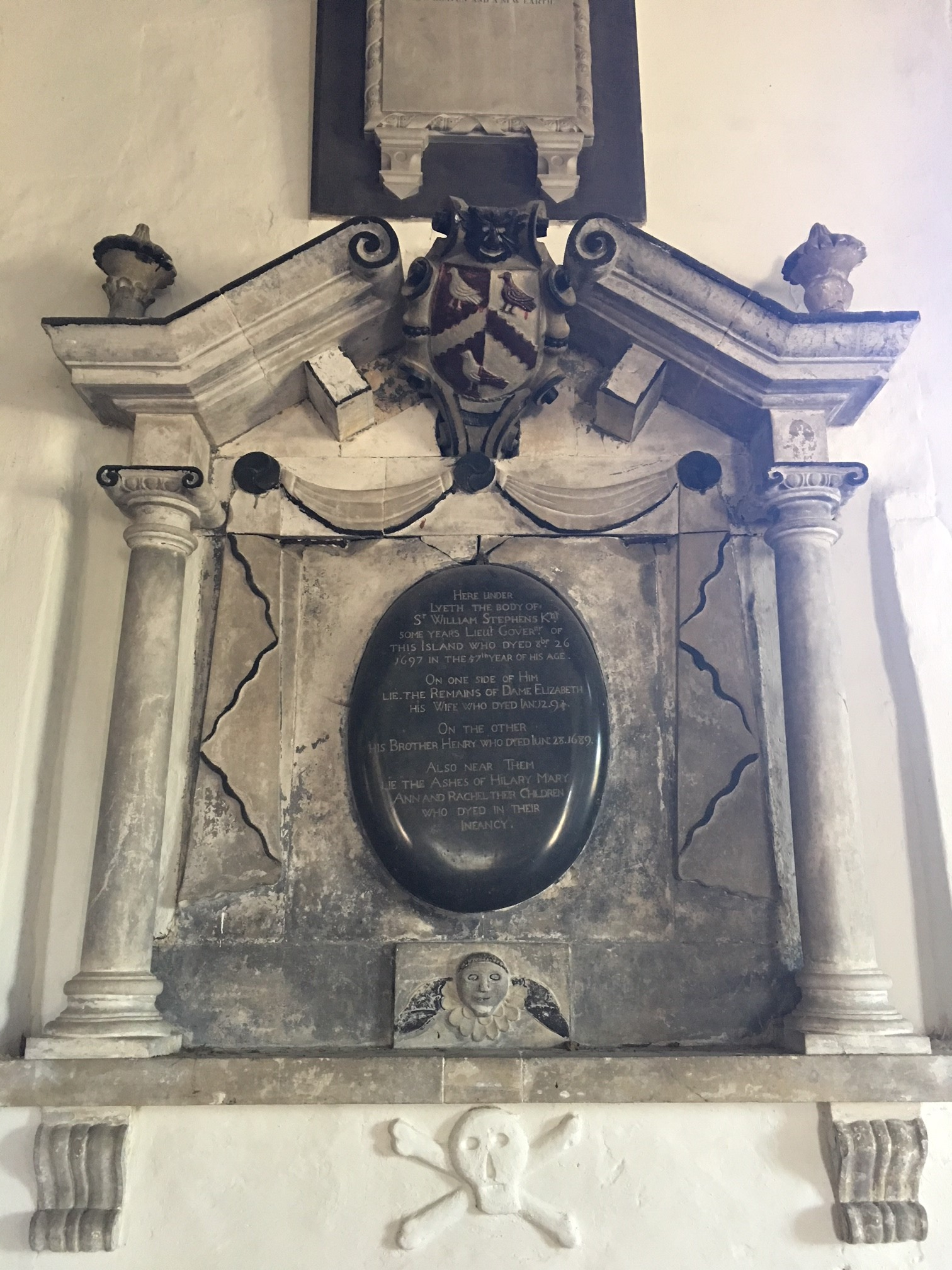
Memorial to William Stephens in St Mary's Church, Carisbrooke, Isle of Wight

He married Elizabeth, the daughter of Henry Hillary of Meerhay, Dorset, and had 2 sons and 5 daughters. Their son William was also an MP for Newport and later Governor of Georgia.

== See also ==
- William Stephens (disambiguation)
