= Will Stevens =

British racing driver (born 1991)

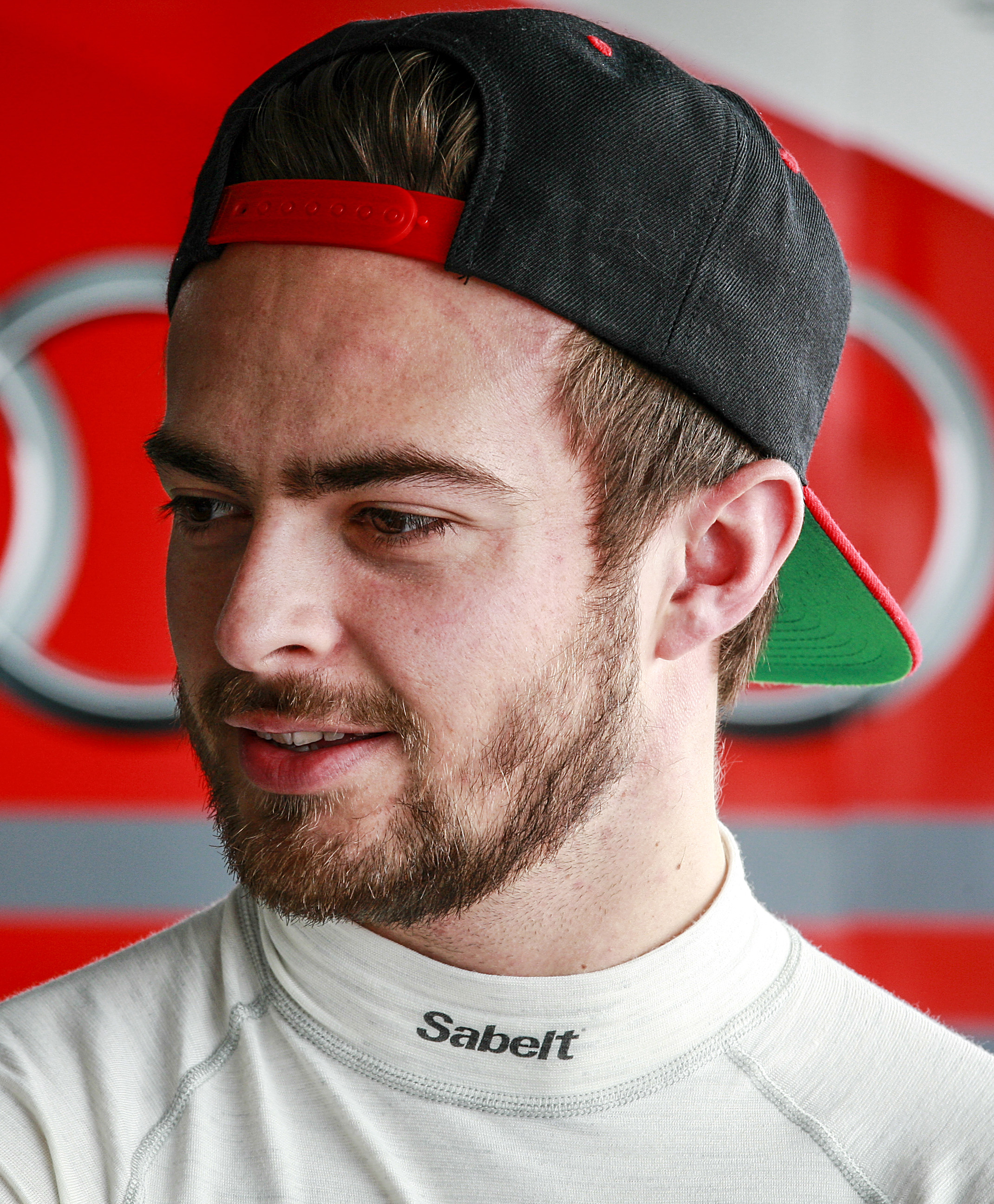
- Stevens in 2017
- Born: William Jonathan Richard Stevens; 28 June 1991 (age 35); Rochford, Essex, England

FIA World Endurance Championship career
- Debut season: 2016
- Current team: Cadillac Hertz Team Jota
- Categorisation: FIA Platinum
- Car number: 12
- Former teams: Manor, G-Drive, JMW, Jackie Chan DC
- Starts: 51
- Championships: 1 (2022)
- Wins: 8
- Podiums: 19
- Poles: 7
- Fastest laps: 5
- Best finish: 1st in 2022 (LMP2)

Formula One World Championship career
- Nationality: (United Kingdom) British
- Active years: 2014–2015
- Team(s): Caterham, Marussia
- Car number: 28 (Note: Stevens selected the number 28 as his personal driver number, per FIA regulations; at the 2014 Abu Dhabi Grand Prix, he competed using the standard reserve number 46 for Caterham.)
- Entries: 20 (18 starts)
- Championships: 0
- Wins: 0
- Podiums: 0
- Career points: 0
- Pole positions: 0
- Fastest laps: 0
- First entry: 2014 Abu Dhabi Grand Prix
- Last entry: 2015 Abu Dhabi Grand Prix

24 Hours of Le Mans career
- Years: 2016–2024
- Teams: G-Drive, JMW, Panis, Jackie Chan DC, Jota
- Best finish: 5th (2022)
- Class wins: 2 (2017, 2022)

Previous series
- 2016–2024; 2016–2018; 2012–2014; 2010; 2009–2011; 2009–2010; 2008–2009; 2008; 2008: ELMS; Blancpain GT Series; Formula Renault 3.5; Formula Renault NEC; Formula Renault Eurocup; British Formula Renault; Toyota Racing Series; FRUK Winter Series; FR Portugal Winter Series

William Jonathan Richard Stevens (born 28 June 1991) is a British racing driver who competes in the FIA World Endurance Championship for Cadillac Hertz Team Jota. He competed in Formula One from 2014 to 2015. In endurance racing, Stevens has won two Hypercar races and an LMP2 title with Jota.

In junior formulae, Stevens reached the Formula Renault 3.5 Series, where he placed fourth in 2013. He made his Formula One debut with Caterham at the 2014 season finale at Abu Dhabi, before driving a full season for Marussia in 2015. Stevens then entered sports car racing, and spent three seasons in the Blancpain GT Series in a Team WRT Audi.

In the FIA World Endurance Championship, Stevens took class wins at the 24 Hours of Le Mans in GTE Am and LMP2, as well as the LMP2 title in 2022. He has competed in Hypercar since 2023, driving for Jota in a privateer Porsche and later in a factory Cadillac.

== Early life and career ==
William Jonathan Richard Stevens was born on 28 June 1991 in Rochford, Essex, England.

=== Karting ===
Stevens started his racing career in 2003 at the age of 12 in karts. After one year of racing in the National Cadet Championship, he joined Rotax Mini Max. He raced in a lot of different championships in Britain and outside, and after finishing seventh in the Rotax class in Super One, he joined Formula Renault 2.0.

=== Formula Renault 2.0 ===
Stevens ended seventh in the 2009 Formula Renault 2.0 UK and fourth in 2010. In 2011, he switched to the Formula Renault 2.0 Eurocup, where he finished fourth.

=== Formula Renault 3.5 ===
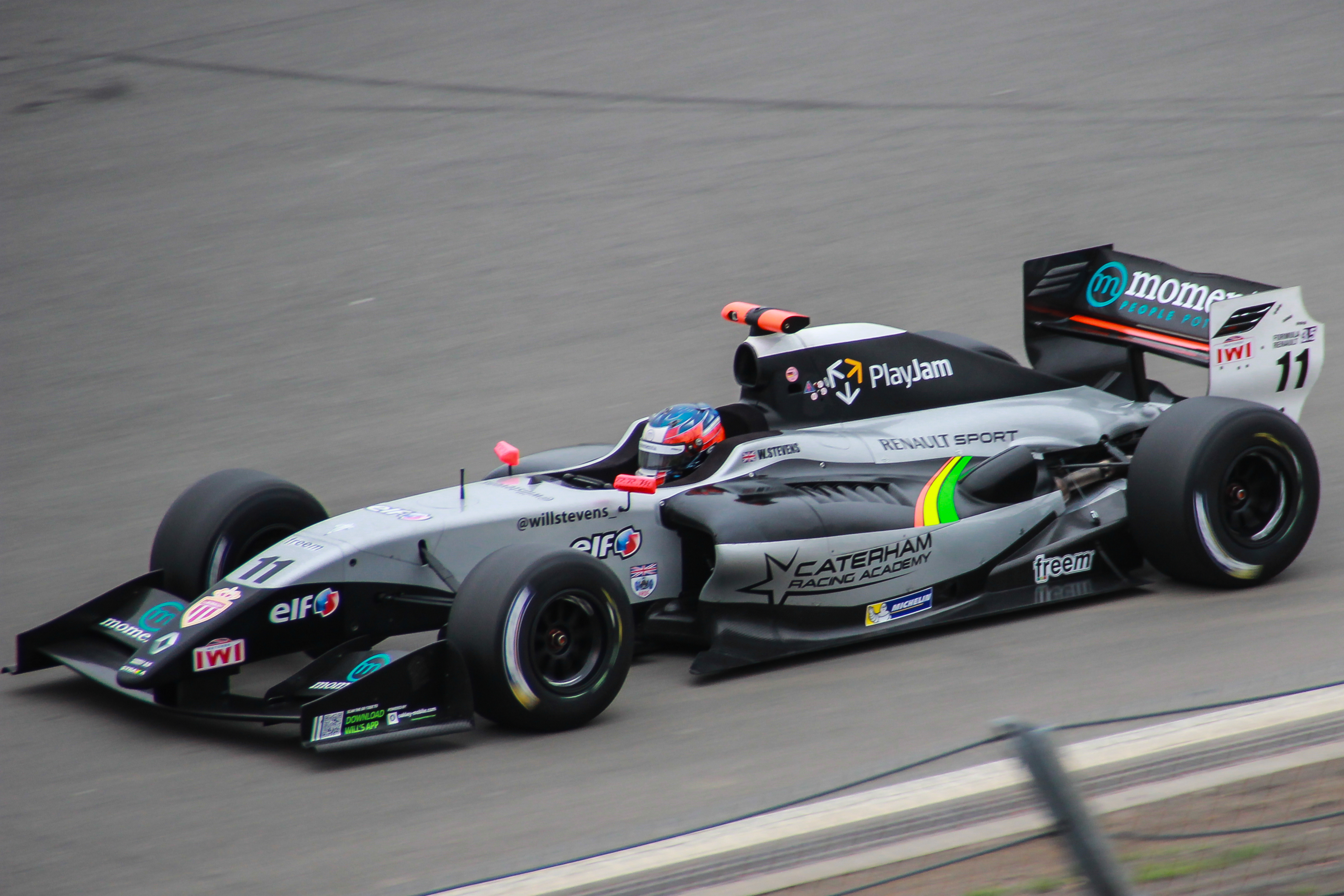
Stevens during the 2014 Formula Renault 3.5 Series season at the Nürburgring.

Stevens jumped to the Formula Renault 3.5 Series in 2012 for Carlin, finishing 12th in his first year. In 2013, this time driving for P1 by Strakka Racing, he scored five podiums in 17 races and ended fourth in the season standings. In 2014, he joined Strakka Racing, where got two wins and four podiums to finish sixth in points.

=== Formula One ===
==== Marussia and Caterham (2014) ====
In October 2014, Marussia F1 announced that Stevens had joined the team as a reserve driver for the remainder of the 2014 season. They had originally planned to run him in first practice session of the 2014 Japanese Grand Prix; however, they were unable to return the relevant paperwork to the FIA Contract Recognition Board in time.

The following month, Stevens made his Formula One debut with Caterham F1 at the 2014 Abu Dhabi Grand Prix, having previously tested for the team. He finished the race in 17th place, one lap down. He paid £500,000 for the privilege.

==== Marussia (2015) ====
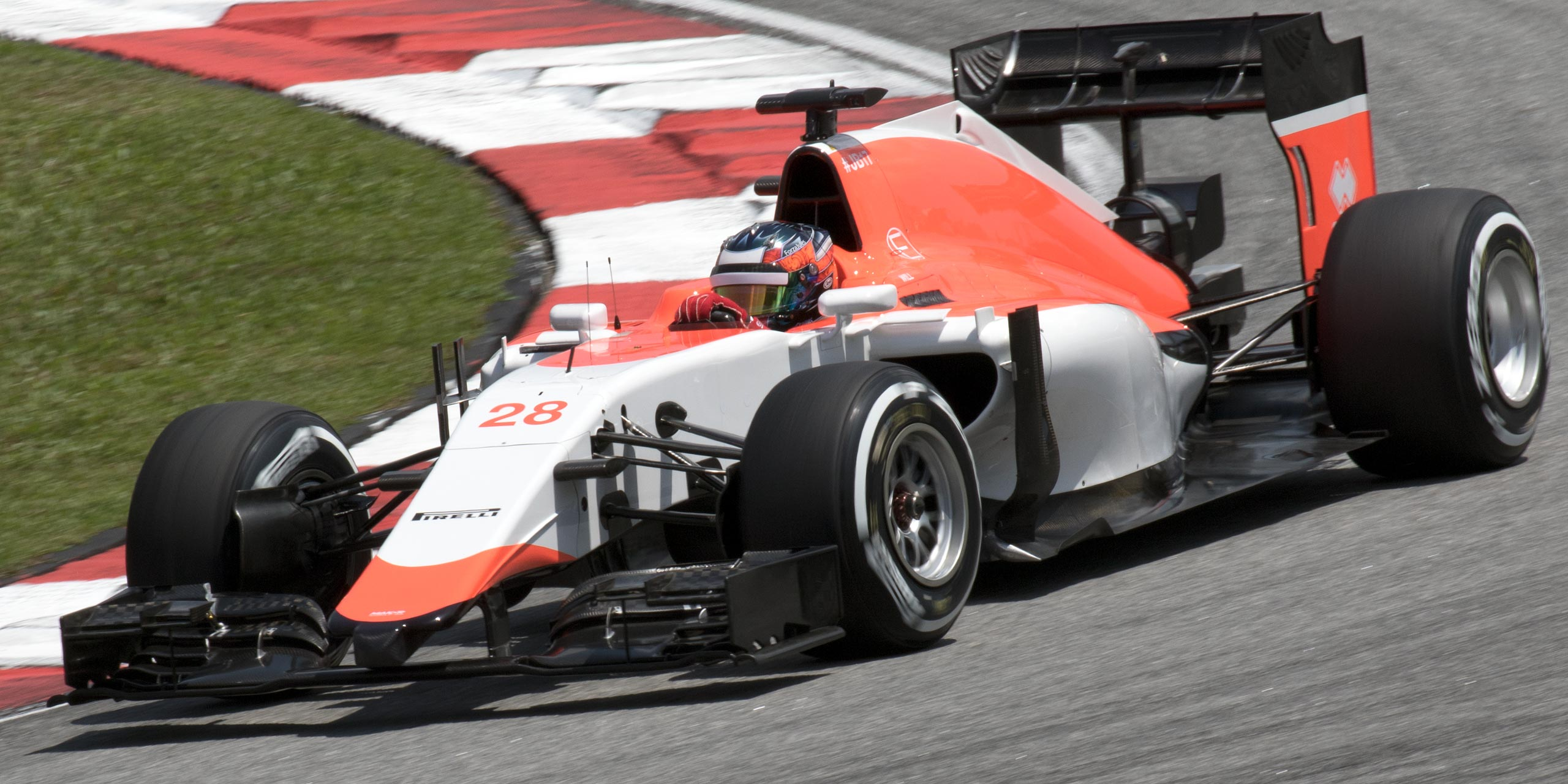
Stevens driving for Marussia at the 2015 Malaysian Grand Prix

In February 2015, Manor Marussia announced Stevens as one of their drivers whilst bringing substantial funding to the team, along with Roberto Merhi. Marussia attended the Australian Grand Prix but did not compete due to a technical issue. In the Malaysian Grand Prix, Stevens drove the Marussia car for the first time in Practice 1. However, he did not compete in qualifying or the race because of a problem with the fuel system. In the Chinese Grand Prix, Stevens finished his first race for Marussia in 15th place ahead of his teammate Merhi after being lapped twice by race winner Lewis Hamilton. Stevens finished ahead of Merhi in Bahrain and Spain. He finished behind Merhi in the Monaco Grand Prix in 16th. In the Canadian Grand Prix he qualified behind Merhi but moved up to 17th due to penalties to Jenson Button, Sebastian Vettel and Max Verstappen. In the race on lap 52, Romain Grosjean of Lotus was lapping Stevens but cut his left rear tyre while doing so, which caused both drivers to make an emergency pit stop. The mechanics of both Lotus and Marussia had little time to react to their drivers pitting so that meant both Grosjean and Stevens took long pit stops. Stevens complained to his team on the radio about the incident. Grosjean received a five-second penalty for the collision, but Stevens had dropped from being four seconds behind Merhi to a minute behind him. However, Merhi was forced to retire on lap 56 after a drive-shaft issue. Stevens eventually finished in 17th place, four laps down on race winner Lewis Hamilton. After the race, Grosjean apologised to Stevens for the incident. During the later races of the season, Merhi was replaced by Alexander Rossi who outpaced Stevens in three of four races.

=== WEC and Blancpain (2016) ===
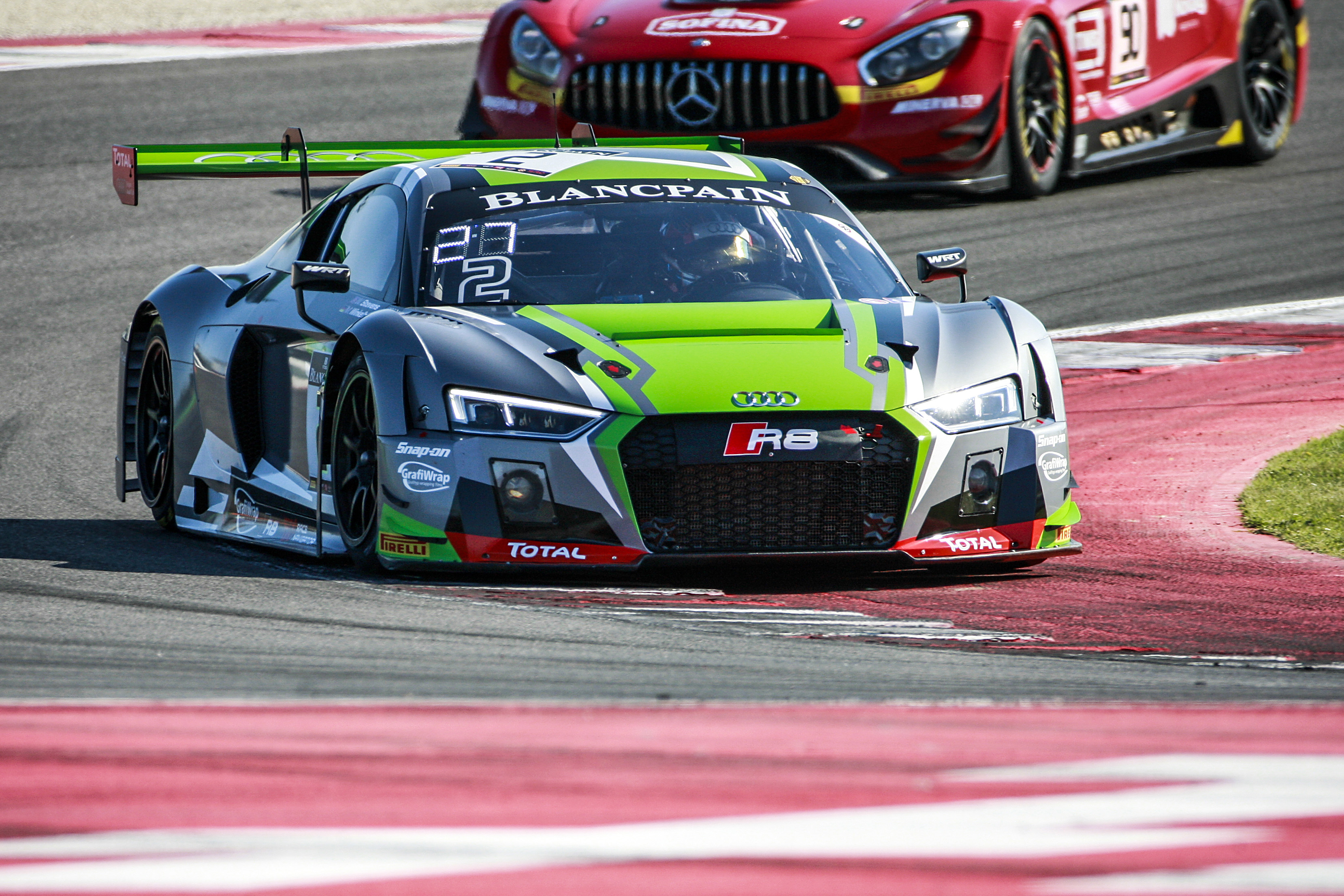
Will Stevens races in the 2017 Blancpain Endurance Series with Belgian Audi Club Team WRT.

In February 2016, Manor Motorsport, a team made by former Manor Racing employees John Booth and Graeme Lowdon, decided to compete in the FIA World Endurance Championship, with Stevens and former Manor F3 driver Tor Graves. The following month, it was announced that Stevens would dovetail his WEC campaign with racing in the 2016 Blancpain GT Series for the W Racing Team, driving an Audi R8 LMS with René Rast.

=== Le Mans 24 Hours (2017) ===
In May 2017, it was confirmed that Stevens would co-drive the JMW Ferrari 488 GTE-Am alongside two Le Mans 'rookies', nineteen-year-old Dries Vanthoor of Belgium and British driver Rob Smith. The team's Ferrari 488 was fresh out of the box, making its race debut, and was quickly on the pace; third-quickest in first free-practice. The team focused on fulfilling driver qualification requirements in First Qualifying (eighth in GTE-Am, 3:56.890), but pushed on in Second Qualifying, with Dries Vanthoor the first to better the old class lap record (3:54.543). Stevens then sliced half a second off this by posting a 3:53.981 to lay claim to provisional class pole. In third and final qualifying, the team completed race-preparation of the all-new car, and a succession of yellow flags prevented personal improvements for the JMW drivers. The car lined up sixth in GTE-Am for the race. Stevens drove the first stint, moving through to fourth in class. His co-drivers continued the advance, the team capturing third at 5:40 pm, and then second three hours into the race. Shortly after 10 pm, the No. 84 JMW Ferrari took the GTE-Am lead, and from there steadily built up an advantage that extended to over two laps at the finish. The car completed 333 laps and crossed the line 27th overall. Stevens set the fastest lap for the JMW Ferrari of 3:54.461.

=== ELMS and Blancpain (2017) ===
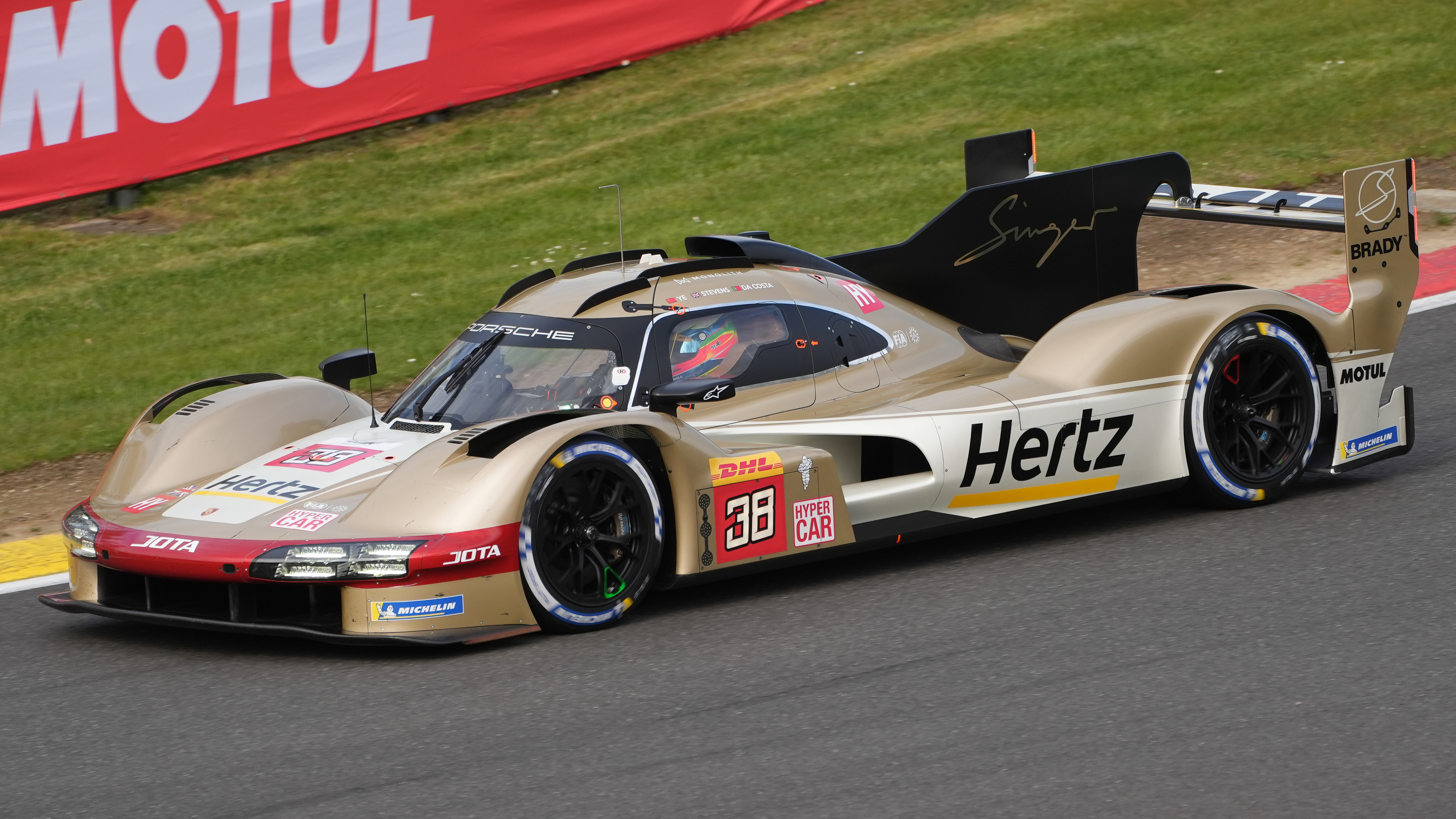
Stevens at the 2023 6 Hours of Spa-Francorchamps, the debut of Jota's Porsche 963.

Stevens also in 2017 finished second in the Blancpain GT Series Sprint Cup which included his first GT3 win at Zolder with team-mate Markus Winkelhock. Unfortunately he had a rather disappointing season in the Blancpain GT Series Endurance Cup where his car retired in every race he competed in and he wasn't involved in the 24 hours of Spa the blue riband event of the Blancpain GT Series.After their victory at the 24 hours of Le Mans, JMW Motorsport invited Stevens to race in the last two races of the European Le Man Series in an attempt to come first in the GTE Series Team standings. This attempt was successful, as Stevens helped the team come second at Spa-Francorchamps and Algarve which elevated the team to first in the GTE standings.

=== ELMS (2018–present) ===
In March 2018, Stevens joined the Panis-Barthez LMP2 Team for the 2018 European Le Mans Series and to compete in the 24 Hours of Le Mans.

=== McLaren F1 (2018–present) ===
Stevens has worked with McLaren since 2018 as a test and development driver, primarily carrying out simulator work. McLaren announced on 11 July 2022 that Stevens would drive the McLaren MCL35 2021 car at a private test to be held between 11 and 13 July at Portimao circuit.

== Racing record ==
=== Career summary ===
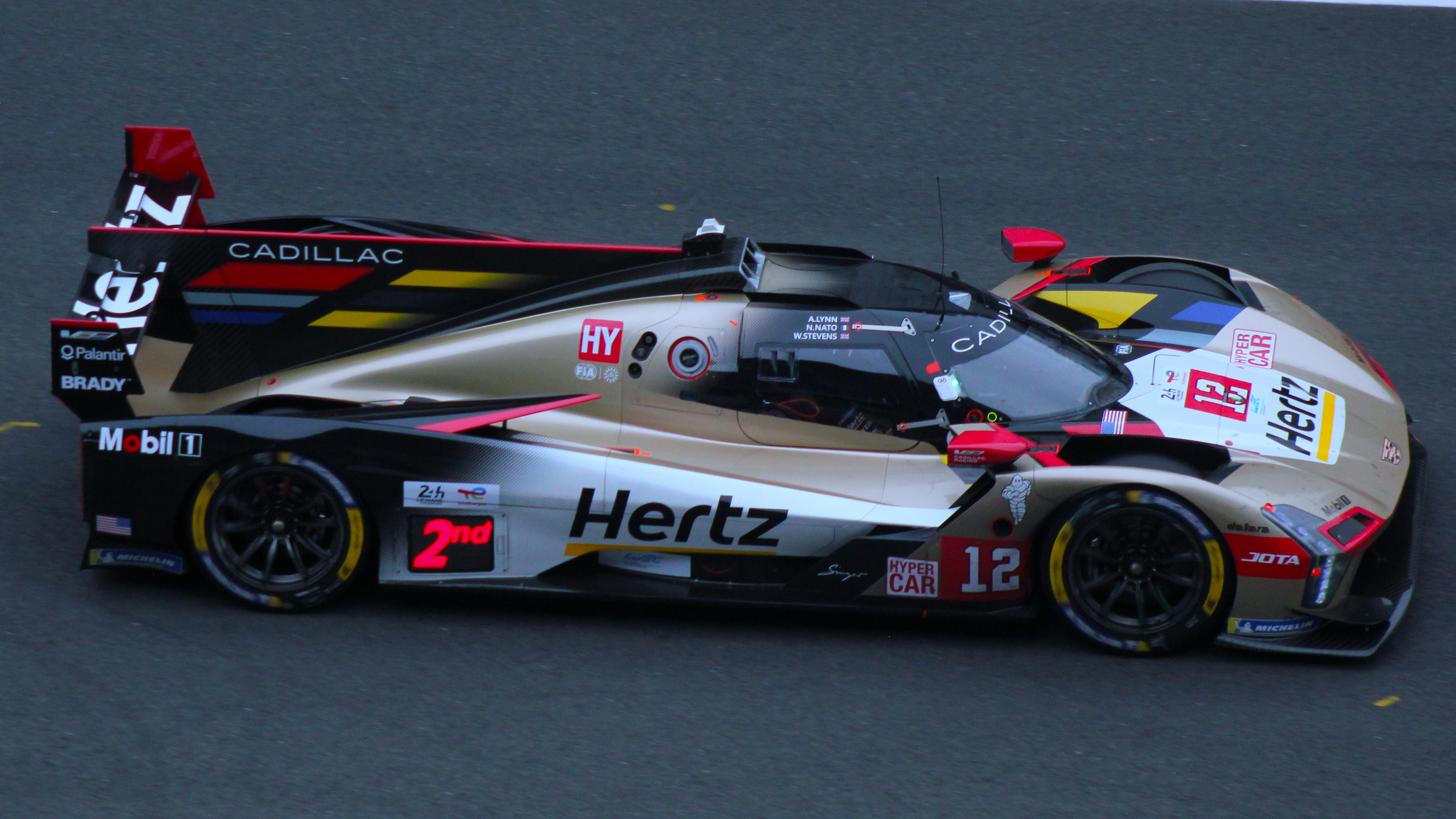
Stevens' No. 12 car at the 2025 24 Hours of Le Mans

Season	Series	Team	Races	Wins	Poles	FLaps	Podiums	Points	Position
2008	Formula Junior FR2.0 Portugal Winter Series	Fortec Motorsport	4	0	0	1	1	15	8th
2008	Formula Renault UK Winter Series	Fortec Motorsport	4	0	0	0	0	54	8th
2008–09	Toyota Racing Series	Giles Motorsport	9	0	1	0	5	491	9th
2009	Formula Renault UK	Fortec Motorsport	20	0	0	0	1	247	7th
2009	Eurocup Formula Renault 2.0	Fortec Motorsport	4	0	0	0	0	0	34th
2010	Formula Renault UK	Manor Competition	20	1	1	0	7	397	4th
2010	Eurocup Formula Renault 2.0	Manor Competition	2	0	0	0	1	N/A	NC†
2010	Formula Renault 2.0 NEC	MP Motorsport	3	1	1	0	1	58	17th
2011	Eurocup Formula Renault 2.0	Fortec Motorsport	14	1	3	0	4	116	4th
2011	Formula Renault UK	Fortec Motorsport	4	0	1	0	2	76	14th
2012	Formula Renault 3.5 Series	Carlin	17	0	0	0	1	59	12th
2013	Formula Renault 3.5 Series	P1 by Strakka Racing	17	0	0	2	5	148	4th
2013	Formula One	Caterham F1 Team	Test driver						
2014	Formula Renault 3.5 Series	Strakka Racing	17	2	1	0	4	122	6th
2014	Formula One	Caterham F1 Team	1	0	0	0	0	0	23rd
2015	Formula One	Manor Marussia F1 Team	19	0	0	0	0	0	21st
2016	FIA World Endurance Championship - LMP2	Manor	2	0	0	0	0	92	7th
2016	FIA World Endurance Championship - LMP2	G-Drive Racing	3	2	2	0	3	92	7th
2016	24 Hours of Le Mans - LMP2	G-Drive Racing	1	0	1	0	1	N/A	**2nd**
2016	Blancpain GT Series Sprint Cup	Belgian Audi Club Team WRT	8	0	0	0	3	39	9th
2016	Blancpain GT Series Endurance Cup	Belgian Audi Club Team WRT	5	0	0	0	0	19	18th
2016	European Le Mans Series - LMP2	Belgian Audi Club Team WRT	1	0	0	0	1	18	19th
2016	Intercontinental GT Challenge	Audi Sport Team WRT	1	0	0	0	0	4	16th
2017	Blancpain GT Series Sprint Cup	Belgian Audi Club Team WRT	9	1	0	0	4	74	**2nd**
2017	Blancpain GT Series Endurance Cup	Belgian Audi Club Team WRT	4	0	0	0	0	0	NC
2017	Blancpain GT Series Asia	Belgian Audi Club Team WRT	2	0	0	0	0	4	30th
2017	European Le Mans Series - LMGTE	JMW Motorsport	2	0	0	0	2	36	10th
2017	24 Hours of Le Mans - LMGTE Am	JMW Motorsport	1	1	0	0	1	N/A	**1st**
2017	Pirelli World Challenge	Absolute Racing	2	0	0	0	0	7	65th
2017	SprintX GT Championship Series	Absolute Racing	2	0	0	0	0	7	45th
2018	Blancpain GT Series Sprint Cup	Belgian Audi Club Team WRT	10	1	2	2	4	63.5	4th
2018	European Le Mans Series - LMP2	Panis Barthez Competition	6	0	1	0	2	45.5	9th
2018	24 Hours of Le Mans - LMP2	Panis Barthez Competition	1	0	0	0	0	N/A	9th
2018	Formula One	McLaren F1 Team	Development driver						
2018–19	FIA World Endurance Championship - LMP2	Jackie Chan DC Racing	2	1	0	0	1	40	11th
2019	European Le Mans Series - LMP2	Panis Barthez Competition	6	0	0	0	0	19.5	18th
2019	24 Hours of Le Mans - LMP2	Panis Barthez Competition	1	0	0	0	0	N/A	8th
2019	Formula One	McLaren F1 Team	Development driver						
2019–20	FIA World Endurance Championship - LMP2	Jackie Chan DC Racing	8	1	1	0	5	136	5th
2020	European Le Mans Series - LMP2	Panis Racing	5	0	0	0	1	47	4th
2020	Formula One	McLaren F1 Team	Test/Development driver						
2021	European Le Mans Series - LMP2	Panis Racing	6	1	0	0	3	74.5	**3rd**
2021	Formula One	McLaren F1 Team	Test/Development driver						
2022	FIA World Endurance Championship - LMP2	Jota	6	1	1	1	5	137	**1st**
2022	24 Hours of Le Mans - LMP2	Jota	1	1	0	0	1	N/A	**1st**
2022	IMSA SportsCar Championship - DPi	Konica Minolta Acura	2	0	1	0	1	665	14th
2022	IMSA SportsCar Championship - LMP2	Tower Motorsport	1	0	0	1	0	306	18th
2022	European Le Mans Series - LMP2	Racing Team Turkey	1	0	0	0	0	8	20th
2022	Formula One	McLaren F1 Team	Test/Development driver						
2023	FIA World Endurance Championship - Hypercar	Hertz Team Jota	5	0	0	0	0	38	9th
2023	FIA World Endurance Championship - LMP2	Hertz Team Jota	1	1	0	0	1	0	NC†
2023	24 Hours of Le Mans - Hypercar	Hertz Team Jota	1	0	0	0	0	N/A	13th
2023	IMSA SportsCar Championship - LMP2	Tower Motorsports	1	0	0	0	0	260	28th
2023	Formula One	McLaren F1 Team	Test/Development driver						
2023–24	Asian Le Mans Series - LMP2	Nielsen Racing	1	0	0	0	0	2	17th
2024	FIA World Endurance Championship - Hypercar	Hertz Team Jota	8	1	0	0	2	70	7th
2024	24 Hours of Le Mans - Hypercar	Hertz Team Jota	1	0	0	0	0	N/A	8th
2024	European Le Mans Series - LMP2	Nielsen Racing	6	0	0	0	0	1	21st
2024	Formula One	McLaren F1 Team	Test/Development driver						
2025	FIA World Endurance Championship – Hypercar	Cadillac Hertz Team Jota	8	1	3	2	1	93	4th
2025	24 Hours of Le Mans - Hypercar	Cadillac Hertz Team Jota	1	0	1	0	0	N/A	5th
2025	IMSA SportsCar Championship – GTP	Cadillac Wayne Taylor Racing	3	0	0	0	0	820	21st
2025	Formula One	McLaren F1 Team	Test/Development driver						
2026	FIA World Endurance Championship - Hypercar	Cadillac Hertz Team Jota	8	0	1	0	1	58	11th
2026	IMSA SportsCar Championship – GTP	Cadillac Wayne Taylor Racing	3	0	0	0	0	756	22nd
2026	Formula One	McLaren Mastercard F1 Team	Test/Simulator driver						

^{†} As Stevens was a guest driver, he was ineligible for points.

=== Complete Formula Renault UK results ===
(key) (Races in bold indicate pole position) (Races in italics indicate fastest lap)

Year	Entrant	1	2	3	4	5	6	7	8	9	10	11	12	13	14	15	16	17	18	19	20	21	Pos	Points
2009	Fortec Motorsport	BRI; 1; 9	BRI; 2; 8	THR; 1; 3	THR; 2; 21	DON; 1; 12	DON; 2; 11	OUL; 1; 8	OUL; 2; 12	CRO; 1; 7	CRO; 2; 5	SIL1; 1; 7	SIL1; 2; 6	SNE; 1; 20	SNE; 2; 7	SIL2; 1; 12	SIL2; 2; 10	ROC; 1; 7	ROC; 2; 7	BHGP; 1; 14	BHGP; 2; 12		7th	247
2010	Manor Competition	THR; 1; 2	**THR**; **2**; 1	ROC; 1; 5	ROC; 2; 3	BHGP; 1 C	BHGP; 2; 1	OUL; 1; 4	OUL; 2; 4	CRO; 1; 8	CRO; 2; 3	SNE; 1; 2	SNE; 2; 4	SIL1; 1; 2	SIL1; 2; 11	SIL1; 3; 4	KNO; 1; 8	KNO; 2; 10	SIL2; 1; 5	SIL2; 2; 5	BRI; 1; 9	BRI; 2; 11	4th	397
2011	Fortec Motorsports	BRI; 1; 2	BRI; 2; 5	DON; 1	DON; 2	THR; 1	THR; 2	OUL; 1	OUL; 2	CRO; 1	CRO; 2	SNE; 1 Ret	SNE; 2; 2	SIL1; 1	SIL1; 2	ROC; 1	ROC; 2	BHGP; 1	BHGP; 2	SIL2; 1	SIL2; 2		14th	76

=== Complete Eurocup Formula Renault 2.0 results ===
(key) (Races in bold indicate pole position) (Races in italics indicate fastest lap)

Year	Entrant	1	2	3	4	5	6	7	8	9	10	11	12	13	14	15	16	Pos	Points
2009	Fortec Motorsport	CAT; 1	CAT; 2	SPA; 1; 24	SPA; 2; 22	HUN; 1	HUN; 2	SIL; 1	SIL; 2	LMS; 1; 16	LMS; 2; 15	NÜR; 1	NÜR; 2	ALC; 1	ALC; 2			34th	0
2010	Manor Competition	ALC; 1	ALC; 2	SPA; 1	SPA; 2	BRN; 1	BRN; 2	MAG; 1	MAG; 2	HUN; 1; 2	HUN; 2; 4	HOC; 1	HOC; 2	SIL; 1	SIL; 2	CAT; 1	CAT; 2	NC†	0
2011	Fortec Motorsport	**ALC**; **1** Ret	**ALC**; **2**; 1	SPA; 1; 2	SPA; 2; 2	**NÜR**; **1**; 4	NÜR; 2; 10	HUN; 1; 10	HUN; 2; 13	SIL; 1; 3	SIL; 2; 8	LEC; 1; 5	LEC; 2; 12	CAT; 1; 7	CAT; 2; 7			4th	116

^{†} As Stevens was a guest driver, he was ineligible for points.

=== Complete Formula Renault 2.0 NEC results ===
(key) (Races in bold indicate pole position) (Races in italics indicate fastest lap)

Year	Entrant	1	2	3	4	5	6	7	8	9	10	11	12	13	14	15	16	17	18	19	20	DC	Points
2010	MP Motorsport	HOC; 1	HOC; 2	BRN; 1	BRN; 2	ZAN; 1	ZAN; 2	OSC; 1	OSC; 2	OSC; 3	ASS; 1	ASS; 2	MST; 1	MST; 2	MST; 3	SPA; 1; 9	SPA; 2; 1	SPA; 3; 6	NÜR; 1	NÜR; 2	NÜR; 3	17th	58
2011	Fortec Motorsport	HOC; 1	HOC; 2	HOC; 3	SPA; 1; 2	SPA; 2; 2	NÜR; 1	NÜR; 2	ASS; 1	ASS; 2	ASS; 3	OSC; 1	OSC; 2	ZAN; 1	ZAN; 2	MST; 1	MST; 2	MST; 3	MNZ; 1	MNZ; 2	MNZ; 3	NC†	0

† As Stevens was a guest driver, he was ineligible for points

=== Complete Formula Renault 3.5 Series results ===
(key) (Races in bold indicate pole position) (Races in italics indicate fastest lap)

Year	Team	1	2	3	4	5	6	7	8	9	10	11	12	13	14	15	16	17	Pos	Points
2012	Carlin	ALC; 1; 6	ALC; 2; 8	MON; 1; 12	SPA; 1; 13	SPA; 2; 8	NÜR; 1; 10	NÜR; 2; 13	MSC; 1; 10	MSC; 2; 8	SIL; 1 Ret	SIL; 2; 6	HUN; 1; 23	HUN; 2; 3	LEC; 1; 11	LEC; 2; 11	CAT; 1; 4	CAT; 2; 9	12th	59
2013	P1 Motorsport	MNZ; 1; 18	MNZ; 2 Ret	ALC; 1; 2	ALC; 2; 4	MON; 1; 7	SPA; 1 Ret	SPA; 2; 2	MSC; 1; 4	MSC; 2; 3	RBR; 1; 4	RBR; 2; 6	HUN; 1; 8	HUN; 2 Ret	LEC; 1; 5	LEC; 2; 13	CAT; 1; 2	CAT; 2; 3	4th	148
2014	Strakka Racing	MNZ; 1; 1	MNZ; 2 Ret	ALC; 1; 12	ALC; 2; 3	MON; 1; 8	SPA; 1; 7	SPA; 2; 2	MSC; 1; 6	MSC; 2; 9	NÜR; 1; 11	NÜR; 2; 7	HUN; 1; 6	HUN; 2; 10	LEC; 1; 12	LEC; 2; 8	**JER**; **1**; 1	JER; 2; 13	6th	122

=== Complete Formula One results ===
(key) (Races in bold indicate pole position; races in italics indicate fastest lap)

Year	Entrant	Chassis	Engine	1	2	3	4	5	6	7	8	9	10	11	12	13	14	15	16	17	18	19	WDC	Points
2014	Caterham F1 Team	Caterham CT05	Renault Energy F1‑2014 1.6 V6 t	AUS	MAL	BHR	CHN	ESP	MON	CAN	AUT	GBR	GER	HUN	BEL	ITA	SIN	JPN	RUS	USA	BRA	ABU; 17	23rd	0
2015	Manor Marussia F1 Team	Marussia MR03B	Ferrari 059/3 1.6 V6 t	AUS; DNP	MAL; DNS	CHN; 15	BHR; 16	ESP; 17	MON; 17	CAN; 17	AUT; Ret	GBR; 13	HUN; 16^{†}	BEL; 16	ITA; 15	SIN; 15	JPN; 19	RUS; 14	USA; Ret	MEX; 16	BRA; 17	ABU; 18	21st	0

^{†} Driver did not finish the Grand Prix, but was classified as he completed over 90% of the race distance.

=== Complete FIA World Endurance Championship results ===
Year	Entrant	Class	Car	Engine	1	2	3	4	5	6	7	8	9	Rank	Points
2016	Manor	LMP2	Oreca 05	Nissan VK45DE 4.5 L V8	SIL; Ret	SPA; 8								7th	92
2016	G-Drive Racing	LMP2	Oreca 05	Nissan VK45DE 4.5 L V8			**LMS**; 2	NÜR	MEX	COA	**FUJ**; 1	SHA; 1	BHR	7th	92
2017	JMW Motorsport	LMGTE AM	Ferrari 488 GTE	Ferrari F154CB 3.9 L Turbo V8	SIL	SPA	LMS; 1	NÜR	MEX	COA	FUJ	SHA	BHR	0	0
2018–19	Jackie Chan DC Racing	LMP2	Oreca 07	Gibson GK428 4.2 L V8	SPA	LMS	SIL	FUJ	SHA	SEB; 1	SPA; 6	LMS		11th	40
2019–20	Jackie Chan DC Racing	LMP2	Oreca 07	Gibson GK428 4.2 L V8	SIL; 4	**FUJ**; 2	SHA; 2	BHR; 3	COA; 2	SPA; 6	LMS; DSQ	BHR; 1		5th	136
2022	Jota	LMP2	Oreca 07	Gibson GK428 4.2 L V8	SEB; 6	SPA; 3	LMS; 1	MNZ; 2	**FUJ**; 2	BHR; 3				1st	137
2023	Hertz Team Jota	Hypercar	Porsche 963	Porsche 4.6 L Turbo V8	SEB	ALG	SPA; 6	LMS; 10	MNZ; 9	FUJ; 6	BHR; 4			9th	38
2024	Hertz Team Jota	Hypercar	Porsche 963	Porsche 9RD 4.6 L Turbo V8	QAT; 2	IMO; 14	SPA; 1	LMS; 8	SÃO; 18	COA; Ret	FUJ; 5	BHR; 13		7th	70
2025	Cadillac Hertz Team Jota	Hypercar	Cadillac V-Series.R	Cadillac LMC55R 5.5 L V8	QAT; 8	IMO; 10	SPA; 5	**LMS**; 4	**SÃO**; 1	COA; 8	**FUJ**; 6	BHR; 6		5th	93
2026	Cadillac Hertz Team Jota	Hypercar	Cadillac V-Series.R	Cadillac LMC55R 5.5 L V8	IMO; 13	SPA; 9	LMS; 4	**SÃO**; 3	COA; 9	FUJ; 7	CAT; 6	MNZ; Ret		11th	58

=== Complete 24 Hours of Le Mans results ===
Year	Team	Co-Drivers	Car	Class	Laps	Pos.	Class Pos.
2016	(Russia) G-Drive Racing	(Germany) René Rast (Russia) Roman Rusinov	Oreca 05-Nissan	LMP2	357	6th	**2nd**
2017	(United Kingdom) JMW Motorsport	(United Kingdom) Robert Smith (Belgium) Dries Vanthoor	Ferrari 488 GTE	GTE; Am	333	26th	**1st**
2018	(France) Panis Barthez Competition	(France) Julien Canal (France) Timothé Buret	Ligier JS P217-Gibson	LMP2	352	13th	9th
2019	(France) Panis Barthez Competition	(France) Julien Canal (Austria) René Binder	Ligier JS P217-Gibson	LMP2	362	13th	8th
2020	(China) Jackie Chan DC Racing	(China) Ho-Pin Tung (France) Gabriel Aubry	Oreca 07-Gibson	LMP2	141	DSQ	DSQ
2021	(France) Panis Racing	(Australia) James Allen (France) Julien Canal	Oreca 07-Gibson	LMP2	362	8th	**3rd**
2022	(United Kingdom) Jota Sport	(Portugal) António Félix da Costa (Mexico) Roberto González	Oreca 07-Gibson	LMP2	369	5th	**1st**
2023	(United Kingdom) Hertz Team Jota	(Portugal) António Félix da Costa (China) Yifei Ye	Porsche 963	Hypercar	244	40th	13th
2024	(United Kingdom) Hertz Team Jota	(United Kingdom) Callum Ilott (France) Norman Nato	Porsche 963	Hypercar	311	8th	8th
2025	(United States) Cadillac Hertz Team Jota	(United Kingdom) Alex Lynn (France) Norman Nato	Cadillac V-Series.R	Hypercar	387	4th	4th
2026	(United States) Cadillac Hertz Team Jota	(Switzerland) Louis Delétraz (France) Norman Nato	Cadillac V-Series.R	Hypercar	381	4th	4th

=== Complete Blancpain GT Series Sprint Cup results ===
Year	Team	Car	Class	1	2	3	4	5	6	7	8	9	10	Pos.	Points
2016	Belgian Audi Club Team WRT	Audi R8 LMS	Pro	MIS; QR; 14	MIS; CR; Ret	BRH; QR	BRH; CR	NÜR; QR; 3	NÜR; CR; 2	HUN; QR; 10	HUN; CR; 3	CAT; QR; 5	CAT; CR; 18	9th	39
2017	Belgian Audi Club Team WRT	Audi R8 LMS	Pro	MIS; QR; Ret	MIS; CR; DNS	BRH; QR; 11	BRH; CR; 3	ZOL; QR; 3	ZOL; CR; 1	HUN; QR; 7	HUN; CR; 5	NÜR; QR; 5	NÜR; CR; 2	2nd	74
2018	Belgian Audi Club Team WRT	Audi R8 LMS	Pro	**ZOL**; **1**; 2	ZOL; 2; 11	**BRH**; **1**; 1	BRH; 2 Ret	MIS; 1 Ret	MIS; 2; 2	HUN; 1; 5	HUN; 2; 7	NÜR; 1; 2	NÜR; 2 Ret	4th	63.5

=== Complete European Le Mans Series results ===
Year	Entrant	Class	Chassis	Engine	1	2	3	4	5	6	Rank	Points
2016	Team WRT	LMP2	Ligier JS P2	Judd HK 3.6 L V8	SIL	IMO	RBR	LEC	SPA; 2	EST	19th	18
2017	JMW Motorsport	LMGTE	Ferrari 488 GTE	Ferrari F154CB 3.9 L Turbo V8	SIL	MNZ	RBR	LEC	SPA; 2	ALG; 2	10th	36
2018	Panis Barthez Competition	LMP2	Ligier JS P217	Gibson GK428 4.2 L V8	LEC; 8	MNZ; 7	RBR; 10	**SIL**; 6	SPA; 3‡	ALG; 2	9th	45.5
2019	Panis Barthez Competition	LMP2	Ligier JS P217	Gibson GK428 4.2 L V8	LEC; 10	MNZ; 9	CAT; 15	SIL; 7	SPA; 8	ALG; 7	18th	19.5
2020	Panis Racing	LMP2	Oreca 07	Gibson GK428 4.2 L V8	LEC; Ret	SPA; 3	LEC; 4	MNZ; 5	ALG; 5		4th	47
2021	Panis Racing	LMP2	Oreca 07	Gibson GK428 4.2 L V8	CAT; 2	RBR; 14	LEC; 8	MNZ; 1	SPA; 3	ALG; 4	3rd	74.5
2022	Racing Team Turkey	LMP2	Oreca 07	Gibson GK428 4.2 L V8	LEC	IMO	MNZ	CAT	SPA; 6	ALG	20th	8
2024	Nielsen Racing	LMP2	Oreca 07	Gibson GK428 4.2 L V8	CAT; 13	LEC; 11	IMO; 12	SPA; 13	MUG; 10	ALG; 11	21st	1

^{‡} Half points awarded as less than 75% of race distance was completed.

=== Complete IMSA SportsCar Championship results ===
(key)

Year	Entrant	Class	Make	Engine	1	2	3	4	5	6	7	8	9	10	Rank	Points
2022	Konica Minolta Acura	DPi	Acura ARX-05	Acura AR35TT 3.5 L Turbo V6	**DAY**; 2	SEB; 4	LBH	LGA		DET	WGL	MOS	ELK	PET	14th	665
2022	Tower Motorsport	LMP2	Oreca 07	Gibson GK428 4.2 L V8					MDO; 4						18th	306
2023	Tower Motorsport	LMP2	Oreca 07	Gibson GK428 4.2 L V8	DAY	SEB	LGA	WGL; 5	ELK	IMS	PET				28th	260
2025	Cadillac Wayne Taylor Racing	GTP	Cadillac V-Series.R	Cadillac LMC55R 5.5 L V8	DAY; 5	SEB; 7	LBH	LGA	DET	WGL	ELK	IMS	PET; 6		21st	820
2026	Cadillac Wayne Taylor Racing	GTP	Cadillac V-Series.R	Cadillac LMC55R 5.5 L V8	DAY; 11	SEB; 11	LBH	LGA	DET	WGL	ELK	IMS	PET; 4		22nd	756

== Notes ==
Sporting positions
Preceded by Robin Frijns; Ferdinand Habsburg; Charles Milesi	FIA Endurance Trophy for LMP2 Drivers; 2022; With: António Félix da Costa & Roberto González	Succeeded by Robert Kubica; Louis Delétraz; Rui Andrade
