= Sven Heidfeld =

German racing driver (born 1978)

- Nationality: (Germany) German
- Born: 25 October 1978 (age 48) Mönchengladbach (West Germany)
- Relatives: Nick Heidfeld (brother)

Sven Heidfeld (born 25 October 1978 in Mönchengladbach, West Germany) is a former auto racing driver. He currently works as a motorsport commentator for the television broadcaster Sky Deutschland. He is the younger brother of the former Formula One driver Nick Heidfeld.

== Career ==
His motor racing career included the following achievements:

- 1988–1996: Karting
- 1999: 11th German Formula Three Championship
- 2000: 9th German Formula Three Championship
- 2001: German Formula Three Championship, 3rd Formula Chrysler Euroseries
- 2002: 16th German Formula Three Championship
- 2003: 11th Euro Formula 3000
- 2004: Euro Formula 3000 (2 races)
- 2005: German Porsche Carrera Cup

=== Complete Euro Formula 3000 results ===
(key) (Races in bold indicate pole position; races in italics indicate fastest lap)

Year	Entrant	1	2	3	4	5	6	7	8	9	10	DC	Points
2003	Draco Junior Team	NÜR; Ret	MAG; 8	PER; 7	MOZ; Ret	SPA; Ret	DON; 8	BRN; 7	JER; 3	CAG; Ret		11th	4
2004	Zele Racing	BRN; 8	EST; Ret	JER	MOZ	SPA	DON	DIJ	ZOL	NÜR1	NÜR2	17th	0
