= Roberto González (racing driver) =

Mexican racing driver

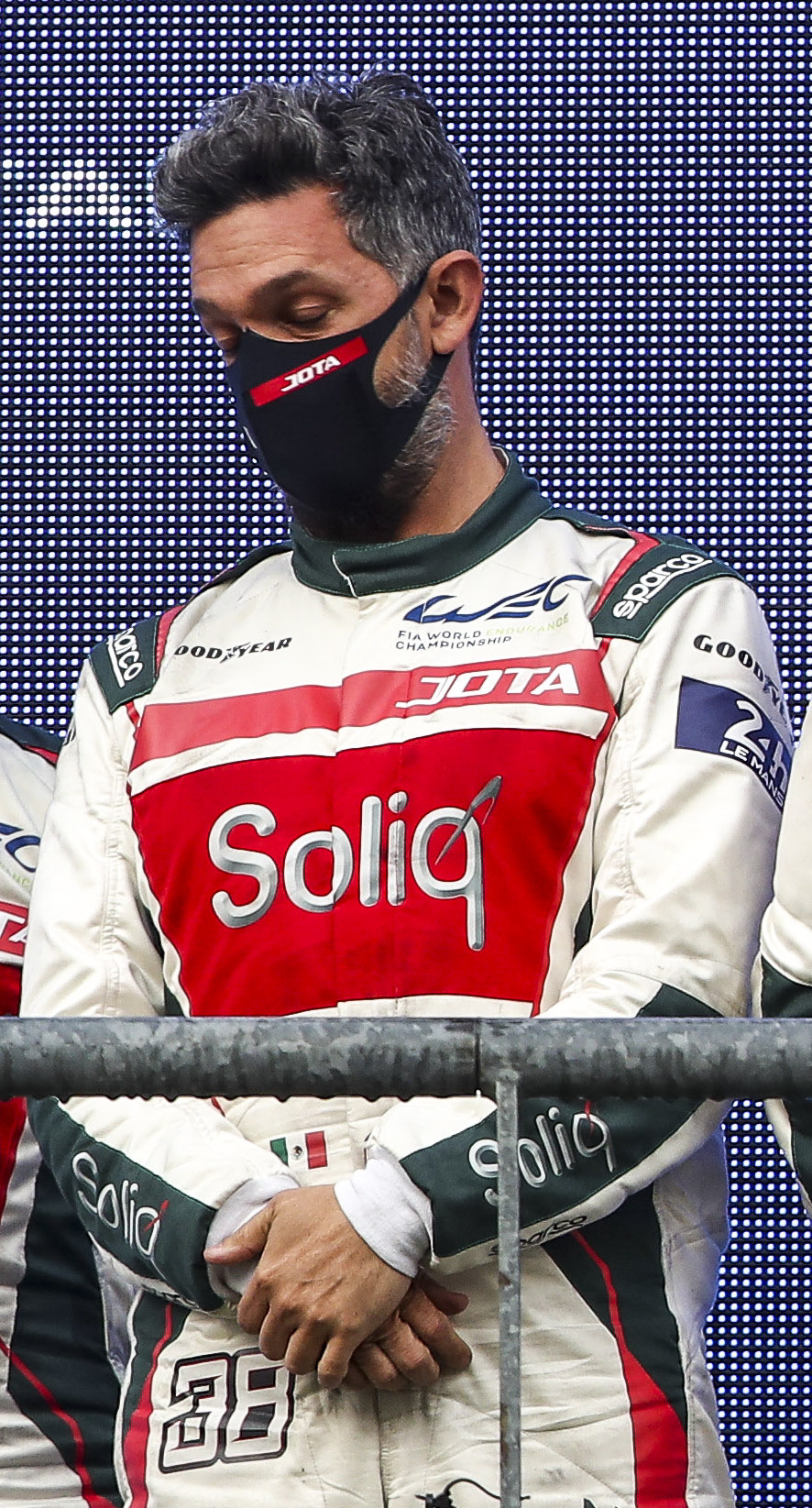
- González in 2021
- Nationality: Mexican
- Born: 31 March 1976 (age 50) Monterrey, Mexico
- Relatives: Ricardo González (brother)

FIA World Endurance Championship career
- Current team: Jota Sport
- Categorisation: FIA Silver
- Car number: 38
- Former teams: CEFC Manor TRS Racing; DragonSpeed
24 Hours of Le Mans career
- Years: 2017, 2018, 2019, 2020, 2021,2022
- Teams: CEFC Manor TRS Racing; DragonSpeed; Jota Sport
- Best finish: 5th (2022)
- Class wins: 1 LMP2 (2022)

Roberto González Valdés (born March 31, 1976, in Mexico City) is a Mexican racing driver from Monterrey. He competed in Champ Car in the 2003 season and for all of 2004. In 2003, he made his debut in the race at St. Petersburg in Florida for Dale Coyne Racing failing to complete the race. His other appearance in 2003 was at home in Mexico City where he substituted for veteran Roberto Moreno scoring his first Champ Car points in tenth spot.

González was given a full-time ride with PKV Racing for the 2004 season complete with backing from the Mexican arm of Nextel. However, he had a disappointing year with a best result of seventh place in Cleveland highlighting a year where he only finished 15th in the points standings. He was not retained for the 2005 season.

In 2012, González drove in three races for RSR Racing in the American Le Mans Series.

In 2013, González's younger brother Ricardo won the 81st edition of the 24 Hours of Le Mans in LMP2. In 2019, Roberto went on to win the 24 Hours of Daytona and the 6 Hours of Spa-Francorchamps, both in the LMP2 class.

In the 90th edition of the 2022 24 Hours of Le Mans, González obtained the first position in the LMP2 class after six attempts. He teamed up with Will Stevens and António Félix da Costa. They would all later win the 2022 FIA World Endurance Championship for LMP2.

González is also the founder of Mexican investment management company Soliq. González also serves as a board member of EPM, a cannabis-based drug development company, founded by Reshef Swisa, which sought to go public on the Israeli Stock Market, by attempting to raise NIS 44 million (at a pre-money valuation of NIS 381 million) through crowdfunding website Fundit.

EPM's offering to sell securities had been accompanied by an aggressive television campaign in Israel.

It was published that the Israel Securities Authority (ISA) formed the impression that the television campaign advertisements were not formulated with due care and were misleading investors. On June 1, 2022, it was announced that the board of directors of EPM decided to positively consider accepting alternative offers and to cancel the IPO, noting that all funds transferred by potential IPO investors, totaling NIS 26 million, were to be refunded without interest.

== Racing record ==
=== Racing career summary ===
Season	Series	Team	Races	Wins	Poles	F/Laps	Podiums	Points	Position
1995	Formula 3 Mexico	Acero Solar	?	?	?	?	?	0	?
1998	Indy Lights Panamericana	N/A	1	0	0	0	0	10	16th
2001	Formula Chrysler Euroseries	Alpie Motorsport	7	2	1	0	6	106	2nd
2002	World Series by Nissan	GD Racing	17	0	0	0	0	7	22nd
2003	Champ Car World Series	Dale Coyne Racing	1	0	0	0	0	3	24th
2003	Champ Car World Series	Herdez Competition	1	0	0	0	0	3	24th
2004	Champ Car World Series	PKV Racing	14	0	0	0	0	136	15th
2012	FIA World Endurance Championship - LMP2	Greaves Motorsport	1	0	0	0	0	0	NC†
2012	American Le Mans Series - LMPC	RSR Racing	3	0	0	0	1	38	13th
2016	FIA World Endurance Championship	Manor	2	0	0	0	0	6	45th
2017	FIA World Endurance Championship - LMP2	CEFC Manor TRS Racing	9	0	0	0	0	46	18th
2017	24 Hours of Le Mans - LMP2	CEFC Manor TRS Racing	1	0	0	0	0	N/A	DNF
2018	IMSA SportsCar Championship - DPi	AFS/PR1 Mathiasen Motorsports	2	0	0	0	0	39	43rd
2018	24 Hours of Le Mans - LMP2	DragonSpeed	1	0	0	0	0	N/A	5th
2018–19	FIA World Endurance Championship - LMP2	DragonSpeed	8	1	1	0	3	117	3rd
2019	24 Hours of Le Mans - LMP2	DragonSpeed	1	0	0	0	0	N/A	DNF
2019	IMSA SportsCar Championship - LMP2	DragonSpeed	1	1	0	0	1	35	8th
2019–20	FIA World Endurance Championship - LMP2	Jota Sport	8	1	0	0	5	152	3rd
2020	24 Hours of Le Mans - LMP2	Jota Sport	1	0	0	0	1	N/A	2nd
2020	European Le Mans Series - LMP2	Jota Sport	1	0	0	0	0	0	NC†
2021	FIA World Endurance Championship - LMP2	Jota Sport	6	1	0	0	4	79	3rd
2021	24 Hours of Le Mans - LMP2	Jota Sport	1	0	0	0	0	N/A	8th
2022	FIA World Endurance Championship - LMP2	Jota Sport	6	1	0	0	5	137	1st
2022	24 Hours of Le Mans - LMP2	Jota Sport	1	1	0	0	1	N/A	1st

† As González was a guest driver, he was ineligible to score championship points.

=== Complete American Open-Wheel Racing results ===
(key)

==== CART/Champ Car World Series ====
Year	Team	No.	Chassis	Engine	1	2	3	4	5	6	7	8	9	10	11	12	13	14	15	16	17	18	19	Rank	Points	Ref
2003	Dale Coyne Racing	11	Lola B02/00	Ford XFE V8t	STP; 17	MTY	LBH	BRH	LAU	MIL	LS	POR	CLE	TOR	VAN	ROA	MDO	MTL	DEN	MIA				24th	3	
2003	Herdez Competition	4	Lola B02/00	Ford XFE V8t																	MXC; 10	SRF	FON	24th	3	
2004	PKV Racing	21	Lola B02/00	Ford XFE V8t	LBH; 14	MTY; 9	MIL; 12	POR; 10	CLE; 7	TOR; 13	VAN; 13	ROA; 16	DEN; 12	MTL; 10	LS; 14	LVS; 10	SRF; 11	MXC; 12						15th	136^	

- ^ New points system implemented in 2004

=== Complete FIA World Endurance Championship results ===
Year	Entrant	Class	Car	Engine	1	2	3	4	5	6	7	8	9	Rank	Points
2016	Manor	LMP2	Oreca 05	Nissan VK45DE 4.5 L V8	SIL	SPA	LMS	NÜR	MEX	COA	FUJ	SHA; Ret	BHR; 7	45th	6
2017	CEFC Manor TRS Racing	LMP2	Oreca 07	Gibson GK428 4.2 L V8	SIL; 7	SPA; 8	LMS; Ret	NÜR; 7	MEX; 8	COA; Ret	FUJ; 7	SHA; 5	BHR; 5	18th	46
2018–19	DragonSpeed	LMP2	Oreca 07	Gibson GK428 4.2 L V8	SPA; 5	LMS; 3	SIL; 4	FUJ; 6	SHA; 2	SEB; 3	SPA; 1	LMS; Ret		3rd	117
2019–20	Jota Sport	LMP2	Oreca 07	Gibson GK428 4.2 L V8	SIL; 5	FUJ; DSQ	SHA; 1	BHR; 2	COA; 3	SPA; 4	LMS; 2	BHR; 2		3rd	152
2021	Jota Sport	LMP2	Oreca 07	Gibson GK428 4.2 L V8	SPA; 2	ALG; 1	MNZ; Ret	LMS; 4	BHR; 3	BHR; 2				3rd	123
2022	Jota Sport	LMP2	Oreca 07	Gibson GK428 4.2 L V8	SEB; 6	SPA; 3	LMS; 1	MNZ; 2	FUJ; 2	BHR; 3				1st	137

^{*} Season still in progress.

=== 24 Hours of Le Mans results ===
Year	Team	Co-Drivers	Car	Class	Laps	Pos.	Class Pos.
2017	(China) CEFC Manor TRS Racing	(Russia) Vitaly Petrov (Switzerland) Simon Trummer	Oreca 07-Gibson	LMP2	152	DNF	DNF
2018	(United States) DragonSpeed	(Venezuela) Pastor Maldonado (France) Nathanaël Berthon	Oreca 07-Gibson	LMP2	360	9th	5th
2019	(United States) DragonSpeed	(Venezuela) Pastor Maldonado (United Kingdom) Anthony Davidson	Oreca 07-Gibson	LMP2	245	DNF	DNF
2020	(United Kingdom) Jota Sport	(Portugal) António Félix da Costa (United Kingdom) Anthony Davidson	Oreca 07-Gibson	LMP2	370	6th	2nd
2021	(United Kingdom) Jota Sport	(Portugal) António Félix da Costa (United Kingdom) Anthony Davidson	Oreca 07-Gibson	LMP2	358	13th	8th
2022	(United Kingdom) Jota Sport	(Portugal) António Félix da Costa (United Kingdom) Will Stevens	Oreca 07-Gibson	LMP2	369	5th	1st

=== Complete WeatherTech SportsCar Championship ===
Year	Entrant	Class	Chassis	Engine	1	2	3	4	5	6	7	8	9	10	Rank	Points
2018	AFS/PR1 Mathiasen Motorsports	P	Ligier JS P217	Gibson GK428 4.2 L V8	DAY; 12	SEB; 11	LBH	MDO	DET	WGL	MOS	ELK	LGA	PET	43rd	39

Sporting positions
Preceded by Robin Frijns; Ferdinand Habsburg; Charles Milesi	FIA Endurance Trophy for LMP2 Drivers; 2022; With: António Félix da Costa & Will Stevens	Succeeded by Robert Kubica; Louis Delétraz; Rui Andrade
