= William Stephens (botanist) =

William Stephens FRS (1696–1761) was an Irish physician and botanist, and the second lecturer in botany at Trinity College Dublin. He is a Fellow of the royal society, and his is tenure saw significant contributions to the university’s Physic Garden, including the compilation of a detailed plant catalog and the publication of botanical lecture notes for students.

== Early life and education ==
Born in 1696, Stephens was educated in Dublin before studying natural philosophy at the University of Glasgow in 1715. He then moved to Leiden University, a leading center for medical and botanical studies, where he earned his medical doctorate on 15 July 1718. Upon returning to Dublin, he received both Bachelor and Doctor of Medicine degrees from TCD in 1724.

== Career and achievements ==
Stephens was appointed lecturer in botany at TCD, likely in 1724 or 1725, succeeding Henry Nicholson. His most notable contributions include:

- Catalog of the Physic Garden (1726): A detailed record of over 500 plant species, presented to the Botanical Society of London on 22 October 1726.
- Botanical Elements (1727): Published lecture notes intended to aid students, as Stephens noted it was "impossible to expect that they should acquire a distinct and permanent knowledge of botany by a bare attendance upon one lecture."

Stephens was elected a Fellow of Trinity College Dublin in 1728, having already become a Fellow of the Royal Society in 1718.

== Later life and legacy ==
In 1733, Stephens succeeded William Smyth as lecturer in chemistry, ending his formal role in botany. He continued his academic work until his death in 1761. His contributions helped sustain Trinity’s early botanical studies, bridging the gap between Nicholson’s foundational work and later developments in the field.
