= Henry Nicholson (botanist) =

Henry Nicholson FRS (c. 1681–1715/1721) was an Irish botanist, physician, fellow of the Royal Society and scholar, best known as Trinity College Dublin's first appointed botanist. He played a key role in establishing the college's Physic Garden and contributed to early botanical classification.

== Early life and education ==
Born in Castlerea, County Roscommon, Nicholson was the son of Reverend Edward Nicholson. He entered Trinity College Dublin in 1700 but did not graduate there, instead matriculating at University College, Oxford in 1705/6. He earned his medical doctorate from Leiden University in 1709 with his thesis A Brief Treatise of the Anatomy of Humane Bodies.

Before his botanical career, Nicholson wrote religious works including A Conference Between the Soul and Body (1705) and a 1708 pamphlet denouncing a fringe religious group he had briefly associated with.

== Career and achievements ==
Appointed Trinity's Lecturer in Botany in 1711, Nicholson worked to develop the Physic Garden, corresponding extensively with London apothecary James Petiver about plant acquisitions. In 1712 he published METHODUS PLANTARUM, a catalog of 397 species intended for the garden.

His correspondence reveals challenges including funding delays and lack of institutional support. By 1713 he lamented that "Our gentlemen here give little encouragement towards the improvement of Botany."

== Later life and legacy ==
Nicholson left Dublin in 1715 to study law at London's Middle Temple. He became a Fellow of the Royal Society in 1716 but died shortly after (sources differ on exact date). While his Physic Garden may not have fully materialized, his work laid foundations for botanical studies at Trinity College Dublin.
