= 2023 6 Hours of Spa-Francorchamps =

Endurance sports car racing

(Belgium) 2023 TotalEnergies 6 Hours of Spa-Francorchamps
Event information
- Round 3 of 7 in the 2023 FIA World Endurance Championship
- Date: 29 April 2023
- Location: Stavelot, Belgium
- Venue: Circuit de Spa-Francorchamps
- Duration: 6 hours

Results
- Laps completed: 148
- Distance (km): 1036.592
- Distance (miles): 644.096
- Hypercar

Pole position
- Time: 2:00.812
- Team: Toyota Gazoo Racing
- Drivers: (Japan) Kamui Kobayashi

Winners
- Team: Toyota Gazoo Racing
- Drivers: (United Kingdom) Mike Conway (Japan) Kamui Kobayashi (Argentina) José María López
- LMP2

Winners
- Team: (Belgium) WRT
- Drivers: (Angola) Rui Andrade (Switzerland) Louis Delétraz (Poland) Robert Kubica
- LMGTE Am

Winners
- Team: (Italy) Richard Mille AF Corse
- Drivers: (Argentina) Luis Pérez Companc (Italy) Alessio Rovera (France) Lilou Wadoux

The 2023 TotalEnergies 6 Hours of Spa-Francorchamps was an endurance sports car racing event held at the Circuit de Spa-Francorchamps, Stavelot, Belgium, held on 29 April 2023. It was the third round of the 2023 FIA World Endurance Championship, and the twelfth running of the event as part of the championship.

Lilou Wadoux became the first female driver to win an FIA World Endurance Championship race, taking victory in the LMGTE Am class with Luís Pérez Companc and Alessio Rovera.

== Background ==
The provisional calendar for the 2023 FIA World Endurance Championship released in September 2022. It brought back the Portimaõ race at Autodromo Internacional Algarve for 16 April, leaving only a two-week gap between the previous race at Portimaõ, and the race at Spa.

== Entry list ==
The provisional entry list was revealed on 29 March 2023. The entry list consisted of a record 13 Hypercar entries, 11 LMP2 entries and 14 LMGTE Am entries. Hertz Team Jota entered the Hypercar class with their customer Porsche 963 for the first time this season, meaning they will only run the No. 28 car in LMP2 for the remainder of the season. Cadillac Racing also entered an additional car for this race. There were no changes in entries in the LMGTE Am category.

On 24 April 2023, Paul Dalla Lana announced he retired from racing effective immediately. Ian James' Heart of Racing Team has taken over the NorthWest AMR entry. Ian James, Daniel Mancinelli and Alex Riberas will drive the No. 98 Aston Martin Vantage AMR during the season. Conforming with championship regulations, the team will keep competing under the NorthWest AMR banner.

== Schedule ==
Date	Time (local: CEST)	Event
Thursday, 27 April	11:30	Free Practice 1
Thursday, 27 April	16:20	Free Practice 2
Friday, 28 April	11:00	Free Practice 3
Friday, 28 April	17:00	Qualifying - LMGTE Am
Friday, 28 April	17:25	Qualifying - LMP2
Friday, 28 April	17:50	Qualifying - Hypercar
Saturday, 29 April	12:45	Race

== Free practice ==
- Only the fastest car in each class is shown.

Free Practice 1	Class	No.	Entrant	Driver	Time
Free Practice 1	Hypercar	8	(Japan) Toyota Gazoo Racing	(Switzerland) Sébastien Buemi	2:02.982
Free Practice 1	LMP2	22	(United Kingdom) United Autosports	(Portugal) Filipe Albuquerque	2:07.471
Free Practice 1	LMGTE Am	57	(Switzerland) Kessel Racing	(Brazil) Daniel Serra	2:16.177
Free Practice 2	Class	No.	Entrant	Driver	Time
Free Practice 2	Hypercar	51	(Italy) Ferrari AF Corse	(Italy) Antonio Giovinazzi	2:01.871
Free Practice 2	LMP2	31	(Belgium) Team WRT	(Netherlands) Robin Frijns	2:06.108
Free Practice 2	LMGTE Am	54	(Italy) AF Corse	(Italy) Davide Rigon	2:15.736
Free Practice 3	Class	No.	Entrant	Driver	Time
Free Practice 3	Hypercar	7	(Japan) Toyota Gazoo Racing	(Japan) Kamui Kobayashi	2:08.702
Free Practice 3	LMP2	31	(Belgium) Team WRT	(Austria) Ferdinand Habsburg	2:10.268
Free Practice 3	LMGTE Am	60	(Italy) Iron Lynx	(Italy) Matteo Cressoni	2:25.726

== Qualifying ==
Pole position winners in each class are marked in bold.

Pos	Class	No.	Team	Time	Gap	Grid
1	**Hypercar**	**7**	**(Japan) Toyota Gazoo Racing**	**2:00.812**	-	**1**
2	Hypercar	50	(Italy) Ferrari AF Corse	2:00.836	+0.024	2
3	Hypercar	51	(Italy) Ferrari AF Corse	2:00.973	+0.161	3
4	Hypercar	2	(United States) Cadillac Racing	2:01.043	+0.231	4
5	Hypercar	3	(United States) Cadillac Racing	2:02.138	+1.326	5
6	Hypercar	6	(Germany) Porsche Penske Motorsport	2:02.306	+1.494	6
7	Hypercar	38	(United Kingdom) Hertz Team Jota	2:02.907	+2.095	7
8	Hypercar	708	(United States) Glickenhaus Racing	2:02.960	+2.148	8
9	Hypercar	93	(France) Peugeot TotalEnergies	2:03.217	+2.405	9
10	Hypercar	5	(Germany) Porsche Penske Motorsport	2:03.650	+2.838	10
11	Hypercar	94	(France) Peugeot TotalEnergies	2:03.879	+3.067	11
12	Hypercar	4	(Austria) Floyd Vanwall Racing Team	2:04.614	+3.802	12
13	**LMP2**	**23**	**(United Kingdom) United Autosports**	**2:05.979**	**+5.167**	**13**
14	LMP2	41	(Belgium) Team WRT	2:06.318	+5.506	14
15	LMP2	63	(Italy) Prema Racing	2:06.506	+5.694	14
16	LMP2	31	(Belgium) Team WRT	2:06.532	+5.720	16
17	LMP2	28	(United Kingdom) Jota	2:06.556	+5.744	17
18	LMP2	9	(Italy) Prema Racing	2:06.601	+5.789	18
19	LMP2	22	(United Kingdom) United Autosports	2:06.684	+5.872	19
20	LMP2	34	(Poland) Inter Europol Competition	2:06.825	+6.013	20
21	LMP2	10	(United Kingdom) Vector Sport	2:07.035	+6.223	21
22	LMP2	35	(France) Alpine Elf Team	2:07.099	+6.287	22
23	LMP2	36	(France) Alpine Elf Team	2:07.157	+6.345	23
24	**LMGTE Am**	**25**	**(Oman) ORT by TF**	**2:17.216**	**+16.404**	**24**
25	LMGTE Am	85	(Italy) Iron Dames	2:19.150	+18.338	25
26	LMGTE Am	88	(Germany) Proton Competition	2:19.481	+18.669	26
27	LMGTE Am	33	(United States) Corvette Racing	2:19.506	+18.694	27
28	LMGTE Am	83	(Italy) Richard Mille AF Corse	2:19.723	+18.911	28
29	LMGTE Am	98	(Canada) Northwest AMR	2:19.976	+19.164	29
30	LMGTE Am	54	(Italy) AF Corse	2:20.382	+19.570	30
31	LMGTE Am	777	(Japan) D'Station Racing	2:20.507	+19.695	31
32	LMGTE Am	57	(Switzerland) Kessel Racing	2:20.515	+19.703	32
33	LMGTE Am	77	(Germany) Dempsey-Proton Racing	2:21.247	+20.435	33
34	LMGTE Am	86	(United Kingdom) GR Racing	2:22.469	+21.657	34
35	LMGTE Am	60	(Italy) Iron Lynx	2:23.097	+22.285	35
36	LMGTE Am	56	(Germany) Project 1 – AO	No Time	—	36
37	Hypercar	8	(Japan) Toyota Gazoo Racing	No Time	—	37
38	LMGTE Am	21	(Italy) AF Corse	No Time	—	38

== Race ==
The minimum number of laps for classification (70% of overall winning car's distance) was 103 laps. Class winners are in bold and ‡.

Final race classification
Pos	Class	No	Team	Drivers	Chassis	Tyre	Laps	Time/Retired
Pos	Class	No	Team	Drivers	Engine	Tyre	Laps	Time/Retired
1	**Hypercar**	**7**	**(Japan) Toyota Gazoo Racing**	**(United Kingdom) Mike Conway (Japan) Kamui Kobayashi (Argentina) José María López**	**Toyota GR010 Hybrid**	M	**148**	**6:00:24.798‡ (Note: The No. 7 Toyota GR010 Hybrid received a 5-second penalty due to overtaking off-track without giving back the position.)**
1	**Hypercar**	**7**	**(Japan) Toyota Gazoo Racing**	**(United Kingdom) Mike Conway (Japan) Kamui Kobayashi (Argentina) José María López**	**Toyota H8909 3.5 L Turbo V6**	M	**148**	**6:00:24.798‡**
2	Hypercar	8	(Japan) Toyota Gazoo Racing	(Switzerland) Sébastien Buemi (New Zealand) Brendon Hartley (Japan) Ryo Hirakawa	Toyota GR010 Hybrid	M	148	+11.637
2	Hypercar	8	(Japan) Toyota Gazoo Racing	(Switzerland) Sébastien Buemi (New Zealand) Brendon Hartley (Japan) Ryo Hirakawa	Toyota H8909 3.5 L Turbo V6	M	148	+11.637
3	Hypercar	51	(Italy) Ferrari AF Corse	(United Kingdom) James Calado (Italy) Antonio Giovinazzi (Italy) Alessandro Pier Guidi	Ferrari 499P	M	148	+1:09.439
3	Hypercar	51	(Italy) Ferrari AF Corse	(United Kingdom) James Calado (Italy) Antonio Giovinazzi (Italy) Alessandro Pier Guidi	Ferrari F163 3.0 L Turbo V6	M	148	+1:09.439
4	Hypercar	5	(Germany) Porsche Penske Motorsport	(United States) Dane Cameron (Denmark) Michael Christensen (France) Frédéric Makowiecki	Porsche 963	M	148	+1:12.264
4	Hypercar	5	(Germany) Porsche Penske Motorsport	(United States) Dane Cameron (Denmark) Michael Christensen (France) Frédéric Makowiecki	Porsche 9RD 4.6 L Turbo V8	M	148	+1:12.264
5	Hypercar	2	(United States) Cadillac Racing	(New Zealand) Earl Bamber (United Kingdom) Alex Lynn (United Kingdom) Richard Westbrook	Cadillac V-Series.R	M	147	+1 Lap
5	Hypercar	2	(United States) Cadillac Racing	(New Zealand) Earl Bamber (United Kingdom) Alex Lynn (United Kingdom) Richard Westbrook	Cadillac LMC55R 5.5 L V8	M	147	+1 Lap
6	Hypercar	38	(United Kingdom) Hertz Team Jota	(Portugal) António Félix da Costa (United Kingdom) Will Stevens (China) Yifei Ye	Porsche 963	M	147	+1 Lap
6	Hypercar	38	(United Kingdom) Hertz Team Jota	(Portugal) António Félix da Costa (United Kingdom) Will Stevens (China) Yifei Ye	Porsche 9RD 4.6 L Turbo V8	M	147	+1 Lap
7	**LMP2**	**41**	**(Belgium) Team WRT**	**(Angola) Rui Andrade (Switzerland) Louis Delétraz (Poland) Robert Kubica**	**Oreca 07**	G	**146**	**+2 Laps‡**
7	**LMP2**	**41**	**(Belgium) Team WRT**	**(Angola) Rui Andrade (Switzerland) Louis Delétraz (Poland) Robert Kubica**	**Gibson GK428 4.2 L V8**	G	**146**	**+2 Laps‡**
8	LMP2	23	(United Kingdom) United Autosports	(United Kingdom) Tom Blomqvist (United Kingdom) Oliver Jarvis (United States) Josh Pierson	Oreca 07	G	146	+2 Laps
8	LMP2	23	(United Kingdom) United Autosports	(United Kingdom) Tom Blomqvist (United Kingdom) Oliver Jarvis (United States) Josh Pierson	Gibson GK428 4.2 L V8	G	146	+2 Laps
9	LMP2	34	(Poland) Inter Europol Competition	(Spain) Albert Costa (Switzerland) Fabio Scherer (Poland) Jakub Śmiechowski	Oreca 07	G	146	+2 Laps
9	LMP2	34	(Poland) Inter Europol Competition	(Spain) Albert Costa (Switzerland) Fabio Scherer (Poland) Jakub Śmiechowski	Gibson GK428 4.2 L V8	G	146	+2 Laps
10	LMP2	9	(Italy) Prema Racing	(Italy) Andrea Caldarelli (Romania) Filip Ugran (Netherlands) Bent Viscaal	Oreca 07	G	146	+2 Laps
10	LMP2	9	(Italy) Prema Racing	(Italy) Andrea Caldarelli (Romania) Filip Ugran (Netherlands) Bent Viscaal	Gibson GK428 4.2 L V8	G	146	+2 Laps
11	LMP2	22	(United Kingdom) United Autosports	(Portugal) Filipe Albuquerque (United Kingdom) Philip Hanson (United Kingdom) Frederick Lubin	Oreca 07	G	146	+2 Laps
11	LMP2	22	(United Kingdom) United Autosports	(Portugal) Filipe Albuquerque (United Kingdom) Philip Hanson (United Kingdom) Frederick Lubin	Gibson GK428 4.2 L V8	G	146	+2 Laps
12	LMP2	31	(Belgium) Team WRT	(Netherlands) Robin Frijns (Indonesia) Sean Gelael (Austria) Ferdinand Habsburg	Oreca 07	G	146	+2 Laps
12	LMP2	31	(Belgium) Team WRT	(Netherlands) Robin Frijns (Indonesia) Sean Gelael (Austria) Ferdinand Habsburg	Gibson GK428 4.2 L V8	G	146	+2 Laps
13	Hypercar	708	(United States) Glickenhaus Racing	(France) Romain Dumas (France) Franck Mailleux (France) Olivier Pla	Glickenhaus SCG 007 LMH	M	146	+2 Laps
13	Hypercar	708	(United States) Glickenhaus Racing	(France) Romain Dumas (France) Franck Mailleux (France) Olivier Pla	Glickenhaus P21 3.5 L Turbo V8	M	146	+2 Laps
14	Hypercar	93	(France) Peugeot TotalEnergies	(Denmark) Mikkel Jensen (United Kingdom) Paul di Resta (France) Jean-Éric Vergne	Peugeot 9X8	M	146	+2 Laps (Note: The No. 93 Peugeot 9X8 received a 5-second penalty for leaving the pits whilst a mechanic was still in the working area.)
14	Hypercar	93	(France) Peugeot TotalEnergies	(Denmark) Mikkel Jensen (United Kingdom) Paul di Resta (France) Jean-Éric Vergne	Peugeot X6H 2.6 L Turbo V6	M	146	+2 Laps
15	LMP2	36	(France) Alpine Elf Team	(France) Julien Canal (France) Charles Milesi (France) Matthieu Vaxivière	Oreca 07	G	146	+2 Laps
15	LMP2	36	(France) Alpine Elf Team	(France) Julien Canal (France) Charles Milesi (France) Matthieu Vaxivière	Gibson GK428 4.2 L V8	G	146	+2 Laps
16	LMP2	35	(France) Alpine Elf Team	(United Kingdom) Olli Caldwell (Brazil) André Negrão (Mexico) Memo Rojas	Oreca 07	G	146	+2 Laps
16	LMP2	35	(France) Alpine Elf Team	(United Kingdom) Olli Caldwell (Brazil) André Negrão (Mexico) Memo Rojas	Gibson GK428 4.2 L V8	G	146	+2 Laps
17	Hypercar	94	(France) Peugeot TotalEnergies	(France) Loïc Duval (United States) Gustavo Menezes (Switzerland) Nico Müller	Peugeot 9X8	M	146	+2 Laps
17	Hypercar	94	(France) Peugeot TotalEnergies	(France) Loïc Duval (United States) Gustavo Menezes (Switzerland) Nico Müller	Peugeot X6H 2.6 L Turbo V6	M	146	+2 Laps
18	LMP2	28	(United Kingdom) Jota	(Brazil) Pietro Fittipaldi (Denmark) David Heinemeier Hansson (Denmark) Oliver Rasmussen	Oreca 07	G	145	+3 Laps
18	LMP2	28	(United Kingdom) Jota	(Brazil) Pietro Fittipaldi (Denmark) David Heinemeier Hansson (Denmark) Oliver Rasmussen	Gibson GK428 4.2 L V8	G	145	+3 Laps
19	LMP2	63	(Italy) Prema Racing	(Italy) Mirko Bortolotti; Daniil Kvyat (France) Doriane Pin	Oreca 07	G	144	+4 Laps
19	LMP2	63	(Italy) Prema Racing	(Italy) Mirko Bortolotti; Daniil Kvyat (France) Doriane Pin	Gibson GK428 4.2 L V8	G	144	+4 Laps
20	**LMGTE Am**	**83**	**(Italy) Richard Mille AF Corse**	**(Argentina) Luis Pérez Companc (Italy) Alessio Rovera (France) Lilou Wadoux**	**Ferrari 488 GTE Evo**	M	**140**	**+8 Laps‡**
20	**LMGTE Am**	**83**	**(Italy) Richard Mille AF Corse**	**(Argentina) Luis Pérez Companc (Italy) Alessio Rovera (France) Lilou Wadoux**	**Ferrari F154CB 3.9 L Turbo V8**	M	**140**	**+8 Laps‡**
21	LMGTE Am	33	(United States) Corvette Racing	(Netherlands) Nicky Catsburg (United States) Ben Keating (Argentina) Nicolás Varrone	Chevrolet Corvette C8.R	M	140	+8 Laps
21	LMGTE Am	33	(United States) Corvette Racing	(Netherlands) Nicky Catsburg (United States) Ben Keating (Argentina) Nicolás Varrone	Chevrolet 5.5 L V8	M	140	+8 Laps
22	LMGTE Am	25	(Oman) ORT by TF	(Oman) Ahmad Al Harthy (United States) Michael Dinan (Republic of Ireland) Charlie Eastwood	Aston Martin Vantage AMR	M	140	+8 Laps
22	LMGTE Am	25	(Oman) ORT by TF	(Oman) Ahmad Al Harthy (United States) Michael Dinan (Republic of Ireland) Charlie Eastwood	Aston Martin 4.0 L Turbo V8	M	140	+8 Laps
23	LMGTE Am	88	(Germany) Proton Competition	(United States) Ryan Hardwick (Canada) Zacharie Robichon (United Kingdom) Harry Tincknell	Porsche 911 RSR-19	M	139	+9 Laps
23	LMGTE Am	88	(Germany) Proton Competition	(United States) Ryan Hardwick (Canada) Zacharie Robichon (United Kingdom) Harry Tincknell	Porsche 4.2 L Flat-6	M	139	+9 Laps
24	LMGTE Am	85	(Italy) Iron Dames	(Belgium) Sarah Bovy (Switzerland) Rahel Frey (Denmark) Michelle Gatting	Porsche 911 RSR-19	M	139	+9 Laps
24	LMGTE Am	85	(Italy) Iron Dames	(Belgium) Sarah Bovy (Switzerland) Rahel Frey (Denmark) Michelle Gatting	Porsche 4.2 L Flat-6	M	139	+9 Laps
25	LMGTE Am	21	(Italy) AF Corse	(Italy) Diego Alessi (United States) Simon Mann (Belgium) Ulysse de Pauw	Ferrari 488 GTE Evo	M	139	+9 Laps
25	LMGTE Am	21	(Italy) AF Corse	(Italy) Diego Alessi (United States) Simon Mann (Belgium) Ulysse de Pauw	Ferrari F154CB 3.9 L Turbo V8	M	139	+9 Laps
26	LMGTE Am	98	(Canada) Northwest AMR	(United States) Ian James (Italy) Daniel Mancinelli (Spain) Alex Riberas	Aston Martin Vantage AMR	M	139	+9 Laps
26	LMGTE Am	98	(Canada) Northwest AMR	(United States) Ian James (Italy) Daniel Mancinelli (Spain) Alex Riberas	Aston Martin 4.0 L Turbo V8	M	139	+9 Laps
27	LMGTE Am	57	(Switzerland) Kessel Racing	(United States) Scott Huffaker (Japan) Takeshi Kimura (Brazil) Daniel Serra	Ferrari 488 GTE Evo	M	139	+9 Laps
27	LMGTE Am	57	(Switzerland) Kessel Racing	(United States) Scott Huffaker (Japan) Takeshi Kimura (Brazil) Daniel Serra	Ferrari F154CB 3.9 L Turbo V8	M	139	+9 Laps
28	LMGTE Am	77	(Germany) Dempsey-Proton Racing	(France) Julien Andlauer (Germany) Christian Ried (Denmark) Mikkel O. Pedersen	Porsche 911 RSR-19	M	138	+10 Laps
28	LMGTE Am	77	(Germany) Dempsey-Proton Racing	(France) Julien Andlauer (Germany) Christian Ried (Denmark) Mikkel O. Pedersen	Porsche 4.2 L Flat-6	M	138	+10 Laps
29	LMGTE Am	777	(Japan) D'Station Racing	(Japan) Tomonobu Fujii (Japan) Satoshi Hoshino (United Kingdom) Casper Stevenson	Aston Martin Vantage AMR	M	138	+10 Laps (Note: The No. 777 Aston Martin Vantage AMR received a time penalty for not meeting the minimum drive time of 1 hours and 45 minutes with their driver Casper Stevenson.)
29	LMGTE Am	777	(Japan) D'Station Racing	(Japan) Tomonobu Fujii (Japan) Satoshi Hoshino (United Kingdom) Casper Stevenson	Aston Martin 4.0 L Turbo V8	M	138	+10 Laps
30	LMGTE Am	60	(Italy) Iron Lynx	(Italy) Matteo Cressoni (Belgium) Alessio Picariello (Italy) Claudio Schiavoni	Porsche 911 RSR-19	M	137	+11 Laps
30	LMGTE Am	60	(Italy) Iron Lynx	(Italy) Matteo Cressoni (Belgium) Alessio Picariello (Italy) Claudio Schiavoni	Porsche 4.2 L Flat-6	M	137	+11 Laps
31	LMGTE Am	86	(United Kingdom) GR Racing	(United Kingdom) Ben Barker (Italy) Riccardo Pera (United Kingdom) Michael Wainwright	Porsche 911 RSR-19	M	136	+12 Laps
31	LMGTE Am	86	(United Kingdom) GR Racing	(United Kingdom) Ben Barker (Italy) Riccardo Pera (United Kingdom) Michael Wainwright	Porsche 4.2 L Flat-6	M	136	+12 Laps
Ret	Hypercar	50	(Italy) Ferrari AF Corse	(Italy) Antonio Fuoco (Spain) Miguel Molina (Denmark) Nicklas Nielsen	Ferrari 499P	M	106	Accident
Ret	Hypercar	50	(Italy) Ferrari AF Corse	(Italy) Antonio Fuoco (Spain) Miguel Molina (Denmark) Nicklas Nielsen	Ferrari F163 3.0 L Turbo V6	M	106	Accident
Ret	Hypercar	4	(Austria) Floyd Vanwall Racing Team	(France) Tom Dillmann (Argentina) Esteban Guerrieri (Canada) Jacques Villeneuve	Vanwall Vandervell 680	M	80	Accident
Ret	Hypercar	4	(Austria) Floyd Vanwall Racing Team	(France) Tom Dillmann (Argentina) Esteban Guerrieri (Canada) Jacques Villeneuve	Gibson GL458 4.5 L V8	M	80	Accident
NC	LMGTE Am	54	(Italy) AF Corse	(Italy) Francesco Castellacci (Switzerland) Thomas Flohr (Italy) Davide Rigon	Ferrari 488 GTE Evo	M	79	Accident
NC	LMGTE Am	54	(Italy) AF Corse	(Italy) Francesco Castellacci (Switzerland) Thomas Flohr (Italy) Davide Rigon	Ferrari F154CB 3.9 L Turbo V8	M	79	Accident
Ret	Hypercar	6	(Germany) Porsche Penske Motorsport	(France) Kévin Estre (Germany) André Lotterer (Belgium) Laurens Vanthoor	Porsche 963	M	53	Electrics
Ret	Hypercar	6	(Germany) Porsche Penske Motorsport	(France) Kévin Estre (Germany) André Lotterer (Belgium) Laurens Vanthoor	Porsche 9RD 4.6 L Turbo V8	M	53	Electrics
Ret	Hypercar	3	(United States) Cadillac Racing	(United Kingdom) Jack Aitken (France) Sébastien Bourdais (Netherlands) Renger van der Zande	Cadillac V-Series.R	M	40	Accident
Ret	Hypercar	3	(United States) Cadillac Racing	(United Kingdom) Jack Aitken (France) Sébastien Bourdais (Netherlands) Renger van der Zande	Cadillac LMC55R 5.5 L V8	M	40	Accident
Ret	LMP2	10	(United Kingdom) Vector Sport	(France) Gabriel Aubry (Republic of Ireland) Ryan Cullen (Liechtenstein) Matthias Kaiser	Oreca 07	G	14	Wheel
Ret	LMP2	10	(United Kingdom) Vector Sport	(France) Gabriel Aubry (Republic of Ireland) Ryan Cullen (Liechtenstein) Matthias Kaiser	Gibson GK428 4.2 L V8	G	14	Wheel

Tyre manufacturers
Key
Symbol	Tyre manufacturer
**G**	Goodyear
**M**	Michelin

== Standings after the race ==
2023 Hypercar World Endurance Drivers'
Championship

Pos	+/-	Driver	Points
1		(Switzerland) Sébastien Buemi (New Zealand) Brendon Hartley (Japan) Ryō Hirakawa	71
2	1	(United Kingdom) Mike Conway (Japan) Kamui Kobayashi (Argentina) José María López	66
3	1	(Italy) Antonio Fuoco (Spain) Miguel Molina (Denmark) Nicklas Nielsen	42
4		(New Zealand) Earl Bamber (United Kingdom) Alex Lynn (United Kingdom) Richard Westbrook	40
5	1	(United Kingdom) James Calado (Italy) Antonio Giovinazzi (Italy) Alessandro Pier Guidi	32

2023 Hypercar World Endurance Manufacturers' Championship

Pos	+/-	Manufacturer	Points
1		(Japan) Toyota	90
2		(Italy) Ferrari	57
3		(Germany) Porsche	42
4		(United States) Cadillac	40
5		(France) Peugeot	19

2023 FIA World Cup for Hypercar Teams

Pos	+/-	No.	Team	Points
1		38	(United Kingdom) Hertz Team Jota	25

2023 FIA Endurance Trophy for LMP2 Drivers

Pos	+/-	Drivers	Points
1		(United Kingdom) Philip Hanson (United Kingdom) Frederick Lubin	66
2	2	(Angola) Rui Andrade (Switzerland) Louis Delétraz (Poland) Robert Kubica	58
3		(Portugal) Filipe Albuquerque	48
4	1	(United Kingdom) Oliver Jarvis (United States) Josh Pierson	45
5	3	(Italy) Mirko Bortolotti; Daniil Kvyat (France) Doriane Pin	41

2023 FIA Endurance Trophy for LMP2 Teams

Pos	+/-	No.	Team	Points
1		22	(United Kingdom) United Autosports	66
2	1	41	(Belgium) Team WRT	58
3	1	23	(United Kingdom) United Autosports	45
4	2	63	(Italy) Prema Racing	41
5		34	(Poland) Inter Europol Competition	40

2023 FIA Endurance Trophy for LMGTE Am Drivers

Pos	+/-	Drivers	Points
1		(Netherlands) Nicky Catsburg (United States) Ben Keating (Argentina) Nicolás Varrone	82
2	5	(Argentina) Luis Pérez Companc (Italy) Alessio Rovera (France) Lilou Wadoux	43
3		(United States) Simon Mann (Belgium) Ulysse de Pauw	36
4	2	(France) Julien Andlauer (Germany) Christian Ried (Denmark) Mikkel O. Pedersen	35
5	1	(Belgium) Sarah Bovy (Switzerland) Rahel Frey (Denmark) Michelle Gatting	32

2023 FIA Endurance Trophy for LMGTE Am Teams

Pos	+/-	No.	Team	Points
1		33	(United States) Corvette Racing	82
2	5	83	(Germany) Richard Mille AF Corse	43
3		21	(Italy) AF Corse	36
4	2	77	(Germany) Dempsey-Proton Racing	35
5	1	85	(Italy) Iron Dames	32

- Note: Only the top five positions are included for all championship standings.

== Notes ==
FIA World Endurance Championship
Previous race: 6 Hours of Portimão	2023 season	Next race: 24 Hours of Le Mans
