= 2023 FIA World Endurance Championship =

Auto racing series

- Organizer: Fédération Internationale de l'Automobile; Automobile Club de l'Ouest
- Discipline: Sports car endurance racing
- Races: 7

Champions
- Hypercar Manufacturer: (Japan) Toyota
- Hypercar Team: (United Kingdom) Hertz Team Jota
- LMP2 Team: (Belgium) Team WRT
- LMGTE Am Team: (United States) Corvette Racing

FIA World Endurance Championship
- ← 2022 2024 →

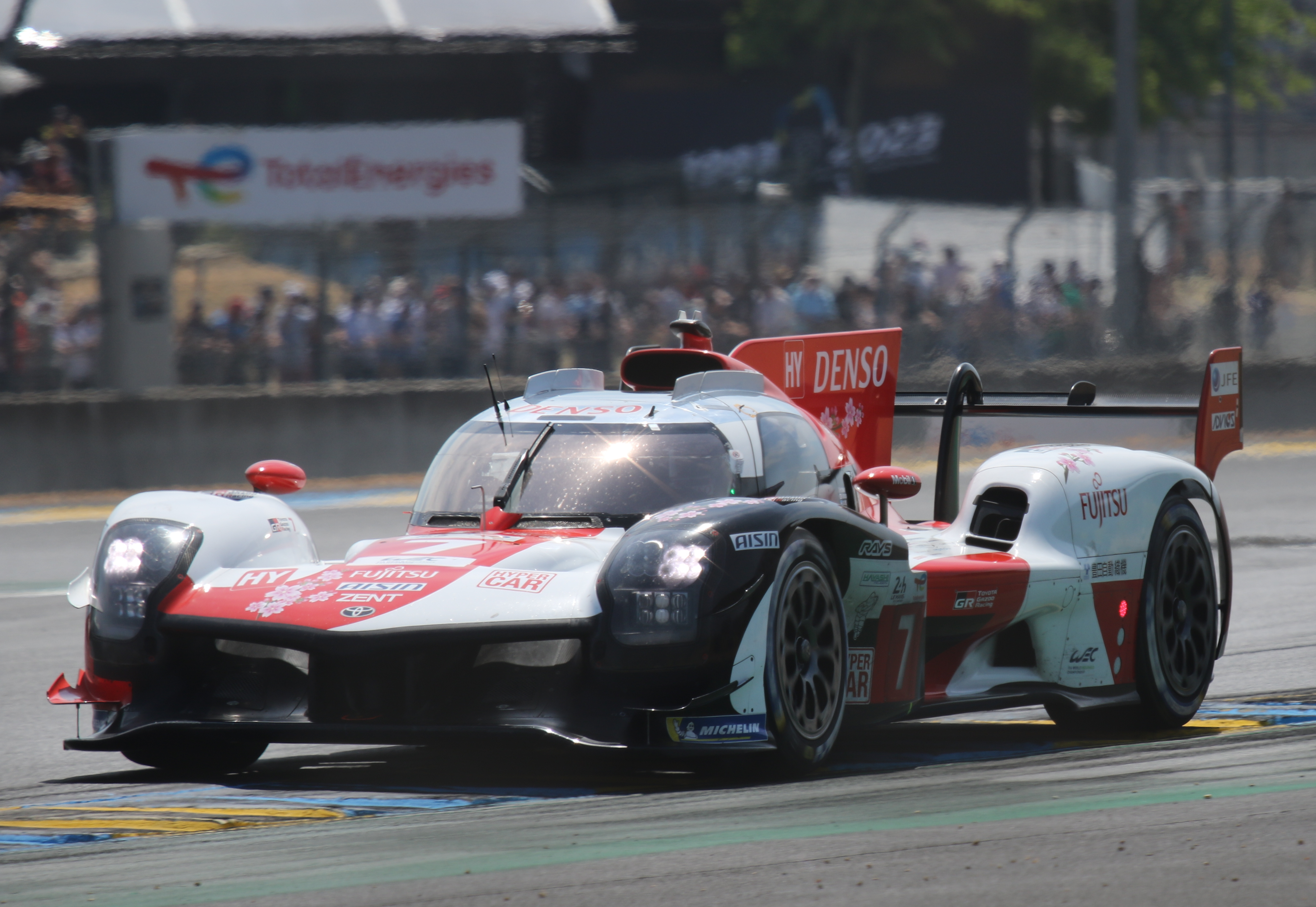
Toyota are the Hypercar Manufacturer champions.

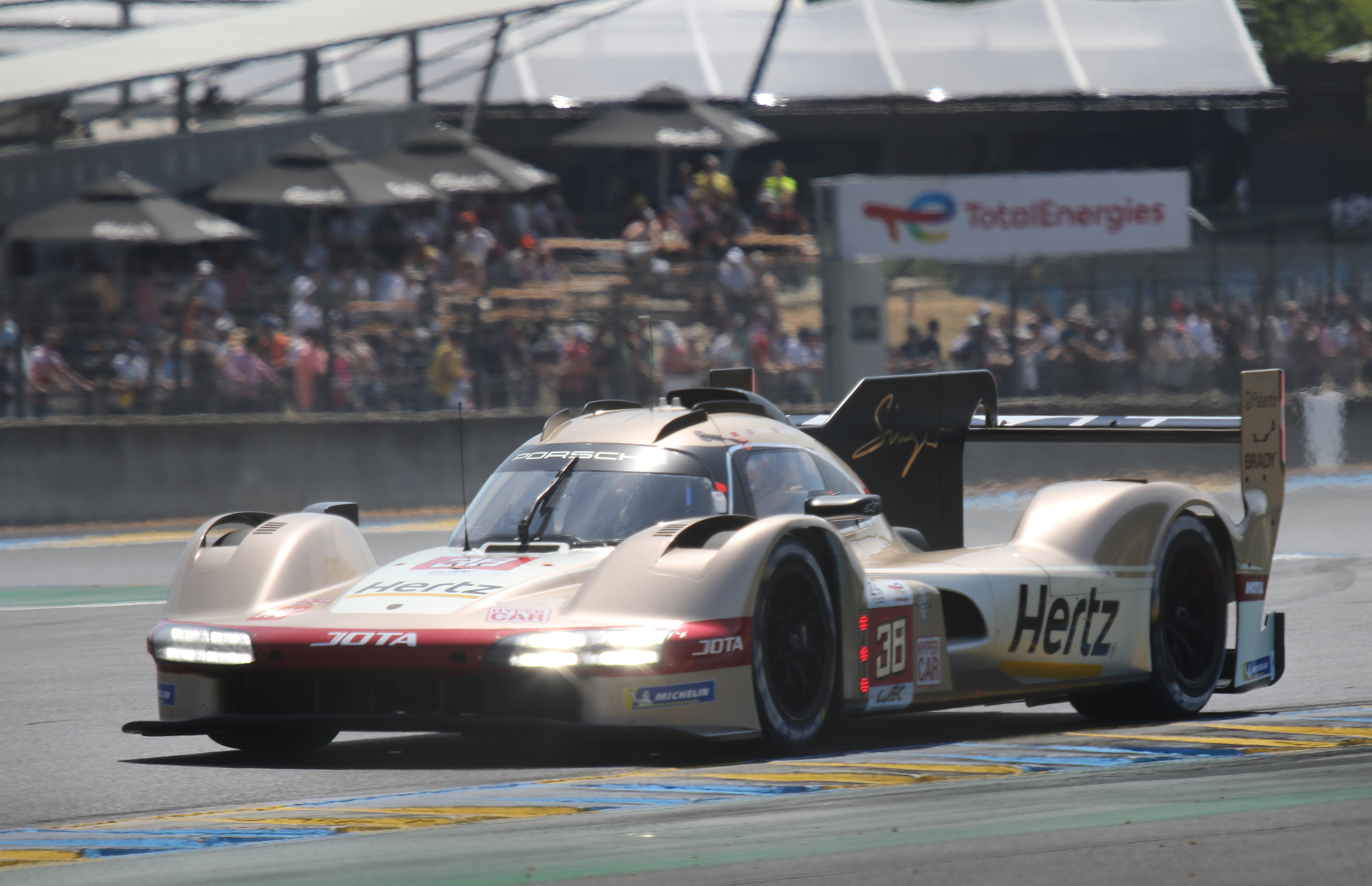
Team Jota are the Hypercar Team champions.

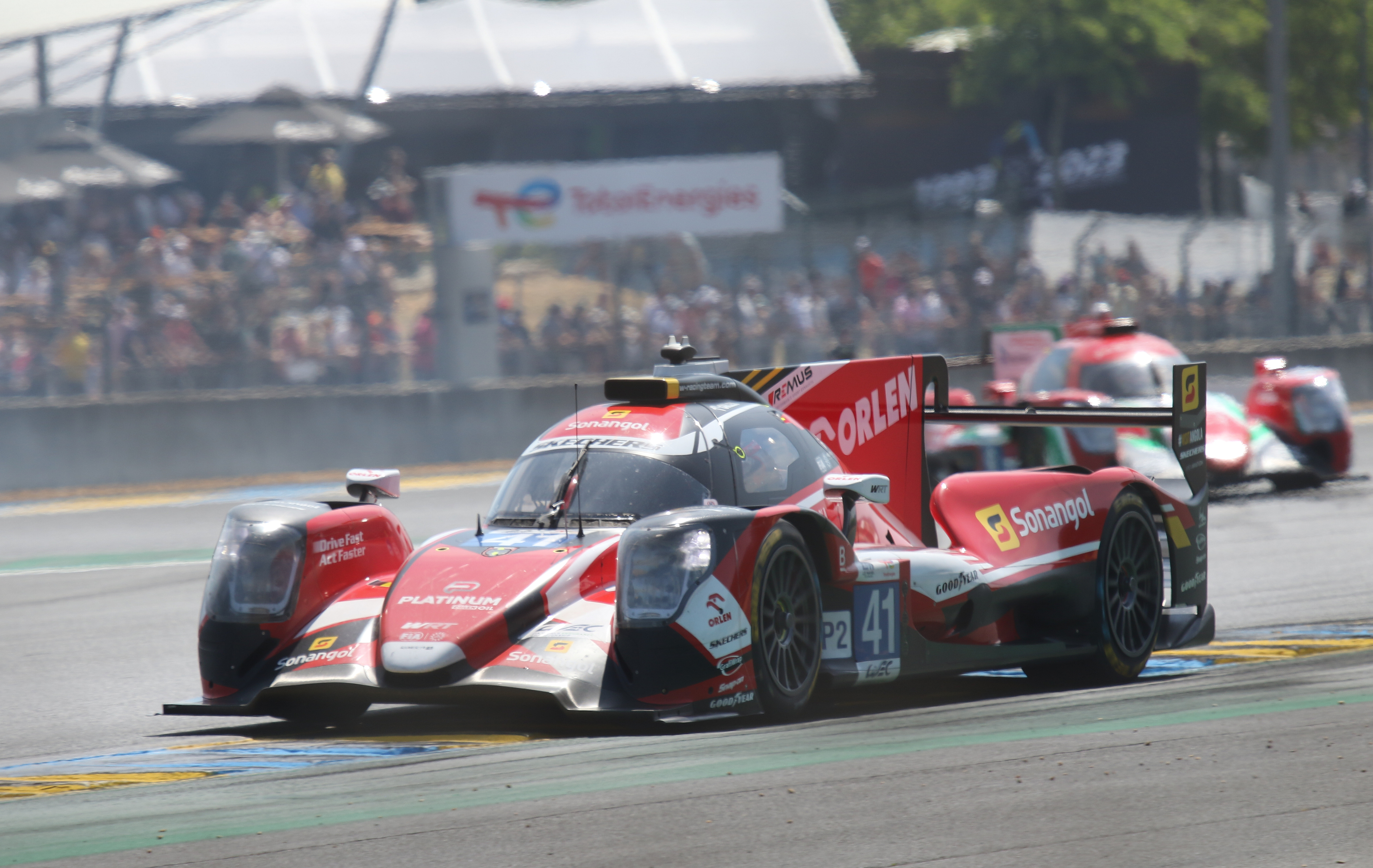
The No. 41 Team WRT are the LMP2 Team champions.

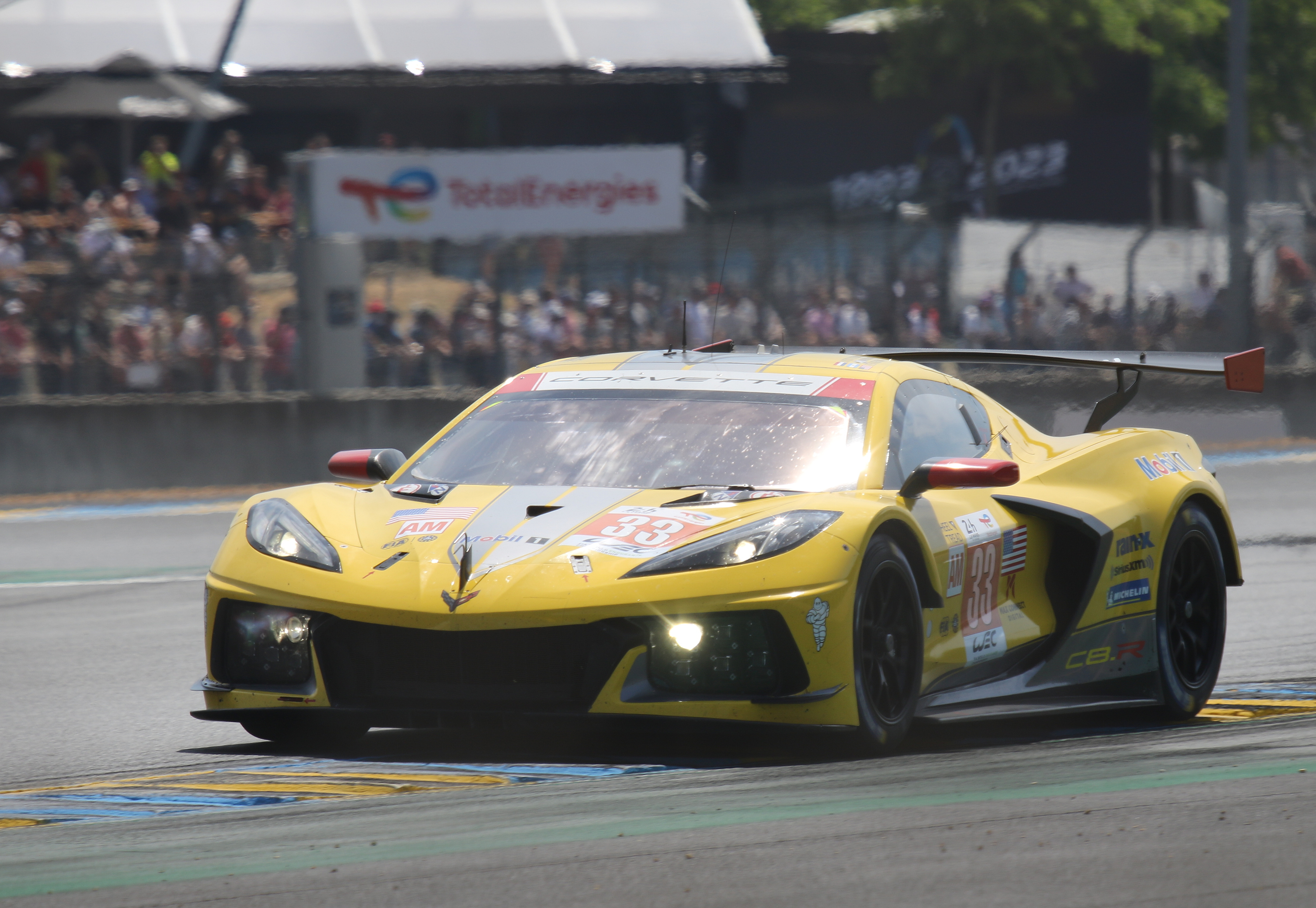
Corvette Racing are the LMGTE Am Team champions.

The 2023 FIA World Endurance Championship was the eleventh season of the FIA World Endurance Championship, an auto racing series organised by the Fédération Internationale de l'Automobile (FIA) and the Automobile Club de l'Ouest (ACO). The series was open to prototype and grand tourer-style racing cars divided into three categories. World Championship titles were awarded to the leading drivers in the prototype division and to the leading manufacturer in prototype division.

It was the first season in which LMDh (Le Mans Daytona h) entries were allowed to compete in the Hypercar category for championship points alongside LMH (Le Mans Hypercar) entries, after being permitted on a race-by-race basis in 2022. Upon the discontinuation of LMGTE Pro, LMGTE Am remained as the sole GT class, although it would be replaced by LMGT3 the following season. After being introduced for the 2021 season the LMP2 Pro-Am Cup was also dropped. This as well would also be the last season in the FIA WEC for the LMP2 Class with LMP2 to be removed for the next year's season in the year 2024 due to demand in grid numbers for the Hypercar and the incoming GT3-Spec based LMGT3 class replacing LMGTE Am reaching the maximum number of full season entries.

== Calendar ==
On 29 September 2022, the 2023 calendar was announced on the website and YouTube channel of the FIA World Endurance Championship, with the six races of the 2022 season and the return to Portimão, this time with a 6-hour format. The season played host to the centenary edition of the 24 Hours of Le Mans.

2023 calendar
| Rnd | Race | Circuit | Location | Date |
|---|---|---|---|---|
| | Prologue | Sebring International Raceway | (United States) Sebring, Florida | 11/12 March |
| 1 | 1000 Miles of Sebring | Sebring International Raceway | (United States) Sebring, Florida | 17 March |
| 2 | 6 Hours of Portimão | Algarve International Circuit | (Portugal) Portimão | 16 April |
| 3 | TotalEnergies 6 Hours of Spa-Francorchamps | Circuit de Spa-Francorchamps | (Belgium) Stavelot | 29 April |
| 4 | 24 Hours of Le Mans | Circuit de la Sarthe | (France) Le Mans | 10–11 June |
| 5 | 6 Hours of Monza | Autodromo Nazionale di Monza | (Italy) Monza | 9 July |
| 6 | 6 Hours of Fuji | Fuji Speedway | (Japan) Oyama, Shizuoka | 10 September |
| 7 | Bapco Energies 8 Hours of Bahrain | Bahrain International Circuit | (Bahrain) Sakhir | 4 November |

== Entries ==
=== Hypercar ===
Racing in the FIA World Cup for Hypercar Teams

| Entrant | Car | Engine | Hybrid | Tyre | No. | Drivers | Rounds |
|---|---|---|---|---|---|---|---|
| (United States) Cadillac Racing | Cadillac V-Series.R | Cadillac LMC55R 5.5 L V8 | Hybrid | M | 2 | (New Zealand) Earl Bamber | All |
| (United States) Cadillac Racing | Cadillac V-Series.R | Cadillac LMC55R 5.5 L V8 | Hybrid | M | 2 | (United Kingdom) Alex Lynn | All |
| (United States) Cadillac Racing | Cadillac V-Series.R | Cadillac LMC55R 5.5 L V8 | Hybrid | M | 2 | (United Kingdom) Richard Westbrook | All |
| (Austria) Floyd Vanwall Racing Team | Vanwall Vandervell 680 | Gibson GL458 4.5 L V8 | | M | 4 | (Argentina) Esteban Guerrieri | All |
| (Austria) Floyd Vanwall Racing Team | Vanwall Vandervell 680 | Gibson GL458 4.5 L V8 | | M | 4 | (France) Tom Dillmann | 1–4 |
| (Austria) Floyd Vanwall Racing Team | Vanwall Vandervell 680 | Gibson GL458 4.5 L V8 | | M | 4 | (Canada) Jacques Villeneuve | 1–3 |
| (Austria) Floyd Vanwall Racing Team | Vanwall Vandervell 680 | Gibson GL458 4.5 L V8 | | M | 4 | (France) Tristan Vautier | 4–7 |
| (Austria) Floyd Vanwall Racing Team | Vanwall Vandervell 680 | Gibson GL458 4.5 L V8 | | M | 4 | (Brazil) João Paulo de Oliveira | 5–6 |
| (Austria) Floyd Vanwall Racing Team | Vanwall Vandervell 680 | Gibson GL458 4.5 L V8 | | M | 4 | (Australia) Ryan Briscoe | 7 |
| (Germany) Porsche Penske Motorsport | Porsche 963 | Porsche 9RD 4.6 L Turbo V8 | Hybrid | M | 5 | (United States) Dane Cameron | All |
| (Germany) Porsche Penske Motorsport | Porsche 963 | Porsche 9RD 4.6 L Turbo V8 | Hybrid | M | 5 | (Denmark) Michael Christensen | All |
| (Germany) Porsche Penske Motorsport | Porsche 963 | Porsche 9RD 4.6 L Turbo V8 | Hybrid | M | 5 | (France) Frédéric Makowiecki | All |
| (Germany) Porsche Penske Motorsport | Porsche 963 | Porsche 9RD 4.6 L Turbo V8 | Hybrid | M | 6 | (France) Kévin Estre | All |
| (Germany) Porsche Penske Motorsport | Porsche 963 | Porsche 9RD 4.6 L Turbo V8 | Hybrid | M | 6 | (Germany) André Lotterer | All |
| (Germany) Porsche Penske Motorsport | Porsche 963 | Porsche 9RD 4.6 L Turbo V8 | Hybrid | M | 6 | (Belgium) Laurens Vanthoor | All |
| (Japan) Toyota Gazoo Racing | Toyota GR010 Hybrid | Toyota H8909 3.5 L Turbo V6 | Hybrid | M | 7 | (United Kingdom) Mike Conway | All |
| (Japan) Toyota Gazoo Racing | Toyota GR010 Hybrid | Toyota H8909 3.5 L Turbo V6 | Hybrid | M | 7 | (Japan) Kamui Kobayashi | All |
| (Japan) Toyota Gazoo Racing | Toyota GR010 Hybrid | Toyota H8909 3.5 L Turbo V6 | Hybrid | M | 7 | (Argentina) José María López | All |
| (Japan) Toyota Gazoo Racing | Toyota GR010 Hybrid | Toyota H8909 3.5 L Turbo V6 | Hybrid | M | 8 | (Switzerland) Sébastien Buemi | All |
| (Japan) Toyota Gazoo Racing | Toyota GR010 Hybrid | Toyota H8909 3.5 L Turbo V6 | Hybrid | M | 8 | (New Zealand) Brendon Hartley | All |
| (Japan) Toyota Gazoo Racing | Toyota GR010 Hybrid | Toyota H8909 3.5 L Turbo V6 | Hybrid | M | 8 | (Japan) Ryō Hirakawa | All |
| (United Kingdom) Hertz Team Jota | Porsche 963 | Porsche 9RD 4.6 L Turbo V8 | Hybrid | M | 38 | (Portugal) António Félix da Costa | 3–7 |
| (United Kingdom) Hertz Team Jota | Porsche 963 | Porsche 9RD 4.6 L Turbo V8 | Hybrid | M | 38 | (United Kingdom) Will Stevens | 3–7 |
| (United Kingdom) Hertz Team Jota | Porsche 963 | Porsche 9RD 4.6 L Turbo V8 | Hybrid | M | 38 | (China) Yifei Ye | 3–7 |
| (Italy) Ferrari AF Corse | Ferrari 499P | Ferrari F163CG 3.0 L Turbo V6 | Hybrid | M | 50 | (Italy) Antonio Fuoco | All |
| (Italy) Ferrari AF Corse | Ferrari 499P | Ferrari F163CG 3.0 L Turbo V6 | Hybrid | M | 50 | (Spain) Miguel Molina | All |
| (Italy) Ferrari AF Corse | Ferrari 499P | Ferrari F163CG 3.0 L Turbo V6 | Hybrid | M | 50 | (Denmark) Nicklas Nielsen | All |
| (Italy) Ferrari AF Corse | Ferrari 499P | Ferrari F163CG 3.0 L Turbo V6 | Hybrid | M | 51 | (United Kingdom) James Calado | All |
| (Italy) Ferrari AF Corse | Ferrari 499P | Ferrari F163CG 3.0 L Turbo V6 | Hybrid | M | 51 | (Italy) Antonio Giovinazzi | All |
| (Italy) Ferrari AF Corse | Ferrari 499P | Ferrari F163CG 3.0 L Turbo V6 | Hybrid | M | 51 | (Italy) Alessandro Pier Guidi | All |
| (France) Peugeot TotalEnergies | Peugeot 9X8 | Peugeot X6H 2.6 L Turbo V6 | Hybrid | M | 93 | (United Kingdom) Paul di Resta | All |
| (France) Peugeot TotalEnergies | Peugeot 9X8 | Peugeot X6H 2.6 L Turbo V6 | Hybrid | M | 93 | (Denmark) Mikkel Jensen | All |
| (France) Peugeot TotalEnergies | Peugeot 9X8 | Peugeot X6H 2.6 L Turbo V6 | Hybrid | M | 93 | (France) Jean-Éric Vergne | All |
| (France) Peugeot TotalEnergies | Peugeot 9X8 | Peugeot X6H 2.6 L Turbo V6 | Hybrid | M | 94 | (France) Loïc Duval | All |
| (France) Peugeot TotalEnergies | Peugeot 9X8 | Peugeot X6H 2.6 L Turbo V6 | Hybrid | M | 94 | (United States) Gustavo Menezes | All |
| (France) Peugeot TotalEnergies | Peugeot 9X8 | Peugeot X6H 2.6 L Turbo V6 | Hybrid | M | 94 | (Switzerland) Nico Müller | 1–5, 7 |
| (France) Peugeot TotalEnergies | Peugeot 9X8 | Peugeot X6H 2.6 L Turbo V6 | Hybrid | M | 94 | (Belgium) Stoffel Vandoorne | 6 |
| (Germany) Proton Competition | Porsche 963 | Porsche 9RD 4.6 L Turbo V8 | Hybrid | M | 99 | (Italy) Gianmaria Bruni | 5–7 |
| (Germany) Proton Competition | Porsche 963 | Porsche 9RD 4.6 L Turbo V8 | Hybrid | M | 99 | (Switzerland) Neel Jani | 5–7 |
| (Germany) Proton Competition | Porsche 963 | Porsche 9RD 4.6 L Turbo V8 | Hybrid | M | 99 | (United Kingdom) Harry Tincknell | 5–7 |
| (United States) Glickenhaus Racing | Glickenhaus SCG 007 LMH | Glickenhaus P21 3.5 L Turbo V8 | | M | 708 | (France) Romain Dumas | 1–5 |
| (United States) Glickenhaus Racing | Glickenhaus SCG 007 LMH | Glickenhaus P21 3.5 L Turbo V8 | | M | 708 | (France) Olivier Pla | 1–5 |
| (United States) Glickenhaus Racing | Glickenhaus SCG 007 LMH | Glickenhaus P21 3.5 L Turbo V8 | | M | 708 | (Australia) Ryan Briscoe | 1–2, 4 |
| (United States) Glickenhaus Racing | Glickenhaus SCG 007 LMH | Glickenhaus P21 3.5 L Turbo V8 | | M | 708 | (France) Franck Mailleux | 3 |
| (United States) Glickenhaus Racing | Glickenhaus SCG 007 LMH | Glickenhaus P21 3.5 L Turbo V8 | | M | 708 | (France) Nathanaël Berthon | 5 |

=== LMP2 ===
In accordance with the 2017 LMP2 regulations, all cars in the LMP2 class used the Gibson GK428 V8 engine.

| Entrant | Car | Tyre | No. | Drivers | Rounds |
|---|---|---|---|---|---|
| (Italy) Prema Racing | Oreca 07 | G | 9 | (Romania) Filip Ugran | All |
| (Italy) Prema Racing | Oreca 07 | G | 9 | (Netherlands) Bent Viscaal | All |
| (Italy) Prema Racing | Oreca 07 | G | 9 | (Italy) Andrea Caldarelli | 1, 3, 5 |
| (Italy) Prema Racing | Oreca 07 | G | 9 | (United States) Juan Manuel Correa | 2, 4, 6–7 |
| (Italy) Prema Racing | Oreca 07 | G | 63 | Daniil Kvyat (Note: Daniil Kvyat is Russian, but he competes as a neutral competitor as Russian national emblems were banned by the FIA due to the Russian invasion of Ukraine.) | All |
| (Italy) Prema Racing | Oreca 07 | G | 63 | (France) Doriane Pin | All |
| (Italy) Prema Racing | Oreca 07 | G | 63 | (Italy) Mirko Bortolotti | 1–4, 7 |
| (Italy) Prema Racing | Oreca 07 | G | 63 | (Switzerland) Mathias Beche | 5 |
| (Italy) Prema Racing | Oreca 07 | G | 63 | (Italy) Andrea Caldarelli | 6 |
| (United Kingdom) Vector Sport | Oreca 07 | G | 10 | (France) Gabriel Aubry | All |
| (United Kingdom) Vector Sport | Oreca 07 | G | 10 | (Republic of Ireland) Ryan Cullen | All |
| (United Kingdom) Vector Sport | Oreca 07 | G | 10 | (Liechtenstein) Matthias Kaiser | All |
| (United Kingdom) United Autosports | Oreca 07 | G | 22 | (United Kingdom) Phil Hanson | All |
| (United Kingdom) United Autosports | Oreca 07 | G | 22 | (United Kingdom) Frederick Lubin | All |
| (United Kingdom) United Autosports | Oreca 07 | G | 22 | (Portugal) Filipe Albuquerque | 1, 3–4, 6–7 |
| (United Kingdom) United Autosports | Oreca 07 | G | 22 | (United Kingdom) Ben Hanley | 2, 5 |
| (United Kingdom) United Autosports | Oreca 07 | G | 23 | (United Kingdom) Oliver Jarvis | All |
| (United Kingdom) United Autosports | Oreca 07 | G | 23 | (United States) Josh Pierson | All |
| (United Kingdom) United Autosports | Oreca 07 | G | 23 | (United Kingdom) Tom Blomqvist | 1, 3–4, 7 |
| (United Kingdom) United Autosports | Oreca 07 | G | 23 | (Netherlands) Giedo van der Garde | 2, 5 |
| (United Kingdom) United Autosports | Oreca 07 | G | 23 | (United Kingdom) Ben Hanley | 6 |
| (United Kingdom) Jota | Oreca 07 | G | 28 | (Brazil) Pietro Fittipaldi | All |
| (United Kingdom) Jota | Oreca 07 | G | 28 | (Denmark) David Heinemeier Hansson | All |
| (United Kingdom) Jota | Oreca 07 | G | 28 | (Denmark) Oliver Rasmussen | All |
| (Belgium) Team WRT | Oreca 07 | G | 31 | (Netherlands) Robin Frijns | All |
| (Belgium) Team WRT | Oreca 07 | G | 31 | (Indonesia) Sean Gelael | All |
| (Belgium) Team WRT | Oreca 07 | G | 31 | (Austria) Ferdinand Habsburg | All |
| (Belgium) Team WRT | Oreca 07 | G | 41 | (Angola) Rui Andrade | All |
| (Belgium) Team WRT | Oreca 07 | G | 41 | (Switzerland) Louis Delétraz | All |
| (Belgium) Team WRT | Oreca 07 | G | 41 | (Poland) Robert Kubica | All |
| (Poland) Inter Europol Competition | Oreca 07 | G | 34 | (Spain) Albert Costa | All |
| (Poland) Inter Europol Competition | Oreca 07 | G | 34 | (Switzerland) Fabio Scherer | All |
| (Poland) Inter Europol Competition | Oreca 07 | G | 34 | (Poland) Jakub Śmiechowski | All |
| (France) Alpine Elf Team | Oreca 07 | G | 35 | (United Kingdom) Olli Caldwell | All |
| (France) Alpine Elf Team | Oreca 07 | G | 35 | (Brazil) André Negrão | All |
| (France) Alpine Elf Team | Oreca 07 | G | 35 | (Mexico) Memo Rojas | All |
| (France) Alpine Elf Team | Oreca 07 | G | 36 | (France) Julien Canal | All |
| (France) Alpine Elf Team | Oreca 07 | G | 36 | (France) Charles Milesi | All |
| (France) Alpine Elf Team | Oreca 07 | G | 36 | (France) Matthieu Vaxivière | All |

=== LMGTE Am ===
| Entrant | Car | Engine | Tyre | No. | Drivers | Rounds |
|---|---|---|---|---|---|---|
| (Italy) AF Corse | Ferrari 488 GTE Evo | Ferrari F154CB 4.0 L Turbo V8 | M | 21 | (United States) Simon Mann | All |
| (Italy) AF Corse | Ferrari 488 GTE Evo | Ferrari F154CB 4.0 L Turbo V8 | M | 21 | (Belgium) Ulysse de Pauw | 1–5 |
| (Italy) AF Corse | Ferrari 488 GTE Evo | Ferrari F154CB 4.0 L Turbo V8 | M | 21 | (Japan) Kei Cozzolino | 6–7 |
| (Italy) AF Corse | Ferrari 488 GTE Evo | Ferrari F154CB 4.0 L Turbo V8 | M | 21 | (Italy) Stefano Costantini | 1 |
| (Italy) AF Corse | Ferrari 488 GTE Evo | Ferrari F154CB 4.0 L Turbo V8 | M | 21 | (Italy) Diego Alessi | 2–3 |
| (Italy) AF Corse | Ferrari 488 GTE Evo | Ferrari F154CB 4.0 L Turbo V8 | M | 21 | (France) Julien Piguet | 4–5 |
| (Italy) AF Corse | Ferrari 488 GTE Evo | Ferrari F154CB 4.0 L Turbo V8 | M | 21 | (Japan) Hiroshi Koizumi | 6 |
| (Italy) AF Corse | Ferrari 488 GTE Evo | Ferrari F154CB 4.0 L Turbo V8 | M | 21 | (France) Franck Dezoteux | 7 |
| (Italy) AF Corse | Ferrari 488 GTE Evo | Ferrari F154CB 4.0 L Turbo V8 | M | 54 | (Italy) Francesco Castellacci | All |
| (Italy) AF Corse | Ferrari 488 GTE Evo | Ferrari F154CB 4.0 L Turbo V8 | M | 54 | (Switzerland) Thomas Flohr | All |
| (Italy) AF Corse | Ferrari 488 GTE Evo | Ferrari F154CB 4.0 L Turbo V8 | M | 54 | (Italy) Davide Rigon | All |
| (Italy) Richard Mille AF Corse | Ferrari 488 GTE Evo | Ferrari F154CB 4.0 L Turbo V8 | M | 83 | (Argentina) Luis Pérez Companc | All |
| (Italy) Richard Mille AF Corse | Ferrari 488 GTE Evo | Ferrari F154CB 4.0 L Turbo V8 | M | 83 | (Italy) Alessio Rovera | All |
| (Italy) Richard Mille AF Corse | Ferrari 488 GTE Evo | Ferrari F154CB 4.0 L Turbo V8 | M | 83 | (France) Lilou Wadoux | All |
| (Oman) ORT by TF | Aston Martin Vantage AMR | Aston Martin M177 4.0 L Turbo V8 | M | 25 | (Oman) Ahmad Al Harthy | All |
| (Oman) ORT by TF | Aston Martin Vantage AMR | Aston Martin M177 4.0 L Turbo V8 | M | 25 | (United States) Michael Dinan | All |
| (Oman) ORT by TF | Aston Martin Vantage AMR | Aston Martin M177 4.0 L Turbo V8 | M | 25 | (Republic of Ireland) Charlie Eastwood | All |
| (Japan) D'station Racing | Aston Martin Vantage AMR | Aston Martin M177 4.0 L Turbo V8 | M | 777 | (Japan) Tomonobu Fujii | All |
| (Japan) D'station Racing | Aston Martin Vantage AMR | Aston Martin M177 4.0 L Turbo V8 | M | 777 | (United Kingdom) Casper Stevenson | All |
| (Japan) D'station Racing | Aston Martin Vantage AMR | Aston Martin M177 4.0 L Turbo V8 | M | 777 | (Japan) Satoshi Hoshino | 1–6 |
| (Japan) D'station Racing | Aston Martin Vantage AMR | Aston Martin M177 4.0 L Turbo V8 | M | 777 | (Australia) Liam Talbot | 7 |
| (United States) Corvette Racing | Chevrolet Corvette C8.R | Chevrolet LT6.R 5.5 L V8 | M | 33 | (Netherlands) Nicky Catsburg | All |
| (United States) Corvette Racing | Chevrolet Corvette C8.R | Chevrolet LT6.R 5.5 L V8 | M | 33 | (United States) Ben Keating | All |
| (United States) Corvette Racing | Chevrolet Corvette C8.R | Chevrolet LT6.R 5.5 L V8 | M | 33 | (Argentina) Nicolás Varrone | All |
| (Germany) Project 1 – AO | Porsche 911 RSR-19 | Porsche M97/80 4.2 L Flat-6 | M | 56 | (Italy) Matteo Cairoli | All |
| (Germany) Project 1 – AO | Porsche 911 RSR-19 | Porsche M97/80 4.2 L Flat-6 | M | 56 | (United States) P. J. Hyett | 1, 3–4, 6–7 |
| (Germany) Project 1 – AO | Porsche 911 RSR-19 | Porsche M97/80 4.2 L Flat-6 | M | 56 | (United States) Gunnar Jeannette | 1, 3–4, 6–7 |
| (Germany) Project 1 – AO | Porsche 911 RSR-19 | Porsche M97/80 4.2 L Flat-6 | M | 56 | (Portugal) Guilherme Oliveira | 2, 5 |
| (Germany) Project 1 – AO | Porsche 911 RSR-19 | Porsche M97/80 4.2 L Flat-6 | M | 56 | (Portugal) Miguel Ramos | 2 |
| (Germany) Project 1 – AO | Porsche 911 RSR-19 | Porsche M97/80 4.2 L Flat-6 | M | 56 | (Dominican Republic) Efrin Castro | 5 |
| (Switzerland) Kessel Racing | Ferrari 488 GTE Evo | Ferrari F154CB 4.0 L Turbo V8 | M | 57 | (Japan) Takeshi Kimura | All |
| (Switzerland) Kessel Racing | Ferrari 488 GTE Evo | Ferrari F154CB 4.0 L Turbo V8 | M | 57 | (United States) Scott Huffaker | 1–6 |
| (Switzerland) Kessel Racing | Ferrari 488 GTE Evo | Ferrari F154CB 4.0 L Turbo V8 | M | 57 | (Brazil) Daniel Serra | 1–4, 7 |
| (Switzerland) Kessel Racing | Ferrari 488 GTE Evo | Ferrari F154CB 4.0 L Turbo V8 | M | 57 | (Japan) Kei Cozzolino | 5 |
| (Switzerland) Kessel Racing | Ferrari 488 GTE Evo | Ferrari F154CB 4.0 L Turbo V8 | M | 57 | (Japan) Ritomo Miyata | 6 |
| (Switzerland) Kessel Racing | Ferrari 488 GTE Evo | Ferrari F154CB 4.0 L Turbo V8 | M | 57 | (France) Esteban Masson | 7 |
| (Italy) Iron Lynx | Porsche 911 RSR-19 | Porsche M97/80 4.2 L Flat-6 | M | 60 | (Italy) Matteo Cressoni | All |
| (Italy) Iron Lynx | Porsche 911 RSR-19 | Porsche M97/80 4.2 L Flat-6 | M | 60 | (Belgium) Alessio Picariello | All |
| (Italy) Iron Lynx | Porsche 911 RSR-19 | Porsche M97/80 4.2 L Flat-6 | M | 60 | (Italy) Claudio Schiavoni | All |
| (Italy) Iron Dames | Porsche 911 RSR-19 | Porsche M97/80 4.2 L Flat-6 | M | 85 | (Belgium) Sarah Bovy | All |
| (Italy) Iron Dames | Porsche 911 RSR-19 | Porsche M97/80 4.2 L Flat-6 | M | 85 | (Switzerland) Rahel Frey | All |
| (Italy) Iron Dames | Porsche 911 RSR-19 | Porsche M97/80 4.2 L Flat-6 | M | 85 | (Denmark) Michelle Gatting | All |
| (Germany) Dempsey-Proton Racing | Porsche 911 RSR-19 | Porsche M97/80 4.2 L Flat-6 | M | 77 | (France) Julien Andlauer | All |
| (Germany) Dempsey-Proton Racing | Porsche 911 RSR-19 | Porsche M97/80 4.2 L Flat-6 | M | 77 | (Germany) Christian Ried | All |
| (Germany) Dempsey-Proton Racing | Porsche 911 RSR-19 | Porsche M97/80 4.2 L Flat-6 | M | 77 | (Denmark) Mikkel O. Pedersen | All |
| (Germany) Proton Competition | Porsche 911 RSR-19 | Porsche M97/80 4.2 L Flat-6 | M | 88 | (United Kingdom) Harry Tincknell | 1–4 |
| (Germany) Proton Competition | Porsche 911 RSR-19 | Porsche M97/80 4.2 L Flat-6 | M | 88 | (United States) Ryan Hardwick | 1–3 |
| (Germany) Proton Competition | Porsche 911 RSR-19 | Porsche M97/80 4.2 L Flat-6 | M | 88 | (Canada) Zacharie Robichon | 1–3 |
| (Germany) Proton Competition | Porsche 911 RSR-19 | Porsche M97/80 4.2 L Flat-6 | M | 88 | (Germany) Jonas Ried | 4 |
| (Germany) Proton Competition | Porsche 911 RSR-19 | Porsche M97/80 4.2 L Flat-6 | M | 88 | (United States) Don Yount | 4 |
| (United Kingdom) GR Racing | Porsche 911 RSR-19 | Porsche M97/80 4.2 L Flat-6 | M | 86 | (United Kingdom) Ben Barker | All |
| (United Kingdom) GR Racing | Porsche 911 RSR-19 | Porsche M97/80 4.2 L Flat-6 | M | 86 | (Italy) Riccardo Pera | All |
| (United Kingdom) GR Racing | Porsche 911 RSR-19 | Porsche M97/80 4.2 L Flat-6 | M | 86 | (United Kingdom) Michael Wainwright | All |
| (Canada) NorthWest AMR (Note: Paul Dalla Lana retired from racing and withdrew his NorthWest AMR team with immediate effect a week before the 6 Hours of Spa. Heart of Racing took over the entry, but kept the NorthWest AMR name and number to conform with the championship regulations.) | Aston Martin Vantage AMR | Aston Martin M177 4.0 L Turbo V8 | M | 98 | (Canada) Paul Dalla Lana | 1–2 |
| (Canada) NorthWest AMR | Aston Martin Vantage AMR | Aston Martin M177 4.0 L Turbo V8 | M | 98 | (Zimbabwe) Axcil Jefferies | 1–2 |
| (Canada) NorthWest AMR | Aston Martin Vantage AMR | Aston Martin M177 4.0 L Turbo V8 | M | 98 | (Denmark) Nicki Thiim | 1–2 |
| (Canada) NorthWest AMR | Aston Martin Vantage AMR | Aston Martin M177 4.0 L Turbo V8 | M | 98 | (United Kingdom) Ian James | 3–4, 6–7 |
| (Canada) NorthWest AMR | Aston Martin Vantage AMR | Aston Martin M177 4.0 L Turbo V8 | M | 98 | (Italy) Daniel Mancinelli | 3–4, 6–7 |
| (Canada) NorthWest AMR | Aston Martin Vantage AMR | Aston Martin M177 4.0 L Turbo V8 | M | 98 | (Spain) Alex Riberas | 3–4, 6–7 |

== Season report ==
=== 1000 Miles of Sebring ===
Ferrari's Antonio Fuoco drove the 499P to pole position in the season opener in Sebring, in what was Ferrari's first appearance in endurance racing in 50 years. Fuoco lead the field off the line, however was soon surpassed by both the Toyota entries. The #7 Toyota, driven by Kamui Kobayashi, took the lead at the 4 hour mark and was never headed. The #7 Toyota of Kobayashi, Mike Conway and José María López lead home the #8 Toyota of Sebastien Buemi, Brendon Hartley and Ryo Hirakawa by six seconds. The #50 Ferrari of Fuoco, Miguel Molina and Nicklas Nielsen finished 3rd, a lap down on the Toyota.

In LMP2, the Prema Racing #63 of Doriane Pin, Mirko Bortolotti and Daniil Kvyat lead with 5 minutes to go however had to pit for a splash of fuel. This handed the LMP2 victory to the #48 Jota of David Beckmann, Will Stevens and Yifei Ye, with the Prema finishing in 3rd. The #23 United Autosports lead for the first half of the race, but was forced to pit with technical issues. The #22 United Autosports of Filipe Alburquerque, Phil Hanson and Frederick Lubin snatched 2nd place with just minutes left.

The LMGTE AM saw drama in the races early stages. The #83 Richard Mille AF Corse Ferrari cartwheeled after colliding with the tyre wall. The sole Corvette entry of Nicky Catsburg, Ben Keating and Nicolas Varrone dominated the 2nd half of the race, taking victory. The #77 Dempsey-Proton Porsche capitalized on a late fuel stop by the #57 Kessel Racing Ferrari to take second position. The pole-sitting #85 Iron Dames Porsche led the first half of the race, before running off the road, dislodging bodywork.

=== 6 Hours of Portimao ===
The Hypercar class saw Toyota #7, in the hands of Conway, blast into the lead at the start, passing its pole-sitting sister machine. The #8 Toyota, driven by Buemi, lost a place to James Calado (Ferrari #50), however regained this position a lap later. Toyota management ordered the two cars to swap, however the #7 began suffering technical issues and pulled into the pits. This left the #8 Toyota to canter to victory. The #50 Ferrari finished 2nd, after holding off the #6 Porsche of Kevin Estre, Laurens Vanthoor and Andre Lotterer. The Vanwall entry had a brake calliper explode with Jacques Villeneuve at the wheel, which led to retirement.

The LMP2 qualifying session saw the Prema Racing #63 (Mirko Bortolotti) beat the Vector Racing #10 of Gabriel Aubry to pole by 0.001 seconds. Neither team had a role to play in the fight for victory, however. United Autosport #23 of Giedo van der Garde, Josh Pierson and Oliver Jarvis had their revenge after retiring from the lead at Sebring. They won the class ahead of the sister machine #22, despite having no radio for the final two hours.

The GTE AM Class saw the Corvette #33 grab pole position, but couldn't hold the lead in the race. The AF Corse #21 blasted into the lead at the start, but faded into the latter stages. This left the Corvette entry to battle for victory with the #83 Richard Mille Ferrari. The two cars were side-by-side in places on the final lap, but Catsburg narrowly edged Alessio Rovera to the flag, taking Corvette Racing's 2nd victory in succession. The #85 Iron Dames Porsche came through to finish 3rd.

=== 6 Hours of Spa Francorchamps ===
Qualifying saw drama in the Hypercar class, with the No. 8 Toyota of Hartley crashing out on cold tyres. Antonio Giovinazzi put the No. 51 Ferrari on pole, however saw his time stripped for a track limits violation. This promoted Kobayashi in the No. 7 Toyota to pole position, meaning Toyota had a car at the front and back of the field.

The race began in tricky conditions, and drivers had to decide which tyres to start the race on. Both Toyotas started on slicks, leaving Conway floundering at the start. Both Ferraris and a Cadillac passed Conway going into turn 1. The No. 3 Cadillac, driven by Renger van der Zande, crashed heavily at Eau Rouge after 2 hours. It was surmised that the car had a steering issue. Not long after, the No. 6 Porsche ground to a halt and into retirement after a strong showing. For the second race running, Jacques Villeneuve was driving the No. 4 Vanwall when forced to retire from the event. Villeneuve, chasing the No. 708 Glickenhaus, was clipped by the GTE Am No. 54 AF Corse Ferrari (Francesco Castellacci) at Blanchimont. The move pitched them both into the wall with about 2 hour 30 min remaining. An hour later, Fuoco crashed the No. 50 Ferrari just after its pit stop going down the hill to Eau Rouge. The car was running third after having to battle past the No. 2 Cadillac and No. 5 Porsche earlier. The No. 7 Toyota cantered to victory ahead of the sister car. It was the No. 7 car's 2nd victory of the season. The battle for 3rd place was settled on the final lap when the No. 51 Ferrari of Calado caught and passed the No. 5 Porsche of Frederic Makowiecki.

The No. 23 United Autosports car of Tom Blomqvist dominated the early stages of the race in LMP2. Hometown heroes Team WRT (running Nos. 31 and 41) both battled for supremacy, but the No. 41 of Rui Andrade, Robert Kubica and Louis Deletraz saw the chequered flag first. The team managed to pass the No. 23 United Autosport with 15 minutes remaining. The No. 63 Prema Racing was also in the running, but had to serve a 3-minute stop-and-go penalty. The penalty, for not respecting safety car procedures, was served with 30 minutes remaining, putting them out of contention.

The GTE Am class saw the No. 33 Corvette Racing battle with the No. 25 ORT by TF Aston Martin of Ahmad Al Harthy, Michael Dinan and Charlie Eastwood for the lead. They fought for position throughout the race, however, by the chequered flag it was a battle for second place. Lilou Wadoux, driving the No. 83 Richard Mille AF Corse, overtook the No. 88 Proton Competition at about half distance and was never headed. The No. 33 Corvette and No. 25 Aston Martin finished inline astern in second and third places, respectively. Wadoux became the first female driver to win a race in the World Endurance Championship.

=== 24 Hours of Le Mans ===
A Ferrari 499P shared by Antonio Fuoco, Miguel Molina and Nicklas Nielsen of Ferrari AF Corse started from pole position after Fuoco set the overall fastest lap in the Le Mans Hypercar class in the Hyperpole session. Their teammates James Calado, Antonio Giovinazzi and Alessandro Pier Guidi won overall after leading the final 55 laps. It was Calado, Giovinazzi and Pier Guidi's first overall Le Mans victory, as well as Ferrari's tenth and its first since 1965. Sébastien Buemi, Brendon Hartley and Ryō Hirakawa finished second in a Toyota GR010 Hybrid after battling Calado, Giovinazzi and Pier Guidi in the second half of the race. Cadillac Racing's Cadillac V-Series.R LMDh car, driven by Earl Bamber, Alex Lynn and Richard Westbrook, finished third overall.

Albert Costa, Fabio Scherer and Jakub Śmiechowski of Inter Europol Competition led the last 112 laps of the Le Mans Prototype 2 (LMP2) class in an Oreca 07-Gibson car to claim their maiden WEC class victory. Team WRT's Rui Andrade, Louis Delétraz and Robert Kubica finished second 21.015 seconds behind, while René Binder, Neel Jani and Nico Pino of Duqueine Team took third. Corvette Racing's Nicky Catsburg, Ben Keating and Nicolás Varrone in a Chevrolet Corvette C8.R came from two laps down after a second hour pit stop to replace a failed damper to win the final Le Mans Grand Touring Endurance Am (LMGTE Am) and GTE race at Le Mans, one lap ahead of ORT by TF's Aston Martin Vantage AMR shared by Ahmad Al Harthy, Michael Dinan and Charlie Eastwood.

Calado, Giovinazzi and Pier Guidi's victory moved them from fifth to second in the Hypercar Drivers' Championship, 25 points behind leaders Buemi, Hartley and Hirakawa. Andrande, Delétraz and Kubica remained the FIA Endurance Trophy for LMP2 Drivers leaders as category winners Costa, Scherer and Śmiechowski moved from sixth to second. Catsburg, Keating and Varrone extended their Endurance Trophy for LMGTE Am Teams lead over Al Harthy, Dinan and Eastwood. Toyota, the No. 41 Team WRT and No. 33 Corvette Racing teams left Le Mans as the respective Hypercar World Endurance Championship, Endurance Trophy for LMP2 Teams and Endurance Trophy for LMGTE Am Teams leaders with three races left in the season.

=== 6 Hours of Monza ===
The #7 Toyota of Kobayashi took pole in Hypercar, beating the #50 Ferrari by just 0.017 seconds, the smallest ever margin in world endurance championship history.

At the start of the race, the #93 Peugeot blasted into the lead in the early stages, whilst the #8 Toyota collided with the #51 Le Mans winning Ferrari. The #8 also collided with the #777 D'station Aston Martin, with the #777 suffering a heavy impact. The #8 was given a one-minute stop and go penalty for the incidents. However, in the end, the #7 Toyota claimed its third win of the season, finishing ahead of the #50 Ferrari and the #93 Peugeot.

In LMP2, the #28 Jota took their first victory of the season. The Alpine #36 beat the pole-sitting #41 Team WRT to second place.

The GTE AM class saw Corvette Racing's #33 crew of Nicky Catsburg, Ben Keating and Nico Varrone seal the class world championship title by finishing 4th in class. Proton-Dempsey Porsche #77 took the victory ahead of the Iron Lynx #60 and GR Racing #86 Porsches. The pole-sitting #85 Iron Dames Porsche finished 5th.

== Results and standings ==
=== Race results ===
The highest finishing competitor entered in the World Endurance Championship is listed below. Invitational entries may have finished ahead of WEC competitors in individual races.

| Rnd. | Circuit | Hypercar Winners | LMP2 Winners | LMGTE Am Winners | Report |
|---|---|---|---|---|---|
| 1 | (United States) Sebring | (Japan) No. 7 Toyota Gazoo Racing | (United Kingdom) No. 22 United Autosports (Note: The LMP2 class winner for Sebring was the No. 48 Hertz Team Jota invitational entry. As it was not a full-season WEC entrant, the points for the win were awarded to the No. 22 United Autosports entry.) | (United States) No. 33 Corvette Racing | Report |
| 1 | (United States) Sebring | (United Kingdom) Mike Conway (Japan) Kamui Kobayashi (Argentina) José María López | (Portugal) Filipe Albuquerque (United Kingdom) Phil Hanson (United Kingdom) Frederick Lubin | (Netherlands) Nicky Catsburg (United States) Ben Keating (Argentina) Nicolás Varrone | Report |
| 2 | (Portugal) Portimão | (Japan) No. 8 Toyota Gazoo Racing | (United Kingdom) No. 23 United Autosports | (United States) No. 33 Corvette Racing | Report |
| 2 | (Portugal) Portimão | (Switzerland) Sébastien Buemi (New Zealand) Brendon Hartley (Japan) Ryō Hirakawa | (Netherlands) Giedo van der Garde (United Kingdom) Oliver Jarvis (United States) Josh Pierson | (Netherlands) Nicky Catsburg (United States) Ben Keating (Argentina) Nicolás Varrone | Report |
| 3 | (Belgium) Spa | (Japan) No. 7 Toyota Gazoo Racing | (Belgium) No. 41 Team WRT | (Italy) No. 83 Richard Mille AF Corse | Report |
| 3 | (Belgium) Spa | (United Kingdom) Mike Conway (Japan) Kamui Kobayashi (Argentina) José María López | (Angola) Rui Andrade (Switzerland) Louis Delétraz (Poland) Robert Kubica | (Argentina) Luis Pérez Companc (Italy) Alessio Rovera (France) Lilou Wadoux | Report |
| 4 | (France) Le Mans | (Italy) No. 51 Ferrari AF Corse | (Poland) No. 34 Inter Europol Competition | (United States) No. 33 Corvette Racing | Report |
| 4 | (France) Le Mans | (United Kingdom) James Calado (Italy) Antonio Giovinazzi (Italy) Alessandro Pier Guidi | (Spain) Albert Costa (Switzerland) Fabio Scherer (Poland) Jakub Śmiechowski | (Netherlands) Nicky Catsburg (United States) Ben Keating (Argentina) Nicolás Varrone | Report |
| 5 | (Italy) Monza | (Japan) No. 7 Toyota Gazoo Racing | (United Kingdom) No. 28 Jota | (Germany) No. 77 Dempsey - Proton Competition | Report |
| 5 | (Italy) Monza | (United Kingdom) Mike Conway (Japan) Kamui Kobayashi (Argentina) José María López | (Brazil) Pietro Fittipaldi (Denmark) David Heinemeier Hansson (Denmark) Oliver Rasmussen | (Germany) Christian Ried (Denmark) Mikkel O. Pedersen (France) Julien Andlauer | Report |
| 6 | (Japan) Fuji | (Japan) No. 7 Toyota Gazoo Racing | (Belgium) No. 41 Team WRT | (Italy) No. 54 AF Corse | Report |
| 6 | (Japan) Fuji | (United Kingdom) Mike Conway (Japan) Kamui Kobayashi (Argentina) José María López | (Angola) Rui Andrade (Switzerland) Louis Delétraz (Poland) Robert Kubica | (Italy) Francesco Castellacci (Switzerland) Thomas Flohr (Italy) Davide Rigon | Report |
| 7 | Bahrain | (Japan) No. 8 Toyota Gazoo Racing | (Belgium) No. 41 Team WRT | (Italy) No. 85 Iron Dames | Report |
| 7 | Bahrain | (Switzerland) Sébastien Buemi (New Zealand) Brendon Hartley (Japan) Ryō Hirakawa | (Angola) Rui Andrade (Switzerland) Louis Delétraz (Poland) Robert Kubica | (Belgium) Sarah Bovy (Switzerland) Rahel Frey (Denmark) Michelle Gatting | Report |

=== Drivers' championships ===
Three titles were offered to drivers, one with world championship status. The Hypercar World Endurance Drivers' Championship was reserved for Hypercar drivers while FIA Endurance Trophies were awarded for LMP2 and LMGTE Am Drivers.

Points systems
| Duration | 1st | 2nd | 3rd | 4th | 5th | 6th | 7th | 8th | 9th | 10th | Pole |
|---|---|---|---|---|---|---|---|---|---|---|---|
| 6 Hours | 25 | 18 | 15 | 12 | 10 | 8 | 6 | 4 | 2 | 1 | 1 |
| 8 Hours | 38 | 27 | 23 | 18 | 15 | 12 | 9 | 6 | 3 | 2 | 1 |
| 24 Hours | 50 | 36 | 30 | 24 | 20 | 16 | 12 | 8 | 4 | 2 | 1 |

==== Hypercar World Endurance Drivers' Championship ====
| Pos. | Driver | Team | SEB (United States) | POR (Portugal) | SPA (Belgium) | LMS (France) | MNZ (Italy) | FUJ (Japan) | BHR (Bahrain) | Points |
|---|---|---|---|---|---|---|---|---|---|---|
| 1 | (Switzerland) Sébastien Buemi | (Japan) Toyota Gazoo Racing | 2 | **1** | 2 | 2 | 6 | 2 | **1** | 172 |
| 1 | (New Zealand) Brendon Hartley | (Japan) Toyota Gazoo Racing | 2 | **1** | 2 | 2 | 6 | 2 | **1** | 172 |
| 1 | (Japan) Ryō Hirakawa | (Japan) Toyota Gazoo Racing | 2 | **1** | 2 | 2 | 6 | 2 | **1** | 172 |
| 2 | (United Kingdom) Mike Conway | (Japan) Toyota Gazoo Racing | 1 | 9 | **1** | Ret | **1** | **1** | 2 | 145 |
| 2 | (Japan) Kamui Kobayashi | (Japan) Toyota Gazoo Racing | 1 | 9 | **1** | Ret | **1** | **1** | 2 | 145 |
| 2 | (Argentina) José María López | (Japan) Toyota Gazoo Racing | 1 | 9 | **1** | Ret | **1** | **1** | 2 | 145 |
| 3 | (Italy) Antonio Fuoco | (Italy) Ferrari AF Corse | **3** | 2 | Ret | **4** | 2 | 4 | 3 | 120 |
| 3 | (Spain) Miguel Molina | (Italy) Ferrari AF Corse | **3** | 2 | Ret | **4** | 2 | 4 | 3 | 120 |
| 3 | (Denmark) Nicklas Nielsen | (Italy) Ferrari AF Corse | **3** | 2 | Ret | **4** | 2 | 4 | 3 | 120 |
| 4 | (United Kingdom) James Calado | (Italy) Ferrari AF Corse | 7 | 6 | 3 | 1 | 5 | 5 | 6 | 114 |
| 4 | (Italy) Antonio Giovinazzi | (Italy) Ferrari AF Corse | 7 | 6 | 3 | 1 | 5 | 5 | 6 | 114 |
| 4 | (Italy) Alessandro Pier Guidi | (Italy) Ferrari AF Corse | 7 | 6 | 3 | 1 | 5 | 5 | 6 | 114 |
| 5 | (New Zealand) Earl Bamber | (United States) Cadillac Racing | 4 | 4 | 5 | 3 | 10 | 10 | 11 | 72 |
| 5 | (United Kingdom) Alex Lynn | (United States) Cadillac Racing | 4 | 4 | 5 | 3 | 10 | 10 | 11 | 72 |
| 5 | (United Kingdom) Richard Westbrook | (United States) Cadillac Racing | 4 | 4 | 5 | 3 | 10 | 10 | 11 | 72 |
| 6 | (France) Kévin Estre | (Germany) Porsche Penske Motorsport | 6 | 3 | Ret | 8 | 7 | 3 | 5 | 71 |
| 6 | (Germany) André Lotterer | (Germany) Porsche Penske Motorsport | 6 | 3 | Ret | 8 | 7 | 3 | 5 | 71 |
| 6 | (Belgium) Laurens Vanthoor | (Germany) Porsche Penske Motorsport | 6 | 3 | Ret | 8 | 7 | 3 | 5 | 71 |
| 7 | (United States) Dane Cameron | (Germany) Porsche Penske Motorsport | 5 | 10 | 4 | 7 | 4 | 12 | 7 | 61 |
| 7 | (Denmark) Michael Christensen | (Germany) Porsche Penske Motorsport | 5 | 10 | 4 | 7 | 4 | 12 | 7 | 61 |
| 7 | (France) Frédéric Makowiecki | (Germany) Porsche Penske Motorsport | 5 | 10 | 4 | 7 | 4 | 12 | 7 | 61 |
| 8 | (Denmark) Mikkel Jensen | (France) Peugeot TotalEnergies | 9 | 7 | 8 | 6 | 3 | 8 | 9 | 51 |
| 8 | (United Kingdom) Paul di Resta | (France) Peugeot TotalEnergies | 9 | 7 | 8 | 6 | 3 | 8 | 9 | 51 |
| 8 | (France) Jean-Éric Vergne | (France) Peugeot TotalEnergies | 9 | 7 | 8 | 6 | 3 | 8 | 9 | 51 |
| 9 | (Portugal) António Félix da Costa | (United Kingdom) Hertz Team Jota | | | 6 | 10 | 9 | 6 | 4 | 38 |
| 9 | (United Kingdom) Will Stevens | (United Kingdom) Hertz Team Jota | | | 6 | 10 | 9 | 6 | 4 | 38 |
| 9 | (China) Yifei Ye | (United Kingdom) Hertz Team Jota | | | 6 | 10 | 9 | 6 | 4 | 38 |
| 10 | (France) Romain Dumas | (United States) Glickenhaus Racing | Ret | 8 | 7 | 5 | 8 | | | 34 |
| 10 | (France) Olivier Pla | (United States) Glickenhaus Racing | Ret | 8 | 7 | 5 | 8 | | | 34 |
| 11 | (France) Loïc Duval | (France) Peugeot TotalEnergies | NC | 5 | 9 | 9 | 11 | 7 | 8 | 28 |
| 11 | (United States) Gustavo Menezes | (France) Peugeot TotalEnergies | NC | 5 | 9 | 9 | 11 | 7 | 8 | 28 |
| 12 | (Australia) Ryan Briscoe | (United States) Glickenhaus Racing | Ret | 8 | | 5 | | | | 24 |
| 12 | (Australia) Ryan Briscoe | (Austria) Floyd Vanwall Racing Team | | | | | | | 12 | 24 |
| 13 | (Switzerland) Nico Müller | (France) Peugeot TotalEnergies | NC | 5 | 9 | 9 | 11 | | 8 | 22 |
| 14 | (France) Franck Mailleux | (United States) Glickenhaus Racing | | | 7 | | | | | 6 |
| 15 | (Belgium) Stoffel Vandoorne | (France) Peugeot TotalEnergies | | | | | | 7 | | 6 |
| 16 | (Argentina) Esteban Guerrieri | (Austria) Floyd Vanwall Racing Team | 8 | Ret | Ret | Ret | 12 | 11 | 12 | 6 |
| 17 | (France) Tom Dillmann | (Austria) Floyd Vanwall Racing Team | 8 | Ret | Ret | Ret | | | | 6 |
| 18 | (Canada) Jacques Villeneuve | (Austria) Floyd Vanwall Racing Team | 8 | Ret | Ret | | | | | 6 |
| 19 | (France) Nathanaël Berthon | (United States) Glickenhaus Racing | | | | | 8 | | | 4 |
| 20 | (Italy) Gianmaria Bruni | (Germany) Proton Competition | | | | | Ret | 9 | 10 | 4 |
| 20 | (Switzerland) Neel Jani | (Germany) Proton Competition | | | | | Ret | 9 | 10 | 4 |
| 20 | (United Kingdom) Harry Tincknell | (Germany) Proton Competition | | | | | Ret | 9 | 10 | 4 |
| 21 | (France) Tristan Vautier | (Austria) Floyd Vanwall Racing Team | | | | Ret | 12 | 11 | 12 | 0 |
| 22 | (Brazil) João Paulo de Oliveira | (Austria) Floyd Vanwall Racing Team | | | | | 12 | 11 | | 0 |
| Pos. | Driver | Team | SEB (United States) | POR (Portugal) | SPA (Belgium) | LMS (France) | MNZ (Italy) | FUJ (Japan) | BHR (Bahrain) | Points |

| Colour | Result |
|---|---|
| Gold | Winner |
| Silver | Second place |
| Bronze | Third place |
| Green | Points classification |
| Blue | Non-points classification |
| Blue | Non-classified finish (NC) |
| Purple | Retired, not classified (Ret) |
| Red | Did not qualify (DNQ) |
| Red | Did not pre-qualify (DNPQ) |
| Black | Disqualified (DSQ) |
| White | Did not start (DNS) |
| White | Withdrew (WD) |
| White | Race cancelled (C) |
| Blank | Did not practice (DNP) |
| Blank | Did not arrive (DNA) |
| Blank | Excluded (EX) |

**Bold** - Pole position

==== FIA Endurance Trophy for LMP2 Drivers ====
| Pos. | Driver | Team | SEB (United States) | POR (Portugal) | SPA (Belgium) | LMS (France) | MNZ (Italy) | FUJ (Japan) | BHR (Bahrain) | Points |
|---|---|---|---|---|---|---|---|---|---|---|
| 1 | (Angola) Rui Andrade | (Belgium) Team WRT | 4 | 3 | 1 | 2 | **3** | 1 | 1 | 173 |
| 1 | (Switzerland) Louis Delétraz | (Belgium) Team WRT | 4 | 3 | 1 | 2 | **3** | 1 | 1 | 173 |
| 1 | (Poland) Robert Kubica | (Belgium) Team WRT | 4 | 3 | 1 | 2 | **3** | 1 | 1 | 173 |
| 2 | (Spain) Albert Costa | (Poland) Inter Europol Competition | 3 | 9 | 3 | 1 | 5 | 9 | 6 | 114 |
| 2 | (Switzerland) Fabio Scherer | (Poland) Inter Europol Competition | 3 | 9 | 3 | 1 | 5 | 9 | 6 | 114 |
| 2 | (Poland) Jakub Śmiechowski | (Poland) Inter Europol Competition | 3 | 9 | 3 | 1 | 5 | 9 | 6 | 114 |
| 3 | (United Kingdom) Phil Hanson | (United Kingdom) United Autosports | 1 | 2 | 5 | 8 | 6 | **2** | 9 | 104 |
| 3 | (United Kingdom) Frederick Lubin | (United Kingdom) United Autosports | 1 | 2 | 5 | 8 | 6 | **2** | 9 | 104 |
| 4 | (Netherlands) Robin Frijns | (Belgium) Team WRT | 6 | 6 | 6 | 4 | Ret | 3 | 2 | 94 |
| 4 | (Indonesia) Sean Gelael | (Belgium) Team WRT | 6 | 6 | 6 | 4 | Ret | 3 | 2 | 94 |
| 4 | (Austria) Ferdinand Habsburg | (Belgium) Team WRT | 6 | 6 | 6 | 4 | Ret | 3 | 2 | 94 |
| 5 | (United Kingdom) Oliver Jarvis | (United Kingdom) United Autosports | **Ret** | 1 | **2** | 6 | 4 | 4 | **8** | 92 |
| 5 | (United States) Josh Pierson | (United Kingdom) United Autosports | **Ret** | 1 | **2** | 6 | 4 | 4 | **8** | 92 |
| 6 | (Brazil) Pietro Fittipaldi | (United Kingdom) Jota | 5 | 7 | 9 | **9** | 1 | 6 | 3 | 84 |
| 6 | (Denmark) David Heinemeier Hansson | (United Kingdom) Jota | 5 | 7 | 9 | **9** | 1 | 6 | 3 | 84 |
| 6 | (Denmark) Oliver Rasmussen | (United Kingdom) Jota | 5 | 7 | 9 | **9** | 1 | 6 | 3 | 84 |
| 7 | (France) Julien Canal | (France) Alpine Elf Team | 8 | 8 | 7 | 3 | 2 | 5 | 7 | 83 |
| 7 | (France) Charles Milesi | (France) Alpine Elf Team | 8 | 8 | 7 | 3 | 2 | 5 | 7 | 83 |
| 7 | (France) Matthieu Vaxivière | (France) Alpine Elf Team | 8 | 8 | 7 | 3 | 2 | 5 | 7 | 83 |
| 8 | (Portugal) Filipe Albuquerque | (United Kingdom) United Autosports | 1 | | 5 | 8 | | **2** | 9 | 78 |
| 9 | Daniil Kvyat | (Italy) Prema Racing | 2 | **4** | 10 | Ret | 7 | 10 | 5 | 63 |
| 9 | (France) Doriane Pin | (Italy) Prema Racing | 2 | **4** | 10 | Ret | 7 | 10 | 5 | 63 |
| 10 | (Romania) Filip Ugran | (Italy) Prema Racing | 7 | 5 | 4 | 10 | 9 | 8 | 4 | 57 |
| 10 | (Netherlands) Bent Viscaal | (Italy) Prema Racing | 7 | 5 | 4 | 10 | 9 | 8 | 4 | 57 |
| 11 | (Italy) Mirko Bortolotti | (Italy) Prema Racing | 2 | **4** | 10 | Ret | | | 5 | 56 |
| 12 | (United Kingdom) Tom Blomqvist | (United Kingdom) United Autosports | **Ret** | | **2** | 6 | | | **8** | 43 |
| 13 | (United Kingdom) Ben Hanley | (United Kingdom) United Autosports | | 2 | | | 6 | 4 | | 38 |
| 14 | (Netherlands) Giedo van der Garde | (United Kingdom) United Autosports | | 1 | | | 4 | | | 37 |
| 15 | (United States) Juan Manuel Correa | (Italy) Prema Racing | | 5 | | 10 | | 8 | 4 | 34 |
| 16 | (France) Gabriel Aubry | (United Kingdom) Vector Sport | 9 | 11 | Ret | 5 | Ret | 7 | NC | 29 |
| 16 | (Republic of Ireland) Ryan Cullen | (United Kingdom) Vector Sport | 9 | 11 | Ret | 5 | Ret | 7 | NC | 29 |
| 16 | (Liechtenstein) Matthias Kaiser | (United Kingdom) Vector Sport | 9 | 11 | Ret | 5 | Ret | 7 | NC | 29 |
| 17 | (Italy) Andrea Caldarelli | (Italy) Prema Racing | 7 | | 4 | | 9 | 10 | | 24 |
| 18 | (United Kingdom) Olli Caldwell | (France) Alpine Elf Team | Ret | 10 | 8 | 7 | 8 | 11 | 10 | 23 |
| 18 | (Brazil) André Negrão | (France) Alpine Elf Team | Ret | 10 | 8 | 7 | 8 | 11 | 10 | 23 |
| 18 | (Mexico) Memo Rojas | (France) Alpine Elf Team | Ret | 10 | 8 | 7 | 8 | 11 | 10 | 23 |
| 19 | (Switzerland) Mathias Beche | (Italy) Prema Racing | | | | | 7 | | | 6 |
| Pos. | Driver | Team | SEB (United States) | POR (Portugal) | SPA (Belgium) | LMS (France) | MNZ (Italy) | FUJ (Japan) | BHR (Bahrain) | Points |

==== FIA Endurance Trophy for LMGTE Am Drivers ====
| Pos. | Driver | Team | SEB (United States) | POR (Portugal) | SPA (Belgium) | LMS (France) | MNZ (Italy) | FUJ (Japan) | BHR (Bahrain) | Points |
|---|---|---|---|---|---|---|---|---|---|---|
| 1 | (Netherlands) Nicky Catsburg | (United States) Corvette Racing | 1 | **1** | 2 | **1** | 4 | **2** | 7 | 173 |
| 1 | (United States) Ben Keating | (United States) Corvette Racing | 1 | **1** | 2 | **1** | 4 | **2** | 7 | 173 |
| 1 | (Argentina) Nicolás Varrone | (United States) Corvette Racing | 1 | **1** | 2 | **1** | 4 | **2** | 7 | 173 |
| 2 | (Belgium) Sarah Bovy | (Italy) Iron Dames | **8** | 3 | 5 | 4 | **5** | 4 | **1** | 118 |
| 2 | (Switzerland) Rahel Frey | (Italy) Iron Dames | **8** | 3 | 5 | 4 | **5** | 4 | **1** | 118 |
| 2 | (Denmark) Michelle Gatting | (Italy) Iron Dames | **8** | 3 | 5 | 4 | **5** | 4 | **1** | 118 |
| 3 | (Italy) Francesco Castellacci | (Italy) AF Corse | 5 | 4 | NC | 5 | 10 | 1 | 4 | 91 |
| 3 | (Switzerland) Thomas Flohr | (Italy) AF Corse | 5 | 4 | NC | 5 | 10 | 1 | 4 | 91 |
| 3 | (Italy) Davide Rigon | (Italy) AF Corse | 5 | 4 | NC | 5 | 10 | 1 | 4 | 91 |
| 4 | (France) Julien Andlauer | (Germany) Dempsey-Proton Racing | 2 | 7 | 9 | Ret | 1 | 6 | 6 | 80 |
| 4 | (Germany) Christian Ried | (Germany) Dempsey-Proton Racing | 2 | 7 | 9 | Ret | 1 | 6 | 6 | 80 |
| 4 | (Denmark) Mikkel O. Pedersen | (Germany) Dempsey-Proton Racing | 2 | 7 | 9 | Ret | 1 | 6 | 6 | 80 |
| 5 | (Oman) Ahmad Al Harthy | (Oman) ORT by TF | 9 | 8 | **3** | 2 | 7 | 13 | NC | 65 |
| 5 | (United States) Michael Dinan | (Oman) ORT by TF | 9 | 8 | **3** | 2 | 7 | 13 | NC | 65 |
| 5 | (Republic of Ireland) Charlie Eastwood | (Oman) ORT by TF | 9 | 8 | **3** | 2 | 7 | 13 | NC | 65 |
| 6 | (United Kingdom) Ben Barker | (United Kingdom) GR Racing | 7 | 11 | 12 | 3 | 3 | 8 | 8 | 64 |
| 6 | (Italy) Riccardo Pera | (United Kingdom) GR Racing | 7 | 11 | 12 | 3 | 3 | 8 | 8 | 64 |
| 6 | (United Kingdom) Michael Wainwright | (United Kingdom) GR Racing | 7 | 11 | 12 | 3 | 3 | 8 | 8 | 64 |
| 7 | (Japan) Takeshi Kimura | (Switzerland) Kessel Racing | 3 | 10 | 8 | Ret | Ret | 3 | 5 | 58 |
| 8 | (Argentina) Luis Pérez Companc | (Italy) Richard Mille AF Corse | Ret | 2 | 1 | Ret | 6 | 9 | 9 | 56 |
| 8 | (Italy) Alessio Rovera | (Italy) Richard Mille AF Corse | Ret | 2 | 1 | Ret | 6 | 9 | 9 | 56 |
| 8 | (France) Lilou Wadoux | (Italy) Richard Mille AF Corse | Ret | 2 | 1 | Ret | 6 | 9 | 9 | 56 |
| 9 | (Italy) Daniel Mancinelli | (Canada) NorthWest AMR | | | 7 | 6 | | 7 | 3 | 51 |
| 9 | (Spain) Alex Riberas | (Canada) NorthWest AMR | | | 7 | 6 | | 7 | 3 | 51 |
| 9 | (United Kingdom) Ian James | (Canada) NorthWest AMR | | | 7 | 6 | | 7 | 3 | 51 |
| 10 | (United States) Scott Huffaker | (Switzerland) Kessel Racing | 3 | 10 | 8 | Ret | Ret | 3 | | 43 |
| 11 | (Brazil) Daniel Serra | (Switzerland) Kessel Racing | 3 | 10 | 8 | Ret | | | 5 | 43 |
| 12 | (United States) Simon Mann | (Italy) AF Corse | 4 | 5 | 6 | Ret | 9 | 12 | 11 | 38 |
| 12 | (Belgium) Ulysse de Pauw | (Italy) AF Corse | 4 | 5 | 6 | Ret | 9 | | | 38 |
| 13 | (Italy) Matteo Cairoli | (Germany) Project 1 – AO | 12 | 6 | WD | 7 | 8 | 5 | 10 | 36 |
| 14 | (Japan) Tomonobu Fujii | (Japan) D'station Racing | 10 | NC | 10 | Ret | Ret | 10 | 2 | 31 |
| 14 | (United Kingdom) Casper Stevenson | (Japan) D'station Racing | 10 | NC | 10 | Ret | Ret | 10 | 2 | 31 |
| 15 | (Italy) Matteo Cressoni | (Italy) Iron Lynx | 6 | 12 | 11 | Ret | 2 | 11 | Ret | 30 |
| 15 | (Belgium) Alessio Picariello | (Italy) Iron Lynx | 6 | 12 | 11 | Ret | 2 | 11 | Ret | 30 |
| 15 | (Italy) Claudio Schiavoni | (Italy) Iron Lynx | 6 | 12 | 11 | Ret | 2 | 11 | Ret | 30 |
| 16 | (Australia) Liam Talbot | (Japan) D'station Racing | | | | | | | 2 | 27 |
| 17 | (United States) P. J. Hyett | (Germany) Project 1 – AO | 12 | | WD | 7 | | 5 | 10 | 24 |
| 17 | (United States) Gunnar Jeannette | (Germany) Project 1 – AO | 12 | | WD | 7 | | 5 | 10 | 24 |
| 18 | (Italy) Stefano Costantini | (Italy) AF Corse | 4 | | | Ret | | | | 18 |
| 19 | (Italy) Diego Alessi | (Italy) AF Corse | | 5 | 6 | Ret | | | | 18 |
| 20 | (Japan) Ritomo Miyata | (Switzerland) Kessel Racing | | | | | | 3 | | 15 |
| 21 | (France) Esteban Masson | (Switzerland) Kessel Racing | | | | | | | 5 | 15 |
| 22 | (United Kingdom) Harry Tincknell | (Germany) Proton Competition | WD | 9 | 4 | Ret | | | | 14 |
| 22 | (United States) Ryan Hardwick | (Germany) Proton Competition | WD | 9 | 4 | | | | | 14 |
| 22 | (Canada) Zacharie Robichon | (Germany) Proton Competition | WD | 9 | 4 | | | | | 14 |
| 23 | (Portugal) Guilherme Oliveira | (Germany) Project 1 – AO | | 6 | | | 8 | | | 12 |
| 24 | (Portugal) Miguel Ramos | (Germany) Project 1 – AO | | 6 | | | | | | 8 |
| 25 | (Dominican Republic) Efrin Castro | (Germany) Project 1 – AO | | | | | 8 | | | 4 |
| 26 | (Japan) Satoshi Hoshino | (Japan) D'station Racing | 10 | NC | 10 | Ret | Ret | 10 | | 4 |
| 27 | (France) Julien Piguet | (Italy) AF Corse | | | | Ret | 9 | | | 2 |
| 28 | (Japan) Kei Cozzolino | (Switzerland) Kessel Racing | | | | | Ret | | | 0 |
| 28 | (Japan) Kei Cozzolino | (Italy) AF Corse | | | | | | 12 | 11 | 0 |
| 29 | (Canada) Paul Dalla Lana | (Canada) NorthWest AMR | 11 | 13 | | | | | | 0 |
| 29 | (Zimbabwe) Axcil Jefferies | (Canada) NorthWest AMR | 11 | 13 | | | | | | 0 |
| 29 | (Denmark) Nicki Thiim | (Canada) NorthWest AMR | 11 | 13 | | | | | | 0 |
| 30 | (France) Franck Dezoteux | (Italy) AF Corse | | | | | | | 11 | 0 |
| 31 | (Japan) Hiroshi Koizumi | (Italy) AF Corse | | | | | | 12 | | 0 |
| 32 | (Germany) Jonas Ried | (Germany) Proton Competition | | | | Ret | | | | 0 |
| 32 | (United States) Don Yount | (Germany) Proton Competition | | | | Ret | | | | 0 |
| Pos. | Driver | Team | SEB (United States) | POR (Portugal) | SPA (Belgium) | LMS (France) | MNZ (Italy) | FUJ (Japan) | BHR (Bahrain) | Points |

=== Manufacturers' and teams' championships ===
A world championship was awarded for Hypercar manufacturers. An FIA World Cup was awarded for customer Hypercar class teams. FIA Endurance Trophies were awarded for LMP2 and LMGTE Am teams.

==== Hypercar World Endurance Manufacturers' Championship ====
Points were awarded only to the highest finishing competitor from each manufacturer. Privateer entries are made invisible.

| Pos. | Manufacturer | SEB (United States) | POR (Portugal) | SPA (Belgium) | LMS (France) | MNZ (Italy) | FUJ (Japan) | BHR (Bahrain) | Points |
|---|---|---|---|---|---|---|---|---|---|
| 1 | (Japan) Toyota | 1 | **1** | **1** | 2 | **1** | **1** | **1** | 217 |
| 2 | (Italy) Ferrari | **3** | 2 | 3 | **1** | 2 | 4 | 3 | 161 |
| 3 | (Germany) Porsche | 5 | 3 | 4 | 7 | 4 | 3 | 4 | 99 |
| 4 | (United States) Cadillac | 4 | 4 | 5 | 3 | 9 | 8 | 9 | 79 |
| 5 | (France) Peugeot | 9 | 5 | 7 | 6 | 3 | 6 | 7 | 67 |
| 6 | (United States) Glickenhaus | Ret | 8 | 6 | 5 | 8 | | | 36 |
| 7 | (Austria) Vanwall | 8 | Ret | Ret | Ret | 11 | 9 | 10 | 10 |
| Pos. | Manufacturer | SEB (United States) | POR (Portugal) | SPA (Belgium) | LMS (France) | MNZ (Italy) | FUJ (Japan) | BHR (Bahrain) | Points |

==== FIA World Cup for Hypercar Teams ====
| Pos. | Car | Team | SEB (United States) | POR (Portugal) | SPA (Belgium) | LMS (France) | MNZ (Italy) | FUJ (Japan) | BHR (Bahrain) | Points |
|---|---|---|---|---|---|---|---|---|---|---|
| 1 | 38 | (United Kingdom) Hertz Team Jota | | | 1 | 1 | 1 | 1 | 1 | 163 |
| 2 | 99 | (Germany) Proton Competition | | | | | Ret | 2 | 2 | 45 |
| Pos. | Car | Team | SEB (United States) | POR (Portugal) | SPA (Belgium) | LMS (France) | MNZ (Italy) | FUJ (Japan) | BHR (Bahrain) | Points |

==== FIA Endurance Trophy for LMP2 Teams ====
| Pos. | Car | Team | SEB (United States) | POR (Portugal) | SPA (Belgium) | LMS (France) | MNZ (Italy) | FUJ (Japan) | BHR (Bahrain) | Points |
|---|---|---|---|---|---|---|---|---|---|---|
| 1 | 41 | (Belgium) Team WRT | 4 | 3 | 1 | 2 | **3** | 1 | 1 | 173 |
| 2 | 34 | (Poland) Inter Europol Competition | 3 | 9 | 3 | 1 | 5 | 9 | 6 | 114 |
| 3 | 22 | (United Kingdom) United Autosports | 1 | 2 | 5 | 8 | 6 | **2** | 9 | 104 |
| 4 | 31 | (Belgium) Team WRT | 6 | 6 | 6 | 4 | Ret | 3 | 2 | 94 |
| 5 | 23 | (United Kingdom) United Autosports | **Ret** | 1 | **2** | 6 | 4 | 4 | **8** | 92 |
| 6 | 28 | (United Kingdom) Jota | 5 | 7 | 9 | **9** | 1 | 6 | 3 | 84 |
| 7 | 36 | (France) Alpine Elf Team | 8 | 8 | 7 | 3 | 2 | 5 | 7 | 83 |
| 8 | 63 | (Italy) Prema Racing | 2 | **4** | 10 | Ret | 7 | 10 | 5 | 63 |
| 9 | 9 | (Italy) Prema Racing | 7 | 5 | 4 | 10 | 9 | 8 | 4 | 57 |
| 10 | 10 | (United Kingdom) Vector Sport | 9 | 11 | Ret | 5 | Ret | 7 | NC | 29 |
| 11 | 35 | (France) Alpine Elf Team | Ret | 10 | 8 | 7 | 8 | 11 | 10 | 23 |
| Pos. | Car | Team | SEB (United States) | POR (Portugal) | SPA (Belgium) | LMS (France) | MNZ (Italy) | FUJ (Japan) | BHR (Bahrain) | Points |

==== FIA Endurance Trophy for LMGTE Am Teams ====
| Pos. | Car | Team | SEB (United States) | POR (Portugal) | SPA (Belgium) | LMS (France) | MNZ (Italy) | FUJ (Japan) | BHR (Bahrain) | Points |
|---|---|---|---|---|---|---|---|---|---|---|
| 1 | 33 | (United States) Corvette Racing | 1 | **1** | 2 | **1** | 4 | **2** | 7 | 173 |
| 2 | 85 | (Italy) Iron Dames | **8** | 3 | 5 | 4 | **5** | 4 | **1** | 118 |
| 3 | 54 | (Italy) AF Corse | 5 | 4 | NC | 5 | 10 | 1 | 4 | 91 |
| 4 | 77 | (Germany) Dempsey-Proton Racing | 2 | 7 | 9 | Ret | 1 | 6 | 6 | 80 |
| 5 | 25 | (Oman) ORT by TF | 9 | 8 | **3** | 2 | 7 | 13 | NC | 65 |
| 6 | 86 | (United Kingdom) GR Racing | 7 | 11 | 12 | 3 | 3 | 8 | 8 | 64 |
| 7 | 57 | (Switzerland) Kessel Racing | 3 | 10 | 8 | Ret | Ret | 3 | 5 | 58 |
| 8 | 83 | (Italy) Richard Mille AF Corse | Ret | 2 | 1 | Ret | 6 | 9 | 9 | 56 |
| 9 | 98 | (Canada) NorthWest AMR | 11 | 13 | 7 | 6 | | 7 | 3 | 51 |
| 10 | 21 | (Italy) AF Corse | 4 | 5 | 6 | Ret | 9 | 12 | 11 | 38 |
| 11 | 56 | (Germany) Project 1 – AO | 12 | 6 | WD | 7 | 8 | 5 | 10 | 36 |
| 12 | 777 | (Japan) D'station Racing | 10 | NC | 10 | Ret | Ret | 10 | 2 | 31 |
| 13 | 60 | (Italy) Iron Lynx | 6 | 12 | 11 | Ret | 2 | 11 | Ret | 30 |
| 14 | 88 | (Germany) Proton Competition | WD | 9 | 4 | Ret | | | | 14 |
| Pos. | Car | Team | SEB (United States) | POR (Portugal) | SPA (Belgium) | LMS (France) | MNZ (Italy) | FUJ (Japan) | BHR (Bahrain) | Points |

== See also ==
- 2023 IMSA SportsCar Championship
