= 2023 1000 Miles of Sebring =

Endurance sportscar racing event

(United States) 2023 1000 Miles of Sebring
Event information
- Round 1 of 7 in the 2023 FIA World Endurance Championship
- Date: 17 March 2023
- Location: Sebring, Florida
- Venue: Sebring International Raceway
- Duration: 1000 miles or 8 hours

Results
- Laps completed: 239
- Distance (km): 1438.541
- Distance (miles): 894.099
- Hypercar

Pole position
- Time: 1:45.067
- Team: (Italy) Ferrari AF Corse

Winners
- Team: (Japan) Toyota Gazoo Racing
- Drivers: (United Kingdom) Mike Conway (Japan) Kamui Kobayashi (Argentina) José María López
- LMP2

Winners
- Team: (United Kingdom) Hertz Team Jota
- Drivers: (Germany) David Beckmann (United Kingdom) Will Stevens (China) Yifei Ye
- LMGTE Am

Winners
- Team: (United States) Corvette Racing
- Drivers: (Netherlands) Nicky Catsburg (United States) Ben Keating (Argentina) Nicolás Varrone

The 2023 1000 Miles of Sebring was an endurance sportscar racing event held at the Sebring International Raceway, Florida, United States on 17 March 2023, as the opening round of the 2023 FIA World Endurance Championship. It was the third running of the event. As of 2026, it is also the final running of the event.

== Background ==
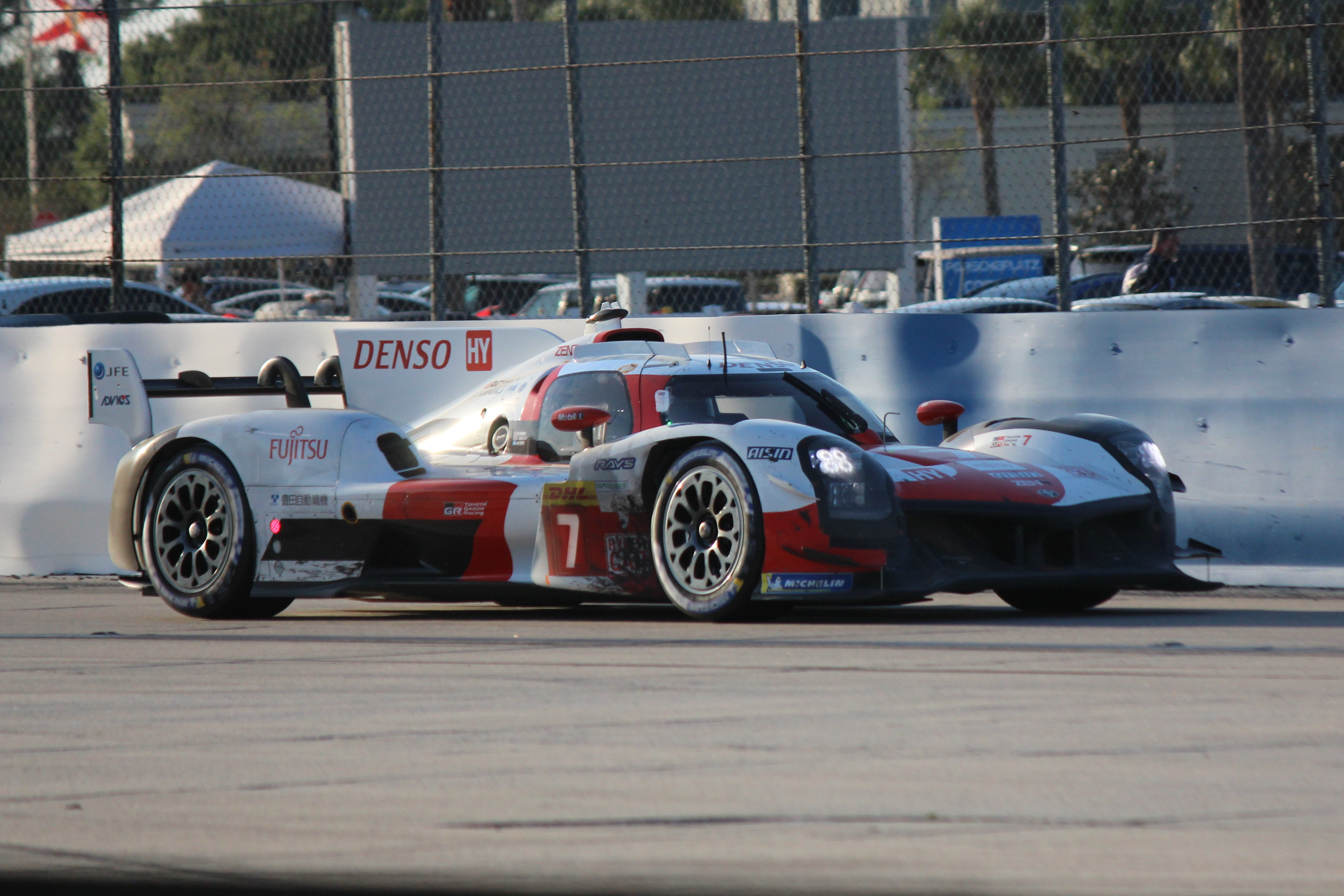
The #7 Toyota GR010 Hybrid on the front straight at sunset while leading the 1000 Miles of Sebring.

The 1000 Miles of Sebring was the first race for new and returning manufacturers to the top class of endurance racing: Porsche, Ferrari, Cadillac and Vanwall entered cars in the Hypercar category for the race. They joined returning manufacturers Toyota, Peugeot and Glickenhaus. Alpine was forced to leave the Hypercar class for a 1-year hiatus, with plans of returning for the 2024 season.

Customer teams also joined the Hypercar grid. Both Proton Competition and Jota Sport will receive a Porsche 963 later in the year. Unfortunately, these cars will not be delivered to the teams until at least mid-April, but in Proton's case probably until after Le Mans.

This is the first year of the World Endurance Championship without the LMGTE Pro category, after it got dropped in 2022 since manufacturers did not express enough interest in the class.

During the last 17 minutes of the race, on the official stream, the Falcon 9 carrying the SES-18 and SES-19 satellites was visible from the track.

== Entry list ==
The entry list was revealed on 1 March 2023. The list of entries for the event consisted of 37 cars across three classes. There were 11 entries in Hypercar, 12 entries in LMP2, and 14 entries in LMGTE Am. Porsche customer Hertz Team Jota entered the No. 48 car in the LMP2 class, due to the fact that the customer Porsche 963's were not yet ready to be delivered.

After an accident in FP2, Proton Competition withdrew their No. 88 Porsche 911 RSR-19 from the event after a collision with the No. 2 Cadillac V-Series.R. The car sustained extensive chassis damage that prevented it from taking part in the race. This withdrawal brought the amount of starting cars down to 36.

== Schedule ==
Date	Time (local: ET)	Event
Wednesday, 15 March	10:55	Free Practice 1
Wednesday, 15 March	16:35	Free Practice 2
Thursday, 16 March	11:55	Free Practice 3
Thursday, 16 March	18:30	Qualifying - LMGTE Am
Thursday, 16 March	18:55	Qualifying - LMP2
Thursday, 16 March	19:20	Qualifying - Hypercar
Friday, 17 March	12:00	Race

== Free practice ==
- Only the fastest car in each class is shown.

Free Practice 1	Class	No.	Entrant	Driver	Time
Free Practice 1	Hypercar	8	(Japan) Toyota Gazoo Racing	(Japan) Ryo Hirakawa	1:47.649
Free Practice 1	LMP2	63	(Italy) Prema Racing	(Italy) Mirko Bortolotti	1:50.074
Free Practice 1	LMGTE Am	85	(Italy) Iron Dames	(Denmark) Michelle Gatting	1:59.028
Free Practice 2	Class	No.	Entrant	Driver	Time
Free Practice 2	Hypercar	7	(Japan) Toyota Gazoo Racing	(Japan) Kamui Kobayashi	1:46.954
Free Practice 2	LMP2	28	(United Kingdom) Jota	(Brazil) Pietro Fittipaldi	1:50.326
Free Practice 2	LMGTE Am	57	(Switzerland) Kessel Racing	(Brazil) Daniel Serra	1:58.845
Free Practice 3	Class	No.	Entrant	Driver	Time
Free Practice 3	Hypercar	7	(Japan) Toyota Gazoo Racing	(Japan) Kamui Kobayashi	1:45.783
Free Practice 3	LMP2	28	(United Kingdom) Jota	(Brazil) Pietro Fittipaldi	1:50.128
Free Practice 3	LMGTE Am	98	(Canada) Northwest AMR	(Denmark) Nicki Thiim	1:59.030

== Qualifying ==
Pole position winners in each class are marked in bold.

Pos	Class	No.	Team	Time	Gap	Grid
1	**Hypercar**	**50**	**(Italy) Ferrari AF Corse**	**1:45.067**	-	**1**
2	Hypercar	8	(Japan) Toyota Gazoo Racing	1:45.281	+0.214	2
3	Hypercar	7	(Japan) Toyota Gazoo Racing	1:45.548	+0.481	3
4	Hypercar	51	(Italy) Ferrari AF Corse	1:45.874	+0.807	4
5	Hypercar	2	(United States) Cadillac Racing	1:46.082	+1.015	5
6	Hypercar	6	(Germany) Porsche Penske Motorsport	1:47.193	+2.126	6
7	Hypercar	5	(Germany) Porsche Penske Motorsport	1:47.210	+2.143	7
8	Hypercar	94	(France) Peugeot TotalEnergies	1:47.455	+2.388	8
9	Hypercar	93	(France) Peugeot TotalEnergies	1:48.205	+3.138	9
10	Hypercar	708	(United States) Glickenhaus Racing	1:49.164	+4.097	10
11	Hypercar	4	(Austria) Floyd Vanwall Racing Team	1:49.329	+4.262	11
12	**LMP2**	**23**	**(United Kingdom) United Autosports**	**1:49.974**	**+4.907**	**12**
13	LMP2	28	(United Kingdom) Jota	1:50.067	+5.000	13
14	LMP2	31	(Belgium) Team WRT	1:50.155	+5.088	14
15	LMP2	36	(France) Alpine Elf Team	1:50.174	+5.107	15
16	LMP2	48	(United Kingdom) Hertz Team Jota	1:50.218	+5.151	16
17	LMP2	41	(Belgium) Team WRT	1:50.291	+5.224	17
18	LMP2	22	(United Kingdom) United Autosports	1:50.408	+5.341	18
19	LMP2	9	(Italy) Prema Racing	1:50.417	+5.350	19
20	LMP2	10	(United Kingdom) Vector Sport	1:50.710	+5.643	20
21	LMP2	63	(Italy) Prema Racing	1:50.726	+5.659	21
22	LMP2	34	(Poland) Inter Europol Competition	1:50.889	+5.822	22
23	LMP2	35	(France) Alpine Elf Team	1:51.284	+6.217	23
24	**LMGTE Am**	**85**	**(Italy) Iron Dames**	**1:58.949**	**+13.882**	**24**
25	LMGTE Am	33	(United States) Corvette Racing	1:59.345	+14.278	25
26	LMGTE Am	25	(Oman) ORT by TF	1:59.657	+14.590	26
27	LMGTE Am	83	(Italy) Richard Mille AF Corse	1:59.733	+14.666	27
28	LMGTE Am	21	(Italy) AF Corse	1:59.992	+14.925	28
29	LMGTE Am	56	(Germany) Project 1 – AO	2:00.588	+15.521	29
30	LMGTE Am	57	(Switzerland) Kessel Racing	2:00.591	+15.524	30
31	LMGTE Am	98	(Canada) Northwest AMR	2:00.807	+15.740	31
32	LMGTE Am	777	(Japan) D'Station Racing	2:00.941	+15.874	32
33	LMGTE Am	54	(Italy) AF Corse	2:01.041	+15.974	33
34	LMGTE Am	77	(Germany) Dempsey-Proton Racing	2:01.054	+15.987	34
35	LMGTE Am	86	(United Kingdom) GR Racing	2:02.588	+17.521	35
36	LMGTE Am	60	(Italy) Iron Lynx	2:02.820	+17.753	36

== Race ==
=== Race result ===
The minimum number of laps for classification (70% of overall winning car's distance) was 136 laps. Class winners are in bold and ‡.

Final race classification
Pos	Class	No	Team	Drivers	Chassis	Tyre	Laps	Time/Retired
Pos	Class	No	Team	Drivers	Engine	Tyre	Laps	Time/Retired
1	**Hypercar**	**7**	**(Japan) Toyota Gazoo Racing**	**(United Kingdom) Mike Conway (Japan) Kamui Kobayashi (Argentina) José María López**	**Toyota GR010 Hybrid**	M	**239**	**8:00:19.877‡**
1	**Hypercar**	**7**	**(Japan) Toyota Gazoo Racing**	**(United Kingdom) Mike Conway (Japan) Kamui Kobayashi (Argentina) José María López**	**Toyota H8909 3.5 L Turbo V6**	M	**239**	**8:00:19.877‡**
2	Hypercar	8	(Japan) Toyota Gazoo Racing	(Switzerland) Sébastien Buemi (New Zealand) Brendon Hartley (Japan) Ryo Hirakawa	Toyota GR010 Hybrid	M	239	+2.168
2	Hypercar	8	(Japan) Toyota Gazoo Racing	(Switzerland) Sébastien Buemi (New Zealand) Brendon Hartley (Japan) Ryo Hirakawa	Toyota H8909 3.5 L Turbo V6	M	239	+2.168
3	Hypercar	50	(Italy) Ferrari AF Corse	(Italy) Antonio Fuoco (Spain) Miguel Molina (Denmark) Nicklas Nielsen	Ferrari 499P	M	237	+2 Laps
3	Hypercar	50	(Italy) Ferrari AF Corse	(Italy) Antonio Fuoco (Spain) Miguel Molina (Denmark) Nicklas Nielsen	Ferrari F163 3.0 L Turbo V6	M	237	+2 Laps
4	Hypercar	2	(United States) Cadillac Racing	(New Zealand) Earl Bamber (United Kingdom) Alex Lynn (United Kingdom) Richard Westbrook	Cadillac V-Series.R	M	237	+2 Laps
4	Hypercar	2	(United States) Cadillac Racing	(New Zealand) Earl Bamber (United Kingdom) Alex Lynn (United Kingdom) Richard Westbrook	Cadillac LMC55R 5.5 L V8	M	237	+2 Laps
5	Hypercar	5	(Germany) Porsche Penske Motorsport	(United States) Dane Cameron (Denmark) Michael Christensen (France) Frédéric Makowiecki	Porsche 963	M	235	+4 Laps
5	Hypercar	5	(Germany) Porsche Penske Motorsport	(United States) Dane Cameron (Denmark) Michael Christensen (France) Frédéric Makowiecki	Porsche 9RD 4.6 L Turbo V8	M	235	+4 Laps
6	Hypercar	6	(Germany) Porsche Penske Motorsport	(France) Kévin Estre (Germany) André Lotterer (Belgium) Laurens Vanthoor	Porsche 963	M	235	+4 Laps
6	Hypercar	6	(Germany) Porsche Penske Motorsport	(France) Kévin Estre (Germany) André Lotterer (Belgium) Laurens Vanthoor	Porsche 9RD 4.6 L Turbo V8	M	235	+4 Laps
7	**LMP2**	**48**	**(United Kingdom) Hertz Team Jota**	**(Germany) David Beckmann (United Kingdom) Will Stevens (China) Yifei Ye**	**Oreca 07**	G	**230**	**+9 Laps‡**
7	**LMP2**	**48**	**(United Kingdom) Hertz Team Jota**	**(Germany) David Beckmann (United Kingdom) Will Stevens (China) Yifei Ye**	**Gibson GK428 4.2 L V8**	G	**230**	**+9 Laps‡**
8	LMP2	22	(United Kingdom) United Autosports	(Portugal) Filipe Albuquerque (United Kingdom) Philip Hanson (United Kingdom) Frederick Lubin	Oreca 07	G	230	+9 Laps
8	LMP2	22	(United Kingdom) United Autosports	(Portugal) Filipe Albuquerque (United Kingdom) Philip Hanson (United Kingdom) Frederick Lubin	Gibson GK428 4.2 L V8	G	230	+9 Laps
9	LMP2	63	(Italy) Prema Racing	(Italy) Mirko Bortolotti; Daniil Kvyat (France) Doriane Pin	Oreca 07	G	230	+9 Laps
9	LMP2	63	(Italy) Prema Racing	(Italy) Mirko Bortolotti; Daniil Kvyat (France) Doriane Pin	Gibson GK428 4.2 L V8	G	230	+9 Laps
10	LMP2	34	(Poland) Inter Europol Competition	(Spain) Albert Costa (Switzerland) Fabio Scherer (Poland) Jakub Śmiechowski	Oreca 07	G	230	+9 Laps
10	LMP2	34	(Poland) Inter Europol Competition	(Spain) Albert Costa (Switzerland) Fabio Scherer (Poland) Jakub Śmiechowski	Gibson GK428 4.2 L V8	G	230	+9 Laps
11	LMP2	41	(Belgium) Team WRT	(Angola) Rui Andrade (Switzerland) Louis Delétraz (Poland) Robert Kubica	Oreca 07	G	230	+9 Laps
11	LMP2	41	(Belgium) Team WRT	(Angola) Rui Andrade (Switzerland) Louis Delétraz (Poland) Robert Kubica	Gibson GK428 4.2 L V8	G	230	+9 Laps
12	LMP2	28	(United Kingdom) Jota	(Brazil) Pietro Fittipaldi (Denmark) David Heinemeier Hansson (Denmark) Oliver Rasmussen	Oreca 07	G	230	+9 Laps
12	LMP2	28	(United Kingdom) Jota	(Brazil) Pietro Fittipaldi (Denmark) David Heinemeier Hansson (Denmark) Oliver Rasmussen	Gibson GK428 4.2 L V8	G	230	+9 Laps
13	LMP2	31	(Belgium) Team WRT	(Netherlands) Robin Frijns (Indonesia) Sean Gelael (Austria) Ferdinand Habsburg	Oreca 07	G	230	+9 Laps
13	LMP2	31	(Belgium) Team WRT	(Netherlands) Robin Frijns (Indonesia) Sean Gelael (Austria) Ferdinand Habsburg	Gibson GK428 4.2 L V8	G	230	+9 Laps
14	LMP2	9	(Italy) Prema Racing	(Italy) Andrea Caldarelli (Romania) Filip Ugran (Netherlands) Bent Viscaal	Oreca 07	G	229	+10 Laps
14	LMP2	9	(Italy) Prema Racing	(Italy) Andrea Caldarelli (Romania) Filip Ugran (Netherlands) Bent Viscaal	Gibson GK428 4.2 L V8	G	229	+10 Laps
15	Hypercar	51	(Italy) Ferrari AF Corse	(United Kingdom) James Calado (Italy) Antonio Giovinazzi (Italy) Alessandro Pier Guidi	Ferrari 499P	M	228	+11 Laps
15	Hypercar	51	(Italy) Ferrari AF Corse	(United Kingdom) James Calado (Italy) Antonio Giovinazzi (Italy) Alessandro Pier Guidi	Ferrari F163 3.0 L Turbo V6	M	228	+11 Laps
16	LMP2	36	(France) Alpine Elf Team	(France) Julien Canal (France) Charles Milesi (France) Matthieu Vaxivière	Oreca 07	G	228	+11 Laps
16	LMP2	36	(France) Alpine Elf Team	(France) Julien Canal (France) Charles Milesi (France) Matthieu Vaxivière	Gibson GK428 4.2 L V8	G	228	+11 Laps
17	**LMGTE Am**	**33**	**(United States) Corvette Racing**	**(Netherlands) Nicky Catsburg (United States) Ben Keating (Argentina) Nicolás Varrone**	**Chevrolet Corvette C8.R**	M	**221**	**+18 Laps‡**
17	**LMGTE Am**	**33**	**(United States) Corvette Racing**	**(Netherlands) Nicky Catsburg (United States) Ben Keating (Argentina) Nicolás Varrone**	**Chevrolet 5.5 L V8**	M	**221**	**+18 Laps‡**
18	LMGTE Am	77	(Germany) Dempsey-Proton Racing	(France) Julien Andlauer (Germany) Christian Ried (Denmark) Mikkel O. Pedersen	Porsche 911 RSR-19	M	219	+20 Laps
18	LMGTE Am	77	(Germany) Dempsey-Proton Racing	(France) Julien Andlauer (Germany) Christian Ried (Denmark) Mikkel O. Pedersen	Porsche 4.2 L Flat-6	M	219	+20 Laps
19	LMGTE Am	57	(Switzerland) Kessel Racing	(United States) Scott Huffaker (Japan) Takeshi Kimura (Brazil) Daniel Serra	Ferrari 488 GTE Evo	M	219	+20 Laps
19	LMGTE Am	57	(Switzerland) Kessel Racing	(United States) Scott Huffaker (Japan) Takeshi Kimura (Brazil) Daniel Serra	Ferrari F154CB 3.9 L Turbo V8	M	219	+20 Laps
20	LMGTE Am	21	(Italy) AF Corse	(Italy) Stefano Costantini (United States) Simon Mann (Belgium) Ulysse de Pauw	Ferrari 488 GTE Evo	M	219	+20 Laps
20	LMGTE Am	21	(Italy) AF Corse	(Italy) Stefano Costantini (United States) Simon Mann (Belgium) Ulysse de Pauw	Ferrari F154CB 3.9 L Turbo V8	M	219	+20 Laps
21	LMGTE Am	54	(Italy) AF Corse	(Italy) Francesco Castellacci (Switzerland) Thomas Flohr (Italy) Davide Rigon	Ferrari 488 GTE Evo	M	219	+20 Laps
21	LMGTE Am	54	(Italy) AF Corse	(Italy) Francesco Castellacci (Switzerland) Thomas Flohr (Italy) Davide Rigon	Ferrari F154CB 3.9 L Turbo V8	M	219	+20 Laps
22	LMGTE Am	60	(Italy) Iron Lynx	(Italy) Matteo Cressoni (Belgium) Alessio Picariello (Italy) Claudio Schiavoni	Porsche 911 RSR-19	M	219	+20 Laps
22	LMGTE Am	60	(Italy) Iron Lynx	(Italy) Matteo Cressoni (Belgium) Alessio Picariello (Italy) Claudio Schiavoni	Porsche 4.2 L Flat-6	M	219	+20 Laps
23	LMGTE Am	86	(United Kingdom) GR Racing	(United Kingdom) Ben Barker (Italy) Riccardo Pera (United Kingdom) Michael Wainwright	Porsche 911 RSR-19	M	218	+21 Laps
23	LMGTE Am	86	(United Kingdom) GR Racing	(United Kingdom) Ben Barker (Italy) Riccardo Pera (United Kingdom) Michael Wainwright	Porsche 4.2 L Flat-6	M	218	+21 Laps
24	LMGTE Am	85	(Italy) Iron Dames	(Belgium) Sarah Bovy (Switzerland) Rahel Frey (Denmark) Michelle Gatting	Porsche 911 RSR-19	M	218	+21 Laps
24	LMGTE Am	85	(Italy) Iron Dames	(Belgium) Sarah Bovy (Switzerland) Rahel Frey (Denmark) Michelle Gatting	Porsche 4.2 L Flat-6	M	218	+21 Laps
25	LMP2	10	(United Kingdom) Vector Sport	(France) Gabriel Aubry (Republic of Ireland) Ryan Cullen (Liechtenstein) Matthias Kaiser	Oreca 07	G	218	+21 Laps
25	LMP2	10	(United Kingdom) Vector Sport	(France) Gabriel Aubry (Republic of Ireland) Ryan Cullen (Liechtenstein) Matthias Kaiser	Gibson GK428 4.2 L V8	G	218	+21 Laps
26	LMGTE Am	25	(Oman) ORT by TF	(Oman) Ahmad Al Harthy (United States) Michael Dinan (Republic of Ireland) Charlie Eastwood	Aston Martin Vantage AMR	M	217	+22 Laps
26	LMGTE Am	25	(Oman) ORT by TF	(Oman) Ahmad Al Harthy (United States) Michael Dinan (Republic of Ireland) Charlie Eastwood	Aston Martin 4.0 L Turbo V8	M	217	+22 Laps
27	LMGTE Am	777	(Japan) D'Station Racing	(Japan) Tomonobu Fujii (Japan) Satoshi Hoshino (United Kingdom) Casper Stevenson	Aston Martin Vantage AMR	M	217	+22 Laps
27	LMGTE Am	777	(Japan) D'Station Racing	(Japan) Tomonobu Fujii (Japan) Satoshi Hoshino (United Kingdom) Casper Stevenson	Aston Martin 4.0 L Turbo V8	M	217	+22 Laps
28	LMGTE Am	98	(Canada) Northwest AMR	(Canada) Paul Dalla Lana (Zimbabwe) Axcil Jefferies (Denmark) Nicki Thiim	Aston Martin Vantage AMR	M	216	+23 Laps
28	LMGTE Am	98	(Canada) Northwest AMR	(Canada) Paul Dalla Lana (Zimbabwe) Axcil Jefferies (Denmark) Nicki Thiim	Aston Martin 4.0 L Turbo V8	M	216	+23 Laps
29	LMGTE Am	56	(Germany) Project 1 – AO	(Italy) Matteo Cairoli (United States) P.J. Hyett (United States) Gunnar Jeannette	Porsche 911 RSR-19	M	215	+24 Laps
29	LMGTE Am	56	(Germany) Project 1 – AO	(Italy) Matteo Cairoli (United States) P.J. Hyett (United States) Gunnar Jeannette	Porsche 4.2 L Flat-6	M	215	+24 Laps
30	Hypercar	4	(Austria) Floyd Vanwall Racing Team	(France) Tom Dillmann (Argentina) Esteban Guerrieri (Canada) Jacques Villeneuve	Vanwall Vandervell 680	M	215	+24 Laps
30	Hypercar	4	(Austria) Floyd Vanwall Racing Team	(France) Tom Dillmann (Argentina) Esteban Guerrieri (Canada) Jacques Villeneuve	Gibson GL458 4.5 L V8	M	215	+24 Laps
31	Hypercar	93	(France) Peugeot TotalEnergies	(Denmark) Mikkel Jensen (United Kingdom) Paul di Resta (France) Jean-Éric Vergne	Peugeot 9X8	M	213	+26 Laps
31	Hypercar	93	(France) Peugeot TotalEnergies	(Denmark) Mikkel Jensen (United Kingdom) Paul di Resta (France) Jean-Éric Vergne	Peugeot X6H 2.6 L Turbo V6	M	213	+26 Laps
NC	Hypercar	94	(France) Peugeot TotalEnergies	(France) Loïc Duval (United States) Gustavo Menezes (Switzerland) Nico Müller	Peugeot 9X8	M	141	Not Classified
NC	Hypercar	94	(France) Peugeot TotalEnergies	(France) Loïc Duval (United States) Gustavo Menezes (Switzerland) Nico Müller	Peugeot X6H 2.6 L Turbo V6	M	141	Not Classified
Ret	LMP2	35	(France) Alpine Elf Team	(United Kingdom) Olli Caldwell (Brazil) André Negrão (Mexico) Memo Rojas	Oreca 07	G	139	Retired
Ret	LMP2	35	(France) Alpine Elf Team	(United Kingdom) Olli Caldwell (Brazil) André Negrão (Mexico) Memo Rojas	Gibson GK428 4.2 L V8	G	139	Retired
Ret	LMP2	23	(United Kingdom) United Autosports	(United Kingdom) Tom Blomqvist (United Kingdom) Oliver Jarvis (United States) Josh Pierson	Oreca 07	G	91	Electrical
Ret	LMP2	23	(United Kingdom) United Autosports	(United Kingdom) Tom Blomqvist (United Kingdom) Oliver Jarvis (United States) Josh Pierson	Gibson GK428 4.2 L V8	G	91	Electrical
Ret	Hypercar	708	(United States) Glickenhaus Racing	(Australia) Ryan Briscoe (France) Romain Dumas (France) Olivier Pla	Glickenhaus SCG 007 LMH	M	62	Electrical
Ret	Hypercar	708	(United States) Glickenhaus Racing	(Australia) Ryan Briscoe (France) Romain Dumas (France) Olivier Pla	Glickenhaus P21 3.5 L Turbo V8	M	62	Electrical
Ret	LMGTE Am	83	(Italy) Richard Mille AF Corse	(Argentina) Luis Pérez Companc (Italy) Alessio Rovera (France) Lilou Wadoux	Ferrari 488 GTE Evo	M	4	Crash
Ret	LMGTE Am	83	(Italy) Richard Mille AF Corse	(Argentina) Luis Pérez Companc (Italy) Alessio Rovera (France) Lilou Wadoux	Ferrari F154CB 3.9 L Turbo V8	M	4	Crash

Tyre manufacturers
Key
Symbol	Tyre manufacturer
**G**	Goodyear
**M**	Michelin

== Standings after the race ==
2023 Hypercar World Endurance Drivers' Championship

Pos	Driver	Points
1	(United Kingdom) Mike Conway (Japan) Kamui Kobayashi (Argentina) José María López	38
2	(Switzerland) Sébastien Buemi (New Zealand) Brendon Hartley (Japan) Ryō Hirakawa	27
3	(Italy) Antonio Fuoco (Spain) Miguel Molina (Denmark) Nicklas Nielsen	24
4	(New Zealand) Earl Bamber (United Kingdom) Alex Lynn (United Kingdom) Richard Westbrook	18
5	(United States) Dane Cameron (Denmark) Michael Christensen (France) Frédéric Makowiecki	15

2023 Hypercar World Endurance Manufacturers' Championship

Pos	Manufacturer	Points
1	(Japan) Toyota	38
2	(Italy) Ferrari	24
3	(United States) Cadillac	18
4	(Germany) Porsche	10
5	(Austria) Vanwall	6

2023 FIA Endurance Trophy for LMP2 Drivers

Pos	Drivers	Points
1	(Portugal) Filipe Albuquerque (United Kingdom) Philip Hanson (United Kingdom) Frederick Lubin	38
2	(Italy) Mirko Bortolotti (Russia) Daniil Kvyat (France) Doriane Pin	27
3	(Spain) Albert Costa (Switzerland) Fabio Scherer (Poland) Jakub Śmiechowski	23
4	(Angola) Rui Andrade (Switzerland) Louis Delétraz (Poland) Robert Kubica	18
5	(Brazil) Pietro Fittipaldi (Denmark) David Heinemeier Hansson (Denmark) Oliver Rasmussen	15

2023 FIA Endurance Trophy for LMP2 Teams

Pos	No.	Team	Points
1	22	(United Kingdom) United Autosports	38
2	63	(Italy) Prema Racing	27
3	34	(Poland) Inter Europol Competition	23
4	41	(Belgium) Team WRT	18
5	28	(United Kingdom) Jota	15

2023 FIA Endurance Trophy for LMGTE Am Drivers

Pos	Drivers	Points
1	(Netherlands) Nicky Catsburg (United States) Ben Keating (Argentina) Nicolás Varrone	38
2	(France) Julien Andlauer (Germany) Christian Ried (Denmark) Mikkel O. Pedersen	27
3	(United States) Scott Huffaker (Japan) Takeshi Kimura (Brazil) Daniel Serra	23
4	(Italy) Stefano Costantini (United States) Simon Mann (Belgium) Ulysse de Pauw	18
5	(Italy) Francesco Castellacci (Switzerland) Thomas Flohr (Italy) Davide Rigon	15

2023 FIA Endurance Trophy for LMGTE Am Teams

Pos	No.	Team	Points
1	33	(United States) Corvette Racing	38
2	77	(Germany) Dempsey-Proton Racing	27
3	57	(Switzerland) Kessel Racing	23
4	21	(Italy) AF Corse	18
5	54	(Italy) AF Corse	15

- Note: Only the top five positions are included for all championship standings.

FIA World Endurance Championship
Previous race: None	2023 season	Next race: 6 Hours of Portimão
