= 2019 8 Hours of Bahrain =

Sportscar racing event

Coordinates: 26°1′57″N 50°30′38″E

2019 BAPCO 8 Hours of Bahrain
Event information
- Round 4 of 8 in the 2019-20 FIA World Endurance Championship
- Date: 14 December 2019-20
- Location: Sakhir
- Venue: Bahrain International Circuit
- Duration: 8 Hours

Results
- Laps completed: 257
- Distance (km): 1390.884
- Distance (miles): 864.291
- LMP1

Pole position
- Time: 1:42.979
- Team: (Switzerland) Rebellion Racing
- Drivers: (Brazil) Bruno Senna (France) Norman Nato

Winners
- Team: (Japan) Toyota Gazoo Racing
- Drivers: (United Kingdom) Mike Conway (Japan) Kamui Kobayashi (Argentina) José María López
- LMP2

Winners
- Team: (United Kingdom) United Autosports
- Drivers: (Portugal) Filipe Albuquerque (United Kingdom) Philip Hanson (United Kingdom) Paul di Resta
- LMGTE Pro

Winners
- Team: (United Kingdom) Aston Martin Racing
- Drivers: (Denmark) Marco Sørensen (Denmark) Nicki Thiim
- LMGTE Am

Winners
- Team: (Germany) Team Project 1
- Drivers: (Netherlands) Jeroen Bleekemolen (Netherlands) Larry ten Voorde (United States) Ben Keating

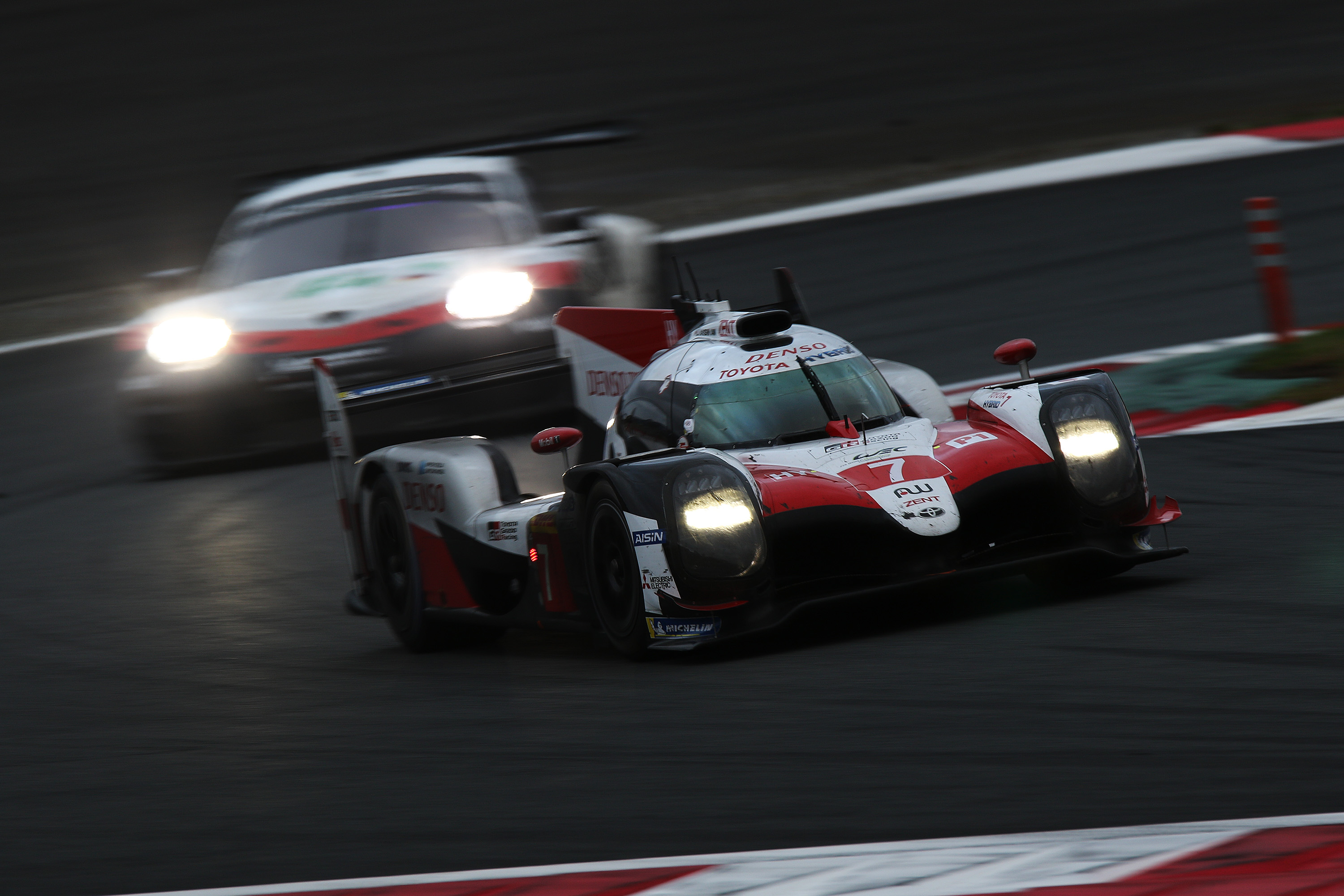
The race winning #7 Toyota TS050 Hybrid seen at the 2018 6 Hours of Fuji

The 2019 8 Hours of Bahrain, formally known as the 2019 BAPCO 8 Hours of Bahrain, for sponsorship reasons, was an endurance sportscar racing event held on 14 December 2019, as the fourth round of the 2019–20 FIA World Endurance Championship. This would mark the return of the FIA WEC to the Bahrain International Circuit for the first time since 2017, and would also be the inaugural running of the race, in an extended 8 hours format, having previously been run as the 6 Hours of Bahrain.

The race was won overall by the #7 Toyota TS050 Hybrid run by Toyota Gazoo Racing, and driven by Kamui Kobayashi, Mike Conway and José María López. The trio had benefited from the opening lap collision at Turn 2, between the front row starters, the #1 Rebellion R13 run by Rebellion Racing, and the #5 Ginetta G60-LT-P1 run by Team LNT, to take the lead from the first lap of the race, from fourth on the grid.

The Le Mans Prototype LMP2 class was won by the #22 Oreca 07 run by United Autosports, and driven by Paul di Resta, Philip Hanson, Filipe Albuquerque. The trio had also benefited from the opening lap chaos, with the car holding the class lead on lap one, and even running second overall at one point, but later falling down the overall order, as the LMP1s climbed their way back up above the secondary class runners during the race.

== Background ==
The provisional calendar for the 2019–20 FIA World Endurance Championship was unveiled at the 2018 6 Hours of Silverstone, featuring eight races, on five continents, starting at Silverstone in September 2019 with a four-hour race, and ending with the Le Mans 24 Hours in June 2020. It was noted that for first time in the FIA World Endurance Championship, 4 and 8 hour races would be introduced, at the Silverstone Circuit, Shanghai International Circuit, and the Bahrain International Circuit, following a fan survey which was conducted by the championship despite there being an overwhelming preference being shown for races with durations of 6, 12 and 24 hours.

== Entry list ==
A provisional entry list was issued on the 12th of November 2019, with 31 cars split across 4 classes, with all 4 full season LMP1 entrants listed, alongside 9 LMP2 cars, up from the 8 full season cars due to the addition of the #26 G-Drive Racing Aurus 01, with a driver lineup for Jean-Éric Vergne, Roman Rusinov and Job van Uitert. The GTE Classes saw no additional cars entered, with all 6 full season GTE-Pro cars, and 11 GTE-Am cars being listed. Majority of the race seats were indicated to have been filled, with the exception of the 2 Team LNT Ginetta G60-LT-P1s, and the #88 Dempsey-Proton Racing Porsche 911 RSR. The list also saw changes to the driver lineup for the #57 Team Project 1 Porsche 911 RSR, with Larry ten Voorde returning for a second race, alongside Ben Keating and Jeroen Bleekemolen replacing Felipe Fraga, who would be competing in the Stock Car Brasil season finale, which clashed with the 8 Hours of Bahrain. On 26 November, Team LNT announced its driver lineup for the race, with the majority of its drivers continuing with the team, with the exception of Egor Orudzhev, who would make way for Chris Dyson, alongside a minor shakeup in the driver lineups for each car. On 10 December 2019, it was announced that Khaled Al Qubaisi and Adrien De Leeneer would complete the lineup for the #88 Dempsey-Proton Racing Porsche, replacing Angelo Negao and Will Bamber.

== Qualifying ==
=== Qualifying Report ===
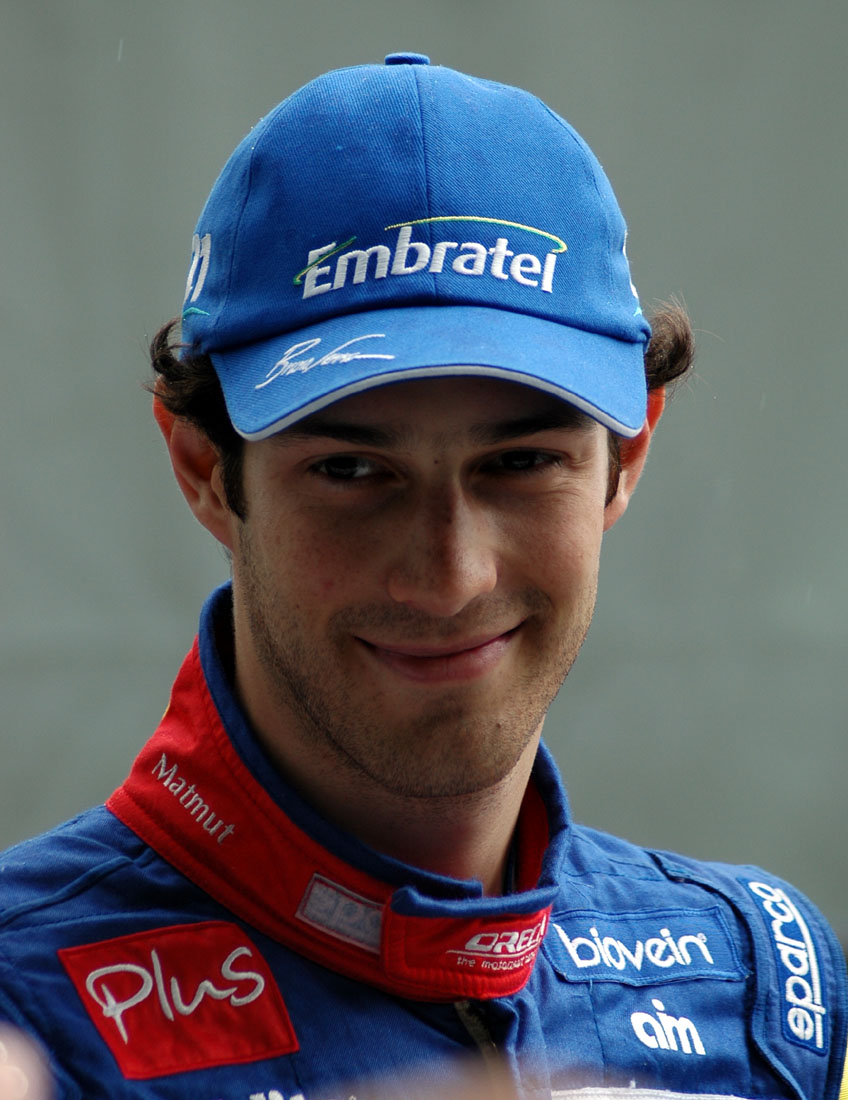
Bruno Senna (pictured here in 2009) scored pole position with teammate Norman Nato

In LMP1, the #1 Rebellion Racing Rebellion R13 would score a 2nd consecutive Pole Position, once more piping another Team LNT Ginetta to pole position. Norman Nato and Bruno Senna set an average time of 1:42.979 that put the #1 Rebellion R13 0.144 seconds clear of the #5 Ginetta G60-LT-P1 of Charlie Robertson and Ben Hanley. Toyota Gazoo Racing's Toyota TS050 Hybrids occupied the second row of the grid with Brendon Hartley and Kazuki Nakajima out-qualifying their teammates from the #7 car, Mike Conway and José María López by less than a tenth of a second, with the average time achieved by Hartley and Nakajima in the #8 Toyota, being 0.863 seconds off the pole-sitting Rebellion. The #8 had also out-qualified the #7 in spite of the fact that it was running with a slightly larger success penalty than its sister car for the weekend. The #6 Team LNT finished 5th in the session, rounding out the LMP1 field.

In LMP2, Paul di Resta and Philip Hanson handed United Autosports its maiden WEC pole, after setting an average lap time of 1:45.357 in the team's #22 Oreca 07. Di Resta had been the only driver to set a sub-1:45 lap time among the first set of drivers, while the silver-rated Hanson consolidated his co-driver's work, scoring the second-quickest time in the second set of drivers, resulting in the #22 United Autosports team pipping the second-placed #37 Jackie Chan DC Racing Oreca of Will Stevens and Gabriel Aubry to pole, by 0.292 seconds. Guest entry, G-Drive Racing finished 3rd in the session, with Jean-Eric Vergne and Job van Uitert qualifying the car, with the TDS-operated car starting alongside the Shanghai winning Jota Sport Oreca on the second row, whilst Cool Racing and High Class Racing would line up in fifth and sixth. The #35 Signatech Alpine would lineup on the fourth row, next to the #29 Racing Team Nederland Oreca. The sole non-Oreca in the LMP2 field, the #47 Cetilar Racing Dallara P217, run by AF Corse rounded out the LMP2 pack, with the car finishing nearly half a second behind the #29.

In GTE-Pro, Richard Lietz and Gianmaria Bruni finished the session on class pole, claiming Porsche's third consecutive GTE-Pro pole in 2019-20 FIA World Endurance Championship. This was also the 2nd pole of the season scored by the pair, who had also sat on pole for the 6 Hours of Fuji. The pair in the #91 Porsche 911 RSR combined for an average time of 1:56.485, narrowly outpacing their class championship-leading teammates in the #92, Kévin Estre and Michael Christensen by 0.060 seconds. The pair of AF Corse Ferrari 488 GTE Evos qualified third and fourth, with the #51 entry of James Calado and Alessandro Pier Guidi leading the pair of Ferraris, the #51 pair still looking to bounce back following their exclusion from the 4 Hours of Shanghai. Aston Martin Racing struggled in the session, with the #95 entry of Marco Sørensen and Nicki Thiim qualifying fifth, nearly a second adrift of the pole-sitting Porsche, in what usually was a tightly spaced class, after struggling due a flat-spotted tire. The sister #97 car, would instead start last, after Maxime Martin's time was deleted due to him exceeding track limits.

In GTE-Am, Ben Keating claimed his first WEC class pole, teaming with Larry ten Voorde to bring the #57 Team Project 1 Porsche 911 RSR to the class pole. The #54 AF Corse Ferrari qualified second, followed by the #88 Dempsey-Proton Racing Porsche 911 RSR in third, the #54 preventing a Porsche front row in the Pro-Am class. The #83 AF Corse Ferrari, which is in the title battle with the #90 TF Sport, would start from fourth, after Francois Perrodo was unable to replicate the performance of his teammate Nicklas Nielsen, the Dane having put the #83 atop the running order for the class before the driver swaps.

=== Qualifying Results ===
Pole Position winners in each class are in bold

Pos	Class	Team	Average Time	Gap	Grid
1	**LMP1**	**No. 1 Rebellion Racing**	**1:42.979**	-	**1**
2	LMP1	No. 5 Team LNT	1:43.123	+0.144	2
3	LMP1	No. 8 Toyota Gazoo Racing	1:43.497	+0.518	3
4	LMP1	No. 7 Toyota Gazoo Racing	1:43.842	+0.863	4
5	LMP1	No. 6 Team LNT	1:43.887	+0.908	5
6	**LMP2**	**No. 22 United Autosports**	**1:45.357**	**+2.378**	**6**
7	LMP2	No. 37 Jackie Chan DC Racing	1:45.649	+2.670	7
8	LMP2	No. 26 G-Drive Racing	1:45.953	+2.974	8
9	LMP2	No. 38 Jota Sport	1:46.415	+3.436	9
10	LMP2	No. 42 Cool Racing	1:47.265	+4.286	10
11	LMP2	No. 33 High Class Racing	1:47.323	+4.344	11
12	LMP2	No. 36 Signatech Alpine Elf	1:47.725	+4.746	12
13	LMP2	No. 29 Racing Team Nederland	1:48.899	+5.920	13
14	LMP2	No. 47 Cetilar Racing	1:49.474	+6.495	14
**15**	**LMGTE-Pro**	**No. 91 Porsche GT Team**	**1:55.485**	**+12.506**	**15**
16	LMGTE-Pro	No. 92 Porsche GT Team	1:55.545	+12.566	16
17	LMGTE-Pro	No. 51 AF Corse	1:56.087	+13.108	17
18	LMGTE-Pro	No. 71 AF Corse	1:56.318	+13.339	18
19	LMGTE-Pro	No. 95 Aston Martin Racing	1:56.389	+13.410	19
**20**	**LMGTE-Am**	**No. 57 Team Project 1**	**1:57.602**	**+14.623**	**20**
21	LMGTE-Am	No. 88 Dempsey-Proton Racing	1:57.661	+14.682	21
22	LMGTE-Am	No. 83 AF Corse	1:57.690	+14.711	22
23	LMGTE-Am	No. 56 Team Project 1	1:57.863	+14.884	23
24	LMGTE-Am	No. 86 Gulf Racing	1:57.977	+14.998	24
25	LMGTE-Am	No. 98 Aston Martin Racing	1:58.002	+15.023	25
26	LMGTE-Am	No. 90 TF Sport	1:58.047	+15.068	26
27	LMGTE-Am	No. 62 Red River Sport	1:58.217	+15.238	27
28	LMGTE-Am	No. 70 MR Racing	1:58.635	+15.656	28
29	LMGTE-Am	No. 77 Dempsey-Proton Racing	1:59.959	+16.980	29
30	LMGTE-Pro	No. 97 Aston Martin Racing	1:56.253	+13.274	30
31	LMGTE-Am	No. 54 AF Corse	1:56.903	+13.924	31

== Race ==
=== Race Report ===
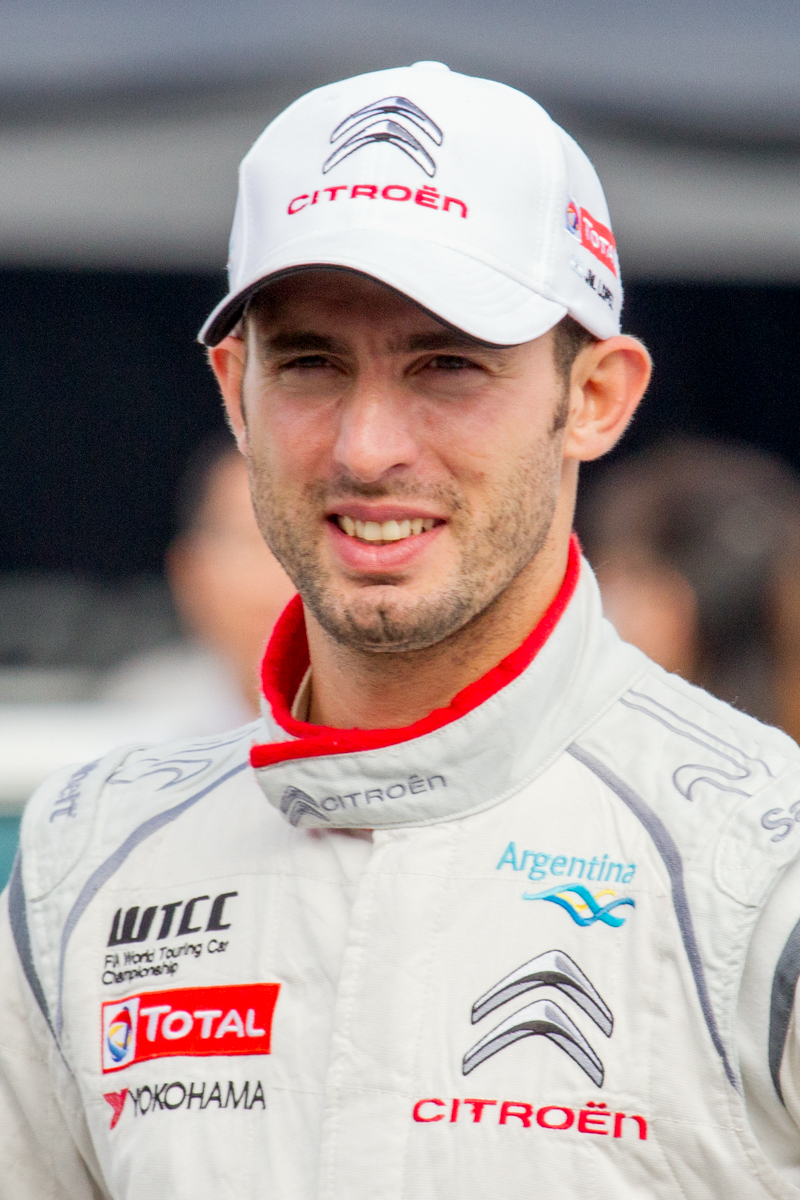
José María López (pictured here in 2014) brought the #7 Toyota TS050 Hybrid across the line to lead home a 1-2 finish for Toyota Gazoo Racing

The #7 Toyota Gazoo Racing Toyota TS050 Mike Conway led the opening hour of the 8 Hours of Bahrain, benefiting from an incident between the two front-row cars of Bruno Senna and Charlie Robertson. Senna in the pole-sitting #1 Rebellion Racing R13 and Robertson in the 2nd placed #5 Ginetta G60-LT-P1 were spun around following contact between the pair, which allowed Conway to easily slip through the chaos, and swiftly take the lead of the race. During the incident, Robertson appeared to lose the rear of the #5 Team LNT Ginetta as the pack came into the Turn 2 left-hand kink, running into Senna. As both cars collided, the #5 bore most of the brunt of the impact, while Sebastien Buemi in the #8 Toyota was also caught up in the chaos, losing lost seven positions in the #8 Toyota TS050 Hybrid. The incident scattered the LMP1 field, and shuffled the order of the race, with the LMP2 class leader, the #22 United Autosports Oreca 07, with Paul di Resta in second overall, as Conway sped away in the lead of the race. Second in the LMP1 class was Mike Simpson in the #6 Ginetta, who was fifth overall, while Buemi and Senna were left further behind, with Robertson losing 2 laps owing to repairs to the Ginetta. The result of the carnage at Turn 1 meant that for the first half hour of the race, the LMP2 cars ran ahead of all P1s, bar the lead Toyota. In LMP2, di Resta made the best of his pole position, leading through the opening round of pit stops from Job van Uitert in G-Drive Racing's Aurus 01. Nicolas Lapierre was third for a while for Cool Racing, but the eventually fell back during towards the end of the opening stint as Andre Negrao, Kenta Yamashita and Anthony Davidson surged past in the #35, #33, and #37 Orecas.

In GTE Pro, Alessandro Pier Guidi led the first stint in GTE-Pro after a first-corner shuffle led to pole man Gianmaria Bruni dropping four positions in his #91 Porsche 911 RSR-19. Bruni was knocked out wide when Pier Guidi locked up slightly into Turn 1 and dropped down the order, as Kevin Estre, Marco Sørensen, and Miguel Molina overtook him. By the end of hour one, Pier Guidi had built up a three-second gap to Estre while Bruni had charged back up to third, having overtaken Molina, before later gaining an additional place, when Sørensen brought the No. 95 Aston Martin Vantage GTE in for an early regular pit stop. Team Project 1 controlled the opening hour of the race in GTE-Am, with a 1–2, as Ben Keating in the #57 converted his pole position into a massive 15-second lead ahead of Egidio Perfetti in the #56. Third in class behind the two Porsches was the #98 Aston Martin of Paul Dalla Lana.

In the third hour of the race, Rebellion Racing lost its second place in the third hour, following a suspected driveline problem, which promoted Toyota into a commanding one-two position, which they would hold for the remainder for the race. At the time when the #1 was forced to pit, the driver at the time, Gustavo Menezes had held a 50-second gap over Brendon Hartley in the #8. While Hartley ascended into 2nd place, the Rebellion lost 3 laps, falling outside the top 10 in the process. The #6 Ginetta also benefited from the suspected issue for the Rebellion, jumping into 3rd place, albeit being 1 lap down on the leading #7 Toyota, with Chris Dyson having spun early on during his first stint in the car. The sister #5 Team LNT car, which had been involved in a collision earlier with the #1 Rebellion had recovered, being ahead of all of the LMP2 cars, save for the leading car in the secondary prototype class, the #22 United Autosports.

In the GTE-Pro category, AF Corse's Alessandro Pier Guidi, in the #51 Ferrari 488 GTE Evo, overtook the #92 Porsche 911 RSR of Michael Christensen and the Aston Martin Vantage GTE of Nicki Thiim in the space of two laps, momentarily after the Rebellion incident. The #95 Aston Martin of Thiim and Sørensen had been the leader for much of the race, after an early first stop which had elevated it ahead of the rest of the field, but Thiim dropped to third in the second half of the third hour, when Christensen managed to overtake him. In GTE-Am, Gulf Racing took the lead after Andrew Watson overtook Paul Dalla Lana in the factory GTE-Am Aston Martin Vantage AMR GTE.

At the end of the 4th hour, the #7 Toyota of José María López, who had taken over from Kamui Kobayashi, held an enormous gap over of over 1 minute against the second-placed sister #8 Toyota of Kazuki Nakajima, while Team LNT sat third with the #5 Ginetta G60-LT-P1 AER of Ben Hanley, while Gustavo Menezes had brought the #1 Rebellion R13 back to overall, having lost three laps earlier, with a suspected driveline problem. In LMP2, the #22 United Autosports built up a one-minute lead in LMP2, in the hands of Felipe Albuquerque ahead of the guest G-Drive Racing entry.

In GTE-Pro, Aston Martin Racing found itself at the head of the class, when the team elected not to stop the #97 Vantage GTE during a fourth-hour Full Course Yellow. The #92 Porsche 911 RSR of Kevin Estre, which had been second to the #51 Ferrari 488 GTE Evo prior to the FCY, suffered a setback when it suffered a damper failure, and had to be pushed into the garage, losing a handful of laps, and rejoining 27th outright. The sister car of the #92 also saw itself struck with trouble, as the #91 Porsche, then piloted by Gianmaria Bruni limped to the pits with a right-front problem and also rapidly slid down the order. This gifted Alessandro Pier Guidi the GTE-Pro lead in the #51 AF Corse Ferrari 488 GTE Evo; however, he made a stop at the end of hour four, giving AMR a 1–2, with #97 ahead of the #95. In GTE-Am, Team Project 1's #57 Porsche 911 RSR led, following Larry ten Voorde's pass on the #86 Gulf Racing Porsche of Michael Wainwright.

Following the end of the fifth hour, the LMP1 class suffered its first casualty, with the #5 Ginetta being struck down due to a mechanical issue, grinding to a halt on the track. Its sister car, the #6 would pull into the garage at the penultimate hour, resulting in neither Ginetta making it to the end of the race.

By the end of the race, following the end of the 8th Hour, the #7 Toyota Gazoo Racing TS050 Hybrid, driven across the line by José María López, beat the sister #8 car to the finish by one lap, leading a 1–2 finish for the Japanese manufacturer. At the finish, the race leader was 3 laps ahead of the remaining privateer, the #1 Rebellion Racing Rebellion R13, which had enjoyed a largely trouble-free second half of the race, after a drama-filled first half, which had first seen it punted at turn 2, and a later gearbox issue which saw it make a trip to the garage. In LMP2, the #22 United Autosports Oreca scored its first WEC class victory with a dominant performance from the trio of Paul di Resta, Philip Hanson and Filipe Albuquerque. The Anglo-American team's Oreca had led for the majority of the race and reached the chequered flag 21 seconds ahead of the second-placed Jota Sport car of António Félix da Costa, Roberto Gonzalez and Anthony Davidson at the finish. A Full Course Yellow with 40 minutes remaining in the race helped a number of the leading cars in the class to reach the end without needing to stop for an extra splash of fuel, with a key beneficiary being the guest #26 G-Drive Racing Aurus 01, which held onto its fourth place behind the Jackie Chan DC Racing Oreca 07, driven by Ho-Pin Tung, Will Stevens and Gabriel Aubry. The #36 Signatech Alpine A470 of Andre Negrao, Pierre Ragues and Thomas Laurent rounded the top 5 in the LMP2 class.

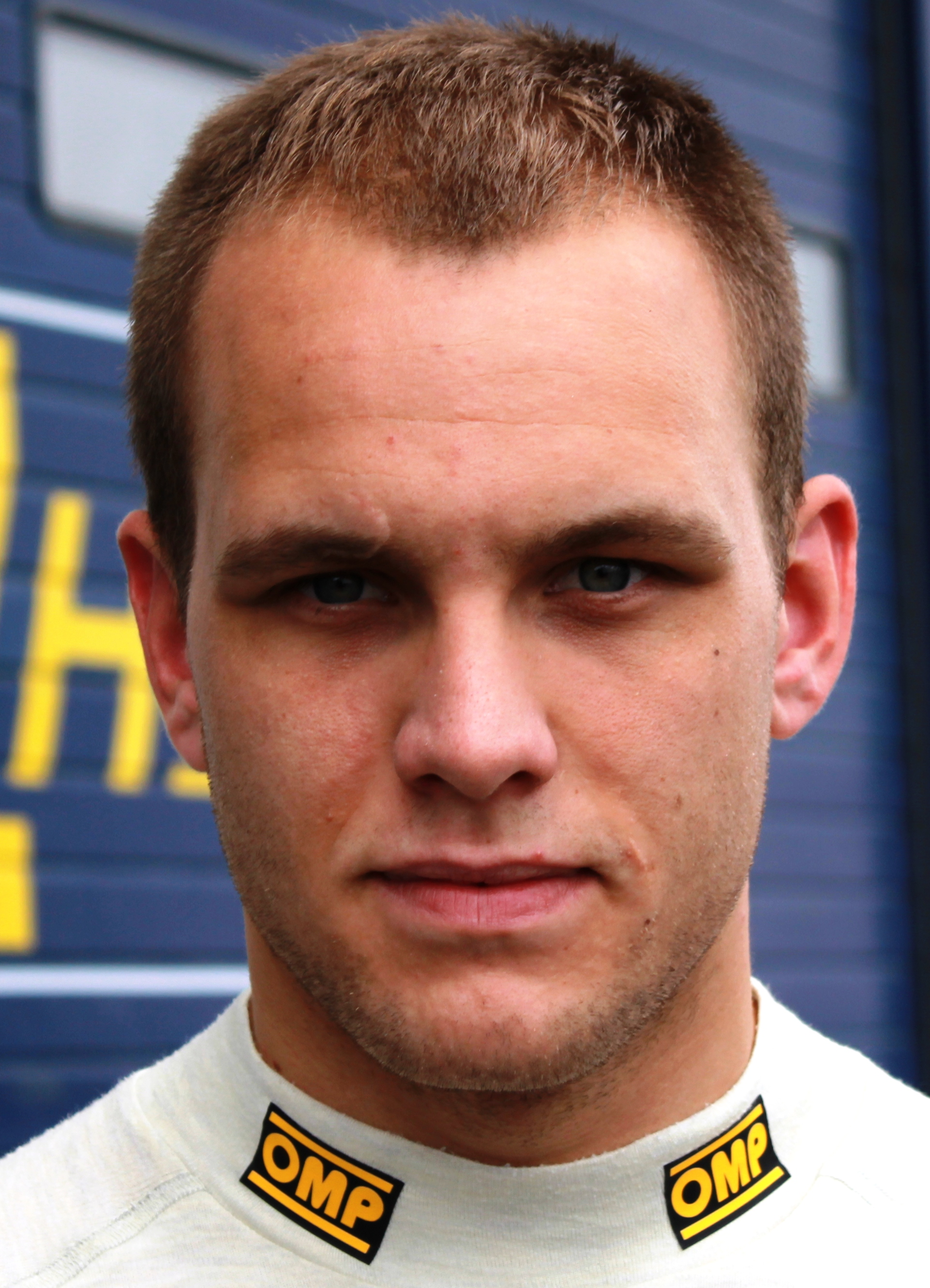
Marco Sørensen (pictured here in 2012) brought the #95 Aston Martin Vantage GTE to the chequered flag, claiming the lead in the GTE World Drivers' Championship

In GTE-Pro, Aston Martin Racing claimed its second GTE-Pro win of the season, in what proved to be a hard-fought race in the desert. Marco Sørensen took the #95 Aston Martin Vantage GTE across the line, holding a 13.798s lead over the #71 AF Corse Ferrari 488 GTE Evo of Miguel Molina, with Molina being slapped with a late-race penalty, that severely impacted the #71's chances at victory. Initially, a quicker final stop for the Prodrive-run AMR team had put Sørensen out front of Molina in the final hour, following what had been a race-long duel in the desert, between the two manufacturers that went down to the wire, until the final hour. It was at the final hour, where AF Corse's and Molina's victory bid fell apart, when the Spaniard was served a drive-through penalty with just over 30 minutes left on the timer, for a spinning his wheels during his final scheduled stop, effectively handing over the win to Sorensen and his co-driver Nicki Thiim. However, the #71 AF Corse Ferrari of Molina and Davide Rigon was still able deny Aston Martin Racing a 1–2 finish, with Maxime Martin rounding out the class podium in 3rd, in the #97 entry alongside co-driver Alex Lynn. Initially, it was thought that the #97 would be denied third, after Calado in the #51 Ferrari had done an overtake from the outside of Martin, after the restart following the race's second Full Course Yellow, which occurred during the final hour. However, Calado's overtake was later reviewed by race officials, and as the overtake was deemed to have been made beyond track limits, the AF Corse driver was ordered to return the position with 20 minutes remaining on the timer. As a result, Calado and co-driver Alessandro Pier Guidi, were relegated to finishing fourth in class. The duo finished ahead of both Porsches, with the #91 Porsche 911 RSR of Gianmaria Bruni and Richard Lietz coming in fifth, falling behind the class pack in the fourth hour with a right-rear puncture, resulting in an unscheduled pit stop. The #92 Porsche, which had entered the weekend as GTE championship leaders, fell out of contention for the race win, with a left-rear damper failure just minutes before the issue on the sister car occurred. The #92 crew of Kevin Estre and Michael Christensen eventually finished sixth, and at the tail end of the Pro class, but seventh in the overall GTE classification in the race, behind the Am class #57 Team Project 1 Porsche.

In GTE-Am, Team Project 1 claimed a dominant class victory, with Ben Keating scoring his first career WEC win in the #57, sharing top honors with his longtime co-driver Jeroen Bleekemolen and Dutchman Larry ten Voorde. The Dutchman finished more than 30s ahead of the factory team run #98 Aston Martin Vantage GTE of Ross Gunn, Paul Dalla Lana and Darren Turner in second. The #86 Gulf Racing Porsche, meanwhile, scored its first class podium of the 2019–20 season, after a relatively consistent run to third. Initially, Keating and teammate Egidio Perfetti, from the sister #56 car had run a 1–2 formation early, until exhaust issues struck the #56 in the second hour of the race, sending it to the garage, and later tumbling down the order.

GTE-Am championship leaders TF Sport, who had been seeking a hat trick of consecutive class wins, to further build up their lead in the standings, was one of just two retirements in the Pro-Am class, with the #90 Aston Martin dropping out of the race, having suffered from a fuel starvation issue with two hours to go to the end.

=== Post-Race ===
Following the race, 2 time FIA World Endurance Champion Sébastien Buemi said that the #8 crew were driving the car in a "survival mode", due to damage arising from various incidents during the race, including that from the opening-lap incident, where Buemi went off-course to avoid Bruno Senna's Rebellion R13, which initially resulted in a nose change in the first pit stop. This earlier setback was compounded later in the race, when Nakajima made contact while attempting to lap a Ferrari 488 GTE car, damaging the Toyota's floor and rear deck, costing the car downforce. Toyota GAZOO Racing technical director Pascal Vasselon also admitted that a 1-2 finish had been unlikely to occur initially, due to the success ballast, and that they had benefited from the LMP1 privateer misfortunes, for the result to be achieved. He also added that the reason the team opted against changing the floor of the car was due to the length of time required to replace it, which could have potentially cost the car its 2nd-placed finish.

Also in the LMP1 class, third-place finisher Bruno Senna expressed his regret at giving Charlie Robertson in the #5 Ginetta any space while the duo were at turn 2, and felt that he should have had forced Robertson off-track, which would have prevented the 2 from colliding, believing that the collision had destabilized the internal system of the cars, leading to the issue with the car's electronic shifting system, that had ultimately forced it to pit for a lengthy repair during Hour 3. Rebellion Racing team manager Bart Hayden however, appeared to disagree with his driver's opinion, stating that it was a very remote possibility, as the Electronic Shifting Motor had been on the side of the car, away from the Ginetta G60-LT-P1 of Robertson. Senna's co-driver, Gustavo Menezes did not comment on the possibility of the Electronic Shifting Motor failure and the turn 2 incident being linked, although he did agree that the Electronic Shifting Motor failure had cost the team the chance of winning the race, and that without the issue, the team could have caught up on the lost time from the collision.

Meanwhile, in LMP2, High Class Racing would drop Goodyear as its tyre supplier, with Michelin to supply the team from Lone Star Le Mans onwards. The Danish team would get its first running on Michelin tyres during the post-race test.

=== Race Result ===
The minimum number of laps for classification (70% of the overall winning car's race distance) was 180 laps. Class winners in bold.

Pos	Class	No	Team	Drivers	Chassis	Tyre	Laps	Time/Retired
Pos	Class	No	Team	Drivers	Engine	Tyre	Laps	Time/Retired
1	**LMP1**	**7**	**(Japan) Toyota Gazoo Racing**	**(United Kingdom) Mike Conway (Japan) Kamui Kobayashi (Argentina) José María López**	**Toyota TS050 Hybrid**	M	**257**	**8:01:23.599**
1	**LMP1**	**7**	**(Japan) Toyota Gazoo Racing**	**(United Kingdom) Mike Conway (Japan) Kamui Kobayashi (Argentina) José María López**	**Toyota 2.4L Turbo V6**	M	**257**	**8:01:23.599**
2	LMP1	8	(Japan) Toyota Gazoo Racing	(Switzerland) Sébastien Buemi (Japan) Kazuki Nakajima (New Zealand) Brendon Hartley	Toyota TS050 Hybrid	M	256	+1 Lap
2	LMP1	8	(Japan) Toyota Gazoo Racing	(Switzerland) Sébastien Buemi (Japan) Kazuki Nakajima (New Zealand) Brendon Hartley	Toyota 2.4L Turbo V6	M	256	+1 Lap
3	LMP1	1	(Switzerland) Rebellion Racing	(Brazil) Bruno Senna (United States) Gustavo Menezes (France) Norman Nato	Rebellion R13	M	254	+3 Laps
3	LMP1	1	(Switzerland) Rebellion Racing	(Brazil) Bruno Senna (United States) Gustavo Menezes (France) Norman Nato	Gibson GL458 4.5 L V8	M	254	+3 Laps
4	**LMP2**	**22**	**(United Kingdom) United Autosports**	**(Portugal) Filipe Albuquerque** **(United Kingdom) Philip Hanson** **(United Kingdom) Paul di Resta**	**Oreca 07**	M	**249**	**+9 Laps**
4	**LMP2**	**22**	**(United Kingdom) United Autosports**	**(Portugal) Filipe Albuquerque** **(United Kingdom) Philip Hanson** **(United Kingdom) Paul di Resta**	**Gibson GK428 4.2 L V8**	M	**249**	**+9 Laps**
5	LMP2	38	(United Kingdom) Jota Sport	(Portugal) António Félix da Costa **(United Kingdom)** Anthony Davidson (Mexico) Roberto González	Oreca 07	G	249	+9 Laps
5	LMP2	38	(United Kingdom) Jota Sport	(Portugal) António Félix da Costa **(United Kingdom)** Anthony Davidson (Mexico) Roberto González	Gibson GK428 4.2 L V8	G	249	+9 Laps
6	LMP2	37	(China) Jackie Chan DC Racing	(China) Ho-Pin Tung (France) Gabriel Aubry (United Kingdom) Will Stevens	Oreca 07	G	248	+9 Laps
6	LMP2	37	(China) Jackie Chan DC Racing	(China) Ho-Pin Tung (France) Gabriel Aubry (United Kingdom) Will Stevens	Gibson GK428 4.2 L V8	G	248	+9 Laps
7	LMP2	26	(Russia) G-Drive Racing	(Russia) Roman Rusinov (France) Jean-Éric Vergne (Netherlands) Job van Uitert	Oreca 07	M	248	+9 Laps
7	LMP2	26	(Russia) G-Drive Racing	(Russia) Roman Rusinov (France) Jean-Éric Vergne (Netherlands) Job van Uitert	Gibson GK428 4.2 L V8	M	248	+9 Laps
8	LMP2	36	(France) Signatech Alpine Elf	(France) Thomas Laurent (Brazil) André Negrão (France) Pierre Ragues	Oreca 07	M	248	+9 Laps
8	LMP2	36	(France) Signatech Alpine Elf	(France) Thomas Laurent (Brazil) André Negrão (France) Pierre Ragues	Gibson GK428 4.2 L V8	M	248	+9 Laps
9	LMP2	29	(Netherlands) Racing Team Nederland	(Netherlands) Giedo van der Garde (Netherlands) Frits van Eerd (Netherlands) Nyck de Vries	Oreca 07	M	247	+10 Laps
9	LMP2	29	(Netherlands) Racing Team Nederland	(Netherlands) Giedo van der Garde (Netherlands) Frits van Eerd (Netherlands) Nyck de Vries	Gibson GK428 4.2 L V8	M	247	+10 Laps
10	LMP2	42	(Switzerland) Cool Racing	(France) Nicolas Lapierre (Switzerland) Antonin Borga (Switzerland) Alexander Coigny	Oreca 07	M	245	+12 Laps
10	LMP2	42	(Switzerland) Cool Racing	(France) Nicolas Lapierre (Switzerland) Antonin Borga (Switzerland) Alexander Coigny	Gibson GL458 4.5 L V8	M	245	+12 Laps
11	LMP2	33	(Denmark) High Class Racing	(Denmark) Anders Fjordbach (United States) Mark Patterson (Japan) Kenta Yamashita	Oreca 07	G	244	+13 Laps
11	LMP2	33	(Denmark) High Class Racing	(Denmark) Anders Fjordbach (United States) Mark Patterson (Japan) Kenta Yamashita	Gibson GK428 4.2 L V8	G	244	+13 Laps
12	LMP2	47	(Italy) Cetilar Racing	(Italy) Andrea Belicchi (Italy) Roberto Lacorte (Italy) Giorgio Sernagiotto	Dallara P217	M	240	+17 Laps
12	LMP2	47	(Italy) Cetilar Racing	(Italy) Andrea Belicchi (Italy) Roberto Lacorte (Italy) Giorgio Sernagiotto	Gibson GK428 4.2 L V8	M	240	+17 Laps
13	**LMGTE Pro**	**95**	**(United Kingdom) Aston Martin Racing**	**(Denmark) Marco Sørensen** **(Denmark) Nicki Thiim**	**Aston Martin Vantage AMR GTE**	M	**235**	**+22 Laps**
13	**LMGTE Pro**	**95**	**(United Kingdom) Aston Martin Racing**	**(Denmark) Marco Sørensen** **(Denmark) Nicki Thiim**	**Aston Martin 4.0L Turbo V8**	M	**235**	**+22 Laps**
14	LMGTE Pro	71	(Italy) AF Corse	(Italy) Davide Rigon (Spain) Miguel Molina	Ferrari 488 GTE Evo	M	235	+22 Laps
14	LMGTE Pro	71	(Italy) AF Corse	(Italy) Davide Rigon (Spain) Miguel Molina	Ferrari F154CB 4.0L Turbo V8	M	235	+22 Laps
15	LMGTE Pro	97	(United Kingdom) Aston Martin Racing	(United Kingdom) Alex Lynn (Belgium) Maxime Martin	Aston Martin Vantage AMR GTE	M	235	+22 Laps
15	LMGTE Pro	97	(United Kingdom) Aston Martin Racing	(United Kingdom) Alex Lynn (Belgium) Maxime Martin	Aston Martin 4.0L Turbo V8	M	235	+22 Laps
16	LMGTE Pro	51	(Italy) AF Corse	(United Kingdom) James Calado (Italy) Alessandro Pier Guidi	Ferrari 488 GTE Evo	M	235	+22 Laps
16	LMGTE Pro	51	(Italy) AF Corse	(United Kingdom) James Calado (Italy) Alessandro Pier Guidi	Ferrari F154CB 4.0L Turbo V8	M	235	+22 Laps
17	LMGTE Pro	91	(Germany) Porsche GT Team	(Italy) Gianmaria Bruni (Austria) Richard Lietz	Porsche 911 RSR-19	M	233	+24 Laps
17	LMGTE Pro	91	(Germany) Porsche GT Team	(Italy) Gianmaria Bruni (Austria) Richard Lietz	Porsche 4.2L Flat-Six	M	233	+24 Laps
18	**LMGTE Am**	**57**	**(Germany) Team Project 1**	**(Netherlands) Jeroen Bleekemolen** **(Netherlands) Larry ten Voorde** **(United States) Ben Keating**	**Porsche 911 RSR**	M	**233**	**+24 Laps**
18	**LMGTE Am**	**57**	**(Germany) Team Project 1**	**(Netherlands) Jeroen Bleekemolen** **(Netherlands) Larry ten Voorde** **(United States) Ben Keating**	**Porsche 4.0L Flat 6**	M	**233**	**+24 Laps**
19	LMGTE Pro	92	(Germany) Porsche GT Team	(Denmark) Michael Christensen (France) Kévin Estre	Porsche 911 RSR-19	M	233	+24 Laps
19	LMGTE Pro	92	(Germany) Porsche GT Team	(Denmark) Michael Christensen (France) Kévin Estre	Porsche 4.2L Flat-Six	M	233	+24 Laps
20	LMGTE Am	98	(United Kingdom) Aston Martin Racing	(Canada) Paul Dalla Lana (United Kingdom) Darren Turner (United Kingdom) Ross Gunn	Aston Martin Vantage AMR GTE	M	233	+24 Laps
20	LMGTE Am	98	(United Kingdom) Aston Martin Racing	(Canada) Paul Dalla Lana (United Kingdom) Darren Turner (United Kingdom) Ross Gunn	Aston Martin 4.0L Turbo V8	M	233	+24 Laps
21	LMGTE Am	86	(United Kingdom) Gulf Racing	(United Kingdom) Ben Barker (United Kingdom) Michael Wainwright (United Kingdom) Andrew Watson	Porsche 911 RSR	M	233	+24 Laps
21	LMGTE Am	86	(United Kingdom) Gulf Racing	(United Kingdom) Ben Barker (United Kingdom) Michael Wainwright (United Kingdom) Andrew Watson	Porsche 4.0L Flat 6	M	233	+24 Laps
22	LMGTE Am	83	(Italy) AF Corse	(France) Emmanuel Collard (Denmark) Nicklas Nielsen (France) François Perrodo	Ferrari 488 GTE Evo	M	232	+25 Laps
22	LMGTE Am	83	(Italy) AF Corse	(France) Emmanuel Collard (Denmark) Nicklas Nielsen (France) François Perrodo	Ferrari F154CB 4.0L Turbo V8	M	232	+25 Laps
23	LMGTE Am	54	(Italy) AF Corse	(Italy) Francesco Castellacci (Italy) Giancarlo Fisichella (Switzerland) Thomas Flohr	Ferrari 488 GTE Evo	M	232	+25 Laps
23	LMGTE Am	54	(Italy) AF Corse	(Italy) Francesco Castellacci (Italy) Giancarlo Fisichella (Switzerland) Thomas Flohr	Ferrari F154CB 4.0L Turbo V8	M	232	+25 Laps
24	LMGTE Am	77	(Germany) Dempsey-Proton Racing	(Germany) Christian Ried (Italy) Riccardo Pera (Australia) Matt Campbell	Porsche 911 RSR	M	231	+26 Laps
24	LMGTE Am	77	(Germany) Dempsey-Proton Racing	(Germany) Christian Ried (Italy) Riccardo Pera (Australia) Matt Campbell	Porsche 4.0L Flat 6	M	231	+26 Laps
25	LMGTE Am	70	(Japan) MR Racing	(Monaco) Olivier Beretta (Japan) Kei Cozzolino (Japan) Motoaki Ishikawa	Ferrari 488 GTE Evo	M	230	+27 Laps
25	LMGTE Am	70	(Japan) MR Racing	(Monaco) Olivier Beretta (Japan) Kei Cozzolino (Japan) Motoaki Ishikawa	Ferrari F154CB 4.0L Turbo V8	M	230	+27 Laps
26	LMGTE Am	62	(United Kingdom) Red River Sport	(United Kingdom) Bonamy Grimes (United Kingdom) Charles Hollings (United Kingdom) Johnny Mowlem	Ferrari 488 GTE Evo	M	229	+28 Laps
26	LMGTE Am	62	(United Kingdom) Red River Sport	(United Kingdom) Bonamy Grimes (United Kingdom) Charles Hollings (United Kingdom) Johnny Mowlem	Ferrari F154CB 4.0L Turbo V8	M	229	+28 Laps
27	LMGTE Am	56	(Germany) Team Project 1	(Italy) Matteo Cairoli (Denmark) David Heinemeier Hansson (Norway) Egidio Perfetti	Porsche 911 RSR	M	214	+43 Laps
27	LMGTE Am	56	(Germany) Team Project 1	(Italy) Matteo Cairoli (Denmark) David Heinemeier Hansson (Norway) Egidio Perfetti	Porsche 4.0L Flat 6	M	214	+43 Laps
DNF	LMP1	6	(United Kingdom) Team LNT	(United Kingdom) Michael Simpson (United States) Chris Dyson (United Kingdom) Guy Smith	Ginetta G60-LT-P1	M	195	6:15:00.212
DNF	LMP1	6	(United Kingdom) Team LNT	(United Kingdom) Michael Simpson (United States) Chris Dyson (United Kingdom) Guy Smith	AER P60C 2.4 L Turbo V6	M	195	6:15:00.212
DNF	LMGTE Am	90	(United Kingdom) TF Sport	(United Kingdom) Jonathan Adam (Republic of Ireland) Charlie Eastwood (Turkey) Salih Yoluç	Aston Martin Vantage AMR GTE	M	178	7:35:48.349
DNF	LMGTE Am	90	(United Kingdom) TF Sport	(United Kingdom) Jonathan Adam (Republic of Ireland) Charlie Eastwood (Turkey) Salih Yoluç	Aston Martin 4.0L Turbo V8	M	178	7:35:48.349
DNF	LMP1	5	(United Kingdom) Team LNT	(United Kingdom) Charlie Robertson (United Kingdom) Ben Hanley (United Kingdom) Jordan King	Ginetta G60-LT-P1	M	143	4:34:13.454
DNF	LMP1	5	(United Kingdom) Team LNT	(United Kingdom) Charlie Robertson (United Kingdom) Ben Hanley (United Kingdom) Jordan King	AER P60C 2.4 L Turbo V6	M	143	4:34:13.454
DNF	LMGTE Am	88	(Germany) Dempsey-Proton Racing	(Austria) Thomas Preining (Belgium) Adrien de Leener (United Arab Emirates) Khaled Al Qubaisi	Porsche 911 RSR	M	109	3:46:55.748
DNF	LMGTE Am	88	(Germany) Dempsey-Proton Racing	(Austria) Thomas Preining (Belgium) Adrien de Leener (United Arab Emirates) Khaled Al Qubaisi	Porsche 4.0L Flat 6	M	109	3:46:55.748
