= Rebellion R13 =

Sports car racing prototype

Rebellion R13 Alpine A480
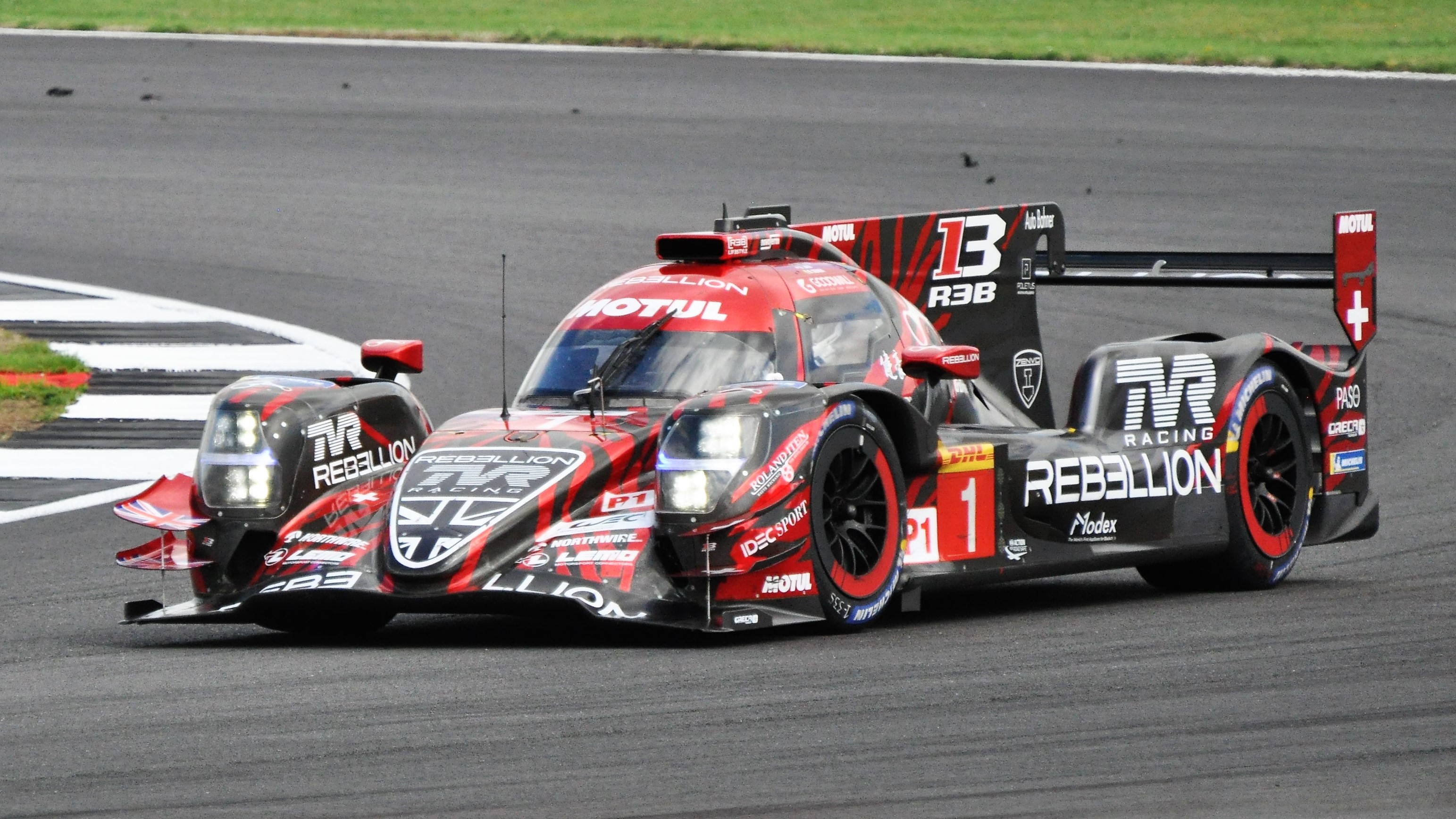
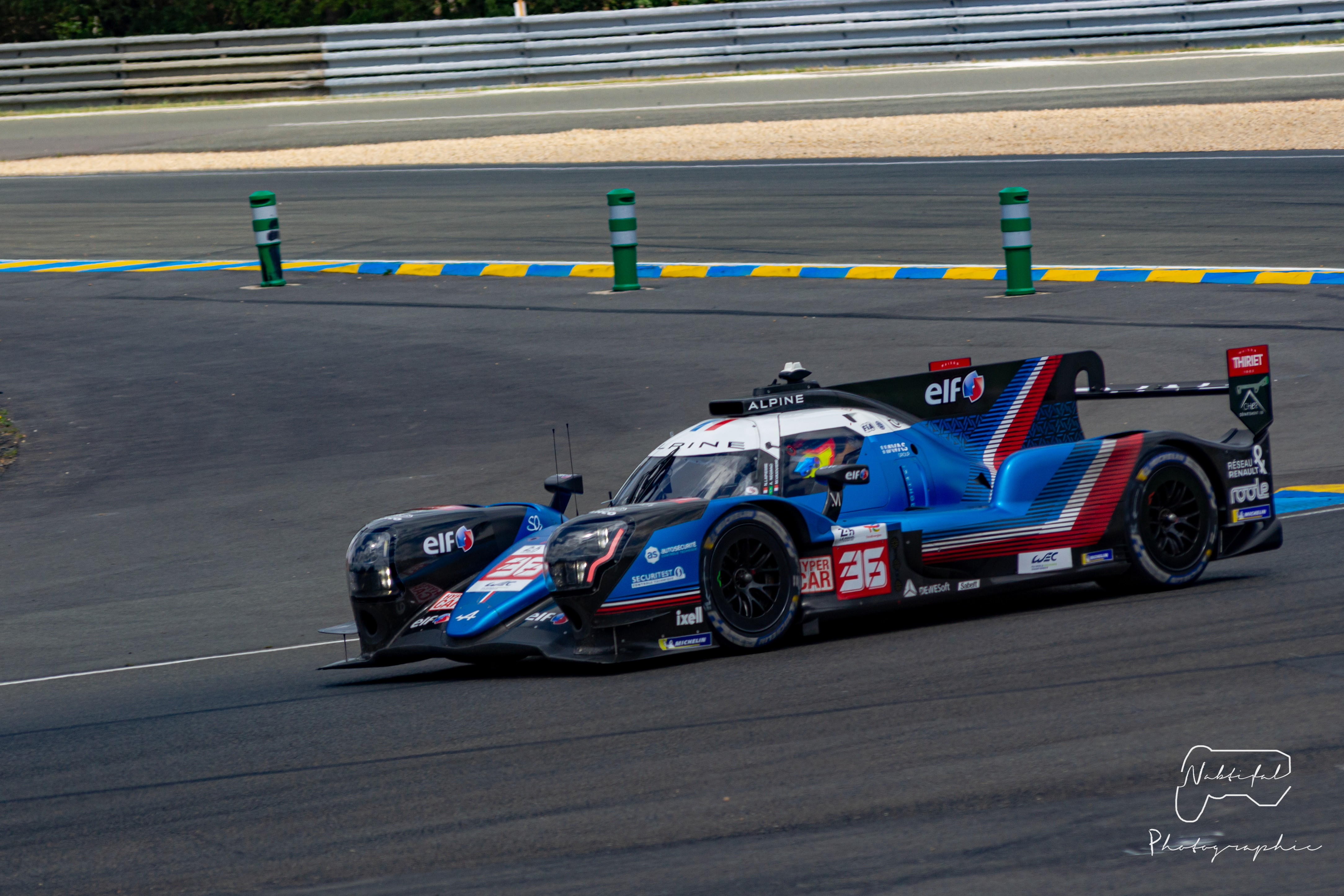
- The No. 1 Rebellion R13 LMP1 at the 2018 6 Hours of Silverstone Alpine A480 Le Mans Hypercar at the 2022 24 Hours of Le Mans
- Category: Le Mans Prototype (LMP1); Le Mans Hypercar (LMH)
- Constructor: Rebellion (Oreca)
- Designer: David Floury
- Predecessor: Rebellion R-One
- Successor: Alpine A424 (Alpine A480)

Technical specifications
- Chassis: Carbon fibre composite monocoque
- Suspension (front): Double wishbone, push rod operated over damper
- Suspension (rear): Double wishbone, push rod operated over damper
- Length: 4,645 mm (182.9 in)
- Width: 1,895 mm (74.6 in)
- Height: 1,045 mm (41.1 in)
- Axle track: front 1,560 mm (61.4 in); rear 1,550 mm (61.0 in)
- Wheelbase: 2,905 mm (114.4 in)
- Engine: Gibson GL458 4.5 L V8 NA, 9000 rpm maximum revolutions mid-engined, longitudinally mounted
- Transmission: Xtrac P1159C 6-speed sequential manual, Xtrac Viscous mechanical locking differential
- Power: LMP1 spec: 670 bhp (500 kW; 679 PS); Hypercar spec: 625 bhp (466 kW; 634 PS)
- Weight: LMP1 spec: 833 kg (1,836 lb); Hypercar spec: 900 kg (1,984 lb)
- Fuel: TotalEnergies
- Lubricants: Motul
- Brakes: AP Racing carbon 380/355mm with AP Racing Monobloc 6-piston calipers
- Tyres: Michelin slicks with BBS one-piece forged alloys, 31/71-18

Competition history
- Notable entrants: Rebellion R13; (Switzerland) Rebellion Racing; Alpine A480; (France) Alpine Elf Matmut
- Notable drivers: (Switzerland) Neel Jani; (Brazil) Bruno Senna; (Germany) André Lotterer; (Switzerland) Mathias Beche; (France) Thomas Laurent; (United States) Gustavo Menezes; (France) Nathanaël Berthon; (France) Norman Nato; (Brazil) Pipo Derani; (France) Loïc Duval; (Switzerland) Louis Delétraz; (France) Romain Dumas; (France) Nicolas Lapierre; (Brazil) André Negrão; (France) Matthieu Vaxivière
- Debut: Rebellion R13; 2018 6 Hours of Spa-Francorchamps; Alpine A480; 2021 6 Hours of Spa-Francorchamps
- First win: Rebellion R13; 2019 4 Hours of Shanghai; Alpine A480; 2022 1000 Miles of Sebring
- Last win: Rebellion R13; 2020 Lone Star Le Mans; Alpine A480; 2022 6 Hours of Monza
- Last event: Rebellion R13; 2020 24 Hours of Le Mans; Alpine A480; 2022 8 Hours of Bahrain
Races	Wins	Podiums	Poles	F/Laps
27	5	24	6	6
- Teams' Championships: 0
- Constructors' Championships: 0
- Drivers' Championships: 0

The Rebellion R13 is a sports prototype racing car built by French constructor Oreca on behalf of Swiss-based team Rebellion Racing. It is a variation of the Oreca 07, created to compete in the LMP1 class. It would later be renamed by Alpine to Alpine A480 when it was rebadged to run as a grandfathered into the Hypercar class in 2021 and 2022.

== Competition history ==
=== 2018–19 ===
The R13 debuted in the FIA World Endurance Championship during its Super Season. Over the course of the season it achieved victory and fastest lap at the 2018 6 Hours of Silverstone, with further podiums at both Spa races, Fuji and the 2018 24 Hours of Le Mans, for a total of 6 for the season. Rebellion finished in 2nd place in the World Endurance LMP1 Championship with 134 points, making the R13 the best of the non-hybrid cars.

=== 2019–20 ===
For the 2019-20 season, Rebellion reduced their full-season effort to a single car; the #1 driven by Menezes, Nato and Senna, with a second car appearing in select European races. This would later translate to a second R13, the #3, appearing in the 2019 4 Hours of Silverstone, where it finished 3rd and the 2019 24 Hours of Le Mans, where it finished 4th, though those results would not count towards the championship as only the #1 was eligible for points.

For that season, the WEC introduced a system of success ballast, which slowed down cars' performance according to their results in the championship, with the aim of equaling the performance of non-hybrid cars, the R13 and the Ginetta G60-LT-P1, with that of the Toyota TS050 Hybrid. This system allowed the R13 to be more competitive with the TS050, and the #1 Rebellion would take 2 victories during the season at Shanghai and at Austin. At Shanghai, Rebellion would also become the first privateer team to get an overall pole position in WEC history, with that being also the first of the 4 consecutive pole positions the R13 would take during the season, with the rest coming in Bahrain, Austin, and Spa. The car would also set 3 fastest laps during the season, at Austin, Spa and Le Mans. Rebellion would skip the season finale at Bahrain after Toyota clinched the LMP1 teams' title at Le Mans, finishing second with 145 points and having scored podiums at all 7 rounds of the season it had been a part of.

== Alpine A480 ==
On September 10, 2020, French-language magazine Auto Hebdo reported that the Signatech Alpine team competing in LMP2 during the 2019–20 WEC season would step up to the new Le Mans Hypercar class for 2021 with a re-badged R13, with agreement that LMH rules in the initial season would include an allowance to re-homologate ("grandfather") non-hybrid LMP1 cars. The report was confirmed by Alpine on September 12. On January 21, 2021, the entry list for the 2021 FIA World Endurance Championship season was released, where the entry was confirmed and the car rename to Alpine A480 made official, with André Negrão being one of the drivers. The rest of the line-up was announced on January 26, with Nicolas Lapierre and Matthieu Vaxivière joining Negrão.

The initial LMH rules targeted a significantly lower performance than 2020 LMP1, adding around ten seconds to a lap of Circuit de la Sarthe, which made significant changes necessary to grandfathered cars to achieve homologation. These included:

- agreement to use a single aero kit - the Le Mans focused "low-downforce kit" - at all circuits through the season, a change from the WEC LMP1 rules and practice of mixing high-downforce and low-downforce kits as appropriate to the circuits.
- Participation in the new Hypercar class Balance of Performance (BoP) system to ensure parity between entrants in the class. The BoP envelope was set against the significantly lower target lap times and therefore had a high impact on the Alpine car originally built to meet the higher LMP1 specs and not designed for a BoP ruleset.

Furthermore, whilst changes to the fuel tank were not necessary to meet homologation, the fuel capacity within the chassis was originally designed around the LMP2 ruleset (75 litres). However, the Hypercar rules were designed around 12-lap stints for the Le Mans race. Once the changes for LMP1 and then grandfathering had been made, the fuel consumption of the car would not allow these 12 laps fuel stints from a 75-litre tank; and in the Rebellion era for this car it achieved only 11 laps even with LMP1's lower weight. For LMH, the BoP fuelling limit for the A480 was set to allow 12 laps but it was not possible to physically fit this allowance into the smaller tank, and Oreca were not able to find a workaround compatible with homologation in time for the inaugural race at Spa, where the disadvantage was enough to add an extra fuel stop compared to Toyota.

=== 2021 ===
Ahead of the formal pre-season testing sessions for registered 2021 entrants (known as the "Prologue" in WEC), the initial Balance of Performance for the A480's weight was increased to 930 kg (from LMP1's 824 kg) and its peak power output reduced to 610 hp (450 kW). The large weight penalty was necessary for parity with the heavier but more powerful Toyota GR010 Hybrid.

During the 2021 season Alpine managed to score podiums in all six races, while also taking pole position and fastest lap at the 8 Hours of Portimão, scoring 128 points and finishing second in the Hypercar World Endurance Championship, never overcoming the stint-length deficit caused by their smaller fuel tank. Lapierre, Negrão and Vaxivière finished 3rd as a crew in the Hypercar World Endurance Drivers' Championship with the same points tally.

=== 2022 ===
On 16 February 2022 Alpine announced that the car would complete for a further and final season with the same driver line-up of Lapierre, Negrão and Vaxivière.

== Complete World Endurance Championship results ==
Results in bold indicate pole position. Results in italics indicate fastest lap.

Year	Entrant	Class	Drivers	No.	1	2	3	4	5	6	7	8	Points	Pos
2018–19	(Switzerland) Rebellion Racing	LMP1			SPA	LMN	SIL	FUJ	SHA	SEB	SPA	LMN	**134**^{1}	2nd
2018–19	(Switzerland) Rebellion Racing	LMP1	(Switzerland) Neel Jani	1	DSQ	4	2	3	4	Ret	5	4	**134**^{1}	2nd
2018–19	(Switzerland) Rebellion Racing	LMP1	(Brazil) Bruno Senna	1	DSQ	4	WD	3	4	Ret	5	4	**134**^{1}	2nd
2018–19	(Switzerland) Rebellion Racing	LMP1	(Germany) André Lotterer	1	DSQ	4	2	3	4		5	4	**134**^{1}	2nd
2018–19	(Switzerland) Rebellion Racing	LMP1	(Switzerland) Mathias Beche	1						Ret			**134**^{1}	2nd
2018–19	(Switzerland) Rebellion Racing	LMP1	(France) Thomas Laurent	3	3	3	1	Ret	5	7	2	5	**134**^{1}	2nd
2018–19	(Switzerland) Rebellion Racing	LMP1	(United States) Gustavo Menezes	3	3	3	1	Ret	5	7	2	5	**134**^{1}	2nd
2018–19	(Switzerland) Rebellion Racing	LMP1	(Switzerland) Mathias Beche	3	3	3	1	Ret	5				**134**^{1}	2nd
2018–19	(Switzerland) Rebellion Racing	LMP1	(France) Nathanaël Berthon	3						7	2	5	**134**^{1}	2nd
2019–20	(Switzerland) Rebellion Racing	LMP1			SIL	FUJ	SHA	BHR	COA	SPA	LMN	BHR	**145**^{2}	2nd
2019–20	(Switzerland) Rebellion Racing	LMP1	(United States) Gustavo Menezes	1	9	3	**1**	**3**	**1**	**3**	2		**145**^{2}	2nd
2019–20	(Switzerland) Rebellion Racing	LMP1	(France) Norman Nato	1	9	3	**1**	**3**	**1**	**3**	2		**145**^{2}	2nd
2019–20	(Switzerland) Rebellion Racing	LMP1	(Brazil) Bruno Senna	1	9	3	**1**	**3**	**1**	**3**	2		**145**^{2}	2nd
2019–20	(Switzerland) Rebellion Racing	LMP1	(France) Nathanaël Berthon	3	3						4		**145**^{2}	2nd
2019–20	(Switzerland) Rebellion Racing	LMP1	(Brazil) Pipo Derani	3	3								**145**^{2}	2nd
2019–20	(Switzerland) Rebellion Racing	LMP1	(France) Loïc Duval	3	3								**145**^{2}	2nd
2019–20	(Switzerland) Rebellion Racing	LMP1	(Switzerland) Louis Delétraz	3							4		**145**^{2}	2nd
2019–20	(Switzerland) Rebellion Racing	LMP1	(France) Romain Dumas	3							4		**145**^{2}	2nd
2021	(France) Alpine Elf Matmut	Hypercar			SPA	POR	MON	LMN	BHR	BHR			**128**	2nd
2021	(France) Alpine Elf Matmut	Hypercar	(France) Nicolas Lapierre	36	2	**3**	2	3	3	3			**128**	2nd
2021	(France) Alpine Elf Matmut	Hypercar	(Brazil) André Negrão	36	2	**3**	2	3	3	3			**128**	2nd
2021	(France) Alpine Elf Matmut	Hypercar	(France) Matthieu Vaxivière	36	2	**3**	2	3	3	3			**128**	2nd
2022	(France) Alpine Elf Team	Hypercar			SEB	SPA	LMN	MON	FUJ	BHR			**144**	2nd
2022	(France) Alpine Elf Team	Hypercar	(France) Nicolas Lapierre	36	**1**	2	23	1	3	3			**144**	2nd
2022	(France) Alpine Elf Team	Hypercar	(Brazil) André Negrão	36	**1**	2	23	1	3	3			**144**	2nd
2022	(France) Alpine Elf Team	Hypercar	(France) Matthieu Vaxivière	36	**1**	2	23	1	3	3			**144**	2nd

^{1} Only the highest-finishing car for each manufacturer scored points.
^{2} Only the results of the full-season entry #1 counted towards the standings.

== See also ==
- Toyota TS050 Hybrid
- Ginetta G60-LT-P1
- BR Engineering BR1
- CLM P1/01
