= Ginetta G60-LT-P1 =

Non-hybrid Le Mans Prototype racing car

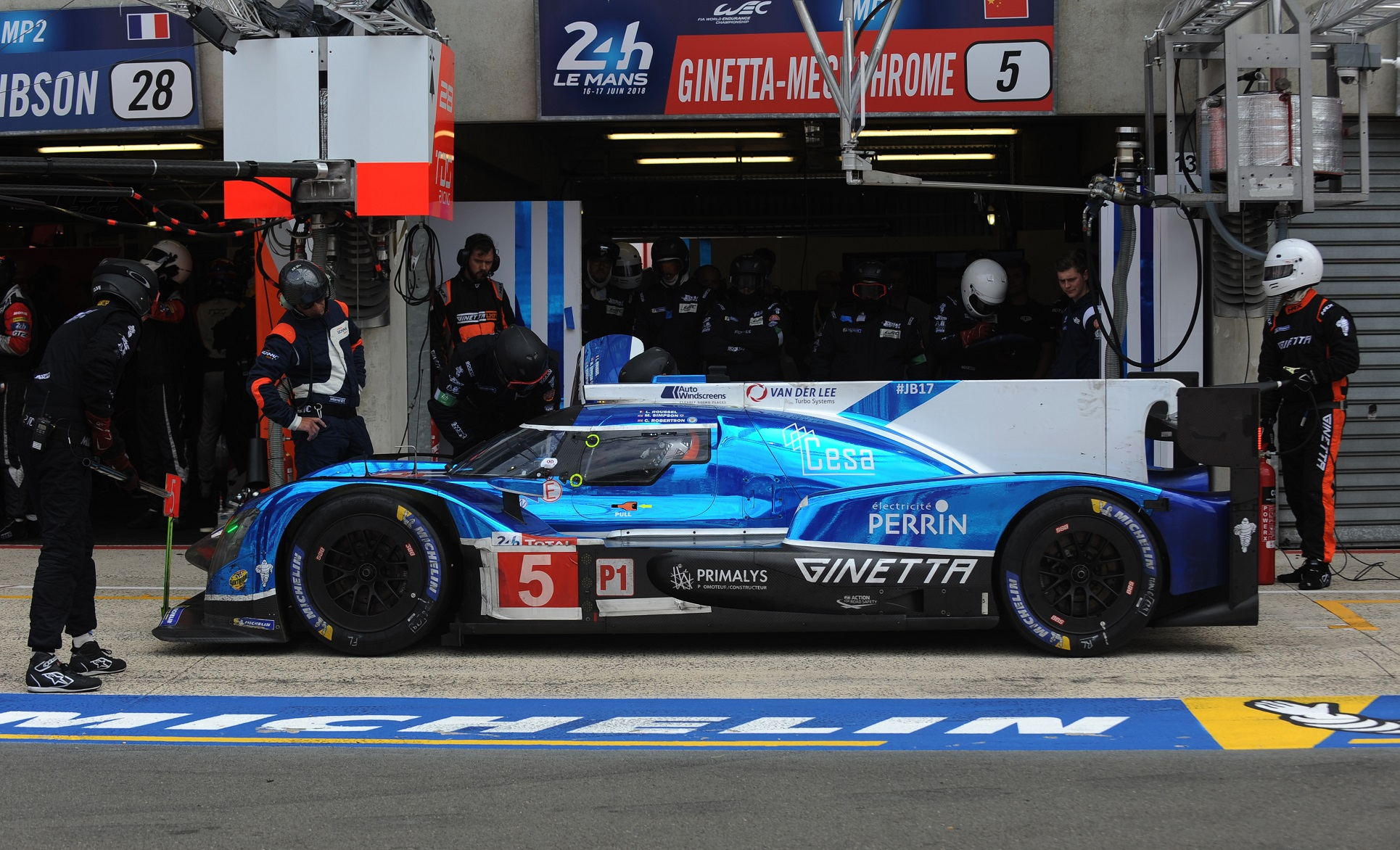
- The No. 5 CEFC TRSM Racing G60-LT-P1 during the 2018 24 Hours of Le Mans.
- Category: Le Mans Prototype (LMP1)
- Designers: Ewan Baldry (technical director); Andy Lewis (Head of Aerodynamics); Stephan van der Burg (Design Engineer); Adrian Reynard (design consultant); Paolo Catone (design consultant); Alun Denbury (styling)

Technical specifications
- Chassis: Carbon Fibre Composite Monocoque
- Engine: Mecachrome V634P1 95º 3,396 cubic centimetres (207.2 cu in) Turbocharged V6; AER P60B/C 2,398 cubic centimetres (146.3 cu in) Turbocharged V6
- Transmission: X-Trac 7-Speed Sequential Manual
- Power: 650 bhp (659 PS; 485 kW)
- Weight: 833kg (1836.5 lb)
- Fuel: Total
- Lubricants: Various
- Brakes: AP Racing Carbon-Ceramic
- Tyres: Michelin

Competition history
- Notable entrants: (China) CEFC TRSM Racing (United Kingdom) Team LNT
- Notable drivers: (United Kingdom) Dean Stoneman (France) Léo Roussel (United Kingdom) Oliver Turvey (United Kingdom) Oliver Rowland (United Kingdom) Mike Simpson (United Kingdom) Charlie Robertson (United Kingdom) Alex Brundle (United Kingdom) Ben Hanley (Russia) Egor Orudzhev (United Kingdom) Guy Smith (Italy) Luca Ghiotto (United Kingdom) Oliver Jarvis (United Kingdom) Jordan King
- Debut: 2018 24 Hours of Le Mans
- Last event: 2019 8 Hours of Bahrain
| Races | Wins | Poles |
|---|---|---|
| 5 | 0 | 0 |
- Teams' Championships: 0
- Drivers' Championships: 0

The Ginetta G60-LT-P1 is a non-hybrid Le Mans Prototype built by Ginetta for use in the LMP1 category for the FIA World Endurance Championship, as well as the 24 Hours of Le Mans. The G60-LT-P1 had its competition debut at the 2018 24 Hours Of Le Mans, after financial issues led to the withdrawal of the car at the initial round of the 2018–19 FIA World Endurance Championship, the 6 Hours of Spa Francorchamps.

== Development ==
=== Initial Development (Ginetta-Mecachrome) ===
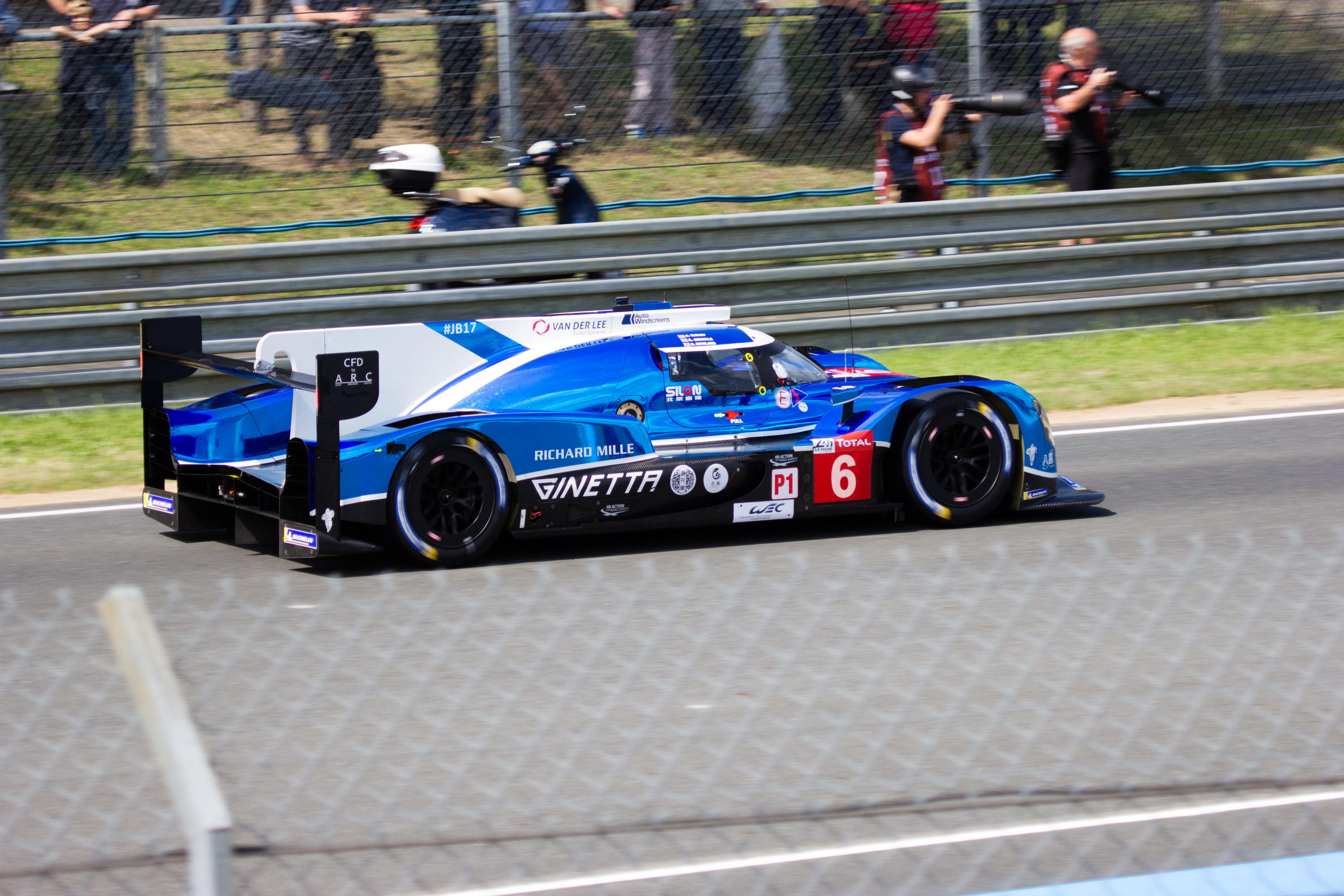
#6 Ginetta G60-LT-P1-Mecachrome, 2018 24 Hours of Le Mans

On 4 January 2017, Ginetta announced a new LMP1 chassis, built to the 2018 LMP1 non-hybrid rules, and designed by Adrian Reynard, as well as Paolo Catone. The car would mark the return of Ginetta to the top tier of endurance racing, LMP1, 8 years after the previous LMP1 built by Ginetta, the Ginetta-Zytek GZ09S was made obsolete by the 2011 LMP1 regulations. The car was launched at the Autosport International 2018 motorsport tradeshow. The car was initially developed using Computational Fluid Dynamics (CFD). A 50% developmental scale model of the car also undertook several wind tunnel runs, at the Williams Advanced Engineering wind tunnel, with the initial runs being done in June 2017. The car was initially expected to undergo its first tests in September 2017, but it only underwent its first straight line test, at Leeds East Airport, on 19 January 2018. Prior to the 2018–19 FIA WEC Season, the car was also tested at Snetterton Circuit, as well as at Motorland Aragon.

=== Ginetta-AER ===
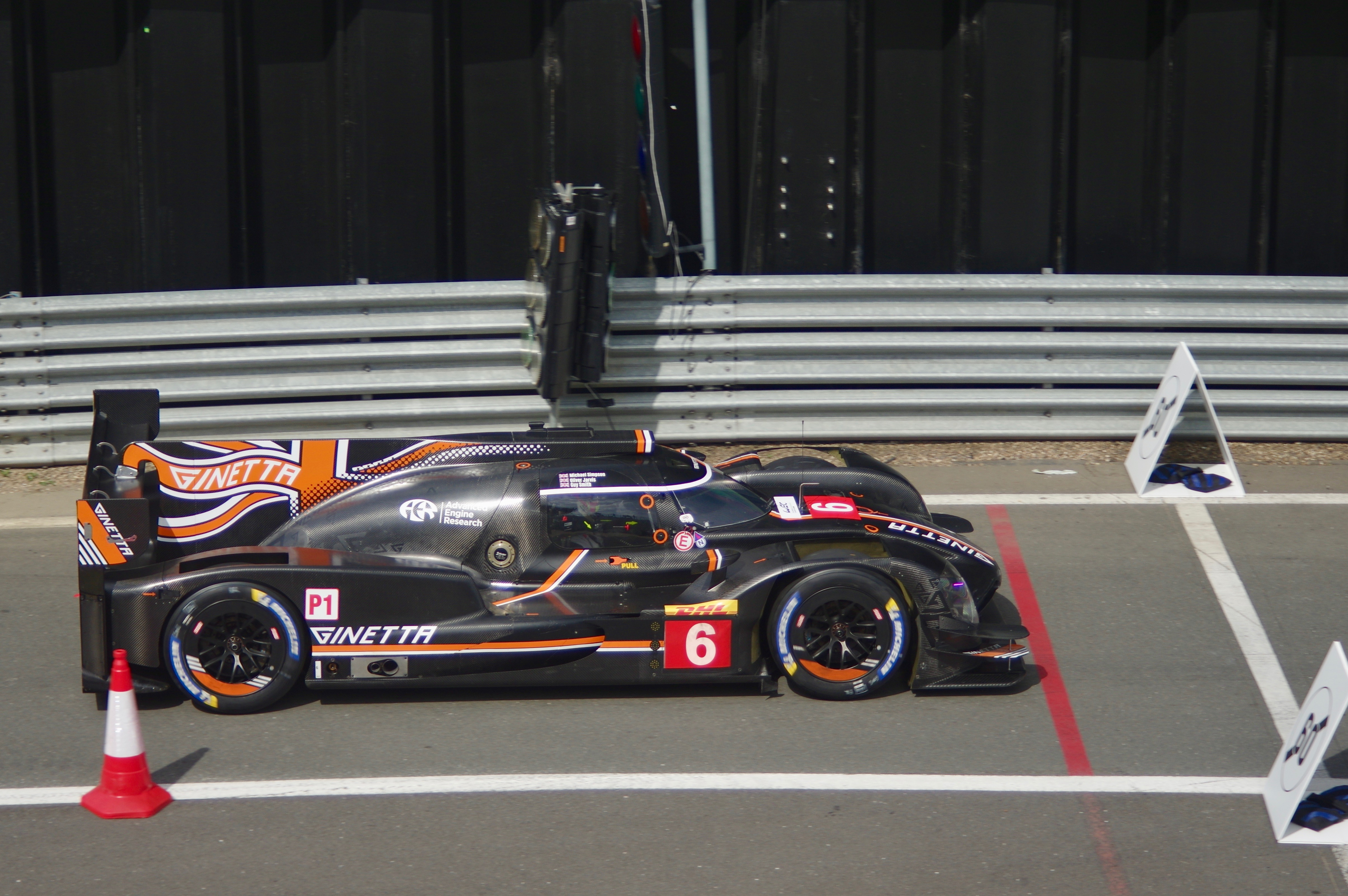
#6 Ginetta G60-LT-P1-AER, 2019 4 Hours of Silverstone Note that the exhaust has moved to the lower sidepod; on the Mecachrome, it was located at the rear of the engine cover

Following the cars debut at the 2018 24 Hours of Le Mans, due to the refusal of Mecachrome to increase power output of the engine, and the engine being underpowered on its debut, Ginetta announced that it would part ways with Mecachrome, opting to install the AER P60B in place of the Mecachrome V634P1. The engine was successfully test fired on the car in early August.

In June 2019 a two car Ginetta-AER entry was announced for the 2019–20 FIA World Endurance Championship from Team LNT.

After the conclusion of its private testing programme at the Ciudad del Motor de Aragón, the Circuit de Spa-Francorchamps and the Circuit Paul Ricard, Ginetta announced that both cars would be powered by upgraded AER P60C engines, replacing the AER P60B engines. It was also announced that both Ginettas were also set to appear at the 2019/20 FIA WEC Prologue test at the Circuit de Barcelona-Catalunya, in Spain on 24 July 2019.

== Competition history ==
=== 2018–2019 FIA World Endurance Championship ===
Initially in October 2017, a Ginetta announced that it had sold 3 chassis to an unknown buyer, although plans for the sale subsequently fell through. Later, Manor Endurance Racing was announced to be purchasing 1 chassis, before a 2nd car was announced, with the cars to be run in collaboration with Talent Racing Sports, under the CEFC TRSM banner. However, on the planned debut of the cars at the 2018 6 Hours of Spa-Francorchamps, the cars sat out most of the Practice and Qualifying sessions, with the team initially refusing to disclose why. Subsequently, it was revealed by Ginetta that they had refused to release the cars to run, as the team had been late on its payments to Ginetta.

During the Test day for the 24 Hours of Le Mans, the cars were lacking in pace, even falling behind 2 LMP2s in the testing times, partly due to the fact that the car was not in low-drag trim. The cars qualified last in the LMP1 class, with the #5 falling behind 4 LMP2s. During the race, the #6 broke down after 9 hours, while the #5 finished the race, being the 2nd last classified finisher. However, it was subjected to post-race penalties, for drive time limits and was subsequently demoted to being the last classified finisher. Following the 24 Hours Of Le Mans, the #6 was originally supposed to continue its planned full-season program. However, due to the refusal of Mecachrome to increase engine power of the engine, and a late change of engine to the AER P60B, the car was unable to participate in the 6 Hours of Silverstone.

Subsequently, however, it was reported that Manor Endurance Racing had distanced itself from the CEFC TRSM team with immediate effect, and would no longer be operating the entry. The #6 was also not included in the 6 Hours Of Fuji entry list, due to the car not being ready for competition. The #6 was also revealed to not be on the entry list for the 6 Hours of Shanghai. Ginetta had planned to re-enter one of the now AER engined cars into the 2019 6 Hours of Spa-Francorchamps, but was unable to do so, after a disagreement with the championship over the hefty fines incurred for the non-appearance of the CEFC TRSM entry, post Le Mans, which had been lodged as a full season entrant initially. Ginetta chairman Lawrence Tomlinson also revealed that he had filed an entry for the 2019 24 Hours of Le Mans, but it had been rejected.

| Team | SPA (Belgium) | LMS (France) | SIL (United Kingdom) | FUJ (Japan) | SHA (China) | SEB (United States) | SPA (Belgium) | LMS (France) | Total points | Pos. |
|---|---|---|---|---|---|---|---|---|---|---|
| (China) CEFC TRSM Racing | WD | 41 | WD | WD | | | | | 1^{1} | 6th |

^{1} Only the highest-finishing car for each Team scored points.

=== 2019–20 FIA World Endurance Championship ===
On 23 May 2019, Ginetta lodged 2 entries for the 2019–20 FIA World Endurance Championship, under the Team LNT banner, with the aim of finding a customer team to run the cars for the season. Ginetta chairman Lawrence Tomlinson however declared that should Ginetta be unable to find a customer, Ginetta's works team, Team LNT would run at least one car for the full-season. Prior to the championship's official pre-season test, the WEC Prologue, held at the Circuit de Barcelona-Catalunya, Ginetta announced a test-roster of drivers, which included Guy Smith, Luca Ghiotto, Stéphane Sarrazin, Egor Orudzhev, Mathias Beche, Stéphane Richelmi, alongside Ginetta factory drivers Mike Simpson, and Charlie Robertson. Following the Prologue tests, the drivers gave positive feedback about the car, with Orudzhev being quoted that the car had the potential to surprise and be competitive, while Sarrazin said he was convinced by the potential the car had shown at the Prologue.

On 13 August 2019, Ginetta announced that for the season opening 4 Hours of Silverstone, the team would run Egor Orudzhev, Ben Hanley and Charlie Robertson in the #5 car, while the #6 car would see Chris Dyson, Guy Smith, alongside Mike Simpson. On 28 August 2019, it was later announced that Oliver Jarvis would be standing in for Dyson, due to a wrist injury Dyson had received while competing in the Trans-Am Series. At the 4 Hours of Silverstone, the #5 car would score a 4th place position, which was recognised as a 3rd place result in the championship standings, as a result of the actual 3rd placed car, the #3 Rebellion R13 being entered on a race-by-race basis, and therefore being ineligible to score points towards the World Endurance LMP1 Championship for the team. The #6 car on the other hand finished down the order in 28th, 12 laps down on its sister car, after having an eventful race, with the car making multiple trips to the garage, following a series of incidents, with the car first triggering a full course yellow within 30 minutes of the start, after shedding its right-rear wheel, and later colliding with the #71 AF Corse Ferrari 488 GTE to bring out the second safety car of the race.

On 17 September 2019, Ginetta announced its drivers for the 2019 6 Hours of Fuji, with the highlight of the announcement being the addition of Formula 2 driver Luca Ghiotto, making his sports car debut with the team, after having tested with the team at the Prologue in July. Ghiotto would share the #5 Ginetta with Ben Hanley and Egor Orudzhev, while Ginetta factory driver Charlie Robertson would move to the #6 car, taking the place of Oliver Jarvis, who had been a last minute replacement for Chris Dyson. Dyson would not be racing, due to a clash with the Trans-Am Series, and where he is currently in title contention. Robertson would share the #6 Ginetta with Mike Simpson and Guy Smith. The cars would finish in 9th for the #6, and 11th for the #5, with the #5 car suffering a front left brake issue saw the car needing to return to the garage. The #6 on the other hand, would finish 9th, in what was a race where the car charged from starting 1 lap down, and at the back of the grid, to fourth overall, until a late-race penalty saw the #6 dealt a massive 6 minutes stop and hold in the pitlane, relegating the car to a ninth-placed finish.

On 23 October 2019, Ginetta announced its driver lineup for the 2019 4 Hours of Shanghai, with the #5 car seeing Ghiotto being replaced by Jordan King, while Orudzhev and Hanley would continue in the #5, and the #6 car would retain its Fuji lineup of Mike Simpson, Guy Smith, and Charlie Robertson. Chris Dyson, who had originally been due to drive the full season with Team LNT, was announced to be skipping Shanghai due to business commitments, and would instead join the team at the 8 Hours of Bahrain.

On 26 November 2019, Ginetta announced its driver lineup for the 2019 8 Hours of Bahrain, with the #5 car seeing King and Hanley continue, while Orudzhev would be replaced by Robertson, who would be transferred back to make room for Chris Dyson in the #6. Mike Simpson and Guy Smith would continue in the #6. The team would suffer a double retirement at the race, after the #5 started on the front row of the grid, and was subsequently involved in a collision with the #1 Rebellion R13 at Turn 2.

On 3 February 2020, on an updated entry list for the 2020 Lone Star Le Mans, it was revealed that Team LNT with its pair of Ginetta G60-LT-P1s had been removed from the entry list. Initially, the entry list had stated that the team was to run with the same driver lineups as at Bahrain. Ginetta later released a statement, confirming its withdrawal from the event. Ginetta's reason for withdrawing was due to the need for significant maintenance on both cars following Bahrain, and that the cancellation of the earlier WEC race in Brazil and the new race at COTA meant it was impossible to do the planned work at Ginetta's North America base, located in Virginia. It also added that following the 2019 8 Hours of Bahrain, both cars had been shipped back to the Ginetta factory in the United Kingdom and had yet to arrive.

On 17 July 2020, it was revealed that Ginetta had trimmed down its entry for the 2020 24 Hours of Le Mans to a single car.

On 20 July 2020 the entry list for the 2020 6 Hours of Spa-Francorchamps was released, with both Team LNT Ginettas falling off the entry list for the race; both had been initially expected to return to competition at the 2020 1000 Miles of Sebring, which was cancelled just days before the event had been due to run. Ginetta chairman Lawrence Tomlinson said the impacts of the coronavirus pandemic hit the British constructor’s LMP1 program financially, which led to the Team LNT squad withdrawing from the Total 6 Hours of Spa, with the backlog created by the UK shutdown on the company’s other business operations also playing a role in the decision.

On 21 July 2020, it was announced that Ginetta would wind down its LMP1 programme with the factory Team LNT squad, with the team expected to skip the final round at Bahrain, while aborting its previous plan to campaign the G60-LT-P1 for the 2021 season.

| Team | SIL (United Kingdom) | FUJ (Japan) | SHA (China) | BHR (Bahrain) | COA (United States) | SPA (Belgium) | LMS (France) | BHR (Bahrain) | Total points | Pos. |
|---|---|---|---|---|---|---|---|---|---|---|
| (United Kingdom) Team LNT | 3 | 9 | 4 | Ret | WD | | | | 29^{1} | 3rd |

^{1} Only the highest-finishing car for each Team scored points.

=== 24 Hours of Le Mans ===
| Year | Entrant | No. | Drivers | Class | Laps | Pos. | Class Pos. |
|---|---|---|---|---|---|---|---|
| 2018 | (China) CEFC TRSM Racing | 5 | (United Kingdom) Charlie Robertson (France) Léo Roussel (United Kingdom) Mike Simpson | LMP1 | 283 | 41st | 5th |
| 2018 | (China) CEFC TRSM Racing | 6 | (United Kingdom) Oliver Rowland (United Kingdom) Alex Brundle (United Kingdom) Oliver Turvey | LMP1 | 137 | DNF | DNF |
