= 2019 6 Hours of Fuji =

Sports car endurance race held at Fuji Speedway, Oyama, Japan

Track map of the Fuji Speedway

The 2019 6 Hours of Fuji was an endurance sports car race held on the 6th of October 2019, at the Fuji Speedway. It was the 2nd round of the 2019-20 FIA World Endurance Championship.

The race was won overall by the #8 Toyota Gazoo Racing Toyota TS050 Hybrid, driven by Brendon Hartley, Sébastien Buemi, and Kazuki Nakajima, who had started from pole position. The #8 Toyota won the race in a dominant fashion, taking advantage of the reduced success handicap, compared to the sister #7 car, which had won the season opening round at Silverstone. In the Le Mans Prototype LMP2 class, the race was won by the #29 Oreca 07, run by Racing Team Nederland, and driven by Giedo van der Garde, Frits van Eerd and Nyck de Vries.

In the LMGTE Pro class, the #95 Aston Martin Vantage GTE, run by Aston Martin Racing, and driven by Marco Sørensen and Nicki Thiim emerged victorious, after the duo dominated the second half of the race, to finish 1 lap ahead of the second placed #92 Porsche 911 RSR-19.

In the LMGTE Am class, the #90 Aston Martin Vantage GTE, run by TF Sport, and driven by Jonathan Adam, Charlie Eastwood and Salih Yoluç secured the race victory in a dominant fashion, the pole sitting car holding the lead from start to finish, with the trio managing to maintain a gap exceeding 30 seconds to the 2nd placed car throughout the race.

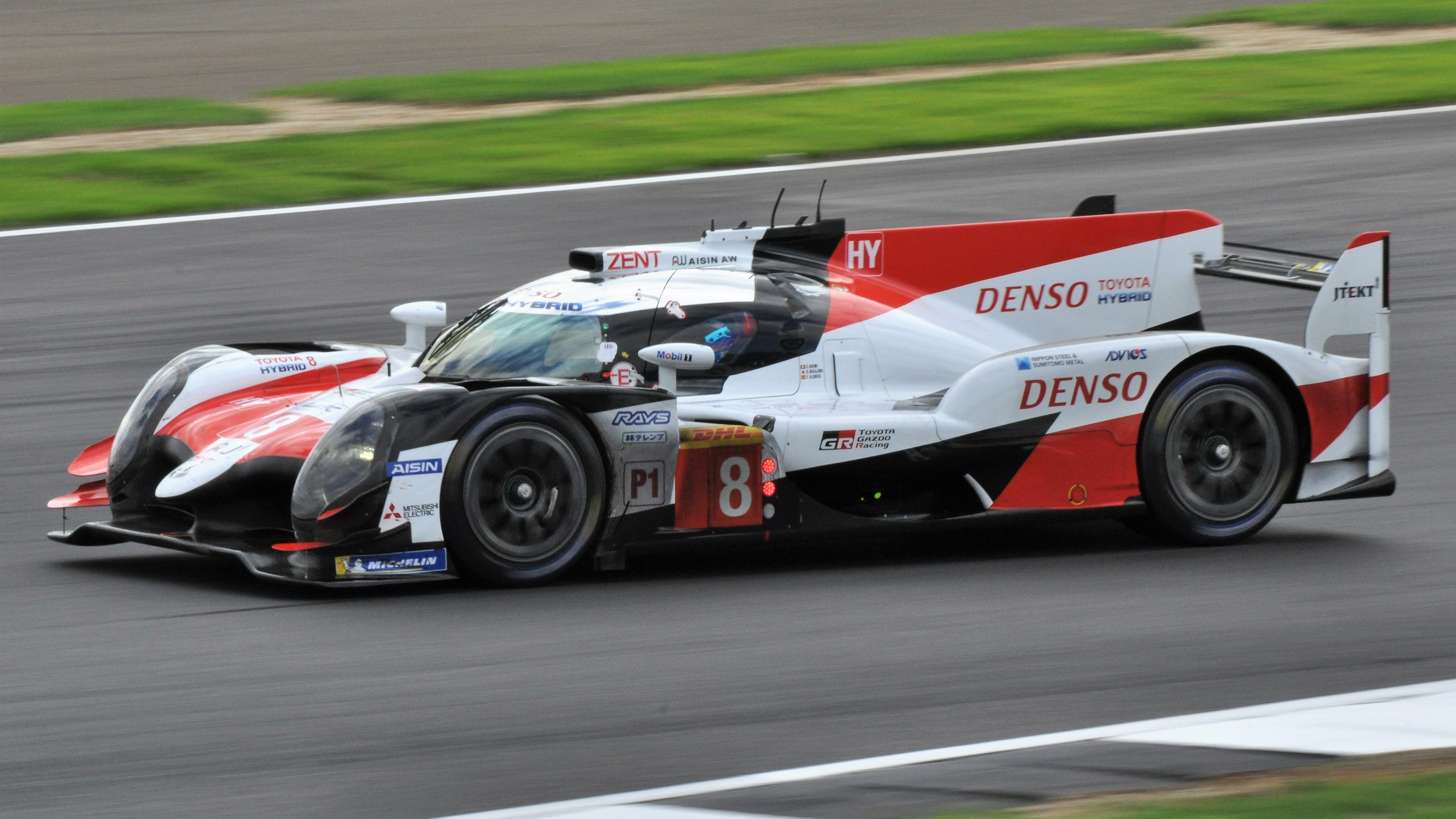
The race winning #8 Toyota TS050 Hybrid, pictured at the 2018 6 Hours of Silverstone

== Entry list ==
A provisional entry list was released on 5 September 2019, with the number of cars entered shrinking from 31 cars to 30 cars, due to the absence of the #3 Rebellion R13 which had been entered on a race-by-race basis, and was not entered for the flyaway rounds.

Anthony Davidson and Alexandre Coigny returned to the championship, after both drivers withdrew from Silverstone due to injuries sustained, while Paul Di Resta will be replaced by Oliver Jarvis in the #22 United Autosports, as a result of Di Resta's DTM commitments with R-Motorsport. David Heinemeier Hansson, who missed Silverstone for the birth of his child, returns to the #56 Team Project 1, having been replaced by David Kolkmann in the No. 56 Porsche the previous round. A final entry list was later released on 19 September 2019.

== Balance of Performance and Success Ballast Changes ==
The success handicap system, which was just introduced to the WEC this season is a way of balancing the top prototype class, following the domination of Toyota the previous season, and operates on a formula based on a coefficient factor of 0.008, which when multiplied by the length of the circuit and the points difference to the last-placed LMP1 car, is used to generate a handicap of seconds per lap.

=== LMP1 ===
The #7 Toyota TS050 Hybrid of Mike Conway, José María López and Kamui Kobayashi, which had emerged victorious at the 4 Hours of Silverstone season-opener would be made 1.4 seconds slower per lap at the 6 Hours of Fuji. The changes to slow down the car include reducing the deployable amount of hybrid power the per lap, and the rate of fuel burn, although its minimum weight of 932 kg will be retained. The sister #8 car will also be slowed down, albeit by 1 second slower per lap, and 9.5 percent more hybrid energy available to it compared to its sister car. The #5 Ginetta G60-LT-P1 finished fourth overall at Silverstone and will therefore be made 0.66 seconds slower per lap, although it would receive the 3rd largest performance hit, due to the absence of the #3 Rebellion R13, which was entered on a race-by-race basis, and had scored 3rd overall. The #5 would receive a weight gain of 34 kg, with the weight increasing from 833 kg to 867 kg. The #1 Rebellion, which finished tenth overall and fourth-best out of the points-scoring LMP1s, will be slowed by 0.03s per lap. Only the #6 Ginetta will be unaffected by any Success handicap, as being the last car to finish in the class, it is used as a reference for the other handicaps.

=== GTE Am ===
All cars in the class now have their base weight reduced by 20 kg, and will have ballast added from the new base weight. The class-winning #83 AF Corse Ferrari 488 GTE Evo of Emmanuel Collard, Francois Perrodo and Niklas Nielsen has earned the largest weight penalty, receiving a total 30 kg worth of ballast, with 15 kg for winning the race and 15 kg for leading the championship. The same rule has also been applied to the GTE Am podium finishers, with the 2nd placed #98 Aston Martin Vantage GTE and #70 MR Racing Ferrari 488 GTE set to run with a total of 20 kg and 10 kg of ballast in Fuji, respectively.

== Qualifying ==
=== Qualifying Report ===
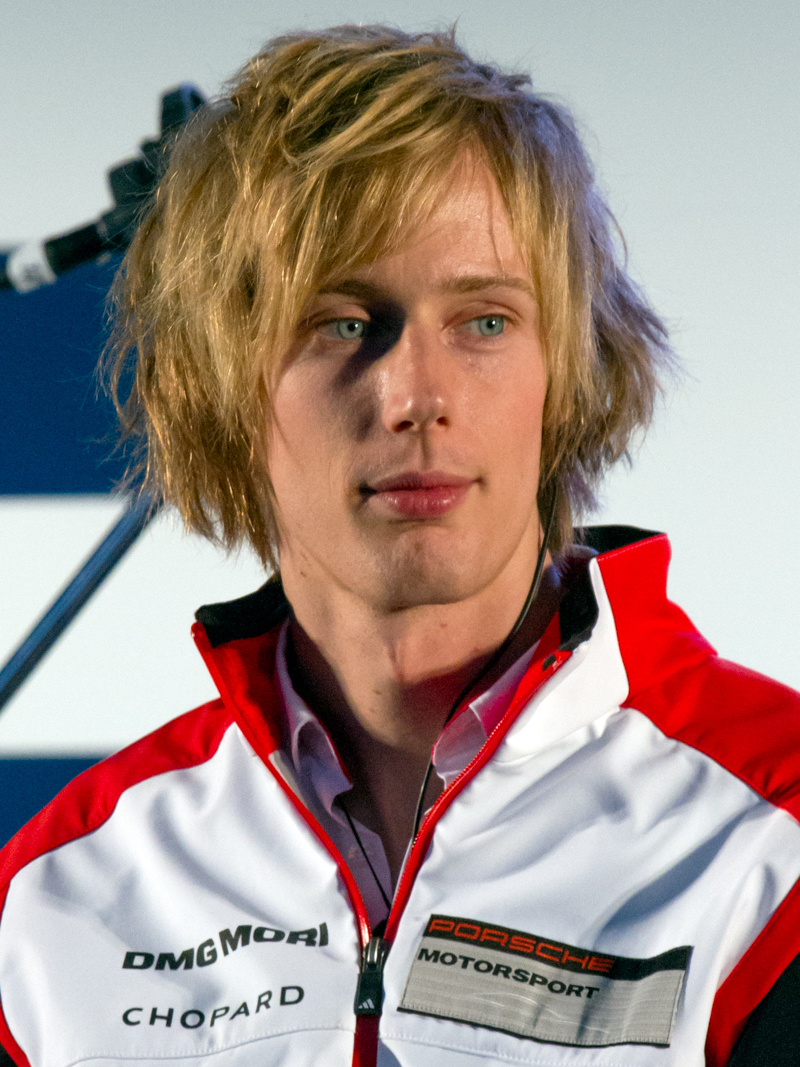
Brendon Hartley (seen here in 2014), secured overall pole position in the #8 Toyota TS050 Hybrid, with his teammate Kazuki Nakajima

As per WEC Regulations, Qualifying on Saturday, held after FP3 was split into 2 different sessions of 20 minutes each, with the first session being held for the LM GTE categories, and the second session being held for the Le Mans Prototype classes. In Qualifying, teams must nominate two drivers from each crew, who must at least set one timed lap in qualifying, with the reference for the starting grid being calculated on the average of the two fastest lap times (one per driver). In an instance where multiple teams set an identical average time, priority is given to the team who set the average earliest.

During the LMP Qualifying Session, in the LMP1 class, the #8 Toyota TS050 Hybrid of Brendon Hartley, and Kazuki Nakajima scored pole position, finishing the session with an average time of 1:25.013, 0.79s clear of the sister #7 car, piloted by Kamui Kobayashi and José María López, with Nakajima beating Lopez by 0.8s in their first runs, while Hartley lapped over seven-tenths quicker than Kobayashi. While Kobayashi had originally been quicker than Hartley, due to a spin by Charlie Robertson, in the #6 Team LNT Ginetta G60-LT-P1, a red flag was brought out towards the end of the session, resulting in Kobayashi's best lap time being deleted. The #6 Ginetta had originally qualified 3rd, due to Simpson's effort, but due to Robertson's spin causing him to be unable to set a lap, the car was shuffled to the back of the LMP1 grid. In 3rd place, and first of the privateer LMP1s, the sole #1 Rebellion R13 set an average time of 1:26.163, with Gustavo Menezes and Norman Nato 1.15 seconds behind the #8 Toyota in the lead. The #5 Ginetta would qualify 4th, with a 1:26:820 average set by Ben Hanley and Egor Orudzhev.

In LMP2, the #37 Jackie Chan DC Racing Oreca would score pole position, its first of the season, and the first-ever WEC pole position for Goodyear with Gabriel Aubry and Ho-Pin Tung setting an average of 1:29.302. Goodyear had looked set to take a front-row lockout, with the sister #38 Jota Sport car of Roberto Gonzalez and Anthony Davidson being in 2nd place during the red flag. However, this 1-2 was disrupted when Filipe Albuquerque set a late lap, bringing the #22 United Autosports car he shared with Philip Hanson to 2nd. In 4th place was the #33 High Class Racing, with Anders Fjordbach being another driver to set a late lap following the Red Flag, bringing the #33 to 4th, ahead of the #42 Cool Racing, and #36 Signatech Alpine ELF Orecas. The sole non-Oreca car, the #47 Dallara P217 entered by Cetilar Racing finished the session last in the LMP2 class, with an average of 1:31.342

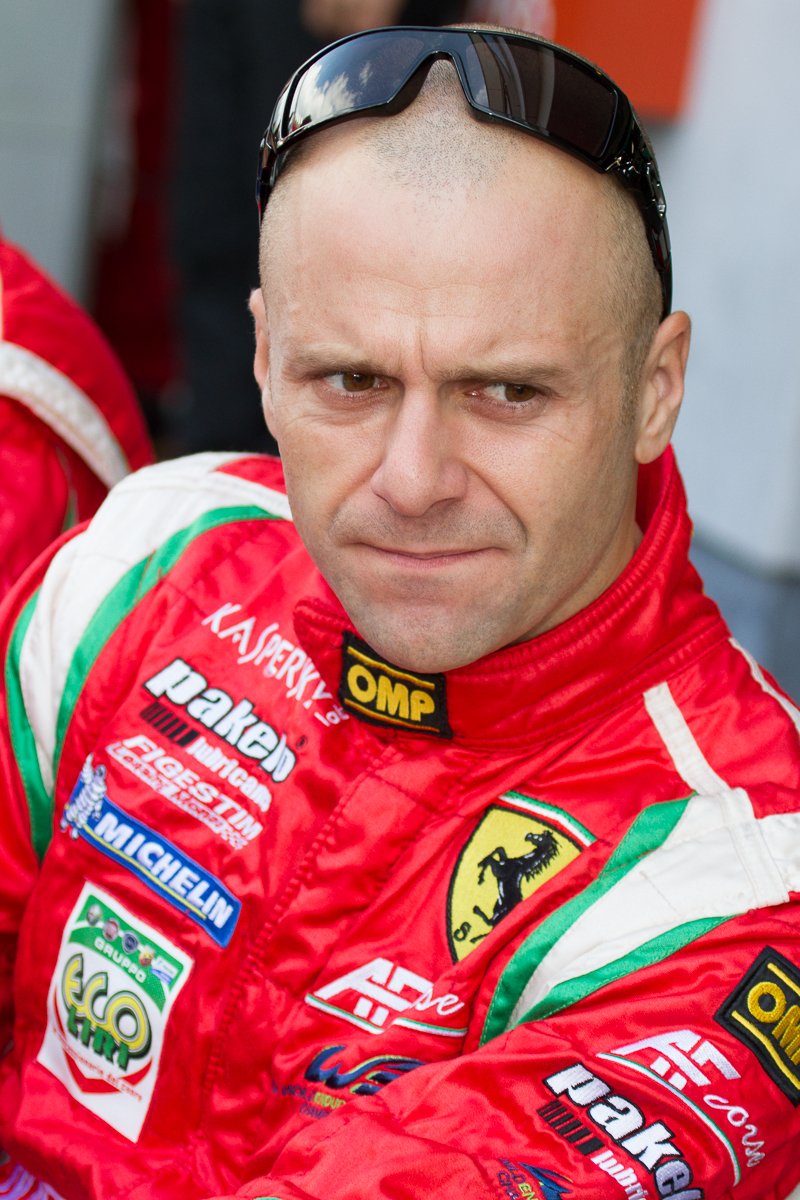
Gianmaria Bruni (seen here in 2012), secured pole position in the LMGTE Pro class, in the #91 Porsche 911 RSR-19, together with teammate Richard Lietz

During the GTE Qualifying Session, the LM GTE Pro class, featured yet another tight qualifying session, with all 6 cars in the class separated by just 0.5 seconds. The pairing of Gianmaria Bruni and Richard Lietz in the #91 Porsche 911 RSR-19 set a 1:37.320 average, to score the first pole position for the car, in what was just its second race. The pair narrowly beat the #51 AF Corse Ferrari 488 GTE Evo of the James Calado and Alessandro Pier Guidi, who trailed the pair by just 0.041 seconds, with an average of 1:37.397. The #95 Aston Martin Vantage AMR GTE of Marco Sørensen and Nicki Thiim set a 1:37.466 to finish in 3rd place, rounding off the top 3.

In the LM GTE Am class, the #90 TF Sport Aston Martin Vantage AMR GTE of Jonny Adam and Salih Yoluc scored pole, with an average of 1:38.821, after the original polesitter, the #57 Team Project 1 of Ben Keating and Felipe Fraga was disqualified from the session. The #57 was disqualified due to an issue with regards to Porsche's door quick release system, which was discovered to not be in compliance with the car's homologation form, during post-qualifying scrutineering, which was later revealed to be a missing fixing screw on one of the side doors. As a result, the car was moved to the back of the grid, and the #83 AF Corse Ferrari 488 GTE Evo, which won the previous race, would start second, with the #98 Aston Martin Racing Aston Martin Vantage AMR GTE in third.

=== Qualifying Result ===
Pole position winners in each class are marked in bold.

Pos	Class	Team	Average Time	Gap	Grid
1	**LMP1**	**No. 8 Toyota Gazoo Racing**	**1:25.013**	−	**1**
2	LMP1	No. 7 Toyota Gazoo Racing	1:25.803	+0.790	2
3	LMP1	No. 1 Rebellion Racing	1:26.163	+1.150	3
4	LMP1	No. 5 Team LNT	1:26.820	+1.807	4
5	**LMP2**	**No. 37 Jackie Chan DC Racing**	**1:29.302**	**+4.289**	**5**
6	LMP2	No. 22 United Autosports	1:29.787	+4.774	6
7	LMP2	No. 38 Jota Sport	1:29.792	+4.779	7
8	LMP2	No. 33 High Class Racing	1:30.073	+5.060	8
9	LMP2	No. 42 Cool Racing	1:30.087	+5.074	9
10	LMP2	No. 36 Signatech Alpine Elf	1:30.858	+5.845	10
11	LMP2	No. 29 Racing Team Nederland	1:30.935	+5.922	11
12	LMP2	No. 47 Cetilar Racing	1:31.342	+6.329	12
13	**LMGTE Pro**	**No. 91 Porsche GT Team**	**1:37.356**	**+12.343**	**13**
14	LMGTE Pro	No. 51 AF Corse	1:37.397	+12.384	14
15	LMGTE Pro	No. 95 Aston Martin Racing	1:37.466	+12.453	15
16	LMGTE Pro	No. 71 AF Corse	1:37.792	+12.779	16
17	LMGTE Pro	No. 97 Aston Martin Racing	1:37.820	+12.807	17
18	LMGTE Pro	No. 92 Porsche GT Team	1:37.935	+12.922	18
19	**LMGTE Am**	**No. 90 TF Sport**	**1:38.821**	**+13.808**	**19**
20	LMGTE Am	No. 83 AF Corse	1:38.850	+13.837	20
21	LMGTE Am	No. 98 Aston Martin Racing	1:38.917	+13.904	21
22	LMGTE Am	No. 56 Team Project 1	1:39.022	+14.009	22
23	LMGTE Am	No. 88 Dempsey-Proton Racing	1:39.025	+14.012	23
24	LMGTE Am	No. 54 AF Corse	1:39.291	+14.278	24
25	LMGTE Am	No. 77 Dempsey-Proton Racing	1:39.549	+14.536	25
26	LMGTE Am	No. 86 Gulf Racing	1:39.610	+14.597	26
27	LMGTE Am	No. 70 MR Racing	1:39.628	+14.615	27
28	LMGTE Am	No. 62 Red River Sport	1:39.889	+14.876	28
29	LMP1	No. 6 Team LNT	1:25.889	−	29
30	LMGTE Am	No. 57 Team Project 1	−	−	30

== Race ==
=== Race Report ===
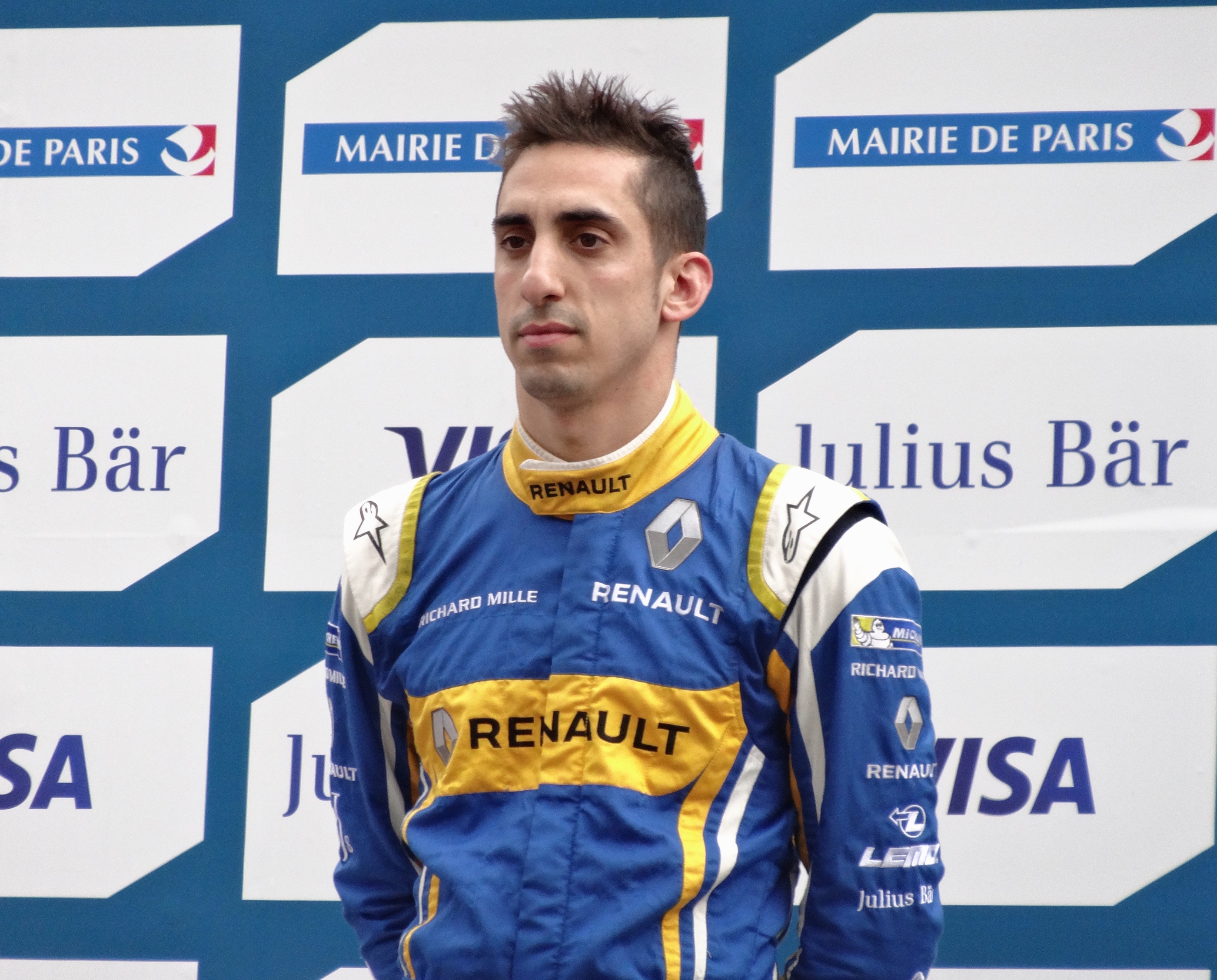
Sébastien Buemi (pictured here in 2014), brought the #8 Toyota TS050 Hybrid across the line, winning the race with Brendon Hartley and Kazuki Nakajima

The first hour of the race saw Toyota Gazoo Racing lead the race with a 1–2, after being split by Rebellion Racing's Bruno Senna early on. Senna had initially led Kamui Kobayashi in the #7 Toyota for the first 20 minutes, after an opportunistic lunge into Turn 3, successfully holding Kobayashi behind, in the Silverstone-winning Toyota, which had been slapped with a 1.4-second success handicap. The battle between the #1 Rebellion and the #7 Toyota saw Kobayashi repeatedly accelerate past Senna heading onto the long main straight at Fuji Speedway, only for the Rebellion to draft past the Toyota with its higher top-end speed, towards the end of the straight. The battle cost both drivers time against the sister #8 Toyota of Sébastien Buemi, who built up a clear advantage in the opening stint, ending hour 1 23 seconds ahead of Kobayashi. The #5 Team LNT Ginetta trailed the duelling pair by 20 seconds, with Egor Orudzhev having made a good start, briefly moving up to second with a sweeping move around Senna and Kobayashi into Turn 1, but eventually lost ground in the following corners to the pair. In LMP2, Giedo van der Garde made a swift charge to put the Racing Team Nederland Oreca 07 Gibson into the class lead, from 7th of the 8 LMP2s on the starting grid, eventually holding a commanding 23 second lead over the 2nd placed High Class Racing car. GTE-Pro saw three changes of the lead in the 1st hour, with pole-sitter Gianmaria Bruni being overtaken by Alessandro Pier Guidi in the #51 Ferrari on lap one, only for Bruni to return to the place once more, diving underneath the Italian into Turn 1 half an hour in, with Marco Sorensen putting the No. 95 Aston Martin Vantage GTE out front later on. Before the first round of pit stops took place, Sorensen led Bruni by less than a second, while Maxime Martin was third in the sister Aston Martin, ahead of Bruni's teammate Kevin Estre and the two AF Corse Ferrari 488 GTE Evos. Salih Yoluc, and the TF Sport Team dominated the opening hour in GTE-Am, with the #90 TF Sport Aston Martin driver working his way into a near half-minute lead. The class triggered a safety car on the first lap, when Satoshi Hoshino careered into the side of the No. 98 Aston Martin Vantage driven by Paul Dalla Lana, at the chicane.

Following the first hour of the race, in LMP1, the Toyotas built a clear lead ahead of the #1 Rebellion, with the #8 Toyota charging ahead of the sister #7 car. In the fourth hour however, the leading #8 car found its lead reduced, after having picked up a drive-through penalty for speeding in the pit lane, with the drive-through leading to its 50-second advantage over the #7, being trimmed to 24 seconds. This however did not affect the result of the race for the #8, with the car crossing the line 34 seconds ahead of the sister #7. Throughout the race, the impact of the new LMP1 success ballast was visible, with the No. 8 constantly posting quicker lap times than the Silverstone winning #7 across the race. This was also seen on the #1 Rebellion during the early stages of the race, with its much smaller handicap from finishing down the order in Silverstone, which Senna had used to get past Kobayashi, before the #1 faded away during the race. completing the podium, albeit two laps adrift of the #8. The 2 Team LNT Ginetta G60-LT-P1s rounded out the LMP1 class order, but finished behind the LMP2 leaders in the overall classification after encountering various issues, with the #5 Ginetta, which finished 16 laps down, making a trip to the garage for repairs after its left-front brake burst on approach to the Turn 1 hairpin. The sister #6 car, meanwhile, would experience a right-rear puncture, before being handed a six-minute stop and hold penalty for a technical infringement in the closing stages of the race.

In LMP2, Racing Team Nederland squad scored its first WEC LMP2 class win with Nyck de Vries, Giedo van der Garde and Frits van Eerd triumphing in a four-way scrap for the win. The LMP2 race saw multiple lead changes between the Michelin shod Oreca 07s of RTN, against the Goodyear shod Oreca 07s of Jackie Chan DC Racing, Jota Sport and High Class Racing. On an alternate strategy, the RTN car took the lead in the final hour, as the Jackie Chan DCR and Jota cars pitted for the final time, with De Vries having an additional stop to make later than his Goodyear-shod rivals, but the recently crowned FIA Formula 2 champion, and the pit crew of RTN performed it quickly, to maintain a six-second gap to Anthony Davidson in the No. 38 Jota Sport car. The 24-year-old then built up a lead of 25 seconds from Davidson, who shared the #38 Jota Sport with Antonio Felix da Costa and Roberto Gonzalez. Jackie Chan DC Racing's Oreca, also run by the Jota Sport operation, finished third in the hands of Will Stevens, Gabriel Aubry and Ho-Pin Tung. The #37 car had led going into the final hour, but Tung was overtaken by Davidson in the pits. Tung had set the Jackie Chan car into the lead, following well-executed move on High Class Racing's Mark Patterson, who had taken over from Kenta Yamashita. The High Class Racing trio of Patterson, Yamashita and Anders Fjordbach finished fourth, ahead of the No. 22 Oreca of United Autosports. The High Class Racing Oreca had led on various occasions during the race, including the fifth hour when Yamashita out-braked Tung into Turn 1, but the order would become reversed after Yamashita handed over the car over to Patterson at the final driver swap.

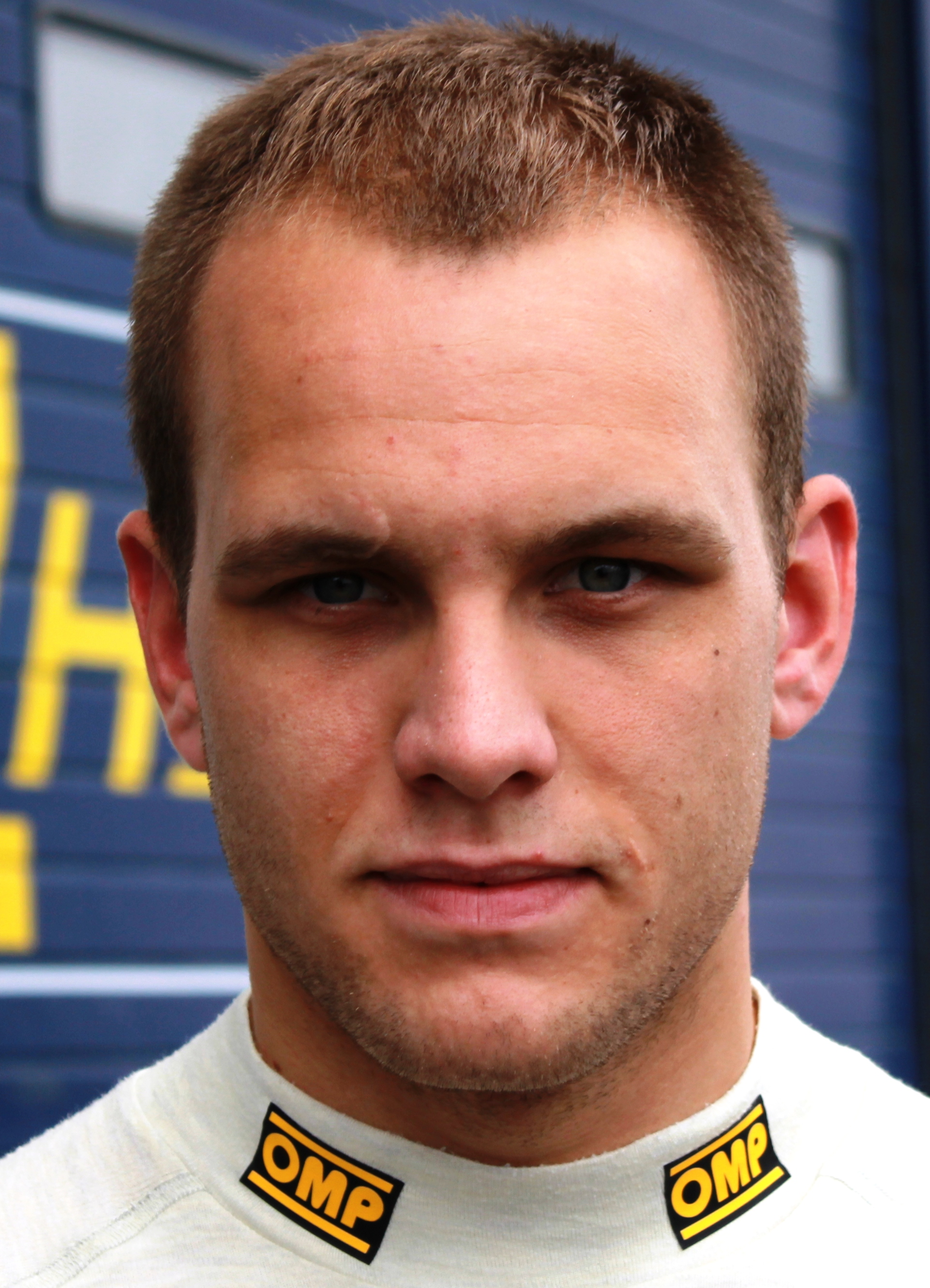
Marco Sørensen (seen here in 2014) brought the #95 Aston Martin Vantage GTE across the finish, winning the LMGTE Pro race with Nicki Thiim

In the LM GTE classes, the Aston Martin Vantage AMR GTE would finish on the top step of the podium, in the hands of Marco Sørensen and Nicki Thiim for Aston Martin Racing in the GTE-Pro class, whilst Salih Yoluc, Charlie Eastwood and Jonny Adam brought home to TF Sport its inaugural WEC Race win with the 2nd Generation Vantage GTE in GTE-Am. In GTE-Pro, the #95 Aston Martin Vantage GTE would secure its first win since the previous year's 6 Hours of Shanghai, after a controlling second-half display, which followed what had been a busy start to the second round of the championship. Thiim had brought the car to the head of the pack, with a clean dive on his teammate Alex Lynn in the #97 while entering the chicane in the second hour, in what would be the race-deciding move. The #97 duo went on to control the GTE-Pro race, leading throughout the course of two Full Course Yellow periods in the fourth hour to take the win, nearly a full 18 seconds ahead of the 2nd placed #92 Porsche 911 RSR-19 of Kevin Estre and Michael Christensen, while the sister #97 car finished third.

The Aston Martins had been running 1–2 in the middle portion of the race, until Maxime Martin had a wild moment in the braking zone at Turn 1, with his evasive action through the gravel runoff costing him a full 20 seconds to Sorensen, which enabled the #92 Porsche to close in, with Estre then getting ahead shortly, by pitting fully under the first Full Course Yellow, while the #97 Aston Martin didn't pit under the full duration of the intervention. Upon exiting the pits, Christensen maintained a gap that hovered around 20 seconds until the end of the race.

The AF Corse Ferraris struggled throughout the race, despite initially posing a challenge for the lead in the early stages, as Alessandro Pier Guidi in the #51 snatched the lead on the opening lap from the pole-sitting #91 Porsche. However, the two AF Corse-run Ferrari 488 GTE Evos fell back significantly after that, with Pier Guidi being passed by both the Porsches and Aston Martins, while the sister #71 spent majority of the race at the back of the class. The 2017 GT World Champions, Pier Guidi and Calado ended up finishing fourth, one place ahead of their AF Corse teammates, Davide Rigon and Miguel Molina, with the Ferraris having only gotten ahead of the pole-sitting No. 91 Porsche at the finish, due to the #91 serving a drive-through penalty caused by excessive track limits abuse.

TF Sport dominated the GTE-Am race from pole, with the trio of Salih Yoluç, Charlie Eastwood and Jonathan Adam taking the win, after TF Sport was handed pole in the wake of a penalty for the #57 Team Project 1 Porsche. The trio built up a massive lead up front, and were virtually untouchable throughout the race, with Yoluc establishing a large gap in the first stint. Eastwood and Adam consolidated the Yoluc's advantage over the next few stints, with the TF Sport car often being 50 seconds clear of second place. Adam would take the checkered flag 33 seconds ahead of second placed Nicklas Nielsen, who had closed the gap slightly in the final hour in the #83 AF Corse Ferrari. Nielsen shared the Silverstone-winning Ferrari with Emmanuel Collard and Francois Perrodo, the trio finishing ahead of the #57 Project 1 car that started from the back of the grid after its post-qualifying penalty. Ben Keating worked his way through the pack in the opening stages, with the American driver passing the #77 of Christian Ried for third within the first 30 minutes of the race. Jeroen Bleekemolen then promoted the #57 to second with a move on Perrodo into the chicane in hour three, but the positions were later swapped, when Nielsen overtook Felipe Fraga at the end of the fourth hour, with the cars remaining in 2nd and 3rd till the end of the race.

=== Race Result ===
The minimum number of laps for classification (70% of the overall winning car's race distance) was 162 laps. Class winners in bold.

Pos	Class	No	Team	Drivers	Chassis	Tyre	Laps	Time/Retired
Pos	Class	No	Team	Drivers	Engine	Tyre	Laps	Time/Retired
1	**LMP1**	**8**	**(Japan) Toyota Gazoo Racing**	**(Switzerland) Sébastien Buemi (Japan) Kazuki Nakajima (New Zealand) Brendon Hartley**	**Toyota TS050 Hybrid**	M	**232**	**6:00:30.025**
1	**LMP1**	**8**	**(Japan) Toyota Gazoo Racing**	**(Switzerland) Sébastien Buemi (Japan) Kazuki Nakajima (New Zealand) Brendon Hartley**	**Toyota 2.4L Turbo V6**	M	**232**	**6:00:30.025**
2	LMP1	7	(Japan) Toyota Gazoo Racing	(United Kingdom) Mike Conway (Japan) Kamui Kobayashi (Argentina) José María López	Toyota TS050 Hybrid	M	232	+33.955
2	LMP1	7	(Japan) Toyota Gazoo Racing	(United Kingdom) Mike Conway (Japan) Kamui Kobayashi (Argentina) José María López	Toyota 2.4L Turbo V6	M	232	+33.955
3	LMP1	1	(Switzerland) Rebellion Racing	(Brazil) Bruno Senna (United States) Gustavo Menezes (France) Norman Nato	Rebellion R13	M	230	+2 laps
3	LMP1	1	(Switzerland) Rebellion Racing	(Brazil) Bruno Senna (United States) Gustavo Menezes (France) Norman Nato	Gibson GL458 4.5 L V8	M	230	+2 laps
4	**LMP2**	**29**	**(Netherlands) Racing Team Nederland**	**(Netherlands) Giedo van der Garde** **(Netherlands) Frits van Eerd** **(Netherlands) Nyck de Vries**	**Oreca 07**	M	**222**	**+10 laps**
4	**LMP2**	**29**	**(Netherlands) Racing Team Nederland**	**(Netherlands) Giedo van der Garde** **(Netherlands) Frits van Eerd** **(Netherlands) Nyck de Vries**	**Gibson GK428 4.2 L V8**	M	**222**	**+10 laps**
5	LMP2	37	(China) Jackie Chan DC Racing	(China) Ho-Pin Tung (France) Gabriel Aubry (United Kingdom) Will Stevens	Oreca 07	G	221	+11 laps
5	LMP2	37	(China) Jackie Chan DC Racing	(China) Ho-Pin Tung (France) Gabriel Aubry (United Kingdom) Will Stevens	Gibson GK428 4.2 L V8	G	221	+11 laps
6	LMP2	22	(United Kingdom) United Autosports	(Portugal) Filipe Albuquerque (United Kingdom) Philip Hanson (United Kingdom) Paul di Resta	Oreca 07	M	220	+12 laps
6	LMP2	22	(United Kingdom) United Autosports	(Portugal) Filipe Albuquerque (United Kingdom) Philip Hanson (United Kingdom) Paul di Resta	Gibson GK428 4.2 L V8	M	220	+12 laps
7	LMP2	33	(Denmark) High Class Racing	(Denmark) Anders Fjordbach (United States) Mark Patterson (Japan) Kenta Yamashita	Oreca 07	G	219	+13 laps
7	LMP2	33	(Denmark) High Class Racing	(Denmark) Anders Fjordbach (United States) Mark Patterson (Japan) Kenta Yamashita	Gibson GK428 4.2 L V8	G	219	+13 laps
8	LMP2	42	(Switzerland) Cool Racing	(Switzerland) Antonin Borga (Switzerland) Alexander Coigny (France) Nicolas Lapierre	Oreca 07	M	219	+13 laps
8	LMP2	42	(Switzerland) Cool Racing	(Switzerland) Antonin Borga (Switzerland) Alexander Coigny (France) Nicolas Lapierre	Gibson GK428 4.2 L V8	M	219	+13 laps
9	LMP1	6	(United Kingdom) Team LNT	(United Kingdom) Charlie Robertson (United Kingdom) Michael Simpson (United Kingdom) Guy Smith	Ginetta G60-LT-P1	M	218	+14 laps
9	LMP1	6	(United Kingdom) Team LNT	(United Kingdom) Charlie Robertson (United Kingdom) Michael Simpson (United Kingdom) Guy Smith	AER P60C 2.4 L Turbo V6	M	218	+14 laps
10	LMP2	36	(France) Signatech Alpine Elf	(France) Thomas Laurent (Brazil) André Negrão (France) Pierre Ragues	Oreca 07	M	217	+15 laps
10	LMP2	36	(France) Signatech Alpine Elf	(France) Thomas Laurent (Brazil) André Negrão (France) Pierre Ragues	Gibson GK428 4.2 L V8	M	217	+15 laps
11	LMP1	5	(United Kingdom) Team LNT	(Italy) Luca Ghiotto (United Kingdom) Ben Hanley (Russia) Egor Orudzhev	Ginetta G60-LT-P1	M	216	+16 laps
11	LMP1	5	(United Kingdom) Team LNT	(Italy) Luca Ghiotto (United Kingdom) Ben Hanley (Russia) Egor Orudzhev	AER P60C 2.4 L Turbo V6	M	216	+16 laps
12	LMP2	47	(Italy) Cetilar Racing	(Italy) Andrea Belicchi (Italy) Roberto Lacorte (Italy) Giorgio Sernagiotto	Dallara P217	M	216	+16 laps
12	LMP2	47	(Italy) Cetilar Racing	(Italy) Andrea Belicchi (Italy) Roberto Lacorte (Italy) Giorgio Sernagiotto	Gibson GK428 4.2 L V8	M	216	+16 laps
13	**LMGTE Pro**	**95**	**(United Kingdom) Aston Martin Racing**	**(Denmark) Marco Sørensen** **(Denmark) Nicki Thiim**	**Aston Martin Vantage AMR GTE**	M	**211**	**+21 laps**
13	**LMGTE Pro**	**95**	**(United Kingdom) Aston Martin Racing**	**(Denmark) Marco Sørensen** **(Denmark) Nicki Thiim**	**Aston Martin 4.0L Turbo V8**	M	**211**	**+21 laps**
14	LMGTE Pro	92	(Germany) Porsche GT Team	(Denmark) Michael Christensen (France) Kévin Estre	Porsche 911 RSR-19	M	210	+22 laps
14	LMGTE Pro	92	(Germany) Porsche GT Team	(Denmark) Michael Christensen (France) Kévin Estre	Porsche 4.2L Flat-Six	M	210	+22 laps
15	LMGTE Pro	97	(United Kingdom) Aston Martin Racing	(United Kingdom) Alex Lynn (Belgium) Maxime Martin	Aston Martin Vantage AMR GTE	M	210	+22 laps
15	LMGTE Pro	97	(United Kingdom) Aston Martin Racing	(United Kingdom) Alex Lynn (Belgium) Maxime Martin	Aston Martin 4.0L Turbo V8	M	210	+22 laps
16	LMGTE Pro	51	(Italy) AF Corse	(United Kingdom) James Calado (Italy) Alessandro Pier Guidi	Ferrari 488 GTE EVO	M	210	+22 laps
16	LMGTE Pro	51	(Italy) AF Corse	(United Kingdom) James Calado (Italy) Alessandro Pier Guidi	Ferrari F154CB 4.0L Turbo V8	M	210	+22 laps
17	LMGTE Pro	71	(Italy) AF Corse	(Italy) Davide Rigon (Spain) Miguel Molina	Ferrari 488 GTE EVO	M	209	+23 laps
17	LMGTE Pro	71	(Italy) AF Corse	(Italy) Davide Rigon (Spain) Miguel Molina	Ferrari F154CB 4.0L Turbo V8	M	209	+23 laps
18	LMGTE Pro	91	(Germany) Porsche GT Team	(Italy) Gianmaria Bruni (Austria) Richard Lietz	Porsche 911 RSR-19	M	208	+24 laps
18	LMGTE Pro	91	(Germany) Porsche GT Team	(Italy) Gianmaria Bruni (Austria) Richard Lietz	Porsche 4.2L Flat-Six	M	208	+24 laps
19	**LMGTE Am**	**90**	**(United Kingdom) TF Sport**	**(United Kingdom) Jonathan Adam** **(Republic of Ireland) Charlie Eastwood** **(Turkey) Salih Yoluç**	**Aston Martin Vantage AMR GTE**	M	**208**	**+24 laps**
19	**LMGTE Am**	**90**	**(United Kingdom) TF Sport**	**(United Kingdom) Jonathan Adam** **(Republic of Ireland) Charlie Eastwood** **(Turkey) Salih Yoluç**	**Aston Martin 4.0L Turbo V8**	M	**208**	**+24 laps**
20	LMGTE Am	83	(Italy) AF Corse	(France) Emmanuel Collard (Denmark) Nicklas Nielsen (France) François Perrodo	Ferrari 488 GTE EVO	M	207	+25 laps
20	LMGTE Am	83	(Italy) AF Corse	(France) Emmanuel Collard (Denmark) Nicklas Nielsen (France) François Perrodo	Ferrari F154CB 4.0L Turbo V8	M	207	+25 laps
21	LMGTE Am	57	(Germany) Team Project 1	(Netherlands) Jeroen Bleekemolen (Brazil) Felipe Fraga (United States) Ben Keating	Porsche 911 RSR	M	207	+25 laps
21	LMGTE Am	57	(Germany) Team Project 1	(Netherlands) Jeroen Bleekemolen (Brazil) Felipe Fraga (United States) Ben Keating	Porsche 4.0L Flat 6	M	207	+25 laps
22	LMGTE Am	70	(Japan) MR Racing	(Monaco) Olivier Beretta (Japan) Kei Cozzolino (Japan) Motoaki Ishikawa	Ferrari 488 GTE EVO	M	207	+25 laps
22	LMGTE Am	70	(Japan) MR Racing	(Monaco) Olivier Beretta (Japan) Kei Cozzolino (Japan) Motoaki Ishikawa	Ferrari F154CB 4.0L Turbo V8	M	207	+25 laps
23	LMGTE Am	77	(Germany) Dempsey-Proton Racing	(Australia) Matt Campbell (Italy) Riccardo Pera (Germany) Christian Ried	Porsche 911 RSR	M	207	+25 laps
23	LMGTE Am	77	(Germany) Dempsey-Proton Racing	(Australia) Matt Campbell (Italy) Riccardo Pera (Germany) Christian Ried	Porsche 4.0L Flat 6	M	207	+25 laps
24	LMGTE Am	54	(Italy) AF Corse	(Italy) Francesco Castellacci (Italy) Giancarlo Fisichella (Switzerland) Thomas Flohr	Ferrari 488 GTE EVO	M	206	+26 laps
24	LMGTE Am	54	(Italy) AF Corse	(Italy) Francesco Castellacci (Italy) Giancarlo Fisichella (Switzerland) Thomas Flohr	Ferrari F154CB 4.0L Turbo V8	M	206	+26 laps
25	LMGTE Am	56	(Germany) Team Project 1	(Italy) Matteo Cairoli (Denmark) David Heinemeier Hansson (Norway) Egidio Perfetti	Porsche 911 RSR	M	206	+26 laps
25	LMGTE Am	56	(Germany) Team Project 1	(Italy) Matteo Cairoli (Denmark) David Heinemeier Hansson (Norway) Egidio Perfetti	Porsche 4.0L Flat 6	M	206	+26 laps
26	LMGTE Am	86	(United Kingdom) Gulf Racing	(United Kingdom) Ben Barker (United Kingdom) Michael Wainwright (United Kingdom) Andrew Watson	Porsche 911 RSR	M	204	+28 laps
26	LMGTE Am	86	(United Kingdom) Gulf Racing	(United Kingdom) Ben Barker (United Kingdom) Michael Wainwright (United Kingdom) Andrew Watson	Porsche 4.0L Flat 6	M	204	+28 laps
27	LMGTE Am	88	(Germany) Dempsey-Proton Racing	(Austria) Thomas Preining (Japan) Satoshi Hoshino (Belgium) Adrien de Leener	Porsche 911 RSR	M	198	+34 laps
27	LMGTE Am	88	(Germany) Dempsey-Proton Racing	(Austria) Thomas Preining (Japan) Satoshi Hoshino (Belgium) Adrien de Leener	Porsche 4.0L Flat 6	M	198	+34 laps
28	LMGTE Am	62	(United Kingdom) Red River Sport	(United Kingdom) Bonamy Grimes (United Kingdom) Charles Hollings (United Kingdom) Johnny Mowlem	Ferrari 488 GTE EVO	M	197	+35 laps
28	LMGTE Am	62	(United Kingdom) Red River Sport	(United Kingdom) Bonamy Grimes (United Kingdom) Charles Hollings (United Kingdom) Johnny Mowlem	Ferrari F154CB 4.0L Turbo V8	M	197	+35 laps
29	LMGTE Am	98	(United Kingdom) Aston Martin Racing	(Canada) Paul Dalla Lana (United Kingdom) Darren Turner (United Kingdom) Ross Gunn	Aston Martin Vantage AMR GTE	M	186	+46 laps
29	LMGTE Am	98	(United Kingdom) Aston Martin Racing	(Canada) Paul Dalla Lana (United Kingdom) Darren Turner (United Kingdom) Ross Gunn	Aston Martin 4.0L Turbo V8	M	186	+46 laps
DSQ	LMP2	38	(United Kingdom) Jota Sport	(Portugal) António Félix da Costa (Mexico) Roberto González (United Kingdom) Anthony Davidson	Oreca 07	G	222	Disqualified (Note: The No. 38 Jota Sport LMP2 was disqualified for its outside neutral switch being unable to disconnect the transmission.)
DSQ	LMP2	38	(United Kingdom) Jota Sport	(Portugal) António Félix da Costa (Mexico) Roberto González (United Kingdom) Anthony Davidson	Gibson GK428 4.2 L V8	G	222	Disqualified
