= Nick Yelloly =

British racing driver (born 1990)

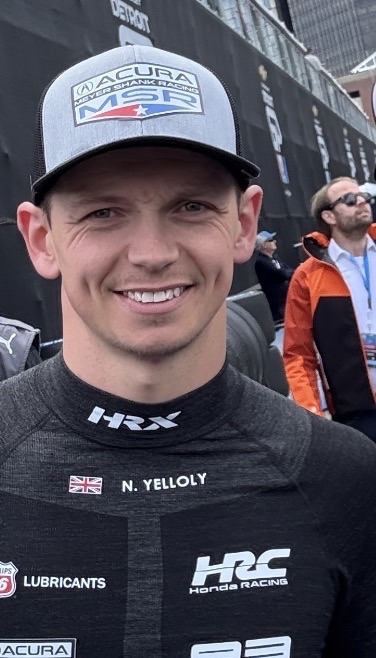
- Nick Yelloly at 2025 Chevrolet Detroit Sports Car Classic
- Nationality: (United Kingdom) British
- Born: Nicholas Jon Yelloly; 3 December 1990 (age 35) Stafford, Staffordshire, England

IMSA SportsCar Championship career
- Debut season: 2020
- Current team: Meyer Shank Racing w/ Curb-Agajanian
- Categorisation: FIA Silver (2015); FIA Gold (2016–2022); FIA Platinum (2023–)
- Car number: 93
- Former teams: BMW Team M RLL
- Starts: 39 (39 entries)
- Wins: 3
- Podiums: 11
- Poles: 6
- Fastest laps: 3
- Best finish: 5th in 2025

European Le Mans Series career
- Debut season: 2024
- Current team: Inter Europol Competition
- Car number: 43
- Former teams: Nielsen Racing
- Starts: 9
- Wins: 0
- Podiums: 6
- Poles: 1
- Fastest laps: 1
- Best finish: 2nd in 2024-2025 (LMP2)

24 Hours of Le Mans career
- Years: 2025
- Teams: Inter Europol Competition
- Best finish: 1st (2025)
- Class wins: 1 (2025)

Previous series
- 2020-2024 2020-2021 2019 2018 2018 2016-2017 2015 2011-13, 15 2010 2009–2010 2008–09: GTWC Europe Endurance Cup; ADAC GT Masters; China GT Championship; Blancpain GT Series Endurance; Porsche Supercup; Porsche Carrera Cup Germany; GP2 Series; Formula Renault 3.5 Series; Eurocup Formula Renault 2.0; Formula Renault 2.0 Britain; FRUK Winter Series

Championship titles
- 2019: China GT Championship

Nicholas Jon Yelloly (born 3 December 1990) is a British racing driver who will compete in the FIA World Endurance Championship for Ford Racing as a factory driver. He also competes for Inter Europol Competition in the LMP2 class of the IMSA SportsCar Championship and Asian Le Mans Series.

Yelloly is also a test and simulator driver for the Aston Martin team in Formula One.

== Early career ==
=== Karting ===
Yelloly made his karting début in September 2005. After competing in Junior TKM Intermediate in 2006, Yelloly moved up to ICA in 2007, finishing 15th. Yelloly moved into the Super 1 National KF1 Championship in 2008, and finished in eighth position in the championship.

=== Formula Renault UK ===
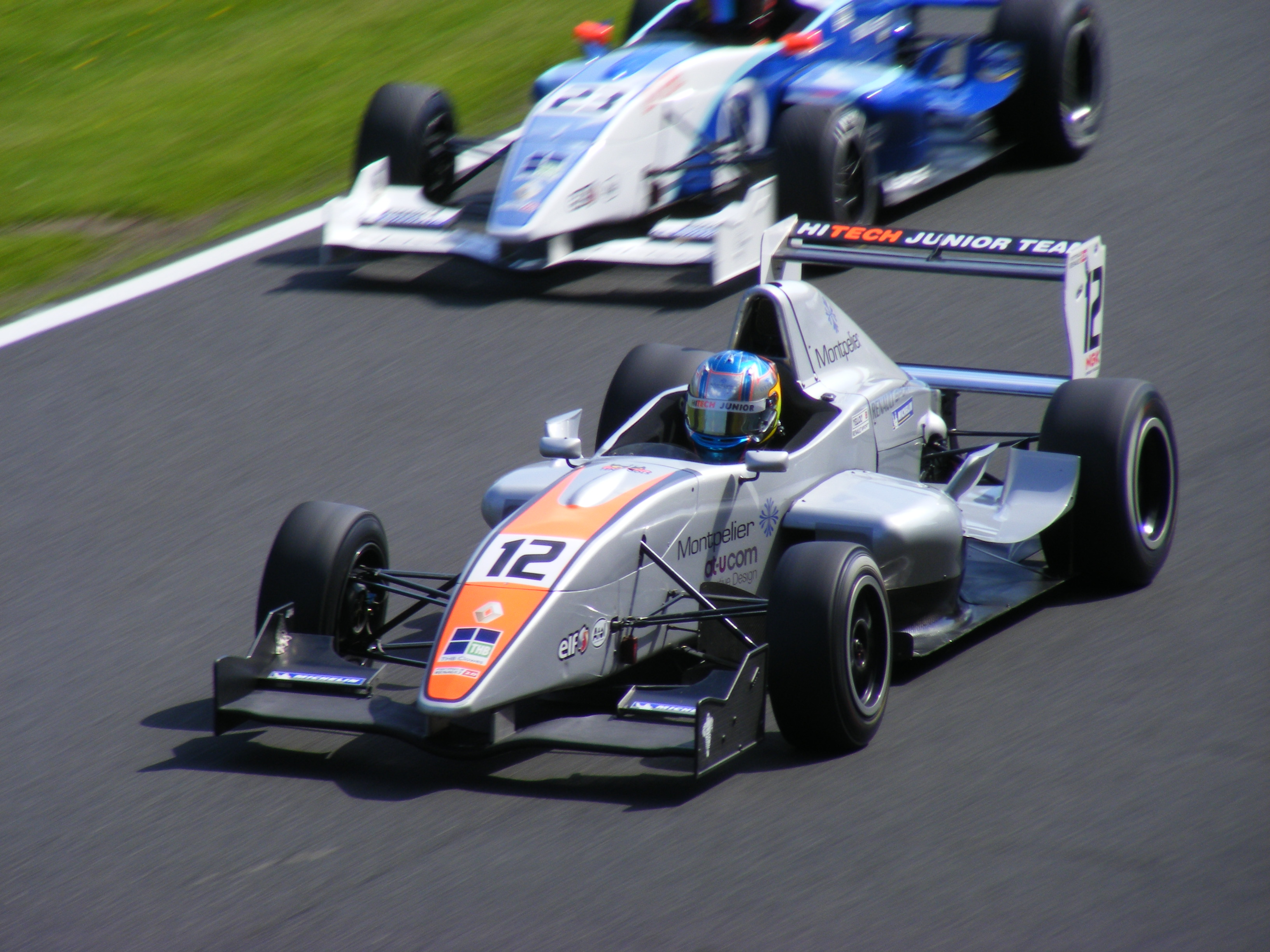
Yelloly during qualifying at Oulton Park during the 2009 Formula Renault UK season.

Yelloly moved into the Formula Renault UK Winter Series in 2008 and finished fourteenth with points-scoring finishes in each of the four races with Fortec Competition. In 2009, Yelloly switched to the Hitech Junior Team, to contest a full season of Formula Renault UK. He had twelve point-scoring finishes on his way to nineteenth place in the championship and seventh in the Graduate Cup.

Yelloly remained in the series with the newly renamed Atech Grand Prix team. He improved to seventh place in the championship, with three podiums and a win at season finale in Brands Hatch.

=== GP3 Series ===
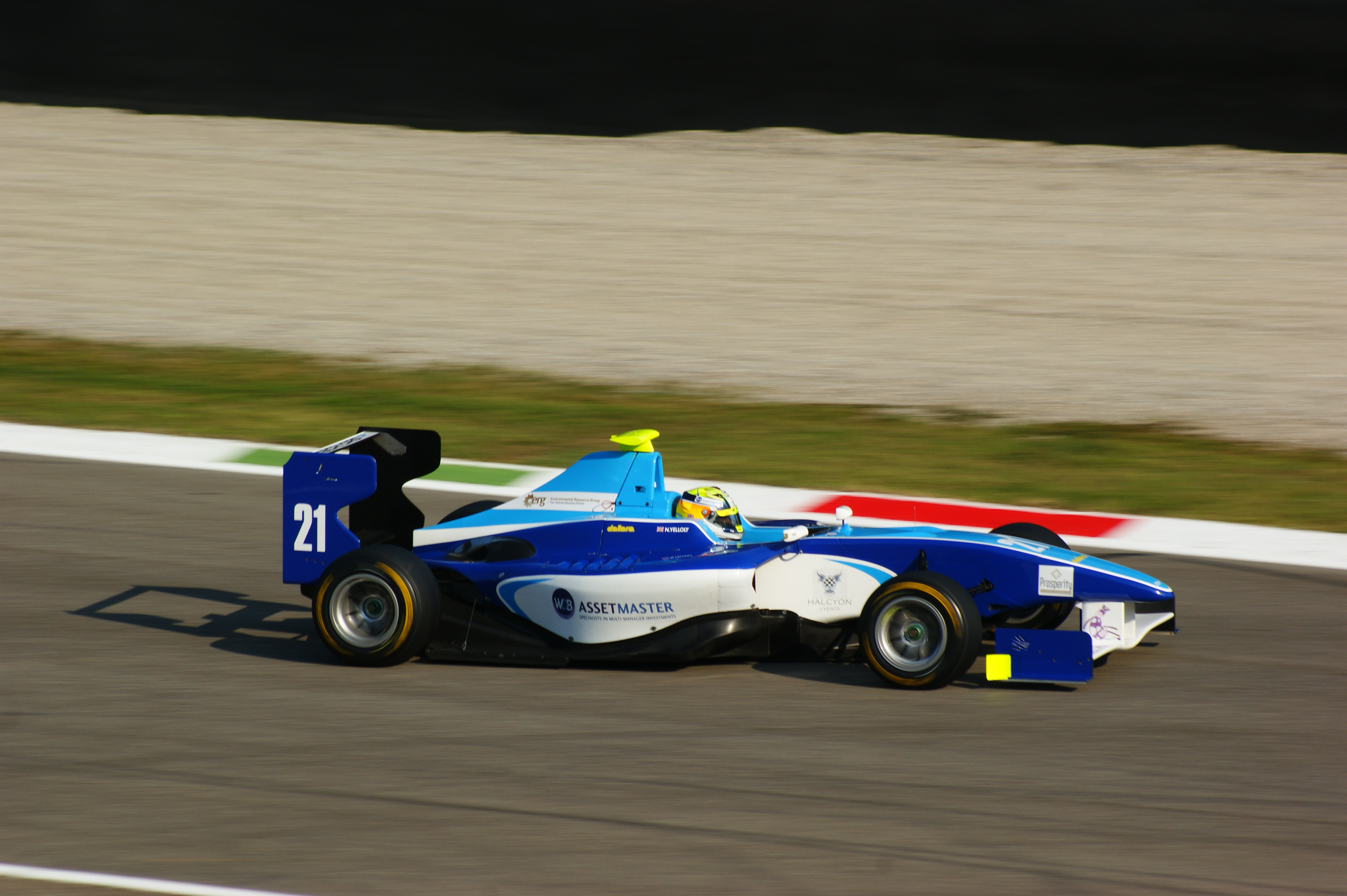
Yelloly at Monza during the 2011 GP3 Series.

Yelloly continued his partnership with Atech CRS Grand Prix in 2011, stepping up to the GP3 Series alongside Marlon Stöckinger and Zoël Amberg. In a difficult season for the team, Yelloly finished 21st in the championship with seven points, courtesy of a strong showing at his home championship round held at Silverstone, but failing to score any points elsewhere. He was still the best-placed Atech CRS driver, as neither Stöckinger or Amberg registered a points finish all season.

=== Formula Renault 3.5 ===
Yelloly made his Formula Renault 3.5 Series début at Silverstone for round seven of nine in the 2011 championship, driving for Pons Racing alongside Oliver Webb. After a difficult start, in which he was disqualified from his first race, he went on to secure three points finishes, including a podium in the final race at the Catalunya.

Yelloly signed for Comtec Racing for the 2012 season. He won the first race on the series calendar at Aragón, and picked up a second race win at the Nürburgring. He finished the season in fifth place overall, taking two further podium finishes at Spa-Francorchamps and Paul Ricard.

=== Return to GP3 ===
In February 2013, Yelloly announced that he would return to the GP3 Series, racing for Carlin Motorsport for the upcoming season and finishing sixth overall, having scored four podiums. In 2014, he switched to Status Grand Prix. Though he finished second in the sprint race at the Yas Marina Circuit, Yelloly converted it into his first race win after race winner Patric Niederhauser was excluded from the results due to a breach in technical regulations, which elevated the Briton to sixth in the standings.

== Sportscar career (2016–22) ==
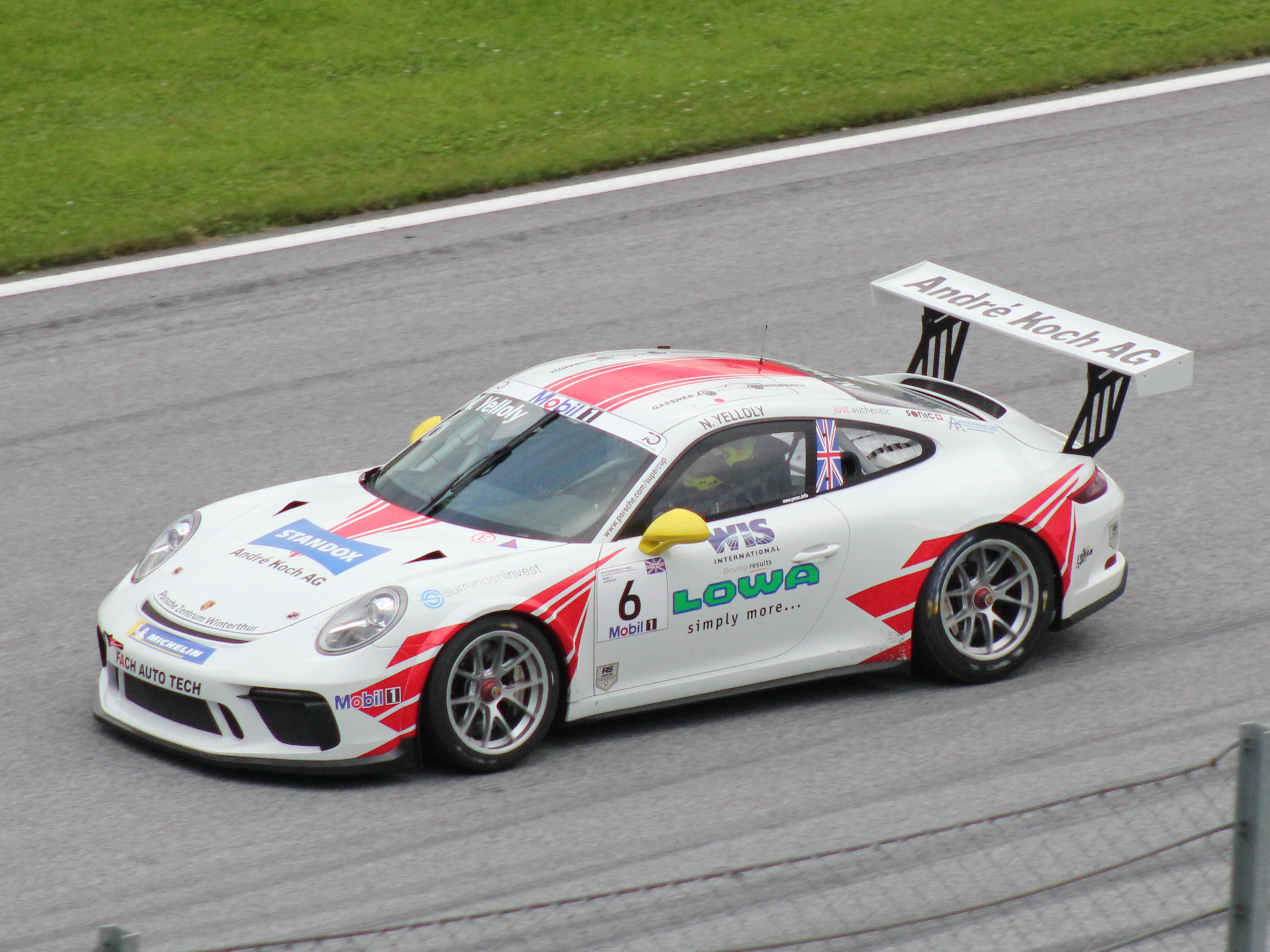
Yelloly driving at the Red Bull Ring during the 2018 Porsche Supercup season. He finished the season in second place.

=== Porsche Cup racing ===
In 2016, Yelloly made a switch to the Porsche Carrera Cup Germany series with the Project 1 Motorsport team, finishing the year as vice-champion of the rookie class and sixth place in the overall championship. He would also take part in the British Grand Prix supporting Porsche Supercup race at Silverstone.

For 2017, Yelloly returned to the series with the same team, this time winning three races and ending the year as runner-up along with two appearances in the Porsche Supercup.

After showing good pace in the national series, Yelloly would make the full time move in to the Porsche Supercup for 2018 with the Fach Auto Tech team. A season long battle with Michael Ammermüller and Thomas Preining saw the Brit take second in the championship, having secured wins at the support races for the Monaco and German Grand Prix.

=== BMW Motorsport works driver ===
==== Chinese GT ====
On 24 February 2019, BMW announced that Yelloly would be joining them as a works driver, taking part in his first race for the manufacturer in the China GT Championship in March. Driving for Fist Team AAI, Yelloly took home five victories from ten races, thus earning himself the Chinese GT title.

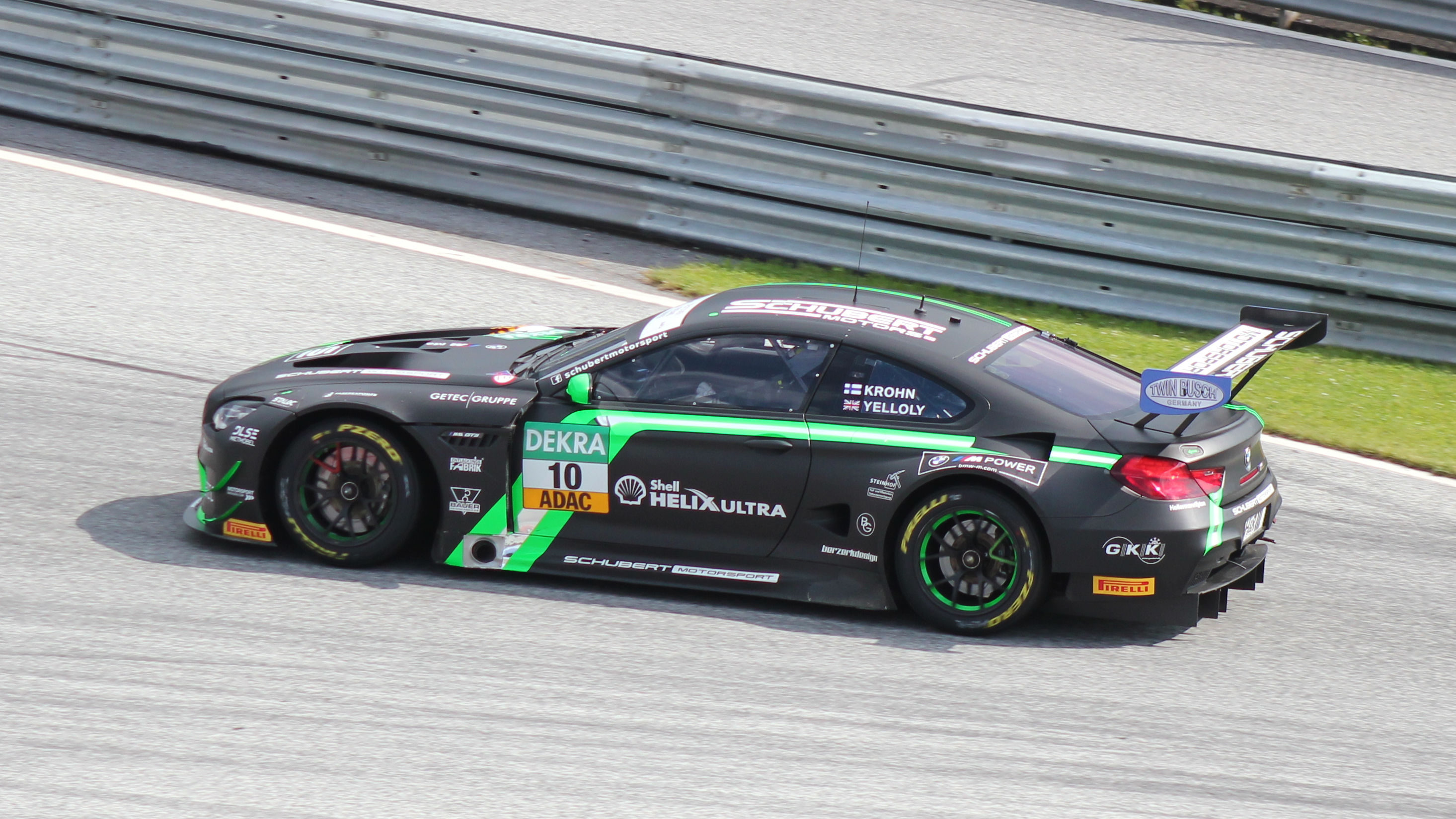
Yelloly competing at the Red Bull Ring during the 2021 ADAC GT Masters season.

==== ADAC GT Masters ====
In 2020, Yelloly teamed up with Schubert Motorsport to drive alongside Henric Skoog for the majority of the ADAC GT Masters season. He finished 22nd in the standings with a lone victory at the Red Bull Ring, having missed two rounds during the campaign. During the year, Yelloly also won the 24 Hours of Nürburgring alongside Nicky Catsburg and Alexander Sims.

Yelloly returned to the championship for the 2021 season, partnering Jesse Krohn in a Schubert-Motorsport-run BMW M6 GT3. With three podiums, including a second place during the season opener in Oschersleben, the pairing of Yelloly and Krohn ended the year eighth overall.

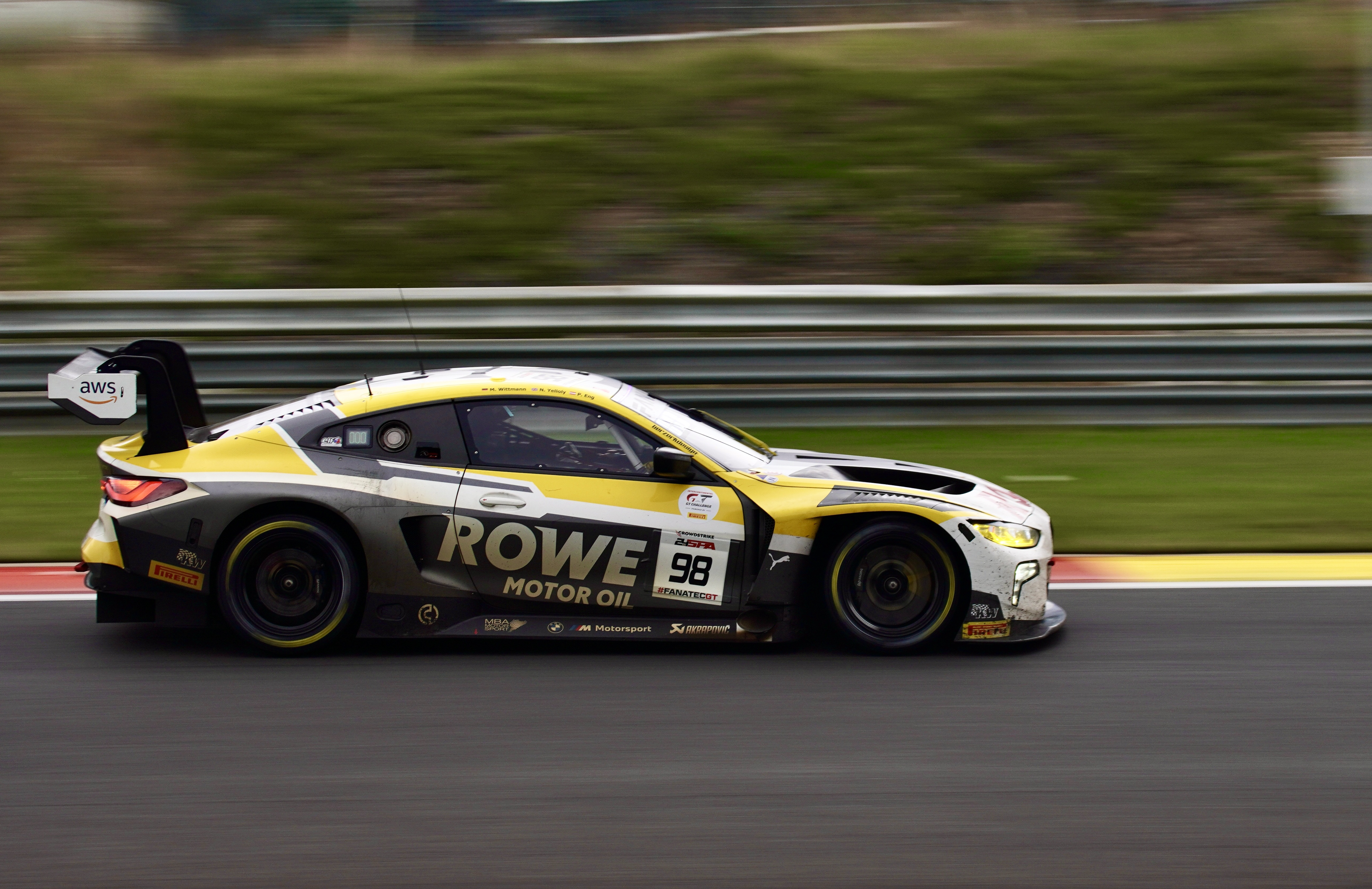
ROWE Racing's #98 BMW M4 GT3 driven by Yelloly, Philipp Eng and Marco Wittmann winner of the 2023 24 Hours of Spa

==== GT World Challenge ====
Having taken part various rounds of the GT World Challenge Europe Endurance Cup from 2018 onwards, Yelloly competed in the series full-time with ROWE Racing during the 2022 campaign. After failing to score points during the first two events, Yelloly and his teammates Augusto Farfus and Nicky Catsburg proved themselves as contenders for the race win during the 24 Hours of Spa, where, having led during the intermediate classifications after six and twelve hours respectively, a puncture set the squad back to sixth by the end of the event. With more points coming at the final round in Barcelona, the Briton finished twelfth in the championship.

== Sportscar career (2023–) ==
=== Top-class prototype racing ===
==== 2023 ====
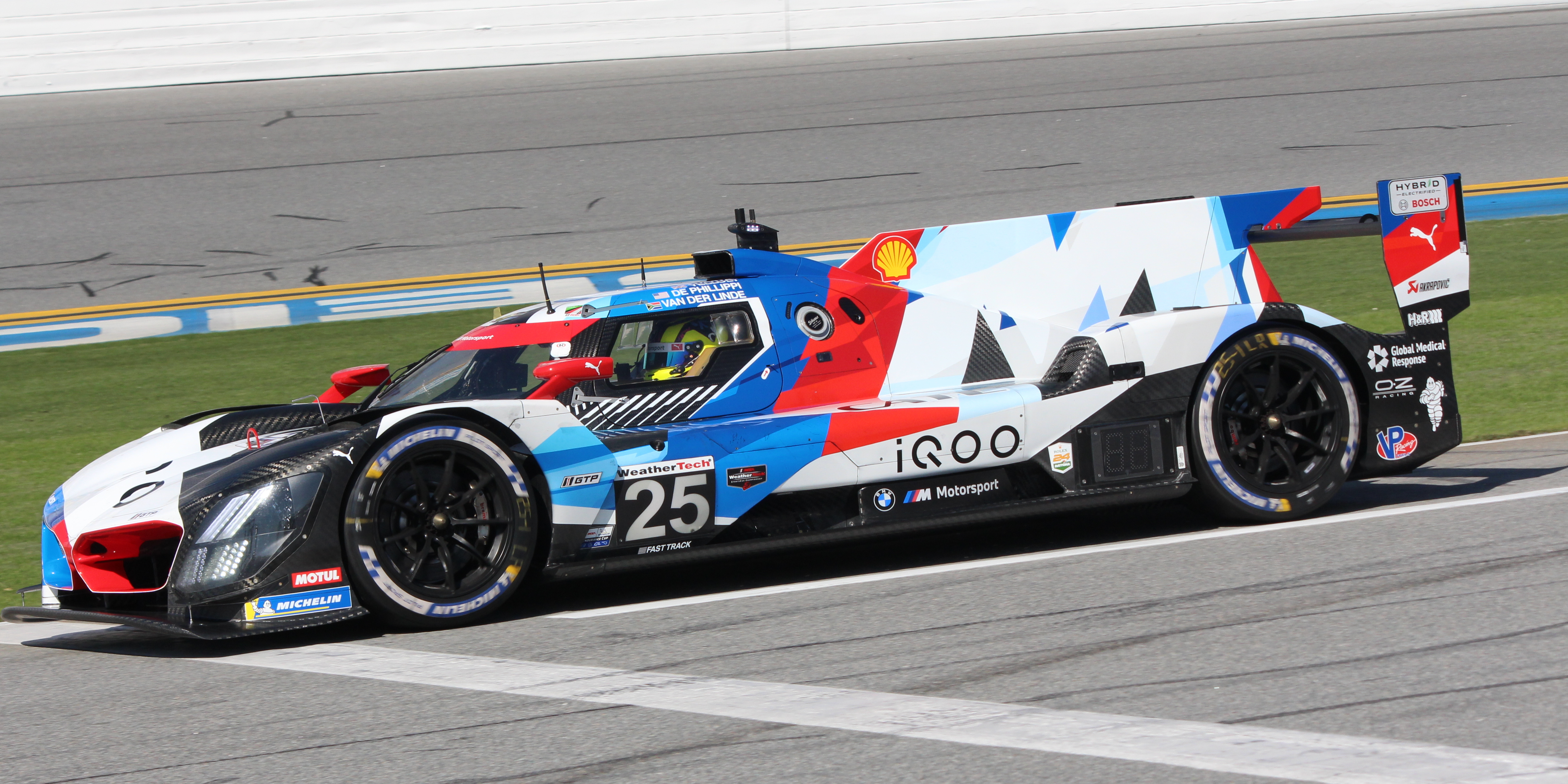
Yelloly made his prototype debut at the 2023 24 Hours of Daytona.

Yelloly moved into the IMSA SportsCar Championship for the 2023 season, becoming part of the BMW M Team RLL works team which entered a BMW M Hybrid V8 into the GTP category. Throughout the season opener at Daytona, technical issues would plague the outfit, which went on to finish 49th overall after an early hybrid system problem forced the No. 25 car to spend two and a half hours behind the pit wall. The team bounced back in Sebring, where, having engaged in battles with other cars in the category for the majority of the race, Yelloly profited from a collision between the No. 10 Acura and the pair of Porsche 963s ahead to take second place. At Long Beach, Yelloly qualified fourth. The race itself proved to be frantic, with Yelloly tapping the Acura of Tom Blomqvist into a spin at the first corner and keeping third place until the mandated driver change afterwards. Teammate Connor De Phillippi fought for a spot on the podium for the remainder of the contest, eventually securing another runner-up finish after a late-race crash from Ricky Taylor. Eighth in Monterey followed, as Yelloly lost third with 30 minutes to go before dropping down the order with old tyres. At Watkins Glen, the No. 25 crew fought up front all day and finished second, though they inherited the win after the #6 Porsche was disqualified. Yelloly and De Phillippi continued their strong form in Mosport, where they finished third, but multiple incidents for De Phillippi and a later technical issue led to a retirement at Road America. Third in Indianapolis and seventh at Petit Le Mans resulted in Yelloly finishing sixth in the standings.

Simultaneously, Yelloly remained with ROWE Racing in the GTWC Endurance Cup, sharing a car with Philipp Eng and Marco Wittmann. At the opening round in Monza they took a dominant win from pole position. In Le Castellet, Yelloly lost the lead to Raffaele Marciello and lost two more positions as the car's performance declined going into the night, though a penalty ahead promoted him to third. Then, a week after Yelloly had given BMW their maiden win in the GTP class at Watkins Glen, he and his teammates won the 24 Hours of Spa — Eng had driven the car into the lead on Sunday morning before Yelloly created a ten-second gap following a safety car with four hours to go. However, a lowly 15th at the Nürburgring and simultaneous victory for the ASP-Mercedes meant that the No. 98 crew went into the Barcelona finale 18 points behind the No. 88. Tenth place at the final round meant that Yelloly, Wittmann, and Eng finished second in the standings.

==== 2024 ====
Going into the 2024 IMSA season, Yelloly and De Phillippi remained with the #25 crew. Seventh at Daytona and fourth at Sebring preceded a missed fifth at Long Beach, where De Phillippi crashed out at turn 6, having pitted to repair damage beforehand following a pileup. More misfortune followed in Detroit: De Phillippi first slid into a tyre barrier on cold tyres after exiting the pits, then broke his car's rear right suspension on the exit of turn 2 minutes later. Road America saw Yelloly make a race-ending mistake, as the Briton crashed into the wall at Carousel corner. Fuel strategy conspired to earn the No. 25 its only podium of the season in Indianapolis, as Yelloly's crew came home second just behind the sister car. Yelloly and De Phillippi finished eighth in the championship, having retired from the season-ending Atlanta event following a technical failure.

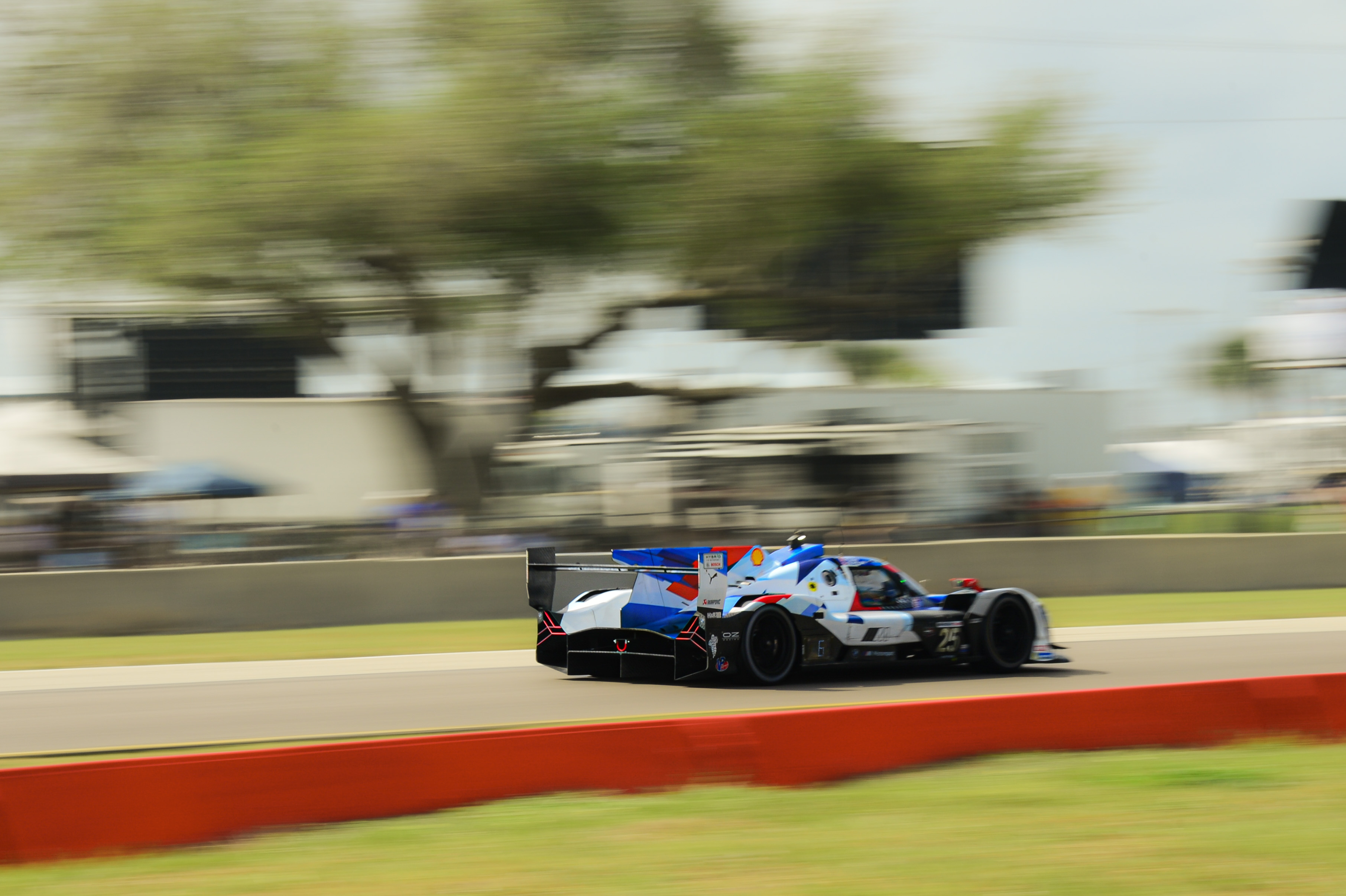
Yelloly at the 2024 12 Hours of Sebring.

After the race, BMW announced that Yelloly would be leaving the manufacturer after six years as a works driver. During the announcement, BMW M Motorsport director Andreas Roos stressed that Yelloly had "everything a manufacturer could wish for in a racing driver", describing him as "extremely talented", "a great guy", and reliable.

==== 2025 ====
In 2025, Yelloly made a switch to the Acura Meyer Shank Racing to partner Renger van der Zande in IMSA. The British driver finished fifth in the overall Drivers' and Teams' Championships, having won the Detroit Sports Car Classic and scoring two podiums, in the 12 Hours of Sebring and SportsCar Grand Prix, with his individual performance standing out.

==== 2026 ====
Yelloly continued his IMSA GTP program with Meyer Shank's team in 2026.

====== 2027 ======
Yelloly has moved into the new Ford Racing Hypercar program in FIA WEC, following Acura's withdrawal from the IMSA WeatherTech Sportscar Championship.

=== LMP2 outings ===
==== 2024 ====
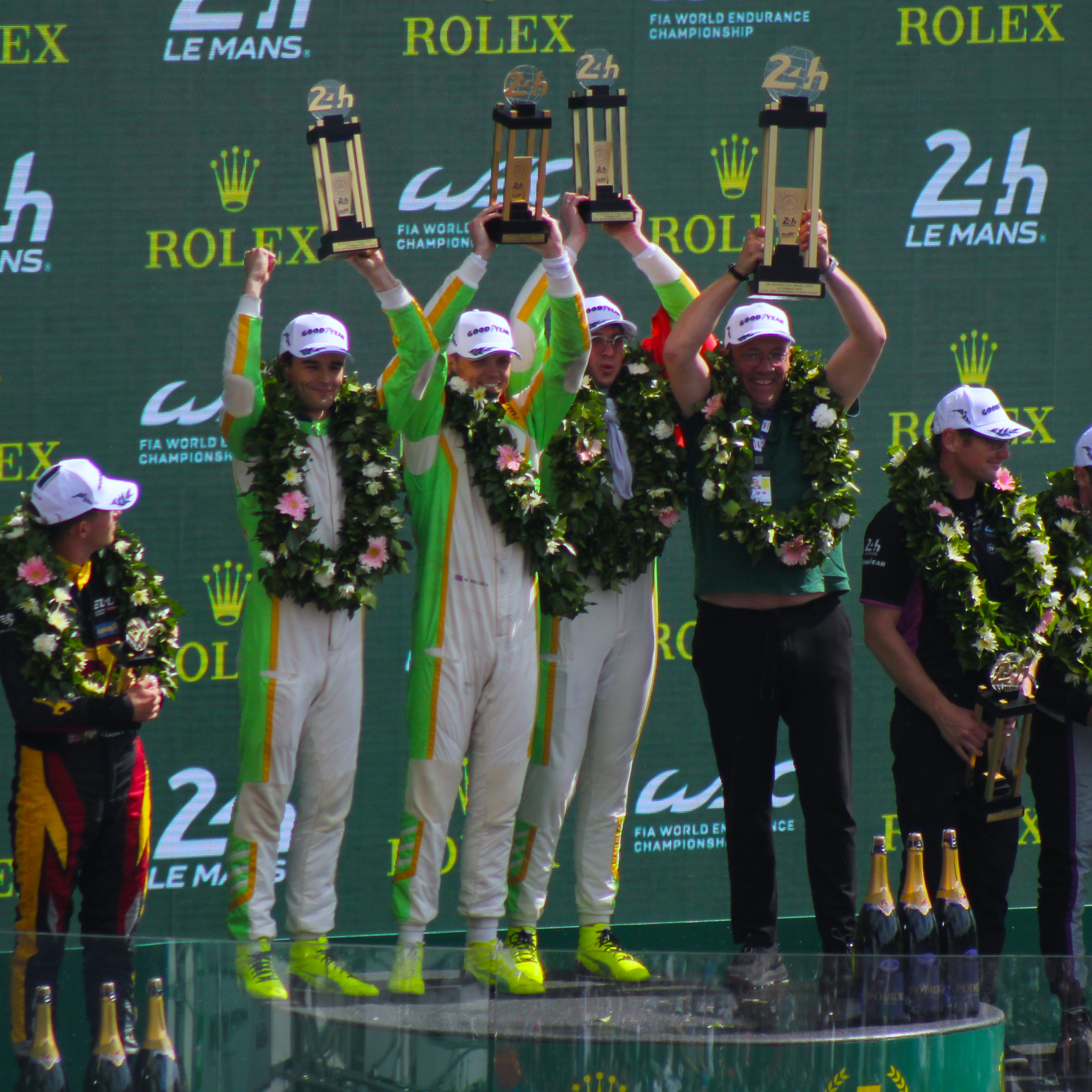
Yelloly took 24 Hours of Le Mans victory after a race-long battle with VDS Panis Racing

In 2024, Yelloly made his LMP2 debut, contesting the final three races of the European Le Mans Series. Driving in the Pro-Am class at Nielsen Racing as a replacement for Albert Costa, Yelloly scored a class podium at the Portimão season finale.

==== 2025 ====
The second part of Yelloly's 2025 campaign was competing in the 24 Hours of Le Mans and in the ELMS for Inter Europol Competition alongside Tom Dillmann and silver-ranked Jakub Śmiechowski. Yelloly, Śmiechowski and Dillmann have won the French classic. The number 43 car led the race from the morning, maintaining a lead of no more than twenty seconds over the No. 48 car of the VDS Panis Racing team. The last hour of the race had a dramatic twist; 34 minutes before the finish, the team was given a drive-through penalty as a result of Yelloly's speeding in the pit lane during the previous stop. Subsequently lost lead was regained after another few minutes due to a suspension failure in the rivals' car. Yelloly finished the race with a lead of nearly two minutes over Panis team. The Brit was also the fastest driver of the team and the second fastest LMP2 driver of the race.

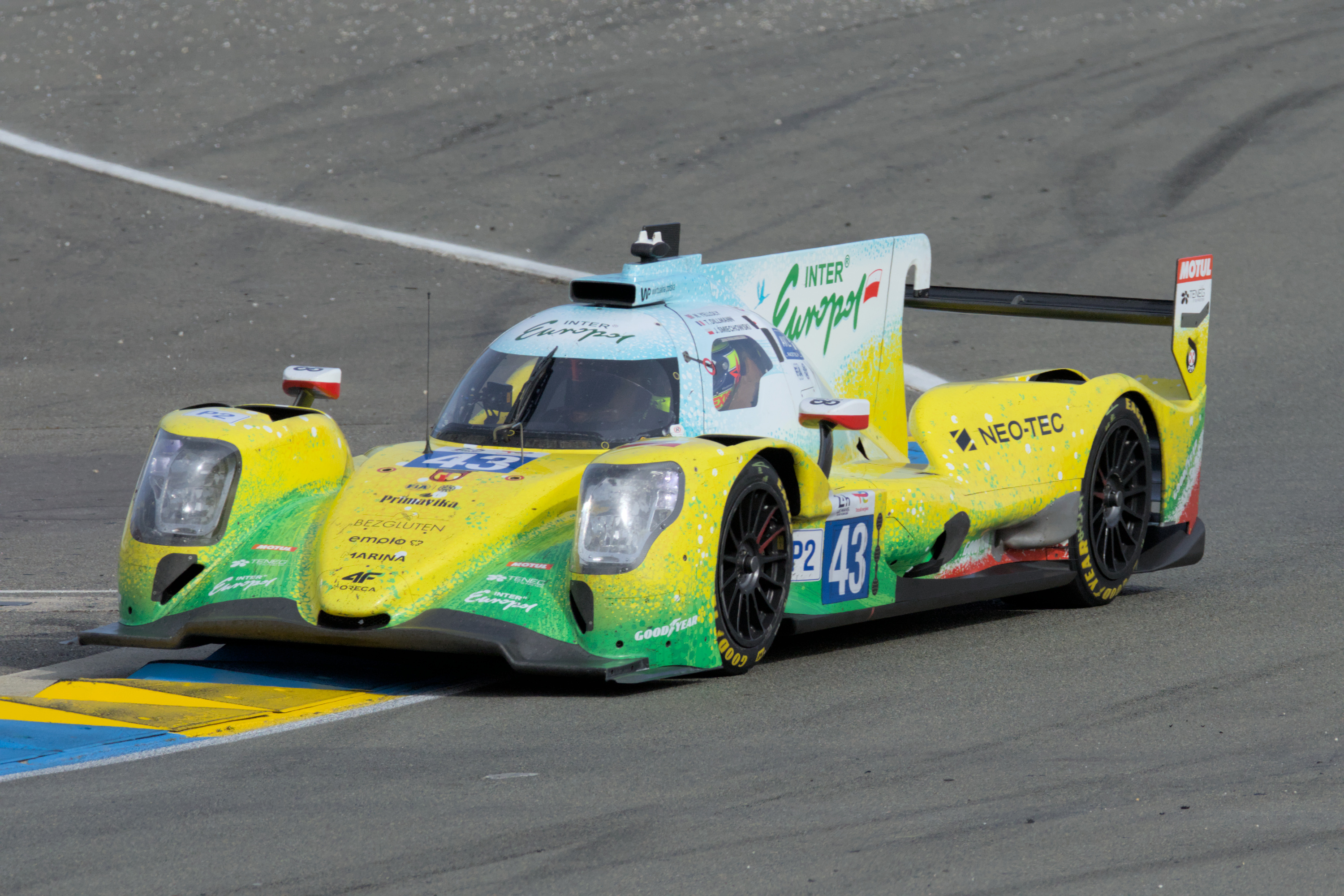
Yelloly successfully defended his last year's victory in the 24 Hours of Le Mans in the 2026 edition of the race

The battle with VDS Panis Racing continued throughout the year in the ELMS series, where it ended with a victory for the French team. Five second places in a total of six races earned Yelloly and his teammates second place in the overall series standings.

==== 2026 ====
In the 2026 season, Yelloly repeated his 2025 LMP2 program, returning to the ELMS and 24 Hours of Le Mans with Inter Europol Competition, driving alongside Dillmann and Śmiechowski. Yelloly successfully defended his 2025 victory in the 2026 edition of the race, finishing ahead of the sister car of the team. Dillmann, Śmiechowski and Yelloly utilized a slightly different tyre strategy than a sister car, which was in part due to both cars running close to each other in the last hours of the race, as well as saved fuel for most of the race.

== Formula One ==
In May 2019, Yelloly participated in the Young Driver Test at Circuit de Barcelona-Catalunya for Racing Point F1 Team. In December 2021, Yelloly participated in the post-season test at Yas Marina Circuit for Aston Martin. In July 2024, he drove the Aston Martin AMR24 in a filming day at Silverstone, following the British Grand Prix. He remains a test and simulator driver for the Aston Martin team.

== Racing record ==
=== Karting career summary ===
Season	Series	Position
2007	Super 1 National Championship – ICA	15th
2008	Super 1 National Championship – KF1	8th

=== Racing career summary ===
Season	Series	Team	Races	Wins	Poles	F/Laps	Podiums	Points	Position
2008	Formula Renault UK Winter Series	Fortec Competition	4	0	0	0	0	31	14th
2009	Formula Renault UK	Hitech Junior Team	20	0	0	0	0	83	19th
2009	Formula Renault UK Winter Series	Hitech Junior Team	4	0	0	0	2	93	**2nd**
2010	Formula Renault UK	Atech GP	20	1	1	2	3	312	7th
2010	Eurocup Formula Renault 2.0	Atech GP	2	0	0	0	0	N/A	NC†
2011	GP3 Series	Atech CRS GP	16	0	0	0	1	7	21st
2011	Formula Renault 3.5 Series	Pons Racing	6	0	0	0	1	36	14th
2012	Formula Renault 3.5 Series	Comtec Racing	17	2	1	0	4	122	5th
2013	GP3 Series	Carlin	16	0	0	1	4	107	6th
2013	Formula Renault 3.5 Series	Zeta Corse	1	0	0	0	0	0	28th
2014	GP3 Series	Status Grand Prix	18	1	0	0	4	127	6th
2015	GP2 Series	Hilmer Motorsport	12	0	0	1	0	19	19th
2015	Formula Renault 3.5 Series	Lotus	2	0	0	0	0	6	20th
2016	Porsche Carrera Cup Germany	Rookie Team Deutsche Post by Project 1	16	0	0	0	2	161	6th
2016	Porsche Supercup	Rookie Team Deutsche Post by Project 1	1	0	0	0	0	0	NC†
2017	Porsche Carrera Cup Germany	Team Deutsche Post by Project 1	14	3	0	0	8	237	**2nd**
2017	Porsche Supercup	MOMO Megatron Team PARTRAX	2	0	0	0	0	23	18th
2018	Porsche Supercup	Fach Auto Tech	10	2	2	2	3	146	**2nd**
2018	Blancpain GT Series Endurance Cup	Rowe Racing	2	0	0	0	0	0	NC
2019	China GT Championship	Fist Team AAI	10	5	1	0	8	190	**1st**
2019	Intercontinental GT Challenge	BMW Team Schnitzer	1	0	1	0	0	10	20th
2019	VLN Series – SP9	BMW Team Schnitzer	1	0	0	0	0	7.75	51st
2019	24 Hours of Nürburgring – SP9	Walkenhorst Motorsport	1	0	0	0	0	—N/a	DNF
2019	Formula One	SportPesa Racing Point F1 Team	Simulator driver						
2020	ADAC GT Masters	Schubert Motorsport	10	1	0	0	1	41	22nd
2020	GT World Challenge Europe Endurance Cup	Walkenhorst Motorsport	1	0	0	0	0	0	NC
2020	GT World Challenge Europe Endurance Cup	Boutsen Ginion Racing	1	0	0	0	0	0	NC
2020	GT World Challenge Europe Endurance Cup – Pro-Am	Boutsen Ginion Racing	1	0	0	0	0	8	23rd
2020	Intercontinental GT Challenge	Walkenhorst Motorsport	3	0	0	0	1	26	9th
2020	IMSA SportsCar Championship – GTD	Turner Motorsport	1	0	0	0	0	20	51st
2020	Nürburgring Endurance Series – SP9	Rowe Racing	3	0	0	0	0	19.83	18th
2020	24 Hours of Nürburgring – SP9	Rowe Racing	1	1	0	0	1	—N/a	**1st**
2020	Formula One	BWT Racing Point F1 Team	Simulator driver						
2021	ADAC GT Masters	Schubert Motorsport	14	0	0	0	3	104	8th
2021	GT World Challenge Europe Endurance Cup	Walkenhorst Motorsport	2	0	0	0	0	0	NC†
2021	Nürburgring Endurance Series – SP9	Rowe Racing	1	0	0	0	0	0	NC†
2021	24 Hours of Nürburgring – SP9	Rowe Racing	1	0	1	0	0	—N/a	DNF
2021	Formula One	Aston Martin Cognizant F1 Team	Simulator driver						
2022	IMSA SportsCar Championship – GTD Pro	BMW M Team RLL	2	0	0	0	0	542	20th
2022	GT World Challenge Europe Endurance Cup	Rowe Racing	5	0	0	0	0	34	12th
2022	24 Hours of Nürburgring – SP9	Rowe Racing	1	0	0	0	0	—N/a	DNF
2022	24H GT Series – GT3	Schubert Motorsport	1	0	0	0	0	0	NC†
2022	Formula One	Aston Martin Aramco Cognizant F1 Team	Simulator driver						
2023	IMSA SportsCar Championship – GTP	BMW M Team RLL	9	1	0	1	5	2687	6th
2023	GT World Challenge Europe Endurance Cup	Rowe Racing	5	2	1	0	3	77	**2nd**
2023	Nürburgring Endurance Series – SP9	Rowe Racing	1	0	0	0	0	0	NC†
2023	24 Hours of Nürburgring – SP9	Rowe Racing	1	0	0	0	0	—N/a	DNF
2023	Intercontinental GT Challenge	Rowe Racing	1	1	0	0	1	43	10th
2023	Intercontinental GT Challenge	Team WRT	1	0	0	0	1	43	10th
2023	Formula One	Aston Martin Aramco Cognizant F1 Team	Simulator driver						
2024	IMSA SportsCar Championship – GTP	BMW M Team RLL	9	0	0	0	1	2392	8th
2024	GT World Challenge Europe Endurance Cup	ROWE Racing	3	0	0	0	0	10	22nd
2024	European Le Mans Series – LMP2 Pro-Am	Nielsen Racing	3	0	0	0	1	37	9th
2024	GT World Challenge America – Pro-Am	Flying Lizard Motorsports	1	0	0	0	0	16	21st
2024	Formula One	Aston Martin Aramco Cognizant F1 Team	Simulator driver						
2024	24 Hours of Le Mans – Hypercar	BMW M Team WRT	Reserve driver						
2025	IMSA SportsCar Championship – GTP	Acura Meyer Shank Racing w/Curb-Agajanian	9	1	3	1	3	2657	5th
2025	European Le Mans Series – LMP2	Inter Europol Competition	6	0	1	2	5	92	**2nd**
2025	24 Hours of Le Mans - LMP2	Inter Europol Competition	1	1	0	0	1	—N/a	**1st**
2025	British GT Championship - GT3	Blackthorn	1	0	0	0	0	0	NC†
2025	Formula One	Aston Martin Aramco Cognizant F1 Team	Simulator driver						
2026	IMSA SportsCar Championship - GTP	Acura Meyer Shank Racing w/ Curb-Agajanian	9	1	3	1	2	2723	**3rd**
2026	Nürburgring Langstrecken-Serie - SP9	Team ABT Sportsline							
2026	24 Hours of Nürburgring - SP9	Schaeffler Team Abt	1	0	0	0	0	N/A	DNF
2026	European Le Mans Series - LMP2	Inter Europol Competition	5	1	1	1	2	53	7th
2026	24 Hours of Le Mans - LMP2	Inter Europol Competition	1	1	0	0	1	—N/a	**1st**
2026-27	Asian Le Mans Series - LMP2	Inter Europol Competition							

^{†} As Yelloly was a guest driver, he was ineligible to score points.
^{*} Season still in progress.

=== Complete Formula Renault UK results ===
(key) (Races in bold indicate pole position) (Races in italics indicate fastest lap)

Year	Entrant	1	2	3	4	5	6	7	8	9	10	11	12	13	14	15	16	17	18	19	20	21	Pos	Points
2009	Hitech Junior Team	BRI; 1 Ret	BRI; 2; 20	THR; 1; 18	THR; 2 Ret	DON; 1; 22	DON; 2 Ret	OUL; 1; 19	OUL; 2; 21	CRO; 1; 17	CRO; 2; 16	SIL1; 1; 20	SIL1; 2; 15	SNE; 1; 7	SNE; 2; 10	SIL2; 1 Ret	SIL2; 2; 9	ROC; 1 Ret	ROC; 2; 10	BHGP; 1; 10	BHGP; 2 Ret		19th	83
2010	Atech GP	THR; 1; 6	THR; 2; 11	ROC; 1 Ret	ROC; 2; 7	BHGP; 1 C	BHGP; 2; 4	OUL; 1; 6	OUL; 2; 14	CRO; 1; 16	CRO; 2; 11	SNE; 1; 3	SNE; 2; 6	SIL1; 1; 11	SIL1; 2; 2	SIL1; 3; 13	KNO; 1; 5	KNO; 2; 9	SIL2; 1; 7	SIL2; 2; 4	**BRI**; **1**; 1	BRI; 2; 7	7th	312

=== Complete Eurocup Formula Renault 2.0 results ===
(key) (Races in bold indicate pole position; races in italics indicate fastest lap)

Year	Entrant	1	2	3	4	5	6	7	8	9	10	11	12	13	14	15	16	DC	Points
2010	Atech GP	ALC; 1	ALC; 2	SPA; 1	SPA; 2	BRN; 1	BRN; 2	MAG; 1	MAG; 2	HUN; 1; 13	HUN; 2; 11	HOC; 1	HOC; 2	SIL; 1	SIL; 2	CAT; 1	CAT; 2	NC†	0

† As Yelloly was a guest driver, he was ineligible for points

=== Complete GP3 Series results ===
(key) (Races in bold indicate pole position) (Races in italics indicate fastest lap)

Year	Entrant	1	2	3	4	5	6	7	8	9	10	11	12	13	14	15	16	17	18	DC	Points
2011	ATECH CRS GP	IST; FEA; 13	IST; SPR; 11	CAT; FEA; 25	CAT; SPR; 18	VAL; FEA; 9	VAL; SPR; 12	SIL; FEA; 3	SIL; SPR; 6	NÜR; FEA; 16	NÜR; SPR; 9	HUN; FEA; 21	HUN; SPR; Ret	SPA; FEA; Ret	SPA; SPR; 13	MNZ; FEA; Ret	MNZ; SPR; Ret			21st	7
2013	Carlin	CAT; FEA; 4	CAT; SPR; Ret	VAL; FEA; 12	VAL; SPR; 9	SIL; FEA; 6	SIL; SPR; 2	NÜR; FEA; 5	NÜR; SPR; 3	HUN; FEA; 15	HUN; SPR; 13	SPA; FEA; 6	SPA; SPR; 4	MNZ; FEA; 2	MNZ; SPR; Ret	YMC; FEA; 3	YMC; SPR; 6			6th	107
2014	Status Grand Prix	CAT; FEA; 9	CAT; SPR; 7	RBR; FEA; 7	RBR; SPR; 5	SIL; FEA; 5	SIL; SPR; 2	HOC; FEA; 4	HOC; SPR; 5	HUN; FEA; 2	HUN; SPR; 11	SPA; FEA; 3	SPA; SPR; 5	MNZ; FEA; 10	MNZ; SPR; 5	SOC; FEA; 9	SOC; SPR; 6	YMC; FEA; 8	YMC; SPR; 1	6th	127

=== Complete Formula Renault 3.5 Series results ===
(key) (Races in bold indicate pole position) (Races in italics indicate fastest lap)

Year	Team	1	2	3	4	5	6	7	8	9	10	11	12	13	14	15	16	17	Pos	Points
2011	Pons Racing	ALC; 1	ALC; 2	SPA; 1	SPA; 2	MNZ; 1	MNZ; 2	MON; 1	NÜR; 1	NÜR; 2	HUN; 1	HUN; 2	SIL; 1 DSQ	SIL; 2; 14	LEC; 1 Ret	LEC; 2; 5	CAT; 1; 6	CAT; 2; 2	14th	36
2012	Comtec Racing	ALC; 1; 1	ALC; 2; 18	MON; 1; 7	SPA; 1; 9	SPA; 2; 2	NÜR; 1 Ret	NÜR; 2; 1	MSC; 1; 12	MSC; 2; 16	SIL; 1; 4	SIL; 2; 8	HUN; 1; 14	HUN; 2; 20	**LEC**; **1**; 2	LEC; 2; 4	CAT; 1; 15	CAT; 2; 13	5th	122
2013	Zeta Corse	MNZ; 1	MNZ; 2	ALC; 1	ALC; 2	MON; 1; 14	SPA; 1	SPA; 2	MSC; 1	MSC; 2	RBR; 1	RBR; 2	HUN; 1	HUN; 2	LEC; 1	LEC; 2	CAT; 1	CAT; 2	28th	0
2015	Lotus	ALC; 1	ALC; 2	MON; 1	SPA; 1	SPA; 2	HUN; 1	HUN; 2	RBR; 1	RBR; 2	SIL; 1; 14	SIL; 2; 7	NÜR; 1	NÜR; 2	BUG; 1	BUG; 2	JER; 1	JER; 2	20th	6

=== Complete GP2 Series results ===
(key) (Races in bold indicate pole position) (Races in italics indicate fastest lap)

Year	Entrant	1	2	3	4	5	6	7	8	9	10	11	12	13	14	15	16	17	18	19	20	21	22	DC	Points
2015	Hilmer Motorsport	BHR; FEA	BHR; SPR	CAT; FEA; Ret	CAT; SPR; 14	MON; FEA; 10	MON; SPR; 9	RBR; FEA; 8	RBR; SPR; Ret	SIL; FEA; 7	SIL; SPR; 5	HUN; FEA; Ret	HUN; SPR; 17	SPA; FEA; Ret	SPA; SPR; 17	MNZ; FEA	MNZ; SPR	SOC; FEA	SOC; SPR	BHR; FEA	BHR; SPR	YMC; FEA	YMC; SPR	19th	19

=== Complete Porsche Carrera Cup Germany results ===
(key) (Races in bold indicate pole position) (Races in italics indicate fastest lap)

Year	Team	1	2	3	4	5	6	7	8	9	10	11	12	13	14	15	16	DC	Points
2016	Rookie Team Deutsche Post by Project 1	OSC; 1; 9	OSC; 2; 7	HOC1; 1; 7	HOC1; 2; 7	RBR; 1; 10	RBR; 2; 9	LAU; 1; 10	LAU; 2; 7	NOR; 1 DNS	NOR; 2; 12	ZAN; 1; 5	ZAN; 2; 11	NÜR; 1; 3	NÜR; 2; 4	HOC2; 1; 4	HOC2; 2; 2	6th	161
2017	Team Deutsche Post by Project 1	HOC1; 1; 5	HOC1; 2; 4	LAU; 1; 6	LAU; 2; 5	RBR; 1; 3	RBR; 2; 2	NOR; 1; 1	NOR; 2; 2	NÜR1; 1	NÜR1; 2	NÜR2; 1; 1	NÜR2; 2; 2	SAC; 1; 2	SAC; 2; 1	HOC2; 1; 13	HOC2; 2; 4	2nd	237

=== Complete Porsche Supercup results ===
(key) (Races in bold indicate pole position) (Races in italics indicate fastest lap)

Year	Team	1	2	3	4	5	6	7	8	9	10	11	DC	Points
2016	Rookie Team Deutsche Post by Project 1	CAT	MON	RBR	SIL; 5	HUN	HOC	SPA	MNZ	COA	COA		NC†	0†
2017	MOMO Megatron Team PARTRAX	CAT	CAT	MON	RBR	SIL	HUN	SPA; 7	SPA; 4	MNZ	MEX	MEX	18th	23
2018	Fach Auto Tech	CAT; 5	**MON**; 1	RBR; 5	SIL; 5	**HOC**; 1	HUN; 5	SPA; 5	MNZ; 4	MEX; 4	MEX; 2		2nd	146

^{†} As Yelloly was a guest driver, he was ineligible to score points.

=== Complete GT World Challenge Europe Endurance Cup results ===
(Races in bold indicate pole position) (Races in italics indicate fastest lap)

Year	Team	Car	Class	1	2	3	4	5	6	7	Pos.	Points
2018	Rowe Racing	BMW M6 GT3	Pro	MNZ	SIL; Ret	LEC; Ret	SPA; 6H	SPA; 12H	SPA; 24H	CAT	NC	0
2020	Boutsen Ginion Racing	BMW M6 GT3	Pro-Am	IMO; 27	NÜR						23rd	8
2020	Walkenhorst Motorsport	BMW M6 GT3	Pro			SPA; 6H; 23	SPA; 12H; 18	SPA; 24H; Ret	LEC		NC	0
2021	Walkenhorst Motorsport	BMW M6 GT3	Pro	MNZ	LEC	SPA; 6H	SPA; 12H	SPA; 24H	NÜR; 12	CAT; 21	NC	0
2022	ROWE Racing	BMW M4 GT3	Pro	IMO; 11	LEC; 11	SPA; 6H; 1	SPA; 12H; 1	SPA; 24H; 6	HOC; 11	CAT; 9	12th	34
2023	ROWE Racing	BMW M4 GT3	Pro	**MNZ**; 1	LEC; 3	SPA; 6H; 8	SPA; 12H; 6	SPA; 24H; 1	NÜR; 15	CAT; 10	2nd	77
2024	ROWE Racing	BMW M4 GT3	Pro	LEC; 12	SPA; 6H; Ret	SPA; 12H; Ret	SPA; 24H; Ret	NÜR; 5	MNZ	JED	22nd	10

=== Complete China GT Championship results ===
(key) (Races in bold indicate pole position) (Races in italics indicate fastest lap)

Year	Entrant	1	2	3	4	5	6	7	8	9	10	11	12	DC	Points
2019	Fist Team AAI	**SEP**; **1**; 1	SEP; 2; 3	NIN; 1; 1	NIN; 2; 1	SHA1; 1; 2	SHA1; 2; 2	QIN; 1 Ret	QIN; 2; 5	TIA; 1; 4	TIA; 2; 1	SHA2; 1; 1	SHA2; 2 Ret	1st	190

=== Complete ADAC GT Masters results ===
(key) (Races in bold indicate pole position) (Races in italics indicate fastest lap)

Year	Team	1	2	3	4	5	6	7	8	9	10	11	12	13	14	DC	Points
2020	Schubert Motorsport	LAU1; 1; 23	LAU1; 2 Ret	NÜR; 1; 27	NÜR; 2; 21	HOC; 1; 15	HOC; 2; 22	SAC; 1	SAC; 2	RBR; 1; 1	RBR; 2; 5	LAU2; 1	LAU2; 2	OSC; 1 Ret	OSC; 2; 12	22nd	41
2021	Schubert Motorsport	OSC; 1; 4	OSC; 2; 2	RBR; 1 Ret	RBR; 2; 3	ZAN; 1; 3	ZAN; 2 Ret	LAU; 1; 7	LAU; 2; 11	SAC; 1; 10	SAC; 2 DSQ	HOC; 1; 22	HOC; 2 Ret	NÜR; 1; 9	NÜR; 2; 8	8th	104

=== Complete IMSA SportsCar Championship results ===
(key) (Races in bold indicate pole position) (Races in italics indicate fastest lap)

Year	Team	Class	Chassis	Engine	1	2	3	4	5	6	7	8	9	10	11	Pos.	Points
2020	Turner Motorsport	GTD	BMW M6 GT3	BMW 4.4 L Turbo V8	DAY	DAY	SEB	ELK	VIR	ATL	MDO	CLT	PET	LGA	SEB; 11	51st	20
2022	BMW M Team RLL	GTD Pro	BMW M4 GT3	BMW S58B30T0 3.0 L Twin Turbo I6	DAY; 9	SEB; 4	LBH	LGA	WGL	MOS	LIM	ELK	VIR	PET		20th	542
2023	BMW M Team RLL	GTP	BMW M Hybrid V8	BMW P66/3 4.0 L Turbo V8	DAY; 9	SEB; 2	LBH; 2	LGA; 8	WGL; 1	MOS; 3	ELK; 10	IMS; 3	PET; 7			6th	2687
2024	BMW M Team RLL	GTP	BMW M Hybrid V8	BMW P66/3 4.0 L Turbo V8	DAY; 7	SEB; 4	LBH; 9	LGA; 7	DET; 10	WGL; 6	ELK; 10	IMS; 2	PET; 10			8th	2392
2025	Acura Meyer Shank Racing w/ Curb-Agajanian	GTP	Acura ARX-06	Acura AR24e 2.4 L turbo V6	DAY; 8	SEB; 3	LBH; 11	LGA; 5	**DET**; 1	**WGL**; 6	**ELK**; 3	IMS; 5	PET; 7			5th	2657
2026	Acura Meyer Shank Racing w/ Curb-Agajanian	GTP	Acura ARX-06	Acura AR24e 2.4 L Turbo V6	**DAY**; 5	SEB; 6	**LBH**; 1	LGA; 5	DET; 4	WGL; 2	**ELK**; 4	IMS; 7	PET; 10			3rd	2723

=== Complete European Le Mans Series results ===
(key) (Races in bold indicate pole position) (Races in italics indicate fastest lap)

Year	Entrant	Class	Chassis	Engine	1	2	3	4	5	6	Rank	Points
2024	Nielsen Racing	LMP2 Pro-Am	Oreca 07	Gibson GK428 4.2 L V8	CAT	LEC	IMO	SPA; 4	MUG; 5	ALG; 3	9th	37
2025	Inter Europol Competition	LMP2	Oreca 07	Gibson GK428 4.2 L V8	CAT; 10	**LEC**; 2	IMO; 2	SPA; 2	SIL; 2	ALG; 2	2nd	92
2026	Inter Europol Competition	LMP2	Oreca 07	Gibson GK428 4.2 L V8	CAT; 5	LEC	IMO; 10	SPA; 1	**SIL**; 10	ALG; 3	7th	53

^{*} Season still in progress.

=== Complete 24 Hours of Le Mans results ===
Year	Team	Co-Drivers	Car	Class	Laps	Pos.	Class Pos.
2025	(Poland) Inter Europol Competition	(France) Tom Dillmann (Poland) Jakub Śmiechowski	Oreca 07-Gibson	LMP2	367	18th	**1st**
2026	(Poland) Inter Europol Competition	(France) Tom Dillmann (Poland) Jakub Śmiechowski	Oreca 07-Gibson	LMP2	361	16th	**1st**

=== Complete British GT Championship results ===
(key) (Races in bold indicate pole position) (Races in italics indicate fastest lap)

Year	Team	Car	Class	1	2	3	4	5	6	7	8	9	DC	Points
2025	Blackthorn	Aston Martin Vantage AMR GT3 Evo	GT3	DON; 1	SIL; 1	OUL; 1	OUL; 2	SPA; 1	SNE; 1	SNE; 2	BRH; 1	DON; 1; 5	NC†	0†

^{†} As Yelloly was a guest driver, he was ineligible for points.

Sporting positions
Preceded by Xu Jia	China GT Championship; Champion; 2019	Succeeded by Incumbent
