= Dennis Olsen (racing driver) =

Norwegian racing driver (born 1996)

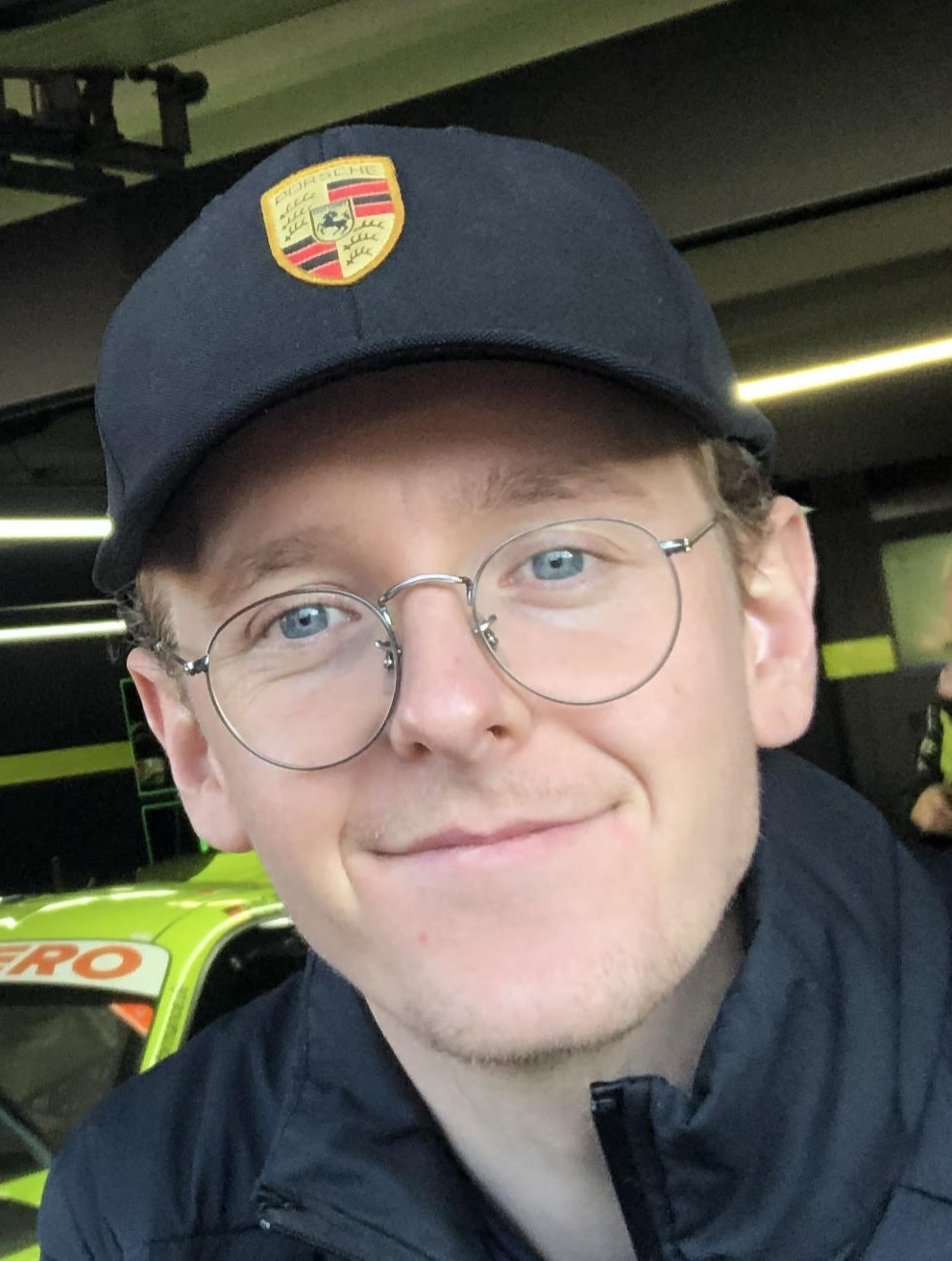
- Olsen in 2022
- Nationality: (Norway) Norwegian
- Born: 14 April 1996 (age 30) Våler, Norway

FIA World Endurance Championship career
- Debut season: 2021
- Current team: Proton Competition
- Categorisation: FIA Gold (until 2022); FIA Platinum (2023–)
- Car number: 88
- Former teams: Team Project 1
- Starts: 18
- Wins: 0
- Poles: 1
- Fastest laps: 0
- Best finish: 15th in 2024

Deutsche Tourenwagen Masters career
- Debut season: 2022
- Former teams: SSR Performance, Manthey EMA
- Starts: 29
- Championships: 0
- Wins: 1
- Podiums: 5
- Poles: 1
- Fastest laps: 0
- Best finish: 7th in 2023

Championship titles
- 2017 2019: Porsche Carrera Cup Germany; Intercontinental GT Challenge

Dennis Olsen (born 14 April 1996) is a Norwegian racing driver who currently competes in the IMSA SportsCar Championship for Ford Multimatic Motorsports as a Ford factory driver. He has previously competed full-time in the Deutsche Tourenwagen Masters and Porsche Supercup, and is a former Porsche Junior Driver and former member of the Red Bull Racing Simulator Development Program. He was champion of the Porsche Carrera Cup Germany in 2017.

== Career ==
=== Karting ===
Born in Våler, Norway, Olsen began karting in his native Norway, aged six. After winning numerous junior titles, he stepped up to the KF3 class in 2009, winning the Norwegian title. He retained his title in 2010, a year which also saw him finish second in the Junior Monaco Kart Cup and third in the German Junior Karting Championship. In 2011, Olsen won his third consecutive Norwegian KF3 title, the German KF3 championship and the WSK Cup Final KF2 titles. For his final year of karting in 2012, he successfully defended his WSK Cup Final KF2 title and also won the prestigious German KF1 karting championship.

=== Toyota Racing Series ===
Olsen began his single-seater career in early 2013, racing in the New Zealand-based Toyota Racing Series, becoming the first Norwegian driver to enter the series. He finished the championship in thirteenth place, scoring a best race result of fifth in the final round of the series at Manfeild.

=== Formula Renault 2.0 ===
Olsen's main racing program for 2013 was in the Formula Renault 2.0 NEC championship, racing for German team Josef Kaufmann Racing. He finished third in the standings, behind the British Fortec Motorsports pairing of Jack Aitken and Matt Parry after taking three podium finishes. He also recorded a Pole position for the final race of the season at Zandvoort, but the race was cancelled due to heavy rain. He also contested a one-off round of the Formula Renault 2.0 Alps season at Spa-Francorchamps with the AV Formula team.

For 2014, Olsen graduated to the Eurocup Formula Renault 2.0 championship with Prema Powerteam. He finished second in the standings, behind champion Nyck de Vries, after taking three podium places including race wins at Spa-Francorchamps and the Nürburgring. At the final round of the season in Jerez, Olsen finished second in the first race, a result that initially earned him the runner-up spot in the championship, but was later disqualified for a technical infringement. He did, however, secure second in the championship the following day after finishing seventh in the final race of the season.

Olsen also contested a partial campaign in the Formula Renault 2.0 Alps championship with Prema, taking six top-ten finishes in the six races he took part in.

Olsen remained in Eurocup Formula Renault 2.0 for a second season in 2015, switching to Manor MP Motorsport.

=== Sports car racing ===
In 2023, Olsen returned to the Deutsche Tourenwagen Masters for a second consecutive season. After completing the 2022 season with SSR Performance, Olsen moved to Manthey EMA for 2023. With two podiums, he finished seventh in the standings, whilst teammate Thomas Preining won the title. In addition, Olsen competed in the GT World Challenge Europe Endurance Cup with Rutronik Racing, sharing a Pro class entry with Laurin Heinrich and Preining. There, one podium once again resulted in seventh place overall.

For 2024, Olsen would switch to become a Ford factory driver, competing with the new Ford Mustang GT3 for Proton Competition alongside Mikkel O. Pedersen and bronze-ranked Giorgio Roda. Following a slow start in the first three rounds, Olsen led the team towards its first podium of the season, finishing third at the 24 Hours of Le Mans.

2025 saw Olsen continue to compete in World Endurance Championship with Proton Competition, driving the No. 88 Ford Mustang GT3 alongside Stefano Gattuso and Giammarco Levorato. With a best finish of second place at Spa, Olsen finished the season in 16th with 27 points. He also drove for Ford Multimatic in IMSA in the endurance rounds, paired with Christopher Mies and Frédéric Vervisch. The trio gave the Mustang GT3 its first victory with a win in the season-opening Rolex 24. Olsen would also compete in the Nürburgring 24 Hours for HRT Ford Performance as teammates with Arjun Maini, Jusuf Owega, and Frank Stippler. He would not finish following an incident at Flugplatz.

== Racing record ==
=== Career summary ===
Season	Series	Team	Races	Wins	Poles	F/Laps	Podiums	Points	Position
2013	Formula Renault 2.0 NEC	Josef Kaufmann Racing	16	0	1	0	3	211	**3rd**
2013	Formula Renault 2.0 Alps	AV Formula	2	0	0	0	0	0	37th
2013	Toyota Racing Series	M2 Competition	15	0	0	0	0	410	13th
2014	Eurocup Formula Renault 2.0	Prema Powerteam	14	2	2	3	3	124	**2nd**
2014	Formula Renault 2.0 Alps	Prema Powerteam	6	0	0	0	0	0	NC†
2015	Eurocup Formula Renault 2.0	Manor MP Motorsport	17	1	1	0	3	101	8th
2015	Formula Renault 2.0 NEC	Manor MP Motorsport	6	0	0	0	1	98	14th
2015	Formula Masters China	Absolute Racing	3	0	0	0	1	17	16th
2015	Masters of Formula 3	Threebond with T-Sport	1	0	0	0	0	N/A	11th
2016	Porsche Carrera Cup Germany	Lechner Huber Racing	16	0	0	0	6	218	**3rd**
2016	Porsche GT3 Middle East Championship	Walter Lechner Racing	2	0	0	0	1	40	17th
2016	Porsche Supercup	Lechner MSG Racing Team	1	0	0	0	0	10	18th
2016	Porsche Supercup	MRS GT-Racing	1	0	0	0	0	10	18th
2016–17	Porsche GT3 Cup Challenge Middle East		2	0	0	0	1	40	17th
2017	Porsche Supercup	Walter Lechner Racing Team	11	3	4	3	9	186	**2nd**
2017	Porsche Carrera Cup Germany	Konrad Motorsport	14	6	2	5	12	273	**1st**
2017	Porsche Carrera Cup Scandinavia	Mtech Competition	2	2	2	2	2	0	NC†
2017	24H Series - A6	Manthey Racing	1	0	0	0	1	0	NC†
2018	European Le Mans Series - LMGTE	Proton Competition	5	1	1	0	1	65	6th
2018	24H GT Series - A6	Herberth Motorsport	1	0	0	0	0	0	NC†
2018	24 Hours of Nürburgring - SP9	Manthey Racing	1	0	0	0	0	N/A	17th
2019	Blancpain GT World Challenge America	Wright Motorsports	6	0	0	1	0	23	17th
2019	Blancpain GT World Challenge America - Pro-Am	Wright Motorsports	6	0	3	3	5	89	9th
2019	IMSA SportsCar Championship - GTD	Wright Motorsports	1	0	0	0	0	73	33rd
2019	IMSA SportsCar Championship - GTD	Pfaff Motorsports	2	1	0	0	1	73	33rd
2019	Blancpain GT World Challenge Asia	Absolute Racing	2	0	2	0	0	9	33rd
2019	Blancpain GT World Challenge Asia - Pro-Am	Absolute Racing	2	0	0	0	0	22	22nd
2019	Blancpain GT Series Endurance Cup	Rowe Racing	5	0	0	0	0	22	12th
2019	Intercontinental GT Challenge	EBM	1	1	0	0	1	73	**1st**
2019	Intercontinental GT Challenge	Wright Motorsports	1	0	0	0	0	73	**1st**
2019	Intercontinental GT Challenge	Rowe Racing	1	0	0	0	0	73	**1st**
2019	Intercontinental GT Challenge	Absolute Racing	1	0	0	0	1	73	**1st**
2019	Intercontinental GT Challenge	Frikadelli Racing Team	1	1	1	1	1	73	**1st**
2019	24 Hours of Le Mans - LMGTE Pro	Porsche GT Team	1	0	0	0	0	N/A	7th
2019	24 Hours of Nürburgring - SP9	Manthey Racing	1	0	0	0	0	N/A	4th
2020	GT World Challenge Europe Endurance Cup	GPX Racing	1	0	1	1	0	6	22nd
2020	GT World Challenge Europe Endurance Cup	Frikadelli Racing Team	1	0	0	0	0	6	22nd
2020	IMSA SportsCar Championship - GTD	Pfaff Motorsports	2	0	1	0	0	44	35th
2020	Intercontinental GT Challenge	Frikadelli Racing Team	1	0	0	0	0	6	18th
2020	Nürburgring Endurance Series - SP9	Falken Motorsports	1	0	0	0	0	30.94	**2nd**
2020	Nürburgring Endurance Series - SP9	KCMG	4	0	1	0	0	30.94	**2nd**
2020	24 Hours of Nürburgring - SP9	KCMG	1	0	0	0	0	N/A	13th
2021	FIA World Endurance Championship - LMGTE Am	Team Project 1	2	0	0	0	0	0.5	24th
2021	24 Hours of Le Mans - LMGTE Am	Team Project 1	1	0	0	0	0	N/A	DNF
2021	ADAC GT Masters	KÜS Team Bernhard	2	0	0	0	0	0	44th
2021	Intercontinental GT Challenge	Schnabl Engineering	1	0	0	0	0	2	20th
2021	Intercontinental GT Challenge	GMG Racing	1	0	0	0	0	2	20th
2021	GT World Challenge Europe Endurance Cup	Schnabl Engineering	1	0	0	0	0	4	27th
2021	Nürburgring Endurance Series - SP9	Frikadelli Racing Team	1	0	1	0	1	0	NC†
2021	Nürburgring Endurance Series - SP9	Falken Motorsports	4	0	0	0	2	0	NC†
2021	24 Hours of Nürburgring - SP9	Frikadelli Racing Team	1	0	0	0	0	N/A	DNF
2022	Deutsche Tourenwagen Masters	SSR Performance	15	1	1	0	3	89	10th
2022	IMSA SportsCar Championship - GTD Pro	KCMG	1	0	0	1	1	324	24th
2022	GT World Challenge Europe Endurance Cup	KCMG	1	0	0	0	0	12	25th
2022	Intercontinental GT Challenge	KCMG	1	0	0	0	0	12	25th*
2022	24 Hours of Nürburgring - SP9	KCMG	1	0	0	0	0	N/A	DNF
2022	Nürburgring Endurance Series - SP9	KCMG	2	0	0	0	1	0	NC†
2022	Nürburgring Endurance Series - SP9	EMA Motorsport	1	0	0	0	0	0	NC†
2023	Deutsche Tourenwagen Masters	Manthey EMA	16	0	0	0	2	129	7th
2023	GT World Challenge Europe Endurance Cup	Rutronik Racing	5	0	0	1	1	38	7th
2023	Intercontinental GT Challenge	Rutronik Racing	1	0	0	0	0	12	23rd
2023	24 Hours of Nürburgring - SP9	Rutronik Racing	1	0	0	0	0	N/A	5th
2023	Nürburgring Endurance Series - SP9	Rutronik Racing	1	0	0	0	0	0	NC†
2023	Nürburgring Endurance Series - SP9	Dinamic GT	1	0	0	0	0	0	NC†
2023	GT World Challenge Asia - GT3	R&B Racing	6	1	0	0	3	65	12th
2023	GT World Challenge Asia - Pro-Am Cup	R&B Racing	6	1	0	0	3	67	11th
2023	IMSA SportsCar Championship - GTD	Wright Motorsports	1	0	0	0	0	239	56th
2024	FIA World Endurance Championship - LMGT3	Proton Competition	8	0	0	0	1	37	15th
2024	IMSA SportsCar Championship - GTD	Proton Competition	1	0	0	0	0	126	72nd
2024	GT World Challenge Europe Endurance Cup	Proton Competition	4	0	0	0	0	1	31st
2024	Nürburgring Langstrecken-Serie - SP9	Herberth Motorsport							
2024	Intercontinental GT Challenge	Herberth Motorsport	1	0	0	0	0	0	26th
2024	24 Hours of Nürburgring - SP9	Herberth Motorsport	1	0	0	0	0	N/A	16th
2025	FIA World Endurance Championship - LMGT3	Proton Competition	8	0	1	0	1	27	16th
2025	IMSA SportsCar Championship - GTD Pro	Ford Multimatic Motorsports	3	1	0	0	1	935	17th
2025	Nürburgring Langstrecken-Serie - SP9	HRT Ford Performance							
2025	24 Hours of Nürburgring - SP9	HRT Ford Performance	1	0	0	0	0	N/A	DNF
2026	IMSA SportsCar Championship - GTD Pro	Ford Racing	10	1	0	2	3	2821	6th
2026	Nürburgring Langstrecken-Serie - SP9	HRT Ford Racing							
2026	24 Hours of Nürburgring - SP9	HRT Ford Racing	1	0	0	0	0	N/A	6th
2026	Intercontinental GT Challenge	HRT Ford Racing	2	0	0	0	0	28*	10th*
2026	Intercontinental GT Challenge	Miedecke Motorsport by Team MPC	1	0	1	0	1	28*	10th*

^{†} As Olsen was a guest driver, he was ineligible for championship points. ^{*} Season still in progress.

=== Complete Formula Renault 2.0 Alps results ===
(key) (Races in bold indicate pole position; races in italics indicate fastest lap)

Year	Team	1	2	3	4	5	6	7	8	9	10	11	12	13	14	Pos	Points
2013	AV Formula	VLL; 1	VLL; 2	IMO1; 1	IMO1; 2	SPA; 1; 15	SPA; 2 Ret	MNZ; 1	MNZ; 2	MIS; 1	MIS; 2	MUG; 1	MUG; 2	IMO2; 1	IMO2; 2	37th	0
2014	Prema Powerteam	IMO; 1; 5	IMO; 2; 8	PAU; 1	PAU; 2	RBR; 1	RBR; 2	SPA; 1	SPA; 2	MNZ; 1	MNZ; 2	MUG; 1; 8	MUG; 2; 5	JER; 1; 5	JER; 2; 4	NC†	0

† As Olsen was a guest driver, he was ineligible for points

=== Complete Formula Renault 2.0 NEC results ===
(key) (Races in bold indicate pole position) (Races in italics indicate fastest lap)

Year	Entrant	1	2	3	4	5	6	7	8	9	10	11	12	13	14	15	16	17	DC	Points
2013	Josef Kaufmann Racing	HOC; 1; 11	HOC; 2; 16	HOC; 3; 11	NÜR; 1; 7	NÜR; 2; 12	SIL; 1; 3	SIL; 2; 4	SPA; 1; 12	SPA; 2; 7	ASS; 1; 3	ASS; 2; 3	MST; 1; 10	MST; 2; 6	MST; 3; 10	ZAN; 1; 6	ZAN; 2; 5	**ZAN**; **3** C	3rd	211
2015	Manor MP Motorsport	MNZ; 1; 7	MNZ; 2; 6	SIL; 1; 4	SIL; 2; 2	RBR; 1	RBR; 2	RBR; 3	SPA; 1	SPA; 2	ASS; 1; 8	ASS; 2; 6	NÜR; 1	NÜR; 2	HOC; 1	HOC; 2	HOC; 3		14th	98

=== Complete Eurocup Formula Renault 2.0 results ===
(key) (Races in bold indicate pole position; races in italics indicate fastest lap)

Year	Entrant	1	2	3	4	5	6	7	8	9	10	11	12	13	14	15	16	17	DC	Points
2014	Prema Powerteam	ALC; 1; 13	ALC; 2; 8	SPA; 1; 1	SPA; 2; 2	MSC; 1; 9	MSC; 2; 5	NÜR; 1; 4	**NÜR**; **2**; 1	HUN; 1; 9	HUN; 2; 8	LEC; 1; 6	LEC; 2 Ret	**JER**; **1** DSQ	JER; 2; 7				2nd	12
2015	Manor MP Motorsport	ALC; 1; 6	ALC; 2; 3	**ALC**; **3**; 1	SPA; 1; 10	SPA; 2; 29	HUN; 1; 14	HUN; 2; 13	SIL; 1; 6	SIL; 2; 6	SIL; 3; 8	NÜR; 1; 10	NÜR; 2 Ret	LMS; 1; 7	LMS; 2; 2	JER; 1; 21	JER; 2; 8	JER; 3; 10	8th	101

=== Complete Porsche Supercup results ===
(key) (Races in bold indicate pole position) (Races in italics indicate fastest lap)

Year	Team	1	2	3	4	5	6	7	8	9	10	11	Pos.	Points
2016	Lechner MSG Racing Team	CAT	MON; 11	RBR	SIL								18th	10
2016	MRS GT-Racing					HUN; 6	HOC	SPA	MNZ	USA	USA		18th	10
2017	Walter Lechner Racing Team	CAT; 2	CAT; 2	MON; 3	RBR; 5	**SIL**; 1	HUN; 2	**SPA**; 1	**SPA**; 1	MNZ; 5	**MEX**; 3	MEX; 3	2nd	186

=== Complete European Le Mans Series results ===
Year	Entrant	Class	Chassis	Engine	1	2	3	4	5	6	Rank	Points
2018	Proton Competition	LMGTE	Porsche 911 RSR	Porsche 4.0 L Flat-6	LEC; 5	MNZ	RBR; 4	**SIL**; 4	SPA; 5‡	ALG; 1	6th	65

^{‡} Half points awarded as less than 75% of race distance was completed.

=== Complete 24 Hours of Nürburgring results ===
Year	Team	Co-Drivers	Car	Class	Laps	Pos.	Class Pos.
2018	(Germany) Manthey Racing	(Switzerland) Philipp Frommenwiler (Germany) Lars Kern (Germany) Otto Klohs	Porsche 911 GT3 R	SP9	129	18th	17th
2019	(Germany) Manthey Racing	(Italy) Matteo Cairoli (Germany) Lars Kern (Germany) Otto Klohs	Porsche 911 GT3 R	SP9	155	4th	4th
2020	(Hong Kong) KCMG	(New Zealand) Earl Bamber (Germany) Jörg Bergmeister (Germany) Timo Bernhard	Porsche 911 GT3 R	SP9	83	13th	13th
2021	(Germany) Frikadelli Racing Team	(France) Frédéric Makowiecki (Belgium) Maxime Martin (France) Patrick Pilet	Porsche 911 GT3 R	SP9	54	DNF	DNF
2022	(Hong Kong) KCMG	(New Zealand) Earl Bamber (United Kingdom) Nick Tandy	Porsche 911 GT3 R	SP9; Pro	149	DNF	DNF
2023	(Germany) Rutronik Racing	(France) Julien Andlauer (Italy) Matteo Cairoli	Porsche 911 GT3 R (992)	SP9; Pro	162	5th	5th
2024	(Germany) Herberth Motorsport	(Australia) Matt Campbell (Germany) Vincent Kolb (Germany) Robert Renauer	Porsche 911 GT3 R (992)	SP9; Pro	49	16th	13th
2025	(Germany) HRT Ford Performance	(India) Arjun Maini (Germany) Jusuf Owega (Germany) Frank Stippler	Ford Mustang GT3	SP9; Pro	27	DNF	DNF
2026	(Germany) HRT Ford Racing	(Germany) Christopher Mies (Germany) Frank Stippler (Belgium) Frédéric Vervisch	Ford Mustang GT3 Evo	SP9; Pro	155	7th	6th

=== Complete 24 Hours of Le Mans results ===
Year	Team	Co-Drivers	Car	Class	Laps	Pos.	Class Pos.
2019	(United States) Porsche GT Team	(France) Mathieu Jaminet (Germany) Sven Müller	Porsche 911 RSR	GTE; Pro	339	27th	7th
2021	(Germany) Team Project 1	(Norway) Anders Buchardt (United States) Robby Foley	Porsche 911 RSR-19	GTE; Am	138	DNF	DNF
2024	(Germany) Proton Competition	(Denmark) Mikkel O. Pedersen (Italy) Giorgio Roda	Ford Mustang GT3	LMGT3	280	30th	**3rd**
2025	(Germany) Proton Competition	(Italy) Stefano Gattuso (Italy) Giammarco Levorato	Ford Mustang GT3	LMGT3	46	DNF	DNF

=== Complete IMSA SportsCar Championship results ===
(key) (Races in bold indicate pole position; races in italics indicate fastest lap)

Year	Entrant	Class	Make	Engine	1	2	3	4	5	6	7	8	9	10	11	Rank	Points
2019	Pfaff Motorsports	GTD	Porsche 911 GT3 R	Porsche 4.0 L Flat-6	DAY; 16	SEB	MDO	DET	WGL	MOS	LIM; 1					33rd	73
2019	Wright Motorsports	GTD	Porsche 911 GT3 R	Porsche 4.0 L Flat-6								ELK; 8	VIR	LGA	PET	33rd	73
2020	Pfaff Motorsports	GTD	Porsche 911 GT3 R	Porsche 4.0 L Flat-6	**DAY**; 13	DAY	SEB	ELK	VIR	ATL	MDO	CLT	PET; 5	LGA	SEB	35th	44
2022	KCMG	GTD Pro	Porsche 911 GT3 R	Porsche 4.0 L Flat-6	DAY; 3	SEB	LBH	LGA	WGL	MOS	LIM	ELK	VIR	PET		24th	321
2023	Wright Motorsports	GTD	Porsche 911 GT3 R (992)	Porsche 4.2 L Flat-6	DAY; 9	SEB	LBH	LGA	WGL	MOS	LIM	ELK	VIR	IMS	PET	56th	239
2024	Proton Competition	GTD	Ford Mustang GT3	Ford Coyote 5.4 L V8	DAY; 20	SEB	LBH	LGA	WGL	MOS	ELK	VIR	IMS	PET		72nd	126
2025	Ford Multimatic Motorsports	GTD Pro	Ford Mustang GT3	Ford Coyote 5.4 L V8	DAY; 1	SEB; 6	LGA	DET	WGL	MOS	ELK	VIR	IMS	PET; 5		17th	935
2026	Ford Racing	GTD Pro	Ford Mustang GT3 Evo	Ford Coyote 5.4 L V8	DAY; 14	SEB; 6	LGA; 6	DET; 5	WGL; 3	MOS; 7	ELK; 5	VIR; 2	IMS; 1	PET; 9		6th	2821

=== Complete GT World Challenge Europe results ===
==== GT World Challenge Europe Endurance Cup ====
(key) (Races in bold indicate pole position) (Races in italics indicate fastest lap)

Year	Team	Car	Class	1	2	3	4	5	6	7	Pos.	Points
2019	Rowe Racing	Porsche 911 GT3 R	Pro	MNZ; 8	SIL; 19	LEC; 5	SPA; 6H; 10	SPA; 12H; 17	SPA; 24H; 7	CAT; Ret	12th	22
2020	GPX Racing	Porsche 911 GT3 R	Pro	IMO	**NÜR**; 19						22nd	6
2020	Frikadelli Racing Team	Porsche 911 GT3 R	Pro			SPA; 6H; 11	SPA; 12H; 9	SPA; 24H; 8	LEC		22nd	6
2021	Schnabl Engineering	Porsche 911 GT3 R	Pro	MNZ	LEC	SPA; 6H; 6	SPA; 12H; 43†	SPA; 24H; Ret	NÜR	CAT	27th	4
2022	KCMG	Porsche 911 GT3 R	Pro	IMO	LEC	SPA; 6H; 8	SPA; 12H; 6	SPA; 24H; 7	HOC	CAT	25th	12
2023	Rutronik Racing	Porsche 911 GT3 R (992)	Pro	MNZ; 10	LEC; Ret	SPA; 6H; 12	SPA; 12H; 8	SPA; 24H; 5	NÜR; 5	CAT; 3	7th	38
2024	Proton Competition	Ford Mustang GT3	Pro	LEC; 10	SPA; 6H; 40	SPA; 12H; 13	SPA; 24H; 19	NÜR; 24	MNZ; 20	JED	31st	1

=== Complete FIA World Endurance Championship results ===
(key) (Races in bold indicate pole position) (Races in italics indicate fastest lap)

Year	Entrant	Class	Car	Engine	1	2	3	4	5	6	7	8	Rank	Points
2021	Team Project 1	LMGTE Am	Porsche 911 RSR-19	Porsche 4.2 L Flat-6	SPA; WD	ALG	MNZ; 11	LMS; Ret	BHR	BHR			24th	0.5
2024	Proton Competition	LMGT3	Ford Mustang GT3	Ford Coyote 5.4 L V8	QAT; 9	IMO; Ret	SPA; 8	LMS; 3	SÃO; 13	COA; NC	FUJ; 16	BHR; Ret	15th	37
2025	Proton Competition	LMGT3	Ford Mustang GT3	Ford Coyote 5.4 L V8	QAT; 10	IMO; 16	SPA; 2	LMS; Ret	SÃO; Ret	**COA**; 8	FUJ; Ret	BHR; 10	16th	27

=== Complete Deutsche Tourenwagen Masters results ===
(key) (Races in bold indicate pole position; races in italics indicate fastest lap)

Year	Entrant	Chassis	1	2	3	4	5	6	7	8	9	10	11	12	13	14	15	16	Rank	Points
2022	SSR Performance	Porsche 911 GT3 R	ALG; 1; 5	ALG; 2; 11	LAU; 1 Ret	LAU; 2; 11	IMO; 1; 9	IMO; 2 Ret	NOR; 1; 2	NOR; 2; 5	NÜR; 1 Ret	NÜR; 2; 2^{3}	**SPA**; **1**; 1^{1}	SPA; 2; 19	RBR; 1 Ret	RBR; 2; 9	HOC; 1 Ret	HOC; 2 DNS	10th	89
2023	Manthey EMA	Porsche 911 GT3 R (992)	OSC; 1; 10	OSC; 2; 4	ZAN; 1; 16	ZAN; 2; 9	NOR; 1; 3	NOR; 2; 6	NÜR; 1; 5	NÜR; 2 Ret	LAU; 1; 12	LAU; 2; 5	SAC; 1; 7	SAC; 2 Ret	RBR; 1; 10	RBR; 2; 5	HOC; 1; 2^{2}	HOC; 2; 12	7th	129

Sporting positions
Preceded by Sven Müller	Porsche Carrera Cup Germany; Champion; 2017	Succeeded by Thomas Preining
Preceded by Robin Frijns; Stuart Leonard; Dries Vanthoor	Winner of the Bathurst 12 Hour; 2019; With: Matt Campbell & Dirk Werner	Succeeded by Jules Gounon; Jordan Pepper; Maxime Soulet
Preceded by Tristan Vautier	Intercontinental GT Challenge; Champion; 2019	Succeeded by Nicky Catsburg; Augusto Farfus
