= 2025 12 Hours of Sebring =

73rd 12 Hours of Sebring race

Sebring International Raceway

The 2025 12 Hours of Sebring (formally known as the 73rd Mobil 1 Twelve Hours of Sebring) is an endurance sports car race which was held at Sebring International Raceway near Sebring, Florida, from 12 to 15 March 2025. It was the second round of both the 2025 IMSA SportsCar Championship and the Michelin Endurance Cup.

== Background ==
=== Preview ===
International Motor Sports Association (IMSA) president John Doonan confirmed the race was part of the 2025 IMSA SportsCar Championship (IMSA SCC) in March 2024. It was the twelfth consecutive year it will be a part of the IMSA SCC, and the 73rd 12 Hours of Sebring. The 12 Hours of Sebring was the second of eleven scheduled sports car endurance races by IMSA, and the second of five races on the Michelin Endurance Cup (MEC). The race would take place at the 17-turn 3.741-mile (6.021 km) Sebring International Raceway in Sebring, Florida on March 15, 2024.

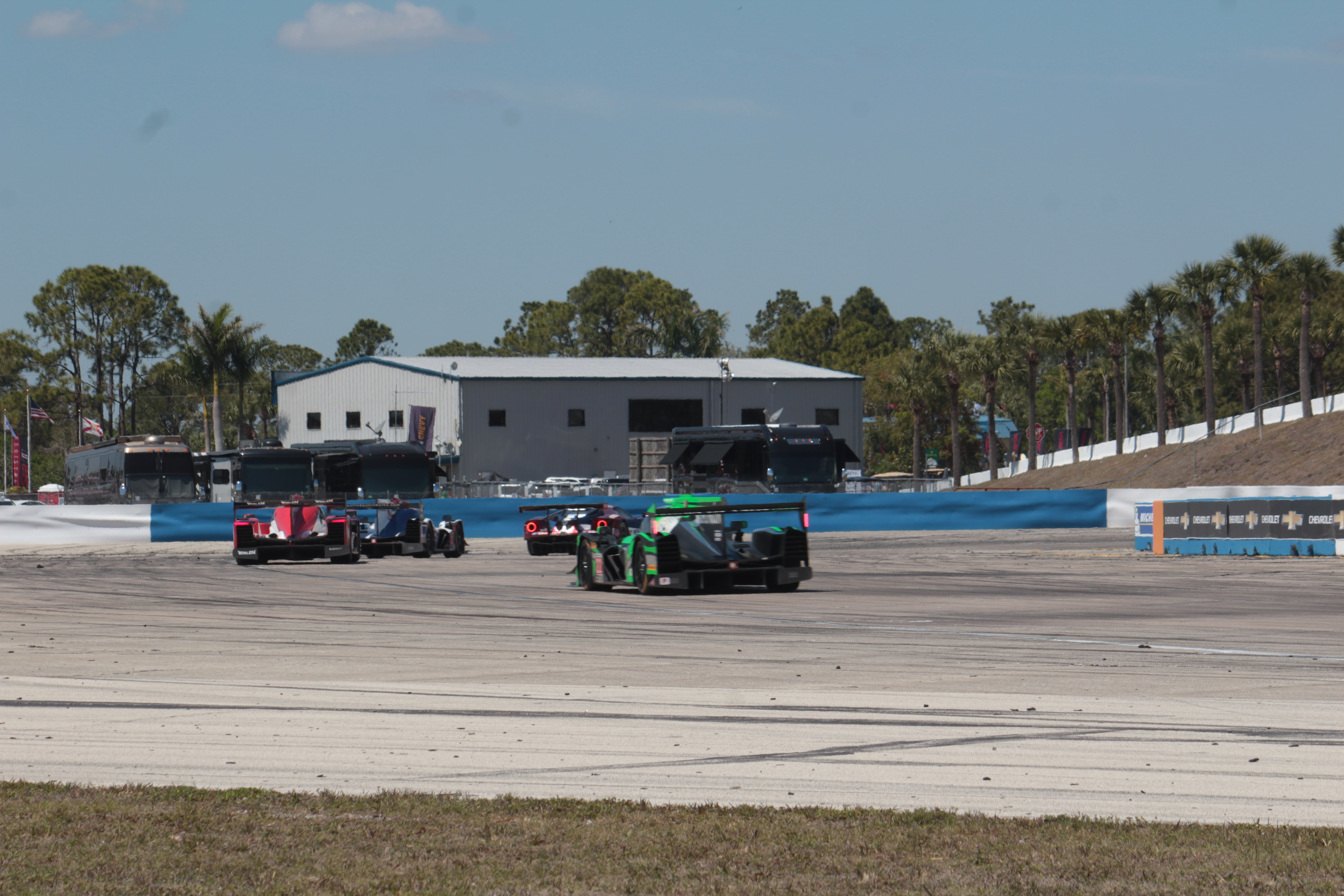
Sebring International Raceway, where the race was held.

Before the race, Felipe Nasr, Nick Tandy, and Laurens Vanthoor lead the GTP Drivers' Championship with 380 points. In LMP2, James Allen, Paul di Resta, Dan Goldburg, and Rasmus Lindh are leading the Drivers' Championship with 370 points. The GTD Pro Drivers' Championship is being led by Christopher Mies, Dennis Olsen, and Frédéric Vervisch with 376 points; 21 points ahead of Michael Christensen, Laurin Heinrich, and Sebastian Priaulx in second position. With 364 points, Matt Bell, Orey Fidani, Lars Kern, and Marvin Kirchhöfer are leading the GTD Drivers' Championship. Porsche, Ford, and Chevrolet are leading their respective Manufacturers' Championships while Porsche Penske Motorsport, United Autosports USA, Ford Multimatic Motorsports, and AWA each lead their own Teams' Championships.

== Qualifying ==
Friday's afternoon qualifying was broken into four sessions, with one session for the GTP, LMP2, GTD Pro, and GTD classes each. The rules dictated that all teams nominated a driver to qualify their cars, with the Pro-Am LMP2 class requiring a Bronze rated driver to qualify the car. The competitors' fastest lap times determined the starting order. The competitors' fastest lap times determined the starting order. IMSA then arranged the grid to put GTPs ahead of the LMP2, GTD Pro, and GTD cars.

=== Qualifying results ===
Pole positions in each class are indicated in bold and with ‡.

Pos.	Class	No.	Entry	Driver	Time	Gap	Grid
1	**GTP**	**24**	**(United States) BMW M Team RLL**	**(Belgium) Dries Vanthoor**	**1:47.091**	—	1‡
2	GTP	60	(United States) Meyer Shank Racing with Curb-Agajanian	(United Kingdom) Tom Blomqvist	1:47.116	+0.025	2
3	GTP	7	(Germany) Porsche Penske Motorsport	(Brazil) Felipe Nasr	1:47.552	+0.431	3
4	GTP	6	(Germany) Porsche Penske Motorsport	(France) Mathieu Jaminet	1:47.598	+0.507	4
5	GTP	5	(Germany) Proton Competition	(Switzerland) Neel Jani	1:48.074	+0.983	5
6	GTP	93	(United States) Meyer Shank Racing with Curb-Agajanian	(Netherlands) Renger van der Zande	1:48.108	+1.107	6
7	GTP	40	(United States) Cadillac Wayne Taylor Racing	(Switzerland) Louis Delétraz	1:48.126	+1.035	7
8	GTP	10	(United States) Cadillac Wayne Taylor Racing	(United States) Ricky Taylor	1:48.171	+1.080	8
9	GTP	85	(United States) JDC-Miller MotorSports	(Italy) Gianmaria Bruni	1:48.228	+1.137	9
10	GTP	25	(United States) BMW M Team RLL	(South Africa) Sheldon van der Linde	1:48.780	+1.689	10
11	GTP	63	(Italy) Automobili Lamborghini Squadra Corse	(France) Romain Grosjean	1:49.304	+2.213	11
12	GTP	23	(United States) Aston Martin THOR Team	(United Kingdom) Ross Gunn	1:49.400	+2.309	12
13	**LMP2**	**11**	**(France) TDS Racing**	**(United States) Steven Thomas**	**1:51.804**	**+4.713**	14‡
14	LMP2	99	(United States) AO Racing	(United States) P. J. Hyett	1:51.919	+4.828	15
15	LMP2	2	(United States) United Autosports USA	(United States) Nick Boulle	1:52.444	+5.353	16
16	LMP2	22	(United States) United Autosports USA	(United States) Dan Goldburg	1:52.604	+5.513	17
17	LMP2	18	(United States) Era Motorsport	(Canada) Tobias Lütke	152.944	+5.853	18
18	LMP2	88	(Italy) AF Corse	(Argentina) Luis Pérez Companc	1:53.196	+6.105	19
19	LMP2	52	(United States) PR1/Mathiasen Motorsports	(United States) Rodrigo Sales	1:53.400	+6.309	20
20	LMP2	04	(Portugal) CrowdStrike Racing by APR	(United States) George Kurtz	1:53.443	+6.352	21
21	LMP2	74	(United States) Riley	(United States) Gar Robinson	1:53.498	+6.407	22
22	LMP2	43	(Poland) Inter Europol Competition	(United States) Jeremy Clarke	1:53.769	+6.678	23
23	LMP2	73	(United States) Pratt Miller Motorsports	(Canada) Chris Cumming	1:53.891	+6.800	24
24	LMP2	8	(Canada) Tower Motorsports	(Canada) John Farano	1:55.877	+8.786	25
25	**GTD**	**21**	**(Italy) AF Corse**	**(Italy) Alessandro Pier Guidi**	**1:59.131**	**+12.040**	37‡
26	**GTD Pro**	**81**	**(United States) DragonSpeed**	**(Spain) Albert Costa**	**1:59.225**	**+12.134**	26‡
27	GTD Pro	77	(United States) AO Racing	(Germany) Laurin Heinrich	1:59.397	+12.306	27
28	GTD	32	(United States) Korthoff Competition Motors	(United States) Kenton Koch	1:59.513	+12.422	38
29	GTD	12	(United States) Vasser Sullivan Racing	(United Kingdom) Jack Hawksworth	1:59.518	+12.427	39
30	GTD Pro	1	(United States) Paul Miller Racing	(United States) Neil Verhagen	1:59.666	+12.575	28
31	GTD	57	(United States) Winward Racing	(Switzerland) Philip Ellis	1:59.684	+12.593	40
32	GTD Pro	48	(United States) Paul Miller Racing	(United Kingdom) Dan Harper	1:59.768	+12.677	29
33	GTD Pro	3	(United States) Corvette Racing by Pratt Miller Motorsports	(Spain) Antonio García	1:59.768	+12.806	30
34	GTD Pro	4	(United States) Corvette Racing by Pratt Miller Motorsports	(United States) Tommy Milner	1:59.897	+12.835	31
35	GTD	47	(Italy) Cetilar Racing	(Italy) Lorenzo Patrese	2:00.048	+12.957	41
36	GTD	27	(United States) Heart of Racing Team	(Canada) Zacharie Robichon	2:00.061	+12.970	42
37	GTD	78	(United States) Forte Racing	(Germany) Mario Farnbacher	2:00.226	+13.135	43
38	GTD Pro	14	(United States) Vasser Sullivan Racing	(United States) Aaron Telitz	2:00.227	+13.136	32
39	GTD	021	(United States) Triarsi Competizione	(United States) Mike Skeen	2:00.258	+13.167	44
40	GTD Pro	9	(Canada) Pfaff Motorsports	(Italy) Andrea Caldarelli	2:00.493	+13.402	33
41	GTD Pro	64	(Canada) Ford Multimatic Motorsports	(United Kingdom) Sebastian Priaulx	2:00.533	+13.442	34
42	GTD Pro	65	(Canada) Ford Multimatic Motorsports	(Germany) Christopher Mies	2:00.614	+13.523	35
43	GTD	34	(United States) Conquest Racing	(United States) Manny Franco	2:00.734	+13.643	45
44	GTD	96	(United States) Turner Motorsport	(United States) Robby Foley	2:00.782	+13.691	46
45	GTD Pro	20	(Germany) Proton Competition	(Austria) Richard Lietz	2:00.814	+13.723	36
46	GTD	83	(Italy) Iron Dames	(Denmark) Michelle Gatting	2:00.843	+13.752	47
47	GTD	023	(United States) Triarsi Competizione	(United States) Charlie Scardina	2:00.946	+13.855	48
48	GTD	120	(United States) Wright Motorsports	(United States) Adam Adelson	2:01.206	+14.115	49
49	GTD	80	(United States) Lone Star Racing	(United States) Dan Knox	2:01.728	+14.637	50
50	GTD	36	(United States) DXDT Racing	(Turkey) Salih Yoluç	2:01.814	+14.723	51
51	GTD	19	(United States) van der Steur Racing	(United States) Anthony McIntosh	2:01.983	+14.892	52
52	GTD	13	(Canada) AWA	(Canada) Orey Fidani	2:02.274	+15.183	53
53	GTD	66	(United States) Gradient Racing	(United Kingdom) Till Bechtolsheimer	2:02.435	+15.344	54
54	GTD	45	(United States) Wayne Taylor Racing	(United States) Trent Hindman	2:02.786	+15.695	55
55	GTP	31	(United States) Cadillac Whelen	No Time Established			13
56	GTD	70	(United Kingdom) Inception Racing	No Time Established			56

== Race ==
=== Post-race ===
With a total of 760 points, Nasr, Tandy, and Vanthoor's victory allowed them to extend their advantage in the GTP Drivers' Championship while Campbell, Estre, and Jaminet took over second place. Allen, di Resta, Goldburg, and Lindh led the LMP2 point standings, ahead of Fraga, Massa, Robinson, and Burdon. The final results of GTD Pro kept Mies, Olsen, and Versich atop GTD Pro Drivers' Championship with 653 points. Bachler, Heinrich, and Picariello advanced from to second. As a result of winning the race, Dontje, Ellis, and Ward advanced from fourth to first in the GTD Drivers' Championship. Porsche Penske Motorsport and Ford Multimatic Motorsports continued to top their respective Teams' Championships while Riley and Winward Racing became the leaders of their Teams' Championships. Porsche and Ford continued to top their respective Manufacturers' Championships while Mercedes-AMG took the lead of the GTD Manufacturers' Championship with 9 rounds remaining in the season.

=== Race results ===
Class winners are denoted in bold and with ‡.

Pos	Class	No	Team	Drivers	Chassis	Laps	Time/Retired
Pos	Class	No	Team	Drivers	Engine	Laps	Time/Retired
1	**GTP**	**7**	**(Germany) Porsche Penske Motorsport**	**(Brazil) Felipe Nasr (United Kingdom) Nick Tandy (Belgium) Laurens Vanthoor**	**Porsche 963**	**353**	**12:01:23.265‡**
1	**GTP**	**7**	**(Germany) Porsche Penske Motorsport**	**(Brazil) Felipe Nasr (United Kingdom) Nick Tandy (Belgium) Laurens Vanthoor**	**Porsche 9RD 4.6 L twin-turbo V8**	**353**	**12:01:23.265‡**
2	GTP	6	(Germany) Porsche Penske Motorsport	(Australia) Matt Campbell (France) Kévin Estre (France) Mathieu Jaminet	Porsche 963	353	+2.239
2	GTP	6	(Germany) Porsche Penske Motorsport	(Australia) Matt Campbell (France) Kévin Estre (France) Mathieu Jaminet	Porsche 9RD 4.6 L twin-turbo V8	353	+2.239
3	GTP	93	(United States) Meyer Shank Racing with Curb-Agajanian	(Spain) Álex Palou (Netherlands) Renger van der Zande (United Kingdom) Nick Yelloly	Acura ARX-06	353	+5.017
3	GTP	93	(United States) Meyer Shank Racing with Curb-Agajanian	(Spain) Álex Palou (Netherlands) Renger van der Zande (United Kingdom) Nick Yelloly	Acura AR24e 2.4 L twin-turbo V6	353	+5.017
4	GTP	31	(United States) Cadillac Whelen	(United Kingdom) Jack Aitken (New Zealand) Earl Bamber (Denmark) Frederik Vesti	Cadillac V-Series.R	353	+12.661
4	GTP	31	(United States) Cadillac Whelen	(United Kingdom) Jack Aitken (New Zealand) Earl Bamber (Denmark) Frederik Vesti	Cadillac LMC55R 5.5 L V8	353	+12.661
5	GTP	25	(United States) BMW M Team RLL	(Netherlands) Robin Frijns (South Africa) Sheldon van der Linde (Germany) Marco Wittmann	BMW M Hybrid V8	353	+19.257
5	GTP	25	(United States) BMW M Team RLL	(Netherlands) Robin Frijns (South Africa) Sheldon van der Linde (Germany) Marco Wittmann	BMW P66/3 4.0 L twin-turbo V8	353	+19.257
6	GTP	5	(Germany) Proton Competition	(Switzerland) Neel Jani (Chile) Nico Pino (France) Tristan Vautier	Porsche 963	353	+1:02.670
6	GTP	5	(Germany) Proton Competition	(Switzerland) Neel Jani (Chile) Nico Pino (France) Tristan Vautier	Porsche 9RD 4.6 L twin-turbo V8	353	+1:02.670
7	GTP	10	(United States) Cadillac Wayne Taylor Racing	(Portugal) Filipe Albuquerque (United Kingdom) Will Stevens (United States) Ricky Taylor	Cadillac V-Series.R	352	+1 Lap
7	GTP	10	(United States) Cadillac Wayne Taylor Racing	(Portugal) Filipe Albuquerque (United Kingdom) Will Stevens (United States) Ricky Taylor	Cadillac LMC55R 5.5 L V8	352	+1 Lap
8	GTP	85	(United States) JDC-Miller MotorSports	(Italy) Gianmaria Bruni (Switzerland) Nico Müller (Netherlands) Tijmen van der Helm	Porsche 963	352	+1 Lap
8	GTP	85	(United States) JDC-Miller MotorSports	(Italy) Gianmaria Bruni (Switzerland) Nico Müller (Netherlands) Tijmen van der Helm	Porsche 9RD 4.6 L twin-turbo V8	352	+1 Lap
9	GTP	23	(United States) Aston Martin THOR Team	(Canada) Roman De Angelis (United Kingdom) Ross Gunn (Spain) Alex Riberas	Aston Martin Valkyrie	351	+2 Laps
9	GTP	23	(United States) Aston Martin THOR Team	(Canada) Roman De Angelis (United Kingdom) Ross Gunn (Spain) Alex Riberas	Aston Martin RA 6.5 L V12	351	+2 Laps
10	GTP	60	(United States) Meyer Shank Racing with Curb-Agajanian	(United Kingdom) Tom Blomqvist (United States) Colin Braun (New Zealand) Scott Dixon	Acura ARX-06	348	+5 Laps
10	GTP	60	(United States) Meyer Shank Racing with Curb-Agajanian	(United Kingdom) Tom Blomqvist (United States) Colin Braun (New Zealand) Scott Dixon	Acura AR24e 2.4 L twin-turbo V6	348	+5 Laps
11	**LMP2**	**43**	**(Poland) Inter Europol Competition**	**(United States) Jeremy Clarke (France) Tom Dillmann (United States) Bijoy Garg**	**Oreca 07**	**347**	**+6 Laps‡**
11	**LMP2**	**43**	**(Poland) Inter Europol Competition**	**(United States) Jeremy Clarke (France) Tom Dillmann (United States) Bijoy Garg**	**Gibson GK428 4.2 L V8**	**347**	**+6 Laps‡**
12	LMP2	8	(Canada) Tower Motorsports	(Mexico) Sebastián Álvarez (France) Sébastien Bourdais (Canada) John Farano	Oreca 07	347	+6 Laps
12	LMP2	8	(Canada) Tower Motorsports	(Mexico) Sebastián Álvarez (France) Sébastien Bourdais (Canada) John Farano	Gibson GK428 4.2 L V8	347	+6 Laps
13	LMP2	11	(France) TDS Racing	(Denmark) Mikkel Jensen (New Zealand) Hunter McElrea (United States) Steven Thomas	Oreca 07	347	+6 Laps
13	LMP2	11	(France) TDS Racing	(Denmark) Mikkel Jensen (New Zealand) Hunter McElrea (United States) Steven Thomas	Gibson GK428 4.2 L V8	347	+6 Laps
14	LMP2	74	(United States) Riley	(Australia) Josh Burdon (Brazil) Felipe Fraga (United States) Gar Robinson	Oreca 07	347	+6 Laps
14	LMP2	74	(United States) Riley	(Australia) Josh Burdon (Brazil) Felipe Fraga (United States) Gar Robinson	Gibson GK428 4.2 L V8	347	+6 Laps
15	LMP2	2	(United States) United Autosports USA	(United States) Nick Boulle (United States) Juan Manuel Correa (United Kingdom) Ben Hanley	Oreca 07	347	+6 Laps
15	LMP2	2	(United States) United Autosports USA	(United States) Nick Boulle (United States) Juan Manuel Correa (United Kingdom) Ben Hanley	Gibson GK428 4.2 L V8	347	+6 Laps
16	LMP2	04	(Portugal) CrowdStrike Racing by APR	(Denmark) Malthe Jakobsen (United States) George Kurtz (United Kingdom) Toby Sowery	Oreca 07	347	+6 Laps
16	LMP2	04	(Portugal) CrowdStrike Racing by APR	(Denmark) Malthe Jakobsen (United States) George Kurtz (United Kingdom) Toby Sowery	Gibson GK428 4.2 L V8	347	+6 Laps
17	LMP2	99	(United States) AO Racing	(United States) Dane Cameron (United Kingdom) Jonny Edgar (United States) P. J. Hyett	Oreca 07	346	+7 Laps
17	LMP2	99	(United States) AO Racing	(United States) Dane Cameron (United Kingdom) Jonny Edgar (United States) P. J. Hyett	Gibson GK428 4.2 L V8	346	+7 Laps
18 DNF	GTP	40	(United States) Cadillac Wayne Taylor Racing	(Switzerland) Louis Delétraz (New Zealand) Brendon Hartley (United States) Jordan Taylor	Cadillac V-Series.R	345	Accident damage
18 DNF	GTP	40	(United States) Cadillac Wayne Taylor Racing	(Switzerland) Louis Delétraz (New Zealand) Brendon Hartley (United States) Jordan Taylor	Cadillac LMC55R 5.5 L V8	345	Accident damage
19	LMP2	22	(United States) United Autosports USA	(United Kingdom) Paul di Resta (United States) Dan Goldburg (Sweden) Rasmus Lindh	Oreca 07	342	+11 Laps
19	LMP2	22	(United States) United Autosports USA	(United Kingdom) Paul di Resta (United States) Dan Goldburg (Sweden) Rasmus Lindh	Gibson GK428 4.2 L V8	342	+11 Laps
20	**GTD Pro**	**77**	**(United States) AO Racing**	**(Austria) Klaus Bachler (Germany) Laurin Heinrich (Belgium) Alessio Picariello**	**Porsche 911 GT3 R (992)**	**329**	**+24 Laps‡**
20	**GTD Pro**	**77**	**(United States) AO Racing**	**(Austria) Klaus Bachler (Germany) Laurin Heinrich (Belgium) Alessio Picariello**	**Porsche M97/80 4.2 L Flat-6**	**329**	**+24 Laps‡**
21	GTD Pro	48	(United States) Paul Miller Racing	(United Kingdom) Dan Harper (Germany) Max Hesse (Finland) Jesse Krohn	BMW M4 GT3 Evo	329	+24 Laps
21	GTD Pro	48	(United States) Paul Miller Racing	(United Kingdom) Dan Harper (Germany) Max Hesse (Finland) Jesse Krohn	BMW P58 3.0 L Twin-turbo I6	329	+24 Laps
22	GTD Pro	1	(United States) Paul Miller Racing	(United States) Connor De Phillippi (United States) Madison Snow (United States) Neil Verhagen	BMW M4 GT3 Evo	329	+24 Laps
22	GTD Pro	1	(United States) Paul Miller Racing	(United States) Connor De Phillippi (United States) Madison Snow (United States) Neil Verhagen	BMW P58 3.0 L Twin-turbo I6	329	+24 Laps
23	GTD Pro	81	(United States) DragonSpeed	(Italy) Giacomo Altoè (Spain) Albert Costa (Italy) Davide Rigon	Ferrari 296 GT3	329	+24 Laps
23	GTD Pro	81	(United States) DragonSpeed	(Italy) Giacomo Altoè (Spain) Albert Costa (Italy) Davide Rigon	Ferrari F163CE 3.0 L Turbo V6	329	+24 Laps
24	GTD Pro	64	(Canada) Ford Multimatic Motorsports	(United Kingdom) Ben Barker (United Kingdom) Sebastian Priaulx (Germany) Mike Rockenfeller	Ford Mustang GT3	329	+24 Laps
24	GTD Pro	64	(Canada) Ford Multimatic Motorsports	(United Kingdom) Ben Barker (United Kingdom) Sebastian Priaulx (Germany) Mike Rockenfeller	Ford Coyote 5.4 L V8	329	+24 Laps
25	GTD Pro	65	(Canada) Ford Multimatic Motorsports	(Germany) Christopher Mies (Norway) Dennis Olsen (Belgium) Frédéric Vervisch	Ford Mustang GT3	329	+24 Laps
25	GTD Pro	65	(Canada) Ford Multimatic Motorsports	(Germany) Christopher Mies (Norway) Dennis Olsen (Belgium) Frédéric Vervisch	Ford Coyote 5.4 L V8	329	+24 Laps
26	GTD Pro	3	(United States) Corvette Racing by Pratt Miller Motorsports	(Spain) Antonio García (Spain) Daniel Juncadella (United Kingdom) Alexander Sims	Chevrolet Corvette Z06 GT3.R	328	+25 Laps
26	GTD Pro	3	(United States) Corvette Racing by Pratt Miller Motorsports	(Spain) Antonio García (Spain) Daniel Juncadella (United Kingdom) Alexander Sims	Chevrolet LT6.R 5.5 L V8	328	+25 Laps
27	GTD Pro	20	(Germany) Proton Competition	(Italy) Matteo Cressoni (Austria) Richard Lietz (Italy) Claudio Schiavoni	Porsche 911 GT3 R (992)	327	+26 Laps
27	GTD Pro	20	(Germany) Proton Competition	(Italy) Matteo Cressoni (Austria) Richard Lietz (Italy) Claudio Schiavoni	Porsche M97/80 4.2 L Flat-6	327	+26 Laps
28	**GTD**	**57**	**(United States) Winward Racing**	**(Netherlands) Indy Dontje (Switzerland) Philip Ellis (United States) Russell Ward**	**Mercedes-AMG GT3 Evo**	**327**	**+26 Laps‡**
28	**GTD**	**57**	**(United States) Winward Racing**	**(Netherlands) Indy Dontje (Switzerland) Philip Ellis (United States) Russell Ward**	**Mercedes-Benz M159 6.2 L V8**	**327**	**+26 Laps‡**
29	GTD	12	(United States) Vasser Sullivan Racing	(United Kingdom) Jack Hawksworth (United States) Frankie Montecalvo (Canada) Parker Thompson	Lexus RC F GT3	327	+26 Laps
29	GTD	12	(United States) Vasser Sullivan Racing	(United Kingdom) Jack Hawksworth (United States) Frankie Montecalvo (Canada) Parker Thompson	Toyota 2UR-GSE 5.4 L V8	327	+26 Laps
30	GTD	27	(United States) Heart of Racing Team	(United Kingdom) Tom Gamble (Canada) Zacharie Robichon (United Kingdom) Casper Stevenson	Aston Martin Vantage AMR GT3 Evo	327	+26 Laps
30	GTD	27	(United States) Heart of Racing Team	(United Kingdom) Tom Gamble (Canada) Zacharie Robichon (United Kingdom) Casper Stevenson	Aston Martin M177 4.0 L Turbo V8	327	+26 Laps
31	GTD	70	(United Kingdom) Inception Racing	(United States) Brendan Iribe (United Kingdom) Ollie Millroy (Denmark) Frederik Schandorff	Ferrari 296 GT3	327	+26 Laps
31	GTD	70	(United Kingdom) Inception Racing	(United States) Brendan Iribe (United Kingdom) Ollie Millroy (Denmark) Frederik Schandorff	Ferrari F163CE 3.0 L Turbo V6	327	+26 Laps
32	GTD	120	(United States) Wright Motorsports	(United States) Adam Adelson (Australia) Tom Sargent (United States) Elliott Skeer	Porsche 911 GT3 R (992)	326	+27 Laps
32	GTD	120	(United States) Wright Motorsports	(United States) Adam Adelson (Australia) Tom Sargent (United States) Elliott Skeer	Porsche M97/80 4.2 L Flat-6	326	+27 Laps
33	GTD	96	(United States) Turner Motorsport	(United States) Robby Foley (United States) Patrick Gallagher (United States) Jake Walker	BMW M4 GT3 Evo	326	+27 Laps
33	GTD	96	(United States) Turner Motorsport	(United States) Robby Foley (United States) Patrick Gallagher (United States) Jake Walker	BMW P58 3.0 L Twin-turbo I6	326	+27 Laps
34	GTD	34	(United States) Conquest Racing	(United States) Manny Franco (Monaco) Cédric Sbirrazzuoli (Brazil) Daniel Serra	Ferrari 296 GT3	326	+27 Laps
34	GTD	34	(United States) Conquest Racing	(United States) Manny Franco (Monaco) Cédric Sbirrazzuoli (Brazil) Daniel Serra	Ferrari F163CE 3.0 L Turbo V6	326	+27 Laps
35	GTD	36	(United States) DXDT Racing	(Republic of Ireland) Charlie Eastwood (United States) Alec Udell (Turkey) Salih Yoluç	Chevrolet Corvette Z06 GT3.R	326	+27 Laps
35	GTD	36	(United States) DXDT Racing	(Republic of Ireland) Charlie Eastwood (United States) Alec Udell (Turkey) Salih Yoluç	Chevrolet LT6.R 5.5 L V8	326	+27 Laps
36	GTD Pro	4	(United States) Corvette Racing by Pratt Miller Motorsports	(Netherlands) Nicky Catsburg (United States) Tommy Milner (Argentina) Nicolás Varrone	Chevrolet Corvette Z06 GT3.R	325	+28 Laps
36	GTD Pro	4	(United States) Corvette Racing by Pratt Miller Motorsports	(Netherlands) Nicky Catsburg (United States) Tommy Milner (Argentina) Nicolás Varrone	Chevrolet LT6.R 5.5 L V8	325	+28 Laps
37	GTD Pro	9	(Canada) Pfaff Motorsports	(Italy) Andrea Caldarelli (Canada) James Hinchcliffe (Italy) Marco Mapelli	Lamborghini Huracán GT3 Evo 2	325	+28 Laps
37	GTD Pro	9	(Canada) Pfaff Motorsports	(Italy) Andrea Caldarelli (Canada) James Hinchcliffe (Italy) Marco Mapelli	Lamborghini DGF 5.2 L V10	325	+28 Laps
38	GTD	80	(United States) Lone Star Racing	(Australia) Scott Andrews (United States) Eric Filgueiras (United States) Dan Knox	Mercedes-AMG GT3 Evo	325	+28 Laps
38	GTD	80	(United States) Lone Star Racing	(Australia) Scott Andrews (United States) Eric Filgueiras (United States) Dan Knox	Mercedes-Benz M159 6.2 L V8	325	+28 Laps
39	GTD	13	(Canada) AWA	(United Kingdom) Matt Bell (Canada) Orey Fidani (Germany) Lars Kern	Chevrolet Corvette Z06 GT3.R	325	+28 Laps
39	GTD	13	(Canada) AWA	(United Kingdom) Matt Bell (Canada) Orey Fidani (Germany) Lars Kern	Chevrolet LT6.R 5.5 L V8	325	+28 Laps
40	GTD	83	(Italy) Iron Dames	(Belgium) Sarah Bovy (Switzerland) Rahel Frey (Denmark) Michelle Gatting	Porsche 911 GT3 R (992)	325	+28 Laps
40	GTD	83	(Italy) Iron Dames	(Belgium) Sarah Bovy (Switzerland) Rahel Frey (Denmark) Michelle Gatting	Porsche M97/80 4.2 L Flat-6	325	+28 Laps
41	GTD	78	(United States) Forte Racing	(Germany) Mario Farnbacher (Canada) Misha Goikhberg (United States) Parker Kligerman	Lamborghini Huracán GT3 Evo 2	323	+30 Laps
41	GTD	78	(United States) Forte Racing	(Germany) Mario Farnbacher (Canada) Misha Goikhberg (United States) Parker Kligerman	Lamborghini DGF 5.2 L V10	323	+30 Laps
42	GTD	66	(United States) Gradient Racing	(United Kingdom) Till Bechtolsheimer (Colombia) Tatiana Calderón (United States) Joey Hand	Ford Mustang GT3	322	+31 Laps
42	GTD	66	(United States) Gradient Racing	(United Kingdom) Till Bechtolsheimer (Colombia) Tatiana Calderón (United States) Joey Hand	Ford Coyote 5.4 L V8	322	+31 Laps
43	GTD	45	(United States) Wayne Taylor Racing	(United States) Graham Doyle (Costa Rica) Danny Formal (United States) Trent Hindman	Lamborghini Huracán GT3 Evo 2	322	+31 Laps
43	GTD	45	(United States) Wayne Taylor Racing	(United States) Graham Doyle (Costa Rica) Danny Formal (United States) Trent Hindman	Lamborghini DGF 5.2 L V10	322	+31 Laps
44	GTP	24	(United States) BMW M Team RLL	(Austria) Philipp Eng (Denmark) Kevin Magnussen (Belgium) Dries Vanthoor	BMW M Hybrid V8	322	+31 Laps
44	GTP	24	(United States) BMW M Team RLL	(Austria) Philipp Eng (Denmark) Kevin Magnussen (Belgium) Dries Vanthoor	BMW P66/3 4.0 L twin-turbo V8	322	+31 Laps
45 DNF	LMP2	52	(United States) PR1/Mathiasen Motorsports	(Switzerland) Mathias Beche (Denmark) Benjamin Pedersen (United States) Rodrigo Sales	Oreca 07	321	Overheating
45 DNF	LMP2	52	(United States) PR1/Mathiasen Motorsports	(Switzerland) Mathias Beche (Denmark) Benjamin Pedersen (United States) Rodrigo Sales	Gibson GK428 4.2 L V8	321	Overheating
46 DNF	GTD	021	(United States) Triarsi Competizione	(United Kingdom) Stevan McAleer (United States) Sheena Monk (United States) Mike Skeen	Ferrari 296 GT3	293	Electrical
46 DNF	GTD	021	(United States) Triarsi Competizione	(United Kingdom) Stevan McAleer (United States) Sheena Monk (United States) Mike Skeen	Ferrari F163CE 3.0 L Turbo V6	293	Electrical
47 DNF	LMP2	88	(Italy) AF Corse	(Denmark) Nicklas Nielsen (Argentina) Luis Pérez Companc (Argentina) Matías Pérez Companc	Oreca 07	260	Accident
47 DNF	LMP2	88	(Italy) AF Corse	(Denmark) Nicklas Nielsen (Argentina) Luis Pérez Companc (Argentina) Matías Pérez Companc	Gibson GK428 4.2 L V8	260	Accident
48 DNF	GTP	63	(Italy) Automobili Lamborghini Squadra Corse	(Italy) Mirko Bortolotti (France) Romain Grosjean; Daniil Kvyat	Lamborghini SC63	256	Mechanical
48 DNF	GTP	63	(Italy) Automobili Lamborghini Squadra Corse	(Italy) Mirko Bortolotti (France) Romain Grosjean; Daniil Kvyat	Lamborghini 3.8 L Turbo V8	256	Mechanical
49 DNF	GTD Pro	14	(United States) Vasser Sullivan Racing	(United States) Kyle Kirkwood (Argentina) José María López (United States) Aaron Telitz	Lexus RC F GT3	255	Suspension
49 DNF	GTD Pro	14	(United States) Vasser Sullivan Racing	(United States) Kyle Kirkwood (Argentina) José María López (United States) Aaron Telitz	Toyota 2UR-GSE 5.4 L V8	255	Suspension
50 DNF	GTD	21	(Italy) AF Corse	(United States) Simon Mann (Italy) Alessandro Pier Guidi (France) Lilou Wadoux	Ferrari 296 GT3	255	Engine
50 DNF	GTD	21	(Italy) AF Corse	(United States) Simon Mann (Italy) Alessandro Pier Guidi (France) Lilou Wadoux	Ferrari F163CE 3.0 L Turbo V6	255	Engine
51 DNF	GTD	19	(United States) van der Steur Racing	(France) Valentin Hasse-Clot (United States) Anthony McIntosh (United States) Rory van der Steur	Aston Martin Vantage AMR GT3 Evo	198	Energy system
51 DNF	GTD	19	(United States) van der Steur Racing	(France) Valentin Hasse-Clot (United States) Anthony McIntosh (United States) Rory van der Steur	Aston Martin M177 4.0 L Turbo V8	198	Energy system
52 DNF	GTD	32	(United States) Korthoff Competition Motors	(Germany) Maximilian Götz (United States) Kenton Koch (United States) Seth Lucas	Mercedes-AMG GT3 Evo	183	Engine
52 DNF	GTD	32	(United States) Korthoff Competition Motors	(Germany) Maximilian Götz (United States) Kenton Koch (United States) Seth Lucas	Mercedes-Benz M159 6.2 L V8	183	Engine
53 DNF	LMP2	73	(United States) Pratt Miller Motorsports	(Canada) Chris Cumming (Brazil) Pietro Fittipaldi (Republic of Ireland) James Roe	Oreca 07	144	Oil leak
53 DNF	LMP2	73	(United States) Pratt Miller Motorsports	(Canada) Chris Cumming (Brazil) Pietro Fittipaldi (Republic of Ireland) James Roe	Gibson GK428 4.2 L V8	144	Oil leak
54 DNF	GTD	47	(Italy) Cetilar Racing	(Italy) Antonio Fuoco (Italy) Lorenzo Patrese (Italy) Giorgio Sernagiotto	Ferrari 296 GT3	52	Mechanical
54 DNF	GTD	47	(Italy) Cetilar Racing	(Italy) Antonio Fuoco (Italy) Lorenzo Patrese (Italy) Giorgio Sernagiotto	Ferrari F163CE 3.0 L Turbo V6	52	Mechanical
55 DNF	LMP2	18	(United States) Era Motorsport	(Denmark) David Heinemeier Hansson (Canada) Tobias Lütke (Japan) Kakunoshin Ohta	Oreca 07	37	Accident
55 DNF	LMP2	18	(United States) Era Motorsport	(Denmark) David Heinemeier Hansson (Canada) Tobias Lütke (Japan) Kakunoshin Ohta	Gibson GK428 4.2 L V8	37	Accident
56 DNF	GTD	023	(United States) Triarsi Competizione	(Italy) Alessio Rovera (United States) Charlie Scardina (United States) Onofrio Triarsi	Ferrari 296 GT3	24	Accident
56 DNF	GTD	023	(United States) Triarsi Competizione	(Italy) Alessio Rovera (United States) Charlie Scardina (United States) Onofrio Triarsi	Ferrari F163CE 3.0 L Turbo V6	24	Accident
Provisional results

== Standings after the race ==
GTP Drivers' Championship standings
Pos.	+/–	Driver	Points
1		(Brazil) Felipe Nasr (United Kingdom) Nick Tandy (Belgium) Laurens Vanthoor	760
2	1	(France) Kévin Estre (France) Mathieu Jaminet (Australia) Matt Campbell	669
3	1	(United Kingdom) Tom Blomqvist (United States) Colin Braun (New Zealand) Scott Dixon	587
4	3	(United Kingdom) Nick Yelloly (Netherlands) Renger van der Zande (Spain) Álex Palou	587
5		(Portugal) Filipe Albuquerque (United States) Ricky Taylor (United Kingdom) Will Stevens	547

LMP2 Drivers' Championship standings
Pos.	+/–	Driver	Points
1	1	(Brazil) Felipe Fraga (United States) Gar Robinson (Australia) Josh Burdon	645
2	1	(United States) Dan Goldburg (United Kingdom) Paul di Resta (Sweden) Rasmus Lindh	643
3	7	(United States) Bijoy Garg (France) Tom Dillmann	602
4	4	(United States) Steven Thomas (New Zealand) Hunter McElrea (Denmark) Mikkel Jensen	591
5	2	(Denmark) Benjamin Pedersen (Switzerland) Mathias Beche (United States) Rodrigo Sales	576

GTD Pro Drivers' Championship standings
Pos.	+/–	Driver	Points
1		(Germany) Christopher Mies (Norway) Dennis Olsen (Belgium) Frédéric Vervisch	653
2	6	(Austria) Klaus Bachler (Germany) Laurin Heinrich (Belgium) Alessio Picariello	636
3	1	(United States) Connor De Phillippi (United States) Madison Snow (United States) Neil Verhagen	628
4	1	(United Kingdom) Sebastian Priaulx (Germany) Mike Rockenfeller	617
5	3	(Spain) Antonio García (Spain) Daniel Juncadella (United Kingdom) Alexander Sims	614

GTD Drivers' Championship standings
Pos.	+/–	Driver	Points
1	3	(Netherlands) Indy Dontje (Switzerland) Philip Ellis (United States) Russell Ward	690
2	1	(United Kingdom) Tom Gamble (Canada) Zacharie Robichon (United Kingdom) Casper Stevenson	649
3	1	(United States) Adam Adelson (Australia) Tom Sargent (United States) Elliott Skeer	633
4	3	(United Kingdom) Matt Bell (Canada) Orey Fidani (Germany) Lars Kern	590
5		(United States) Robby Foley (United States) Patrick Gallagher (United States) Jake Walker	549

Note: Only the top five positions are included for all sets of standings.

GTP Teams' Championship standings
Pos.	+/–	Team	Points
1		(Germany) #7 Porsche Penske Motorsport	760
2	1	(Germany) #6 Porsche Penske Motorsport	669
3	1	(United States) #60 Acura Meyer Shank Racing w/ Curb-Agajanian	587
4	3	(United States) #93 Acura Meyer Shank Racing w/ Curb-Agajanian	587
5		(United States) #10 Cadillac Wayne Taylor Racing	546

LMP2 Teams' Championship standings
Pos.	+/–	Team	Points
1	1	(United States) #74 Riley	645
2	1	(United States) #22 United Autosports USA	643
3	7	(Poland) #43Inter Europol Competition	602
4	4	(France) #11 TDS Racing	591
5	2	(United States) #52 PR1/Mathiasen Motorsports	576

GTD Pro Teams' Championship standings
Pos.	+/–	Team	Points
1		(Canada) #65 Ford Multimatic Motorsports	653
2	6	(United States) #77 AO Racing	636
3	1	(United States) #1 Paul Miller Racing	628
4	1	(Canada) #64 Ford Multimatic Motorsports	617
5	3	(United States) #3 Corvette Racing by Pratt Miller Motorsports	614

GTD Teams' Championship standings
Pos.	+/–	Team	Points
1	3	(United States) #57 Winward Racing	690
2	1	(United States) #27 Heart of Racing Team	649
3	1	(United States) #120 Wright Motorsports	633
4	3	(Canada) #13 AWA	590
5		(United States) #96 Turner Motorsport	549

Note: Only the top five positions are included for all sets of standings.

GTP Manufacturers' Championship standings
Pos.	+/–	Manufacturer	Points
1		(Germany) Porsche	760
2		(Japan) Acura	704
3		(Germany) BMW	650
4		(United States) Cadillac	636
5		(Italy) Lamborghini	562

GTD Pro Manufacturers' Championship standings
Pos.	+/–	Manufacturer	Points
1		(United States) Ford	689
2	1	(Germany) BMW	682
3	3	(Germany) Porsche	658
4	2	(United States) Chevrolet	638
5		(Italy) Ferrari	618

GTD Manufacturers' Championship standings
Pos.	+/–	Manufacturer	Points
1	3	(Germany) Mercedes-AMG	694
2	1	(United Kingdom) Aston Martin	654
3	1	(Germany) Porsche	639
4	3	(United States) Chevrolet	636
5	3	(Japan) Lexus	608

Note: Only the top five positions are included for all sets of standings.

IMSA SportsCar Championship
Previous race: 24 Hours of Daytona	2025 season	Next race: Grand Prix of Long Beach
