= 2017 Porsche Carrera Cup Germany =

Motor racing competition

The 2017 Porsche Carrera Cup Germany season was the 32nd German Porsche Carrera Cup season. It began on 7 May at Hockenheimring and finished on 15 October at Hockenheimring after seven double-header meetings, It was a support championship for the ADAC GT Masters Oschersleben, Red Bull Ring and Sachsenring rounds and Deutsche Tourenwagen Masters.

== Teams and drivers ==
Team	No.	Drivers	Class	Rounds
(Germany) Konrad Motorsport	1	(Norway) Dennis Olsen		1-4, 5-7
(Germany) Konrad Motorsport	2	(Austria) Thomas Preining	R	All
(Germany) Konrad Motorsport	3	(Austria) Luca Rettenbacher		1–2, 4
(Germany) Konrad Motorsport	57	(South Africa) Ewan Taylor		5
(Germany) / RN Vision Team Black Falcon; (Germany) / Black Falcon	4	(Italy) Gabriele Piana		1-4, 5-7
(Germany) / RN Vision Team Black Falcon; (Germany) / Black Falcon	5	(Germany) Christian Engelhart		2–4, 5, 7
(Germany) / RN Vision Team Black Falcon; (Germany) / Black Falcon	6	(Luxembourg) Carlos Rivas	Am	All
(Germany) / RN Vision Team Black Falcon; (Germany) / Black Falcon	40	(Luxembourg) Tom Kieffer	G	1, 5
(Germany) / RN Vision Team Black Falcon; (Germany) / Black Falcon	40	(Luxembourg) Tom Kieffer	Am	7
(Germany) / RN Vision Team Black Falcon; (Germany) / Black Falcon	53	(Germany) Christian Kosch	G	5
(Austria) Zele Racing	7	(Austria) Philipp Sager	Am	1-4, 5-7
(Austria) Zele Racing	11	(Slovakia) Richard Gonda	R	1–2
(Austria) Zele Racing	51	(Luxembourg) Dylan Pereira		3
(Austria) Zele Racing	54	(Oman) Al Faisal Al Zubair	R	5, 7
(Germany) Huber Racing by TriSpa	9	(Netherlands) Wolf Nathan	'Am	All
(Germany) Huber Racing by TriSpa	13	(Germany) Wolfgang Triller	Am	All
(Germany) Huber Racing by TriSpa	42	(Germany) Matthias Jeserich	Am	2
(Germany) Huber Racing by TriSpa	83	(Germany) Toni Wolf	R	1, 3, 5–7
(Germany) Team Deutsche Post by Project 1	10	(Netherlands) Larry Ten Voorde	R	All
(Germany) Team Deutsche Post by Project 1	16	(Germany) David Kolkmann		1-4, 5-7
(Germany) Team Deutsche Post by Project 1	56	(Germany) Richy Müller	G Am	6
(Germany) Team Deutsche Post by Project 1	93	(United Kingdom) Nick Yelloly		1-4, 5-7
(Germany) Cito Pretiosa	12	(Germany) Jörn Schmidt-Staade	Am	All
(Germany) Cito Pretiosa	22	(Germany) Peter Scheufen	Am	1, 3, 5–7
(Germany) Cito Pretiosa	33	(Germany) Stefan Rehkopf	Am	All
(Germany) Cito Pretiosa	41	(Germany) Ronja Assmann	Am	2
(Germany) MRS GT-Racing	14	(Norway) Marius Nakken	R	1-4, 5-7
(Germany) MRS GT-Racing	15	(Austria) Christopher Zöchling		1-4, 5-7
(Germany) MRS GT-Racing	17	(Netherlands) Max van Splunteren	R	2
(Germany) MRS GT-Racing	44	(Kuwait) Zaid Ashkanani	R	3
(Germany) MRS GT-Racing	44	(Kuwait) Zaid Ashkanani	G R	5, 7
(Germany) MRS GT-Racing	52	(Germany) “Edward-Lewis Brauner”	G Am	3
(Germany) raceunion Huber Racing	20	(Sweden) Henric Skoog	R	All
(Germany) raceunion Huber Racing	26	(United Kingdom) Ryan Cullen		1-4, 5-7
(Germany) raceunion Huber Racing	87	(Germany) Michael Ammermüller		1-4, 5-7
(Belgium) Speed Lover	27	(Germany) Kim André Hauschild		1–4
(Belgium) Speed Lover	55	(Belgium) Pierre-Yves Paque	Am	5, 7
(United States) MOMO-Megatron Team Partrax	43	(Switzerland) Nico Rindlisbacher	G	3
(United States) MOMO-Megatron Team Partrax	50	(Netherlands) Egidio Perfetti	G	3
(Switzerland) Fach Auto Tech	45	(United Kingdom) Josh Webster	G	3
(Switzerland) Fach Auto Tech	46	(Australia) Matt Campbell	G	3
(France) Martinet by Alméras	47	(France) Florian Latorre	G	3
(France) Martinet by Alméras	48	(France) Roland Bervillé	G Am	3
(France) Martinet by Alméras	49	(Sweden) Philip Morin	G	3
(Poland) Förch Racing by Lukas Motorsport	58	(Germany) Stefan Oschmann	G	7
(Poland) Förch Racing by Lukas Motorsport	59	(Poland) Igor Waliłko	G	7

Icon	Class
Am	Amateur class
R	Rookie
G	Guest

== Race calendar and results ==
Round		Circuit	Date	Pole position	Fastest lap	Winning driver	Winning team	Am-class winner
1	R1	(Germany) Hockenheimring, Baden-Württemberg	6 May	(Germany) Michael Ammermüller	(Norway) Dennis Olsen	(Norway) Dennis Olsen	(Germany) Konrad Motorsport	(Germany) Wolfgang Triller
1	R2	(Germany) Hockenheimring, Baden-Württemberg	7 May	(Germany) Michael Ammermüller	(Norway) Dennis Olsen	(Norway) Dennis Olsen	(Germany) Konrad Motorsport	(Germany) Jörn Schmidt-Staade
2	R1	(Germany) Lausitzring, Brandenburg	3 June	(Germany) Christian Engelhart	(Germany) Christian Engelhart	(Norway) Dennis Olsen	(Germany) Konrad Motorsport	(Germany) Wolfgang Triller
2	R2	(Germany) Lausitzring, Brandenburg	4 June	(Germany) Christian Engelhart	(Germany) Christian Engelhart	(Germany) Christian Engelhart	(Germany) Black Falcon	(Luxembourg) Carlos Rivas
3	R1	(Austria) Red Bull Ring, Spielberg	10 June	(Netherlands) Larry Ten Voorde	(Australia) Matt Campbell	(Netherlands) Larry Ten Voorde (Note: Actual victory achieved by guest driver Matt Campbell.)	(Germany) Team Deutsche Post by Project 1	(Germany) Wolfgang Triller
3	R2	(Austria) Red Bull Ring, Spielberg	11 June	(Australia) Matt Campbell	(Australia) Matt Campbell	(Norway) Dennis Olsen	(Germany) Konrad Motorsport	(Luxembourg) Carlos Rivas
4	R1	(Germany) Norisring, Nuremberg	1 July	(Norway) Dennis Olsen	(Norway) Dennis Olsen	(United Kingdom) Nick Yelloly	(Germany) Team Deutsche Post by Project 1	(Germany) Wolfgang Triller
4	R2	(Germany) Norisring, Nuremberg	2 July	(Norway) Dennis Olsen	(Norway) Dennis Olsen	(Norway) Dennis Olsen	(Germany) Konrad Motorsport	(Germany) Wolfgang Triller
5	R1	(Germany) Nürburgring, Rhineland-Palatinate (Sprint)	9 September	(Austria) Christopher Zöchling	(Norway) Dennis Olsen	(United Kingdom) Nick Yelloly	(Germany) Team Deutsche Post by Project 1	(Germany) Wolfgang Triller
5	R2	(Germany) Nürburgring, Rhineland-Palatinate (Sprint)	10 September	(Austria) Christopher Zöchling	(Austria) Christopher Zöchling	(Norway) Dennis Olsen	(Germany) Konrad Motorsport	(Germany) Wolfgang Triller
6	R1	(Germany) Sachsenring, Saxony	16 September	(Germany) Michael Ammermüller	(Germany) Michael Ammermüller	(Germany) Michael Ammermüller	(Germany) raceunion Huber Racing	(Germany) Wolfgang Triller
6	R2	(Germany) Sachsenring, Saxony	17 September	(Germany) Michael Ammermüller	(Germany) Michael Ammermüller	(United Kingdom) Nick Yelloly	(Germany) Team Deutsche Post by Project 1	(Netherlands) Wolf Nathan
7	R1	(Germany) Hockenheimring, Baden-Württemberg	14 October	(Germany) Christian Engelhart	(Austria) Christopher Zöchling	(Germany) Christian Engelhart	(Germany) Black Falcon	(Germany) Wolfgang Triller
7	R2	(Germany) Hockenheimring, Baden-Württemberg	15 October	(Germany) Christian Engelhart	(Germany) Christian Engelhart	(Austria) Thomas Preining	(Germany) Konrad Motorsport	(Luxembourg) Carlos Rivas
