= Eliot Horowitz =

Founder of MongoDB Inc.

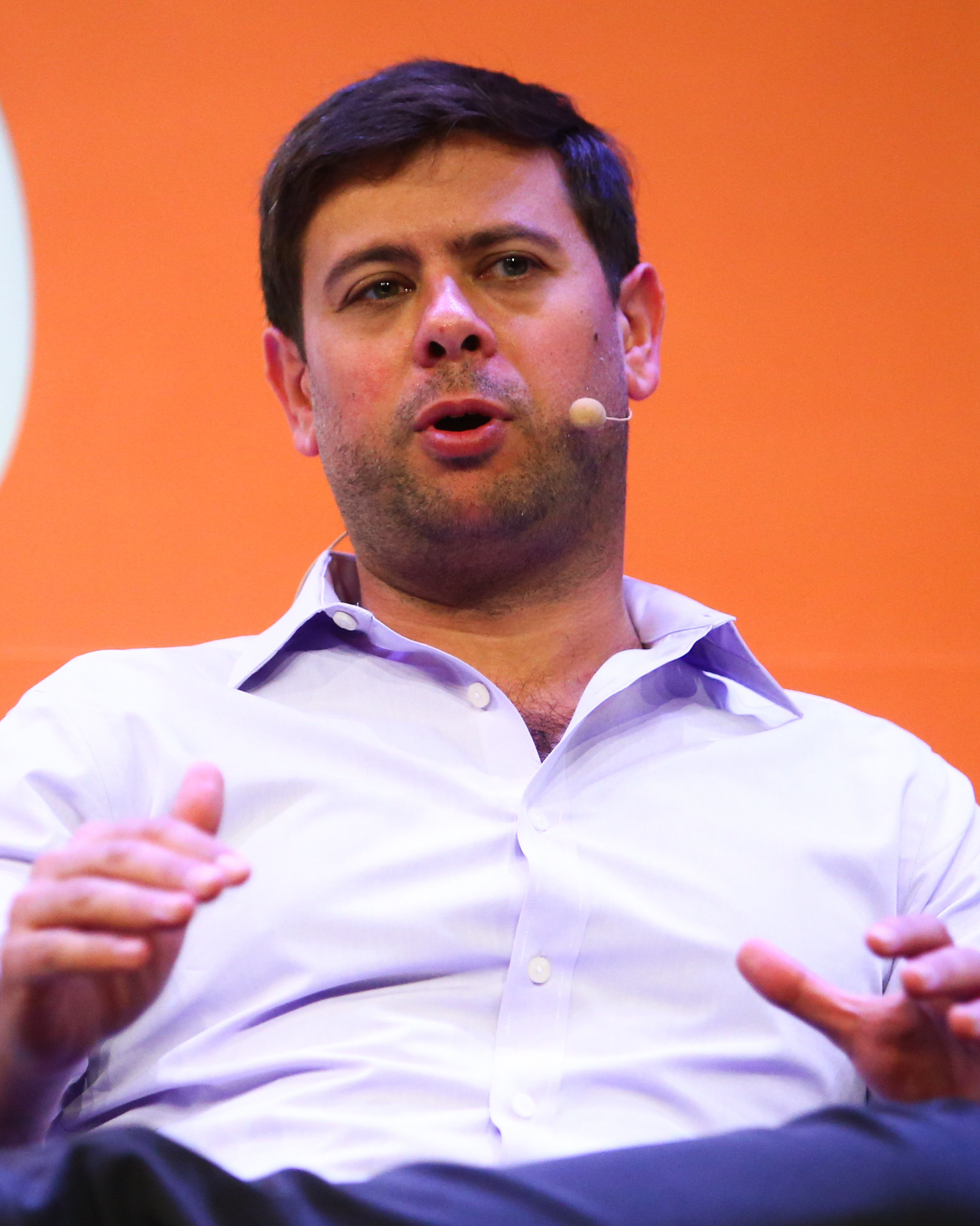
- Born: May 17, 1981 (age 45)
- Education: Brown University
- Occupation: Entrepreneur
- Known for: Founding MongoDB Inc., ShopWiki, Viam
- Website: http://www.eliothorowitz.com/

Eliot Horowitz is a founder and the former chief technology officer of MongoDB Inc., a software company that develops and provides commercial support for the open source NoSQL database MongoDB. Horowitz is the founder and current CEO of Viam, a robotics software startup.

== Education ==
Horowitz attended Brown University where he received a B.S. in Computer Science.

== Career ==
=== Early career and ShopWiki ===
After college, Horowitz joined DoubleClick as a software developer in its R&D group. He then left to start up ShopWiki, a search engine for e-commerce, with the CTO of DoubleClick, Dwight Merriman. He developed the crawling and data extraction algorithm for ShopWiki. In 2006, BusinessWeek selected Eliot as one of its Top 25 Entrepreneurs Under Age 25.

=== MongoDB ===
In 2007, Horowitz formed 10gen with Kevin P. Ryan and Merriman, and started writing the core code base for MongoDB, an open source database. Its first public release came two years later in 2009. MongoDB has become widely used to build high-performance systems by companies. 10gen was later renamed MongoDB Inc. in 2013, and it was listed on NASDAQ in 2017. It has a market capitalization of $27.5 billion as of 2023. In March 2020, after nearly 13 years with the company, Horowitz announced he would step down as chief technology officer, as well as from MongoDB's board of directors, effective July 10, 2020. He continues to serve as technical advisor to MongoDB.

=== Viam Robotics ===
In 2020, Horowitz founded Viam Robotics to create a general-purpose development platform for robotics and enable robotics businesses to get to market faster while taking advantage of cloud services like AI, machine learning and advanced analytics. As of March 2025, Horowitz had raised $30 million in Series C funding for Viam.
