= Panther Express =

Content delivery network in New York City

Panther Express, Inc.
- Type: Privately held company
- Industry: Internet software & Services
- Founded: 2005
- Headquarters: New York, New York, United States
- Website: www.pantherexpress.net

Panther Express is a content delivery network (CDN) based in New York City. The company was founded in August 2005 by Dwight Merriman, Kevin P. Ryan, Ryan Nitz and Pablo Mayrgundter. All the founders came from DoubleClick, a company co-founded by Dwight and headed by Kevin.

On February 25, 2009, Panther Express and CDNetworks merged.

== Investors ==
- 2005 — Angel: Dwight Merriman and Kevin P. Ryan provide the undisclosed seed capital.
- 2006 — Series A: Greylock Partners invests $6 million.
- 2008 — Series B: Index Ventures, Gold Hill Capital and Grelock Partners invest $15.75 million.
- 2009 — Merger with CDNetworks
