= Max Schireson =

- Occupation: Technology Executive
- Known for: CEO of MongoDB Inc. (January 2013-September 2014)
- Website: maxschireson.com

Max Schireson is a technology executive, best known as CEO of MongoDB, and a competitive bridge player. In 2014, he stepped down from CEO to focus more on his family. A tipping point for Schireson came on a long-delayed overnight flight to Austin. The CEO woke up in Tucson to discover his flight had gone through an emergency landing and needed to replace some crew members traumatized by the experience–all while he slept, desperately trying to catch up on rest.

At age 14, Schireson enrolled at the University of California, Berkeley to study math but left before graduating to pursue a career in Silicon Valley.

Schireson has won one North American Bridge Championship, the 2017 Grand National Teams Flight C, an event limited to teams of Non-Life-Masters with under 500 masterpoints. His highest finishes in unlimited North American Bridge Championship events were 8th in the 2025 Freeman Mixed Board-a-Match Teams and 18th in the 2025 Roth Open Swiss Teams. He has qualified for the finals of the Edgar Kaplan Blue Ribbon Pairs five times and the finals of the Von Zedtwitz Life Master Pairs 3 times.

Since 2014, he serve as a non-executive director at Cray Inc., and a consultant at Battery Ventures.

== Personal life ==
He has a wife who is a doctor and professor. Together they have three children, including professional bridge player Olivia Schireson.
