= Dev Ittycheria =

Indian-American software executive and venture capitalist

- Born: 1966 or 1967 (age 59–60)
- Education: Rutgers University (BS)
- Occupation: Entrepreneur
- Known for: CEO of MongoDB Inc.; Co-founder of BladeLogic

Dev Ittycheria (born 1966 or 1967) is a venture capitalist and current temporary CEO of MongoDB Inc. He holds a bachelor's degree in electrical engineering from Rutgers University.

== Career ==
Early in his career, he co-founded and ran a cloud services company called Applica, which eventually merged with Breakaway Solutions.

In 2001, Ittycheria co-founded BladeLogic and led the company through IPO in 2007. He also led the company through its acquisition by BMC for $854 million in 2008, after which he became president at BMC.

In 2012, he joined venture capital firm Greylock Partners as a partner.

In 2014, Ittycheria joined MongoDB as President and CEO, and led the company through IPO in 2017. After 11 years in the role, Ittycheria announced on November 3, 2025 that he would be stepping down from the role and would be replaced by CJ Desai, effective November 10, 2025. He returned to MongoDB as interim CEO in September 2026 after Desai's departure from MongoDB for a role at Meta.

Ittycheria currently serves as Senior Advisor at Sequoia Capital.
