= MongoDB Inc. =

American software company, developer of MongoDB

MongoDB, Inc.

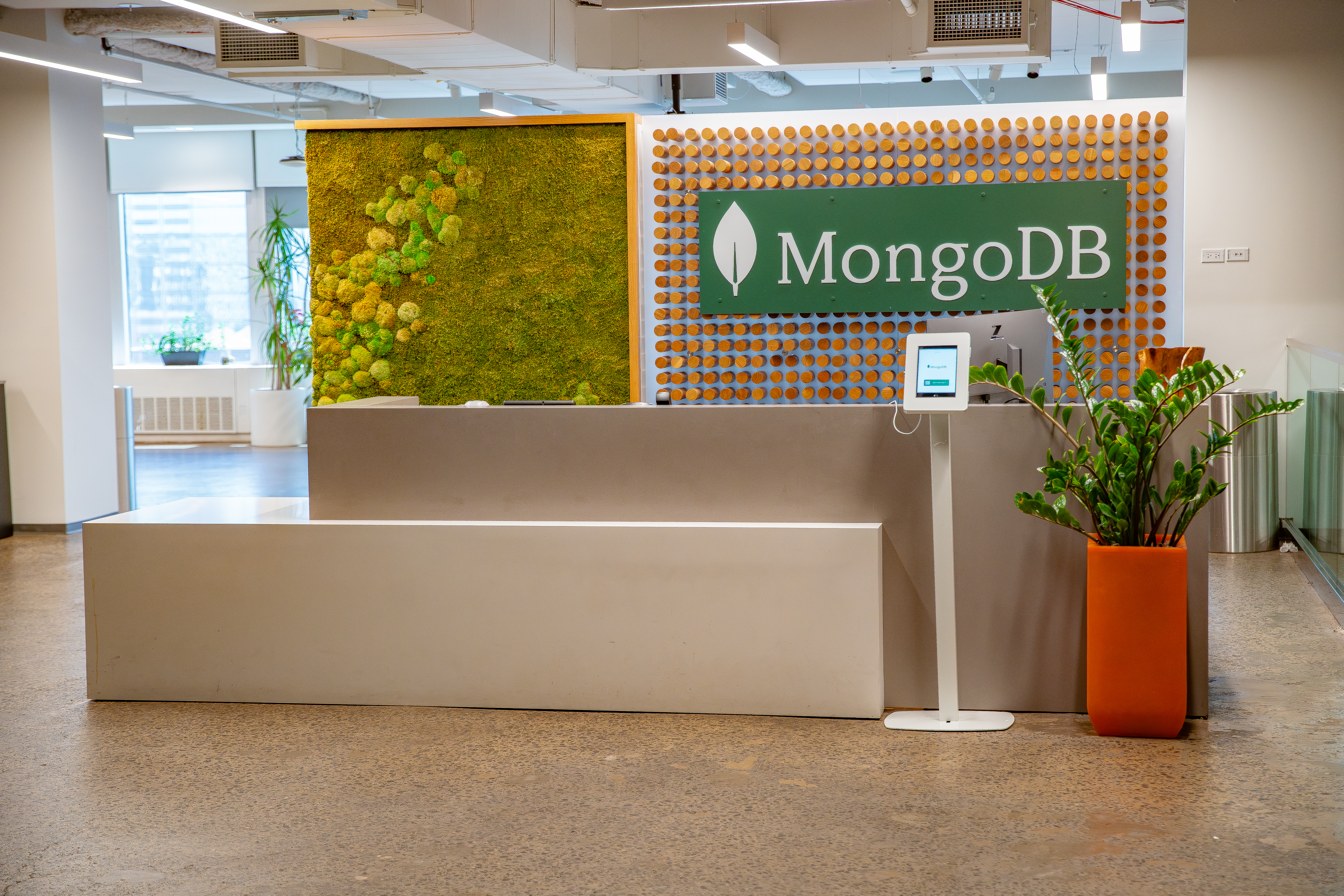
- MongoDB's office in New York City, New York
- Formerly: 10gen, Inc. (2007–2013)
- Type: Public
- Traded as: Nasdaq: MDB (Class A); Russell 1000 component
- Industry: Software
- Founded: 2007; 19 years ago
- Founders: Kevin P. Ryan; Eliot Horowitz; Dwight Merriman
- Headquarters: Paramount Plaza; New York City, U.S.
- Area served: Worldwide
- Key people: Dev Ittycheria (CEO); Tom Killalea (chairman)
- Products: MongoDB
- Revenue: ▲US$2.46 billion (2026)
- Operating income: ▲US$−137 million (2026)
- Net income: ▲US$−71 million (2026)
- Total assets: ▲US$3.76 billion (2026)
- Total equity: ▲US$2.95 billion (2026)
- Number of employees: 5,636 (2026)
- Website: mongodb.com
- Footnotes; Financials as of January 31, 2026.

MongoDB, Inc. is an American software company that develops and provides commercial support for the source-available database engine MongoDB, a database for unstructured data. Over the years, the company has expanded the product from its NoSQL roots to have broader appeal to enterprise customers, such as adding ACID and transactions.

In 2016, the company introduced a SaaS version of the product, called Atlas. As of 2025 there were 59,000 MongoDB customers.

In 2018, the company abandoned AGPL licensing of its product and in its stead introduced the Server Side Public License, which is not OSI-approved.

== Etymology ==
The name "Mongo" was originally a reference to the character from Blazing Saddles, however it was later back-named to be an abbreviation of humongous.

== History ==
The company was first established in 2007 as 10gen. Based in New York City, 10gen was founded by former DoubleClick founder and CTO Dwight Merriman and former DoubleClick CEO and Gilt Groupe founder Kevin P. Ryan with former DoubleClick engineer and ShopWiki founder and CTO Eliot Horowitz and received $81 million in venture capital funding from Flybridge Capital Partners, In-Q-Tel, Intel Capital, New Enterprise Associates (NEA), Red Hat, Sequoia Capital, and Union Square Ventures. 10gen originally aimed to build a platform as a service architecture based entirely on open source components; however, the company was unable to find an existing database platform that met their principles for a cloud architecture. As a result, the company began to develop a document-oriented database system it called MongoDB. After realizing the potential of the software on its own, 10gen's team decided to scrap its cloud platform and focus on maintaining MongoDB instead. In February 2009, 10gen released MongoDB as an open source project. 10gen opened its first west coast office in August 2010, having offices in Palo Alto, Reston, London, Dublin, Barcelona, and Sydney by 2012.

In September 2012, 10gen was in The Wall Street Journal's The Next Big Thing 2012.

On August 27, 2013, 10gen announced that it would change its name to MongoDB Inc., associating itself more closely with what became its flagship products.

In 2013, the Identification Authority of India adopted MongoDB's software to analyze registration trends for new identity documents used to obtain government benefits in India. This raised concerns of potential espionage, since at-the-time MongoDB was partially funded by the United States CIA venture capital arm, In-Q-Tel. As of 2013, there is no evidence in the public domain the CIA actually has any influence over MongoDB.

On August 5, 2014, Dev Ittycheria was appointed president and chief executive officer.

By 2017, MongoDB had raised $311 million in funding from venture capitalists. MongoDB filed for an initial public offering on September 21, 2017 and went public on NASDAQ that October 20. It raised $192 million, valuing the company at $1.6 billion overall. Its market capitalization varied greatly afterwards, reaching $39 billion in 2021 and coming back down to $10 billion by 2024.

MongoDB acquired database engine company WiredTiger in 2014, followed by database-as-a-service company MLab for $68 million in 2018. The following year, in 2019, MongoDB acquired a mobile-focused database company called Realm for $39 million.

A secondary public offering was held on June 29, 2021. In 2022, MongoDB established its own venture capital fund.

On November 3, 2025, MongoDB announced that its Board of Directors has appointed Chirantan “CJ” Desai as President and Chief Executive Officer (“CEO”), effective November 10, 2025. Desai left the position for a new role at Meta in September 2026. After Desai's departure, Ittycheria returned as interim CEO.

== Recent developments ==
In February 2025, MongoDB acquired Voyage AI, a provider of advanced embedding and reranking models, to integrate AI-powered semantic search directly into its database platform. The company simultaneously announced a $200 million stock buyback program.

For fiscal year 2026 (ending January 2026), MongoDB reported total revenue of $2.46 billion, up 23% year-over-year, with Atlas cloud revenue growing 29% and representing 73% of total revenue. The company surpassed 65,200 total customers.

== Software ==
As of 2025, MongoDB was the fifth most popular database software. It focuses mostly on managing large databases of unstructured data. It's typically used for mobile and web apps that commonly use unstructured databases. As of 2024, there were 50,000 MongoDB customers. MongoDB was originally best known as a NoSQL database product. The company released a database as-a-service product called Atlas in 2016 that became 70 percent of MongoDB's revenue by 2024. Over time, MongoDB added analytics, transactional databases, encryption, vector databases, ACID, migration features, and other enterprise tools. Initially, the MongoDB software was free and open source under the AGPL license. MongoDB adopted an SSPL (server side public license) for future releases starting in 2018.

== See also ==
- List of NoSQL software and tools
