= Wangsu Science & Technology =

Content delivery network

Wangsu Science & Technology Co., Ltd (网宿科技股份有限公司)
- Company type: Public
- Traded as: SZSE: 300017; SZSE 300; CSI 300
- Genre: Internet
- Founded: 2000
- Founder: Chen Baozhen (Co-Founder)
- Headquarters: Beijing, China
- Key people: Chengyan Liu (CEO, President); Ke Hong (Vice Chairman, Vice President, CTO); Wei Jiang; Vice President, CFO; Liping Zhou; Vice President, Secretary; Minjian Chu; Vice President, Director
- Products: Website Acceleration; Stream Acceleration; Enterprise Acceleration
- Number of employees: 2,846
- Subsidiaries: Quantil, Inc. Quantil Networks, Inc. Quantil Technology (Ireland) Limited
- Website: en.wangsu.com

Wangsu Science & Technology Co., Ltd. (Chinese: 网宿科技股份有限公司) is a China-based company that provides content delivery network (CDN) and Internet data center (IDC) services. It was founded in 2000 and listed on the Shenzhen Stock Exchange in 2009.

It operates businesses in China as ChinaNetCenter Co., and overseas markets as Quantil, Inc. for CDN services and Quantil Networks, Inc. for IDC services.

== Corporate affairs ==
The largest shareholder is Chen Baozhen, who co-founded one of the predecessor companies of Wangsu, holding 21% of the shares of the company.

Its Chinese domestic markets are divided into East China, South China, North China, Central China, the western region and the northeast region.

== Acquisitions ==
In February 2017, the company announced its acquisition of South Korean competitor CDNetworks for 21.1 billion yen ($185 million) to continue expanding its network and business operations outside of China. The deal involved purchasing 85% percent of CDNetworks' shares from KDDI.
