= 2023 IMSA Battle on the Bricks =

Tenth round of the 2023 IMSA SportsCar Championship season

Track map of Indianapolis Motor Speedway Road Course

The 2023 IMSA Battle on the Bricks was a sports car race that was sanctioned by the International Motor Sports Association (IMSA). The race was held at Indianapolis Motor Speedway in Speedway, Indiana on September 17, 2023. The event was the tenth round of the 2023 IMSA SportsCar Championship and the seventh round of the WeatherTech Sprint Cup.

The No. 7 Porsche of Matt Campbell and Felipe Nasr qualified in pole position and initially held their advantage until Campbell was overtaken by Mathieu Jaminet in the No. 6 Porsche on the race's first lap. Jaminet held the lead until pitting during the second full course caution period. Porsche Penske Motorsport's No. 6 and No. 7 cars failed to overtake the GTD field during the field split. Whelen Engineering Racing's No. 31 Cadillac of Pipo Derani and Alexander Sims inherited the lead which they maintained until Derani was overtaken by Nasr and Tandy. Tandy overtook Nasr in the final pit stop cycle to secure the victory. Porsche Penske Motorsport's No. 7 car of Matt Campbell and Felipe Nasr finished second and the No. 25 BMW of Connor De Phillippi and Nick Yelloly came in third.

The Le Mans Prototype 2 (LMP2) category was won by the No. 11 TDS Racing car of Mikkel Jensen and Steven Thomas. Jensen took the lead in the closing stages of the race after passing No. 8 Tower Motorsports driver Louis Delétraz which earned Jensen and Thomas their second victory of the season. Wayne Boyd and Anthony Mantella took victory in LMP3. Jules Gounon and Daniel Juncadella's No. 79 WeatherTech Racing Mercedes took victory in the GTD Pro class with Ross Gunn and Alex Riberas in the No. 23 Aston Martin in second. Gounon and Juncadella went unchallenged throughout the race after inheriting the lead from The No. 9 Porsche of Klaus Bachler who received a drive-through penalty for changing lanes before crossing the start finish line at the start. The GTD class was won by Philip Ellis and Russell Ward ahead of The No. 78 Lamborghini of Misha Goikhberg and Loris Spinelli

The result meant Derani and Sims became the leaders of the Drivers' Championship with 2460 points, 3 ahead of fifth-placed finishers Albuquerque and Taylor, and a further 2 in front of Mathieu Jaminet, and Nick Tandy. De Phillippi and Yelolly dropped to fourth place and Matt Campbell, and Felipe Nasr advanced to fifth. Porsche took the lead of the Manufactures' Championship by eight points ahead of Cadillac and Acura dropped to third. BMW remained in fourth. Jensen and Thomas took the lead of the LMP2 Drivers' Championship. Boyd and Mantella moved to second in the LMP3 Drivers' Championship. In The GTD Pro Drivers' Championship, Barnicoat and Jack Hawksworth extended their advantage over Antonio García and Jordan Taylor. Madison Snow and Bryan Sellers clinched the GTD Drivers' Championship with one race left in the season.

== Background ==
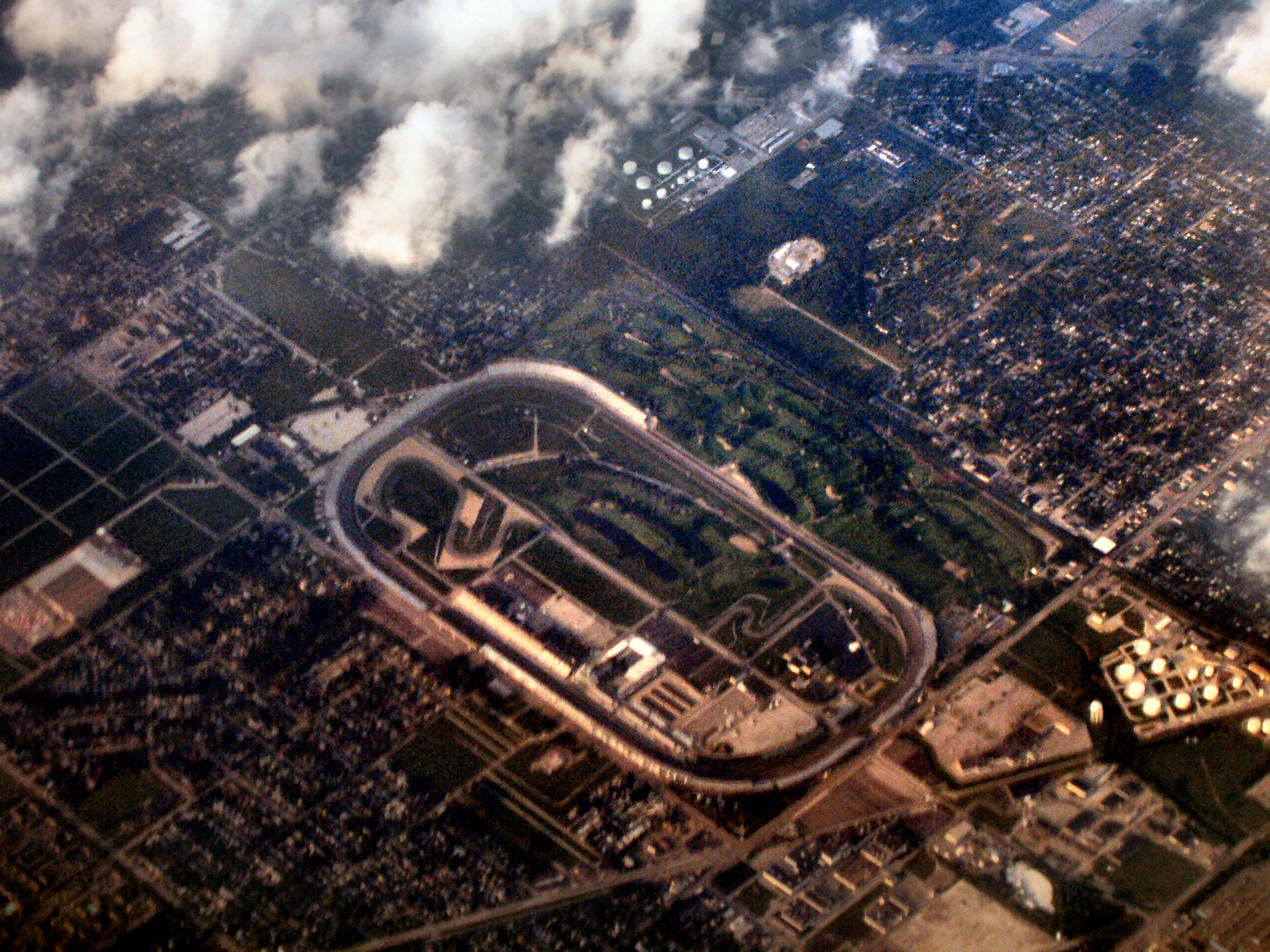
Indianapolis Motor Speedway, the track where the race was held.

International Motor Sports Association's (IMSA) president John Doonan confirmed the race was part of the schedule for the 2023 IMSA SportsCar Championship (IMSA SCC) in August 2022. The event marked IMSA's return to Indianapolis Motor Speedway for the first time since 2014 as the track replaced Mid-Ohio Sports Car Course after the 2022 season. The 2023 IMSA Battle on the Bricks was the tenth of eleven scheduled sports car races of 2023 by IMSA, and it was the seventh round held as part of the WeatherTech Sprint Cup. The race was held at the fourteen-turn 2.439 mi (3.925 km) Indianapolis Motor Speedway Road Course on September 17, 2023.

On September 7, 2023, IMSA released the latest technical bulletin outlining Balance of Performance for the GTP, GTD Pro, and GTD classes. In GTP, the Acura ARX-06 received a 3 kilogram weight increase while the Porsche 963 received a 1 kilogram weight increase. The BMW M Hybrid V8 and Cadillac V-Series.R received no weight changes. All four GTP cars received power increases. In GTD Pro and GTD, the McLaren 720S GT3 Evo received a 30 kilogram weight increase. The Porsche 911 GT3 R (992) received a 10 kilogram weight increase and received a larger air restrictor. The BMW M4 GT3, Chevrolet Corvette C8.R GTD, and Lexus RC F GT3 received smaller air restrictors while most of the cars received fuel capacity adjustments.

Before the race, Filipe Albuquerque and Ricky Taylor led the GTP Drivers' Championship with 2171 points, ahead of Pipo Derani and Alexander Sims in second with 2157 points, and Connor De Phillippi and Nick Yelloly in third with 2098 points. With 1345 points, Paul-Loup Chatin and Ben Keating led the LMP2 Drivers' Championship, 45 points ahead of Mikkel Jensen and Steven Thomas in second. In LMP3, Gar Robinson led the Drivers' Championship with a 251-point advantage over Matt Bell and Orey Fidani. Ben Barnicoat and Jack Hawksworth led the GTD Pro Drivers' Championship with 3165 points, ahead of Antonio García and Jordan Taylor with 3021 points. In GTD, the Drivers' Championship was led by Bryan Sellers and Madison Snow with 2996 points, ahead of Roman De Angelis and Marco Sørensen with 2621 points. Cadillac, Lexus, and BMW were leading their respective Manufacturers' Championships, while WTR with Andretti Autosport, PR1/Mathiasen Motorsports, Riley Motorsports, Vasser Sullivan Racing, and Paul Miller Racing each led their own Teams' Championships.

=== Entries ===
A total of 48 cars took part in the event split across five classes. Ten cars were entered in GTP, 7 in LMP2, 9 in LMP3, 5 in GTD Pro, and 17 in GTD. In LMP2, Dan Goldburg joined Louis Delétraz in the Tower Motorsports entry. Rodrigo Sales joined Giedo van der Garde in The No. 35 TDS Racing entry. In LMP3, Nolan Siegel substituted for Ari Balogh in the No. 30 Jr III Motorsports entry. Performance Tech Motorsports made their first appearance since the Watkins Glen round. Lance Willsey returned to the Sean Creech Motorsport entry. In GTD, Racers Edge Motorsports with WTR Andretti returned after skipping the previous race at Virginia International Raceway. Lone Star Racing made their first appearance in the WeatherTech SportsCar Championship since 2019. Andretti Autosport made their first appearance since the Lime Rock round.

== Testing ==
21 cars were involved in two days of testing divided into four sessions held at the circuit from July 28 to 29. Matt Capmbell set the fastest time early in the first day's running with a time of 1 minute, 15.636 seconds for the No. 7 Porsche Penske Motorsport Porsche. Tijmen van der Helm later set the fastest time of the day in No. 5 JDC-Miller MotorSports Porsche. The fastest LMP2 lap came from Ben Hanley's No. 04 CrowdStrike Oreca while LMP3 was led by Matt Bell's No. 13 AWA Duqueine. Jack Hawksworth led GTD Pro in the No. 14 Lexus RC F GT3 with a 1-minute, 24.898 seconds lap in the second session and Mikaël Grenier set the fastest time in GTD.

The second and final day of testing saw Connor De Phillippi lead in the No. 25 BMW M Team RLL BMW at 1 minute, 14.655 seconds. Mikkel Jensen in the No. 11 TDS Racing Oreca set the fastest time in LMP2 while Wayne Boyd topped LMP3 in the No. 17 AWA Duqueine. Jack Hawksworth in the No. 14 Lexus set the fastest time in GTD Pro while Misha Goikhberg set the fastest time amongst all GTD cars.

== Practice ==
There were two scheduled practice sessions preceding the race start on Sunday, one on Friday afternoon and one on Saturday morning. The first session ran for 90 minutes on Friday afternoon while the second session ran for 105 minutes on Saturday morning.

In the first session, Matt Campbell's No. 6 Penske Porsche lapped quickest at 1:15.184, 0.022 seconds ahead of WTR's Filipe Albuquerque. Sébastien Bourdais was third in CGR's No. 01 Cadillac. De Phillippi and his teammate Eng were fourth and fifth for BMW. Mikkel Jensen led LMP2 with a 1:17.231 lap in TDS Racing's No. 11 car, 0.055 seconds ahead of Ryan Dalziel in the Era Motorsport car. Garett Grist was fastest in LMP3 with a time of 1:20.707. The GTD Pro class was topped by the No. 14 Vasser Sullivan Racing Lexus RC F GT3 of Jack Hawksworth with a time of 1:23.636. Klaus Bachler in the No. 9 Porsche was second fastest followed by Jules Gounon in the No. 79 Mercedes. Patrick Gallagher set the fastest time in GTD. The session was red flagged twice. 40 minutes into the session, Alan Brynjolfsson spun the No. 77 Porsche at turn six and got stuck in the gravel trap. With 15 minutes remaining, the No. 94 Andretti Autosport Aston Martin Vantage AMR GT3 of Jarett Andretti suffered an engine failure and came to a stop at turn 7 bringing out the second red flag.

Campbell led the final session in the No. 7 Penske Porsche with a lap of 1 minute, 14.085 seconds. Jaminet was 0.185 seconds behind in second, with the No. 24 BMW of Eng in third. Yelloly's No. 24 BMW, along with Bourdais' No. 01 Cadillac were fourth and fifth. Jensen led LMP2 in TDS Racing's No. 11 car, 0.065 seconds ahead of Hanley in CrowdStrike's No. 04 Oreca. Matt Bell set the fastest time in LMP3 with a time of 1:20.840. The GTD Pro class was topped by the No. 9 Pfaff Motorsports Porsche 911 GT3 R (992) of Klaus Bachler with a time of 1:22.905. Jules Gounon in the No. 79 Mercedes was second fastest followed by Jack Hawksworth in the No. 14 Lexus. Loris Spinelli set the fastest time in GTD. The session was red flagged three times for on track incidents. 30 minutes into the session, Louis Delétraz spun the No. 8 Tower Motorsports Oreca at turn 1 and got beached in the gravel trap. 22 minutes later, Dwight Merriman in the No. 18 Era Motorsport car and Dennis Andersen in the No. 20 High Class Racing car collided at turn 1 causing debris to be scattered onto the track. Andersen was given a drive-through penalty. The final stoppage came in the closing minutes when the No. 13 AWA Duqueine of Orey Fidani spun at turn 4 and got stuck in the gravel trap.

== Qualifying ==
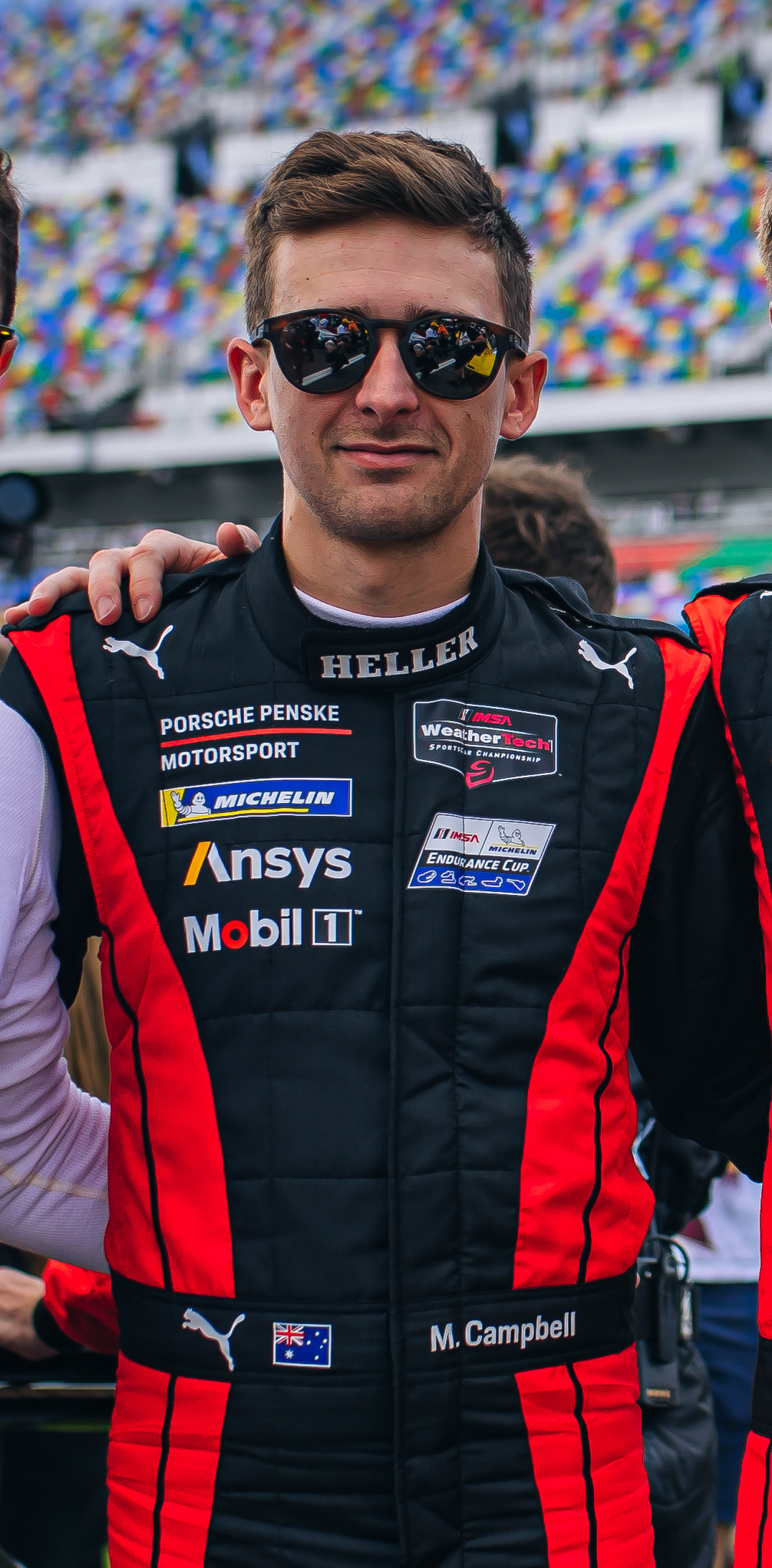
Matt Campbell (pictured in 2024) helped take the No. 7 Porsche's second pole position of 2023.

Saturday's afternoon qualifying was broken into three sessions, with one session for the GTP, LMP2 and LMP3, GTD Pro and GTD classes, which lasted for 20 minutes for the GTP session, and 15 minutes for the LMP2/LMP3, and GTD Pro/GTD sessions. The rules dictated that all teams nominated a driver to qualify their cars, with the Pro-Am LMP2 class requiring a Bronze rated driver to qualify the car while the LMP3 class required a Bronze/Silver Rated driver to qualify the car. The competitors' fastest lap times determined the starting order. IMSA then arranged the grid to put GTPs ahead of the LMP2, LMP3, GTD Pro, and GTD cars.

The first was cars in the GTD Pro and GTD classes. Klaus Bachler qualified on pole in GTD Pro driving the No. 9 Porsche for Pfaff Motorsports, beating Jules Gounon in the No. 79 WeatherTech Racing Mercedes by 0.150 seconds. Following in third was Hawksworth's No. 14 Lexus. The No. 3 Corvette Racing Chevrolet Corvette C8.R GTD and the No. 23 Heart of Racing Team Aston Martin rounded out the GTD Pro rounded out the GTD Pro qualifiers. Madison Snow set the fastest time among all GTD cars driving the No. 1 car for Paul Miller Racing, 0.065 seconds faster than GTD Pro pole sitter Bachler. Snow was over three-tenths clear of Mikaël Grenier in the No. 32 Mercedes-AMG followed by Patrick Gallagher in the No. 96 BMW.

The second session was for cars in the LMP2 and LMP3 classes. Ben Keating qualified on pole in LMP2 driving the No. 52 car for PR1/Mathiasen Motorsports. Keating was 0.440 seconds clear of George Kurtz in the No. 04 CrowdStrike Racing by APR entry followed by Steven Thomas in the No. 11 TDS Racing entry. Bijoy Garg qualified on pole in LMP3 driving the No. 29 car for Jr III Motorsports, beating Nolan Siegel in the sister No. 30 JR III Motorsports entry by over nine-tenths of a second. Orey Fidani was third in the No. 13 AWA entry followed by Alexander Koreiba in the No. 38 Performance Tech Motorsport Ligier, and Anthony Mantella rounded out the top five. The session saw one incident when Gar Robinson, driving the No. 74 Riley Motorsports entry, crashed at turn six. Robinson had his best two laps from the session deleted for causing a red flag.

The final session of qualifying was for the GTP class. Matt Campbell qualified on pole driving the No. 7 car for Porsche Penske Motorsport, besting teammate Mathieu Jaminet in the sister No. 6 Porsche Penske Motorsport entry by less than two-tenths of a second. Following in third was the No. 60 Acura of Tom Blomqvist with the No. 01 Cadillac of Sébastien Bourdais in fourth. Ricky Taylor completed the top five in the No. 10 Acura followed by Philipp Eng's No. 24 BMW in sixth, and Nick Yelloly in the No. 25 BMW M Team RLL entry in seventh. The No. 31 Whelen Engineering Racing Cadillac, Proton Competition, and JDC-Miller MotorSports entries rounded out the GTP qualifiers.

=== Qualifying results ===
Pole positions in each class are indicated in bold and by ‡.

Pos.	Class	No.	Team	Driver	Time	Gap	Grid
1	**GTP**	**7**	**(Germany) Porsche Penske Motorsport**	**(Australia) Matt Campbell**	**1:13.672**	**_**	1‡
2	GTP	6	(Germany) Porsche Penske Motorsport	(France) Mathieu Jaminet	1:13.824	+0.152	2
3	GTP	60	(United States) Meyer Shank Racing with Curb-Agajanian	(United Kingdom) Tom Blomqvist	1:13.864	+0.192	3
4	GTP	01	(United States) Cadillac Racing	(France) Sébastien Bourdais	1:13.939	+0.267	4
5	GTP	10	(United States) Wayne Taylor Racing with Andretti Autosport	(United States) Ricky Taylor	1:14.114	+0.442	5
6	GTP	24	(United States) BMW M Team RLL	(Austria) Philipp Eng	1:14.170	+0.498	6
7	GTP	25	(United States) BMW M Team RLL	(United Kingdom) Nick Yelloly	1:14.173	+0.501	7
8	GTP	31	(United States) Whelen Engineering Racing	(Brazil) Pipo Derani	1:14.284	+0.612	8
9	GTP	59	(Germany) Proton Competition	(Italy) Gianmaria Bruni	1:14.306	+0.634	9
10	GTP	5	(United States) JDC-Miller MotorSports	(Netherlands) Tijmen van der Helm	1:14.632	+0.960	10
11	**LMP2**	**52**	**(United States) PR1/Mathiasen Motorsports**	**(United States) Ben Keating**	**1:17.950**	**+4.278**	11‡
12	LMP2	04	(United States) CrowdStrike Racing by APR	(United States) George Kurtz	1:18.930	+4.718	12
13	LMP2	11	(France) TDS Racing	(United States) Steven Thomas	1:18.623	+4.951	13
14	LMP2	35	(France) TDS Racing	(United States) Rodrigo Sales	1:18.901	+5.229	14
15	LMP2	8	(United States) Tower Motorsports	(United States) Dan Goldburg	1:19.105	+5.433	15
16	LMP2	18	(United States) Era Motorsport	(United States) Dwight Merriman	1:19.621	+5.949	16
17	LMP2	20	(Denmark) High Class Racing	(Denmark) Dennis Andersen	1:20.055	+6.383	17
18	**LMP3**	**29**	**(United States) Jr III Motorsports**	**(United States) Bijoy Garg**	**1:20.513**	**+6.383**	18‡
19	LMP3	30	(United States) Jr III Motorsports	(United States) Nolan Siegel	1:20.982	+7.310	19
20	LMP3	13	(Canada) AWA	(Canada) Orey Fidani	1:22.093	+8.421	20
21	LMP3	38	(United States) Performance Tech Motorsports	(United States) Alexander Koreiba	1:22.153	+8.481	21
22	LMP3	17	(Canada) AWA	(Canada) Anthony Mantella	1:22.675	+9.003	22
23	LMP3	54	(United States) MLT Motorsports	(United States) Jason Rabe	1:122.862	+9.190	23
24	**GTD**	**1**	**(United States) Paul Miller Racing**	**(United States) Madison Snow**	**1:23.075**	**+9.403**	27‡
25	LMP3	4	(United States) Ave Motorsports	(United States) Kevin Conway	1:23.118	+9.446	24
26	**GTD Pro**	**9**	**(Canada) Pfaff Motorsports**	**(Austria) Klaus Bachler**	**1:23.140**	**+9.468**	28‡
27	GTD Pro	79	(United States) WeatherTech Racing	(Andorra) Jules Gounon	1:23.290	+9.618	29
28	GTD Pro	14	(United States) Vasser Sullivan Racing	(United Kingdom) Jack Hawksworth	1:23.345	+9.673	30
29	GTD Pro	23	(United States) Heart of Racing Team	(Spain) Alex Riberas	1:23.395	+9.723	31
30	GTD	32	(United States) Korthoff Preston Motorsports	(Canada) Mikaël Grenier	1:23.424	+9.752	32
31	GTD	96	(United States) Turner Motorsport	(United States) Patrick Gallagher	1:23.657	+9.985	33
32	GTD Pro	3	(United States) Corvette Racing	(United States) Jordan Taylor	1:23.741	+10.069	34
33	GTD	78	(United States) Forte Racing powered by US RaceTronics	(Canada) Misha Goikhberg	1:23.859	+10.187	35
34	GTD	57	(United States) Winward Racing	(United States) Russell Ward	1:23.878	+10.206	36
35	LMP3	74	(United States) Riley Motorsports	(United States) Gar Robinson	1:23.906^{1}	+10.234	25
36	GTD	27	(United States) Heart of Racing Team	(Canada) Roman De Angelis	1:23.910	+10.238	37
37	GTD	12	(United States) Vasser Sullivan Racing	(United States) Frankie Montecalvo	1:24.020	+10.348	38
38	GTD	70	(United Kingdom) Inception Racing	(United States) Brendan Iribe	1:24.072	+10.348	39
39	GTD	91	(United States) Kelly-Moss with Riley	(United States) Alan Metni	1:24.210	+10.400	48^{2}
40	GTD	80	(United States) AO Racing Team	(United States) P.J. Hyett	1:24.246	+10.538	40
41	GTD	97	(United States) Turner Motorsport	(United States) Chandler Hull	1:24.264	+10.574	41
42	GTD	93	(United States) Racers Edge Motorsports with WTR Andretti	(United States) Ashton Harrison	1:24.407	+10.592	42
43	LMP3	33	(United States) Sean Creech Motorsport	(United States) Lance Willsey	1:24.599	+10.735	26
44	GTD	77	(United States) Wright Motorsports	(United States) Alan Brynjolfsson	1:24.663	+10.927	43
45	GTD	94	(United States) Andretti Autosport	(United States) Jarett Andretti	1:24.911	+10.991	44
46	GTD	66	(United States) Gradient Racing	(United States) Sheena Monk	1:25.367	+11.695	45
47	GTD	92	(United States) Kelly-Moss with Riley	(United States) David Brule	1:25.957	+12.285	46
48	GTD	15	(United States) Lone Star Racing	(United States) Anton Dias Perera	1:26.365	+12.693	47
Sources:

- ^{1} The No. 74 Riley Motorsports entry had its two fastest laps deleted as penalty for causing a red flag during its qualifying session.
- ^{2} The No. 91 Kelly-Moss with Riley entry initially qualified ninth for the GTD class. However, the team changed engines after qualifying. By IMSA rules, the entry was moved to the rear of the GTD field on the starting grid.

== Warm up ==
A 20-minute warm up session was held on the morning of September 17. Augusto Farfus lapped fastest with a time of 1:16.009, 0.136 seconds ahead of Mathieu Jaminet in the No. 6 Porsche. Mikkel Jensen led LMP2 while João Barbosa was fastest in LMP3. The fastest GTD Pro lap was a 1:24.488, set by Ross Gunn in the No. 23 Aston Martin, and Trent Hindman's No. 77 Porsche set the fastest time amongst all GTD cars. The No. 10 Wayne Taylor Racing with Andretti Autosport Acura of Ricky Taylor crashed at turn 7. Taylor's Acura suffered bodywork damage and returned to the track after repairs were made.

== Race ==
Race conditions at the start were dry and overcast. The air temperature throughout the race was between 69.0 and 71.9 °F (20.6 and 22.2 °C) and the track temperature ranged from 81.3 to 96.4 °F (27.4 to 35.8 °C).

Campbell maintained his pole position advantage while Sébastien Bourdais and Mathieu Jaminet made it three wide going into turn one. Campbell, Jaminet, and Bourdais locked up at turn one. Jaminet passed Campbell for the overall lead while Bourdais's Cadillac was tagged by the No. 24 BMW of Philipp Eng, sending the Cadillac into a spin and Tom Blomqvist's No. 60 Acura collided with the No. 01 Cadillac. Bachler attempted to block Jules Gounon and changed lanes before crossing the start finish line. As a result, Bachler would receive a drive-through penalty. The No. 66 Acura of Sheena Monk made contact with the No. 97 BMW of Chandler Hull at turn four, turning Hull's BMW around. Monk would receive a drive-through penalty for incident responsibility. Debris from the collisions meant that the first full course caution was displayed. Bourdais pitted for emergency service and his Cadillac received a nose change as well as new tires.

Racing resumed on lap 5 with Jaminet maintaining his advantage over Campbell. Misha Goikhberg's No. 78 Lamborghini forced the No. 96 Turner Motorsport BMW M4 GT3 of Patrick Gallagher off track and into a spin at turn seven. Goikhberg would receive a drive-through penalty for incident responsibility. Lone Star Racing's No. 15 Mercedes-AMG of Anton Dias Perera spun at turn twelve and made contact with the No. 30 Jr III Motorsports Ligier of Nolan Siegel at turn thirteen, turning Siegel's Ligier around. The No. 24 BMW of Philipp Eng pitted for a new tire and received repairs after sustaining damage from earlier contact with the No. 01 Cadillac. George Kurtz's No. 04 Oreca overtook Keating for the lead in LMP2. Dwight Merriman's No. 18 Era Motorsport car spun at turn thirteen after attempting to pass the No. 20 High Class Racing Oreca of Dennis Andersen. Andersen's Oreca suffered left-front damage and he drove into the pit lane for a nose change. Eng pitted for a second time for a nose change. Grenier passed Snow around the outside of turn seven for first position in GTD. At turn ten, Mikaël Grenier's slower No. 32 Korthoff Preston Motorsports Mercedes-AMG made contact with the rear of Lance Willsey's No. 33 Ligier, and Willsey was sent spinning onto the grass. Grenier would receive a drive-through penalty for incident responsibility. Andersen pitted for a second time after attempting to pass the No. 92 Kelly-Moss with Riley Porsche of David Brule going into turn thirteen and suffered suspension damage after getting squeezed into the wall. Eng pitted for a third time after suffering a loss of power and would rejoin in 46th position overall. Ashton Harrison's No. 93 Acura suffered suspension damage after making contact with an LMP2 car at turn one leading to the car retiring from the race.

On lap 30, the final caution was given. Merrian spun at turn fourteen, and skidded towards the outside of the track. Merriman's No. 18 car was left stranded as multiple cars took evasive action to avoid a collision. Majority of the field made their first scheduled pit stops for fuel, tires, and driver changes during the safety car period. Pipo Derani overtook Nasr's No. 7 Porsche and went alongside Tandy's No. 6 Porsche after the No. 6 and No. 7 Porsche Penske Motorsport entries failed to pass the GTD field during the field split in a timely manner. After several laps of confusion, Derani was promoted to first place overall while Tandy and Nasr lost one place each.

When racing resumed, Nasr passed Tandy for second position at turn one. The No. 59 Proton Competition Porsche 963 of Harry Tincknell received a drive-through penalty after the team's pit crew worked on the car outside its pit box. Montecalvo's No. 12 Lexus and Schandorff's No. 70 McLaren made contact at turn thirteen, causing a puncture for both cars. Montecalvo drove into the pit lane straight away while Schandorff completed an entire lap before pitting. Delétraz in the No. 8 Oreca took the lead after most of the LMP2 field made their pit stops for driver changes. On lap 65, Derani locked up going into turn one and Nasr passed Derani for the overall lead while Tandy in the No. 6 Porsche overtook Derani's Cadillac for second. Nasr and Tandy dueled for the next several laps before making their final pit stops.

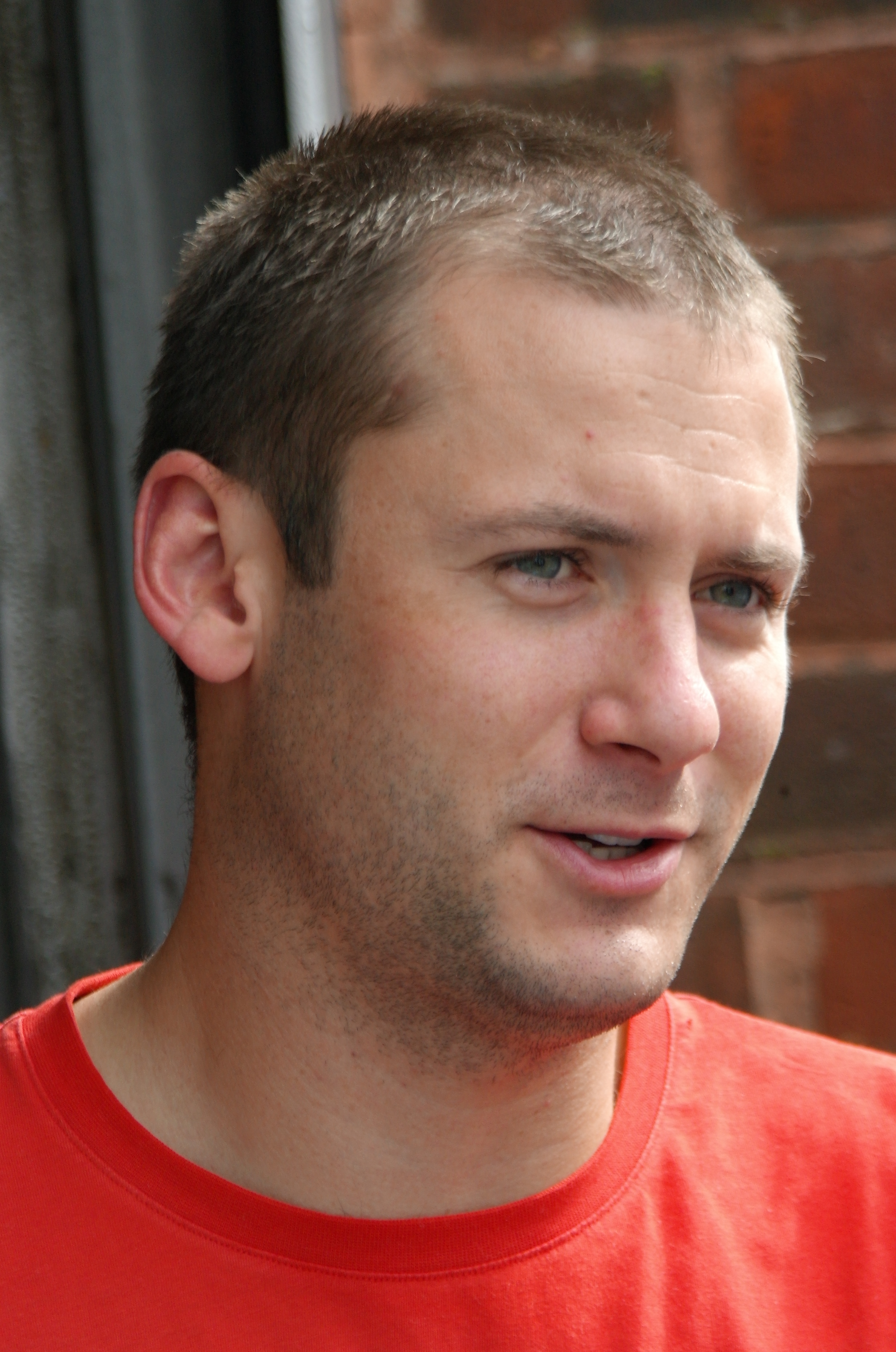
Nick Tandy (pictured in 2014) secured the No. 6 Porsche's second victory of the season.

After the final pit stop cycle, Tandy took the lead after Nasr locked up at turn seven on his outlap and De Phillippi took over third in the category. Delétraz kept his advantage over Paul-Loup Chatin in LMP2. Boyd took the lead of LMP3 with Burdon in second. Juncadella kept the lead of GTD Pro with Gunn in second. Sellers took the GTD lead and Ellis took over second in the category. Sims locked up at turn one and went onto the escape road. Mikkel Jesen's No. 11 TDS Racing Oreca passed Delétraz for the lead in LMP2 with 26 minutes remaining. Philip Ellis overtook Sellers for the lead in GTD at turn ten and Spinelli passed Sellers for second at turn twelve shortly afterwards. Spinelli overtook Ellis for the lead in GTD at turn thirteen with ten minutes remaining. Loup-Chatin made a late pit stop for fuel. Going into turn seven with 3 laps remaining, Philip Ellis dived down the inside of Loris Spinelli and made contact with the No. 78 Lamborghini. Spinelli went onto the grass as a result of extra speed gained from the contact by the No. 57 Mercedes-AMG and Ellis retook the lead of GTD. Dakota Dickerson's No. 54 Ligier suffered left-rear damage after making contact with Nasr's No. 7 Porsche at turn seven leading to the car retiring from the race. Tandy maintained the lead for the rest of the race winning after completing 113 laps. Nasr finished second, 17.421 seconds adrift of the No. 6 Porsche, and De Phillippi completed the podium positions by finishing third. Jensen maintained the No. 11 TDS Racing Oreca's lead to win LMP2 by 19.909 seconds over the No. 8 Tower Motorsports car of Louis Delétraz and Dan Goldburg, and third-position finishers Ben Hanley and George Kurtz in the No. 04 CrowdStrike Racing by APR car. Boyd maintained the No. 17 AWA Duqueine's lead to in LMP3 over the No. 74 Riley Motorsports Ligier of Josh Burdon and Gar Robinson followed by the No. 30 Jr III Motorsports entry of Nolan Siegel and Garett Grist. Unchallenged in the closing stages, Jules Gounon and Daniel Juncadella took their third victory of the season in GTD Pro. The No. 23 Aston Martin of Gunn and Riberas took second; Barnicoat and Jack Hawksworth's No. 14 Lexus took third. Philip Ellis and Russell Ward the first win of the season for the No. 57 Mercedes-AMG in GTD. The No. 78 Forte Racing powered by US RaceTronics Lamborghini of Misha Goikhberg and Loris Spinelli finished second, and Bryan Sellers and Madison Snow in the No. 1 Paul Miller Racing BMW rounded out the podium.

=== Post-race ===
Jaminet was pleased with his win after overcoming disappoint since the Watkins Glen round: "I’ve been very disappointed since Watkins Glen. We’ve had only — pretty much — bad races. And looking at it, it still hurts. So we finally get a win back, and that put us back on the championship hunt. And I’m just hungry for more, to be honest. I just want to go to Atlanta now and race." Derani explained his overtaking of the No. 6 and No. 7 Porsches behind the safety car: "We were on top of the rules. I tried to overtake the 7, he kind of blocked me. I think he was trying to give the 6 a chance to go, and then obviously the 6 didn’t go – and I just went. We’re just trying to follow the rules to the best of our ability. Sometimes miscommunications happen, which probably was the case. I think IMSA did the right thing on the call. If the car in front of you don’t go, and you’ve given them enough time...then it is what it is."

Thomas praised his teammate, Jensen for securing the No. 11 TDS team victory in LMP2. Mantella called his LMP3 win "a dream come true": "When I think back to Daytona, it is one of the greatest moments of my life – especially to be driving with such professionals. And Indy is on that bucket list. To kiss the bricks after a win is every kid’s dream. Everybody that did it – (team owner) Andrew Wojteczko, Wayne and myself – we all did it with tears in our eyes because it means that much." Gounon admitted his was surprised by Bacher changing lanes at the start: “I was on the radio about that right away. I knew there was going to be a penalty, so I immediately backed out of it and that opened the door for us. I think it would have been a difficult fight for us, but we were up for it." Snow said it was nice to secure the GTD Drivers' Championship 1 race early: "Petit Le Mans is a very, very long race, and it’s a lot of stress off our shoulders, knowing that at Petit, we can just enjoy racing. But that’s due to all the hard work Paul Miller Racing put in going into this weekend knowing that if we perform the absolute best we did this weekend, we will be able to relax the next weekend. Indy has been awesome."

As a result of winning the race, Jaminet and Tandy advanced from fourth to third in the GTP Drivers' Championship. Derani and Sims jumped from second to first while Filipe Albuquerque and Ricky Taylor dropped from first to second. Campbell and Nasr advanced from seventh to fifth. As a result of winning the race, Jensen and Thomas took the lead of the LMP2 Drivers' Championship. The result kept Robinson atop the LMP3 Drivers' Championship. As a result of winning the race, Gounon and Juncadella advanced from fourth to third in the GTD Pro Drivers' Championship. By finishing in third place, Sellers and Snow clinched the GTD Drivers' Championship with 1 race remaining as De Angelis and Sørensen were 405 points behind, with 385 points available. Lexus and BMW continued to lead their respective Manufactures' Championships while Porsche took the lead of the GTP Manufactures' Championship. Riley Motorsports, Vasser Sullivan Racing, and Paul Miller Racing kept their respective advantages in their respective of Teams' Championships. Porsche Penske Motorsport and TDS Racing became the leaders of their respective class Teams' Championships with one round remaining in the season.

=== Race Result ===
Class winners are in bold and ‡.

Pos	Class	No	Team	Drivers	Chassis	Laps	Time/Retired
Pos	Class	No	Team	Drivers	Engine	Laps	Time/Retired
1	**GTP**	**6**	**(Germany) Porsche Penske Motorsport**	**(France) Mathieu Jaminet (United Kingdom) Nick Tandy**	**Porsche 963**	**113**	**2:41:00.878‡**
1	**GTP**	**6**	**(Germany) Porsche Penske Motorsport**	**(France) Mathieu Jaminet (United Kingdom) Nick Tandy**	**Porsche 9RD 4.6 L Turbo V8**	**113**	**2:41:00.878‡**
2	GTP	7	(Germany) Porsche Penske Motorsport	(Australia) Matt Campbell (Brazil) Felipe Nasr	Porsche 963	113	+17.421
2	GTP	7	(Germany) Porsche Penske Motorsport	(Australia) Matt Campbell (Brazil) Felipe Nasr	Porsche 9RD 4.6 L Turbo V8	113	+17.421
3	GTP	25	(United States) BMW M Team RLL	(United States) Connor De Phillippi (United Kingdom) Nick Yelloly	BMW M Hybrid V8	113	+32.964
3	GTP	25	(United States) BMW M Team RLL	(United States) Connor De Phillippi (United Kingdom) Nick Yelloly	BMW P66/3 4.0 L Turbo V8	113	+32.964
4	GTP	31	(United States) Whelen Engineering Racing	(Brazil) Pipo Derani (United Kingdom) Alexander Sims	Cadillac V-Series.R	113	+48.431
4	GTP	31	(United States) Whelen Engineering Racing	(Brazil) Pipo Derani (United Kingdom) Alexander Sims	Cadillac LMC55R 5.5 L V8	113	+48.431
5	GTP	10	(United States) Wayne Taylor Racing with Andretti Autosport	(Portugal) Filipe Albuquerque (United States) Ricky Taylor	Acura ARX-06	113	+1:00.008
5	GTP	10	(United States) Wayne Taylor Racing with Andretti Autosport	(Portugal) Filipe Albuquerque (United States) Ricky Taylor	Acura AR24e 2.4 L Turbo V6	113	+1:00.008
6	GTP	60	(United States) Meyer Shank Racing with Curb-Agajanian	(United Kingdom) Tom Blomqvist (United States) Colin Braun	Acura ARX-06	113	+1:09.574
6	GTP	60	(United States) Meyer Shank Racing with Curb-Agajanian	(United Kingdom) Tom Blomqvist (United States) Colin Braun	Acura AR24e 2.4 L Turbo V6	113	+1:09.574
7	GTP	01	(United States) Cadillac Racing	(France) Sébastien Bourdais (Netherlands) Renger van der Zande	Cadillac V-Series.R	113	+1:10.986
7	GTP	01	(United States) Cadillac Racing	(France) Sébastien Bourdais (Netherlands) Renger van der Zande	Cadillac LMC55R 5.5 L V8	113	+1:10.986
8	GTP	5	(United States) JDC-Miller MotorSports	(Germany) Mike Rockenfeller (Netherlands) Tijmen van der Helm	Porsche 963	113	+1:11.470
8	GTP	5	(United States) JDC-Miller MotorSports	(Germany) Mike Rockenfeller (Netherlands) Tijmen van der Helm	Porsche 9RD 4.6 L Turbo V8	113	+1:11.470
9	GTP	59	(Germany) Proton Competition	(Italy) Gianmaria Bruni (United Kingdom) Harry Tincknell	Porsche 963	113	+1:13.652
9	GTP	59	(Germany) Proton Competition	(Italy) Gianmaria Bruni (United Kingdom) Harry Tincknell	Porsche 9RD 4.6 L Turbo V8	113	+1:13.652
10	**LMP2**	**11**	**(France) TDS Racing**	**(Denmark) Mikkel Jensen (United States) Steven Thomas**	**Oreca 07**	**110**	**+3 Laps‡**
10	**LMP2**	**11**	**(France) TDS Racing**	**(Denmark) Mikkel Jensen (United States) Steven Thomas**	**Gibson GK428 4.2 L V8 engine**	**110**	**+3 Laps‡**
11	LMP2	8	(United States) Tower Motorsports	(Switzerland) Louis Delétraz (United States) Dan Goldburg	Oreca 07	110	+3 Laps
11	LMP2	8	(United States) Tower Motorsports	(Switzerland) Louis Delétraz (United States) Dan Goldburg	Gibson GK428 4.2 L V8 engine	110	+3 Laps
12	LMP2	04	(United States) CrowdStrike Racing by APR	(United Kingdom) Ben Hanley (United States) George Kurtz	Oreca 07	110	+3 Laps
12	LMP2	04	(United States) CrowdStrike Racing by APR	(United Kingdom) Ben Hanley (United States) George Kurtz	Gibson GK428 4.2 L V8 engine	110	+3 Laps
13	LMP2	52	(United States) PR1/Mathiasen Motorsports	(France) Paul-Loup Chatin (United States) Ben Keating	Oreca 07	109	+4 Laps
13	LMP2	52	(United States) PR1/Mathiasen Motorsports	(France) Paul-Loup Chatin (United States) Ben Keating	Gibson GK428 4.2 L V8 engine	109	+4 Laps
14	LMP2	35	(France) TDS Racing	(Netherlands) Giedo van der Garde (United States) Rodrigo Sales	Oreca 07	108	+5 Laps
14	LMP2	35	(France) TDS Racing	(Netherlands) Giedo van der Garde (United States) Rodrigo Sales	Gibson GK428 4.2 L V8 engine	108	+5 Laps
15	**LMP3**	**17**	**(Canada) AWA**	**(United Kingdom) Wayne Boyd (Canada) Anthony Mantella**	**Duqueine M30 - D08**	**107**	**+6 Laps‡**
15	**LMP3**	**17**	**(Canada) AWA**	**(United Kingdom) Wayne Boyd (Canada) Anthony Mantella**	**Nissan VK56DE 5.6L V8 engine**	**107**	**+6 Laps‡**
16	LMP3	74	(United States) Riley Motorsports	(Australia) Josh Burdon (United States) Gar Robinson	Ligier JS P320	107	+6 Laps
16	LMP3	74	(United States) Riley Motorsports	(Australia) Josh Burdon (United States) Gar Robinson	Nissan VK56DE 5.6L V8 engine	107	+6 Laps
17	LMP3	30	(United States) Jr III Motorsports	(United States) Nolan Siegel (Canada) Garett Grist	Ligier JS P320	107	+6 Laps
17	LMP3	30	(United States) Jr III Motorsports	(United States) Nolan Siegel (Canada) Garett Grist	Nissan VK56DE 5.6L V8 engine	107	+6 Laps
18	LMP3	29	(United States) Jr III Motorsports	(United States) Bijoy Garg (Portugal) Guilherme Oliveira	Ligier JS P320	107	+6 Laps
18	LMP3	29	(United States) Jr III Motorsports	(United States) Bijoy Garg (Portugal) Guilherme Oliveira	Nissan VK56DE 5.6L V8 engine	107	+6 Laps
19	LMP3	13	(Canada) AWA	(United Kingdom) Matt Bell (Canada) Orey Fidani	Duqueine M30 - D08	107	+6 Laps
19	LMP3	13	(Canada) AWA	(United Kingdom) Matt Bell (Canada) Orey Fidani	Nissan VK56DE 5.6L V8 engine	107	+6 Laps
20	LMP2	18	(United States) Era Motorsport	(United Kingdom) Ryan Dalziel (United States) Dwight Merriman	Oreca 07	106	+7 Laps
20	LMP2	18	(United States) Era Motorsport	(United Kingdom) Ryan Dalziel (United States) Dwight Merriman	Gibson GK428 4.2 L V8 engine	106	+7 Laps
21	LMP3	33	(United States) Sean Creech Motorsport	(Portugal) João Barbosa (United States) Lance Willsey	Ligier JS P320	106	+7 Laps
21	LMP3	33	(United States) Sean Creech Motorsport	(Portugal) João Barbosa (United States) Lance Willsey	Nissan VK56DE 5.6L V8 engine	106	+7 Laps
22	LMP3	4	(United States) Ave Motorsports	(United States) Kevin Conway (United States) John Geesbreght	Ligier JS P320	105	+8 Laps
22	LMP3	4	(United States) Ave Motorsports	(United States) Kevin Conway (United States) John Geesbreght	Nissan VK56DE 5.6L V8 engine	105	+8 Laps
23	**GTD Pro**	**79**	**(United States) WeatherTech Racing**	**(Andorra) Jules Gounon (Spain) Daniel Juncadella**	**Mercedes-AMG GT3 Evo**	**104**	**+9 Laps‡**
23	**GTD Pro**	**79**	**(United States) WeatherTech Racing**	**(Andorra) Jules Gounon (Spain) Daniel Juncadella**	**Mercedes-AMG M159 6.2 L V8**	**104**	**+9 Laps‡**
24	GTD Pro	23	(United States) Heart of Racing Team	(United Kingdom) Ross Gunn (Spain) Alex Riberas	Aston Martin Vantage AMR GT3	104	+9 Laps
24	GTD Pro	23	(United States) Heart of Racing Team	(United Kingdom) Ross Gunn (Spain) Alex Riberas	Aston Martin 4.0 L Turbo V8	104	+9 Laps
25	GTD Pro	14	(United States) Vasser Sullivan Racing	(United Kingdom) Ben Barnicoat (United Kingdom) Jack Hawksworth	Lexus RC F GT3	104	+9 Laps
25	GTD Pro	14	(United States) Vasser Sullivan Racing	(United Kingdom) Ben Barnicoat (United Kingdom) Jack Hawksworth	Toyota 2UR 5.0 L V8	104	+9 Laps
26	**GTD**	**57**	**(United States) Winward Racing**	**(United Kingdom) Philip Ellis (United States) Russell Ward**	**Mercedes-AMG GT3 Evo**	**104**	**+9 Laps‡**
26	**GTD**	**57**	**(United States) Winward Racing**	**(United Kingdom) Philip Ellis (United States) Russell Ward**	**Mercedes-AMG M159 6.2 L V8**	**104**	**+9 Laps‡**
27	GTD	78	(United States) Forte Racing powered by US RaceTronics	(Canada) Misha Goikhberg (Italy) Loris Spinelli	Lamborghini Huracán GT3 Evo 2	104	+9 Laps
27	GTD	78	(United States) Forte Racing powered by US RaceTronics	(Canada) Misha Goikhberg (Italy) Loris Spinelli	Lamborghini 5.2 L V10	104	+9 Laps
28	GTD	1	(United States) Paul Miller Racing	(United States) Bryan Sellers (United States) Madison Snow	BMW M4 GT3	104	+9 Laps
28	GTD	1	(United States) Paul Miller Racing	(United States) Bryan Sellers (United States) Madison Snow	BMW S58B30T0 3.0 L Turbo I6	104	+9 Laps
29	GTD	27	(United States) Heart of Racing Team	(Canada) Roman De Angelis (Denmark) Marco Sørensen	Aston Martin Vantage AMR GT3	104	+9 Laps
29	GTD	27	(United States) Heart of Racing Team	(Canada) Roman De Angelis (Denmark) Marco Sørensen	Aston Martin 4.0 L Turbo V8	104	+9 Laps
30	GTD	96	(United States) Turner Motorsport	(United States) Robby Foley (United States) Patrick Gallagher	BMW M4 GT3	104	+9 Laps
30	GTD	96	(United States) Turner Motorsport	(United States) Robby Foley (United States) Patrick Gallagher	BMW S58B30T0 3.0 L Turbo I6	104	+9 Laps
31	GTD	77	(United States) Wright Motorsports	(United States) Alan Brynjolfsson (United States) Trent Hindman	Porsche 911 GT3 R (992)	104	+9 Laps
31	GTD	77	(United States) Wright Motorsports	(United States) Alan Brynjolfsson (United States) Trent Hindman	Porsche 4.2 L Flat-6	104	+9 Laps
32	GTD Pro	9	(Canada) Pfaff Motorsports	(Austria) Klaus Bachler (France) Patrick Pilet	Porsche 911 GT3 R (992)	104	+9 Laps
32	GTD Pro	9	(Canada) Pfaff Motorsports	(Austria) Klaus Bachler (France) Patrick Pilet	Porsche 4.2 L Flat-6	104	+9 Laps
33	GTD Pro	3	(United States) Corvette Racing	(Spain) Antonio García (United States) Jordan Taylor	Chevrolet Corvette C8.R GTD	104	+9 Laps
33	GTD Pro	3	(United States) Corvette Racing	(Spain) Antonio García (United States) Jordan Taylor	Chevrolet 5.5 L V8	104	+9 Laps
34	GTD	97	(United States) Turner Motorsport	(United States) Bill Auberlen (United States) Chandler Hull	BMW M4 GT3	104	+9 Laps
34	GTD	97	(United States) Turner Motorsport	(United States) Bill Auberlen (United States) Chandler Hull	BMW S58B30T0 3.0 L Turbo I6	104	+9 Laps
35	GTD	92	(United States) Kelly-Moss with Riley	(United States) David Brule (United States) Alec Udell	Porsche 911 GT3 R (992)	104	+9 Laps
35	GTD	92	(United States) Kelly-Moss with Riley	(United States) David Brule (United States) Alec Udell	Porsche 4.2 L Flat-6	104	+9 Laps
36	GTD	32	(United States) Korthoff Preston Motorsports	(Canada) Mikaël Grenier (United States) Mike Skeen	Mercedes-AMG GT3 Evo	104	+9 Laps
36	GTD	32	(United States) Korthoff Preston Motorsports	(Canada) Mikaël Grenier (United States) Mike Skeen	Mercedes-AMG M159 6.2 L V8	104	+9 Laps
37	GTD	80	(United States) AO Racing Team	(United States) P.J. Hyett (United Kingdom) Sebastian Priaulx	Porsche 911 GT3 R (992)	104	+9 Laps
37	GTD	80	(United States) AO Racing Team	(United States) P.J. Hyett (United Kingdom) Sebastian Priaulx	Porsche 4.2 L Flat-6	104	+9 Laps
38 DNF	LMP3	54	(United States) MLT Motorsports	(United States) Jason Rabe (United States) Dakota Dickerson	Ligier JS P320	103	Did Not Finish
38 DNF	LMP3	54	(United States) MLT Motorsports	(United States) Jason Rabe (United States) Dakota Dickerson	Nissan VK56DE 5.6L V8 engine	103	Did Not Finish
39	GTD	91	(United States) Kelly-Moss with Riley	(Netherlands) Kay van Berlo (United States) Alan Metni	Porsche 911 GT3 R (992)	103	+10 Laps
39	GTD	91	(United States) Kelly-Moss with Riley	(Netherlands) Kay van Berlo (United States) Alan Metni	Porsche 4.2 L Flat-6	103	+10 Laps
40	GTP	24	(United States) BMW M Team RLL	(Austria) Philipp Eng (Brazil) Augusto Farfus	BMW M Hybrid V8	103	+10 Laps
40	GTP	24	(United States) BMW M Team RLL	(Austria) Philipp Eng (Brazil) Augusto Farfus	BMW P66/3 4.0 L Turbo V8	103	+10 Laps
41	GTD	94	(United States) Andretti Autosport	(United States) Jarett Andretti (Colombia) Gabby Chaves	Aston Martin Vantage AMR GT3	103	+10 Laps
41	GTD	94	(United States) Andretti Autosport	(United States) Jarett Andretti (Colombia) Gabby Chaves	Aston Martin 4.0 L Turbo V8	103	+10 Laps
42	GTD	66	(United States) Gradient Racing	(United Kingdom) Katherine Legge (United States) Sheena Monk	Acura NSX GT3 Evo22	103	+10 Laps
42	GTD	66	(United States) Gradient Racing	(United Kingdom) Katherine Legge (United States) Sheena Monk	Acura 3.5 L Turbo V6	103	+10 Laps
43	GTD	12	(United States) Vasser Sullivan Racing	(United States) Frankie Montecalvo (United States) Aaron Telitz	Lexus RC F GT3	103	+10 Laps
43	GTD	12	(United States) Vasser Sullivan Racing	(United States) Frankie Montecalvo (United States) Aaron Telitz	Toyota 2UR 5.0 L V8	103	+10 Laps
44	GTD	15	(United States) Lone Star Racing	(Australia) Scott Andrews (United States) Anton Dias Perera	Mercedes-AMG GT3 Evo	103	+10 Laps
44	GTD	15	(United States) Lone Star Racing	(Australia) Scott Andrews (United States) Anton Dias Perera	Mercedes-AMG M159 6.2 L V8	103	+10 Laps
45	LMP3	38	(United States) Performance Tech Motorsports	(United States) Connor Bloum (United States) Alexander Koreiba	Ligier JS P320	102	+11 Laps
45	LMP3	38	(United States) Performance Tech Motorsports	(United States) Connor Bloum (United States) Alexander Koreiba	Nissan VK56DE 5.6L V8 engine	102	+11 Laps
46	GTD	70	(United Kingdom) Inception Racing	(United States) Brendan Iribe (Denmark) Frederik Schandorff	McLaren 720S GT3 Evo	96	+17 Laps
46	GTD	70	(United Kingdom) Inception Racing	(United States) Brendan Iribe (Denmark) Frederik Schandorff	McLaren M840T 4.0 L Turbo V8	96	+17 Laps
47	LMP2	20	(Denmark) High Class Racing	(Denmark) Dennis Andersen (United Arab Emirates) Ed Jones	Oreca 07	78	+35 Laps
47	LMP2	20	(Denmark) High Class Racing	(Denmark) Dennis Andersen (United Arab Emirates) Ed Jones	Gibson GK428 4.2 L V8 engine	78	+35 Laps
48 DNF	GTD	93	(United States) Racers Edge Motorsports with WTR Andretti	(United States) Ashton Harrison (Canada) Kyle Marcelli	Acura NSX GT3 Evo22	24	Did Not Finish
48 DNF	GTD	93	(United States) Racers Edge Motorsports with WTR Andretti	(United States) Ashton Harrison (Canada) Kyle Marcelli	Acura 3.5 L Turbo V6	24	Did Not Finish

== Standings after the race ==
GTP Drivers' Championship standings
Pos.	+/–	Driver	Points
1	1	(Brazil) Pipo Derani (United Kingdom) Alexander Sims	2460
2	1	(Portugal) Filipe Albuquerque (United States) Ricky Taylor	2457
3	1	(United Kingdom) Nick Tandy (France) Mathieu Jaminet	2455
4	1	(United States) Connor De Phillippi (United Kingdom) Nick Yelloly	2422
5	2	(Australia) Matt Campbell (Brazil) Felipe Nasr	2387

LMP2 Drivers' Championship standings
Pos.	+/–	Driver	Points
1	1	(Denmark) Mikkel Jensen (United States) Steven Thomas	1680
2	1	(France) Paul-Loup Chatin (United States) Ben Keating	1660
3		(United Kingdom) Ben Hanley (United States) George Kurtz	1580
4		(Netherlands) Giedo van der Garde	1482
5		(United Kingdom) Ryan Dalziel (United States) Dwight Merriman	1457

LMP3 Drivers' Championship standings
Pos.	+/–	Driver	Points
1		(United States) Gar Robinson	1838
2	2	(United Kingdom) Wayne Boyd (Canada) Anthony Mantella	1594
3		(Canada) Garett Grist	1565
4	2	(United Kingdom) Matt Bell (Canada) Orey Fidani	1534
5	1	(Australia) Josh Burdon	1453

GTD Pro Drivers' Championship standings
Pos.	+/–	Driver	Points
1		(United Kingdom) Ben Barnicoat (United Kingdom) Jack Hawksworth	3495
2		(Spain) Antonio García (United States) Jordan Taylor	3307
3	1	(Andorra) Jules Gounon (Spain) Daniel Juncadella	3268
4	1	(Austria) Klaus Bachler (France) Patrick Pilet	3230
5		(United Kingdom) Ross Gunn (Spain) Alex Riberas	3122

GTD Drivers' Championship standings
Pos.	+/–	Driver	Points
1		(United States) Bryan Sellers (United States) Madison Snow	3331
2		(Canada) Roman De Angelis (Denmark) Marco Sørensen	2926
3		(United States) Aaron Telitz (United States) Frankie Montecalvo	2747
4		(United States) Brendan Iribe (Denmark) Frederik Schandorff	2709
5		(United States) Robby Foley (United States) Patrick Gallagher	2588

- Note: Only the top five positions are included for all sets of standings.

GTP Teams' Championship standings
Pos.	+/–	Team	Points
1	1	(United States) #31 Whelen Engineering Racing	2460
2	1	(United States) #10 WTR with Andretti Autosport	2457
3	1	(Germany) #6 Porsche Penske Motorsport	2455
4	1	(United States) #25 BMW M Team RLL	2422
5	2	(Germany) #7 Porsche Penske Motorsport	2387

LMP2 Teams' Championship standings
Pos.	+/–	Team	Points
1	1	(France) #11 TDS Racing	1680
2	1	(United States) #52 PR1/Mathiasen Motorsports	1660
3		(United States) #04 CrowdStrike Racing by APR	1580
4		(United States) #8 Tower Motorsports	1547
5		(France) #35 TDS Racing	1482

LMP3 Teams' Championship standings
Pos.	+/–	Team	Points
1		(United States) #74 Riley Motorsports	1838
2	2	(Canada) #17 AWA	1594
3		(United States) #30 Jr III Motorsports	1565
4	2	(Canada) #13 AWA	1534
5		(United States) #33 Sean Creech Motorsport	1415

GTD Pro Teams' Championship standings
Pos.	+/–	Team	Points
1		(United States) #14 Vasser Sullivan Racing	3495
2		(United States) #3 Corvette Racing	3307
3	1	(United States) #79 WeatherTech Racing	3268
4	1	(Canada) #9 Pfaff Motorsports	3230
5		(United States) #23 Heart of Racing Team	3122

GTD Teams' Championship standings
Pos.	+/–	Team	Points
1		(United States) #1 Paul Miller Racing	3331
2		(United States) #27 Heart of Racing Team	2926
3		(United States) #12 Vasser Sullivan Racing	2747
4		(United Kingdom) #70 Inception Racing	2709
5		(United States) #96 Turner Motorsport	2588

- Note: Only the top five positions are included for all sets of standings.

GTP Manufacturers' Championship standings
Pos.	+/–	Manufacturer	Points
1	2	(Germany) Porsche	2752
2	1	(United States) Cadillac	2744
3	1	(Japan) Acura	2691
4		(Germany) BMW	2688

GTD Pro Manufacturers' Championship standings
Pos.	+/–	Manufacturer	Points
1		(Japan) Lexus	3495
2		(United States) Chevrolet	3307
3	1	(Germany) Mercedes-AMG	3268
4	1	(Germany) Porsche	3230
5		(United Kingdom) Aston Martin	3133

GTD Manufacturers' Championship standings
Pos.	+/–	Manufacturer	Points
1		(Germany) BMW	3540
2		(United Kingdom) Aston Martin	3169
3	3	(Germany) Mercedes-AMG	3040
4	1	(Germany) Porsche	3034
5	2	(Japan) Lexus	3029

- Note: Only the top five positions are included for all sets of standings.

IMSA SportsCar Championship
Previous race: 2023 Michelin GT Challenge at VIR	2023 season	Next race: 2023 Petit Le Mans
