= CDNetworks =

Content delivery network

- Type: Private
- Industry: Content delivery network, Cloud security
- Founded: 2000; 26 years ago
- Headquarters: Singapore
- Products: Global content delivery network for static and dynamic content Managed DNS; Media acceleration DDoS protection Cloud storage Web application firewall (WAF); Enterprise Application Security; Bot Manager
- Number of employees: 400+
- Divisions: USA, EMEA, Japan, China, South Korea, India, Canada, Hong Kong, Russia, Malaysia, Singapore
- Website: cdnetworks.com

Founded in 2000, CDNetworks is a full-service content delivery network (CDN) which provides technology, network infrastructure, and customer services for the delivery of Internet content and applications. The company is positioning itself as a multinational provider of content delivery services, with a particular emphasis on emerging Internet markets, including South America, India and China. The company's content delivery network consists of 1,500 Point of Presence (PoPs) on five continents. Services include CDN, video acceleration, DDoS protection, cloud storage, cloud access security broker (CASB), web application firewall (WAF) and managed DNS with cloud load balancing. Key differentiators include a large number of global PoPs, good network presence in China and Russia, and high-profile clients such as Forbes, Samsung and Hyundai. CDNetworks has offices in the U.S., South Korea, China, Japan, UK and Singapore.

CDNetworks has changed their logo colours in 2018 from blue green to a multi-coloured one, adding a tagline "Accelerate, Secure, Control".

The headquarters have been relocated to Singapore at the end of 2018 from Hong Kong.

== History ==
On December 20, 2007, CDNetworks raised $96.5 million from Oak Investment Partners, Shinhan Private Equity and Goldman Sachs International.

On February 25, 2009, CDNetworks acquired Panther Express.

On October 21, 2011, Japanese Telco KDDI bought Content Delivery Network CDNetworks for $167 million.

On 26 March, 2017, Wangsu Science & Technology bought 100% of shares from KDDI for $185.72 million.

== See also ==
- Software as a service
- List of managed DNS providers
