= Alexandra Wilkis Wilson =

American entrepreneur

- Born: Alexandra Wilkis; New York City, New York
- Education: Harvard University (AB, MBA)
- Occupations: Entrepreneur and Investor
- Relatives: Alan Wilkis, Brother

Alexandra Wilkis Wilson, born in New York City, is an American entrepreneur and investor who co-founded the companies the Gilt Groupe, GlamSquad, and Fitz. She is currently co-founder and Managing Partner at Clerisy, a consumer-focused growth equity fund.

== Early life and education ==
Alexandra Wilkis Wilson was born and raised in New York City. She attended The Brearley School, Phillips Exeter Academy, Harvard College, where she graduated magna cum laude, and Harvard Business School.

Wilkis Wilson grew up in a bilingual home (Spanish/English) and later learned French, Portuguese and Italian. She studied piano at the Manhattan School of Music and played competitively until about the 10th grade. She credits music as being a strong early influence in her life and in her dedication to entrepreneurial ventures. Her brother Alan Wilkis is the founder of the American Music Project, Big Data.

== Career ==
Wilkis Wilson began her career working in investment banking at Merrill Lynch for three years, before returning to Harvard to earn an MBA. She then entered the Louis Vuitton management training program, which included working the sales floor. Subsequently, she worked for two years managing retail operations for Bulgari.

Wilkis Wilson co-founded the Gilt Groupe in 2007, a flashsale company that offers luxury goods for sale at significant discounts, but only for brief windows of time. In 2012, Wilkis Wilson and cofounder Alexis Maybank, a classmate from Harvard Business School, published a book on Gilt's founding, By Invitation Only: How We Built Gilt and Changed the Way Millions Shop. At one point the company was valued at a billion dollars, making it a "unicorn", a venture capital slang term for a startup valued at a billion dollars, but sold to Saks Fifth Avenue parent company Hudson's Bay Company for $250 million in 2016. Wilkis Wilson left the company in 2014.

In September 2014, she became co-founder and CEO of GlamSquad, a mobile styling company "which offers on-demand beauty services through an integrated app." Clients can use an app to book hair and makeup artists for house calls--"the Uber of beauty services." The company had $8 million in sales in the first year, and raised $24 million in funding, as of February 2017. It operates in New York City, Los Angeles, Miami and Washington, DC.

In March 2017, Wilkis Wilson launched a startup called Fitz, a service that offers an in-person wardrobe consultation and then follow-up advice on shopping. Fitz was sold to Tradesy, the online peer-to-peer resale marketplace for women's luxury and designer contemporary fashion, in February 2018. In February 2018, Wilkis Wilson was recruited by Boston Consulting Group to join Allergan as the SVP, Consumer Strategy & Innovation. She led new efforts in revolutionizing digital marketing and DTC initiatives for Allergan's leading aesthetics portfolio including Botox, Juvederm and Coolsculpting. She left Allergan in July 2020 after the company was acquired by AbbVie Inc. for $63B.

Today Wilkis Wilson is co-founder and Managing Partner at Clerisy, the growth equity fund which she co-founded with Lisa Myers, formerly a partner at L. Catterton and a 20-year veteran of Templeton. Clerisy's growing portfolio includes investments in Dormify, UNION and CleanCo.

Wilkis Wilson has been an advisor and investor to over 80 tech startups including but not limited to Birchbox, Carbon38, Flow Commerce, Rent the Runway, and Tula. She has been an advisor to consumer tech Venture Capital funds including Forerunner Ventures and Montage Ventures.

== Personal life ==
Wilkis Wilson is married and has two children. She presently resides in Miami, FL.
