= 2022 Petit Le Mans =

Sportscar endurance race in Georgia, US

The Track map of Road Atlanta

The 2022 Petit Le Mans (known as the 2022 MOTUL Petit Le Mans for sponsorship reasons) was the 25th running of the Petit Le Mans, and was held on October 1, 2022. It was the 12th and final race in the 2022 IMSA SportsCar Championship, and the 4th race of the 2022 Michelin Endurance Cup. The race was held at Road Atlanta in Braselton, Georgia. The event was the last ever race for the DPi Class.

== Background ==
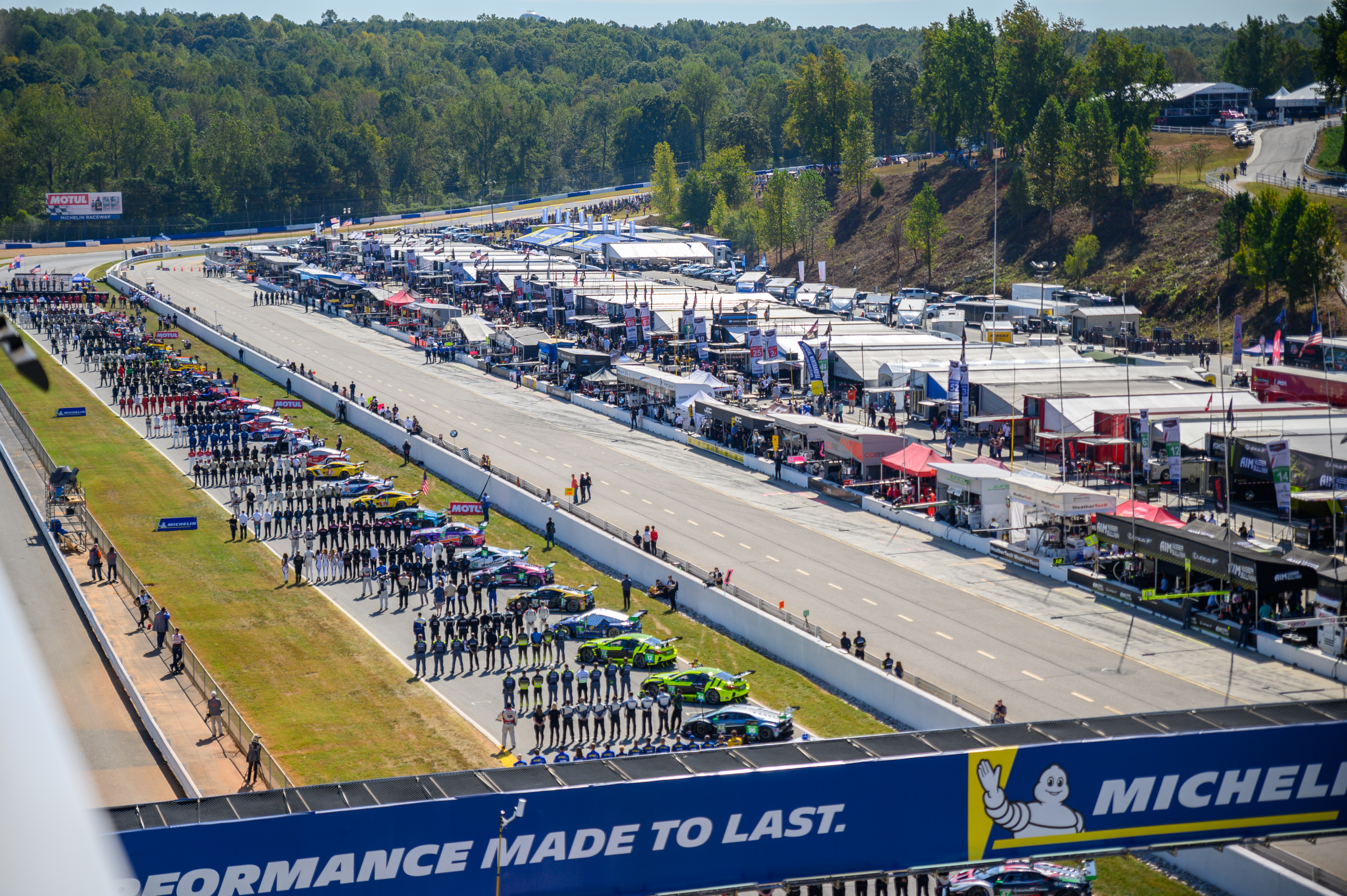
right Michelin Raceway Road Atlanta, where the race was held.

International Motor Sports Association's (IMSA) president John Doonan confirmed the race was part of the schedule for the 2022 IMSA SportsCar Championship (IMSA SCC) in August 2021. It was the ninth consecutive year the event was held as part of the WeatherTech SportsCar Championship. The 2022 Petit Le Mans was the final of twelve scheduled sports car races of 2022 by IMSA, and it was the last of four rounds held as part of the Michelin Endurance Cup. The race took place at the 12-turn, 2.540-mile (4.088 km) Road Atlanta in Braselton, Georgia on October 1, 2023.

As the final event of the 2022 season, the race marked the swansong for the DPi class. First introduced in 2017, the class enjoyed six seasons of success before making way for the new-for-2023 GTP class. Wayne Taylor, whose team scored the first DPi championship in 2017, described the class as one of the best in North American sports car racing history. Wayne Taylor Racing competed from 2017 to 2020 with the Cadillac DPi-V.R, and from 2021 to 2022 with the Acura ARX-05; the only two manufacturers which took to the grid for the 2022 running of Petit Le Mans. Nissan, who exited following the 2019 season, and Mazda, who pulled their entry after 2021, did not take part. The championship battle in the class was still on, with just 19 points separating the Acura entries from Wayne Taylor Racing and Meyer Shank Racing entering the race weekend.

The Porsche 911 GT3 R and Ferrari 488 GT3 also entered their final IMSA events, ahead of the switch to new-generation GT3 machinery for both manufacturers and their respective customers in 2023. Porsche would introduce a new GT3 offering based on the 992 model, while Ferrari would transition to an entry based on the Ferrari 296.

The event marked the 25th anniversary of the first Petit Le Mans, held in 1998. The winners of the race's inaugural running, Eric van de Poele, Wayne Taylor and Emmanuel Collard, served as grand marshals for the 2022 event.

The race was initially feared to be threatened by Hurricane Ian, with serious concerns expressed early in the preceding week that the storm could threaten the race's running. However, with the changing course of the storm, high winds early in the weekend proved the only major effect on the event's 25th running.

On September 21, 2022, IMSA released the latest technical bulletin outlining Balance of Performance for the event. No changes were made to cars in any of the four classes eligible for BoP adjustments.

Heading into the final race of the season, Filipe Albuquerque and Ricky Taylor led the DPi Drivers' Championship with 3066 points; the duo held a 19 point advantage over Tom Blomqvist and Oliver Jarvis. In LMP2, John Farano led the Drivers' Championship with 1640 points; 33 ahead of Ryan Dalziel and Dwight Merriman. With 1716 points, Jon Bennett and Colin Braun led the Drivers' Championship by 83 points over Gar Robinson. Matt Campbell and Mathieu Jaminet led the GTD Pro Drivers' Championship with 3173 points, 265 points ahead of Antonio García and Jordan Taylor. In GTD, Roman De Angelis led the Drivers' Championship with 2630 points; 45 points ahead of Stevan McAleer in second position followed by Ryan Hardwick and Jan Heylen with 2573 points. Acura, Porsche, and BMW were leading their respective Manufactures' Championships while Wayne Taylor Racing, PR1/Mathiasen Motorsports, CORE Autosport, Pfaff Motorsports, and Heart of Racing Team each led their own Teams' Championships.

The event also preceded an IMSA-sanctioned joint test for the LMDh entries, attended by Acura, BMW, and Cadillac. Of the 2023 LMDh manufacturers, Porsche were the only entrant that did not take part.

=== Entries ===
A total of 43 cars took part in the event, split across five classes. 7 were entered in DPi, 6 in LMP2, 8 in LMP3, 7 in GTD Pro, and 15 in GTD.

DPi saw the return of competitors taking part in IMSA's Endurance Cup championship. The Ally Cadillac Racing entry returned in line with its Endurance Cup schedule, while all six full-season DPi teams added a third driver. Scott Dixon returned to Cadillac Racing's #01 entry, while Ryan Hunter-Reay guested in the team's No. 02 after last appearing at Sebring. Loïc Duval continued in his endurance role for JDC-Miller MotorSports, as did Mike Conway and Hélio Castroneves for Whelen Engineering Racing and Meyer Shank Racing respectively. Toyota factory driver Brendon Hartley joined Wayne Taylor Racing, replacing Will Stevens.

Seven cars were listed on the preliminary LMP2 entry list, but the late withdrawal of the Racing Team Nederland entry following Frits van Eerd's arrest and subsequent release on suspicion of money laundering reduced the final entry list to six. Indy Lights driver Christian Rasmussen joined Era Motorsport for the first time, while other endurance additions included Sebastián Montoya for DragonSpeed, Rui Andrade for Tower Motorsport, Tristan Nunez for the PR1/Mathiasen Motorsports No. 11 Oreca, and Fabio Scherer at High Class Racing.

LMP3 featured a number of changes from the preliminary entry list. FastMD Racing initially were set to return with Colin Noble, Adam Ali, and Max Hanratty, but were withdrawn late on. The Forty7 Motorsports No. 7 was also withdrawn, with all three of their scheduled drivers spread across AWA's two entries. Mühlner Motorsport also withdrew their scheduled entry. Other notable additions included Tyler Maxson for Performance Tech Motorsports, and Nico Pino for Sean Creech Motorsport.

GTD Pro included the addition of Risi Competizione's Ferrari 488, as well as WeatherTech Racing's return following Cooper MacNeil's withdrawal from the No. 79 entry. Nicky Catsburg returned for Corvette Racing, as did Felipe Nasr and Kyle Kirkwood for Pfaff Motorsports and Vasser Sullivan Racing respectively. Jesse Krohn and Tom Gamble joined BMW Team RLL and the Heart of Racing Team, respectively, as well.

15 cars were entered in GTD, decreased by one following the withdrawal of Crucial Motorsports' McLaren 720S GT3. Ulysse de Pauw was drafted into Cetilar Racing's entry with endurance driver Antonio Fuoco taking part in the GT World Challenge Europe season finale in Europe, while Sebastian Priaulx's addition to the Inception Racing McLaren marked the only other brand new addition to a GTD driver roster.

== Practice ==
There were three practice sessions preceding the start of the race on Saturday, all three on Thursday. The first session on Thursday morning lasted 90 minutes. The second session on Thursday afternoon lasted 105 minutes. The final session on Thursday evening lasted 90 minutes.

=== Practice 1 ===
The first practice session took place at 9:50 AM ET on Thursday and ended with Earl Bamber topping the charts for Cadillac Racing, with a lap time of 1:09.583.

Pos.	Class	No.	Team	Driver	Time	Gap
1	DPi	02	Cadillac Racing	Earl Bamber	1:09.583	_
2	DPi	60	Meyer Shank Racing with Curb-Agajanian	Tom Blomqvist	1:09.915	+0.332
3	DPi	01	Cadillac Racing	Sébastien Bourdais	1:10.119	+0.536

=== Practice 2 ===
The second practice session took place at 2:55 PM ET on Thursday and ended with Sébastien Bourdais topping the charts for Cadillac Racing, with a lap time of 1:09.040.

Pos.	Class	No.	Team	Driver	Time	Gap
1	DPi	01	Cadillac Racing	Sébastien Bourdais	1:09.040	_
2	DPi	60	Meyer Shank Racing with Curb-Agajanian	Tom Blomqvist	1:09.342	+0.302
3	DPi	48	Ally Cadillac Racing	Kamui Kobayashi	1:09.425	+0.385

=== Practice 3 ===
The night practice session took place at 7:30 PM ET on Thursday and ended with Earl Bamber again topping the charts for Cadillac Racing, with a lap time of 1:09.880.

Pos.	Class	No.	Team	Driver	Time	Gap
1	DPi	02	Cadillac Racing	Earl Bamber	1:09.880	_
2	DPi	5	JDC-Miller MotorSports	Tristan Vautier	1:10.003	+0.123
3	DPi	01	Cadillac Racing	Renger van der Zande	1:10.162	+0.282

== Qualifying ==
Friday's afternoon qualifying was broken into three sessions, with one session for the DPi and LMP2, LMP3, GTD Pro and GTD classes, which lasted for 15 minutes each, and a ten minute interval between the sessions. The rules dictated that all teams nominated a driver to qualify their cars, with the Pro-Am (LMP2/LMP3/GTD) classes requiring a Bronze/Silver Rated Driver to qualify the car. The competitors' fastest lap times determined the starting order. IMSA then arranged the grid to put DPis ahead of the LMP2, LMP3, GTD Pro, and GTD cars.

Tom Blomqvist took overall pole for Meyer Shank Racing, reducing the championship points gap to 14 points heading into the race.

=== Qualifying results ===
Pole positions in each class are indicated in bold and by ‡.

Pos.	Class	No.	Team	Driver	Time	Gap	Grid
1	**DPi**	**60**	**(United States) Meyer Shank Racing with Curb-Agajanian**	**(United Kingdom) Tom Blomqvist**	**1:08.555**	**_**	1‡
2	DPi	02	(United States) Cadillac Racing	(New Zealand) Earl Bamber	1:08.788	+0.233	2
3	DPi	10	(United States) WTR - Konica Minolta Acura	(United States) Ricky Taylor	1:08.802	+0.247	3
4	DPi	5	(United States) JDC-Miller MotorSports	(France) Tristan Vautier	1:08.853	+0.298	4
5	DPi	01	(United States) Cadillac Racing	(France) Sébastien Bourdais	1:08.905	+0.350	5
6	DPi	48	(United States) Ally Cadillac Racing	(Japan) Kamui Kobayashi	1:08.984	+0.429	6
7	DPi	31	(United States) Whelen Engineering Racing	(Brazil) Pipo Derani	1:09.075	+0.520	7
8	**LMP2**	**11**	**(United States) PR1/Mathiasen Motorsports**	**(United States) Steven Thomas**	**1:11.939**	**+3.384**	8‡
9	LMP2	20	(Denmark) High Class Racing	(Denmark) Dennis Andersen	1:12.021	+3.466	9
10	LMP2	52	(United States) PR1/Mathiasen Motorsports	(United States) Ben Keating	1:12.328	+3.773	10
11	LMP2	8	(United States) Tower Motorsport	(Canada) John Farano	1:12.360	+3.805	11
12	LMP2	81	(United States) DragonSpeed USA	(Sweden) Henrik Hedman	1:13.570	+5.015	12
13	LMP2	18	(United States) Era Motorsport	(United States) Dwight Merriman	1:13.896	+5.341	13
14	**LMP3**	**74**	**(United States) Riley Motorsports**	**(Netherlands) Kay van Berlo**	**1:15.517**	**+6.962**	14‡
15	LMP3	33	(United States) Sean Creech Motorsport	(Denmark) Malthe Jakobsen	1:15.625	+7.070	15
16	LMP3	36	(United States) Andretti Autosport	(United States) Jarett Andretti	1:17.030	+8.475	16
17	LMP3	13	(Canada) AWA	(Canada) Orey Fidani	1:17.809	+9.254	17
18	LMP3	54	(United States) CORE Autosport	(United States) Jon Bennett	1:17.813	+9.258	18
19	LMP3	30	(United States) Jr III Racing	(United States) Ari Balogh	1:18.417	+9.862	19
20	LMP3	38	(United States) Performance Tech Motorsports	(United States) Dan Goldburg	1:18.693	+10.138	20 (Note: The no. 38 Performance Tech Motorsports entry was moved to the back of the LMP3 class after changing their starting tires.)
21	**GTD Pro**	**14**	**(United States) Vasser Sullivan Racing**	**(United Kingdom) Jack Hawksworth**	**1:18.835**	**+10.280**	22‡
22	GTD Pro	23	(United States) Heart of Racing Team	(Spain) Alex Riberas	1:19.043	+10.488	23
23	**GTD**	**1**	**(United States) Paul Miller Racing**	**(United States) Madison Snow**	**1:19.118**	**+10.563**	24‡
24	GTD Pro	25	(United States) BMW M Team RLL	(Finland) Jesse Krohn	1:19.279	+10.724	25
25	GTD Pro	62	(United States) Risi Competizione	(United Kingdom) James Calado	1:19.352	+10.797	26
26	LMP3	76	(Canada) AWA	(Canada) Anthony Mantella	1:19.357	+10.802	21 (Note: The no. 76 AWA entry was moved to the back of the LMP3 class after changing their starting tires.)
27	GTD Pro	3	(United States) Corvette Racing	(Spain) Antonio Garcia	1:19.444	+10.889	27
28	GTD	39	(United States) CarBahn with Peregrine Racing	(United States) Robert Megennis	1:19.506	+10.951	28
29	GTD	42	(United States) NTE Sport/SSR	(United States) Jaden Conwright	1:19.522	+10.967	29
30	GTD	27	(United States) Heart of Racing Team	(Canada) Roman De Angelis	1:19.546	+10.991	30
31	GTD	12	(United States) Vasser Sullivan Racing	(United States) Richard Heistand	1:19.560	+11.005	31
32	GTD Pro	79	(United States) WeatherTech Racing	(Germany) Maximilian Buhk	1:19.620	+11.065	32
33	GTD	32	(United States) Team Korthoff Motorsports	(United Kingdom) Stevan McAleer	1:19.823	+11.268	33
34	GTD Pro	9	(Canada) Pfaff Motorsports	(Brazil) Felipe Nasr	1:19.942	+11.387	34
35	GTD	57	(United States) Winward Racing	(United States) Russell Ward	1:19.977	+11.422	35
36	GTD	21	(Italy) AF Corse	(United Kingdom) Simon Mann	1:20.022	+11.467	36
37	GTD	16	(United States) Wright Motorsports	(Canada) Zacharie Robichon	1:20.025	+11.470	37
38	GTD	47	(Italy) Cetilar Racing	(Italy) Giorgio Sernagiotto	1:20.041	+11.486	38
39	GTD	70	(United Kingdom) Inception Racing with Optimum Motorsport	(United States) Brendan Iribe	1:20.390	+11.835	39
40	GTD	44	(United States) Magnus Racing	(United States) John Potter	1:21.431	+12.876	40
41	GTD	99	(United States) Team Hardpoint	(United States) Nick Boulle	1:21.470	+12.915	41
42	GTD	66	(United States) Gradient Racing	Times disallowed			43
43	GTD	96	(United States) Turner Motorsport	No time established			42

== Warm-Up ==
The morning warm-up took place at 9:15 AM ET on Saturday and ended with Loïc Duval topping the charts for JDC-Miller MotorSports, with a lap time of 1:10.406.

Pos.	Class	No.	Team	Driver	Time	Gap
1	DPi	5	JDC-Miller MotorSports	Loïc Duval	1:10.406	_
2	DPi	01	Cadillac Racing	Scott Dixon	1:10.596	+0.190
3	DPi	02	Cadillac Racing	Alex Lynn	1:10.873	+0.467

== Race ==
=== Post-Race ===
Blomqvist and Jarvis took the DPi Drivers' Championship with 3422 points. They were 86 points clear of Filipe Albuquerque and Ricky Taylor. With 2018 points, Farno won the LMP2 Drivers' Championship, 126 points ahead of Dalziel and Merriman. With 2002 points, Bennett and Braun won the LMP3 Drivers' Championship, 54 points ahead of Robinson. Campbell and Jaminet took the GTD Pro Drivers' Championship with 3947 points. They were 220 points clear of Barnicoat in second. Antonio García and Jordan Taylor were third with 3194 points. De Angelis won the GTD Drivers' Championship with 2898 points, 23 points ahead of Hardwick and Heylend. McAleer was third with 2860 points. Acura, Porsche, and BMW won their respective Manufactures' Championships, while Meyer Shank Racing, Tower Motorsport, CORE Autosport, Pfaff Motorsports, and Heart of Racing Team won their respective Teams' Championships.

=== Race results ===
Class winners denoted in bold and with ‡

Pos	Class	No.	Team / Entrant	Drivers	Chassis	Laps	Time/Retired
Pos	Class	No.	Team / Entrant	Drivers	Engine	Laps	Time/Retired
1	**DPi**	**60**	**(United States) Meyer Shank Racing with Curb-Agajanian**	**(United Kingdom) Tom Blomqvist (Brazil) Hélio Castroneves (United Kingdom) Oliver Jarvis**	**Acura ARX-05**	**423**	**10:00:14.591‡**
1	**DPi**	**60**	**(United States) Meyer Shank Racing with Curb-Agajanian**	**(United Kingdom) Tom Blomqvist (Brazil) Hélio Castroneves (United Kingdom) Oliver Jarvis**	**Acura AR35TT 3.5 L Turbo V6**	**423**	**10:00:14.591‡**
2	DPi	31	(United States) Whelen Engineering Racing	(United Kingdom) Mike Conway (Brazil) Pipo Derani (France) Olivier Pla	Cadillac DPi-V.R	423	+4.369
2	DPi	31	(United States) Whelen Engineering Racing	(United Kingdom) Mike Conway (Brazil) Pipo Derani (France) Olivier Pla	Cadillac 5.5 L V8	423	+4.369
3	DPi	48	(United States) Ally Cadillac Racing	(United States) Jimmie Johnson (Japan) Kamui Kobayashi (Germany) Mike Rockenfeller	Cadillac DPi-V.R	422	+1 Lap
3	DPi	48	(United States) Ally Cadillac Racing	(United States) Jimmie Johnson (Japan) Kamui Kobayashi (Germany) Mike Rockenfeller	Cadillac 5.5 L V8	422	+1 Lap
4	DPi	01	(United States) Cadillac Racing	(France) Sébastien Bourdais (New Zealand) Scott Dixon (Netherlands) Renger van der Zande	Cadillac DPi-V.R	419	+4 Laps
4	DPi	01	(United States) Cadillac Racing	(France) Sébastien Bourdais (New Zealand) Scott Dixon (Netherlands) Renger van der Zande	Cadillac 5.5 L V8	419	+4 Laps
5	**LMP2**	**8**	**(United States) Tower Motorsport**	**(Portugal) Rui Andrade (Switzerland) Louis Delétraz (Canada) John Farano**	**Oreca 07**	**418**	**+5 Laps‡**
5	**LMP2**	**8**	**(United States) Tower Motorsport**	**(Portugal) Rui Andrade (Switzerland) Louis Delétraz (Canada) John Farano**	**Gibson Technology GK428 4.2 L V8**	**418**	**+5 Laps‡**
6	LMP2	81	(United States) DragonSpeed USA	(Sweden) Henrik Hedman (Colombia) Juan Pablo Montoya (Colombia) Sebastián Montoya	Oreca 07	418	+5 Laps
6	LMP2	81	(United States) DragonSpeed USA	(Sweden) Henrik Hedman (Colombia) Juan Pablo Montoya (Colombia) Sebastián Montoya	Gibson Technology GK428 4.2 L V8	418	+5 Laps
7	LMP2	11	(United States) PR1/Mathiasen Motorsports	(United States) Tristan Nunez (United States) Josh Pierson (United States) Steven Thomas	Oreca 07	418	+5 Laps
7	LMP2	11	(United States) PR1/Mathiasen Motorsports	(United States) Tristan Nunez (United States) Josh Pierson (United States) Steven Thomas	Gibson Technology GK428 4.2 L V8	418	+5 Laps
8	DPi	02	(United States) Cadillac Racing	(New Zealand) Earl Bamber (United States) Ryan Hunter-Reay (United Kingdom) Alex Lynn	Cadillac DPi-V.R	418	+5 Laps
8	DPi	02	(United States) Cadillac Racing	(New Zealand) Earl Bamber (United States) Ryan Hunter-Reay (United Kingdom) Alex Lynn	Cadillac 5.5 L V8	418	+5 Laps
9 DNF	DPi	10	(United States) WTR - Konica Minolta Acura	(Portugal) Filipe Albuquerque (New Zealand) Brendon Hartley (United States) Ricky Taylor	Acura ARX-05	414	Accident
9 DNF	DPi	10	(United States) WTR - Konica Minolta Acura	(Portugal) Filipe Albuquerque (New Zealand) Brendon Hartley (United States) Ricky Taylor	Acura AR35TT 3.5 L Turbo V6	414	Accident
10	LMP2	20	(Denmark) High Class Racing	(Denmark) Dennis Andersen (Denmark) Anders Fjordbach (Switzerland) Fabio Scherer	Oreca 07	414	+9 Laps
10	LMP2	20	(Denmark) High Class Racing	(Denmark) Dennis Andersen (Denmark) Anders Fjordbach (Switzerland) Fabio Scherer	Gibson Technology GK428 4.2 L V8	414	+9 Laps
11	**LMP3**	**36**	**(United States) Andretti Autosport**	**(United States) Jarett Andretti (Australia) Josh Burdon (Colombia) Gabby Chaves**	**Ligier JS P320**	**401**	**+22 Laps‡**
11	**LMP3**	**36**	**(United States) Andretti Autosport**	**(United States) Jarett Andretti (Australia) Josh Burdon (Colombia) Gabby Chaves**	**Nissan VK56DE 5.6 L V8**	**401**	**+22 Laps‡**
12	LMP3	30	(United States) Jr III Racing	(United States) Ari Balogh (Canada) Garett Grist (United States) Nolan Siegel	Ligier JS P320	401	+22 Laps
12	LMP3	30	(United States) Jr III Racing	(United States) Ari Balogh (Canada) Garett Grist (United States) Nolan Siegel	Nissan VK56DE 5.6 L V8	401	+22 Laps
13	LMP3	33	(United States) Sean Creech Motorsport	(Portugal) João Barbosa (Denmark) Malthe Jakobsen (Chile) Nico Pino	Ligier JS P320	401	+22 Laps
13	LMP3	33	(United States) Sean Creech Motorsport	(Portugal) João Barbosa (Denmark) Malthe Jakobsen (Chile) Nico Pino	Nissan VK56DE 5.6 L V8	401	+22 Laps
14	LMP3	74	(United States) Riley Motorsports	(Netherlands) Kay van Berlo (Brazil) Felipe Fraga (United States) Gar Robinson	Ligier JS P320	400	+23 Laps
14	LMP3	74	(United States) Riley Motorsports	(Netherlands) Kay van Berlo (Brazil) Felipe Fraga (United States) Gar Robinson	Nissan VK56DE 5.6 L V8	400	+23 Laps
15	LMP3	54	(United States) CORE Autosport	(United States) Jon Bennett (United States) Colin Braun (United States) George Kurtz	Ligier JS P320	399	+24 Laps
15	LMP3	54	(United States) CORE Autosport	(United States) Jon Bennett (United States) Colin Braun (United States) George Kurtz	Nissan VK56DE 5.6 L V8	399	+24 Laps
16	LMP3	76	(Canada) AWA	(Canada) Anthony Mantella (Canada) Kyle Marcelli (United States) Josh Sarchet	Duqueine D-08	397	+26 Laps
16	LMP3	76	(Canada) AWA	(Canada) Anthony Mantella (Canada) Kyle Marcelli (United States) Josh Sarchet	Nissan VK56DE 5.6 L V8	397	+26 Laps
17	LMP3	13	(Canada) AWA	(United Kingdom) Matthew Bell (Canada) Orey Fidani (Germany) Lars Kern	Duqueine D-08	395	+28 Laps
17	LMP3	13	(Canada) AWA	(United Kingdom) Matthew Bell (Canada) Orey Fidani (Germany) Lars Kern	Nissan VK56DE 5.6 L V8	395	+28 Laps
18	**GTD**	**66**	**(United States) Gradient Racing**	**(United Kingdom) Till Bechtolsheimer (Germany) Mario Farnbacher (Barbados) Kyffin Simpson**	**Acura NSX GT3 Evo22**	**387**	**+36 Laps‡**
18	**GTD**	**66**	**(United States) Gradient Racing**	**(United Kingdom) Till Bechtolsheimer (Germany) Mario Farnbacher (Barbados) Kyffin Simpson**	**Acura 3.5 L Turbo V6**	**387**	**+36 Laps‡**
19	GTD	70	(United Kingdom) Inception Racing with Optimum Motorsport	(United States) Brendan Iribe (South Africa) Jordan Pepper (Guernsey) Sebastian Priaulx	McLaren 720S GT3	387	+36 Laps
19	GTD	70	(United Kingdom) Inception Racing with Optimum Motorsport	(United States) Brendan Iribe (South Africa) Jordan Pepper (Guernsey) Sebastian Priaulx	McLaren M840T 4.0 L Turbo V8	387	+36 Laps
20	GTD	96	(United States) Turner Motorsport	(United States) Bill Auberlen (United States) Michael Dinan (United States) Robby Foley	BMW M4 GT3	386	+37 Laps
20	GTD	96	(United States) Turner Motorsport	(United States) Bill Auberlen (United States) Michael Dinan (United States) Robby Foley	BMW S58B30T0 3.0 L Twin Turbo I6	386	+37 Laps
21	GTD	16	(United States) Wright Motorsports	(United States) Ryan Hardwick (Belgium) Jan Heylen (Canada) Zacharie Robichon	Porsche 911 GT3 R	386	+37 Laps
21	GTD	16	(United States) Wright Motorsports	(United States) Ryan Hardwick (Belgium) Jan Heylen (Canada) Zacharie Robichon	Porsche 4.0 L Flat-6	386	+37 Laps
22	GTD	1	(United States) Paul Miller Racing	(Sweden) Erik Johansson (United States) Bryan Sellers (United States) Madison Snow	BMW M4 GT3	386	+37 Laps
22	GTD	1	(United States) Paul Miller Racing	(Sweden) Erik Johansson (United States) Bryan Sellers (United States) Madison Snow	BMW S58B30T0 3.0 L Twin Turbo I6	386	+37 Laps
23	**GTD; Pro**	**14**	**(United States) Vasser Sullivan Racing**	**(United Kingdom) Ben Barnicoat (United Kingdom) Jack Hawksworth (United States) Kyle Kirkwood**	**Lexus RC F GT3**	**386**	**+37 Laps‡**
23	**GTD; Pro**	**14**	**(United States) Vasser Sullivan Racing**	**(United Kingdom) Ben Barnicoat (United Kingdom) Jack Hawksworth (United States) Kyle Kirkwood**	**Toyota 2UR 5.0 L V8**	**386**	**+37 Laps‡**
24	GTD; Pro	25	(United States) BMW M Team RLL	(United States) Connor De Phillippi (United States) John Edwards (Finland) Jesse Krohn	BMW M4 GT3	386	+37 Laps
24	GTD; Pro	25	(United States) BMW M Team RLL	(United States) Connor De Phillippi (United States) John Edwards (Finland) Jesse Krohn	BMW S58B30T0 3.0 L Twin Turbo I6	386	+37 Laps
25	GTD; Pro	9	(Canada) Pfaff Motorsports	(Australia) Matt Campbell (France) Mathieu Jaminet (Brazil) Felipe Nasr	Porsche 911 GT3 R	386	+37 Laps
25	GTD; Pro	9	(Canada) Pfaff Motorsports	(Australia) Matt Campbell (France) Mathieu Jaminet (Brazil) Felipe Nasr	Porsche 4.0 L Flat-6	386	+37 Laps
26	GTD; Pro	23	(United States) Heart of Racing Team	(United Kingdom) Tom Gamble (United Kingdom) Ross Gunn (Spain) Alex Riberas	Aston Martin Vantage AMR GT3	386	+37 Laps
26	GTD; Pro	23	(United States) Heart of Racing Team	(United Kingdom) Tom Gamble (United Kingdom) Ross Gunn (Spain) Alex Riberas	Aston Martin 4.0 L Turbo V8	386	+37 Laps
27	GTD; Pro	3	(United States) Corvette Racing	(Netherlands) Nicky Catsburg (Spain) Antonio García (United States) Jordan Taylor	Chevrolet Corvette C8.R GTD	386	+37 Laps
27	GTD; Pro	3	(United States) Corvette Racing	(Netherlands) Nicky Catsburg (Spain) Antonio García (United States) Jordan Taylor	Chevrolet 5.5 L V8	386	+37 Laps
28	GTD	32	(United States) Team Korthoff Motorsports	(United Kingdom) Stevan McAleer (Germany) Dirk Müller (United States) Mike Skeen	Mercedes-AMG GT3 Evo	385	+38 Laps
28	GTD	32	(United States) Team Korthoff Motorsports	(United Kingdom) Stevan McAleer (Germany) Dirk Müller (United States) Mike Skeen	Mercedes-AMG M159 6.2 L V8	385	+38 Laps
29	GTD	27	(United States) Heart of Racing Team	(Canada) Roman De Angelis (United Kingdom) Ian James (Belgium) Maxime Martin	Aston Martin Vantage AMR GT3	385	+38 Laps
29	GTD	27	(United States) Heart of Racing Team	(Canada) Roman De Angelis (United Kingdom) Ian James (Belgium) Maxime Martin	Aston Martin 4.0 L Turbo V8	385	+38 Laps
30	GTD	21	(Italy) AF Corse	(United Kingdom) Simon Mann (Argentina) Luís Pérez Companc (Finland) Toni Vilander	Ferrari 488 GT3 Evo 2020	385	+38 Laps
30	GTD	21	(Italy) AF Corse	(United Kingdom) Simon Mann (Argentina) Luís Pérez Companc (Finland) Toni Vilander	Ferrari F154CB 3.9 L Turbo V8	385	+38 Laps
31	GTD; Pro	79	(United States) WeatherTech Racing	(Germany) Maximilian Buhk (Germany) Maximilian Götz (Canada) Mikaël Grenier	Mercedes-AMG GT3 Evo	385	+38 Laps
31	GTD; Pro	79	(United States) WeatherTech Racing	(Germany) Maximilian Buhk (Germany) Maximilian Götz (Canada) Mikaël Grenier	Mercedes-AMG M159 6.2 L V8	385	+38 Laps
32 (Note: The no. 62 Risi Competizione entry was moved to the rear of the GTD Pro classification for violating drive time rules after Daniel Serra was found to have driven more than the maximum 4 hours within a 6 hour time period.)	GTD; Pro	62	(United States) Risi Competizione	(United Kingdom) James Calado (Italy) Davide Rigon (Brazil) Daniel Serra	Ferrari 488 GT3 Evo 2020	386	+37 Laps
32	GTD; Pro	62	(United States) Risi Competizione	(United Kingdom) James Calado (Italy) Davide Rigon (Brazil) Daniel Serra	Ferrari F154CB 3.9 L Turbo V8	386	+37 Laps
33	GTD	42	(United States) NTE Sport/SSR	(United States) Jaden Conwright (Germany) Marco Holzer (United States) Don Yount	Lamborghini Huracán GT3 Evo	385	+38 Laps
33	GTD	42	(United States) NTE Sport/SSR	(United States) Jaden Conwright (Germany) Marco Holzer (United States) Don Yount	Lamborghini 5.2 L V10	385	+38 Laps
34	GTD	47	(Italy) Cetilar Racing	(Italy) Roberto Lacorte (Belgium) Ulysse de Pauw (Italy) Giorgio Sernagiotto	Ferrari 488 GT3 Evo 2020	384	+39 Laps
34	GTD	47	(Italy) Cetilar Racing	(Italy) Roberto Lacorte (Belgium) Ulysse de Pauw (Italy) Giorgio Sernagiotto	Ferrari F154CB 3.9 L Turbo V8	384	+39 Laps
35	GTD	57	(United States) Winward Racing	(Germany) Marvin Dienst (United Kingdom) Philip Ellis (United States) Russell Ward	Mercedes-AMG GT3 Evo	383	+40 Laps
35	GTD	57	(United States) Winward Racing	(Germany) Marvin Dienst (United Kingdom) Philip Ellis (United States) Russell Ward	Mercedes-AMG M159 6.2 L V8	383	+40 Laps
36	LMP3	38	(United States) Performance Tech Motorsports	(United States) Dan Goldburg (United States) Tyler Maxson (Australia) Cameron Shields	Ligier JS P320	355	+68 Laps
36	LMP3	38	(United States) Performance Tech Motorsports	(United States) Dan Goldburg (United States) Tyler Maxson (Australia) Cameron Shields	Nissan VK56DE 5.6 L V8	355	+68 Laps
37 DNF	GTD	99	(United States) Team Hardpoint	(United States) Nick Boulle (United States) Rob Ferriol (United Kingdom) Katherine Legge	Porsche 911 GT3 R	264	Accident
37 DNF	GTD	99	(United States) Team Hardpoint	(United States) Nick Boulle (United States) Rob Ferriol (United Kingdom) Katherine Legge	Porsche 4.0 L Flat-6	264	Accident
38 DNF	LMP2	18	(United States) Era Motorsport	(United Kingdom) Ryan Dalziel (United States) Dwight Merriman (Denmark) Christian Rasmussen	Oreca 07	249	Suspension
38 DNF	LMP2	18	(United States) Era Motorsport	(United Kingdom) Ryan Dalziel (United States) Dwight Merriman (Denmark) Christian Rasmussen	Gibson Technology GK428 4.2 L V8	249	Suspension
39 (Note: The no. 5 JDC-Miller MotorSports entry was given a 97-second time penalty for failing to serve a stop + 60 penalty.)DNF	DPi	5	(United States) JDC-Miller MotorSports	(France) Loïc Duval (France) Tristan Vautier (United Kingdom) Richard Westbrook	Cadillac DPi-V.R	170	Accident
39DNF	DPi	5	(United States) JDC-Miller MotorSports	(France) Loïc Duval (France) Tristan Vautier (United Kingdom) Richard Westbrook	Cadillac 5.5 L V8	170	Accident
40 DNF	GTD	12	(United States) Vasser Sullivan Racing	(United States) Richard Heistand (United States) Frankie Montecalvo (United States) Aaron Telitz	Lexus RC F GT3	158	Accident
40 DNF	GTD	12	(United States) Vasser Sullivan Racing	(United States) Richard Heistand (United States) Frankie Montecalvo (United States) Aaron Telitz	Toyota 2UR 5.0 L V8	158	Accident
41 DNF	LMP2	52	(United States) PR1/Mathiasen Motorsports	(United States) Scott Huffaker (Denmark) Mikkel Jensen (United States) Ben Keating	Oreca 07	102	Accident
41 DNF	LMP2	52	(United States) PR1/Mathiasen Motorsports	(United States) Scott Huffaker (Denmark) Mikkel Jensen (United States) Ben Keating	Gibson Technology GK428 4.2 L V8	102	Accident
42 DNF	GTD	44	(United States) Magnus Racing	(United States) Andy Lally (United States) John Potter (United States) Spencer Pumpelly	Aston Martin Vantage AMR GT3	62	Accident
42 DNF	GTD	44	(United States) Magnus Racing	(United States) Andy Lally (United States) John Potter (United States) Spencer Pumpelly	Aston Martin 4.0 L Turbo V8	62	Accident
43 DNF	GTD	39	(United States) CarBahn with Peregrine Racing	(United States) Corey Lewis (United States) Robert Megennis (United States) Jeff Westphal	Lamborghini Huracán GT3 Evo	22	Electrical
43 DNF	GTD	39	(United States) CarBahn with Peregrine Racing	(United States) Corey Lewis (United States) Robert Megennis (United States) Jeff Westphal	Lamborghini 5.2 L V10	22	Electrical

== Standings after the race ==
DPi Drivers' Championship standings
Pos.	+/–	Driver	Points
1	1	(United Kingdom) Tom Blomqvist (United Kingdom) Oliver Jarvis	3432
2	1	(Portugal) Filipe Albuquerque (United States) Ricky Taylor	3346
3		(France) Sébastien Bourdais (Netherlands) Renger van der Zande	3220
4		(United Kingdom) Alex Lynn (New Zealand) Earl Bamber	3191
5		(Brazil) Pipo Derani	3083

LMP2 Drivers' Championship standings
Pos.	+/–	Driver	Points
1		(Canada) John Farano	2018
2		(United Kingdom) Ryan Dalziel (United States) Dwight Merriman	1892
3		(United States) Steven Thomas	1882
4		(Colombia) Juan Pablo Montoya (Sweden) Henrik Hedman	1878
5		(Denmark) Dennis Andersen	1828

LMP3 Drivers' Championship standings
Pos.	+/–	Driver	Points
1		(United States) Jon Bennett (United States) Colin Braun	2002
2		(United States) Gar Robinson	1948
3		(Canada) Garett Grist (United States) Ari Balogh	1942
4		(Portugal) João Barbosa	1790
5	1	(United States) Jarett Andretti (Colombia) Gabby Chaves	1764

GTD Pro Drivers' Championship standings
Pos.	+/–	Driver	Points
1		(Australia) Matt Campbell (France) Mathieu Jaminet	3497
2	1	(United Kingdom) Ben Barnicoat	3277
3	1	(Spain) Antonio García (United States) Jordan Taylor	3194
4		(United Kingdom) Ross Gunn (Spain) Alex Riberas	3103
5		(United States) Connor De Phillippi (United States) John Edwards	2872

GTD Drivers' Championship standings
Pos.	+/–	Driver	Points
1		(Canada) Roman De Angelis	2898
2	1	(United States) Ryan Hardwick (Belgium) Jan Heylen	2875
3	1	(United Kingdom) Stevan McAleer	2860
4	1	(United States) Bill Auberlen (United States) Robby Foley	2785
5	1	(United Kingdom) Phillip Ellis (United States) Russell Ward	2714

- Note: Only the top five positions are included for all sets of standings.

DPi Teams' Championship standings
Pos.	+/–	Team	Points
1	1	(United States) #60 Meyer Shank Racing w/ Curb-Agajanian	3432
2	1	(United States) #10 WTR - Konica Minolta Acura	3346
3		(United States) #01 Cadillac Racing	3220
4		(United States) #02 Cadillac Racing	3191
5		(United States) #31 Whelen Engineering Racing	3083

LMP2 Teams' Championship standings
Pos.	+/–	Team	Points
1	1	(United States) #8 Tower Motorsport	2018
2	1	(United States) #52 PR1/Mathiasen Motorsports	1939
3		(United States) #18 Era Motorsport	1892
4		(United States) #11 PR1/Mathiasen Motorsports	1882
5		(United States) #81 DragonSpeed USA	1878

LMP3 Teams' Championship standings
Pos.	+/–	Team	Points
1		(United States) #54 CORE Autosport	2002
2		(United States) #74 Riley Motorsports	1948
3		(United States) #30 Jr III Motorsports	1942
4		(United States) #33 Sean Creech Motorsport	1790
5	1	(United States) #36 Andretti Autosport	1764

GTD Pro Teams' Championship standings
Pos.	+/–	Team	Points
1		(Canada) #9 Pfaff Motorsports	3497
2	1	(United States) #14 Vasser Sullivan Racing	3277
3	1	(United States) #3 Corvette Racing	3194
4		(United States) #23 Heart of Racing Team	3103
5		(United States) #25 BMW M Team RLL	2872

GTD Teams' Championship standings
Pos.	+/–	Team	Points
1		(United States) #27 Heart of Racing Team	2898
2	1	(United States) #16 Wright Motorsports	2875
3	1	(United States) #32 Team Korthoff Motorsports	2860
4	1	(United States) #96 Turner Motorsport	2785
5	1	(United States) #57 Winward Racing	2714

- Note: Only the top five positions are included for all sets of standings.

DPi Manufacturers' Championship standings
Pos.	+/–	Manufacturer	Points
1		(Japan) Acura	3718
2		(United States) Cadillac	3652

GTD Pro Manufacturers' Championship standings
Pos.	+/–	Manufacturer	Points
1		(Germany) Porsche	3497
2		(Japan) Lexus	3307
3		(United States) Chevrolet	3204
4		(United Kingdom) Aston Martin	3173
5		(Germany) BMW	2957

GTD Manufacturers' Championship standings
Pos.	+/–	Manufacturer	Points
1		(Germany) BMW	3307
2		(Germany) Mercedes-AMG	3235
3		(United Kingdom) Aston Martin	3193
4	1	(Germany) Porsche	3004
5	1	(Italy) Lamborghini	2971

- Note: Only the top five positions are included for all sets of standings.
- Note: Bold names include the Drivers', Teams', and Manufactures' Champion respectively.

IMSA SportsCar Championship
Previous race: 2022 GT Challenge at VIR	2022 season	Next race: None
