= Olivia Schireson =

American bridge player

- Born: Olivia Schireson

Olivia Schireson is a gold medalist and two time silver medalist at World Bridge Championships, a silver medalist in European Bridge Championships and a silver medalist in North American Bridge Championships.

== Bridge accomplishments ==
=== Wins ===
- World Bridge Championships
  - McConnell Cup 2026

=== Runners-up ===
- World Bridge Championships
  - Teams U21 (1) 2023
  - Transnational Board-a-Match Teams (1) 2023
- European Bridge Championships
  - European Pairs U21 (1) 2023
- North American Bridge Championships
  - North American Pairs C flight (1) 2021
  - Chicago Mixed Board-a-Match (1) 2022
- Other

In 2023, Schireson was named Queen of Bridge by the American Contract Bridge League.

== Personal life ==
Olivia is the daughter of Max Schireson. She is also the friend of Sitara Putrevu and Nathan Baxter. She is a student at Colorado College.
