= Kevin P. Ryan =

American investor and entrepreneur

- Education: Yale University, INSEAD
- Occupations: Founder, CEO
- Known for: CEO at DoubleClick, founder of MongoDB, founder of Business Insider, founder of Gilt Groupe, founder of Zola, founder of AlleyCorp, vice chairman of Partnership for New York City, board director of Mercy Corps, director emeritus of Human Rights Watch

Kevin P. Ryan is an American executive and investor. Ryan was an executive at DoubleClick from 1996 to 2005. Ryan co-founded AlleyCorp, a venture capital firm, in 2008, through which he has founded several New York–based businesses, including Gilt Groupe, Business Insider and MongoDB.

== Career ==
Ryan began his career working at United Media, where he launched the Dilbert website, based on the comic strip. Ryan worked for Euro Disney in France, and as an investment banker with Prudential in the US and the UK.

Starting in 1996, Ryan worked at DoubleClick as president and COO. In 2000, he became CEO. By 2005, DoubleClick had expanded from a 20-person startup to a publicly traded company with over 1,500 employees. DoubleClick was sold in 2005 for $1.1 billion to Hellman and Friedman LLC, and Ryan stepped down as CEO.

=== Investments ===
In 2004, Ryan became an angel investor in TheLadders.com. He also was an early investor and board member of HotJobs, which was purchased by Yahoo! for $436 million in 2002.

After leaving DoubleClick, Ryan, along with former DoubleClick CTO and co-founder, Dwight Merriman, founded a network of three affiliated Internet companies of which he is chairman and CEO. AlleyCorp has expanded its mission to both found and invest in companies in New York City.

==== Gilt Groupe ====
Founded by Ryan and Dwight Merriman in 2007, Gilt Groupe is an online shopping site which sells clothing, home decor, food, and travel services. Gilt Groupe secured over $240 million in total financing. Its investors include Matrix Partners, General Atlantic Partners, Softbank Group, New Enterprise Associates, Draper Fisher Jurvetson and Goldman Sachs. In February 2014, Gilt Groupe was preparing for an IPO. However, the company sold to the Hudson's Bay Company in January 2016 for $250 million.

==== Business Insider ====
Ryan and Dwight Merriman founded Business Insider in 2009 with Henry Blodget. Ryan was chairman of the board through its acquisition by Axel Springer SE for $442 million.

==== MongoDB ====
Ryan and Dwight Merriman founded MongoDB Inc. in 2007. Ryan served as chairman of the board through the company's initial public offering in 2017 at a $1.18 billion valuation.

== Recognitions ==
In June 2009, Ryan was named Entrepreneur of the Year by Ernst & Young, LLP and In 2013 was named one of "The 100 Most Influential New Yorkers of the Past 25 Years" by the Observer. Ryan was also named one of the "50 Most Influential Business People" by Crain's New York Business, and was included in Vanity Fair's "2011 New Establishment List".

== Personal ==
Ryan earned his B.A. from Yale University in 1985 and his M.B.A. from INSEAD in 1990. He is a Fellow at Yale University's Trumbull College. Ryan lives in New York City with his wife and children. His wife is a French citizen. His oldest son studied in Yale College for his undergraduate studies and an MBA in Stanford. After graduating from Yale he worked in France in a startup called Brut. It is a major player in Europe in the media and entertainment realm. He was the 10th employee.

== See also ==
- Panther Express
