= Dwight Merriman =

American businessman (born 1968)

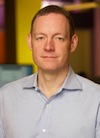
- Born: August 5, 1968 (age 58); New York, New York, U.S.
- Education: Miami University
- Occupations: Entrepreneur; Racing driver
- Categorisation: FIA Bronze
- Known for: Co-founder of DoubleClick and MongoDB Inc.
- Website: www.mongodb.com

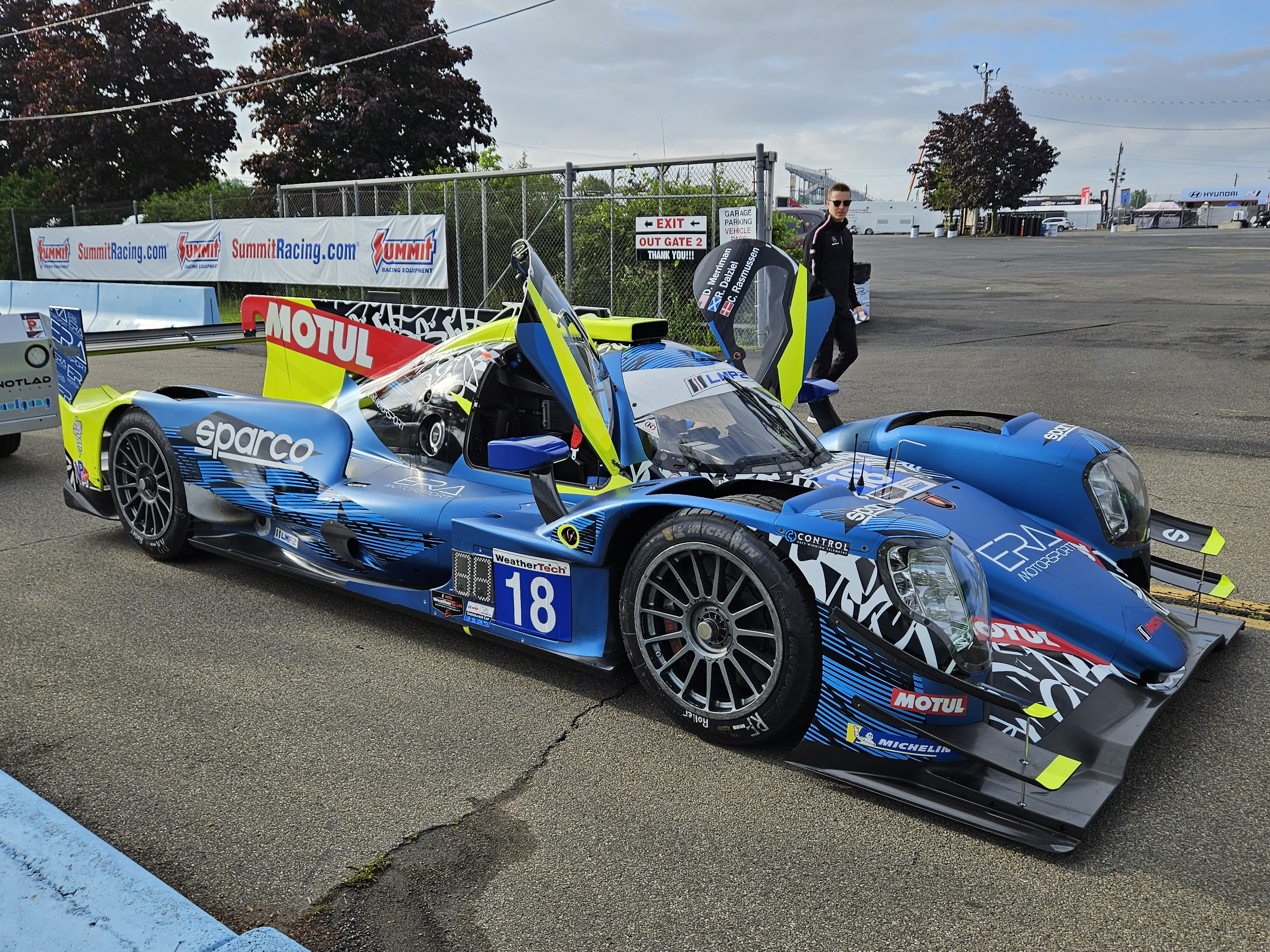
An Oreca 07 LMP2 driven by Dwight Merriman

Dwight Merriman (born August 5, 1968) is an American Internet executive, racing driver, and entrepreneur in New York City's Silicon Alley. Best known for co-founding DoubleClick with Kevin O'Connor and serving as its CTO for 10 years, Merriman currently serves on the Board of Directors of MongoDB Inc., where he was previously cofounder and chairman.

== Business career ==
DoubleClick was sold in 2005 for $1.1 billion to Hellman and Friedman LLC, and Merriman stepped down as CTO shortly thereafter. DoubleClick was acquired by Google for $3.1 billion in March 2008.

After leaving DoubleClick, Merriman, along with former DoubleClick CEO Kevin Ryan, founded AlleyCorp, a network of affiliated Internet companies, including MongoDB Inc., ShopWiki, Business Insider, and Gilt Groupe.

== Racing career ==
Merriman began his racing career in 2018, driving a Volkswagen Golf for Heinlein Racing Development in the Pirelli World Challenge. He ended ninth overall at the end of the season. Two years later, in 2020, Merriman made his debut in the 24 Hours of Daytona for Era Motorsport alongside drivers Kyle Tilley, Ryan Lewis, and Nicolas Minassian. They finished fourth in their class, 11th overall.

In 2021, Merriman returned with Era Motorsport to the 24 Hours of Daytona alongside Tilley, Ryan Dalziel, and Paul-Loup Chatin. The group recorded 787 laps, winning their class.

== Racing record ==
=== Career summary ===
Season	Series	Team	Races	Wins	Poles	F/Laps	Podiums	Points	Position
2018	Pirelli World Challenge - TCR	Heinlein Racing Development	12	0	0	0	0	130	9th
2020	IMSA SportsCar Championship - LMP2	Era Motorsport	4	0	0	0	3	92	5th
2021	Asian Le Mans Series - LMP2 Am	Era Motorsport	4	4	1	0	4	104	**1st**
2021	IMSA SportsCar Championship - LMP2	Era Motorsport	7	2	0	0	3	1620	4th
2021	European Le Mans Series - LMP2	IDEC Sport	4	0	0	0	0	2	31st
2022	IMSA SportsCar Championship - LMP2	Era Motorsport	7	1	0	1	3	1892	**2nd**
2023	IMSA SportsCar Championship - LMP2	Era Motorsport	7	0	0	0	2	1740	5th
2024	IMSA SportsCar Championship - LMP2	Era Motorsport	5	2	0	0	4	1597	14th
2025	Middle East Trophy - GT3	Era Motorsport							
2025	24H Series - GT3	Era Motorsport							
2026	24H Series - GT3	Era Motorsport							

* Season still in progress.

=== Complete WeatherTech SportsCar Championship results ===
(key)(Races in bold indicate pole position. Races in italics indicate fastest race lap in class. Results are overall/class)

Year	Team	Class	Make	Engine	1	2	3	4	5	6	7	Rank	Points
2020	Era Motorsport	LMP2	Oreca 07	Gibson GK428 4.2 L V8	DAY; 3	SEB; 4	ELK; 4	ATL; 6	ATL	LGA	SEB	5th	92
2021	Era Motorsport	LMP2	Oreca 07	Gibson GK428 4.2 L V8	DAY; 1	SEB; 2	WGI; 5	WGL	ELK; 1	LGA; 4	ATL; 5	4th	1620
2022	Era Motorsport	LMP2	Oreca 07	Gibson GK428 4.2 L V8	DAY; 10	SEB; 3	LGA; 2	MDO; 5	WGL; 7	ELK; 1	PET; 5	2nd	1892
2023	Era Motorsport	LMP2	Oreca 07	Gibson GK428 4.2 L V8	DAY; 9	SEB; 3	LGA; 7	WGL; 2	ELK; 6	IMS; 6	PET; 5	5th	1740
2024	Era Motorsport	LMP2	Oreca 07	Gibson GK428 4.2 L V8	DAY; 1	SEB; 1	WGL; 12	MOS	ELK	IMS; 3	ATL; 3	14th	1597

* Season still in progress

=== Complete Asian Le Mans Series results ===
(key) (Races in bold indicate pole position)

Year	Team	Co-Drivers	Car	Engine	Class	No.	1	2	3	4	Pos.	Points
**2021**	**(United States) Era Motorsport**	(Greece) Andreas Laskaratos (United Kingdom) Kyle Tilley	Oreca 07	Gibson GK428 4.2 L V8	**P2 Am**	18	**DUB**; **1**; 1	**DUB**; **2**; 1	**ABU**; **1**; 1	**ABU**; **2**; 1	1st	104

=== 24 Hours of Daytona results ===
Year	Team	Co-drivers	Car	Class	Laps	Pos.	Class Pos.
2020	(United States) Era Motorsport	(United Kingdom) Ryan Lewis (France) Nicolas Minassian (United Kingdom) Kyle Tilley	Oreca 07	LMP2	800	11th	**3rd**
2021	(United States) Era Motorsport	(France) Paul-Loup Chatin (United Kingdom) Ryan Dalziel (United Kingdom) Kyle Tilley	Oreca 07	LMP2	787	6th	**1st**
