= Gilt Groupe =

Online shopping website based in the United States

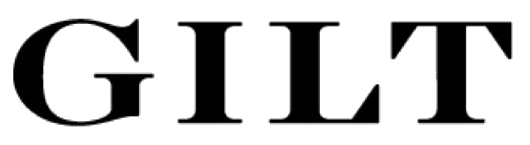
- Type: Subsidiary
- Industry: E-commerce
- Founded: 2007
- Founders: Kevin P. Ryan, Michael Bryzek, Phong Nguyen, Alexis Maybank, Alexandra Wilkis Wilson
- Headquarters: New York City, U.S.
- Key people: Jonathan Greller (President)
- Owner: Rue La La
- Number of employees: More than 1000
- Website: gilt.com

Gilt Groupe is an American online shopping site launched in 2007. In 2016, the company was sold to Hudson's Bay Company for approximately $250 million, which was less than the $268 million taken from investors. Prior to the Hudson's Bay acquisition, sales were exceeding growth projections but the firm had not been profitable yet. In 2018, Boston-based Rue La La acquired Gilt from Hudson's Bay.

== History ==
Gilt Groupe is based in New York City with warehouses in Brooklyn, New York City; Las Vegas, Nevada; and Shepherdsville, Kentucky.

The company was co-founded by Kevin P. Ryan, Michael Bryzek and Phong Nguyen, with Alexis Maybank, and Alexandra Wilson joining shortly after the company's inception; who modeled Gilt after Vente-Privee, an online fashion retailer in France. The original business plan consisted of "flash sales," selling a limited number of luxury designer items at steep discounts for brief periods.

The company launched women's clothing and accessories in November 2007 and menswear in April 2008. It expanded to include Gilt Groupe Japan, Gilt Fuse, and travel site Jetsetter in 2009. It later added Gilt City and Gilt Home in 2010 and Gilt Taste in 2011.

In 2009, growth equity firm General Atlantic led a series C funding round, joined by previous investor Matrix Partners. By February 2014, Gilt Groupe was preparing for an IPO.

In 2010, Gilt acquired luxury deal-of-the-day site Bergine. This was the first of several acquisitions.

According to Business Insider, during its "hyper-growth years, the company overextended itself and lost focus", as the expanded business segments such as "Full-price retail, travel, and food were sucking resources from Gilt's core categories — discounted women's fashion", and Gilt was forced to sell these non-core businesses at a loss. Flash sales companies were also seeing slower growth, thanks in part to e-mail fatigue (the key means for flash sales to be promoted) with e-mail providers increasingly classifying these messages as spam). The IPO kept getting delayed and ending up never happening, while the firm never reached profitability. By 2015, Gilt was raising money "at a lower valuation than the $1 billion at which it reportedly raised $138 million in 2011". Such a cash infusion is known as "down round" which hurts employee morale and devalues the founders' stakes.

On January 7, 2016, Gilt Groupe announced its acquisition by Hudson's Bay Company, owner of luxury department store chains Hudson's Bay, Lord & Taylor and Saks Fifth Avenue, for $250 million.

In June 2018 it was announced the HBC would be selling Gilt to Rue La La.

On October 2, 2019, Gilt Groupe and Simon Property Group announced a joint venture for ShopPremiumOutlets.com, an online shopping platform focused on its outlet malls, to create a new e-commerce platform dedicated to value shopping.

== Business ==
Gilt Groupe visitors must be members in order to view sales. Sales last 36–48 hours and feature merchandise from a single brand or small groups of brands. The firm purchases vendor inventory at an extreme discount, adding a margin in order to make a profit. On August 22, 2011, Gilt Groupe added a Facebook shopping section.

== Book ==
Penguin Group printed a history of Gilt Groupe in 2012 written by two of its founders, Alexis Maybank and Alexandra Wilkis Wilson. By Invitation Only: How We Built Gilt and Changed the Way Millions Shop was published before Gilt was bought out by Hudson's Bay; At that time the firm was valued at more than $1 billion, over four times greater than its eventual selling price.
