= Thomas Merrill (racing driver) =

American racing driver (born 1986)

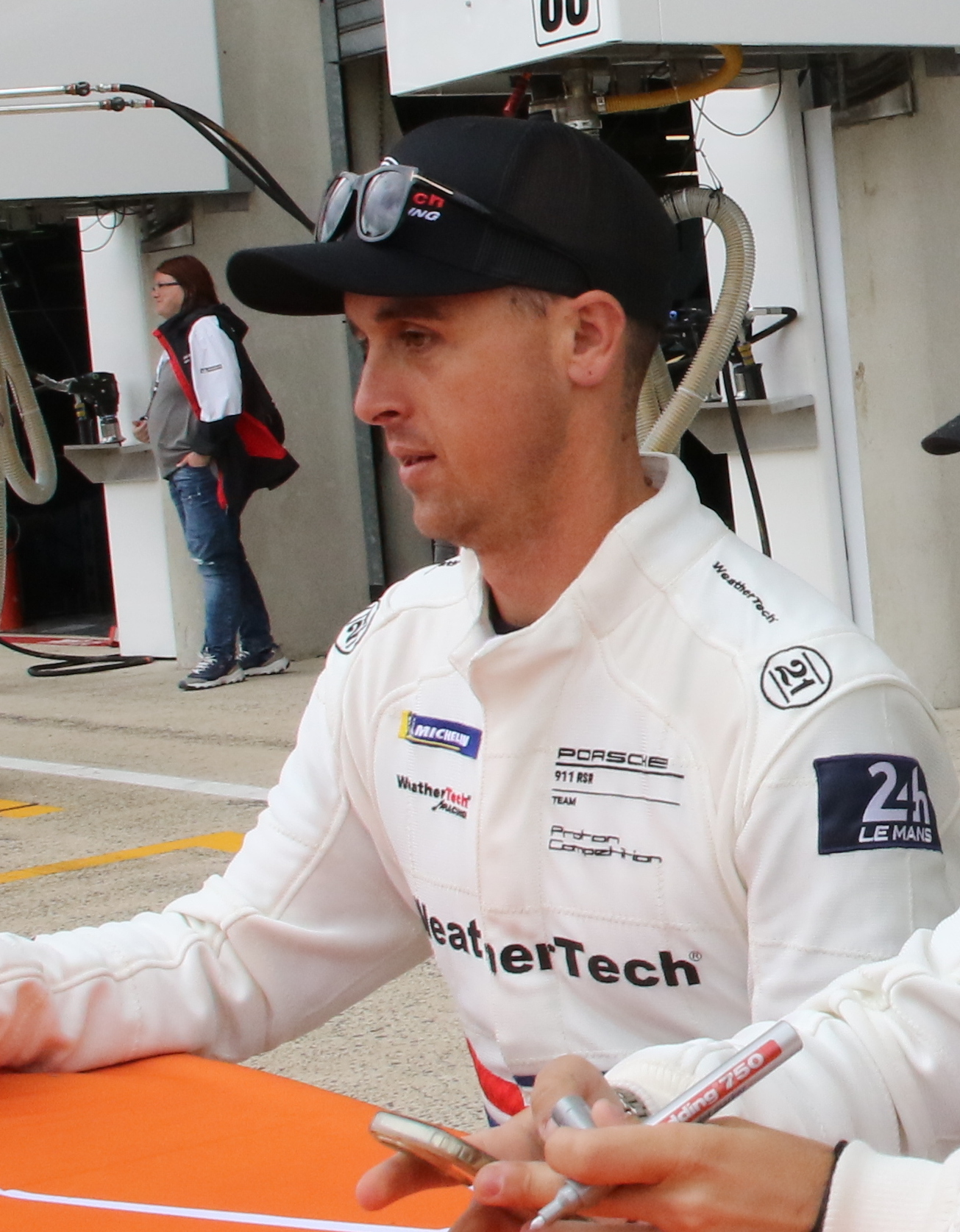
- Merrill during the 2022 24 Hours of Le Mans
- Nationality: (United States) American
- Born: April 17, 1987 (age 39) Salinas, California, United States

Trans-Am Series career
- Debut season: 2017
- Current team: Mike Cope Racing
- Categorisation: FIA Bronze (until 2022); FIA Silver (2023–)
- Car number: 26

Championship titles
- 2023 2022 2018 2006: Asian Le Mans Series – GT; Trans-Am Series – TA2; Trans-Am Series West Coast Championship – TA2; SCCA San Francisco Region Formula Continental
- Statistics up to date as of March 8, 2025.

Thomas Merrill (born April 17, 1986) is an American racing driver who competes in the Trans-Am Series.

Alongside Nicky Catsburg and Chandler Hull, he was the 2023 Asian Le Mans Series champion in the GT class. He also won the TA2-class title in the 2022 Trans-Am Series.

== Career ==
=== Early career ===
Merrill was exposed to racing at a young age, as both of his parents were racing drivers themselves, taking part in Porsche Club meetings around his hometown of Salinas, California. Merrill himself began racing at the age of eight, culminating in his first karting title in 1998 at the age of 11. Following on his from initial title victory, he would win six consecutive championships over the following years, including back-to-back national titles in 2005 and 2006.

In 2006, Merrill transitioned into formula racing, taking part in the SCCA San Francisco Region Formula Continental series, where he won thirteen of fourteen races en route to the championship. The following year saw him step up to Pacific F2000, where he finished second in the championship behind Patrick Barrett.

=== Sports car racing ===
In 2008, Merrill graduated to the Rolex Sports Car Series, embarking on a part-time program in the GT class for PR1 Motorsports. Appearing at Homestead, Laguna Seca, and Watkins Glen, Merrill claimed a best finish of 12th. He returned to the team in 2009, making his debut at the 24 Hours of Daytona alongside another appearance at Laguna Seca. 2010 and 2011 saw Merrill run just one race each in the Rolex Sports Car Series and IMSA SportsCar Challenge, after which he appeared to scale back his professional racing duties.

=== Trans-Am Series and recent years ===
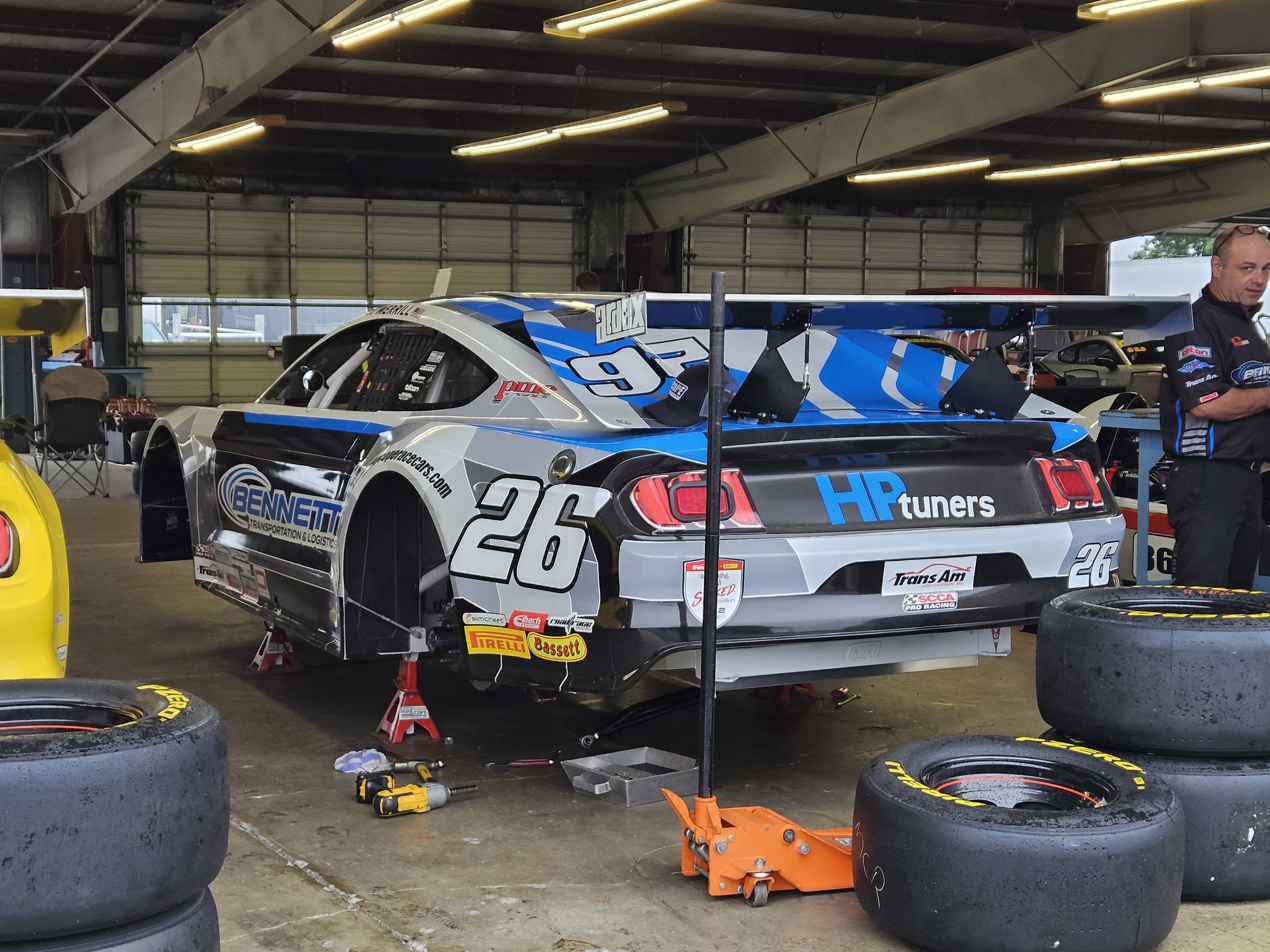
Merrill's TA2 Ford Mustang at Watkins Glen International in 2023.

Near the end of the 2017 season, Merrill began competing in the Trans-Am Series, driving for Big Diehl Racing. After making his debut at Circuit of the Americas, the team confirmed a full-season entry into the West Coast Championship for 2018. In just his second official race in the championship at Auto Club Speedway, he scored his first TA2-class victory. Through the five-race season, of which Merrill competed in only four races, he won all four races in which he competed. With 140 points scored, he won the TA2 West Coast Championship. He stepped up to the nationwide championship for 2019, albeit not for the full season. Through the eight races he competed in, Merrill claimed back-to-back victories at Laguna Seca and Lime Rock, as well as an additional victory in the season finale at Daytona. A potential fourth victory was stripped at VIR due to a reckless driving penalty. When the dust settled, he finished 8th in points, with nearly half the points total of series champion Marc Miller.

In early 2020, Merrill embarked on a one-off effort in the IMSA Prototype Challenge, driving for K2R Motorsports alongside Steven Thomas. The duo scored a Bronze Cup-class victory at Daytona, before teaming up again for the season finale at Road Atlanta, where they would claim an overall podium. Merrill also returned to Trans-Am in 2020, driving for Mike Cope Racing. He claimed just one TA2 victory in 2020, scoring overall honors at Mid-Ohio in June. He would finish fourth in the championship, with 173 points.

Merrill participated in several programs in 2021, splitting his efforts between Trans-Am and sports car racing under the IMSA and SRO umbrellas. His Trans-Am program formed the majority of his efforts, as he claimed six podiums and one race victory during the season, finishing fourth in the TA2 championship once again. Merrill also competed in the Michelin Endurance Cup sub-championship of the 2021 IMSA SportsCar Championship, driving in the LMP2 class for WIN Autosport alongside Tristan Nunez and former teammate Thomas. The trio claimed a class victory at the 6 Hours of Watkins Glen, and also claimed a podium at Petit Le Mans. In addition to a temporary GT4 America Series program with Stephen Cameron Racing, Merrill took part in the Indianapolis 8 Hour for DXDT Racing, driving alongside Erin Vogel and Michael Cooper.

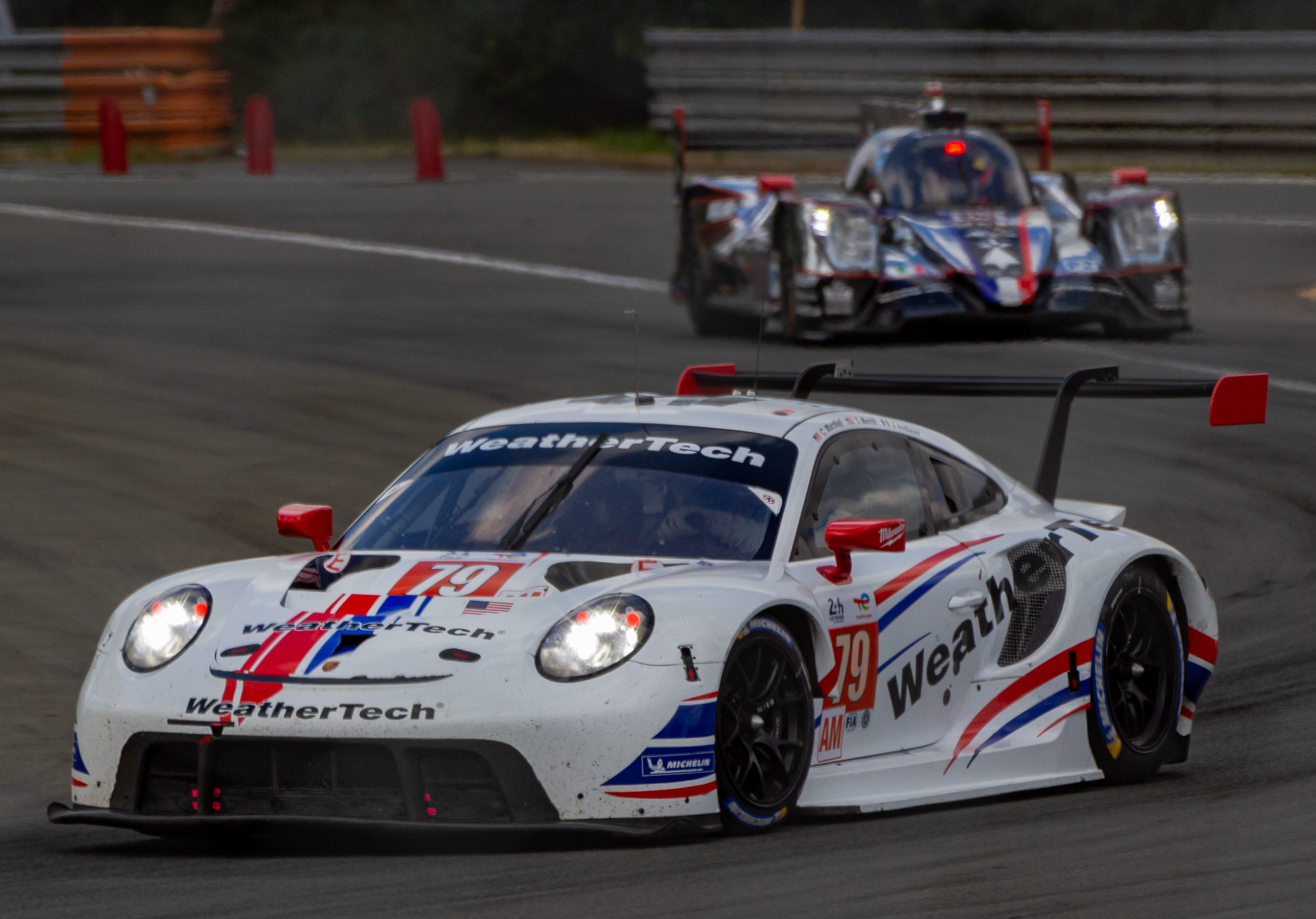
Merrill's Porsche 911 RSR-19 at Le Mans in 2022.

2022 saw Merrill score his first Trans-Am TA2 championship. After winning his first race of the campaign at Lime Rock, he followed it up with another victory in the subsequent round at Mid-Ohio. Merrill scored the championship on a tie-breaker, ending level on points with Rafa Matos. Matos began the weekend with a strong points lead, however a 40th-place finish for the Brazilian and a race victory for Merrill saw the latter take the championship. During the 2022 season, Merrill felt he was "at home" in the series, and he was pleased with the development the series had experienced since he began racing in 2017. Merrill also made his debut at the 24 Hours of Le Mans in 2022, racing in the GTE Am class for WeatherTech Racing alongside Cooper MacNeil and Julien Andlauer. The trio would finish second in the GTE Am class, marking Merrill's first Le Mans podium in his maiden appearance. Merrill made a number of additional one-off appearance during 2022, including a podium finish for Jr III Racing in the IMSA Prototype Challenge at Mid-Ohio.

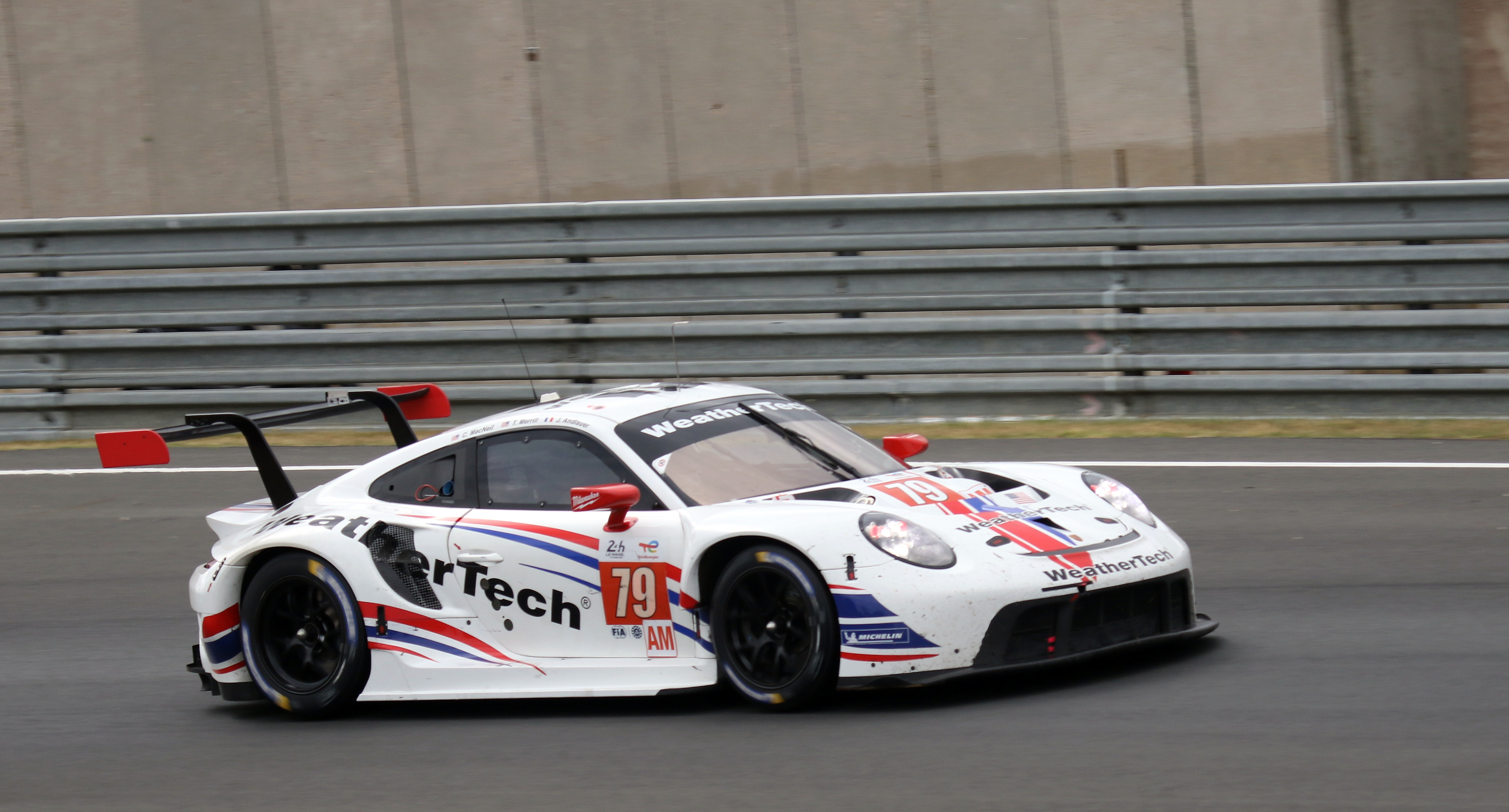
Merrill's WeatherTech Porsche at the 2022 Le Mans 24 Hours.

Merrill began his 2023 campaign by returning to the 24 Hours of Daytona, driving for AWA in the LMP3 class. Alongside Wayne Boyd, Anthony Mantella, and Nicolás Varrone, Merrill claimed victory in the LMP3 class – his first class victory at the Rolex 24. Merrill was also embroiled in a battle for the final spot in Northwest AMR's FIA World Endurance Championship entry with Axcil Jefferies, although Jefferies would go on to secure the seat. In February, Merrill traveled to the Middle East to compete in the 2023 Asian Le Mans Series with Walkenhorst Motorsport. Teamed up with Nicky Catsburg and Chandler Hull, Merrill claimed two victories, three podiums, and the GT-class championship.

Merrill's full-time programs for 2023 surrounded both the Trans-Am Series and Porsche Carrera Cup North America. In Trans-Am, Merrill claimed his first victory of the season at Lime Rock in May. He claimed his first Porsche Cup podium in July at Road America. In Trans-Am, Merrill entered the final round at COTA in the hunt for the championship, but ultimately fell short to Brent Crews. In Porsche Cup competition, Merrill would finish tenth in the overall championship.

In 2024, Merrill returned to AWA, expanding his presence beyond the 24 Hours of Daytona to the entire Michelin Endurance Cup with the team. However, Merrill's seat would cease to exist beyond the 2024 12 Hours of Sebring, with Anthony Mantella withdrawing the entry following the second round of the season. Following on from his second-place championship finish in 2023, Merrill once again was runner-up in TA2 in 2024. His #26 scored two race victories, at Road Atlanta and Watkins Glen, but Merrill ultimately finished 80 points behind series champion Rafa Matos.

Alongside a continuation of his Trans-Am duties, Merrill began competing full-time in the GT4 America Series in 2025, joining Adrian Comstock in a Pro-Am entry for Archangel Motorsports.

== Racing record ==
=== Career summary ===
Season	Series	Team	Races	Wins	Poles	F/Laps	Podiums	Points	Position
2006	SCCA San Francisco Region Formula Continental	Porter Racing	14	13	14	?	14	364	**1st**
2007	Pacific F2000	PR1 Motorsports	12	2	3	3	7	244	**2nd**
2008	Rolex Sports Car Series - GT	PR1 Motorsports	3	0	0	0	0	44	68th
2009	Rolex Sports Car Series - GT	PR1 Motorsports	2	0	0	0	0	42	51st
2010	Rolex Sports Car Series - GT	Corsa Team PR1	1	0	0	0	0	20	72nd
2011	Continental Tire Sports Car Challenge - GS	AM Performance	1	0	0	0	0	?	?
2014	Pacific F2000 - F1600		2	1	?	?	2	55	5th
2017	Trans-Am Series West Coast Championship - TA2	Big Diehl Racing	1	0	0	?	1	27	7th
2018	Trans-Am Series West Coast Championship - TA2	Big Diehl Racing	4	4	4	?	4	140	**1st**
2019	Trans-Am Series - TA2	Big Diehl Racing; Mike Cope Racing	8	3	1	?	4	175	8th
2020	Trans-Am Series - TA2	Mike Cope Racing	8	1	0	?	2	173	4th
2020	Trans-Am Series West Coast Championship - TA2	Mike Cope Racing	2	2	2	?	2	70	8th
2020	IMSA Prototype Challenge	K2R Motorsports	2	0	0	?	1	55	22nd
2021	Trans-Am Series - TA2	Mike Cope Racing	11	1	1	?	6	238	4th
2021	IMSA SportsCar Championship - LMP2	WIN Autosport	4	1	2	0	2	1032	6th
2021	GT4 America Series - Am	Stephen Cameron Racing	4	0	1	2	2	55	12th
2022	Trans-Am Series - TA2	Mike Cope Racing	12	3	3	?	8	259	**1st**
2022	Trans-Am Series - TA	allgram	1	0	0	?	0	23	17th
2022	GT4 America Series - Am	Nolasport	2	0	0	1	1	18	19th
2022	24 Hours of Le Mans - GTE Am	WeatherTech Racing	1	0	0	1	1	N/A	**2nd**
2022	IMSA Prototype Challenge	Jr III Racing	1	0	0	0	1	300	27th
2022	Michelin Pilot Challenge - GS	NTE / MC2 Autosport	1	0	0	0	0	10	73rd
2023	Trans-Am Series - TA2	Mike Cope Racing	13	1	2	?	5	1007	**2nd**
2023	Porsche Carrera Cup North America	Nolasport	14	0	0	0	1	92	10th
2023	Asian Le Mans Series - GT	Walkenhorst Motorsport	4	2	2	0	3	82	**1st**
2023	IMSA SportsCar Championship - LMP3	AWA	1	1	0	0	1	0	NC
2023	IMSA SportsCar Championship - GTD	Turner Motorsport	1	0	0	0	0	268	52nd
2024	Trans-Am Series - TA2	Mike Cope Racing	12	2	1	?	7	1058	**2nd**
2024	IMSA SportsCar Championship - GTD	AWA	2	0	0	0	0	251	56th
2024	992 Endurance Cup	Team Laptime-Performance	1	0	0	0	0	N/A	17th
2025	Trans-Am Series - TA2	Mike Cope Racing	1	0	0	?	0	45*	16th*
2025	GT4 America Series - Pro-Am	Archangel Motorsports						*	*
2025	Michelin Pilot Challenge - GS	AR Motorsports							
2026	Michelin Pilot Challenge - GS	Circle H Racing							
2026	GT World Challenge America - Pro-Am	Wright Motorsports	5	0	0	0	1	0	NC†
2026	GT World Challenge America - Pro	Wright Motorsports	1	0	0	0	0	0	NC†
2026	Trans-Am Series - TA2								
2026	GT4 America Series - Pro-Am	Random Vandals Racing							

^{*} Season still in progress.

=== Complete Grand-Am Rolex Sports Car Series results ===
(key) (Races in bold indicate pole position)

Year	Team	Class	Make	Engine	1	2	3	4	5	6	7	8	9	10	11	12	13	Rank	Points
2008	PR1 Motorsports	GT	Pontiac GXP.R	Pontiac 6.0 L V8	DAY	MIA; 16	MEX	VIR	LGA; 21	LIM	WGL; 12	MOH	DAY	BAR	MON	JER	MIL	68th	44
2009	PR1 Motorsports	GT	Pontiac GXP.R	Pontiac 6.0 L V8	DAY; 11	VIR	JER	LGA; 9	WGL	MOH	DAY	BAR	WGL	MON	MIL	MIA		51st	42
2010	Corsa Team PR1	GT	BMW M6	BMW 5.0 L V10	DAY; 11	MIA	BAR	VIR	LIM	WGL	MOH	DAY	JER	WGL	MON	MIL		72nd	20

=== Complete IMSA SportsCar Championship results ===
(key) (Races in bold indicate pole position)

Year	Team	Class	Chassis	Engine	1	2	3	4	5	6	7	8	9	10	11	Rank	Points
2021	WIN Autosport	LMP2	Oreca 07	Gibson GK428 4.2 L V8	DAY; 5†	**SEB**; 4	**WGL**; 1	WGL	ELK	LGA	PET; 3					6th	1032
2023	AWA	LMP3	Duqueine D-08	Nissan VK56DE 5.6L V8	DAY; 1†											NC†	0†
2023	Turner Motorsport	GTD	BMW M4 GT3	BMW S58B30T0 3.0 L Twin Turbo I6		SEB	LBH	MON	WGL	MOS	LIM	ELK	VIR	IMS	PET; 7	52nd	268
2024	AWA	GTD	Chevrolet Corvette Z06 GT3.R	Chevrolet LT6 5.5 L V8	DAY; 18	SEB; 22	LBH	LGA	WGL	MOS	ELK	VIR	IMS	PET		56th	251

^{†} Points only counted towards the Michelin Endurance Cup, and not the overall LMP2 Championship.

^{†} Points only counted towards the Michelin Endurance Cup, and not the overall LMP3 Championship.

=== Complete 24 Hours of Le Mans results ===
Year	Team	Co-Drivers	Car	Class	Laps	Pos.	Class Pos.
2022	(United States) WeatherTech Racing	(France) Julien Andlauer (United States) Cooper MacNeil	Porsche 911 RSR-19	GTE; Am	343	35th	**2nd**

=== Complete Porsche Carrera Cup North America results ===
(key) (Races in bold indicate pole position) (Races in italics indicate fastest lap)

Year	Team	1	2	3	4	5	6	7	8	9	10	11	12	13	14	15	16	Pos	Points
2023	Nolasport	SEB; 1; 10	SEB; 2; 9	LBH; 1; 7	LBH; 2; 10	MIA; 1; 28	MIA; 2; 15	WGL; 1	WGL; 2	ELK; 1; 10	ELK; 2; 2	IMS; 1; 5	IMS; 2; 7	LGA; 1; 8	LGA; 2; 18	AUS; 1; 8	AUS; 2; 27	10th	92

^{*} Season still in progress.

Sporting positions
Preceded by Shane Lewis	Trans-Am Series West Coast Championship; TA2 Champion; 2018	Succeeded by Brad McAllister
Preceded by Rafa Matos	Trans-Am Series; TA2 Champion; 2022	Succeeded by Brent Crews
Preceded by Ben Barnicoat; Brendan Iribe; Ollie Millroy	Asian Le Mans Series; GT Champion; 2023; With: Nicky Catsburg & Chandler Hull	Succeeded by Alex Malykhin; Joel Sturm; Klaus Bachler
