= 2024 12 Hours of Sebring =

72nd 12 Hours of Sebring race

Sebring International Raceway

The 2024 12 Hours of Sebring (formally known as the 72nd Mobil 1 Twelve Hours of Sebring Presented by Cadillac) was an endurance sports car race held at Sebring International Raceway near Sebring, Florida, scheduled from March 13 to 16, 2024. It was the second round of both the 2024 IMSA SportsCar Championship and the Michelin Endurance Cup.

== Background ==
=== Preview ===
International Motor Sports Association (IMSA) president John Doonan confirmed the race was a part of the 2024 IMSA SportsCar Championship (IMSA SCC) in August 2023. It was the eleventh consecutive year it will be a part of the IMSA SCC, and the 72nd 12 Hours of Sebring. The 12 Hours of Sebring was the second of eleven scheduled sports car endurance races by IMSA, and the second of five races on the Michelin Endurance Cup (MEC). The race took place at the 17-turn 3.741 mi (6.021 km) Sebring International Raceway in Sebring, Florida on March 16, 2024.

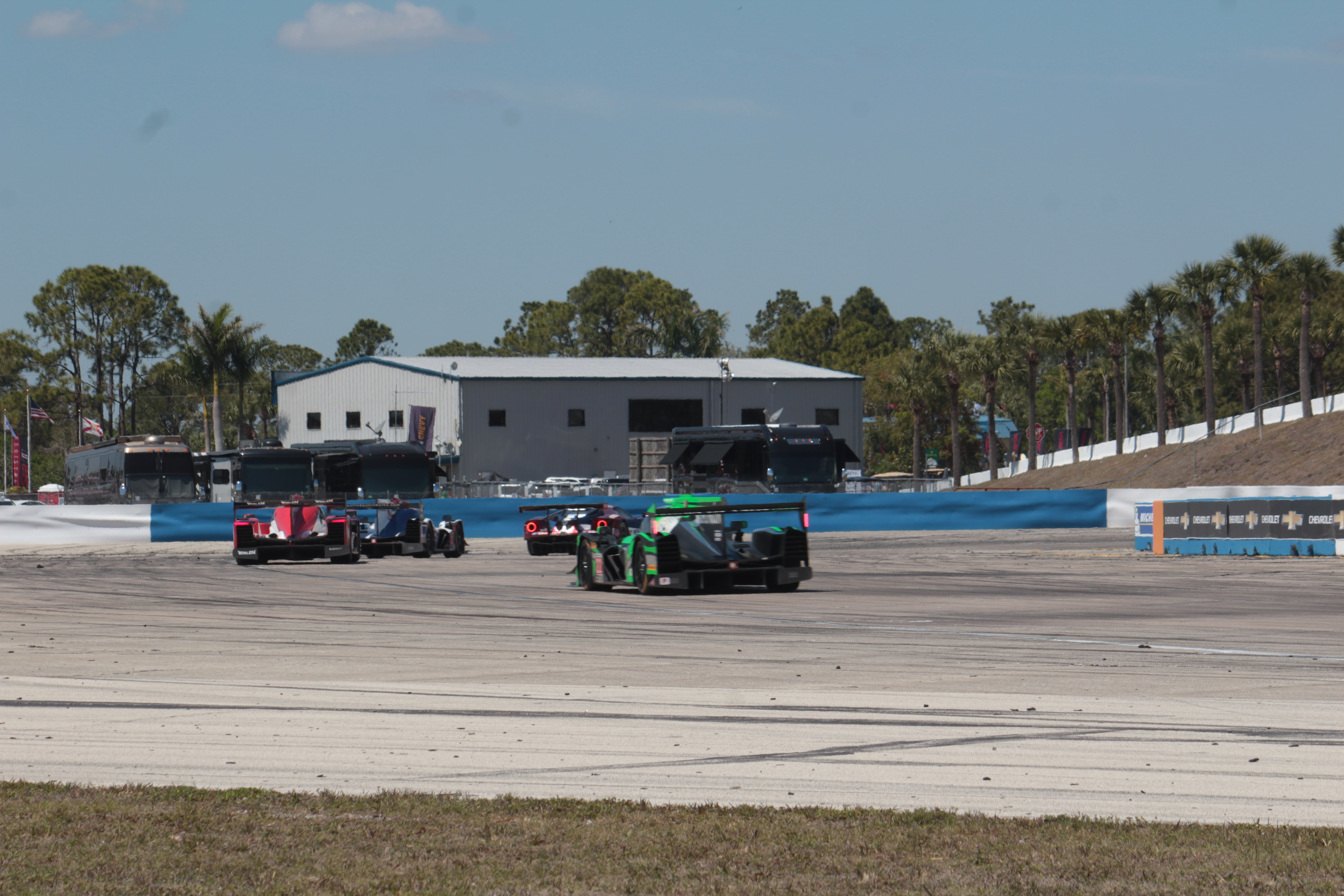
Sebring International Raceway, where the race was held.

The 2024 edition marked the first time since 2021 in which the IMSA SportsCar Championship and FIA World Endurance Championship would not compete during the same weekend; for the past two years, the 1000 Miles of Sebring joined the 12 hour event.

=== Balance of performance ===
On March 7, 2024, IMSA released the latest technical bulletin outlining balance of performance for the GTP, GTD Pro, and GTD classes. In GTP, the Acura received a 17 kilogram weight break, with the BMW and Porsche losing 1 kilogram and 2 kilograms, respectively. Acura, BMW, and Porsche also received a reduction in power. The Cadillac received 30 kilograms of additional weight after their dominant Rolex 24 showing, whilst getting a 10 kilowatt power increase. The Lamborghini, which made its IMSA debut, had its weight set at 1044 kilograms. In GTD Pro and GTD, the BMW, Corvette, Ferrari, Lamborghini, Mercedes, and Porsche received weight increases, whilst the Ford and Lexus received weight breaks. Furthermore, all GT cars had changes made to their total fuel tank capacity.

=== Standings before the race ===
Before the race, Dane Cameron, Matt Campbell, Felipe Nasr, and Josef Newgarden led the GTP Drivers' Championship with 380 points. In LMP2, Ryan Dalziel, Dwight Merriman, Christian Rasmussen, and Connor Zilisch were leading the Drivers' Championship with 370 points. The GTD Pro Drivers' Championship was led by James Calado, Alessandro Pier Guidi, Davide Rigon, and Daniel Serra with 376 points; 21 points ahead of Michael Christensen, Laurin Heinrich, and Sebastian Priaulx in second position. With 364 points, Philip Ellis, Indy Dontje, Daniel Morad, and Russell Ward were leading the GTD Drivers' Championship. Porsche were leading the Manufacturers' Championship the GTP and GTD Pro classes, and Mercedes-AMG led the GTD Manufacturers' Championship. Porsche Penske Motorsport, Era Motorsport, Risi Competizione, and Winward Racing each lead their own Teams' Championships.

== Entry list ==
No.	Entrant	Car	Driver 1	Driver 2	Driver 3
GTP (Grand Touring Prototype) (11 entries)
01	(United States) Cadillac Racing	Cadillac V-Series.R	(France) Sébastien Bourdais	(New Zealand) Scott Dixon	(Netherlands) Renger van der Zande
5	(Germany) Proton Competition Mustang Sampling	Porsche 963	(France) Julien Andlauer	(Italy) Gianmaria Bruni	(Belgium) Alessio Picariello
6	(Germany) Porsche Penske Motorsport	Porsche 963	(France) Mathieu Jaminet	(France) Frédéric Makowiecki	(United Kingdom) Nick Tandy
7	(Germany) Porsche Penske Motorsport	Porsche 963	(United States) Dane Cameron	(Australia) Matt Campbell	(Brazil) Felipe Nasr
10	(United States) Wayne Taylor Racing with Andretti	Acura ARX-06	(Portugal) Filipe Albuquerque	(New Zealand) Brendon Hartley	(United States) Ricky Taylor
24	(United States) BMW M Team RLL	BMW M Hybrid V8	(Austria) Philipp Eng	(Brazil) Augusto Farfus	(Finland) Jesse Krohn
25	(United States) BMW M Team RLL	BMW M Hybrid V8	(United States) Connor De Phillippi	(Belgium) Maxime Martin	(United Kingdom) Nick Yelloly
31	(United States) Whelen Cadillac Racing	Cadillac V-Series.R	(United Kingdom) Jack Aitken	(United Kingdom) Tom Blomqvist	(Brazil) Pipo Derani
40	(United States) Wayne Taylor Racing with Andretti	Acura ARX-06	(Switzerland) Louis Delétraz	(United States) Colton Herta	(United States) Jordan Taylor
63	(Italy) Lamborghini – Iron Lynx	Lamborghini SC63	(Italy) Matteo Cairoli	(Italy) Andrea Caldarelli	(France) Romain Grosjean
85	(United States) JDC–Miller MotorSports	Porsche 963	(United Kingdom) Phil Hanson	(Netherlands) Tijmen van der Helm	(United Kingdom) Richard Westbrook
LMP2 (Le Mans Prototype 2) (13 entries)
04	(United States) CrowdStrike Racing by APR	Oreca 07-Gibson	(United States) Colin Braun	(United States) George Kurtz	(United Kingdom) Toby Sowery
2	(United States) United Autosports USA	Oreca 07-Gibson	(United Kingdom) Ben Hanley	(United States) Ben Keating	(Chile) Nico Pino
8	(United States) Tower Motorsports	Oreca 07-Gibson	(United States) Michael Dinan	(Republic of Ireland) Charlie Eastwood	(Canada) John Farano
11	(France) TDS Racing	Oreca 07-Gibson	(Denmark) Mikkel Jensen	(New Zealand) Hunter McElrea	(United States) Steven Thomas
18	(United States) Era Motorsport	Oreca 07-Gibson	(United Kingdom) Ryan Dalziel	(United States) Dwight Merriman	(United States) Connor Zilisch
20	(Denmark) MDK by High Class Racing	Oreca 07-Gibson	(Denmark) Dennis Andersen	(Germany) Laurents Hörr	(United States) Seth Lucas
22	(United States) United Autosports USA	Oreca 07-Gibson	(United Kingdom) Paul di Resta	(United States) Bijoy Garg	(United States) Dan Goldburg
33	(United States) Sean Creech Motorsport	Ligier JS P217-Gibson	(Portugal) João Barbosa	(United Kingdom) Jonny Edgar	(United States) Lance Willsey
52	(Poland) Inter Europol by PR1/Mathiasen Motorsports	Oreca 07-Gibson	(United States) Nick Boulle	(France) Tom Dillmann	(Poland) Jakub Śmiechowski
74	(United States) Riley	Oreca 07-Gibson	(Australia) Josh Burdon	(Brazil) Felipe Fraga	(United States) Gar Robinson
81	(United States) DragonSpeed	Oreca 07-Gibson	(Sweden) Henrik Hedman	(Denmark) Malthe Jakobsen	(Sweden) Rasmus Lindh
88	(Italy) Richard Mille AF Corse	Oreca 07-Gibson	(Denmark) Nicklas Nielsen	(Argentina) Luis Pérez Companc	(France) Lilou Wadoux
99	(United States) AO Racing	Oreca 07-Gibson	(Australia) Matthew Brabham	(France) Paul-Loup Chatin	(United States) P. J. Hyett
GTD Pro (GT Daytona Pro) (12 entries)
1	(United States) Paul Miller Racing	BMW M4 GT3	(United States) Bryan Sellers	(United States) Madison Snow	(United States) Neil Verhagen
3	(United States) Corvette Racing by Pratt Miller Motorsports	Chevrolet Corvette Z06 GT3.R	(Spain) Antonio García	(Spain) Daniel Juncadella	(United Kingdom) Alexander Sims
4	(United States) Corvette Racing by Pratt Miller Motorsports	Chevrolet Corvette Z06 GT3.R	(New Zealand) Earl Bamber	(Netherlands) Nicky Catsburg	(United States) Tommy Milner
9	(Canada) Pfaff Motorsports	McLaren 720S GT3 Evo	(Canada) James Hinchcliffe	(United Kingdom) Oliver Jarvis	(Germany) Marvin Kirchhöfer
14	(United States) Vasser Sullivan	Lexus RC F GT3	(United Kingdom) Ben Barnicoat	(United Kingdom) Jack Hawksworth	(United States) Kyle Kirkwood
19	(Italy) Iron Lynx	Lamborghini Huracán GT3 Evo 2	(Italy) Mirko Bortolotti	(South Africa) Jordan Pepper	(France) Franck Perera
23	(United States) Heart of Racing Team	Aston Martin Vantage AMR GT3 Evo	(Germany) Mario Farnbacher	(United Kingdom) Ross Gunn	(Spain) Alex Riberas
60	(Italy) Iron Lynx	Lamborghini Huracán GT3 Evo 2	(Italy) Matteo Cressoni	(Italy) Leonardo Pulcini	(Italy) Claudio Schiavoni
62	(United States) Risi Competizione	Ferrari 296 GT3	(United Kingdom) James Calado	(Italy) Davide Rigon	(Brazil) Daniel Serra
64	(Canada) Ford Multimatic Motorsports	Ford Mustang GT3	(Germany) Christopher Mies	(Germany) Mike Rockenfeller	(United Kingdom) Harry Tincknell
65	(Canada) Ford Multimatic Motorsports	Ford Mustang GT3	(United States) Joey Hand	(Germany) Dirk Müller	(Belgium) Frédéric Vervisch
77	(United States) AO Racing	Porsche 911 GT3 R (992)	(Denmark) Michael Christensen	(Germany) Laurin Heinrich	(United Kingdom) Sebastian Priaulx
GTD (GT Daytona) (22 entries)
023	(United States) Triarsi Competizione	Ferrari 296 GT3	(Italy) Alessio Rovera	(United States) Charlie Scardina	(United States) Onofrio Triarsi
12	(United States) Vasser Sullivan	Lexus RC F GT3	(United States) Frankie Montecalvo	(United States) Aaron Telitz	(Canada) Parker Thompson
13	(Canada) AWA	Chevrolet Corvette Z06 GT3.R	(United Kingdom) Matt Bell	(Canada) Orey Fidani	(Germany) Lars Kern
17	(Canada) AWA	Chevrolet Corvette Z06 GT3.R	(Canada) Anthony Mantella	(United States) Thomas Merrill	(Argentina) Nicolás Varrone
21	(Italy) AF Corse	Ferrari 296 GT3	(France) François Heriau	(United Kingdom) Simon Mann	(Spain) Miguel Molina
27	(United States) Heart of Racing Team	Aston Martin Vantage AMR GT3 Evo	(Canada) Roman De Angelis	(United Kingdom) Ian James	(Canada) Zacharie Robichon
32	(United States) Korthoff/Preston Motorsports	Mercedes-AMG GT3 Evo	(Canada) Mikaël Grenier	(United States) Kenton Koch	(United States) Mike Skeen
34	(United States) Conquest Racing	Ferrari 296 GT3	(Spain) Albert Costa	(United States) Manny Franco	(Monaco) Cédric Sbirrazzuoli
43	(United States) Andretti Motorsports	Porsche 911 GT3 R (992)	(United States) Jarett Andretti	(Colombia) Gabby Chaves	(Canada) Scott Hargrove
44	(United States) Magnus Racing	Aston Martin Vantage AMR GT3 Evo	(United States) Andy Lally	(United States) John Potter	(United States) Spencer Pumpelly
45	(United States) Wayne Taylor Racing with Andretti	Lamborghini Huracán GT3 Evo 2	(United States) Graham Doyle	(Costa Rica) Danny Formal	(Canada) Kyle Marcelli
47	(Italy) Cetilar Racing	Ferrari 296 GT3	(Italy) Antonio Fuoco	(Italy) Roberto Lacorte	(Italy) Giorgio Sernagiotto
55	(Germany) Proton Competition	Ford Mustang GT3	(United States) Ryan Hardwick	(Italy) Giammarco Levorato	(United States) Corey Lewis
57	(United States) Winward Racing	Mercedes-AMG GT3 Evo	(Netherlands) Indy Dontje	(Switzerland) Philip Ellis	(United States) Russell Ward
66	(United States) Gradient Racing	Acura NSX GT3 Evo22	(Colombia) Tatiana Calderón	(United Kingdom) Katherine Legge	(United States) Sheena Monk
70	(United Kingdom) Inception Racing	McLaren 720S GT3 Evo	(United States) Brendan Iribe	(United Kingdom) Ollie Millroy	(Denmark) Frederik Schandorff
78	(United States) Forte Racing	Lamborghini Huracán GT3 Evo 2	(Canada) Devlin DeFrancesco	(Canada) Misha Goikhberg	(Italy) Loris Spinelli
80	(United States) Lone Star Racing	Mercedes-AMG GT3 Evo	(Angola) Rui Andrade	(Australia) Scott Andrews	(Turkey) Salih Yoluç
83	(Italy) Iron Dames	Lamborghini Huracán GT3 Evo 2	(Belgium) Sarah Bovy	(Switzerland) Rahel Frey	(Denmark) Michelle Gatting
86	(United States) MDK Motorsports	Porsche 911 GT3 R (992)	(Austria) Klaus Bachler	(Denmark) Anders Fjordbach	(China) Kerong Li
96	(United States) Turner Motorsport	BMW M4 GT3	(United States) Robby Foley	(United States) Patrick Gallagher	(United States) Jake Walker
120	(United States) Wright Motorsports	Porsche 911 GT3 R (992)	(United States) Adam Adelson	(Belgium) Jan Heylen	(United States) Elliott Skeer

== Practice ==
Three practice sessions were held before the race, all of them on Thursday. All sessions lasted for 90 minutes.

In the first session, Renger van der Zande set the fastest lap in the No. 01 CGR Cadillac at 1 minute, 48.279 seconds, 0.479 seconds faster than Aitken's No. 31 WCR car. Nick Tandy put the No. 6 Penske Porsche in third overall. Hartley and his teammate Delétraz were fourth and fifth for WTR. Mikkel Jensen led LMP2 in TDS Racing's No. 11 car with a 1:51.342 second lap, 0.021 seconds ahead of di Resta's No. 22 United Autosports Oreca. In GTD Pro, the No. 14 VasserSullivan Lexus of Jack Hawksworth led with a lap of 2 minutes, 00.202 seconds. Daniel Serra put the No. 62 Risi Ferrari second. Thompson's No. 12 Vasser Sullivan car paced GTD, followed by Grenier's No. 32 Korthoff Mercedes-AMG. The session saw one red flag: the No. 5 Proton Competition Mustang Sampling Porsche stopped on track early in the session, with Gianmaria Bruni at the wheel.

In the second session, Hanson's No. 85 JDC Porsche lapped quickest at 1:48.149, ahead of the No. 01 Cadillac of Bourdais and Derani's No. 31 WCR car. WTR were fourth after a lap by Delétraz, and Mathieu Jaminet's No. 6 Penske Porsche was fifth. Burdon led LMP2 with a 1:52.078 lap in Riley's No. 74 Oreca, 0.136 seconds ahead of Toby Sowery's CrowdStrike car. Hawksworth led GTD Pro in Vasser Sullivan's No. 14 car, followed by Rigon's No. 62 Risi Ferrari. In GTD, Thompson was again fastest in class, followed by Spinelli's No. 78 Forte vehicle. One red flag was shown during the session: Davide Rigon stopped on track mid-session in the No. 62 Risi Competizione Ferrari.

Van der Zande led the final session in the No. 01 car with a lap of 1 minute, 49.179 seconds. Farfus' No. 24 BMW was second-fastest. Albuquerque was third in the No. 10 WTR Acura and Blomqvist in the No. 31 WCR Cadillac was fourth. The fastest Porsche was Jaminet's No. 6 Penske in fifth. Jensen led in LMP2 for TDS Racing with a 1-minute, 51.497 lap, from AO Racing's Paul-Loup Chatin and Ben Hanley's No. 2 United Autosports car. Bamber's 2:00.790 lap led the GTD Pro class in Corvette's No. 4 car, 0.319 seconds faster than Verhagen's No. 1 Paul Miller BMW; Laurin Heinrich's No. 77 AO Porsche was third. Antonio Fuoco's No. 47 Cetilar Ferari recorded the fastest time amongst all GTD cars, followed by Philip Ellis' No. 57 Winward car. The session had three stoppages. Jonny Edgar's Sean Creech Ligier caused the first stoppage when Edgar stopped the car on track early in the session. Tom Dillmann's PR1/Mathiasen car caused the second stoppage after making contact with GTD cars. The session ended prematurely when Colin Braun crashed the No. 04 CrowdStrike car into the tire barriers at turn seventeen.

== Qualifying ==
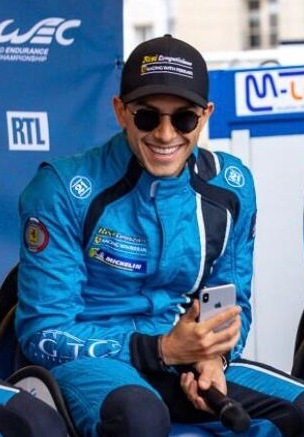
Pipo Derani (pictured in 2019) helped take the No. 31 Cadillac's second pole position of 2024.

Friday's afternoon qualifying session was broken into three sessions, with one session for the GTP, LMP2, and the GTD classes, which lasted 15 minutes each. The rules dictated that all teams nominated a driver to qualify their cars, with the Pro-Am LMP2 class requiring a Bronze rated driver to qualify the car. The competitors' fastest lap times determined the starting order. IMSA then arranged the grid to put GTPs ahead of the LMP2, GTD Pro, and GTD cars.

Pipo Derani in the No. 31 WCR Cadillac took his second consecutive pole position of the season with a lap of 1 minute 48.152 seconds. He was joined on the front row by Bourdais whose best lap in the No. 01 CGR Cadillac was 0.147 seconds slower. Delétraz qualified the No. 40 WTR Acura third, and Philipp Eng in the No. 24 BMW took fourth. The fastest Porsche was Nasr's No. 7 Penske Porsche 963 in fifth. The session saw one incident when Mathieu Jaminet in the No. 6 Penske Porsche entry crashed at turn one. Jaminet had his best two laps from the session deleted for causing a red flag, effectively leaving him with no time set. The No. 10 WTR entry lost all its lap times due to the car being worked on during the red flag.

Hyett took the LMP2 pole for AO Racing with a 1:52.142 lap. The two United Autosport Orecas were second and third (the No. 22 car driven by Goldburg in front of the No. 2 vehicle of Keating). Boulle's No. 52 PR1 car was fourth and Robinson's No. 74 Riley vehicle qualified fifth. The session ended prematurely when Andersen's MDK by High Class Racing car stopped on track. Andersen had his best two laps from the session deleted for causing a red flag.

In the GT session, Jack hawksworth set a new qualifying track record for GTD Pro to take pole position for Vasser Sullivan, with a lap of 1:58.714. Hawksworth was 0.550 seconds faster than Farnbacher's second placed No. 23 Aston Martin. Prialux qualified the No. 77 Porsche third. Sims and his teammate Milner would start at the back of the GTD Pro field after their cars failed post post-qualifying technical inspection where it was discovered that their Corvettes diffusers had been modified. As a result, Perera would start from fourth. Philip Ellis set the fastest time in the GTD class in the No. 57 Winward car. However, the team were sent to the back of the GTD grid after the car failed post-qualifying technical inspection where it was discovered that the Mecredes-AMG had installed non permitted sensors. As a result, Antonio Fuoco's No. 47 Cetilar Ferrari was promoted to pole position. Thompson's No. 12 Lexus started in second position followed by Grenier's No. 32 Korthoff car in third. The No. 83 Iron Danes Lamborghini failed to record a time after Sarah Bovy suffered a puncture on her out lap.

=== Qualifying results ===
Pole positions in each class are indicated in bold and with ‡.

Pos.	Class	No.	Entry	Driver	Time	Gap	Grid
1	**GTP**	**31**	**(United States) Whelen Cadillac Racing**	**(Brazil) Pipo Derani**	**1:48.152**	—	1‡
2	GTP	01	(United States) Cadillac Racing	(France) Sébastien Bourdais	1:48.299	+0.147	2
3	GTP	40	(United States) Wayne Taylor Racing with Andretti	(Switzerland) Louis Delétraz	1:48.593	+0.441	3
4	GTP	24	(United States) BMW M Team RLL	(Austria) Philipp Eng	1:48.829	+0.677	4
5	GTP	7	(Germany) Porsche Penske Motorsport	(Brazil) Felipe Nasr	1:49.179	+1.027	5
6	GTP	85	(United States) JDC–Miller MotorSports	(United Kingdom) Phil Hanson	1:49.258	+1.106	6
7	GTP	5	(Germany) Proton Competition Mustang Sampling	(France) Julien Andlauer	1:49.274	+1.122	7
8	**LMP2**	**99**	**(United States) AO Racing**	**(United States) P. J. Hyett**	**1:52.142**	**+3.990**	12‡
9	LMP2	22	(United States) United Autosports USA	(United States) Dan Goldburg	1:52.313	+4.161	13
10	LMP2	2	(United States) United Autosports USA	(United States) Ben Keating	1:52.673	+4.521	14
11	LMP2	52	(Poland) Inter Europol by PR1/Mathiasen Motorsports	(United States) Nick Boulle	1:52.765	+4.613	15
12	LMP2	74	(United States) Riley	(United States) Gar Robinson	1:53.278	+5.126	16
13	LMP2	04	(United States) CrowdStrike Racing by APR	(United States) George Kurtz	1:53.526	+5.374	17
14	GTP	63	(Italy) Lamborghini – Iron Lynx	(Italy) Matteo Cairoli	1:53.574	+5.422	8
15	LMP2	11	(France) TDS Racing	(United States) Steven Thomas	1:53.582	+5.430	18
16	LMP2	88	(Italy) Richard Mille AF Corse	(Argentina) Luis Pérez Companc	1:54.281	+6.129	19
17	GTP	25	(United States) BMW M Team RLL	(United States) Connor De Phillippi	1:54.364	+6.212	9
18	LMP2	81	(United States) DragonSpeed	(Sweden) Henrik Hedman	1:54.470	+6.318	20
19	LMP2	18	(United States) Era Motorsport	(United States) Dwight Merriman	1:54.977	+6.825	21
20	LMP2	20	(Denmark) MDK by High Class Racing	(Denmark) Dennis Andersen	1:55.454^{1}	+7.302	22
21	LMP2	8	(United States) Tower Motorsports	(Canada) John Farano	1:56.154	+8.002	23
22	LMP2	33	(United States) Sean Creech Motorsport	(United States) Lance Willsey	1:57.324	+9.172	24
23	**GTD Pro**	**14**	**(United States) Vasser Sullivan**	**(United Kingdom) Jack Hawksworth**	**1:58.714**	**+10.562**	25‡
24	GTD	57	(United States) Winward Racing	(Switzerland) Philip Ellis	1:58.778	+10.626	54^{2}
25	**GTD**	**47**	**(Italy) Cetilar Racing**	**(Italy) Antonio Fuoco**	**1:59.014**	**+10.862**	26‡
26	GTD	12	(United States) Vasser Sullivan	(Canada) Parker Thompson	1:59.143	+10.991	27
27	GTD Pro	23	(United States) Heart of Racing Team	(Germany) Mario Farnbacher	1:59.264	+11.112	28
28	GTD	32	(United States) Korthoff/Preston Motorsports	(Canada) Mikaël Grenier	1:59.350	+11.198	29
29	GTD Pro	77	(United States) AO Racing	(United Kingdom) Sebastian Priaulx	1:59.446	+11.294	30
30	GTD Pro	3	(United States) Corvette Racing by Pratt Miller Motorsports	(United Kingdom) Alexander Sims	1:59.508	+11.356	55^{3}
31	GTD Pro	19	(Italy) Iron Lynx	(France) Franck Perera	1:59.517	+11.365	31
32	GTD Pro	62	(United States) Risi Competizione	(Italy) Davide Rigon	1:59.534	+11.382	32
33	GTD Pro	1	(United States) Paul Miller Racing	(United States) Madison Snow	1:59.586	+11.434	33
34	GTD Pro	4	(United States) Corvette Racing by Pratt Miller Motorsports	(United States) Tommy Milner	1:59.786	+11.634	56^{3}
35	GTD	78	(United States) Forte Racing	(Italy) Loris Spinelli	1:59.797	+11.645	34
36	GTD	80	(United States) Lone Star Racing	(Australia) Scott Andrews	1:59.865	+11.713	35
37	GTD Pro	9	(Canada) Pfaff Motorsports	(United Kingdom) Oliver Jarvis	1:59.883	+11.731	36
38	GTD Pro	64	(Canada) Ford Multimatic Motorsports	(Germany) Mike Rockenfeller	1:59.916	+11.764	37
39	GTD	023	(United States) Triarsi Competizione	(Italy) Alessio Rovera	2:00.334	+12.182	53^{4}
40	GTD	21	(Italy) AF Corse	(United Kingdom) Simon Mann	2:00.396	+12.244	38
41	GTD	70	(United Kingdom) Inception Racing	(United States) Brendan Iribe	2:00.427	+12.275	39
42	GTD	96	(United States) Turner Motorsport	(United States) Patrick Gallagher	2:00.459	+12.307	40
43	GTD	45	(United States) Wayne Taylor Racing with Andretti	(Canada) Kyle Marcelli	2:00.633	+12.481	41
44	GTD Pro	65	(Canada) Ford Multimatic Motorsports	(United States) Joey Hand	2:00.719	+12.567	42
45	GTD	55	(Germany) Proton Competition	(Italy) Giammarco Levorato	2:00.752	+12.600	43
46	GTD	34	(United States) Conquest Racing	(United States) Manny Franco	2:00.859	+12.707	44
47	GTD	66	(United States) Gradient Racing	(United States) Sheena Monk	2:01.064	+12.912	45
48	GTD	120	(United States) Wright Motorsports	(United States) Adam Adelson	2:01.364	+13.212	46
49	GTD	44	(United States) Magnus Racing	(United States) John Potter	2:01.513	+13.361	47
50	GTD	27	(United States) Heart of Racing Team	(United Kingdom) Ian James	2:01.555	+13.403	48
51	GTD	43	(United States) Andretti Motorsports	(Colombia) Gabby Chaves	2:01.958	+13.806	49
52	GTD	86	(United States) MDK Motorsports	(China) Kerong Li	2:03.970	+15.818	50
53	GTD	13	(Canada) AWA	(Canada) Orey Fidani	2:05.079	+16.927	57^{5}
54	GTD	17	(Canada) AWA	(Canada) Anthony Mantella	2:05.089	+16.937	58^{5}
55	GTD Pro	60	(Italy) Iron Lynx	(Italy) Claudio Schiavoni	2:05.169	+17.017	51
56	GTP	6	(Germany) Porsche Penske Motorsport	(France) Mathieu Jaminet	No time^{6}		10
57	GTP	10	(United States) Wayne Taylor Racing with Andretti	(United States) Ricky Taylor	No time^{7}		11
58	GTD	83	(Italy) Iron Dames	No Time Established			52
Sources:

- ^{1} The No. 20 MDK by High Class Racing entry had its two fastest laps deleted as penalty for causing a red flag during its qualifying session.
- ^{2} The No. 57 Winward Racing entry initially qualified on pole position for the GTD class. However, the car was found to have installed non permitted sensors. By IMSA rules, the entry was moved to the rear of the GTD field on the starting grid.
- ^{3} The No. 3 and No. 4 Corvette Racing entries were moved to the back of the GTD Pro classification as per Article 2.2.5 of the GTD Pro and GTD Technical regulations (car homologation was modified).
- ^{4} The No. 023 Triarsi Competizione entry was moved to the back of the GTD class as per Article 40.2.3 of the Sporting regulations (change of starting driver).
- ^{5} The No. 13 and No. 17 AWA entries were moved to the back of the GTD classification as per Article 2.2.5 of the GTD Pro and GTD Technical regulations (car homologation was modified).
- ^{6} The No. 6 Porsche Penske Motorsport entry had its two fastest laps deleted as penalty for causing a red flag during its qualifying session.
- ^{7} The No. 10 Wayne Taylor Racing entry had all qualifying laps forfeited as per Article 40.2.10. of the Sporting regulations (car was touched by the crew during qualifying without permission by the officials).

== Post-race ==
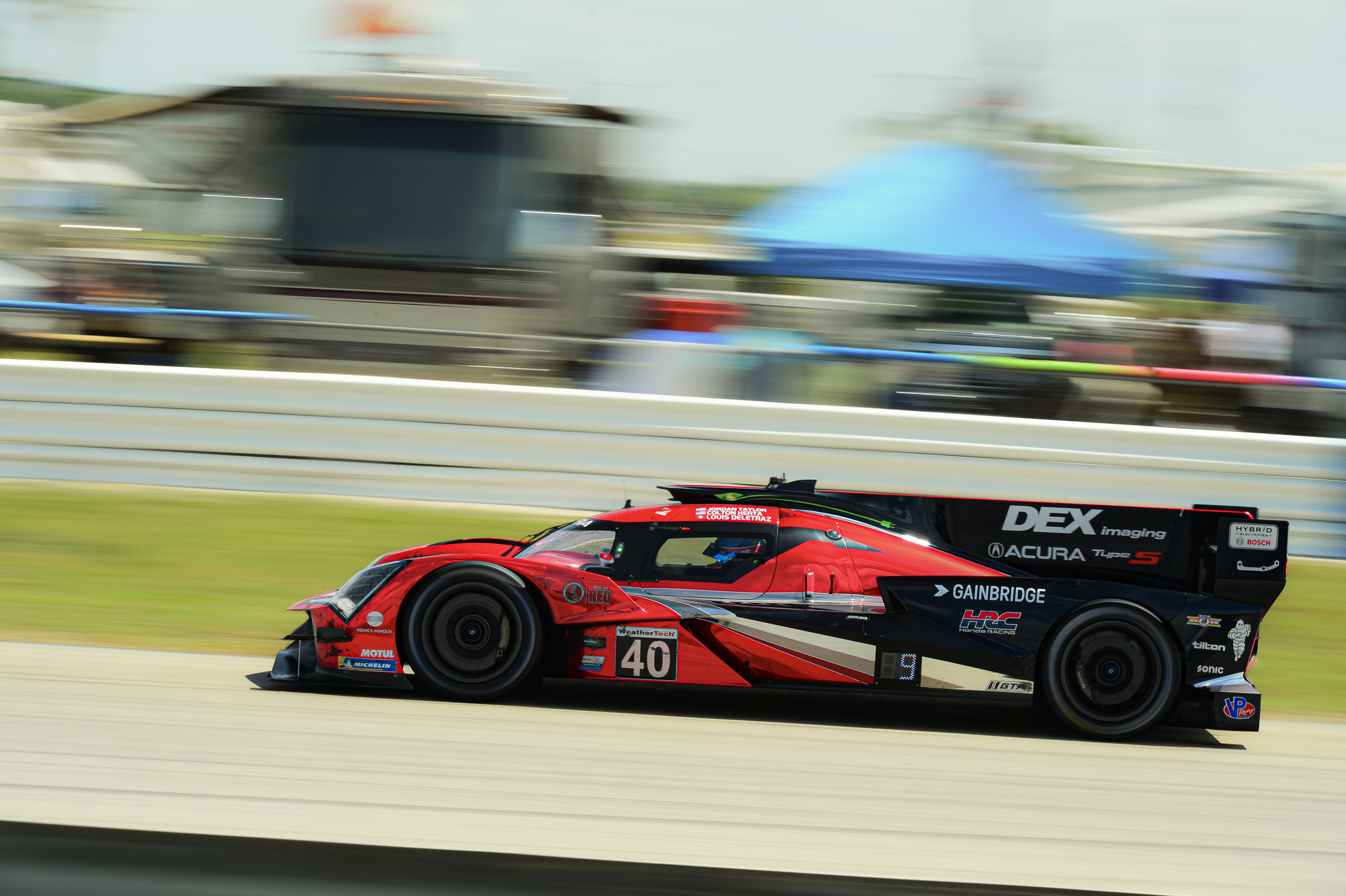
The GTP race-winning No. 40 Acura ARX-06 of Wayne Taylor Racing

The final results kept Cameron, Campbell, and Nasr atop the GTP Drivers' Championship with 706 points on countback over race winners Louis Delétraz, Colton Herta, and Jordan Taylor. With a total of 741 points, Dalziel, Merriman and Zilisch's victory allowed them to extend their advantage to 127 points in the LMP2 Drivers' Championship while Burdon, Fraga, and Robinson took over second place. The final results of GTD Pro meant Calado, Rigon, and Serra extended their advantage to 98 points as Sellers, Snow, and Verhagen advanced to second. Barnucoat, Hawksworth, and Kirkwood jumped from eleventh to third while Christensen, Heinrich, and Priaulx dropped to fourth. With 725 points, Dontje, Ellis, and Ward's victory allowed them to extend their advantage in the GTD Drivers' Championship to 136 points. Fuocco, Lacorte, and Sernagiotto moved from tenth to second with 589 points, 19 in front of Adelson, Heylen, and Skeer. Mercedes-AMG continued to top the GTD Manufactures' Championship while Cadillac and Lexus became the leaders of their respective Manufactures' Championships. Porsche Penske Motorsport, Era Motorsport, Risi Competizione, and Winward Racing kept their respective advantages in their of Teams' Championships with nine rounds remaining.

=== Race results ===
Class winners are denoted in bold and with ‡.

Pos	Class	No	Team	Drivers	Chassis	Laps	Time/Retired
Pos	Class	No	Team	Drivers	Engine	Laps	Time/Retired
1	**GTP**	**40**	**(United States) Wayne Taylor Racing with Andretti**	**(Switzerland) Louis Delétraz (United States) Colton Herta (United States) Jordan Taylor**	**Acura ARX-06**	**333**	**12:00:54.520‡**
1	**GTP**	**40**	**(United States) Wayne Taylor Racing with Andretti**	**(Switzerland) Louis Delétraz (United States) Colton Herta (United States) Jordan Taylor**	**Acura AR24e 2.4 L twin-turbo V6**	**333**	**12:00:54.520‡**
2	GTP	01	(United States) Cadillac Racing	(France) Sébastien Bourdais (New Zealand) Scott Dixon (Netherlands) Renger van der Zande	Cadillac V-Series.R	333	+0.891
2	GTP	01	(United States) Cadillac Racing	(France) Sébastien Bourdais (New Zealand) Scott Dixon (Netherlands) Renger van der Zande	Cadillac LMC55R 5.5 L V8	333	+0.891
3	GTP	7	(Germany) Porsche Penske Motorsport	(United States) Dane Cameron (Australia) Matt Campbell (Brazil) Felipe Nasr	Porsche 963	333	+8.898
3	GTP	7	(Germany) Porsche Penske Motorsport	(United States) Dane Cameron (Australia) Matt Campbell (Brazil) Felipe Nasr	Porsche 9RD 4.6 L twin-turbo V8	333	+8.898
4	GTP	25	(United States) BMW M Team RLL	(United States) Connor De Phillippi (Belgium) Maxime Martin (United Kingdom) Nick Yelloly	BMW M Hybrid V8	333	+12.056
4	GTP	25	(United States) BMW M Team RLL	(United States) Connor De Phillippi (Belgium) Maxime Martin (United Kingdom) Nick Yelloly	BMW P66/3 4.0 L twin-turbo V8	333	+12.056
5	GTP	10	(United States) Wayne Taylor Racing with Andretti	(Portugal) Filipe Albuquerque (New Zealand) Brendon Hartley (United States) Ricky Taylor	Acura ARX-06	333	+13.398
5	GTP	10	(United States) Wayne Taylor Racing with Andretti	(Portugal) Filipe Albuquerque (New Zealand) Brendon Hartley (United States) Ricky Taylor	Acura AR24e 2.4 L twin-turbo V6	333	+13.398
6	GTP	24	(United States) BMW M Team RLL	(Austria) Philipp Eng (Brazil) Augusto Farfus (Finland) Jesse Krohn	BMW M Hybrid V8	333	+28.438
6	GTP	24	(United States) BMW M Team RLL	(Austria) Philipp Eng (Brazil) Augusto Farfus (Finland) Jesse Krohn	BMW P66/3 4.0 L twin-turbo V8	333	+28.438
7	GTP	63	(Italy) Lamborghini – Iron Lynx	(Italy) Matteo Cairoli (Italy) Andrea Caldarelli (France) Romain Grosjean	Lamborghini SC63	333	+28.501
7	GTP	63	(Italy) Lamborghini – Iron Lynx	(Italy) Matteo Cairoli (Italy) Andrea Caldarelli (France) Romain Grosjean	Lamborghini 3.8 L twin-turbo V8	333	+28.501
8	GTP	5	(Germany) Proton Competition Mustang Sampling	(France) Julien Andlauer (Italy) Gianmaria Bruni (Belgium) Alessio Picariello	Porsche 963	333	+44.807
8	GTP	5	(Germany) Proton Competition Mustang Sampling	(France) Julien Andlauer (Italy) Gianmaria Bruni (Belgium) Alessio Picariello	Porsche 9RD 4.6 L twin-turbo V8	333	+44.807
9	GTP	6	(Germany) Porsche Penske Motorsport	(France) Mathieu Jaminet (France) Frédéric Makowiecki (United Kingdom) Nick Tandy	Porsche 963	331	+2 Laps
9	GTP	6	(Germany) Porsche Penske Motorsport	(France) Mathieu Jaminet (France) Frédéric Makowiecki (United Kingdom) Nick Tandy	Porsche 9RD 4.6 L twin-turbo V8	331	+2 Laps
10	**LMP2**	**18**	**(United States) Era Motorsport**	**(United Kingdom) Ryan Dalziel (United States) Dwight Merriman (United States) Connor Zilisch**	**Oreca 07**	**330**	**+3 Laps‡**
10	**LMP2**	**18**	**(United States) Era Motorsport**	**(United Kingdom) Ryan Dalziel (United States) Dwight Merriman (United States) Connor Zilisch**	**Gibson GK428 4.2 L V8**	**330**	**+3 Laps‡**
11	LMP2	11	(France) TDS Racing	(Denmark) Mikkel Jensen (New Zealand) Hunter McElrea (United States) Steven Thomas	Oreca 07	330	+3 Laps
11	LMP2	11	(France) TDS Racing	(Denmark) Mikkel Jensen (New Zealand) Hunter McElrea (United States) Steven Thomas	Gibson GK428 4.2 L V8	330	+3 Laps
12	LMP2	22	(United States) United Autosports USA	(United Kingdom) Paul di Resta (United States) Bijoy Garg (United States) Dan Goldburg	Oreca 07	330	+3 Laps
12	LMP2	22	(United States) United Autosports USA	(United Kingdom) Paul di Resta (United States) Bijoy Garg (United States) Dan Goldburg	Gibson GK428 4.2 L V8	330	+3 Laps
13	LMP2	33	(United States) Sean Creech Motorsport	(Portugal) João Barbosa (United Kingdom) Jonny Edgar (United States) Lance Willsey	Ligier JS P217	330	+3 Laps
13	LMP2	33	(United States) Sean Creech Motorsport	(Portugal) João Barbosa (United Kingdom) Jonny Edgar (United States) Lance Willsey	Gibson GK428 4.2 L V8	330	+3 Laps
14	LMP2	74	(United States) Riley	(Australia) Josh Burdon (Brazil) Felipe Fraga (United States) Gar Robinson	Oreca 07	330	+3 Laps
14	LMP2	74	(United States) Riley	(Australia) Josh Burdon (Brazil) Felipe Fraga (United States) Gar Robinson	Gibson GK428 4.2 L V8	330	+3 Laps
15	LMP2	52	(Poland) Inter Europol by PR1/Mathiasen Motorsports	(United States) Nick Boulle (France) Tom Dillmann (Poland) Jakub Śmiechowski	Oreca 07	330	+3 Laps
15	LMP2	52	(Poland) Inter Europol by PR1/Mathiasen Motorsports	(United States) Nick Boulle (France) Tom Dillmann (Poland) Jakub Śmiechowski	Gibson GK428 4.2 L V8	330	+3 Laps
16	LMP2	81	(United States) DragonSpeed	(Sweden) Henrik Hedman (Denmark) Malthe Jakobsen (Sweden) Rasmus Lindh	Oreca 07	330	+3 Laps
16	LMP2	81	(United States) DragonSpeed	(Sweden) Henrik Hedman (Denmark) Malthe Jakobsen (Sweden) Rasmus Lindh	Gibson GK428 4.2 L V8	330	+3 Laps
17	LMP2	20	(Denmark) MDK by High Class Racing	(Denmark) Dennis Andersen (Germany) Laurents Hörr (United States) Seth Lucas	Oreca 07	330	+3 Laps
17	LMP2	20	(Denmark) MDK by High Class Racing	(Denmark) Dennis Andersen (Germany) Laurents Hörr (United States) Seth Lucas	Gibson GK428 4.2 L V8	330	+3 Laps
18	LMP2	04	(United States) CrowdStrike Racing by APR	(United States) Colin Braun (United States) George Kurtz (United Kingdom) Toby Sowery	Oreca 07	330	+3 Laps
18	LMP2	04	(United States) CrowdStrike Racing by APR	(United States) Colin Braun (United States) George Kurtz (United Kingdom) Toby Sowery	Gibson GK428 4.2 L V8	330	+3 Laps
19	LMP2	2	(United States) United Autosports USA	(United Kingdom) Ben Hanley (United States) Ben Keating (Chile) Nico Pino	Oreca 07	329	+4 Laps
19	LMP2	2	(United States) United Autosports USA	(United Kingdom) Ben Hanley (United States) Ben Keating (Chile) Nico Pino	Gibson GK428 4.2 L V8	329	+4 Laps
20	**GTD Pro**	**14**	**(United States) Vasser Sullivan**	**(United Kingdom) Ben Barnicoat (United Kingdom) Jack Hawksworth (United States) Kyle Kirkwood**	**Lexus RC F GT3**	**316**	**+17 Laps‡**
20	**GTD Pro**	**14**	**(United States) Vasser Sullivan**	**(United Kingdom) Ben Barnicoat (United Kingdom) Jack Hawksworth (United States) Kyle Kirkwood**	**Toyota 2UR-GSE 5.0 L V8**	**316**	**+17 Laps‡**
21	GTD Pro	62	(United States) Risi Competizione	(United Kingdom) James Calado (Italy) Davide Rigon (Brazil) Daniel Serra	Ferrari 296 GT3	316	+17 Laps
21	GTD Pro	62	(United States) Risi Competizione	(United Kingdom) James Calado (Italy) Davide Rigon (Brazil) Daniel Serra	Ferrari F163 3.0 L Turbo V6	316	+17 Laps
22	GTD Pro	19	(Italy) Iron Lynx	(Italy) Mirko Bortolotti (South Africa) Jordan Pepper (France) Franck Perera	Lamborghini Huracán GT3 Evo 2	316	+17 Laps
22	GTD Pro	19	(Italy) Iron Lynx	(Italy) Mirko Bortolotti (South Africa) Jordan Pepper (France) Franck Perera	Lamborghini DGF 5.2 L V10	316	+17 Laps
23	GTD Pro	1	(United States) Paul Miller Racing	(United States) Bryan Sellers (United States) Madison Snow (United States) Neil Verhagen	BMW M4 GT3	316	+17 Laps
23	GTD Pro	1	(United States) Paul Miller Racing	(United States) Bryan Sellers (United States) Madison Snow (United States) Neil Verhagen	BMW S58B30T0 3.0 L Turbo I6	316	+17 Laps
24	GTD Pro	23	(United States) Heart of Racing Team	(Germany) Mario Farnbacher (United Kingdom) Ross Gunn (Spain) Alex Riberas	Aston Martin Vantage AMR GT3 Evo	316	+17 Laps
24	GTD Pro	23	(United States) Heart of Racing Team	(Germany) Mario Farnbacher (United Kingdom) Ross Gunn (Spain) Alex Riberas	Aston Martin M177 4.0 L Turbo V8	316	+17 Laps
25	GTD Pro	60	(Italy) Iron Lynx	(Italy) Matteo Cressoni (Italy) Leonardo Pulcini (Italy) Claudio Schiavoni	Lamborghini Huracán GT3 Evo 2	316	+17 Laps
25	GTD Pro	60	(Italy) Iron Lynx	(Italy) Matteo Cressoni (Italy) Leonardo Pulcini (Italy) Claudio Schiavoni	Lamborghini DGF 5.2 L V10	316	+17 Laps
26	GTD Pro	64	(Canada) Ford Multimatic Motorsports	(Germany) Christopher Mies (Germany) Mike Rockenfeller (United Kingdom) Harry Tincknell	Ford Mustang GT3	316	+17 Laps
26	GTD Pro	64	(Canada) Ford Multimatic Motorsports	(Germany) Christopher Mies (Germany) Mike Rockenfeller (United Kingdom) Harry Tincknell	Ford Coyote 5.4 L V8	316	+17 Laps
27	GTD Pro	65	(Canada) Ford Multimatic Motorsports	(United States) Joey Hand (Germany) Dirk Müller (Belgium) Frédéric Vervisch	Ford Mustang GT3	316	+17 Laps
27	GTD Pro	65	(Canada) Ford Multimatic Motorsports	(United States) Joey Hand (Germany) Dirk Müller (Belgium) Frédéric Vervisch	Ford Coyote 5.4 L V8	316	+17 Laps
28	GTD Pro	77	(United States) AO Racing	(Denmark) Michael Christensen (Germany) Laurin Heinrich (United Kingdom) Sebastian Priaulx	Porsche 911 GT3 R (992)	316	+17 Laps (Note: The No. 77 AO Racing entry received a 35-second time penalty for an unserved drive-through, dropping it from 21st to 28th overall, and from 2nd to 9th in GTD Pro.)
28	GTD Pro	77	(United States) AO Racing	(Denmark) Michael Christensen (Germany) Laurin Heinrich (United Kingdom) Sebastian Priaulx	Porsche M97/80 4.2 L Flat-6	316	+17 Laps
29	**GTD**	**57**	**(United States) Winward Racing**	**(Netherlands) Indy Dontje (Switzerland) Philip Ellis (United States) Russell Ward**	**Mercedes-AMG GT3 Evo**	**314**	**+19 Laps‡**
29	**GTD**	**57**	**(United States) Winward Racing**	**(Netherlands) Indy Dontje (Switzerland) Philip Ellis (United States) Russell Ward**	**Mercedes-AMG M159 6.2 L V8**	**314**	**+19 Laps‡**
30	GTD	47	(Italy) Cetilar Racing	(Italy) Antonio Fuoco (Italy) Roberto Lacorte (Italy) Giorgio Sernagiotto	Ferrari 296 GT3	314	+19 Laps
30	GTD	47	(Italy) Cetilar Racing	(Italy) Antonio Fuoco (Italy) Roberto Lacorte (Italy) Giorgio Sernagiotto	Ferrari F163 3.0 L Turbo V6	314	+19 Laps
31	GTD	120	(United States) Wright Motorsports	(United States) Adam Adelson (Belgium) Jan Heylen (United States) Elliott Skeer	Porsche 911 GT3 R (992)	314	+19 Laps
31	GTD	120	(United States) Wright Motorsports	(United States) Adam Adelson (Belgium) Jan Heylen (United States) Elliott Skeer	Porsche M97/80 4.2 L Flat-6	314	+19 Laps
32	GTD	27	(United States) Heart of Racing Team	(Canada) Roman De Angelis (United Kingdom) Ian James (Canada) Zacharie Robichon	Aston Martin Vantage AMR GT3 Evo	314	+19 Laps
32	GTD	27	(United States) Heart of Racing Team	(Canada) Roman De Angelis (United Kingdom) Ian James (Canada) Zacharie Robichon	Aston Martin M177 4.0 L Turbo V8	314	+19 Laps
33	GTD	78	(United States) Forte Racing	(Canada) Devlin DeFrancesco (Canada) Misha Goikhberg (Italy) Loris Spinelli	Lamborghini Huracán GT3 Evo 2	314	+19 Laps
33	GTD	78	(United States) Forte Racing	(Canada) Devlin DeFrancesco (Canada) Misha Goikhberg (Italy) Loris Spinelli	Lamborghini DGF 5.2 L V10	314	+19 Laps
34	GTD	96	(United States) Turner Motorsport	(United States) Robby Foley (United States) Patrick Gallagher (United States) Jake Walker	BMW M4 GT3	314	+19 Laps
34	GTD	96	(United States) Turner Motorsport	(United States) Robby Foley (United States) Patrick Gallagher (United States) Jake Walker	BMW S58B30T0 3.0 L Turbo I6	314	+19 Laps
35	GTD	70	(United Kingdom) Inception Racing	(United States) Brendan Iribe (United Kingdom) Ollie Millroy (Denmark) Frederik Schandorff	McLaren 720S GT3 Evo	314	+19 Laps
35	GTD	70	(United Kingdom) Inception Racing	(United States) Brendan Iribe (United Kingdom) Ollie Millroy (Denmark) Frederik Schandorff	McLaren M840T 4.0 L Turbo V8	314	+19 Laps
36	GTD	43	(United States) Andretti Motorsports	(United States) Jarett Andretti (Colombia) Gabby Chaves (Canada) Scott Hargrove	Porsche 911 GT3 R (992)	314	+19 Laps
36	GTD	43	(United States) Andretti Motorsports	(United States) Jarett Andretti (Colombia) Gabby Chaves (Canada) Scott Hargrove	Porsche M97/80 4.2 L Flat-6	314	+19 Laps
37	GTD	13	(Canada) AWA	(United Kingdom) Matt Bell (Canada) Orey Fidani (Germany) Lars Kern	Chevrolet Corvette Z06 GT3.R	314	+19 Laps
37	GTD	13	(Canada) AWA	(United Kingdom) Matt Bell (Canada) Orey Fidani (Germany) Lars Kern	Chevrolet LT6 5.5 L V8	314	+19 Laps
38	GTD	44	(United States) Magnus Racing	(United States) Andy Lally (United States) John Potter (United States) Spencer Pumpelly	Aston Martin Vantage AMR GT3 Evo	314	+19 Laps
38	GTD	44	(United States) Magnus Racing	(United States) Andy Lally (United States) John Potter (United States) Spencer Pumpelly	Aston Martin M177 4.0 L Turbo V8	314	+19 Laps
39	GTD	34	(United States) Conquest Racing	(Spain) Albert Costa (United States) Manny Franco (Monaco) Cédric Sbirrazzuoli	Ferrari 296 GT3	314	+19 Laps
39	GTD	34	(United States) Conquest Racing	(Spain) Albert Costa (United States) Manny Franco (Monaco) Cédric Sbirrazzuoli	Ferrari F163 3.0 L Turbo V6	314	+19 Laps
40	GTD	86	(United States) MDK Motorsports	(Austria) Klaus Bachler (Denmark) Anders Fjordbach (China) Kerong Li	Porsche 911 GT3 R (992)	314	+19 Laps
40	GTD	86	(United States) MDK Motorsports	(Austria) Klaus Bachler (Denmark) Anders Fjordbach (China) Kerong Li	Porsche M97/80 4.2 L Flat-6	314	+19 Laps
41	GTD	12	(United States) Vasser Sullivan	(United States) Frankie Montecalvo (United States) Aaron Telitz (Canada) Parker Thompson	Lexus RC F GT3	314	+19 Laps
41	GTD	12	(United States) Vasser Sullivan	(United States) Frankie Montecalvo (United States) Aaron Telitz (Canada) Parker Thompson	Toyota 2UR-GSE 5.0 L V8	314	+19 Laps
42 DNF	GTD Pro	3	(United States) Corvette Racing by Pratt Miller Motorsports	(Spain) Antonio García (Spain) Daniel Juncadella (United Kingdom) Alexander Sims	Chevrolet Corvette Z06 GT3.R	313	Accident
42 DNF	GTD Pro	3	(United States) Corvette Racing by Pratt Miller Motorsports	(Spain) Antonio García (Spain) Daniel Juncadella (United Kingdom) Alexander Sims	Chevrolet LT6 5.5 L V8	313	Accident
43	GTD	023	(United States) Triarsi Competizione	(Italy) Alessio Rovera (United States) Charlie Scardina (United States) Onofrio Triarsi	Ferrari 296 GT3	313	+20 Laps
43	GTD	023	(United States) Triarsi Competizione	(Italy) Alessio Rovera (United States) Charlie Scardina (United States) Onofrio Triarsi	Ferrari F163 3.0 L Turbo V6	313	+20 Laps
44	LMP2	99	(United States) AO Racing	(Australia) Matthew Brabham (France) Paul-Loup Chatin (United States) P.J. Hyett	Oreca 07	313	+20 Laps
44	LMP2	99	(United States) AO Racing	(Australia) Matthew Brabham (France) Paul-Loup Chatin (United States) P.J. Hyett	Gibson GK428 4.2 L V8	313	+20 Laps
45	GTD Pro	4	(United States) Corvette Racing by Pratt Miller Motorsports	(New Zealand) Earl Bamber (Netherlands) Nicky Catsburg (United States) Tommy Milner	Chevrolet Corvette Z06 GT3.R	307	+26 Laps
45	GTD Pro	4	(United States) Corvette Racing by Pratt Miller Motorsports	(New Zealand) Earl Bamber (Netherlands) Nicky Catsburg (United States) Tommy Milner	Chevrolet LT6 5.5 L V8	307	+26 Laps
46	GTD Pro	9	(Canada) Pfaff Motorsports	(Canada) James Hinchcliffe (United Kingdom) Oliver Jarvis (Germany) Marvin Kirchhöfer	McLaren 720S GT3 Evo	293	+40 Laps
46	GTD Pro	9	(Canada) Pfaff Motorsports	(Canada) James Hinchcliffe (United Kingdom) Oliver Jarvis (Germany) Marvin Kirchhöfer	McLaren M840T 4.0 L Turbo V8	293	+40 Laps
47 DNF	GTD	45	(United States) Wayne Taylor Racing with Andretti	(United States) Graham Doyle (Costa Rica) Danny Formal (Canada) Kyle Marcelli	Lamborghini Huracán GT3 Evo 2	292	Electrical
47 DNF	GTD	45	(United States) Wayne Taylor Racing with Andretti	(United States) Graham Doyle (Costa Rica) Danny Formal (Canada) Kyle Marcelli	Lamborghini DGF 5.2 L V10	292	Electrical
48 DNF	GTD	55	(Germany) Proton Competition	(United States) Ryan Hardwick (Italy) Giammarco Levorato (United States) Corey Lewis	Ford Mustang GT3	291	Mechanical
48 DNF	GTD	55	(Germany) Proton Competition	(United States) Ryan Hardwick (Italy) Giammarco Levorato (United States) Corey Lewis	Ford Coyote 5.4 L V8	291	Mechanical
49 DNF	LMP2	8	(United States) Tower Motorsports	(United States) Michael Dinan (Republic of Ireland) Charlie Eastwood (Canada) John Farano	Oreca 07	247	Accident damage
49 DNF	LMP2	8	(United States) Tower Motorsports	(United States) Michael Dinan (Republic of Ireland) Charlie Eastwood (Canada) John Farano	Gibson GK428 4.2 L V8	247	Accident damage
50 DNF	GTD	66	(United States) Gradient Racing	(Colombia) Tatiana Calderón (United Kingdom) Katherine Legge (United States) Sheena Monk	Acura NSX GT3 Evo22	233	Accident
50 DNF	GTD	66	(United States) Gradient Racing	(Colombia) Tatiana Calderón (United Kingdom) Katherine Legge (United States) Sheena Monk	Acura JNC1 3.5 L Turbo V6	233	Accident
51 DNF	GTD	80	(United States) Lone Star Racing	(Angola) Rui Andrade (Australia) Scott Andrews (Turkey) Salih Yoluç	Mercedes-AMG GT3 Evo	218	Suspension damage
51 DNF	GTD	80	(United States) Lone Star Racing	(Angola) Rui Andrade (Australia) Scott Andrews (Turkey) Salih Yoluç	Mercedes-AMG M159 6.2 L V8	218	Suspension damage
52 DNF	GTP	31	(United States) Whelen Cadillac Racing	(United Kingdom) Jack Aitken (United Kingdom) Tom Blomqvist (Brazil) Pipo Derani	Cadillac V-Series.R	210	Accident
52 DNF	GTP	31	(United States) Whelen Cadillac Racing	(United Kingdom) Jack Aitken (United Kingdom) Tom Blomqvist (Brazil) Pipo Derani	Cadillac LMC55R 5.5 L V8	210	Accident
53 DNF	GTD	21	(Italy) AF Corse	(France) François Heriau (United Kingdom) Simon Mann (Spain) Miguel Molina	Ferrari 296 GT3	197	Accident
53 DNF	GTD	21	(Italy) AF Corse	(France) François Heriau (United Kingdom) Simon Mann (Spain) Miguel Molina	Ferrari F163 3.0 L Turbo V6	197	Accident
54 DNF	GTP	85	(United States) JDC-Miller MotorSports	(United Kingdom) Phil Hanson (Netherlands) Tijmen van der Helm (United Kingdom) Richard Westbrook	Porsche 963	178	Driveshaft
54 DNF	GTP	85	(United States) JDC-Miller MotorSports	(United Kingdom) Phil Hanson (Netherlands) Tijmen van der Helm (United Kingdom) Richard Westbrook	Porsche 9RD 4.6 L twin-turbo V8	178	Driveshaft
55 DNF	GTD	83	(Italy) Iron Dames	(Belgium) Sarah Bovy (Switzerland) Rahel Frey (Denmark) Michelle Gatting	Lamborghini Huracán GT3 Evo 2	128	Contact damage
55 DNF	GTD	83	(Italy) Iron Dames	(Belgium) Sarah Bovy (Switzerland) Rahel Frey (Denmark) Michelle Gatting	Lamborghini DGF 5.2 L V10	128	Contact damage
56 DNF	LMP2	88	(Italy) Richard Mille AF Corse	(Denmark) Nicklas Nielsen (Argentina) Luis Pérez Companc (France) Lilou Wadoux	Oreca 07	65	Mechanical
56 DNF	LMP2	88	(Italy) Richard Mille AF Corse	(Denmark) Nicklas Nielsen (Argentina) Luis Pérez Companc (France) Lilou Wadoux	Gibson GK428 4.2 L V8	65	Mechanical
57 DNF	GTD	32	(United States) Korthoff/Preston Motorsports	(Canada) Mikaël Grenier (United States) Kenton Koch (United States) Mike Skeen	Mercedes-AMG GT3 Evo	16	Engine
57 DNF	GTD	32	(United States) Korthoff/Preston Motorsports	(Canada) Mikaël Grenier (United States) Kenton Koch (United States) Mike Skeen	Mercedes-AMG M159 6.2 L V8	16	Engine
58 DNF	GTD	17	(Canada) AWA	(Canada) Anthony Mantella (United States) Thomas Merrill (Argentina) Nicolás Varrone	Chevrolet Corvette Z06 GT3.R	2	Alternator
58 DNF	GTD	17	(Canada) AWA	(Canada) Anthony Mantella (United States) Thomas Merrill (Argentina) Nicolás Varrone	Chevrolet LT6 5.5 L V8	2	Alternator

== Standings after the race ==
GTP Drivers' Championship standings
Pos.	+/–	Driver	Points
1		(United States) Dane Cameron (Australia) Matt Campbell (Brazil) Felipe Nasr	706
2	1	(Switzerland) Louis Delétraz (United States) Colton Herta (United States) Jordan Taylor	706
3	1	(United Kingdom) Jack Aitken (United Kingdom) Tom Blomqvist (Brazil) Pipo Derani	600
4	6	(France) Sébastien Bourdais (New Zealand) Scott Dixon (Netherlands) Renger van der Zande	594
5	1	(United States) Connor De Phillippi (Belgium) Maxime Martin (United Kingdom) Nick Yelloly	570

LMP2 Drivers' Championship standings
Pos.	+/–	Driver	Points
1		(United Kingdom) Ryan Dalziel (United States) Dwight Merriman (United States) Connor Zilisch	741
2	1	(Australia) Josh Burdon (Brazil) Felipe Fraga (United States) Gar Robinson	614
3	1	(Denmark) Malthe Jakobsen	612
4	2	(United States) Colin Braun (United States) George Kurtz (United Kingdom) Toby Sowery	595
5	1	(United States) Nick Boulle (France) Tom Dillmann (Poland) Jakub Śmiechowski	590

GTD Pro Drivers' Championship standings
Pos.	+/–	Driver	Points
1		(United Kingdom) James Calado (Italy) Davide Rigon (Brazil) Daniel Serra	722
2	1	(United States) Bryan Sellers (United States) Madison Snow (United States) Neil Verhagen	624
3	8	(United Kingdom) Ben Barnicoat (United Kingdom) Jack Hawksworth (United States) Kyle Kirkwood	617
4	2	(Denmark) Michael Christensen (Germany) Laurin Heinrich (United Kingdom) Sebastian Priaulx	605
5	1	(Italy) Mirko Bortolotti (South Africa) Jordan Pepper (France) Franck Perera	596

GTD Drivers' Championship standings
Pos.	+/–	Driver	Points
1		(Netherlands) Indy Dontje (Switzerland) Philip Ellis (United States) Russell Ward	725
2	8	(Italy) Antonio Fuoco (Italy) Roberto Lacorte (Italy) Giorgio Sernagiotto	589
3	4	(United States) Adam Adelson (Belgium) Jan Heylen (United States) Elliott Skeer	570
4	1	(Spain) Albert Costa (United States) Manny Franco (Monaco) Cédric Sbirrazzuoli	545
5	3	(France) François Heriau (United Kingdom) Simon Mann (Spain) Miguel Molina	485

- Note: Only the top five positions are included for all sets of standings.

GTP Teams' Championship standings
Pos.	+/–	Team	Points
1		#7 Porsche Penske Motorsport	706
2	1	#40 Wayne Taylor Racing with Andretti	706
3	1	#31 Whelen Cadillac Racing	600
4	6	#01 Cadillac Racing	594
5	1	#25 BMW M Team RLL	570

LMP2 Teams' Championship standings
Pos.	+/–	Team	Points
1		#18 Era Motorsport	741
2	1	#74 Riley	614
3	1	#04 CrowdStrike Racing by APR	595
4		#52 Inter Europol by PR1/Mathiasen Motorsports	590
5	6	#22 United Autosports USA	558

GTD Pro Teams' Championship standings
Pos.	+/–	Team	Points
1		#62 Risi Competizione	722
2	1	#1 Paul Miller Racing	624
3	8	#14 Vasser Sullivan	617
4	2	#77 AO Racing	605
5	1	#19 Iron Lynx	596

GTD Teams' Championship standings
Pos.	+/–	Team	Points
1		#57 Winward Racing	725
2	8	#47 Cetilar Racing	589
3	4	#120 Wright Motorsports	570
4	1	#34 Conquest Racing	545
5	3	#21 AF Corse	485

- Note: Only the top five positions are included for all sets of standings.

GTP Manufacturers' Championship standings
Pos.	+/–	Manufacturer	Points
1	1	(United States) Cadillac	710
2	1	(Germany) Porsche	710
3		(Japan) Acura	710
4		(Germany) BMW	620
5		(Italy) Lamborghini	286

GTD Pro Manufacturers' Championship standings
Pos.	+/–	Manufacturer	Points
1	6	(Japan) Lexus	637
2	1	(Germany) Porsche	625
3	2	(Italy) Lamborghini	596
4	2	(United Kingdom) Aston Martin	594
5	1	(United States) Ford	547

GTD Manufacturers' Championship standings
Pos.	+/–	Manufacturer	Points
1		(Germany) Mercedes-AMG	751
2	1	(Germany) Porsche	634
3	1	(Italy) Lamborghini	616
4		(United Kingdom) McLaren	550
5		(Japan) Lexus	527

- Note: Only the top five positions are included for all sets of standings.

== Notes ==
IMSA SportsCar Championship
Previous race: 24 Hours of Daytona	2024 season	Next race: Grand Prix of Long Beach
