= 2018 Trans-Am Series =

American sports car racing competition

The 2018 Trans-Am Series season was the fiftieth running of the Sports Car Club of America's Trans-Am Series. It began on March 2 at Sebring International Raceway and ran for twelve rounds.

== Schedule ==
=== National Championship ===
Round	Event	Circuit	Location	Date	Classes
1	Sebring 100	(United States) Sebring International Raceway	Sebring, Florida	2–4 March	All
2	Georgia Speedfest	(United States) Road Atlanta	Braselton, Georgia	29–31 March	All
3	South Florida SportsCar Challenge	(United States) Homestead-Miami Speedway road course	Homestead, Florida	13–15 April	All
4	Chevrolet Detroit Grand Prix	(United States) Belle Isle Park	Detroit, Michigan	1–3 June	TA2
5	Brickyard Vintage Racing Invitational	(United States) Indianapolis Motor Speedway road course	Speedway, Indiana	15–17 June	All
6	Keystone Speedfest	(United States) Pittsburgh International Race Complex	Wampum, Pennsylvania	3–5 August	TA/TA3/TA4
7	First Energy Mid-Ohio 100	(United States) Mid-Ohio Sports Car Course	Lexington, Ohio	9–11 August	TBA
8	Ryan Companies Road America Classic	(United States) Road America	Elkhart Lake, Wisconsin	23–25 August	TBA
9	TBA	(United States) Watkins Glen International	Watkins Glen, New York	7–9 September	TBA
10	TBA	(United States) Virginia International Raceway	Alton, Virginia	21 September	TBA
11	TBA	(United States) Circuit of the Americas	Elroy, Texas	1–3 November	TBA
12	TBA	(United States) Daytona International Speedway	Daytona Beach, Florida	9–11 November	TBA

Races are part of the Northern Cup
Races are part of the Southern Cup

=== West Coast Championship ===
Round	Event	Circuit	Location	Date	Classes
1		(United States) Auto Club Speedway sports car course	Fontana, California	April 27–29	All
2		(United States) Sonoma Raceway	Sonoma, California	June 1–3	All
3	Brickyard Vintage Racing Invitational	(United States) Indianapolis Motor Speedway road course	Speedway, Indiana	June 15–17	All
4		(United States) Portland International Raceway	Portland, Oregon	July 27–29	All
5		(United States) Circuit of the Americas	Elroy, Texas	November 1–3	All

Race is combined with Trans-Am National Series.

=== Changes ===
- Homestead and Atlanta have swapped places.
- The rounds at Brainerd International Raceway and New Jersey Motorsports Park have been dropped.
- Pittsburgh is new to the schedule.

== Race results ==
=== National Championship ===
TA, TA3, TA4 competed together at all events except Pittsburgh, where TA ran a dedicated race and a separate race was held for TA3 and TA4, and at Daytona, where all classes competed together. TA2 competed in a dedicated race at all events except Daytona. Overall winners in bold.

Round	Circuit	TA Winning driver	TA2 Winning driver	TA3 Winning driver	TA4 Winning driver
1	Sebring International Raceway	(United States) **Ernie Francis Jr.**	(United States) **Marc Miller**	(United States) Mark Boden	(United States) Andrew Aquilante
2	Road Atlanta	(United States) **Chris Dyson**	(Brazil) **Rafa Matos**	(United States) Randy Kinsland	None entered
3	Homestead-Miami Speedway road course	(United States) **Ernie Francis Jr.**	(Brazil) **Rafa Matos**	(United States) Shane Lewis	(United States) Steven Davison
4	Streets of Belle Isle	TA2 only	R1: (United States) **Tony Buffomante**; R2: (Brazil) **Rafa Matos**	TA2 only	TA2 only
5	Indianapolis Motor Speedway road course	(United States) **Ernie Francis Jr.** (Note: The National and West Coast series raced together at Indianapolis but scored points separately. Francis won overall.)	(United States) Jordan Bupp (Note: The National and West Coast series raced together at Indianapolis but scored points separately. Bupp finished 2nd in the TA2 race and 1st of the National TA2 entries.)	(United States) Tim Kezman (Note: The National and West Coast series raced together at Indianapolis but scored points separately. Kezman finished 1st of the TA3 entries.)	(United States) Warren Dexter (Note: The National and West Coast series raced together at Indianapolis but scored points separately. Dexter finished 1st of the TA4 entries.)
6	Pittsburgh International Race Complex	(United States) **Lawrence Loshak**	Not on TA2 schedule	(United States) **Cindi Lux** (Note: TA3 and TA4 competed in a separate race to TA at Pittsburgh. Lux won overall.)	(United States) Warren Dexter
7	Mid-Ohio Sports Car Course	(United States) **Ernie Francis Jr.**	(Brazil) **Rafa Matos**	(United States) Mark Boden	(United States) Warren Dexter
8	Road America	(United States) **Boris Said**	(United States) **Ty Majeski**	(United States) Jason Daskalos	(United States) Warren Dexter
9	Watkins Glen International	(United States) **Tomy Drissi**	(Brazil) **Rafa Matos**	(United States) Mark Boden	(United States) Warren Dexter
10	Virginia International Raceway	(United States) **Lawrence Loshak**	(United States) **Scott Lagasse Jr.**	(United States) Mark Boden	None entered
11	Circuit of the Americas	(United States) **Ernie Francis Jr.** (Note: The National and West Coast series raced together at COTA but scored points separately. Francis won overall.)	(United States) **Gar Robinson** (Note: The National and West Coast series raced together at COTA but scored points separately. Robinson won the TA2 race overall.)	(United States) Ryan Dexter (Note: The National and West Coast series raced together at COTA but scored points separately. Ryan Dexter finished 1st of the TA3 entries.)	(United States) Warren Dexter (Note: The National and West Coast series raced together at COTA but scored points separately. Warren Dexter finished 1st of the TA4 entries.)
12	Daytona International Speedway road course	(United States) **David Pintaric**	(United States) Tony Buffomante	(United States) Tim Kezman	(United States) Steven Davison

=== West Coast Championship ===
All classes raced together on track, except in the meetings shared with the National Championship. Bold indicates overall winner.

Round	Circuit	TA Winning driver	TA2 Winning driver	TA3 Winning driver	TA4 Winning driver
1	Auto Club Speedway	(United States) Tim Adolphson	(United States) **Thomas Merrill**	(United States) Oli Thordarson	(United States) Dane Jorgenson-Smith
2	Sonoma Raceway	(United States) **Greg Pickett**	(United States) Thomas Merrill	(United States) Oli Thordarson	None entered
3	Indianapolis Motor Speedway road course	(United States) Tomy Drissi (Note: The National and West Coast series raced together at Indianapolis but scored points separately. Drissi finished 3rd of the TA entries and 1st of the West Coast TA entries.)	(United States) **Thomas Merrill** (Note: The National and West Coast series raced together at Indianapolis but scored points separately. Merrill won overall.)	None entered	(United States) Dane Jorgenson-Smith (Note: The National and West Coast series raced together at Indianapolis but scored points separately. Jorgenson-Smith finished 13th overall, 2nd of the TA4 entries and 1st of the West Coast TA4 entries.)
4	Portland International Raceway	(United States) **Greg Pickett**	(United States) Thomas Merrill	(United States) Oli Thordarson	None started
5	Circuit of the Americas	None entered (Note: Tomy Drissi finished 3rd overall, but it appears that he did not score points in the West Coast Championship for this event.)	(United States) Brad McAllister (Note: McAllister finished 8th overall and 1st of the West Coast TA2 entries.)	None entered	None entered

== Entries ==
=== TA ===
Team	Car	No.	Drivers	Rounds
(United States) ACP Motorsports	Cadillac CTS-V	19	(United States) Kerry Hitt	1
(United States) American V8 Road Racing	Dodge Challenger	9	(United States) Jeff Hinkle	1
(United States) Baucom Motorsports	Ford Mustang	86	(United States) John Baucom	1
(Canada) BC Race Cars	Chevrolet Corvette	15	(Canada) Blaise Csaida	1
(United States) Breathless Racing	Ford Mustang	98	(United States) Ernie Francis, Jr.	1
(United States) Bupp Motorsports	Chevrolet Camaro	81	(United States) Kenny Bupp	1
