= Nicky Catsburg =

Dutch racing driver (born 1988)

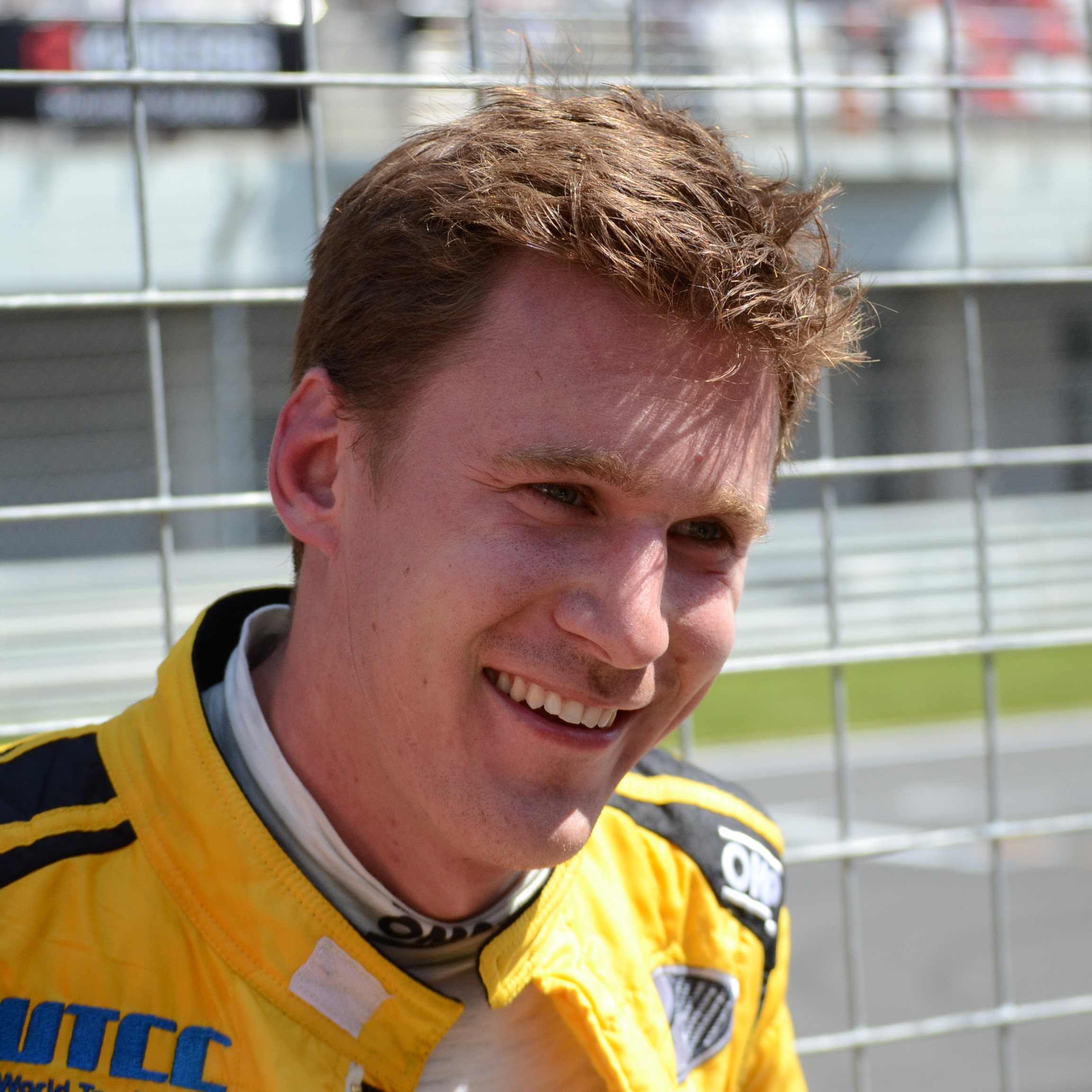
- Catsburg in 2015
- Nationality: (Netherlands) Dutch
- Born: Nick Catsburg; 15 February 1988 (age 38) Amersfoort, Netherlands

FIA World Endurance Championship career
- Debut season: 2018–19
- Current team: Corvette Racing
- Categorisation: FIA Silver (2011); FIA Gold (2012–2019); FIA Platinum (2020–)
- Car number: 33
- Former teams: BMW Team MTEK
- Starts: 22
- Wins: 4
- Podiums: 9
- Best finish: 1st (in LMGTE Am) in 2023

Previous series
- 2009–10 2009–10 2008 2007–08 2006 2005 2004–05: Eurocup Mégane Trophy; Dutch GT4; Eurocup Formula Renault 2.0; Formula Renault 2.0 NEC; Formula Ford Benelux; SEAT Cupra Cup Netherlands; Unipart Endurance Cup

Championship titles
- 2023 2023 2020 2010 2006: FIA World Endurance Championship – LMGTE Am; Asian Le Mans Series – GT; Intercontinental GT Challenge; Eurocup Mégane Trophy; Formula Ford Benelux Division 1

Nick Catsburg (born 15 February 1988 in Amersfoort) is a Dutch professional racing driver, currently competing in the IMSA SportsCar Championship with Corvette Racing by Pratt Miller Motorsports. He was also a factory driver for BMW from 2011 to 2022.

Having started off his career in single-seaters before moving to endurance racing, Catsburg is a two-time Nürburgring 24 Hours winner, with BMW in 2020 and with Ferrari in 2023. He has also won the Spa 24 Hours once overall, as well as the 24 Hours of Le Mans and the 24 Hours of Daytona in class, both with Corvette. He has also gathered success in touring car racing, winning two races in the WTCC and one in its successor, the WTCR.

== Career ==
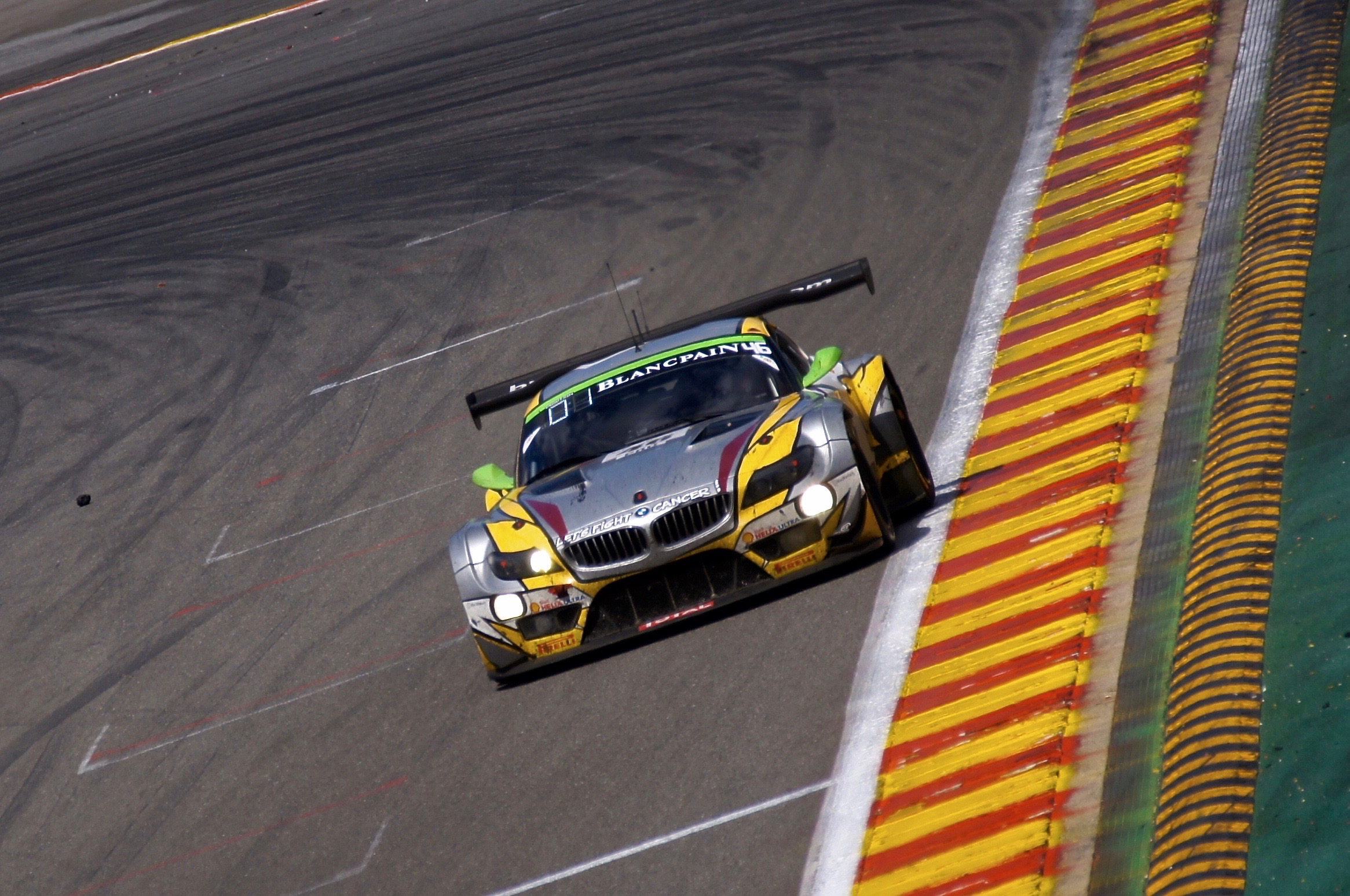
The Marc VDS Racing BMW Z4 GT3 that won the 2015 24 Hours of Spa

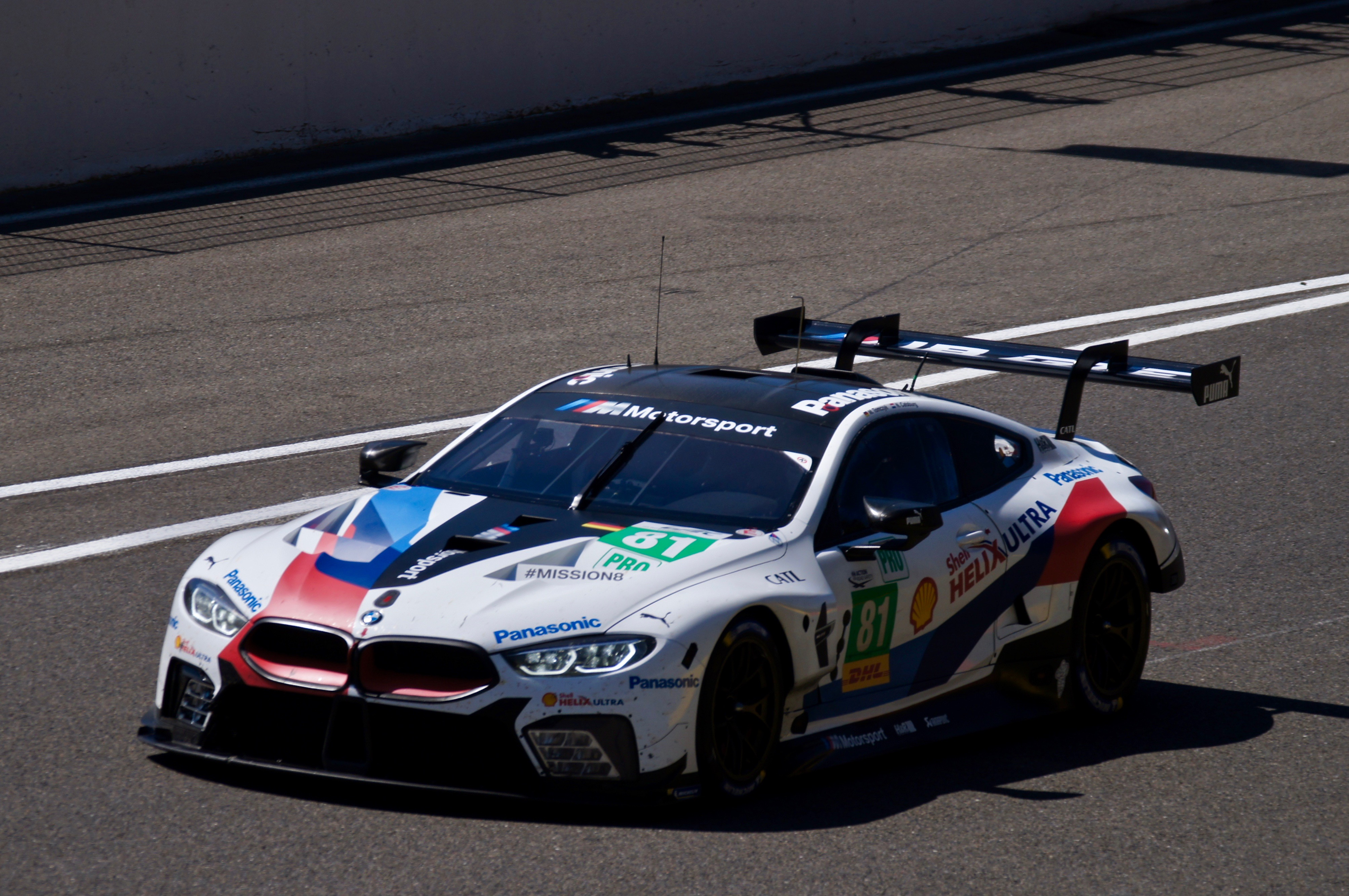
Nick Catsburg driving the new BMW M8 GTE during the 2018 6 Hours of Spa

=== 2016 ===
- 2nd Daytona 24 Hours
- 2nd WTCC Moscow Opening Race
- 1st WTCC Moscow Main Race

=== 2015 ===
Winner Spa 24 Hours with BMW Sports Trophy Team MarcVDS

=== 2014 ===
- Winner VLN3 with BMW Sports Trophy Team MarcVDS
- Winner Paul Ricard Blancpain Endurance Series Pro – Am with TDS Racing Team
- Winner Nurburgring Blancpain Endurance Series Pro – Am with TDS Racing Team
- Winner and p2 Nurburgring GT Open with Selleslagh Racing Team
- Vice Champion Pro – Am team championship Blancpain Endurance Series with TDS Racing Team.
- Participation 24h Nurburgring with BMW Sports Trophy Team MarcVDS
- Participation VLN6 in Dorr Mclaren
- Participation GT Tour – Magny Cours & Paul Ricard
- Participation BRCC championship with Lamborghini Gallardo GT3
- Development on Renault RS.0.1 for Renault Sport Technologies

=== 2013 ===
- Winner Team Championship Blancpain Endurance Series with MarcVDS Racing Team. Sharing with Markus Palttala and Henri Moser in BMW Z4 GT3
- Participation 24h Spa in BMW Z4 GT3
- Winner VLN8 in Z4 GT3 sharing with Maxime Martin
- Podium in ELMS at the Redbull Ring with Algarve Pro Racing Team in LMPC Class.
- Participation ELMS Hungaroring LMPC Class
- Test driver Algarve Pro Racing Team in an LMPC

=== 2012 ===
- 3rd place Dutch GT Championship for Ekris Motorsport, several race wins in the BMW M3 GT4
- Participation 24h Zolder, Blancpain Endurance Series Navarra for MarcVDS Racing Team in a BMW Z4 GT3
- Participation 24h Spa for Team RaceArt in a BMW Z4 GT3

=== 2011 ===
- GT1 Abu Dhabi, Sachsenring, Zolder in Corvette GT1 for Exim Bank Team China (Selleslagh Racing team). Sharing car with Mike Hezemans.
- GT1, rest of the season for Sumopower in Nissan GT1 sharing with Enrique Bernoldi.

FIA GT3 season in BMW Z4 GT3 for DB Motorsport, several podiums.

- Test & development driver for Nissan GT-R GT3.

=== 2010 ===
European Megane Trophy Champion

=== 2009 ===
10th in Megane Trophy, several podiums in Dutch GT4

=== 2008 ===
8th in FR 2.0 NEC, podium in Spa. Podium 24H Barcelona

=== 2007 ===
6th in FR 2.0 NEC. Participation 24H Barcelona

=== 2006 ===
Dutch Formula Ford Champion/ Benelux Formula Ford Champion. Participation 24h Dubai and Barcelona

=== 2005 ===
Vice Champion Seat Cupra Cup

== Racing record ==
=== Career summary ===
Season	Series	Team	Races	Wins	Poles	F/Laps	Podiums	Points	Position
2007	Formula Renault 2.0 NEC	MP Motorsport	16	0	0	0	0	170	6th
2008	Formula Renault 2.0 NEC	MP Motorsport	16	0	0	0	1	163	8th
2008	Formula Renault 2.0 Eurocup	MP Motorsport	2	0	0	0	0	0	41st
2011	FIA GT1 World Championship	Exim Bank Team China	8	0	0	0	1	58	13th
2011	FIA GT1 World Championship	Sumo Power GT	10	0	0	0	0	58	13th
2011	FIA GT3 European Championship	Faster Racing by DB Motorsport	10	0	0	0	2	55	14th
2011	Blancpain Endurance Series – Pro Cup	JR Motorsports	1	0	0	0	0	0	NC
2011	British GT Championship – GT3	JR Motorsports	1	0	0	0	0	0	NC†
2012	Blancpain Endurance Series – Pro Cup	Marc VDS Racing Team	1	0	0	0	0	1	70th
2012	Blancpain Endurance Series – Pro-Am Cup	Race Art	3	0	0	0	0	3	86th
2013	Blancpain Endurance Series – Pro Cup	Marc VDS Racing Team	4	0	0	0	0	31	22nd
2013	FIA GT Series	Marc VDS Racing Team	2	0	0	0	0	0†	NC†
2013	European Le Mans Series – LMPC	Algarve Pro Racing	2	0	1	1	1	16	5th
2014	Blancpain Endurance Series – Pro-Am Cup	TDS Racing	5	2	0	0	2	72	7th
2014	Blancpain Sprint Series	NSC Motorsports	2	0	0	0	1	6	32nd
2014	International GT Open – Super GT	Selleslagh Racing Team	2	1	0	0	2	16	9th
2014	FFSA GT Championship	GSE by DKR Engineering	3	0	0	0	0	1	27th
2014	24 Hours of Nürburgring – SP9	BMW Sports Trophy Team Marc VDS	1	0	0	0	0	N/A	DNF
2015	World Touring Car Championship	Lada Sport Rosneft	15	0	0	0	0	41	12th
2015	Blancpain Endurance Series	BMW Sports Trophy Team Marc VDS	1	1	0	1	1	30	11th
2015	24 Hours of Nürburgring – SP9	BMW Sports Trophy Team Marc VDS	1	0	0	0	0	N/A	4th
2015	Blancpain Sprint Series	Reiter Engineering	12	1	1	1	1	35	13th
2015	ADAC GT Masters	Reiter Engineering	2	0	0	0	1	0†	NC†
2016	World Touring Car Championship	Lada Sport Rosneft	22	1	1	2	5	175	7th
2016	IMSA SportsCar Championship – GTD	Black Swan Racing	4	0	0	0	1	92	17th
2016	Blancpain GT Series Endurance Cup	Rowe Racing	3	0	0	0	0	2	45th
2016	Blancpain GT Series Sprint Cup	Rowe Racing	6	0	0	0	0	0	NC
2016	24 Hours of Nürburgring – SP9	Rowe Racing	1	0	0	0	0	N/A	DNF
2016–17	Asian Le Mans Series – LMP2	Algarve Pro Racing	1	0	1	0	1	16	11th
2017	World Touring Car Championship	Polestar Cyan Racing	20	1	1	3	5	238.5	5th
2017	IMSA SportsCar Championship – GTLM	BMW Team RLL	3	0	0	0	0	64	17th
2017	Blancpain GT Series Endurance Cup	Rowe Racing	1	0	0	0	0	5	32th
2017	24 Hours of Nürburgring – SP9	Rowe Racing	1	0	0	0	1	N/A	**2nd**
2017	ADAC GT Masters	BMW Team Schnitzer	8	0	2	1	2	55	19th
2018	Stock Car Brasil Championship	Cimed Racing	1	0	0	0	0	0	NC
2018	IMSA SportsCar Championship – GTLM	BMW Team RLL	2	0	0	1	0	48	18th
2018	Blancpain GT Series Endurance Cup	Rowe Racing	3	0	0	0	1	27	17th
2018	24 Hours of Nürburgring – SP9	Rowe Racing	1	0	0	0	0	N/A	DNF
2018–19	FIA World Endurance Championship – LMGTE Pro	BMW Team MTEK	8	0	0	0	1	53	14th
2019	World Touring Car Cup	BRC Hyundai N LUKOIL Racing Team	29	0	2	1	0	166	13th
2019	Blancpain GT Series Endurance Cup	Walkenhorst Motorsport	1	0	0	0	0	7	28th
2019	24 Hours of Nürburgring – SP9	Rowe Racing	1	0	0	0	0	N/A	DNF
2020	World Touring Car Cup	Engstler Hyundai N Liqui Moly Racing Team	5	1	0	1	1	53	17th
2020	IMSA SportsCar Championship – GTLM	Corvette Racing	3	0	2	1	1	86	8th
2020	GT World Challenge Europe Endurance Cup	Walkenhorst Motorsport	1	0	0	0	0	0	NC
2020	24 Hours of Nürburgring – SP9	Rowe Racing	1	0	0	0	1	N/A	**1st**
2021	Asian Le Mans Series – GT3	Walkenhorst Motorsport	4	0	0	0	1	16	10th
2021	IMSA SportsCar Championship – GTLM	Corvette Racing	3	1	1	1	1	977	8th
2021	24 Hours of Le Mans – LMGTE Pro	Corvette Racing	1	0	0	0	1	N/A	**2nd**
2021	GT World Challenge Europe Endurance Cup	HubAuto Racing	1	0	0	0	0	0	NC
2021	GT World Challenge Europe Endurance Cup	Walkenhorst Motorsport	2	0	0	0	0	0	NC
2021	24 Hours of Nürburgring – SP9	Rowe Racing	1	0	0	0	0	N/A	DNF
2022	Asian Le Mans Series – GT3	Walkenhorst Motorsport	4	0	0	0	0	8	11th
2022	World Touring Car Cup	BRC Hyundai N Racing team	4	0	0	0	1	0†	NC†
2022	IMSA SportsCar Championship – GTD Pro	Corvette Racing	3	1	0	0	1	941	11th
2022	24 Hours of Le Mans – LMGTE Pro	Corvette Racing	1	0	0	0	0	N/A	DNF
2022	GT World Challenge Europe Endurance Cup	Rowe Racing	4	0	0	0	0	32	14th
2022	24 Hours of Nürburgring – SP9	Rowe Racing	1	0	0	0	0	N/A	DNF
2022	ADAC GT Masters	Schubert Motorsport	12	0	1	0	1	80	18th
2022	eTouring Car World Cup	Hyundai Motorsport N	4	0	0	0	0	188	11th
2023	Asian Le Mans Series – GT3	Walkenhorst Motorsport	4	2	2	0	3	82	**1st**
2023	FIA World Endurance Championship – LMGTE Am	Corvette Racing	7	3	3	0	5	173	**1st**
2023	24 Hours of Nürburgring – SP9	Frikadelli Racing Team	1	0	0	0	1	N/A	**1st**
2023	GT World Challenge Europe Endurance Cup	SunEnergy1 Racing	1	0	0	0	0	0	NC
2024	IMSA SportsCar Championship – GTD Pro	Corvette Racing by Pratt Miller Motorsports	10	0	3	0	2	2674	8th
2024	24 Hours of Le Mans – LMP2 Pro-Am	CrowdStrike Racing by APR	1	0	0	0	0	N/A	DNF
2024	GT World Challenge Europe Endurance Cup	CrowdStrike by Riley	1	0	0	0	0	0	NC
2024–25	Asian Le Mans Series – LMP2	Nielsen Racing	6	0	0	0	1	62	6th
2025	IMSA SportsCar Championship – GTD Pro	Corvette Racing by Pratt Miller Motorsports	10	0	0	0	3	2908	6th
2025	24 Hours of Le Mans – LMP2 Pro-Am	Algarve Pro Racing	1	0	0	0	0	N/A	8th
2025	GT World Challenge Europe Endurance Cup	CrowdStrike by SPS	1	0	0	0	0	0	NC
2025	Suzuka 1000 km	Johor Motorsports JMR	1	0	0	0	1	N/A	**3rd**
2025	GT World Challenge America – Pro-Am	Chouest Povoledo Racing	1	0	0	0	0	0	NC†
2026	IMSA SportsCar Championship – GTD Pro	Corvette Racing by Pratt Miller Motorsports	10	0	0	1	4	2949	**3rd**
2026	FIA World Endurance Championship – LMGT3	TF Sport	8	1	0	0	3	103	**2nd**
2026	Nürburgring Langstrecken-Serie - SP9	Team ABT Sportsline							
2026	24 Hours of Nürburgring - SP9	Schaeffler Team Abt	1	0	0	0	0	N/A	DNF
2026	Intercontinental GT Challenge	Johor Motorsports JMR	2	0	0	0	0	12	24th

^{†} Catsburg was a guest driver, he was ineligible for points.

=== Complete Formula Renault 2.0 NEC results ===
(key) (Races in bold indicate pole position) (Races in italics indicate fastest lap)

Year	Entrant	1	2	3	4	5	6	7	8	9	10	11	12	13	14	15	16	DC	Points
2007	MP Motorsport	ZAN; 1; 6	ZAN; 2; 7	OSC; 1; 11	OSC; 2; 6	ASS; 1; 10	ASS; 2; 6	ZOL; 1; 10	ZOL; 1; 21†	NUR; 1; 15	NUR; 2; 13	OSC; 1; 7	OSC; 2; 21	SPA; 1; 8	SPA; 2; 10	HOC; 1; 4	HOC; 2; 12	6th	170
2008	MP Motorsport	HOC; 1 Ret	HOC; 2; 5	ZAN; 1; 5	ZAN; 2; 18	ALA; 1; 5	ALA; 2; 11	OSC; 1 Ret	OSC; 2; 13	ASS; 1; 4	ASS; 2; 22†	ZOL; 1; 4	ZOL; 2; 10	NÜR; 1; 15	NÜR; 2; 15	SPA; 1; 4	SPA; 2; 3	8th	163

=== Complete Eurocup Formula Renault 2.0 results ===
(key) (Races in bold indicate pole position; races in italics indicate fastest lap)

Year	Entrant	1	2	3	4	5	6	7	8	9	10	11	12	13	14	DC	Points
2008	MP Motorsport	SPA; 1; 34	SPA; 2; 16	SIL; 1	SIL; 2	HUN; 1	HUN; 2	NÜR; 1	NÜR; 2	LMS; 1	LMS; 2	EST; 1	EST; 2	CAT; 1	CAT; 2	41st	0

=== Complete FIA GT1 World Championship results ===
Year	Team	Car	1	2	3	4	5	6	7	8	9	10	11	12	13	14	15	16	17	18	19	20	Pos.	Points
2011	Exim Bank Team China	Chevrolet Corvette C6.R	ABU; QR; 7	ABU; CR; 10	ZOL; QR; 2	ZOL; CR; 5	ALG; QR; 9	ALG; CR; 9	SAC; QR; Ret	SAC; CR; 6	SIL; QR	SIL; CR											13th	58
2011	Sumo Power GT	Nissan GT-R GT1											NAV; QR; Ret	NAV; CR; 12	PRI; QR; 10	PRI; CR; 7	ORD; QR; 5	ORD; CR; Ret	BEI; QR; 10	BEI; CR; 6	SAN; QR; 4	SAN; CR; 4	13th	58

=== Complete GT World Challenge Europe results ===
==== GT World Challenge Europe Endurance Cup ====
Year	Team	Car	Class	1	2	3	4	5	6	7	8	Pos.	Points
2011	JR Motorsports	Nissan GT-R GT3	Pro	MNZ	NAV	SPA; 6H	SPA; 12H	SPA; 24H	MAG	SIL; Ret		NC	0
2012	Race Art	BMW Z4 GT3	Pro-Am	MNZ	SIL; 27	LEC; 15	SPA; 6H; 18	SPA; 12H; Ret	SPA; 24H; Ret	NÜR		51st	3
2012	Marc VDS Racing Team	BMW Z4 GT3	Pro								NAV; 12	NC	0
2013	Marc VDS Racing Team	BMW Z4 GT3	Pro	MNZ; 36	SIL; 5	LEC	SPA; 6H; 1	SPA; 12H; 42	SPA; 24H; Ret	NÜR; 7		10th	31
2014	TDS Racing	BMW Z4 GT3	Pro-Am	MNZ; 21	SIL; 37	LEC; 6	SPA; 6H; 12	SPA; 12H; 9	SPA; 24H; Ret	NÜR; 4		4th	72
2015	BMW Sports Trophy Team Marc VDS	BMW Z4 GT3	Pro	MNZ	SIL	LEC	SPA; 6H; 18	SPA; 12H; 5	SPA; 24H; 1	NÜR		11th	30
2016	Rowe Racing	BMW M6 GT3	Pro	MNZ	SIL; 12	LEC	SPA; 6H; 9	SPA; 12H; 16	SPA; 24H; 41	NÜR; 10		45th	2
2017	Rowe Racing	BMW M6 GT3	Pro	MNZ	SIL	LEC	SPA; 6H; 15	SPA; 12H; 6	SPA; 24H; 10	CAT		32nd	5
2018	Rowe Racing	BMW M6 GT3	Pro	MNZ; Ret	SIL	LEC	SPA; 6H; 7	SPA; 12H; 6	SPA; 24H; 2	CAT; 9		17th	27
2019	Walkenhorst Motorsport	BMW M6 GT3	Pro	MON	SIL	LEC	SPA; 6H; 8	SPA; 12H; 5	SPA; 24H; 11	CAT		28th	7
2020	Walkenhorst Motorsport	BMW M6 GT3	Pro	IMO	NÜR	SPA; 6H; 50	SPA; 12H; 53	SPA; 24H; Ret	LEC			NC	0
2021	HubAuto Racing	Mercedes-AMG GT3 Evo	Pro	MNZ	LEC	SPA; 6H; 12	SPA; 12H; 45	SPA; 24H; 37				NC	0
2021	Walkenhorst Motorsport	BMW M6 GT3	Pro						NÜR; 15	CAT; Ret		NC	0
2022	Rowe Racing	BMW M4 GT3	Pro	IMO; 11	LEC; 11	SPA; 6H; 1	SPA; 12H; 1	SPA; 24H; 6	HOC; 11	CAT		14th	32
2023	SunEnergy1 Racing	Mercedes-AMG GT3 Evo	Pro-Am	MNZ	LEC	SPA; 6H; 53	SPA; 12H; 39	SPA; 24H; 22	NÜR	CAT		10th	37
2024	Crowdstrike by Riley	Mercedes-AMG GT3 Evo	Pro-Am	LEC	SPA; 6H; 44	SPA; 12H; 38	SPA; 24H; 29	NÜR	MNZ	JED		NC	0
2025	Crowdstrike by SPS	Mercedes-AMG GT3 Evo	Pro-Am	LEC	MNZ	SPA; 6H; 59	SPA; 12H; 47	SPA; 24H; 36	NÜR	CAT		NC	0

==== GT World Challenge Europe Sprint Cup ====
Year	Team	Car	Class	1	2	3	4	5	6	7	8	9	10	11	12	13	14	Pos.	Points
2013	Marc VDS Racing Team	BMW Z4 GT3	Pro	NOG; QR	NOG; CR	ZOL; QR	ZOL; CR	ZAN; QR	ZAN; CR	SVK; QR	SVK; CR	NAV; QR	NAV; CR	BAK; QR; 5	BAK; CR; Ret			NC‡	0‡
2014	NSC Motorsports	Lamborghini Gallardo FL2	Pro	NOG; QR	NOG; CR	BRH; QR	BRH; CR	ZAN; QR	ZAN; CR	SVK; QR	SVK; CR	ALG; QR	ALG; CR	ZOL; QR; 2	ZOL; CR; Ret	BAK; QR	BAK; CR	32nd	6
2015	Reiter Engineering	Lamborghini Gallardo LP 560-4 R-EX	Pro	NOG; QR; Ret	NOG; CR; 17	BRH; QR; 7	BRH; CR; 5	ZOL; QR	ZOL; CR	**MOS**; **QR**; 1	MOS; CR; Ret	ALG; QR; 5	ALG; CR; 6	MIS; QR; 10	MIS; CR; 9	ZAN; QR; 12	ZAN; CR; 8	13th	35
2016	Rowe Racing	BMW M6 GT3	Pro	MIS; QR; 10	MIS; CR; 29	BRH; QR	BRH; CR	NÜR; QR	NÜR; CR	HUN; QR; 18	HUN; CR; 15	CAT; QR; 18	CAT; CR; 15					NC	0

‡ As Catsburg was a guest driver, he was ineligible for championship points.

=== Complete World Touring Car Championship results ===
(key) (Races in bold indicate pole position) (Races in italics indicate fastest lap)

Year	Team	Car	1	2	3	4	5	6	7	8	9	10	11	12	13	14	15	16	17	18	19	20	21	22	23	24	DC	Pts
2015	Lada Sport Rosneft	Lada Vesta WTCC	ARG; 1	ARG; 2	MAR; 1	MAR; 2	HUN; 1	HUN; 2	GER; 1	GER; 2	RUS; 1; 11	RUS; 2; 4	SVK; 1 Ret	SVK; 2 Ret	FRA; 1 Ret	FRA; 2; 12	POR; 1; 9	POR; 2; 6	JPN; 1 Ret	JPN; 2 Ret	CHN; 1; 4	CHN; 2 Ret	THA; 1 Ret	THA; 2 DNS	QAT; 1; 9	QAT; 2 Ret	12th	41
2016	Lada Sport Rosneft	Lada Vesta WTCC	FRA; 1; 8	FRA; 2; 5	SVK; 1; 11	SVK; 2; 3	HUN; 1; 3	HUN; 2; 13	MAR; 1 Ret	MAR; 2; 7	GER; 1; 9	GER; 2; 6	RUS; 1; 2	**RUS**; **2**; 1	POR; 1; 3	POR; 2; 7	ARG; 1; 13	ARG; 2; 12	JPN; 1; 7	JPN; 2; 11	CHN; 1; 5	CHN; 2; 4	QAT; 1; 8	QAT; 2; 14			7th	175
2017	Polestar Cyan Racing	Volvo S60 Polestar TC1	MAR; 1; 4	MAR; 2; 4	ITA; 1; 8	ITA; 2; 4	HUN; 1; 5	HUN; 2; 2	GER; 1; 6	GER; 2; 1	POR; 1; 5	POR; 2; 4	ARG; 1; 15	**ARG**; **2**; 16	CHN; 1; 3	CHN; 2; 5‡	JPN; 1; 9	JPN; 2; 2	MAC; 1; 9	MAC; 2; 13	QAT; 1; 8	QAT; 2; 3					5th	238.5

^{‡} Half points awarded as less than 75% of race distance was completed.

=== Complete IMSA SportsCar Championship results ===
(key) (Races in bold indicate pole position; races in italics indicate fastest lap)

Year	Entrant	Class	Make	Engine	1	2	3	4	5	6	7	8	9	10	11	Rank	Points	Ref
2016	Black Swan Racing	GTD	Porsche 911 GT3 R	Porsche 4.0 L Flat-6	DAY; 2	SEB; 13	LGA; 17	DET; WD	WGL; 7	MOS	LIM	ELK	VIR	AUS	PET	17th	92	
2017	BMW Team RLL	GTLM	BMW M6 GTLM	BMW S63 4.4 L Turbo V8	DAY; 11	SEB; 9	LBH	COA	WGL	MOS	LIM	ELK	VIR	LGA	PET; 9	17th	64	
2018	BMW Team RLL	GTLM	BMW M8 GTE	BMW P63 4.0 L Turbo V8	DAY; 7	SEB; 7	LBH	MOH	WGL	MOS	LIM	ELK	VIR	LGA	PET	18th	48	
2020	Corvette Racing	GTLM	Chevrolet Corvette C8.R	Chevrolet LT6.R 5.5 L V8	DAY; 4	DAY	SEB	ELK	VIR	ATL	MDO	CLT	**PET**; 2	LGA	**SEB**; 5	8th	86	
2021	Corvette Racing	GTLM	Chevrolet Corvette C8.R	Chevrolet LT6.R 5.5 L V8	DAY; 1	**SEB**; 4	DET	WGL	WGL	LIM	ELK	LGA	LBH	VIR	PET; 6	8th	977	
2022	Corvette Racing	GTD Pro	Chevrolet Corvette C8.R GTD	Chevrolet LT6.R 5.5 L V8	DAY; 6	SEB; 1	LBH	LGA	WGL	MOS	LIM	ELK	VIR	PET; 5		11th	941	
2024	Corvette Racing by Pratt Miller Motorsports	GTD Pro	Chevrolet Corvette Z06 GT3.R	Chevrolet LT6.R 5.5 L V8	DAY; 8	SEB; 11	**LGA**; 3	DET; 9	WGL; 7	MOS; 2	**ELK**; 6	VIR; 8	**IMS**; 11	PET; 12		8th	2674	
2025	Corvette Racing by Pratt Miller Motorsports	GTD Pro	Chevrolet Corvette Z06 GT3.R	Chevrolet LT6.R 5.5 L V8	DAY; 7	SEB; 9	LGA; 6	DET; 6	WGL; 4	MOS; 2	ELK; 10	VIR; 3	IMS; 6	PET; 2		6th	2908	
2026	Corvette Racing by Pratt Miller Motorsports	GTD Pro	Chevrolet Corvette Z06 GT3.R	Chevrolet LT6.R 5.5 L V8	DAY; 4	SEB; 3	LGA; 2	DET; 7	WGL; 8	MOS; 4	ELK; 3	VIR; 6	IMS; 2	PET; 12		3rd	2949	

=== Complete Asian Le Mans Series results ===
(key) (Races in bold indicate pole position) (Races in italics indicate fastest lap)

Year	Team	Class	Car	Engine	1	2	3	4	5	6	Pos.	Points
2016–17	Algarve Pro Racing	LMP2	Ligier JS P2	Nissan VK45DE 4.5 L V8	**ZHU**; 3	FUJ	CHA	SEP			11th	16
2021	Walkenhorst Motorsport	GT	BMW M6 GT3	BMW S63 4.4 L Turbo V8	DUB; 1; 3	DUB; 2; 8	ABU; 1; 14	ABU; 2; 11			10th	16
2022	Walkenhorst Motorsport	GT	BMW M4 GT3	BMW P58 3.0 L Turbo L6	DUB; 1; 10	DUB; 2; 7	ABU; 1; 11	ABU; 2; 12			11th	8
2023	Walkenhorst Motorsport	GT	BMW M4 GT3	BMW P58 3.0 L Turbo L6	**DUB**; **1**; 1	**DUB**; **2**; 1	ABU; 1; 4	ABU; 2; 2			1st	82
2024–25	Nielsen Racing	LMP2	Oreca 07	Gibson GK428 4.2 L V8	SEP; 1; 5	SEP; 2; 5	DUB; 1; 7	DUB; 2; 7	ABU; 1; 4	ABU; 2; 2	6th	62

=== Complete FIA World Endurance Championship results ===
(key) (Races in bold indicate pole position; races in italics indicate fastest lap)

Year	Entrant	Class	Chassis	Engine	1	2	3	4	5	6	7	8	Rank	Points
2018–19	BMW Team MTEK	LMGTE Pro	BMW M8 GTE	BMW P63 4.0 L Turbo V8	SPA; 8	LMS; 9	SIL; 5	FUJ; 7	SHA; 8	SEB; 2	SPA; 9	LMS; 15	14th	53
2023	Corvette Racing	LMGTE Am	Chevrolet Corvette C8.R	Chevrolet LT6.R 5.5 L V8	SEB; 1	**ALG**; 1	SPA; 2	**LMS**; 1	MNZ; 4	**FUJ**; 2	BHR; 7		1st	173
2026	TF Sport	LMGT3	Chevrolet Corvette Z06 GT3.R	Chevrolet LT6.R 5.5 L V8	IMO; 2	SPA; 8	LMS; 1	SÃO	COA; 12	FUJ; 5	CAT; 7	MNZ; 3	2nd	103

=== Complete 24 Hours of Le Mans results ===
Year	Team	Co-Drivers	Car	Class	Laps	Pos.	Class Pos.
2018	(Germany) BMW Team MTEK	(Germany) Martin Tomczyk (Austria) Philipp Eng	BMW M8 GTE	GTE; Pro	332	33rd	11th
2019	(Germany) BMW Team MTEK	(Germany) Martin Tomczyk (Austria) Philipp Eng	BMW M8 GTE	GTE; Pro	309	47th	13th
2021	(United States) Corvette Racing	(Spain) Antonio García (United States) Jordan Taylor	Chevrolet Corvette C8.R	GTE; Pro	345	21st	**2nd**
2022	(United States) Corvette Racing	(Spain) Antonio García (United States) Jordan Taylor	Chevrolet Corvette C8.R	GTE; Pro	214	DNF	DNF
2023	(United States) Corvette Racing	(Argentina) Nicolás Varrone (United States) Ben Keating	Chevrolet Corvette C8.R	GTE; Am	313	26th	**1st**
2024	(Portugal) CrowdStrike Racing by APR	(United States) Colin Braun (United States) George Kurtz	Oreca 07-Gibson	LMP2	149	DNF	DNF
2024	(Portugal) CrowdStrike Racing by APR	(United States) Colin Braun (United States) George Kurtz	Oreca 07-Gibson	LMP2 Pro-Am	149	DNF	DNF
2025	(Portugal) Algarve Pro Racing	(United States) George Kurtz (United Kingdom) Alex Quinn	Oreca 07-Gibson	LMP2	362	30th	13th
2025	(Portugal) Algarve Pro Racing	(United States) George Kurtz (United Kingdom) Alex Quinn	Oreca 07-Gibson	LMP2 Pro-Am	362	30th	8th
2026	(United Kingdom) TF Sport	(United Kingdom) Jonny Edgar (United States) Ben Keating	Chevrolet Corvette Z06 GT3.R	LMGT3	336	33rd	**1st**

=== Complete World Touring Car Cup results ===
(key) (Races in bold indicate pole position) (Races in italics indicate fastest lap)

Year	Team	Car	1	2	3	4	5	6	7	8	9	10	11	12	13	14	15	16	17	18	19	20	21	22	23	24	25	26	27	28	29	30	DC	Points
2019	BRC Hyundai N LUKOIL Racing Team	Hyundai i30 N TCR	MAR; 1; 10	MAR; 2 Ret	MAR; 3 DNS	HUN; 1; 23	HUN; 2; 10	HUN; 3; 9	**SVK**; **1**; 7	SVK; 2; 4	**SVK**; **3**; 12	NED; 1; 10	NED; 2; 4	NED; 3; 11	GER; 1; 9	GER; 2 DSQ	GER; 3; 8	POR; 1; 5	POR; 2; 5	POR; 3 Ret	CHN; 1; 5	CHN; 2; 15	CHN; 3 Ret	JPN; 1; 23	JPN; 2; 18	JPN; 3; 14	MAC; 1; 10	MAC; 2; 12	MAC; 3; 5	MAL; 1; 9	MAL; 2 Ret	MAL; 3 DSQ	13th	166
2020	Engstler Hyundai N Liqui Moly Racing Team	Hyundai i30 N TCR	BEL; 1; 14	BEL; 2; 9	GER; 1 DNP	GER; 2 DNP	SVK; 1; 17	SVK; 2; 5	SVK; 3; 1	HUN; 1	HUN; 2	HUN; 3	ESP; 1	ESP; 2	ESP; 3	ARA; 1	ARA; 2	ARA; 3															17th	53
2022	BRC Hyundai N Racing team	Hyundai Elantra N TCR	FRA; 1	FRA; 2	GER; 1	GER; 2	HUN; 1	HUN; 2	ESP; 1	ESP; 2	POR; 1	POR; 2	ITA; 1	ITA; 2	ALS; 1	ALS; 2	BHR; 1; 5	BHR; 2; 3	SAU; 1; 7	SAU; 2 Ret													NC‡	0‡

^{‡} As Catsburg was a Wildcard entry, he was ineligible to score points.

Sporting positions
Preceded by Mike Verschuur	Eurocup Mégane Trophy; Champion; 2010	Succeeded by Stefano Comini
Preceded by Dennis Olsen	Intercontinental GT Challenge; Champion; 2020; With: Augusto Farfus	Succeeded by Côme Ledogar; Alessandro Pier Guidi
Preceded by Ben Barnicoat; Brendan Iribe; Ollie Millroy	Asian Le Mans Series; GT Champion; 2023; With: Chandler Hull & Thomas Merrill	Succeeded by Klaus Bachler; Alex Malykhin; Joel Sturm
Preceded by Ben Keating; Marco Sørensen	FIA Endurance Trophy for LMGTE Am Drivers; 2023; With: Ben Keating & Nicolás Varrone	Succeeded by Klaus Bachler; Alex Malykhin; Joel Sturm (LMGT3)
