= 2025 6 Hours of Spa-Francorchamps =

Sports car endurance race

(Belgium) 2025 TotalEnergies 6 Hours of Spa-Francorchamps
Event information
- Round 3 of 8 in the 2025 FIA World Endurance Championship
- Date: 10 May 2025
- Location: Stavelot
- Venue: Circuit de Spa-Francorchamps
- Duration: 6 hours

Results
- Laps completed: 150
- Distance (km): 1050.478
- Distance (miles): 652.737
- Hypercar

Pole position
- Time: 1:59.617
- Team: (Italy) Ferrari AF Corse
- Drivers: (Italy) Antonio Fuoco

Winners
- Team: (Italy) Ferrari AF Corse
- Drivers: (United Kingdom) James Calado (Italy) Antonio Giovinazzi (Italy) Alessandro Pier Guidi
- LMGT3

Winners
- Team: (Italy) Vista AF Corse
- Drivers: (France) François Heriau (United States) Simon Mann (Italy) Alessio Rovera

The 2025 6 Hours of Spa-Francorchamps (formally known as the 2025 TotalEnergies 6 Hours of Spa-Francorchamps) was an endurance sportscar racing event, held between 8 and 10 May 2025 at Circuit de Spa-Francorchamps in Stavelot, Belgium. It was the third of eight rounds of the 2025 FIA World Endurance Championship, the 59th running of the event, and the 14th running of the event as part of the World Endurance Championship.

== Entry list ==
The provisional entry list was published on 25 April 2025 and consists of 36 entries across 2 categories – 18 in both Hypercar and LMGT3. In the Hypercar category, Nico Müller and Pascal Wehrlein joined the No. 5 and No. 6 Porsches, respectively, to prepare for their participation in the 24 Hours of Le Mans. Furthermore, Dries Vanthoor and Sheldon van der Linde were absent from the No. 15 and No. 20 BMWs, respectively, due to driving duties at IMSA's Laguna Seca round. In the LMGT3 category, Brenton Grove and Stephen Grove replaced Matteo Cressoni and Claudio Schiavoni in the No. 60 Iron Lynx Mercedes, with Schiavoni suffering from an injury. Martin Berry is set to replace Christian Ried behind the wheel of the No. 61 Mercedes, with Ried stepping away from driving duties. Finally, Yuichi Nakayama replaced Ben Barnicoat in the No. 78 Akkodis ASP Team Lexus, with Barnicoat still suffering from a hand injury.

== Schedule ==
Date	Time (local: CEST)	Event
Thursday, 8 May	11:30	Free Practice 1
Thursday, 8 May	16:30	Free Practice 2
Friday, 9 May	11:00	Free Practice 3
Friday, 9 May	14:40	Qualifying – LMGT3
Friday, 9 May	15:03	Hyperpole – LMGT3
Friday, 9 May	15:25	Qualifying – Hypercar
Friday, 9 May	15:48	Hyperpole – Hypercar
Saturday, 10 May	14:00	Race

== Practice ==
Three practice sessions are scheduled to be held before the event: two on Thursday and one on Friday. The session on Thursday morning ran for 90 minutes, the session on Thursday afternoon was scheduled to run for 90 minutes but was extended to 2 hours due to multiple crashes, and the session on Friday is scheduled to be run for 60 minutes.

=== Practice 1 ===
The first practice session started at 11:30 CEST on Thursday. Antonio Fuoco topped the session in the No. 50 Ferrari AF Corse entry, with a lap time of 2:02.835. He was 0.222 seconds quicker than second-placed Robert Kubica in the No. 83 Ferrari. Mick Schumacher was third-quickest in the No. 36 Alpine Endurance Team entry, 0.259 seconds behind Fuoco. Finn Gehrsitz topped the LMGT3 class in the No. 78 Akkodis ASP Team entry, with a lap time of 2:18.432. He was 0.096 seconds quicker than Alessio Rovera in the No. 21 Vista AF Corse entry in second, with José María López in the No. 87 Lexus rounding out the top three.

Class	No.	Entrant	Driver	Time
Hypercar	50	(Italy) Ferrari AF Corse	(Italy) Antonio Fuoco	2:02.835
LMGT3	78	(France) Akkodis ASP Team	(Germany) Finn Gehrsitz	2:18.432

- Note: Only the fastest car in each class is shown.

=== Practice 2 ===
The second practice session started at 16:30 CEST on Thursday, with Kévin Estre topping the session in the No. 6 Porsche Penske Motorsport entry. He lapped the circuit in 2 minutes, 1.475 seconds. Fuoco was second-fastest in the No. 50 Ferrari, 0.091 seconds behind Estre. Robin Frijns rounded out the top three in the No. 20 BMW M Team WRT entry, 0.310 seconds slower. Zacharie Robichon topped the session in the LMGT3 category in the No. 27 Heart of Racing Team entry, with a fastest lap of 2:18.326. He was 0.052 seconds quicker than Clemens Schmid in the No. 87 Lexus, with Davide Rigon rounding out the top three in the No. 54 Ferrari, 0.555 seconds behind Robichon. The session saw three red flag stoppages. The first stoppage was after a crash from the No. 51 Ferrari at Eau Rouge. The second stoppage was after a crash from the No. 60 Iron Lynx Mercedes, again at Eau Rouge. This saw the session extended from 90 minutes to 2 hours. The third and final red flag stoppage was for the No. 007 Aston Martin, with Tom Gamble crashing at Pouhon.

Class	No.	Entrant	Driver	Time
Hypercar	6	(Germany) Porsche Penske Motorsport	(France) Kévin Estre	2:01.475
LMGT3	27	(United States) Heart of Racing Team	(Canada) Zacharie Robichon	2:18.326

- Note: Only the fastest car in each class is shown.

=== Practice 3 ===
The third and final practice session started at 11:00 CEST on Friday. Fuoco topped the session in the No. 50 Ferrari, with a lap time of 2:00.596. He was 0.197 seconds quicker than second-placed Earl Bamber in the No. 38 Cadillac Hertz Team Jota entry, with Alex Lynn in the No. 12 Cadillac in third, 0.227 seconds behind Fuoco. The LMGT3 class was topped by Simon Mann in the No. 21 Ferrari, with a fastest lap of 2:17.831. He was 0.350 seconds quicker than Giammarco Levorato, who finished second in the No. 88 Proton Competition Ford. Schmid rounded out the top three in the No. 87 Lexus, a further 0.495 seconds behind.

Class	No.	Entrant	Driver	Time
Hypercar	50	(Italy) Ferrari AF Corse	(Italy) Antonio Fuoco	2:00.596
LMGT3	21	(Italy) Vista AF Corse	(United States) Simon Mann	2:17.831

- Note: Only the fastest car in each class is shown.

== Qualifying ==
Qualifying started at 14:40 CEST on Friday, with one fifteen-minute qualifying session and one twelve-minute hyperpole session per class, resulting in two qualifying and two hyperpole sessions in total. Antonio Fuoco claimed pole position in the No. 50 Ferrari, setting a new unofficial Hypercar lap record, surpassing the previous best of 2:00.747 set by Kamui Kobayashi in 2021.

=== Qualifying results ===
Pole position winners in each class are marked in bold.

Pos	Class	No.	Entrant	Qualifying	Hyperpole	Grid
1	**Hypercar**	**50**	**(Italy) Ferrari AF Corse**	**2:00.108**	**1:59.617**	1
2	Hypercar	83	(Italy) AF Corse	2:00.539	1:59.964	2
3	Hypercar	51	(Italy) Ferrari AF Corse	2:00.576	2:00.201	3
4	Hypercar	94	(France) Peugeot TotalEnergies	2:01.387	2:00.218	4
5	Hypercar	12	(United States) Cadillac Hertz Team Jota	2:01.073	2:00.246	5
6	Hypercar	36	(France) Alpine Endurance Team	2:00.965	2:00.368	6
7	Hypercar	93	(France) Peugeot TotalEnergies	2:00.448	2:00.440	7
8	Hypercar	20	(Germany) BMW M Team WRT	2:01.162	2:00.456	8
9	Hypercar	35	(France) Alpine Endurance Team	2:01.220	2:00.763	9
10	Hypercar	38	(United States) Cadillac Hertz Team Jota	2:01.326	2:00.887	10
11	Hypercar	15	(Germany) BMW M Team WRT	2:01.410		11
12	Hypercar	6	(Germany) Porsche Penske Motorsport	2:01.512		12
13	Hypercar	5	(Germany) Porsche Penske Motorsport	2:01.588		13
14	Hypercar	99	(Germany) Proton Competition	2:01.837		14
15	Hypercar	8	(Japan) Toyota Gazoo Racing	2:01.908		15
16	Hypercar	7	(Japan) Toyota Gazoo Racing	2:01.911		16
17	Hypercar	007	(United Kingdom) Aston Martin THOR Team	2:02.282		17
18	Hypercar	009	(United Kingdom) Aston Martin THOR Team	2:02.403		18
19	**LMGT3**	**78**	**(France) Akkodis ASP Team**	**2:19.497**	**2:17.732**	19
20	LMGT3	10	(France) Racing Spirit of Léman	2:19.736	2:18.008	20
21	LMGT3	77	(Germany) Proton Competition	2:19.757	2:18.016	21
22	LMGT3	88	(Germany) Proton Competition	2:19.390	2:18.229	22
23	LMGT3	54	(Italy) Vista AF Corse	2:19.753	2:18.288	23
24	LMGT3	27	(United States) Heart of Racing Team	2:19.652	2:18.314	24
25	LMGT3	21	(Italy) Vista AF Corse	2:19.223	2:18.456	25
26	LMGT3	92	(Germany) Manthey 1st Phorm	2:19.265	2:18.917	26
27	LMGT3	46	(Belgium) Team WRT	2:19.733	2:19.753	27
28	LMGT3	87	(France) Akkodis ASP Team	2:19.276	No time	28
29	LMGT3	81	(United Kingdom) TF Sport	2:20.215		29
30	LMGT3	31	(Belgium) The Bend Team WRT	2:20.252		30
31	LMGT3	85	(Italy) Iron Dames	2:20.320		31
32	LMGT3	95	(United Kingdom) United Autosports	2:20.482		32
33	LMGT3	61	(Italy) Iron Lynx	2:20.539		33
34	LMGT3	59	(United Kingdom) United Autosports	2:20.857		34
35	LMGT3	33	(United Kingdom) TF Sport	2:21.284		35
36	LMGT3	60	(Italy) Iron Lynx	2:25.211		36

== Race ==
The race started at 14:00 CEST on Saturday, and ran for six hours.

=== Race results ===
The minimum number of laps for classification (70% of overall winning car's distance) was 105 laps. Class winners are in bold and ‡.

Pos	Class	No	Team	Drivers	Chassis	Tyre	Laps	Time/Retired
Pos	Class	No	Team	Drivers	Engine	Tyre	Laps	Time/Retired
1	**Hypercar**	**51**	**(Italy) Ferrari AF Corse**	**(United Kingdom) James Calado (Italy) Antonio Giovinazzi (Italy) Alessandro Pier Guidi**	**Ferrari 499P**	MI	**150**	**6:01:07.299‡**
1	**Hypercar**	**51**	**(Italy) Ferrari AF Corse**	**(United Kingdom) James Calado (Italy) Antonio Giovinazzi (Italy) Alessandro Pier Guidi**	**Ferrari F163 3.0 L Turbo V6**	MI	**150**	**6:01:07.299‡**
2	Hypercar	50	(Italy) Ferrari AF Corse	(Italy) Antonio Fuoco (Spain) Miguel Molina (Denmark) Nicklas Nielsen	Ferrari 499P	MI	150	+4.229
2	Hypercar	50	(Italy) Ferrari AF Corse	(Italy) Antonio Fuoco (Spain) Miguel Molina (Denmark) Nicklas Nielsen	Ferrari F163 3.0 L Turbo V6	MI	150	+4.229
3	Hypercar	36	(France) Alpine Endurance Team	(France) Jules Gounon (France) Frédéric Makowiecki (Germany) Mick Schumacher	Alpine A424	MI	150	+5.148
3	Hypercar	36	(France) Alpine Endurance Team	(France) Jules Gounon (France) Frédéric Makowiecki (Germany) Mick Schumacher	Alpine V634 3.4 L Turbo V6	MI	150	+5.148
4	Hypercar	8	(Japan) Toyota Gazoo Racing	(Switzerland) Sébastien Buemi (New Zealand) Brendon Hartley (Japan) Ryō Hirakawa	Toyota GR010 Hybrid	MI	150	+32.760
4	Hypercar	8	(Japan) Toyota Gazoo Racing	(Switzerland) Sébastien Buemi (New Zealand) Brendon Hartley (Japan) Ryō Hirakawa	Toyota H8909 3.5 L Turbo V6	MI	150	+32.760
5	Hypercar	12	(United States) Cadillac Hertz Team Jota	(United Kingdom) Alex Lynn (France) Norman Nato (United Kingdom) Will Stevens	Cadillac V-Series.R	MI	150	+35.966
5	Hypercar	12	(United States) Cadillac Hertz Team Jota	(United Kingdom) Alex Lynn (France) Norman Nato (United Kingdom) Will Stevens	Cadillac LMC55R 5.5 L V8	MI	150	+35.966
6	Hypercar	38	(United States) Cadillac Hertz Team Jota	(New Zealand) Earl Bamber (France) Sébastien Bourdais (United Kingdom) Jenson Button	Cadillac V-Series.R	MI	150	+45.357
6	Hypercar	38	(United States) Cadillac Hertz Team Jota	(New Zealand) Earl Bamber (France) Sébastien Bourdais (United Kingdom) Jenson Button	Cadillac LMC55R 5.5 L V8	MI	150	+45.357
7	Hypercar	7	(Japan) Toyota Gazoo Racing	(United Kingdom) Mike Conway (Japan) Kamui Kobayashi (Netherlands) Nyck de Vries	Toyota GR010 Hybrid	MI	150	+46.022
7	Hypercar	7	(Japan) Toyota Gazoo Racing	(United Kingdom) Mike Conway (Japan) Kamui Kobayashi (Netherlands) Nyck de Vries	Toyota H8909 3.5 L Turbo V6	MI	150	+46.022
8	Hypercar	35	(France) Alpine Endurance Team	(France) Paul-Loup Chatin (Austria) Ferdinand Habsburg (France) Charles Milesi	Alpine A424	MI	150	+52.011
8	Hypercar	35	(France) Alpine Endurance Team	(France) Paul-Loup Chatin (Austria) Ferdinand Habsburg (France) Charles Milesi	Alpine V634 3.4 L Turbo V6	MI	150	+52.011
9	Hypercar	6	(Germany) Porsche Penske Motorsport	(France) Kévin Estre (Belgium) Laurens Vanthoor (Germany) Pascal Wehrlein	Porsche 963	MI	150	+1:01.871
9	Hypercar	6	(Germany) Porsche Penske Motorsport	(France) Kévin Estre (Belgium) Laurens Vanthoor (Germany) Pascal Wehrlein	Porsche 9RD 4.6 L Turbo V8	MI	150	+1:01.871
10	Hypercar	15	(Germany) BMW M Team WRT	(Denmark) Kevin Magnussen (Switzerland) Raffaele Marciello	BMW M Hybrid V8	MI	150	+1:17.326
10	Hypercar	15	(Germany) BMW M Team WRT	(Denmark) Kevin Magnussen (Switzerland) Raffaele Marciello	BMW P66/3 4.0 L Turbo V8	MI	150	+1:17.326
11	Hypercar	93	(France) Peugeot TotalEnergies	(Denmark) Mikkel Jensen (United Kingdom) Paul di Resta (France) Jean-Éric Vergne	Peugeot 9X8	MI	150	+1:17.976
11	Hypercar	93	(France) Peugeot TotalEnergies	(Denmark) Mikkel Jensen (United Kingdom) Paul di Resta (France) Jean-Éric Vergne	Peugeot X6H 2.6 L Turbo V6	MI	150	+1:17.976
12	Hypercar	5	(Germany) Porsche Penske Motorsport	(France) Julien Andlauer (Denmark) Michael Christensen (Switzerland) Nico Müller	Porsche 963	MI	150	+1:27.554
12	Hypercar	5	(Germany) Porsche Penske Motorsport	(France) Julien Andlauer (Denmark) Michael Christensen (Switzerland) Nico Müller	Porsche 9RD 4.6 L Turbo V8	MI	150	+1:27.554
13	Hypercar	007	(United Kingdom) Aston Martin THOR Team	(United Kingdom) Tom Gamble (United Kingdom) Harry Tincknell	Aston Martin Valkyrie	MI	150	+1:48.439
13	Hypercar	007	(United Kingdom) Aston Martin THOR Team	(United Kingdom) Tom Gamble (United Kingdom) Harry Tincknell	Aston Martin RA 6.5 L V12	MI	150	+1:48.439
14	Hypercar	009	(United Kingdom) Aston Martin THOR Team	(Spain) Alex Riberas (Denmark) Marco Sørensen	Aston Martin Valkyrie	MI	149	+1 Lap
14	Hypercar	009	(United Kingdom) Aston Martin THOR Team	(Spain) Alex Riberas (Denmark) Marco Sørensen	Aston Martin RA 6.5 L V12	MI	149	+1 Lap
15	**LMGT3**	**21**	**(Italy) Vista AF Corse**	**(France) François Heriau (United States) Simon Mann (Italy) Alessio Rovera**	**Ferrari 296 GT3**	G	**137**	**+13 Laps‡**
15	**LMGT3**	**21**	**(Italy) Vista AF Corse**	**(France) François Heriau (United States) Simon Mann (Italy) Alessio Rovera**	**Ferrari F163CE 3.0 L Turbo V6**	G	**137**	**+13 Laps‡**
16	LMGT3	88	(Germany) Proton Competition	(Italy) Stefano Gattuso (Italy) Giammarco Levorato (Norway) Dennis Olsen	Ford Mustang GT3	G	137	+13 Laps
16	LMGT3	88	(Germany) Proton Competition	(Italy) Stefano Gattuso (Italy) Giammarco Levorato (Norway) Dennis Olsen	Ford Coyote 5.4 L V8	G	137	+13 Laps
17	LMGT3	54	(Italy) Vista AF Corse	(Italy) Francesco Castellacci (Switzerland) Thomas Flohr (Italy) Davide Rigon	Ferrari 296 GT3	G	137	+13 Laps
17	LMGT3	54	(Italy) Vista AF Corse	(Italy) Francesco Castellacci (Switzerland) Thomas Flohr (Italy) Davide Rigon	Ferrari F163CE 3.0 L Turbo V6	G	137	+13 Laps
18	LMGT3	77	(Germany) Proton Competition	(United Kingdom) Ben Barker (Portugal) Bernardo Sousa (United Kingdom) Ben Tuck	Ford Mustang GT3	G	137	+13 Laps
18	LMGT3	77	(Germany) Proton Competition	(United Kingdom) Ben Barker (Portugal) Bernardo Sousa (United Kingdom) Ben Tuck	Ford Coyote 5.4 L V8	G	137	+13 Laps
19	LMGT3	27	(United States) Heart of Racing Team	(Italy) Mattia Drudi (United Kingdom) Ian James (Canada) Zacharie Robichon	Aston Martin Vantage AMR GT3 Evo	G	136	+14 Laps
19	LMGT3	27	(United States) Heart of Racing Team	(Italy) Mattia Drudi (United Kingdom) Ian James (Canada) Zacharie Robichon	Aston Martin M177 4.0 L Turbo V8	G	136	+14 Laps
20	LMGT3	10	(France) Racing Spirit of Léman	(Brazil) Eduardo Barrichello (United States) Derek DeBoer (France) Valentin Hasse-Clot	Aston Martin Vantage AMR GT3 Evo	G	136	+14 Laps
20	LMGT3	10	(France) Racing Spirit of Léman	(Brazil) Eduardo Barrichello (United States) Derek DeBoer (France) Valentin Hasse-Clot	Aston Martin M177 4.0 L Turbo V8	G	136	+14 Laps
21	LMGT3	92	(Germany) Manthey 1st Phorm	(United States) Ryan Hardwick (Austria) Richard Lietz (Italy) Riccardo Pera	Porsche 911 GT3 R (992)	G	136	+14 Laps
21	LMGT3	92	(Germany) Manthey 1st Phorm	(United States) Ryan Hardwick (Austria) Richard Lietz (Italy) Riccardo Pera	Porsche M97/80 4.2 L Flat-6	G	136	+14 Laps
22	LMGT3	78	(France) Akkodis ASP Team	(Germany) Finn Gehrsitz (Japan) Yuichi Nakayama (France) Arnold Robin	Lexus RC F GT3	G	136	+14 Laps
22	LMGT3	78	(France) Akkodis ASP Team	(Germany) Finn Gehrsitz (Japan) Yuichi Nakayama (France) Arnold Robin	Lexus 2UR-GSE 5.4 L V8	G	136	+14 Laps
23	LMGT3	46	(Belgium) Team WRT	(Oman) Ahmad Al Harthy (Italy) Valentino Rossi (South Africa) Kelvin van der Linde	BMW M4 GT3	G	136	+14 Laps
23	LMGT3	46	(Belgium) Team WRT	(Oman) Ahmad Al Harthy (Italy) Valentino Rossi (South Africa) Kelvin van der Linde	BMW P58 3.0 L Turbo I6	G	136	+14 Laps
24	LMGT3	85	(Italy) Iron Dames	(Switzerland) Rahel Frey (Denmark) Michelle Gatting (France) Célia Martin	Porsche 911 GT3 R (992)	G	136	+14 Laps
24	LMGT3	85	(Italy) Iron Dames	(Switzerland) Rahel Frey (Denmark) Michelle Gatting (France) Célia Martin	Porsche M97/80 4.2 L Flat-6	G	136	+14 Laps
25	LMGT3	61	(Italy) Iron Lynx	(Australia) Martin Berry (Netherlands) Lin Hodenius (Belgium) Maxime Martin	Mercedes-AMG GT3 Evo	G	136	+14 Laps
25	LMGT3	61	(Italy) Iron Lynx	(Australia) Martin Berry (Netherlands) Lin Hodenius (Belgium) Maxime Martin	Mercedes-AMG M159 6.2 L V8	G	136	+14 Laps
26	LMGT3	60	(Italy) Iron Lynx	(Italy) Matteo Cairoli (Australia) Brenton Grove (Australia) Stephen Grove	Mercedes-AMG GT3 Evo	G	136	+14 Laps
26	LMGT3	60	(Italy) Iron Lynx	(Italy) Matteo Cairoli (Australia) Brenton Grove (Australia) Stephen Grove	Mercedes-AMG M159 6.2 L V8	G	136	+14 Laps
27	LMGT3	33	(United Kingdom) TF Sport	(United Kingdom) Jonny Edgar (Spain) Daniel Juncadella (United States) Ben Keating	Chevrolet Corvette Z06 GT3.R	G	136	+14 Laps
27	LMGT3	33	(United Kingdom) TF Sport	(United Kingdom) Jonny Edgar (Spain) Daniel Juncadella (United States) Ben Keating	Chevrolet LT6.R 5.5 L V8	G	136	+14 Laps
28	LMGT3	81	(United Kingdom) TF Sport	(Angola) Rui Andrade (Republic of Ireland) Charlie Eastwood (Belgium) Tom van Rompuy	Chevrolet Corvette Z06 GT3.R	G	136	+14 Laps
28	LMGT3	81	(United Kingdom) TF Sport	(Angola) Rui Andrade (Republic of Ireland) Charlie Eastwood (Belgium) Tom van Rompuy	Chevrolet LT6.R 5.5 L V8	G	136	+14 Laps
29	LMGT3	59	(United Kingdom) United Autosports	(France) Sébastien Baud (United Kingdom) James Cottingham (Switzerland) Grégoire Saucy	McLaren 720S GT3 Evo	G	133	+17 Laps
29	LMGT3	59	(United Kingdom) United Autosports	(France) Sébastien Baud (United Kingdom) James Cottingham (Switzerland) Grégoire Saucy	McLaren M840T 4.0 L Turbo V8	G	133	+17 Laps
30	Hypercar	83	(Italy) AF Corse	(United Kingdom) Phil Hanson (Poland) Robert Kubica (China) Yifei Ye	Ferrari 499P	MI	111	+39 Laps
30	Hypercar	83	(Italy) AF Corse	(United Kingdom) Phil Hanson (Poland) Robert Kubica (China) Yifei Ye	Ferrari F163 3.0 L Turbo V6	MI	111	+39 Laps
Ret	Hypercar	20	(Germany) BMW M Team WRT	(Netherlands) Robin Frijns (Germany) René Rast	BMW M Hybrid V8	MI	132	Brakes
Ret	Hypercar	20	(Germany) BMW M Team WRT	(Netherlands) Robin Frijns (Germany) René Rast	BMW P66/3 4.0 L Turbo V8	MI	132	Brakes
Ret	Hypercar	94	(France) Peugeot TotalEnergies	(France) Loïc Duval (Denmark) Malthe Jakobsen (Belgium) Stoffel Vandoorne	Peugeot 9X8	MI	99	Suspension
Ret	Hypercar	94	(France) Peugeot TotalEnergies	(France) Loïc Duval (Denmark) Malthe Jakobsen (Belgium) Stoffel Vandoorne	Peugeot X6H 2.6 L Turbo V6	MI	99	Suspension
Ret	LMGT3	95	(United Kingdom) United Autosports	(Indonesia) Sean Gelael (United Kingdom) Darren Leung (Japan) Marino Sato	McLaren 720S GT3 Evo	G	68	Crash
Ret	LMGT3	95	(United Kingdom) United Autosports	(Indonesia) Sean Gelael (United Kingdom) Darren Leung (Japan) Marino Sato	McLaren M840T 4.0 L Turbo V8	G	68	Crash
Ret	LMGT3	87	(France) Akkodis ASP Team	(Argentina) José María López (Austria) Clemens Schmid (Romania) Răzvan Umbrărescu	Lexus RC F GT3	G	29	Fuel Pump
Ret	LMGT3	87	(France) Akkodis ASP Team	(Argentina) José María López (Austria) Clemens Schmid (Romania) Răzvan Umbrărescu	Lexus 2UR-GSE 5.4 L V8	G	29	Fuel Pump
Ret	LMGT3	31	(Belgium) The Bend Team WRT	Timur Boguslavskiy (Brazil) Augusto Farfus (Australia) Yasser Shahin	BMW M4 GT3	G	29	Steering
Ret	LMGT3	31	(Belgium) The Bend Team WRT	Timur Boguslavskiy (Brazil) Augusto Farfus (Australia) Yasser Shahin	BMW P58 3.0 L Turbo I6	G	29	Steering
Ret	Hypercar	99	(Germany) Proton Competition	(Switzerland) Neel Jani (Chile) Nico Pino (Argentina) Nicolás Varrone	Porsche 963	MI	22	Transmission
Ret	Hypercar	99	(Germany) Proton Competition	(Switzerland) Neel Jani (Chile) Nico Pino (Argentina) Nicolás Varrone	Porsche 9RD 4.6 L Turbo V8	MI	22	Transmission

FIA World Endurance Championship
Previous race: 6 Hours of Imola	2025 season	Next race: 24 Hours of Le Mans
