= 2026 6 Hours of Spa-Francorchamps =

Sports car endurance race

(Belgium) 2026 6 Hours of Spa-Francorchamps
Event information
- Round 2 of 8 in the 2026 FIA World Endurance Championship
- Date: 9 May 2026
- Location: Stavelot
- Venue: Circuit de Spa-Francorchamps
- Duration: 6 hours
- Weather: Sunny, Air temperature: 17.7 °C (63.9 °F). Track temperature: 25.5 °C (77.9 °F)

Results
- Laps completed: 151
- Distance (km): 1,057.60
- Distance (miles): 657.15
- Hypercar

Pole position
- Time: 2:00.653
- Team: (France) Peugeot TotalEnergies
- Drivers: (France) Loïc Duval (Denmark) Malthe Jakobsen (France) Théo Pourchaire

Winners
- Team: (Germany) BMW M Team WRT
- Drivers: (Netherlands) Robin Frijns (Germany) René Rast (South Africa) Sheldon van der Linde
- LMGT3

Winners
- Team: (United Kingdom) Garage 59
- Drivers: (Hong Kong) Antares Au (United Kingdom) Tom Fleming (Germany) Marvin Kirchhöfer

The 2026 6 Hours of Spa-Francorchamps (formally known as the 2026 TotalEnergies 6 Hours of Spa-Francorchamps) was an endurance sportscar racing event, held between 7 and 9 May 2026 at Circuit de Spa-Francorchamps in Stavelot, Belgium. It was the second of eight rounds of the 2026 FIA World Endurance Championship, the 60th running of the event, and the 15th running of the event as part of the World Endurance Championship.

== Entry list ==
The provisional entry list was published on 27 April 2026 and consists of 35 entries across 2 categories – 17 in Hypercar and 18 in LMGT3. In the Hypercar category, Louis Delétraz joined the No. 12 Cadillac Hertz Team JOTA Cadillac while Jack Aitken joined the sister No. 38 entry.

== Schedule ==
Date	Time (local: CEST)	Event
Thursday, 7 May	11:00	Free Practice 1
Thursday, 7 May	16:40	Free Practice 2
Friday, 8 May	10:10	Free Practice 3
Friday, 8 May	14:30	Qualifying – LMGT3
Friday, 8 May	14:55	Hyperpole – LMGT3
Friday, 8 May	15:20	Qualifying – Hypercar
Friday, 8 May	15:45	Hyperpole – Hypercar
Saturday, 9 May	14:00	Race

== Practice ==
Three practice sessions are scheduled to be held before the event: two on Thursday and one on Friday.

=== Practice 1 ===
The first practice session started at 11:00 CEST on Thursday.

Class	No.	Entrant	Driver	Time
Hypercar	50	(Italy) Ferrari AF Corse	(Italy) Antonio Fuoco	2:02.955
LMGT3	34	Racing Team Turkey by TF	(Republic of Ireland) Charlie Eastwood	2:18.034

- Note: Only the fastest car in each class is shown.

=== Practice 2 ===
The second practice session started at 16:40 CEST on Thursday.

Class	No.	Entrant	Driver	Time
Hypercar	36	(France) Alpine Endurance Team	(France) Jules Gounon	2:01.816
LMGT3	23	(United States) Heart of Racing Team	(Brazil) Eduardo Barrichello	2:17.769

- Note: Only the fastest car in each class is shown.

=== Practice 3 ===
The third and final practice session started at 10:10 CEST on Friday.

Class	No.	Entrant	Driver	Time
Hypercar	12	(United States) Cadillac Hertz Team Jota	(United Kingdom) Will Stevens	2:02.379
LMGT3	58	(United Kingdom) Garage 59	(Germany) Finn Gehrsitz	2:17.068

- Note: Only the fastest car in each class is shown.

== Qualifying ==
Qualifying started at 14:30 CEST on Friday, with one fifteen-minute qualifying session and one twelve-minute hyperpole session per class, resulting in two qualifying and two hyperpole sessions in total.

=== Qualifying results ===
Pole position winners in each class are marked in bold.

Pos.	Class	No.	Team	Qualifying	Hyperpole	Grid
1	**Hypercar**	**94**	**(France) Peugeot TotalEnergies**	**2:01.023**	**2:00.653**	1
2	Hypercar	12	(United States) Cadillac Hertz Team Jota	2:01.239	2:00.696	2
3	Hypercar	35	(France) Alpine Endurance Team	2:00.808	2:00.731	3
4	Hypercar	36	(France) Alpine Endurance Team	2:01.039	2:00.838	4
5	Hypercar	38	(United States) Cadillac Hertz Team Jota	2:01.458	2:00.940	5
6	Hypercar	009	(United Kingdom) Aston Martin THOR Team	2:01.448	2:01.013	6
7	Hypercar	007	(United Kingdom) Aston Martin THOR Team	2:01.563	2:01.052	7
8	Hypercar	50	(Italy) Ferrari AF Corse	2:01.181	2:01.117	8
9	Hypercar	93	(France) Peugeot TotalEnergies	2:01.210	2:01.198	9
10	Hypercar	15	(Belgium) BMW M Team WRT	2:01.356	2:01.317	10
11	Hypercar	20	(Belgium) BMW M Team WRT	2:01.573		11
12	Hypercar	7	(Japan) Toyota Racing	2:01.592		12
13	Hypercar	83	(Italy) AF Corse	2:01.777		13
14	Hypercar	19	(South Korea) Genesis Magma Racing	2:01.824		14
15	Hypercar	51	(Italy) Ferrari AF Corse	2:01.848		15
16	Hypercar	8	(Japan) Toyota Racing	2:02.164		16
17	Hypercar	17	(South Korea) Genesis Magma Racing	2:03.305		17
18	**LMGT3**	**78**	**(France) Akkodis ASP Team**	**2:18.843**	**2:16.612**	18
19	LMGT3	27	(United States) Heart of Racing Team	2:18.538	2:16.806	19
20	LMGT3	77	(Germany) Proton Competition	2:18.076	2:16.824	20
21	LMGT3	87	(France) Akkodis ASP Team	2:17.225	2:16.968	21
22	LMGT3	88	(Germany) Proton Competition	2:17.653	2:17.037	22
23	LMGT3	21	(Italy) Vista AF Corse	2:18.393	2:17.263	23
24	LMGT3	32	(Belgium) Team WRT	2:18.599	2:17.356	24
25	LMGT3	61	(Italy) Iron Lynx	2:18.059	2:17.532	25
26	LMGT3	91	(Germany) Manthey DK Engineering	2:18.329	2:18.066	26
27	LMGT3	34	Racing Team Turkey by TF	2:18.251	2:18.333	27
28	LMGT3	58	(United Kingdom) Garage 59	2:18.910		28
29	LMGT3	92	(Germany) The Bend Manthey	2:18.986		29
30	LMGT3	23	(United States) Heart of Racing Team	2:19.102		30
31	LMGT3	33	(United Kingdom) TF Sport	2:19.170		31
32	LMGT3	10	(United Kingdom) Garage 59	2:19.193		32
33	LMGT3	79	(Italy) Iron Lynx	2:19.690		33
34	LMGT3	69	(Belgium) Team WRT	2:19.747		34
35	LMGT3	54	(Italy) Vista AF Corse	2:19.781		35

== Race ==
The race started at 14:00 CEST on Saturday, and ran for six hours.

=== Race results ===
The minimum number of laps for classification (70% of overall winning car's distance) was 106 laps. Class winners are in bold and ‡.

Pos	Class	No.	Team	Drivers	Car	Tyres	Laps	Time/Retired
Pos	Class	No.	Team	Drivers	Engine	Tyres	Laps	Time/Retired
1	**Hypercar**	**20**	**(Belgium) BMW M Team WRT**	**(Netherlands) Robin Frijns** **(South Africa) Sheldon van der Linde** **(Germany) René Rast**	**BMW M Hybrid V8**	MI	**151**	**6:01:17.036**
1	**Hypercar**	**20**	**(Belgium) BMW M Team WRT**	**(Netherlands) Robin Frijns** **(South Africa) Sheldon van der Linde** **(Germany) René Rast**	**BMW P66/3 4.0 L Turbo V8**	MI	**151**	**6:01:17.036**
2	Hypercar	15	(Belgium) BMW M Team WRT	(Denmark) Kevin Magnussen (Switzerland) Raffaele Marciello (Belgium) Dries Vanthoor	BMW M Hybrid V8	MI	151	+1.969
2	Hypercar	15	(Belgium) BMW M Team WRT	(Denmark) Kevin Magnussen (Switzerland) Raffaele Marciello (Belgium) Dries Vanthoor	BMW P66/3 4.0 L Turbo V8	MI	151	+1.969
3	Hypercar	50	(Italy) Ferrari AF Corse	(Italy) Antonio Fuoco (Spain) Miguel Molina (Denmark) Nicklas Nielsen	Ferrari 499P	MI	151	+2.622
3	Hypercar	50	(Italy) Ferrari AF Corse	(Italy) Antonio Fuoco (Spain) Miguel Molina (Denmark) Nicklas Nielsen	Ferrari F163CG 3.0 L Turbo V6	MI	151	+2.622
4	Hypercar	007	(United Kingdom) Aston Martin THOR Team	(United Kingdom) Tom Gamble (United Kingdom) Harry Tincknell	Aston Martin Valkyrie	MI	151	+5.004
4	Hypercar	007	(United Kingdom) Aston Martin THOR Team	(United Kingdom) Tom Gamble (United Kingdom) Harry Tincknell	Aston Martin RA 6.5 L V12	MI	151	+5.004
5	Hypercar	7	(Japan) Toyota Racing	(United Kingdom) Mike Conway (Japan) Kamui Kobayashi (Netherlands) Nyck de Vries	Toyota TR010 Hybrid	MI	151	+6.015
5	Hypercar	7	(Japan) Toyota Racing	(United Kingdom) Mike Conway (Japan) Kamui Kobayashi (Netherlands) Nyck de Vries	Toyota H8909 3.5 L Turbo V6	MI	151	+6.015
6	Hypercar	83	(Italy) AF Corse	(United Kingdom) Philip Hanson (Poland) Robert Kubica (China) Yifei Ye	Ferrari 499P	MI	151	+11.552
6	Hypercar	83	(Italy) AF Corse	(United Kingdom) Philip Hanson (Poland) Robert Kubica (China) Yifei Ye	Ferrari F163CG 3.0 L Turbo V6	MI	151	+11.552
7	Hypercar	93	(France) Peugeot TotalEnergies	(New Zealand) Nick Cassidy (United Kingdom) Paul di Resta (Belgium) Stoffel Vandoorne	Peugeot 9X8	MI	151	+12.861
7	Hypercar	93	(France) Peugeot TotalEnergies	(New Zealand) Nick Cassidy (United Kingdom) Paul di Resta (Belgium) Stoffel Vandoorne	Peugeot X6H 2.6 L Turbo V6	MI	151	+12.861
8	Hypercar	17	(South Korea) Genesis Magma Racing	(Brazil) Pipo Derani (France) Mathys Jaubert (Germany) André Lotterer	Genesis GMR-001	MI	151	+29.882
8	Hypercar	17	(South Korea) Genesis Magma Racing	(Brazil) Pipo Derani (France) Mathys Jaubert (Germany) André Lotterer	Genesis G8MR 3.2 L Turbo V8	MI	151	+29.882
9	Hypercar	12	(United States) Cadillac Hertz Team JOTA	(Switzerland) Louis Delétraz (France) Norman Nato (United Kingdom) Will Stevens	Cadillac V-Series.R	MI	151	+31.837
9	Hypercar	12	(United States) Cadillac Hertz Team JOTA	(Switzerland) Louis Delétraz (France) Norman Nato (United Kingdom) Will Stevens	Cadillac LMC55R 5.5 L V8	MI	151	+31.837
10	Hypercar	8	(Japan) Toyota Racing	(Switzerland) Sébastien Buemi (New Zealand) Brendon Hartley (Japan) Ryo Hirakawa	Toyota TR010 Hybrid	MI	151	+32.165
10	Hypercar	8	(Japan) Toyota Racing	(Switzerland) Sébastien Buemi (New Zealand) Brendon Hartley (Japan) Ryo Hirakawa	Toyota H8909 3.5 L Turbo V6	MI	151	+32.165
11	Hypercar	36	(France) Alpine Endurance Team	(France) Jules Gounon (France) Frédéric Makowiecki (France) Victor Martins	Alpine A424	MI	151	+32.376
11	Hypercar	36	(France) Alpine Endurance Team	(France) Jules Gounon (France) Frédéric Makowiecki (France) Victor Martins	Alpine V634 3.4 L Turbo V6	MI	151	+32.376
12	Hypercar	35	(France) Alpine Endurance Team	(Portugal) António Félix da Costa (Austria) Ferdinand Habsburg (France) Charles Milesi	Alpine A424	MI	149	+2 Laps
12	Hypercar	35	(France) Alpine Endurance Team	(Portugal) António Félix da Costa (Austria) Ferdinand Habsburg (France) Charles Milesi	Alpine V634 3.4 L Turbo V6	MI	149	+2 Laps
13	Hypercar	19	(South Korea) Genesis Magma Racing	(France) Paul-Loup Chatin (France) Mathieu Jaminet (Spain) Daniel Juncadella	Genesis GMR-001	MI	143	+8 Laps
13	Hypercar	19	(South Korea) Genesis Magma Racing	(France) Paul-Loup Chatin (France) Mathieu Jaminet (Spain) Daniel Juncadella	Genesis G8MR 3.2 L Turbo V8	MI	143	+8 Laps
14	**LMGT3**	**10**	**(United Kingdom) Garage 59**	**(Hong Kong) Antares Au** **(United Kingdom) Tom Fleming** **(Germany) Marvin Kirchhöfer**	**McLaren 720S GT3 Evo**	G	**139**	**+12 Laps**
14	**LMGT3**	**10**	**(United Kingdom) Garage 59**	**(Hong Kong) Antares Au** **(United Kingdom) Tom Fleming** **(Germany) Marvin Kirchhöfer**	**McLaren M840T 4.0 L Turbo V8**	G	**139**	**+12 Laps**
15	LMGT3	27	(United States) Heart of Racing Team	(Italy) Mattia Drudi (United Kingdom) Ian James (Canada) Zacharie Robichon	Aston Martin Vantage AMR GT3 Evo	G	139	+12 Laps
15	LMGT3	27	(United States) Heart of Racing Team	(Italy) Mattia Drudi (United Kingdom) Ian James (Canada) Zacharie Robichon	Aston Martin M177 4.0 L Turbo V8	G	139	+12 Laps
16	LMGT3	92	(Germany) The Bend Manthey	(Austria) Richard Lietz (Italy) Riccardo Pera (Australia) Yasser Shahin	Porsche 911 GT3 R (992.2)	G	139	+12 Laps
16	LMGT3	92	(Germany) The Bend Manthey	(Austria) Richard Lietz (Italy) Riccardo Pera (Australia) Yasser Shahin	Porsche M97/80 4.2 L Flat-6	G	139	+12 Laps
17	LMGT3	21	(Italy) Vista AF Corse	(France) François Hériau (United States) Simon Mann (Italy) Alessio Rovera	Ferrari 296 GT3 Evo	G	139	+12 Laps
17	LMGT3	21	(Italy) Vista AF Corse	(France) François Hériau (United States) Simon Mann (Italy) Alessio Rovera	Ferrari F163CE 3.0 L Turbo V6	G	139	+12 Laps
18	LMGT3	58	(United Kingdom) Garage 59	(Germany) Finn Gehrsitz (Germany) Benjamin Goethe (Sweden) Alexander West	McLaren 720S GT3 Evo	G	139	+12 Laps
18	LMGT3	58	(United Kingdom) Garage 59	(Germany) Finn Gehrsitz (Germany) Benjamin Goethe (Sweden) Alexander West	McLaren M840T 4.0 L Turbo V8	G	139	+12 Laps
19	LMGT3	87	(France) Akkodis ASP Team	(Argentina) José María López (Austria) Clemens Schmid (Romania) Răzvan Umbrărescu	Lexus RC F GT3	G	139	+12 Laps
19	LMGT3	87	(France) Akkodis ASP Team	(Argentina) José María López (Austria) Clemens Schmid (Romania) Răzvan Umbrărescu	Lexus 2UR-GSE 5.4 L V8	G	139	+12 Laps
20	LMGT3	91	(Germany) Manthey DK Engineering	Timur Boguslavskiy (United Kingdom) James Cottingham (Turkey) Ayhancan Güven	Porsche 911 GT3 R (992.2)	G	139	+12 Laps
20	LMGT3	91	(Germany) Manthey DK Engineering	Timur Boguslavskiy (United Kingdom) James Cottingham (Turkey) Ayhancan Güven	Porsche M97/80 4.2 L Flat-6	G	139	+12 Laps
21	LMGT3	33	(United Kingdom) TF Sport	(Netherlands) Nicky Catsburg (United Kingdom) Jonny Edgar (United States) Blake McDonald	Chevrolet Corvette Z06 GT3.R	G	139	+12 Laps
21	LMGT3	33	(United Kingdom) TF Sport	(Netherlands) Nicky Catsburg (United Kingdom) Jonny Edgar (United States) Blake McDonald	Chevrolet LT6.R 5.5 L V8	G	139	+12 Laps
22	LMGT3	34	Racing Team Turkey by TF	(Republic of Ireland) Peter Dempsey (Republic of Ireland) Charlie Eastwood (Turkey) Salih Yoluç	Chevrolet Corvette Z06 GT3.R	G	139	+12 Laps
22	LMGT3	34	Racing Team Turkey by TF	(Republic of Ireland) Peter Dempsey (Republic of Ireland) Charlie Eastwood (Turkey) Salih Yoluç	Chevrolet LT6.R 5.5 L V8	G	139	+12 Laps
23	LMGT3	61	(Italy) Iron Lynx	(Angola) Rui Andrade (Australia) Martin Berry (Belgium) Maxime Martin	Mercedes-AMG GT3 Evo	G	139	+12 Laps
23	LMGT3	61	(Italy) Iron Lynx	(Angola) Rui Andrade (Australia) Martin Berry (Belgium) Maxime Martin	Mercedes-AMG M159 6.2 L V8	G	139	+12 Laps
24	LMGT3	69	(Belgium) Team WRT	(United Kingdom) Dan Harper (United States) Anthony McIntosh (Canada) Parker Thompson	BMW M4 GT3 Evo	G	139	+12 Laps
24	LMGT3	69	(Belgium) Team WRT	(United Kingdom) Dan Harper (United States) Anthony McIntosh (Canada) Parker Thompson	BMW P58 3.0 L Turbo I6	G	139	+12 Laps
25	LMGT3	88	(Germany) Proton Competition	(Italy) Stefano Gattuso (Italy) Giammarco Levorato (United States) Logan Sargeant	Ford Mustang GT3 Evo	G	139	+12 Laps
25	LMGT3	88	(Germany) Proton Competition	(Italy) Stefano Gattuso (Italy) Giammarco Levorato (United States) Logan Sargeant	Ford Coyote 5.4 L V8	G	139	+12 Laps
26	LMGT3	23	(United States) Heart of Racing Team	(United Kingdom) Jonny Adam (Brazil) Eduardo Barrichello (United States) Gray Newell	Aston Martin Vantage AMR GT3 Evo	G	139	+12 Laps
26	LMGT3	23	(United States) Heart of Racing Team	(United Kingdom) Jonny Adam (Brazil) Eduardo Barrichello (United States) Gray Newell	Aston Martin M177 4.0 L Turbo V8	G	139	+12 Laps
27	LMGT3	32	(Belgium) Team WRT	(Brazil) Augusto Farfus (Indonesia) Sean Gelael (United Kingdom) Darren Leung	BMW M4 GT3 Evo	G	139	+12 Laps
27	LMGT3	32	(Belgium) Team WRT	(Brazil) Augusto Farfus (Indonesia) Sean Gelael (United Kingdom) Darren Leung	BMW P58 3.0 L Turbo I6	G	139	+12 Laps
28	LMGT3	54	(Italy) Vista AF Corse	(Italy) Francesco Castellacci (Switzerland) Thomas Flohr (Italy) Davide Rigon	Ferrari 296 GT3 Evo	G	138	+13 Laps
28	LMGT3	54	(Italy) Vista AF Corse	(Italy) Francesco Castellacci (Switzerland) Thomas Flohr (Italy) Davide Rigon	Ferrari F163CE 3.0 L Turbo V6	G	138	+13 Laps
29	LMGT3	77	(Germany) Proton Competition	(United States) Eric Powell (United Kingdom) Sebastian Priaulx (United Kingdom) Ben Tuck	Ford Mustang GT3 Evo	G	127	+24 Laps
29	LMGT3	77	(Germany) Proton Competition	(United States) Eric Powell (United Kingdom) Sebastian Priaulx (United Kingdom) Ben Tuck	Ford Coyote 5.4 L V8	G	127	+24 Laps
Ret	Hypercar	009	(United Kingdom) Aston Martin THOR Team	(Spain) Alex Riberas (Denmark) Marco Sørensen	Aston Martin Valkyrie	MI	136	Accident
Ret	Hypercar	009	(United Kingdom) Aston Martin THOR Team	(Spain) Alex Riberas (Denmark) Marco Sørensen	Aston Martin RA 6.5 L V12	MI	136	Accident
Ret	Hypercar	51	(Italy) Ferrari AF Corse	(United Kingdom) James Calado (Italy) Antonio Giovinazzi (Italy) Alessandro Pier Guidi	Ferrari 499P	MI	129	Collision
Ret	Hypercar	51	(Italy) Ferrari AF Corse	(United Kingdom) James Calado (Italy) Antonio Giovinazzi (Italy) Alessandro Pier Guidi	Ferrari F163CG 3.0 L Turbo V6	MI	129	Collision
Ret	LMGT3	79	(Italy) Iron Lynx	(Italy) Matteo Cressoni (Netherlands) Lin Hodenius (Italy) Johannes Zelger	Mercedes-AMG GT3 Evo	G	95	Accident
Ret	LMGT3	79	(Italy) Iron Lynx	(Italy) Matteo Cressoni (Netherlands) Lin Hodenius (Italy) Johannes Zelger	Mercedes-AMG M159 6.2 L V8	G	95	Accident
Ret	LMGT3	78	(France) Akkodis ASP Team	(France) Hadrien David (France) Esteban Masson (Belgium) Tom Van Rompuy	Lexus RC F GT3	G	118	Mechanical
Ret	LMGT3	78	(France) Akkodis ASP Team	(France) Hadrien David (France) Esteban Masson (Belgium) Tom Van Rompuy	Lexus 2UR-GSE 5.4 L V8	G	118	Mechanical
Ret	Hypercar	94	(France) Peugeot TotalEnergies	(France) Loïc Duval (Denmark) Malthe Jakobsen (France) Théo Pourchaire	Peugeot 9X8	MI	103	Accident damage
Ret	Hypercar	94	(France) Peugeot TotalEnergies	(France) Loïc Duval (Denmark) Malthe Jakobsen (France) Théo Pourchaire	Peugeot X6H 2.6 L Turbo V6	MI	103	Accident damage
Ret	Hypercar	38	(United States) Cadillac Hertz Team JOTA	(United Kingdom) Jack Aitken (New Zealand) Earl Bamber (France) Sébastien Bourdais	Cadillac V-Series.R	MI	85	Mechanical
Ret	Hypercar	38	(United States) Cadillac Hertz Team JOTA	(United Kingdom) Jack Aitken (New Zealand) Earl Bamber (France) Sébastien Bourdais	Cadillac LMC55R 5.5 L V8	MI	85	Mechanical

FIA World Endurance Championship
Previous race: 6 Hours of Imola	2026 season	Next race: 24 Hours of Le Mans
