= Frédéric Makowiecki =

French racing driver (born 1980)

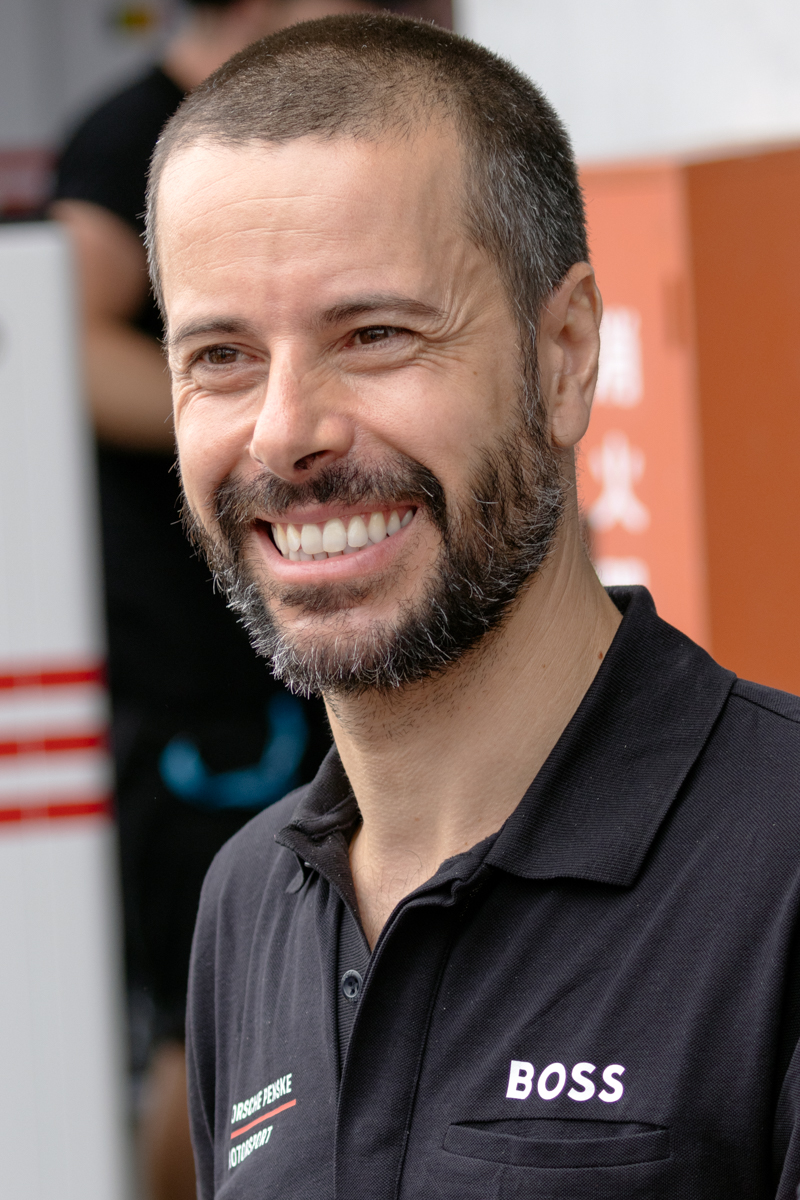
- Makowiecki at the 2024 6 Hours of Fuji
- Nationality: (France) French
- Born: 22 November 1980 (age 45) Arras, France

FIA World Endurance Championship career
- Debut season: 2012
- Current team: Alpine Endurance Team
- Categorisation: FIA Gold (until 2013); FIA Platinum (2014–)
- Car number: 36
- Former teams: Aston Martin Racing, Luxury Racing, Team Manthey, Porsche GT Team, Porsche Penske Motorsport
- Starts: 69
- Wins: 6
- Poles: 10
- Fastest laps: 6
- Best finish: 2nd in 2014, 2017

Previous series
- 2013 2010–2012 2006–09 2006, 08 2005, 07–08, 10 2003–04, 2006–2010 2000: Super GT; FIA GT1 World Championship; FIA GT3; FIA GT Championship; FFSA GT Championship; Porsche Carrera Cup France; French Formula Three

Frédéric Makowiecki (born 22 November 1980), nicknamed Fred Mako, is a French professional racing driver, best known for his endurance racing career with Porsche. He currently competes for Alpine in the Hypercar class of the FIA World Endurance Championship.

A versatile sports car racer, Makowiecki progressed from FIA GT3 to the FIA GT1 World Championship in 2010. He won races in all three of its seasons, each in a different car, and missed out on the 2012 title by one point in a Hexis Racing McLaren. Makowiecki made his 24 Hours of Le Mans debut in 2011, and set pole twice in a row—in 2012 in Luxury Racing's privateer Ferrari, and in 2013 for Aston Martin Racing.

In 2014, Makowiecki signed for Porsche as factory driver, focusing on its GTE Pro efforts. He was FIA World Endurance Championship runner-up in 2014 and 2017, and won the 2022 24 Hours of Le Mans in class with Gianmaria Bruni and Richard Lietz. Additionally, Makowiecki won a rain-soaked Nürburgring 24 Hours in 2018, and three editions of the 12 Hours of Sebring between 2018 and 2020. Makowiecki was also loaned out sporadically to the Japanese Super GT, taking wins for both Honda and Nissan.

Makowiecki developed Porsche's new LMDh car, the Porsche 963, for its race debut in 2023, and delivered four podiums for the Porsche Penske team. Makowiecki joined Alpine in 2025, starring at the 6 Hours of Spa with an early charge to the lead.

== Career ==
After competing in karting, Arras-born Makowiecki raced in the French Formula Three Championship, finishing fourth in Class B.

In 2003, Makowiecki began competing in the Porsche Carrera Cup France, finishing third in points in 2004 and 2009, and second in 2006 and 2007. He won the title in 2010 with six victories, 11 podiums, and three poles.

Makowiecki finished fourth in the 2009 FIA GT3 European Championship while driving for Hexis Racing AMR. He continued with the team in the 2010 FIA GT1 World Championship, drove for Marc VDS Racing Team in 2011, and rejoined Hexis for 2012.

Makowiecki joined Luxury Racing for the final year of the Intercontinental Le Mans Cup in 2011. He continued with Luxury Racing for the beginning of the 2012 FIA World Endurance Championship season, taking pole position at Le Mans in his final race with the team. He moved to Aston Martin Racing in 2013, claiming two wins for the team at the 6 Hours of Circuit of the Americas and the 6 Hours of Fuji. For the 2014 FIA World Endurance Championship season, he drives for Porsche AG Team Manthey in the GTE-Pro class.

In 2013, Makowiecki co-drove with Naoki Yamamoto for Weider Dome Racing, taking the win at the 42nd International Pokka Sapporo 1000km at Suzuka Circuit.

Makowiecki has been a Porsche Motorsport factory driver since 2014. He won the 2018 and 2019 12 Hours of Sebring, and the 2018 and 2020 Petit Le Mans, and the 2022 24 Hours of Le Mans, always with a Porsche 911.

For the 2023 season, Makowiecki joined the Hypercar in the World Endurance Championship, driving a Porsche 963 alongside Dane Cameron and Michael Christensen.

== Racing record ==
=== Career summary ===
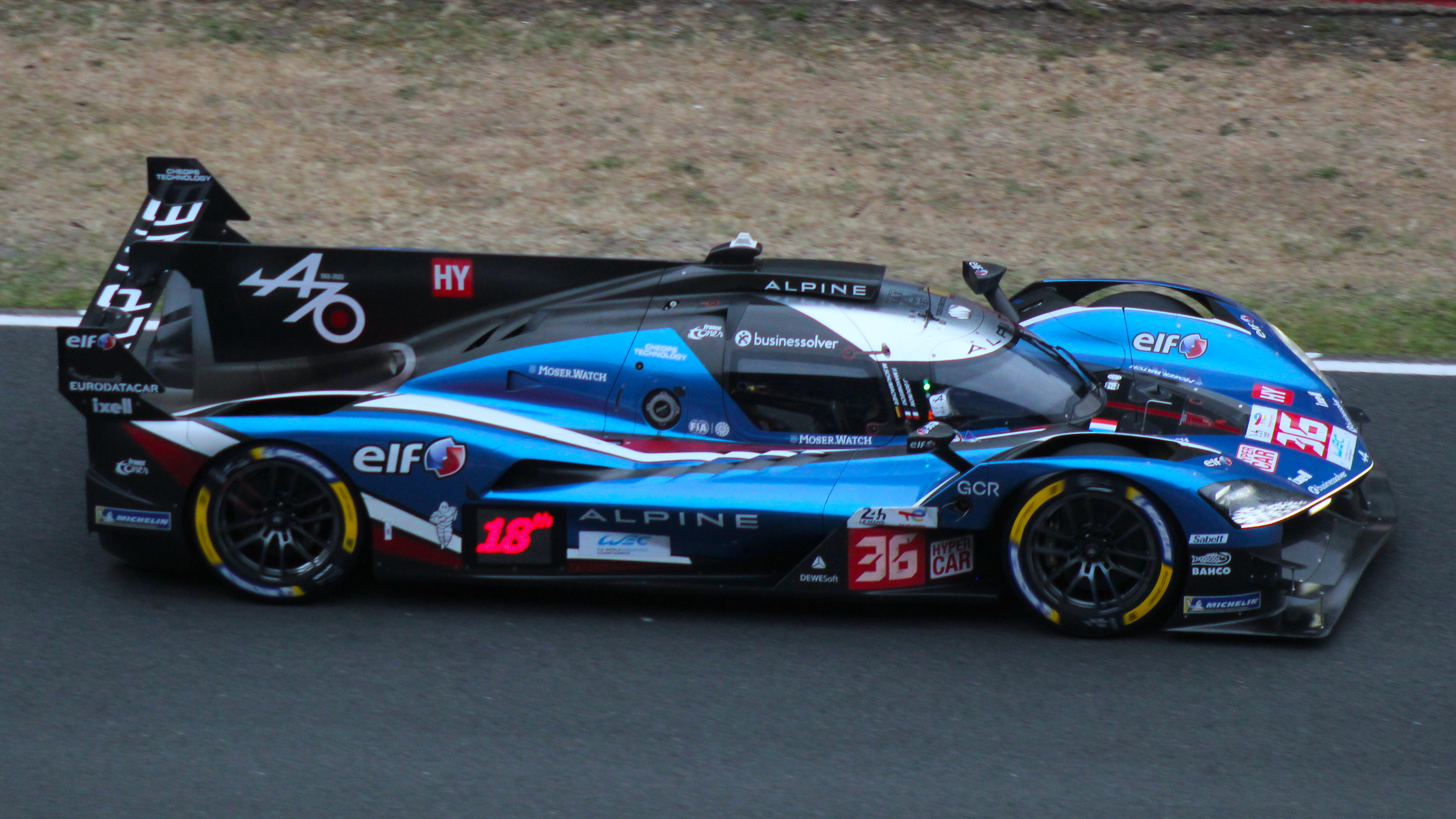
Makowiecki's No. 36 car at the 2025 24 Hours of Le Mans

Season	Series	Team	Races	Wins	Poles	F/Laps	Podiums	Points	Position
2000	Formula 3 France - Class B	Griffith's	11	0	0	0	5	124	4th
2000	Kanonloppet - Formula 3	Nourry Compétition	1	0	0	0	0	0	19th
2001	French GT Championship - GT Cup	Nourry Compétition	12	3	1	1	4	284	**2nd**
2002	French GT Championship	Chateau Sport	11	0	0	0	4	147	11th
2003	Porsche Carrera Cup France	Tillie Compétition	4	1	1	1	2	47	9th
2003	French GT Championship	Chateau Sport	7	0	1	0	1	25	32nd
2003	French GT Championship - GT Cup	Nourry Compétition	2	0	0	1	0	2	31st
2004	Porsche Carrera Cup France	Nourry Compétition	14	1	0	6	8	146	**3rd**
2004	French GT Championship - GT Cup	CD Sport	14	6	3	6	8	352	**1st**
2005	French GT Championship	MTO Mirabeau Compétition	15	1	1	1	2	132	6th
2006	French GT Championship	MTO Mirabeau, Racing Logistic	11	1	0	2	1	?	?
2006	Porsche Carrera Cup France	Nourry Compétition	14	1	1	2	8	128.5	**2nd**
2006	FIA GT3 European Championship	Racing Logistic	6	0	0	0	0	6	21st
2006	FIA GT Championship - GT1	Nourry Compétition	1	0	1	0	0	0	NC
2007	French GT Championship	Larbre Compétition	14	2	1	2	5	160	5th
2007	Porsche Carrera Cup France	Nourry Compétition	14	2	2	2	7	155	**2nd**
2007	FIA GT3 European Championship	Hexis Racing	9	0	2	2	1	11	10th
2008	Porsche Carrera Cup France	Larbre Compétition	13	2	2	1	5	111	4th
2008	French GT Championship	Larbre Compétition	8	1	2	0	4	118	8th
2008	FIA GT Championship - GT1	Larbre Compétition	1	0	0	0	0	0	NC
2008	Le Mans Series - LMGT1	Larbre Compétition	1	0	0	0	1	8	6th
2008	FIA GT3 European Championship	Hexis Racing	10	0	0	1	1	20	10th
2008	ADAC GT Masters	Hexis Racing	2	1	0	0	2	0	NC†
2009	French GT Championship - GT3	AS Events	13	0	1	5	1	10	17th
2009	FIA GT3 European Championship	Hexis Racing AMR	12	1	3	?	2	34	4th
2009	FIA GT Championship - GT2	Hexis Racing AMR	3	0	0	0	1	10	15th
2009	International GT Open - Pro-Am	Team AS Events	2	0	1	0	1	11	18th
2010	FIA GT1 World Championship	Hexis AMR	20	3	0	1	5	105	**3rd**
2010	FIA GT3 European Championship	Hexis AMR	10	1	1	2	2	69	5th
2010	Porsche Carrera Cup France	Luxury Racing	12	6	3	6	11	202	**1st**
2010	International GT Open - GTS	Luxury Racing	6	0	2	3	2	17	16th
2010	French GT Championship	Luxury Racing	5	1	1	1	3	37	12th
2011	FIA GT1 World Championship	Marc VDS Racing Team	12	4	0	0	4	69	11th
2011	Blancpain Endurance Series	Hexis AMR	5	0	0	0	0	40.5	10th
2011	Le Mans Series - LMGTE Pro	Luxury Racing	2	0	0	0	1	0	NC†
2011	American Le Mans Series - GT	Luxury Racing	1	0	0	0	0	0	NC†
2011	24 Hours of Le Mans - LMGTE Pro	Luxury Racing	1	0	0	0	0	N/A	DNF
2011	Speed EuroSeries	Springbox Concept	2	0	0	2	0	8	49th
2012	FIA GT1 World Championship	Hexis Racing	17	5	2	3	7	144	**2nd**
2012	City Challenge Baku - GT	Hexis Racing	1	1	1	0	1	N/A	**1st**
2012	Blancpain Endurance Series	Hexis Racing	1	1	1	0	1	25	15th
2012	FIA World Endurance Championship - LMGTE Pro	Luxury Racing	3	0	2	1	2	0	NC†
2012	Speed EuroSeries	Pegasus	2	1	0	0	2	29	18th
2013	Super GT - GT500	Dome Racing	8	1	0	0	1	56	4th
2013	FIA World Endurance Championship - LMGTE Pro	Aston Martin Racing	5	2	3	2	4	73.5	9th
2013	Blancpain Endurance Series	Aston Martin Racing	1	1	0	0	1	25	9th
2014	Super GT - GT500	Dome Racing	4	1	0	1	2	42	9th
2014	FIA World Endurance Championship - LMGTE Pro	Porsche Team Manthey	8	2	0	1	5	134.5	**2nd**
2014	United SportsCar Championship - GTLM	CORE Autosport	1	0	0	0	0	27	31st
2015	FIA World Endurance Championship - LMGTE Pro	Porsche Team Manthey	8	1	0	1	6	118	5th
2015	United SportsCar Championship - GTLM	Porsche North America	4	0	0	0	0	103	12th
2016	IMSA SportsCar Championship - GTLM	Porsche North America	11	1	0	0	4	313	4th
2016	24 Hours of Le Mans - LMGTE Pro	Porsche GT Team	1	0	0	0	0	N/A	DNF
2016	24 Hours of Nürburgring - SP9	Manthey Racing	1	0	0	0	0	N/A	DNF
2017	FIA World Endurance Championship - LMGTE Pro	Porsche GT Team	9	0	1	0	6	145	**2nd**
2017	IMSA SportsCar Championship - GTLM	Porsche GT Team	2	0	0	1	1	50	19th
2017	24 Hours of Nürburgring - SP9	Manthey Racing	1	0	0	0	0	N/A	DNF
2018	IMSA SportsCar Championship - GTLM	Porsche GT Team	2	0	0	1	1	50	19th
2018	Blancpain GT Series Endurance Cup	Manthey Racing	5	0	0	0	0	2	45th
2018	24 Hours of Nürburgring - SP9	Manthey Racing	1	1	0	0	1	N/A	**1st**
2018-19	FIA World Endurance Championship - LMGTE Pro	Porsche GT Team	2	0	1	1	2	55	11th
2019	Super GT - GT500	NDDP by B-Max Racing	7	1	0	1	1	36	9th
2019	IMSA SportsCar Championship - GTLM	Porsche GT Team	3	1	2	1	1	86	15th
2019	Blancpain GT Series Endurance Cup	Rowe Racing	1	0	0	1	1	18	14th
2019	24 Hours of Nürburgring - SP9	Manthey Racing	1	0	0	0	0	N/A	DNF
2019-20	FIA World Endurance Championship - LMGTE Pro	Porsche GT Team	1	0	1	0	0	5	30th
2020	IMSA SportsCar Championship - GTLM	Porsche GT Team	10	2	3	2	6	297	5th
2020	GT World Challenge Europe Endurance Cup	Frikadelli Racing Team	1	0	0	0	0	5	25th
2021	IMSA SportsCar Championship - GTLM	WeatherTech Racing	1	0	0	0	1	348	11th
2021	FIA World Endurance Championship - LMGTE Pro	Porsche GT Team	3	0	0	0	2	66	6th
2021	GT World Challenge Europe Endurance Cup	Schnabl Engineering	1	0	0	0	0	4	36th
2021	24 Hours of Nürburgring - SP9	Frikadelli Racing Team	1	0	0	0	0	N/A	DNF
2022	FIA World Endurance Championship - LMGTE Pro	Porsche GT Team	2	1	0	0	1	60	7th
2022	24 Hours of Nürburgring - SP9	Manthey Racing	1	0	0	0	0	N/A	DNF
2023	FIA World Endurance Championship - Hypercar	Porsche Penske Motorsport	7	0	0	0	0	61	7th
2023	GT World Challenge Europe Endurance Cup	CLRT	3	0	0	0	0	0	NC
2023	24 Hours of Nürburgring - SP9	Manthey Racing	1	0	0	0	0	N/A	DNF
2024	FIA World Endurance Championship - Hypercar	Porsche Penske Motorsport	8	0	2	0	4	104	5th
2024	IMSA SportsCar Championship - GTP	Porsche Penske Motorsport	1	0	0	0	0	241	35th
2024	IMSA SportsCar Championship - GTD	Wright Motorsports	1	0	0	0	0	252	54th
2024	GT World Challenge Europe Endurance Cup	SSR Herberth	1	0	0	0	0	4	28th
2025	FIA World Endurance Championship - Hypercar	Alpine Endurance Team	8	0	0	0	2	36	16th
2026	FIA World Endurance Championship - Hypercar	Alpine Endurance Team	5	0	0	0	0	14	19th
2026	GT World Challenge Europe Endurance Cup	Schumacher CLRT	1	0	0	0	0	12	21st

† Ineligible for points

=== Complete GT1 World Championship results ===
(key) (Races in bold indicate pole position) (Races in italics indicate fastest lap)

Year	Team	Car	1	2	3	4	5	6	7	8	9	10	11	12	13	14	15	16	17	18	19	20	Pos	Points
2010	Hexis AMR	Aston Martin	ABU; QR; 7	ABU; CR; Ret	SIL; QR; 1	SIL; CR; 2	BRN; QR; 8	BRN; CR; 9	PRI; QR; 11	PRI; CR; 9	SPA; QR; Ret	SPA; CR; 5	NÜR; QR; Ret	NÜR; CR; 7	ALG; QR; 10	ALG; CR; 6	NAV; QR; 9	NAV; CR; 2	INT; QR; 15	INT; CR; 13	SAN; QR; 1	SAN; CR; 1	**3rd**	**105**
2011	Marc VDS Racing Team	Ford	ABU; QR; 1	ABU; CR; 8	ZOL; QR; 5	ZOL; CR; 8	ALG; QR	ALG; CR	SAC; QR; 1	SAC; CR; Ret	SIL; QR; NC	SIL; CR; Ret	NAV; QR	NAV; CR	PRI; QR; 5	PRI; CR; 6	ORD; QR; 1	ORD; CR; 1	BEI; QR	BEI; CR	SAN; QR	SAN; CR	11th	69
2012	Hexis Racing	McLaren	NOG; QR; DNS	NOG; CR; Ret	ZOL; QR; 4	ZOL; CR; 5	NAV; QR; 1	NAV; QR; 1	SVK; QR; 9	SVK; CR; 2	ALG; QR; 4	ALG; CR; 3	SVK; QR; 8	SVK; CR; Ret	MOS; QR; 4	MOS; CR; 1	NUR; QR; Ret	NUR; CR; 10	DON; QR; 1	DON; CR; 1			2nd	144

=== Complete Super GT results ===
(key) (Races in bold indicate pole position) (Races in italics indicate fastest lap)

Year	Team	Car	Class	1	2	3	4	5	6	7	8	DC	Points
2013	Dome Racing	Honda HSV-010 GT	GT500	OKA; 5	FUJ; 10	SEP; 4	SUG; Ret	SUZ; 1	FUJ; 5	AUT; 5	MOT; 7	4th	56
2014	Dome Racing	Honda NSX Concept-GT	GT500	OKA	FUJ	AUT	SUG; 8	FUJ; 1	SUZ; 3	BUR; 5	MOT	9th	42
2019	NDDP by B-Max Racing	Nissan GT-R	GT500	OKA; 4‡	FUJ; 6	SUZ; 9	CHA; 6	FUJ; 11	AUT; 11	SUG; 1	MOT; DNS	9th	36

^{‡} Half points awarded as less than 75% of race distance was completed.

=== Complete 24 Hours of Le Mans results ===
Year	Team	Co-Drivers	Car	Class	Laps	Pos.	Class Pos.
2011	(France) Luxury Racing	(Monaco) Stéphane Ortelli (Brazil) Jaime Melo	Ferrari 458 Italia GTC	GTE; Pro	183	DNF	DNF
2012	(France) Luxury Racing	(Brazil) Jaime Melo (Germany) Dominik Farnbacher	Ferrari 458 Italia GTC	GTE; Pro	333	18th	**2nd**
2013	(United Kingdom) Aston Martin Racing	(Brazil) Bruno Senna (United Kingdom) Rob Bell	Aston Martin Vantage GTE	GTE; Pro	252	DNF	DNF
2014	(Germany) Porsche Team Manthey	(Germany) Marco Holzer (Austria) Richard Lietz	Porsche 911 RSR	GTE; Pro	337	15th	**3rd**
2015	(Germany) Porsche Team Manthey	(France) Patrick Pilet (Germany) Wolf Henzler	Porsche 911 RSR	GTE; Pro	14	DNF	DNF
2016	(Germany) Porsche Motorsport	(New Zealand) Earl Bamber (Germany) Jörg Bergmeister	Porsche 911 RSR	GTE; Pro	140	DNF	DNF
2017	(Germany) Porsche GT Team	(Austria) Richard Lietz (France) Patrick Pilet	Porsche 911 RSR	GTE; Pro	339	20th	4th
2018	(Germany) Porsche GT Team	(Austria) Richard Lietz (Italy) Gianmaria Bruni	Porsche 911 RSR	GTE; Pro	343	16th	**2nd**
2019	(Germany) Porsche GT Team	(Austria) Richard Lietz (Italy) Gianmaria Bruni	Porsche 911 RSR	GTE; Pro	342	21st	**2nd**
2020	(Germany) Porsche GT Team	(Austria) Richard Lietz (Italy) Gianmaria Bruni	Porsche 911 RSR-19	GTE; Pro	335	31st	5th
2021	(Germany) Porsche GT Team	(Austria) Richard Lietz (Italy) Gianmaria Bruni	Porsche 911 RSR-19	GTE; Pro	343	23rd	4th
2022	(Germany) Porsche GT Team	(Austria) Richard Lietz (Italy) Gianmaria Bruni	Porsche 911 RSR-19	GTE; Pro	350	28th	**1st**
2023	(Germany) Porsche Penske Motorsport	(United States) Dane Cameron (Denmark) Michael Christensen	Porsche 963	Hypercar	325	16th	9th
2024	(Germany) Porsche Penske Motorsport	(Australia) Matt Campbell (Denmark) Michael Christensen	Porsche 963	Hypercar	311	6th	6th
2025	(France) Alpine Endurance Team	(France) Jules Gounon (Germany) Mick Schumacher	Alpine A424	Hypercar	384	10th	10th
2026	(France) Alpine Endurance Team	(France) Jules Gounon (France) Victor Martins	Alpine A424	Hypercar	379	10th	10th

=== Complete 24 Hours of Spa results ===
Year	Team	Co-Drivers	Car	Class	Laps	Pos.	Class Pos.
2011	(France) Hexis AMR	(Netherlands) Stef Dusseldorp (Switzerland) Henri Moser	Aston Martin DBRS9	Pro	510	15th	9th
2018	(Germany) Manthey Racing	(France) Romain Dumas (Germany) Dirk Werner	Porsche 911 GT3 R (991)	Pro	493	29th	19th
2019	(Germany) Rowe Racing	(United Kingdom) Nick Tandy (France) Patrick Pilet	Porsche 911 GT3 R (991.2)	Pro	363	2nd	2nd
2020	(Germany) Frikadelli Racing Team	(Germany) Jörg Bergmeister (Norway) Dennis Olsen	Porsche 911 GT3 R (991.2)	Pro	527	8th	8th
2021	(Germany) Schnabl Engineering	(Denmark) Michael Christensen (Norway) Dennis Olsen	Porsche 911 GT3 R (991.2)	Pro	254	DNF	DNF
2023	(France) CLRT	(France) Hugo Chevalier (France) Clément Mateu (France) Steven Palette	Porsche 911 GT3 R (992)	Bronze	534	20th	4th
2024	(Germany) SSR Herberth	(Australia) Matt Campbell (France) Mathieu Jaminet	Porsche 911 GT3 R (992)	Pro	478	8th	7th
2026	(France) Schumacher CLRT	(Australia) Matt Campbell (Turkey) Ayhancan Güven	Porsche 911 GT3 R (992.2)	Pro	541	4th	4th

=== Complete FIA World Endurance Championship results ===
(key) (Races in bold indicate pole position) (Races in italics indicate fastest lap)

Year	Entrant	Class	Car	Engine	1	2	3	4	5	6	7	8	9	Rank	Points
2012	Luxury Racing	LMGTE Pro	Ferrari 458 Italia GT2	Ferrari 4.5 L V8	SEB; Ret	**SPA**; 3	**LMS**; 2	SIL	SÃO	BHR	FUJ	SHA		54th	3.5
2013	Aston Martin Racing	LMGTE Pro	Aston Martin Vantage GTE	Aston Martin 4.5 L V8	SIL; 3	SPA; 2	**LMS**; Ret	SÃO	**COA**; 1	**FUJ**; 1	SHA	BHR		9th	73.5
2014	Porsche Team Manthey	LMGTE Pro	Porsche 911 RSR	Porsche 4.0 L Flat-6	SIL; 1	SPA; 9	LMS; 2	COA; 2	FUJ; 11	SHA; 1	BHR; 5	SÃO; 2		2nd	134.5
2015	Porsche Team Manthey	LMGTE Pro	Porsche 911 RSR	Porsche 4.0 L Flat-6	SIL; 7	SPA; 2	LMS; Ret	NÜR; 2	COA; 2	FUJ; 2	SHA; 3	BHR; 1		5th	118
2017	Porsche GT Team	LMGTE Pro	Porsche 911 RSR	Porsche 4.0 L Flat-6	SIL; 3	SPA; 5	LMS; 3	NÜR; 2	MEX; 3	COA; 6	**FUJ**; 2	SHA; 2	BHR; 4	2nd	145
2018–19	Porsche GT Team	LMGTE Pro	Porsche 911 RSR	Porsche 4.0 L Flat-6	SPA	**LMS**; 2	SIL	FUJ	SHA	SEB	SPA	LMS; 2		11th	55
2019–20	Porsche GT Team	LMGTE Pro	Porsche 911 RSR-19	Porsche 4.2 L Flat-6	SIL	FUJ	SHA	BHR	COA	SPA	**LMS**; 9	BHR		30th	5
2021	Porsche GT Team	LMGTE Pro	Porsche 911 RSR-19	Porsche 4.2 L Flat-6	SPA	ALG; 4	MNZ	LMS; 3	BHR	BHR; 4				6th	66
2022	Porsche GT Team	LMGTE Pro	Porsche 911 RSR-19	Porsche 4.2 L Flat-6	SEB	SPA	LMS; 1	MNZ; 5	FUJ	BHR				7th	60
2023	Porsche Penske Motorsport	Hypercar	Porsche 963	Porsche 4.6 L Turbo V8	SEB; 5	ALG; 10	SPA; 4	LMS; 7	MNZ; 4	FUJ; 12	BHR; 7			7th	61
2024	Porsche Penske Motorsport	Hypercar	Porsche 963	Porsche 4.6 L Turbo V8	**QAT**; 3	IMO; 3	**SPA**; Ret	LMS; 6	SÃO; 3	COA; 7	FUJ; Ret	BHR; 2		5th	104
2025	Alpine Endurance Team	Hypercar	Alpine A424	Alpine V634 3.4 L Turbo V6	QAT; 13	IMO; 3	SPA; 3	LMS; 9	SÃO; 9	COA; 15	FUJ; 14	BHR; 12		16th	36
2026	Alpine Endurance Team	Hypercar	Alpine A424	Alpine V634 3.4 L Turbo V6	IMO; 11	SPA; 11	LMS; 9	SÃO; 11	COA; 5	FUJ	CAT	MNZ		19th	14

=== Complete IMSA SportsCar Championship results ===
(key) (Races in bold indicate pole position) (Races in italics indicate fastest lap)

Year	Entrant	Class	Chassis	Engine	1	2	3	4	5	6	7	8	9	10	11	Rank	Points	Ref
2014	CORE Autosport	GTLM	Porsche 911 RSR	Porsche 4.0 L Flat-6	DAY	SEB	LBH	LGA	WGL	MOS	IND	ELK	VIR	COA; 5	PET	31st	27	
2015	Porsche North America	GTLM	Porsche 911 RSR	Porsche 4.0 L Flat-6	DAY; 7	**SEB**; 7	LBH; 4	LGA	WGL	MOS	ELK	VIR	AUS	PET; 8		12th	103	
2016	Porsche North America	GTLM	Porsche 911 RSR	Porsche 4.0 L Flat-6	DAY; 3	SEB; 3	LBH; 7	LGA; 3	WGL; 10	MOS; 6	LIM; 8	ELK; 4	VIR; 3	COA; 1	PET; 5	4th	313	
2017	Porsche GT Team	GTLM	Porsche 911 RSR	Porsche 4.0 L Flat-6	DAY; 2	SEB; 7	LBH	AUS	WGL	MOS	LIM	ELK	VIR	LGA	PET	19th	57	
2018	Porsche GT Team	GTLM	Porsche 911 RSR	Porsche 4.0 L Flat-6	DAY; 8	SEB; 1	LBH	MOH	WGL	MOS	LIM	ELK	VIR	LGA	PET; 1	10th	93	
2019	Porsche GT Team	GTLM	Porsche 911 RSR	Porsche 4.0 L Flat-6	**DAY**; 5	**SEB**; 1	LBH	MDO	WGL	MOS	LIM	ELK	VIR	LGA	PET; 6	15th	86	
2020	Porsche GT Team	GTLM	Porsche 911 RSR-19	Porsche 4.2 L Flat-6	**DAY**; 3	DAY; 3	SEB; 6	ELK; 4	**VIR**; 3	**ATL**; 4	MDO	CLT; 5	PET; 1	LGA; 3	SEB; 1	5th	297	
2021	WeatherTech Racing	GTLM	Porsche 911 RSR-19	Porsche 4.2 L Flat-6	DAY	SEB	DET	WGL	WGL	LIM	ELK	LGA	LBH	VIR	PET; 2	11th	348	
2024	Wright Motorsports	GTD	Porsche 911 GT3 R (992)	Porsche 4.2 L Flat-6	DAY; 7						MOS		VIR			54th	252	
2024	Porsche Penske Motorsport	GTP	Porsche 963	Porsche 9RD 4.6 L V8		SEB; 9	LBH	LGA	DET	WGL		ELK		IMS	PET	35th	241	

=== Complete 24 Hours of Nürburgring results ===
Year	Team	Co-Drivers	Car	Class	Laps	Pos.	Class Pos.
2016	(Germany) Manthey Racing	(Germany) Jörg Bergmeister (Denmark) Michael Christensen (Austria) Richard Lietz	Porsche 911 GT3 R (991)	SP9	100	DNF	DNF
2017	(Germany) Manthey Racing	(France) Romain Dumas (Austria) Richard Lietz (France) Patrick Pilet	Porsche 911 GT3 R (991)	SP9	27	DNF	DNF
2018	(Germany) Manthey Racing	(Austria) Richard Lietz (France) Patrick Pilet (United Kingdom) Nick Tandy	Porsche 911 GT3 R (991)	SP9	135	1st	1st
2019	(Germany) Manthey Racing	(Austria) Richard Lietz (France) Patrick Pilet (United Kingdom) Nick Tandy	Porsche 911 GT3 R (991.2)	SP9	61	DNF	DNF
2021	(Germany) Frikadelli Racing Team	(Belgium) Maxime Martin (Norway) Dennis Olsen (France) Patrick Pilet	Porsche 911 GT3 R (991.2)	SP9	54	DNF	DNF
2022	(Germany) Manthey Racing	(Denmark) Michael Christensen (France) Kévin Estre (Belgium) Laurens Vanthoor	Porsche 911 GT3 R (991.2)	SP9	22	DNF	DNF
2023	(Germany) Manthey EMA	(Denmark) Michael Christensen (France) Kévin Estre (Austria) Thomas Preining	Porsche 911 GT3 R (992)	SP9	62	DNF	DNF

Sporting positions
Preceded by Renaud Derlot	Porsche Carrera Cup France; Champion; 2010	Succeeded by Kévin Estre
