= Jules Gounon =

French racing driver

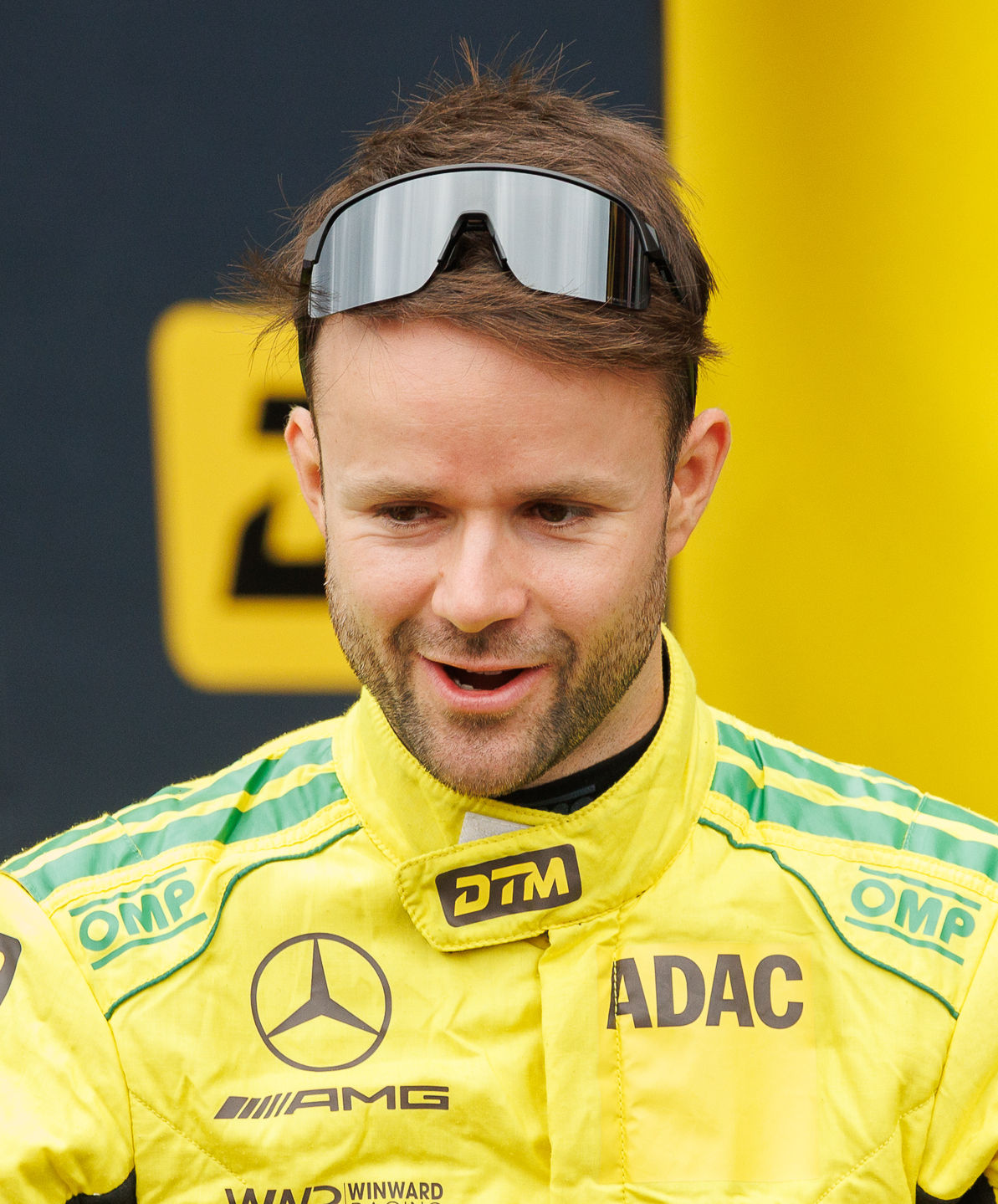
- Gounon in 2026
- Nationality: (France) French (Andorra) Andorran (Note: Gounon is a French citizen living in Andorra. Since 2023, he has represented both France and Andorra internationally.)
- Born: Jules Jean-Louis Gounon; 31 December 1994 (age 31) Aubenas, France
- Relatives: Jean-Marc Gounon (father)

GT World Challenge Europe Endurance Cup career
- Debut season: 2017
- Current team: Mercedes-AMG AKKodis ASP
- Categorisation: FIA Silver (until 2017); FIA Gold (2018–2021); FIA Platinum (2022–)
- Car number: 88
- Starts: 33 (33 entries)
- Wins: 6
- Podiums: 12
- Poles: 5
- Fastest laps: 4
- Best finish: 1st in 2022, 2023

Previous series
- 2016–17 2015 2014 2014 2013: ADAC GT Masters; Porsche Carrera Cup France; Eurocup Formula Renault 2.0; Formula Renault 2.0 NEC; French F4 Championship

Championship titles
- 2017, 2022 2017 2023: 24 Hours of Spa; ADAC GT Masters; Intercontinental GT Challenge

Jules Jean-Louis Gounon (born 31 December 1994 in Aubenas) is an Andorran-based French professional racing driver. A former Bentley factory driver, he currently competes in the FIA World Endurance Championship for Alpine and in various GT racing series for Mercedes-AMG. He is best known for his victories in the 24 Hours of Spa in 2017 and 2022, and the Bathurst 12 Hour in 2020, 2022 and 2023.

== Career ==
=== 1994–2015: Youth in karting, single-seaters and Porsche Carrera Cup ===
Gounon started karting in 2010 at the age of 15. He was crowned Rotax National French Champion in 2011. In the year after, he clinched the X30 world title. He was promoted to single-seaters, joining the French F4 Championship for the 2013 season and finished second with six wins. He competed one year in Formula Renault 2.0, but failed to impress as he "could not get on well with the team". As his career seemed to be in a deadlock after a difficult 2014 season, with him being forced to work as a car cleaner for a time, Gounon took part in the "Espoir Porsche Carrera Cup France 2015" scholarship thanks to a €1,500 gift from his grandfather; he ended up winning the shootout to take part in Porsche Carrera Cup France for the next season with a grant of €30,000. He scored his maiden win in the championship in Val de Vienne and finished sixth in the final standings.

=== 2016–2017: Success in German GT and win in the 24 Hours of Spa ===
In 2016, Gounon joined Callaway Competition in ADAC GT Masters, the German championship of GT. He drove a brand new Corvette C7 GT3-R with his teammate Daniel Keilwitz. Callaway ran three Corvette for this season. He won three times and put himself in title contention for the last event. However, Jules Gounon suffered a big crash at Hockenheim, staying conscious and alert, but with an injured (although not broken) left leg. Finally he stood third in the final standings while developing his new car during the year. Callaway Competition decided to run only the car of Gounon and Keilwitz for the 2017 season. He scored his first win of the season in Red Bull Ring. After this round, his teammate Keilwitz got injured and was replaced by Renger van der Zande who won with Gounon in Zandvoort, letting the Frenchman take alone the championship's lead. He then had two difficult weekends without podium with Albert Costa and van der Zande. However, he won his third race of the season in Hockenheim after the return of Keilwitz to competition. This last win let him seal the title in the last event. He also clinched the Junior title for drivers under 25.

Also engaged with Jean-Luc Beaubelique and Nico Bastian in Blancpain GT Series Endurance Cup (Pro-Am Cup), Gounon took two podiums. He was recruited by Audi Sport Team Saintéloc for the 2017 24 Hours of Spa, the greatest race of GT, teaming up with Christopher Haase and Markus Winkelhock. Despite running one lap down in the first half of the race because of a mis-threaded wheel, Gounon and his teammates came back in front. He battled with a Bentley in the last hours and created an 11-second gap with it to win the biggest victory in his career. This 2017 edition was very tight as six cars arrived in the same lap as the leader.

=== 2018–2020: Official factory driver for Bentley ===
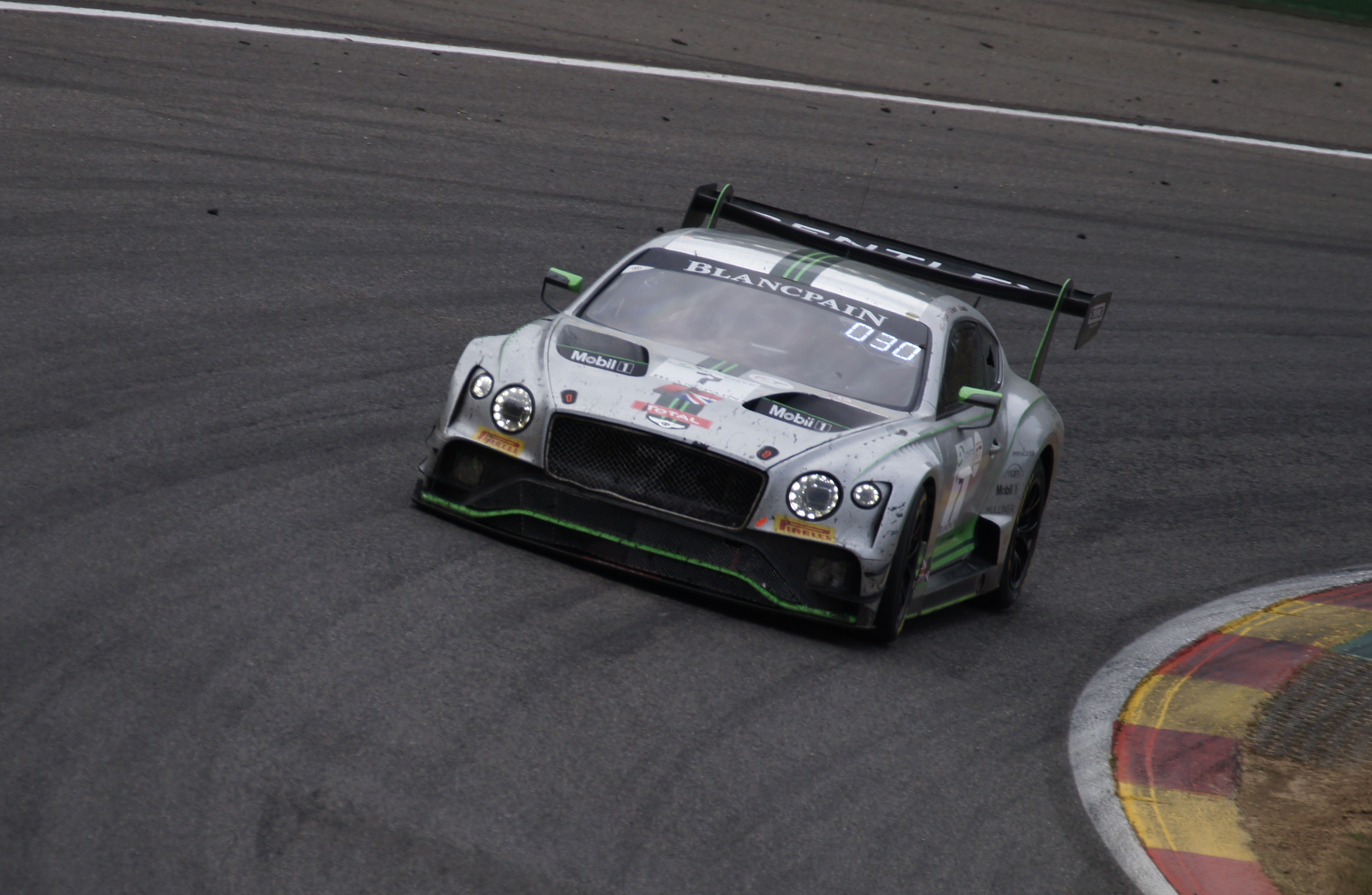
Bentley Continental GT3 during the 2018 24 Hours of Spa

In 2018, Gounon, at the age of 23, was signed by Bentley M-Sport as an official factory driver for Blancpain GT Series Endurance Cup and Intercontinental GT Challenge, replacing Oliver Jarvis. With Steven Kane and Guy Smith, the Frenchman had to develop the new Bentley Continental GT3 which replaced the former generation. In Paul Ricard, he scored his maiden podium with Bentley finishing second. He missed the win because of a bonnet problem. For the 2018 24 Hours of Spa, he had to leave the race after some braking problems. He also did a one-off in Super GT for the Fuji 500-mile race. He finished thirteenth which represented the best result of the team that season in the Japanese championship. Gounon said about that 2018 season: "I have progressed and learnt a lot. [...] I had to get used with a new car. The target was to have a good car at the end of the season. Unfortunately, we had a lack of speed in straight lines. With this new Continental GT3, Bentley started again from the beginning. 2018 was a season of development. After more than two years of work with German people, I discovered another vision of motorsport with a different way of working. The Bentley Continental GT3 will have a say in 2019".

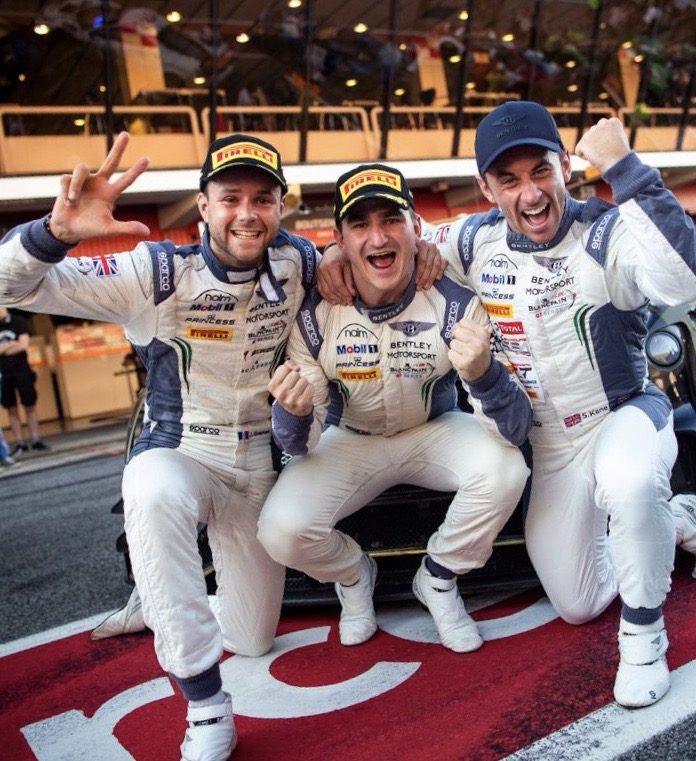
Gounon (left) celebrating his 2019 3H Barcelona win alongside teammates Jordan Pepper (middle) and Steven Kane (right)

For the centenary of Bentley in 2019, Gounon was engaged in Blancpain GT Series Endurance Cup and Intercontinental GT Challenge with Steven Kane and Jordan Pepper. After two complicated races, he set the fastest time of the qualifying session in Paul Ricard, faster than his teammates and than his rivals. Battling with the Ferrari 488 GT3 of Miguel Molina, Gounon and Bentley won their first race of the year and also their first win since the introduction of their new car back in 2018. Two weeks later, Gounon participated in his first 24 Hours of Le Mans with Risi Competizione, teaming up with Oliver Jarvis and Pipo Derani on a Ferrari 488 GTE Evo. They qualified 17th in the category LMGTE Pro, and finished 11th in this category and 40th overall, despite a mechanical problem in the last hours of the race.

=== 2021–present: GT World Challenge success with Mercedes ===
==== 2021 ====
2021 would see Gounon become a works driver for the Mercedes team, as he took part in the GT World Challenge Europe Endurance Cup with Daniel Juncadella and Raffaele Marciello. A strong start with a podium in Monza and a sixth place in Le Castellet was followed by disappointment at Spa, where the outfit was forced to retire, having previously taken pole position. The team ended their campaign positively, appearing on the rostrum in the final two races, which included a win at the season finale, ultimately putting Gounon second overall.

==== 2022 ====
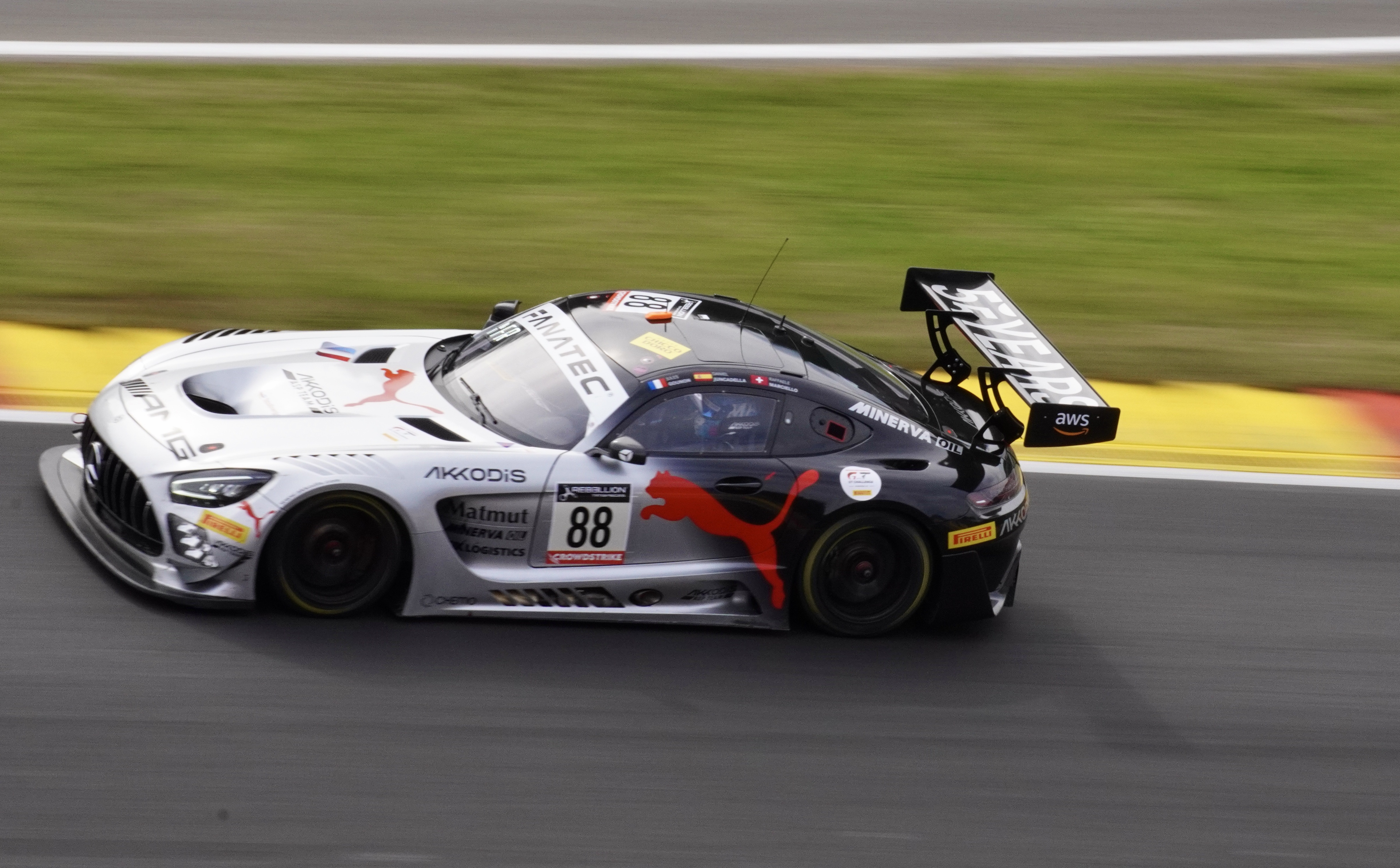
Gounon's Mercedes AMG GT3 during the 2022 24 Hours of Spa

Gounon teamed up with Juncadella and Marciello once more at the rebranded AKKodis ASP Team for the 2022 season of the Endurance Cup. Having taken the overall victory at the 24 Hours of Spa, the Frenchman and his teammates ended up winning the championship at the end of the year, beating out Antonio Fuoco by a mere two points.

During the same year, Gounon raced in the ADAC GT Masters alongside junior driver Fabian Schiller. The pair finished third in the standings, amassing four wins and a further podium.

==== 2023 ====
Having switched to an Andorran racing license at the start of 2023, Gounon began the campaign in fine style, grabbing a class victory at the 24 Hours of Daytona and following that up by winning the Bathurst 12 Hour race outright for a record-breaking third year in a row, despite racing alongside an amateur driver in the form of Kenny Habul. Gounon later apologised to fellow Mercedes-AMG driver Maro Engel, with whom he had collided merely half an hour before the finish.

The season would contain campaigns in three championships: the GTWC Europe Endurance Cup, where Gounon and Marciello would attempt to defend their title alongside Timur Boguslavskiy, the GTD Pro class in IMSA, which the Frenchman contested alongside Juncadella for WeatherTech Racing, and the British GT Championship as Ian Loggie's teammate. Despite a retirement in the Endurance Cup season opener at Monza, Gounon would be able to retain the title, with wins at Le Castellet and the Nürburgring sandwiching a runner-up finish at the 24 Hours of Spa. Over in America, Gounon, together with Juncadella, Maro Engel and Cooper MacNeil, won the 24 Hours of Daytona at the start of the year. Gounon and Juncadella combined for a further three victories that season, including a triumph at the season-ending Petit Le Mans race, which earned them second in the drivers' standings and the title in the Michelin Endurance Cup. The British series proved to be less fruitful, as the Gounon scored a lone win at Oulton Park and finished sixth in the drivers' championship, having missed one race.

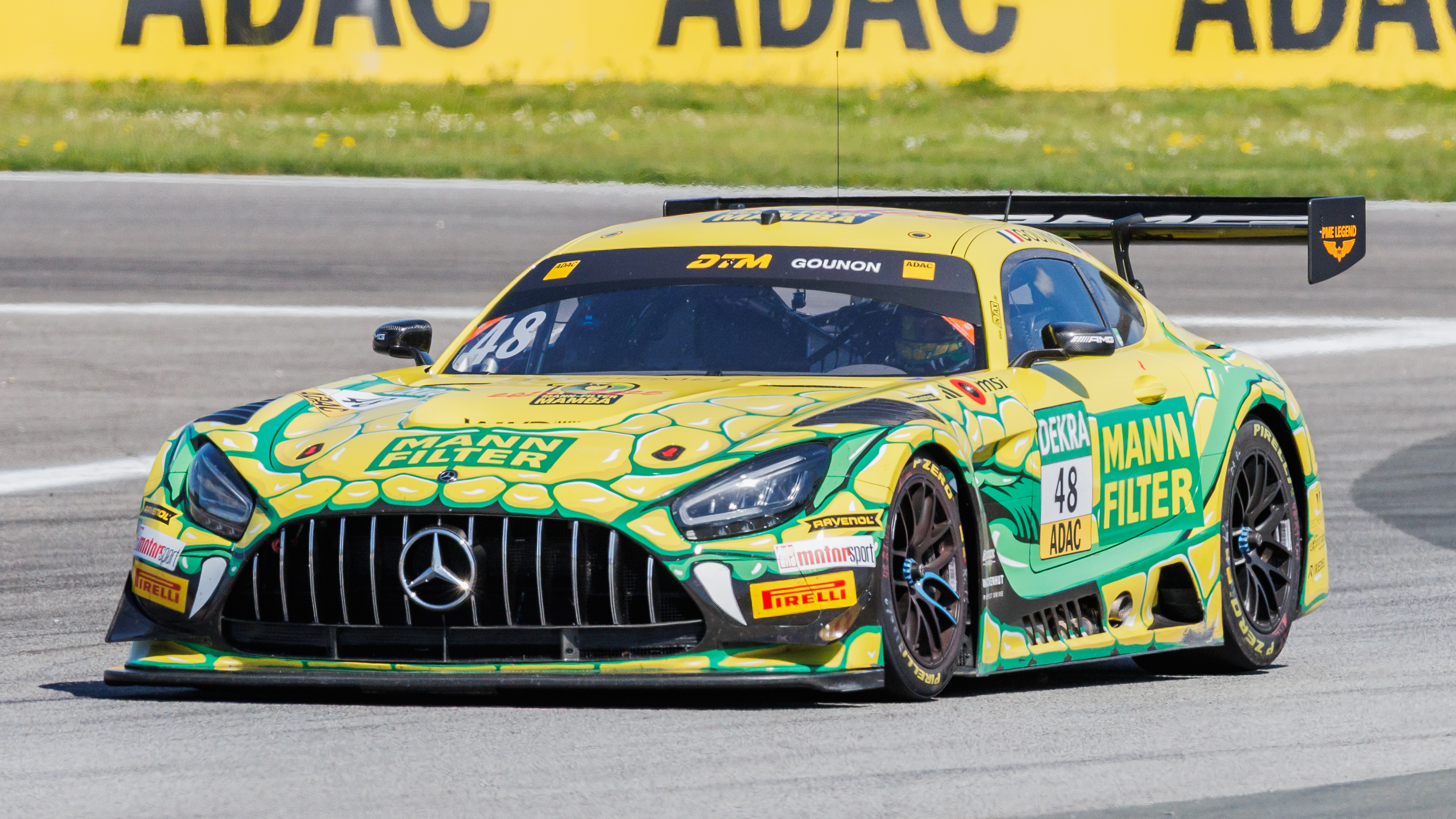
Gounon at Motorsport Arena Oschersleben in 2025

Throughout the year, Gounon took part in the full calendar of the Intercontinental GT Challenge. With a victory at Bathurst, third places at Kyalami and Abu Dhabi and runner-up finishes in Spa and Indianapolis, Gounon would clinch the title, having completed a podium sweep whilst racing with four different Mercedes-affiliated teams.

== Personal life ==
Gounon is the son of the former racing driver Jean-Marc Gounon, who finished second in the 24 Hours of Le Mans in 1997 and raced in Formula One with Minardi and Simtek. The Frenchman was previously in a relationship with WEC driver Michelle Gatting since 2022, but since 2026 has been in a relationship with World Champion triathlete Kate Waugh.

Gounon is a resident of Andorra. In 2023, after living in the country for two years, he applied for an Andorran racing licence.

== Racing record ==
=== Racing career summary ===
Season	Series	Team	Races	Wins	Poles	F/Laps	Podiums	Points	Position
2013	French F4 Championship	Auto Sport Academy	20	6	0	1	9	236.5	**2nd**
2014	Eurocup Formula Renault 2.0	KTR	2	0	0	0	0	0	30th
2014	Eurocup Formula Renault 2.0	AVF	2	0	0	0	0	0	30th
2014	Formula Renault 2.0 NEC	KTR	2	0	0	0	0	54	23rd
2014	Formula Renault 2.0 NEC	AVF	8	0	0	0	0	54	23rd
2015	Porsche Carrera Cup France	Martinet by Alméras	11	1	1	1	4	125	6th
2016	ADAC GT Masters	Callaway Competition	14	3	1	0	4	152	**3rd**
2016	Blancpain GT Series Endurance Cup	Konrad Motorsport	4	0	0	0	0	0	NC
2016	24H Series - SPX	Spark Motorsport	1	0	0	0	0	0	NC†
2016	24H Series - CUP1	Sorg Rennsport	1	0	0	0	0	0	NC
2017	ADAC GT Masters	Callaway Competition	14	3	3	2	6	174	**1st**
2017	Blancpain GT Series Endurance Cup	AKKA ASP	4	0	0	0	0	28	11th
2017	Blancpain GT Series Endurance Cup	Audi Sport Team Saintéloc	1	1	0	1	1	28	11th
2017	Blancpain GT Series Sprint Cup	AKKA ASP	8	0	0	0	0	0	NC
2017	Blancpain GT Series Asia	Craft-Bamboo Racing	2	0	0	0	0	12	26th
2017	IMSA SportsCar Championship - GTD	Montaplast by Land-Motorsport	2	0	0	0	1	40	6th
2017	Intercontinental GT Challenge	Audi Sport Team Saintéloc	1	1	0	1	1	25	6th
2017	Intercontinental GT Challenge	RealTime Racing	1	0	0	0	0	25	6th
2017	24H Series - A6	Konrad Motorsport	1	0	0	0	0	0	NC†
2018	Blancpain GT Series Endurance Cup	Bentley Team M-Sport	5	0	0	0	1	29	14th
2018	Intercontinental GT Challenge	Bentley Team M-Sport	4	0	0	1	0	4	23rd
2018	Super GT Series - GT300	EIcars Bentley	1	0	0	0	0	0	NC
2019	Blancpain GT Series Endurance Cup	Bentley Team M-Sport	5	1	1	0	2	49	4th
2019	Intercontinental GT Challenge	Bentley Team M-Sport	5	0	0	0	0	10	25th
2019	International GT Open	Petri Corse	1	0	0	0	0	0	39th
2019	24 Hours of Le Mans - GTE Pro	Risi Competizione	1	0	0	0	0	N/A	11th
2020	GT World Challenge Europe Endurance Cup	Bentley K-PAX Racing	4	0	0	0	0	6	23rd
2020	GT World Challenge Europe Sprint Cup	CMR	8	0	0	1	1	22.5	13th
2020	IMSA SportsCar Championship - GTD	Meyer Shank Racing with Curb-Agajanian	1	0	0	0	0	21	49th
2020	Intercontinental GT Challenge	Bentley Team M-Sport	2	1	0	0	1	28	7th
2020	Intercontinental GT Challenge	K-PAX Racing	2	0	0	0	0	28	7th
2020	24 Hours of Le Mans - GTE Pro	Risi Competizione	1	0	0	0	0	N/A	4th
2020	Nürburgring Endurance Series - V6	Team Mathol Racing e.V.	1	1	0	0	1	8.33	5th
2020	Nürburgring Endurance Series - SP9	Phoenix Racing	1	0	0	0	0	5.21	73rd
2020	24 Hours of Nürburgring - SP9	Phoenix Racing	1	0	0	0	0	N/A	DNF
2021	ADAC GT Masters	Team Zakspeed Mobil Krankenkasse Racing	14	2	2	2	2	136	6th
2021	GT World Challenge Europe Endurance Cup	AKKA ASP Team	5	1	1	0	3	79	**2nd**
2021	GT World Challenge Europe Sprint Cup	AKKA ASP Team	10	0	0	0	2	35.5	7th
2021	IMSA SportsCar Championship - GTLM	Risi Competizione	2	0	0	1	0	308	13th
2021	Intercontinental GT Challenge	Mercedes-AMG Team AKKA ASP	1	1	1	0	0	25	10th
2021	Intercontinental GT Challenge	Mercedes-AMG Team Craft-Bamboo Racing	1	0	0	0	0	25	10th
2021	Nürburgring Langstrecken-Serie - SP9	Mercedes-AMG Team GetSpeed	1	0	0	0	0	0	NC†
2021	24 Hours of Nürburgring - SP9	Mercedes-AMG Team GetSpeed	1	0	0	0	0	N/A	7th
2022	ADAC GT Masters	Drago Racing Team zvo	14	4	0	0	5	153	**3rd**
2022	British GT Championship - GT3	Ram Racing	4	1	1	0	4	92.5	5th
2022	GT World Challenge Europe Endurance Cup	AKKodis ASP Team	5	1	1	1	3	89	**1st**
2022	GT World Challenge Europe Sprint Cup	AKKodis ASP Team	6	0	0	1	2	41.5	7th
2022	IMSA SportsCar Championship - GTD Pro	WeatherTech Racing	2	0	0	1	1	542	19th
2022	IMSA SportsCar Championship - GTD	WeatherTech Racing	2	0	0	1	0	533	39th
2022	Intercontinental GT Challenge	SunEnergy1 Racing by Triple Eight	1	1	0	0	1	65	**2nd**
2022	Intercontinental GT Challenge	Mercedes-AMG Team AKKodis ASP	1	1	1	0	1	65	**2nd**
2022	Intercontinental GT Challenge	Winward Racing	1	0	1	0	1	65	**2nd**
2022	Intercontinental GT Challenge	Mercedes-AMG GruppeM Racing	1	0	0	0	0	65	**2nd**
2022	24H GT Series - GT3	SunEnergy1 by SPS automotive performance	1	0	0	0	1	0	NC†
2022	24 Hours of Nürburgring - SP9	Mercedes-AMG Team GetSpeed BWT	1	0	0	0	1	N/A	**3rd**
2022–23	Middle East Trophy - GT3	Abu Dhabi Racing by HRT Bilstein	1	0	0	0	0	0	NC†
2023	Asian Le Mans Series - GT	HubAuto Racing	4	0	2	0	0	12	12th
2023	British GT Championship - GT3	2 Seas Motorsport	8	1	1	0	3	122.5	6th
2023	GT World Challenge Europe Endurance Cup	AKKodis ASP Team	5	2	2	1	3	104	**1st**
2023	IMSA SportsCar Championship - GTD Pro	WeatherTech Racing	11	4	1	2	6	3648	**2nd**
2023	Intercontinental GT Challenge	SunEnergy1 Racing	2	1	0	0	2	91	**1st**
2023	Intercontinental GT Challenge	AKKodis ASP Team	1	0	0	0	1	91	**1st**
2023	Intercontinental GT Challenge	Mercedes-AMG Craft-Bamboo Racing	1	0	0	0	1	91	**1st**
2023	Intercontinental GT Challenge	Mercedes-AMG Team 2 Seas	1	0	0	0	1	91	**1st**
2023	Nürburgring Langstrecken-Serie - SP9	Mercedes-AMG Team GetSpeed	1	0	0	0	0	0	NC†
2023	24 Hours of Nürburgring - SP9	Mercedes-AMG Team GetSpeed	1	0	0	0	0	N/A	DNF
2023	FIA GT World Cup	Climax Racing	1	0	0	0	0	N/A	14th
2023–24	Asian Le Mans Series - GT	Craft-Bamboo Racing	2	0	1	0	0	5	27th
2024	GT World Challenge Europe Endurance Cup	Mercedes-AMG Team GetSpeed	5	0	0	0	1	24	13th
2024	24 Hours of Nürburgring - SP9	Mercedes-AMG Team GetSpeed	1	0	0	0	0	N/A	DNF
2024	Nürburgring Langstrecken-Serie - SP9	Mercedes-AMG Team GetSpeed	2	0	0	0	0	*	*
2024	Nürburgring Langstrecken-Serie - SP9	Mercedes-AMG Team Landgraf						*	*
2024	GT World Challenge Europe Sprint Cup	Boutsen VDS	9	1	1	1	3	35.5	7th
2024	Intercontinental GT Challenge	SunEnergy1	1	0	0	0	1	18*	*
2024	Intercontinental GT Challenge	Mercedes-AMG Team GetSpeed	2	0	0	0	0	18*	*
2024	GT World Challenge Asia	Climax Racing	4	1	1	0	1	35	19th
2024	IMSA SportsCar Championship - GTD Pro	SunEnergy1 Racing	1	0	0	0	0	201*	35th*
2024	FIA World Endurance Championship - Hypercar	Alpine Endurance Team	2	0	0	0	0	0*	24th*
2024	Deutsche Tourenwagen Masters	Mercedes-AMG Team HRT	2	0	0	1	0	10	21st
2024	GT World Challenge America - Pro	Mercedes-AMG Team GruppeM Racing	1	0	0	0	1	0	NC†
2024	FIA GT World Cup	Mercedes-AMG Craft-Bamboo Racing	1	0	0	0	0	N/A	19th
2024	Gulf 12 Hours	2 Seas – Grove Racing	1	0	0	0	0	N/A	17th
2024–25	Asian Le Mans Series - GT	Winward Racing	2	1	0	0	1	35	7th
2025	Deutsche Tourenwagen Masters	Mercedes-AMG Team Mann-filter	16	0	1	1	3	142	9th
2025	FIA World Endurance Championship - Hypercar	Alpine Endurance Team	8	0	0	0	2	36	16th
2025	IMSA SportsCar Championship - GTD Pro	75 Express	1	0	0	0	0	182	NC†
2025	Intercontinental GT Challenge	75 Express	1	0	0	0	1	15	23rd
2025	Intercontinental GT Challenge	Mercedes-AMG Team Lone Star Racing	1	0	1	0	0	15	23rd
2025	Intercontinental GT Challenge	Mercedes-AMG Team GetSpeed	1	0	0	0	0	15	23rd
2025	GT World Challenge Europe Endurance Cup	Mercedes-AMG Team GetSpeed	5	0	1	1	0	15	14th
2025	Gulf 12 Hours	Grove Racing by GetSpeed	1	0	0	0	1	N/A	**3rd**
2025–26	24H Series Middle East - GT3	Grove Racing by GetSpeed	1	0	0	0	0	0	NC†
2026	IMSA SportsCar Championship - GTD Pro	Bartone Bros with GetSpeed	1	0	0	0	0	225	41st
2026	Deutsche Tourenwagen Masters	Mercedes-AMG Team Mann-Filter	16	0	1	0	1	111	10th
2026	GT World Challenge Europe Endurance Cup	Mercedes-AMG Team Verstappen Racing	4	0	0	0	1	21	11th
2026	GT World Challenge Europe Sprint Cup	Mercedes-AMG Team Verstappen Racing	4	1	2	0	2	32.5	8th
2026	Nürburgring Langstrecken-Serie - SP9	Mercedes-AMG Team Verstappen Racing							
2026	24 Hours of Nürburgring - SP9	Mercedes-AMG Team Verstappen Racing	1	0	0	0	0	N/A	19th
2026	Intercontinental GT Challenge	Mercedes-AMG Team Verstappen Racing	2	0	1	0	0	8	26th
2026	Intercontinental GT Challenge	75 Express	1	0	0	0	0	8	26th
2026	FIA World Endurance Championship - Hypercar	Alpine Endurance Team	8	0	1	0	2	54	13th

=== Complete French F4 Championship results ===
(key) (Races in bold indicate pole position) (Races in italics indicate fastest lap)

Year	1	2	3	4	5	6	7	8	9	10	11	12	13	14	15	16	17	18	19	20	21	DC	Points
2013	LMS; 1; 6	LMS; 2 Ret	LMS; 3; 2	PAU; 1; 8	PAU; 2; 1	PAU; 3; 9	SPA; 1; 5	SPA; 2; 17†	SPA; 3 DNS	VDV; 1; 8	VDV; 2; 4	VDV; 3; 11	MAG; 1; 1	MAG; 2; 1	MAG; 3; 1	LÉD; 1; 1	LÉD; 2; 14	LÉD; 3; 1	LEC; 1; 3	LEC; 2; 2	LEC; 3; 7	2nd	236.5

=== Complete Formula Renault 2.0 NEC results ===
(key) (Races in bold indicate pole position) (Races in italics indicate fastest lap)

Year	Entrant	1	2	3	4	5	6	7	8	9	10	11	12	13	14	15	16	17	DC	Points
2014	KTR	MNZ; 1 Ret	MNZ; 2; 14																23rd	54
2014	AVF			SIL; 1	SIL; 2	HOC; 1	HOC; 2	HOC; 3	SPA; 1; 15	SPA; 2; 11	ASS; 1; 14	ASS; 2 DSQ	MST; 1; 20	MST; 2; 25	MST; 3 C	NÜR; 1; 10	NÜR; 2; 9	NÜR; 3 C	23rd	54

=== Complete Eurocup Formula Renault 2.0 results ===
(key) (Races in bold indicate pole position; races in italics indicate fastest lap)

Year	Entrant	1	2	3	4	5	6	7	8	9	10	11	12	13	14	DC	Points
2014	KTR	ALC; 1; 25	ALC; 2; 26	SPA; 1	SPA; 2	MSC; 1	MSC; 2	NÜR; 1	NÜR; 2	HUN; 1	HUN; 2					30th	0
2014	AVF											LEC; 1 Ret	LEC; 2 Ret	JER; 1	JER; 2	30th	0

=== Complete Porsche Carrera Cup France results ===
(key) (Races in bold indicate pole position) (Races in italics indicate fastest lap)

Year	Team	1	2	3	4	5	6	7	8	9	10	11	12	13	DC	Points
2015	Martinet by Alméras	LÉD; 1; 3	LÉD; 2 C	LMS; 1; 7	LMS; 2; 6	VDV; 1; 1	**VDV**; **2**; 6	MAG; 1; 3	MAG; 2; 2	NAV; 1 DSQ	NAV; 2 DSQ	NAV; 3 DNS	LEC; 1; 5	LEC; 2; 5	6th	125

=== Complete ADAC GT Masters results ===
(key) (Races in bold indicate pole position) (Races in italics indicate fastest lap)

Year	Team	Car	1	2	3	4	5	6	7	8	9	10	11	12	13	14	DC	Points
2016	Callaway Competition	Corvette C7 GT3-R	OSC; 1; 7	OSC; 2 Ret	SAC; 1; 4	SAC; 2; 1	LAU; 1; 4	LAU; 2; 1	RBR; 1; 3	**RBR**; **2**; 1	NÜR; 1; 5	NÜR; 2 Ret	ZAN; 1; 8	ZAN; 2; 5	HOC; 1; 6	HOC; 2 Ret	3rd	152
2017	Callaway Competition	Corvette C7 GT3-R	OSC; 1 Ret	OSC; 2; 2	LAU; 1; 5	LAU; 2; 4	**RBR**; **1**; 1	RBR; 2; 3	**ZAN**; **1**; 1	ZAN; 2; 6	NÜR; 1; 5	NÜR; 2; 8	SAC; 1; 8	SAC; 2 Ret	**HOC**; **1**; 1	HOC; 2; 2	1st	174
2021	Team Zakspeed Mobil Krankenkasse Racing	Mercedes-AMG GT3 Evo	OSC; 1; 15	OSC; 2; 4	RBR; 1; 13	RBR; 2; 8	ZAN; 1; 8	ZAN; 2; 5	LAU; 1 Ret	**LAU**; **2**; 1	SAC; 1; 9	**SAC**; **2**; 1	HOC; 1; 10	HOC; 2; 5	NÜR; 1; 19	NÜR; 2; 6	6th	136
2022	Drago Racing Team zvo	Mercedes-AMG GT3 Evo	OSC; 1; 13	OSC; 2; 1^{2}	RBR; 1; 12	RBR; 2; 12	ZAN; 1 Ret	ZAN; 2; 7	NÜR; 1; 3^{2}	NÜR; 2; 1^{3}	LAU; 1; 17	LAU; 2; 10	SAC; 1; 1^{2}	SAC; 2 Ret	HOC; 1; 16^{3}	HOC; 2; 1^{3}	3rd	153

=== Complete GT World Challenge Europe results ===
==== GT World Challenge Europe Endurance Cup ====
(key) (Races in bold indicate pole position) (Races in italics indicate fastest lap)

Year	Team	Car	Class	1	2	3	4	5	6	7	Pos.	Points
2016	Konrad Motorsport	Lamborghini Huracán GT3	Pro	MNZ; Ret	SIL; 24	LEC					NC	0
2016	Konrad Motorsport	Lamborghini Huracán GT3	Pro-Am				SPA; 6H; 28	SPA; 12H; 29	SPA; 24H; 30	NÜR; 27	37th	6
2017	AKKA ASP	Mercedes-AMG GT3	Pro-Am	MNZ; 17	**SIL**; 22	LEC; 15				**CAT**; 36	9th	46
2017	Audi Sport Team Saintéloc	Audi R8 LMS	Pro				SPA; 6H; 7	SPA; 12H; 13	SPA; 24H; 1		11th	28
2018	Bentley Team M-Sport	Bentley Continental GT3	Pro	MNZ; 24	SIL; 21	LEC; 2	SPA; 6H; 11	SPA; 12H; 5	SPA; 24H; 25	CAT; 21	14th	29
2019	Bentley Team M-Sport	Bentley Continental GT3	Pro	MNZ; 12	SIL; 12	**LEC**; 1	SPA; 6H; 16	SPA; 12H; 28	SPA; 24H; 49	CAT; 3	4th	49
2020	Bentley K-PAX Racing	Bentley Continental GT3	Pro	IMO; 30	NÜR; Ret	SPA; 6H; 10	SPA; 12H; 5	SPA; 24H; 10	LEC; Ret		23rd	6
2021	AKKA ASP Team	Mercedes-AMG GT3 Evo	Pro	MNZ; 2	LEC; 6	SPA; 6H; 8	SPA; 12H; 4	**SPA**; **24H**; Ret	NÜR; 2	CAT; 1	2nd	79
2022	AKKodis ASP Team	Mercedes-AMG GT3 Evo	Pro	IMO; 2	LEC; 3	SPA; 6H; 3	SPA; 12H; 3	**SPA**; **24H**; 1	HOC; 40†	CAT; 5	1st	89
2023	AKKodis ASP Team	Mercedes-AMG GT3 Evo	Pro	MNZ; Ret	LEC; 1	SPA; 6H; 3	SPA; 12H; 2	**SPA**; **24H**; 2	**NÜR**; 1	CAT; 5	1st	104
2024	Mercedes-AMG Team GetSpeed	Mercedes-AMG GT3 Evo	Pro	LEC; 3	SPA; 6H; 24	SPA; 12H; 5	SPA; 24H; Ret	NÜR; 12	MNZ; Ret	JED; 8	13th	24
2025	Mercedes-AMG Team GetSpeed	Mercedes-AMG GT3 Evo	Pro	LEC; 13	**MNZ**; 48†	SPA; 6H; 1	SPA; 12H; 60†	SPA; 24H; Ret	NÜR; 22	CAT; 14	14th	15
2026	Mercedes-AMG Team Verstappen Racing	Mercedes-AMG GT3 Evo	Pro	LEC; 9	MNZ; Ret	SPA; 6H; 10	SPA; 12H; 6	SPA; 24H; Ret	NÜR; 3	ALG	11th	21

^{*}Season still in progress.

==== GT World Challenge Europe Sprint Cup ====
(key) (Races in bold indicate pole position) (Races in italics indicate fastest lap)

Year	Team	Car	Class	1	2	3	4	5	6	7	8	9	10	Pos.	Points
2017	AKKA ASP	Mercedes-AMG GT3	Pro-Am	**MIS**; **QR**; Ret	MIS; CR; 26	**BRH**; **QR**; 22	BRH; CR; 23	ZOL; QR; 23	ZOL; CR; 22	**HUN**; **QR**; 27	HUN; CR; 21	NÜR; QR	NÜR; CR	5th	69
2020	CMR	Bentley Continental GT3	Pro	MIS; 1; 3	MIS; 2; 8	MIS; 3; 18	MAG; 1 Ret	MAG; 2; 10	ZAN; 1; 5	ZAN; 2; 6	CAT; 1; 21	CAT; 2 DNS	CAT; 3 DNS	13th	22.5
2022	AKKodis ASP Team	Mercedes-AMG GT3 Evo	Pro	BRH; 1; 4	BRH; 2; 3	MAG; 1	MAG; 2	ZAN; 1; 2	ZAN; 2; 4	MIS; 1; 10	MIS; 2; 6	VAL; 1	VAL; 2	7th	41.5
2024	Boutsen VDS	Mercedes-AMG GT3 Evo	Pro	BRH; 1 DNS	BRH; 2; 3	MIS; 1; 9	MIS; 2; 9	HOC; 1; 12	HOC; 2; 4	MAG; 1; 19	**MAG**; **2**; 3	CAT; 1; 1	CAT; 2; 5	7th	35.5
2026	Mercedes-AMG Team Verstappen Racing	Mercedes-AMG GT3 Evo	Pro	BRH; 1	BRH; 2	MIS; 1 Ret	**MIS**; **2**; 2	**MAG**; **1**; 1	MAG; 2; 8	ZAN; 1	ZAN; 2	CAT; 1	CAT; 2	8th	32.5

^{*}Season still in progress.

=== Complete Super GT results ===
(key) (Races in bold indicate pole position; races in italics indicate fastest lap; small number denotes the finishing position)

Year	Team	Car	Class	1	2	3	4	5	6	7	8	DC	Points
2018	EIcars Bentley	Bentley Continental GT3	GT300	OKA	FUJ	SUZ	CHA	FUJ; 13	SUG	AUT	MOT	NC	0

=== Complete IMSA SportsCar Championship results ===
(key) (Races in bold indicate pole position; results in italics indicate fastest lap)

Year	Team	Class	Make	Engine	1	2	3	4	5	6	7	8	9	10	11	12	Pos.	Points
2017	Montaplast by Land-Motorsport	GTD	Audi R8 LMS	Audi 5.2 L V10	DAY; 2	SEB; 4	LBH	AUS	BEL	WGL	MOS	LIM	ELK	VIR	LGA	PET	41st	60
2020	Michael Shank Racing w/ Curb-Agajanian	GTD	Acura NSX GT3	Acura 3.5 L Turbo V6	DAY; 10	DAY	SEB	ELK	VIR	ATL	MDO	CLT	PET	LGA	SEB		51st	21
2021	Risi Competizione	GTLM	Ferrari 488 GTE	Ferrari F154CB 3.9 L Turbo V8	DAY; 4	SEB	DET	WGL	WGL	LIM	ELK	LGA	LBH	VIR	PET		13th	308
2022	WeatherTech Racing	GTD Pro	Mercedes-AMG GT3 Evo	Mercedes-AMG M159 6.2 L V8	DAY; 11	SEB; 3											19th	542
2022	WeatherTech Racing	GTD	Mercedes-AMG GT3 Evo	Mercedes-AMG M159 6.2 L V8			LBH	LGA	MID	DET	WGL	MOS	LIM; 7	ELK	VIR; 6	PET	39th	533
2023	WeatherTech Racing	GTD Pro	Mercedes-AMG GT3 Evo	Mercedes-AMG M159 6.2 L V8	**DAY**; 1	SEB; 3	LBH; 5	LGA; 1	WGL; 4	MOS; 3	LIM; 5	ELK; 5	VIR; 5	IMS; 1	PET; 1		2nd	3648
2024	SunEnergy1 Racing	GTD Pro	Mercedes-AMG GT3 Evo	Mercedes-AMG M159 6.2 L V8	DAY; 13	SEB	LGA	DET	WGL	MOS	ELK	VIR	IMS	PET			45th	201
2025	75 Express	GTD Pro	Mercedes-AMG GT3 Evo	Mercedes-AMG M159 6.2 L V8	DAY; 15	SEB	LGA	DET	WGL	MOS	ELK	VIR	IMS	PET			44th	182
2026	Bartone Bros with GetSpeed	GTD Pro	Mercedes-AMG GT3 Evo	Mercedes-AMG M159 6.2 L V8	DAY; 11	SEB	LGA	DET	WGL	MOS	ELK	VIR	IMS	PET			41st	225

=== Complete Bathurst 12 Hour results ===
Year	Team	Co-drivers	Car	Class	Laps	Ovr. Pos.	Cla. Pos.
2018	(United Kingdom) M-Sport	(United Kingdom) Guy Smith (United Kingdom) Steven Kane	Bentley Continental GT3 (2015)	Pro	265	16th	6th
2019	(United Kingdom) M-Sport	(United Kingdom) Steven Kane (South Africa) Jordan Pepper	Bentley Continental GT3 (2018)	Pro	311	8th	8th
2020	(United Kingdom) M-Sport	(South Africa) Jordan Pepper (Belgium) Maxime Soulet	Bentley Continental GT3 (2018)	Pro	314	**1st**	**1st**
2022	(United States) SunEnergy1 Racing / (Australia) Triple Eight Race Engineering	(Australia) Kenny Habul (Austria) Martin Konrad (Germany) Luca Stolz	Mercedes-AMG GT3 Evo	Pro-Am	291	**1st**	**1st**
2023	(United States) SunEnergy1 Racing / (France) AKKodis ASP Team	(Australia) Kenny Habul (Germany) Luca Stolz	Mercedes-AMG GT3 Evo	Pro	323	**1st**	**1st**
2024	(United States) SunEnergy1 Racing	(Australia) Kenny Habul (Germany) Luca Stolz	Mercedes-AMG GT3 Evo	Pro	275	**2nd**	**2nd**
2025	(Australia) 75 Express	(Australia) Kenny Habul (Germany) Luca Stolz	Mercedes-AMG GT3 Evo	Pro	306	**3rd**	**3rd**
2026	(Australia) 75 Express	(Australia) Kenny Habul (Germany) Luca Stolz	Mercedes-AMG GT3 Evo	Pro	262	7th	5th

=== Complete 24 Hours of Le Mans results ===
Year	Team	Co-Drivers	Car	Class	Laps	Pos.	Class Pos.
2019	(United States) Risi Competizione	(United Kingdom) Oliver Jarvis (Brazil) Pipo Derani	Ferrari 488 GTE Evo	GTE; Pro	329	40th	11th
2020	(United States) Risi Competizione	(France) Sébastien Bourdais (France) Olivier Pla	Ferrari 488 GTE Evo	GTE; Pro	339	23rd	4th
2025	(France) Alpine Endurance Team	(France) Frédéric Makowiecki (Germany) Mick Schumacher	Alpine A424	Hypercar	384	10th	10th
2026	(France) Alpine Endurance Team	(France) Frédéric Makowiecki (France) Victor Martins	Alpine A424	Hypercar	379	10th	10th

=== Complete 24 Hours of Nürburgring results ===
Year	Team	Co-Drivers	Car	Class	Laps	Pos.	Class Pos.
2020	(Germany) Phoenix Racing	(Italy) Michele Beretta (Germany) Kim-Luis Schramm (Germany) Frank Stippler	Audi R8 LMS Evo	SP9	65	DNF	DNF
2021	(Germany) Mercedes-AMG Team GetSpeed	(Germany) Dirk Müller (Germany) Fabian Schiller (France) Matthieu Vaxivière	Mercedes-AMG GT3 Evo	SP9	59	7th	7th
2022	(Germany) Mercedes-AMG Team GetSpeed BWT	(Germany) Maro Engel (Spain) Daniel Juncadella	Mercedes-AMG GT3 Evo	SP9 Pro	159	**3rd**	**3rd**
2023	(Germany) Mercedes-AMG Team GetSpeed	(Germany) Maro Engel (Spain) Daniel Juncadella	Mercedes-AMG GT3 Evo	SP9 Pro	49	DNF	DNF
2024	(Germany) Mercedes-AMG Team GetSpeed	(United Kingdom) Adam Christodoulou (Germany) Maro Engel (Germany) Fabian Schiller	Mercedes-AMG GT3 Evo	SP9 Pro	34	DNF	DNF
2026	(Netherlands) Mercedes-AMG Team Verstappen Racing	(Austria) Lucas Auer (Spain) Daniel Juncadella (Netherlands) Max Verstappen	Mercedes-AMG GT3 Evo	SP9 Pro	135	36th	9th

=== Complete British GT Championship results ===
(key) (Races in bold indicate pole position) (Races in italics indicate fastest lap)

Year	Team	Car	Class	1	2	3	4	5	6	7	8	9	DC	Points
2022	RAM Racing	Mercedes-AMG GT3 Evo	GT3	OUL; 1; 2	**OUL**; **2**; 3	SIL; 1	DON; 1	SNE; 1	SNE; 2	SPA; 1; 3	BRH; 1	DON; 1; 2	5th	92.5
2023	2 Seas Motorsport	Mercedes-AMG GT3 Evo	GT3	OUL; 1; 4	**OUL**; **2**; 1	SIL; 1; 7	DON; 1; 3	SNE; 1; 7	SNE; 2; 3	ALG; 1	BRH; 1; 4	DON; 1; 5	6th	122.5

^{†} Driver did not finish, but was classified as he completed 90% race distance.

=== Complete Asian Le Mans Series results ===
(key) (Races in bold indicate pole position) (Races in italics indicate fastest lap)

Year	Team	Class	Car	Engine	1	2	3	4	5	6	Pos	Points
2023	HubAuto Racing	GT	Mercedes-AMG GT3 Evo	Mercedes-AMG M159 6.2 L V8	DUB; 1 Ret	DUB; 2; 9	**ABU**; **1**; 14	**ABU**; **2**; 16			12th	12
2023–24	Craft-Bamboo Racing	GT	Mercedes-AMG GT3 Evo	Mercedes-AMG M159 6.2 L V8	SEP; 1 Ret	**SEP**; **2**; 8	DUB; 1	ABU; 1	ABU; 2		27th	5
2024–25	Winward Racing	GT	Mercedes-AMG GT3 Evo	Mercedes-AMG M159 6.2 L V8	SEP; 1; 5	SEP; 2; 1	DUB; 1	DUB; 2	ABU; 1	ABU; 2	7th	35

=== Complete FIA World Endurance Championship results ===
(key) (Races in bold indicate pole position) (Races in italics indicate fastest lap)

Year	Entrant	Class	Chassis	Engine	1	2	3	4	5	6	7	8	Rank	Points
2024	Alpine Endurance Team	Hypercar	Alpine A424	Alpine V634 3.4 L Turbo V6	QAT	IMO; 13	SPA; 9^{1}	LMS	SÃO	COA	FUJ; 7	BHR; 4	21st	24
2025	Alpine Endurance Team	Hypercar	Alpine A424	Alpine V634 3.4 L Turbo V6	QAT; 13	IMO; 3	SPA; 3	LMS; 9	SÃO; 9	COA; 15	FUJ; 14	BHR; 12	16th	36
2026	Alpine Endurance Team	Hypercar	Alpine A424	Alpine V634 3.4 L Turbo V6	IMO; 11	SPA; 11	LMS; 9	SÃO; 11	COA; 5	**FUJ**; 2	CAT; 8	MNZ; 2	13th	54

- **^1** – Ineligible for points having failed to meet minimum drive time.

=== Complete Deutsche Tourenwagen Masters results ===
(key) (Races in bold indicate pole position) (Races in italics indicate fastest lap)

Year	Team	Car	1	2	3	4	5	6	7	8	9	10	11	12	13	14	15	16	Pos	Points
2024	Mercedes-AMG Team HRT	Mercedes-AMG GT3 Evo	OSC; 1	OSC; 2	LAU; 1	LAU; 2	ZAN; 1	ZAN; 2	NOR; 1	NOR; 2	NÜR; 1	NÜR; 2	SAC; 1	SAC; 2	RBR; 1	RBR; 2	HOC; 1; 6	HOC; 2 Ret	21st	10
2025	Mercedes-AMG Team Mann-Filter	Mercedes-AMG GT3 Evo	OSC; 1; 5	**OSC**; **2**; 2^{1}	LAU; 1; 5	LAU; 2; 3	ZAN; 1; 14	ZAN; 2; 8	NOR; 1; 7	NOR; 2; 10	NÜR; 1 Ret	NÜR; 2; 11	SAC; 1; 5^{2}	SAC; 2; 2	RBR; 1; 8	RBR; 2; 8	HOC; 1 Ret	HOC; 2 Ret	9th	142
2026	Mercedes-AMG Team Mann-Filter	Mercedes-AMG GT3 Evo	RBR; 1 Ret	RBR; 2; 4	ZAN; 1; 4	ZAN; 2; 12	LAU; 1; 7	LAU; 2 Ret	NOR; 1; 7	NOR; 2; 5	OSC; 1 Ret	OSC; 2; 8	NÜR; 1; 8	**NÜR**; **2**; 14^{1}	SAC; 1; 2^{3}	SAC; 2 Ret^{3}	HOC; 1; 7	HOC; 2 Ret	10th	111

== Notes ==
Sporting positions
Preceded by Connor De Phillippi; Christopher Mies	ADAC GT Masters; Champion; 2017	Succeeded by Mathieu Jaminet; Robert Renauer
Preceded by Matthew Campbell; Dennis Olsen; Dirk Werner	Winner of the Bathurst 12 Hour; 2020, 2022-2023; With: Jordan Pepper & Maxime Soulet (2020); Kenny Habul, Luca Stolz (2022–23) & Martin Konrad (2022)	Succeeded by Incumbent
Preceded by Alessandro Pier Guidi; Nicklas Nielsen; Côme Ledogar	GT World Challenge Europe Endurance Cup; Champion; 2022-2023; With: Raffaele Marciello, Daniel Juncadella (2022) & Timur Boguslavskiy (2023)	Succeeded by Incumbent
Preceded by Davide Rigon; Daniel Serra	Michelin Endurance Cup; GTD Pro Champion; 2023; With: Daniel Juncadella	Succeeded by Incumbent
