= Time in Belgium =

In Belgium the standard time is Central European Time (UTC+01:00). Belgium observes Summer Time (daylight saving time) from the last Sunday in March (02:00 CET) to the last Sunday in October (03:00 CEST). The transition dates are the same as for other European countries.

== Legal basis ==
The current legal basis for standard time in Belgium is the law of 11 June 2018 "introducing Coordinated Universal Time (UTC) as the basis for the legal time in Belgium" (Belgian official journal, 10 September 2018). Article 2 of this law states that the legal time is UTC +60 minutes during Winter Time and UTC +120 minutes during Summer Time. The new law abolishes the previous law of 29 April 1892 unifying time in Belgium and the law of 7 February 1920 amending it.

== See also ==
- Date and time notation in Belgium
- List of time zones
