= 2015 International GT Open =

Tenth season of the International GT Open

The 2015 International GT Open season was the tenth season of the International GT Open, the grand tourer-style sports car racing founded in 2006 by the Spanish GT Sport Organización. It began on 26 April at Circuit Paul Ricard and finished on 1 November, at Barcelona after seven double-header meetings.

The series changed tyre supplier from Dunlop to Michelin.

== Entry list ==
2015 Entry List
Team	Car	No.	Drivers	Class	Rounds
(Spain) Teo Martín Motorsport	McLaren 650S GT3	2	(Portugal) Álvaro Parente	PA	All
(Spain) Teo Martín Motorsport	McLaren 650S GT3	2	(Portugal) Miguel Ramos	PA	All
(Spain) Teo Martín Motorsport	McLaren 650S GT3	59	(United Kingdom) Andrew Watson	PA	5, 7
(Spain) Teo Martín Motorsport	McLaren 650S GT3	59	(United Kingdom) Rob Bell	PA	5
(Spain) Teo Martín Motorsport	McLaren 650S GT3	59	(Spain) Fernando Monje	PA	7
(Italy) Scuderia Villorba Corse	Ferrari 458 Italia GT3	3	(Italy) Alessandro Balzan	PA	All
(Italy) Scuderia Villorba Corse	Ferrari 458 Italia GT3	3	(Italy) Nicola Benucci	PA	All
(Spain) Drivex School	Audi R8 LMS ultra	5	(Italy) Lorenzo Bontempelli	PA	6
(Spain) Drivex School	Audi R8 LMS ultra	5	(Italy) Beniamino Caccia	PA	6
(Spain) Drivex School	Audi R8 LMS ultra	5	(Portugal) Miguel Amaral	PA	7
(Spain) Drivex School	Audi R8 LMS ultra	5	(Portugal) César Campaniço	PA	7
(Belgium) Aston Martin Brussels Racing	Aston Martin Vantage GT3	8	(Belgium) Michael Schmetz	PA	5
(Belgium) Aston Martin Brussels Racing	Aston Martin Vantage GT3	8	(Belgium) Tim Verbergt	PA	5
(Germany) H&R Spezialfedern GmbH & Co.KG	Ford GT	9	(Germany) Jürgen Alzen	Am	5
(United Kingdom) TF Sport	Aston Martin Vantage GT3	10	(United Kingdom) Euan Hankey	Am	5–7
(United Kingdom) TF Sport	Aston Martin Vantage GT3	10	(Turkey) Salih Yoluç	Am	5–7
(Switzerland) Kessel Racing	Ferrari 458 Italia GT3	11	(Poland) Michał Broniszewski	PA	1
(Switzerland) Kessel Racing	Ferrari 458 Italia GT3	11	(Italy) Giacomo Piccini	PA	1
(Italy) Solaris Motorsport	Chevrolet Corvette Z06.R GT3	12	(Italy) Francesco Sini	PA	1, 6
(Italy) Solaris Motorsport	Chevrolet Corvette Z06.R GT3	12	(Italy) Stefano Costantini	PA	1
(Italy) Solaris Motorsport	Chevrolet Corvette Z06.R GT3	12	(Italy) Marcello Puglisi	PA	6
(Spain) Baporo Motorsport	Ferrari 458 Italia GT3 (2013)	15	(Argentina) Emiliano López	PA	1–3
(Spain) Baporo Motorsport	Ferrari 458 Italia GT3 (2013)	15	(Spain) José Manuel Pérez-Aicart	PA	1
(Spain) Baporo Motorsport	Ferrari 458 Italia GT3 (2013)	15	(Argentina) Matías Russo	PA	2–3
(Spain) AERT	Lamborghini Gallardo FL2	16	(Russia) Anton Nebylitskiy	PA	1–5
(Spain) AERT	Lamborghini Gallardo FL2	16	(Spain) Álvaro Barba	PA	1–4
(Spain) AERT	Lamborghini Gallardo FL2	16	(Argentina) Matías Russo	PA	5
(Austria) Lechner Racing	Mercedes-Benz SLS AMG GT3	17	(Austria) Walter Lechner	PA	1
(Austria) Lechner Racing	Mercedes-Benz SLS AMG GT3	17	(Austria) Mario Plachutta	PA	1
(Portugal) Sports and You	Mercedes-Benz SLS AMG GT3	18	(Portugal) António Coimbra (Portugal) "Manuel Da Costa"	Am	2–3, 7
(Portugal) Sports and You	Mercedes-Benz SLS AMG GT3	18	(Portugal) Luís Silva (Portugal) "Miguel Sardinha"	Am	2–3, 7
(Portugal) Team Novadriver	Audi R8 LMS ultra	19	(Switzerland) Joël Camathias	PA	2
(Portugal) Team Novadriver	Audi R8 LMS ultra	19	(Portugal) César Campaniço	PA	2
(Italy) Krypton Motorsport	Porsche 911 GT3-R	21	(Italy) Luca Pastorelli	Am	4
(Italy) Krypton Motorsport	Porsche 911 GT3-R	21	(Italy) Stefano Pezzucchi	Am	4
(Italy) Krypton Motorsport	Porsche 911 GT3-R	35	(Italy) Stefano Pezzucchi	PA	7
(Italy) Krypton Motorsport	Porsche 911 GT3-R	35	(Italy) Thomas Biagi	PA	7
(United Kingdom) Balfe Motorsport	Ferrari 458 Italia GT3 (2013)	22	(United Kingdom) Shaun Balfe	PA	2–3, 6
(United Kingdom) Balfe Motorsport	Ferrari 458 Italia GT3 (2013)	22	(United Kingdom) Phil Keen	PA	2–3, 6
(United Kingdom) Team Parker Racing	Audi R8 LMS ultra	24	(United Kingdom) Ian Loggie	PA	1
(United Kingdom) Team Parker Racing	Audi R8 LMS ultra	24	(United Kingdom) Callum MacLeod	PA	1
(Italy) MP1 Corse	Ferrari 458 Italia GT3 (2013)	25	(Italy) Valentino Fornaroli	PA	6
(Italy) MP1 Corse	Ferrari 458 Italia GT3 (2013)	25	(Italy) Gabriele Lancieri	PA	6
(Austria) HP Racing	Lamborghini Gallardo R-EX	26	(Germany) "Coach McKansy"	PA	7
(Austria) HP Racing	Lamborghini Gallardo R-EX	26	(Austria) Hari Proczyk	PA	7
(France) TDS Racing	BMW Z4 GT3	27	(France) Henry Hassid	PA	7
(France) TDS Racing	BMW Z4 GT3	27	(France) Franck Perera	PA	7
(Spain) Monlau Competición	Renault Sport R.S. 01	30	(Spain) José Manuel Pérez Aicart	PA	7
(Spain) Monlau Competición	Renault Sport R.S. 01	30	(Belgium) Jurgen Smet	PA	7
(Switzerland) Swiss Team	Maserati GranTurismo MC GT3	33	(Switzerland) Mauro Calamia	Am	1
(Portugal) Veloso Motorsport	Porsche 911 GT3 Cup (2014)	40	(Portugal) Nuno Batista	G	2
(Portugal) Veloso Motorsport	Porsche 911 GT3 Cup (2014)	40	(Portugal) Pedro Marreiros	G	2
(Portugal) Gonçalo Nuno Manahu	Porsche 997 GT3 Cup (2009)	41	(Portugal) Manuel José Castro	G	2
(Portugal) Gonçalo Nuno Manahu	Porsche 997 GT3 Cup (2009)	41	(Portugal) Gonçalo Nuno Manahu	G	2
(Italy) AF Corse	Ferrari 458 Italia GT3 (2013)	49	(United States) Howard Blank	Am	5–7
(Italy) AF Corse	Ferrari 458 Italia GT3 (2013)	49	(France) Yannick Mallegol	Am	5–7
(Italy) AF Corse	Ferrari 458 Italia GT3 (2013)	51	(Thailand) Pasin Lathouras	PA	All
(Italy) AF Corse	Ferrari 458 Italia GT3 (2013)	51	(Italy) Michele Rugolo	PA	All
(Italy) AF Corse	Ferrari 458 Italia GT3 (2013)	52	(United Kingdom) Duncan Cameron	PA	1, 4, 6–7
(Italy) AF Corse	Ferrari 458 Italia GT3 (2013)	52	(Republic of Ireland) Matt Griffin	PA	1, 4, 6–7
(Italy) AF Corse	Ferrari 458 Italia GT3 (2013)	53	(Portugal) Filipe Barreiros	Am	2–6
(Italy) AF Corse	Ferrari 458 Italia GT3 (2013)	53	(Portugal) Francisco Guedes	Am	2, 6
(Italy) AF Corse	Ferrari 458 Italia GT3 (2013)	53	(Denmark) Mads Rasmussen	Am	3–4
(Italy) AF Corse	Ferrari 458 Italia GT3 (2013)	54	(Switzerland) Thomas Flohr	Am	4
(Italy) AF Corse	Ferrari 458 Italia GT3 (2013)	55	(Germany) Claudio Sdanewitsch	Am	All
(Italy) AF Corse	Ferrari 458 Italia GT3 (2013)	55	(Russia) Ilya Melnikov	Am	1–4, 6–7
(Italy) AF Corse	Ferrari 458 Italia GT3 (2013)	55	(Belgium) Stéphane Lémeret	Am	5
(Italy) AF Corse	Ferrari 458 Italia GT3 (2013)	56	(Italy) Giorgio Roda	PA	4
(Italy) AF Corse	Ferrari 458 Italia GT3 (2013)	90	(Italy) Raffaele Giammaria	PA	All
(Italy) AF Corse	Ferrari 458 Italia GT3 (2013)	90	(Argentina) Ezequiel Pérez Companc	PA	All
(Austria) AT Racing	Ferrari 458 Italia GT3 (2013)	57	(Belarus) Alexander Talkanitsa	PA	4
(Austria) AT Racing	Ferrari 458 Italia GT3 (2013)	57	(Belarus) Alexander Talkanitsa Jr.	PA	4
(United Arab Emirates) Blue Jumeirah Team	Radical RXC V8	60	(Spain) Rafael Unzurrunzaga	Am	3–5
(United Kingdom) Radical Works	Radical RXC V8	62	(United Kingdom) James Abbott	Am	3–7
(United Kingdom) Radical Works	Radical RXC V8	62	(Switzerland) Shahin Nouri	Am	3
(United Kingdom) Radical Works	Radical RXC V8	62	(United Kingdom) Chris Hoy	Am	4
(United Kingdom) Radical Works	Radical RXC V8	62	(Netherlands) Roeland de Waart	Am	7
(Netherlands) Kox Racing	McLaren 650S GT3	76; 48	(Netherlands) Peter Kox	PA	1, 7
(Netherlands) Kox Racing	McLaren 650S GT3	76; 48	(Netherlands) Nico Pronk	PA	1, 7

Icon	Class
PA	Pro-Amateur
Am	Amateur
G	Guest

== Race calendar and results ==
- A seven-round provisional calendar was revealed on 5 November 2014.

Round		Circuit	Date	Pole position	GTS Winner	GTAM Winner
1	R1	(France) Circuit Paul Ricard, Le Castellet	25 April	(Italy) No. 3 Scuderia Villorba Corse	(Italy) No. 3 Scuderia Villorba Corse	(Italy) No. 55 AF Corse
1	R1	(France) Circuit Paul Ricard, Le Castellet	25 April	(Italy) Alessandro Balzan (Italy) Nicola Benucci	(Italy) Alessandro Balzan (Italy) Nicola Benucci	(Russia) Ilya Melnikov (Germany) Claudio Sdanewitsch
1	R2	(France) Circuit Paul Ricard, Le Castellet	26 April	(Spain) No. 2 Teo Martín Motorsport	(Italy) No. 51 AF Corse	(Italy) No. 55 AF Corse
1	R2	(France) Circuit Paul Ricard, Le Castellet	26 April	(Portugal) Álvaro Parente (Portugal) Miguel Ramos	(Thailand) Pasin Lathouras (Italy) Michele Rugolo	(Russia) Ilya Melnikov (Germany) Claudio Sdanewitsch
2	R1	(Portugal) Autódromo do Estoril	9 May	(United Kingdom) No. 22 Balfe Motorsport	(Italy) No. 90 AF Corse	(Portugal) No. 18 Sports and You
2	R1	(Portugal) Autódromo do Estoril	9 May	(United Kingdom) Shaun Balfe (United Kingdom) Phil Keen	(Italy) Raffaele Giammaria (Argentina) Ezequiel Pérez Companc	(Portugal) António Coimbra (Portugal) Luis Silva
2	R2	(Portugal) Autódromo do Estoril	10 May	(Italy) No. 3 Scuderia Villorba Corse	(Spain) No. 15 Baporo Motorsport	(Portugal) No. 18 Sports and You
2	R2	(Portugal) Autódromo do Estoril	10 May	(Italy) Alessandro Balzan (Italy) Nicola Benucci	(Argentina) Emiliano Lopez (Argentina) Matías Russo	(Portugal) António Coimbra (Portugal) Luis Silva
3	R1	(United Kingdom) Silverstone Circuit	6 June	(Spain) No. 2 Teo Martín Motorsport	(Spain) No. 2 Teo Martín Motorsport	(Italy) No. 53 AF Corse
3	R1	(United Kingdom) Silverstone Circuit	6 June	(Portugal) Álvaro Parente (Portugal) Miguel Ramos	(Portugal) Álvaro Parente (Portugal) Miguel Ramos	(Portugal) Filipe Barreiros (Denmark) Mads Rasmussen
3	R2	(United Kingdom) Silverstone Circuit	7 June	(United Kingdom) No. 22 Balfe Motorsport	(Italy) No. 90 AF Corse	(Italy) No. 53 AF Corse
3	R2	(United Kingdom) Silverstone Circuit	7 June	(United Kingdom) Shaun Balfe (United Kingdom) Phil Keen	(Italy) Raffaele Giammaria (Argentina) Ezequiel Pérez Companc	(Portugal) Filipe Barreiros (Denmark) Mads Rasmussen
4	R1	(Austria) Red Bull Ring, Spielberg	4 July	(Spain) No. 2 Teo Martín Motorsport	(Italy) No. 51 AF Corse	(Italy) No. 55 AF Corse
4	R1	(Austria) Red Bull Ring, Spielberg	4 July	(Portugal) Álvaro Parente (Portugal) Miguel Ramos	(Thailand) Pasin Lathouras (Italy) Michele Rugolo	(Russia) Ilya Melnikov (Germany) Claudio Sdanewitsch
4	R2	(Austria) Red Bull Ring, Spielberg	5 July	(Spain) No. 2 Teo Martín Motorsport	(Italy) No. 90 AF Corse	(Italy) No. 55 AF Corse
4	R2	(Austria) Red Bull Ring, Spielberg	5 July	(Portugal) Álvaro Parente (Portugal) Miguel Ramos	(Italy) Raffaele Giammaria (Argentina) Ezequiel Pérez Companc	(Russia) Ilya Melnikov (Germany) Claudio Sdanewitsch
5	R1	(Belgium) Circuit de Spa-Francorchamps	5 September	(Italy) No. 51 AF Corse	(Italy) No. 51 AF Corse	(United Kingdom) No. 10 TF Sport
5	R1	(Belgium) Circuit de Spa-Francorchamps	5 September	(Thailand) Pasin Lathouras (Italy) Michele Rugolo	(Thailand) Pasin Lathouras (Italy) Michele Rugolo	(United Kingdom) Euan Hankey (Turkey) Salih Yoluç
5	R2	(Belgium) Circuit de Spa-Francorchamps	6 September	(Spain) No. 59 Teo Martín Motorsport	(Spain) No. 2 Teo Martín Motorsport	(United Kingdom) No. 10 TF Sport
5	R2	(Belgium) Circuit de Spa-Francorchamps	6 September	(United Kingdom) Rob Bell (United Kingdom) Andrew Watson	(Portugal) Álvaro Parente (Portugal) Miguel Ramos	(United Kingdom) Euan Hankey (Turkey) Salih Yoluç
6	R1	(Italy) Autodromo Nazionale Monza	3 October	(Spain) No. 2 Teo Martín Motorsport	(Spain) No. 2 Teo Martín Motorsport	(Italy) No. 55 AF Corse
6	R1	(Italy) Autodromo Nazionale Monza	3 October	(Portugal) Álvaro Parente (Portugal) Miguel Ramos	(Portugal) Álvaro Parente (Portugal) Miguel Ramos	(Russia) Ilya Melnikov (Germany) Claudio Sdanewitsch
6	R2	(Italy) Autodromo Nazionale Monza	4 October	(United Kingdom) No. 62 Radical Works	(Italy) No. 90 AF Corse	(United Kingdom) No. 10 TF Sport
6	R2	(Italy) Autodromo Nazionale Monza	4 October	(United Kingdom) James Abbott	(Italy) Raffaele Giammaria (Argentina) Ezequiel Pérez Companc	(United Kingdom) Euan Hankey (Turkey) Salih Yoluç
7	R1	(Spain) Circuit de Barcelona-Catalunya	31 October	(Spain) No. 2 Teo Martín Motorsport	(Spain) No. 59 Teo Martín Motorsport	(Italy) No. 55 AF Corse
7	R1	(Spain) Circuit de Barcelona-Catalunya	31 October	(Portugal) Álvaro Parente (Portugal) Miguel Ramos	(Spain) Fernando Monje (United Kingdom) Andrew Watson	(Russia) Ilya Melnikov (Germany) Claudio Sdanewitsch
7	R2	(Spain) Circuit de Barcelona-Catalunya	1 November	(United Kingdom) No. 10 TF Sport	(Italy) No. 90 AF Corse	(Portugal) No. 18 Sports and You
7	R2	(Spain) Circuit de Barcelona-Catalunya	1 November	(United Kingdom) Euan Hankey (Turkey) Salih Yoluç	(Italy) Raffaele Giammaria (Argentina) Ezequiel Pérez Companc	(Portugal) Manuel Da Costa (Portugal) Miguel Sardinha
