= 2022 British Endurance Championship =

British motorsport championship

The 2022 MSUK British Endurance Championship was the 11th endurance championship organised by Britcar, the third as the British Endurance Championship. The season began at Silverstone on 12 March and concluded at Donington Park on 23 October.

== Calendar ==
| Round | Circuit | Length | Date |
|---|---|---|---|
| 1 | Silverstone GP, Northamptonshire | 180 min | 12 March |
| 2 | Oulton Park, Cheshire | 120 min | 2 April |
| 3 | Snetterton Circuit (300), Norfolk | 180 min | 14 May |
| 4 | Silverstone GP, Northamptonshire | 120 min | 18 June |
| 5 | Donington Park National, Leicestershire | 120 min | 20 August |
| 6 | Donington Park GP, Leicestershire | 120 min | 22 October |

== Teams and drivers ==
Cars are assigned classed based on speed, horsepower, momentum, equipment fitted to the car and the car's model;
Class A: GT3 cars
Class B: Modern gen cup; 488 Chal. Evo, 992 Cup, ST Evo, cars
Class C: Older gen cup; 458 Chal., 991 Cup, ST, cars
Class D: GT4 cars
Class E: TCR cars
Class F: Non-homologated cars of similar performance to D and E classes

All teams are British-registered.

| Team | Car | Engine | No. | Drivers | Rounds |
Class A
| (United Kingdom) Motus One with Moorgate | McLaren 650S GT3 | McLaren 3.8L Turbo V8 | 1 | (United Kingdom) Will Powell | 1 |
| (United Kingdom) Motus One with Moorgate | McLaren 650S GT3 | McLaren 3.8L Turbo V8 | 1 | (United Kingdom) David Scaramanga | 1 |
| (United Kingdom) MacG Racing | Taranis | Chevrolet LS7 7.0 L V8 | 3 | (United Kingdom) Jonny MacGregor | 1–3, 5 |
| (United Kingdom) MacG Racing | Taranis | Chevrolet LS7 7.0 L V8 | 3 | (United Kingdom) Ben Sharich | 1, 3 |
| (United Kingdom) Venture Engineering | Aston Martin Vulcan AMR Pro | Aston Martin 7.0 L V12 | 6 | (United Kingdom) Steve Tomkins | 1–3, 6 |
| (United Kingdom) Venture Engineering | Aston Martin Vulcan AMR Pro | Aston Martin 7.0 L V12 | 6 | (Latvia) Gleb Stepanovs | 1–2, 6 |
| (United Kingdom) Venture Engineering | Aston Martin Vulcan AMR Pro | Aston Martin 7.0 L V12 | 6 | (United Kingdom) Matt George | 3 |
| (United Kingdom) Race Lab | Lamborghini Huracán GT3 Evo | Lamborghini 5.2 L V10 | 24 | (United Kingdom) Lee Frost | 1–2, 5–6 |
| (United Kingdom) Race Lab | Lamborghini Huracán GT3 Evo | Lamborghini 5.2 L V10 | 24 | (United Kingdom) Lucky Khera | 1–2, 5–6 |
| (United Kingdom) 7TSix | McLaren 720S GT3 | McLaren M840T 4.0 L Turbo V8 | 24 | (United Kingdom) Euan Hankey | 3 |
| (United Kingdom) 7TSix | McLaren 720S GT3 | McLaren M840T 4.0 L Turbo V8 | 24 | (United Kingdom) Lucky Khera | 3 |
| (United Kingdom) ING Sport | BMW Z4 GT3 | BMW 4.4 L V8 | 55 | (United Kingdom) Kevin Clarke | All |
| (United Kingdom) ING Sport | BMW Z4 GT3 | BMW 4.4 L V8 | 55 | (United Kingdom) Ian Lawson | 1, 3–6 |
| (United Kingdom) ING Sport | BMW Z4 GT3 | BMW 4.4 L V8 | 55 | (United Kingdom) Ryan Lindsay | 2–5 |
| (United Kingdom) Simpsons Motorsport | Mercedes-AMG GT3 | Mercedes-AMG M159 6.2 L V8 | 92 | (United Kingdom) Hugo Cook | 4–6 |
| (United Kingdom) Simpsons Motorsport | Mercedes-AMG GT3 | Mercedes-AMG M159 6.2 L V8 | 92 | (United Kingdom) Sacha Kakad | 4–6 |
| (United Kingdom) Rob Boston Racing | Mercedes-AMG GT3 Evo | Mercedes-AMG M159 6.2 L V8 | 160 | (United Kingdom) Tom Jackson | All |
| (United Kingdom) Rob Boston Racing | Mercedes-AMG GT3 Evo | Mercedes-AMG M159 6.2 L V8 | 160 | (United Kingdom) Wayne Marrs | All |
Class A Invitation
| (United Kingdom) Greystone GT | McLaren 720S GT3 | McLaren M840T 4.0 L Turbo V8 | 23 | (United Kingdom) Michael Broadhurst | 6 |
| (United Kingdom) Greystone GT | McLaren 720S GT3 | McLaren M840T 4.0 L Turbo V8 | 23 | (United Kingdom) Iain Campbell | 6 |
| (United Kingdom) Scott Sport | Lamborghini Huracán GT3 Evo | Lamborghini 5.2 L V10 | 61 | (Italy) Andrea Amici | 3 |
| (United Kingdom) Scott Sport | Lamborghini Huracán GT3 Evo | Lamborghini 5.2 L V10 | 61 | (United Kingdom) John Dhillon | 3 |
Class B
| (Switzerland) Bovet Racing with Race-Lab | Lamborghini Huracán Super Trofeo Evo 1–3; Lamborghini Huracán Super Trofeo EVO 2 4–5 | Lamborghini 5.2 L V10 | 19 | (Switzerland) Claude Bovet | 1–5 |
| (Switzerland) Bovet Racing with Race-Lab | Lamborghini Huracán Super Trofeo Evo 1–3; Lamborghini Huracán Super Trofeo EVO 2 4–5 | Lamborghini 5.2 L V10 | 19 | (United Kingdom) David McDonald | 1–5 |
| (Italy) AF Corse | Ferrari 488 Challenge Evo | Ferrari 3.9 L Turbo V8 | 23 | (United Kingdom) Johnny Mowlem | 4 |
| (Italy) AF Corse | Ferrari 488 Challenge Evo | Ferrari 3.9 L Turbo V8 | 23 | (Ghana) William Tewiah | 4 |
| (United Kingdom) Stanbridge Motorsport | Lamborghini Huracán Super Trofeo Evo | Lamborghini 5.2 L V10 | 41 | (United Kingdom) Fraser Smart | 1 |
| (United Kingdom) Stanbridge Motorsport | Lamborghini Huracán Super Trofeo Evo | Lamborghini 5.2 L V10 | 41 | (United Kingdom) James Simons | 1 |
| (United Kingdom) Stanbridge Motorsport | Lamborghini Huracán Super Trofeo Evo | Lamborghini 5.2 L V10 | 41 | (United Kingdom) Chris Kemp | 3–4 |
| (United Kingdom) Stanbridge Motorsport | Lamborghini Huracán Super Trofeo Evo | Lamborghini 5.2 L V10 | 41 | (Denmark) Benny Simonsen | 3 |
| (United Kingdom) Stanbridge Motorsport | Lamborghini Huracán Super Trofeo Evo | Lamborghini 5.2 L V10 | 41 | (United Kingdom) Daniel Brown | 4 |
| (United Kingdom) Balfe Motorsport with FastAF Racing | Dodge Viper Competition Coupe GT3 | Dodge 8.3 L V10 | 89 | (United Kingdom) Angus Fender | 2 |
| (United Kingdom) FF Corse | Ferrari 488 Challenge | Ferrari 3.9 L Turbo V8 | 555 | (United Kingdom) John Seale | 1 |
| (United Kingdom) FF Corse | Ferrari 488 Challenge | Ferrari 3.9 L Turbo V8 | 555 | (United Kingdom) Jamie Stanley | 1 |
Class B Invitation
| (United Kingdom) Mtech | Lamborghini Huracán Super Trofeo Evo | Lamborghini 5.2 L V10 | 23 | (United Kingdom) Iain Campbell | 3 |
| (United Kingdom) Mtech | Lamborghini Huracán Super Trofeo Evo | Lamborghini 5.2 L V10 | 23 | (United Kingdom) Oliver Webb | 3 |
Class C
| (United Kingdom) PB Racing | Porsche 991 GT3 Cup | Porsche 4.0 L Flat-6 | 9 | (United Kingdom) Marcus Clutton | 1–3, 5–6 |
| (United Kingdom) PB Racing | Porsche 991 GT3 Cup | Porsche 4.0 L Flat-6 | 9 | (United Kingdom) Peter Erceg | 1–3, 5–6 |
| (United Kingdom) Woodrow Motorsport | BMW 1M E82 | BMW S85 5.0 L V10 | 18 | (United Kingdom) Mike Moss | 1 |
| (United Kingdom) Woodrow Motorsport | BMW 1M E82 | BMW S85 5.0 L V10 | 18 | (United Kingdom) Chris Murphy | 1 |
| (United Kingdom) SG Racing | Porsche 997 Cup | Porsche 4.0 L Flat-6 | 32 | (United Kingdom) Mark Cunningham | 4–5 |
| (United Kingdom) SG Racing | Porsche 997 Cup | Porsche 4.0 L Flat-6 | 32 | (United Kingdom) Peter Cunningham | 4–5 |
| (United Kingdom) Valluga Racing | Ferrari 458 Challenge | Ferrari 4.5 L V8 | 51 | (United Kingdom) Carl Cavers | 1, 3–5 |
| (United Kingdom) Valluga Racing | Ferrari 458 Challenge | Ferrari 4.5 L V8 | 51 | (United Kingdom) Lewis Plato | 1, 3–5 |
| (United Kingdom) Valluga Racing | Porsche 718 Cayman GT4 RS Clubsport | Porsche 3.8 L Flat-6 | 51 | (United Kingdom) Carl Cavers | 2, 6 |
| (United Kingdom) Valluga Racing | Porsche 718 Cayman GT4 RS Clubsport | Porsche 3.8 L Flat-6 | 51 | (United Kingdom) Lewis Plato | 2, 6 |
| (United Kingdom) Bespoke Defenders | Porsche 991 GT3 Cup | Porsche 4.0 L Flat-6 | 69 | (New Zealand) Dave Benett | 1–2, 5–6 |
| (United Kingdom) Bespoke Defenders | Porsche 991 GT3 Cup | Porsche 4.0 L Flat-6 | 69 | (United Kingdom) Marcus Fothergill | 1–2, 5–6 |
| (United Kingdom) Bespoke Defenders | Porsche 991 GT3 Cup | Porsche 4.0 L Flat-6 | 69 | (United Kingdom) Johnny Mowlem | 1, 5–6 |
| (United Kingdom) Bespoke Defenders | Porsche 991 GT3 Cup | Porsche 4.0 L Flat-6 | 69 | (United Kingdom) Nigel Moore | 2 |
| (United Kingdom) RNR Performance Cars | Ferrari 458 Challenge | Ferrari 4.5 L V8 | 144 | (United Kingdom) Chris Compton-Goddard | All |
| (United Kingdom) RNR Performance Cars | Ferrari 458 Challenge | Ferrari 4.5 L V8 | 144 | (United Kingdom) Charlie Hollings | 1–3, 5–6 |
| (United Kingdom) RNR Performance Cars | Ferrari 458 Challenge | Ferrari 4.5 L V8 | 144 | (United Kingdom) Bradley Ellis | 4 |
| (United Kingdom) RNR Performance Cars | Ferrari 458 Challenge | Ferrari 4.5 L V8 | 144 | (United Kingdom) Jamie Stanley | 5–6 |
| (United Kingdom) Team HARD. Racing | Porsche 991 GT3 Cup | Porsche 4.0 L Flat-6 | 222 | (United Kingdom) Callum Jenkins | 1–2 |
| (United Kingdom) Team HARD. Racing | Porsche 991 GT3 Cup | Porsche 4.0 L Flat-6 | 222 | (United Kingdom) Ollie Turner | 1–2 |
Class C Invitation
| (United Kingdom) Team HARD. Racing | Ginetta G55 Supercup | Ford 3.7 L V6 | 5 | (United Kingdom) Ray Harris | 2 |
| (United Kingdom) Team HARD. Racing | Ginetta G55 Supercup | Ford 3.7 L V6 | 5 | (United Kingdom) Chris Murphy | 2 |
Class D
| (United Kingdom) Valluga Racing | Porsche 718 Cayman GT4 RS Clubsport | Porsche 3.8 L Flat-6 | 7 | (United Kingdom) Jake Little | 1–4 |
| (United Kingdom) Valluga Racing | Porsche 718 Cayman GT4 RS Clubsport | Porsche 3.8 L Flat-6 | 7 | (United Kingdom) James Little | 1–4 |
| (United Kingdom) Venture Innovations | Mercedes-AMG GT4 | Mercedes-AMG M178 4.0 L V8 | 21 | (United Kingdom) Neville Jones | 4–6 |
| (United Kingdom) Venture Innovations | Mercedes-AMG GT4 | Mercedes-AMG M178 4.0 L V8 | 21 | (United Kingdom) Matt George | 4–6 |
| (United Kingdom) Infinity Financial Racing by Team BRIT | Aston Martin Vantage GT4 | Aston Martin 4.7 L V8 | 33 | (United Kingdom) Dale Albutt | 1–2, 4 |
| (United Kingdom) Infinity Financial Racing by Team BRIT | Aston Martin Vantage GT4 | Aston Martin 4.7 L V8 | 33 | (United Kingdom) Mark Albutt | 1–2, 4 |
| (United Kingdom) Breakell Racing | Mercedes-AMG GT4 | Mercedes-AMG M178 4.0 L V8 | 35 | (New Zealand) Grant Dalton | 4–5 |
| (United Kingdom) Breakell Racing | Mercedes-AMG GT4 | Mercedes-AMG M178 4.0 L V8 | 35 | (New Zealand) Grant Woolford | 4 |
| (United Kingdom) Breakell Racing | Mercedes-AMG GT4 | Mercedes-AMG M178 4.0 L V8 | 35 | (United Kingdom) James Breakell | 5 |
| (United Kingdom) Team HARD. Racing | Ginetta G55 GT4 | Ford 3.7 L V6 | 36 | (United Kingdom) Josh Hislop | 1–5 |
| (United Kingdom) Team HARD. Racing | Ginetta G55 GT4 | Ford 3.7 L V6 | 36 | (United Kingdom) Michael McPhersen | 1–3 |
| (United Kingdom) Team HARD. Racing | Ginetta G55 GT4 | Ford 3.7 L V6 | 36 | (United Kingdom) Ray Harris | 1, 4 |
| (United Kingdom) Team HARD. Racing | Ginetta G55 GT4 | Ford 3.7 L V6 | 36 | (United Kingdom) Sam Randon | 5–6 |
| (United Kingdom) Team HARD. Racing | Ginetta G55 GT4 | Ford 3.7 L V6 | 36 | (United Kingdom) Will Orton | 6 |
| (United Kingdom) T7 Motorsport | Aston Martin Vantage AMR GT4 | Aston Martin 4.0 L Turbo V8 | 50 | (United Kingdom) Peter Montague | All |
| (United Kingdom) T7 Motorsport | Aston Martin Vantage AMR GT4 | Aston Martin 4.0 L Turbo V8 | 50 | (United Kingdom) Stuart Hall | 1–2, 4–6 |
| (United Kingdom) T7 Motorsport | Aston Martin Vantage AMR GT4 | Aston Martin 4.0 L Turbo V8 | 50 | (United Kingdom) Daniel Brown | 3, 6 |
| (United Kingdom) Team BRIT | Aston Martin Vantage GT4 | Aston Martin 4.7 L V8 | 68 | (United Kingdom) Andy Tucker | All |
| (United Kingdom) Team BRIT | Aston Martin Vantage GT4 | Aston Martin 4.7 L V8 | 68 | (United Kingdom) Luke Pound | 1–4 |
| (United Kingdom) Team BRIT | Aston Martin Vantage GT4 | Aston Martin 4.7 L V8 | 68 | (United Kingdom) Chris Overend | 5 |
| (United Kingdom) Team BRIT | Aston Martin Vantage GT4 | Aston Martin 4.7 L V8 | 68 | (United Kingdom) James Whitley | 6 |
| (United Kingdom) Motus One | McLaren 570S GT4 | McLaren 3.8 L Turbo V8 | 77 | (United Kingdom) Will Powell | 2 |
| (United Kingdom) Motus One | McLaren 570S GT4 | McLaren 3.8 L Turbo V8 | 77 | (United Kingdom) Dave Scaramanga | 2 |
Class D Invitation
| (United Kingdom) Motus One | Ginetta G55 GT4 | Ford 3.7 L V6 | 77 | (United Kingdom) Matt Cherrington | 5 |
| (United Kingdom) Motus One | Ginetta G55 GT4 | Ford 3.7 L V6 | 77 | (United Kingdom) Will Powell | 5 |
| (United Kingdom) Race Lab | Porsche 718 Cayman GT4 Clubsport | Porsche 3.8 L Flat-6 | 98 | (United Kingdom) Ian Gough | 4 |
| (United Kingdom) Race Lab | Porsche 718 Cayman GT4 Clubsport | Porsche 3.8 L Flat-6 | 98 | (United Kingdom) Euan Hankey | 4 |
| (United Kingdom) Team BRIT | McLaren 570S GT4 | McLaren 3.8 L Turbo V8 | 168 | (United Kingdom) Aaron Morgan | 2 |
| (United Kingdom) Team BRIT | McLaren 570S GT4 | McLaren 3.8 L Turbo V8 | 168 | (United Kingdom) Bobby Trundley | 2 |
Class E
| (United Kingdom) EDF Motorsports | Cupra León TCR | Volkswagen 2.0 L I4 | 22 | (United Kingdom) Richard Avery | All |
| (United Kingdom) EDF Motorsports | Cupra León TCR | Volkswagen 2.0 L I4 | 22 | (United Kingdom) Nick Hull | All |
| (United Kingdom) EDF Motorsports | Cupra León Competición TCR | Volkswagen 2.0 L I4 | 60 | (United Kingdom) Martin Byford | All |
| (United Kingdom) EDF Motorsports | Cupra León Competición TCR | Volkswagen 2.0 L I4 | 60 | (United Kingdom) Ashley Woodman | All |
| (United Kingdom) Corten-Millar Motorsport | Cupra León TCR | Volkswagen 2.0 L I4 | 26 | (United Kingdom) William Casswell | 3 |
| (United Kingdom) Corten-Millar Motorsport | Cupra León TCR | Volkswagen 2.0 L I4 | 26 | (United Kingdom) Brad Kaylor | 3 |
| (United Kingdom) CTR Alfatune | Cupra León TCR | Volkswagen 2.0 L I4 | 44 | (United Kingdom) Alex Day | All |
| (United Kingdom) CTR Alfatune | Cupra León TCR | Volkswagen 2.0 L I4 | 44 | (United Kingdom) William Foster | All |
| (United Kingdom) T4 Motorsport | Cupra León TCR | Volkswagen 2.0 L I4 | 63 | (Republic of Ireland) Max Hart | 3, 5 |
| (United Kingdom) T4 Motorsport | Cupra León TCR | Volkswagen 2.0 L I4 | 63 | (United Kingdom) Mark Havers | 3, 5 |
| (United Kingdom) Dragon Sport by Amigo | Vauxhall Astra TCR | Opel 2.0 L I4 | 66 | (United Kingdom) Max Coates | 1–5 |
| (United Kingdom) Dragon Sport by Amigo | Vauxhall Astra TCR | Opel 2.0 L I4 | 66 | (United Kingdom) Rhys Lloyd | 1–2, 4–5 |
| (United Kingdom) Dragon Sport by Amigo | Vauxhall Astra TCR | Opel 2.0 L I4 | 66 | (Switzerland) Yannick Mettler | 3 |
| (United Kingdom) Sheard Autosport | Volkswagen Golf GTI TCR | Volkswagen 2.0 L I4 | 87 | (United Kingdom) Jonathan Beeson | 1–3 |
| (United Kingdom) Sheard Autosport | Volkswagen Golf GTI TCR | Volkswagen 2.0 L I4 | 87 | (United Kingdom) George Heler | 1–3 |
| (United Kingdom) Sheard Autosport | Audi RS 3 LMS TCR (2021) | Volkswagen 2.0 L I4 | 87 | (United Kingdom) Jonathan Beeson | 4–6 |
| (United Kingdom) Sheard Autosport | Audi RS 3 LMS TCR (2021) | Volkswagen 2.0 L I4 | 87 | (United Kingdom) George Heler | 4, 6 |
| (United Kingdom) Motus One with Maximum Motorsport | Volkswagen Golf GTI TCR | Volkswagen 2.0 L I4 | 94 | (United Kingdom) Stewart Lines | 1–3 |
| (United Kingdom) Motus One with Maximum Motorsport | Volkswagen Golf GTI TCR | Volkswagen 2.0 L I4 | 94 | (United Kingdom) Anton Spires | 1, 3 |
| (United Kingdom) Motus One with Maximum Motorsport | Volkswagen Golf GTI TCR | Volkswagen 2.0 L I4 | 94 | (Republic of Ireland) Rob Butler | 2 |
| (United Kingdom) Motus One with Maximum Motorsport | Cupra León TCR | Volkswagen 2.0 L I4 | 94 | (United Kingdom) Matt Cherrington | 4 |
| (United Kingdom) Motus One with Maximum Motorsport | Cupra León TCR | Volkswagen 2.0 L I4 | 94 | (United Kingdom) Brad Thurston | 4 |
| (United Kingdom) Motus One with Maximum Motorsport | Cupra León TCR | Volkswagen 2.0 L I4 | 94 | (United Kingdom) Stewart Lines | 5 |
| (United Kingdom) Motus One with Maximum Motorsport | Cupra León TCR | Volkswagen 2.0 L I4 | 94 | (United Kingdom) Anton Spires | 5 |
| (United Kingdom) Motus One with Maximum Motorsport | Cupra León TCR | Volkswagen 2.0 L I4 | 94 | (United Kingdom) Scott Symons | 6 |
Class E Invitation
| (United Kingdom) JamSport Racing | Cupra León TCR | Volkswagen 2.0 L I4 | 40 | (United Kingdom) Simon Tomlinson | 5–6 |
| (United Kingdom) Motus One Racing | Volkswagen Golf GTI TCR | Volkswagen 2.0 L I4 | 77 | (United Kingdom) Brad Thurston | 6 |
| (United Kingdom) Motus One Racing | Volkswagen Golf GTI TCR | Volkswagen 2.0 L I4 | 77 | (United Kingdom) Will Powell | 6 |
Class F
| (United Kingdom) RVR Motorsport | Porsche 997 | Porsche 3.6 L Flat-6 | 14 | (United Kingdom) Jake McAleer | All |
| (United Kingdom) RVR Motorsport | Porsche 997 | Porsche 3.6 L Flat-6 | 14 | (United Kingdom) Mark McAleer | All |
| (United Kingdom) Whitebridge Motorsport | BMW M3 GTR | BMW 3.0 L I6 | 72 | (United Kingdom) Chris Murphy | 6 |
| (United Kingdom) Newbarn Racing | Jaguar F-Type S | Jaguar 3.0 L V6 | 88 | (United Kingdom) Adam Thompson | 1, 3–6 |
| (United Kingdom) Newbarn Racing | Jaguar F-Type S | Jaguar 3.0 L V6 | 88 | (United Kingdom) Callum Thompson | 1, 3–6 |

== Race results ==
Bold indicates overall winner.

| Round | Circuit | Pole position | Fastest lap | Winning A | Winning B | Winning C | Winning D | Winning E | Winning F |
|---|---|---|---|---|---|---|---|---|---|
| 1 | Silverstone GP | (United Kingdom) No. 555 FF Corse | (United Kingdom) No. 160 Rob Boston Racing | **(United Kingdom) No. 24 Race Lab** | (Switzerland) No. 19 Bovet Racing with Race-Lab | (United Kingdom) No. 9 PB Racing | (United Kingdom) No. 68 Team BRIT | (United Kingdom) No. 60 EDF Motorsports | (United Kingdom) No. 14 RVR Motorsport |
| 1 | Silverstone GP | (United Kingdom) John Seale (United Kingdom) Jamie Stanley | (United Kingdom) Tom Jackson (United Kingdom) Wayne Marrs | **(United Kingdom) Lee Frost** **(United Kingdom) Lucky Khera** | (Switzerland) Claude Bovet (United Kingdom) David McDonald | (United Kingdom) Marcus Clutton (United Kingdom) Peter Erceg | (United Kingdom) Luke Pound (United Kingdom) Andy Tucker | (United Kingdom) Martin Byford (United Kingdom) Ashley Woodman | (United Kingdom) Jake McAleer (United Kingdom) Mark McAleer |
| 2 | Oulton Park | (United Kingdom) No. 160 Rob Boston Racing | (United Kingdom) No. 160 Rob Boston Racing | **(United Kingdom) No. 160 Rob Boston Racing** | (United Kingdom) No. 89 Balfe Motorsport with FastAF Racing | (United Kingdom) No. 51 Valluga Racing | (United Kingdom) No. 36 Team HARD. Racing | (United Kingdom) No. 94 Motus One with Maximum Motorsport | (United Kingdom) No. 14 RVR Motorsport |
| 2 | Oulton Park | (United Kingdom) Tom Jackson (United Kingdom) Wayne Marrs | (United Kingdom) Tom Jackson (United Kingdom) Wayne Marrs | **(United Kingdom) Tom Jackson** **(United Kingdom) Wayne Marrs** | (United Kingdom) Angus Fender | (United Kingdom) Carl Cavers (United Kingdom) Lewis Plato | (United Kingdom) Ray Harris (United Kingdom) Michael McPherson | (Republic of Ireland) Rob Butler (United Kingdom) Stewart Lines | (United Kingdom) Jake McAleer (United Kingdom) Mark McAleer |
| 3 | Snetterton Circuit | (United Kingdom) No. 24 7TSIX | (United Kingdom) No. 24 7TSIX | **(United Kingdom) No. 24 7TSIX** | (United Kingdom) No. 23 Mtech | (United Kingdom) No. 51 Valluga Racing | (United Kingdom) No. 7 Valluga Racing | (United Kingdom) No. 26 Corten-Millar Motorsport | (United Kingdom) No. 88 Newbarn Racing |
| 3 | Snetterton Circuit | (United Kingdom) Euan Hankey (United Kingdom) Lucky Khera | (United Kingdom) Euan Hankey (United Kingdom) Lucky Khera | **(United Kingdom) Euan Hankey** **(United Kingdom) Lucky Khera** | (United Kingdom) Iain Campbell (United Kingdom) Oliver Webb | (United Kingdom) Carl Cavers (United Kingdom) Lewis Plato | (United Kingdom) Jake Little (United Kingdom) James Little | (United Kingdom) William Casswell (United Kingdom) Brad Kaylor | (United Kingdom) Adam Thompson (United Kingdom) Callum Thompson |
| 4 | Silverstone GP | (United Kingdom) No. 92 Simpsons Motorsport | (United Kingdom) No. 160 Rob Boston Racing | **(United Kingdom) No. 160 Rob Boston Racing** | (Switzerland) No. 19 Bovet Racing with Race-Lab | (United Kingdom) No. 144 RNR Performance Cars | (United Kingdom) No. 98 Race Lab | (United Kingdom) No. 60 EDF Motorsports | (United Kingdom) No. 14 RVR Motorsport |
| 4 | Silverstone GP | (United Kingdom) Hugo Cook (United Kingdom) Sacha Kakad | (United Kingdom) Tom Jackson (United Kingdom) Wayne Marrs | **(United Kingdom) Tom Jackson** **(United Kingdom) Wayne Marrs** | (Switzerland) Claude Bovet (United Kingdom) David McDonald | (United Kingdom) Chris Compton-Goddard (United Kingdom) Bradley Ellis | (United Kingdom) Ian Gough (United Kingdom) Euan Hankey | (United Kingdom) Martin Byford (United Kingdom) Ashley Woodman | (United Kingdom) Jake McAleer (United Kingdom) Mark McAleer |
| 5 | Donington Park National | (United Kingdom) No. 160 Rob Boston Racing | (United Kingdom) No. 92 Simpsons Motorsport | **(United Kingdom) No. 160 Rob Boston Racing** | No starters | (United Kingdom) No. 144 RNR Performance Cars | (United Kingdom) No. 77 Motus One Racing | (United Kingdom) No. 87 Sheard Autosport | (United Kingdom) No. 14 RVR Motorsport |
| 5 | Donington Park National | (United Kingdom) Tom Jackson (United Kingdom) Wayne Marrs | (United Kingdom) Hugo Cook (United Kingdom) Sacha Kakad | **(United Kingdom) Tom Jackson** **(United Kingdom) Wayne Marrs** | No starters | (United Kingdom) Chris Compton-Goddard (United Kingdom) Bradley Ellis (United Kingdom) Jamie Stanley | (United Kingdom) Matt Cherrington (United Kingdom) Will Powell | (United Kingdom) Jonathan Beeson | (United Kingdom) Jake McAleer (United Kingdom) Mark McAleer |
| 6 | Donington Park GP | (United Kingdom) No. 160 Rob Boston Racing | (United Kingdom) No. 92 Simpsons Motorsport | **(United Kingdom) No. 160 Rob Boston Racing** | No entries | (United Kingdom) No. 9 PB Racing | (United Kingdom) No. 50 MKH Racing | (United Kingdom) No. 44 CTR Alfatune | (United Kingdom) No. 14 RVR Motorsport |
| 6 | Donington Park GP | (United Kingdom) Tom Jackson (United Kingdom) Wayne Marrs | (United Kingdom) Hugo Cook (United Kingdom) Sacha Kakad | **(United Kingdom) Tom Jackson** **(United Kingdom) Wayne Marrs** | No entries | (United Kingdom) Marcus Clutton (United Kingdom) Peter Erceg | (United Kingdom) Daniel Brown (United Kingdom) Stuart Hall (United Kingdom) Peter Montague | (United Kingdom) Alex Day (United Kingdom) William Foster | (United Kingdom) Jake McAleer (United Kingdom) Mark McAleer |

== Championship standings ==
=== Overall ===
Points are awarded as follows in all classes:

| System | 1st | 2nd | 3rd | 4th | 5th | 6th | 7th | 8th | 9th | 10th | 11th | 12th | 13th | 14th | 15th | PP | FL |
|---|---|---|---|---|---|---|---|---|---|---|---|---|---|---|---|---|---|
| +2 | 30 | 27 | 25 | 20 | 19 | 18 | 17 | 16 | 15 | 14 | 13 | 12 | 11 | 10 | 9 | 1 | 1 |

| System | 1st | 2nd | PP | FL |
|---|---|---|---|---|
| -2 | 20 | 17 | 1 | 1 |

| Pos. | Drivers | No. | Class | SIL1 | OUL | SNE | SIL2 | DON1 | DON2 | Pts |
|---|---|---|---|---|---|---|---|---|---|---|
| 1 | (United Kingdom) Tom Jackson (United Kingdom) Wayne Marrs | 160 | A | 23 | 1 | 2 | 1 | 1 | 1 | 173 |
| 2 | (United Kingdom) Chris Compton-Goddard | 144 | C | 7 | 3 | 18 | 13 | 4 | 6 | 171 |
| 2 | (United Kingdom) Charlie Hollings | 144 | C | 7 | 3 | 18 | | 4 | 6 | 171 |
| 2 | (United Kingdom) Bradley Ellis | 144 | C | | | | 13 | | | 171 |
| 2 | (United Kingdom) Jamie Stanley | 144 | C | | | | | 4 | 6 | 171 |
| 3 | (United Kingdom) Peter Montague | 50 | D | 12 | 15 | 16 | 7 | 10 | 11 | 165 |
| 3 | (United Kingdom) Stuart Hall | 50 | D | 12 | 15 | 16 | | 10 | 11 | 165 |
| 3 | (United Kingdom) Daniel Brown | 50 | D | | | 16 | | | 11 | 165 |
| 4 | (United Kingdom) Josh Hislop | 36 | D | 13 | 8 | 15 | 14 | 20 | | 155 |
| 4 | (United Kingdom) Michael McPherson | 36 | D | 13 | 8 | 15 | | | | 155 |
| 4 | (United Kingdom) Ray Harris | 36 | D | 13 | | | 14 | | | 155 |
| 4 | (United Kingdom) Sam Randon | 36 | D | | | | | 20 | 18 | 155 |
| 4 | (United Kingdom) Will Orton | 36 | D | | | | | | 18 | 155 |
| 5 | (United Kingdom) Carl Cavers (United Kingdom) Lewis Plato | 51 | C | 6 | 5 | 5 | 22 | 16 | 10 | 149 |
| 6 | (United Kingdom) Alex Day (United Kingdom) William Foster | 44 | E | 18 | 22 | 10 | 9 | 12 | 13 | 149 |
| 7 | (United Kingdom) Andy Tucker | 68 | D | 11 | 9 | 25 | 17 | 14 | 21 | 142 |
| 7 | (United Kingdom) Luke Pound | 68 | D | 11 | 9 | 25 | 17 | | | 142 |
| 7 | (United Kingdom) Chris Overend | 68 | D | | | | | 14 | | 142 |
| 7 | (United Kingdom) James Whitley | 68 | D | | | | | | 21 | 142 |
| 8 | (United Kingdom) Jonathan Beeson | 87 | E | 9 | 24 | 12 | 20 | 11 | 19 | 139 |
| 8 | (United Kingdom) George Heler | 87 | E | 9 | 24 | 12 | 20 | | 19 | 139 |
| 9 | (United Kingdom) Kevin Clarke | 55 | A | 4 | 23 | 8 | 3 | 21 | 7 | 135 |
| 9 | (United Kingdom) Ian Lawson | 55 | A | 4 | | 8 | 3 | 21 | 7 | 135 |
| 9 | (United Kingdom) Ryan Lindsay | 55 | A | | 23 | 8 | 3 | 21 | | 135 |
| 10 | (United Kingdom) Jake McAleer (United Kingdom) Mark McAleer | 14 | F | 20 | 20 | 23 | 21 | 17 | 16 | 132 |
| 11 | (United Kingdom) Richard Avery (United Kingdom) Nick Hull | 22 | E | 14 | 19 | 11 | 19 | 15 | 15 | 131 |
| 12 | (United Kingdom) Marcus Clutton (United Kingdom) Peter Erceg | 9 | C | 5 | DNS | 26 | | 5 | 5 | 118 |
| 13 | (United Kingdom) Lucky Khera | 24 | A | 1 | DNS | 1 | | 3 | 2 | 114 |
| 13 | (United Kingdom) Lee Frost | 24 | A | 1 | DNS | | | 3 | 2 | 114 |
| 13 | (United Kingdom) Euan Hankey | 24 | A | | | 1 | | | | 114 |
| 14 | (United Kingdom) Martin Byford (United Kingdom) Ashley Woodman | 60 | E | 8 | DNS | 9 | 6 | 18 | Ret | 114 |
| 15 | (United Kingdom) Stewart Lines | 94 | E | 15 | 13 | 13 | | 22 | | 112 |
| 15 | (United Kingdom) Anton Spires | 94 | E | 15 | | 13 | | 22 | Ret | 112 |
| 15 | (Republic of Ireland) Rob Butler | 94 | E | | 13 | | | | | 112 |
| 15 | (United Kingdom) Matt Cherrington (United Kingdom) Will Powell | 94 | E | | | | 16 | | | 112 |
| 15 | (United Kingdom) Scott Symons | 94 | E | | | | | | Ret | 112 |
| 16 | (Switzerland) Claude Bovets (United Kingdom) David McDonald | 19 | B | 3 | 7 | 4 | 4 | DNS | | 102 |
| 17 | (United Kingdom) Adam Thompson (United Kingdom) Callum Thompson | 88 | F | 27 | | 19 | 23 | 24 | 20 | 99 |
| 18 | (United Kingdom) Jake Little (United Kingdom) James Little | 7 | D | 14 | 10 | 6 | 25 | | | 93 |
| 19 | (United Kingdom) Steve Tomkins | 6 | A | 2 | 12 | 24 | | | 9 | 91 |
| 19 | (Latvia) Gleb Stepanovs | 6 | A | 2 | 12 | | | | 9 | 91 |
| 19 | (United Kingdom) Matt George | 6 | A | | | 24 | | | | 91 |
| 20 | (New Zealand) Dave Benett (United Kingdom) Marcus Fothergill | 69 | C | 25 | 21 | | | 6 | 8 | 88 |
| 20 | (United Kingdom) Johnny Mowlem | 69 | C | 25 | | | | 6 | 8 | 88 |
| 20 | (United Kingdom) Nigel Moore | 69 | C | | 21 | | | | | 88 |
| 21 | (United Kingdom) Neville Jones (United Kingdom) Matt George | 21 | D | | | | 8 | 9 | 12 | 88 |
| 22 | (United Kingdom) Rhys Lloyd | 66 | E | 18 | 16 | 17 | 12 | Ret | | 87 |
| 22 | (United Kingdom) Max Coates | 66 | E | 18 | 16 | | 12 | Ret | | 87 |
| 22 | (Switzerland) Yannick Mettler | 66 | E | | | 17 | | | | 87 |
| 23 | (United Kingdom) Hugo Cook (United Kingdom) Sacha Kakad | 92 | A | | | | 2 | 2 | 4 | 82 |
| 24 | (United Kingdom) James Simons (United Kingdom) Fraser Smart | 41 | B | 19 | | | | | | 69 |
| 24 | (United Kingdom) Chris Kemp | 41 | B | | | 22 | 11 | | | 69 |
| 24 | (Denmark) Benny Simonsen | 41 | B | | | 22 | | | | 69 |
| 24 | (United Kingdom) Daniel Brown | 41 | B | | | | 11 | | | 69 |
| 25 | (United Kingdom) Jonny MacGregor | 3 | A | 26 | 2 | 21 | | Ret | | 66 |
| 25 | (United Kingdom) Ben Sharich | 3 | A | 26 | 2 | 21 | | | | 66 |
| 26 | (United Kingdom) Dale Albutt (United Kingdom) Mark Albutt | 33 | D | 21 | 17 | | 18 | | | 57 |
| 27 | (United Kingdom) Callum Jenkins (United Kingdom) Ollie Turner | 222 | C | 10 | 4 | | | | | 48 |
| 28 | (United Kingdom) Mark Cunningham (United Kingdom) Peter Cunningham | 32 | C | | | | 15 | 7 | | 47 |
| 29 | (Republic of Ireland) Max Hart (United Kingdom) Mark Havers | 63 | E | | | 14 | | 13 | | 42 |
| 30 | (New Zealand) Grant Dalton | 35 | D | | | | 24 | 19 | | 38 |
| 30 | (New Zealand) Grant Woolford | 35 | D | | | | 24 | | | 38 |
| 30 | (United Kingdom) James Breakell | 35 | D | | | | | 19 | | 38 |
| 31 | (United Kingdom) William Caswell (United Kingdom) Brad Kaylor | 26 | E | | | 8 | | | | 30 |
| 32 | (United Kingdom) John Seale (United Kingdom) Jamie Stanley | 555 | B | 16 | | | | | | 28 |
| 33 | (United Kingdom) Johnny Mowlem (Ghana) William Tewiah | 23 | B | | | | 10 | | | 27 |
| 34 | (United Kingdom) Angus Fender | 89 | B | | 6 | | | | | 20 |
| 35 | (United Kingdom) Mike Moss (United Kingdom) Chris Murphy | 18 | C | 24 | | | | | | 19 |
| 36 | (United Kingdom) Will Powell (United Kingdom) Dave Scaramanga | 1 | A | DNS | | | | | | 18 |
| 36 | (United Kingdom) Will Powell (United Kingdom) Dave Scaramanga | 77 | D | | 18 | | | | | 18 |
| 37 | (United Kingdom) Chris Murphy | 72 | F | | | | | | Ret | 1 |
invitational drivers ineligible for points
| | (United Kingdom) Oliver Webb | 23 | B | | | 3 | | | | 0 |
| | (United Kingdom) Oliver Webb | 23 | A | | | | | | 3 | 0 |
| | (United Kingdom) Iain Campbell | 23 | B | | | 3 | | | | 0 |
| | (United Kingdom) Michael Broadhurst | 23 | A | | | | | | 3 | 0 |
| | (United Kingdom) Matt Cherrington (United Kingdom) Will Powell | 77 | D | | | | | 8 | | 0 |
| | (United Kingdom) Will Powell (United Kingdom) Brad Thurston | 40 | E | | | | | | 14 | 0 |
| | (United Kingdom) Ian Gough (United Kingdom) Euan Hankey | 98 | D | | | | 5 | | | 0 |
| | (United Kingdom) Chris Murphy (United Kingdom) Ray Harris | 5 | C | | 11 | | | | | 0 |
| | (United Kingdom) Aaron Morgan (United Kingdom) Bobby Trundley | 168 | D | | 14 | | | | | 0 |
| | (Italy) Andrea Amici (United Kingdom) John Dhillon | 61 | A | | | 20 | | | | 0 |
| | (United Kingdom) Simon Tomlinson | 40 | E | | | | | 23 | 17 | 0 |
| Pos. | Drivers | No. | Class | SIL1 | OUL | SNE | SIL2 | DON1 | DON2 | Pts |

=== Classes ===
Points are awarded as follows in all classes:

| System | 1st | 2nd | 3rd | 4th | 5th | 6th | 7th | 8th | 9th | 10th | 11th | 12th | 13th | 14th | 15th | PP | FL |
|---|---|---|---|---|---|---|---|---|---|---|---|---|---|---|---|---|---|
| +2 | 30 | 27 | 25 | 20 | 19 | 18 | 17 | 16 | 15 | 14 | 13 | 12 | 11 | 10 | 9 | 1 | 1 |

| System | 1st | 2nd | PP | FL |
|---|---|---|---|---|
| -2 | 20 | 17 | 1 | 1 |

| Pos. | Drivers | No. | SIL1 | OUL | SNE | SIL2 | DON1 | DON2 | Pts |
Class A
| 1 | (United Kingdom) Tom Jackson (United Kingdom) Wayne Marrs | 160 | 23 | 1 | 2 | 1 | 1 | 1 | 173 |
| 2 | (United Kingdom) Kevin Clarke | 55 | 4 | 23 | 8 | 3 | 21 | 7 | 135 |
| 2 | (United Kingdom) Ian Lawson | 55 | 4 | | 8 | 3 | 21 | 7 | 135 |
| 2 | (United Kingdom) Ryan Lindsay | 55 | | 23 | 8 | 3 | 21 | | 135 |
| 3 | (United Kingdom) Lucky Khera | 24 | 1 | DNS | 1 | | 3 | 2 | 114 |
| 3 | (United Kingdom) Lee Frost | 24 | 1 | DNS | | | 3 | 2 | 114 |
| 3 | (United Kingdom) Euan Hankey | 24 | | | 1 | | | | 114 |
| 4 | (United Kingdom) Steve Tomkins | 6 | 2 | 12 | 24 | | | 9 | 91 |
| 4 | (Latvia) Gleb Stepanovs | 6 | 2 | 12 | | | | 9 | 91 |
| 4 | (United Kingdom) Matt George | 6 | | | 24 | | | | 91 |
| 5 | (United Kingdom) Hugo Cook (United Kingdom) Sacha Kakad | 92 | | | | 2 | 2 | 4 | 82 |
| 6 | (United Kingdom) Jonny MacGregor | 3 | 26 | 2 | 21 | | Ret | | 66 |
| 6 | (United Kingdom) Ben Sharich | 3 | 26 | 2 | 21 | | | | 66 |
| | (United Kingdom) Will Powell (United Kingdom) Dave Scaramanga | 1 | DNS | | | | | | 0 |
invitational drivers ineligible for points
| | (United Kingdom) Michael Broadhurst (United Kingdom) Oliver Webb | 23 | | | | | | 3 | 0 |
| | (Italy) Andrea Amici (United Kingdom) John Dhillon | 61 | | | 20 | | | | 0 |
Class B
| 1 | (Switzerland) Claude Bovets (United Kingdom) David McDonald | 19 | 3 | 7 | 4 | 4 | DNS | | 102 |
| 2 | (United Kingdom) James Simons (United Kingdom) Fraser Smart | 41 | 19 | | | | | | 69 |
| 2 | (United Kingdom) Chris Kemp | 41 | | | 22 | 11 | | | 69 |
| 2 | (Denmark) Benny Simonsen | 41 | | | 22 | | | | 69 |
| 2 | (United Kingdom) Daniel Brown | 41 | | | | 11 | | | 69 |
| 3 | (United Kingdom) John Seale (United Kingdom) Jamie Stanley | 555 | 16 | | | | | | 28 |
| 4 | (United Kingdom) Johnny Mowlem (Ghana) William Tewiah | 23 | | | | 10 | | | 27 |
| 5 | (United Kingdom) Angus Fender | 89 | | 6 | | | | | 20 |
invitational drivers ineligible for points
| | (United Kingdom) Iain Campbell (United Kingdom) Oliver Webb | 23 | | | 3 | | | | 0 |
Class C
| 1 | (United Kingdom) Chris Compton-Goddard | 144 | 7 | 3 | 18 | 13 | 4 | 6 | 171 |
| 1 | (United Kingdom) Charlie Hollings | 144 | 7 | 3 | 18 | | 4 | 6 | 171 |
| 1 | (United Kingdom) Bradley Ellis | 144 | | | | 13 | | | 171 |
| 1 | (United Kingdom) Jamie Stanley | 144 | | | | | 4 | 6 | 171 |
| 2 | (United Kingdom) Carl Cavers (United Kingdom) Lewis Plato | 51 | 6 | 5 | 5 | 22 | 16 | 10 | 149 |
| 3 | (United Kingdom) Marcus Clutton (United Kingdom) Peter Erceg | 9 | 5 | DNS | 26 | | 5 | 5 | 118 |
| 4 | (New Zealand) Dave Benett (United Kingdom) Marcus Fothergill | 69 | 25 | 21 | | | 6 | 8 | 88 |
| 4 | (United Kingdom) Johnny Mowlem | 69 | 25 | | | | 6 | 8 | 88 |
| 4 | (United Kingdom) Nigel Moore | 69 | | 21 | | | | | 88 |
| 5 | (United Kingdom) Callum Jenkins (United Kingdom) Ollie Turner | 222 | 10 | 4 | | | | | 48 |
| 6 | (United Kingdom) Mark Cunningham (United Kingdom) Peter Cunningham | 32 | | | | 15 | 7 | | 47 |
| 7 | (United Kingdom) Mike Moss (United Kingdom) Chris Murphy | 18 | 24 | | | | | | 19 |
invitational drivers ineligible for points
| | (United Kingdom) Chris Murphy (United Kingdom) Ray Harris | 5 | | 11 | | | | | 0 |
Class D
| 1 | (United Kingdom) Peter Montague | 50 | 12 | 15 | 16 | 7 | 10 | 11 | 165 |
| 1 | (United Kingdom) Stuart Hall | 50 | 12 | 15 | | 7 | 10 | 11 | 165 |
| 1 | (United Kingdom) Daniel Brown | 50 | | | 16 | | | 11 | 165 |
| 2 | (United Kingdom) Josh Hislop | 36 | 13 | 8 | 15 | 14 | 20 | | 155 |
| 2 | (United Kingdom) Michael McPherson | 36 | 13 | 8 | 15 | | | | 155 |
| 2 | (United Kingdom) Ray Harris | 36 | 13 | | | 14 | | | 155 |
| 2 | (United Kingdom) Sam Randon | 36 | | | | | 20 | 18 | 155 |
| 2 | (United Kingdom) Will Orton | 36 | | | | | | 18 | 155 |
| 3 | (United Kingdom) Andy Tucker | 68 | 11 | 9 | 25 | 17 | 14 | 21 | 142 |
| 3 | (United Kingdom) Luke Pound | 68 | 11 | 9 | 25 | 17 | | | 142 |
| 3 | (United Kingdom) Chris Overend | 68 | | | | | 14 | | 142 |
| 3 | (United Kingdom) James Whitley | 68 | | | | | | 21 | 142 |
| 4 | (United Kingdom) Jake Little (United Kingdom) James Little | 7 | 14 | 10 | 6 | 25 | | | 93 |
| 5 | (United Kingdom) Neville Jones (United Kingdom) Matt George | 21 | | | | 8 | 9 | 12 | 88 |
| 6 | (United Kingdom) Dale Albutt (United Kingdom) Mark Albutt | 33 | 21 | 17 | | 18 | | | 57 |
| 7 | (New Zealand) Grant Dalton | 35 | | | | 24 | 19 | | 38 |
| 7 | (New Zealand) Grant Woolford | 35 | | | | 24 | | | 38 |
| 7 | (United Kingdom) James Breakell | 35 | | | | | 19 | | 38 |
| 8 | (United Kingdom) Will Powell (United Kingdom) Dave Scaramanga | 77 | | 18 | | | | | 18 |
invitational drivers ineligible for points
| | (United Kingdom) Ian Gough (United Kingdom) Euan Hankey | 98 | | | | 5 | | | 0 |
| | (United Kingdom) Matt Cherrington (United Kingdom) Will Powell | 77 | | | | | 8 | | 0 |
| | (United Kingdom) Aaron Morgan (United Kingdom) Bobby Trundley | 168 | | 14 | | | | | 0 |
Class E
| 1 | (United Kingdom) Alex Day (United Kingdom) William Foster | 44 | 18 | 22 | 10 | 9 | 12 | 13 | 149 |
| 2 | (United Kingdom) Jonathan Beeson | 87 | 9 | 24 | 12 | 20 | 11 | 19 | 139 |
| 2 | (United Kingdom) George Heler | 87 | 9 | 24 | 12 | 20 | | 19 | 139 |
| 3 | (United Kingdom) Richard Avery (United Kingdom) Nick Hull | 22 | 14 | 19 | 11 | 19 | 15 | 15 | 131 |
| 4 | (United Kingdom) Martin Byford (United Kingdom) Ashley Woodman | 60 | 8 | DNS | 9 | 6 | 18 | Ret | 114 |
| 5 | (United Kingdom) Stewart Lines | 94 | 15 | 13 | 13 | | 22 | | 112 |
| 5 | (United Kingdom) Anton Spires | 94 | 15 | | 13 | | 22 | Ret | 112 |
| 5 | (Republic of Ireland) Rob Butler | 94 | | 13 | | | | | 112 |
| 5 | (United Kingdom) Matt Cherrington (United Kingdom) Will Powell | 94 | | | | 16 | | | 112 |
| 5 | (United Kingdom) Scott Symons | 94 | | | | | | Ret | 112 |
| 6 | (United Kingdom) Rhys Lloyd | 66 | 18 | 16 | 17 | 12 | Ret | | 87 |
| 6 | (United Kingdom) Max Coates | 66 | 18 | 16 | | 12 | Ret | | 87 |
| 6 | (Switzerland) Yannick Mettler | 66 | | | 17 | | | | 87 |
| 7 | (Republic of Ireland) Max Hart (United Kingdom) Mark Havers | 63 | | | 14 | | 13 | | 42 |
| 8 | (United Kingdom) William Caswell (United Kingdom) Brad Kaylor | 26 | | | 8 | | | | 30 |
invitational drivers ineligible for points
| | (United Kingdom) Will Powell (United Kingdom) Brad Thurston | 40 | | | | | | 14 | 0 |
| | (United Kingdom) Simon Tomlinson | 40 | | | | | 23 | 17 | 0 |
Class F
| 1 | (United Kingdom) Jake McAleer (United Kingdom) Mark McAleer | 14 | 20 | 20 | 23 | 21 | 17 | 16 | 132 |
| 2 | (United Kingdom) Adam Thompson (United Kingdom) Callum Thompson | 88 | 27 | | 19 | 23 | 24 | 20 | 99 |
| 3 | (United Kingdom) Chris Murphy | 72 | | | | | | Ret | 1 |
| Pos. | Drivers | No. | SIL1 | OUL | SNE | SIL2 | DON1 | DON2 | Pts |
