= Euan Hankey =

British racing driver (born 1987)

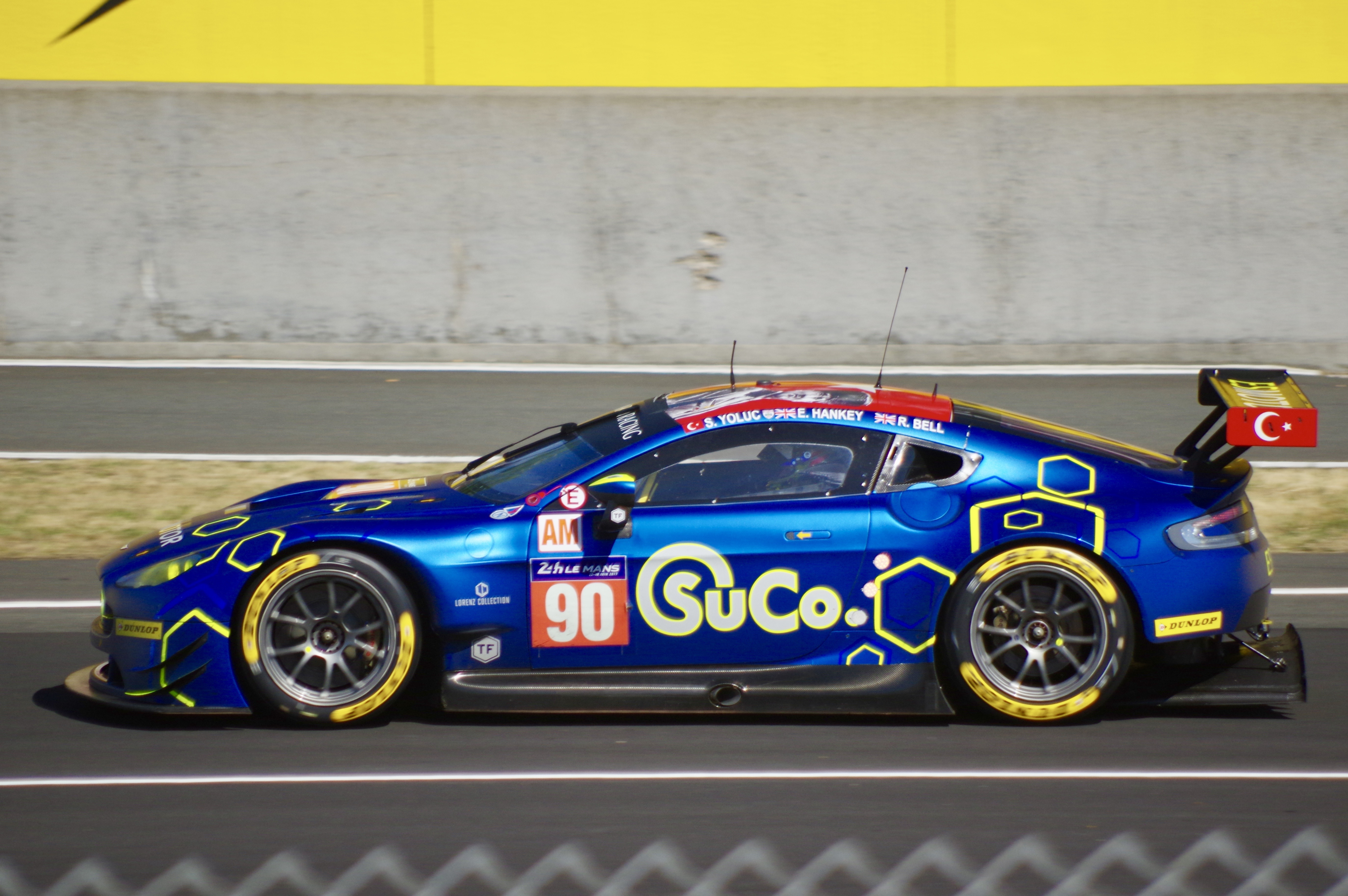
- Hankey in 2017
- Nationality: (United Kingdom) British
- Born: 18 March 1987 (age 39) Taunton, United Kingdom
- Categorisation: FIA Silver (until 2017); FIA Gold (2018–)

Championship titles
- 2020: British GT Championship – GT4 Pro-Am

Euan Richard Alers-Hankey (born 18 March 1987) is a British racing driver who last competed in Lamborghini Super Trofeo Europe for VSR.

== Career ==
Hankey began racing single-seaters in 2005, competing in Formula BMW UK for Barwell Motorsport. After continuing in Formula BMW UK the following year, Hankey raced in Formula 3 Euro Series in 2007, before making part-time appearances in Formula Renault 2.0 UK and Formula Renault BARC in 2009 and 2010, respectively. Also in 2010, Hankey began racing full-time in Porsche Carrera Cup Great Britain for Team Parker Racing, scoring eight podiums as he ended the year fifth in points. Remaining in the series for the following year, Hankey began the year by winning at Brands Hatch, before taking wins at Donington Park and Knockhill, and winning both races at Rockingham en route to a fourth-place points finish.

After being on the sidelines for the next two years and select appearances in the 2014 Britcar Endurance Championship, Hankey joined Von Ryan Racing to compete in the British GT Championship the following year. During 2015, Hankey also raced for TF Sport in select appearances in International GT Open, Blancpain Endurance Series' Pro-Am and the European Le Mans Series' GTC class. Hankey returned to TF Sport for 2016, racing an Aston Martin Vantage GT3 in both International GT Open and the GT3 Le Mans Cup. Racing in the Pro-Am class of the former, Hankey scored overall wins at Silverstone and Monza en route to a seventh-place points finish. In the latter, Hankey won at Imola and Estoril and scored three more podiums to secure runner-up honors.

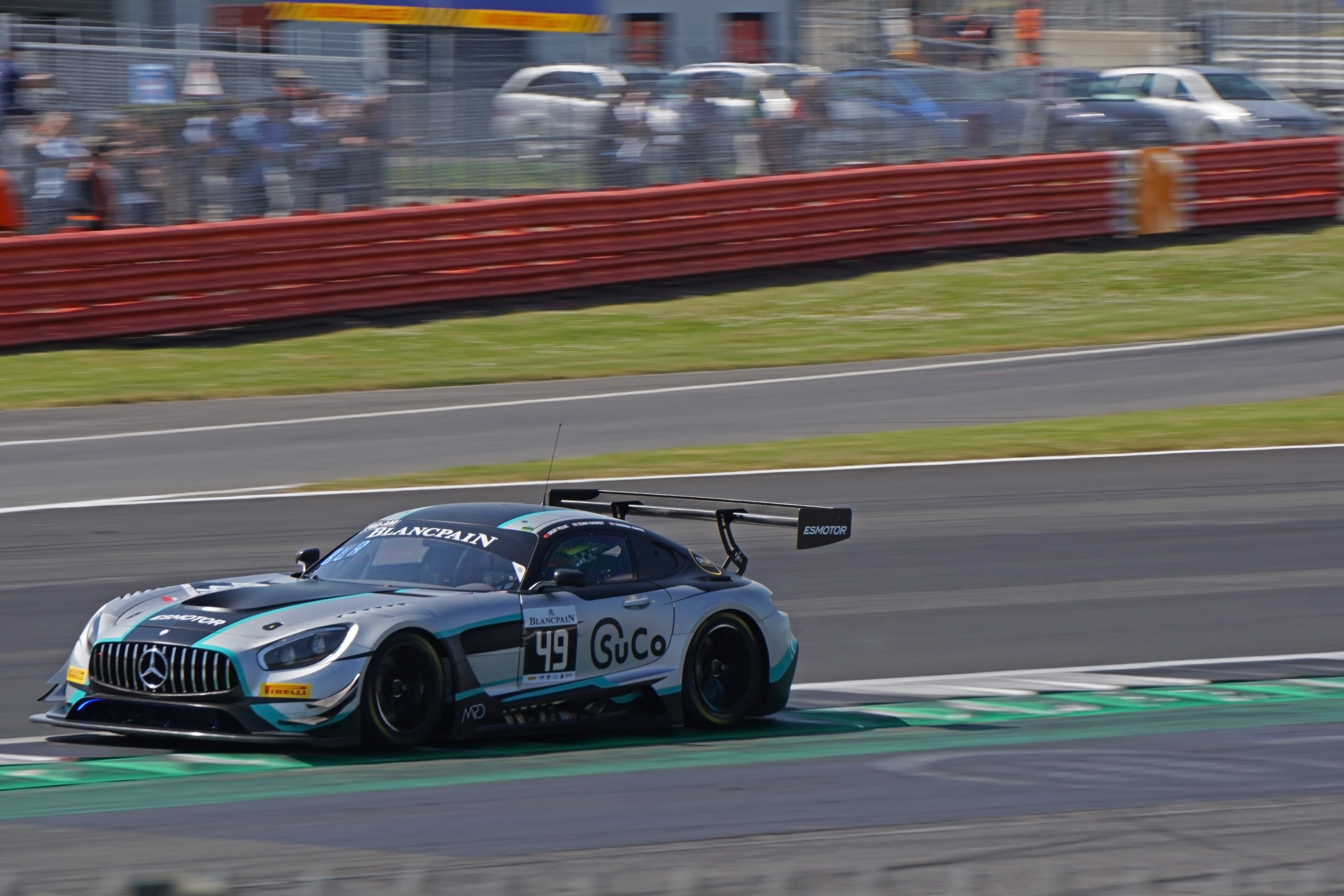
Hankey aboard his Ram Racing Mercedes at Silverstone during the 2018 Blancpain season.

Remaining with TF Sport for 2017, Hankey raced with them in the LMGTE class of the European Le Mans Series. In his only season in the series, Hankey won in class at Silverstone and finished on the podium four more times to end the year runner-up in points. During 2017, Hankey also raced with the team at the 24 Hours of Le Mans and the 24 Hours of Spa. The following year, Hankey joined Mercedes-linked Ram Racing to compete in the Blancpain GT Series Endurance Cup, scoring a Pro-Am class win at Silverstone as he ended the year 11th in class. The same year, Hankey remained with TF Sport to compete in select rounds of the 2018–19 FIA World Endurance Championship in LMGTE Am, scoring a best result of second in the 2018 and 2019 editions of the 6 Hours of Spa-Francorchamps.

In 2020, Hankey became a McLaren Factory GT driver, and joined Balfe Motorsport to race in the GT4 Pro-Am class of the British GT Championship. In his only full-time season in the category, Hankey won all but one race to secure the title. After a part-time campaign the following year for Jenson Team Rocket RJN in GT3 Pro-Am, Hankey joined 7TSIX in 2022 for his only full season in the GT3 Pro-Am class of the British GT Championship. After scoring a best result of fourth at Donington Park and ending the year tenth in points, Hankey switched to Race Lab for the following year, and scored his only overall podium in the series at the same venue en route to a 14th-place points finish. Following that, Hankey remained with Race Lab the following year to compete at the 6 Hours of Abu Dhabi and in select races of the British GT Championship. In 2026, Hankey joined VSR to compete in Lamborghini Super Trofeo Europe alongside Finley Green from round two onwards.

== Personal life ==
In 2007, Hankey was given a 16-month driving ban from public roads after drinking and driving.

== Karting record ==
=== Karting career summary ===
Season	Series	Team	Position
2001	Super One Series — Rotax Junior		6th
2001	Kartmasters British GP — Rotax Junior		1st
2002	Super One Series — Rotax Junior		4th
2002	ABkC National Open — Rotax Junior		1st

== Racing record ==
=== Racing career summary ===
Season	Series	Team	Races	Wins	Poles	F/Laps	Podiums	Points	Position
2005	Formula BMW UK	Barwell Motorsport	20	0	0	1	0	38	12th
2005	Formula BMW World Final	Nexa Racing	1	0	0	0	0	—N/a	DNF
2006	Formula BMW UK	Fortec Motorsport	20	2	1	5	7	188	4th
2006	Formula BMW World Final	Fortec Motorsport	1	0	0	0	0	—N/a	10th
2007	Formula 3 Euro Series	HS Technik	10	0	0	0	0	0	23rd
2009	Formula Renault 2.0 UK Championship	CRS Racing	6	0	0	0	0	100	17th
2010	Formula Renault BARC	Antel Motorsport	2	1	0	0	1	44	17th
2010	Porsche Carrera Cup Great Britain	Team Parker Racing	20	0	1	0	8	210	5th
2010	Porsche Supercup	Porsche AG	1	0	0	0	0	0	NC
2011	Porsche Carrera Cup Great Britain	Team Parker Racing	19	5	3	0	10	241	4th
2011	Porsche Carrera World Cup	Parker with Juta	1	0	0	0	0	—N/a	DNF
2014	Britcar Endurance Championship – Class 3	Optimum Motorsport	4	2	0	0	3	83	6th
2015	24H Series – SP3	Optimum Motorsport	1	1	0	0	1	0	NC
2015	British GT Championship – GT3	Von Ryan Racing	4	0	0	0	0	6	20th
2015	International GT Open – Am	TF Sport	4	3	1	2	3	19	6th
2015	International GT Open – Pro-Am	TF Sport	2	0	0	0	0	0	NC
2015	Blancpain Endurance Series – Pro-Am	TF Sport	1	0	0	0	0	0	NC
2015	European Le Mans Series – GTC	TF Sport	1	0	0	0	0	10	11th
2016	International GT Open – Pro-Am	TF Sport	12	2	1	0	3	37	7th
2016	GT3 Le Mans Cup	TF Sport	6	2	0	0	5	107	**2nd**
2016	Blancpain GT Series Endurance Cup – Pro-Am	Black Falcon	1	0	0	0	0	0	NC
2017	European Le Mans Series – LMGTE	TF Sport	6	1	1	0	5	102	**2nd**
2017	24 Hours of Le Mans – LMGTE Am	TF Sport	1	0	0	0	0	—N/a	7th
2017	Blancpain GT Series Endurance Cup – Pro-Am	Oman Racing Team with TF Sport	1	0	1	0	1	40	11th
2017	Intercontinental GT Challenge	Oman Racing Team with TF Sport	1	0	0	0	0	0	NC
2018	24H GT Series – A6	Ram Racing	1	0	0	0	0	0	NC
2018	Blancpain GT Series Endurance Cup – Pro-Am	Ram Racing	4	1	2	0	1	40	11th
2018	24 Hours of Le Mans – LMGTE Am	TF Sport	1	0	0	0	0	—N/a	DNF
2018	British GT Championship – GT4 Pro-Am	Track-Club	1	0	0	0	0	0	NC
2018–19	FIA World Endurance Championship – LMGTE Am	TF Sport	4	0	1	0	2	49	13th
2019	24 Hours of Le Mans – LMGTE Am	TF Sport	1	0	0	0	0	—N/a	11th
2020	British GT Championship – GT4 Pro-Am	Balfe Motorsport	9	8	8	8	8	118.75	**1st**
2021	British GT Championship – GT3 Pro-Am	Jenson Team Rocket RJN	3	0	0	0	0	0†	NC†
2022	British GT Championship – GT3 Pro-Am	7TSIX	9	0	0	0	0	88	10th
2022	British Endurance Championship – Class A	7TSIX	1	1	1	1	1	114	**3rd**
2022	British Endurance Championship – Class D	Race Lab	1	0	0	0	0	0	NC
2022	GT Cup Championship – GTH	Greystone GT	26	3				318	4th
2023	British GT Championship – GT3 Pro-Am	Race Lab	7	0	0	0	1	34	14th
2023	GT Cup Championship – GT3	Race Lab	8	1	0	0	4	0	NC
2023–24	Middle East Trophy – GT3 Pro-Am	Race Lab	1	0	0	0	0	12	NC
2024	British GT Championship – GT3 Pro-Am	Race Lab	2	0	0	0	0	0	NC
2026	Lamborghini Super Trofeo Europe – Pro	VSR	7	0	0	0	0	18	11th
2026	Lamborghini Super Trofeo World Finals – Pro	VSR	2	0	0	0	0	0	NC

=== Complete Formula BMW UK results ===
(key) (Races in bold indicate pole position; races in italics indicate fastest lap)

Year	Entrant	1	2	3	4	5	6	7	8	9	10	11	12	13	14	15	16	17	18	19	20	DC	Pts
2005	Barwell Motorsport	DON; 1; 10	DON; 2; 8	THR; 1; 4	THR; 2 Ret	ROC; 1; 8	ROC; 2; 9	BHI; 1; 10	BHI; 2; 14	OUL; 1 Ret	OUL; 2; 6	CRO; 1; 15	CRO; 2 Ret	MON; 1; 4	MON; 2; 13	KNO; 1; 17	KNO; 2; 10	SIL; 1; 14	SIL; 2; 18	BHGP; 1; 11	BHGP; 2; 10	12th	38
2006	Fortec Motorsport	BHI; 1; 3	**BHI**; **2**; 1	MON; 1; 4	MON; 2 Ret	OUL; 1; 1	OUL; 2; 5	BHGP; 1; 4	BHGP; 2; 21	THR; 1; 3	THR; 2; 3	CRO; 1; 7	CRO; 2; 4	DON; 1; 2	DON; 2; 5	SNE; 1; 6	SNE; 2; 4	KNO; 1; 8	KNO; 2; 2	SIL; 1; 5	SIL; 2; 7	4th	188

=== Complete Formula 3 Euro Series results ===
(key) (Races in bold indicate pole position) (Races in italics indicate fastest lap)

Year	Entrant	Chassis	Engine	1	2	3	4	5	6	7	8	9	10	11	12	13	14	15	16	17	18	19	20	DC	Points
2007	HS Technik	Dallara F305/039	Mercedes	HOC1; 1	HOC1; 2	BRH; 1	BRH; 2	NOR; 1	NOR; 2	MAG; 1	MAG; 2	MUG; 1; 19	MUG; 2; 16	ZAN; 1; 17	ZAN; 2; 18	NÜR; 1 Ret	NÜR; 2; 16	CAT; 1 Ret	CAT; 2; 13	NOG; 1; 22	NOG; 2 Ret	HOC2; 1	HOC2; 2	23rd	0

=== Complete British GT Championship results ===
(key) (Races in bold indicate pole position) (Races in italics indicate fastest lap)

Year	Team	Car	Class	1	2	3	4	5	6	7	8	9	DC	Points
2015	Von Ryan Racing	McLaren 650S GT3	GT3 Pro-Am	OUL; 1 DSQ	OUL; 2 DNS	ROC; DSQ	SIL	SPA	BRH	SNE; 1 DSQ	SNE; 2; 8	DON	20th	6
2018	Track-Club	McLaren 570S GT4	GT4 Pro-Am	OUL; 1	OUL; 2	ROC	SNE; 1	SNE; 2	SIL; Ret	SPA	BRH	DON	NC	0
2020	Balfe Motorsport	McLaren 570S GT4	GT4 Pro-Am	**OUL**; **1**; 20	**OUL**; **2**; 10	**DON1**; **1**; 19	**DON1**; **2**; 13	**BRH**; 20	**DON2**; 18	**SNE**; **1**; 17	**SNE**; **2**; 15	SIL; Ret	1st	118.75
2021	Jenson Team Rocket RJN	McLaren 720S GT3	GT3 Pro-Am	BRH	SIL; 12	DON1	SPA; Ret	SNE; 1	SNE; 2	OUL; 1	OUL; 2	DON2; 7	NC†	0†
2022	7TSIX	McLaren 720S GT3	GT3 Pro-Am	OUL; 1; 6	OUL; 2; 10	SIL; 29	DON1; 4	SNE; 1; 11	SNE; 2; 12	SPA; Ret	BRH; 5	DON2; 6	10th	98
2023	Race Lab	McLaren 720S GT3 Evo	GT3 Pro-Am	OUL; 1; 8	OUL; 2; 11	SIL; Ret	DON1; 2	SNE; 1; 14	SNE; 2; 12	ALG; 13	BRH	DON2	14th	34
2024	Race Lab	McLaren 720S GT3 Evo	GT3 Pro-Am	OUL; 1	OUL; 2	SIL; NC	DON1; Ret	SPA	SNE; 1	SNE; 2	DON2	BRH	NC	0

^{†} As Hankey was a guest driver, he was ineligible to score points.

=== Complete International GT Open results ===
Year	Team	Car	Class	1	2	3	4	5	6	7	8	9	10	11	12	13	14	Pos.	Points
2015	TF Sport	Aston Martin V12 Vantage GT3	Am	LEC; 1	LEC; 2	EST; 1	EST; 2	SIL; 1	SIL; 2	RBR; 1	RBR; 2	SPA; 1; 1	SPA; 2; 1	MNZ; 1; 2	MNZ; 2; 1			6th	19
2015	TF Sport	Aston Martin V12 Vantage GT3	Pro-Am													CAT; 1; 7	CAT; 2 Ret	NC	0
2016	TF Sport	Aston Martin V12 Vantage GT3	Pro-Am	EST; 1 DNS	EST; 2 DNS	SPA; 1; 6	SPA; 2; 6	LEC; 1; 4	LEC; 2; 3	SIL; 1; 4	SIL; 2; 1	RBR; 1; 6	RBR; 2; 6	MNZ; 1; 1	MNZ; 2 Ret	CAT; 1; 8	CAT; 2 Ret	7th	37

=== Complete European Le Mans Series results ===
(key) (Races in bold indicate pole position; results in italics indicate fastest lap)

Year	Entrant	Class	Chassis	Engine	1	2	3	4	5	6	Rank	Points
2015	TF Sport	GTC	Aston Martin V12 Vantage GT3	Aston Martin AM28 5.9 L V12	SIL	IMO	RBR	LEC	EST; 5		11th	10
2017	TF Sport	GTE	Aston Martin Vantage GTE	Aston Martin 4.5 L V8	**SIL**; 1	MNZ; 2	RBR; 3	LEC; 2	SPA; 5	ALG; 3	2nd	102

=== Complete GT World Challenge results ===
==== GT World Challenge Europe Endurance Cup ====
(Races in bold indicate pole position) (Races in italics indicate fastest lap)

Year	Team	Car	Class	1	2	3	4	5	6	7	Pos.	Points
2015	TF Sport	Aston Martin V12 Vantage GT3	Pro-Am	MNZ	SIL	LEC	SPA; 6H	SPA; 12H	SPA; 24H	NÜR; 39	NC	0
2016	Black Falcon	Mercedes-AMG GT3	Pro-Am	MNZ	SIL	LEC	SPA; 6H	SPA; 12H	SPA; 24H	NÜR; 33	NC	0
2017	Oman Racing Team with TF Sport	Aston Martin V12 Vantage GT3	Pro-Am	MON	SIL	LEC	**SPA**; **6H**; 9	**SPA**; **12H**; 14	**SPA**; **24H**; 15	CAT	11th	40
2018	Ram Racing	Mercedes-AMG GT3	Pro-Am	MNZ; DNS	SIL; 20	**LEC**; 37	**SPA**; **6H**; 54	**SPA**; **12H**; 50	**SPA**; **24H**; 33	CAT	11th	40

=== Complete Le Mans Cup results ===
(key) (Races in bold indicate pole position; results in italics indicate fastest lap)

Year	Entrant	Class	Chassis	1	2	3	4	5	6	Rank	Points
2016	TF Sport	GT3	Aston Martin Vantage GT3	IMO; 1	LMS; 4	RBR; 3	LEC; 3	SPA; 3	EST; 1	2nd	107

=== 24 Hours of Le Mans results ===
Year	Team	Co-Drivers	Car	Class	Laps	Pos.	Class Pos.
2017	(United Kingdom) TF Sport	(Turkey) Salih Yoluç (United Kingdom) Rob Bell	Aston Martin Vantage GTE	GTE; Am	329	35th	7th
2018	(United Kingdom) TF Sport	(Turkey) Salih Yoluç (Republic of Ireland) Charlie Eastwood	Aston Martin Vantage GTE	GTE; Am	304	DNF	DNF
2019	(United Kingdom) TF Sport	(Turkey) Salih Yoluç (Republic of Ireland) Charlie Eastwood	Aston Martin Vantage GTE	GTE; Am	327	42nd	11th

=== Complete FIA World Endurance Championship results ===
(key) (Races in bold indicate pole position; races in italics indicate fastest lap)

Year	Entrant	Class	Chassis	Engine	1	2	3	4	5	6	7	8	Rank	Points
2018–19	TF Sport	LMGTE Am	Aston Martin Vantage GTE	Aston Martin 4.5 L V8	SPA; 2	LMS; Ret	SIL	FUJ	SHA	SEB	**SPA**; 2	LMS; 6	13th	49
