= 2016 International GT Open =

Sports car racing season

The 2016 International GT Open season was the eleventh season of the International GT Open, the grand tourer-style sports car racing founded in 2006 by the Spanish GT Sport Organización. It began on 23 April at Autódromo do Estoril and ended on 6 November, at Barcelona after seven double-header meetings.

== Entry list ==
2016 Entry List
Team	Car	No.	Drivers	Class	Rounds
(Spain) BMW Team Teo Martín	BMW M6 GT3	1	(Portugal) Miguel Ramos	PA	All
(Spain) BMW Team Teo Martín	BMW M6 GT3	1	(Spain) Roldán Rodríguez	PA	1–3
(Spain) BMW Team Teo Martín	BMW M6 GT3	1	(Netherlands) Pieter Schothorst	PA	4–7
(Spain) BMW Team Teo Martín	BMW M6 GT3	2	(Spain) Fernando Monje	PA	All
(Spain) BMW Team Teo Martín	BMW M6 GT3	2	(Colombia) Gustavo Yacamán	PA	All
(Spain) Drivex School	Audi R8 LMS ultra	5	(Portugal) César Campaniço	PA	1
(Spain) Drivex School	Audi R8 LMS ultra	5	(Guatemala) Andrés Saravia	PA	1
(Spain) Drivex School	Audi R8 LMS ultra	5	(Argentina) Juan Cruz Álvarez	PA	2–3, 7
(Spain) Drivex School	Audi R8 LMS ultra	5	(Norway) Anna Rathe	PA	2
(Spain) Drivex School	Audi R8 LMS ultra	5	(Spain) Miguel Ángel de Castro	PA	3
(Spain) Drivex School	Audi R8 LMS ultra	5	(Argentina) Esteban Gini	PA G	7
(China) FFF Racing Team	Lamborghini Huracán GT3	7	(Italy) Andrea Caldarelli	PA	3
(China) FFF Racing Team	Lamborghini Huracán GT3	7	(Italy) Vitantonio Liuzzi	PA	3
(China) SF Racing	Ferrari 488 GT3	7	(Italy) Andrea Caldarelli	PA	5–7
(China) SF Racing	Ferrari 488 GT3	7	(China) Fu Songyang	PA	5–7
(United Kingdom) Radical Works	Radical RXC Turbo GT3	10	(United Kingdom) Colin Noble	PA	1–4
(United Kingdom) Radical Works	Radical RXC Turbo GT3	10	(United Kingdom) James Abbott	PA	1–3
(United Kingdom) Radical Works	Radical RXC Turbo GT3	10	(United Kingdom) Steven Burgess	PA	4
(Portugal) António Nogueira	Porsche 911 GT3 R (997)	11	(Portugal) António Nogueira	Am	1
(United Kingdom) TF Sport	Aston Martin Vantage GT3	11	(United Kingdom) Jon Barnes	PA G	7
(United Kingdom) TF Sport	Aston Martin Vantage GT3	11	(United Kingdom) Mark Farmer	PA G	7
(United Kingdom) TF Sport	Aston Martin Vantage GT3	34	(United Kingdom) Euan Hankey	PA	All
(United Kingdom) TF Sport	Aston Martin Vantage GT3	34	(Turkey) Salih Yoluç	PA	All
(Italy) AF Corse	Ferrari 458 Italia GT3	13	(United Kingdom) John Dhillon	Am	3
(Italy) AF Corse	Ferrari 458 Italia GT3	13	(Belgium) Stéphane Lémeret	Am	3
(Italy) AF Corse	Ferrari 488 GT3 (Note: Car #49 was Ferrari 458 Italia GT3 at Spa.)	49	(Italy) Marco Cioci	PA	2, 6–7
(Italy) AF Corse	Ferrari 488 GT3	49	(Russia) Aleksandr Moiseev	PA	2, 6–7
(Italy) AF Corse	Ferrari 488 GT3	51	(Italy) Marco Cioci	PA	3
(Italy) AF Corse	Ferrari 488 GT3	51	(Italy) Piergiuseppe Perazzini	PA	3
(Italy) AF Corse	Ferrari 488 GT3	54	(Switzerland) Thomas Flohr	PA	1
(Italy) AF Corse	Ferrari 488 GT3	54	(Italy) Francesco Castellacci	PA	1
(Italy) AF Corse	Ferrari 458 Italia GT3	55	(Germany) Claudio Sdanewitsch	Am	1–2
(Italy) AF Corse	Ferrari 458 Italia GT3	55	(Belgium) Stéphane Lémeret	Am	1–2
(Netherlands) V8 Racing	Renault Sport R.S. 01	14	(Netherlands) Nicky Pastorelli	PA	2
(Netherlands) V8 Racing	Renault Sport R.S. 01	14	(United Kingdom) Josh Webster	PA	2
(Netherlands) V8 Racing	Renault Sport R.S. 01	15	(Portugal) Filipe Barreiros	Am	All
(Netherlands) V8 Racing	Renault Sport R.S. 01	15	(Netherlands) Diederik Sitjhoff	Am	1
(Netherlands) V8 Racing	Renault Sport R.S. 01	15	(Netherlands) Max Braams	Am	2–3
(Netherlands) V8 Racing	Renault Sport R.S. 01	15	(United Kingdom) Martin Short	Am	4
(Netherlands) V8 Racing	Renault Sport R.S. 01	15	(Portugal) Francisco Guedes	Am	5–7
(Italy) Petri Corse	Lamborghini Huracán Super Trofeo	17	(Italy) Davide Roda	Am	3
(United Kingdom) Nigel Mustill	Lamborghini Gallardo R-EX GT3	18	(United Kingdom) Craig Dolby	PA	4
(United Kingdom) Nigel Mustill	Lamborghini Gallardo R-EX GT3	18	(Czech Republic) Tomáš Enge	PA	4
(Austria) Lechner Racing Team	Mercedes-AMG GT3	19	(Austria) Thomas Jäger	PA	5–7
(Austria) Lechner Racing Team	Mercedes-AMG GT3	19	(Austria) Mario Plachutta	PA	5–7
(Italy) Solaris Motorsport	Aston Martin Vantage GT3	21	(United Kingdom) Jody Fannin	PA G	7
(Italy) Solaris Motorsport	Aston Martin Vantage GT3	21	(Italy) Francesco Sini	PA G	7
(United Kingdom) Balfe Motorsport	McLaren 650S GT3 (Note: Used Ferrari 458 Italia GT3 at the rounds 1-3)	22	(United Kingdom) Shaun Balfe	PA	All
(United Kingdom) Balfe Motorsport	McLaren 650S GT3	22	(United Kingdom) Phil Keen	PA	1–4, 6–7
(United Kingdom) Balfe Motorsport	McLaren 650S GT3	22	(United Kingdom) Adam Carroll	PA	5
(Italy) Imperiale Racing	Lamborghini Huracán GT3	23	(Italy) Simone Pellegrinelli	PA	6
(Italy) Imperiale Racing	Lamborghini Huracán GT3	23	(Italy) Vito Postiglione	PA	6
(United States) Scuderia Cameron Glickenhaus	SCG 003C	24	(Italy) Lorenzo Bontempelli	Am	6
(United States) Scuderia Cameron Glickenhaus	SCG 003C	24	(Italy) Beniamino Caccia	Am	6
(Italy) Antonelli Motorsport	Lamborghini Huracán GT3	25	(Italy) Marco Antonelli	PA G	7
(Italy) Antonelli Motorsport	Lamborghini Huracán GT3	25	(Italy) Daniel Zampieri	PA G	7
(Italy) Antonelli Motorsport	Lamborghini Huracán Super Trofeo	32	(Romania) Kikko Galbiati	Am	6–7
(Italy) Antonelli Motorsport	Lamborghini Huracán Super Trofeo	32	(Italy) Omar Galbiati	Am	6
(Italy) Antonelli Motorsport	Lamborghini Huracán Super Trofeo	32	(Italy) Manuel Deodati	Am G	7
(Italy) Orange 1 Team Lazarus	Lamborghini Huracán GT3	27	(Italy) Thomas Biagi	PA	All
(Italy) Orange 1 Team Lazarus	Lamborghini Huracán GT3	27	(Italy) Fabrizio Crestani	PA	All
(Germany) Attempto Racing	Porsche 911 GT3 R	28	(France) Kévin Estre	PA	7
(Germany) Attempto Racing	Porsche 911 GT3 R	28	(Germany) Peter Terting	PA G	7
(Germany) Attempto Racing	Porsche 911 GT3 R	29	(Germany) Arkin Aka	Am G	7
(Germany) Attempto Racing	Porsche 911 GT3 R	29	(Germany) Jürgen Häring	Am G	7
(Germany) Attempto Racing	Porsche 911 GT3 R	30	(Norway) Christian Krognes	PA G	7
(Germany) Attempto Racing	Porsche 911 GT3 R	30	(Finland) Emil Lindholm	PA G	7
(United Kingdom) FF Corse (Note: Originally an Am entry, the entry was reclassified as Pro-Am after Stanley clinched pole position for the second race at Silverstone.)	Ferrari 488 GT3	48	(United Kingdom) Paul McNeilly	Am; PA	4
(United Kingdom) FF Corse	Ferrari 488 GT3	48	(United Kingdom) Jamie Stanley	Am; PA	4
(United Kingdom) Garage 59	McLaren 650S GT3	59	(United Kingdom) Michael Benham	PA	1–5, 7
(United Kingdom) Garage 59	McLaren 650S GT3	59	(United Kingdom) Duncan Tappy	PA	1–5, 7
(United Kingdom) Garage 59	McLaren 650S GT3	88	(Sweden) Alexander West	PA	All
(United Kingdom) Garage 59	McLaren 650S GT3	88	(France) Kévin Estre	PA	1
(United Kingdom) Garage 59	McLaren 650S GT3	88	(France) Côme Ledogar	PA	2–4, 6–7
(United Kingdom) Garage 59	McLaren 650S GT3	88	(Portugal) Álvaro Parente	PA	5
(Italy) Ebimotors	Lamborghini Huracán GT3	64	(Italy) Fabio Babini	PA	2–3, 5–6
(Italy) Ebimotors	Lamborghini Huracán GT3	64	(Italy) Emanuele Busnelli	PA	2–3, 5–6
(Switzerland) Kessel Racing	Ferrari 458 Italia GT3	65	(Italy) Nicola Cadei	PA G	7
(Switzerland) Kessel Racing	Ferrari 458 Italia GT3	65	(Luxembourg) Alexis de Bernardi	PA G	7
(Switzerland) Kessel Racing	Ferrari 458 Italia GT3	111	(United States) Stephen Earle	Am G	7
(Switzerland) Kessel Racing	Ferrari 458 Italia GT3	111	(South Africa) David Perel	Am G	7
(France) AKKA ASP Team	Mercedes-AMG GT3	87	(France) Benjamin Ricci	Am G	7
(France) AKKA ASP Team	Mercedes-AMG GT3	87	(France) Mauro Ricci	Am G	7
(France) AKKA ASP Team	Mercedes-AMG GT3	89	(France) Jean Luc Beaubelique	PA G	7
(France) AKKA ASP Team	Mercedes-AMG GT3	89	(France) Jérôme Policand	PA G	7
(United Kingdom) RAW Motorsport	Radical RXC Turbo GT3	96	(United Kingdom) Thomas Ashton	PA	4
(United Kingdom) RAW Motorsport	Radical RXC Turbo GT3	96	(United Kingdom) Robert Wheldon	PA	4
(Portugal) Sports and You	Mercedes-AMG GT3	99	(Portugal) António Coimbra (Portugal) "Manuel da Costa"	Am	1–3, 7; 4–6
(Portugal) Sports and You	Mercedes-AMG GT3	99	(Portugal) Luís Silva (Portugal) "Miguel Sardinha"	Am	1–3, 7; 4–6

Icon	Class
PA	Pro-Amateur
Am	Amateur
G	Guest

== Race calendar ==
A seven-round provisional calendar was revealed on 12 November 2015. On 8 March 2016, the final round was pushed back a week.

Round		Circuit	Date	Pole position	Pro-Am Winner	Am Winner
1	R1	(Portugal) Autódromo do Estoril	23 April	(Italy) No. 27 Orange 1 Team Lazarus	(United Kingdom) No. 22 Balfe Motorsport	(Portugal) No. 99 Sports and You
1	R1	(Portugal) Autódromo do Estoril	23 April	(Italy) Thomas Biagi (Italy) Fabrizio Crestani	(United Kingdom) Shaun Balfe (United Kingdom) Phil Keen	(Portugal) António Coimbra (Portugal) Luís Silva
1	R2	(Portugal) Autódromo do Estoril	24 April	(United Kingdom) No. 88 Garage 59	(United Kingdom) No. 59 Garage 59	(Portugal) No. 99 Sports and You
1	R2	(Portugal) Autódromo do Estoril	24 April	(France) Kévin Estre (Sweden) Alexander West	(United Kingdom) Michael Benham (United Kingdom) Duncan Tappy	(Portugal) António Coimbra (Portugal) Luís Silva
2	R1	(Belgium) Circuit de Spa-Francorchamps	21 May	(Spain) No. 2 BMW Team Teo Martín	(Spain) No. 1 BMW Team Teo Martín	(Italy) No. 55 AF Corse
2	R1	(Belgium) Circuit de Spa-Francorchamps	21 May	(Spain) Fernando Monje (Colombia) Gustavo Yacamán	(Portugal) Miguel Ramos (Spain) Roldán Rodríguez	(Germany) Claudio Sdanewitsch (Belgium) Stéphane Lémeret
2	R2	(Belgium) Circuit de Spa-Francorchamps	22 May	(United Kingdom) No. 88 Garage 59	(Netherlands) No. 14 V8 Racing	(Netherlands) No. 15 V8 Racing
2	R2	(Belgium) Circuit de Spa-Francorchamps	22 May	(France) Côme Ledogar (Sweden) Alexander West	(Netherlands) Nicky Pastorelli (United Kingdom) Josh Webster	(Portugal) Filipe Barreiros (Netherlands) Max Braams
3	R1	(France) Circuit Paul Ricard, Le Castellet	4 June	(United Kingdom) No. 88 Garage 59	(Spain) No. 1 BMW Team Teo Martín	(Netherlands) No. 15 V8 Racing
3	R1	(France) Circuit Paul Ricard, Le Castellet	4 June	(France) Côme Ledogar (Sweden) Alexander West	(Portugal) Miguel Ramos (Spain) Roldán Rodríguez	(Portugal) Filipe Barreiros (Netherlands) Max Braams
3	R2	(France) Circuit Paul Ricard, Le Castellet	5 June	(United Kingdom) No. 59 Garage 59	(Italy) No. 27 Orange 1 Team Lazarus	(Netherlands) No. 15 V8 Racing
3	R2	(France) Circuit Paul Ricard, Le Castellet	5 June	(United Kingdom) Michael Benham (United Kingdom) Duncan Tappy	(Italy) Thomas Biagi (Italy) Fabrizio Crestani	(Portugal) Filipe Barreiros (Netherlands) Max Braams
4	R1	(United Kingdom) Silverstone Circuit	23 July	(United Kingdom) No. 88 Garage 59	(United Kingdom) No. 18 Nigel Mustil	(United Kingdom) No. 48 FF Corse
4	R1	(United Kingdom) Silverstone Circuit	23 July	(France) Côme Ledogar (Sweden) Alexander West	(United Kingdom) Craig Dolby (Germany) Tomáš Enge	(United Kingdom) Paul McNeilly (United Kingdom) Jamie Stanley
4	R2	(United Kingdom) Silverstone Circuit	24 July	(United Kingdom) No. 48 FF Corse	(United Kingdom) No. 34 TF Sport	(Portugal) No. 99 Sports and You
4	R2	(United Kingdom) Silverstone Circuit	24 July	(United Kingdom) Paul McNeilly (United Kingdom) Jamie Stanley	(United Kingdom) Euan Hankey (Turkey) Salih Yoluç	(Portugal) "Manuel da Costa" (Portugal) "Miguel Sardinha"
5	R1	(Austria) Red Bull Ring, Spielberg	10 September	(China) No. 7 SF Racing	(Spain) No. 1 BMW Team Teo Martín	(Portugal) No. 99 Sports and You
5	R1	(Austria) Red Bull Ring, Spielberg	10 September	(Italy) Andrea Caldarelli (China) Fu Songyang	(Portugal) Miguel Ramos (Netherlands) Pieter Schothorst	(Portugal) "Manuel da Costa" (Portugal) "Miguel Sardinha"
5	R2	(Austria) Red Bull Ring, Spielberg	11 September	(Spain) No. 1 BMW Team Teo Martín	(Spain) No. 2 BMW Team Teo Martín	(Portugal) No. 99 Sports and You
5	R2	(Austria) Red Bull Ring, Spielberg	11 September	(Portugal) Miguel Ramos (Netherlands) Pieter Schothorst	(Spain) Fernando Monje (Colombia) Gustavo Yacamán	(Portugal) "Manuel da Costa" (Portugal) "Miguel Sardinha"
6	R1	(Italy) Autodromo Nazionale Monza	1 October	(United Kingdom) No. 34 TF Sport	(United Kingdom) No. 34 TF Sport	(Portugal) No. 99 Sports and You
6	R1	(Italy) Autodromo Nazionale Monza	1 October	(United Kingdom) Euan Hankey (Turkey) Salih Yoluç	(United Kingdom) Euan Hankey (Turkey) Salih Yoluç	(Portugal) "Manuel da Costa" (Portugal) "Miguel Sardinha"
6	R2	(Italy) Autodromo Nazionale Monza	2 October	(Italy) No. 27 Orange 1 Team Lazarus	(United Kingdom) No. 88 Garage 59	(Portugal) No. 99 Sports and You
6	R2	(Italy) Autodromo Nazionale Monza	2 October	(Italy) Thomas Biagi (Italy) Fabrizio Crestani	(France) Côme Ledogar (Sweden) Alexander West	(Portugal) "Manuel da Costa" (Portugal) "Miguel Sardinha"
7	R1	(Spain) Circuit de Barcelona-Catalunya	5 November	(Italy) No. 27 Orange 1 Team Lazarus	(Germany) No. 28 Attempto Racing	(Switzerland) No. 111 Kessel Racing
7	R1	(Spain) Circuit de Barcelona-Catalunya	5 November	(Italy) Thomas Biagi (Italy) Fabrizio Crestani	(France) Kévin Estre (Germany) Peter Terting	(United States) Stephen Earle (South Africa) David Perel
7	R2	(Spain) Circuit de Barcelona-Catalunya	6 November	(Italy) No. 25 Antonelli Motorsport	(Italy) No. 25 Antonelli Motorsport	(Germany) No. 29 Attempto Racing
7	R2	(Spain) Circuit de Barcelona-Catalunya	6 November	(Italy) Marco Antonelli (Italy) Daniel Zampieri	(Italy) Marco Antonelli (Italy) Daniel Zampieri	(Germany) Arkin Aka (Germany) Jürgen Häring

== Championship standings ==
Scoring system

The scored points P in the race are calculated with the following formula: P = S + C. Being “S” the points scored in the Scratch classification and “C” the points scored in the class. Points per category (C) are allotted in its entirely if, at least, 6 participants start the race. If the number of participants starting the race is less than 6, 50% of the points will be allotted.

Scratch Race points

Position	1st	2nd	3rd	4th	5th	6th	7th	8th	9th
Points	12	10	8	6	5	4	3	2	1

Class Race points

Position	1st	2nd	3rd	4th	5th
Points	10	8	6	4	3

=== Teams' Championship ===
Pos.	Class	Team	Car	EST (Portugal)		SPA (Belgium)		LEC (France)		SIL (United Kingdom)		RBR (Austria)		MNZ (Italy)		CAT (Spain)		Total
1	PA	(Italy) Orange 1 Team Lazarus #27	Lamborghini Huracán GT3	3	3	8	5	5	1	2	4	7	2	2	3	2	2	185
2	PA	(United Kingdom) Balfe Motorsport #22	Ferrari 458 Italia GT3	1	4	4	4	7	7									133
2	PA	(United Kingdom) Balfe Motorsport #22	McLaren 650S GT3							5	5	3	4	4	9	3	4	133
3	PA	(Spain) Teo Martín Motorsport #2	BMW M6 GT3	2	6	Ret	DNS	Ret	2	6	2	4	1	5	2	7	8	125
4	PA	(Spain) Teo Martín Motorsport #1	BMW M6 GT3	7	Ret	1	8	1	8	3	6	1	7	6	Ret	6	1	124
5	PA	(United Kingdom) TF Sport #34	Aston Martin Vantage GT3			6	6	4	3	4	1	6	6	1	Ret	5	Ret	102
6	PA	(United Kingdom) Garage 59 #88	McLaren 650S GT3	4	10	3	9	9	5	10	8	5	3	3	1	9	Ret	95
7	PA	(United Kingdom) Garage 59 #59	McLaren 650S GT3	6	1	10	2	10	14	8	3	Ret	5			4	14	79
8	A	(Portugal) Sports And You #99	Mercedes-AMG GT GT3	8	7	11	13	13	Ret	9	9	8	10	11	8	Ret	5	71
9	PA	(Netherlands) V8 Racing #14	Renault Sport R.S. 01			2	1											40
10	A	(Netherlands) V8 Racing #15	Renault Sport R.S. 01	9	12	Ret	10	12	11	11	11	9	11	Ret	Ret			38
11	PA	(Germany) Attempto Racing #11	Porsche 911 GT3 R													1	7	28
11	PA	(Italy) AF Corse #51	Ferrari 488 GT3					2	4									28
12	PA	(Italy) AF Corse #49	Ferrari 458 Italia GT3			5	3							7	5			26
13	PA	(Austria) Lechner Racing Team #19	Mercedes-AMG GT GT3									2	12	9	6			23
13	A	(Italy) Antonelli Motorsport #32	Lamborghini Huracán Super Trofeo													8	6	23
14	PA	(United Kingdom) Nigel Mustill #18	Lamborghini Gallardo Rex GT3							1	13							22
15	A	(Italy) AF Corse #55	Ferrari 458 Italia GT3	10	8	7	12											21
16	PA	(Spain) Drivex School #5	Audi R8 LMS ultra	13	2	13	14	8	13									20
17	PA	(China) FFF Racing Team by ACM #7	Lamborghini Huracán GT3					3	6									18
18	PA	(Italy) Ebimotors #64	Lamborghini Huracán GT3			9	11	6	9			10	9	10	7			17
19	PA	(Italy) AF Corse #54	Ferrari 488 GT3	5	5													16
20	PA	(Italy) Imperiale Racing #23	Lamborghini Huracán											8	4			12
21	A	(United Kingdom) FF Corse #48	Ferrari 488 GT3							7								11
21	PA	(United Kingdom) FF Corse #48	Ferrari 488 GT3								7							11
22	A	(Italy) Antonelli Motorsport #32	Lamborghini Huracán Super Trofeo											12	10			8
23	A	(Italy) AF Corse #13	Ferrari 458 Italia GT3					14	12									7
24	A	(Portugal) Antonio Nogueira #11	Porsche 997 GT3 R	11	11													5
25	A	(Italy) Petri Corse #17	Lamborghini Huracán Super Trofeo					15	15									5
26	PA	(United Kingdom) Radical Works Team #10	Radical RXC V8	12	9	12	7	11	10	Ret	12							4
27	A	(United States) Scuderia Cameron Glickenhaus #24	SCG 003C											13	Ret			3
28	PA	(China) SF Racing #7	Ferrari 488 GT3									11	8	Ret	Ret			2
29	PA	(United Kingdom) RAW Motorsport #96	Radical RXC V8							Ret	10							0
