= TF Sport =

Auto racing team

(United Kingdom) TF Sport
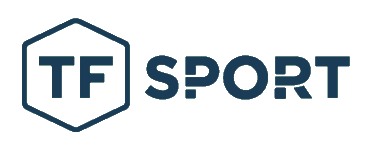
- Founded: 2014
- Base: Slinfold, West Sussex
- Team principal(s): Tom Ferrier
- Current series: FIA World Endurance Championship; European Le Mans Series; Asian Le Mans Series
- Current drivers: (United States) Ben Keating (New Zealand) Scott McLaughlin (United States) Connor Zilisch (New Zealand) Shane Van Gisbergen (United States) PJ Hyett (Japan) Hiroshi Koizumi (United Kingdom) Jonny Edgar (Spain) Daniel Juncadella (Belgium) Tom Van Rompuy (Angola) Rui Andrade (Republic of Ireland) Charlie Eastwood (United States) Blake McDonald (Turkey) Salih Yoluc

TF Sport is an auto racing team founded by Tom Ferrier and headquartered in Slinfold, West Sussex, England, United Kingdom. The team currently competes in the various Sports car racing championships across the world including the FIA World Endurance Championship, the European Le Mans Series, the IMSA SportsCar Championship and the Asian Le Mans Series competing with the Corvette Z06.R GT3.

== Overview ==
Founded in 2014 by former British Touring Car and British GT driver Tom Ferrier, TF Sport dovetailed a third British GT campaign with a strong European competition programme in the newly established GT3 Le Mans Cup and International GT Open.

Having successfully competed in 2015 in the Blancpain Series, the GT cup and the International GT Open, TF Sport launched an additional campaign for the Michelin GT3 Le Mans Cup title in the 2016 season.

Championship titles at home and abroad turned 2016 into a breakthrough year for TF Sport, but 2017 was even more momentous, as the official Aston Martin Racing Partner Team stepped over to GTE-spec machinery for a dream assault on the European Le Mans Series and the 24 Hours of Le Mans.

TF Sport also provides racing team operations for a number of entries in different competitions, such as the 2023 Racing Team Turkey LMP2 entry to Le Mans and support for the Team TGM entry to the 2023 24 Hours of Daytona.

On 28 June 2023, it was announced that TF Sport would be aiming to run 2 Corvette Z06 GT3.Rs in the WEC in 2024, competing in the new LMGT3 class.

== Racing record ==
=== 24 Hours of Le Mans results ===
Year	Entrant	No.	Car	Drivers	Class	Laps	Pos.	Class Pos.
2017	(United Kingdom) TF Sport	90	Aston Martin Vantage GTE	(United Kingdom) Rob Bell (United Kingdom) Euan Hankey (Turkey) Salih Yoluç	LMGTE Am	329	35th	7th
2018	(United Kingdom) TF Sport	90	Aston Martin Vantage GTE	(Republic of Ireland) Charlie Eastwood (United Kingdom) Euan Hankey (Turkey) Salih Yoluç	LMGTE Am	304	DNF	DNF
2019	(United Kingdom) TF Sport	90	Aston Martin Vantage GTE	(Republic of Ireland) Charlie Eastwood (United Kingdom) Euan Hankey (Turkey) Salih Yoluç	LMGTE Am	327	42nd	11th
2020	(United Kingdom) TF Sport	90	Aston Martin Vantage AMR	(United Kingdom) Jonny Adam (Republic of Ireland) Charlie Eastwood (Turkey) Salih Yoluç	LMGTE Am	339	24th	1st
2021	(United Kingdom) TF Sport	33	Aston Martin Vantage AMR	(Brazil) Felipe Fraga (United States) Ben Keating (Luxembourg) Dylan Pereira	LMGTE Am	339	26th	2nd
2021	(United Kingdom) TF Sport	95	Aston Martin Vantage AMR	(United Kingdom) Ross Gunn (United Kingdom) Ollie Hancock (United Kingdom) John Hartshorne	LMGTE Am	332	35th	8th
2021	(Japan) D'station Racing	777	Aston Martin Vantage AMR	(Japan) Tomonobu Fujii (Japan) Satoshi Hoshino (United Kingdom) Andrew Watson	LMGTE Am	333	33rd	6th
2022	(United Kingdom) TF Sport	33	Aston Martin Vantage AMR	(Portugal) Henrique Chaves (United States) Ben Keating (Denmark) Marco Sørensen	LMGTE Am	343	34th	1st
2022	(Japan) D'station Racing	777	Aston Martin Vantage AMR	(United Kingdom) Charlie Fagg (Japan) Tomonobu Fujii (Japan) Satoshi Hoshino	LMGTE Am	112	DNF	DNF
2023	Racing Team Turkey	923	Oreca 07-Gibson	(United Kingdom) Tom Gamble (Belgium) Dries Vanthoor (Turkey) Salih Yoluç	LMP2 (Pro-Am)	87	DNF	DNF
2023	(Oman) ORT by TF	25	Aston Martin Vantage AMR	(Oman) Ahmad Al Harthy (United States) Michael Dinan (Republic of Ireland) Charlie Eastwood	LMGTE Am	312	28th	2nd
2023	(United Kingdom) TF Sport	72	Aston Martin Vantage AMR	(France) Valentin Hasse-Clot (France) Arnold Robin (France) Maxime Robin	LMGTE Am	58	DNF	DNF
2023	(Japan) D'station Racing	777	Aston Martin Vantage AMR	(Japan) Tomonobu Fujii (Japan) Satoshi Hoshino (United Kingdom) Casper Stevenson	LMGTE Am	163	DNF	DNF
2024	(United States) AO by TF	14	Oreca 07-Gibson	(Switzerland) Louis Delétraz (United States) P. J. Hyett (United Kingdom) Alex Quinn	LMP2 (Pro-Am)	295	20th	2nd
2024	(United Kingdom) TF Sport	81	Chevrolet Corvette Z06 GT3.R	(Angola) Rui Andrade (Republic of Ireland) Charlie Eastwood (Belgium) Tom Van Rompuy	LMGT3	267	43rd	15th
2024	(United Kingdom) TF Sport	82	Chevrolet Corvette Z06 GT3.R	(France) Sébastien Baud (Spain) Daniel Juncadella (Japan) Hiroshi Koizumi	LMGT3	278	38th	11th
2025	(United States) AO by TF	199	Oreca 07-Gibson	(United States) Dane Cameron (Switzerland) Louis Delétraz (United States) P. J. Hyett	LMP2 (Pro-Am)	366	20th	1st
2025	(Canada) AWA Racing	13	Chevrolet Corvette Z06 GT3.R	(United Kingdom) Matt Bell (Canada) Orey Fidani (Germany) Lars Kern	LMGT3	338	42nd	10th
2025	(United Kingdom) TF Sport	33	Chevrolet Corvette Z06 GT3.R	(United Kingdom) Jonny Edgar (Spain) Daniel Juncadella (United States) Ben Keating	LMGT3	339	39th	7th
2025	(United Kingdom) TF Sport	81	Chevrolet Corvette Z06 GT3.R	(Angola) Rui Andrade (Republic of Ireland) Charlie Eastwood (Belgium) Tom Van Rompuy	LMGT3	341	35th	3rd
2026	(United States) AO by TF	99	Oreca 07-Gibson	(Australia) James Allen (United States) Dane Cameron (United States) P. J. Hyett	LMP2 (Pro-Am)	356	24th	3rd
2026	(United Kingdom) TF Sport	2	Chevrolet Corvette Z06 GT3.R	(United Kingdom) Ben Green (United Kingdom) Lorcan Hanafin (Malaysia) Prince Jefri Ibrahim	LMGT3	330	46th	14th
2026	(United Kingdom) TF Sport	33	Chevrolet Corvette Z06 GT3.R	(Netherlands) Nicky Catsburg (United Kingdom) Jonny Edgar (United States) Ben Keating	LMGT3	336	33rd	1st
2026	(Canada) 13 Autosport	13	Chevrolet Corvette Z06 GT3.R	(United Kingdom) Matt Bell (Canada) Orey Fidani (Germany) Lars Kern	LMGT3	61	DNF	DNF
2026	Racing Team Turkey by TF	34	Chevrolet Corvette Z06 GT3.R	(Republic of Ireland) Peter Dempsey (Republic of Ireland) Charlie Eastwood (Turkey) Salih Yoluç	LMGT3	335	38th	6th

=== Complete British GT results ===
British GT results
Year	Car	Class	Drivers	Wins	Podiums	Points	D.C.	T.C.
2014	Aston Martin V8 Vantage GT4	GT4	(United Kingdom) Andrew Jarman (United Kingdom) Devon Modell	2	7	190	2nd	3rd
2015	Aston Martin V12 Vantage GT3	GT3	(United Kingdom) Andrew Jarman (United Kingdom) Jody Fannin	0	2	60	7th	3rd
2015	Aston Martin V12 Vantage GT3	GT3	(United Kingdom) Matt Bell (United Kingdom) Derek Johnston	1	3	107	5th	3rd
2016	Aston Martin V12 Vantage GT3	GT3	(United Kingdom) Jonathan Adam (United Kingdom) Derek Johnston	2	2	106	1st	1st
2016	Aston Martin V12 Vantage GT3	GT3	(United Kingdom) John Barnes (United Kingdom) Mark Farmer	1	1	79.5	5th	1st
2017	Aston Martin V12 Vantage GT3	GT3	(United Kingdom) Jonathan Adam (United Kingdom) Derek Johnston	2	4	142.5	3rd	1st
2017	Aston Martin V12 Vantage GT3	GT3	(United Kingdom) John Barnes (United Kingdom) Mark Farmer	0	4	128.5	5th	1st
2018	Aston Martin V12 Vantage GT3	GT3	(Denmark) Marco Sorensen (United Kingdom) Derek Johnston	1	4	98	6th	1st
2018	Aston Martin V12 Vantage GT3	GT3	(Denmark) Nicki Thiim (United Kingdom) Mark Farmer	2	6	148	3rd	1st
2019	Aston Martin Vantage AMR GT3	GT3	(United Kingdom) Jonathan Adam (United Kingdom) Graham Davidson	2	3	131	1st	2nd
2019	Aston Martin Vantage AMR GT3	GT3	(Denmark) Nicki Thiim (United Kingdom) Mark Farmer	0	1	72.5	8th	2nd
2019	Aston Martin Vantage AMR GT4	GT4	(United Kingdom) Tom Canning (United Kingdom) Ash Hand	1	5	140	1st	1st
2019	Aston Martin Vantage AMR GT4	GT4	(United Kingdom) Patrick Kibble (United Kingdom) Josh Price	0	1	44.5	12th	1st
2020	Aston Martin Vantage AMR GT4	GT4	(Republic of Ireland) Connor O'Brien (United Kingdom) Patrick Kibble	2	6	158.5	3rd	1st
2020	Aston Martin Vantage AMR GT4	GT4	(United Kingdom) Jamie Caroline (United Kingdom) Daniel Vaughan	1	6	170	1st	1st
2020	Aston Martin Vantage AMR GT3	GT3	(United Kingdom) Tom Canning (Italy) Giacomo Petrobelli	0	0	0	N/C	N/C

=== Complete FIA World Endurance Championship results ===
Year	Entrant	Class	No	Chassis	Engine	Drivers	Rounds	1	2	3	4	5	6	7	8	Pos.	Pts
Year	Entrant	Class	No	Chassis	Engine	Drivers	Rounds	(Belgium) SPA	(France) LMS	(United Kingdom) SIL	(Japan) FUJ	(China) SHA	(United States) SEB	(Belgium) SPA	(France) LMS	Pos.	Pts
2018–19	(United Kingdom) TF Sport	LMGTE Am	90	Aston Martin Vantage GTE	Aston Martin 4.5 L V8	(Republic of Ireland) Charlie Eastwood (Turkey) Salih Yoluç (United Kingdom) Euan Hankey (United Kingdom) Jonathan Adam	All; All; 1-2, 7-8; 3-6	22 (2nd)	Ret	18 (2nd)	24 (2nd)	29 (8th)	25 (6th)	26 (2nd)	42 (6th)	3rd	99
								(United Kingdom) SIL	(Japan) FUJ	(China) SHA	(Bahrain) BHR	(United States) COA	(Belgium) SPA	(France) LMS	(Bahrain) BHR	Pos.	Pts
2019–20	(United Kingdom) TF Sport	LMGTE Am	90	Aston Martin Vantage AMR	Mercedes-Benz M177 4.0 L Turbo V8	(United Kingdom) Jonathan Adam (Republic of Ireland) Charlie Eastwood (Turkey) Salih Yoluç	All; All; All	24 (7th)	19 (1st)	19 (1st)	Ret	19 (1st)	17 (3rd)	24 (1st)	21 (8th)	2nd	154
								(Belgium) SPA	(Portugal) POR	(Italy) MNZ	(France) LMS	(Bahrain) BHR	(Bahrain) BHR			Pos.	Pts
2021	(United Kingdom) TF Sport	LMGTE Am	33	Aston Martin Vantage AMR	Aston Martin 4.0 L Turbo V8	(Brazil) Felipe Fraga (United States) Ben Keating (Luxembourg) Dylan Pereira	All; All; All	21 (2nd)	25 (7th)	32 (12th)	26 (2nd)	17 (1st)	Ret			2nd	90.5
2021	(Japan) D'Station Racing	LMGTE Am	777	Aston Martin Vantage AMR	Aston Martin 4.0 L Turbo V8	(Japan) Tomonobu Fujii (Japan) Satoshi Hoshino (United Kingdom) Andrew Watson	All; All; All	26 (7th)	Ret	21 (3rd)	33 (5th)	28 (10th)	26 (7th)			9th	51
								(United States) SEB	(Belgium) SPA	(France) LMS	(Italy) MNZ	(Japan) FUJ	(Bahrain) BHR			Pos.	Pts
2022	(United Kingdom) TF Sport	LMGTE Am	33	Aston Martin Vantage AMR	Aston Martin 4.0 L Turbo V8	(United States) Ben Keating (Denmark) Marco Sørensen (France) Florian Latorre (Portugal) Henrique Chaves	All; All; 1; 2-6	23 (2nd)	22 (2nd)	34 (1st)	Ret	23 (1st)	26 (4th)			1st	141
2022	(Japan) D'Station Racing	LMGTE Am	777	Aston Martin Vantage AMR	Aston Martin 4.0 L Turbo V8	(Japan) Tomonobu Fujii (Japan) Satoshi Hoshino (United Kingdom) Charlie Fagg	All; All; All	27 (6th)	27 (7th)	Ret	32 (11th)	25 (3rd)	32 (10th)			10th	35
								(United States) SEB	(Portugal) POR	(Belgium) SPA	(France) LMS	(Italy) MNZ	(Japan) FUJ	(Bahrain) BHR		Pos.	Pts
2023	(Oman) ORT by TF	LMGTE Am	25	Aston Martin Vantage AMR	Aston Martin 4.0 L Turbo V8	(Oman) Ahmad Al Harthy (United States) Michael Dinan (Republic of Ireland) Charlie Eastwood	1-4; 1-4; 1-4	26 (9th)	28 (8th)	22 (3rd)	28 (2nd)	28 (7th)	35 (13th)	N/C		5th	65
2023	(Japan) D'Station Racing	LMGTE Am	777	Aston Martin Vantage AMR	Aston Martin 4.0 L Turbo V8	(Japan) Tomonobu Fujii (Japan) Satoshi Hoshino (United Kingdom) Casper Stevenson	1-4; 1-4; 1-4	27 (10th)	Ret	29 (10th)	Ret	Ret	32 (10th)	23 (2nd)		14th	31
								(Qatar) LUS	(Italy) IMO	(Belgium) SPA	(France) LMS	(Brazil) INT	(United States) COA	(Japan) FUJ	(Bahrain) BHR	Pos.	Pts
2024	(United Kingdom) TF Sport	LMGT3	81	Chevrolet Corvette Z06 GT3.R	Chevrolet LT6.R 5.5 L V8	(Angola) Rui Andrade (Republic of Ireland) Charlie Eastwood (Belgium) Tom Van Rompuy											
2024	(United Kingdom) TF Sport	LMGT3	82	Chevrolet Corvette Z06 GT3.R	Chevrolet LT6.R 5.5 L V8	(France) Sébastien Baud (Spain) Daniel Juncadella (Japan) Hiroshi Koizumi											

- * Season still in progress.

=== European Le Mans Series results ===
ELMS results
Year	Car	Class	Drivers	Wins	Podiums	Points	D.C.	T.C.
2017	Aston Martin V8 Vantage GTE	LMGTE	(Denmark) Nicki Thiim (Turkey) Salih Yoluc (United Kingdom) Euan Hankey	1	5	102	2nd	2nd

=== Blancpain GT Series Endurance Cup results ===
Blancpain GT Series results
Year	Car	Class	Drivers	Wins	Podiums	Points	D.C.	T.C.
2017	Aston Martin V12 Vantage GT3	Pro-AM	(Oman) Ahmad Al Harthy (United Kingdom) Jonathan Adam	2	6	116	1st	1st
2018	Aston Martin V12 Vantage GT3	Silver	(Republic of Ireland) Charlie Eastwood (Oman) Ahmad Al Harthy (United Kingdom) Euan McKay	0	0	47	7th	7th

=== Complete Michelin Le Mans Cup results ===
Michelin Le Mans Cup results
Year	Car	Class	Drivers	Races	Wins	Podiums	Points	D.C.	T.C.
2016	Aston Martin V12 Vantage GT3	GT3	(Turkey) Salih Yoluc (United Kingdom) Euan Hankey	6	2	5	107	2nd	1st
2017	Aston Martin V12 Vantage GT3	GT3	(Oman) Ahmad Al Harthy (United Kingdom) Tom Jackson	2	2	2	30	7th	6th

=== Complete International GT Open results ===
International GT Open results
Year	Car	Class	Drivers	Wins	Podiums	Points	D.C.
2014	Aston Martin V12 Vantage GT3	Super GT	(United Kingdom) Darren Turner (United Kingdom) Jody Fannin	1	2	40	20th
2015	Aston Martin V12 Vantage GT3	GT Am	(United Kingdom) Euan Hankey (Turkey) Salih Yoluç	3	4	19	5th
2016	Aston Martin V12 Vantage GT3	Pro-Am	(United Kingdom) Euan Hankey (Turkey) Salih Yoluç	2	3	102	5th
2016	Aston Martin V12 Vantage GT3	Pro-Am (Guest)	(United Kingdom) Jon Barnes (United Kingdom) Mark Farmer	0	0	0	N/C
2020	Aston Martin Vantage AMR	Pro	(Republic of Ireland) Charlie Eastwood (Turkey) Salih Yoluc	3	8	112	2nd
2020	Aston Martin Vantage AMR	Pro-Am	(United Kingdom) Tom Canning (Oman) Ahmad Al Harthy	0	1	11	17th
