= Matt George =

British Racing Driver

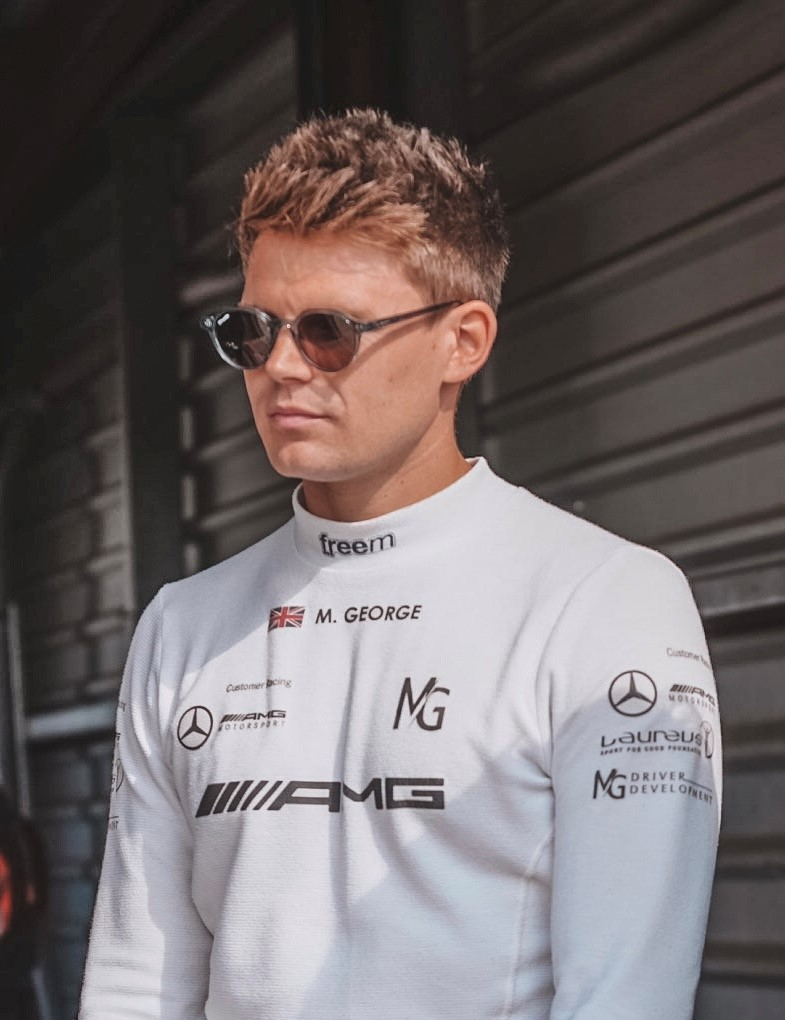
- George in 2023
- Born: 16 July 1995 (age 31) Cheltenham, England

GT4 career
- Debut season: 2016
- Current team: Venture Innovations
- Car number: 21
- Former teams: Generation AMR; SuperRacing

Previous series
- 2024 2023-2022 2022 2019 2019, 2017-2016 2019-2018, 2016 2018-2017 2017: Hankook 24HR Series; British Endurance (BEC); JCW Mini Challenge; GT Masters; Gulf 12 Hours; British GT Championship; FFSA French GT4; European GT4

Matthew George (born 16 July 1995) is a British racing driver. He started his motor racing career karting in 2007, becoming Midland Karting Champion in 2010. before moving up to car racing in 2016.

George worked as a technician and driver coach at Base Performance Simulators, a racing simulator company led by three-time Le Mans winning Aston Martin factory driver, Darren Turner. George coached Superdry co-founder James Holder at Base Performance, working closely with him for six months before Holder made the decision to form racing team SuperRacing and signed George as the teams pro driver. George and Holder competed as a Pro-Am partnership within the British GT4 Championship, GT4 European Series, FFSA GT Championship, and Gulf 12 Hours.

A notable moment within George's racing career has been his involvement in the Invictus Games Racing team, helping a select group of wounded, injured and sick (WIS) British Armed Forces veterans to compete in the 2018 British GT Championship.

== Invictus Games Racing ==
A select group of wounded, injured and sick (WIS) veterans of the British Armed Forces competed in the 2018 British GT Championship as part of a motor racing team in specially designed Jaguar race cars.

Invictus Games Racing was a collaboration between James Holder and the Invictus Games Foundation. The team's mission was to give (WIS) servicemen/woman the chance to experience the adrenaline of competitive racing embracing the ethos of the Invictus Games of triumph over adversity.

Mission Motorsport, The Forces' Motorsport Charity, held trials to select four drivers from the Armed Forces who were best suited for the experience. George and Jason Wolfe were then partnered with the amateur drivers to mentor and coach them in the British GT Championship. George coached Steve McCulley and Paul Vice who raced in car 44, while Jason coached Ben Norfolk and Basil Rawlinson in Car 22.

The bespoke Jaguar's were the first SVO-designed race cars to hit a race track, adapted for the four (WIS) drivers allowing them to compete equally with their able-bodied competitors.

George and McCulley came away with a double podium at Oulton Park in GT4 Pro-Am at the opening round of the British GT championship, winning race 1 and a 2nd place in race 2.

== 2016 season ==
=== British GT Championship ===
In 2016, George made his debut season car racing contesting in the 2016 British GT Championship competing as the Pro driver of an Aston Martin Vantage GT4, with James Holder as the Am driver.

=== Gulf 12 Hours ===
In December 2016, George went to the United Arab Emirates with SuperRacing to round off his debut season by competing in the Gulf 12 Hour Race at Yas Marina Circuit in Abu Dhabi, sharing the Generation AMR Aston Martin Vantage GT4 with James Holder & Britcar champion Chris Murphy. George set the fastest (GT4) qualifying lap of 2:20.697 putting the car on pole in the GTX category and setting the fastest lap of the race.

== 2022 season ==
=== British Endurance Championship ===
Alongside managing Venture Innovations, George contested the last three rounds of the 2022 British Endurance Championship in a Mercedes AMG GT4 in class D, coaching co-driver Neville Jones through his debut GT car races. The duo had a podium finish in all three rounds entered and George attained two lap records.

Round 4 was George and Jones first BEC race, the pair picked up the points for second place in Class D and George received the Sunoco Driver of the Day award. for becoming the new GT4 Qualifying Lap Record holder with his qualifying lap of 2:08.556

George stood on the podium again for round 5 at Donington in October where the team collected top points in their Mercedes AMG due to the class winners being an invitation team. George became the then-new GT4 Lap Record holder at Donington Park with a lap time of 1:34.856 on the GP circuit.

The team closed their race season with another class D second place finish in round 6 at Donington to make it a 3 out of 3 podium finish

== 2023 season ==
=== British Endurance Championship ===
As well as managing the 2 car race team, George contested a full season with team Venture Innovations in the British Endurance Championship in the Mercedes AMG GT4 with co-driver Neville Jones and his son Chris.

Round 1 at Silverstone seen the team start the race in 20th position due to a challenging qualifying, George made up eight places and the team finished second in class. George became the new Silverstone GP GT4 Lap Record Holder with a time of 2:09.403.

George and the team clinched the class D (GT4) championship in the final round at Donington Park as well as coming just short of winning the overall title by four points.

== 2024 season ==
=== Hankook 24H Barcelona ===
George competed in the Hankook 24 Hours of Barcelona with Venture Engineering, driving the Vulcan Fasteners Mercedes-AMG GT4. This race marked the team's debut in the series, with George sharing the car alongside teammates Owen Hizzey, Chris Jones and Neville Jones. Despite the team's first appearance, they delivered a stellar performance, winning the GT4 class in a thrilling and closely contested race.
