= Shaun Balfe =

British racing car driver from Grantham

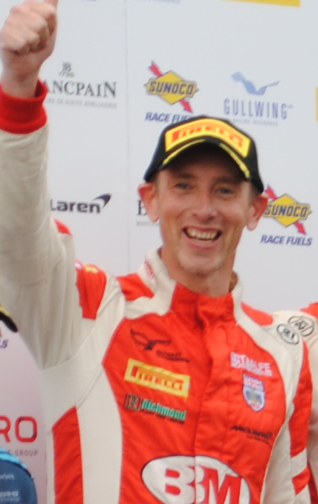
- Balfe on the podium at Donington Park
- Nationality: British
- Born: Shaun David Balfe; 4 June 1972 (age 54) Grantham, England, United Kingdom

British GT Championship career
- Debut season: 1999
- Current team: Balfe Motorsport
- Categorisation: FIA Bronze
- Car number: 22
- Former teams: Eurotech Racing, Rollcentre Racing, Eclipse Motorsport
- Starts: 50
- Wins: 7
- Poles: 7
- Best finish: 2nd in 2003

Previous series
- 2013–17 2005–06: International GT Open; FIA GT

Championship titles
- 2017 2004: International GT Open Pro-Am; Spanish GT Championship

Shaun David Balfe (born 4 June 1972) is a British racing car driver from Grantham who won the 2004 Spanish GT Championship. In 2006 he raced a Saleen S7R for Balfe Motorsport in the FIA GT Championship He currently races in the British GT Championship in a McLaren 720S GT3 with Rob Bell in 2019. He finished third in the GT3 championship that year.

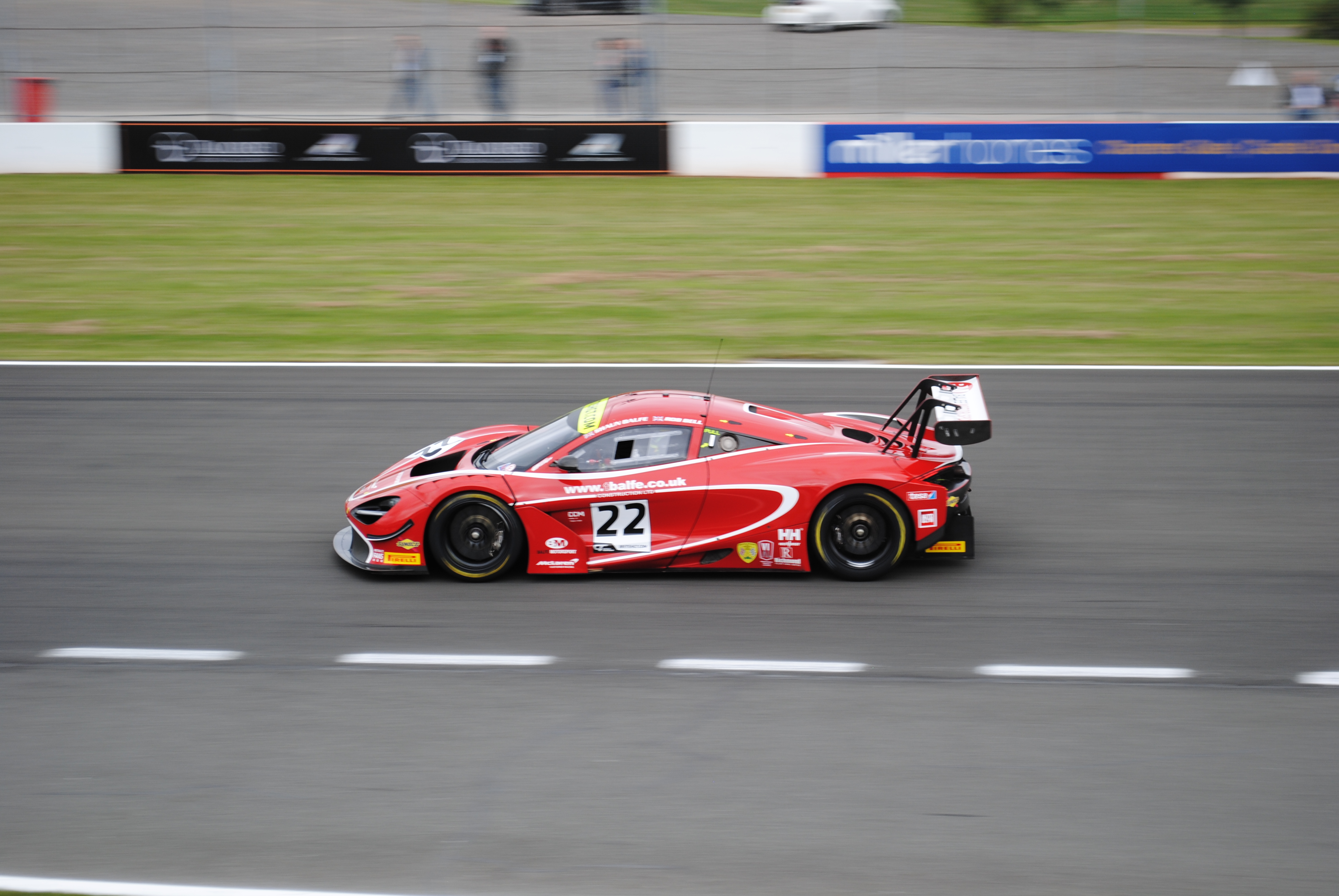
Balfe's McLaren 720S GT3 in the lead of the race at Donington Park.

== Early life ==
Balfe attended Caythorpe primary school and the Sir William Robertson School, where he gained eight GCSEs, with only English Literature at grade C or above.

By 1991, Balfe lived on Rectory Lane in Leadenham, where he took BTEC Building Studies at Grantham College. His father, David Balfe (born 29 September 1951), owned Fortec Motorsport of Grantham. He later studied building management at Nottingham Trent University.

== Racing record ==
=== Complete British GT Championship results ===
(key) (Races in bold indicate pole position) (Races in italics indicate fastest lap)

Year	Team	Car	Class	1	2	3	4	5	6	7	8	9	10	11	12	13	14	15	16	Pos	Points
1999	Barclays Premier	Marcos Mantis	INV	SIL; 1	OUL; 1	SNE; 1	BRH; 1	SIL; 1; 19	DON; 1	DON; 2	SIL; 1	CRO; 1	SPA; 1	SIL; 1; 13						-†	0†
2000	Balfe Motorsport	Lotus Esprit	GTO	THR; 1	CRO; 1	OUL; 1 WD	DON; 1 Ret	SIL; 1 WD	BRH; 1; 23	DON; 1 Ret	CRO; 1 Ret	SIL; 1; 15	SNE; 1 Ret	SPA; 1 Ret	SIL; 1 Ret					28th	10
2001	Paragon/Team Eurotech	Porsche 996 GT3-RS	GTO	SIL; 1; 6	SNE; 1; 10	DON; 1; 9	OUL; 1; 8	CRO; 1; 6	ROC; 1; 9	CAS; 1; 4	BRH; 1; 9	DON; 1; 9	KNO; 1; 12	THR; 1; 9	BRH; 1; 11	SIL; 1; 9				?	?
2003	Rollcentre with Balfe Motorsport	Mosler MT900R	GTO	DON; 1; 1	SNE; 1; 1	**KNO**; **1**; 1	KNO; 2; 1	**SIL**; **1**; 15	CAS; 1 Ret	**OUL**; **1** Ret	**ROC**; **1**; 1	THR; 1; 1	SPA; 1; 8	**BRH**; **1** Ret						2nd	182
2004	Balfe Motorsport	Mosler MT900R	N-GT	DON; 1; 4	DON; 2 Ret	MON; 1	MON; 2	SNE; 1	SNE; 2	CAS; 1	CAS; 2	OUL; 1	OUL; 2	SIL; 1	SIL; 2	**THR**; **1**; 4	THR; 2 DNS	BRH; 1	BRH; 2	29th	10
2005	Eclipse Motorsport	Mosler MT900R	GT2	DON; 1; 7	MAG; 1 (Note: This race consisted of FIA GT and British GT Championship cars. Balfe competed in the FIA GT series at the time.)	CRO; 1	CRO; 2	KNO; 1	KNO; 2	THR; 1	THR; 2	CAS; 1	CAS; 2	SIL; 1	MON; 1	MON; 2	SIL; 1	SIL; 2		26th	2
2013	Balfe Motorsport	Ferrari 458 Italia GT3	GT3	OUL; 1	OUL; 2	ROC; 1; 10	SIL; 1	SNE; 1	SNE; 2	BRH; 1	ZAN; 1	ZAN; 2	DON; 1							32nd	1.5
2018	Balfe Motorsport	McLaren 650S GT3	GT3	OUL; 1; 8	OUL; 2; 12	ROC; 1 Ret	SNE; 1	SNE; 2	SIL; 1; 8	SPA; 1 Ret	BRH; 1	DON; 1								17th	10
2019	Balfe Motorsport	McLaren 720S GT3	GT3	OUL; 1 WD	OUL; 2 WD	SNE; 1; 31	SNE; 2; 3	SIL; 1; 11	DON; 1; 2	SPA; 1; 4	**BRH**; **1**; 2	**DON**; **1**; 1								3rd	126
2020	Balfe Motorsport	McLaren 720S GT3	GT3	OUL; 1	OUL; 2	DON; 1	DON; 2	BRH; 1	DON; 1	SNE; 1	SNE; 2	SIL; 1 Ret								NC†	0†
2022	Balfe Motorsport	Audi R8 LMS Evo II	GT3	**OUL**; **1**; **1**	OUL; 2; 2	SIL; 1 Ret	DON; 1; 8	SNE; 1	SNE; 2	SPA; 1	BRH; 1	DON; 1								15th	49
2023	Barwell Motorsport	Lamborghini Huracán GT3 Evo 2	GT3	OUL; 1; 12	OUL; 2; 7	SIL; 1; 2	**DON**; **1**; **7**	SNE; 1; 1	SNE; 2; 9	ALG; 1; 3	BRH; 1; 5	DON; 1; 1								4th	144

† Not eligible for points.
^{*} Season still in progress.

=== Complete FIA GT Championship results ===
(key) (Races in bold indicate pole position) (Races in italics indicate fastest lap)

Year	Team	Car	Class	1	2	3	4	5	6	7	8	9	10	11	Pos	Points
2005	Balfe Motorsport	Mosler MT900R	G2	MON; NC	MAG; Ret	SIL; 11	IMO; 9	BRN; 11	SPA	OSC; 14	IST	ZHU	DUB	BAH	NC†	0†
2006	Balfe Motorsport	Saleen S7-R	GT1	SIL; 9	BRN; Ret	OSC; 8	SPA	PAU; Ret	DIJ; Ret	MUG; 8	BUD; 9	ADR	DUB		40th	2

† Not eligible for points as a national championship entry.
