= 2026 6 Hours of Barcelona =

Sports car endurance race

(Spain) 2026 6 Hours of Barcelona
Event information
- Round 7 of 8 in the 2026 FIA World Endurance Championship
- Date: 18 October 2026
- Location: Montmeló, Barcelona, Catalonia, Spain
- Venue: Circuit de Barcelona-Catalunya
- Duration: 6 hours

Results
- Laps completed: 198
- Distance (km): 922.09
- Distance (miles): 573.01
- Hypercar

Pole position
- Time: 1:30.166
- Team: (South Korea) Genesis Magma Racing
- Drivers: (Brazil) Pipo Derani (France) Mathys Jaubert (Germany) André Lotterer

Winners
- Team: (Japan) Toyota Racing
- Drivers: (Switzerland) Sébastien Buemi (New Zealand) Brendon Hartley (Japan) Ryō Hirakawa
- LMGT3

Winners
- Team: (Germany) The Bend Manthey
- Drivers: (Austria) Richard Lietz (Italy) Riccardo Pera (Australia) Yasser Shahin

The 2026 6 Hours of Barcelona was an endurance sportscar racing event held on 18 October 2026, as the seventh of eight rounds of the 2026 FIA World Endurance Championship. It was the first running of the event in its current format in the World Endurance Championship.

== Entry list ==
The entry list consisted of 35 cars, with 17 in Hypercar and 18 in LMGT3.

== Schedule ==
Date	Time (local: CEST)	Event
Friday, 16 October	11:30	Free Practice 1
Friday, 16 October	16:30	Free Practice 2
Saturday, 17 October	08:50	Free Practice 3 - LMGT3
Saturday, 17 October	11:50	Qualifying - LMGT3
Saturday, 17 October	12:10	Hyperpole - LMGT3
Saturday, 17 October	12:40	Free Practice 3 - Hypercar
Saturday, 17 October	15:40	Qualifying - Hypercar
Saturday, 17 October	16:00	Hyperpole - Hypercar
Sunday, 18 October	12:00	Race

== Practice ==
Three practice sessions were held: two were held on Friday, and one was held on Saturday. The third practice session was held separately for LMGT3 then Hypercar. The sessions on Friday morning and Friday afternoon lasted 90 minutes, while the Saturday sessions lasted 60 minutes.

=== Practice 1 ===
Class	No.	Entrant	Driver	Time
Hypercar	83	(Italy) AF Corse	(Poland) Robert Kubica	1:31.891
LMGT3	21	(Italy) Vista AF Corse	(Italy) Alessio Rovera	1:41.420

- Note: Only the fastest car in each class is shown.

=== Practice 2 ===
Class	No.	Entrant	Driver	Time
Hypercar	007	(United States) Aston Martin THOR Team	(United Kingdom) Harry Tincknell	1:31.712
LMGT3	58	(United Kingdom) Garage 59	(Germany) Finn Gehrsitz	1:41.650

- Note: Only the fastest car in each class is shown.

=== Practice 3 ===
Class	No.	Entrant	Driver	Time
Hypercar	50	(Italy) Ferrari AF Corse	(Italy) Antonio Fuoco	1:31.026
LMGT3	21	(Italy) Vista AF Corse	(United States) Simon Mann	1:41.696

- Note: Only the fastest car in each class is shown.

== Qualifying ==
Qualifying was scheduled to start at 11:50 CEST on Saturday, with one twelve-minute qualifying session and one ten-minute hyperpole session per class, resulting in two qualifying and two hyperpole sessions in total.

=== Qualifying results ===
Pole position winners in each class are marked in bold.

Pos	Class	No.	Entrant	Qualifying	Hyperpole	Grid
1	**Hypercar**	**17**	**(South Korea) Genesis Magma Racing**	**1:30.658**	**1:30.166**	1
2	Hypercar	8	(Japan) Toyota Racing	1:30.623	1:30.336	2
3	Hypercar	19	(South Korea) Genesis Magma Racing	1:30.479	1:30.490	3
4	Hypercar	35	(France) Alpine Endurance Team	1:31.365	1:30.722	4
5	Hypercar	12	(United States) Cadillac Hertz Team Jota	1:31.116	1:30.784	5
6	Hypercar	83	(Italy) Ferrari AF Corse	1:31.411	1:30.804	6
7	Hypercar	36	(France) Alpine Endurance Team	1:31.161	1:30.814	7
8	Hypercar	50	(Italy) Ferrari AF Corse	1:31.149	1:30.836	8
9	Hypercar	7	(Japan) Toyota Racing	1:31.355	1:30.953	9
10	Hypercar	38	(United States) Cadillac Hertz Team Jota	1:30.983	1:31.065	10
11	Hypercar	009	(United States) Aston Martin THOR Team	1:31.443		11
12	Hypercar	007	(United States) Aston Martin THOR Team	1:31.464		12
13	Hypercar	51	(Italy) Ferrari AF Corse	1:31.508		14^{1}
14	Hypercar	20	(Germany) BMW M Team WRT	1:31.571		13
15	Hypercar	94	(France) Peugeot TotalEnergies	1:31.628		15
16	Hypercar	15	(Germany) BMW M Team WRT	1:31.650		16
17	Hypercar	93	(France) Peugeot TotalEnergies	1:31.713		17
18	**LMGT3**	**10**	**(United Kingdom) Garage 59**	**1:43.032**	**1:40.933**	18
19	LMGT3	92	(Germany) The Bend Manthey	1:42.954	1:41.055	19
20	LMGT3	21	(Italy) Vista AF Corse	1:42.678	1:41.398	20
21	LMGT3	33	(United Kingdom) TF Sport	1:42.920	1:41.447	21
22	LMGT3	61	(Italy) Iron Lynx	1:42.968	1:41.625	22
23	LMGT3	32	(Belgium) Team WRT	1:42.971	1:41.698	23
24	LMGT3	87	(France) Akkodis ASP Team	1:42.922	1:41.894	24
25	LMGT3	77	(Germany) Proton Competition	1:43.106	1:41.956	25
26	LMGT3	88	(Germany) Proton Competition	1:42.624	1:42.222	26
27	LMGT3	34	Racing Team Turkey by TF	1:42.082	1:42.772	27
28	LMGT3	78	(France) Akkodis ASP Team	1:43.124		28
29	LMGT3	91	(Germany) Manthey DK Engineering	1:43.169		29
30	LMGT3	54	(Italy) Vista AF Corse	1:43.332		30
31	LMGT3	23	(United States) Heart of Racing Team	1:43.513		31
32	LMGT3	69	(Belgium) Team WRT	1:43.975		32
33	LMGT3	58	(United Kingdom) Garage 59	1:44.267		33
34	LMGT3	79	(Italy) Iron Lynx	1:44.655		34
35	LMGT3	27	(United States) Heart of Racing Team	1:49.121		35

- **^1** – The #51 Ferrari AF Corse originally qualified 13th, but was given a 1-place grid penalty for impeding the #93 Peugeot TotalEnergies in qualifying.

== Race ==
=== Race results ===
Class winners are in bold and ‡.

Pos	Class	No.	Team	Drivers	Chassis	Tyre	Laps	Time/Reason
Pos	Class	No.	Team	Drivers	Engine	Tyre	Laps	Time/Reason
1	**Hypercar**	**8**	**(Japan) Toyota Racing**	**(Switzerland) Sébastien Buemi** **(New Zealand) Brendon Hartley** **(Japan) Ryō Hirakawa**	**Toyota TR010 Hybrid**	M	**198**	**6:01:20.906‡**
1	**Hypercar**	**8**	**(Japan) Toyota Racing**	**(Switzerland) Sébastien Buemi** **(New Zealand) Brendon Hartley** **(Japan) Ryō Hirakawa**	**Toyota H8909 3.5 L Turbo V6**	M	**198**	**6:01:20.906‡**
2	Hypercar	7	(Japan) Toyota Racing	(United Kingdom) Mike Conway (Japan) Kamui Kobayashi (Netherlands) Nyck de Vries	Toyota TR010 Hybrid	M	198	+0.583
2	Hypercar	7	(Japan) Toyota Racing	(United Kingdom) Mike Conway (Japan) Kamui Kobayashi (Netherlands) Nyck de Vries	Toyota H8909 3.5 L Turbo V6	M	198	+0.583
3	Hypercar	50	(Italy) Ferrari AF Corse	(Italy) Antonio Fuoco (Spain) Miguel Molina (Denmark) Nicklas Nielsen	Ferrari 499P	M	198	+39.725
3	Hypercar	50	(Italy) Ferrari AF Corse	(Italy) Antonio Fuoco (Spain) Miguel Molina (Denmark) Nicklas Nielsen	Ferrari F163CG 3.0 L Turbo V6	M	198	+39.725
4	Hypercar	38	(United States) Cadillac Hertz Team Jota	(United Kingdom) Jack Aitken (New Zealand) Earl Bamber (France) Sébastien Bourdais	Cadillac V-Series.R	M	198	+52.811
4	Hypercar	38	(United States) Cadillac Hertz Team Jota	(United Kingdom) Jack Aitken (New Zealand) Earl Bamber (France) Sébastien Bourdais	Cadillac LMC55R 5.5 L V8	M	198	+52.811
5	Hypercar	83	(Italy) AF Corse	(United Kingdom) Phil Hanson (Poland) Robert Kubica (China) Yifei Ye	Ferrari 499P	M	198	+53.353
5	Hypercar	83	(Italy) AF Corse	(United Kingdom) Phil Hanson (Poland) Robert Kubica (China) Yifei Ye	Ferrari F163CG 3.0 L Turbo V6	M	198	+53.353
6	Hypercar	12	(United States) Cadillac Hertz Team Jota	(United Kingdom) Alex Lynn (France) Norman Nato (United Kingdom) Will Stevens	Cadillac V-Series.R	M	198	+1:20.751
6	Hypercar	12	(United States) Cadillac Hertz Team Jota	(United Kingdom) Alex Lynn (France) Norman Nato (United Kingdom) Will Stevens	Cadillac LMC55R 5.5 L V8	M	198	+1:20.751
7	Hypercar	15	(Germany) BMW M Team WRT	(Denmark) Kevin Magnussen (Switzerland) Raffaele Marciello (Belgium) Dries Vanthoor	BMW M Hybrid V8	M	198	+1:32.135
7	Hypercar	15	(Germany) BMW M Team WRT	(Denmark) Kevin Magnussen (Switzerland) Raffaele Marciello (Belgium) Dries Vanthoor	BMW P66/3 4.0 L Turbo V8	M	198	+1:32.135
8	Hypercar	36	(France) Alpine Endurance Team	(France) Jules Gounon (France) Victor Martins	Alpine A424	M	198	+1:32.956
8	Hypercar	36	(France) Alpine Endurance Team	(France) Jules Gounon (France) Victor Martins	Alpine V634 3.4 L Turbo V6	M	198	+1:32.956
9	Hypercar	009	(United States) Aston Martin THOR Team	(Spain) Alex Riberas (Denmark) Marco Sørensen	Aston Martin Valkyrie	M	197	+1 Lap
9	Hypercar	009	(United States) Aston Martin THOR Team	(Spain) Alex Riberas (Denmark) Marco Sørensen	Aston Martin RA 6.5 L V12	M	197	+1 Lap
10	Hypercar	35	(France) Alpine Endurance Team	(Austria) Ferdinand Habsburg (France) Charles Milesi	Alpine A424	M	197	+1 Lap
10	Hypercar	35	(France) Alpine Endurance Team	(Austria) Ferdinand Habsburg (France) Charles Milesi	Alpine V634 3.4 L Turbo V6	M	197	+1 Lap
11	Hypercar	19	(South Korea) Genesis Magma Racing	(France) Paul-Loup Chatin (France) Mathieu Jaminet (Spain) Daniel Juncadella	Genesis GMR-001	M	197	+1 Lap
11	Hypercar	19	(South Korea) Genesis Magma Racing	(France) Paul-Loup Chatin (France) Mathieu Jaminet (Spain) Daniel Juncadella	Genesis G8MR 3.2 L Turbo V8	M	197	+1 Lap
12	Hypercar	93	(France) Peugeot TotalEnergies	(New Zealand) Nick Cassidy (United Kingdom) Paul di Resta (Belgium) Stoffel Vandoorne	Peugeot 9X8	M	197	+1 Lap
12	Hypercar	93	(France) Peugeot TotalEnergies	(New Zealand) Nick Cassidy (United Kingdom) Paul di Resta (Belgium) Stoffel Vandoorne	Peugeot X6H 2.6 L Turbo V6	M	197	+1 Lap
13	Hypercar	94	(France) Peugeot TotalEnergies	(France) Loïc Duval (Denmark) Malthe Jakobsen (France) Théo Pourchaire	Peugeot 9X8	M	197	+1 Lap
13	Hypercar	94	(France) Peugeot TotalEnergies	(France) Loïc Duval (Denmark) Malthe Jakobsen (France) Théo Pourchaire	Peugeot X6H 2.6 L Turbo V6	M	197	+1 Lap
14	Hypercar	20	(Germany) BMW M Team WRT	(Netherlands) Robin Frijns (Germany) René Rast (South Africa) Sheldon van der Linde	BMW M Hybrid V8	M	196	+2 Laps
14	Hypercar	20	(Germany) BMW M Team WRT	(Netherlands) Robin Frijns (Germany) René Rast (South Africa) Sheldon van der Linde	BMW P66/3 4.0 L Turbo V8	M	196	+2 Laps
15	Hypercar	51	(Italy) Ferrari AF Corse	(United Kingdom) James Calado (Italy) Antonio Giovinazzi (Italy) Alessandro Pier Guidi	Ferrari 499P	M	195	+3 Laps
15	Hypercar	51	(Italy) Ferrari AF Corse	(United Kingdom) James Calado (Italy) Antonio Giovinazzi (Italy) Alessandro Pier Guidi	Ferrari F163CG 3.0 L Turbo V6	M	195	+3 Laps
16	Hypercar	17	(South Korea) Genesis Magma Racing	(Brazil) Pipo Derani (France) Mathys Jaubert (Germany) André Lotterer	Genesis GMR-001	M	195	+3 Lps
16	Hypercar	17	(South Korea) Genesis Magma Racing	(Brazil) Pipo Derani (France) Mathys Jaubert (Germany) André Lotterer	Genesis G8MR 3.2 L Turbo V8	M	195	+3 Lps
17	**LMGT3**	**92**	**(Germany) The Bend Manthey**	**(Austria) Richard Lietz** **(Italy) Riccardo Pera** **(Australia) Yasser Shahin**	**Porsche 911 GT3 R (992.2)**	G	**183**	**+15 Laps‡**
17	**LMGT3**	**92**	**(Germany) The Bend Manthey**	**(Austria) Richard Lietz** **(Italy) Riccardo Pera** **(Australia) Yasser Shahin**	**Porsche M97/80 4.2 L Flat-6**	G	**183**	**+15 Laps‡**
18	LMGT3	10	(United Kingdom) Garage 59	(Hong Kong) Antares Au (United Kingdom) Tom Fleming (Germany) Marvin Kirchhöfer	McLaren 720S GT3 Evo	G	183	+15 Laps
18	LMGT3	10	(United Kingdom) Garage 59	(Hong Kong) Antares Au (United Kingdom) Tom Fleming (Germany) Marvin Kirchhöfer	McLaren M840T 4.0 L Turbo V8	G	183	+15 Laps
19	LMGT3	69	(Belgium) Team WRT	(United Kingdom) Dan Harper (United States) Anthony McIntosh (Canada) Parker Thompson	BMW M4 GT3 Evo	G	183	+15 Laps
19	LMGT3	69	(Belgium) Team WRT	(United Kingdom) Dan Harper (United States) Anthony McIntosh (Canada) Parker Thompson	BMW P58 3.0 L Turbo I6	G	183	+15 Laps
20	LMGT3	34	Racing Team Turkey by TF	(Republic of Ireland) Peter Dempsey (Republic of Ireland) Charlie Eastwood (Turkey) Salih Yoluç	Chevrolet Corvette Z06 GT3.R	G	183	+15 Laps
20	LMGT3	34	Racing Team Turkey by TF	(Republic of Ireland) Peter Dempsey (Republic of Ireland) Charlie Eastwood (Turkey) Salih Yoluç	Chevrolet LT6.R 5.5 L V8	G	183	+15 Laps
21	LMGT3	21	(Italy) Vista AF Corse	(France) François Hériau (United States) Simon Mann (Italy) Alessio Rovera	Ferrari 296 GT3 Evo	G	183	+15 Laps
21	LMGT3	21	(Italy) Vista AF Corse	(France) François Hériau (United States) Simon Mann (Italy) Alessio Rovera	Ferrari F163CE 3.0 L Turbo V6	G	183	+15 Laps
22	LMGT3	61	(Italy) Iron Lynx	(Angola) Rui Andrade (Australia) Martin Berry (Belgium) Maxime Martin	Mercedes-AMG GT3 Evo	G	183	+15 Laps
22	LMGT3	61	(Italy) Iron Lynx	(Angola) Rui Andrade (Australia) Martin Berry (Belgium) Maxime Martin	Mercedes-AMG M159 6.2 L V8	G	183	+15 Laps
23	LMGT3	33	(United Kingdom) TF Sport	(United Kingdom) Jonny Edgar (Netherlands) Nicky Catsburg (United States) Ben Keating	Chevrolet Corvette Z06 GT3.R	G	183	+15 Laps
23	LMGT3	33	(United Kingdom) TF Sport	(United Kingdom) Jonny Edgar (Netherlands) Nicky Catsburg (United States) Ben Keating	Chevrolet LT6.R 5.5 L V8	G	183	+15 Laps
24	LMGT3	88	(Germany) Proton Competition	(Italy) Stefano Gattuso (Italy) Giammarco Levorato (United States) Logan Sargeant	Ford Mustang GT3 Evo	G	182	+16 Laps
24	LMGT3	88	(Germany) Proton Competition	(Italy) Stefano Gattuso (Italy) Giammarco Levorato (United States) Logan Sargeant	Ford Coyote 5.4 L V8	G	182	+16 Laps
25	LMGT3	79	(Italy) Iron Lynx	(Italy) Matteo Cressoni (Netherlands) Lin Hodenius (Italy) Johannes Zelger	Mercedes-AMG GT3 Evo	G	182	+16 Laps
25	LMGT3	79	(Italy) Iron Lynx	(Italy) Matteo Cressoni (Netherlands) Lin Hodenius (Italy) Johannes Zelger	Mercedes-AMG M159 6.2 L V8	G	182	+16 Laps
26	LMGT3	23	(United States) Heart of Racing Team	(United Kingdom) Jonny Adam (Brazil) Eduardo Barrichello (United States) Gray Newell	Aston Martin Vantage AMR GT3 Evo	G	182	+16 Laps
26	LMGT3	23	(United States) Heart of Racing Team	(United Kingdom) Jonny Adam (Brazil) Eduardo Barrichello (United States) Gray Newell	Aston Martin M177 4.0 L Turbo V8	G	182	+16 Laps
27	LMGT3	58	(United Kingdom) Garage 59	(Germany) Finn Gehrsitz (Germany) Benjamin Goethe (Sweden) Alexander West	McLaren 720S GT3 Evo	G	182	+16 Laps
27	LMGT3	58	(United Kingdom) Garage 59	(Germany) Finn Gehrsitz (Germany) Benjamin Goethe (Sweden) Alexander West	McLaren M840T 4.0 L Turbo V8	G	182	+16 Laps
28	LMGT3	32	(Belgium) Team WRT	(Brazil) Augusto Farfus (Indonesia) Sean Gelael (United Kingdom) Darren Leung	BMW M4 GT3 Evo	G	182	+16 Laps
28	LMGT3	32	(Belgium) Team WRT	(Brazil) Augusto Farfus (Indonesia) Sean Gelael (United Kingdom) Darren Leung	BMW P58 3.0 L Turbo I6	G	182	+16 Laps
29	LMGT3	54	(Italy) Vista AF Corse	(Italy) Francesco Castellacci (Switzerland) Thomas Flohr (Italy) Davide Rigon	Ferrari 296 GT3 Evo	G	181	+17 Laps
29	LMGT3	54	(Italy) Vista AF Corse	(Italy) Francesco Castellacci (Switzerland) Thomas Flohr (Italy) Davide Rigon	Ferrari F163CE 3.0 L Turbo V6	G	181	+17 Laps
30	LMGT3	87	(France) Akkodis ASP Team	(Argentina) José María López (Austria) Clemens Schmid (Romania) Răzvan Umbrărescu	Lexus RC F GT3	G	180	+18 Laps
30	LMGT3	87	(France) Akkodis ASP Team	(Argentina) José María López (Austria) Clemens Schmid (Romania) Răzvan Umbrărescu	Lexus 2UR-GSE 5.4 L V8	G	180	+18 Laps
31	LMGT3	78	(France) Akkodis ASP Team	(France) Hadrien David (France) Esteban Masson (Belgium) Tom Van Rompuy	Lexus RC F GT3	G	179	+19 Laps
31	LMGT3	78	(France) Akkodis ASP Team	(France) Hadrien David (France) Esteban Masson (Belgium) Tom Van Rompuy	Lexus 2UR-GSE 5.4 L V8	G	179	+19 Laps
32	LMGT3	27	(United States) Heart of Racing Team	(Italy) Mattia Drudi (United Kingdom) Ian James (Canada) Zacharie Robichon	McLaren 720S GT3 Evo	G	178	+20 Laps
32	LMGT3	27	(United States) Heart of Racing Team	(Italy) Mattia Drudi (United Kingdom) Ian James (Canada) Zacharie Robichon	McLaren M840T 4.0 L Turbo V8	G	178	+20 Laps
33	LMGT3	91	(Germany) Manthey DK Engineering	Timur Boguslavskiy (United Kingdom) James Cottingham (Turkey) Ayhancan Güven	Porsche 911 GT3 R (992.2)	G	174	+24 Laps
33	LMGT3	91	(Germany) Manthey DK Engineering	Timur Boguslavskiy (United Kingdom) James Cottingham (Turkey) Ayhancan Güven	Porsche M97/80 4.2 L Flat-6	G	174	+24 Laps
DNF	LMGT3	77	(Germany) Proton Competition	(United States) Eric Powell (United Kingdom) Sebastian Priaulx (United Kingdom) Ben Tuck	Ford Mustang GT3 Evo	G	181	
DNF	LMGT3	77	(Germany) Proton Competition	(United States) Eric Powell (United Kingdom) Sebastian Priaulx (United Kingdom) Ben Tuck	Ford Coyote 5.4 L V8	G	181	
DNF	Hypercar	007	(United States) Aston Martin THOR Team	(United Kingdom) Tom Gamble (United Kingdom) Harry Tincknell	Aston Martin Valkyrie	M	115	
DNF	Hypercar	007	(United States) Aston Martin THOR Team	(United Kingdom) Tom Gamble (United Kingdom) Harry Tincknell	Aston Martin RA 6.5 L V12	M	115	

FIA World Endurance Championship
Previous race: 2026 6 Hours of Fuji	2026 season	Next race: 2026 6 Hours of Monza
