= Earl Bamber =

New Zealand racing driver

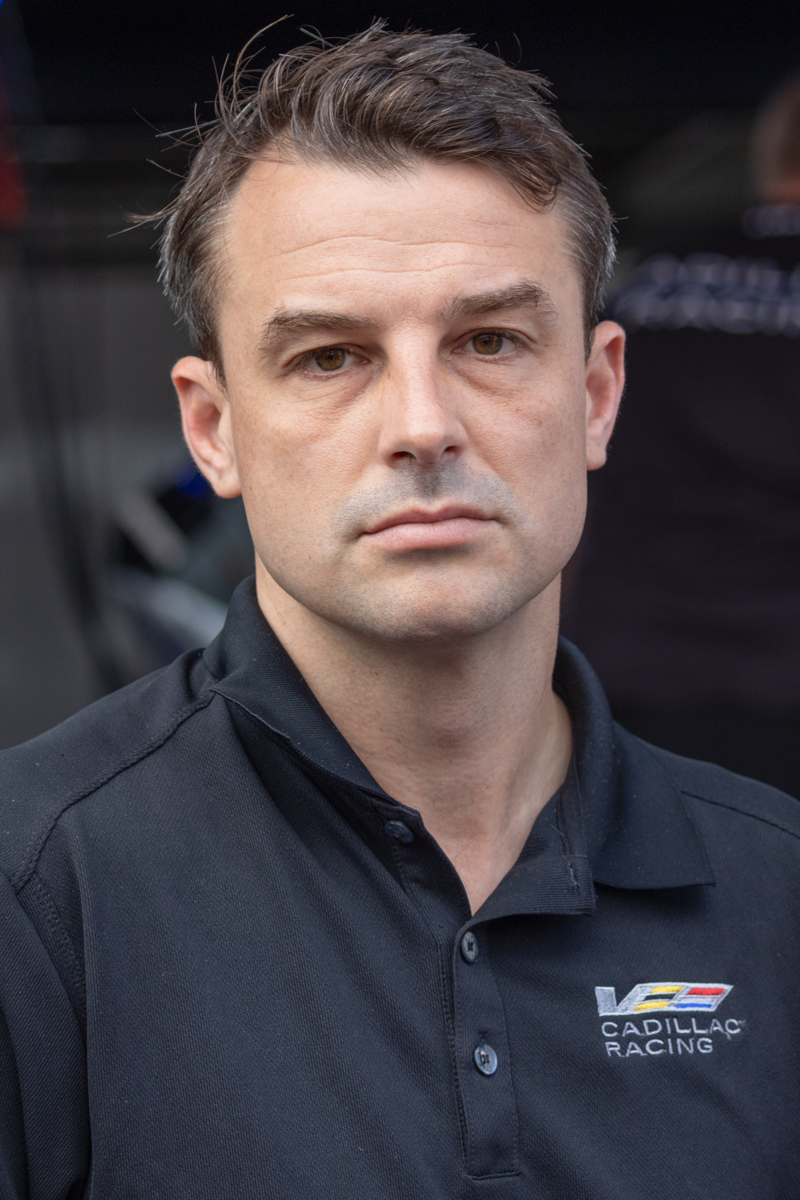
- Bamber at the 2024 6 Hours of Fuji
- Nationality: New Zealander
- Born: Earl Anderson Bamber; 9 July 1990 (age 36) Whanganui, New Zealand
- Relatives: Will Bamber (brother)
- Categorisation: FIA Silver (until 2014); FIA Gold (2015); FIA Platinum (2016–)

24 Hours of Le Mans career
- Years: 2015–2025
- Teams: Porsche, Cadillac
- Best finish: 1st (2015, 2017)
- Class wins: 2 (2015, 2017)

IMSA SportsCar Championship career
- Debut season: 2014
- Current team: Cadillac Whelen
- Car number: 31
- Starts: 87
- Wins: 6 (GTLM), 1 (DPi), 4 (GTP)
- Poles: 5 (GTLM), 4 (GTP)
- Fastest laps: 5 (GTLM), 2 (DPi), 4 (GTP)
- Best finish: 1st in 2019 (GTLM)

Porsche Supercup career
- Debut season: 2014
- Teams: FACH Auto Tech
- Car number: 19 (2014)
- Starts: 13 (8 Podiums)
- Wins: 2
- Poles: 3
- Fastest laps: 3
- Best finish: 1st in 2014

Championship titles
- 2014: Porsche Supercup Drivers Championship

Awards
- 2014: Porsche Supercup Rookie Classification

Porsche Carrera Cup Asia career
- Debut season: 2013
- Teams: Nexus Racing (2013), LKM Racing (2014)
- Car number: 7 (2013), 1 (2014)
- Starts: 22 (21 Podiums)
- Wins: 14
- Poles: 11
- Fastest laps: 11
- Best finish: 1st in 2013, 2014

Championship titles
- 2013, 2014: Porsche Carrera Cup Asia Drivers Championship

NASCAR O'Reilly Auto Parts Series career
- 1 race run over 1 year
- 2020 position: 62nd
- Best finish: 62nd (2020)
- First race: 2020 UNOH 188 (Daytona RC)
Wins	Top tens	Poles
0	0	0

Porsche Carrera Cup Asia career
- Debut season: 2013
- Current team: Nexus Racing
- Car number: 7
- Former teams: Team Meritus; International Motorsport; Triple X Motorsport
- Starts: 12
- Wins: 5
- Poles: 7
- Fastest laps: 3
- Best finish: 1st in 2010 Toyota Racing Series

Previous series
- 2009 2008–09 2008–09 2008–09 2008 2008 2007–08 2006–07–2010 2006 2005–06 2005–06: Euroseries 3000; GP2 Asia Series; A1 Grand Prix; Int. Formula Master; Australian Formula Three; Formula Master Italia; Formula V6 Asia; Toyota Racing Series; Formula BMW Asia; New Zealand Formula Ford; South Island Formula Ford

Championship titles
- 2006: Formula BMW Asia

Awards
- 2008: Lady Wigram Trophy
- Statistics up to date as of 9 November 2020.

Earl Anderson Bamber (born 9 July 1990) is a New Zealand professional racing driver and racing team owner who currently competes in the IMSA SportsCar Championship and the FIA World Endurance Championship for Cadillac Hertz Team Jota and Cadillac Whelen. He is a factory driver for Corvette Racing, having previously driven in a factory capacity for Porsche.

Bamber is a two-time winner of the 24 Hours of Le Mans for Porsche, having won in 2015 alongside Nico Hülkenberg and Nick Tandy and in 2017 with Timo Bernhard and Brendon Hartley. He also became overall champion of the 2017 FIA World Endurance Championship alongside the latter trio. Bamber also won the IMSA SportsCar Championship in the GTLM class in 2019, as well as the Nürburgring 24 Hours in 2023. Prior to his endurance racing career, he was champion of the 2014 Porsche Supercup and won the Porsche Carrera Cup Asia twice in 2013 and 2014.

== Early life ==
Earl Bamber was born in Whanganui, New Zealand, to Paul and Maureen Bamber (née Johnson), and lived on a farm where he learned to drive in the small settlement of Jerusalem on the Whanganui River. He attended Wanganui Collegiate School along with his younger brother, Will. Bamber began in kart racing and won his first title aged 12, at the North Island Sprint Championships (Junior 100cc Yamaha Restricted), and his first national title at the 2004 Sprint Kart Championship meeting in Auckland. Later that year, he secured a podium at the Rotax Max category's annual Grand Final in Portugal after dominating the Junior class in the 2004 Rotax Max Challenge of New Zealand.

== Racing career ==
=== Open-wheel racing ===
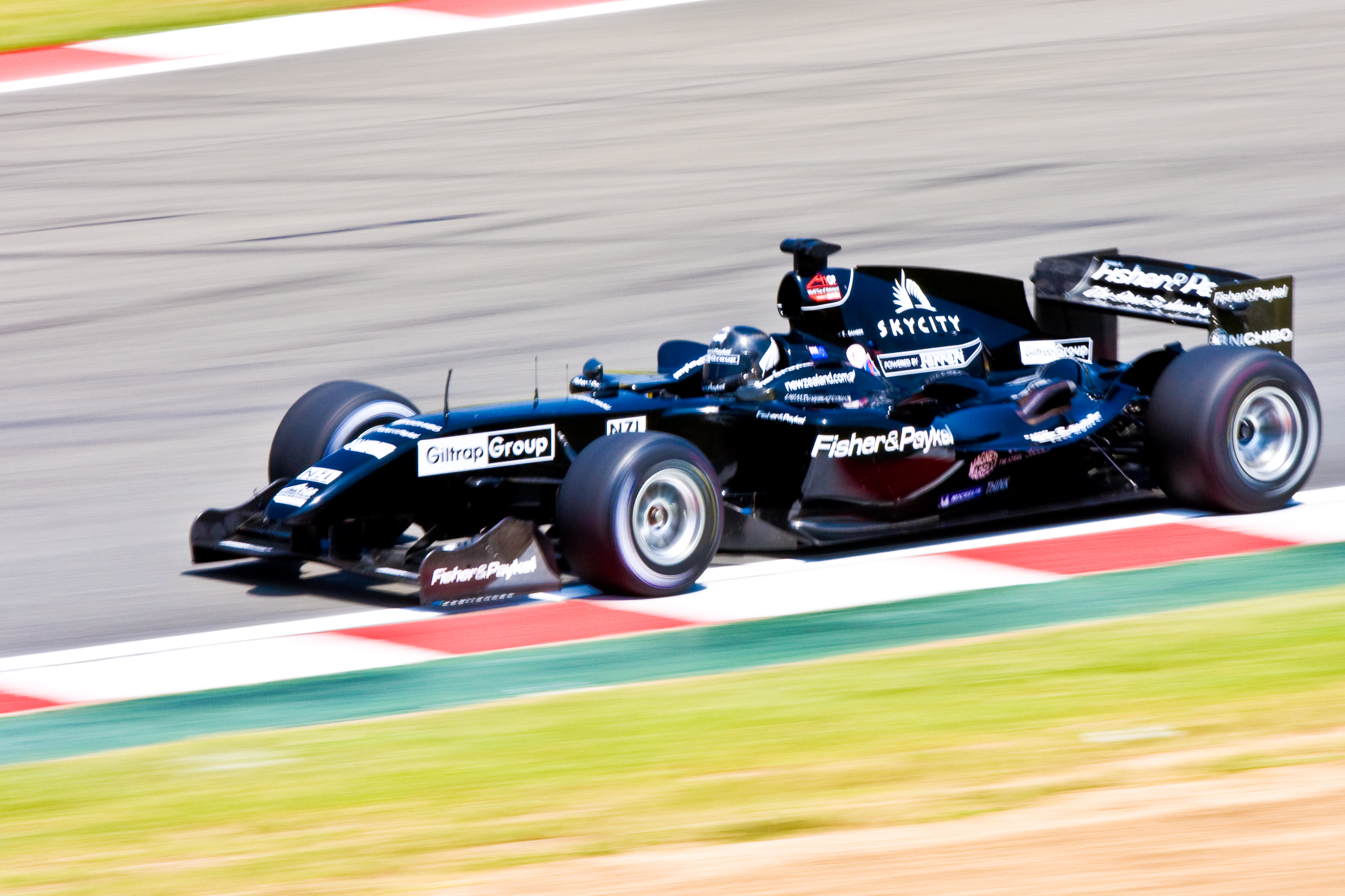
Bamber competing for A1 Team New Zealand at the 2008–09 A1 Grand Prix of Nations, South Africa

Bamber progressed through karts and single seater series and was ranked sixth highest future star in the world by the internationally recognised website driverdb.com in 2008. At the age of 15, he switched to the New Zealand Formula Ford Championship before competing in Asia two years later, where he won the Asian Formula BMW title. He achieved pole positions, fastest laps and podium results in Formula Renault V6 and Australian Formula 3, despite a tight budget. In 2008, he won two vice-championship trophies – in Formula Renault V6 Asia and Toyota Racing Series New Zealand. Bamber contested several rounds of the international A1 Grand Prix series for the New Zealand team in 2009, finishing on the podium three times. He also stood on the podium in GP2 Asia, at the age of 19. In 2010, he repeated his 2008 success and was again crowned runner-up in the New Zealand Toyota Racing Series.

=== Sportscar racing ===
==== 2013 ====
In 2013, Bamber made his first appearance in Porsche's one make series in the Porsche Carrera Cup Asia with Malaysian team, Nexus Racing. He battled all season with Martin Ragginger but eventually won the drivers championship. Bamber was also successful in endurance racing, winning the Bathurst 12 Hour (Class B) with Grove Racing, alongside team owner and Carrera Cup Australia regular Stephen Grove and eventual Supercup rival Ben Barker. He was subsequently selected to race in three Porsche Supercup meetings. Bamber's inaugural sportscar racing season ended with victory in the Carrera Cup Asia race at the 60th Macau Grand Prix meeting, defeating nine-time World Rally Champion Sébastien Loeb in the process.

Porsche Carrera Cup Asia nominated Bamber for the Porsche Motorsport International Cup Scholarship shootout in Oschersleben, Germany, where he beat seven other top pilots from Porsche one-make cups series around the world. Part of the selection process included the simulation of a qualifying session as well as an entire race. He received funding of 200,000 Euros for his 2014 Porsche Supercup season campaign the following season.

==== 2014 ====
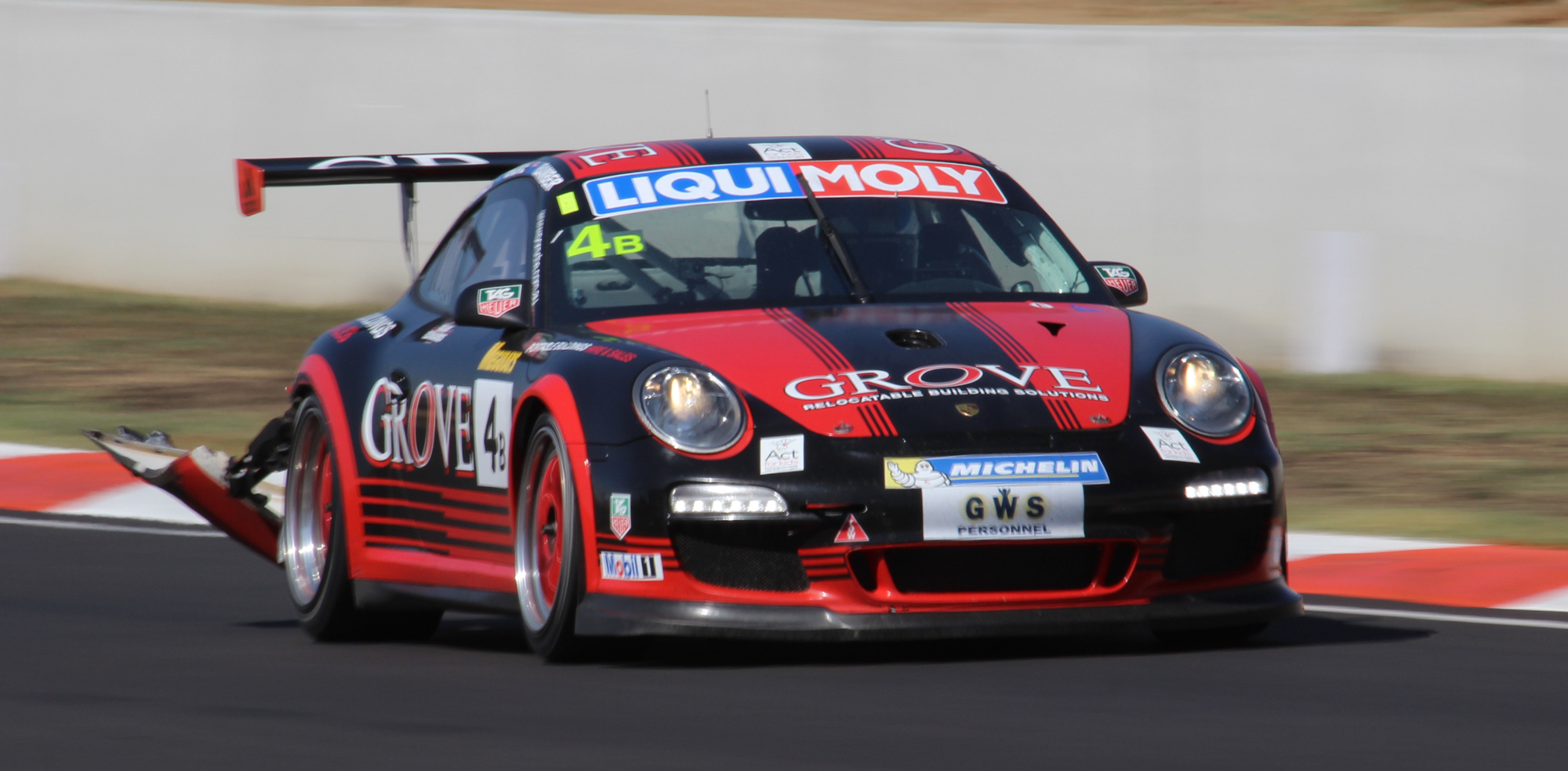
The Porsche 997 GT3-R Cup of Earl Bamber, Ben Barker and Stephen Grove at the 2014 Liqui Moly Bathurst 12 Hour.

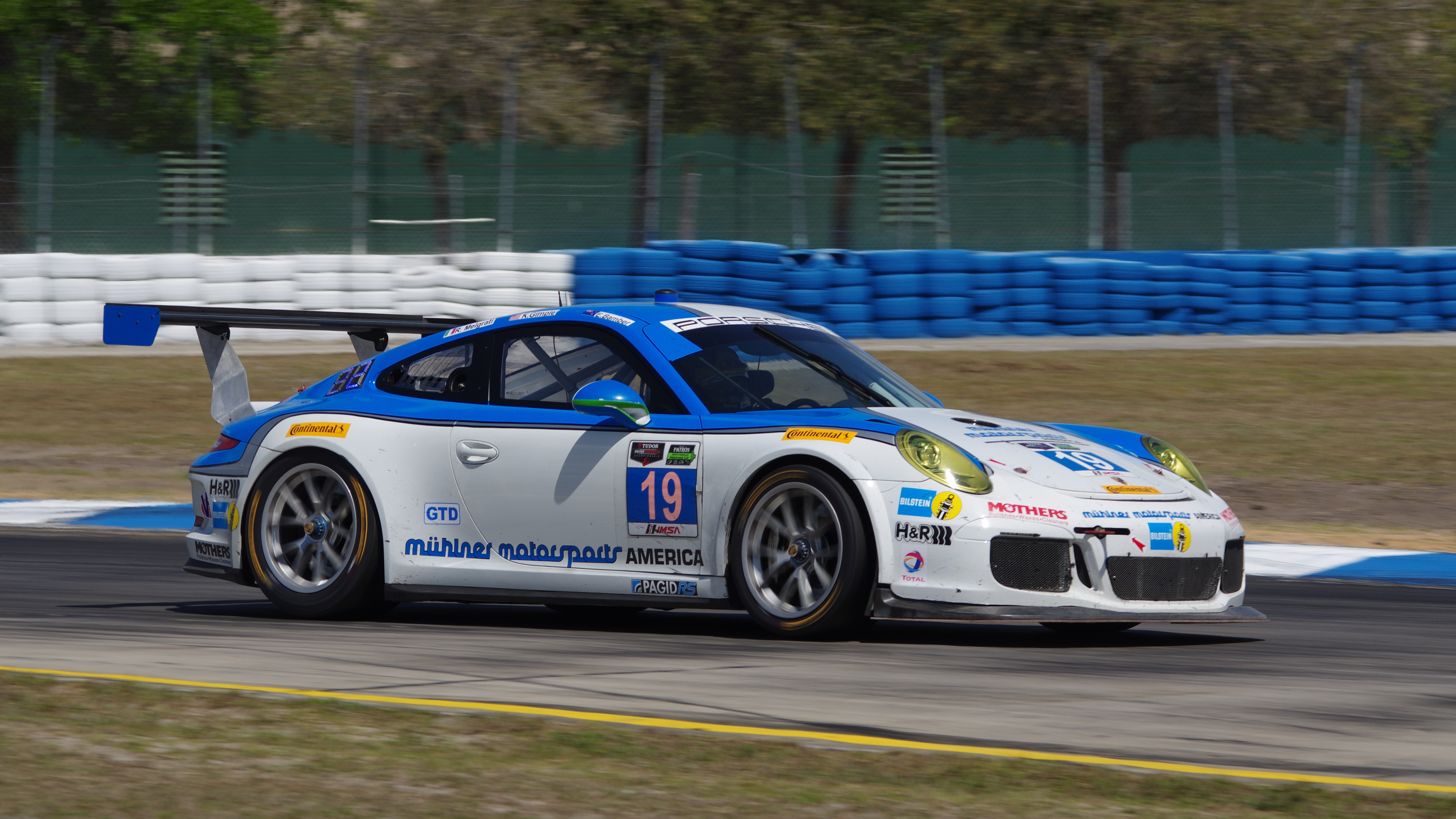
Bamber racing at the Sebring International Raceway during the 2014 GT America Series.

Bamber raced with FACH Auto Tech in the Porsche Supercup alongside Porsche Carrera Cups of Germany and Asia with Team 75 Bernhard and LKM Racing, respectively. After ten rounds in the Supercup, Bamber won the drivers championship with 155 points, ahead of Kuba Giermaziak on 132 points, becoming the first New Zealander to win the Porsche Supercup title and the first rookie to do so. After seven of the ten races, the FACH Auto Tech driver had already won the rookie classification. He dominated the Porsche Carrera Cup Asia season on his way to retaining the title as he won eight out of the ten races that he competed in despite missing two races in Zhuhai due to his concurrent commitments in Porsche Supercup and Porsche Carrera Cup Germany. With the support of Team 75 Bernhard, Bamber competed in ten out of eighteen rounds of the Porsche Carrera Cup Germany with two wins, five podiums and three fastest laps. He left the series holding second position in the Drivers Championship and was seventh overall at the end of the season. Bamber also replaced the injured Richard Lietz in the Porsche 911 RSR at the Petit Le Mans in the United SportsCar Championship, joining Porsche works drivers Patrick Long and Michael Christensen. Their second place ensured team Porsche North America, run by Core Autosport, won the manufacturers title in the championship.

==== 2015 ====
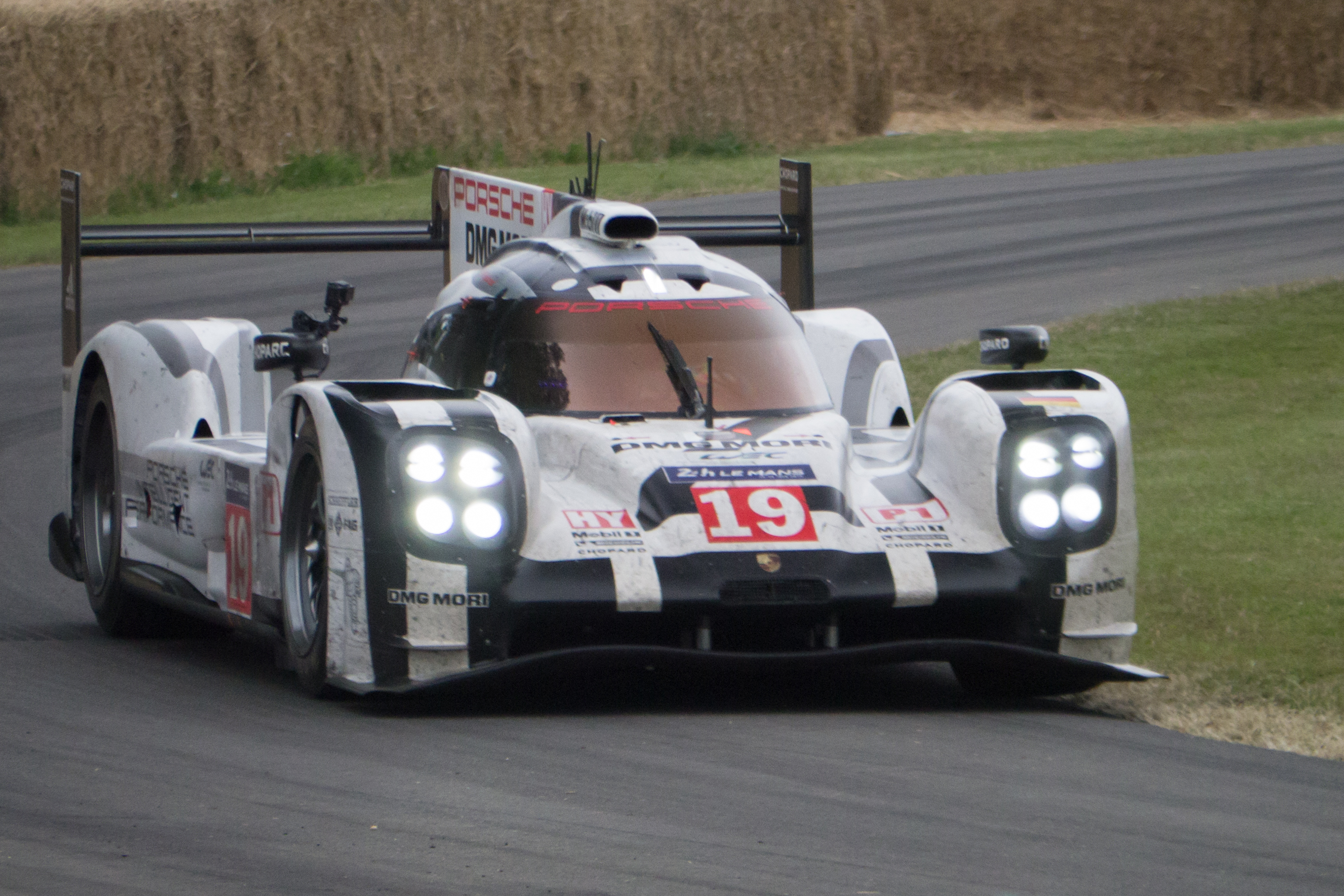
The #19 Porsche 919 Hybrid Bamber co-drove with Hülkenberg and Tandy to win the 2015 24 Hours of Le Mans

Prior to the 2015 season, Bamber signed with Porsche Motorsport as a works driver. In January 2015, he and fellow works drivers Jörg Bergmeister and Frédéric Makowiecki took the No.912 Porsche 911 RSR to seventh place at the 24 Hours of Daytona. Bamber and Nick Tandy joined Formula One driver Nico Hülkenberg in the Porsche LMP squad to contest the 6 Hours of Spa-Francorchamps and the Le Mans 24 Hours in a 919 Hybrid. Bamber's hybrid, car No. 19, was third on the grid after Porsche finished first, second and third in qualifying, but ended up winning comfortably. Bamber's childhood friend and Porsche teammate, Brendon Hartley, with co-drivers Mark Webber and Timo Bernhard, started from second on the grid in a 919 Hybrid and finished the race in second place. Bamber claimed his first career GT Le Mans (GTLM) pole at the Continental Tire Road Race Showcase at Road America in his first qualifying attempt as a Porsche factory driver on August 8. He bettered the previous lap record by more than a full second. He also made a guest appearance in the FIA World Endurance Championship's 6 Hours of Nürburgring, filling in for Klaus Bachler in the No. 88 Abu Dhabi-Proton Racing Porsche 911 RSR. Bamber made his debut in the FIA GT World Cup in the streets of Macau in November. The versatility in going between LMP1, GTE-Pro (GT Le Mans in IMSA) and GTE-Am this year, he said, made him a better driver.

==== 2016 ====
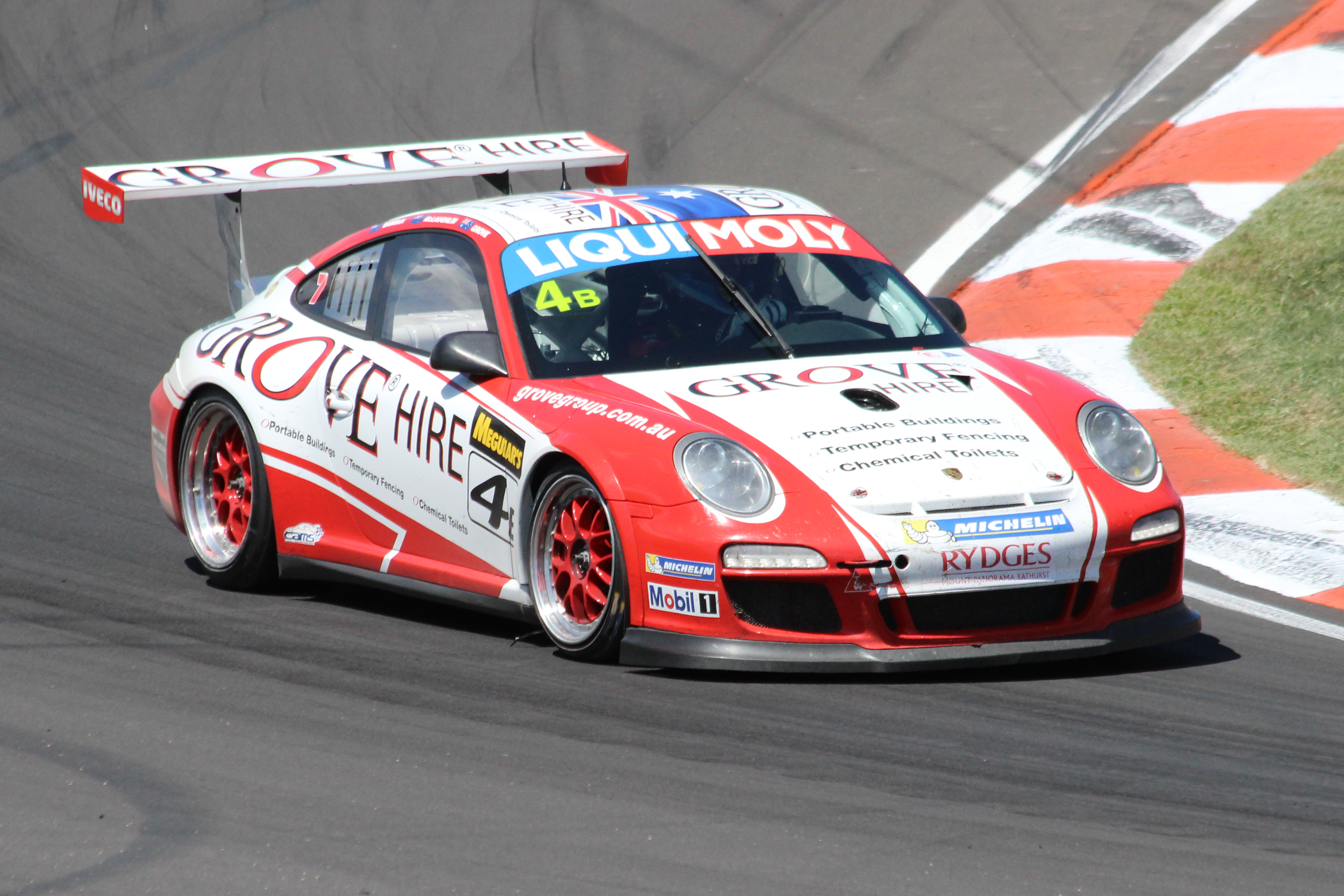
The Class B-winning Porsche GT3 Cup of Earl Bamber, Stephen Grove and Scott McLaughlin at the 2016 Liqui Moly Bathurst 12 Hour

In 2016, Bamber continued to pilot the 911 RSR for Porsche North America and Porsche Motorsport in the IMSA WeatherTech Sportscar Championship and the 24 Hours of Le Mans in the World Endurance Championship, respectively. Bamber was the highest placed Kiwi driver at the 54th running of the Rolex 24 Hours of Daytona when his Porsche 911 RSR team came home third in the GTLM class and placed ninth overall. Bamber made a successful return at the Bathurst 12 Hour with a second Class B victory for Grove Motorsport in as many races at the endurance classic in Mount Panorama, Australia alongside team owner Stephen Grove and V8 Supercars driver Scott McLaughlin. In changing weather conditions at the 12 Hours of Sebring, Bamber and his teammates in the No. 912 Porsche 911 RSR finished third.

==== 2017 ====
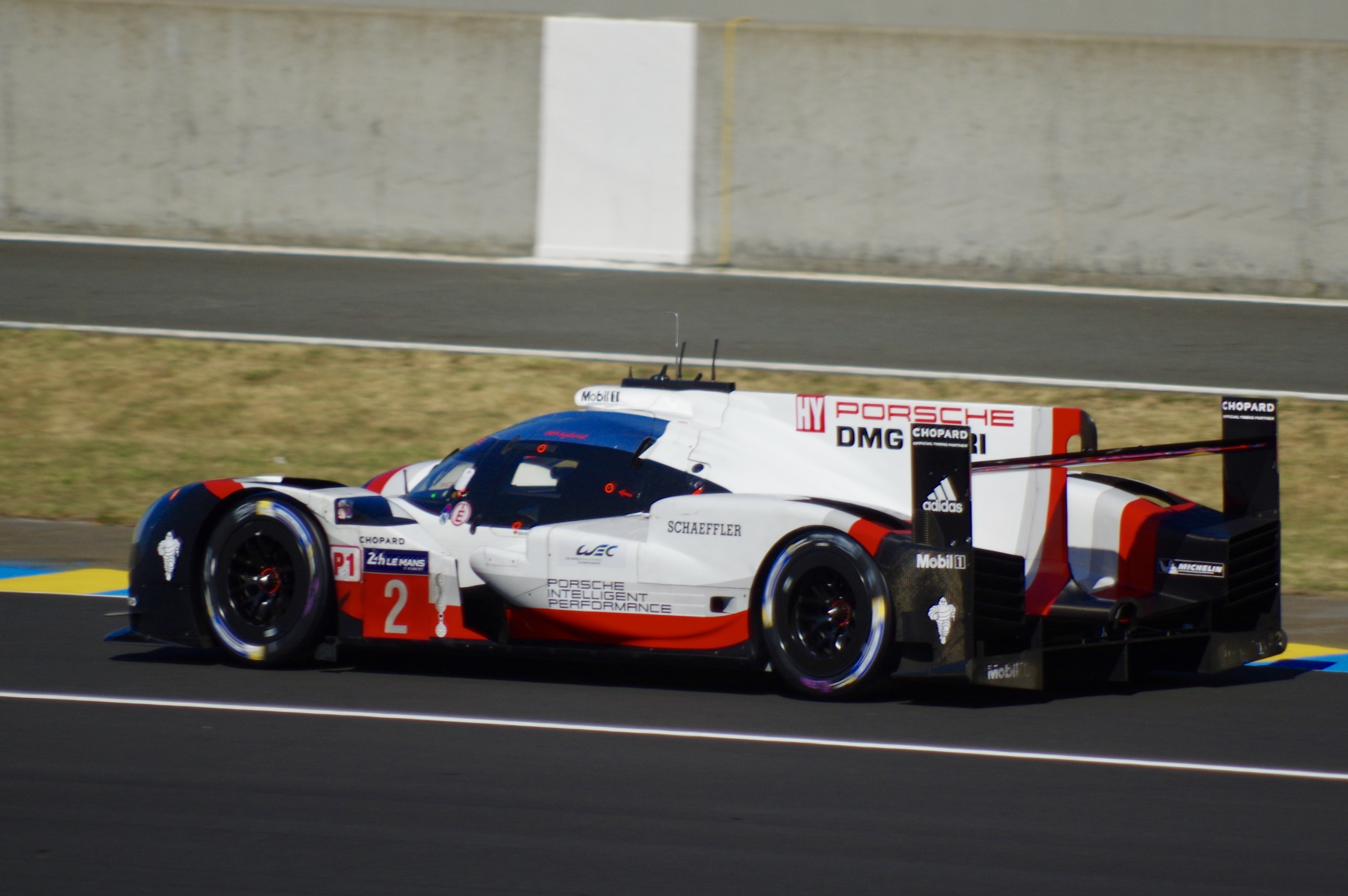
The 2017 24 Hours of Le Mans race-winning No. 2 Porsche 919 Hybrid of Timo Bernhard, Brendon Hartley and Earl Bamber

On 3 December 2016, Bamber was confirmed as a member of the Porsche LMP1 team with Nick Tandy and André Lotterer to contest 2017 FIA World Endurance Championship. He co-drove the No. 2 car with Timo Bernhard and Brendon Hartley, replacing the retired Mark Webber.

==== Hypercar racing ====
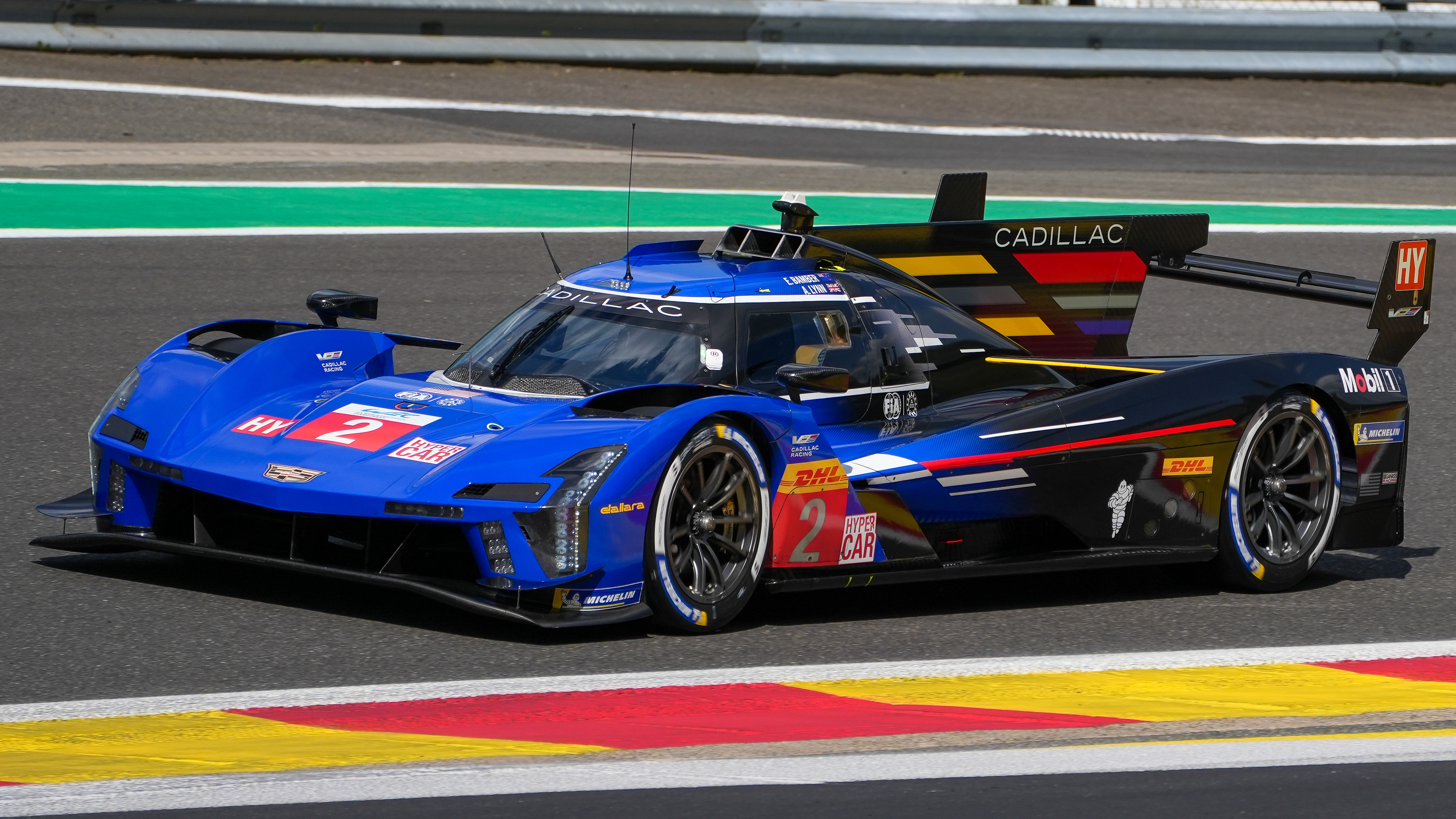
The No. 2 V-Series.R belonging to Bamber and Lynn at the 2024 6 Hours of Spa-Francorchamps

For the 2023 season, Bamber would join Alex Lynn and Richard Westbrook in the Hypercar category of the World Endurance Championship, piloting a Cadillac V-Series.R ran by Chip Ganassi Racing.

=== Other racing ===
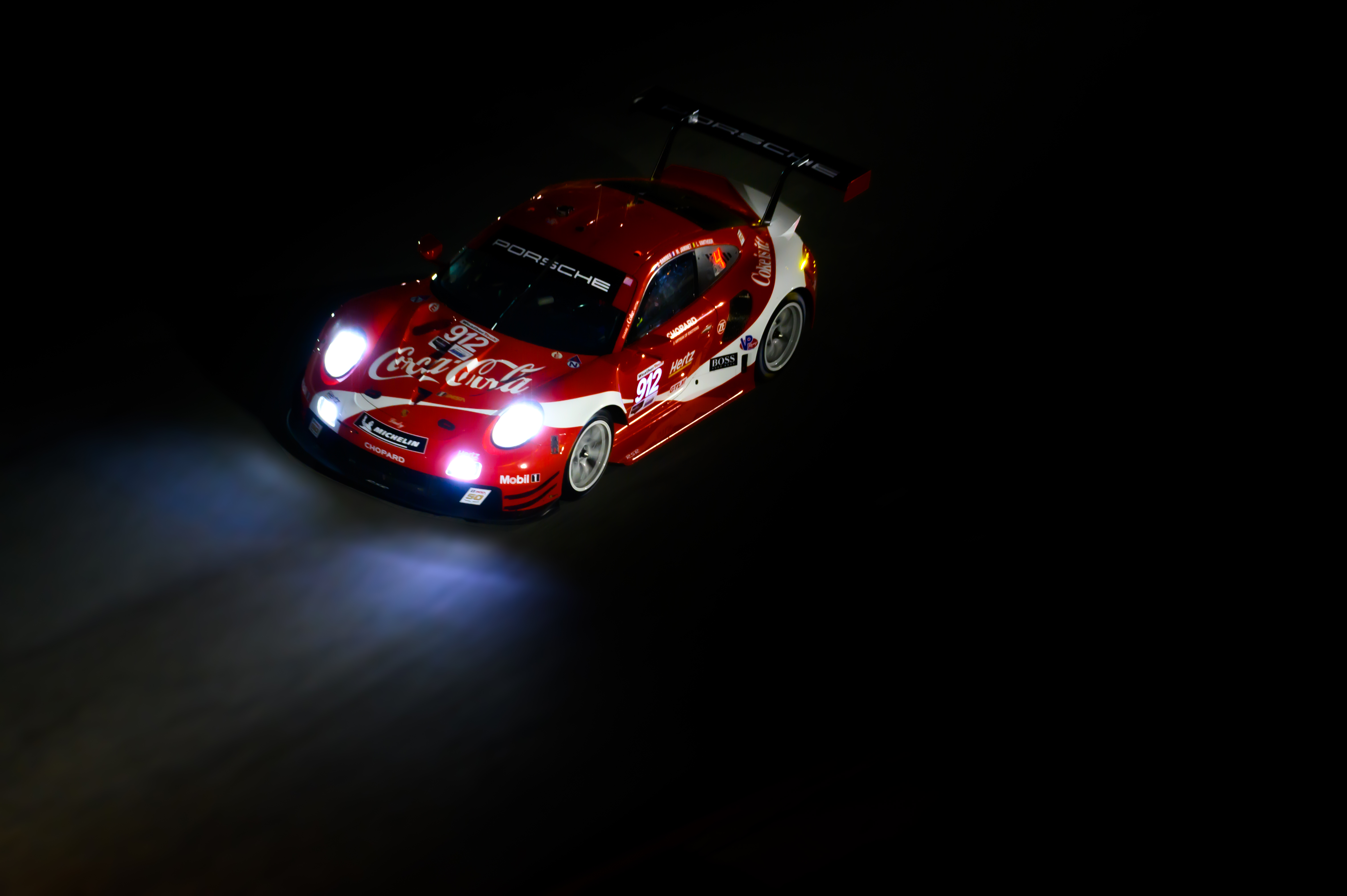
The Porsche 911 RSR of Earl Bamber, Laurens Vanthoor and Mathieu Jaminet at the 2019 Petit Le Mans

In August 2020, Bamber joined NASCAR team Richard Childress Racing for the Xfinity Series race on the Daytona road course. Bamber had become associated with team owner Richard Childress via his father, who was hunting partners with Childress in the 2000s; Bamber and RCR attempted to work a three-race deal after Bamber participated in oval racing with RCR driver Ty Dillon, but it failed to materialise. Bamber started 29th in the UNOH 188 but finished 33rd after hitting a kerb on the backstretch chicane, which caused his car to go airborne.

== Helmets ==
Bamber uses helmets designed by Italian manufacturers Stilo. He acknowledges his home country with a silver fern design on the sides of his Stilo ST5 helmets, a quasi-national emblem used for various official symbols, including the Coat of arms of New Zealand and the New Zealand one dollar coin. On top are four red stars with white borders representing the Southern Cross which features on the Flag of New Zealand. He has the number 19 painted on the back of one of his helmets, the same number as on his Porsche 919 Hybrid.

== Motorsports career results ==
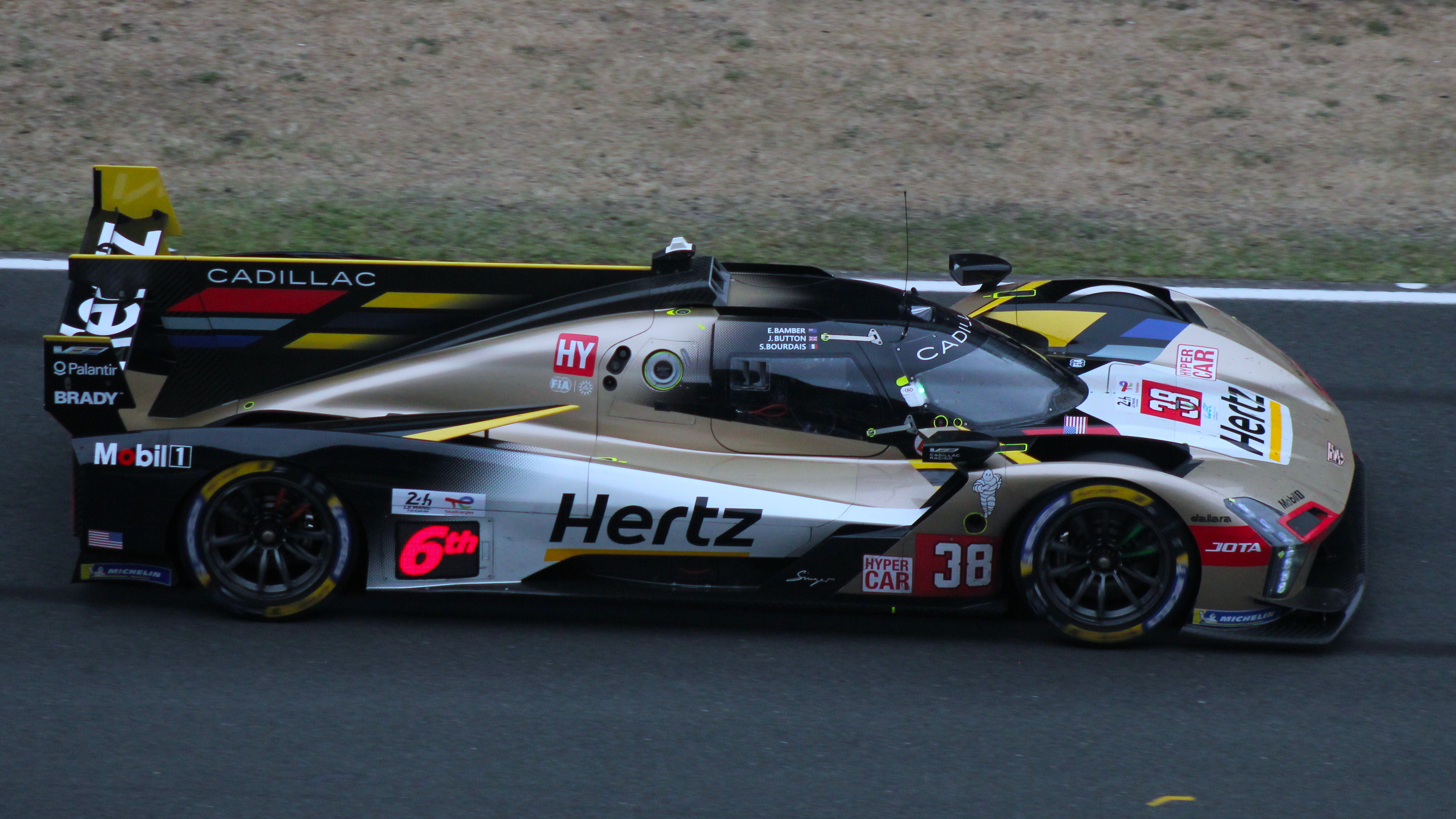
Bamber's No. 38 car at the 2025 24 Hours of Le Mans

=== Racing career summary ===
Season	Series	Team	Races	Wins	Poles	FLaps	Podiums	Points	Position
2005–06	New Zealand Formula Ford Championship	Powerbuilt Racing Team	?	?	?	?	?	883	4th
2006	Formula BMW Asia	Team Meritus	19	10	9	5	14	290	**1st**
2006–07	Toyota Racing Series	Team Meritus	19	0	0	0	3	600	7th
2007	Formula Renault V6 Asia Championship	Team Meritus	8	0	1	0	1	31	10th
2007–08	Toyota Racing Series	International Motorsport	23	10	3	8	17	1207	**2nd**
2008	Formula V6 Asia	Team Meritus	8	5	2	6	7	105	**2nd**
2008	International Formula Master	ADM Motorsport	2	1	0	0	1	12	15th
2008	Australian Drivers' Championship	Team BRM	3	0	0	0	1	23	13th
2008–09	A1 Grand Prix	A1 Team New Zealand	10	0	0	0	3	36‡	7th‡
2008–09	Toyota Racing Series	Earl Bamber Racing	3	1	0	2	3	209	12th
2008–09	GP2 Asia Series	My Team Qi-Meritus Mahara	5	0	0	0	1	8	14th
2009	International Formula Master	ADM Motorsport	6	0	0	0	0	2	18th
2009	Euroseries 3000	TP Formula	2	0	0	0	0	8	11th
2010	Toyota Racing Series	Triple X Motorsport	15	6	2	4	9	912	**2nd**
2010	Superleague Formula	F.C. Porto	3	1	0	0	2	495‡	7th‡
2010	Superleague Formula	PSV Eindhoven	2	0	0	0	1	288‡	16th‡
2010–11	Porsche GT3 Cup Challenge New Zealand	Triple X Motorsport	3	0	0	0	2	169	15th
2011	Toyota Racing Series	M2 Competition	6	0	0	0	0	164	15th
2011	Superleague Formula	Team New Zealand	2	0	0	0	0	113‡	7th‡
2012	JK Racing Asia Series	Meritus.GP	4	0	0	0	0	0	NC†
2013	Porsche Carrera Cup Asia	Nexus Racing	12	6	5	6	11	217	**1st**
2013	Porsche Carrera Cup Australia	Grove Group	2	0	0	0	0	0	NC
2013	Porsche Supercup	Fach Auto Tech	3	0	1	1	1	0	NC†
2013	Audi R8 LMS Cup China	Audi Hong Kong Team	3	1	2	3	2	27	12th
2013	GT Asia Series - GT3	LKM Racing	1	0	0	0	0	0	NC
2014	Porsche Supercup	Fach Auto Tech	10	2	2	2	7	155	**1st**
2014	Porsche Carrera Cup Asia	LKM Racing	10	8	6	5	10	199	**1st**
2014	GT Asia Series - GT3	LKM Racing	3	0	0	0	0	0	NC
2014	Porsche Carrera Cup Germany	Team 75 Bernhard	10	2	0	3	5	126	7th
2014	United SportsCar Championship - GTD	Mühlner Motorsports America	2	0	0	0	0	15	102nd
2014	United SportsCar Championship - GTLM	Porsche North America	1	0	0	0	1	33	29th
2014	Bathurst 12 Hour - Class B	Grove Motorsport	1	1	1	0	1	N/A	**1st**
2015	FIA World Endurance Championship	Porsche Team	2	1	0	0	1	58	9th
2015	FIA World Endurance Championship - LMGTE Am	Abu Dhabi-Proton Racing	3	0	0	2	1	36	13th
2015	24 Hours of Le Mans	Porsche Team	1	1	0	0	1	N/A	**1st**
2015	United SportsCar Championship - GTLM	Porsche North America	8	0	2	0	3	220	10th
2015	FIA GT World Cup	LKM Racing	1	0	0	0	0	N/A	DNF
2016	IMSA SportsCar Championship - GTLM	Porsche North America	10	1	0	0	5	313	4th
2016	Porsche Carrera Cup Asia	Team Carrera Cup Asia	1	1	1	1	1	0	NC†
2016	24 Hours of Le Mans - LMGTE Pro	Porsche Motorsport	1	0	0	0	0	N/A	DNF
2016	24 Hours of Nürburgring - SP9	Manthey Racing	1	0	0	0	0	N/A	DNF
2016	FIA GT World Cup	Manthey Racing	1	0	0	0	1	N/A	4th
2016	Sepang 12 Hours - GT3 Pro	Manthey Racing	1	0	0	1	1	N/A	**2nd**
2016	Bathurst 12 Hour - Class B	Grove Motorsport	1	1	1	0	1	N/A	**1st**
2017	FIA World Endurance Championship	Porsche LMP Team	9	4	1	3	8	208	**1st**
2017	24 Hours of Le Mans	Porsche LMP Team	1	1	0	0	1	N/A	**1st**
2017	IMSA SportsCar Championship - GTLM	Porsche GT Team	1	0	0	0	0	26	24th
2017	Blancpain GT Series Asia - GT3	Arrows Racing	2	0	0	0	0	0	NC†
2017	Intercontinental GT Challenge	Walkinshaw GT3	1	0	0	0	0	0	NC
2018	IMSA SportsCar Championship - GTLM	Porsche GT Team	11	1	0	1	4	308	5th
2018	Intercontinental GT Challenge	Craft-Bamboo Racing	1	0	0	0	0	10	20th
2018	Intercontinental GT Challenge	KÜS Team75 Bernhard	1	0	0	0	0	10	20th
2018	Intercontinental GT Challenge	D'station Racing	1	0	0	0	0	10	20th
2018	Supercars Championship	Triple Eight Race Engineering	4	0	0	0	1	576	29th
2018	Super2 Series	Grove Racing	1	0	0	0	0	156	24th
2018	Blancpain GT Series Endurance Cup	KÜS Team75 Bernhard	1	0	0	0	0	3	43rd
2018	Porsche Carrera Cup Australia	Grove Motorsport	3	0	0	1	3	102	25th
2018	24 Hours of Le Mans - LMGTE Pro	Porsche GT Team	1	0	0	0	0	N/A	10th
2018	24 Hours of Nürburgring - SP9	Manthey Racing	1	0	0	0	0	N/A	DNF
2018	FIA GT World Cup	Manthey Racing	1	0	0	0	0	N/A	4th
2019	IMSA SportsCar Championship - GTLM	Porsche GT Team	11	3	0	2	7	330	**1st**
2019	Intercontinental GT Challenge	KÜS Team75 Bernhard	1	0	0	0	0	10	25th
2019	Intercontinental GT Challenge	Dinamic Motorsport	1	0	0	0	0	10	25th
2019	Blancpain GT Series Endurance Cup	KÜS Team75 Bernhard	1	0	0	0	0	2	33rd
2019	24 Hours of Nürburgring - SP9 Pro	Manthey Racing	1	0	0	0	0	N/A	DSQ
2019	FIA GT World Cup	ROWE Racing	1	0	0	0	1	N/A	**3rd**
2020	IMSA SportsCar Championship - GTLM	Porsche GT Team	10	2	0	0	5	289	6th
2020	Intercontinental GT Challenge	Earl Bamber Motorsport	1	0	0	0	0	37	**3rd**
2020	Intercontinental GT Challenge	ROWE Racing	1	1	0	0	1	37	**3rd**
2020	Intercontinental GT Challenge	Dinamic Motorsport	1	0	0	0	0	37	**3rd**
2020	GT World Challenge Europe Endurance Cup	ROWE Racing	1	1	0	0	1	33	10th
2020	NASCAR Xfinity Series	Richard Childress Racing	1	0	0	0	0	14	62nd
2020	24 Hours of Nürburgring - SP9 Pro	KCMG	1	0	0	0	0	N/A	13th
2021	GT World Challenge Europe Endurance Cup	GPX Martini Racing	5	1	0	0	1	35	10th
2021	Intercontinental GT Challenge	GPX Martini Racing	1	0	0	0	0	0	NC
2021	IMSA SportsCar Championship - GTD	Team Hardpoint EBM	2	0	0	0	0	462	41st
2021	IMSA SportsCar Championship - DPi	Cadillac Chip Ganassi Racing	1	0	0	0	0	284	20th
2021	Thailand Super Series - Supercar GT3	EBM Singha Motorsport	5	1	0	0	5	97	**1st**
2021	24 Hours of Le Mans - GTE Pro	WeatherTech Racing	1	0	0	0	0	N/A	DNF
2021	24 Hours of Nürburgring - SP9 Pro	Frikadelli Racing Team	1	0	0	0	0	N/A	DNF
2022	IMSA SportsCar Championship - DPi	Cadillac Racing	11	1	0	2	4	3191	4th
2022	GT World Challenge Asia - GT3	EBM Giga Racing	2	1	1	0	2	43	11th
2022	GT World Challenge Europe Endurance Cup	Singha Racing Team TP12	1	0	0	0	0	0	NC
2022	GT World Challenge Europe Endurance Cup - Gold Cup	Singha Racing Team TP12	1	0	0	0	1	27	11th
2022	Intercontinental GT Challenge	Singha Racing Team TP12	1	0	0	0	0	0	NC
2022	International GT Open	Singha Racing Team TP12	1	0	0	0	0	0	33rd
2022	Thailand Super Series - Supercar GT3	Toyota Gazoo Racing Team Thailand	2	0	0	0	0	0	17th
2022	24 Hours of Nürburgring - SP9 Pro	KCMG	1	0	0	0	0	N/A	DNF
2022–23	Middle East Trophy - GT3	EBM – Grove Racing							
2023	FIA World Endurance Championship - Hypercar	Cadillac Racing	7	0	0	0	1	72	5th
2023	24 Hours of Le Mans - Hypercar	Cadillac Racing	1	0	0	0	1	N/A	**3rd**
2023	IMSA SportsCar Championship - GTP	Cadillac Racing	1	0	0	0	0	306	21st
2023	Intercontinental GT Challenge	Grove Racing	3	0	0	0	0	15	22nd
2023	GT World Challenge Europe Endurance Cup	Grove Racing	1	0	0	0	0	0	NC
2023	GT World Challenge Europe Endurance Cup - Bronze Cup	Grove Racing	1	0	0	0	0	4	32nd
2023	GT World Challenge America - Pro-Am	Grove Racing	1	0	0	0	0	0	NC
2023	GT World Challenge Asia - GT3	EBM Giga Racing	2	0	0	0	0	0	NC
2023	24H GT Series - GT3	Grove Racing	1	0	0	0	0	0	NC
2023	24 Hours of Nürburgring - SP9 Pro	Frikadelli Racing Team	1	1	0	0	1	N/A	**1st**
2023–24	Asian Le Mans Series - GT	Earl Bamber Motorsport	5	0	0	0	0	0	31st
2024	FIA World Endurance Championship - Hypercar	Cadillac Racing	8	0	1	0	0	38	15th
2024	IMSA SportsCar Championship - GTD Pro	Corvette Racing by Pratt Miller Motorsports	3	0	0	0	0	695	25th
2024	GT World Challenge Europe Endurance Cup	Earl Bamber Motorsport	1	0	0	0	0	0	NC
2024	24H Series - GT3	Prime Speed Sport							
2025	FIA World Endurance Championship – Hypercar	Cadillac Hertz Team Jota	8	0	0	0	1	46	10th
2025	IMSA SportsCar Championship - GTP	Cadillac Whelen	8	2	1	2	2	2448	9th
2025	Middle East Trophy - GT3	Earl Bamber Motorsport							
2026	IMSA SportsCar Championship - GTP	Cadillac Whelen	8	2	3	3	6	2672	5th
2026	Mazda MX-5 Cup	Hendricks Motorsports							
2026	FIA World Endurance Championship - Hypercar	Cadillac Hertz Team Jota	8	1	0	0	2	81	4th
2026	Intercontinental GT Challenge	Johor Motorsports JMR	1	0	0	0	0	0	NC
2026	24 Hours of Lemons Rookie, A-Class - Mid-West Crisis	Misfortune Cookie	1	0	0	0	0	0	80th
2026	FIA GT World Cup	Audi Sport Asia Team Absolute							

^{*} Season still in progress.
^{‡} Team standings. |}

=== Complete A1 Grand Prix results ===
(key) (Races in bold indicate pole position) (Races in italics indicate fastest lap)

Year	Entrant	1	2	3	4	5	6	7	8	9	10	11	12	13	14	15	16	17	18	19	20	DC	Points
2007–08	New Zealand	NED; SPR	NED; FEA	CZE; SPR	CZE; FEA	MYS; SPR	MYS; FEA	CHN; SPR; PO	CHN; FEA; PO	NZL; SPR	NZL; FEA	AUS; SPR; PO	AUS; FEA; PO	RSA; SPR	RSA; FEA	MEX; SPR	MEX; FEA	CHN; SPR	CHN; FEA	GBR; SPR	GBR; FEA	2nd	93
2008–09	New Zealand	NED; SPR; 2	NED; FEA; 3	CHN; SPR	CHN; FEA	MYS; SPR; 3	MYS; FEA; 6	NZL; SPR	NZL; FEA	RSA; SPR; 8	RSA; FEA; Ret	POR; SPR; Ret	POR; FEA; Ret	GBR; SPR; Ret	GBR; FEA; Ret							7th	36

=== Complete GP2 Asia Series results ===
(key) (Races in bold indicate pole position) (Races in italics indicate fastest lap)

Year	Entrant	1	2	3	4	5	6	7	8	9	10	11	12	DC	Points
2008–09	Qi-Meritus Mahara	CHN; FEA; 6	CHN; SPR; 2	UAE; FEA; Ret	UAE; SPR; C	BHR; FEA; 11	BHR; SPR; 7	QAT; FEA	QAT; SPR	MAL; FEA	MAL; SPR	BHR; FEA	BHR; SPR	14th	8

=== Complete Porsche Carrera Cup Asia results ===
(key) (Races in bold indicate pole position) (Races in italics indicate fastest lap)

Year	Team	1	2	3	4	5	6	7	8	9	10	11	12	DC	Points
2013	Nexus Racing	SEP; 3	SHG; 2	SHG; 2	ZIC; 1	ZIC; 1	**ORD**; 1	**ORD**; 1	**INJ**; 10	INJ; 3	**SIN**; 1	**SHG**; 1	SHG; 2	**1st**	**217**
2014	LKM Racing	**SEP**; 1	**SHG**; 1	SHG; 3	ZIC	ZIC	**FUJ**; 1	**FUJ**; 1	SEP; 1	SEP; 2	SIN; 1	**SHG**; 1	**SHG**; 1	**1st**	**199**

=== Complete Porsche Carrera Cup Germany results ===
(key) (Races in bold indicate pole position) (Races in italics indicate fastest lap)

Year	Team	1	2	3	4	5	6	7	8	9	10	11	12	13	14	15	16	17	18	DC	Points
2014	Team 75 Bernhard	HOC; 3	HOC; 1	OSC; Ret	OSC; 5	HUN; 5	HUN; 17	NOR; 5	NOR; 2	RBR; 2	RBR; 1	NÜR	NÜR	LAU	LAU	SAC	SAC	HOC	HOC	**7th**	**126**

=== Complete Porsche Supercup results ===
(key) (Races in bold indicate pole position) (Races in italics indicate fastest lap)

Year	Team	1	2	3	4	5	6	7	8	9	10	Pos.	Pts
2013	FACH Auto Tech	ESP	MON	GBR	GER	HUN; 15	BEL	ITA	**UAE**; 2	UAE; 5		NC	0
2014	FACH Auto Tech	ESP; 1	MON; 9	AUT; 6	GBR; 3	GER; 2	HUN; 3	**BEL**; 1	ITA; 3	USA; 4	**USA**; 2	1st	155

=== Complete Bathurst 12 Hour results ===
Year	Team	Co-drivers	Car	Class	Laps	Pos.	Class pos.
2014	(Australia) Grove Group	(Australia) Stephen Grove (United Kingdom) Ben Barker	Porsche 911 GT3 Cup	Class B	286	8th	**1st**
2016	(Australia) Grove Hire	(Australia) Stephen Grove (New Zealand) Scott McLaughlin	Porsche 911 GT3 Cup	Class B	285	12th	**1st**
2017	(Australia) Walkinshaw GT3	(France) Kévin Estre (Belgium) Laurens Vanthoor	Porsche 911 GT3 R	Class APP	44	DNF	DNF
2018	(Hong Kong) Craft-Bamboo Racing	(France) Kévin Estre (Belgium) Laurens Vanthoor	Porsche 911 GT3 R	Class APP	271	5th	**3rd**

=== Complete 24 Hours of Le Mans results ===
Year	Team	Co-drivers	Car	Class	Laps	Pos.	Class pos.
2015	(Germany) Porsche Team	(Germany) Nico Hülkenberg (United Kingdom) Nick Tandy	Porsche 919 Hybrid	LMP1	395	**1st**	**1st**
2016	(Germany) Porsche Motorsport	(Germany) Jörg Bergmeister (France) Frédéric Makowiecki	Porsche 911 RSR	GTE; Pro	140	DNF	DNF
2017	(Germany) Porsche Team	(Germany) Timo Bernhard (New Zealand) Brendon Hartley	Porsche 919 Hybrid	LMP1	367	**1st**	**1st**
2018	(United States) Porsche GT Team	(France) Patrick Pilet (United Kingdom) Nick Tandy	Porsche 911 RSR	GTE; Pro	334	27th	10th
2019	(United States) Porsche GT Team	(France) Patrick Pilet (United Kingdom) Nick Tandy	Porsche 911 RSR	GTE; Pro	342	22nd	**3rd**
2021	(United States) WeatherTech Racing	(Belgium) Laurens Vanthoor (United States) Cooper MacNeil	Porsche 911 RSR-19	GTE; Pro	139	DNF	DNF
2023	(United States) Cadillac Racing	(United Kingdom) Alex Lynn (United Kingdom) Richard Westbrook	Cadillac V-Series.R	Hypercar	341	**3rd**	**3rd**
2024	(United States) Cadillac Racing	(United Kingdom) Alex Lynn (Spain) Álex Palou	Cadillac V-Series.R	Hypercar	311	7th	7th
2025	(United States) Cadillac Hertz Team Jota	(France) Sébastien Bourdais (United Kingdom) Jenson Button	Cadillac V-Series.R	Hypercar	386	7th	7th
2026	(United States) Cadillac Hertz Team Jota	(United Kingdom) Jack Aitken (France) Sébastien Bourdais	Cadillac V-Series.R	Hypercar	218	DNF	DNF

=== Complete 24 Hours of Nürburgring results ===
Year	Team	Co-drivers	Car	Class	Laps	Pos.	Class pos.
2016	(Germany) Manthey Racing	(United Kingdom) Nick Tandy (France) Kévin Estre (France) Patrick Pilet	Porsche 911 GT3 R	SP9	1	DNF	DNF
2018	(Germany) Manthey Racing	(France) Romain Dumas (France) Kévin Estre (Belgium) Laurens Vanthoor	Porsche 911 GT3 R	SP9	66	DNF	DNF
2019	(Germany) Manthey Racing	(Denmark) Michael Christensen (France) Kévin Estre (Belgium) Laurens Vanthoor	Porsche 911 GT3 R	SP9 Pro	156	DSQ	DSQ
2020	(Hong Kong) KCMG	(Germany) Jörg Bergmeister (Germany) Timo Bernhard (Norway) Dennis Olsen	Porsche 911 GT3 R	SP9 Pro	83	13th	13th
2021	(Germany) Frikadelli Racing Team	(Australia) Matt Campbell (France) Mathieu Jaminet (United Kingdom) Nick Tandy	Porsche 911 GT3 R	SP9 Pro	26	DNF	DNF
2022	(Hong Kong) KCMG	(Norway) Dennis Olsen (United Kingdom) Nick Tandy	Porsche 911 GT3 R	SP9 Pro	149	DNF	DNF
2023	(Germany) Frikadelli Racing Team	(Netherlands) Nicky Catsburg (Germany) Felipe Fernández Laser (United Kingdom) David Pittard	Ferrari 296 GT3	SP9 Pro	162	**1st**	**1st**

=== Complete 24 Hours of Spa results ===
Year	Team	Co-drivers	Car	Class	Laps	Pos.	Class pos.
2018	(Germany) KÜS Team75 Bernhard	(Germany) Timo Bernhard (Belgium) Laurens Vanthoor	Porsche 911 GT3 R	Pro	353	DNF	DNF
2019	(Germany) KÜS Team75 Bernhard	(Germany) Timo Bernhard (Belgium) Laurens Vanthoor	Porsche 911 GT3 R	Pro	362	9th	9th
2020	(Germany) Rowe Racing	(United Kingdom) Nick Tandy (Belgium) Laurens Vanthoor	Porsche 911 GT3 R	Pro	527	**1st**	**1st**
2021	(United Arab Emirates) GPX Martini Racing	(Australia) Matt Campbell (France) Mathieu Jaminet	Porsche 911 GT3 R	Pro	246	NC	NC
2022	(Thailand) Singha Racing Team TP 12	(Thailand) Piti Bhirombhakdi (France) Christophe Hamon (Thailand) Tanart Sathienthirakul	Porsche 911 GT3 R	Pro-Am	526	30th	**3rd**
2023	(Australia) Grove Racing	(Australia) Brenton Grove (Australia) Stephen Grove (Australia) Anton de Pasquale	Porsche 911 GT3 R (992)	Bronze	440	45th	13th
2024	(New Zealand) Earl Bamber Motorsport	(Malaysia) Adrian D'Silva (New Zealand) Brendon Leitch (China) Kerong Li	Porsche 911 GT3 R (992)	Pro-Am	76	DNF	DNF

=== Complete FIA World Endurance Championship results ===
Year	Entrant	Class	Chassis	Engine	1	2	3	4	5	6	7	8	9	Rank	Points
2015	Porsche Team	LMP1	Porsche 919 Hybrid	Porsche 2.0 L Turbo V4 (Hybrid)	SIL	SPA; 6	LMS; 1							9th	58
2015	Abu Dhabi-Proton Racing	LMGTE Am	Porsche 911 RSR	Porsche 4.0 L Flat-6				NÜR; 6	COA; 2	FUJ; 5	SHA	BHR		13th	36
2017	Porsche LMP Team	LMP1	Porsche 919 Hybrid	Porsche 2.0 L Turbo V4 (Hybrid)	SIL; 2	SPA; 3	LMS; 1	NÜR; 1	**MEX**; 1	COA; 1	**FUJ**; 4	SHA; 2	BHR; 2	1st	208
2023	Cadillac Racing	Hypercar	Cadillac V-LMDh	Cadillac LMC55R 5.5 L V8	SEB; 4	ALG; 4	SPA; 5	LMS; 3	MNZ; 10	FUJ; 10	BHR; 11			5th	72
2024	Cadillac Racing	Hypercar	Cadillac V-Series.R	Cadillac LMC55R 5.5 L V8	QAT; DSQ	IMO; 10	SPA; Ret	LMS; 7	SÃO; 13	COA; 4	**FUJ**; Ret	BHR; 6		15th	38
2025	Cadillac Hertz Team Jota	Hypercar	Cadillac V-Series.R	Cadillac LMC55R 5.5 L V8	QAT; 16	IMO; 16	SPA; 6	LMS; 7	SÃO; 2	COA; 6	FUJ; 13	BHR; 16		10th	46
2026	Cadillac Hertz Team Jota	Hypercar	Cadillac V-Series.R	Cadillac LMC55R 5.5 L V8	IMO; 8	SPA; Ret	LMS; Ret	SÃO; 4	COA; 2	FUJ; 5	CAT; 4	MNZ; 1		4th	81

=== Complete IMSA SportsCar Championship results ===
(key) (Races in bold indicate pole position) (Races in italics indicate fastest lap)

Year	Team	No.	Class	Car	Engine	1	2	3	4	5	6	7	8	9	10	11	12	Rank	Points	Ref
2014	Mühlner Motorsports America	18	GTD	Porsche 911 GT America	Porsche 4.0 L Flat-6	DAY; 27	SEB; 20		LGA	DET	WGL	MOS	IMS	ELK	VIR	COA		79th	27	
2014	Porsche North America	912	GTLM	Porsche 911 RSR	Porsche 4.0 L Flat-6			LBH									PET; 2	29th	33	
2015	Porsche North America	912	GTLM	Porsche 911 RSR	Porsche 4.0 L Flat-6	DAY; 7	SEB; 7	LBH	LGA	WGL; 2	MOS; 7	LIM	**ELK**; 2	VIR; 2	COA; 5	**PET**; 8		10th	225	
2016	Porsche North America	912	GTLM	Porsche 911 RSR	Porsche 4.0 L Flat-6	DAY; 3	SEB; 3	LBH; 7	LGA; 3	WGL; 10	MOS; 6	LIM; 8	ELK; 4	VIR; 3	COA; 1	PET; 5		4th	313	
2017	Porsche GT Team	912	GTLM	Porsche 911 RSR	Porsche 4.0 L Flat-6	DAY	SEB	LBH	COA	WGL	MOS	LIM	ELK	VIR	LGA	PET; 5		24th	26	
2018	Porsche GT Team	912	GTLM	Porsche 911 RSR	Porsche 4.0 L Flat-6	DAY; 6	SEB; 3	LBH; 7	MDO; 1	WGL; 4	MOS; 6	LIM; 3	ELK; 4	VIR; 5	LGA; 2	PET; 6		5th	308	
2019	Porsche GT Team	912	GTLM	Porsche 911 RSR	Porsche 4.0 L Flat-6	DAY; 3	SEB; 5	LBH; 1	MDO; 1	WGL; 6	MOS; 1	**LIM**; 2	ELK; 3	**VIR**; 2	LGA; 7	PET; 5		1st	330	
2020	Porsche GT Team	912	GTLM	Porsche 911 RSR-19	Porsche 4.2 L Flat-6	DAY; 2	DAY; 2	SEB; 3	**ELK**; 5	VIR; 5	ATL; 6	MDO	CLT; 6	PET; 5	LGA; 1	SEB; 2		6th	289	
2021	Team Hardpoint EBM		GTD	Porsche 911 GT3 R	Porsche 4.0 L Flat-6	DAY; 10	SEB; 10	MDO	DET	WGL	WGL	LIM	ELK	LGA	LBH	VIR		41st	462	
2021	Cadillac Chip Ganassi Racing	01	DPi	Cadillac DPi-V.R	Cadillac 5.5 L V8												PET; 5	20th	284	
2022	Cadillac Racing	02	DPi	Cadillac DPi-V.R	Cadillac 5.5 L V8	DAY; 6	SEB; 1	LBH; 2	LGA; 5	MDO; 4	DET; 3	WGL; 4	MOS; 4	ELK; 2	PET; 5			4th	3191	
2023	Cadillac Racing	02	GTP	Cadillac V-LMDh	Cadillac LMC55R 5. 5 L V8	DAY; 4	SEB	LBH	LGA	WGL	MOS	ELK	IMS	PET				21st	306	
2024	Corvette Racing by Pratt Miller Motorsports	4	GTD Pro	Chevrolet Corvette Z06 GT3.R	Chevrolet LT6 5.5 L V8	DAY; 8	SEB; 11	LGA	DET	WGL	MOS	ELK	VIR	IMS	PET; 12			25th	695	
2025	Cadillac Whelen	31	GTP	Cadillac V-Series.R	Cadillac LMC55R 5. 5 L V8	DAY; 9	SEB; 4	LBH; 4	LGA	DET; 10	WGL; 5	ELK; 4	**IMS**; 1	PET; 1				9th	2448	
2026	Cadillac Whelen	31	GTP	Cadillac V-Series.R	Cadillac LMC55R 5.5 L V8	DAY; 2	**SEB**; 3	LBH	LGA; 2	**DET**; 1	**WGL**; 1	ELK; 8	IMS; 2	PET; 7				5th	2672	

^{*} Season still in progress.

=== Supercars Championship results ===
Supercars results
Year	Team	No.	Car	1	2	3	4	5	6	7	8	9	10	11	12	13	14	15	16	17	18	19	20	21	22	23	24	25	26	27	28	29	30	31	32	Position	Points	Ref
2018	Triple Eight Race Engineering	97	Holden ZB Commodore	ADE; R1	ADE; R2	MEL; R3	MEL; R4	MEL; R5	MEL; R6	SYM; R7	SYM; R8	PHI; R9	PHI; R10	BAR; R11	BAR; R12	WIN; R13; PO	WIN; R14; PO	HID; R15	HID; R16	TOW; R17	TOW; R18	QLD; R19	QLD; R20	SMP; R21	BEN; R22	BEN; R23	SAN; QR; 16	SAN; R24; 2	BAT; R25; 5	SUR; R26; 10	SUR; R27; C	PUK; R28	PUK; R29	NEW; R30	NEW; R31	29th	576	

=== Bathurst 1000 results ===
Year	Team	Car	Co-driver	Position	Laps
2018	Triple Eight Race Engineering	Holden Commodore ZB	(New Zealand) Shane van Gisbergen	5th	161

=== NASCAR ===
(key) (Bold – Pole position awarded by qualifying time. Italics – Pole position earned by points standings or practice time. * – Most laps led.)

==== Xfinity Series ====
NASCAR Xfinity Series results
Year	Team	No.	Make	1	2	3	4	5	6	7	8	9	10	11	12	13	14	15	16	17	18	19	20	21	22	23	24	25	26	27	28	29	30	31	32	33	NXSC	Pts	Ref
2020	Richard Childress Racing	21	Chevy	DAY	LVS	CAL	PHO	DAR	CLT	BRI	ATL	HOM	HOM	TAL	POC	IRC	KEN	KEN	TEX	KAN	ROA	DRC; 33	DOV	DOV	DAY	DAR	RCH	RCH	BRI	LVS	TAL	ROV	KAN	TEX	MAR	PHO	62nd	14	

^{1} Ineligible for series points.

Sporting positions
Preceded by Salman Al Khalifa	Formula BMW Asia; Champion; 2006	Succeeded by Jazeman Jaafar
Preceded by Daniel Gaunt	New Zealand Grand Prix; Winner; 2010	Succeeded by Mitch Evans
Preceded by Alexandre Imperatori	Porsche Carrera Cup Asia; Champion; 2013–2014	Succeeded by Chris van der Drift
Preceded by Nicki Thiim	Porsche Supercup; Champion; 2014	Succeeded by Philipp Eng
Preceded by Marcel Fässler; André Lotterer; Benoît Tréluyer	Winner of the 24 Hours of Le Mans; 2015; With: Nico Hülkenberg & Nick Tandy	Succeeded by Romain Dumas; Neel Jani; Marc Lieb
Preceded by Romain Dumas; Neel Jani; Marc Lieb	Winner of the 24 Hours of Le Mans; 2017; With: Timo Bernhard & Brendon Hartley	Succeeded by Sébastien Buemi; Kazuki Nakajima; Fernando Alonso
Preceded by Romain Dumas; Neel Jani; Marc Lieb	FIA World Endurance Champion; 2017; With: Timo Bernhard & Brendon Hartley	Succeeded by Sébastien Buemi; Kazuki Nakajima; Fernando Alonso
Preceded by Antonio García; Jan Magnussen	WeatherTech SportsCar Championship; GTLM Champion; 2019; With: Laurens Vanthoor	Succeeded by Antonio García; Jordan Taylor
