= Cadillac V-Series.R =

Sports prototype racing car built by Cadillac

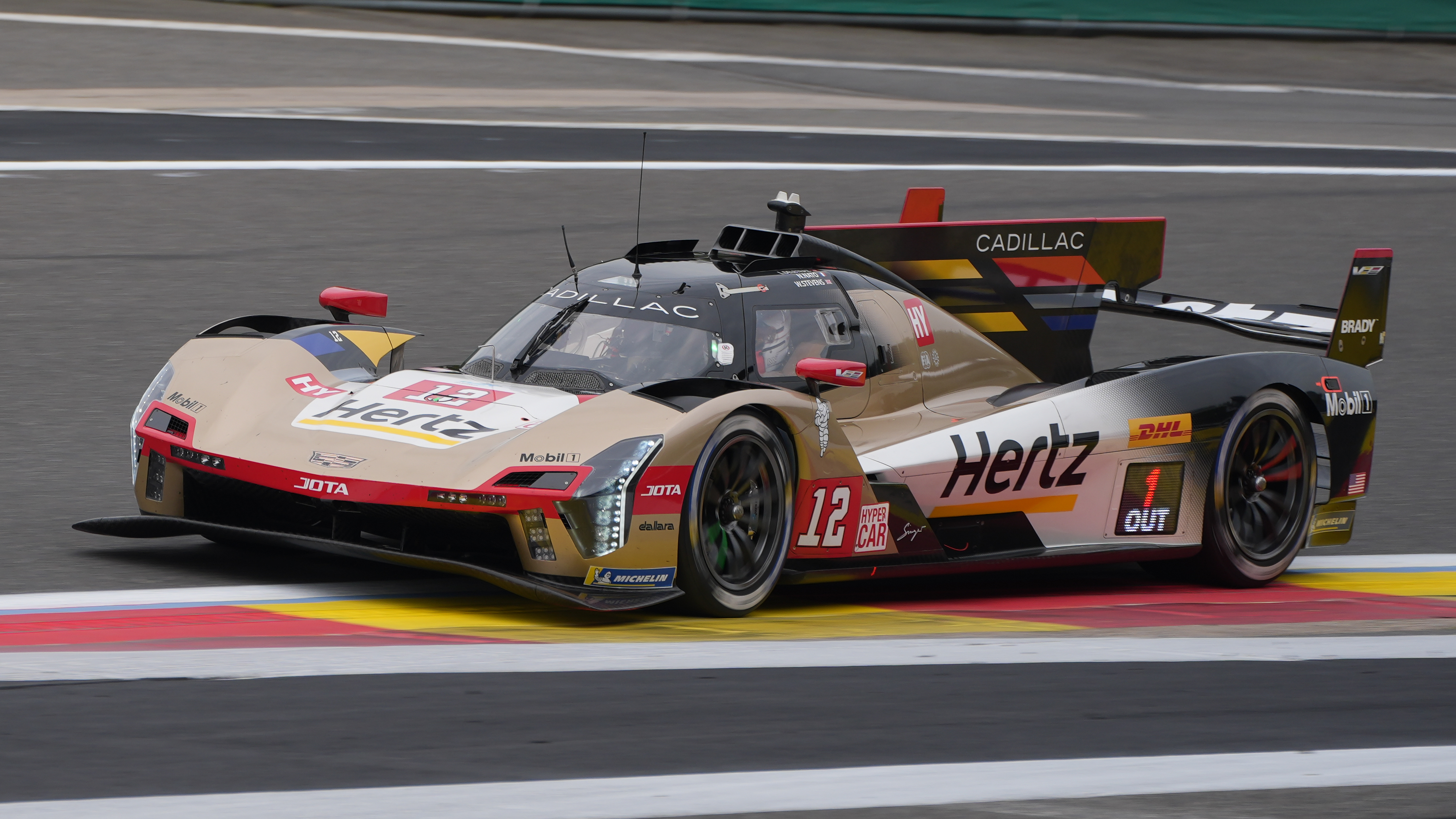
- The No. 12 V-Series.R of Team JOTA at the 2026 6 Hours of Spa-Francorchamps
- Category: Le Mans Daytona h
- Constructor: Cadillac (Dallara)
- Designers: Chris Mikalauskas (Exterior Designer); Aaron Pfeifer (Vehicle Technical Lead); Adam Trojanek (Lead Propulsion Engineer)
- Predecessor: Cadillac DPi-V.R

Technical specifications
- Chassis: LMP2-based Dallara carbon fiber monocoque
- Engine: Cadillac LMC55R 5.5 L 90° V8 NA, 32-valve, DOHC
- Electric motor: Rear-mounted 50 kW (68 PS; 67 hp) spec MGU supplied by Bosch
- Transmission: Xtrac P1359 7-speed sequential manual
- Power: 500 kW (680 PS; 671 hp)
- Weight: 1,030 kg (2,270.8 lb)
- Fuel: TotalEnergies (WEC); VP Racing Fuels (IMSA)
- Lubricants: Mobil 1
- Brakes: Brembo carbon 380/355mm with Brembo Monobloc 6-piston calipers
- Tires: Michelin slicks with OZ one-piece forged alloys, 29/71-18 front and 34/71-18 rear

Competition history
- Notable entrants: (United States) Action Express Racing; (United States) Chip Ganassi Racing; (United Kingdom) Hertz Team Jota; (United States) Wayne Taylor Racing
- Notable drivers: (France) Sébastien Bourdais; (New Zealand) Scott Dixon; (Netherlands) Renger van der Zande; (New Zealand) Earl Bamber; (United Kingdom) Alex Lynn; (United Kingdom) Richard Westbrook; (United Kingdom) Jack Aitken; (Brazil) Pipo Derani; (United Kingdom) Alexander Sims
- Debut: 2023 24 Hours of Daytona
- First win: 2023 12 Hours of Sebring
- Last win: 2026 6 Hours of Monza
- Last event: 2026 6 Hours of Monza
Races	Wins	Podiums	Poles	F/Laps
63	11	14	9	7
- Teams' Championships: 2 (2023 IMSA SCC, 2026 IMSA SCC)
- Constructors' Championships: 2 (2023 IMSA SCC, 2026 IMSA SCC)
- Drivers' Championships: 2 (2023 IMSA SCC, 2026 IMSA SCC)

The Cadillac V-Series.R, originally named the Cadillac V-LMDh, is a sports prototype racing car designed by Cadillac and built by Dallara. It is designed to the Le Mans Daytona h regulations, and debuted in the IMSA SportsCar Championship at the season opening 24 Hours of Daytona. The car is also contesting the FIA World Endurance Championship from 2023 onwards. The V-Series.R uses one of the largest engines in its category, running a naturally aspirated V8 with a 5.5-liter engine displacement.

As of November 2025, the V-Series.R has seven wins to its name and achieved 13 podium finishes. It took the Teams', Drivers' and Manufacturers' Championships of the 2023 IMSA SportsCar Championship season, the first of those completed with Action Express Racing.

== Background ==
On August 24, 2021, Cadillac announced they would participate in IMSA's new GTP class and join the FIA World Endurance Championship's Hypercar class in 2023 using an LMDh-compliant racing design. It was also confirmed on the same day that Dallara was chosen as the chassis supplier for their LMDh contender, and that Action Express Racing and Chip Ganassi Racing would campaign the car in the 2023 IMSA SportsCar Championship season as well as contest the 24 Hours of Le Mans.

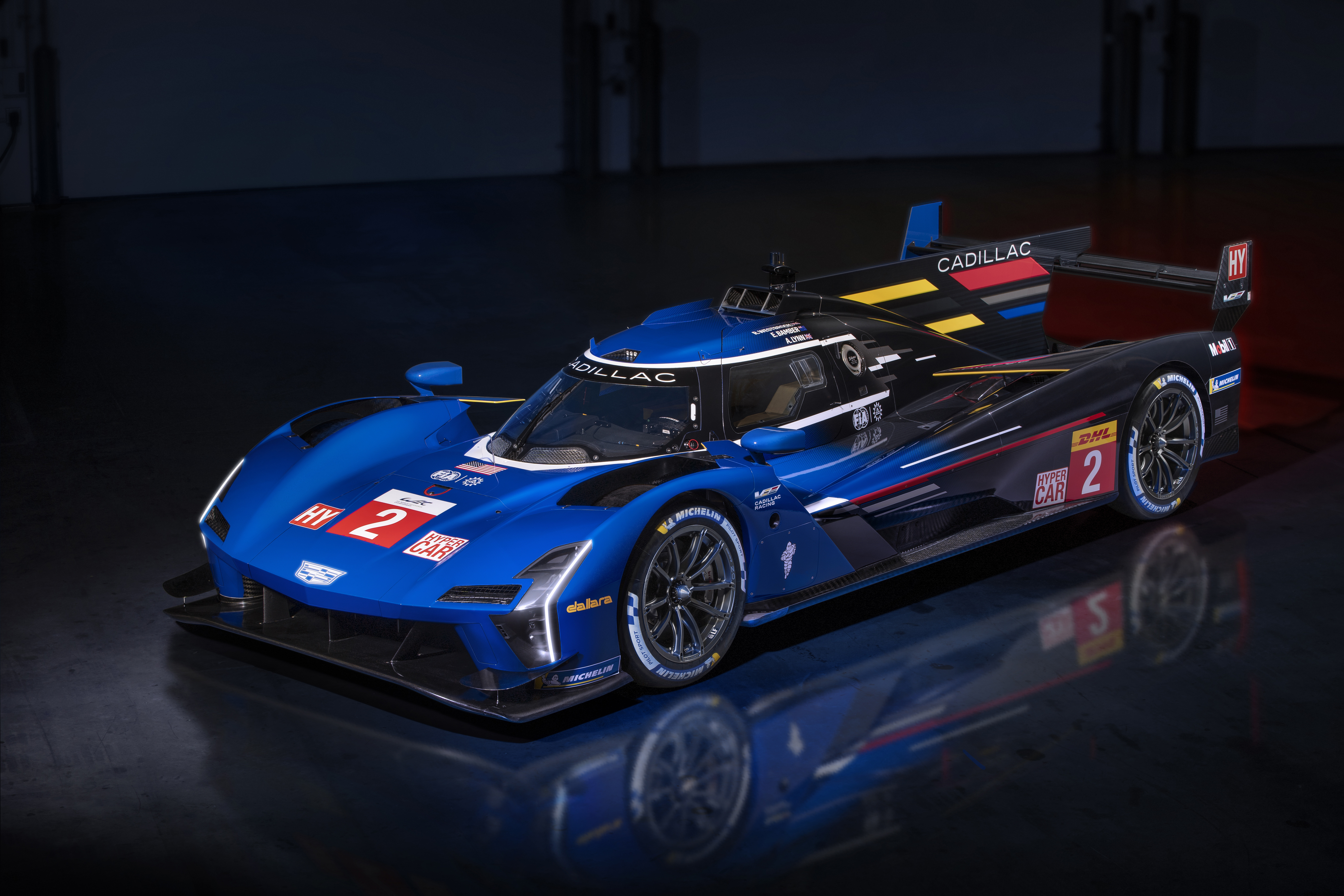
A render of the V-Series.R in 2022

Cadillac released renders of the car on June 9, 2022. It was also announced that the car would use a hybrid powertrain, consisting of a 5.5-liter 90° naturally-aspirated V8 internal combustion engine and standardized hybrid drivetrain components provided by Williams Advanced Engineering, Bosch and Xtrac, and that Chip Ganassi Racing would campaign one car in the 2023 FIA World Endurance Championship season.

The first shakedown was completed in July 2022. This was followed by testing at Sebring International Raceway and Road Atlanta, where the car covered nearly 19,312 km (12,000 mi).

In October 2022, General Motors' sportscar racing program manager Laura Klauser noted that both teams were working together to get the three cars ready on time for the 2023 24 Hours of Daytona. Chip Ganassi Racing would enter two cars for Daytona before splitting both cars to enter the IMSA and WEC seasons on full-time basis respectively. Action Express Racing would only campaign one car for the entire IMSA schedule.

== Competition history ==
=== 2023 ===
Cadillac revealed that the V-Series.R would run under three different primary colors: yellow, blue, and red, each color taken directly from Cadillac's logo. For the 2023 IMSA SportsCar Championship, Chip Ganassi Racing ran the yellow and blue cars under the numbers #01 and #02 respectively competing as the factory Cadillac Racing squad, and Action Express Racing ran the red car under the number #31 competing as Whelen Engineering Racing. The blue car also competed in the 2023 FIA World Endurance Championship as the sole full-time V-Series.R racing under the number #2.

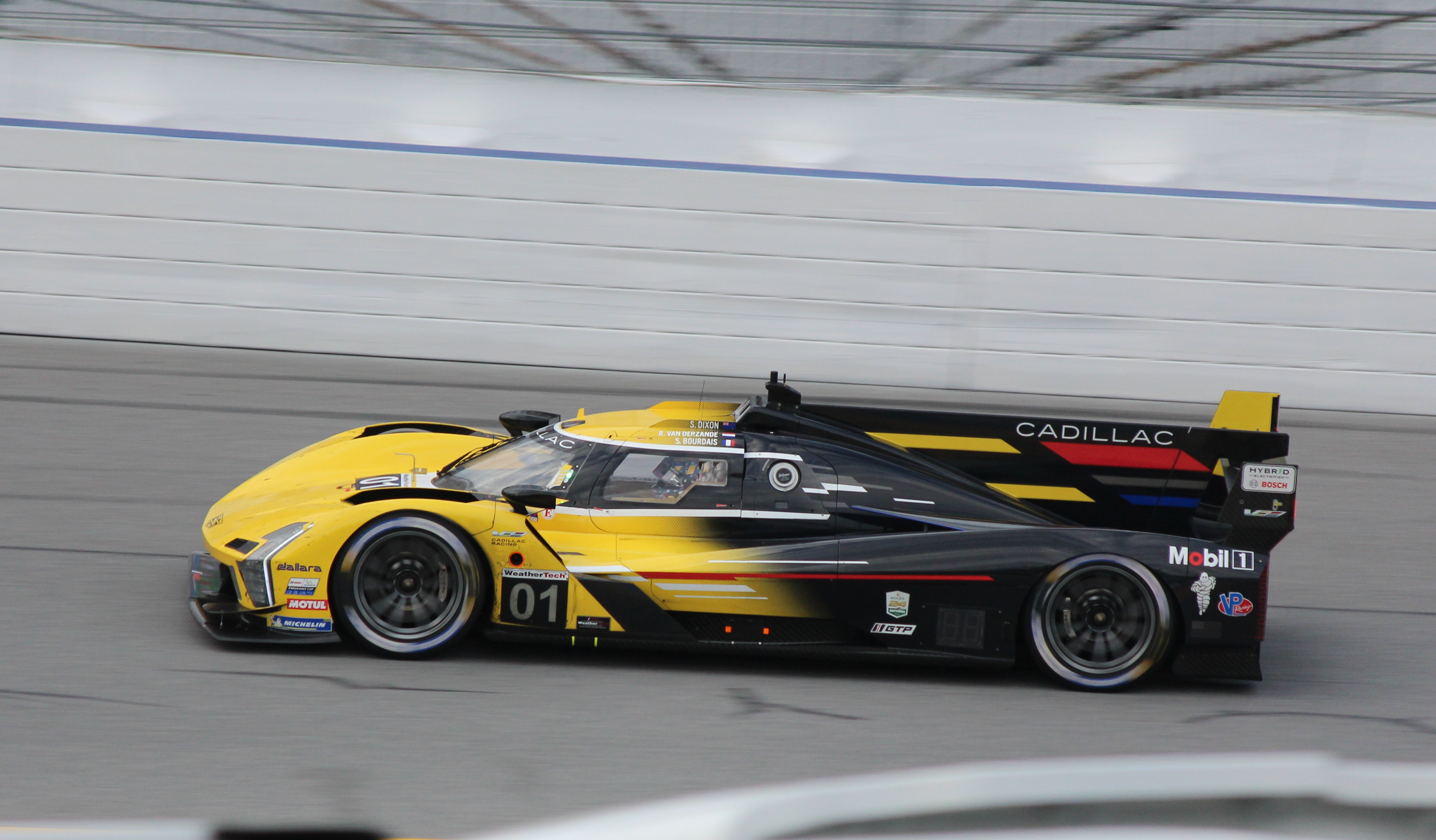
The No. 01 car held the lead of the race during the early morning stages of the 2023 24 Hours of Daytona

The V-Series.R made both its global debut and its IMSA SportsCar Championship debut at the 2023 24 Hours of Daytona alongside three other debutants from Acura, BMW, and Porsche as part of the new Le Mans Hypercar and LMDh regulations that were implemented for the 2023 season onwards. Cadillac were frontrunners for a majority of the race in the early stages, but later struggled to keep pace with Acura's ARX-06 race cars towards the end with the leading #01 Cadillac falling to 3rd overall, still securing a podium at the finish.

The V-Series.R took its first victory in any series at the second round in the 2023 12 Hours of Sebring courtesy of Action Express Racing, despite having to bounce back from an early collision with an LMP3 car. That same weekend, the V-Series.R completed its FIA World Endurance Championship debut, taking home 4th overall, just 10 seconds behind the #50 Ferrari 499P in 3rd. Following the race, Alex Lynn found the results "a fantastic start." Cadillac took home another 4th place finish in the next round at the 2023 6 Hours of Portimão.

An additional V-Series.R was fielded by Cadillac at the 2023 6 Hours of Spa-Francorchamps under the number #3 for the purposes of preparation for the 2023 24 Hours of Le Mans later that year. The car did not see the finish as Renger van der Zande suffered a heavy high-speed collision at Raidillon. He emerged unharmed, and it was later revealed that the car had a suspected power steering failure.

Cadillac's return to the 24 Hours of Le Mans that year marked their first appearance in the endurance race in 21 years, having last competed in the 2002 edition of the race with the Northstar LMP project. All three V-Series.Rs from both IMSA and WEC campaigns participated in the event. The full-season #2 car took a surprising 3rd overall in the race and ran relatively trouble-free, finishing a lap down behind the #51 Ferrari and the #8 Toyota. After the race, Richard Westbrook stated that the podium was a great start to the program.

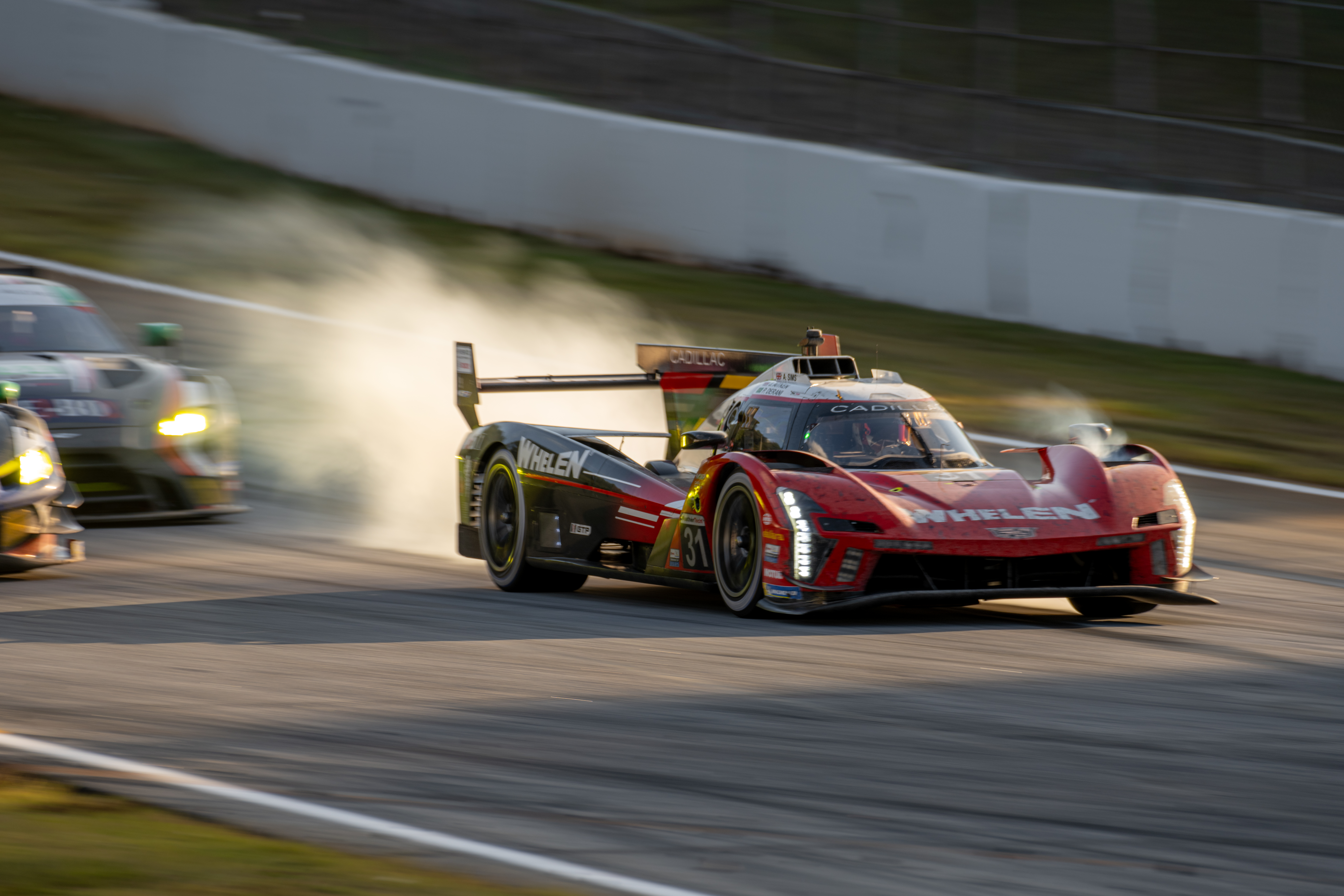
Action Express Racing's #31 Cadillac V-Series.R at the 2023 Petit Le Mans

In IMSA competition, the V-Series.R proceeded to score another win at the 2023 Motul Course de Monterey and two additional podiums at the 2023 Sahlen's Six Hours of The Glen and the 2023 Petit Le Mans, the latter race proving to be a crucial score, as Cadillac and Action Express Racing took home all of the titles after a season-long title fight with Acura and their teams Wayne Taylor Racing and Meyer Shank Racing. In the FIA WEC, Cadillac's drivers finished in fifth with 72 points in the Drivers' Championship and fourth in the Manufacturers' Championship with a tally of 79 points.

=== 2024 ===
Cadillac started their 2024 calendar year strong with the V-Series.R, qualifying on pole position with Action Express Racing at the 2024 24 Hours of Daytona with a track record lap set by Pipo Derani. Action Express Racing spent the length of the race up front and were later in contention for the overall victory against Porsche in the final hour, but ultimately fell to 2nd, only 2.112 seconds behind the race-winning #7 Porsche 963. Cadillac's season start in WEC was less than ideal, receiving a disqualification for a technical breach, a 10th place finish, and a retirement via a high-speed crash in the first three rounds.

In their IMSA campaign, Chip Ganassi Racing's #01 car remained consistent enough to contest for 2nd in the GTP standings against the #6 Porsche, eventually finishing the season in 3rd only five points behind. The defending champion V-Series.R from Action Express Racing concluded their season 4th overall. In total, the Cadillac teams secured eight podiums, two fastest laps, four pole positions, and two wins (both by Chip Ganassi Racing), the most notable coming at the 2024 Petit Le Mans. Cadillac's WEC campaign was largely uneventful, though they were able to score a pole position at the 2024 6 Hours of Fuji.

=== 2025 ===
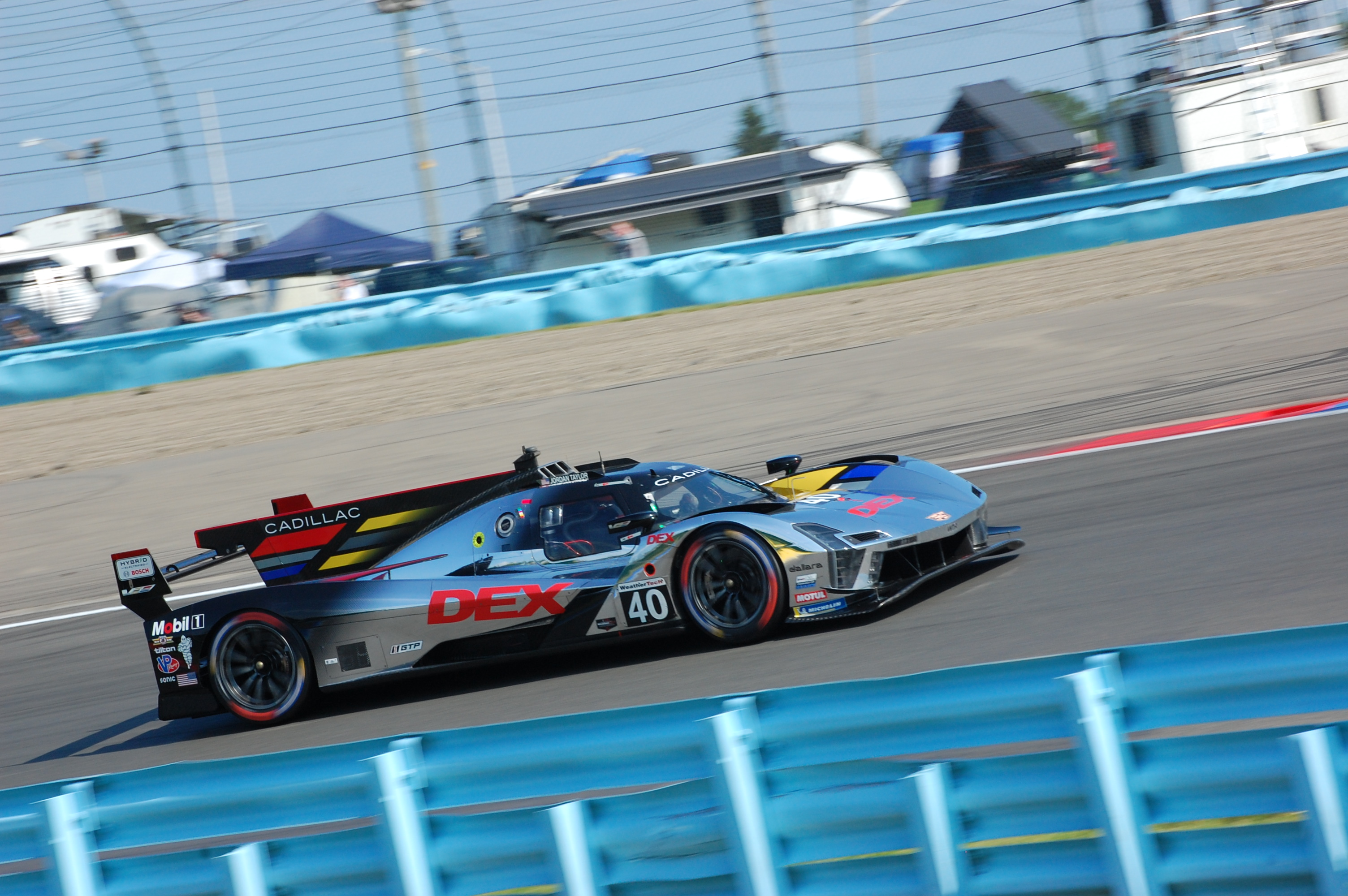
The No. 40 car of Wayne Taylor Racing took second at the 2025 Sahlen's Six Hours of The Glen.

Chip Ganassi Racing departed from Cadillac ahead of the 2025 calendar year, with Wayne Taylor Racing and Jota Sport taking over Cadillac's factory IMSA and WEC operations respectively. In Jota's first race with the V-Series.R, they spent most of the early running contending for the win, but quickly dropped from the lead after both cars suffered damage after colliding with each other during a virtual safety car period. Wayne Taylor Racing's first podium with the V-Series.R came at the 2025 Chevrolet Detroit Sports Car Classic. At the 2025 24 Hours of Le Mans, both of Jota's V-Series.Rs secured a front row lockout in Hyperpole qualifying courtesy of Alex Lynn and Earl Bamber, marking Cadillac's first ever pole position at Le Mans. Lynn scored back-to-back pole positions for Cadillac in the next race at the 2025 6 Hours of São Paulo. On race day, the pole-sitting #12 car took home the victory, with the #38 staying ahead of the #5 Porsche following closely behind to claim both a 1–2 finish and Cadillac's maiden victory in the FIA World Endurance Championship.

== Racing results ==
=== Complete IMSA SportsCar Championship results ===
(key) Races in bold indicates pole position. Races in italics indicates fastest lap.

Year	Entrants	Class	Drivers	No.	1	2	3	4	5	6	7	8	9	Pts.	Pos.
2023					DAY	SEB	LBH	MON	WGL	MOS	ELK	IMS	PET		
2023	Cadillac Racing	GTP	(France) Sébastien Bourdais	01	3	Ret	Ret	1	5	9	4	7	2	2673	7th
2023	Cadillac Racing	GTP	(Netherlands) Renger van der Zande	01	3	Ret	Ret	1	5	9	4	7	2	2673	7th
2023	Cadillac Racing	GTP	(New Zealand) Scott Dixon	01	3	Ret							2	2673	7th
2023	Cadillac Racing	GTP	(New Zealand) Earl Bamber	02	4									306	11th
2023	Cadillac Racing	GTP	(United Kingdom) Alex Lynn	02	4									306	11th
2023	Cadillac Racing	GTP	(United Kingdom) Richard Westbrook	02	4									306	11th
2023	Whelen Engineering Racing	GTP	(United Kingdom) Alexander Sims	31	5	**1**	5	3	2	7	**6**	4	6	2733	1st
2023	Whelen Engineering Racing	GTP	(Brazil) Pipo Derani	31	5	**1**	5	3	2	7	**6**	4	6	2733	1st
2023	Whelen Engineering Racing	GTP	(United Kingdom) Jack Aitken	31	5	**1**			2				6	2733	1st
2024					DAY	SEB	LBH	LGA	DET	WGL	ELK	IMS	ATL		
2024	Cadillac Racing	GTP	(Netherlands) Renger van der Zande	01	Ret	2	1	**5**	3	2	9	6	**1**	2486	3rd
2024	Cadillac Racing	GTP	(France) Sébastien Bourdais	01	Ret	2	1	**5**	3	2	9	6	**1**	2486	3rd
2024	Cadillac Racing	GTP	(New Zealand) Scott Dixon	01	Ret	2							**1**	2486	3rd
2024	Cadillac Racing	GTP	(Spain) Álex Palou	01	Ret									2486	3rd
2024	Whelen Cadillac Racing	GTP	(United Kingdom) Jack Aitken	31	**2**	Ret	**2**	2	6	8	4	Ret	5	2392	4th
2024	Whelen Cadillac Racing	GTP	(Brazil) Pipo Derani	31	**2**	Ret	**2**	2	6	8	4	Ret	5	2392	4th
2024	Whelen Cadillac Racing	GTP	(United Kingdom) Tom Blomqvist	31	**2**	Ret				8		Ret	5	2392	4th
2025					DAY	SEB	LBH	LGA	DET	WGL	ELK	IMS	ATL		
2025	Cadillac Wayne Taylor Racing	GTP	(Portugal) Filipe Albuquerque	10	5	7	6	8	2	3	8	2	6	2626	6th
2025	Cadillac Wayne Taylor Racing	GTP	(New Zealand) Brendon Hartley	10	5									2626	6th
2025	Cadillac Wayne Taylor Racing	GTP	(United Kingdom) Will Stevens	10	5	7							6	2626	6th
2025	Cadillac Wayne Taylor Racing	GTP	(United States) Ricky Taylor	10	5	7	6	8	2	3	8	2	6	2626	6th
2025	Cadillac Wayne Taylor Racing	GTP	(Switzerland) Louis Delétraz	40	Ret	Ret	7	7	Ret	2	9	9	8	2304	9th
2025	Cadillac Wayne Taylor Racing	GTP	(Japan) Kamui Kobayashi	40	Ret	Ret								2304	9th
2025	Cadillac Wayne Taylor Racing	GTP	(United States) Jordan Taylor	40	Ret		7	7	Ret	2	9	9	8	2304	9th
2025	Cadillac Wayne Taylor Racing	GTP	(New Zealand) Brendon Hartley	40		Ret								2304	9th
2025	Cadillac Wayne Taylor Racing	GTP	(France) Norman Nato	40									8	2304	9th
2025	Whelen Cadillac Racing	GTP	(United Kingdom) Jack Aitken	31	9	4	4	6	Ret	5	4	**1**	1	2720	2nd
2025	Whelen Cadillac Racing	GTP	(New Zealand) Earl Bamber	31	9	4	4		Ret	5	4	**1**	1	2720	2nd
2025	Whelen Cadillac Racing	GTP	(Brazil) Felipe Drugovich	31	9									2720	2nd
2025	Whelen Cadillac Racing	GTP	(Denmark) Frederik Vesti	31	9	4		6		5		**1**	1	2720	2nd
2026					DAY	SEB	LBH	LGA	DET	WGL	ELK	IMS	ATL		
2026	Cadillac Wayne Taylor Racing	GTP	(Portugal) Filipe Albuquerque	10	Ret	DSQ	10	Ret	3	7	1	6	4	1873	10th
2026	Cadillac Wayne Taylor Racing	GTP	(United States) Ricky Taylor	10	Ret	DSQ	10	Ret	3	7	1	6	4	1873	10th
2026	Cadillac Wayne Taylor Racing	GTP	(United Kingdom) Will Stevens	10	Ret	DSQ							4	1873	10th
2026	Cadillac Wayne Taylor Racing	GTP	(Switzerland) Louis Delétraz	40	6	7	8	10	6	8	3	4	3	1923	6th
2026	Cadillac Wayne Taylor Racing	GTP	(United States) Jordan Taylor	40	6	7	8	10	6	8	3	4	3	1923	6th
2026	Cadillac Wayne Taylor Racing	GTP	(United States) Colton Herta	40	6	7							3	1923	6th
2026	Cadillac Whelen	GTP	(United Kingdom) Jack Aitken	31	2	3	2	2	1	1	Ret	2	7	2400	1st
2026	Cadillac Whelen	GTP	(New Zealand) Earl Bamber	31	2	3		2	1	1	Ret	2	7	2400	1st
2026	Cadillac Whelen	GTP	(Denmark) Frederik Vesti	31	2	3	2			1	Ret		7	2400	1st
2026	Cadillac Whelen	GTP	(United States) Connor Zilisch	31	2									2400	1st

=== Complete IMSA Michelin Endurance Cup results ===
(key) Races in bold indicates pole position. Races in italics indicates fastest lap.

Year	Entrants	Class	Drivers	No.	1	2	3	4	5	Pts.	Pos.
2023					DAY	SEB	WGL	PET			
2023	Cadillac Racing	GTP	(France) Sébastien Bourdais	01	3	Ret	5	2		38	3rd
2023	Cadillac Racing	GTP	(Netherlands) Renger van der Zande	01	3	Ret	5	2		38	3rd
2023	Cadillac Racing	GTP	(New Zealand) Scott Dixon	01	3	Ret		2		38	3rd
2023	Cadillac Racing	GTP	(New Zealand) Earl Bamber	02	4					9	9th
2023	Cadillac Racing	GTP	(United Kingdom) Alex Lynn	02	4					9	9th
2023	Cadillac Racing	GTP	(United Kingdom) Richard Westbrook	02	4					9	9th
2023	Whelen Engineering Racing	GTP	(United Kingdom) Alexander Sims	31	5	**1**	2	6		40	1st
2023	Whelen Engineering Racing	GTP	(Brazil) Pipo Derani	31	5	**1**	2	6		40	1st
2023	Whelen Engineering Racing	GTP	(United Kingdom) Jack Aitken	31	5	**1**	2	6		40	1st
2024					DAY	SEB	WGL	IMS	ATL		
2024	Cadillac Racing	GTP	(Netherlands) Renger van der Zande	01	Ret	2	2	6	**1**	42	2nd
2024	Cadillac Racing	GTP	(France) Sébastien Bourdais	01	Ret	2	2	6	**1**	42	2nd
2024	Cadillac Racing	GTP	(New Zealand) Scott Dixon	01	Ret	2			**1**	42	2nd
2024	Cadillac Racing	GTP	(Spain) Álex Palou	01	Ret					42	2nd
2024	Whelen Cadillac Racing	GTP	(United Kingdom) Jack Aitken	31	**2**	Ret	Ret	Ret	5	38	4th
2024	Whelen Cadillac Racing	GTP	(Brazil) Pipo Derani	31	**2**	Ret	Ret	Ret	5	38	4th
2024	Whelen Cadillac Racing	GTP	(United Kingdom) Tom Blomqvist	31	**2**	Ret	Ret	Ret	5	38	4th
2025					DAY	SEB	WGL	IMS	ATL		
2025	Cadillac Wayne Taylor Racing	GTP	(Portugal) Filipe Albuquerque	10	5	7	3	2	6	33	6th
2025	Cadillac Wayne Taylor Racing	GTP	(New Zealand) Brendon Hartley	10	5					33	6th
2025	Cadillac Wayne Taylor Racing	GTP	(United Kingdom) Will Stevens	10	5	7			6	33	6th
2025	Cadillac Wayne Taylor Racing	GTP	(United States) Ricky Taylor	10	5	7	3	2	6	33	6th
2025	Cadillac Wayne Taylor Racing	GTP	(Switzerland) Louis Delétraz	40	Ret	Ret	2	9	8	31	7th
2025	Cadillac Wayne Taylor Racing	GTP	(Japan) Kamui Kobayashi	40	Ret	Ret				31	7th
2025	Cadillac Wayne Taylor Racing	GTP	(United States) Jordan Taylor	40	Ret		2	9	8	31	7th
2025	Cadillac Wayne Taylor Racing	GTP	(New Zealand) Brendon Hartley	40		Ret				31	7th
2025	Cadillac Wayne Taylor Racing	GTP	(France) Norman Nato	40					8	31	7th
2025	Whelen Cadillac Racing	GTP	(United Kingdom) Jack Aitken	31	9	4	5	**1**	1	45	2nd
2025	Whelen Cadillac Racing	GTP	(New Zealand) Earl Bamber	31	9	4	5	**1**	1	45	2nd
2025	Whelen Cadillac Racing	GTP	(Brazil) Felipe Drugovich	31	9					45	2nd
2025	Whelen Cadillac Racing	GTP	(Denmark) Frederik Vesti	31	9	4	5	**1**	1	45	2nd
2026					DAY	SEB	WGL	ELK	ATL		
2026	Cadillac Wayne Taylor Racing	GTP	(Portugal) Filipe Albuquerque	10	Ret	DSQ	7	1	4	32	7th
2026	Cadillac Wayne Taylor Racing	GTP	(United States) Ricky Taylor	10	Ret	DSQ	7	1	4	32	7th
2026	Cadillac Wayne Taylor Racing	GTP	(United Kingdom) Will Stevens	10	Ret	DSQ			4	32	7th
2026	Cadillac Wayne Taylor Racing	GTP	(Switzerland) Louis Delétraz	40	6	7	8	3	3	31	8th
2026	Cadillac Wayne Taylor Racing	GTP	(United States) Jordan Taylor	40	6	7	8	3	3	31	8th
2026	Cadillac Wayne Taylor Racing	GTP	(United States) Colton Herta	40	6	7			3	31	8th
2026	Cadillac Whelen	GTP	(United Kingdom) Jack Aitken	31	2	**3**	**1**	Ret	7	43	2nd
2026	Cadillac Whelen	GTP	(New Zealand) Earl Bamber	31	2	**3**	**1**	Ret	7	43	2nd
2026	Cadillac Whelen	GTP	(Denmark) Frederik Vesti	31	2	**3**	**1**	Ret	7	43	2nd
2026	Cadillac Whelen	GTP	(United States) Connor Zilisch	31	2					43	2nd

=== Complete FIA World Endurance Championship results ===
(key) Races in bold indicates pole position. Races in italics indicates fastest lap.

Year	Entrants	Class	Drivers	No.	1	2	3	4	5	6	7	8	Points	Pos
2023					SEB	POR	SPA	LMN	MON	FUJ	BHR			
2023	Cadillac Racing	Hypercar	(New Zealand) Earl Bamber	2	4	4	5	3	10	10	11		79	4th
2023	Cadillac Racing	Hypercar	(United Kingdom) Alex Lynn	2	4	4	5	3	10	10	11		79	4th
2023	Cadillac Racing	Hypercar	(United Kingdom) Richard Westbrook	2	4	4	5	3	10	10	11		79	4th
2023	Cadillac Racing	Hypercar	(France) Sébastien Bourdais	3			Ret	4					**	**
2023	Cadillac Racing	Hypercar	(Netherlands) Renger van der Zande	3			Ret	4					**	**
2023	Cadillac Racing	Hypercar	(United Kingdom) Jack Aitken	3			Ret						**	**
2023	Cadillac Racing	Hypercar	(New Zealand) Scott Dixon	3				4					**	**
2023	Action Express Racing	Hypercar	(United Kingdom) Alexander Sims	311				17					**	**
2023	Action Express Racing	Hypercar	(Brazil) Pipo Derani	311				17					**	**
2023	Action Express Racing	Hypercar	(United Kingdom) Jack Aitken	311				17					**	**
2024					QAT	IMO	SPA	LMN	SAO	COA	FUJ	BHR		
2024	Cadillac Racing	Hypercar	(New Zealand) Earl Bamber	2	DSQ	10	Ret	7	13	4	**Ret**	6	42	6th
2024	Cadillac Racing	Hypercar	(United Kingdom) Alex Lynn	2	DSQ	10	Ret	7	13	4	**Ret**	6	42	6th
2024	Cadillac Racing	Hypercar	(France) Sébastien Bourdais	2	DSQ							6	42	6th
2024	Cadillac Racing	Hypercar	(Spain) Álex Palou	2				7					42	6th
2024	Cadillac Racing	Hypercar	(France) Sébastien Bourdais	3				Ret					**	**
2024	Cadillac Racing	Hypercar	(Netherlands) Renger van der Zande	3				Ret					**	**
2024	Cadillac Racing	Hypercar	(New Zealand) Scott Dixon	3				Ret					**	**
2024	Whelen Cadillac Racing	Hypercar	(Brazil) Felipe Drugovich	311				15					**	**
2024	Whelen Cadillac Racing	Hypercar	(Brazil) Pipo Derani	311				15					**	**
2024	Whelen Cadillac Racing	Hypercar	(United Kingdom) Jack Aitken	311				15					**	**
2025					QAT	IMO	SPA	LMN	SAO	COA	FUJ	BHR		
2025	Cadillac Hertz Team Jota	Hypercar	(United Kingdom) Alex Lynn	12	8	10	5	**4**	**1**	8	6	5	158	4th
2025	Cadillac Hertz Team Jota	Hypercar	(France) Norman Nato	12	8	10	5	**4**	**1**	8	6	5	158	4th
2025	Cadillac Hertz Team Jota	Hypercar	(United Kingdom) Will Stevens	12	8	10	5	**4**	**1**	8	6	5	158	4th
2025	Cadillac Hertz Team Jota	Hypercar	(New Zealand) Earl Bamber	38	16	16	6	7	2	6	13	16	158	4th
2025	Cadillac Hertz Team Jota	Hypercar	(France) Sébastien Bourdais	38	16	16	6	7	2	6	13	16	158	4th
2025	Cadillac Hertz Team Jota	Hypercar	(United Kingdom) Jenson Button	38	16	16	6	7	2	6	13	16	158	4th
2025	Cadillac Wayne Taylor Racing	Hypercar	(Portugal) Filipe Albuquerque	101				Ret					**	**
2025	Cadillac Wayne Taylor Racing	Hypercar	(United States) Jordan Taylor	101				Ret					**	**
2025	Cadillac Wayne Taylor Racing	Hypercar	(United States) Ricky Taylor	101				Ret					**	**
2025	Whelen Cadillac Racing	Hypercar	(United Kingdom) Jack Aitken	311				Ret					**	**
2025	Whelen Cadillac Racing	Hypercar	(Brazil) Felipe Drugovich	311				Ret					**	**
2025	Whelen Cadillac Racing	Hypercar	(Denmark) Frederik Vesti	311				Ret					**	**
2026*					IMO	SPA	LMN	SAO	COA	FUJ	CAT	MNZ		
2026*	Cadillac Hertz Team Jota	Hypercar	(Switzerland) Louis Delétraz	12		9	4	3					96	5th
2026*	Cadillac Hertz Team Jota	Hypercar	(France) Norman Nato	12	13	9	4	3	9	7			96	5th
2026*	Cadillac Hertz Team Jota	Hypercar	(United Kingdom) Will Stevens	12	13	9	4	3	9	7			96	5th
2026*	Cadillac Hertz Team Jota	Hypercar	(United States) Ricky Taylor	12					9				96	5th
2026*	Cadillac Hertz Team Jota	Hypercar	(United Kingdom) Jack Aitken	38		Ret	Ret	4	2	5			96	5th
2026*	Cadillac Hertz Team Jota	Hypercar	(New Zealand) Earl Bamber	38	8	Ret	Ret	4	2	5			96	5th
2026*	Cadillac Hertz Team Jota	Hypercar	(France) Sébastien Bourdais	38	8	Ret	Ret	4	2	5			96	5th
2026*	Cadillac WTR	Hypercar	(Portugal) Filipe Albuquerque	101			9						**	**
2026*	Cadillac WTR	Hypercar	(United States) Jordan Taylor	101			9						**	**
2026*	Cadillac WTR	Hypercar	(United States) Ricky Taylor	101			9						**	**

* Season in progress.

** Not eligible for championship points.

=== Race Victories ===
Year	Series	Race	Track	Car #	Team	Category
2023	IMSA	12 Hours of Sebring	(United States) Sebring International Raceway	31	(United States) Whelen Engineering Racing	GTP
2023	IMSA	Motul Course de Monterey	(United States) WeatherTech Raceway Laguna Seca	01	(United States) Cadillac Racing	GTP
2024	IMSA	Grand Prix of Long Beach	(United States) Long Beach Street Circuit	01	(United States) Cadillac Racing	GTP
2024	IMSA	Petit Le Mans	(United States) Road Atlanta	01	(United States) Cadillac Racing	GTP
2025	WEC	6 Hours of São Paulo	(Brazil) Autódromo José Carlos Pace	12	(United States) Cadillac Hertz Team Jota	Hypercar
2025	IMSA	IMSA Battle on the Bricks	(United States) Indianapolis Motor Speedway	31	(United States) Cadillac Whelen	GTP
2025	IMSA	Petit Le Mans	(United States) Road Atlanta	31	(United States) Cadillac Whelen	GTP
2026	IMSA	Detroit Sports Car Classic	(United States) Detroit Street Circuit	31	(United States) Cadillac Whelen	GTP
2026	IMSA	Sahlen's Six Hours of The Glen	(United States) Watkins Glen International	31	(United States) Cadillac Whelen	GTP
2026	IMSA	SportsCar Endurance Grand Prix	(United States) Road America	10	(United States) Cadillac Wayne Taylor Racing	GTP
2026	WEC	6 Hours of Monza	(Italy) Autodromo Nazionale di Monza	38	(United States) Cadillac Hertz Team Jota	Hypercar
