= Cadillac LMC55R engine =

Overview
- Manufacturer: Cadillac
- Production: 2023-present

Layout
- Configuration: 90° V8
- Displacement: 5.5 L (5,463 cc)
- Cylinder bore: 104.25 mm (4.104 in)
- Piston stroke: 80 mm (3.1 in)
- Cylinder block material: Aluminium alloy
- Cylinder head material: Aluminium alloy
- Valvetrain: 32-valve (four-valves per cylinder), DOHC

RPM range
- Max. engine speed: 8,800

Combustion
- Fuel system: Gasoline direct injection
- Management: Bosch Motronic MS7 ECU
- Fuel type: TotalEnergies (WEC); VP Racing Fuels (IMSA)
- Oil system: Dry sump

Output
- Power output: 670 hp (500 kW; 679 PS)

Dimensions
- Length: 25.2 in (640 mm)
- Dry weight: 396.8 lb (180 kg)

The Cadillac LMC55R engine is a naturally aspirated, four-stroke, 5.5-liter, V8 racing engine, made by GM Racing and Performance Center team for use in their Cadillac V-Series.R LMDh race car, since 2023.

== Design ==
Cadillac developed the bespoke cross-plane engine for their 2023 Cadillac V-Series.R and is the first naturally aspirated engine of the LMDh manufacturers. In accordance with the LMDh rules, the LMC55R internal combustion engine is connected to the standardized hybrid drivetrain components provided by Bosch (motor generator unit), Williams Advanced Engineering (battery pack), and an Xtrac P1359 gearbox.

== Applications ==
- Cadillac V-Series.R
