= 2026 6 Hours of São Paulo =

Sports car endurance race

(Brazil) 2026 Rolex 6 Hours of São Paulo
Event information
- Round 4 of 8 in the 2026 FIA World Endurance Championship
- Date: 12 July 2026
- Location: São Paulo
- Venue: Autódromo José Carlos Pace
- Duration: 6 hours

Results
- Laps completed: 242
- Distance (km): 1,042.78
- Distance (miles): 647.95
- Hypercar

Pole position
- Time: 1:23.041
- Team: (United States) Cadillac Hertz Team Jota
- Drivers: (France) Norman Nato (United Kingdom) Will Stevens

Winners
- Team: (Germany) BMW M Team WRT
- Drivers: (Denmark) Kevin Magnussen (Switzerland) Raffaele Marciello (Belgium) Dries Vanthoor
- LMGT3

Winners
- Team: Racing Team Turkey by TF
- Drivers: (Republic of Ireland) Peter Dempsey (Republic of Ireland) Charlie Eastwood (Turkey) Salih Yoluç

The 2026 6 Hours of São Paulo (formally known as the 2026 Rolex 6 Hours of São Paulo) was an endurance sportscar racing event, held between 10 and 12 July 2026 at Autódromo José Carlos Pace in São Paulo, Brazil. It was the fourth of eight rounds of the 2026 FIA World Endurance Championship and the sixth running of the event.

== Entry list ==
The entry list consisted of 35 cars, with 17 in Hypercar and 18 in LMGT3. Due to Alex Lynn's neck injury, the No. 12 Hertz Team Jota Cadillac competed with 2 drivers. Both Heart of Racing Aston Martins also each entered 2 drivers, with Ross Gunn in the No. 007 and Roman De Angelis in the No. 009 being absent.

In LMGT3, due to clashing with the 2026 Chevrolet Grand Prix of the IMSA SportsCar Championship, Eduardo Barrichello was absent from the No. 23 Heart of Racing Team Aston Martin lineup, and Nicky Catsburg was replaced by Nicolás Varrone in the No. 33 TF Sport Corvette. Additionally, Esteban Masson returned to his seat in the No. 78 Akkodis ASP Team Lexus after competing in LMP2 at Le Mans.

== Schedule ==
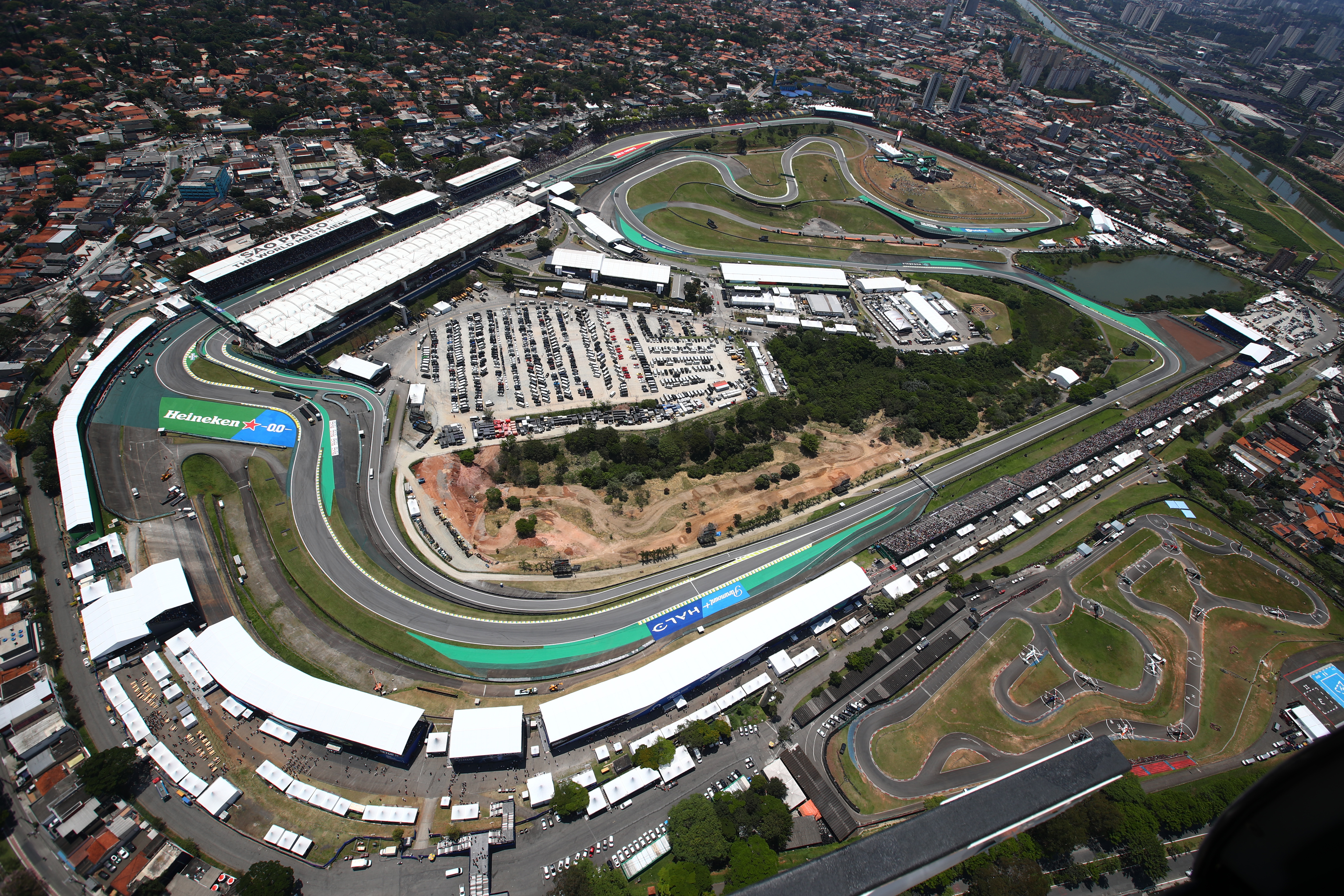
Autódromo José Carlos Pace, where the race was held

Date	Time (local: BRT)	Event
Friday, 10 July	11:00	Free Practice 1
Friday, 10 July	15:50	Free Practice 2
Saturday, 11 July	10:10	Free Practice 3
Saturday, 11 July	14:30	Qualifying – LMGT3
Saturday, 11 July	14:50	Hyperpole – LMGT3
Saturday, 11 July	15:10	Qualifying – Hypercar
Saturday, 11 July	15:30	Hyperpole – Hypercar
Sunday, 12 July	11:30	Race

== Practice ==
Three practice sessions are scheduled to be held before the event: two on Friday and one on Saturday. The first two sessions on Friday ran for 90 minutes, and the final session on Saturday ran for 60 minutes.

=== Practice 1 ===
Class	No.	Entrant	Driver	Time
Hypercar	007	(United Kingdom) Aston Martin THOR Team	(United Kingdom) Harry Tincknell	1:25.457
LMGT3	61	(Italy) Iron Lynx	(Belgium) Maxime Martin	1:34.833

- Note: Only the fastest car in each class is shown.

=== Practice 2 ===
Class	No.	Entrant	Driver	Time
Hypercar	19	(South Korea) Genesis Magma Racing	(France) Mathieu Jaminet	1:24.271
LMGT3	87	(France) Akkodis ASP Team	(Austria) Clemens Schmid	1:34.498

- Note: Only the fastest car in each class is shown.

=== Practice 3 ===
Class	No.	Entrant	Driver	Time
Hypercar	36	(France) Alpine Endurance Team	(France) Victor Martins	1:24.038
LMGT3	61	(Italy) Iron Lynx	(Angola) Rui Andrade	1:34.283

- Note: Only the fastest car in each class is shown.

== Qualifying ==
=== Qualifying results ===
Qualifying started at 14:30 BRT on Saturday, with one twelve-minute qualifying session and one ten-minute hyperpole session per class, resulting in two qualifying and two hyperpole sessions in total.

Pole position winners in each class and fastest times in each session are marked in bold.

Pos	Class	No.	Entrant	Qualifying	Hyperpole	Grid
1	**Hypercar**	**12**	**(United States) Cadillac Hertz Team Jota**	**1:23.603**	**1:23.041**	1
2	Hypercar	38	(United States) Cadillac Hertz Team Jota	1:23.482	1:23.089	2
3	Hypercar	36	(France) Alpine Endurance Team	1:23.616	1:23.108	3
4	Hypercar	15	(Germany) BMW M Team WRT	1:23.695	1:23.135	4
5	Hypercar	35	(France) Alpine Endurance Team	1:23.546	1:23.168	5
6	Hypercar	19	(South Korea) Genesis Magma Racing	1:23.491	1:23.341	7^{1}
7	Hypercar	50	(Italy) Ferrari AF Corse	1:23.524	1:23.387	6
8	Hypercar	94	(France) Peugeot TotalEnergies	1:23.598	1:23.402	8
9	Hypercar	007	(United States) Aston Martin THOR Team	1:23.773	1:23.578	9
10	Hypercar	83	(Italy) Ferrari AF Corse	1:23.683	1:23.625	10
11	Hypercar	51	(Italy) Ferrari AF Corse	1:23.832		11
12	Hypercar	17	(South Korea) Genesis Magma Racing	1:23.984		12
13	Hypercar	93	(France) Peugeot TotalEnergies	1:24.010		13
14	Hypercar	8	(Japan) Toyota Racing	1:24.048		14
15	Hypercar	009	(United States) Aston Martin THOR Team	1:24.151		15
16	Hypercar	7	(Japan) Toyota Racing	1:24.010		17^{2}
17	Hypercar	20	(Germany) BMW M Team WRT	1:24.221		16
18	**LMGT3**	23	**(United States) Heart of Racing Team**	**1:34.527**	**1:33.350**	18
19	LMGT3	79	(Italy) Iron Lynx	1:34.720	1:33.549	19
20	LMGT3	87	(France) Akkodis ASP Team	1:34.537	1:33.764	20
21	LMGT3	69	(Belgium) Team WRT	1:34.190	1:33.766	21
22	LMGT3	77	(Germany) Proton Competition	1:34.501	1:33.773	22
23	LMGT3	61	(Italy) Iron Lynx	1:34.570	1:33.873	23
24	LMGT3	92	(Germany) The Bend Manthey	1:34.558	1:34.069	24
25	LMGT3	88	(Germany) Proton Competition	1:34.566	1:34.281	25
26	LMGT3	32	(Belgium) Team WRT	1:34.676	1:34.326	26
27	LMGT3	34	Racing Team Turkey by TF	1:33.808	1:34.612	27
28	LMGT3	91	(Germany) Manthey DK Engineering	1:34.913		28
29	LMGT3	33	(United Kingdom) TF Sport	1:35.003		29
30	LMGT3	54	(Italy) Vista AF Corse	1:35.112		30
31	LMGT3	10	(United Kingdom) Garage 59	1:35.135		31
32	LMGT3	27	(United States) Heart of Racing Team	1:35.206		32
33	LMGT3	78	(France) Akkodis ASP Team	1:35.211		33
34	LMGT3	21	(Italy) Vista AF Corse	1:35.231		34
35	LMGT3	58	(United Kingdom) Garage 59	1:35.262		35

Notes

- **^1** – The No. 19 Genesis Magma Racing originally qualified in 6th, but was given a one-place grid penalty for impeding the No. 20 BMW M Team WRT.
- **^2** – The No. 7 Toyota Racing originally qualified in 16th, but was given a three-place grid penalty for impeding the No. 19 Genesis Magma Racing. Thus, they started at the back of the Hypercar grid in 17th.

== Results ==
=== Race results ===
The race started at 11:30 BRT on Sunday.

The minimum number of laps for classification will be 70 percent of the overall race winner's distance. Class winners are denoted in bold and ‡.

Final race classification
Pos	Class	No.	Team	Drivers	Chassis	Tyre	Laps	Time/Reason
Pos	Class	No.	Team	Drivers	Engine	Tyre	Laps	Time/Reason
1	**Hypercar**	**15**	**(Germany) BMW M Team WRT**	**(Denmark) Kevin Magnussen** **(Switzerland) Raffaele Marciello** **(Belgium) Dries Vanthoor**	**BMW M Hybrid V8**	M	**242**	**6:00:26.462‡**
1	**Hypercar**	**15**	**(Germany) BMW M Team WRT**	**(Denmark) Kevin Magnussen** **(Switzerland) Raffaele Marciello** **(Belgium) Dries Vanthoor**	**BMW P66/3 4.0 L Turbo V8**	M	**242**	**6:00:26.462‡**
2	Hypercar	51	(Italy) Ferrari AF Corse	(United Kingdom) James Calado (Italy) Antonio Giovinazzi (Italy) Alessandro Pier Guidi	Ferrari 499P	M	242	+2.254
2	Hypercar	51	(Italy) Ferrari AF Corse	(United Kingdom) James Calado (Italy) Antonio Giovinazzi (Italy) Alessandro Pier Guidi	Ferrari F163CG 3.0 L Turbo V6	M	242	+2.254
3	Hypercar	12	(United States) Cadillac Hertz Team Jota	(France) Norman Nato (United Kingdom) Will Stevens	Cadillac V-Series.R	M	242	+6.687
3	Hypercar	12	(United States) Cadillac Hertz Team Jota	(France) Norman Nato (United Kingdom) Will Stevens	Cadillac LMC55R 5.5 L V8	M	242	+6.687
4	Hypercar	38	(United States) Cadillac Hertz Team Jota	(United Kingdom) Jack Aitken (New Zealand) Earl Bamber (France) Sébastien Bourdais	Cadillac V-Series.R	M	242	+12.666
4	Hypercar	38	(United States) Cadillac Hertz Team Jota	(United Kingdom) Jack Aitken (New Zealand) Earl Bamber (France) Sébastien Bourdais	Cadillac LMC55R 5.5 L V8	M	242	+12.666
5	Hypercar	83	(Italy) AF Corse	(United Kingdom) Phil Hanson (Poland) Robert Kubica (China) Yifei Ye	Ferrari 499P	M	242	+32.351
5	Hypercar	83	(Italy) AF Corse	(United Kingdom) Phil Hanson (Poland) Robert Kubica (China) Yifei Ye	Ferrari F163CG 3.0 L Turbo V6	M	242	+32.351
6	Hypercar	007	(United States) Aston Martin THOR Team	(United Kingdom) Tom Gamble (United Kingdom) Harry Tincknell	Aston Martin Valkyrie	M	242	+35.566
6	Hypercar	007	(United States) Aston Martin THOR Team	(United Kingdom) Tom Gamble (United Kingdom) Harry Tincknell	Aston Martin RA 6.5 L V12	M	242	+35.566
7	Hypercar	50	(Italy) Ferrari AF Corse	(Italy) Antonio Fuoco (Spain) Miguel Molina (Denmark) Nicklas Nielsen	Ferrari 499P	M	242	+39.952
7	Hypercar	50	(Italy) Ferrari AF Corse	(Italy) Antonio Fuoco (Spain) Miguel Molina (Denmark) Nicklas Nielsen	Ferrari F163CG 3.0 L Turbo V6	M	242	+39.952
8	Hypercar	20	(Germany) BMW M Team WRT	(Netherlands) Robin Frijns (Germany) René Rast (South Africa) Sheldon van der Linde	BMW M Hybrid V8	M	242	+40.047^{1}
8	Hypercar	20	(Germany) BMW M Team WRT	(Netherlands) Robin Frijns (Germany) René Rast (South Africa) Sheldon van der Linde	BMW P66/3 4.0 L Turbo V8	M	242	+40.047^{1}
9	Hypercar	009	(United States) Aston Martin THOR Team	(Spain) Alex Riberas (Denmark) Marco Sørensen	Aston Martin Valkyrie	M	242	+45.523
9	Hypercar	009	(United States) Aston Martin THOR Team	(Spain) Alex Riberas (Denmark) Marco Sørensen	Aston Martin RA 6.5 L V12	M	242	+45.523
10	Hypercar	35	(France) Alpine Endurance Team	(Portugal) António Félix da Costa (Austria) Ferdinand Habsburg (France) Charles Milesi	Alpine A424	M	242	+56.996
10	Hypercar	35	(France) Alpine Endurance Team	(Portugal) António Félix da Costa (Austria) Ferdinand Habsburg (France) Charles Milesi	Alpine V634 3.4 L Turbo V6	M	242	+56.996
11	Hypercar	36	(France) Alpine Endurance Team	(France) Jules Gounon (France) Frédéric Makowiecki (France) Victor Martins	Alpine A424	M	242	+1:17.818
11	Hypercar	36	(France) Alpine Endurance Team	(France) Jules Gounon (France) Frédéric Makowiecki (France) Victor Martins	Alpine V634 3.4 L Turbo V6	M	242	+1:17.818
12	Hypercar	7	(Japan) Toyota Racing	(United Kingdom) Mike Conway (Japan) Kamui Kobayashi (Netherlands) Nyck de Vries	Toyota TR010 Hybrid	M	241	+1 Lap
12	Hypercar	7	(Japan) Toyota Racing	(United Kingdom) Mike Conway (Japan) Kamui Kobayashi (Netherlands) Nyck de Vries	Toyota H8909 3.5 L Turbo V6	M	241	+1 Lap
13	Hypercar	19	(South Korea) Genesis Magma Racing	(France) Paul-Loup Chatin (France) Mathieu Jaminet (Spain) Daniel Juncadella	Genesis GMR-001	M	241	+1 Lap
13	Hypercar	19	(South Korea) Genesis Magma Racing	(France) Paul-Loup Chatin (France) Mathieu Jaminet (Spain) Daniel Juncadella	Genesis G8MR 3.2 L Turbo V8	M	241	+1 Lap
14	Hypercar	94	(France) Peugeot TotalEnergies	(France) Loïc Duval (Denmark) Malthe Jakobsen (France) Théo Pourchaire	Peugeot 9X8	M	241	+1 Lap
14	Hypercar	94	(France) Peugeot TotalEnergies	(France) Loïc Duval (Denmark) Malthe Jakobsen (France) Théo Pourchaire	Peugeot X6H 2.6 L Turbo V6	M	241	+1 Lap
15	Hypercar	17	(South Korea) Genesis Magma Racing	(Brazil) Pipo Derani (France) Mathys Jaubert (Germany) André Lotterer	Genesis GMR-001	M	241	+1 Lap
15	Hypercar	17	(South Korea) Genesis Magma Racing	(Brazil) Pipo Derani (France) Mathys Jaubert (Germany) André Lotterer	Genesis G8MR 3.2 L Turbo V8	M	241	+1 Lap
16	Hypercar	93	(France) Peugeot TotalEnergies	(New Zealand) Nick Cassidy (United Kingdom) Paul di Resta (Belgium) Stoffel Vandoorne	Peugeot 9X8	M	240	+2 Laps
16	Hypercar	93	(France) Peugeot TotalEnergies	(New Zealand) Nick Cassidy (United Kingdom) Paul di Resta (Belgium) Stoffel Vandoorne	Peugeot X6H 2.6 L Turbo V6	M	240	+2 Laps
17	Hypercar	8	(Japan) Toyota Racing	(Switzerland) Sébastien Buemi (New Zealand) Brendon Hartley (Japan) Ryō Hirakawa	Toyota TR010 Hybrid	M	230	+12 Laps
17	Hypercar	8	(Japan) Toyota Racing	(Switzerland) Sébastien Buemi (New Zealand) Brendon Hartley (Japan) Ryō Hirakawa	Toyota H8909 3.5 L Turbo V6	M	230	+12 Laps
18	**LMGT3**	**34**	**Racing Team Turkey by TF**	**(Republic of Ireland) Peter Dempsey** **(Republic of Ireland) Charlie Eastwood** **(Turkey) Salih Yoluç**	**Chevrolet Corvette Z06 GT3.R**	G	**219**	**+23 Laps‡**
18	**LMGT3**	**34**	**Racing Team Turkey by TF**	**(Republic of Ireland) Peter Dempsey** **(Republic of Ireland) Charlie Eastwood** **(Turkey) Salih Yoluç**	**Chevrolet LT6.R 5.5 L V8**	G	**219**	**+23 Laps‡**
19	LMGT3	69	(Belgium) Team WRT	(United Kingdom) Dan Harper (United States) Anthony McIntosh (Canada) Parker Thompson	BMW M4 GT3 Evo	G	219	+23 Laps
19	LMGT3	69	(Belgium) Team WRT	(United Kingdom) Dan Harper (United States) Anthony McIntosh (Canada) Parker Thompson	BMW P58 3.0 L Turbo I6	G	219	+23 Laps
20	LMGT3	92	(Germany) The Bend Manthey	(Austria) Richard Lietz (Italy) Riccardo Pera (Australia) Yasser Shahin	Porsche 911 GT3 R (992.2)	G	218	+24 Laps
20	LMGT3	92	(Germany) The Bend Manthey	(Austria) Richard Lietz (Italy) Riccardo Pera (Australia) Yasser Shahin	Porsche M97/80 4.2 L Flat-6	G	218	+24 Laps
21	LMGT3	91	(Germany) Manthey DK Engineering	Timur Boguslavskiy (United Kingdom) James Cottingham (Turkey) Ayhancan Güven	Porsche 911 GT3 R (992.2)	G	218	+24 Laps
21	LMGT3	91	(Germany) Manthey DK Engineering	Timur Boguslavskiy (United Kingdom) James Cottingham (Turkey) Ayhancan Güven	Porsche M97/80 4.2 L Flat-6	G	218	+24 Laps
22	LMGT3	88	(Germany) Proton Competition	(Italy) Stefano Gattuso (Italy) Giammarco Levorato (United States) Logan Sargeant	Ford Mustang GT3 Evo	G	218	+24 Laps
22	LMGT3	88	(Germany) Proton Competition	(Italy) Stefano Gattuso (Italy) Giammarco Levorato (United States) Logan Sargeant	Ford Coyote 5.4 L V8	G	218	+24 Laps
23	LMGT3	61	(Italy) Iron Lynx	(Angola) Rui Andrade (Australia) Martin Berry (Belgium) Maxime Martin	Mercedes-AMG GT3 Evo	G	218	+24 Laps
23	LMGT3	61	(Italy) Iron Lynx	(Angola) Rui Andrade (Australia) Martin Berry (Belgium) Maxime Martin	Mercedes-AMG M159 6.2 L V8	G	218	+24 Laps
24	LMGT3	87	(France) Akkodis ASP Team	(Argentina) José María López (Austria) Clemens Schmid (Romania) Răzvan Umbrărescu	Lexus RC F GT3	G	218	+24 Laps
24	LMGT3	87	(France) Akkodis ASP Team	(Argentina) José María López (Austria) Clemens Schmid (Romania) Răzvan Umbrărescu	Lexus 2UR-GSE 5.4 L V8	G	218	+24 Laps
25	LMGT3	33	(United Kingdom) TF Sport	(Argentina) Nico Varrone (United Kingdom) Jonny Edgar (United States) Ben Keating	Chevrolet Corvette Z06 GT3.R	G	218	+24 Laps
25	LMGT3	33	(United Kingdom) TF Sport	(Argentina) Nico Varrone (United Kingdom) Jonny Edgar (United States) Ben Keating	Chevrolet LT6.R 5.5 L V8	G	218	+24 Laps
26	LMGT3	21	(Italy) Vista AF Corse	(France) François Hériau (United States) Simon Mann (Italy) Alessio Rovera	Ferrari 296 GT3 Evo	G	218	+24 Laps
26	LMGT3	21	(Italy) Vista AF Corse	(France) François Hériau (United States) Simon Mann (Italy) Alessio Rovera	Ferrari F163CE 3.0 L Turbo V6	G	218	+24 Laps
27	LMGT3	77	(Germany) Proton Competition	(United States) Eric Powell (United Kingdom) Sebastian Priaulx (United Kingdom) Ben Tuck	Ford Mustang GT3 Evo	G	218	+24 Laps
27	LMGT3	77	(Germany) Proton Competition	(United States) Eric Powell (United Kingdom) Sebastian Priaulx (United Kingdom) Ben Tuck	Ford Coyote 5.4 L V8	G	218	+24 Laps
28	LMGT3	58	(United Kingdom) Garage 59	(Germany) Finn Gehrsitz (Germany) Benjamin Goethe (Sweden) Alexander West	McLaren 720S GT3 Evo	G	218	+24 Laps
28	LMGT3	58	(United Kingdom) Garage 59	(Germany) Finn Gehrsitz (Germany) Benjamin Goethe (Sweden) Alexander West	McLaren M840T 4.0 L Turbo V8	G	218	+24 Laps
29	LMGT3	32	(Belgium) Team WRT	(Brazil) Augusto Farfus (Indonesia) Sean Gelael (United Kingdom) Darren Leung	BMW M4 GT3 Evo	G	218	+24 Laps
29	LMGT3	32	(Belgium) Team WRT	(Brazil) Augusto Farfus (Indonesia) Sean Gelael (United Kingdom) Darren Leung	BMW P58 3.0 L Turbo I6	G	218	+24 Laps
30	LMGT3	27	(United States) Heart of Racing Team	(Italy) Mattia Drudi (United Kingdom) Ian James (Canada) Zacharie Robichon	McLaren 720S GT3 Evo	G	217	+25 Laps
30	LMGT3	27	(United States) Heart of Racing Team	(Italy) Mattia Drudi (United Kingdom) Ian James (Canada) Zacharie Robichon	McLaren M840T 4.0 L Turbo V8	G	217	+25 Laps
31	LMGT3	78	(France) Akkodis ASP Team	(France) Hadrien David (United Kingdom) Jack Hawksworth (Belgium) Tom Van Rompuy	Lexus RC F GT3	G	217	+25 Laps
31	LMGT3	78	(France) Akkodis ASP Team	(France) Hadrien David (United Kingdom) Jack Hawksworth (Belgium) Tom Van Rompuy	Lexus 2UR-GSE 5.4 L V8	G	217	+25 Laps
32	LMGT3	79	(Italy) Iron Lynx	(Italy) Matteo Cressoni (Netherlands) Lin Hodenius (Italy) Johannes Zelger	Mercedes-AMG GT3 Evo	G	217	+25 Laps
32	LMGT3	79	(Italy) Iron Lynx	(Italy) Matteo Cressoni (Netherlands) Lin Hodenius (Italy) Johannes Zelger	Mercedes-AMG M159 6.2 L V8	G	217	+25 Laps
33	LMGT3	10	(United Kingdom) Garage 59	(Hong Kong) Antares Au (United Kingdom) Tom Fleming (Germany) Marvin Kirchhöfer	McLaren 720S GT3 Evo	G	217	+25 Laps
33	LMGT3	10	(United Kingdom) Garage 59	(Hong Kong) Antares Au (United Kingdom) Tom Fleming (Germany) Marvin Kirchhöfer	McLaren M840T 4.0 L Turbo V8	G	217	+25 Laps
34	LMGT3	54	(Italy) Vista AF Corse	(Italy) Francesco Castellacci (Switzerland) Thomas Flohr (Italy) Davide Rigon	Ferrari 296 GT3 Evo	G	217	+25 Laps
34	LMGT3	54	(Italy) Vista AF Corse	(Italy) Francesco Castellacci (Switzerland) Thomas Flohr (Italy) Davide Rigon	Ferrari F163CE 3.0 L Turbo V6	G	217	+25 Laps
35	LMGT3	23	(United States) Heart of Racing Team	(United Kingdom) Jonny Adam (Belgium) Kobe Pauwels (United States) Gray Newell	Aston Martin Vantage AMR GT3 Evo	G	216	+26 Laps
35	LMGT3	23	(United States) Heart of Racing Team	(United Kingdom) Jonny Adam (Belgium) Kobe Pauwels (United States) Gray Newell	Aston Martin M177 4.0 L Turbo V8	G	216	+26 Laps
Official results:

Notes

- **^1** The No. 20 BMW M Team WRT originally finished 6th, but was demoted to 8th after receiving a 5-second penalty after the race for making contact with the No. 50 Ferrari AF Corse.

FIA World Endurance Championship
Previous race: 24 Hours of Le Mans	2026 season	Next race: Lone Star Le Mans
