= 2026 Lone Star Le Mans =

Sports car endurance race

(United States) 2026 Lone Star Le Mans
Event information
- Round 5 of 8 in the FIA World Endurance Championship
- Date: September 6, 2026
- Location: Austin, Texas
- Venue: Circuit of the Americas
- Duration: 6 hours

Results
- Laps completed: 167
- Distance (km): 920.67
- Distance (miles): 572.14
- Hypercar

Pole position
- Time: 1:52.445
- Team: (Italy) Ferrari AF Corse
- Drivers: (United Kingdom) James Calado (Italy) Antonio Giovinazzi (Italy) Alessandro Pier Guidi

Winners
- Team: (Italy) Ferrari AF Corse
- Drivers: (Italy) Antonio Fuoco (Spain) Miguel Molina (Denmark) Nicklas Nielsen
- LMGT3

Winners
- Team: (United States) Heart of Racing Team
- Drivers: (Italy) Mattia Drudi (United Kingdom) Ian James (Canada) Zacharie Robichon

The 2026 Lone Star Le Mans was a six-hour endurance sportscar racing event, held between September 4–6, 2026 at Circuit of the Americas in Austin, Texas. It was the fifth of eight rounds of the 2026 FIA World Endurance Championship and the ninth running of the event.

== Entry list ==
The entry list was published on August 24, 2026 and consisted of 35 entries across 2 categories – 17 in Hypercar and 18 in LMGT3. In Hypercar, Ricky Taylor joined the No. 12 Cadillac Hertz Team Jota entry. In LMGT3, Eduardo Barrichello and Nicky Catsburg both return to their respective teams after missing the 6 Hours of São Paulo due to their full-season IMSA SportsCar Championship commitments.

== Schedule ==
Date	Time (local: CST)	Event
Friday, 4 September	11:30	Free Practice 1
Friday, 4 September	16:00	Free Practice 2
Saturday, 5 September	11:00	Free Practice 3
Saturday, 5 September	15:00	Qualifying – LMGT3
Saturday, 5 September	15:20	Hyperpole – LMGT3
Saturday, 5 September	15:40	Qualifying – Hypercar
Saturday, 5 September	16:00	Hyperpole – Hypercar
Sunday, 6 September	13:00	Race

== Practice ==
Three practice sessions were held before the event: two on Friday and one on Saturday. The first two sessions on Friday ran for 90 minutes, and the final session on Saturday ran for 60 minutes.

=== Practice 1 ===
Class	No.	Entrant	Driver	Time
Hypercar	51	(Italy) Ferrari AF Corse	(Italy) Antonio Giovinazzi	1:53.824
LMGT3	10	(United Kingdom) Garage 59	(United Kingdom) Tom Fleming	2:06.016

- Note: Only the fastest car in each class is shown.

=== Practice 2 ===
Class	No.	Entrant	Driver	Time
Hypercar	007	(United States) Aston Martin THOR Team	(United Kingdom) Harry Tincknell	1:52.567
LMGT3	27	(United States) Heart of Racing Team	(Canada) Zacharie Robichon	2:05.609

- Note: Only the fastest car in each class is shown.

=== Practice 3 ===
Class	No.	Entrant	Driver	Time
Hypercar	007	(United States) Aston Martin THOR Team	(United Kingdom) Harry Tincknell	1:52.174
LMGT3	21	(Italy) Vista AF Corse	(United States) Simon Mann	2:05.731

- Note: Only the fastest car in each class is shown.

== Qualifying ==
Qualifying started at 15:00 CST on Saturday, with one twelve-minute qualifying session and one ten-minute hyperpole session per class, resulting in two qualifying and two hyperpole sessions in total.

=== Qualifying results ===
Pole position winners in each class are marked in bold.

Pos	Class	No.	Entrant	Qualifying	Hyperpole	Grid
1	**Hypercar**	**51**	**(Italy) Ferrari AF Corse**	**1:52.105**	**1:52.445**	1
2	Hypercar	38	(United States) Cadillac Hertz Team Jota	1:52.598	1:52.445	2
3	Hypercar	35	(France) Alpine Endurance Team	1:52.552	1:52.474	3
4	Hypercar	007	(United States) Aston Martin THOR Team	1:52.663	1:52.495	4
5	Hypercar	50	(Italy) Ferrari AF Corse	1:52.020	1:52.873	5
6	Hypercar	36	(France) Alpine Endurance Team	1:52.074	1:52.886	7
7	Hypercar	8	(Japan) Toyota Racing	1:52.671	1:52.985	6
8	Hypercar	17	(South Korea) Genesis Magma Racing	1:52.735	1:53.006	8
9	Hypercar	7	(Japan) Toyota Racing	1:52.729	1:53.293	9
10	Hypercar	19	(South Korea) Genesis Magma Racing	1:52.457	1:53.495	10
11	Hypercar	15	(Germany) BMW M Team WRT	1:52.841		11
12	Hypercar	94	(France) Peugeot TotalEnergies	1:52.947		12
13	Hypercar	20	(Germany) BMW M Team WRT	1:52.998		13
14	Hypercar	83	(Italy) Ferrari AF Corse	1:53.043		14
15	Hypercar	12	(United States) Cadillac Hertz Team Jota	1:53.080		15
16	Hypercar	93	(France) Peugeot TotalEnergies	1:53.220		17
17	Hypercar	009	(United States) Aston Martin THOR Team	1:53.507		16
18	**LMGT3**	**23**	**(United States) Heart of Racing Team**	**2:07.148**	**2:05.160**	18
19	LMGT3	27	(United States) Heart of Racing Team	2:06.805	2:05.284	19
20	LMGT3	91	(Germany) Manthey DK Engineering	2:06.789	2:05.483	20
21	LMGT3	77	(Germany) Proton Competition	2:06.877	2:05.483	21
22	LMGT3	58	(United Kingdom) Garage 59	2:06.739	2:05.654	22
23	LMGT3	21	(Italy) Vista AF Corse	2:06.826	2:05.765	25
24	LMGT3	32	(Belgium) Team WRT	2:07.068	2:05.888	23
25	LMGT3	61	(Italy) Iron Lynx	2:06.714	2:05.969	24
26	LMGT3	87	(France) Akkodis ASP Team	2:07.095	2:06.265	26
27	LMGT3	88	(Germany) Proton Competition	2:06.331	2:09.196	27
28	LMGT3	54	(Italy) Vista AF Corse	2:07.262		28
29	LMGT3	34	Racing Team Turkey by TF	2:07.443		29
30	LMGT3	92	(Germany) The Bend Manthey	2:07.479		30
31	LMGT3	10	(United Kingdom) Garage 59	2:07.559		31
32	LMGT3	78	(France) Akkodis ASP Team	2:07.622		32
33	LMGT3	69	(Belgium) Team WRT	2:08.128		33
34	LMGT3	33	(United Kingdom) TF Sport	2:08.864		34
35	LMGT3	79	(Italy) Iron Lynx	2:08.968		35

== Race ==
The race started at 13:00 CST on Sunday, and ran for six hours.

=== Race results ===
Class winners are in bold and ‡.

Pos	Class	No.	Team	Drivers	Chassis	Tyre	Laps	Time/Reason
Pos	Class	No.	Team	Drivers	Engine	Tyre	Laps	Time/Reason
1	**Hypercar**	**50**	**(Italy) Ferrari AF Corse**	**(Italy) Antonio Fuoco** **(Spain) Miguel Molina** **(Denmark) Nicklas Nielsen**	**Ferrari 499P**	M	**167**	**6:00:07.219‡**
1	**Hypercar**	**50**	**(Italy) Ferrari AF Corse**	**(Italy) Antonio Fuoco** **(Spain) Miguel Molina** **(Denmark) Nicklas Nielsen**	**Ferrari F163CG 3.0 L Turbo V6**	M	**167**	**6:00:07.219‡**
2	Hypercar	38	(United States) Cadillac Hertz Team Jota	(United Kingdom) Jack Aitken (New Zealand) Earl Bamber (France) Sébastien Bourdais	Cadillac V-Series.R	M	167	+4.471
2	Hypercar	38	(United States) Cadillac Hertz Team Jota	(United Kingdom) Jack Aitken (New Zealand) Earl Bamber (France) Sébastien Bourdais	Cadillac LMC55R 5.5 L V8	M	167	+4.471
3	Hypercar	35	(France) Alpine Endurance Team	(Portugal) António Félix da Costa (Austria) Ferdinand Habsburg (France) Charles Milesi	Alpine A424	M	167	+6.116
3	Hypercar	35	(France) Alpine Endurance Team	(Portugal) António Félix da Costa (Austria) Ferdinand Habsburg (France) Charles Milesi	Alpine V634 3.4 L Turbo V6	M	167	+6.116
4	Hypercar	007	(United States) Aston Martin THOR Team	(United Kingdom) Tom Gamble (United Kingdom) Harry Tincknell	Aston Martin Valkyrie	M	167	+9.045
4	Hypercar	007	(United States) Aston Martin THOR Team	(United Kingdom) Tom Gamble (United Kingdom) Harry Tincknell	Aston Martin RA 6.5 L V12	M	167	+9.045
5	Hypercar	36	(France) Alpine Endurance Team	(France) Jules Gounon (France) Frédéric Makowiecki (France) Victor Martins	Alpine A424	M	167	+10.885
5	Hypercar	36	(France) Alpine Endurance Team	(France) Jules Gounon (France) Frédéric Makowiecki (France) Victor Martins	Alpine V634 3.4 L Turbo V6	M	167	+10.885
6	Hypercar	8	(Japan) Toyota Racing	(Switzerland) Sébastien Buemi (New Zealand) Brendon Hartley (Japan) Ryō Hirakawa	Toyota TR010 Hybrid	M	167	+21.389
6	Hypercar	8	(Japan) Toyota Racing	(Switzerland) Sébastien Buemi (New Zealand) Brendon Hartley (Japan) Ryō Hirakawa	Toyota H8909 3.5 L Turbo V6	M	167	+21.389
7	Hypercar	17	(South Korea) Genesis Magma Racing	(Brazil) Pipo Derani (France) Mathys Jaubert (Germany) André Lotterer	Genesis GMR-001	M	167	+35.975
7	Hypercar	17	(South Korea) Genesis Magma Racing	(Brazil) Pipo Derani (France) Mathys Jaubert (Germany) André Lotterer	Genesis G8MR 3.2 L Turbo V8	M	167	+35.975
8	Hypercar	15	(Germany) BMW M Team WRT	(Denmark) Kevin Magnussen (Switzerland) Raffaele Marciello (Belgium) Dries Vanthoor	BMW M Hybrid V8	M	167	+37.470
8	Hypercar	15	(Germany) BMW M Team WRT	(Denmark) Kevin Magnussen (Switzerland) Raffaele Marciello (Belgium) Dries Vanthoor	BMW P66/3 4.0 L Turbo V8	M	167	+37.470
9	Hypercar	12	(United States) Cadillac Hertz Team Jota	(France) Norman Nato (United Kingdom) Will Stevens (United States) Ricky Taylor	Cadillac V-Series.R	M	167	+39.631
9	Hypercar	12	(United States) Cadillac Hertz Team Jota	(France) Norman Nato (United Kingdom) Will Stevens (United States) Ricky Taylor	Cadillac LMC55R 5.5 L V8	M	167	+39.631
10	Hypercar	94	(France) Peugeot TotalEnergies	(France) Loïc Duval (Denmark) Malthe Jakobsen (France) Théo Pourchaire	Peugeot 9X8	M	167	+40.000
10	Hypercar	94	(France) Peugeot TotalEnergies	(France) Loïc Duval (Denmark) Malthe Jakobsen (France) Théo Pourchaire	Peugeot X6H 2.6 L Turbo V6	M	167	+40.000
11	Hypercar	51	(Italy) Ferrari AF Corse	(United Kingdom) James Calado (Italy) Antonio Giovinazzi (Italy) Alessandro Pier Guidi	Ferrari 499P	M	167	+40.739
11	Hypercar	51	(Italy) Ferrari AF Corse	(United Kingdom) James Calado (Italy) Antonio Giovinazzi (Italy) Alessandro Pier Guidi	Ferrari F163CG 3.0 L Turbo V6	M	167	+40.739
12	Hypercar	20	(Germany) BMW M Team WRT	(Netherlands) Robin Frijns (Germany) René Rast (South Africa) Sheldon van der Linde	BMW M Hybrid V8	M	167	+41.840
12	Hypercar	20	(Germany) BMW M Team WRT	(Netherlands) Robin Frijns (Germany) René Rast (South Africa) Sheldon van der Linde	BMW P66/3 4.0 L Turbo V8	M	167	+41.840
13	Hypercar	83	(Italy) AF Corse	(United Kingdom) Phil Hanson (Poland) Robert Kubica (China) Yifei Ye	Ferrari 499P	M	167	+44.830
13	Hypercar	83	(Italy) AF Corse	(United Kingdom) Phil Hanson (Poland) Robert Kubica (China) Yifei Ye	Ferrari F163CG 3.0 L Turbo V6	M	167	+44.830
14	Hypercar	009	(United States) Aston Martin THOR Team	(Spain) Alex Riberas (Denmark) Marco Sørensen	Aston Martin Valkyrie	M	167	+45.703
14	Hypercar	009	(United States) Aston Martin THOR Team	(Spain) Alex Riberas (Denmark) Marco Sørensen	Aston Martin RA 6.5 L V12	M	167	+45.703
15	Hypercar	19	(South Korea) Genesis Magma Racing	(France) Paul-Loup Chatin (France) Mathieu Jaminet (Spain) Daniel Juncadella	Genesis GMR-001	M	167	+1:45.214
15	Hypercar	19	(South Korea) Genesis Magma Racing	(France) Paul-Loup Chatin (France) Mathieu Jaminet (Spain) Daniel Juncadella	Genesis G8MR 3.2 L Turbo V8	M	167	+1:45.214
16	Hypercar	93	(France) Peugeot TotalEnergies	(New Zealand) Nick Cassidy (United Kingdom) Paul di Resta (Belgium) Stoffel Vandoorne	Peugeot 9X8	M	165	+2 Laps
16	Hypercar	93	(France) Peugeot TotalEnergies	(New Zealand) Nick Cassidy (United Kingdom) Paul di Resta (Belgium) Stoffel Vandoorne	Peugeot X6H 2.6 L Turbo V6	M	165	+2 Laps
17	Hypercar	7	(Japan) Toyota Racing	(United Kingdom) Mike Conway (Japan) Kamui Kobayashi (Netherlands) Nyck de Vries	Toyota TR010 Hybrid	M	161	+6 Laps
17	Hypercar	7	(Japan) Toyota Racing	(United Kingdom) Mike Conway (Japan) Kamui Kobayashi (Netherlands) Nyck de Vries	Toyota H8909 3.5 L Turbo V6	M	161	+6 Laps
18	**LMGT3**	**27**	**(United States) Heart of Racing Team**	**(Italy) Mattia Drudi** **(United Kingdom) Ian James** **(Canada) Zacharie Robichon**	Aston Martin Vantage AMR GT3 Evo	G	**154**	**+13 Laps‡**
18	**LMGT3**	**27**	**(United States) Heart of Racing Team**	**(Italy) Mattia Drudi** **(United Kingdom) Ian James** **(Canada) Zacharie Robichon**	Aston Martin M177 4.0 L Turbo V8	G	**154**	**+13 Laps‡**
19	LMGT3	91	(Germany) Manthey DK Engineering	Timur Boguslavskiy (United Kingdom) James Cottingham (Turkey) Ayhancan Güven	Porsche 911 GT3 R (992.2)	G	154	+13 Laps
19	LMGT3	91	(Germany) Manthey DK Engineering	Timur Boguslavskiy (United Kingdom) James Cottingham (Turkey) Ayhancan Güven	Porsche M97/80 4.2 L Flat-6	G	154	+13 Laps
20	LMGT3	23	(United States) Heart of Racing Team	(United Kingdom) Jonny Adam (Belgium) Kobe Pauwels (United States) Gray Newell	Aston Martin Vantage AMR GT3 Evo	G	154	+13 Laps
20	LMGT3	23	(United States) Heart of Racing Team	(United Kingdom) Jonny Adam (Belgium) Kobe Pauwels (United States) Gray Newell	Aston Martin M177 4.0 L Turbo V8	G	154	+13 Laps
21	LMGT3	21	(Italy) Vista AF Corse	(France) François Hériau (United States) Simon Mann (Italy) Alessio Rovera	Ferrari 296 GT3 Evo	G	154	+13 Laps
21	LMGT3	21	(Italy) Vista AF Corse	(France) François Hériau (United States) Simon Mann (Italy) Alessio Rovera	Ferrari F163CE 3.0 L Turbo V6	G	154	+13 Laps
22	LMGT3	77	(Germany) Proton Competition	(United States) Eric Powell (United Kingdom) Sebastian Priaulx (United Kingdom) Ben Tuck	Ford Mustang GT3 Evo	G	154	+13 Laps
22	LMGT3	77	(Germany) Proton Competition	(United States) Eric Powell (United Kingdom) Sebastian Priaulx (United Kingdom) Ben Tuck	Ford Coyote 5.4 L V8	G	154	+13 Laps
23	LMGT3	61	(Italy) Iron Lynx	(Angola) Rui Andrade (Australia) Martin Berry (Belgium) Maxime Martin	Mercedes-AMG GT3 Evo	G	154	+13 Laps
23	LMGT3	61	(Italy) Iron Lynx	(Angola) Rui Andrade (Australia) Martin Berry (Belgium) Maxime Martin	Mercedes-AMG M159 6.2 L V8	G	154	+13 Laps
24	LMGT3	79	(Italy) Iron Lynx	(Italy) Matteo Cressoni (Netherlands) Lin Hodenius (Italy) Johannes Zelger	Mercedes-AMG GT3 Evo	G	154	+13 Laps
24	LMGT3	79	(Italy) Iron Lynx	(Italy) Matteo Cressoni (Netherlands) Lin Hodenius (Italy) Johannes Zelger	Mercedes-AMG M159 6.2 L V8	G	154	+13 Laps
25	LMGT3	58	(United Kingdom) Garage 59	(Germany) Finn Gehrsitz (Germany) Benjamin Goethe (Sweden) Alexander West	McLaren 720S GT3 Evo	G	154	+13 Laps
25	LMGT3	58	(United Kingdom) Garage 59	(Germany) Finn Gehrsitz (Germany) Benjamin Goethe (Sweden) Alexander West	McLaren M840T 4.0 L Turbo V8	G	154	+13 Laps
26	LMGT3	88	(Germany) Proton Competition	(Italy) Stefano Gattuso (Italy) Giammarco Levorato (United States) Logan Sargeant	Ford Mustang GT3 Evo	G	153	+14 Laps
26	LMGT3	88	(Germany) Proton Competition	(Italy) Stefano Gattuso (Italy) Giammarco Levorato (United States) Logan Sargeant	Ford Coyote 5.4 L V8	G	153	+14 Laps
27	LMGT3	54	(Italy) Vista AF Corse	(Italy) Francesco Castellacci (Switzerland) Thomas Flohr (Italy) Davide Rigon	Ferrari 296 GT3 Evo	G	153	+14 Laps
27	LMGT3	54	(Italy) Vista AF Corse	(Italy) Francesco Castellacci (Switzerland) Thomas Flohr (Italy) Davide Rigon	Ferrari F163CE 3.0 L Turbo V6	G	153	+14 Laps
28	LMGT3	69	(Belgium) Team WRT	(United Kingdom) Dan Harper (United States) Anthony McIntosh (Canada) Parker Thompson	BMW M4 GT3 Evo	G	153	+14 Laps
28	LMGT3	69	(Belgium) Team WRT	(United Kingdom) Dan Harper (United States) Anthony McIntosh (Canada) Parker Thompson	BMW P58 3.0 L Turbo I6	G	153	+14 Laps
29	LMGT3	33	(United Kingdom) TF Sport	(Argentina) Nico Varrone (United Kingdom) Jonny Edgar (United States) Ben Keating	Chevrolet Corvette Z06 GT3.R	G	153	+14 Laps
29	LMGT3	33	(United Kingdom) TF Sport	(Argentina) Nico Varrone (United Kingdom) Jonny Edgar (United States) Ben Keating	Chevrolet LT6.R 5.5 L V8	G	153	+14 Laps
30	LMGT3	87	(France) Akkodis ASP Team	(Argentina) José María López (Austria) Clemens Schmid (Romania) Răzvan Umbrărescu	Lexus RC F GT3	G	153	+14 Laps
30	LMGT3	87	(France) Akkodis ASP Team	(Argentina) José María López (Austria) Clemens Schmid (Romania) Răzvan Umbrărescu	Lexus 2UR-GSE 5.4 L V8	G	153	+14 Laps
31	LMGT3	34	Racing Team Turkey by TF	(Republic of Ireland) Peter Dempsey (Republic of Ireland) Charlie Eastwood (Turkey) Salih Yoluç	Chevrolet Corvette Z06 GT3.R	G	151	+16 Laps
31	LMGT3	34	Racing Team Turkey by TF	(Republic of Ireland) Peter Dempsey (Republic of Ireland) Charlie Eastwood (Turkey) Salih Yoluç	Chevrolet LT6.R 5.5 L V8	G	151	+16 Laps
32	LMGT3	92	(Germany) The Bend Manthey	(Austria) Richard Lietz (Italy) Riccardo Pera (Australia) Yasser Shahin	Porsche 911 GT3 R (992.2)	G	147	+20 Laps
32	LMGT3	92	(Germany) The Bend Manthey	(Austria) Richard Lietz (Italy) Riccardo Pera (Australia) Yasser Shahin	Porsche M97/80 4.2 L Flat-6	G	147	+20 Laps
33	LMGT3	32	(Belgium) Team WRT	(Brazil) Augusto Farfus (Indonesia) Sean Gelael (United Kingdom) Darren Leung	BMW M4 GT3 Evo	G	142	+25 Laps
33	LMGT3	32	(Belgium) Team WRT	(Brazil) Augusto Farfus (Indonesia) Sean Gelael (United Kingdom) Darren Leung	BMW P58 3.0 L Turbo I6	G	142	+25 Laps
34	LMGT3	10	(United Kingdom) Garage 59	(Hong Kong) Antares Au (United Kingdom) Tom Fleming (Germany) Marvin Kirchhöfer	McLaren 720S GT3 Evo	G	140	+27 Laps
34	LMGT3	10	(United Kingdom) Garage 59	(Hong Kong) Antares Au (United Kingdom) Tom Fleming (Germany) Marvin Kirchhöfer	McLaren M840T 4.0 L Turbo V8	G	140	+27 Laps
35	LMGT3	78	(France) Akkodis ASP Team	(France) Hadrien David (United Kingdom) Jack Hawksworth (Belgium) Tom Van Rompuy	Lexus RC F GT3	G	122	+45 Laps
35	LMGT3	78	(France) Akkodis ASP Team	(France) Hadrien David (United Kingdom) Jack Hawksworth (Belgium) Tom Van Rompuy	Lexus 2UR-GSE 5.4 L V8	G	122	+45 Laps

FIA World Endurance Championship
Previous race: 6 Hours of São Paulo	2026 season	Next race: 6 Hours of Fuji
