= 2026 6 Hours of Fuji =

Sports car endurance race

(Japan) 2026 6 Hours of Fuji
Event information
- Round 6 of 8 in the 2026 FIA World Endurance Championship
- Date: 27 September 2026
- Location: Oyama, Shizuoka
- Venue: Fuji Speedway
- Duration: 6 hours

Results
- Laps completed: 203
- Distance (km): 926.29
- Distance (miles): 575.51
- Hypercar

Pole position
- Team: (France) Alpine Endurance Team
- Drivers: (France) Jules Gounon (France) Victor Martins

Winners
- Team: (Japan) Toyota Racing
- Drivers: (Switzerland) Sébastien Buemi (New Zealand) Brendon Hartley (Japan) Ryō Hirakawa
- LMGT3

Winners
- Team: (Belgium) Team WRT
- Drivers: (Brazil) Augusto Farfus (Indonesia) Sean Gelael (United Kingdom) Darren Leung

The 2026 6 Hours of Fuji was an endurance sportscar racing event held on 27 September 2026, as the sixth of eight rounds of the 2026 FIA World Endurance Championship. It was the thirteenth running of the event in its current format in the World Endurance Championship.

== Entry list ==
The entry list consisted of 35 cars, with 17 in Hypercar and 18 in LMGT3.

== Schedule ==
Date	Time (local: JST)	Event
Friday, 25 September	10:15	Free Practice 1
Friday, 25 September	14:30	Free Practice 2
Saturday, 26 September	09:30	Free Practice 3
Saturday, 26 September	14:00	Qualifying - LMGT3
Saturday, 26 September	14:20	Hyperpole - LMGT3
Saturday, 26 September	15:00	Qualifying - Hypercar
Saturday, 26 September	15:30	Hyperpole - Hypercar
Sunday, 27 September	11:00	Race

== Practice ==
Three practice sessions were held: two were held on Friday, and one was held on Saturday. The sessions on Friday morning and Friday afternoon lasted 90 minutes, while the Saturday session 60 minutes.

=== Practice 1 ===
Class	No.	Entrant	Driver	Time
Hypercar	8	(Japan) Toyota Racing	(Japan) Ryō Hirakawa	1:29.694
LMGT3	58	(United Kingdom) Garage 59	(Germany) Finn Gehrsitz	1:40.214

- Note: Only the fastest car in each class is shown.

=== Practice 2 ===
Class	No.	Entrant	Driver	Time
Hypercar	93	(France) Peugeot TotalEnergies	(Denmark) Mikkel Jensen	1:29.495
LMGT3	87	(France) Akkodis ASP Team	(Austria) Clemens Schmid	1:41.431

- Note: Only the fastest car in each class is shown.

=== Practice 3 ===
Class	No.	Entrant	Driver	Time
Hypercar	36	(France) Alpine Endurance Team	(France) Victor Martins	1:40.594
LMGT3	34	Racing Team Turkey by TF	(Republic of Ireland) Charlie Eastwood	1:51.232

- Note: Only the fastest car in each class is shown.

== Qualifying ==
Qualifying was scheduled to start at 14:00 JST on Saturday, with one twelve-minute qualifying session and one ten-minute hyperpole session per class, resulting in two qualifying and two hyperpole sessions in total. Qualifying was cancelled due to adverse weather conditions and the grid was established based on the best times across all three practice sessions.

== Race ==
The race started at 11:00 JST on Sunday, and ran for six hours.

=== Race results ===
Class winners are in bold and ‡.

Pos	Class	No.	Team	Drivers	Chassis	Tyre	Laps	Time/Reason
Pos	Class	No.	Team	Drivers	Engine	Tyre	Laps	Time/Reason
1	**Hypercar**	**8**	**(Japan) Toyota Racing**	**(Switzerland) Sébastien Buemi** **(New Zealand) Brendon Hartley** **(Japan) Ryō Hirakawa**	**Toyota TR010 Hybrid**	M	**203**	**6:01:01.299‡**
1	**Hypercar**	**8**	**(Japan) Toyota Racing**	**(Switzerland) Sébastien Buemi** **(New Zealand) Brendon Hartley** **(Japan) Ryō Hirakawa**	**Toyota H8909 3.5 L Turbo V6**	M	**203**	**6:01:01.299‡**
2	Hypercar	36	(France) Alpine Endurance Team	(France) Jules Gounon (France) Victor Martins	Alpine A424	M	203	+0.591
2	Hypercar	36	(France) Alpine Endurance Team	(France) Jules Gounon (France) Victor Martins	Alpine V634 3.4 L Turbo V6	M	203	+0.591
3	Hypercar	15	(Germany) BMW M Team WRT	(Denmark) Kevin Magnussen (Switzerland) Raffaele Marciello (Belgium) Dries Vanthoor	BMW M Hybrid V8	M	203	+6.415
3	Hypercar	15	(Germany) BMW M Team WRT	(Denmark) Kevin Magnussen (Switzerland) Raffaele Marciello (Belgium) Dries Vanthoor	BMW P66/3 4.0 L Turbo V8	M	203	+6.415
4	Hypercar	35	(France) Alpine Endurance Team	(Austria) Ferdinand Habsburg (France) Charles Milesi	Alpine A424	M	203	+7.699
4	Hypercar	35	(France) Alpine Endurance Team	(Austria) Ferdinand Habsburg (France) Charles Milesi	Alpine V634 3.4 L Turbo V6	M	203	+7.699
5	Hypercar	38	(United States) Cadillac Hertz Team Jota	(United Kingdom) Jack Aitken (New Zealand) Earl Bamber (France) Sébastien Bourdais	Cadillac V-Series.R	M	203	+8.142
5	Hypercar	38	(United States) Cadillac Hertz Team Jota	(United Kingdom) Jack Aitken (New Zealand) Earl Bamber (France) Sébastien Bourdais	Cadillac LMC55R 5.5 L V8	M	203	+8.142
6	Hypercar	94	(France) Peugeot TotalEnergies	(France) Loïc Duval (Denmark) Malthe Jakobsen (France) Théo Pourchaire	Peugeot 9X8	M	203	+10.176
6	Hypercar	94	(France) Peugeot TotalEnergies	(France) Loïc Duval (Denmark) Malthe Jakobsen (France) Théo Pourchaire	Peugeot X6H 2.6 L Turbo V6	M	203	+10.176
7	Hypercar	12	(United States) Cadillac Hertz Team Jota	(France) Norman Nato (United Kingdom) Will Stevens	Cadillac V-Series.R	M	203	+13.497
7	Hypercar	12	(United States) Cadillac Hertz Team Jota	(France) Norman Nato (United Kingdom) Will Stevens	Cadillac LMC55R 5.5 L V8	M	203	+13.497
8	Hypercar	7	(Japan) Toyota Racing	(United Kingdom) Mike Conway (Japan) Kamui Kobayashi (Netherlands) Nyck de Vries	Toyota TR010 Hybrid	M	203	+14.206
8	Hypercar	7	(Japan) Toyota Racing	(United Kingdom) Mike Conway (Japan) Kamui Kobayashi (Netherlands) Nyck de Vries	Toyota H8909 3.5 L Turbo V6	M	203	+14.206
9	Hypercar	009	(United States) Aston Martin THOR Team	(Spain) Alex Riberas (Denmark) Marco Sørensen	Aston Martin Valkyrie	M	203	+24.237
9	Hypercar	009	(United States) Aston Martin THOR Team	(Spain) Alex Riberas (Denmark) Marco Sørensen	Aston Martin RA 6.5 L V12	M	203	+24.237
10	Hypercar	51	(Italy) Ferrari AF Corse	(United Kingdom) James Calado (Italy) Antonio Giovinazzi (Italy) Alessandro Pier Guidi	Ferrari 499P	M	203	+26.443
10	Hypercar	51	(Italy) Ferrari AF Corse	(United Kingdom) James Calado (Italy) Antonio Giovinazzi (Italy) Alessandro Pier Guidi	Ferrari F163CG 3.0 L Turbo V6	M	203	+26.443
11	Hypercar	19	(South Korea) Genesis Magma Racing	(France) Paul-Loup Chatin (France) Mathieu Jaminet (Spain) Daniel Juncadella	Genesis GMR-001	M	203	+45.525
11	Hypercar	19	(South Korea) Genesis Magma Racing	(France) Paul-Loup Chatin (France) Mathieu Jaminet (Spain) Daniel Juncadella	Genesis G8MR 3.2 L Turbo V8	M	203	+45.525
12	Hypercar	83	(Italy) AF Corse	(United Kingdom) Phil Hanson (Poland) Robert Kubica (China) Yifei Ye	Ferrari 499P	M	202	+1 Lap
12	Hypercar	83	(Italy) AF Corse	(United Kingdom) Phil Hanson (Poland) Robert Kubica (China) Yifei Ye	Ferrari F163CG 3.0 L Turbo V6	M	202	+1 Lap
13	Hypercar	20	(Germany) BMW M Team WRT	(Netherlands) Robin Frijns (Germany) René Rast (South Africa) Sheldon van der Linde	BMW M Hybrid V8	M	202	+1 Lap
13	Hypercar	20	(Germany) BMW M Team WRT	(Netherlands) Robin Frijns (Germany) René Rast (South Africa) Sheldon van der Linde	BMW P66/3 4.0 L Turbo V8	M	202	+1 Lap
14	Hypercar	007	(United States) Aston Martin THOR Team	(United Kingdom) Tom Gamble (United Kingdom) Harry Tincknell	Aston Martin Valkyrie	M	202	+1 Lap
14	Hypercar	007	(United States) Aston Martin THOR Team	(United Kingdom) Tom Gamble (United Kingdom) Harry Tincknell	Aston Martin RA 6.5 L V12	M	202	+1 Lap
15	Hypercar	17	(South Korea) Genesis Magma Racing	(Brazil) Pipo Derani (France) Mathys Jaubert (Germany) André Lotterer	Genesis GMR-001	M	202	+1 Lap
15	Hypercar	17	(South Korea) Genesis Magma Racing	(Brazil) Pipo Derani (France) Mathys Jaubert (Germany) André Lotterer	Genesis G8MR 3.2 L Turbo V8	M	202	+1 Lap
16	**LMGT3**	**32**	**(Belgium) Team WRT**	**(Brazil) Augusto Farfus** **(Indonesia) Sean Gelael** **(United Kingdom) Darren Leung**	**BMW M4 GT3 Evo**	G	**187**	**+16 Laps‡**
16	**LMGT3**	**32**	**(Belgium) Team WRT**	**(Brazil) Augusto Farfus** **(Indonesia) Sean Gelael** **(United Kingdom) Darren Leung**	**BMW P58 3.0 L Turbo I6**	G	**187**	**+16 Laps‡**
17	LMGT3	27	(United States) Heart of Racing Team	(Italy) Mattia Drudi (United Kingdom) Ian James (Canada) Zacharie Robichon	McLaren 720S GT3 Evo	G	187	+16 Laps
17	LMGT3	27	(United States) Heart of Racing Team	(Italy) Mattia Drudi (United Kingdom) Ian James (Canada) Zacharie Robichon	McLaren M840T 4.0 L Turbo V8	G	187	+16 Laps
18	LMGT3	34	Racing Team Turkey by TF	(Republic of Ireland) Peter Dempsey (Republic of Ireland) Charlie Eastwood (Turkey) Salih Yoluç	Chevrolet Corvette Z06 GT3.R	G	187	+16 Laps
18	LMGT3	34	Racing Team Turkey by TF	(Republic of Ireland) Peter Dempsey (Republic of Ireland) Charlie Eastwood (Turkey) Salih Yoluç	Chevrolet LT6.R 5.5 L V8	G	187	+16 Laps
19	LMGT3	54	(Italy) Vista AF Corse	(Italy) Francesco Castellacci (Switzerland) Thomas Flohr (Italy) Davide Rigon	Ferrari 296 GT3 Evo	G	187	+16 Laps
19	LMGT3	54	(Italy) Vista AF Corse	(Italy) Francesco Castellacci (Switzerland) Thomas Flohr (Italy) Davide Rigon	Ferrari F163CE 3.0 L Turbo V6	G	187	+16 Laps
20	LMGT3	33	(United Kingdom) TF Sport	(United Kingdom) Jonny Edgar (Netherlands) Nicky Catsburg (United States) Ben Keating	Chevrolet Corvette Z06 GT3.R	G	187	+16 Laps
20	LMGT3	33	(United Kingdom) TF Sport	(United Kingdom) Jonny Edgar (Netherlands) Nicky Catsburg (United States) Ben Keating	Chevrolet LT6.R 5.5 L V8	G	187	+16 Laps
21	LMGT3	69	(Belgium) Team WRT	(United Kingdom) Dan Harper (United States) Anthony McIntosh (Canada) Parker Thompson	BMW M4 GT3 Evo	G	187	+16 Laps
21	LMGT3	69	(Belgium) Team WRT	(United Kingdom) Dan Harper (United States) Anthony McIntosh (Canada) Parker Thompson	BMW P58 3.0 L Turbo I6	G	187	+16 Laps
22	LMGT3	91	(Germany) Manthey DK Engineering	Timur Boguslavskiy (United Kingdom) James Cottingham (Turkey) Ayhancan Güven	Porsche 911 GT3 R (992.2)	G	187	+16 Laps
22	LMGT3	91	(Germany) Manthey DK Engineering	Timur Boguslavskiy (United Kingdom) James Cottingham (Turkey) Ayhancan Güven	Porsche M97/80 4.2 L Flat-6	G	187	+16 Laps
23	LMGT3	10	(United Kingdom) Garage 59	(Hong Kong) Antares Au (United Kingdom) Tom Fleming (Germany) Marvin Kirchhöfer	McLaren 720S GT3 Evo	G	187	+16 Laps
23	LMGT3	10	(United Kingdom) Garage 59	(Hong Kong) Antares Au (United Kingdom) Tom Fleming (Germany) Marvin Kirchhöfer	McLaren M840T 4.0 L Turbo V8	G	187	+16 Laps
24	LMGT3	78	(France) Akkodis ASP Team	(France) Hadrien David (France) Esteban Masson (Belgium) Tom Van Rompuy	Lexus RC F GT3	G	187	+16 Laps
24	LMGT3	78	(France) Akkodis ASP Team	(France) Hadrien David (France) Esteban Masson (Belgium) Tom Van Rompuy	Lexus 2UR-GSE 5.4 L V8	G	187	+16 Laps
25	LMGT3	77	(Germany) Proton Competition	(United States) Eric Powell (United Kingdom) Sebastian Priaulx (United Kingdom) Ben Tuck	Ford Mustang GT3 Evo	G	187	+16 Laps
25	LMGT3	77	(Germany) Proton Competition	(United States) Eric Powell (United Kingdom) Sebastian Priaulx (United Kingdom) Ben Tuck	Ford Coyote 5.4 L V8	G	187	+16 Laps
26	LMGT3	87	(France) Akkodis ASP Team	(Argentina) José María López (Austria) Clemens Schmid (Romania) Răzvan Umbrărescu	Lexus RC F GT3	G	185	+18 Laps
26	LMGT3	87	(France) Akkodis ASP Team	(Argentina) José María López (Austria) Clemens Schmid (Romania) Răzvan Umbrărescu	Lexus 2UR-GSE 5.4 L V8	G	185	+18 Laps
27	LMGT3	92	(Germany) The Bend Manthey	(Austria) Richard Lietz (Italy) Riccardo Pera (Australia) Yasser Shahin	Porsche 911 GT3 R (992.2)	G	181	+22 Laps
27	LMGT3	92	(Germany) The Bend Manthey	(Austria) Richard Lietz (Italy) Riccardo Pera (Australia) Yasser Shahin	Porsche M97/80 4.2 L Flat-6	G	181	+22 Laps
28	LMGT3	79	(Italy) Iron Lynx	(Italy) Matteo Cressoni (Netherlands) Lin Hodenius (Italy) Johannes Zelger	Mercedes-AMG GT3 Evo	G	178	+25 Laps
28	LMGT3	79	(Italy) Iron Lynx	(Italy) Matteo Cressoni (Netherlands) Lin Hodenius (Italy) Johannes Zelger	Mercedes-AMG M159 6.2 L V8	G	178	+25 Laps
DNF	LMGT3	21	(Italy) Vista AF Corse	(France) François Hériau (United States) Simon Mann (Italy) Alessio Rovera	Ferrari 296 GT3 Evo	G	184	Did not finish
DNF	LMGT3	21	(Italy) Vista AF Corse	(France) François Hériau (United States) Simon Mann (Italy) Alessio Rovera	Ferrari F163CE 3.0 L Turbo V6	G	184	Did not finish
DNF	LMGT3	58	(United Kingdom) Garage 59	(Germany) Finn Gehrsitz (Germany) Benjamin Goethe (Sweden) Alexander West	McLaren 720S GT3 Evo	G	160	Crash
DNF	LMGT3	58	(United Kingdom) Garage 59	(Germany) Finn Gehrsitz (Germany) Benjamin Goethe (Sweden) Alexander West	McLaren M840T 4.0 L Turbo V8	G	160	Crash
DNF	Hypercar	50	(Italy) Ferrari AF Corse	(Italy) Antonio Fuoco (Spain) Miguel Molina (Denmark) Nicklas Nielsen	Ferrari 499P	M	145	Power
DNF	Hypercar	50	(Italy) Ferrari AF Corse	(Italy) Antonio Fuoco (Spain) Miguel Molina (Denmark) Nicklas Nielsen	Ferrari F163CG 3.0 L Turbo V6	M	145	Power
DNF	Hypercar	93	(France) Peugeot TotalEnergies	(New Zealand) Nick Cassidy (United Kingdom) Paul di Resta (Belgium) Stoffel Vandoorne	Peugeot 9X8	M	67	Mechanical
DNF	Hypercar	93	(France) Peugeot TotalEnergies	(New Zealand) Nick Cassidy (United Kingdom) Paul di Resta (Belgium) Stoffel Vandoorne	Peugeot X6H 2.6 L Turbo V6	M	67	Mechanical
DNF	LMGT3	23	(United States) Heart of Racing Team	(United Kingdom) Jonny Adam (Brazil) Eduardo Barrichello (United States) Gray Newell	Aston Martin Vantage AMR GT3 Evo	G	37	Contact
DNF	LMGT3	23	(United States) Heart of Racing Team	(United Kingdom) Jonny Adam (Brazil) Eduardo Barrichello (United States) Gray Newell	Aston Martin M177 4.0 L Turbo V8	G	37	Contact
DNF	LMGT3	88	(Germany) Proton Competition	(Italy) Stefano Gattuso (Italy) Giammarco Levorato (United States) Logan Sargeant	Ford Mustang GT3 Evo	G	1	Suspension
DNF	LMGT3	88	(Germany) Proton Competition	(Italy) Stefano Gattuso (Italy) Giammarco Levorato (United States) Logan Sargeant	Ford Coyote 5.4 L V8	G	1	Suspension
DNF	LMGT3	61	(Italy) Iron Lynx	(Angola) Rui Andrade (Australia) Martin Berry (Belgium) Maxime Martin	Mercedes-AMG GT3 Evo	G	1	Chassis damage
DNF	LMGT3	61	(Italy) Iron Lynx	(Angola) Rui Andrade (Australia) Martin Berry (Belgium) Maxime Martin	Mercedes-AMG M159 6.2 L V8	G	1	Chassis damage

== Sources ==
FIA World Endurance Championship
Previous race: Lone Star Le Mans	2026 season	Next race: 8 Hours of Barcelona
