= Genesis GMR-001 =

- The No. 17 GMR-001 during the 2026 24 Hours of Le Mans
- Category: Le Mans Daytona h
- Constructor: Genesis (Oreca)
- Designers: François-Xavier Demaison (Technical Director, Hyundai Motorsport); Luc Donckerwolke (Chief Creative Officer, Genesis); Samir Sadikhov (Exterior Designer); Julien Moncet (Head of Powertrain, Hyundai Motorsport)

Technical specifications
- Chassis: LMP2-based carbon fibre monocoque
- Suspension: Double wishbones, pushrods actuated springs and dampers, anti-roll bar
- Length: 5,000 mm (196.9 in)
- Width: 2,000 mm (78.7 in)
- Wheelbase: 3,150 mm (124.0 in)
- Engine: Genesis G8MR 3.2 L (195.3 cu in) V8 twin turbocharged mid-engine
- Torque: 637 N⋅m (470 lb⋅ft)
- Electric motor: Rear-mounted 50 kW (68 PS; 67 hp) spec MGU supplied by Bosch
- Transmission: Xtrac P1359 7-speed sequential manual
- Power: 680 hp (507 kW; 689 PS)
- Weight: 1,030 kg (2,271 lb)
- Fuel: TotalEnergies
- Lubricants: Shell Helix Ultra
- Brakes: Ventilated carbon ceramic discs
- Tyres: Michelin radial slicks with OZ one-piece forged alloys, 29/71-18 front and 34/71-18 rear

Competition history
- Notable entrants: (South Korea) Genesis Magma Racing
- Notable drivers: (France) Paul-Loup Chatin (Brazil) Pipo Derani (France) Mathieu Jaminet (France) Mathys Jaubert (Spain) Daniel Juncadella (Germany) André Lotterer
- Debut: 2026 6 Hours of Imola
- Last event: 2026 6 Hours of Barcelona
Races	Poles
7	1

The Genesis GMR-001 is a sports prototype developed by Genesis and Oreca. Designed to compete under LMDh regulations, the GMR-001 made its debut in the FIA World Endurance Championship at the 2026 6 Hours of Imola in the Hypercar category, and is set to compete in the IMSA SportsCar Championship in the GTP category starting in 2027.

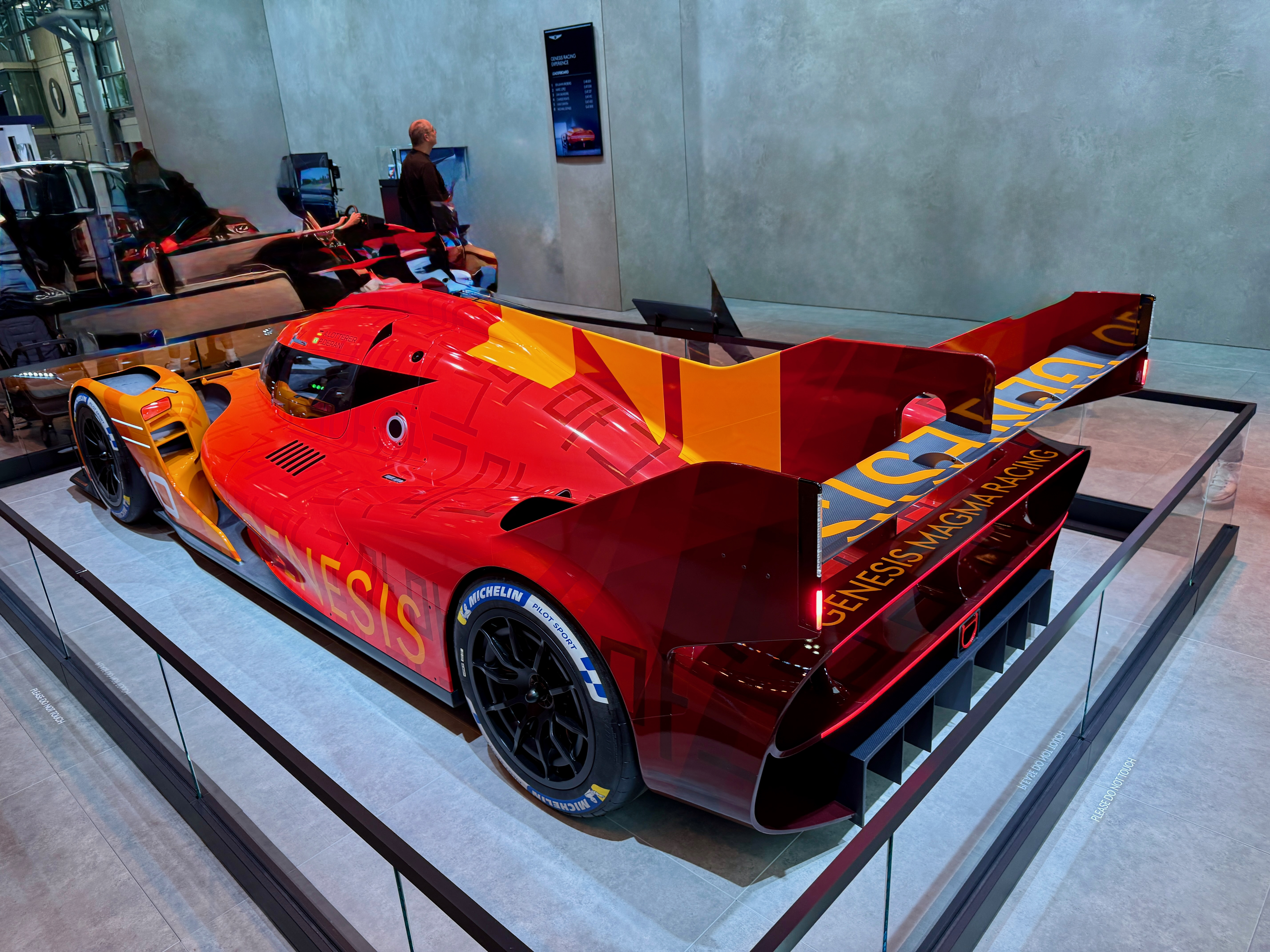
Rear view

== Background ==
In September 2024, Hyundai announced that they would be launching a LMDh programme under their Genesis luxury car brand with Oreca as the chassis supplier.

Genesis Motor formally unveiled their car on a large scale at a launch event in Dubai three months later in December 2024, now known as the GMR-001. At the event, they announced that their new team, Genesis Magma Racing, would officially enter the FIA World Endurance Championship with the GMR-001 by 2026, followed by an entry into the IMSA SportsCar Championship the year after. Team principal Cyril Abiteboul confirmed that the GMR-001 would be using a twin-turbocharged V8 engine and feature a hybrid system.

Alongside the unveiling, former FIA WEC champion André Lotterer and IMSA champion Pipo Derani were confirmed to have joined Genesis in helping develop the GMR-001. In preparation for the marque's official Hypercar participation, Genesis also confirmed their entry into the 2025 European Le Mans Series with IDEC Sport in LMP2, competing with an Oreca 07 driven by Jamie Chadwick, and Mathys Jaubert. Former Formula One driver Logan Sargeant was initially included in the line-up before he "stepped away" from the program prior to the season's commencement. He was replaced by Daniel Juncadella. Jaubert and Juncadella were later confirmed to be joining Genesis alongside Derani and Lotterer in September 2025.

The car completed its first shakedown test in August 2025 at Circuit Paul Ricard. It underwent its first rigorous endurance test a month later in September 2025 at Algarve International Circuit, completing 32 hours of test time with Lotterer, Derani, Jaubert, and Juncadella present at the test.

== Competition history ==
The driver lineups for both cars were confirmed in December 2025; the No. 17, driven by Pipo Derani, Mathys Jaubert, and André Lotterer, and the No. 19, driven by Paul-Loup Chatin, Daniel Juncadella, and Mathieu Jaminet. In its second-ever race, Genesis scored points with the GMR-001, finishing 8th with the No. 17 crew of Derani, Jaubert, and Lotterer.

== Racing results ==
=== Complete World Endurance Championship results ===
(Results in bold indicate pole position. Results in italics indicate fastest lap.)

Year	Entrant	Class	Drivers	No.	1	2	3	4	5	6	7	8	Points	Pos
2026*					IMO	SPA	LMN	SÃO	COA	FUJ	CAT	MNZ		
2026*	Genesis Magma Racing	Hypercar	(Brazil) Pipo Derani	17	15	8	Ret	15	7	15			12	8th
2026*	Genesis Magma Racing	Hypercar	(France) Mathys Jaubert	17	15	8	Ret	15	7	15			12	8th
2026*	Genesis Magma Racing	Hypercar	(Germany) André Lotterer	17	15	8	Ret	15	7	15			12	8th
2026*	Genesis Magma Racing	Hypercar	(France) Paul-Loup Chatin	19	17	13	13	12	15	11			12	8th
2026*	Genesis Magma Racing	Hypercar	(France) Mathieu Jaminet	19	17	13	13	12	15	11			12	8th
2026*	Genesis Magma Racing	Hypercar	(Spain) Daniel Juncadella	19	17	13	13	12	15	11			12	8th

* Season in progress.
