= Genesis Magma Racing =

Motorsports team of South Korean luxury brand, Genesis

(South Korea) Genesis Magma Racing
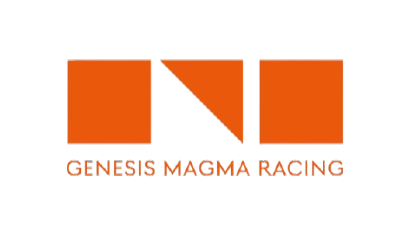
- Founded: 2024
- Founder(s): Genesis Motor
- Base: Le Castellet, Var, France
- Team principal(s): Cyril Abiteboul (president); Anouck Abadie (team manager); Gabriele Tarquini (sporting director); François-Xavier Demaison (technical director); Justin Taylor (chief engineer)
- Current series: FIA World Endurance Championship; European Le Mans Series
- Current drivers: FIA World Endurance Championship: 17. (Brazil) Pipo Derani (France) Mathys Jaubert (Germany) André Lotterer; 19. (France) Paul-Loup Chatin (France) Mathieu Jaminet (Spain) Daniel Juncadella; Genesis Trajectory Drivers: (United Kingdom) Jamie Chadwick (Germany) Laurents Hörr (Italy) Valerio Rinicella (South Korea) Michael Shin (South Korea) Kyuho Lee
- Website: Genesis Magma Racing

Genesis Magma Racing (Korean: 제네시스 마그마 레이싱) is the motorsports team of Genesis, the luxury brand of Hyundai Motor Group. It is part of Genesis' high-performance Magma program.

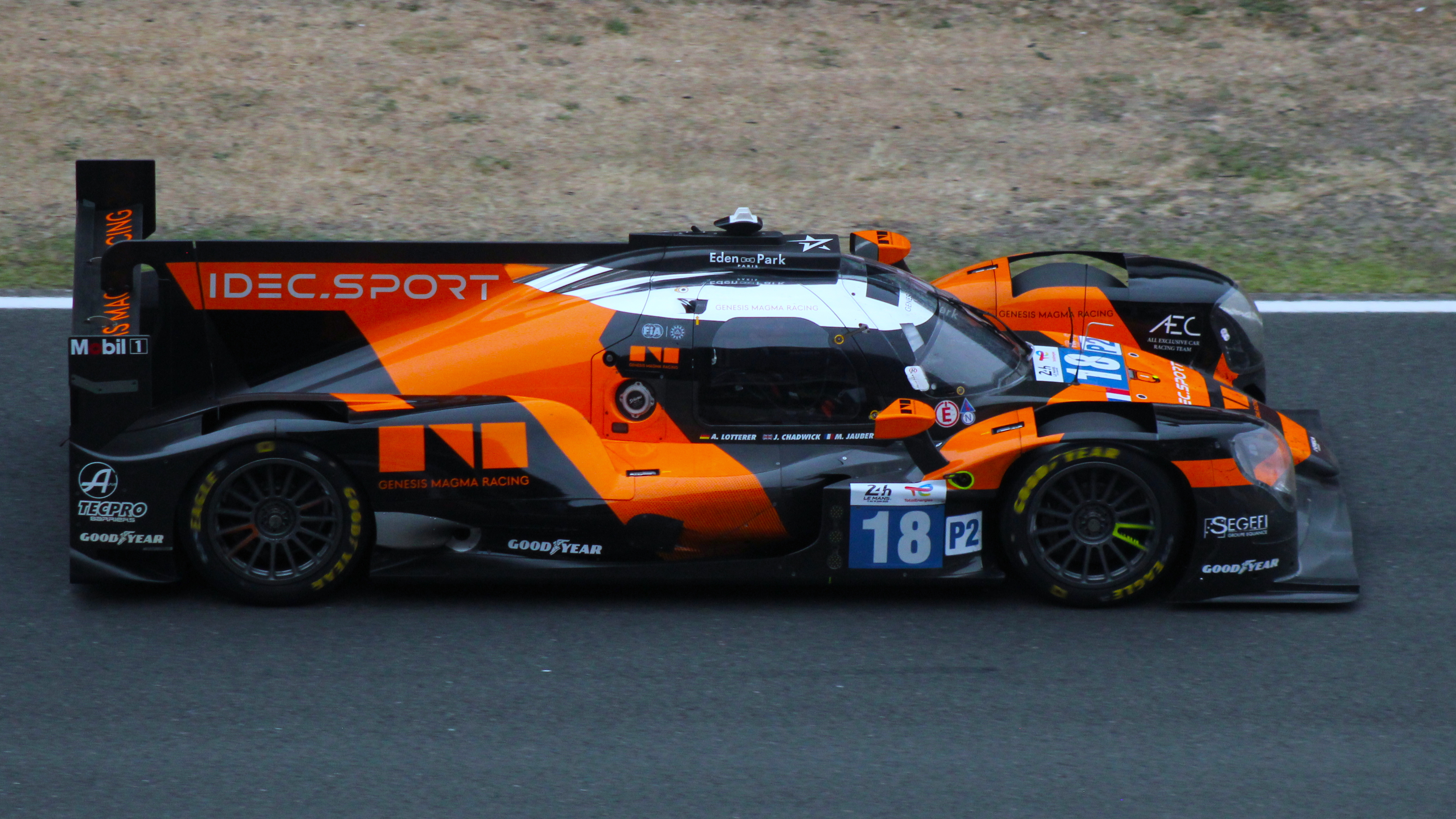
IDEC Sport's Genesis Magma Racing-backed Oreca 07 at the 2025 24 Hours of Le Mans.

== History ==
In April 2024, Genesis unveiled the brand's high-performance lineup, the Magma, in New York. On December 4, 2024, at the Genesis Motorsports Premiere event held in Dubai, United Arab Emirates, Genesis announced its plans to participate in endurance motorsports and unveiled its racing team, Genesis Magma Racing. The team logo is inspired by the initials (ㅁㄱㅁ) of the Hangul Magma (마그마).

In December 2024, the team announced plans to compete in the FIA World Endurance Championship from 2026 and the IMSA SportsCar Championship from 2027. The team has recruited André Lotterer and Pipo Derani as its drivers. Genesis also announced a partnership with IDEC Sport to develop its team for 2026 and run an Oreca 07 in the LMP2 class in the 2025 European Le Mans Series.

== Racing ==
=== GMR-001 ===
Genesis unveiled the GMR-001 hypercar in December 2024, which was inspired by the Magma program. An arch-shaped parabolic line extending from the front to the rear was applied, and an active spoiler was installed at the rear.

== Racing record ==
=== European Le Mans Series results ===
Year	Entrant	Class	Chassis	Engine	Drivers	No	1	2	3	4	5	6	Pos.	Pts
2025							BAR	LEC	IMO	SPA	SIL	POR		
2025	(France) IDEC Sport	LMP2	Oreca 07	Gibson GK428 4.2 L V8	(United Kingdom) Jamie Chadwick (France) Mathys Jaubert (Spain) Daniel Juncadella	18	1	1	11	11	1	3	3rd	90

=== 24 Hours of Le Mans results ===
Year	Entrant	No.	Car	Drivers	Class	Laps	Pos.	Class Pos.
2025	(France) IDEC Sport	18	Oreca 07-Gibson	(United Kingdom) Jamie Chadwick (France) Mathys Jaubert (Germany) André Lotterer	LMP2	206	DNF	DNF
2026	(South Korea) Genesis Magma Racing	17	Genesis GMR-001	(Brazil) Pipo Derani (France) Mathys Jaubert (Germany) André Lotterer	Hypercar	263	DNF	DNF
2026	(South Korea) Genesis Magma Racing	19	Genesis GMR-001	(France) Paul-Loup Chatin (France) Mathieu Jaminet (Spain) Daniel Juncadella	Hypercar	372	13th	13th

=== Complete World Endurance Championship results ===
Year	Entrant	Class	Chassis	Drivers	No.	1	2	3	4	5	6	7	8	Points	Pos
2026						IMO	SPA	LMN	SÃO	COA	FUJ	CAT	MNZ		
2026	(South Korea) Genesis Magma Racing	Hypercar	Genesis GMR-001	(Brazil) Pipo Derani	17	15	8	Ret	15	7	15	16		14*	8th*
2026	(South Korea) Genesis Magma Racing	Hypercar	Genesis GMR-001	(France) Mathys Jaubert	17	15	8	Ret	15	7	15	16		14*	8th*
2026	(South Korea) Genesis Magma Racing	Hypercar	Genesis GMR-001	(Germany) André Lotterer	17	15	8	Ret	15	7	15	16		14*	8th*
2026	(South Korea) Genesis Magma Racing	Hypercar	Genesis GMR-001	(France) Paul-Loup Chatin	19	17	13	13	12	15	11	11		14*	8th*
2026	(South Korea) Genesis Magma Racing	Hypercar	Genesis GMR-001	(France) Mathieu Jaminet	19	17	13	13	12	15	11	11		14*	8th*
2026	(South Korea) Genesis Magma Racing	Hypercar	Genesis GMR-001	(Spain) Daniel Juncadella	19	17	13	13	12	15	11	11		14*	8th*

* Season in progress.

== Driver development programme ==
Upon the team's foundation, Genesis collaborated with IDEC Sport to set up the Genesis Trajectory Programme. A year later, its scope was expanded beyond sports car racing. Its drivers include:

Driver	Years	Series competed	Hypercar experience
(France) Mathys Jaubert	2025	European Le Mans Series (2025)	Genesis (2026)
(Spain) Daniel Juncadella	2025	European Le Mans Series (2025)	Genesis (2026)
(United Kingdom) Jamie Chadwick	2025–2026	European Le Mans Series (2025–2026)	Genesis (2026)
(Germany) Laurents Hörr	2026	European Le Mans Series (2026)	—N/a
(Italy) Valerio Rinicella	2026	European Le Mans Series (2026)	—N/a
(South Korea) Michael Shin	2026	FIA Formula 3 Championship (2026)	—N/a
(South Korea) Kyuho Lee	2026	GB3 Championship (2026)	—N/a
