= Charlie Eastwood =

Irish racing driver (born 1995)

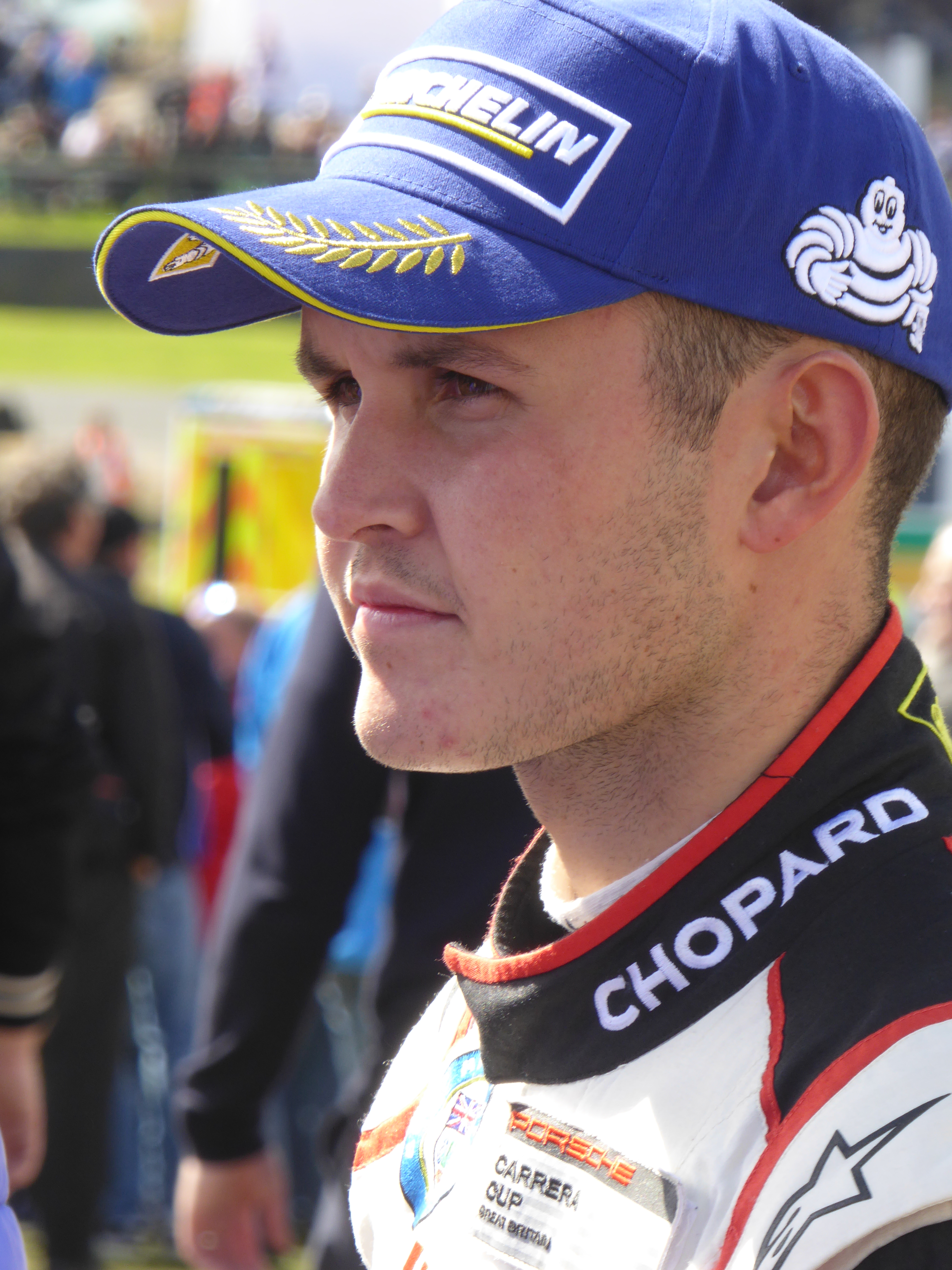
- Eastwood in 2017.
- Nationality: Irish
- Born: 11 August 1995 (age 31) Belfast, Northern Ireland

Porsche Carrera Cup Great Britain career
- Debut season: 2016
- Current team: Redline Racing
- Categorisation: FIA Silver (until 2019); FIA Gold (2020–)
- Car number: 28
- Starts: 31
- Wins: 5
- Podiums: 20
- Poles: 6
- Best finish: 1st in 2017

Previous series
- 2015 2014: Eurocup Formula Renault 2.0; Formula Renault 2.0 NEC; Toyota Racing Series NZ; BRDC Formula 4

Championship titles
- 2025 2023 2022 2019 2017: ELMS - LMGT3; Asian Le Mans Series; ELMS - LMP2 Pro-Am; Blancpain Endurance Cup Pro-Am; Porsche Carrera Cup Great Britain

Charlie Eastwood (born 11 August 1995) is an Irish racing driver who currently competes in the FIA World Endurance Championship for TF Sport. Having been an Aston Martin factory driver, Eastwood was signed by Corvette Racing in 2023.

Eastwood has collected a number of accolades in sportscar racing, including winning the 2017 Porsche Carrera Cup GB, the 2019 Blancpain GT Series Endurance Cup in the Pro-Am category, the LMP2 Pro-Am class of the 2022 European Le Mans Series, as well as the 2023 Asian Le Mans Series.

== Early career ==
Having become the 2012 Rotax Max World Karting champion, Eastwood began his single-seater career in 2014, driving in the BRDC Formula 4 Championship for Douglas Motorsport. He would score two podiums at the season-ending round at Snetterton to finish tenth overall.

Eastwood began the following year with a campaign in the Toyota Racing Series in New Zealand, where he would score three podiums as part of the M2 Competition outfit. Thereafter, he would compete in various rounds of the Formula Renault NEC and Eurocup Formula Renault categories, where he would not score any podiums. At the end of the year, Eastwood would win a two-year scholarship to become a Porsche-supported driver.

In 2016, Eastwood switched to sportscars, driving for Redline Racing in the Porsche Carrera Cup Great Britain. He impressed during his rookie season, claiming ten podiums and a win at Brands Hatch to finish the campaign in third place. He remained in the series in 2017, where four victories and a further six rostrum appearances helped him win the championship on countback against Dino Zamparelli.

== GT career ==
Ahead of the 2018 season, Eastwood signed with TF Sport to compete in the Silver Cup class of the Blancpain GT Series Endurance Cup as well as the LMGTE Am category of the FIA World Endurance Championship. In the former, Eastwood and teammates Ahmad Al Harthy and Euan McKay struggled, scoring a best in-class finish of fourth to end up seventh in the standings, last of all full-time entrants. The latter series brought more success, as the team finished on the podium four times, thus ending up third in the GTE Am standings.

In 2019, Eastwood would remain with TF to race in both series. Partnering Al Harthy and Salih Yoluç in the Pro-Am Cup of the Blancpain Endurance Series, Eastwood would clinch the championship, having won in the Pro-Am class at the 24 Hours of Spa. In the WEC, Eastwood and Yoluç were joined by pro driver Jonathan Adam, alongside whom they won the LMGTE Am category at the 2020 24 Hours of Le Mans and took the runner-up spot in the championship thanks to three further victories.

During the COVID-19 pandemic-affected 2020 campaign, Eastwood and Yoluç took part in the International GT Open series's pro class. The pair won three races, missing out on the title by just two points.

== Prototype & GT mix ==
Having competed in the GT class of the Asian Le Mans Series to start out 2021, Eastwood would take his first step into prototype racing by driving in the European Le Mans Series's LMP2 category for TF Sport-run Racing Team Turkey. Listed in the Pro-Am subclass, Eastwood and Salih Yoluç scored a lone win at Le Castellet alongside Harry Tincknell and placed fourth in the standings, having withdrawn from the season finale due to a crash in practice. The year also saw Eastwood win at Snetterton in the British GT Championship and take victory in a one-off round of the International GT Open.

The following year once again started with a campaign in the AsLMS, where Eastwood led Oman Racing towards sixth in the standings. He then embarked on his sophomore season in the ELMS, where he and Yoluç were joined by Jack Aitken for the majority of races. The trio scored three LMP2 Pro-Am victories, with a last-lap pass by one-off Aitken replacement Will Stevens giving the team a fourth win at Spa, on their way to a Pro-Am championship; Eastwood contributing to the title with chasing stints during the middle part of races.

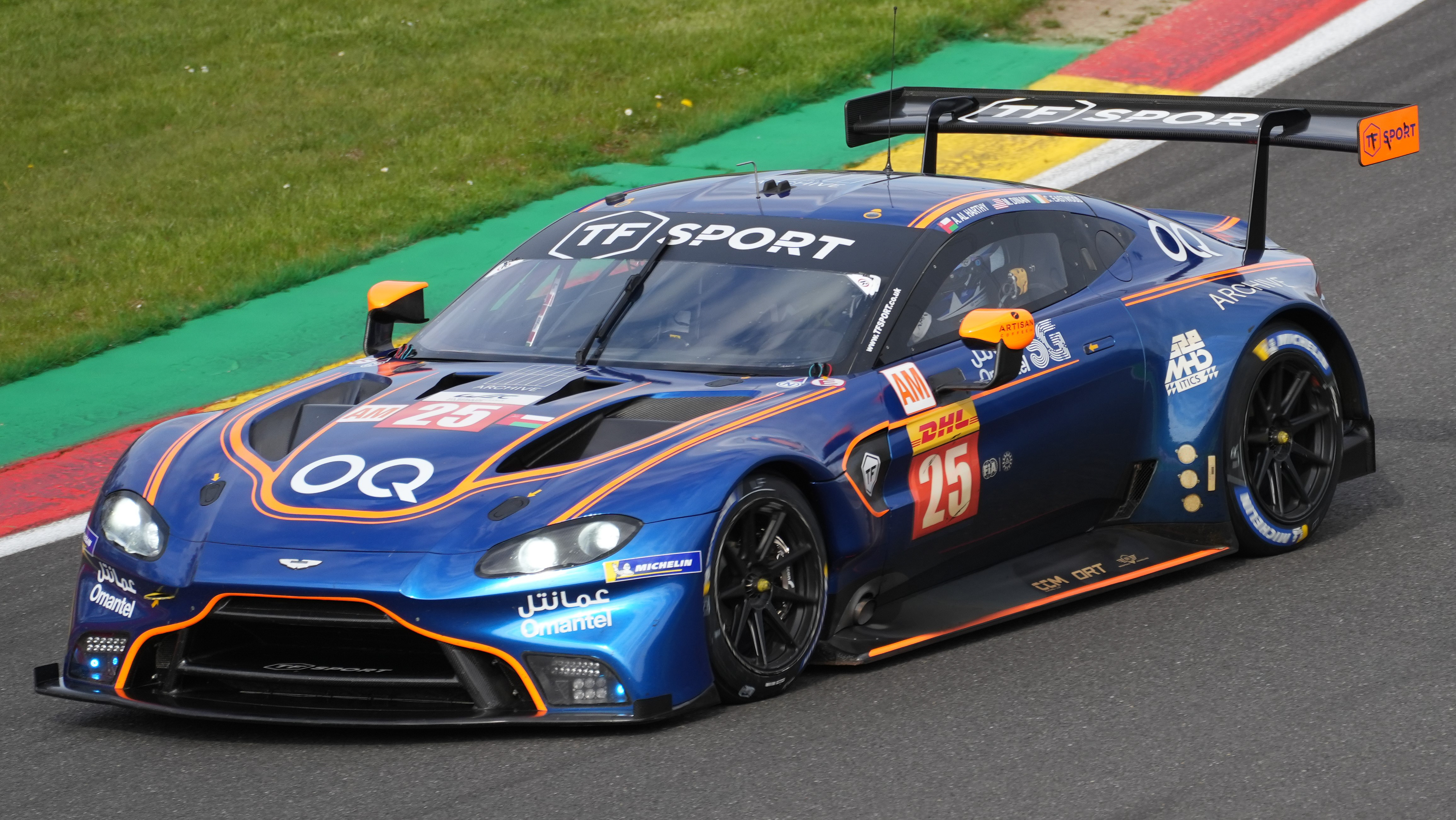
The No. 25 Aston Martin Vantage AMR that Eastwood drove at the 2023 6 Hours of Spa-Francorchamps

In 2023, Eastwood switched to LMP2 for the AsLMS, driving for DKR Engineering along with Yoluç and category rookie Ayhancan Güven. Podiums in all four races, including a win in the final round on Yas Island, gave the trio the title. This proved to be preparation for a double campaign, as Eastwood returned to the ELMS to defend his and RTT's Pro-Am title, whilst also leading ORT by TF in the FIA World Endurance Championship, partnering Michael Dinan and Ahmad Al Harthy in the LMGTE Am category. In the former, he, Yoluç, and Louis Delétraz recorded an overall LMP2 win at Barcelona and took a class win in France, but lost out on the title due to car issues at Aragón and a spin by Yoluç in Portugal. The team finished third in the LMP2 Pro-Am subclass. In the latter, Eastwood and his teammates finished third at Spa and scored a second place at the 24 Hours of Le Mans, which helped them towards fifth in the standings.

During the winter, Eastwood and Yoluç returned to the AsLMS, where they finished seventh in the teams' championship together with Michael Dinan.

== Corvette factory driver ==
Ahead of the 2024 season, Eastwood was announced as a Corvette factory driver. He would return to the WEC with TF Sport, driving a Chevrolet Corvette Z06 GT3.R in the newly formed LMGT3 category alongside Rui Andrade and Tom van Rompuy.

== Formula One ==
In 2025, it was announced that Eastwood had joined the Cadillac Formula One Team as a simulator driver.

== Racing record ==
=== Career summary ===
Season	Series	Team	Races	Wins	Poles	F/Laps	Podiums	Points	Position
2014	BRDC Formula 4 Championship	Douglas Motorsport	24	0	0	0	2	233	10th
2015	Toyota Racing Series	M2 Competition	16	0	0	1	3	535	7th
2015	Formula Renault 2.0 NEC	Strakka Racing	2	0	0	0	0	76	17th
2015	Formula Renault 2.0 NEC	Fortec Motorsports	2	0	0	0	0	76	17th
2015	Formula Renault 2.0 NEC	AVF	7	0	0	0	0	76	17th
2015	Eurocup Formula Renault 2.0	AVF	7	0	0	0	0	0	25th
2015	Eurocup Formula Renault 2.0	Strakka Racing	3	0	0	0	0	0	25th
2016	Porsche Carrera Cup GB	Redline Racing	16	1	1	1	10	246	**3rd**
2016	Porsche Supercup	Redline Racing	1	0	0	0	0	0	NC†
2016–17	NACAM Formula 4 Championship	MomoF4 Team	1	0	0	0	0	0	NC†
2017	Porsche Carrera Cup GB	Redline Racing	15	4	5	2	10	228	**1st**
2017	Porsche Supercup	Porsche Cars GB	1	0	0	0	0	0	NC†
2018	Blancpain GT Series Endurance Cup	Oman Racing with TF Sport	5	0	0	0	0	0	NC
2018	Blancpain GT Series Endurance Cup - Silver Cup	Oman Racing with TF Sport	5	0	0	0	0	47	7th
2018	24 Hours of Le Mans - LMGTE Am	TF Sport	1	0	0	0	0	N/A	DNF
2018	24 Hours of Nürburgring - AT	Care For Climate	1	0	0	0	1	N/A	**2nd**
2018–19	FIA World Endurance Championship - LMGTE Am	TF Sport	8	0	1	0	4	99	**3rd**
2019	Blancpain GT Series Endurance Cup	Oman Racing with TF Sport	5	0	0	0	0	0	NC
2019	Blancpain GT Series Endurance Cup - Pro-Am	Oman Racing with TF Sport	5	1	3	0	5	122	**1st**
2019	GT Cup Open Europe	Optimum Motorsport	2	0	0	?	1	18	18th
2019	24H Series - 991	Duel Racing							
2019	24 Hours of Le Mans - LMGTE Am	TF Sport	1	0	0	0	0	N/A	11th
2019–20	FIA World Endurance Championship - LMGTE Am	TF Sport	8	4	2	1	5	154	**2nd**
2020	International GT Open	TF Sport	12	3	3	0	8	112	**2nd**
2020	British GT Championship	Beechdean AMR	1	0	0	0	0	0	NC
2021	European Le Mans Series - LMP2	Racing Team Turkey	5	0	1	0	0	29.5	11th
2021	Asian Le Mans Series - GT	TF Sport	4	0	0	0	0	10	12th
2021	International GT Open	TF Sport	2	1	1	0	2	27	13th
2021	IMSA SportsCar Championship - GTD	TF Sport	2	0	0	0	0	259	52nd
2021	British GT Championship	Oman Racing Team with TF Sport	3	1	1	0	1	0	NC†
2021	GT World Challenge Europe Endurance Cup	Oman Racing Team with TF Sport	1	0	0	0	0	0	NC
2021	GT World Challenge Europe Endurance Cup	Garage 59	1	0	0	0	0	0	NC
2022	IMSA SportsCar Championship - GTD	Northwest AMR	1	0	0	0	0	211	61st
2022	Asian Le Mans Series - GT	Oman Racing	4	0	0	0	0	36	6th
2022	European Le Mans Series - LMP2	Racing Team Turkey	6	0	1	0	0	38	8th
2022	GT World Challenge Europe Endurance Cup	Heart of Racing with TF Sport	1	0	0	0	0	0	NC
2022–23	Formula E	NEOM McLaren Formula E Team	Test driver						
2023	FIA World Endurance Championship - LMGTE Am	ORT by TF	7	0	1	0	2	65	5th
2023	24 Hours of Le Mans - LMGTE Am	ORT by TF	1	0	0	0	1	N/A	**2nd**
2023	European Le Mans Series - LMP2 Pro-Am	Racing Team Turkey	6	2	4	0	3	94	**3rd**
2023	Asian Le Mans Series - LMP2	DKR Engineering	4	1	0	0	4	76	**1st**
2023–24	Asian Le Mans Series - LMP2	TF Sport	5	0	2	0	0	42	8th
2024	FIA World Endurance Championship - LMGT3	TF Sport	8	0	1	0	1	50	10th
2024	IMSA SportsCar Championship - GTD	AWA	1	0	0	0	0	152	71st
2024	IMSA SportsCar Championship - LMP2	Tower Motorsports	4	0	0	0	0	1001	27th
2024	GT World Challenge Europe Sprint Cup	Racing Team Turkey	4	0	0	1	0	0	NC
2024	GT World Challenge Europe Sprint Cup - Gold Cup	Racing Team Turkey	4	0	0	1	1	32	7th
2025	FIA World Endurance Championship - LMGT3	TF Sport	8	1	0	0	3	81	5th
2025	European Le Mans Series - LMGT3	TF Sport	6	2	1	0	3	78	**1st**
2025	IMSA SportsCar Championship - GTD	DXDT Racing	5	0	0	0	0	992	29th
2025–26	Asian Le Mans Series - GT	Racing Team Turkey	6	0	0	0	0	13	19th
2026	FIA World Endurance Championship - LMGT3	Racing Team Turkey by TF	8	1	0	0	2	70	6th
2026	IMSA SportsCar Championship - GTD	DXDT Racing	5	0	0	0	1	1120	34th
2026	European Le Mans Series - LMGT3	TF Sport	6	1	1	1	4	88	**1st**
2026	Formula One	Cadillac F1 Team	Simulator driver						

^{†} As Eastwood was a guest driver, he was ineligible to score points.

=== Complete Formula Renault 2.0 NEC results ===
(key) (Races in bold indicate pole position) (Races in italics indicate fastest lap)

Year	Entrant	1	2	3	4	5	6	7	8	9	10	11	12	13	14	15	16	DC	Points
2015	Strakka Racing	MNZ; 1; 17	MNZ; 2; 20†															17th	76
2015	Fortec Motorsports			SIL; 1; 13	SIL; 2; 14													17th	76
2015	AVF					RBR; 1; 11	RBR; 2; 5	RBR; 3; 7	SPA; 1; 11	SPA; 2; 22	ASS; 1; 21	ASS; 2; 15	NÜR; 1	NÜR; 2	HOC; 1	HOC; 2	HOC; 3	17th	76

=== Complete Eurocup Formula Renault 2.0 results ===
(key) (Races in bold indicate pole position; races in italics indicate fastest lap)

Year	Entrant	1	2	3	4	5	6	7	8	9	10	11	12	13	14	15	16	17	DC	Points
2015	Strakka Racing	ALC; 1; 14	ALC; 2; 13	ALC; 3 Ret															25th	0
2015	AVF				SPA; 1; 22	SPA; 2; 18	HUN; 1; 16	HUN; 2; 15	SIL; 1; 15	SIL; 2; 14	SIL; 3; 15	NÜR; 1	NÜR; 2	LMS; 1	LMS; 2	JER; 1	JER; 2	JER; 3	25th	0

=== Complete Porsche Carrera Cup Great Britain results ===
(key) (Races in bold indicate pole position) (Races in italics indicate fastest lap)

Year	Team	1	2	3	4	5	6	7	8	9	10	11	12	13	14	15	16	DC	Points
2016	Redline Racing	BHI; 1; 4	BHI; 2; 6	SILGP; 1; 3	SILGP; 2; 3	OUL; 1; 3	OUL; 2; 5	CRO; 1; 4	CRO; 2; 8	SNE; 1; 2	SNE; 2; 2	KNO; 1; 2	KNO; 2; 2	SILN; 1; 3	SILN; 2; 4	**BHGP**; **1**; 1	BHGP; 2; 3	3rd	246
2017	Redline Racing	BHI; 1; 2	BHI; 2; 2	**DON**; **1**; 1	**DON**; **2**; 1	OUL; 1; 7	OUL; 2; 3	LMS; 1; 8	**SNE**; **1**; 1	**SNE**; **2**; 2	KNO; 1; 3	**KNO**; **2**; 1	SILN; 1; 4	SILN; 2; 3	BHGP; 1; 4	BHGP; 2; 5		1st	228

=== Complete GT World Challenge Europe results ===
(key) (Races in bold indicate pole position; results in italics indicate fastest lap)

==== GT World Challenge Europe Endurance Cup ====
Year	Team	Car	Class	1	2	3	4	5	6	7	Pos	Points
2018	Oman Racing with TF Sport	Aston Martin Vantage AMR GT3	Silver	MNZ; 19	SIL; 39	LEC; 19	SPA; 6H; 61	SPA; 12H; 61	SPA; 24H; Ret	CAT; 22	7th	47
2019	Oman Racing with TF Sport	Aston Martin Vantage AMR GT3	Pro-Am	**MNZ**; 35	**SIL**; 23	**LEC**; 26	SPA; 6H; 26	SPA; 12H; 20	SPA; 24H; 22	CAT; 14	1st	122
2021	Garage 59	Aston Martin Vantage AMR GT3	Pro-Am	MNZ	LEC	SPA; 6H; 23	SPA; 12H; 47	**SPA**; **24H**; Ret	NÜR		18th	25
2021	Oman Racing with TF Sport	Aston Martin Vantage AMR GT3	Pro-Am							CAT; 27	18th	25
2022	Heart of Racing with TF Sport	Aston Martin Vantage AMR GT3	Pro	IMO	LEC	SPA; 6H; 60	SPA; 12H; 51	SPA; 24H; 38	HOC	CAT	NC	0

==== GT World Challenge Europe Sprint Cup ====
Year	Team	Car	Class	1	2	3	4	5	6	7	8	9	10	Pos.	Points
2024	Racing Team Turkey	Ferrari 296 GT3	Gold	BRH; 1; 21	BRH; 2; 20	MIS; 1; 22	MIS; 2; 16	HOC; 1	HOC; 2	MAG; 1	MAG; 2	CAT; 1	CAT; 2	7th	32

=== Complete FIA World Endurance Championship results ===
(key) (Races in bold indicate pole position; races in italics indicate fastest lap)

Year	Entrant	Class	Chassis	Engine	1	2	3	4	5	6	7	8	Rank	Points
2018–19	TF Sport	LMGTE Am	Aston Martin Vantage GTE	Aston Martin AJ37 4.5 L V8	SPA; 2	LMS; Ret	SIL; 2	FUJ; 2	SHA; 8	SEB; 6	**SPA**; 2	LMS; 6	3rd	99
2019–20	TF Sport	LMGTE Am	Aston Martin Vantage AMR	Aston Martin M177 4.0 L Turbo V8	**SIL**; 7	**FUJ**; 1	SHA; 1	BHR; Ret	COA; 1	SPA; 3	LMS; 1	BHR; 8	2nd	154
2023	ORT by TF Sport	LMGTE Am	Aston Martin Vantage AMR	Aston Martin M177 4.0 L Turbo V8	SEB; 9	ALG; 8	**SPA**; 3	LMS; 2	MNZ; 7	FUJ; 13	BHR; NC		5th	65
2024	TF Sport	LMGT3	Chevrolet Corvette Z06 GT3.R	Chevrolet LT6.R 5.5 L V8	**QAT**; Ret	IMO; 7	SPA; Ret	LMS; 12	SÃO; 8	COA; Ret	FUJ; 4	BHR; 2	10th	50
2025	TF Sport	LMGT3	Chevrolet Corvette Z06 GT3.R	Chevrolet LT6.R 5.5 L V8	QAT; Ret	IMO; 6	SPA; 14	LMS; 3	SÃO; 2	COA; 13	FUJ; 1	BHR; 11	5th	81
2026	Racing Team Turkey by TF	LMGT3	Chevrolet Corvette Z06 GT3.R	Chevrolet LT6.R 5.5 L V8	IMO; Ret	SPA; 9	LMS; 6	SÃO; 1	COA; 14	FUJ; 3	CAT; 4	MNZ; 11	6th	70

=== Complete 24 Hours of Le Mans results ===
Year	Team	Co-Drivers	Car	Class	Laps	Pos.	Class Pos.
2018	(United Kingdom) TF Sport	(United Kingdom) Euan Hankey (Turkey) Salih Yoluç	Aston Martin Vantage GTE	GTE; Am	304	DNF	DNF
2019	(United Kingdom) TF Sport	(United Kingdom) Euan Hankey (Turkey) Salih Yoluç	Aston Martin Vantage GTE	GTE; Am	327	42nd	11th
2020	(United Kingdom) TF Sport	(United Kingdom) Jonathan Adam (Turkey) Salih Yoluç	Aston Martin Vantage AMR	GTE; Am	339	24th	**1st**
2023	(Oman) ORT by TF	(Oman) Ahmad Al Harthy (United States) Michael Dinan	Aston Martin Vantage AMR	GTE; Am	312	28th	**2nd**
2024	(United Kingdom) TF Sport	(Angola) Rui Andrade (Belgium) Tom van Rompuy	Chevrolet Corvette Z06 GT3.R	LMGT3	267	43rd	15th
2025	(United Kingdom) TF Sport	(Angola) Rui Andrade (Belgium) Tom van Rompuy	Chevrolet Corvette Z06 GT3.R	LMGT3	341	35th	**3rd**
2026	Racing Team Turkey by TF	(Republic of Ireland) Peter Dempsey (Turkey) Salih Yoluç	Chevrolet Corvette Z06 GT3.R	LMGT3	335	38th	6th

=== Complete International GT Open results ===
(key) (Races in bold indicate pole position; results in italics indicate fastest lap)

Year	Entrant	Class	Chassis	1	2	3	4	5	6	7	8	9	10	11	12	13	14	Rank	Points
2020	TF Sport	Pro	Aston Martin Vantage AMR GT3	HUN; 1; 6	HUN; 2; 3	**LEC**; **1**; 1	LEC; 2; 3	RBR; 1; 9	**RBR**; **2**; 1	MNZ; 1; 2	MNZ; 2; 10	SPA; 1; 5	SPA; 2; 2	**CAT**; **1**; 3	CAT; 2; 1			2nd	112
2021	TF Sport	Pro	Aston Martin Vantage AMR GT3	LEC; 1	LEC; 2	SPA; 1	SPA; 2	HUN; 1	HUN; 2	IMO; 1	IMO; 2	RBR; 1; 2	**RBR**; **2**; 1	MNZ; 1	MNZ; 2	CAT; 1	CAT; 2	9th	27

=== Complete British GT Championship results ===
(key) (Races in bold indicate pole position) (Races in italics indicate fastest lap)

Year	Team	Car	Class	1	2	3	4	5	6	7	8	9	DC	Points
2020	Beechdean AMR	Aston Martin Vantage AMR GT3	GT3	OUL; 1	OUL; 2	DON; 1	DON; 2	BRH; 1	DON; 1	SNE; 1	SNE; 2	SIL; 1 Ret	NC	0
2021	Oman Racing Team with TF Sport	Aston Martin Vantage AMR GT3	GT3	BRH; 1	SIL; 1; 4	DON; 1	SPA; 1	**SNE**; **1**; 1	SNE; 2; 4	OUL; 1	OUL; 2	DON; 1	NC†	0†

^{†} As Eastwood was a guest driver, he was ineligible to score points.

=== Complete IMSA SportsCar Championship results ===
(key) (Races in bold indicate pole position; races in italics indicate fastest lap)

Year	Entrant	Class	Make	Engine	1	2	3	4	5	6	7	8	9	10	11	12	Rank	Points	Ref
2021	TF Sport	GTD	Aston Martin Vantage AMR GT3	Aston Martin M177 4.0 L Turbo V8	DAY; 7	SEB	MDO	DET	WGL	WGL	LIM	ELK	LGA	LBH	VIR	PET	52nd	259	
2022	Northwest AMR	GTD	Aston Martin Vantage AMR GT3	Aston Martin M177 4.0 L Turbo V8	DAY; 12	SEB	LBH	LGA	MDO	DET	WGL	MOS	LIM	ELK	VIR	PET	61st	211	
2024	AWA	GTD	Chevrolet Corvette Z06 GT3.R	Chevrolet LT6.R 5.5 L V8	DAY; 18		LBH	LGA				VIR					71st	152	
2024	Tower Motorsports	LMP2	Oreca 07	Gibson GK428 4.2 L V8		SEB; 12			WGL; 6	MOS	ELK; 6		IMS; 8	PET			27th	1001	
2025	DXDT Racing	GTD	Chevrolet Corvette Z06 GT3.R	Chevrolet LT6.R 5.5 L V8	DAY; 19	SEB; 8	LBH	LGA	WGL; 15	MOS	ELK	VIR	IMS; 17	PET; 7			29th	992	
2026	DXDT Racing	GTD	Chevrolet Corvette Z06 GT3.R	Chevrolet LT6.R 5.5 L V8	DAY; 17	SEB; 9	LBH	LGA	WGL; 11	MOS	ELK; 14	VIR	IMS	PET; 3			34th	1120	

=== Complete European Le Mans Series results ===
(key) (Races in bold indicate pole position; results in italics indicate fastest lap)

Year	Entrant	Class	Chassis	Engine	1	2	3	4	5	6	Rank	Points
2021	Racing Team Turkey	LMP2	Oreca 07	Gibson GK428 4.2 L V8	CAT; 15	**RBR**; 4	LEC; 6	MNZ; 7	SPA; Ret	ALG; WD	11th	29.5
2021	Racing Team Turkey	Pro-Am Cup	Oreca 07	Gibson GK428 4.2 L V8	6	2	1	2	Ret	WD	4th	70
2022	Racing Team Turkey	LMP2	Oreca 07	Gibson GK428 4.2 L V8	LEC; 6	IMO; 7	MNZ; 7	CAT; 10	SPA; 6	**ALG**; 6	8th	38
2022	Racing Team Turkey	Pro-Am Cup	Oreca 07	Gibson GK428 4.2 L V8	1	1	2	4	1	1	1st	131
2023	Racing Team Turkey	LMP2 Pro-Am	Oreca 07	Gibson GK428 4.2 L V8	**CAT**; 1	**LEC**; 1	**ARA**; 9	**SPA**; 2	ALG; 6	ALG; 4	3rd	94
2025	TF Sport	LMGT3	Chevrolet Corvette Z06 GT3.R	Chevrolet LT6.R 5.5 L V8	CAT; 6	LEC; Ret	IMO; 1	SPA; 8	SIL; 3	**ALG**; 1	1st	78
2026	TF Sport	LMGT3	Chevrolet Corvette Z06 GT3.R	Chevrolet LT6.R 5.5 L V8	CAT; Ret	LEC; 2	**IMO**; 1	SPA; 6	SIL; 2	ALG; 2	1st	88

=== Complete Asian Le Mans Series results ===
(key) (Races in bold indicate pole position) (Races in italics indicate fastest lap)

Year	Team	Class	Car	Engine	1	2	3	4	5	6	Pos.	Points
2021	TF Sport	GT	Aston Martin Vantage AMR GT3	Aston Martin M177 4.0 L Turbo V8	DUB; 1; 10	DUB; 2; 11	ABU; 1; 16	ABU; 2; 6			12th	10
2022	Oman Racing Team with TF Sport	GT	Aston Martin Vantage AMR GT3	Aston Martin M177 4.0 L Turbo V8	DUB; 1; 6	DUB; 2; 5	ABU; 1; 5	ABU; 2; 4			5th	40
2023	DKR Engineering	LMP2	Oreca 07	Gibson GK428 4.2 L V8	DUB; 1; 2	DUB; 2; 2	ABU; 1; 3	ABU; 2; 1			1st	76
2023–24	TF Sport	LMP2	Oreca 07	Gibson GK428 4.2 L V8	**SEP**; **1**; 7	**SEP**; **2**; 8	DUB; 1; 5	ABU; 1; 4	ABU; 2; 6		8th	42
2025–26	Racing Team Turkey	GT	Chevrolet Corvette Z06 GT3.R	Chevrolet LT6.R 5.5 L V8	SEP; 1; 8	SEP; 2; 19	DUB; 1; 8	DUB; 2; 9	ABU; 1 Ret	ABU; 2; 11	19th	13

Sporting positions
Preceded by Dan Cammish	Porsche Carrera Cup GB; Champion; 2017	Succeeded by Tio Ellinas
Preceded by Lewis Williamson; Nick Leventis; Chris Buncombe	Blancpain GT Series Endurance Cup; Pro-Am Champion; 2019; With: Ahmad Al Harthy & Salih Yoluç	Succeeded by Chris Goodwin; Alexander West (GT World Challenge Europe Endurance Cup)
Preceded by Rui Andrade; John Falb	European Le Mans Series; LMP2 Pro-Am Champion; 2022; With: Salih Yoluç	Succeeded by Matthieu Vaxivière; François Perrodo
Preceded by Ben Hanley; Matt Bell; Rodrigo Sales	Asian Le Mans Series; LMP2 Champion; 2023; With: Ayhancan Güven & Salih Yoluç	Succeeded by Colin Braun; Malthe Jakobsen; George Kurtz
Preceded by Andrea Caldarelli; Axcil Jefferies; Hiroshi Hamaguchi	European Le Mans Series; LMGT3 Champion; 2025; With: Rui Andrade & Hiroshi Koizumi	Succeeded by Incumbent
