= Salih Yoluç =

Turkish racing driver

- Yoluç in 2018
- Nationality: (Turkey) Turkish
- Born: Ahmet Salih Yoluç; 22 August 1985 (age 41) Istanbul, Turkey

European Le Mans Series career
- Debut season: 2015
- Current team: Racing Team Turkey
- Categorisation: FIA Bronze (until 2023); FIA Silver (2024–)
- Car number: 34
- Starts: 19
- Wins: 7
- Podiums: 14
- Poles: 4
- Fastest laps: 1
- Best finish: 1st in 2022

Championship titles
- 2023 2022 2019: Asian Le Mans Series; European Le Mans Series; Blancpain GT Series Endurance Cup

Ahmet Salih Yoluç (born 22 August 1985, Istanbul) is a Turkish racing driver. As a bronze-ranked competitor, Yoluç has taken notable accolades in sportscar racing, including the 2020 LMGTE Am class victory at Le Mans, the Pro-Am title in the 2019 Blancpain GT Series Endurance Cup, as well as the 2022 European Le Mans Series and 2023 Asian Le Mans Series championships in the LMP2 category.

== Early GT career ==
Yoluç started his racing career in 2015 with Optimum Motorsport in the British GT Championship. The Turkish driver was able to taste success in his maiden season, winning the Dubai 24 Hour race.

At the end of 2015, Yoluç made a move to what would become his long-term team, TF Sport, and competed in the GT3 Le Mans Cup. There, Yoluç and Euan Hankey finished second in the drivers' standings with two victories, though they would win the teams' title. The pair also drove in International GT Open during the same year, winning two races on their way to sixth place overall.

For the 2017 season, Yoluç moved into the LMGTE class of the European Le Mans Series alongside Hankey and Aston Martin factory driver Nicki Thiim. The trio fought for the title throughout the year, winning the season opener at Silverstone and taking podiums in five races, though they missed out to JMW Motorsport by merely two points. That year, Yoluç also raced in the Pro-Am class of the Blancpain GT Series Endurance Cup. Competing in the final three races, Yoluç would help teammates Jonathan Adam and Ahmad Al Harthy to two podium finishes, including second in class at the 24 Hours of Spa, which earned them the Pro-Am title. In addition, Yoluç became the first ever Turkish driver to compete in 24 Hours of Le Mans. He finished seventh in class.

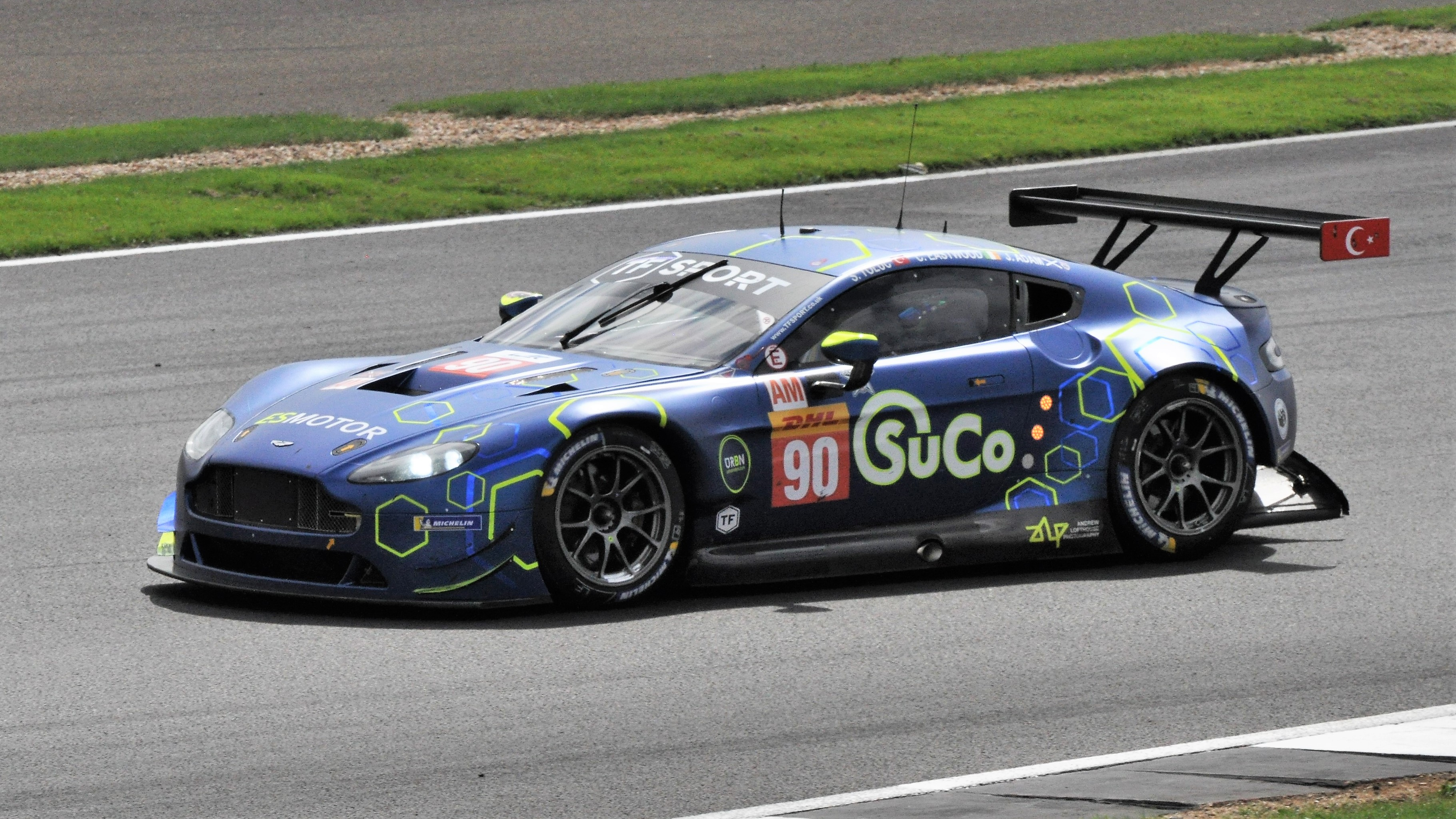
Salih Yoluç turns in to Village corner in the number 90 TF Sport-entered Aston Martin Vantage GTE, during the 2018 6 Hours of Silverstone race.

Yoluç switched to the FIA World Endurance Championship for its "Super Season", partnering Charlie Eastwood on a full-time basis. Despite a late retirement at Le Mans, the team performed well, scoring four podiums to end the season in third. In 2019, Yoluç and Eastwood also raced in the Blancpain GT Series Endurance Cup, winning the Pro-Am Cup title after triumphing during the 24 Hours of Spa.

During the second half of 2019, the Turkish-Irish pair would join Jonathan Adam in the WEC with TF Sport. During the season held over two years, the trio won the LMGTE Am category at the 2020 24 Hours of Le Mans and took the runner-up spot in the championship with three further wins.

== Prototype career & ranking upgrade ==
Yoluç switched to prototypes in 2021, racing an Oreca 07 in the LMP2 class of the ELMS with the TF Sport-offshoot Racing Team Turkey. Alongside Eastwood and Harry Tincknell, the Turkish driver was able to celebrate a lone victory at Le Castellet, though they would end up fourth in the LMP2 Pro-Am standings after a crash in practice prevented them from taking part in the final round. Yoluç and Eastwood returned with RTT for the 2022 season, this time teaming up with Jack Aitken. The outfit was dominant in the Pro-Am class, winning four races on their way to the title.

Ahead of the main 2023 campaign, Yoluç and Eastwood, who would be going into their sixth year as teammates, drove alongside Ayhancan Güven in the Asian Le Mans Series with DKR Engineering. With a win in Abu Dhabi and three further podiums, the trio took the LMP2 title. For their European season in the ELMS, Yoluç and Eastwood were joined by Louis Delétraz, who immediately helped them towards the overall race victory at Barcelona. From there on, the trio only focused for overall standings, another overall win in France was about to come until a late puncture demoted them to third overall. A DNF at Aragón and issues at Algarve event made them only finish third in the overall standings. At Le Mans, Yoluç retired during the evening.

During the winter, Yoluç and Eastwood took part in AsLMS alongside Michael Dinan, where the Turkish driver scored two pole positions but only ended up seventh in the teams' standings, before he was upgraded to an FIA silver-ranked competitor ahead of the 2024 season. As that meant that he could no longer compete in the ELMS's Pro-Am class, Yoluç moved into the Gold Cup category of the GT World Challenge Europe Sprint Cup with Eastwood, as well as partaking in several events of the GTD category of the IMSA SportsCar Championship with Lone Star Racing. The Sprint Cup campaign lasted for just two events, with the highlight being a class podium at Misano, meanwhile eighth in GTD at Daytona was the best result of Yoluç's IMSA season.

== Racing record ==
=== Career summary ===
| Season | Series | Team | Races | Wins | Poles | F/Laps | Podiums | Points | Position |
|---|---|---|---|---|---|---|---|---|---|
| 2015 | British GT Championship - GT3 | Von Ryan Racing | 4 | 0 | 0 | 0 | 0 | 4 | 23rd |
| 2015 | Blancpain Endurance Series - Pro Am | TF Sport | 1 | 0 | 0 | 0 | 0 | 0 | 37th |
| 2015 | International GT Open - Am | TF Sport | 6 | 0 | 0 | 0 | 0 | 0 | NC |
| 2015 | European Le Mans Series - GTC | TF Sport | 1 | 0 | 0 | 0 | 0 | 0 | 8th |
| 2015 | 24H Series - SP3 | Optimum Motorsport | | | | | | | |
| 2016 | Blancpain GT Series Endurance Cup | Black Falcon | 1 | 0 | 0 | 0 | 0 | 0 | NC |
| 2016 | Porsche Carrera Cup Great Britain | In2 Racing | 2 | 0 | 0 | 0 | 0 | 0 | 28th |
| 2016 | International GT Open - Pro Am | TF Sport | 12 | 2 | 0 | 0 | 3 | 37 | 6th |
| 2016 | GT3 Le Mans Cup | TF Sport | 6 | 2 | 0 | 0 | 5 | 107 | **2nd** |
| 2017 | Porsche GT3 Cup Middle East | Lechner Racing | 10 | 0 | 0 | 0 | 0 | 90 | 13th |
| 2017 | Blancpain GT Series Endurance Cup | Oman Racing with TF Sport | 5 | 0 | 0 | 0 | 0 | 7 | 26th |
| 2017 | Intercontinental GT Challenge | Oman Racing with TF Sport | 1 | 0 | 0 | 0 | 0 | 0 | NC |
| 2017 | European Le Mans Series - GTE | TF Sport | 6 | 1 | 0 | 0 | 5 | 102 | **2nd** |
| 2018 | Blancpain GT Series Endurance Cup | Ram Racing | 3 | 0 | 0 | 0 | 0 | 0 | NC |
| 2018 | FIA Nations Cup | Team Turkey | 3 | 2 | 1 | 0 | 3 | N/A | **1st** |
| 2018–19 | FIA World Endurance Championship - GTE Am | TF Sport | 8 | 0 | 0 | 0 | 4 | 99 | **3rd** |
| 2018–19 | Asian Le Mans Series - LMP2 | United Autosports | 4 | 0 | 0 | 0 | 1 | 33 | 8th |
| 2019 | Blancpain GT Series Endurance Cup - Pro-Am | Oman Racing with TF Sport | 5 | 1 | 3 | 0 | 5 | 122 | **1st** |
| 2019 | FIA Motorsport Games GT Cup | Team Turkey | 3 | 0 | 0 | 0 | 0 | N/A | 12th |
| 2019–20 | FIA World Endurance Championship - GTE Am | TF Sport | 8 | 4 | 2 | 0 | 5 | 154 | **2nd** |
| 2020 | International GT Open | TF Sport | 12 | 3 | 0 | 0 | 8 | 112 | **2nd** |
| 2021 | European Le Mans Series - LMP2 Pro Am | Racing Team Turkey | 5 | 1 | 0 | 0 | 3 | 70 | 4th |
| 2021 | IMSA SportsCar Championship - LMP2 | RWR Eurasia | 2 | 0 | 0 | 0 | 0 | 0 | NC |
| 2022 | Formula Regional Asian Championship | Pinnacle Motorsport | 15 | 0 | 0 | 0 | 0 | 0 | 36th |
| 2022 | European Le Mans Series - LMP2 Pro/Am | Racing Team Turkey | 6 | 4 | 1 | 0 | 5 | 131 | **1st** |
| 2023 | Asian Le Mans Series - LMP2 | DKR Engineering | 4 | 1 | 0 | 0 | 4 | 76 | **1st** |
| 2023 | European Le Mans Series - LMP2 Pro/Am | Racing Team Turkey | 6 | 2 | 4 | 1 | 3 | 94 | **3rd** |
| 2023 | 24 Hours of Le Mans - LMP2 | Racing Team Turkey | 1 | 0 | 0 | 0 | 0 | N/A | DNF |
| 2023 | IMSA SportsCar Championship - LMP2 | Tower Motorsports | 1 | 0 | 0 | 0 | 0 | 260 | 28th |
| 2023–24 | Asian Le Mans Series - LMP2 | TF Sport | 5 | 0 | 2 | 0 | 0 | 42 | 8th |
| 2024 | GT World Challenge Europe Sprint Cup | Racing Team Turkey | 4 | 0 | 0 | 1 | 0 | 0 | NC |
| 2024 | GT World Challenge Europe Sprint Cup - Gold Cup | Racing Team Turkey | 4 | 0 | 0 | 0 | 1 | 32 | 7th |
| 2024 | IMSA SportsCar Championship - GTD | Lone Star Racing | 5 | 0 | 0 | 0 | 0 | 945 | 38th |
| 2025 | IMSA SportsCar Championship - GTD | DXDT Racing | 5 | 0 | 0 | 0 | 0 | 992 | 29th |
| 2025–26 | Asian Le Mans Series - GT | Racing Team Turkey | 6 | 0 | 0 | 0 | 0 | 13 | 19th |
| 2026 | IMSA SportsCar Championship - GTD | DXDT Racing | 4 | 0 | 0 | 0 | 1 | 928 | 38th |
| 2026 | FIA World Endurance Championship - LMGT3 | Racing Team Turkey by TF | | | | | | | |

=== Complete European Le Mans Series results ===
(key) (Races in bold indicate pole position; results in italics indicate fastest lap)

| Year | Entrant | Class | Chassis | Engine | 1 | 2 | 3 | 4 | 5 | 6 | Rank | Points |
|---|---|---|---|---|---|---|---|---|---|---|---|---|
| 2015 | TF Sport | GTC | Aston Martin V12 Vantage GT3 | Aston Martin 4.5 L V8 | SIL | IMO | RBR | LEC | EST; 5 | | 11th | 10 |
| 2017 | TF Sport | LMGTE | Aston Martin Vantage GTE | Aston Martin 4.5 L V8 | **SIL**; 1 | MNZ; 2 | RBR; 3 | LEC; 2 | SPA; 5 | ALG; 3 | 2nd | 102 |
| 2021 | Racing Team Turkey | LMP2 | Oreca 07 | Gibson GK428 4.2 L V8 | CAT; 15 | **RBR**; 4 | LEC; 6 | MNZ; 7 | SPA; Ret | ALG; WD | 11th | 29.5 |
| 2022 | Racing Team Turkey | LMP2 | Oreca 07 | Gibson GK428 4.2 L V8 | LEC; 6 | IMO; 7 | MNZ; 7 | CAT; 10 | SPA; 6 | **ALG**; 6 | 8th | 38 |
| 2022 | Racing Team Turkey | Pro-Am Cup | Oreca 07 | Gibson GK428 4.2 L V8 | 1 | 1 | 2 | 4 | 1 | 1 | 1st | 131 |
| 2023 | Racing Team Turkey | LMP2 Pro-Am | Oreca 07 | Gibson GK428 4.2 L V8 | **CAT**; 1 | **LEC**; 1 | **ARA**; 9 | **SPA**; 2 | PRT; 6 | ALG; 4 | 3rd | 94 |

=== 24 Hours of Le Mans results ===
| Year | Team | Co-Drivers | Car | Class | Laps | Pos. | Class Pos. |
|---|---|---|---|---|---|---|---|
| 2017 | (United Kingdom) TF Sport | (United Kingdom) Euan Hankey (United Kingdom) Rob Bell | Aston Martin Vantage GTE | GTE; Am | 329 | 35th | 7th |
| 2018 | (United Kingdom) TF Sport | (United Kingdom) Euan Hankey (Republic of Ireland) Charlie Eastwood | Aston Martin Vantage GTE | GTE; Am | 304 | DNF | DNF |
| 2019 | (United Kingdom) TF Sport | (United Kingdom) Euan Hankey (Republic of Ireland) Charlie Eastwood | Aston Martin Vantage GTE | GTE; Am | 327 | 42nd | 11th |
| 2020 | (United Kingdom) TF Sport | (United Kingdom) Jonathan Adam (Republic of Ireland) Charlie Eastwood | Aston Martin Vantage AMR | GTE; Am | 339 | 24th | **1st** |
| 2023 | Racing Team Turkey | (United Kingdom) Tom Gamble (Belgium) Dries Vanthoor | Oreca 07-Gibson | LMP2 | 87 | DNF | DNF |
| 2023 | Racing Team Turkey | (United Kingdom) Tom Gamble (Belgium) Dries Vanthoor | Oreca 07-Gibson | LMP2 Pro-Am | 87 | DNF | DNF |
| 2024 | (United Kingdom) JMW Motorsport | (Italy) Giacomo Petrobelli (Netherlands) Larry ten Voorde | Ferrari 296 GT3 | LMGT3 | 112 | DNF | DNF |
| 2026 | Racing Team Turkey by TF | (Republic of Ireland) Peter Dempsey (Republic of Ireland) Charlie Eastwood | Chevrolet Corvette Z06 GT3.R | LMGT3 | 335 | 38th | 6th |

=== Complete FIA World Endurance Championship results ===
(key) (Races in bold indicate pole position; races in italics indicate fastest lap)

| Year | Entrant | Class | Chassis | Engine | 1 | 2 | 3 | 4 | 5 | 6 | 7 | 8 | Rank | Points |
|---|---|---|---|---|---|---|---|---|---|---|---|---|---|---|
| 2018–19 | TF Sport | LMGTE Am | Aston Martin Vantage GTE | Aston Martin 4.5 L V8 | SPA; 2 | LMS; Ret | SIL; 2 | FUJ; 2 | SHA; 8 | SEB; 6 | **SPA**; 2 | LMS; 6 | 3rd | 99 |
| 2019–20 | TF Sport | LMGTE Am | Aston Martin Vantage AMR | Aston Martin 4.0 L Turbo V8 | **SIL**; 7 | **FUJ**; 1 | SHA; 1 | BHR; Ret | COA; 1 | SPA; 3 | LMS; 1 | BHR; 8 | 2nd | 154 |
| 2026 | Racing Team Turkey by TF | LMGT3 | Chevrolet Corvette Z06 GT3.R | Chevrolet LT6.R 5.5 L V8 | IMO; Ret | SPA; 9 | LMS; 6 | SÃO; 1 | COA | FUJ | CAT | MNZ | 6th* | 43* |

* Season still in progress

=== Complete Asian Le Mans Series results ===
| Year | Entrant | Class | Chassis | Engine | 1 | 2 | 3 | 4 | 5 | 6 | Rank | Points |
|---|---|---|---|---|---|---|---|---|---|---|---|---|
| 2018-2019 | United Autosports | LMP2 | Ligier JS P2 | Nissan VK45 4.5 L V8 | SHA; 3 | **FUJ**; 5 | CHA; 6 | SEP; Ret | | | 8th | 33 |
| 2023 | DKR Engineering | LMP2 | Oreca 07 | Gibson GK428 4.2 L V8 | DUB; 1; 2 | DUB; 2; 2 | ABU; 1; 3 | ABU; 2; 1 | | | 1st | 76 |
| 2023–24 | TF Sport | LMP2 | Oreca 07 | Gibson GK428 4.2 L V8 | **SEP**; **1**; 7 | **SEP**; **2**; 8 | DUB; 5 | ABU; 1; 4 | ABU; 2; 6 | | 8th | 42 |
| 2025–26 | Racing Team Turkey | GT | Chevrolet Corvette Z06 GT3.R | Chevrolet LT6.R 5.5 L V8 | SEP; 1; 8 | SEP; 2; 19 | DUB; 1; 8 | DUB; 2; 9 | ABU; 1 Ret | ABU; 2; 11 | 19th | 13 |

=== Complete IMSA SportsCar Championship results ===
(key) (Races in bold indicate pole position; results in italics indicate fastest lap)

| Year | Team | Class | Make | Engine | 1 | 2 | 3 | 4 | 5 | 6 | 7 | 8 | 9 | 10 | Pos. | Points |
|---|---|---|---|---|---|---|---|---|---|---|---|---|---|---|---|---|
| 2021 | RWR Eurasia | LMP2 | Ligier JS P217 | Gibson GK428 4.2 L V8 | DAY; 4† | SEB | WGL | WGL | ELK | LGA | PET | | | | NC† | 0† |
| 2023 | Tower Motorsport | LMP2 | Oreca 07 | Gibson GK428 4.2 L V8 | DAY | SEB | LGA | WGL; 5 | ELK | IMS | PET | | | | 28th | 260 |
| 2024 | Lone Star Racing | GTD | Mercedes-AMG GT3 Evo | Mercedes-AMG M159 6.2 L V8 | DAY; 8 | SEB; 18 | LBH | LGA | WGL; 20 | MOS | ELK | VIR | IMS; 15 | **PET**; 10 | 38th | 945 |
| 2025 | DXDT Racing | GTD | Chevrolet Corvette Z06 GT3.R | Chevrolet LT6.R 5.5 L V8 | DAY; 19 | SEB; 8 | LBH | LGA | WGL; 15 | MOS | ELK | VIR | IMS; 17 | PET; 7 | 29th | 992 |
| 2026 | DXDT Racing | GTD | Chevrolet Corvette Z06 GT3.R | Chevrolet LT6.R 5.5 L V8 | DAY; 17 | SEB; 9 | LBH | LGA | WGL; 11 | MOS | ELK | VIR | IMS | PET; 3 | 38th | 928 |

^{†} Points only counted towards the Michelin Endurance Cup, and not the overall LMP2 Championship.

=== Complete Formula Regional Asian Championship results ===
(key) (Races in bold indicate pole position) (Races in italics indicate the fastest lap of top ten finishers)

| Year | Entrant | 1 | 2 | 3 | 4 | 5 | 6 | 7 | 8 | 9 | 10 | 11 | 12 | 13 | 14 | 15 | DC | Points |
|---|---|---|---|---|---|---|---|---|---|---|---|---|---|---|---|---|---|---|
| 2022 | Pinnacle Motorsport | ABU; 1; 17 | ABU; 2 Ret | ABU; 3 Ret | DUB; 1; 23 | DUB; 2; 21 | DUB; 3; 21 | DUB; 1; 25 | DUB; 2; 22 | DUB; 3; 21 | DUB; 1; 21 | DUB; 2; 24 | DUB; 3; 26† | ABU; 1; 25 | ABU; 2; 21 | ABU; 3; 24 | 36th | 0 |

=== Complete GT World Challenge Europe Sprint Cup results ===
(key) (Races in bold indicate pole position; results in italics indicate fastest lap)

| Year | Team | Car | Class | 1 | 2 | 3 | 4 | 5 | 6 | 7 | 8 | 9 | 10 | Pos. | Points |
|---|---|---|---|---|---|---|---|---|---|---|---|---|---|---|---|
| 2024 | Racing Team Turkey | Ferrari 296 GT3 | Gold | BRH; 1; 21 | BRH; 2; 20 | MIS; 1; 22 | MIS; 2; 16 | HOC; 1 | HOC; 2 | MAG; 1 | MAG; 2 | CAT; 1 | CAT; 2 | 7th | 32 |

Sporting positions
| Preceded by Lewis Williamson; Nick Leventis; Chris Buncombe | Blancpain GT Series Endurance Cup; Pro-Am Champion; 2019; With: Charlie Eastwood & Ahmad Al Harthy | Succeeded by Chris Goodwin; Alexander West (GT World Challenge Europe Endurance Cup) |
