= Genesis G8MR engine =

Overview
- Manufacturer: Hyundai Motorsport
- Designer: Julien Moncet
- Production: 2026–present

Layout
- Configuration: V8
- Displacement: 3.194 L (195 cu in)
- Cylinder bore: 83 mm (3.3 in)
- Piston stroke: 73.8 mm (3 in)
- Valvetrain: 32-valve (four-valves per cylinder), DOHC

Combustion
- Turbocharger: Twin-turbocharged
- Fuel system: Gasoline direct injection
- Fuel type: TotalEnergies
- Oil system: Dry sump. Lubricants supplied by Shell Helix

The Genesis G8MR engine is a twin-turbocharged, four-stroke, 3.2-liter V8 racing engine made by Hyundai Motorsport for use in the Genesis GMR-001 LMDh race car since 2026.

== Overview ==
Hyundai Motorsport developed the bespoke engine for the new-for-2026 Genesis GMR-001 LMDh. Work on the engine began in June 2024, with the basic architecture based on the 1.6 L (1,600 cc) inline four-cylinder engine found in the Hyundai i20 N Rally1 and shares roughly 60% of the parts. In accordance with the LMDh rules, the G8MR internal combustion engine is connected to the standardized hybrid drivetrain components provided by Bosch (motor generator unit), Williams Advanced Engineering (battery pack), and an Xtrac P1359 gearbox.

== Applications ==
- Genesis GMR-001

== See also ==
- List of Hyundai engines
