= FIA Platinum Categorisation =

Tier of the FIA Drivers' Categorisation

Platinum Categorisation is the highest category within the FIA Driver Categorisation. The FIA Drivers' Categorisation is a system created by Fédération Internationale de l'Automobile that lists drivers on the basis of their achievements, performances and age. This categorization is used in sports car racing championships such as the FIA World Endurance Championship and the IMSA SportsCar Championship.

Drivers' categorisations are revised annually and published in November.

== Requirements ==
=== Competition results ===
To qualify for Platinum categorisation, a driver must have finished in the top five of the general classification for an FIA Tier 1 championship. These include the Supercars Championship, FIA Formula 2, Formula E, IndyCar Series, Super Formula, and any other FIA World Championship. (Note: Only the 2025 series names are listed in this summary; the historical equivalent series is also counted in most cases.)

Additionally, if a driver has been categorised previously, the following achievements would warrant a promotion to Platinum:

- Finishing on the podium in a Pro category of a major endurance race (24 Hours of Le Mans, 24 Hours of Daytona (GTP), 24 Hours of Spa, Nürburgring 24 Hours).
- Winning the FIA World Endurance Championship in the Hypercar category.
- Winning the IMSA SportsCar Championship in the GTP category.
- Winning the GT World Challenge Europe, Asia and America, and Pro category in a major endurance race.

=== Other requirements ===
Drivers who currently hold, or have previously held an FIA Super Licence, are automatically eligible for Platinum Categorisation. Performances and achievements may be considered as Platinum, despite not being covered by one of the definitions above, under the discretion of the FIA. Furthermore, no driver over 55 may be platinum categorised, with drivers being demoted to Gold Categorisation following their 55th birthday.

== Current drivers ==
As of May 2026, this is the list of the 232 drivers who hold a Platinum license, as published by the FIA.

Name	Country	Current / most recent series	Ref.
Jonathan Adam	United Kingdom	2026 FIA World Endurance Championship	
Jack Aitken	United Kingdom	2026 FIA World Endurance Championship / 2026 IMSA SportsCar Championship	
Filipe Albuquerque	Portugal	2026 IMSA SportsCar Championship	
Mikhail Aleshin	Russia (Note: Though actively competing under a neutral flag, Russian athletes are registered as competing for the Russian Automobile Federation by the FIA, following to the worldwide sporting ban applied to Russian athletes in response to the state-sponsored doping program.)	2018–19 FIA World Endurance Championship / 2019 Blancpain GT Series Endurance Cup	
Fernando Alonso	Spain	2026 Formula One World Championship	
Michael Ammermüller	Germany	2022 Porsche Carrera Cup Germany / 2022 Porsche Supercup	
Lucas Auer	Austria	2026 Deutsche Tourenwagen Masters	
Klaus Bachler	Austria	2026 IMSA SportsCar Championship	
Bertrand Baguette	Belgium	2026 Super GT Series	
Earl Bamber	New Zealand	2026 FIA World Endurance Championship / 2026 IMSA SportsCar Championship	
Ben Barnicoat	United Kingdom	2026 IMSA SportsCar Championship / 2026 British GT Championship	
Robert Bell	United Kingdom	2023–24 Asian Le Mans Series / 2024 GT World Challenge Europe Endurance Cup	
Jörg Bergmeister	Germany	2019–20 FIA World Endurance Championship	
Timo Bernhard	Germany	2019 IMSA SportsCar Championship	
Sam Bird	United Kingdom	2024–25 Formula E World Championship	
Tom Blomqvist	United Kingdom	2026 IMSA SportsCar Championship	
Mirko Bortolotti	Italy	2026 Deutsche Tourenwagen Masters	
Sébastien Bourdais	France	2026 FIA World Endurance Championship	
Ryan Briscoe	Australia	2023 FIA World Endurance Championship	
Gianmaria Bruni	Italy	2025 European Le Mans Series / 2025 IMSA SportsCar Championship	
Sébastien Buemi	Switzerland	2025–26 Formula E World Championship / 2026 FIA World Endurance Championship	
Maximilian Buhk	Germany	2022 Deutsche Tourenwagen Masters	
Jenson Button	United Kingdom	2025 FIA World Endurance Championship	
Yelmer Buurman	Netherlands	2025–26 Asian Le Mans Series	
Bastian Buus (Note: This driver is currently Gold categorised, but is set to be upgraded in 2026.)	Denmark	2026 Deutsche Tourenwagen Masters	
Matteo Cairoli	Italy	2026 Deutsche Tourenwagen Masters	
James Calado	United Kingdom	2026 FIA World Endurance Championship	
Andrea Caldarelli	Italy	2026 IMSA SportsCar Championship	
Dane Cameron	United States	2026 IMSA SportsCar Championship / 2026 European Le Mans Series	
Matt Campbell	Australia	2026 IMSA SportsCar Championship	
Nick Cassidy	New Zealand	2025–26 Formula E World Championship / 2026 FIA World Endurance Championship	
Hélio Castroneves	Brazil	2025 IndyCar Series	
Nicky Catsburg	Netherlands	2026 FIA World Endurance Championship / 2026 IMSA SportsCar Championship	
Henrique Chaves	Portugal	2026 GT World Challenge Europe Endurance Cup / 2026 International GT Open	
Max Chilton	United Kingdom	2021 IndyCar Series	
Michael Christensen	Denmark	2026 Nürburgring Langstrecken-Serie	
Franco Colapinto	Argentina	2026 Formula One World Championship	
Mike Conway	United Kingdom	2026 FIA World Endurance Championship	
Albert Costa	Spain	2026 IMSA SportsCar Championship	
Anthony Davidson	United Kingdom	2021 FIA World Endurance Championship	
João Paulo de Oliveira	Brazil	2026 Super GT Series	
Nyck de Vries	Netherlands	2025–26 Formula E World Championship / 2026 FIA World Endurance Championship	
Jake Dennis	United Kingdom	2025–26 Formula E World Championship	
Luis Felipe Derani	Brazil	2026 FIA World Endurance Championship	
Lucas di Grassi	Brazil	2025–26 Formula E World Championship	
Paul di Resta	United Kingdom	2026 FIA World Endurance Championship / 2026 IMSA SportsCar Championship	
Scott Dixon	New Zealand	2026 IndyCar Series	
Jack Doohan	Australia	2026 European Le Mans Series	
Mattia Drudi	Italy	2026 FIA World Endurance Championship	
Felipe Drugovich	Brazil	2025–26 Formula E World Championship	
Romain Dumas	France	2024 Dakar Rally	
Loïc Duval	France	2026 FIA World Endurance Championship	
John Edwards	United States	2023 IMSA SportsCar Championship / 2023 GT World Challenge America	
Chase Elliott	United States	2026 NASCAR Cup Series	
Philipp Eng	Austria	2026 IMSA SportsCar Championship	
Maro Engel	Germany	2026 Deutsche Tourenwagen Masters	
Christian Engelhart	Germany	2026 Nürburgring Langstrecken-Serie	
Marcus Ericsson	Sweden	2026 IndyCar Series	
Joel Eriksson	Sweden	2025–26 Formula E World Championship	
Kévin Estre	France	2026 IMSA SportsCar Championship	
Mitch Evans	New Zealand	2025–26 Formula E World Championship	
Augusto Farfus	Brazil	2026 FIA World Endurance Championship	
Marcel Fässler	Switzerland	2020 WeatherTech SportsCar Championship	
António Félix da Costa	Portugal	2025–26 Formula E World Championship / 2026 FIA World Endurance Championship	
Ricardo Feller	Switzerland	2026 Deutsche Tourenwagen Masters	
Sacha Fenestraz	Argentina	2026 Super GT Series / 2026 Super Formula Championship	
Giancarlo Fisichella	Italy	2024 Italian GT Championship	
Pietro Fittipaldi	Brazil	2026 European Le Mans Series / 2026 IMSA SportsCar Championship	
Norberto Fontana	Argentina	2026 Turismo Cartera	
Robin Frijns	Netherlands	2026 FIA World Endurance Championship	
Antonio Fuoco	Italy	2026 FIA World Endurance Championship / 2026 European Le Mans Series	
Antonio García	Spain	2026 IMSA SportsCar Championship	
Luca Ghiotto	Italy	2026 European Le Mans Series	
Antonio Giovinazzi	Italy	2026 FIA World Endurance Championship	
Timo Glock	Germany	2026 Deutsche Tourenwagen Masters	
Tristan Gommendy	France	2021 European Le Mans Series	
Maximilian Götz	Germany	2026 GT World Challenge Europe Endurance Cup	
Jules Gounon	France	2026 FIA World Endurance Championship / 2026 Deutsche Tourenwagen Masters	
Ben Green	United Kingdom	2026 GT World Challenge Europe Sprint Cup	
James Green	United Kingdom	2020 Deutsche Tourenwagen Masters	
Romain Grosjean	France	2026 IndyCar Series	
Esteban Guerrieri	Argentina	2026 TCR World Tour	
Ross Gunn	United Kingdom	2026 IMSA SportsCar Championship	
Maximilian Günther	Germany	2025–26 Formula E World Championship	
Esteban Gutierrez	Mexico	2022 FIA World Endurance Championship	
Ayhancan Güven	Turkey	2026 FIA World Endurance Championship	
Christopher Haase	Germany	2026 GT World Challenge Europe Endurance Cup / 2026 Nürburgring Langstrecken-Serie	
Timmy Hansen	Sweden	2025 FIA World Rallycross Championship	
Dan Harper	United Kingdom	2026 FIA World Endurance Championship	
Brendon Hartley	New Zealand	2026 FIA World Endurance Championship	
Rio Haryanto	Indonesia	2019–20 Asian Le Mans Series	
Colton Herta	United States	2026 Formula 2 Championship	
Ryo Hirakawa	Japan	2026 FIA World Endurance Championship	
Kohei Hirate	Japan	2025 Super GT Series / 2025 Super Taikyu Series	
Nico Hülkenberg	Germany	2026 Formula One World Championship	
Ryan Hunter-Reay	United States	2025 IndyCar Series	
Callum Ilott	United Kingdom	2026 IMSA SportsCar Championship	
Hiroaki Ishiura	Japan	2026 Super GT Series	
Mathieu Jaminet	France	2026 FIA World Endurance Championship	
Neel Jani	Switzerland	2025 IMSA SportsCar Championship / 2025 FIA World Endurance Championship	
Oliver Jarvis	United Kingdom	2026 European Le Mans Series	
Mikkel Jensen	Denmark	2026 IMSA SportsCar Championship	
Jimmie Johnson	United States	2026 NASCAR Cup Series	
Daniel Juncadella	Spain	2026 FIA World Endurance Championship	
Tony Kanaan	Brazil	2023 Stock Car Pro Series	
Marvin Kirchhöfer	Germany	2026 FIA World Endurance Championship	
Christian Klien	Austria	2023 GT World Challenge Europe Sprint Cup	
Kamui Kobayashi	Japan	2026 FIA World Endurance Championship / 2026 Super Formula Championship	
Heikki Kovalainen	Finland	2021 Super GT Series	
Robert Kubica	Poland	2026 FIA World Endurance Championship	
Yuji Kunimoto	Japan	2026 Super GT Series / 2026 Super Taikyu Series	
Daniil Kvyat	Russia	2026 Super GT Series	
Nicolas Lapierre	France	2024 FIA World Endurance Championship	
Côme Ledogar	France	2024 Nürburgring Langstrecken-Serie	
Richard Lietz	Austria	2026 FIA World Endurance Championship / 2026 European Le Mans Series	
Patrick Long	United States	2021 IMSA SportsCar Championship	
José María López	Argentina	2026 FIA World Endurance Championship	
André Lotterer	Germany	2026 FIA World Endurance Championship	
Craig Lowndes	Australia	2025 Supercars Championship	
Alex Lynn	United Kingdom	2025 FIA World Endurance Championship	
Kevin Magnussen	Denmark	2026 FIA World Endurance Championship / 2026 IMSA SportsCar Championship	
Frédéric Makowiecki	France	2026 FIA World Endurance Championship	
Pastor Maldonado	Venezuela	2018–19 FIA World Endurance Championship	
Marco Mapelli	Italy	2026 Deutsche Tourenwagen Masters	
Raffaele Marciello	Italy	2026 FIA World Endurance Championship	
Dennis Marschall	Germany	2026 GT World Challenge Europe Endurance Cup	
Maxime Martin	Belgium	2026 FIA World Endurance Championship	
Felipe Massa	Brazil	2026 Stock Car Pro Series	
Tsugio Matsuda	Japan	2025 Super GT Series	
Nikita Mazepin	Russia	2023–24 Asian Le Mans Series	
Scott McLaughlin	New Zealand	2026 IndyCar Series	
Jaime Melo	Brazil	2017 Italian GT Championship	
Gustavo Menezes	United States	2025–26 Asian Le Mans Series	
Roberto Merhi	Spain	2026 GT World Challenge Europe Endurance Cup	
Norbert Michelisz	Hungary	2026 TCR World Tour	
Christopher Mies	Germany	2026 IMSA SportsCar Championship	
Charles Milesi	France	2026 FIA World Endurance Championship / 2026 European Le Mans Series	
Tommy Milner	United States	2026 IMSA SportsCar Championship	
Sandy Mitchell	United Kingdom	2026 IMSA SportsCar Championship	
Ritomo Miyata	Japan	2026 Formula 2 Championship	
Miguel Molina	Spain	2026 FIA World Endurance Championship	
Juan Pablo Montoya	Colombia	2023 European Le Mans Series	
Edoardo Mortara	Italy	2025–26 Formula E World Championship	
Chaz Mostert	Australia	2026 Supercars Championship	
Dirk Müller	Germany	2025 Nürburgring Langstrecken-Serie	
Nico Müller	Switzerland	2025–26 Formula E World Championship	
Hideki Mutoh	Japan	2022 Super GT Series	
Kazuki Nakajima	Japan	2021 FIA World Endurance Championship	
Felipe Nasr	Brazil	2026 IMSA SportsCar Championship	
Josef Newgarden	United States	2026 IndyCar Series	
Patric Niederhauser	Switzerland	2026 GT World Challenge Europe Endurance Cup	
Nicklas Nielsen	Denmark	2026 FIA World Endurance Championship	
Lando Norris	United Kingdom	2026 Formula One World Championship	
Patricio O'Ward	Mexico	2026 IndyCar Series	
Sébastien Ogier	France	2026 World Rally Championship	
Dennis Olsen	Norway	2026 IMSA SportsCar Championship	
Kazuya Oshima	Japan	2026 Super GT Series / 2026 Super Taikyu Series	
Gary Paffett	United Kingdom	2018–19 Formula E Championship	
Simon Pagenaud	France	2023 IndyCar Series	
Álex Palou	Spain	2026 IndyCar Series	
Álvaro Parente	Portugal	2024 24H Series	
Jordan Pepper	South Africa	2026 Deutsche Tourenwagen Masters / 2026 GT World Challenge Europe Endurance Cup	
Franck Perera	France	2026 GT World Challenge Europe Endurance Cup	
Vitaly Petrov	Russia	2018–19 FIA World Endurance Championship	
Alessandro Pier Guidi	Italy	2026 FIA World Endurance Championship	
Patrick Pilet	France	2025 Nürburgring Langstrecken-Serie	
Nelson Piquet Jr.	Brazil	2026 Stock Car Pro Series	
Olivier Pla	France	2024–25 Asian Le Mans Series	
Théo Pourchaire	France	2026 FIA World Endurance Championship	
Will Power	Australia	2026 IndyCar Series	
Thomas Preining	Austria	2026 Deutsche Tourenwagen Masters	
Nicolas Prost	France	2025 Middle East Trophy	
René Rast	Germany	2026 FIA World Endurance Championship / 2026 Deutsche Tourenwagen Masters	
Davide Rigon	Italy	2026 European Le Mans Series	
Mike Rockenfeller	Germany	2026 European Le Mans Series	
Alexander Rossi	United States	2026 IndyCar Series	
Matías Rossi	Argentina	2025 Turismo Carretera	
James Rossiter	United Kingdom	2022 FIA World Endurance Championship	
Kalle Rovanperä	Finland	2026 Formula Regional Oceania Trophy	
Alessio Rovera	Italy	2026 FIA World Endurance Championship / 2026 GT World Challenge Europe Endurance Cup	
Oliver Rowland	United Kingdom	2025–26 Formula E World Championship	
Logan Sargeant	United States	2026 FIA World Endurance Championship	
Timo Scheider	Germany	2024 Extreme E Championship	
Mick Schumacher	Germany	2026 IndyCar Series	
Bruno Senna	Brazil	2019–20 FIA World Endurance Championship	
Daniel Serra	Brazil	2026 Stock Car Pro Series	
Robert Shwartzman	Israel (Note: Shwartzman previously competed under the Russian flag.)	2025 IndyCar Series	
Alexander Sims	United Kingdom	2026 IMSA SportsCar Championship	
Sergey Sirotkin	Russia	2025 Middle East Trophy	
Marco Sørensen	Denmark	2026 FIA World Endurance Championship	
Andy Soucek	Spain	2021 International GT Open	
Scott Speed	United States	2021 Nitro Rallycross Championship	
Bruno Spengler	Canada	2024 Italian GT Championship / 2024 Super GT Series	
Richie Stanaway	New Zealand	2025 Supercars Championship	
Will Stevens	United Kingdom	2026 FIA World Endurance Championship	
Frank Stippler	Germany	2026 Nürburgring Langstrecken-Serie	
Luca Stolz	Germany	2026 GT World Challenge Europe Endurance Cup	
Lance Stroll	Canada	2026 Formula One World Championship	
Garth Tander	Australia	2022 GT World Challenge Australia	
Nick Tandy	United Kingdom	2026 IMSA SportsCar Championship	
Jordan Taylor	United States	2026 IMSA SportsCar Championship	
Ricky Taylor	United States	2026 IMSA SportsCar Championship	
Nicki Thiim	Denmark	2026 Deutsche Tourenwagen Masters	
Harry Tincknell	United Kingdom	2026 FIA World Endurance Championship	
Martin Tomczyk	Germany	2021 GT World Challenge Europe Endurance Cup	
Benoît Tréluyer	France	2020 Deutsche Tourenwagen Masters	
Sho Tsuboi	Japan	2026 Super GT Series / 2026 Super Formula Championship	
Davide Valsecchi	Italy	2016 Blancpain GT Series Sprint Cup	
Giedo van der Garde	Netherlands	2023 IMSA SportsCar Championship	
Kelvin van der Linde	South Africa	2026 Deutsche Tourenwagen Masters	
Sheldon van der Linde	South Africa	2026 FIA World Endurance Championship / 2026 IMSA SportsCar Championship	
Renger van der Zande	Netherlands	2026 IMSA SportsCar Championship	
Shane van Gisbergen	New Zealand	2026 NASCAR Cup Series	
Stoffel Vandoorne	Belgium	2026 FIA World Endurance Championship	
Dries Vanthoor	Belgium	2026 FIA World Endurance Championship / 2026 IMSA SportsCar Championship	
Laurens Vanthoor	Belgium	2026 IMSA SportsCar Championship	
Jean-Éric Vergne	France	2025–26 Formula E World Championship	
Jean-Karl Vernay	France	2024 FIA World Endurance Championship	
Max Verstappen	Netherlands	2026 Formula One World Championship	
Frederik Vesti	Denmark	2026 IMSA SportsCar Championship	
Christian Vietoris	Germany	2018 Blancpain GT Series Endurance Cup	
Toni Vilander	Finland	2022 FIA World Endurance Championship	
Jacques Villeneuve	Canada	2023 FIA World Endurance Championship	
Cam Waters	Australia	2026 Supercars Championship	
Charles Weerts	Belgium	2026 GT World Challenge Europe Endurance Cup	
Pascal Wehrlein	Germany	2025–26 Formula E World Championship	
Dirk Werner	Germany	2021 Nürburgring Langstrecken Serie	
Richard Westbrook	United Kingdom	2024 IMSA SportsCar Championship / 2024 FIA World Endurance Championship	
Jamie Whincup	Australia	2021 Supercars Championship	
Markus Winkelhock	Germany	2026 Nürburgring Langstrecken-Serie	
Marco Wittmann	Germany	2026 IMSA SportsCar Championship / 2026 Deutsche Tourenwagen Masters	
Naoki Yamamoto	Japan	2026 Super GT Series	
Kenta Yamashita	Japan	2026 Super GT Series / 2026 Super Formula Championship	
Nick Yelloly	United Kingdom	2026 European Le Mans Series / 2026 IMSA SportsCar Championship	
