= 2021 TC America Series =

Racing series

The 2021 TC America Series Powered by Skip Barber Racing School was the third season of the TC America Series. The season began on 5 March at Sonoma Raceway and ended on 17 October at Indianapolis Motor Speedway.

In a change from the 2020 series, the TCR class, already racing in several other North American series, left TC America. It was replaced by the one-make TCX class based on the BMW M2 CS Racing Cup that races as part of the Nürburgring Endurance Series.

== Calendar ==
The final calendar was announced on 3 October 2020, featuring seven rounds. The round at Canadian Tire Motorsports Park was later canceled. In June, Sebring International Raceway was announced as the CTMP round's replacement.

Round	Circuit	Date
1	(United States) Sonoma Raceway, Sonoma, California	5–7 March
2	(United States) Circuit of the Americas, Elroy, Texas	30 April-2 May
3	(United States) Virginia International Raceway, Alton, Virginia	4–6 June
4	(United States) Road America, Elkhart Lake, Wisconsin	27–29 August
5	(United States) Watkins Glen International, Watkins Glen, New York	17–19 September
6	(United States) Sebring International Raceway, Sebring, Florida	1–3 October
7	(United States) Indianapolis Motor Speedway, Speedway, Indiana	15–17 October
Cancelled due to the COVID-19 pandemic
	Circuit	Original Date
	(Canada) Canadian Tire Motorsports Park, Bowmanville, Ontario	21–23 May

== Entry list ==
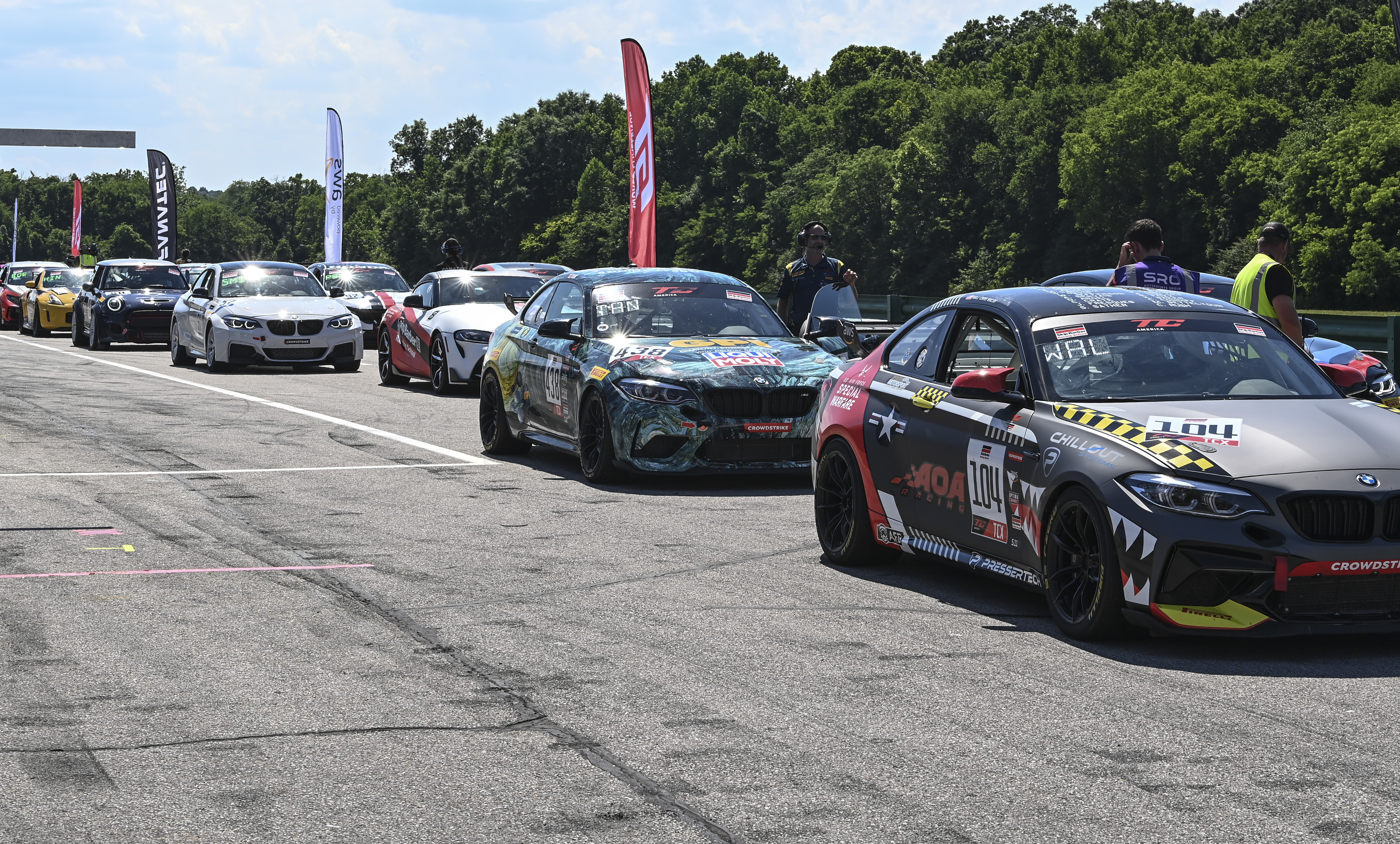
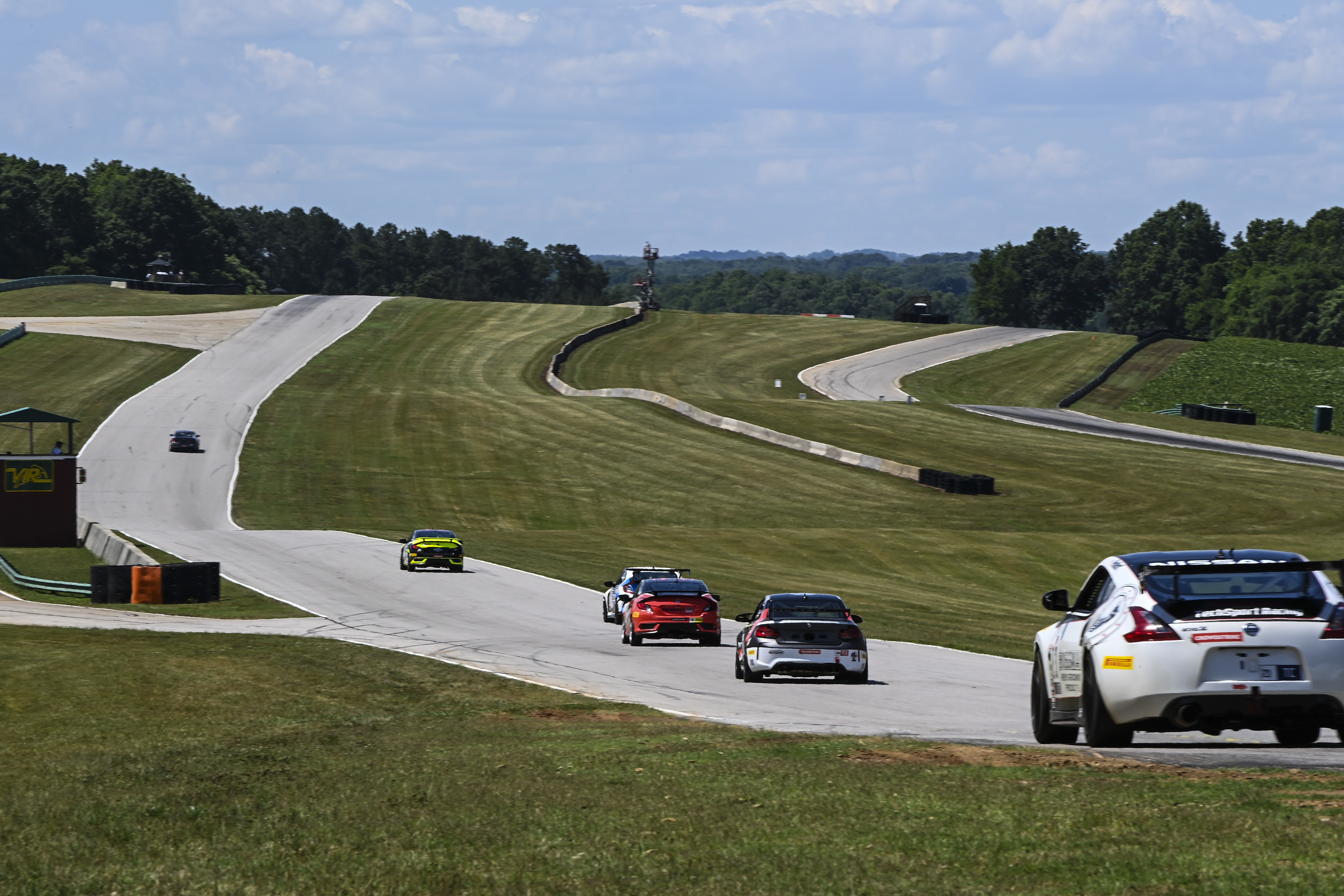
2021 TC America Series at Virginia International Raceway June 4, 2021

Team	Car	No.	Drivers	Rounds
TCX entries
(United States) Classic BMW	BMW M2 ClubSport Racing	3	(United States) Olivia Askew	3–4, 6–7
(United States) Classic BMW	BMW M2 ClubSport Racing	27	(United States) Tommy McCarthy	1
(United States) Classic BMW	BMW M2 ClubSport Racing	50	(United States) John Hennessy	2, 4
(United States) Classic BMW	BMW M2 ClubSport Racing	54	(United States) Garrett Adams	6
(United States) Classic BMW	BMW M2 ClubSport Racing	81	(United States) Jacob Ruud	All
(United States) KMW Motorsports with TMR Engineering	BMW M2 ClubSport Racing	5	(Argentina) Roy Block	All
(United States) Hard Motorsport	BMW M2 ClubSport Racing	30	(United States) Steve Streimer	2–7
(United States) Rigid Speed	BMW M2 ClubSport Racing	38	(United States) Joseph Catania	5
(United States) Rigid Speed	BMW M2 ClubSport Racing	38	(United States) Lucas Catania (Note: Joseph Catania competed in the first race at Watkins Glen, while Lucas Catania competed in the second.)	5
(United States) Accelerating Performance	BMW M2 ClubSport Racing	57	(United States) Stephen Cugliari	4, 6
(United States) AOA Racing	BMW M2 ClubSport Racing	104	(United States) Chris Walsh	3
(Canada) ST Racing	BMW M2 ClubSport Racing	438	(Canada) Samantha Tan	2–3
TC entries
(United States) Garagistic with DRS	BMW M240i Racing Cup	06	(United States) Matthew Ibrahim	3–7
(United States) Garagistic with DRS	BMW M240i Racing Cup	09	(United States) Kris Valdez	3–7
(Puerto Rico) VGMC	Honda Civic Type-R TC	8	(Puerto Rico) Victor Gonzalez Jr.	1
(United States) DXDT Racing	Honda Civic Type-R TC	9	(United States) Kevin Boehm	All
(United States) TechSport Racing	Nissan 370Z	21	(United States) Rob Hines	2–7
(United States) TechSport Racing	Nissan 370Z	23	(United States) Rob Hines	1
(United States) TechSport Racing	Nissan 370Z	23	(United States) Joseph Federl	2–3
(United States) Classic BMW	BMW M240i Racing Cup	26	(United States) Toby Grahovec	1–2
(United States) Skip Barber Racing School	Honda Civic Type-R TC	28	(United States) Ken Fukuda	5, 7
(United States) Skip Barber Racing School	Honda Civic Type-R TC	28	(United States) Mike Ogren	6
(United States) Skip Barber Racing School	Honda Civic Type-R TC	29	(United States) Lindsay Brewer	1–4
(United States) Skip Barber Racing School	Honda Civic Type-R TC	92	(United States) Eric Powell	All
(United States) Hard Motorsport	BMW M240i Racing Cup	30	(United States) Steve Streimer	1
(United States) Hard Motorsport	BMW M240i Racing Cup	31	(United States) Adam Harding	1–3
(United States) LA Honda World Racing	Honda Civic Type-R TC	37	(United States) Mike LaMarra	1–2, 4–7
(United States) LA Honda World Racing	Honda Civic Type-R TC	73	(United States) Frank Szczesniak	1–4
(United States) Auto Technic Racing	BMW M240i Racing Cup	51	(United States) Austen Smith	All
(United States) Auto Technic Racing	BMW M240i Racing Cup	52	(United States) Tom Capizzi	All
(United States) MINI JCW Team	Mini Cooper GP3	60	(United States) Mark Pombo	2–3
(United States) MINI JCW Team	Mini Cooper GP3	60	(United States) Derek Jones	4–7
(United States) FTG Racing	Mazda3 TC	70	(United States) Joey Jordan	1
(United States) GenRacer	Hyundai Veloster N TC	78	(United States) Jeff Ricca	All
(United States) GenRacer	Hyundai Veloster N TC	88	(United States) Michael Sousa	1, 4, 6
(United States) GenRacer	Hyundai Veloster N TC	88	(United States) Kurt Washeim	2–3, 5
(United States) GenRacer	Hyundai Veloster N TC	88	(United States) Nicholas Barbato	7
TCA entries
(United States) Skip Barber Racing School	Honda Civic Si	2	(United States) Mike Stillwagon	1–2
(United States) Skip Barber Racing School	Honda Civic Si	2	(United States) Colin Harrison	3–7
(United States) Skip Barber Racing School	Honda Civic Si	16	(United States) Carter Fartuch	All
(United States) Skip Barber Racing School	Honda Civic Si	20	(United States) Mike Stillwagon	5, 7
(United States) Forbush Performance	Hyundai Veloster Turbo TCA	18	(United States) Caleb Bacon	All
(United States) Forbush Performance	Hyundai Veloster Turbo TCA	33	(United States) Luke Rumberg	2–7
(United States) TechSport Racing	Toyota GT 86 TCA	22	(United States) Jesse Love	1–2, 4–5, 7
(United States) TechSport Racing	Toyota GT 86 TCA	22	(United States) Michael Carter	3
(United States) TechSport Racing	Toyota GT 86 TCA	22	(United States) Devon Anderson (Note: Jesse Love competed in the first race at Road America, while Anderson competed in the second.)	4, 6
(United States) TechSport Racing	Toyota GT 86 TCA	24	(United States) Sammy Smith	1
(United States) TechSport Racing	Toyota GT 86 TCA	24	(United States) Joseph Federl (Note: Sammy Smith competed in the first race at Sonoma, while Federl competed in the second.)	1
(United States) TechSport Racing	Toyota GT 86 TCA	25	(Canada) PJ Groenke	All
(United States) Copeland Motorsports	Mazda MX-5 Cup	41	(United States) Luca Mars	6
(United States) Mini JCW Team	Mini Cooper JCW	61	(United States) Mark Pombo	1
(United States) Mini JCW Team	Mini Cooper JCW	61	(United States) Derek Jones	2–3
(United States) Mini JCW Team	Mini Cooper JCW	61	(United States) Cristian Perocarpi	7
(United States) Mini JCW Team	Mini Cooper JCW	62	(United States) Clayton Williams	1–2, 4–5, 7
(United States) Mini JCW Team	Mini Cooper JCW	62	(United States) Mike LaMarra	3
(United States) Mini JCW Team	Mini Cooper JCW	62	(United States) Cristian Perocarpi	6
(United States) LA Honda World Racing	Honda Civic Si	77	(United States) Mario Biundo	All
(United States) Bryan Herta Autosport	Hyundai Elantra N Line	98	(United States) Taylor Hagler	7
(Puerto Rico) VGMC	Honda Civic Si	99	(Puerto Rico) Jose Blanco	All
(United States) Team Sally Racing	Honda Civic Si	780	(United States) Sally McNulty	All

== Race results ==
Bold indicates overall winner.

Round		Circuit	Pole position	TCX Winners	TC Winners	TCA Winners
1	R1	(United States) Sonoma	(United States) No. 81 Classic BMW	(United States) **No. 81 Classic BMW**	(United States) No. 92 Skip Barber Racing School	(United States) No. 22 TechSport Racing
1	R1	(United States) Sonoma	(United States) Jacob Ruud	(United States) **Jacob Ruud**	(United States) Eric Powell	(United States) Jesse Love
1	R2	(United States) Sonoma		(United States) **No. 81 Classic BMW**	(United States) No. 9 DXDT Racing	(United States) No. 22 TechSport Racing
1	R2	(United States) Sonoma		(United States) **Jacob Ruud**	(United States) Kevin Boehm	(United States) Jesse Love
2	R1	(United States) Austin	(United States) No. 81 Classic BMW	(United States) No. 81 Classic BMW	(United States) **No. 78 GenRacer**	(United States) No. 18 Forbush Performance
2	R1	(United States) Austin	(United States) Jacob Ruud	(United States) Jacob Ruud	(United States) **Jeff Ricca**	(United States) Caleb Bacon
2	R2	(United States) Austin		**(United States) No. 81 Classic BMW**	(United States) No. 9 DXDT Racing	(United States) No. 18 Forbush Performance
2	R2	(United States) Austin		**(United States) Jacob Ruud**	(United States) Kevin Boehm	(United States) Caleb Bacon
3	R1	(United States) Virginia	(United States) No. 81 Classic BMW	**(United States) No. 81 Classic BMW**	(United States) No. 51 Auto Technic Racing	(United States) No. 18 Forbush Performance
3	R1	(United States) Virginia	(United States) Jacob Ruud	**(United States) Jacob Ruud**	(United States) Austen Smith	(United States) Caleb Bacon
3	R2	(United States) Virginia		**(United States) No. 81 Classic BMW**	(United States) No. 51 Auto Technic Racing	(United States) No. 33 Forbush Performance
3	R2	(United States) Virginia		**(United States) Jacob Ruud**	(United States) Austen Smith	(United States) Luke Rumburg
4	R1	(United States) Road America	(United States) No. 81 Classic BMW	**(United States) No. 81 Classic BMW**	(United States) No. 51 Auto Technic Racing	(United States) No. 16 Skip Barber Racing School
4	R1	(United States) Road America	(United States) Jacob Ruud	**(United States) Jacob Ruud**	(United States) Austen Smith	(United States) Carter Fartuch
4	R2	(United States) Road America		**(United States) No. 57 Accelerating Performance**	(United States) No. 92 Skip Barber Racing School	(United States) No. 16 Skip Barber Racing School
4	R2	(United States) Road America		**(United States) Stephen Cugliari**	(United States) Eric Powell	(United States) Carter Fartuch
5	R1	(United States) Watkins Glen	(United States) No. 81 Classic BMW	**(United States) No. 30 Hard Motorsport**	(United States) No. 92 Skip Barber Racing School	(United States) No. 16 Skip Barber Racing School
5	R1	(United States) Watkins Glen	(United States) Jacob Ruud	**(United States) Steve Streimer**	(United States) Eric Powell	(United States) Carter Fartuch
5	R2	(United States) Watkins Glen		**(United States) No. 81 Classic BMW**	(United States) No. 92 Skip Barber Racing School	(United States) No. 18 Forbush Performance
5	R2	(United States) Watkins Glen		**(United States) Jacob Ruud**	(United States) Eric Powell	(United States) Caleb Bacon
6	R1	(United States) Sebring	(United States) No. 81 Classic BMW	**(United States) No. 57 Accelerating Performance**	(United States) No. 51 Auto Technic Racing	(United States) No. 33 Forbush Performance
6	R1	(United States) Sebring	(United States) Jacob Ruud	**(United States) Stephen Cugliari**	(United States) Austen Smith	(United States) Luke Rumburg
6	R2	(United States) Sebring		**(United States) No. 57 Accelerating Performance**	(United States) No. 51 Auto Technic Racing	(United States) No. 22 TechSport Racing
6	R2	(United States) Sebring		**(United States) Stephen Cugliari**	(United States) Austen Smith	(United States) Devin Anderson
7	R1	(United States) Indianapolis	(United States) No. 81 Classic BMW	**(United States) No. 81 Classic BMW**	(United States) No. 37 LA Honda World Racing	(United States) No. 62 MINI JCW Team
7	R1	(United States) Indianapolis	(United States) Jacob Ruud	**(United States) Jacob Ruud**	(United States) Mike LaMarra	(United States) Clayton Williams
7	R2	(United States) Indianapolis		**(United States) No. 81 Classic BMW**	(United States) No. 9 DXDT Racing	(United States) No. 62 MINI JCW Team
7	R2	(United States) Indianapolis		**(United States) Jacob Ruud**	(United States) Kevin Boehm	(United States) Clayton Williams

== Championship standings ==
Scoring system

Championship points are awarded for the first ten positions in each race. Entries are required to complete 75% of the winning car's race distance in order to be classified and earn points. Individual drivers are required to participate for a minimum of 25 minutes in order to earn championship points in any SprintX race.

Position	1st	2nd	3rd	4th	5th	6th	7th	8th	9th	10th
Points	25	18	15	12	10	8	6	4	2	1

=== Drivers' championship ===
Pos.	Driver	Team	SON (United States)		COT (United States)		VIR† (United States)		ELK (United States)		WGL (United States)		SEB (United States)		IMS (United States)		Points
Pos.	Driver	Team	RD1	RD2	RD1	RD2	RD1	RD2	RD1	RD2	RD1	RD2	RD1	RD2	RD1	RD2	Points
TCX
1	(United States) Jacob Ruud	(United States) Classic BMW	1	1	5	1	1	1	1	2	9	1	2	2	1	1	291
2	(United States) Steve Streimer	(United States) Hard Motorsport			18	3	2	2	2	3	1	2	6	5	2	2	175
3	(Argentina) Roy Block	(United States) KMW Motorsports with TMR Engineering	23	4	24	14	14	5	24	6	5	4	5	3	7	8	159
4	(United States) Stephen Cugliari	(United States) Accelerating Performance							3	1			1	1			90
5	(United States) Olivia Askew	(United States) Classic BMW					4	6	25	4			4	6	4	3	80
6	(United States) John Hennessey	(United States) Classic BMW			17	6			4	5							49
7	(Canada) Samantha Tan	(Canada) ST Racing			13	2	5	3									48.5
8	(United States) Tommy McCarthy	(United States) Classic BMW	24	2													33
9	(United States) Garrett Adams	(United States) Classic BMW											3	4			27
10	(United States) Lucas Catania	(United States) Rigid Speed										3					15
10	(United States) Joseph Catania	(United States) Rigid Speed									6						15
11	(United States) Chris Walsh	(United States) AOA Racing					3	4									13.5
TC
1	(United States) Eric Powell	(United States) Skip Barber Racing School	2	7	2	5	8	10	7	7	2	5	DNS	9	9	9	211.5
2	(United States) Kevin Boehm	(United States) DXDT Racing	4	3	4	4	12	11	8	12	3	6	8	Ret	5	4	202
3	(United States) Austen Smith	(United States) Auto Technic Racing	8	6	6	11	6	7	5	9	Ret	9	7	7	8	5	192
4	(United States) Rob Hines	(United States) TechSport Racing	12	5	12	12	9	9	9	10	Ret	10	9	8	13	7	116.5
5	(United States) Tom Capizzi	(United States) Auto Technic Racing	5	Ret	14	10	7	8	10	11	4	Ret	10	10	11	19	107
6	(United States) Jeff Ricca	(United States) GenRacer	Ret	DNS	1	8	13	12	6	8	21	7	16	15	Ret	DNS	103
7	(United States) Mike LaMarra	(United States) LA Honda World Racing	9	Ret	3	25			11	13	Ret	13	12	13	3	Ret	72
8	(United States) Matthew Ibrahim	(United States) Garagistic with DRS					11	14	Ret	16	10	11	15	11	10	Ret	41
9	(United States) Toby Grahovec	(United States) Classic BMW	3	10	27	7											39
10	(United States) Nicholas Barbato	(United States) Genracer													6	6	30
11	(United States) Michael Sousa	(United States) GenRacer	6	8					13	17			14	14			30
12	(United States) Derek Jones	(United States) Mini JCW Team							Ret	14	Ret	8	11	26	Ret	DNS	27
13	(United States) Kris Valdez	(United States) Garagistic with DRS					17	16	22	15	Ret	24	13	12	26	11	24.5
14	(United States) Lindsay Brewer	(United States) Skip Barber Racing School	10	9	8	13	16	15	12	Ret							23.5
15	(United States) Ken Fukuda	(United States) Skip Barber Racing School									8	23			12	10	23
16	(United States) Joseph Federl	(United States) TechSport Racing	DNS	DNS	7	9	10	DNS									23
17	(United States) Kurt Washeim	(United States) GenRacer			26	27	30	Ret			7	12					16
18	(United States) Steve Streimer	(United States) Hard Motorsport	7	11													12
19	(United States) Adam Harding	(United States) Hard Motorsport	DNS	DNS	25	15	18	13									5
20	(United States) Joey Jordan	(United States) FTG Racing	11	22													3
21	(United States) Mark Pombo	(United States) Mini JCW Team			Ret	DNS	15	DNS									1
	(Puerto Rico) Victor Gonzalez Jr.	(Puerto Rico) VGMC Racing	Ret	DNS													0
	(United States) Frank Szczesniak	(United States) LA Honda World Racing	DNS	DNS	Ret	16	20	25	DNS								0
	(United States) Mike Ogren	(United States) Skip Barber Racing School											Ret	DNS			0
TCA
1	(United States) Caleb Bacon	(United States) Forbush Performance	15	15	9	17	19	20	15	25	13	14	26	Ret	19	13	184.5
2	(United States) Luke Rumberg	(United States) Forbush Performance			20	21	22	17	17	19	12	15	17	17	16	14	175
3	(United States) Carter Fartuch	(United States) Skip Barber Racing School	17	17	19	18	24	18	14	18	11	Ret	21	20	20	16	169
4	(United States) Clay Williams	(United States) Mini JCW Team	14	16	Ret	20			16	Ret	15	18			14	12	124
5	(Puerto Rico) Jose Blanco	(Puerto Rico) VGMC Racing	18	16	11	22	27	26	18	20	14	17	Ret	25	25	Ret	94
6	(United States) Mike Stillwagon	(United States) Skip Barber Racing School	20	19	15	19					16	16			22	18	66
7	(United States) Sally McNulty	(United States) Team Sally Racing	21	20	21	24	26	21	21	21	17	19	24	23	21	20	66
8	(Canada) P.J. Groenke	(United States) TechSport Racing	19	18	22	26	23	Ret	19	26	20	22	23	21	18	22	60
9	(United States) Jesse Love	(United States) TechSport Racing	13	12	16	Ret			Ret		Ret	DNS					60
10	(United States) Cristian Perocarpi	(United States) Mini JCW Team											19	18	15	15	60
11	(United States) Mario Biundo	(United States) LA Honda World Racing	22	21	23	28	28	22	20	23	18	20	22	22	23	17	56
12	(United States) Devon Anderson	(United States) TechSport Racing								22			18	16	27	21	55
13	(United States) Mark Pombo	(United States) Mini JCW Team	14	13													36
14	(United States) Derek Jones	(United States) Mini JCW Team			10	23	25	Ret									28
15	(United States) Luca Mars	(United States) Copeland Motorsports											20	19			24
16	(United States) Colin Harrison	(United States) Skip Barber Racing School					29	23	23	24	19	21	25	24	24	Ret	21.5
17	(United States) Michael Carter	(United States) TechSport Racing					21	19									16.5
18	(United States) Taylor Hagler	(United States) Bryan Herta Autosport													17	Ret	12
19	(United States) Mike LaMarra	(United States) Mini JCW Team					NC	24									2
	(United States) Sammy Smith	(United States) TechSport Racing	25	DNS													0
Pos.	Driver	Team	SON (United States)		COT (United States)		VIR† (United States)		ELK (United States)		WGL (United States)		SEB (United States)		IMS (United States)		Points

† Half points were awarded for both races at VIR after the two events completed less than 75% of the scheduled distance.

=== Teams' championship ===
Pos.	Team	Manufacturer	SON (United States)		COT (United States)		VIR† (United States)		ELK (United States)		WGL (United States)		SEB (United States)		IMS (United States)		Points
Pos.	Team	Manufacturer	RD1	RD2	RD1	RD2	RD1	RD2	RD1	RD2	RD1	RD2	RD1	RD2	RD1	RD2	Points
TCX
1	(United States) Classic BMW	(Germany) BMW	1	1	5	1	1	1	1	2	9	1	2	2	1	1	291
2	(United States) Hard Motorsport	(Germany) BMW			18	3	2	2	2	3	1	2	6	5	2	2	184
3	(United States) KMW Motorsports with TMR Engineering	(Germany) BMW	23	4	24	14	14	5	24	6	5	4	5	3	7	8	184
4	(United States) Accelerating Performance	(Germany) BMW							3	1			1	1			90
5	(Canada) ST Racing	(Germany) BMW			13	2	5	3									49.5
6	(United States) Rigid Speed	(Germany) BMW									6	3					30
7	(United States) AOA Racing	(Germany) BMW					3	4									13.5
TC
1	(United States) Auto Technic Racing	(Germany) BMW	5	6	6	10	6	7	5	9	4	9	7	7	8	5	215
2	(United States) Skip Barber Racing School	(Japan) Honda	2	7	2	5	8	10	7	7	2	5	Ret	9	9	9	214.5
3	(United States) DXDT Racing	(Japan) Honda	4	3	4	4	12	11	8	12	3	6	8	Ret	5	4	207
4	(United States) GenRacer	(South Korea) Hyundai	6	8	1	8	13	12	6	8	7	7	14	14	6	6	173
5	(United States) TechSport Racing	(Japan) Nissan	12	5	7	9	9	9	9	10	Ret	10	9	8	13	7	135.5
6	(United States) LA Honda World Racing	(Japan) Honda	9	Ret	3	16	20	25	11	13	Ret	13	12	13	3	Ret	93
7	(United States) Garagistic with DRS	(Germany) BMW					11	14	22	15	10	11	13	11	10	11	71
8	(United States) Classic BMW	(Germany) BMW	3	10	27	7											45
9	(United States) Mini JCW Team	(United Kingdom) Mini			Ret	DNS	15	DNS	Ret	14	Ret	8	11	26	Ret	DNS	39
10	(United States) Hard Motorsport	(Germany) BMW	7	11	25	15	18	13									32
11	(United States) FTG Racing	(Japan) Mazda	11	22													8
	(Puerto Rico) VGMC Racing	(Japan) Honda	Ret	DNS													0
TCA
1	(United States) Forbush Performance	(South Korea) Hyundai	15	15	9	17	19	17	15	19	12	14	17	17	16	13	263
2	(United States) Skip Barber Racing School	(Japan) Honda	17	17	15	18	24	18	14	18	11	16	21	20	20	16	206.5
3	(United States) Mini JCW Team	(United Kingdom) Mini	14	13	10	20	25	24	16	Ret	15	18	19	18	14	12	198
4	(United States) TechSport Racing	(Japan) Toyota	13	12	16	26	21	19	19	22	20	22	18	16	18	21	179.5
5	(Puerto Rico) VGMC Racing	(Japan) Honda	18	16	11	22	27	26	18	20	14	17	Ret	25	25	Ret	121
6	(United States) Team Sally Racing	(Japan) Honda	21	20	21	24	26	21	21	21	17	19	24	23	21	20	113
7	(United States) LA Honda World Racing	(Japan) Honda	22	21	23	28	28	22	20	23	18	20	22	22	23	17	98
8	(United States) Copeland Motorsports	(Japan) Mazda											20	19			24
9	(United States) Bryan Herta Autosport	(South Korea) Hyundai													17	Ret	15
Pos.	Team	Manufacturer	SON (United States)		COT (United States)		VIR† (United States)		ELK (United States)		WGL (United States)		SEB (United States)		IMS (United States)		Points

† Half points were awarded for both races at VIR after the two events completed less than 75% of the scheduled distance.
