= Eric Powell (racing driver) =

American racing driver (born 1985)

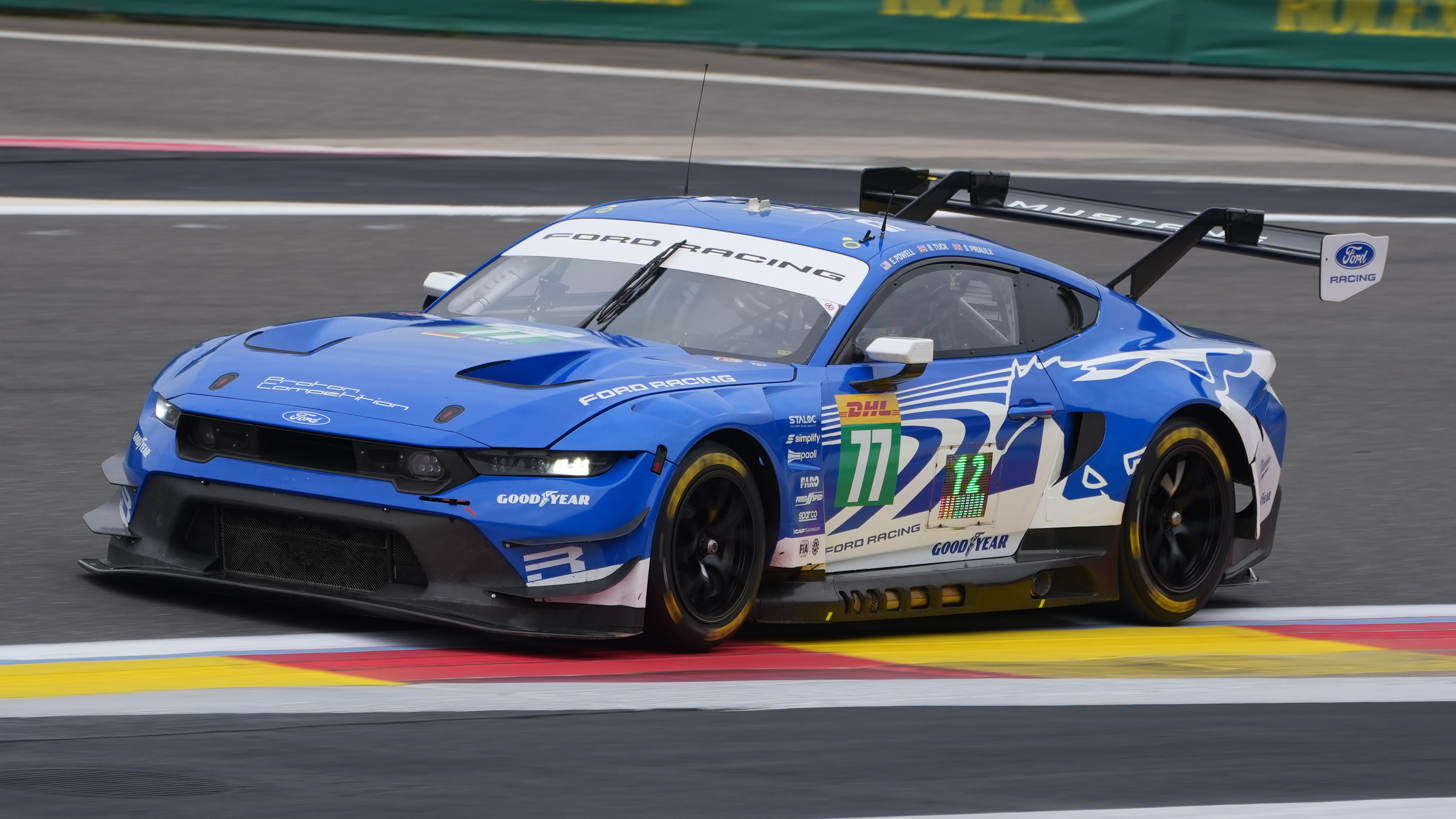
- Powell in 2026
- Nationality: (United States) American
- Born: November 4, 1985 (age 41) Orlando, Florida, U.S.

FIA World Endurance Championship career
- Debut season: 2026
- Current team: Proton Competition
- Categorisation: FIA Bronze
- Car number: 77
- Starts: 8
- Wins: 0
- Podiums: 0
- Poles: 0
- Fastest laps: 0
- Best finish: 23rd in 2026

Championship titles
- 2021 2014: TC America Series – TCA; NASA Western States Championship – Performance Touring D

Eric Powell (born November 4, 1985) is an American racing driver who last competed in the LMGT3 class of the FIA World Endurance Championship for Proton Competition.

== Career ==
Powell began karting in 1997, before moving to short ovals at the age of 14. After recovering from a serious eye injury in 2004, Powell went back to short ovals the following year, by competing in the FASCAR Sunbelt Series. Powell then won the 2006 Jim Russell Scholarship driver shootout, before joining Kensai Racing to compete in the KONI Sports Car Challenge the following year.

While working full-time as a stunt driver at Walt Disney World, Powell returned to racing in 2013 in club-level competitions around Florida, winning the NASA Western States Championship in the Performance Touring D class and getting invited to the Mazda Club Racer Shootout. In 2015, Powell made one-off appearances in the SCCA Majors Championship Nationwide and the NASA SoCal Division, as well as being a finalist for the Mazda Road to 24 Shootout at the end of the year.

The following year, Powell joined Tech Sport Racing to compete in the TCA class of the Pirelli World Challenge, taking a lone win at Laguna Seca en route to a third-place points finish. Remaining with Tech Sport for 2017, Powell took his only win of the season at the same venue, along with two other podiums, to end the year fourth in TCA. Continuing in the series for 2018, Powell took wins at Circuit of the Americas, VIR and Lime Rock as he closed out the year fourth in the TCA standings. Over the following two seasons, Powell made one-off appearances in TC America, winning both races at the non-championship St.Petersburg round in 2019, and race two at Indianapolis in 2020.

In 2021, Powell joined the Skip Barber Racing School to compete in TC America full-time, taking four wins and five other podiums to clinch the TCA title. After not racing in 2022, Powell spent two seasons in GT4 America for Nissan-fielding TechSport Racing, in which he and teammate Colin Harrison scored three Pro-Am podiums across both years. For 2025, Powell switched to TCR competition, joining Victor Gonzalez Racing Team to race in the Michelin Pilot Challenge alongside Tyler Gonzalez. Driving a Hyundai Elantra N TCR in the first six races, Powell took two podiums before switching to a Cupra León VZ TCR, as he closed out the season with wins at Indianapolis and Road Atlanta to jump to fifth in the TCR standings at season's end. In parallel, Powell also made his GT3 debut in the final four rounds of GT World Challenge America for Dollahite Racing. Sharing a Ford Mustang GT3 with Scott Dollahite, Powell took three class wins across VIR and Barber en route to a third-place points finish.

Remaining in GT3 competition for 2026, Powell joined Ford Racing customer team Proton Competition for his rookie season in the FIA World Endurance Championship, partnering Sebastian Priaulx and Ben Tuck. In his first season in the WEC, Powell took a best result of fifth at Circuit of the Americas en route to 23rd in the LMGT3 standings.

== Racing record ==
=== Racing career summary ===
Season	Series	Team	Races	Wins	Poles	F/Laps	Podiums	Points	Position
2005	FASCAR Sunbelt Series								
2007	KONI Sports Car Challenge – ST	Kensai Racing	7	0	0	0	0	115	33rd
2014	NASA Western States Championship – Performance Touring D								**1st**
2015	SCCA Majors Championship Nationwide – E Production							72	31st
2015	NASA SoCal Division – Performance Touring D		1	0	1	0	0	67	14th
2016	Pirelli World Challenge – TCA	Tech Sport Racing	12	1	1	2	6	919	**3rd**
2017	Pirelli World Challenge – TCA	Tech Sport Racing	11	1	4	3	3	150	4th
2017	SCCA Majors Championship Nationwide – E Production		2				2	59	11th
2017	SCCA National Championship Runoffs – E Production		1	0	0	0	0	—N/a	4th
2018	Pirelli World Challenge – TCA	TechSport Racing	12	3	2	2	6	201	4th
2019	TC America Series – TCA	TechSport Racing	2	2	2	2	2	0	NC†
2019	SCCA Majors Championship Nationwide – E Production		3					15	52nd
2020	TC America Series – TCA	TechSport Racing	2	1	1	1	1	31	12th
2021	TC America Series – TCA	Skip Barber Racing School	13	4	4	2	9	211.5	**1st**
2023	GT4 America Series – Pro-Am	TechSport Racing	13	0	0	0	2	58	11th
2024	GT4 America Series – Pro-Am	TechSport Racing	7	0	1	1	1	45	15th
2025	Michelin Pilot Challenge – TCR	Victor Gonzalez Racing Team	10	2	0	0	4	2540	5th
2025	GT World Challenge America – Am	Dollahite Racing	7	3	4	1	7	156	**3rd**
2026	FIA World Endurance Championship – LMGT3	Proton Competition	8	0	0	0	0	13	23rd

^{†} As Powell was a guest driver, he was ineligible to score points.

=== Complete Michelin Pilot Challenge results ===
(key) (Races in bold indicate pole position) (Races in italics indicate fastest lap)

Year	Entrant	Class	Make	1	2	3	4	5	6	7	8	9	10	11	12	Rank	Points
2007	Kensai Racing	Street Tuner	Acura RSX-S	DAY; 19			LGA; 9	LIM; 8	MOS							33rd	115
2007	Kensai Racing	Street Tuner	Chevrolet Cobalt		HMS; 32	IOW; 12				MOH; 21	WGL	BAR; 19	TRO	UTA	VIR; 14	33rd	115
2025	Victor Gonzalez Racing Team	Touring Car	Hyundai Elantra N TCR	DAY; 11	SEB; 6	LGA; 12	MOH; 8	WGL; 2	MOS; 2							5th	2540
2025	Victor Gonzalez Racing Team	Touring Car	Cupra León VZ TCR							ELK; 14	VIR; 15	**IMS**; 1	ATL; 1			5th	2540

=== Complete FIA World Endurance Championship results ===
(key) (Races in bold indicate pole position; races in italics indicate fastest lap)

Year	Entrant	Class	Chassis	Engine	1	2	3	4	5	6	7	8	Rank	Points
2026	Proton Competition	LMGT3	Ford Mustang GT3 Evo	Ford Coyote 5.4 L V8	IMO; 10	SPA; 16	LMS; Ret	SÃO; 10	COA; 5	**FUJ**; 10	CAT; NC	MNZ; 12	23rd	13

^{*} Season still in progress.

=== Complete 24 Hours of Le Mans results ===
Year	Team	Co-Drivers	Car	Class	Laps	Pos.	Class Pos.
2026	(Germany) Proton Competition	(United Kingdom) Sebastian Priaulx (United Kingdom) Ben Tuck	Ford Mustang GT3 Evo	LMGT3	244	DNF	DNF
