= 2026 FIA World Endurance Championship =

Auto racing series

- Organizer: Automobile Club de l'Ouest
- Discipline: Sports car endurance racing
- Races: 8

Champions
- Hypercar Manufacturer: (Japan) Toyota
- LMGT3 Team: (United Kingdom) TF Sport

FIA World Endurance Championship
- ← 2025 2027 →

The 2026 FIA World Endurance Championship was the fourteenth season of the FIA World Endurance Championship, a sports car racing series organised by the Fédération Internationale de l'Automobile (FIA) and the Automobile Club de l'Ouest (ACO). The series was open to Hypercars (built under Le Mans Hypercar (LMH) or Le Mans Daytona h (LMDh) regulations) and LMGT3 racing cars.

The FIA and ACO decided to stop publishing the balance of performance (BoP) tables for the WEC starting in 2026. The decision aimed to prevent speculation and misinterpretation of the performance balancing process. The BoP tables, which previously detailed the weight, power, and energy allocation for each car, would now be shared only with the teams involved.

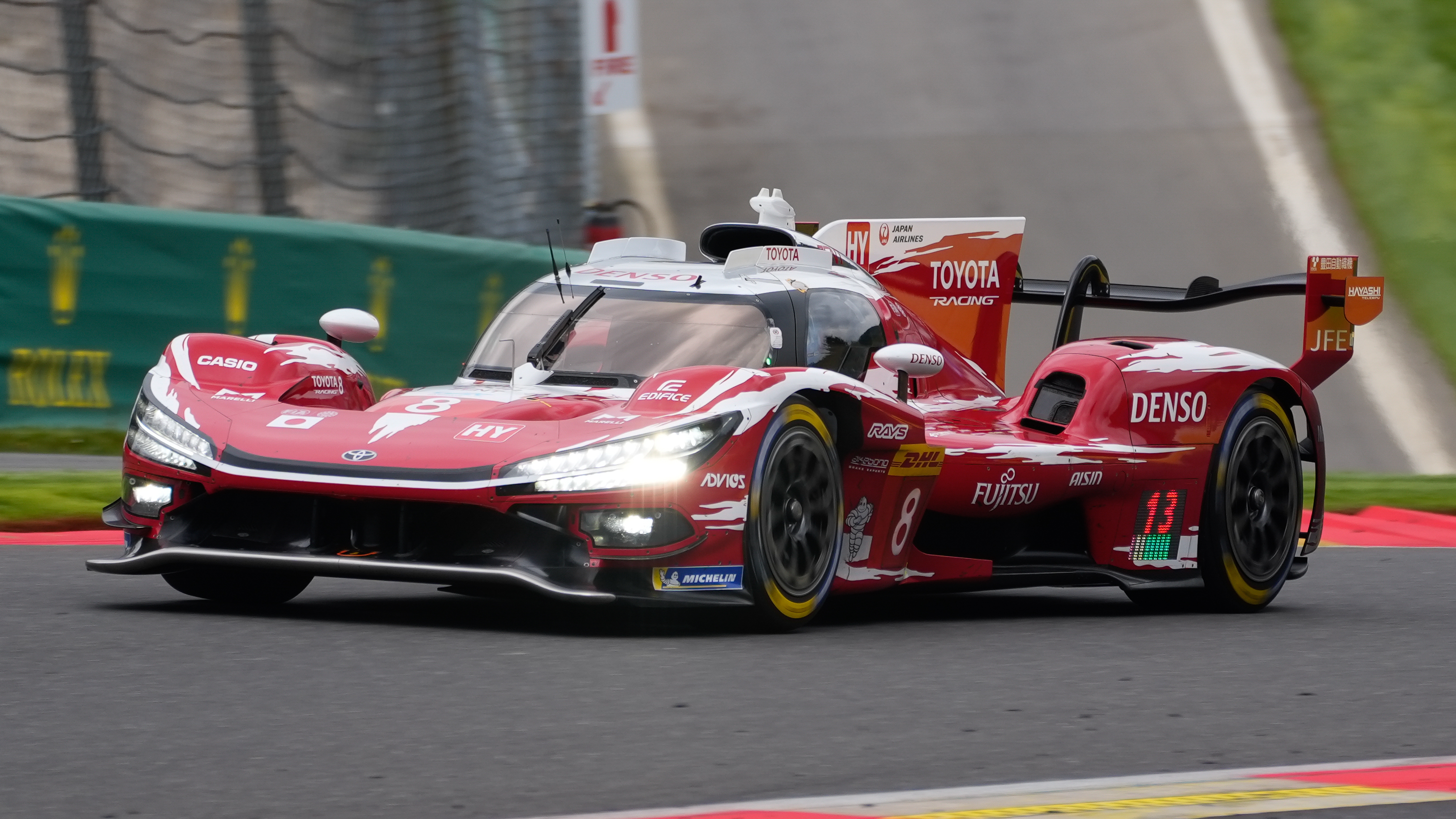
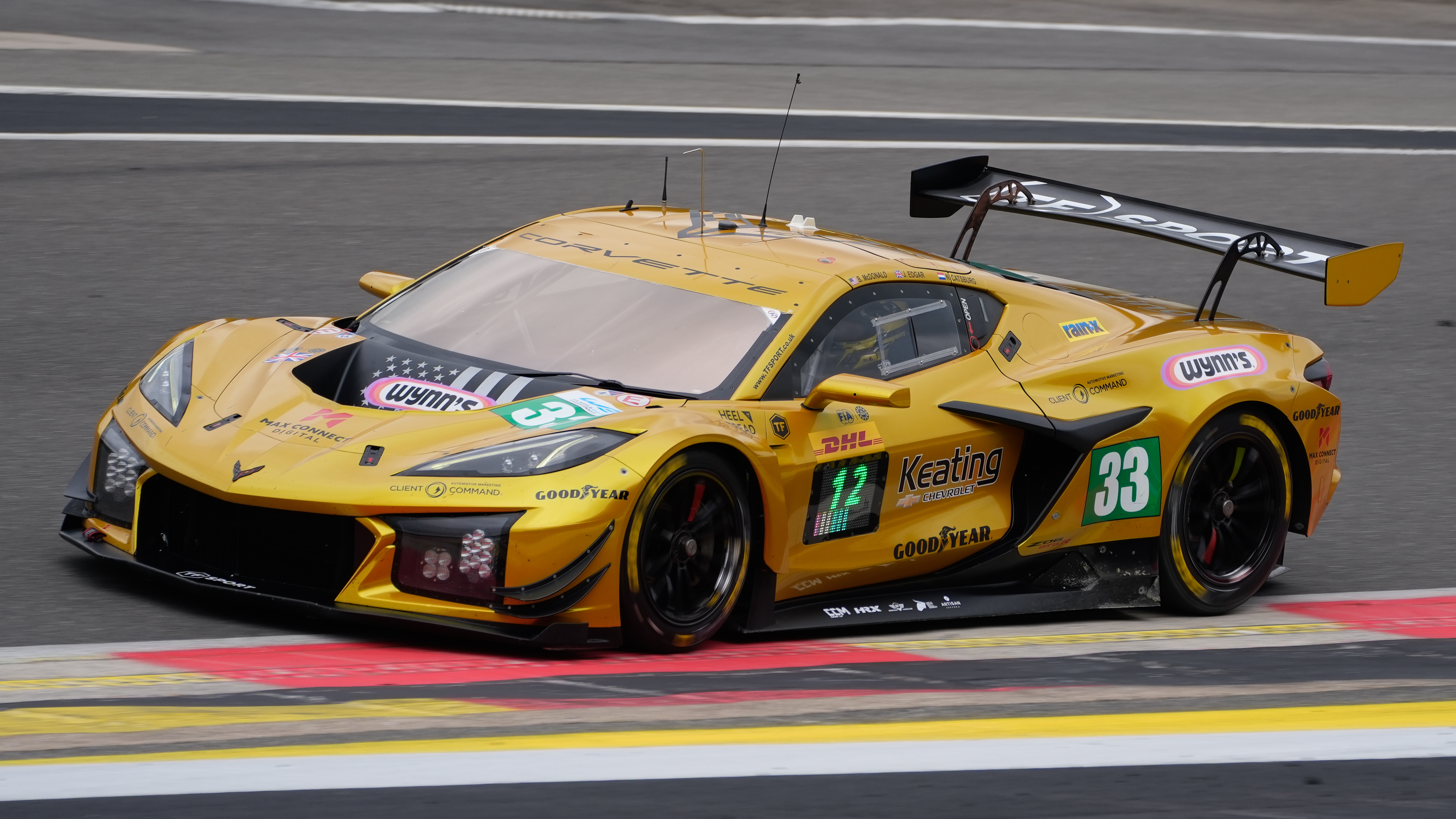
Sébastien Buemi, Brendon Hartley, and Ryo Hirakawa of the No. 8 Toyota Racing won the Hypercar World Endurance Drivers' Championship. Toyota won the Manufacturers' Championship. Jonny Edgar won the LMGT3 Drivers' Championship, with his No. 33 TF Sport Corvette winning the LMGT3 Endurance Trophy.

== Calendar ==
The calendar was announced on 13 June 2025, during the 2025 24 Hours of Le Mans weekend. The calendar was unchanged from 2025, with the only notable change that the Qatar race was planned to move from February to March. In March 2026, the Qatar 1812 km was postponed to October due to the evolving geopolitical situation in the Middle East caused by the 2026 Iran war. As a result, the 6 Hours of Imola became the opening round of the season. The Qatar 1812 km and 8 Hours of Bahrain were ultimately cancelled in July 2026. They were replaced with a pair of 6-hour races in Europe: a first trip to Barcelona, which previously hosted the Prologue in 2019–20, for the penultimate round, and a return to Monza for the first time since 2023, as the season finale.

Locations of the 2026 races

Rnd	Race	Circuit	Location	Date
	Prologue	Imola Circuit	(Italy) Imola	14 April
1	6 Hours of Imola	Imola Circuit	(Italy) Imola	19 April
2	6 Hours of Spa-Francorchamps	Circuit de Spa-Francorchamps	(Belgium) Stavelot	9 May
3	24 Hours of Le Mans	Circuit de la Sarthe	(France) Le Mans	13–14 June
4	6 Hours of São Paulo	Interlagos Circuit	(Brazil) São Paulo	12 July
5	Lone Star Le Mans	Circuit of the Americas	(United States) Austin, Texas	6 September
6	6 Hours of Fuji	Fuji Speedway	(Japan) Oyama, Shizuoka	27 September
7	6 Hours of Barcelona	Circuit de Barcelona-Catalunya	(Spain) Montmeló	18 October
8	6 Hours of Monza	Monza Circuit	(Italy) Monza	8 November
Cancelled races
Race		Circuit	Location	Date
Qatar 1812 km		Lusail International Circuit	(Qatar) Lusail	24 October (Note: The Qatar 1812 km was originally due to take place on 28 March, but was rescheduled due to the 2026 Iran war. It was later replaced by the 6 Hours of Barcelona.)
8 Hours of Bahrain		Bahrain International Circuit	(Bahrain) Sakhir	7 November

== Entries ==
=== Hypercar ===
Entrant	Car	Engine	Hybrid	Tyre	No.	Drivers	Rounds
(United States) Aston Martin THOR Team	Aston Martin Valkyrie	Aston Martin RA 6.5 L V12		M	007	(United Kingdom) Tom Gamble	All
(United States) Aston Martin THOR Team	Aston Martin Valkyrie	Aston Martin RA 6.5 L V12		M	007	(United Kingdom) Harry Tincknell	All
(United States) Aston Martin THOR Team	Aston Martin Valkyrie	Aston Martin RA 6.5 L V12		M	007	(United Kingdom) Ross Gunn	3
(United States) Aston Martin THOR Team	Aston Martin Valkyrie	Aston Martin RA 6.5 L V12		M	009	(Spain) Alex Riberas	All
(United States) Aston Martin THOR Team	Aston Martin Valkyrie	Aston Martin RA 6.5 L V12		M	009	(Denmark) Marco Sørensen	All
(United States) Aston Martin THOR Team	Aston Martin Valkyrie	Aston Martin RA 6.5 L V12		M	009	(Canada) Roman De Angelis	3
(Japan) Toyota Racing	Toyota TR010 Hybrid	Toyota H8909 3.5 L Turbo V6	Hybrid	M	7	(United Kingdom) Mike Conway	All
(Japan) Toyota Racing	Toyota TR010 Hybrid	Toyota H8909 3.5 L Turbo V6	Hybrid	M	7	(Japan) Kamui Kobayashi	All
(Japan) Toyota Racing	Toyota TR010 Hybrid	Toyota H8909 3.5 L Turbo V6	Hybrid	M	7	(Netherlands) Nyck de Vries	All
(Japan) Toyota Racing	Toyota TR010 Hybrid	Toyota H8909 3.5 L Turbo V6	Hybrid	M	8	(Switzerland) Sébastien Buemi	All
(Japan) Toyota Racing	Toyota TR010 Hybrid	Toyota H8909 3.5 L Turbo V6	Hybrid	M	8	(New Zealand) Brendon Hartley	All
(Japan) Toyota Racing	Toyota TR010 Hybrid	Toyota H8909 3.5 L Turbo V6	Hybrid	M	8	(Japan) Ryō Hirakawa	All
(United States) Cadillac Hertz Team Jota	Cadillac V-Series.R	Cadillac LMC55R 5.5 L V8	Hybrid	M	12	(France) Norman Nato	All
(United States) Cadillac Hertz Team Jota	Cadillac V-Series.R	Cadillac LMC55R 5.5 L V8	Hybrid	M	12	(United Kingdom) Will Stevens	All
(United States) Cadillac Hertz Team Jota	Cadillac V-Series.R	Cadillac LMC55R 5.5 L V8	Hybrid	M	12	(Switzerland) Louis Delétraz	2–3
(United States) Cadillac Hertz Team Jota	Cadillac V-Series.R	Cadillac LMC55R 5.5 L V8	Hybrid	M	12	(United States) Ricky Taylor	5
(United States) Cadillac Hertz Team Jota	Cadillac V-Series.R	Cadillac LMC55R 5.5 L V8	Hybrid	M	12	(United Kingdom) Alex Lynn	7–8
(United States) Cadillac Hertz Team Jota	Cadillac V-Series.R	Cadillac LMC55R 5.5 L V8	Hybrid	M	38	(New Zealand) Earl Bamber	All
(United States) Cadillac Hertz Team Jota	Cadillac V-Series.R	Cadillac LMC55R 5.5 L V8	Hybrid	M	38	(France) Sébastien Bourdais	All
(United States) Cadillac Hertz Team Jota	Cadillac V-Series.R	Cadillac LMC55R 5.5 L V8	Hybrid	M	38	(United Kingdom) Jack Aitken	2–8
(Germany) BMW M Team WRT	BMW M Hybrid V8	BMW P66/3 4.0 L Turbo V8	Hybrid	M	15	(Denmark) Kevin Magnussen	All
(Germany) BMW M Team WRT	BMW M Hybrid V8	BMW P66/3 4.0 L Turbo V8	Hybrid	M	15	(Switzerland) Raffaele Marciello	All
(Germany) BMW M Team WRT	BMW M Hybrid V8	BMW P66/3 4.0 L Turbo V8	Hybrid	M	15	(Belgium) Dries Vanthoor	2–8
(Germany) BMW M Team WRT	BMW M Hybrid V8	BMW P66/3 4.0 L Turbo V8	Hybrid	M	20	(Netherlands) Robin Frijns	All
(Germany) BMW M Team WRT	BMW M Hybrid V8	BMW P66/3 4.0 L Turbo V8	Hybrid	M	20	(Germany) René Rast	All
(Germany) BMW M Team WRT	BMW M Hybrid V8	BMW P66/3 4.0 L Turbo V8	Hybrid	M	20	(South Africa) Sheldon van der Linde	2–8
(South Korea) Genesis Magma Racing	Genesis GMR-001	Genesis G8MR 3.2 L Turbo V8	Hybrid	M	17	(Brazil) Pipo Derani	All
(South Korea) Genesis Magma Racing	Genesis GMR-001	Genesis G8MR 3.2 L Turbo V8	Hybrid	M	17	(France) Mathys Jaubert	All
(South Korea) Genesis Magma Racing	Genesis GMR-001	Genesis G8MR 3.2 L Turbo V8	Hybrid	M	17	(Germany) André Lotterer	All
(South Korea) Genesis Magma Racing	Genesis GMR-001	Genesis G8MR 3.2 L Turbo V8	Hybrid	M	19	(France) Paul-Loup Chatin	All
(South Korea) Genesis Magma Racing	Genesis GMR-001	Genesis G8MR 3.2 L Turbo V8	Hybrid	M	19	(France) Mathieu Jaminet	All
(South Korea) Genesis Magma Racing	Genesis GMR-001	Genesis G8MR 3.2 L Turbo V8	Hybrid	M	19	(Spain) Daniel Juncadella	All
(France) Alpine Endurance Team	Alpine A424	Alpine V634 3.4 L Turbo V6	Hybrid	M	35	(Austria) Ferdinand Habsburg	All
(France) Alpine Endurance Team	Alpine A424	Alpine V634 3.4 L Turbo V6	Hybrid	M	35	(France) Charles Milesi	All
(France) Alpine Endurance Team	Alpine A424	Alpine V634 3.4 L Turbo V6	Hybrid	M	35	(Portugal) António Félix da Costa	1–5
(France) Alpine Endurance Team	Alpine A424	Alpine V634 3.4 L Turbo V6	Hybrid	M	36	(France) Jules Gounon	All
(France) Alpine Endurance Team	Alpine A424	Alpine V634 3.4 L Turbo V6	Hybrid	M	36	(France) Victor Martins	All
(France) Alpine Endurance Team	Alpine A424	Alpine V634 3.4 L Turbo V6	Hybrid	M	36	(France) Frédéric Makowiecki	1–5
(Italy) Ferrari AF Corse	Ferrari 499P	Ferrari F163CG 3.0 L Turbo V6	Hybrid	M	50	(Italy) Antonio Fuoco	All
(Italy) Ferrari AF Corse	Ferrari 499P	Ferrari F163CG 3.0 L Turbo V6	Hybrid	M	50	(Spain) Miguel Molina	All
(Italy) Ferrari AF Corse	Ferrari 499P	Ferrari F163CG 3.0 L Turbo V6	Hybrid	M	50	(Denmark) Nicklas Nielsen	All
(Italy) Ferrari AF Corse	Ferrari 499P	Ferrari F163CG 3.0 L Turbo V6	Hybrid	M	51	(United Kingdom) James Calado	All
(Italy) Ferrari AF Corse	Ferrari 499P	Ferrari F163CG 3.0 L Turbo V6	Hybrid	M	51	(Italy) Antonio Giovinazzi	All
(Italy) Ferrari AF Corse	Ferrari 499P	Ferrari F163CG 3.0 L Turbo V6	Hybrid	M	51	(Italy) Alessandro Pier Guidi	All
(Italy) AF Corse	Ferrari 499P	Ferrari F163CG 3.0 L Turbo V6	Hybrid	M	83	(United Kingdom) Phil Hanson	All
(Italy) AF Corse	Ferrari 499P	Ferrari F163CG 3.0 L Turbo V6	Hybrid	M	83	(Poland) Robert Kubica	All
(Italy) AF Corse	Ferrari 499P	Ferrari F163CG 3.0 L Turbo V6	Hybrid	M	83	(China) Yifei Ye	All
(France) Peugeot TotalEnergies	Peugeot 9X8	Peugeot X6H 2.6 L Turbo V6	Hybrid	M	93	(New Zealand) Nick Cassidy	All
(France) Peugeot TotalEnergies	Peugeot 9X8	Peugeot X6H 2.6 L Turbo V6	Hybrid	M	93	(United Kingdom) Paul di Resta	All
(France) Peugeot TotalEnergies	Peugeot 9X8	Peugeot X6H 2.6 L Turbo V6	Hybrid	M	93	(Belgium) Stoffel Vandoorne	1–6
(France) Peugeot TotalEnergies	Peugeot 9X8	Peugeot X6H 2.6 L Turbo V6	Hybrid	M	93	(United Kingdom) Alex Quinn	7–8
(France) Peugeot TotalEnergies	Peugeot 9X8	Peugeot X6H 2.6 L Turbo V6	Hybrid	M	94	(France) Loïc Duval	All
(France) Peugeot TotalEnergies	Peugeot 9X8	Peugeot X6H 2.6 L Turbo V6	Hybrid	M	94	(Denmark) Malthe Jakobsen	All
(France) Peugeot TotalEnergies	Peugeot 9X8	Peugeot X6H 2.6 L Turbo V6	Hybrid	M	94	(France) Théo Pourchaire	All

Hypercar team changes
- 2024 World Endurance Drivers' Champions Porsche Penske Motorsport withdrew from Hypercar amid a shift in focus to IMSA and Formula E. Despite plans from Roger Penske, Christian Ried and FAT International's Ferdi Porsche to keep the 963 in WEC, the customer No. 99 Proton Competition car was a casualty of Porsche's exit.
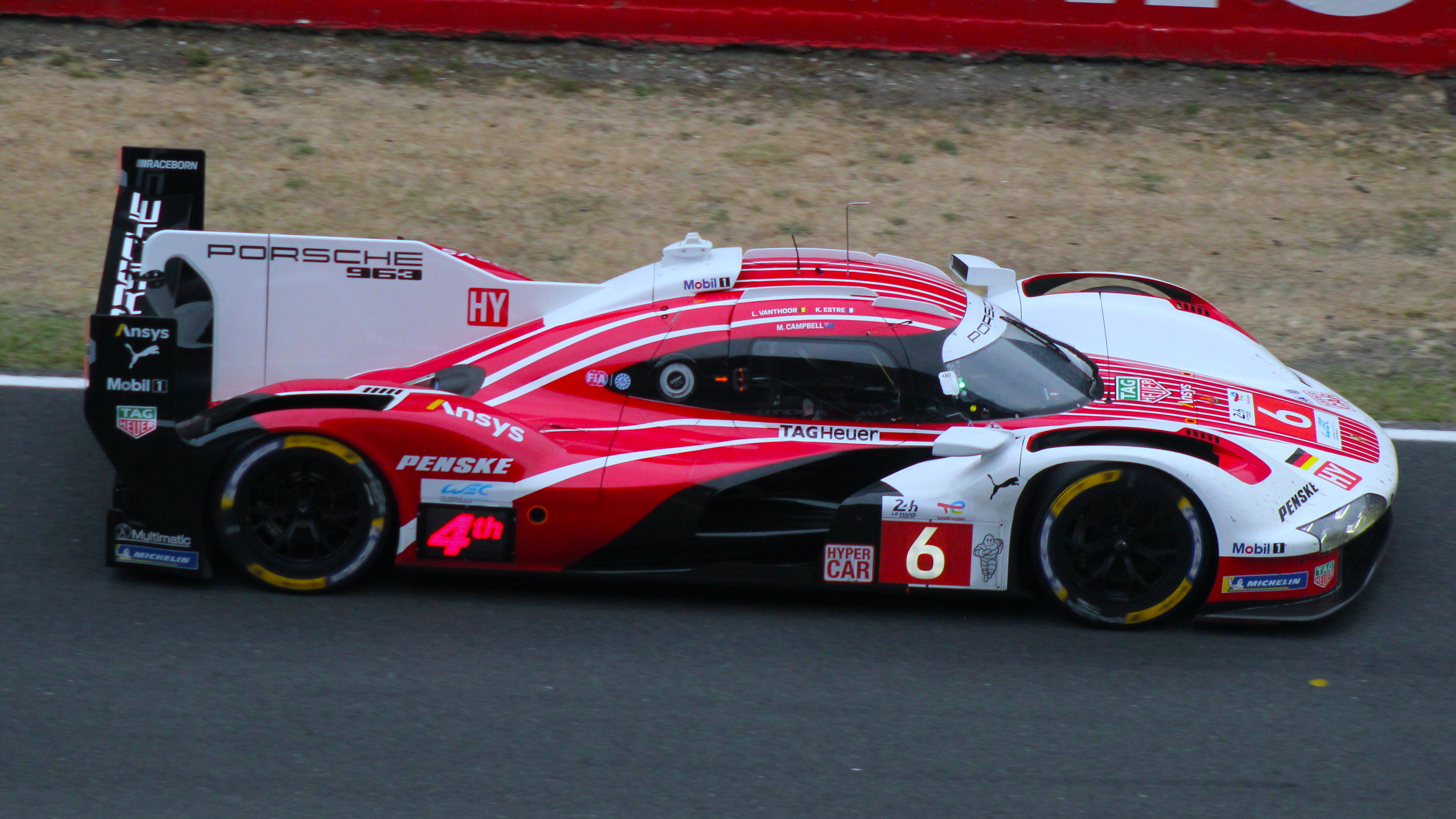
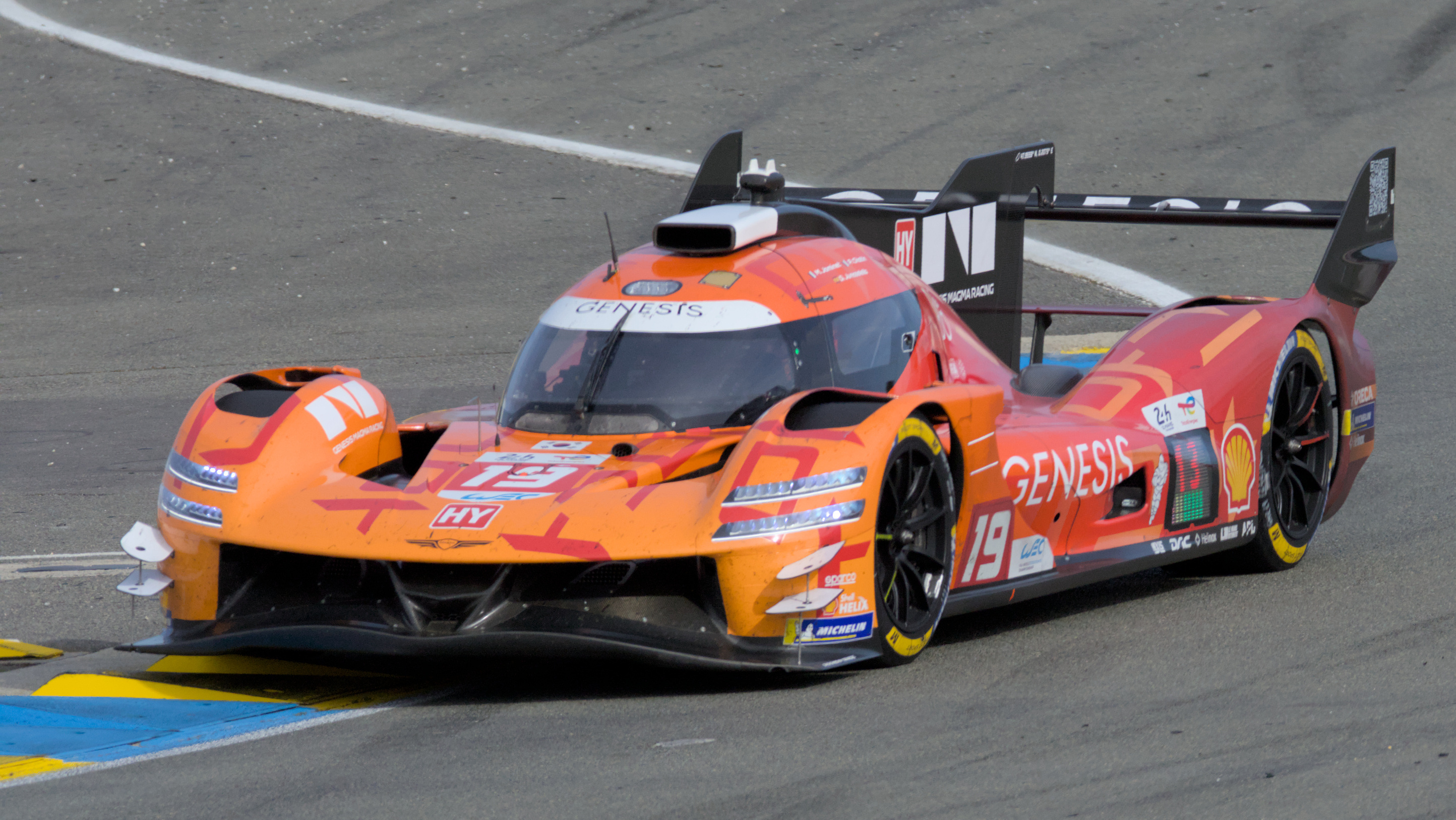
  Porsche (left) pulled the plug on its Hypercar programme, as Genesis (right) entered WEC for the first time.
- Genesis Magma Racing, the racing division of Hyundai luxury brand Genesis, made its debut with an Oreca-built LMDh.
- Toyota Gazoo Racing reverted to the Toyota Racing name, last used in 2015, and renamed its GR010 Hybrid as TR010 Hybrid as part of a bodywork update.
Hypercar driver changes
- Jenson Button retired from motorsport at the age of 45 after two seasons with Jota Sport. After initial talks with Mick Schumacher collapsed, Cadillac drafted in Jack Aitken, an IMSA runner-up with Action Express Racing, to replace Button.
- Genesis recruited three-time Le Mans winner André Lotterer and two-time IMSA champion Pipo Derani as the first two drivers for its Hypercar venture. It later secured the services of Alpine's Paul-Loup Chatin and Porsche's Mathieu Jaminet, and promoted Mathys Jaubert and former Mercedes-AMG and Corvette works driver Daniel Juncadella from its Trajectory Programme. Jamie Chadwick, also a member of the IDEC Sport LMP2 stable, was named reserve driver.
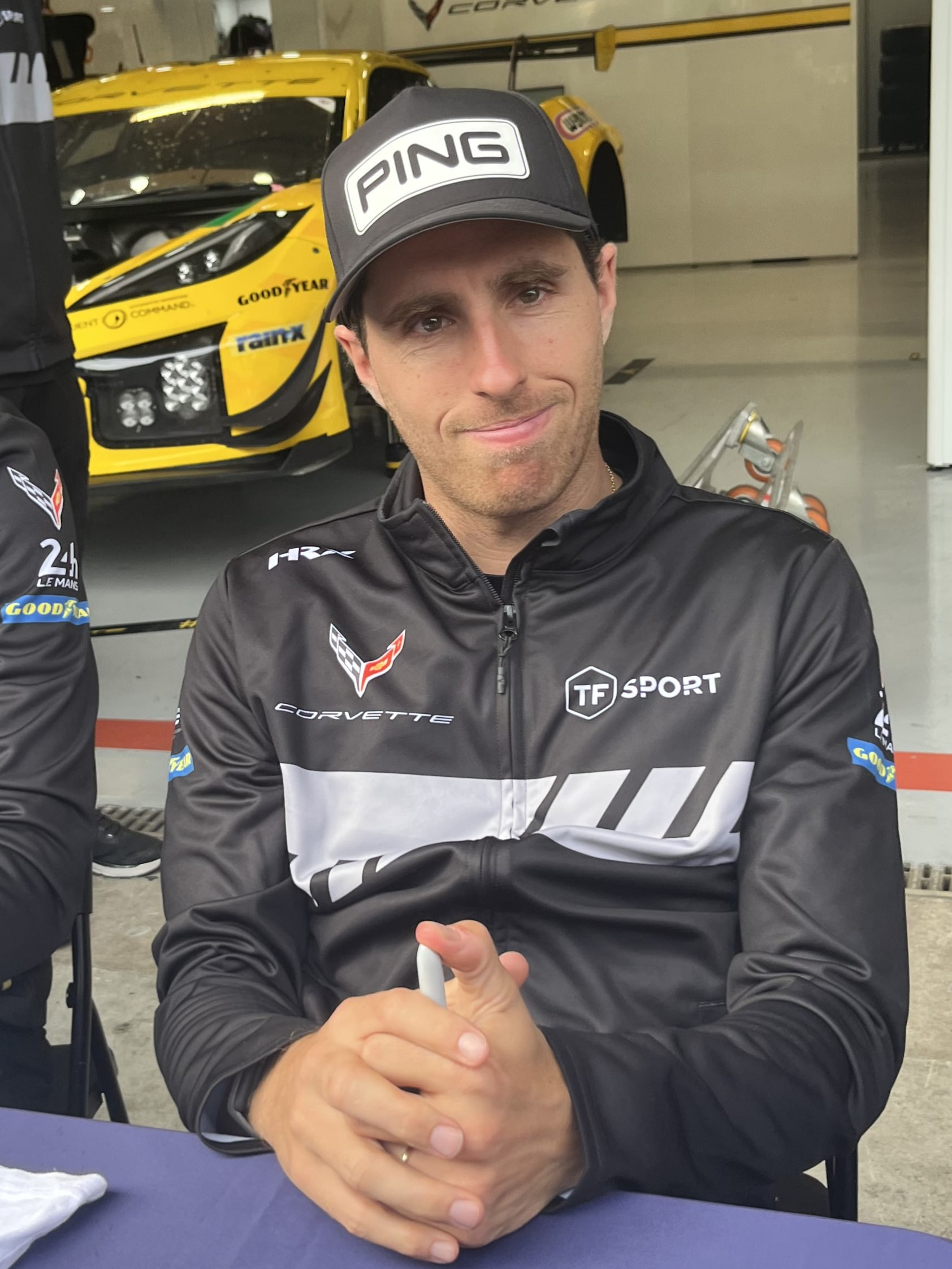
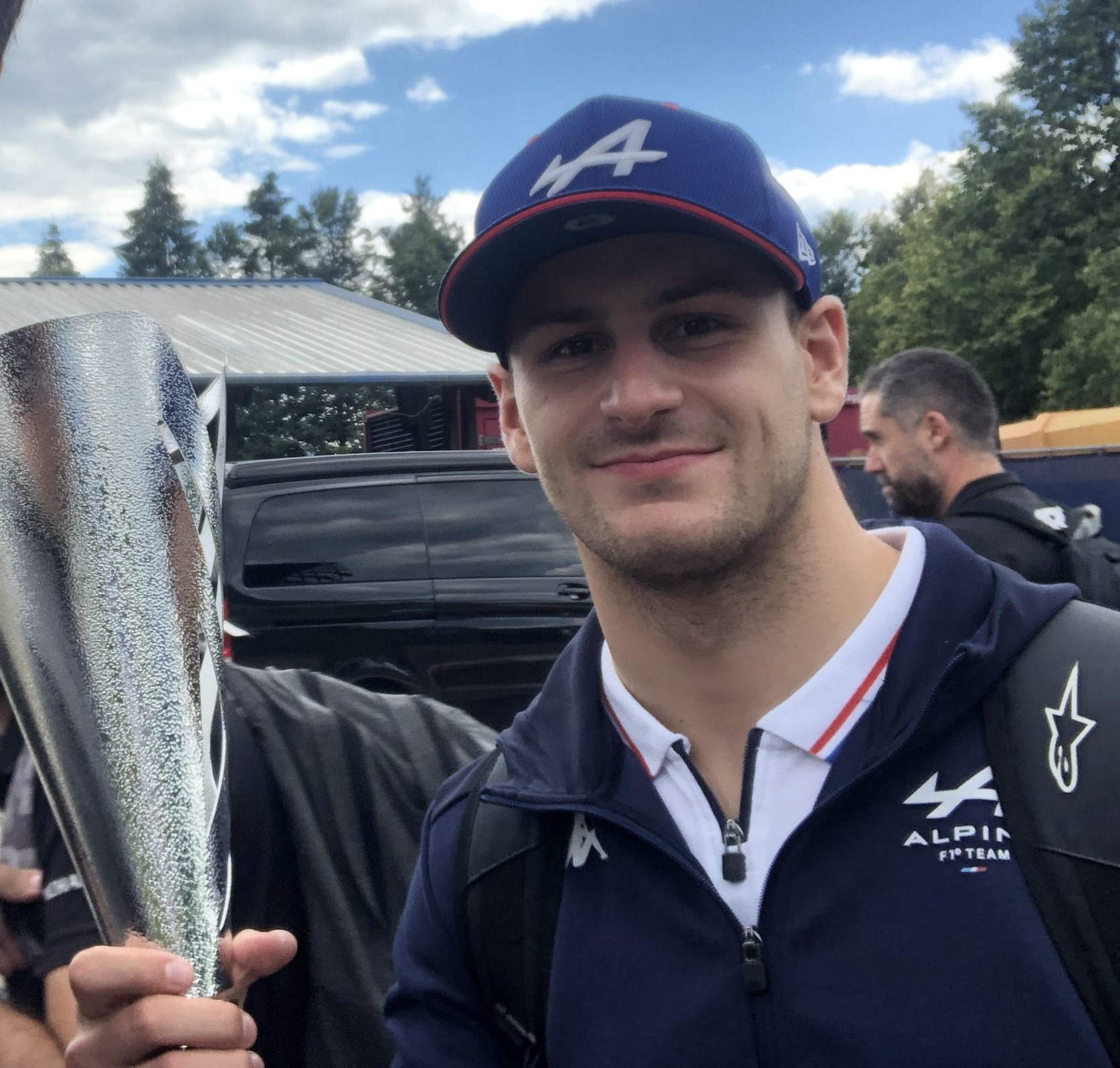
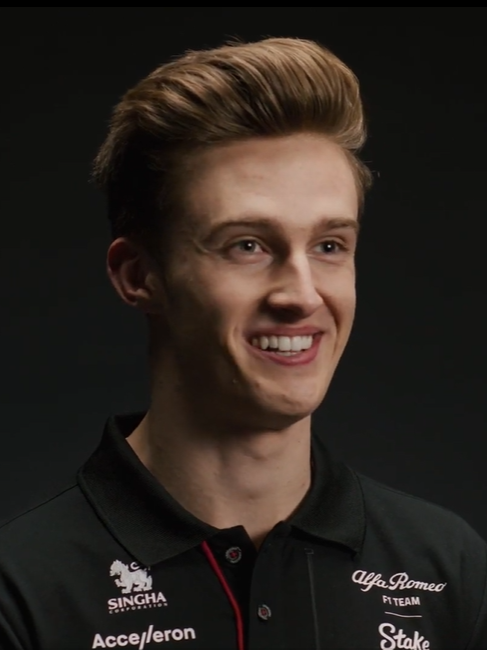
  Daniel Juncadella (left), Victor Martins (centre) and Théo Pourchaire (right) are among the Hypercar rookies for 2026.
- Alpine saw Paul-Loup Chatin leave for the new Genesis team and Mick Schumacher head off to IndyCar with Rahal Letterman Lanigan Racing. The Signatech-run outfit then signed António Félix da Costa, a returnee to WEC after two years away in Formula E, and Formula 2 driver Victor Martins.
- While AF Corse brought an unchanged three-car lineup, No. 83 privateer Phil Hanson was named a Ferrari factory driver.
- Peugeot saw Mikkel Jensen depart for McLaren's future Hypercar effort and Jean-Éric Vergne opt for a gap year. The latter paved the way for Stoffel Vandoorne, who had left ahead of an expected move to Genesis, to eventually stay at the Stellantis brand. Former Ferrari GTE Am racer Nick Cassidy joined the team in conjunction with his Citroën Formula E commitments, and Théo Pourchaire graduated to a full race seat after competing at the 2025 Bahrain finale. Vergne shared test and development duties with ELMS regular Alex Quinn and F1 Academy champion Doriane Pin.
  Mid-season changes
- Alex Lynn missed the opening six rounds of the season after undergoing surgery in his neck. Cadillac did not seek replacement for Imola, but later drafted in Louis Delétraz for Spa and the 24 Hours of Le Mans. Delays to Lynn's surgery and rehabilitation meant the No. 12 ran as a pair at Interlagos and Fuji, and welcomed Ricky Taylor at COTA. Lynn returned for the final two rounds.
- The 6 Hours of Imola also saw the absence of Jack Aitken, Dries Vanthoor and Sheldon van der Linde, all away at IMSA's clashing Long Beach race.
- Before its planned exit from Hypercar, Alpine tried out two-driver lineups, benching António Félix da Costa and Frédéric Makowiecki from Fuji onwards.
- Stoffel Vandoorne stepped down from his Peugeot duties early, with test driver Alex Quinn handed his race debut for the final two rounds and beyond.

=== LMGT3 ===
Entrant	Car	Engine	Tyre	No.	Drivers	Rounds
(United Kingdom) Garage 59	McLaren 720S GT3 Evo	McLaren M840T 4.0 L Turbo V8	G	10	(Hong Kong) Antares Au	All
(United Kingdom) Garage 59	McLaren 720S GT3 Evo	McLaren M840T 4.0 L Turbo V8	G	10	(United Kingdom) Tom Fleming	All
(United Kingdom) Garage 59	McLaren 720S GT3 Evo	McLaren M840T 4.0 L Turbo V8	G	10	(Germany) Marvin Kirchhöfer	All
(United Kingdom) Garage 59	McLaren 720S GT3 Evo	McLaren M840T 4.0 L Turbo V8	G	58	(Germany) Finn Gehrsitz	All
(United Kingdom) Garage 59	McLaren 720S GT3 Evo	McLaren M840T 4.0 L Turbo V8	G	58	(Germany) Benjamin Goethe	All
(United Kingdom) Garage 59	McLaren 720S GT3 Evo	McLaren M840T 4.0 L Turbo V8	G	58	(Sweden) Alexander West	All
(Italy) Vista AF Corse	Ferrari 296 GT3 Evo	Ferrari F163CE 3.0 L Turbo V6	G	21	(France) François Hériau	All
(Italy) Vista AF Corse	Ferrari 296 GT3 Evo	Ferrari F163CE 3.0 L Turbo V6	G	21	(United States) Simon Mann	All
(Italy) Vista AF Corse	Ferrari 296 GT3 Evo	Ferrari F163CE 3.0 L Turbo V6	G	21	(Italy) Alessio Rovera	All
(Italy) Vista AF Corse	Ferrari 296 GT3 Evo	Ferrari F163CE 3.0 L Turbo V6	G	54	(Monaco) Francesco Castellacci	All
(Italy) Vista AF Corse	Ferrari 296 GT3 Evo	Ferrari F163CE 3.0 L Turbo V6	G	54	(Switzerland) Thomas Flohr	All
(Italy) Vista AF Corse	Ferrari 296 GT3 Evo	Ferrari F163CE 3.0 L Turbo V6	G	54	(Italy) Davide Rigon	All
(United States) Heart of Racing Team	Aston Martin Vantage AMR GT3 Evo	Aston Martin M177 4.0 L Turbo V8	G	23	(United Kingdom) Jonny Adam	All
(United States) Heart of Racing Team	Aston Martin Vantage AMR GT3 Evo	Aston Martin M177 4.0 L Turbo V8	G	23	(United States) Gray Newell	All
(United States) Heart of Racing Team	Aston Martin Vantage AMR GT3 Evo	Aston Martin M177 4.0 L Turbo V8	G	23	(Belgium) Kobe Pauwels	1, 4
(United States) Heart of Racing Team	Aston Martin Vantage AMR GT3 Evo	Aston Martin M177 4.0 L Turbo V8	G	23	(Brazil) Eduardo Barrichello	2–3, 5–8
(United States) Heart of Racing Team	Aston Martin Vantage AMR GT3 Evo	Aston Martin M177 4.0 L Turbo V8	G	27	(Italy) Mattia Drudi	All
(United States) Heart of Racing Team	Aston Martin Vantage AMR GT3 Evo	Aston Martin M177 4.0 L Turbo V8	G	27	(United Kingdom) Ian James	All
(United States) Heart of Racing Team	Aston Martin Vantage AMR GT3 Evo	Aston Martin M177 4.0 L Turbo V8	G	27	(Canada) Zacharie Robichon	All
(Belgium) Team WRT	BMW M4 GT3 Evo	BMW P58 3.0 L Turbo I6	G	32	(Brazil) Augusto Farfus	All
(Belgium) Team WRT	BMW M4 GT3 Evo	BMW P58 3.0 L Turbo I6	G	32	(Indonesia) Sean Gelael	All
(Belgium) Team WRT	BMW M4 GT3 Evo	BMW P58 3.0 L Turbo I6	G	32	(United Kingdom) Darren Leung	All
(Belgium) Team WRT	BMW M4 GT3 Evo	BMW P58 3.0 L Turbo I6	G	69	(United Kingdom) Dan Harper	All
(Belgium) Team WRT	BMW M4 GT3 Evo	BMW P58 3.0 L Turbo I6	G	69	(United States) Anthony McIntosh	All
(Belgium) Team WRT	BMW M4 GT3 Evo	BMW P58 3.0 L Turbo I6	G	69	(Canada) Parker Thompson	All
(United Kingdom) TF Sport	Chevrolet Corvette Z06 GT3.R	Chevrolet LT6.R 5.5 L V8	G	33	(United Kingdom) Jonny Edgar	All
(United Kingdom) TF Sport	Chevrolet Corvette Z06 GT3.R	Chevrolet LT6.R 5.5 L V8	G	33	(Netherlands) Nicky Catsburg	1–3, 5–8
(United Kingdom) TF Sport	Chevrolet Corvette Z06 GT3.R	Chevrolet LT6.R 5.5 L V8	G	33	(United States) Blake McDonald	1–2
(United Kingdom) TF Sport	Chevrolet Corvette Z06 GT3.R	Chevrolet LT6.R 5.5 L V8	G	33	(United States) Ben Keating	3–8
(United Kingdom) TF Sport	Chevrolet Corvette Z06 GT3.R	Chevrolet LT6.R 5.5 L V8	G	33	(Argentina) Nicolás Varrone	4
Racing Team Turkey by TF	Chevrolet Corvette Z06 GT3.R	Chevrolet LT6.R 5.5 L V8	G	34	(Republic of Ireland) Peter Dempsey	All
Racing Team Turkey by TF	Chevrolet Corvette Z06 GT3.R	Chevrolet LT6.R 5.5 L V8	G	34	(Republic of Ireland) Charlie Eastwood	All
Racing Team Turkey by TF	Chevrolet Corvette Z06 GT3.R	Chevrolet LT6.R 5.5 L V8	G	34	(Turkey) Salih Yoluç	All
(Italy) Iron Lynx	Mercedes-AMG GT3 Evo	Mercedes-AMG M159 6.2 L V8	G	61	(Angola) Rui Andrade	All
(Italy) Iron Lynx	Mercedes-AMG GT3 Evo	Mercedes-AMG M159 6.2 L V8	G	61	(Australia) Martin Berry	All
(Italy) Iron Lynx	Mercedes-AMG GT3 Evo	Mercedes-AMG M159 6.2 L V8	G	61	(Belgium) Maxime Martin	All
(Italy) Iron Lynx	Mercedes-AMG GT3 Evo	Mercedes-AMG M159 6.2 L V8	G	79	(Italy) Matteo Cressoni	All
(Italy) Iron Lynx	Mercedes-AMG GT3 Evo	Mercedes-AMG M159 6.2 L V8	G	79	(Netherlands) Lin Hodenius	All
(Italy) Iron Lynx	Mercedes-AMG GT3 Evo	Mercedes-AMG M159 6.2 L V8	G	79	(Italy) Johannes Zelger	All
(Germany) Proton Competition	Ford Mustang GT3 Evo	Ford Coyote 5.4 L V8	G	77	(United States) Eric Powell	All
(Germany) Proton Competition	Ford Mustang GT3 Evo	Ford Coyote 5.4 L V8	G	77	(United Kingdom) Sebastian Priaulx	All
(Germany) Proton Competition	Ford Mustang GT3 Evo	Ford Coyote 5.4 L V8	G	77	(United Kingdom) Ben Tuck	All
(Germany) Proton Competition	Ford Mustang GT3 Evo	Ford Coyote 5.4 L V8	G	88	(Italy) Stefano Gattuso	All
(Germany) Proton Competition	Ford Mustang GT3 Evo	Ford Coyote 5.4 L V8	G	88	(Italy) Giammarco Levorato	All
(Germany) Proton Competition	Ford Mustang GT3 Evo	Ford Coyote 5.4 L V8	G	88	(United States) Logan Sargeant	All
(France) Akkodis ASP Team	Lexus RC F GT3	Lexus 2UR-GSE 5.4 L V8	G	78	(France) Hadrien David	All
(France) Akkodis ASP Team	Lexus RC F GT3	Lexus 2UR-GSE 5.4 L V8	G	78	(Belgium) Tom Van Rompuy	All
(France) Akkodis ASP Team	Lexus RC F GT3	Lexus 2UR-GSE 5.4 L V8	G	78	(France) Esteban Masson	1–2, 4–8
(France) Akkodis ASP Team	Lexus RC F GT3	Lexus 2UR-GSE 5.4 L V8	G	78	(United Kingdom) Jack Hawksworth	3
(France) Akkodis ASP Team	Lexus RC F GT3	Lexus 2UR-GSE 5.4 L V8	G	87	(Argentina) José María López	All
(France) Akkodis ASP Team	Lexus RC F GT3	Lexus 2UR-GSE 5.4 L V8	G	87	(Austria) Clemens Schmid	All
(France) Akkodis ASP Team	Lexus RC F GT3	Lexus 2UR-GSE 5.4 L V8	G	87	(Romania) Petru Umbrărescu	All
(Germany) Manthey DK Engineering	Porsche 911 GT3 R (992.2)	Porsche M97/80 4.2 L Flat-6	G	91	(Russia) Timur Boguslavskiy (Note: Boguslavskiy is Russian, but he competed as a neutral competitor at rounds 1–4 as Russian national emblems were banned by the FIA following the Russian invasion of Ukraine. The ban was lifted on 13 August 2026.)	All
(Germany) Manthey DK Engineering	Porsche 911 GT3 R (992.2)	Porsche M97/80 4.2 L Flat-6	G	91	(United Kingdom) James Cottingham	All
(Germany) Manthey DK Engineering	Porsche 911 GT3 R (992.2)	Porsche M97/80 4.2 L Flat-6	G	91	(Turkey) Ayhancan Güven	All
(Germany) The Bend Manthey	Porsche 911 GT3 R (992.2)	Porsche M97/80 4.2 L Flat-6	G	92	(Austria) Richard Lietz	All
(Germany) The Bend Manthey	Porsche 911 GT3 R (992.2)	Porsche M97/80 4.2 L Flat-6	G	92	(Italy) Riccardo Pera	All
(Germany) The Bend Manthey	Porsche 911 GT3 R (992.2)	Porsche M97/80 4.2 L Flat-6	G	92	(Australia) Yasser Shahin	All

LMGT3 team changes
- GT World Challenge Europe veterans Garage 59 took over as McLaren's LMGT3 partner, as United Autosports shifted focus to its 2027 top-class project.
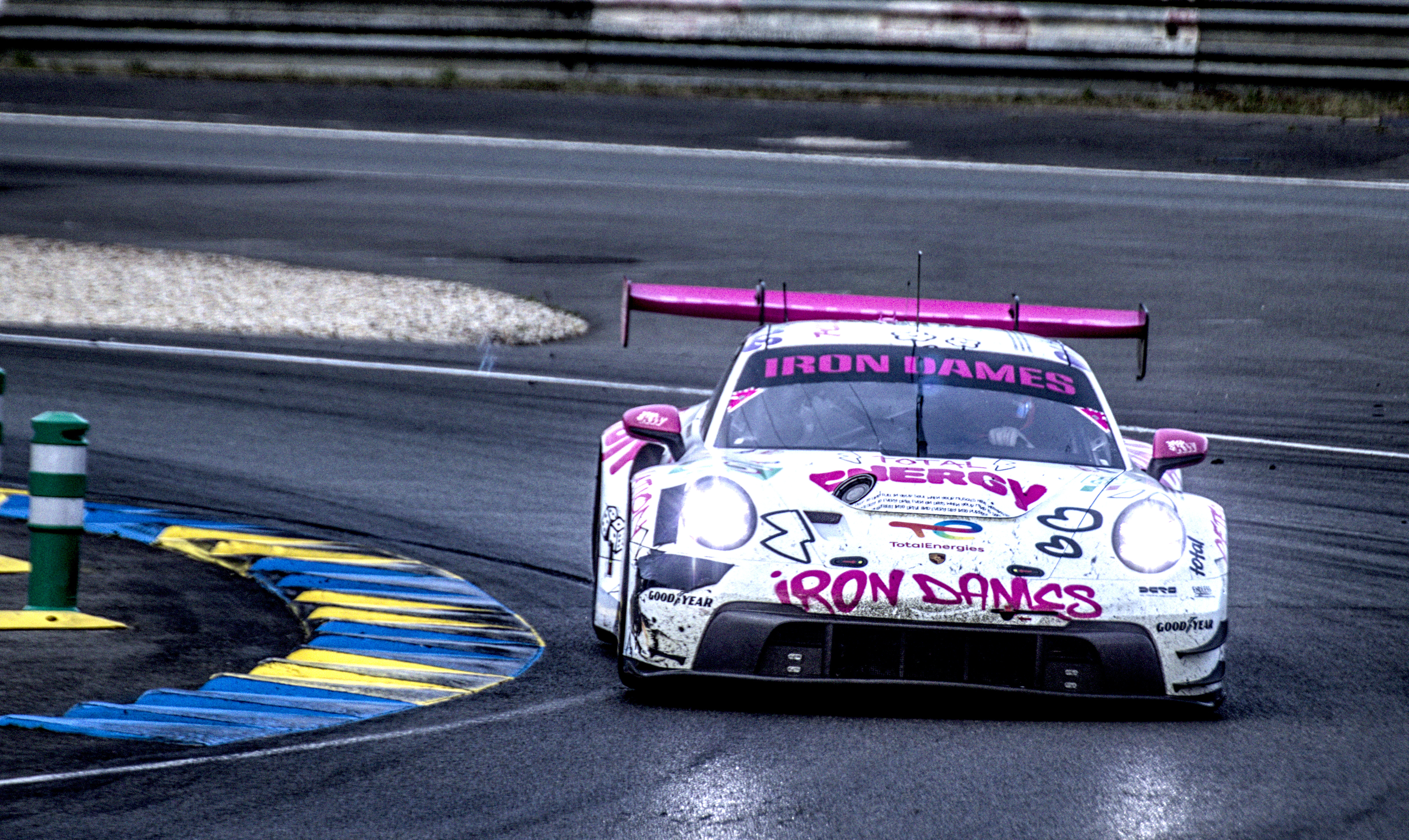
  The all-female Iron Dames crew did not return to WEC in 2026.
- The Heart of Racing expanded within the Aston Martin Prodrive fold, as Racing Spirit of Léman abandoned its one-car effort.
- Salih Yoluç brought his Racing Team Turkey squad back to the series, rebranding one of TF Sport's Corvette entries.
- Iron Dames discontinued its WEC participation after 5 years amid financial woes for parent company DC Racing Solutions. Manthey Racing subsequently took full control of Porsche's LMGT3 operations.

== Results and standings ==
=== Race results ===
The highest finishing competitor entered in the World Endurance Championship is listed below. Invitational entries may have finished ahead of WEC competitors in individual races.

Rnd.	Circuit	Hypercar winners	LMGT3 winners	Report
1	(Italy) Imola	(Japan) No. 8 Toyota Racing	(Belgium) No. 69 Team WRT	Report
1	(Italy) Imola	(Switzerland) Sébastien Buemi (New Zealand) Brendon Hartley (Japan) Ryō Hirakawa	(United Kingdom) Dan Harper (United States) Anthony McIntosh (Canada) Parker Thompson	Report
2	(Belgium) Spa	(Germany) No. 20 BMW M Team WRT	(United Kingdom) No. 10 Garage 59	Report
2	(Belgium) Spa	(Germany) René Rast (Netherlands) Robin Frijns (South Africa) Sheldon van der Linde	(Hong Kong) Antares Au (United Kingdom) Tom Fleming (Germany) Marvin Kirchhöfer	Report
3	(France) Le Mans	(Japan) No. 7 Toyota Racing	(United Kingdom) No. 33 TF Sport	Report
3	(France) Le Mans	(United Kingdom) Mike Conway (Japan) Kamui Kobayashi (Netherlands) Nyck de Vries	(Netherlands) Nicky Catsburg (United Kingdom) Jonny Edgar (United States) Ben Keating	Report
4	(Brazil) São Paulo	(Germany) No. 15 BMW M Team WRT	No. 34 Racing Team Turkey by TF	Report
4	(Brazil) São Paulo	(Denmark) Kevin Magnussen (Switzerland) Raffaele Marciello (Belgium) Dries Vanthoor	(Republic of Ireland) Peter Dempsey (Republic of Ireland) Charlie Eastwood (Turkey) Salih Yoluç	Report
5	(United States) Austin	(Italy) No. 50 Ferrari AF Corse	(United States) No. 27 Heart of Racing Team	Report
5	(United States) Austin	(Italy) Antonio Fuoco (Spain) Miguel Molina (Denmark) Nicklas Nielsen	(Italy) Mattia Drudi (United Kingdom) Ian James (Canada) Zacharie Robichon	Report
6	(Japan) Fuji	(Japan) No. 8 Toyota Racing	(Belgium) No. 32 Team WRT	Report
6	(Japan) Fuji	(Switzerland) Sébastien Buemi (New Zealand) Brendon Hartley (Japan) Ryō Hirakawa	(Brazil) Augusto Farfus (Indonesia) Sean Gelael (United Kingdom) Darren Leung	Report
7	(Spain) Barcelona	(Japan) No. 8 Toyota Racing	(Germany) No. 92 The Bend Manthey	Report
7	(Spain) Barcelona	(Switzerland) Sébastien Buemi (New Zealand) Brendon Hartley (Japan) Ryō Hirakawa	(Austria) Richard Lietz (Italy) Riccardo Pera (Australia) Yasser Shahin	Report
8	(Italy) Monza	(United States) No. 38 Cadillac Hertz Team Jota	(Germany) No. 92 The Bend Manthey	Report
8	(Italy) Monza	(United Kingdom) Jack Aitken (New Zealand) Earl Bamber (France) Sébastien Bourdais	(Austria) Richard Lietz (Italy) Riccardo Pera (Australia) Yasser Shahin	Report

=== Drivers' championships ===
An FIA World Championship is awarded to the winning drivers in the Hypercar category. An FIA Endurance Trophy is awarded to the winning drivers in the LMGT3 category.

Points systems
Duration	1st	2nd	3rd	4th	5th	6th	7th	8th	9th	10th	Pole
6 Hours	25	18	15	12	10	8	6	4	2	1	**1**
8–10 Hours	38	27	23	18	15	12	9	6	3	2	**1**
24 Hours	50	36	30	24	20	16	12	8	4	2	**1**

==== Hypercar World Endurance Drivers' Championship ====
Pos.	Driver	Team	IMO (Italy)	SPA (Belgium)	LMS (France)	SÃO (Brazil)	COA (United States)	FUJ (Japan)	CAT (Spain)	MNZ (Italy)	Points
1	(Switzerland) Sébastien Buemi	(Japan) Toyota Racing	1	10	3	17	6	1	1	10	115
1	(New Zealand) Brendon Hartley	(Japan) Toyota Racing	1	10	3	17	6	1	1	10	115
1	(Japan) Ryō Hirakawa	(Japan) Toyota Racing	1	10	3	17	6	1	1	10	115
2	(United Kingdom) Mike Conway	(Japan) Toyota Racing	3	5	1	12	Ret	8	2	11	97
2	(Japan) Kamui Kobayashi	(Japan) Toyota Racing	3	5	1	12	Ret	8	2	11	97
2	(Netherlands) Nyck de Vries	(Japan) Toyota Racing	3	5	1	12	Ret	8	2	11	97
3	(Denmark) Kevin Magnussen	(Germany) BMW M Team WRT	7	2	**Ret**	1	8	3	7	5	85
3	(Switzerland) Raffaele Marciello	(Germany) BMW M Team WRT	7	2	**Ret**	1	8	3	7	5	85
4	(New Zealand) Earl Bamber	(United States) Cadillac Hertz Team Jota	8	Ret	Ret	4	2	5	4	1	81
4	(France) Sébastien Bourdais	(United States) Cadillac Hertz Team Jota	8	Ret	Ret	4	2	5	4	1	81
5	(Netherlands) Robin Frijns	(Germany) BMW M Team WRT	5	1	2	8	12	13	14	7	81
5	(Germany) René Rast	(Germany) BMW M Team WRT	5	1	2	8	12	13	14	7	81
6	(Belgium) Dries Vanthoor	(Germany) BMW M Team WRT		2	**Ret**	1	8	3	7	5	79
7	(United Kingdom) Jack Aitken	(United States) Cadillac Hertz Team Jota		Ret	Ret	4	2	5	4	1	77
8	(United Kingdom) James Calado	(Italy) Ferrari AF Corse	**2**	Ret	5	2	**11**	10	15	3	74
8	(Italy) Antonio Giovinazzi	(Italy) Ferrari AF Corse	**2**	Ret	5	2	**11**	10	15	3	74
8	(Italy) Alessandro Pier Guidi	(Italy) Ferrari AF Corse	**2**	Ret	5	2	**11**	10	15	3	74
9	(Italy) Antonio Fuoco	(Italy) Ferrari AF Corse	6	3	Ret	7	1	Ret	3	**9**	72
9	(Spain) Miguel Molina	(Italy) Ferrari AF Corse	6	3	Ret	7	1	Ret	3	**9**	72
9	(Denmark) Nicklas Nielsen	(Italy) Ferrari AF Corse	6	3	Ret	7	1	Ret	3	**9**	72
10	(South Africa) Sheldon van der Linde	(Germany) BMW M Team WRT		1	2	8	12	13	14	7	71
11	(France) Norman Nato	(United States) Cadillac Hertz Team Jota	13	9	4	**3**	9	7	6	Ret	58
11	(United Kingdom) Will Stevens	(United States) Cadillac Hertz Team Jota	13	9	4	**3**	9	7	6	Ret	58
12	(Austria) Ferdinand Habsburg	(France) Alpine Endurance Team	4	12	6	10	3	4	10	Ret	57
12	(France) Charles Milesi	(France) Alpine Endurance Team	4	12	6	10	3	4	10	Ret	57
13	(France) Victor Martins	(France) Alpine Endurance Team	11	11	9	11	5	**2**	8	2	54
13	(France) Jules Gounon	(France) Alpine Endurance Team	11	11	9	11	5	**2**	8	2	54
14	(United Kingdom) Phil Hanson	(Italy) AF Corse	10	6	7	5	13	12	5	6	49
14	(Poland) Robert Kubica	(Italy) AF Corse	10	6	7	5	13	12	5	6	49
14	(China) Yifei Ye	(Italy) AF Corse	10	6	7	5	13	12	5	6	49
15	(Portugal) António Félix da Costa	(France) Alpine Endurance Team	4	12	6	10	3				44
16	(United Kingdom) Tom Gamble	(United States) Aston Martin THOR Team	9	4	8	6	4	14	Ret	12	42
16	(United Kingdom) Harry Tincknell	(United States) Aston Martin THOR Team	9	4	8	6	4	14	Ret	12	42
17	(Switzerland) Louis Delétraz	(United States) Cadillac Hertz Team Jota		9	4						26
18	(France) Loïc Duval	(France) Peugeot TotalEnergies	12	**Ret**	10	14	10	6	13	4	24
18	(Denmark) Malthe Jakobsen	(France) Peugeot TotalEnergies	12	**Ret**	10	14	10	6	13	4	24
18	(France) Théo Pourchaire	(France) Peugeot TotalEnergies	12	**Ret**	10	14	10	6	13	4	24
19	(France) Frédéric Makowiecki	(France) Alpine Endurance Team	11	11	9	11	5				14
20	(Brazil) Pipo Derani	(South Korea) Genesis Magma Racing	15	8	Ret	15	7	15	**16**	13	11
20	(France) Mathys Jaubert	(South Korea) Genesis Magma Racing	15	8	Ret	15	7	15	**16**	13	11
20	(Germany) André Lotterer	(South Korea) Genesis Magma Racing	15	8	Ret	15	7	15	**16**	13	11
21	(New Zealand) Nick Cassidy	(France) Peugeot TotalEnergies	16	7	11	16	16	Ret	12	8	10
21	(United Kingdom) Paul di Resta	(France) Peugeot TotalEnergies	16	7	11	16	16	Ret	12	8	10
22	(United Kingdom) Alex Lynn	(United States) Cadillac Hertz Team Jota							6	Ret	8
23	(United Kingdom) Ross Gunn	(United States) Aston Martin THOR Team			8						8
24	(Belgium) Stoffel Vandoorne	(France) Peugeot TotalEnergies	16	7	11	16	16	Ret			6
25	(Spain) Alex Riberas	(United States) Aston Martin THOR Team	14	Ret	13	9	14	9	9	14	6
25	(Denmark) Marco Sørensen	(United States) Aston Martin THOR Team	14	Ret	13	9	14	9	9	14	6
26	(United Kingdom) Alex Quinn	(France) Peugeot TotalEnergies							12	8	4
27	(United States) Ricky Taylor	(United States) Cadillac Hertz Team Jota					9				2
28	(France) Paul-Loup Chatin	(South Korea) Genesis Magma Racing	17	13	12	13	15	11	11	Ret	0
28	(France) Mathieu Jaminet	(South Korea) Genesis Magma Racing	17	13	12	13	15	11	11	Ret	0
28	(Spain) Daniel Juncadella	(South Korea) Genesis Magma Racing	17	13	12	13	15	11	11	Ret	0
29	(Canada) Roman De Angelis	(United States) Aston Martin THOR Team			13						0
Pos.	Driver	Team	IMO (Italy)	SPA (Belgium)	LMS (France)	SÃO (Brazil)	COA (United States)	FUJ (Japan)	CAT (Spain)	MNZ (Italy)	Points

Colour	Result
Gold	Winner
Silver	Second place
Bronze	Third place
Green	Points classification
Blue	Non-points classification
Blue	Non-classified finish (NC)
Purple	Retired, not classified (Ret)
Red	Did not qualify (DNQ)
Red	Did not pre-qualify (DNPQ)
Black	Disqualified (DSQ)
White	Did not start (DNS)
White	Withdrew (WD)
White	Race cancelled (C)
Blank	Did not practice (DNP)
Blank	Did not arrive (DNA)
Blank	Excluded (EX)

**Bold** - Pole position
Italics - Fastest lap

==== FIA Endurance Trophy for LMGT3 Drivers ====
Pos.	Driver	Team	IMO (Italy)	SPA (Belgium)	LMS (France)	SÃO (Brazil)	COA (United States)	FUJ (Japan)	CAT (Spain)	MNZ (Italy)	Points
1	(United Kingdom) Jonny Edgar	(United Kingdom) TF Sport	2	8	1	8	12	5	7	3	107
2	(Netherlands) Nicky Catsburg	(United Kingdom) TF Sport	2	8	1		12	5	7	3	103
3	(Austria) Richard Lietz	(Germany) The Bend Manthey	3	3	9	3	15	12	1	1	99
3	(Italy) Riccardo Pera	(Germany) The Bend Manthey	3	3	9	3	15	12	1	1	99
3	(Australia) Yasser Shahin	(Germany) The Bend Manthey	3	3	9	3	15	12	1	1	99
4	(United States) Ben Keating	(United Kingdom) TF Sport			1	8	12	5	7	3	85
5	(United Kingdom) Dan Harper	(Belgium) Team WRT	1	11	Ret	2	11	6	3	4	78
5	(United States) Anthony McIntosh	(Belgium) Team WRT	1	11	Ret	2	11	6	3	4	78
5	(Canada) Parker Thompson	(Belgium) Team WRT	1	11	Ret	2	11	6	3	4	78
6	(Republic of Ireland) Peter Dempsey	Racing Team Turkey by TF	Ret	9	6	1	14	3	4	11	70
6	(Republic of Ireland) Charlie Eastwood	Racing Team Turkey by TF	Ret	9	6	1	14	3	4	11	70
6	(Turkey) Salih Yoluç	Racing Team Turkey by TF	Ret	9	6	1	14	3	4	11	70
7	(United Kingdom) Jonny Adam	(United States) Heart of Racing Team	9	13	3	**18**	**3**	Ret	9	2	69
7	(United States) Gray Newell	(United States) Heart of Racing Team	9	13	3	**18**	**3**	Ret	9	2	69
8	(France) François Hériau	(Italy) Vista AF Corse	6	4	5	9	4	Ret	5	8	68
8	(United States) Simon Mann	(Italy) Vista AF Corse	6	4	5	9	4	Ret	5	8	68
8	(Italy) Alessio Rovera	(Italy) Vista AF Corse	6	4	5	9	4	Ret	5	8	68
9	(Brazil) Eduardo Barrichello	(United States) Heart of Racing Team		13	3		**3**	Ret	9	2	66
10	(Italy) Mattia Drudi	(United States) Heart of Racing Team	Ret	2	**Ret**	13	1	2	15	9	64
10	(United Kingdom) Ian James	(United States) Heart of Racing Team	Ret	2	**Ret**	13	1	2	15	9	64
10	(Canada) Zacharie Robichon	(United States) Heart of Racing Team	Ret	2	**Ret**	13	1	2	15	9	64
11	(Russia) Timur Boguslavskiy	(Germany) Manthey DK Engineering	4	7	Ret	4	2	7	16	5	64
11	(United Kingdom) James Cottingham	(Germany) Manthey DK Engineering	4	7	Ret	4	2	7	16	5	64
11	(Turkey) Ayhancan Güven	(Germany) Manthey DK Engineering	4	7	Ret	4	2	7	16	5	64
12	(Hong Kong) Antares Au	(United Kingdom) Garage 59	**13**	1	8	16	17	8	**2**	13	57
12	(United Kingdom) Tom Fleming	(United Kingdom) Garage 59	**13**	1	8	16	17	8	**2**	13	57
12	(Germany) Marvin Kirchhöfer	(United Kingdom) Garage 59	**13**	1	8	16	17	8	**2**	13	57
13	(Brazil) Augusto Farfus	(Belgium) Team WRT	5	14	7	12	16	1	10	Ret	48
13	(Indonesia) Sean Gelael	(Belgium) Team WRT	5	14	7	12	16	1	10	Ret	48
13	(United Kingdom) Darren Leung	(Belgium) Team WRT	5	14	7	12	16	1	10	Ret	48
14	(France) Hadrien David	(France) Akkodis ASP Team	14	**Ret**	2	14	Ret	9	14	**10**	41
14	(Belgium) Tom Van Rompuy	(France) Akkodis ASP Team	14	**Ret**	2	14	Ret	9	14	**10**	41
15	(Argentina) José María López	(France) Akkodis ASP Team	Ret	6	4	7	13	11	13	Ret	38
15	(Austria) Clemens Schmid	(France) Akkodis ASP Team	Ret	6	4	7	13	11	13	Ret	38
15	(Romania) Petru Umbrărescu	(France) Akkodis ASP Team	Ret	6	4	7	13	11	13	Ret	38
16	(United Kingdom) Jack Hawksworth	(France) Akkodis ASP Team			2						36
17	(Angola) Rui Andrade	(Italy) Iron Lynx	Ret	10	Ret	6	6	Ret	6	7	31
17	(Australia) Martin Berry	(Italy) Iron Lynx	Ret	10	Ret	6	6	Ret	6	7	31
17	(Belgium) Maxime Martin	(Italy) Iron Lynx	Ret	10	Ret	6	6	Ret	6	7	31
18	(United States) Blake McDonald	(United Kingdom) TF Sport	2	8							22
19	(Germany) Finn Gehrsitz	(United Kingdom) Garage 59	7	5	10	11	8	Ret	11	Ret	22
19	(Germany) Benjamin Goethe	(United Kingdom) Garage 59	7	5	10	11	8	Ret	11	Ret	22
19	(Sweden) Alexander West	(United Kingdom) Garage 59	7	5	10	11	8	Ret	11	Ret	22
20	(Italy) Matteo Cressoni	(Italy) Iron Lynx	12	Ret	Ret	15	7	13	8	6	18
20	(Netherlands) Lin Hodenius	(Italy) Iron Lynx	12	Ret	Ret	15	7	13	8	6	18
20	(Italy) Johannes Zelger	(Italy) Iron Lynx	12	Ret	Ret	15	7	13	8	6	18
21	(Italy) Stefano Gattuso	(Germany) Proton Competition	8	12	11	5	9	Ret	DSQ	Ret	16
21	(Italy) Giammarco Levorato	(Germany) Proton Competition	8	12	11	5	9	Ret	DSQ	Ret	16
21	(United States) Logan Sargeant	(Germany) Proton Competition	8	12	11	5	9	Ret	DSQ	Ret	16
22	(Monaco) Francesco Castellacci	(Italy) Vista AF Corse	11	15	Ret	17	10	4	12	Ret	13
22	(Switzerland) Thomas Flohr	(Italy) Vista AF Corse	11	15	Ret	17	10	4	12	Ret	13
22	(Italy) Davide Rigon	(Italy) Vista AF Corse	11	15	Ret	17	10	4	12	Ret	13
23	(United States) Eric Powell	(Germany) Proton Competition	10	16	Ret	10	5	**10**	NC	12	13
23	(United Kingdom) Sebastian Priaulx	(Germany) Proton Competition	10	16	Ret	10	5	**10**	NC	12	13
23	(United Kingdom) Ben Tuck	(Germany) Proton Competition	10	16	Ret	10	5	**10**	NC	12	13
24	(France) Esteban Masson	(France) Akkodis ASP Team	14	**Ret**		14	Ret	9	14	**10**	5
25	(Argentina) Nicolás Varrone	(United Kingdom) TF Sport				8					4
26	(Belgium) Kobe Pauwels	(United States) Heart of Racing Team	9			**18**					3
Pos.	Driver	Team	IMO (Italy)	SPA (Belgium)	LMS (France)	SÃO (Brazil)	COA (United States)	FUJ (Japan)	CAT (Spain)	MNZ (Italy)	Points

=== Manufacturers' and teams' championships ===
A world championship will be awarded for Hypercar manufacturers. An FIA Endurance Trophy will be awarded to LMGT3 teams.

==== Hypercar World Endurance Manufacturers' Championship ====
Points are awarded only to the two highest finishing competitors from each manufacturer. Privateer entries are made invisible.

Pos.	Manufacturer	IMO (Italy)	SPA (Belgium)	LMS (France)	SÃO (Brazil)	COA (United States)	FUJ (Japan)	CAT (Spain)	MNZ (Italy)	Points
1	(Japan) Toyota	1	5	1	11	6	1	1	9	215
1	(Japan) Toyota	3	9	3	16	Ret	8	2	10	215
2	(Germany) BMW	5	1	2	1	8	3	6	5	172
2	(Germany) BMW	7	2	**Ret**	7	12	12	13	6	172
3	(Italy) Ferrari	**2**	3	5	2	1	10	3	3	150
3	(Italy) Ferrari	6	Ret	Ret	6	**11**	Ret	14	**8**	150
4	(United States) Cadillac	8	8	4	**3**	2	5	4	1	143
4	(United States) Cadillac	12	Ret	Ret	4	9	7	5	Ret	143
5	(France) Alpine	4	10	6	9	3	**2**	7	2	122
5	(France) Alpine	10	11	8	10	5	4	9	Ret	122
6	(United Kingdom) Aston Martin	9	4	7	5	4	9	8	11	58
6	(United Kingdom) Aston Martin	13	Ret	12	8	13	13	Ret	13	58
7	(France) Peugeot	11	6	9	13	10	6	11	4	42
7	(France) Peugeot	15	**Ret**	10	15	15	Ret	12	7	42
8	(South Korea) Genesis	14	7	11	12	7	11	10	12	14
8	(South Korea) Genesis	16	12	Ret	14	14	14	**15**	Ret	14
Pos.	Manufacturer	IMO (Italy)	SPA (Belgium)	LMS (France)	SÃO (Brazil)	COA (United States)	FUJ (Japan)	CAT (Spain)	MNZ (Italy)	Points

==== FIA Endurance Trophy for LMGT3 Teams ====
Pos.	Car	Team	IMO (Italy)	SPA (Belgium)	LMS (France)	SÃO (Brazil)	COA (United States)	FUJ (Japan)	CAT (Spain)	MNZ (Italy)	Points
1	33	(United Kingdom) TF Sport	2	8	1	8	12	5	7	3	107
2	92	(Germany) The Bend Manthey	3	3	9	3	15	12	1	1	99
3	69	(Belgium) Team WRT	1	11	Ret	2	11	6	3	4	78
4	34	Racing Team Turkey by TF	Ret	9	6	1	14	3	4	11	70
5	23	(United States) Heart of Racing Team	9	13	3	**18**	**3**	Ret	9	2	69
6	21	(Italy) Vista AF Corse	6	4	5	9	4	Ret	5	8	68
7	27	(United States) Heart of Racing Team	Ret	2	**Ret**	13	1	2	15	9	64
8	91	(Germany) Manthey DK Engineering	4	7	Ret	4	2	7	16	5	64
9	10	(United Kingdom) Garage 59	**13**	1	8	16	17	8	**2**	13	57
10	32	(Belgium) Team WRT	5	14	7	12	16	1	10	Ret	48
11	78	(France) Akkodis ASP Team	14	**Ret**	2	14	Ret	9	14	**10**	41
12	87	(France) Akkodis ASP Team	Ret	6	4	7	13	11	13	Ret	38
13	61	(Italy) Iron Lynx	Ret	10	Ret	6	6	Ret	6	7	31
14	58	(United Kingdom) Garage 59	7	5	10	11	8	Ret	11	Ret	22
15	79	(Italy) Iron Lynx	12	Ret	Ret	15	7	13	8	6	18
16	88	(Germany) Proton Competition	8	12	11	5	9	Ret	DSQ	Ret	16
17	54	(Italy) Vista AF Corse	11	15	Ret	17	10	4	12	Ret	13
18	77	(Germany) Proton Competition	10	16	Ret	10	5	**10**	NC	12	13
Pos.	Car	Team	IMO (Italy)	SPA (Belgium)	LMS (France)	SÃO (Brazil)	COA (United States)	FUJ (Japan)	CAT (Spain)	MNZ (Italy)	Points

== See also ==
- 2026 IMSA SportsCar Championship
- 2026 European Le Mans Series
- 2026 Legends of Le Mans Series
