= 2017–18 Andros Trophy =

The 2017–18 Andros Trophy was the twenty-eighth season of the Andros Trophy, a motor racing championship for automobile ice racing and motorcycle ice racing held in France and Andorra. The season began in Val Thorens on 2 December 2017 and finished on 3 February 2018 at Super Besse. Jean-Baptiste Dubourg was the defending Elite Pro Drivers' champion.

== Teams and drivers ==
=== Elite Pro and Elite ===
Team	Car	No.	Elite Pro Drivers	Rounds	Elite Drivers	Rounds
(France) Trophée Andros	Andros Sport 01	01	(France) Nicolas Prost	6 (Day 2)	—N/a	
(France) Trophée Andros	Andros Sport 01	01	(France) Franck Lagorce	7	—N/a	
(France) DA Racing	Renault Captur	1	(France) Jean-Baptiste Dubourg	All	(France) Christophe Jouet	All
(France) DA Racing	Renault Captur	11	(France) Andréa Dubourg	1, 4	(France) Emmanuel Moinel	All
(France) DA Racing	Renault Captur	11	(France) Nicolas Prost	2, 5	(France) Emmanuel Moinel	All
(France) DA Racing	Renault Captur	11	(Norway) Andreas Bakkerud	3, 6	(France) Emmanuel Moinel	All
(France) DA Racing	Renault Captur	11	(France) "Knapick"	7	(France) Emmanuel Moinel	All
(France) Pussier Automobiles by Clairet Sport	Peugeot 3008	2	(France) Benjamin Rivière	All	(France) Sylvain Pussier	All
(France) Pussier Automobiles by Clairet Sport	Peugeot 3008	12	(France) Jimmy Clairet	1, 3, 5, 7	(France) Stéphane Ventaja	All
(France) Pussier Automobiles by Clairet Sport	Peugeot 3008	12	(France) Teddy Clairet	2, 4, 6	(France) Stéphane Ventaja	All
(France) CMR	BMW M2	3	(France) Franck Lagorce	1–6	(France) Eddy Bénézet	All
(France) CMR	BMW M2	3	(France) Matthieu Vaxivière	7	(France) Eddy Bénézet	All
(France) CMR	BMW M2	6	(France) Gérald Fontanel	All	(France) Joël Lopez	All
(France) CMR	BMW M2	10	(France) Bertrand Balas	All	(France) Philippe Marie	1, 3
(France) CMR	BMW M2	10	(France) Bertrand Balas	All	(France) Thierry Joncoux	2
(France) CMR	BMW M2	10	(France) Bertrand Balas	All	(France) Jean-Philippe Lamic	4, 6
(France) CMR	BMW M2	10	(France) Bertrand Balas	All	(France) Kévin Lopez	5 (Day 1)
(France) CMR	BMW M2	10	(France) Bertrand Balas	All	(France) Grégory Lopez	5 (Day 2)
(France) CMR	BMW M2	10	(France) Bertrand Balas	All	(France) Florent Jean	7
(Belgium) Comtoyou Racing	Audi A1 Quattro	4	(France) Benoît Tréluyer	All	(France) Lionel Daziano	All
(Belgium) Comtoyou Racing	Audi A1 Quattro	8	(France) Nathanaël Berthon	All	(France) Louis Gervoson	All
(France) Saintéloc Racing	Mazda 3	5	(France) Olivier Pernaut	All	(France) Margot Laffite	All
(France) Saintéloc Racing	Mazda 3	7	(France) Didier Thoral	All	(France) Philippe Peculier	1
(France) Saintéloc Racing	Mazda 3	7	(France) Didier Thoral	All	(France) Philippe Bansard	2–5, 7
(France) Saintéloc Racing	Mazda 3	7	(France) Didier Thoral	All	(France) Tristan Gommendy	6
(France) Saintéloc Racing	Mazda 3	9	(France) Evens Stievenart	All	(France) Jacques Wolff	All
(France) Saintéloc Racing	Mazda 3	14	(France) Tristan Gommendy	1, 4	(France) Pascal Dugrand Camp Sec	1
(France) Saintéloc Racing	Mazda 3	14	(France) Tristan Gommendy	1, 4	(Lebanon) Nabil Karam	4, 7
(France) Saintéloc Racing	Mazda 3	14	(Lebanon) Nabil Karam	5	(France) Arnaud Dugrand Camp Sec	5
(France) Saintéloc Racing	Mazda 3	14	(Lebanon) Nabil Karam	5	(France) Eric Boulade	6

Not eligible to contribute to Teams' championship

=== Électrique ===
Every driver participates in an electric Andros Trophy car.

Sponsor	No.	Drivers	Rounds
Plastic'Up	1	(France) Aurélien Panis	All
STEF	2	(France) Vincent Beltoise	All
Andros	3	(France) Matthieu Vaxivière	1–2
Andros	3	(France) Julien Fébreau	3
Andros	3	(Germany) Timo Scheider	4
Andros	3	(France) Donald Reignoux	5
Andros	3	(France) Claudio Capéo	6
Andros	3	(France) Michel Sarran	7
Enedis	4	(France) Guillaume Pley	1, 5, 7
Enedis	4	(France) Arnaud Tsamere	2–3
Enedis	4	(France) Warren Barguil	4
Enedis	4	(France) "Le Tone"	6
SPI Logistic	5	(France) Julien Andlauer	1–3, 5–7 (Note: Julien Andlauer and Dorian Boccolacci entered in the same car, but with a different car number, at Round 2. Andlauer participated in Final 1, while Boccolacci participated in Final 2.)
SPI Logistic	5	(France) Dorian Boccolacci	4
Metropole Nice Côte d'Azur	6	(France) Christophe Ferrier	All
Loxam	7	(France) Clémentine Lhoste	All
ALD Automotive	8	(France) Louis Gervoson	All
Mécénat Chirurgie Cardiaque	9	(France) Timothé Buret	All
Petit Forestier	10	(France) Louis Rousset	All
Enedis	11	(France) Claudio Capéo	7
Rebellion	12	(France) Sacha Prost	2, 5–7
SPI Logistic	15	(France) Dorian Boccolacci	2

=== AMV Cup ===
Team	Bike	No.	Riders	Rounds
(France) RMSCV Villeurbanais	Sherco	3	(France) Maxime Lacour	All
(France) J. Rolland Racing	Husqvarna	4	(France) Vivien Gonnet	All
(France) M3C	Husqvarna	6	(France) Noël Duvert	All
(France) Team EMC	Sport Moto 50	11	(France) Maxime Emery	All
(France) Moto Club Rumilly	Yamaha	12	(France) Lucas Dandeville	1–4
(France) RMSVC J6 Performance	KTM	16	(France) Johan Wang Chang	All
(France) Drevant Moto Verte	Honda	18	(France) Loïc Cartier	1–3, 5, 7
(France) Atomic Creuse Fermeture	Husqvarna	23	(France) Elie Vecchi	All
(France) TVR	Honda	34	(France) Sébastien Valla	All
(France) Trebad JLD Polygône	KTM	37	(France) Sylvain Dabert	All
(France) GEC 38	Honda	44	(France) Etienne Parseihian	All
(France) Invité AMV Cup	KTM	51	(France) Randy de Puniet	1–3, 5
(France) Invité AMV Cup	KTM	51	(France) Pierre Pallut	7
(France) Invité AMV Cup	KTM	52	(France) Kévin Maliges	1, 7
(France) Invité AMV Cup	Yamaha	52	(France) Loris Baz	2
(France) Invité AMV Cup	Sherco	52	(France) Rudy Carrère	3
(France) Invité AMV Cup	KTM	52	(France) Fabio Quartararo	4
(France) Invité AMV Cup	Husqvarna	52	(France) Sébastien Pidoux	5
(France) Invité AMV Cup	Yamaha	52	(France) Florian Pelegrin	6
(France) Invité AMV Cup	Yamaha	53	(France) Mickaël Ortega	1–2
(France) Invité AMV Cup	Honda	53	(France) Fabien Gervasoni	4
(France) Invité AMV Cup	Husqvarna	53	(France) Mathias Dolci	5
(France) Invité AMV Cup	Honda	53	(France) David Baffeleuf	7
(France) Invité AMV Cup	Honda	54	(France) Germain Vincenot	All
(France) Invité AMV Cup	Honda	55	(France) Adrien Goguet	1, 3–4
(France) Invité AMV Cup	Honda	55	(France) Sébastien Midali	2
(France) Invité AMV Cup	Husqvarna	55	(France) Mickaël Colomban	5
(France) Invité AMV Cup	Husqvarna	55	(France) Romain Taurel	6
(France) Invité AMV Cup	Honda	55	(France) Maxime Jeoffre	7
(France) Invité AMV Cup	KTM	56	(France) Kévin Guillot	2
(France) Invité AMV Cup	Yamaha	56	(France) Ludovic Borg	5
(France) Invité AMV Cup	KTM	56	(France) Grégoire Martinez	6
(France) Invité AMV Cup	Unknown	58	(France) Jérémy Miroir	7
(France) Artense Moto Club	Honda	63	(France) Romain Gioffre	1–6
(France) Moto Club des Triéves	Yamaha	69	(France) Randy Peresson	All
(France) IROD Racing Team	Suzuki	76	(France) Vivian Dabert	All

== Calendar and results ==
Rnd.		Circuit	Date	Elite Pro Winners	Elite Winners	Électrique Winners	AMV Cup Winners	
2017
1	R1	(France) Val Thorens, Savoie	2 December	(France) Benjamin Rivière	(France) Christophe Jouet	(France) Aurélien Panis	(France) Vivian Dabert	
1	R2	(France) Val Thorens, Savoie	3 December	(France) Jean-Baptiste Dubourg	(France) Eddy Bénézet	(France) Matthieu Vaxivière	(France) Germain Vincenot	
2	R1	(France) Alpe d'Huez, Isère	8 December	(France) Nathanaël Berthon	(France) Christophe Jouet	(France) Matthieu Vaxivière	(France) Sylvain Dabert	
2	R2	(France) Alpe d'Huez, Isère	9 December	(France) Franck Lagorce	(France) Christophe Jouet	(France) Aurélien Panis	(France) Maxime Emery	
3	R1	Le Pas de la Case, Andorra	15 December	(France) Jean-Baptiste Dubourg	(France) Sylvain Pussier	(France) Aurélien Panis	(France) Sylvain Dabert	
3	R2	Le Pas de la Case, Andorra	16 December	(France) Evens Stievenart	(France) Lionel Daziano	(France) Vincent Beltoise	(France) Vivian Dabert	
2018
4	R1	(France) Isola 2000, Alpes-Maritimes	12 January	(France) Jean-Baptiste Dubourg	(France) Eddy Bénézet	(France) Vincent Beltoise	(France) Germain Vincenot	
4	R2	(France) Isola 2000, Alpes-Maritimes	13 January	(France) Benoît Tréluyer	(France) Lionel Daziano	(France) Dorian Boccolacci	(France) Vivien Gonnet	
5	R1	(France) Serre Chevalier, Hautes-Alpes	20 January	(France) Jean-Baptiste Dubourg	(France) Christophe Jouet	(France) Louis Gervoson	R1	(France) Vivien Gonnet
5	R1	(France) Serre Chevalier, Hautes-Alpes	20 January	(France) Jean-Baptiste Dubourg	(France) Christophe Jouet	(France) Louis Gervoson	R2	(France) Germain Vincenot
5	R2	(France) Serre Chevalier, Hautes-Alpes	21 January	(France) Jean-Baptiste Dubourg	(France) Eddy Bénézet	(France) Louis Gervoson	R3	(France) Sylvain Dabert
5	R2	(France) Serre Chevalier, Hautes-Alpes	21 January	(France) Jean-Baptiste Dubourg	(France) Eddy Bénézet	(France) Louis Gervoson	R4	(France) Sylvain Dabert
6	R1	(France) Lans-en-Vercors, Isère	26 January	(France) Benjamin Rivière	(France) Eddy Bénézet	(France) Aurélien Panis	(France) Maxime Emery	
6	R2	(France) Lans-en-Vercors, Isère	27 January	(France) Nathanaël Berthon	(France) Louis Gervoson	(France) Vincent Beltoise	(France) Sylvain Dabert	
7		(France) Super Besse, Puy-de-Dôme	3 February	(France) Benjamin Rivière	(France) Sylvain Pussier	(France) Aurélien Panis	R1	(France) Vivien Gonnet
7		(France) Super Besse, Puy-de-Dôme	3 February	(France) Benjamin Rivière	(France) Sylvain Pussier	(France) Aurélien Panis	R2	(France) Vivien Gonnet

Notes

- The AMV Cup Final and Super Final were always run on the last day of an event with Serre Chevalier being an exception, where the first Final and Super Final were run on the first day and the second Final and Super Final were run on the last day.

== Championship standings ==
=== Points systems ===
Elite Pro/Elite

Points were awarded for both the two Qualifying sessions, Super Pole and the Super Final. Only the best result of both Qualifying sessions counted. The best time of a driver decided the classification in case of a tie break. For example if Driver A became first in Q1 and eighth in Q2 and Driver B became second in Q1 and first in Q2, but Driver A set the best time, then A would receive the most points. The sum of the points received after Qualifying and Super Pole decided the starting grid for the Super Final. There was no Super Pole in the Elite championship. Points were awarded based on the results as shown in the chart below.
At all events the field was split up into two groups. The top eight drivers after Qualifying (and Super Pole) raced in a normal Super Final and the other drivers raced in a Final. Because eight drivers raced in the Super Final, the winner of the Final was classified as ninth.

Position	**1st**	**2nd**	**3rd**	**4th**	**5th**	**6th**	**7th**	**8th**	**9th**	**10th**	**11th**	**12th**	**13th**	**14th**	FL
Qualifying	45	42	40	39	38	37	36	35	34	33	32	31	30	29	–
Super Pole	5	4	3	2	1	0	0	0	0	0	0	0	0	0	–
Super Final	15	14	12	11	10	9	8	7	6	5	4	3	2	1	1

Électrique

The Électrique championship had the same scoring system as the Elite Pro and Elite championships, but with different number of points and the Super Final was called a Final. Also in contrast to the Elite Pro championship, there was no Super Pole.

Position	**1st**	**2nd**	**3rd**	**4th**	**5th**	**6th**	**7th**	**8th**	**9th**	**10th**	**11th**	**12th**	FL
Qualifying	24	22	20	19	18	17	16	15	14	13	12	11	–
Final	12	11	10	9	8	7	6	5	4	3	2	1	1

AMV Cup

Points are awarded based on finishing positions of the Final and Super Final as shown in the chart below.

Position	**1st**	**2nd**	**3rd**	**4th**	**5th**	**6th**	**7th**	**8th**	**9th**	**10th**	**11th**	**12th**	**13th**	**14th**	**15th**	**16th+**
(Super) Final	25	20	16	13	12	11	10	9	8	7	6	5	4	3	2	1

Points dropped

In the Elite Pro, Elite and Électrique championships each driver's two lowest-scoring rounds were dropped from their total.

=== Drivers' championships ===
==== Elite Pro ====
(key) Bold – Pole position Italics – Fastest lap in (Super) Final (parentheses) – Round dropped from total

Pos.	Driver	VTH (France)						HUE (France)						PCA (Andorra)						ISO (France)						SCH (France)						LVE (France)						SBE (France)			Points
Pos.	Driver	Q	F1	SF1	Q	F2	SF2	Q	F1	SF1	Q	F2	SF2	Q	F1	SF1	Q	F2	SF2	Q	F1	SF1	Q	F2	SF2	Q	F1	SF1	Q	F2	SF2	Q	F1	SF1	Q	F2	SF2	Q	F	SF	Points
1	(France) Jean-Baptiste Dubourg	5^{3}		2	1^{1}		**1**	3^{1}		3	(12)	(11)		1^{2}		**1**	3^{1}		2	1^{2}		**1**	4^{4}		6	1^{1}		**1**	1^{3}		**1**	2^{1}		2	(6)		(5)	2^{3}		7	665 (750)
2	(France) Benjamin Rivière	1^{1}		**1**	2^{2}		2	(5^{5})		(8)	4^{2}		2	5^{3}		4	5^{5}		5	(6)		(6)	7		5	3^{2}		3	4^{4}		5	1^{2}		**1**	3^{5}		4	1^{1}		**1**	623 (717)
3	(France) Nathanaël Berthon	8		6	(9)	(**10**)		1^{3}		**1**	2^{4}		3	2^{1}		2	2^{3}		3	(8)		(7)	6		4	2^{3}		2	3^{1}		3	4^{4}		4	2^{2}		1	4^{2}		6	618 (702)
4	(France) Benoît Tréluyer	2^{4}		5	4^{5}		4	4^{2}		4	5^{3}		8	(7)		(8)	(7)		(8)	5^{4}		5	1^{1}		**1**	5^{5}		4	5^{5}		4	7		7	1^{3}		**2**	7		5	586 (675)
5	(France) Franck Lagorce	4^{5}		7	3^{3}		3	9	**9**		1^{1}		**1**	4^{4}		3	6		6	3^{3}		3	5^{5}		8	4^{4}		8	2^{2}		2	3^{3}		3	(9)	(**9**)		(5^{5})		(DNS)	582 (662)
6	(France) Evens Stievenart	3^{2}		4	6		6	2^{4}		2	7		6	6		6	1^{2}		**1**	4^{5}		4	2^{3}		2	7		6	7		7	(8)		(8)	7		7	(11)	(DNS)		566 (641)
7	(France) Olivier Pernaut	7		8	10	9		7		5	6		4	9	**9**		(11)	(10)		(10)	(10)		3^{2}		3	8		7	9	**9**		6		6	5^{4}		6	3^{4}		2	516 (594)
8	(France) Bertrand Balas	9	**9**		11	11		8		6	3^{5}		5	3^{5}		5	(10)	(DNS)		7		8	9	**9**		(11)	(11)		8		8	5^{5}		5	4^{1}		3	8		4	511 (581)
9	(France) Didier Thoral	11	13		7		7	6		7	11	10		(12)	(12)		9	**9**		9	**9**		10	10		6		5	10	10		(10)	(DNS)		10	10		6		3	464 (533)
10	(France) Gérald Fontanel	10	11		8		8	11	11		8		7	11	10		12	11		12	11		(13)	(13)		(13)	(13)		11	11		12	11		13	12		10	10		418 (484)
11	(France) Jimmy Clairet	12	10		12	12								10	11		8		7							10	10		13	13								9	**9**		269
12	(France) Teddy Clairet							12	12		9	**12**								11	12		12	11								11	10		12	11					219
13	(France) Andréa Dubourg	6		3	5^{4}		5													2^{1}		2	8		7																206
14	(France) Nicolas Prost							10	10		10	9														9	**9**		6		6				11	DNS					200
15	(Norway) Andreas Bakkerud													8		7	4^{4}		4													9	**9**		8		8				182
16	(France) Tristan Gommendy	13	12		13	13														13	13		11	12																	136
17	(Lebanon) Nabil Karam																									12	12		12	12											70
18	(France) Matthieu Vaxivière																																					12	12		35
19	(France) "Knapick"																																					13	11		35

Notes

- Positions under 'Q' indicate the classification after Qualifying, but before Super Pole. ^{1} ^{2} ^{3} ^{4} ^{5} refers to the classification of the drivers after Super Pole.

==== Elite ====
Pos.	Driver	VTH (France)						HUE (France)						PCA (Andorra)						ISO (France)						SCH (France)						LVE (France)						SBE (France)			Points
Pos.	Driver	Q	F1	SF1	Q	F2	SF2	Q	F1	SF1	Q	F2	SF2	Q	F1	SF1	Q	F2	SF2	Q	F1	SF1	Q	F2	SF2	Q	F1	SF1	Q	F2	SF2	Q	F1	SF1	Q	F2	SF2	Q	F	SF	Points
1	(France) Eddy Bénézet	2		4	1		**1**	2		2	3		2	1		**2**	(7)		(6)	1		**1**	(8)		(7)	2		2	1		**1**	1		**1**	5		5	5		4	620 (710)
2	(France) Louis Gervoson	4		2	3		3	(8)		(8)	1		**8**	(4)		(5)	4		4	2		2	2		8	3		3	2		2	3		2	1		**1**	3		2	595 (689)
3	(France) Sylvain Pussier	(6)		(8)	4		4	4		4	6		5	2		1	3		3	5		4	4		3	5		4	(7)		(7)	2		3	2		2	1		**1**	585 (675)
4	(France) Lionel Daziano	5		3	6		5	3		3	(7)		(6)	3		3	1		**1**	6		6	1		**1**	6		5	5		4	6		5	(7)		(6)	2		3	576 (669)
5	(France) Christophe Jouet	3		1	(8)		(8)	1		**1**	2		1	(9)	(**9**)		6		7	4		5	6		4	1		**1**	6		6	5		4	8		8	4		5	568 (652)
6	(France) Margot Laffite	(9)	(**9**)		2		2	(10)	(9)		5		4	5		4	5		5	3		3	3		2	4		6	3		3	7		6	4		4	6		6	558 (641)
7	(France) Jacques Wolff	8		6	5		7	5		6	4		3	6		6	2		2	7		7	5		5	7		7	(8)		(8)	8		7	6		7	(9)	(**9**)		525 (610)
8	(France) Emmanuel Moinel	1		**7**	9	**9**		6		7	9	**9**		8		8	8		8	8		8	7		6	8		8	4		5	(9)	(**9**)		9	**9**		(11)	(10)		494 (573)
9	(France) Joël Lopez	10	10		7		6	7		5	11	11		7		7	10	9		10	10		11	9		9	**10**		9	**9**		10	13		(13)	(13)		(12)	(12)		453 (521)
10	(France) Stéphane Ventaja	(11)	(13)		11	10		11	10		10	10		10	10		9	**10**		9	**9**		10	10		10	13		12	10		(11)	(12)		11	10		10	11		425 (496)
11	(France) Philippe Bansard (Note: For unknown reasons, the results achieved by Philippe Peculier in Val Thorens were credited to Philippe Bansard in the championship.)	12	11		13	11		12	12		12	12		12	11		12	12		13	12		13	12		12	11		10	11								13	13		388
12	(France) Philippe Marie	7		5	10	12								11	12		11	11																							157
13	(France) Jean-Philippe Lamic																			12	13		9	**13**								13	10		10	12					144
14	(Lebanon) Nabil Karam																			11	11		12	11														7		8	117
15	(France) Tristan Gommendy																															4		8	3		3				100
16	(France) Thierry Joncoux							9	**11**		8		7																												83
17	(France) Eric Boulade																															12	11		12	11					72
18	(France) Arnaud Dugrand Camp Sec																									13	12		13	12											68
19	(France) Pascal Dugrand Camp Sec	13	12		12	DNS																																			65
20	(France) Florent Jean																																					8		7	39
21	(France) Kévin Lopez																									11	9														39
22	(France) Grégory Lopez																												11	13											35

==== Électrique ====
Pos.	Driver	VTH (France)				HUE (France)				PCA (Andorra)				ISO (France)				SCH (France)				LVE (France)				SBE (France)		Points
Pos.	Driver	Q	F1	Q	F2	Q	F1	Q	F2	Q	F1	Q	F2	Q	F1	Q	F2	Q	F1	Q	F2	Q	F1	Q	F2	Q	F	Points
1	(France) Aurélien Panis	1	**1**	(5)	(4)	3	2	1	**1**	1	**1**	(5)	(10)	2	2	3	4	2	2	3	2	1	**1**	3	3	1	**1**	370 (419)
2	(France) Vincent Beltoise	(2)	(10)	(4)	(10)	5	5	3	4	3	2	3	1	1	**1**	2	2	6	5	5	4	2	2	1	**1**	3	3	340 (384)
3	(France) Christophe Ferrier	4	3	3	3	2	4	4	3	5	5	2	3	5	5	5	5	3	3	1	**5**	(5)	(11)	(9)	(8)	2	2	326 (365)
4	(France) Louis Gervoson	6	4	6	5	4	3	5	5	(4)	(8)	(7)	(8)	3	3	4	3	1	**1**	2	1	3	3	5	4	5	4	319 (364)
5	(France) Julien Andlauer	5	8	2	2	6	6			2	3	1	**2**					4	4	4	3	4	8	4	5	4	5	282
6	(France) Clémentine Lhoste	7	5	8	7	7	7	(10)	(7)	9	4	6	9	6	6	6	6	(9)	(9)	9	7	9	5	7	6	6	6	248 (285)
7	(France) Timothé Buret	10	7	7	6	(9)	(8)	6	11	6	6	9	6	9	8	(9)	(9)	5	10	6	11	6	6	6	7	7	7	235 (272)
8	(France) Louis Rousset	8	6	9	8	8	10	7	6	8	9	4	4	7	9	8	7	8	7	7	9	8	7	(10)	(9)	(9)	(12)	232 (264)
9	(France) Sacha Prost					11	11	8	9									7	6	8	6	7	4	2	2	8	9	155
10	(France) Matthieu Vaxivière	3	2	1	**1**	1	**1**	2	2																			139
11	(France) Guillaume Pley	9	9	10	9													10	8	11	8					10	8	88
12	(France) Dorian Boccolacci							9	10					4	4	1	**1**											82
13	(France) Arnaud Tsamere					10	9	11	8	7	10	8	7															74
14	(France) Claudio Capéo																					11	10	11	10	11	10	45
15	(Germany) Timo Scheider													8	7	7	8											42
16	(France) Julien Fébreau									10	7	10	5															40
17	(France) "Le Tone"																					10	9	8	11			34
18	(France) Warren Barguil													10	10	10	10											32
19	(France) Donald Reignoux																	11	11	10	10							30
20	(France) Michel Sarran																									12	11	13

==== AMV Cup ====
Pos.	Rider	VTH (France)		HUE (France)		PCA (Andorra)		ISO (France)		SCH (France)				LVE (France)		SBE (France)		Points
Pos.	Rider	F	SF	F	SF	F	SF	F	SF	F1	SF1	F2	SF2	F	SF	F	SF	Points
1	(France) Sylvain Dabert	6	13	**1**	**2**	1	3	3	2	3	2	**1**	**1**	**2**	**1**	6	2	299
2	(France) Vivien Gonnet	**2**	4	3	4	10	12	5	1	**1**	**3**	2	3	3	3	**1**	**1**	270
3	(France) Germain Vincenot	3	1	2	3	2	2	**1**	**6**	2	1	7	4	7	14	9	3	258
4	(France) Vivian Dabert	1	**2**	4	8	**4**	**1**	2	3	6	6	5	6	4	4	18	7	223
5	(France) Maxime Emery	5	3	6	1	17	10	8	4	7	7	4	7	1	2	3	4	211
6	(France) Noël Duvert	7	5	8	5	5	6	6	7	4	4	3	2	8	5	2	5	202
7	(France) Elie Vecchi	12	6	12	7	8	9	9	5	5	5	6	5	10	6	12	9	146
8	(France) Romain Gioffre	8	7	5	9	3	5	4	12	9	18	9	DNS	16	DNS			103
9	(France) Etienne Parseihian	11	16	16	13	9	8	11	11	11	9	10	8	9	9	11	17	94
10	(France) Maxime Lacour	19	18	14	14	11	11	10	16	10	8	14	11	6	7	10	11	87
11	(France) Randy Peresson	14	15	10	10	12	13	12	10	13	10	13	13	5	11	14	13	84
12	(France) Loïc Cartier	10	10	15	11	7	7			12	14	11	16			7	14	70
13	(France) Sébastien Valla	9	12	13	16	13	14	14	8	17	15	12	12	12	15	15	12	64
14	(France) Adrien Goguet	4	8			6	4	7	15									58
15	(France) Johan Wang Chang	17	19	18	17	16	15	15	13	16	11	15	14	14	8	16	15	40
16	(France) Randy de Puniet	16	9	9	19	14	17			8	19	WD	WD					31
17	(France) Mickaël Ortega	15	11	7	6													29
18	(France) Maxime Jeoffre															4	6	24
19	(France) Mickaël Colomban									15	13	8	9					23
20	(France) David Baffeleuf															5	8	21
21	(France) Jérémy Miroir															8	10	16
22	(France) Fabio Quartararo							13	9									12
23	(France) Sébastien Pidoux									14	17	18	10					12
24	(France) Grégoire Martinez													13	10			11
25	(France) Loris Baz			11	12													11
26	(France) Romain Taurel													11	12			11
27	(France) Ludovic Borg									19	12	17	15					9
28	(France) Kévin Maliges	13	14													17	16	9
29	(France) Florian Pelegrin													15	13			6
30	(France) Pierre Pallut															13	18	5
31	(France) Lucas Dandeville	18	17	19	15	WD	WD	WD	WD									5
32	(France) Fabien Gervasoni							16	14									4
33	(France) Mathias Dolci									18	16	16	17					4
34	(France) Rudy Carrère					15	16											3
35	(France) Sébastien Midali			17	18													2
36	(France) Kévin Guillot			20	20													2

=== Teams' championships ===
==== Elite Pro and Elite ====
Only the best two drivers in Elite Pro and the best two drivers in Elite of one team were eligible to score points.

Pos.	Team	No.	VTH (France)						HUE (France)						PCA (Andorra)						ISO (France)						SCH (France)						LVE (France)						SBE (France)			Points
Pos.	Team	No.	Q	F1	SF1	Q	F2	SF2	Q	F1	SF1	Q	F2	SF2	Q	F1	SF1	Q	F2	SF2	Q	F1	SF1	Q	F2	SF2	Q	F1	SF1	Q	F2	SF2	Q	F1	SF1	Q	F2	SF2	Q	F	SF	Points
1	(Belgium) Comtoyou Racing	4	2^{4}		5	4^{5}		4	4^{2}		4	5^{3}		8	(7)		(8)	(7)		(8)	5^{4}		5	1^{1}		**1**	5^{5}		4	5^{5}		4	7		7	1^{3}		**2**	7		5	2375 (2735)
1	(Belgium) Comtoyou Racing	4B	5		3	6		5	3		3	(7)		(6)	3		3	1		**1**	6		6	1		**1**	6		5	5		4	6		5	(7)		(6)	2		3	2375 (2735)
1	(Belgium) Comtoyou Racing	8	8		6	(9)	(**10**)		1^{3}		**1**	2^{4}		3	2^{1}		2	2^{3}		3	(8)		(7)	6		4	2^{3}		2	3^{1}		3	4^{4}		4	2^{2}		1	4^{2}		6	2375 (2735)
1	(Belgium) Comtoyou Racing	8B	4		2	3		3	(8)		(8)	1		**8**	(4)		(5)	4		4	2		2	2		8	3		3	2		2	3		2	1		**1**	3		2	2375 (2735)
2	(France) Saintéloc Racing	5	7		8	10	9		7		5	6		4	9	**9**		(11)	(10)		(10)	(10)		3^{2}		3	8		7	9	**9**		6		6	5^{4}		6	3^{4}		2	2165 (2486)
2	(France) Saintéloc Racing	5B	(9)	(**9**)		2		2	(10)	(9)		5		4	5		4	5		5	3		3	3		2	4		6	3		3	7		6	4		4	6		6	2165 (2486)
2	(France) Saintéloc Racing	9	3^{2}		4	6		6	2^{4}		2	7		6	6		6	1^{2}		**1**	4^{5}		4	2^{3}		2	7		6	7		7	(8)		(8)	7		7	(11)	(DNS)		2165 (2486)
2	(France) Saintéloc Racing	9B	8		6	5		7	5		6	4		3	6		6	2		2	7		7	5		5	7		7	(8)		(8)	8		7	6		7	(9)	(**9**)		2165 (2486)
3	(France) CMR	3B	2		4	1		**1**	2		2	3		2	1		**2**	(7)		(6)	1		**1**	(8)		(7)	2		2	1		**1**	1		**1**	5		5	5		4	2002 (2296)
3	(France) CMR	6	10	11		8		8	11	11		8		7	11	10		12	11		12	11		(13)	(13)		(13)	(13)		11	11		12	11		13	12		10	10		2002 (2296)
3	(France) CMR	6B	10	10		7		6	7		5	11	11		7		7	10	9		10	10		11	9		9	**10**		9	**9**		10	13		(13)	(13)		(12)	(12)		2002 (2296)
3	(France) CMR	10	9	**9**		11	11		8		6	3^{5}		5	3^{5}		5	(10)	(DNS)		7		8	9	**9**		(11)	(11)		8		8	5^{5}		5	4^{1}		3	8		4	2002 (2296)
4	(France) DA Racing	1	5^{3}		2	1^{1}		**1**	3^{1}		3	(12)	(11)		1^{2}		**1**	3^{1}		2	1^{2}		**1**	4^{4}		6	1^{1}		**1**	1^{3}		**1**	2^{1}		2	(6)		(5)	2^{3}		7	1933 (2181)
4	(France) DA Racing	1B	3		1	(8)		(8)	1		**1**	2		1	(9)	(**9**)		6		7	4		5	6		4	1		**1**	6		6	5		4	8		8	4		5	1933 (2181)
4	(France) DA Racing	11	6		3	5^{4}		5	10	10		10	9		8		7	4^{4}		4	2^{1}		2	8		7	9	**9**		6		6	9	**9**		8		8	13	11		1933 (2181)
4	(France) DA Racing	11B	1		**7**	9	**9**		6		7	9	**9**		8		8	8		8	8		8	7		6	8		8	4		5	(9)	(**9**)		9	**9**		(11)	(10)		1933 (2181)
5	(France) Pussier Automobiles by Clairet Sport	2	1^{1}		**1**	2^{2}		2	(5^{5})		(8)	4^{2}		2	5^{3}		4	5^{5}		5	(6)		(6)	7		5	3^{2}		3	4^{4}		5	1^{2}		**1**	3^{5}		4	1^{1}		**1**	1902 (2157)
5	(France) Pussier Automobiles by Clairet Sport	2B	(6)		(8)	4		4	4		4	6		5	2		1	3		3	5		4	4		3	5		4	(7)		(7)	2		3	2		2	1		**1**	1902 (2157)
5	(France) Pussier Automobiles by Clairet Sport	12	12	10		12	12		12	12		9	**12**		10	11		8		7	11	12		12	11		10	10		13	13		11	10		12	11		9	**9**		1902 (2157)
5	(France) Pussier Automobiles by Clairet Sport	12B	(11)	(13)		11	10		11	10		10	10		10	10		9	**10**		9	**9**		10	10		10	13		12	10		(11)	(12)		11	10		10	11		1902 (2157)
6	(France) Trophée Andros (Note: The points scored at other teams by Franck Lagorce and Nicolas Prost counted towards the points of the Trophée Andros team.)	01																																		11	DNS		5^{5}		DNS	782

Notes

- The car numbers without B behind them indicate Elite Pro entries and with B behind them indicate Elite entries.

==== Électrique ====
Pos.	Sponsor	No.	VTH (France)				HUE (France)				PCA (Andorra)				ISO (France)				SCH (France)				LVE (France)				SBE (France)		Points
Pos.	Sponsor	No.	Q	F1	Q	F2	Q	F1	Q	F2	Q	F1	Q	F2	Q	F1	Q	F2	Q	F1	Q	F2	Q	F1	Q	F2	Q	F	Points
1	Plastic'Up	1	1	**1**	5	4	3	2	1	**1**	1	**1**	5	10	2	2	3	4	2	2	3	2	1	**1**	3	3	1	**1**	419
2	STEF	2	2	10	4	10	5	5	3	4	3	2	3	1	1	**1**	2	2	6	5	5	4	2	2	1	**1**	3	3	384
3	SPI Logistic	5	5	8	2	2	6	6			2	3	1	**2**	4	4	1	**1**	4	4	4	3	4	8	4	5	4	5	372
3	SPI Logistic	15							9	10																			372
4	Metropole Nice Côte d'Azur	6	4	3	3	3	2	4	4	3	5	5	2	3	5	5	5	5	3	3	1	**5**	5	11	9	8	2	2	365
5	ALD Automotive	8	6	4	6	5	4	3	5	5	4	8	7	8	3	3	4	3	1	**1**	2	1	3	3	5	4	5	4	364
6	Andros	3	3	2	1	**1**	1	**1**	2	2	10	7	10	5	8	7	7	8	11	11	10	10	11	10	11	10	12	11	294
7	Loxam	7	7	5	8	7	7	7	10	7	9	4	6	9	6	6	6	6	9	9	9	7	9	5	7	6	6	6	285
8	Mécénat Chirurgie Cardiaque	9	10	7	7	6	9	8	6	11	6	6	9	6	9	8	9	9	5	10	6	11	6	6	6	7	7	7	272
9	Petit Forestier	10	8	6	9	8	8	10	7	6	8	9	4	4	7	9	8	7	8	7	7	9	8	7	10	9	9	12	264
10	Enedis	4	9	9	10	9	10	9	11	8	7	10	8	7	10	10	10	10	10	8	11	8	10	9	8	11	10	8	243
10	Enedis	11																									11	10	243
11	Rebellion	12					11	11	8	9									7	6	8	6	7	4	2	2	8	9	155
