= 2016–17 Andros Trophy =

The 2016–17 Andros Trophy is the 27th season of the Andros Trophy, a motor racing championship for automobile ice racing and motorcycle ice racing held in France and Andorra. The season began in Val Thorens on 3 December 2016 and finished on 28 January 2017 at Super Besse.

Jean-Baptiste Dubourg is the defending Elite Pro drivers' champion.

== Teams and drivers ==
=== Elite Pro and Elite ===
Team	Car	No.	Elite Pro Drivers	Rounds	Elite Drivers	Rounds
(France) DA Racing	Renault Clio	1	(France) Jean-Baptiste Dubourg	All	(France) Christophe Jouet	1
(France) DA Racing	Renault Clio	7	(France) Andréa Dubourg	1, 6	(France) Emmanuel Moinel	All
(France) DA Racing	Renault Clio	7	(France) Romain Grosjean	3	(France) Emmanuel Moinel	All
(France) DA Racing	Renault Clio	7	(France) Christophe Jouet	7	(France) Emmanuel Moinel	All
Mazda France	Mazda 3	2	(France) Franck Lagorce	All	(France) Didier Thoral	1–3
Mazda France	Mazda 3	2	(France) Franck Lagorce	All	(France) Jacques Wolff	4–7
Mazda France	Mazda 3	4	(France) Adrien Tambay	1–3	(France) Jacques Wolff	1–3
Mazda France	Mazda 3	4	(France) Nicolas Jamin	4	(France) Didier Thoral	4–7
Mazda France	Mazda 3	4	(France) Lionel Daziano	5–7	(France) Didier Thoral	4–7
(France) Rhônes Alpes Sport 38	Mini Countryman	3	(France) Benjamin Rivière	All	(France) Dominique Chianale	1
(France) Rhônes Alpes Sport 38	Mini Countryman	3	(France) Benjamin Rivière	All	(Lebanon) Nabil Karam	4
(France) Rhônes Alpes Sport 38	Mini Countryman	3	(France) Benjamin Rivière	All	(France) Romain Delage	5
(France) Rhônes Alpes Sport 38	Mini Countryman	3	(France) Benjamin Rivière	All	(France) Firmin Cadeddu	6–7
(Belgium) Belgian Audi Club Team WRT	Audi A1 Quattro	5	(France) Olivier Panis	All	(France) Bérénice Demoustier	All
(Belgium) Belgian Audi Club Team WRT	Audi A1 Quattro	10	(France) Benoît Tréluyer	All	(France) Nathanaël Berthon	All
(France) CMR	BMW M2	6	(France) Jean-Philippe Dayraut	All	(France) Eddy Bénézet	All
(France) CMR	BMW M2	9	(France) Gérald Fontanel	All	(France) Joël Lopez	All
(France) CMR	BMW M2	11	(France) Christian Beroujon	1	(France) Christian Beroujon	2–7
(France) CMR	BMW M2	11	(France) Gilles Stievenart	2–5, 7	(France) Christian Beroujon	2–7
(France) CMR	BMW M2	11	(France) Evens Stievenart	6	(France) Christian Beroujon	2–7
(France) Saintéloc Racing	Mazda 3	8	(France) Olivier Pernaut	All	(France) Margot Laffite	All
(France) Saintéloc Racing	Mazda 3	14	(France) Didier Thoral	5	(France) Arnaud Dugrand Camp Sec	5
(France) Saintéloc Racing	Mazda 3	14	(France) Thierry Joncoux	6–7	(France) Pascal Dugrand Camp Sec	6
(France) Saintéloc Racing	Mazda 3	14	(France) Thierry Joncoux	6–7	(Lebanon) Nabil Karam	7
(France) PUSSIER Auto / Réseau PEUGEOT	Peugeot 3008	12	(France) Bertrand Balas	All	(France) Sylvain Pussier	All

Not eligible for Teams' Championship

=== Électrique ===
Every driver participates in an electric Andros Trophy car.

Sponsor	No.	Drivers	Rounds
Plastic'Up	1	(France) Aurélien Panis	All
STEF	2	(France) Vincent Beltoise	All
Andros	3	(France) Louis Rousset	1–2
Andros	3	(France) Renaud Lavillenie	3
Andros	3	(France) Julien Fébreau	4
Andros	3	(France) Florent Manaudou	5
Andros	3	(Monaco) Stéphane Ortelli	6
Andros	3	(France) Fabien Gilot	7
Enedis	4	(France) Guillaume Pley	1, 7
Enedis	4	(France) Arnaud Tsamere	2, 4
Enedis	4	(France) Julien Absalon	3
Enedis	4	(France) Camille Lacourt	5
Enedis	4	(France) Bruce Jouanny	6
SPI Logistic	5	(France) Julien Andlauer	All
Metropole Nice Côte d'Azur	6	(France) Christophe Ferrier	All
Loxam	7	(France) Clémentine Lhoste	All
ALD Automotive	8	(France) Louis Gervoson	All
mesampoulesgratuites.fr	9	(France) Nyls Stievenart	All
Loxam/HiperPas	10	(France) Matthieu Vaxivière	2
Enedis	10	(France) Gonzague Dambricourt	7
#TropheeAndros	11	(France) Camille Lacourt	1
#TropheeAndros	11	(France) Matthieu Vaxivière	7
Rebellion	12	(France) Nicolas Prost	1–3, 7

=== AMV Cup ===
Team	Bike	No.	Riders	Rounds
(France) MC Chanos Curson	Kawasaki	2	(France) Noël Duvert	All
(France) J. Rolland Racing	Yamaha	4	(France) Vivien Gonnet	1–4
(France) J. Rolland Racing	Husqvarna	4	(France) Vivien Gonnet	5–7
(France) MC des Bruyéres	Yamaha	11	(France) Maxime Thinon	1–6
(France) Supermotard Racing 73	Honda	12	(France) Cyprien Poncet	All
(France) BHM Racing	Honda	18	(France) Loïc Cartier	All
(France) Atomic Moto	Husqvarna	23	(France) Elie Vecchi	All
(France) MC 1.Pulsion	KTM	34	(France) Sébastien Valla	All
(France) Invité AMV Cup	Yamaha	36	(France) Adrien Goguet	4
(France) Invité AMV Cup	Honda	50	(France) Germain Vincenot	1–2
(France) Invité AMV Cup	Yamaha	50	(France) Mickaël Ortega	3
(France) Invité AMV Cup	Yamaha	50	(France) Matthieu Cayrol	5
(France) Invité AMV Cup	Honda	50	(France) Kévin Duvert	6
(France) Invité AMV Cup	Honda	50	(France) Maxime Jeoffre	7
(France) Invité AMV Cup	Sherco	51	(France) Mickaël Falquet	1
(France) Invité AMV Cup	Beta	51	(Andorra) Alex Antor	2
(France) Invité AMV Cup	Sherco	51	(France) Guillaume Spaeth	3
(France) Invité AMV Cup	Husqvarna	51	(France) Mickaël Amodeo	4–5
(France) Invité AMV Cup	KTM	51	(France) Jérome Bas	6
(France) Invité AMV Cup	Husqvarna	51	(France) Johan Wang Chang	7
(France) Invité AMV Cup	Yamaha	52	(France) Sébastien Midali	1
(France) Invité AMV Cup	Honda	52	(Andorra) Xavi España Muñoz	2
(France) Invité AMV Cup	KTM	52	(France) Florian Teyssier	3
(France) Invité AMV Cup	Husqvarna	52	(France) Julien Colomban	5
(France) Invité AMV Cup	Suzuki	52	(France) Vincent Philippe	6
(France) Invité AMV Cup	Kawasaki	52	(France) Maxime Emery	7
(France) Invité AMV Cup	Honda	53	(France) Ludovic Lucquin	1
(France) Invité AMV Cup	KTM	53	(Andorra) Daniel Fontanet	2
(France) Invité AMV Cup	KTM	53	(France) Kévin Guillot	3
(France) Invité AMV Cup	Sherco	53	(France) Julien Chavlard	5
(France) Invité AMV Cup	Honda	53	(France) Fabien Gervasoni	6
(France) Invité AMV Cup	KTM	53	(France) Benoît Tréluyer	7
(France) Invité AMV Cup	Suzuki	54	(France) Thomas Ramette	3
(France) Invité AMV Cup	KTM	54	(France) Randy de Puniet	4–7
(France) Invité AMV Cup	KTM	55	(France) Cédric Chalvin	5
(France) Invité AMV Cup	Yamaha	55	(France) Adrian Parassol	7
(France) Trebad JLD Ogas	KTM	37	(France) Sylvain Dabert	All
(France) Trebad JLD Ogas	KTM	76	(France) Vivian Dabert	All
(France) GEC 38	Beta	44	(France) Etienne Parseihian	All
Team Beta France	Beta	63	(France) Romain Gioffre	All
(France) MC des Trièves	Yamaha	69	(France) Randy Peresson	All

== Calendar and results ==
Rnd.		Circuit	Date	Elite Pro Winners	Elite Winners	Électrique Winners	AMV Cup Winners	
2016
1	R1	(France) Val Thorens, Savoie	3 December	(France) Jean-Philippe Dayraut	(France) Christophe Jouet	(France) Louis Gervoson	(France) Sylvain Dabert	
1	R2	(France) Val Thorens, Savoie	4 December	(France) Jean-Baptiste Dubourg	(France) Eddy Bénézet	(France) Christophe Ferrier	(France) Sylvain Dabert	
2	R1	Le Pas de la Case, Andorra	9 December	(France) Benjamin Rivière	(France) Jacques Wolff	(France) Christophe Ferrier	(France) Sylvain Dabert	
2	R2	Le Pas de la Case, Andorra	10 December	(France) Jean-Baptiste Dubourg	(France) Nathanaël Berthon	(France) Christophe Ferrier	(France) Vivian Dabert	
3	R1	(France) Alpe d'Huez, Isère	16 December	(France) Olivier Panis	(France) Eddy Bénézet	(France) Christophe Ferrier	(France) Sylvain Dabert	
3	R2	(France) Alpe d'Huez, Isère	17 December	(France) Romain Grosjean	(France) Nathanaël Berthon	(France) Christophe Ferrier	(France) Sylvain Dabert	
2017
4	R1	(France) Isola 2000, Alpes-Maritimes	6 January	(France) Jean-Philippe Dayraut	(France) Didier Thoral	(France) Christophe Ferrier	(France) Vivien Gonnet	
4	R2	(France) Isola 2000, Alpes-Maritimes	7 January	(France) Franck Lagorce	(France) Didier Thoral	(France) Vincent Beltoise	(France) Vivien Gonnet	
5	R1	(France) Serre Chevalier, Hautes-Alpes	14 January	(France) Jean-Baptiste Dubourg	(France) Christian Beroujon	(France) Aurélien Panis	R1	(France) Sylvain Dabert
5	R1	(France) Serre Chevalier, Hautes-Alpes	14 January	(France) Jean-Baptiste Dubourg	(France) Christian Beroujon	(France) Aurélien Panis	R2	(France) Sylvain Dabert
5	R2	(France) Serre Chevalier, Hautes-Alpes	15 January	(France) Olivier Panis	(France) Nathanaël Berthon	(France) Aurélien Panis	R3	(France) Julien Colomban
5	R2	(France) Serre Chevalier, Hautes-Alpes	15 January	(France) Olivier Panis	(France) Nathanaël Berthon	(France) Aurélien Panis	R4	(France) Sylvain Dabert
6	R1	(France) Lans-en-Vercors, Isère	20 January	(France) Benjamin Rivière	(France) Eddy Bénézet	(France) Vincent Beltoise	(France) Vivian Dabert	
6	R2	(France) Lans-en-Vercors, Isère	21 January	(France) Benjamin Rivière	(France) Nathanaël Berthon	(France) Vincent Beltoise	(France) Sylvain Dabert	
7		(France) Super Besse, Puy-de-Dôme	28 January	(France) Jean-Philippe Dayraut	(France) Eddy Bénézet	(France) Christophe Ferrier	R1	(France) Sylvain Dabert
7		(France) Super Besse, Puy-de-Dôme	28 January	(France) Jean-Philippe Dayraut	(France) Eddy Bénézet	(France) Christophe Ferrier	R2	(France) Sylvain Dabert

Notes

- Both the AMV Cup Final and Super Final were always run on the last day of the event with the exception of Serre Chevalier, where the first Final and Super Final were run on the first day and the second Final and Super Final were run on the last day.

== Championship standings ==
=== Points systems ===
Elite Pro/Elite

Points were awarded for both the two Qualifying sessions, Super Pole and the Super Final. Only the best result of both Qualifying sessions counted. The best time of a driver decided the classification in case of a tie break. For example, if Driver A became first in Q1 and eighth in Q2 and Driver B became second in Q1 and first in Q2, but Driver A set the best time, then A would receive the most points. The sum of the points received after Qualifying and Super Pole decided the starting grid for the Super Final. There was no Super Pole in the Elite championship. Points were awarded based on the results as shown in the chart below.
In Lans-en-Vercors and Super Besse the field was split up into two. The top eight drivers after Qualifying (and Super Pole) raced in a normal Super Final and the other drivers raced in a Final. Because eight drivers raced in the Super Final, the winner of the Final was classified as ninth.

Position	**1st**	**2nd**	**3rd**	**4th**	**5th**	**6th**	**7th**	**8th**	**9th**	**10th**	**11th**	**12th**	**13th**	**14th**	FL
Qualifying	45	42	40	39	38	37	36	35	34	33	32	31	30	29	–
Super Pole	5	4	3	2	1	0	0	0	0	0	0	0	0	0	–
Super Final	15	14	12	11	10	9	8	7	6	5	4	3	2	1	1

Électrique

The Électrique championship had the same scoring system as the Elite Pro and Elite championships only with different number of points and the Super Final was called a Final. Also in contrast to the Elite Pro championship, there was no Super Pole.

Position	**1st**	**2nd**	**3rd**	**4th**	**5th**	**6th**	**7th**	**8th**	**9th**	**10th**	**11th**	**12th**	FL
Qualifying	24	22	20	19	18	17	16	15	14	13	12	11	–
Final	12	11	10	9	8	7	6	5	4	3	2	1	1

AMV Cup

Points are awarded based on finishing positions of the Final and Super Final as shown in the chart below.

Position	**1st**	**2nd**	**3rd**	**4th**	**5th**	**6th**	**7th**	**8th**	**9th**	**10th**	**11th**	**12th**	**13th**	**14th**	**15th**	**16th**
(Super) Final	25	20	16	13	12	11	10	9	8	7	6	5	4	3	2	1

Points dropped

In the Elite Pro, Elite and Electrique championships each driver's two lowest-scoring rounds were dropped from their total.

=== Drivers' championships ===
==== Elite Pro ====
Pos.	Driver	VTH (France)				PCA (Andorra)				HUE (France)				ISO (France)				SCH (France)				LVE (France)						SBE (France)			Points
Pos.	Driver	Q	SF1	Q	SF2	Q	SF1	Q	SF2	Q	SF1	Q	SF2	Q	SF1	Q	SF2	Q	SF1	Q	SF2	Q	F1	SF1	Q	F2	SF2	Q	F	SF	Points
1	(France) Jean-Baptiste Dubourg	4^{3}	2	1^{5}	**1**	2^{4}	4	4^{4}	1	3^{4}	2	(8)	(4)	2^{5}	4	3^{1}	2	1^{1}	**1**	(3^{5})	(5)	4^{1}		3	2^{2}		2	3^{3}		3	639 (738)
2	(France) Jean-Philippe Dayraut	2^{2}	1	4^{1}	3	(3^{5})	(8)	1^{2}	**2**	2^{3}	9	2^{3}	2	1^{4}	**1**	2^{3}	3	2^{Ret}	4	6	4	(5^{Ret})		(8)	5^{4}		4	1^{2}		**1**	634 (730)
3	(France) Olivier Panis	9	5	5^{2}	5	4^{2}	2	5^{3}	3	1^{1}	**1**	(3^{4})	(11)	3^{3}	3	4^{5}	4	(12)	(12)	1^{1}	**1**	3^{2}		2	3^{1}		3	2^{1}		2	626 (703)
4	(France) Benjamin Rivière	1^{1}	**12**	7	6	1^{1}	**1**	7	5	5^{2}	3	7	3	4^{1}	2	5^{4}	5	(9)	(9)	(9)	(8)	1^{3}		**1**	1^{3}		**1**	6		4	601 (684)
5	(France) Franck Lagorce	(6)	(11)	2^{3}	2	5^{3}	3	8	4	(6)	(10)	5^{5}	5	5^{2}	7	1^{2}	**1**	5^{4}	5	4^{3}	2	2^{4}		6	4^{5}		7	4^{4}		5	589 (674)
6	(France) Benoît Tréluyer	12	6	6	7	7	7	2^{2}	7	WD	WD	(6)	(DNS)	8	6	6	8	7	8	2^{4}	3	11	10		7		6	8		6	510 (547)
7	(France) Olivier Pernaut	3^{5}	3	9	8	9	5	10	9	9	6	11	9	6	5	7	6	4^{3}	3	8	6	(9)	(13)		8		8	(10)	(DNS)		501 (574)
8	(France) Bertrand Balas	8	9	(8)	(10)	6	11	3^{5}	6	7	5	10	6	7	10	8	7	6	6	(7)	(DNS)	7		5	6		5	9	**9**		494 (571)
9	(France) Gérald Fontanel	10	7	(11)	(12)	11	9	6	10	10	8	9	8	9	8	10	11	11	10	11	9	(12)	(11)		10	10		11	10		441 (513)
10	(France) Gilles Stievenart					10	10	11	11	11	7	12	7	11	11	11	9	10	11	12	10							13	11		343
11	(France) Adrien Tambay	5^{4}	10	3^{4}	4	8	6	9	8	4^{5}	4	4^{2}	10																		282
12	(France) Lionel Daziano																	8	7	10	7	10	9		11	13		5^{5}		8	210
13	(France) Andréa Dubourg	7	4	12	9																	8		7	12	12					164
14	(France) Romain Grosjean									8	11	1^{1}	**1**																		106
15	(France) Didier Thoral																	3^{2}	2	5^{2}	11										105
16	(France) Thierry Joncoux																					13	12		13	11		12	12		103
17	(France) Evens Stievenart																					6		4	9	**9**					91
18	(France) Nicolas Jamin													10	9	9	10														80
19	(France) Christian Beroujon	11	8	10	11																										78
20	(France) Christophe Jouet																											7		7	45

Colour	Result
Gold	Winner
Silver	Second place
Bronze	Third place
Green	Points classification
Blue	Non-points classification
Blue	Non-classified finish (NC)
Purple	Retired, not classified (Ret)
Red	Did not qualify (DNQ)
Red	Did not pre-qualify (DNPQ)
Black	Disqualified (DSQ)
White	Did not start (DNS)
White	Withdrew (WD)
White	Race cancelled (C)
Blank	Did not practice (DNP)
Blank	Did not arrive (DNA)
Blank	Excluded (EX)

**Bold** – Pole position
Italics – Fastest time in (Super) Final
(parentheses) - Round dropped from total

Notes

- Positions under 'Q' indicate the classification after Qualifying, but before Super Pole. ^{1} ^{2} ^{3} ^{4} ^{5} refers to the classification of the drivers after Super Pole.

==== Elite ====
Pos.	Driver	VTH (France)				PCA (Andorra)				HUE (France)				ISO (France)				SCH (France)				LVE (France)						SBE (France)			Points
Pos.	Driver	Q	SF1	Q	SF2	Q	SF1	Q	SF2	Q	SF1	Q	SF2	Q	SF1	Q	SF2	Q	SF1	Q	SF2	Q	F1	SF1	Q	F2	SF2	Q	F	SF	Points
1	(France) Nathanaël Berthon	2	3	2	2	1	**9**	1	**1**	(2)	(8)	2	1	4	4	(5)	(4)	2	6	1	**1**	3		3	1		**1**	3		2	614 (714)
2	(France) Eddy Bénézet	4	2	1	**1**	4	2	5	5	1	**1**	(9)	(7)	2	2	3	3	3	2	(5)	(12)	1		**1**	6		5	1		**1**	612 (697)
3	(France) Jacques Wolff	(7)	(6)	(5)	(10)	2	1	2	2	4	3	4	5	7	6	6	6	4	3	3	3	7		6	3		3	6		5	562 (653)
4	(France) Margot Laffite	6	5	(8)	(5)	5	6	4	4	3	2	6	4	3	5	2	2	6	5	6	5	(8)		(7)	4		4	4		3	556 (646)
5	(France) Didier Thoral	3	10	(6)	(8)	6	3	6	6	8	5	8	6	1	**1**	1	**1**	(8)	(8)	7	6	2		2	7		7	2		8	551 (631)
6	(France) Sylvain Pussier	5	4	4	3	8	4	3	3	7	6	5	3	5	3	(10)	(9)	5	4	4	4	6		8	(9)	(**9**)		5		4	546 (628)
7	(France) Christian Beroujon					3	5	7	7	6	4	7	8	8	10	4	5	1	**1**	2	2	5		5	5		6	7		6	539
8	(France) Bérénice Demoustier	8	7	10	6	9	10	10	9	9	7	1	**10**	6	7	8	8	7	7	8	7	(11)	(11)		(10)	(10)		9	**9**		480 (556)
9	(France) Emmanuel Moinel	9	8	7	4	7	7	8	8	5	9	3	2	(11)	(11)	(11)	(11)	12	10	10	8	9	**9**		8		8	12	11		477 (551)
10	(France) Joël Lopez	10	9	9	9	10	8	9	10	10	10	10	9	10	9	7	7	9	9	9	9	10	10		(11)	(11)		(11)	(12)		448 (521)
11	(France) Firmin Cadeddu																					4		4	2		2	8		7	151
12	(Lebanon) Nabil Karam													9	8	9	10											10	10		121
13	(France) Christophe Jouet	1	**1**	3	7																										110
14	(France) Romain Delage																	10	11	11	10										76
15	(France) Arnaud Dugrand Camp Sec																	11	12	12	11										72
16	(France) Pascal Dugrand Camp Sec																					12	12		12	12					70
	(France) Dominique Chianale	WD	WD	WD	WD																										0

==== Electrique ====
Pos.	Driver	VTH (France)				PCA (Andorra)				HUE (France)				ISO (France)				SCH (France)				LVE (France)				SBE (France)		Points
Pos.	Driver	Q	F1	Q	F2	Q	F1	Q	F2	Q	F1	Q	F2	Q	F1	Q	F2	Q	F1	Q	F2	Q	F1	Q	F2	Q	F	Points
1	(France) Christophe Ferrier	2	2	1	**1**	1	**1**	2	1	1	**1**	1	**1**	1	**1**	2	3	(5)	(4)	2	2	2	2	(5)	(5)	1	**1**	387 (440)
2	(France) Aurélien Panis	3	5	2	3	(4)	(5)	4	4	2	2	2	2	2	2	3	2	1	**1**	1	**1**	(5)	(5)	2	2	3	3	355 (408)
3	(France) Vincent Beltoise	4	3	5	6	6	6	3	3	(4)	(10)	5	4	4	4	1	**1**	4	3	5	3	1	**1**	1	**1**	(6)	(12)	330 (370)
4	(France) Louis Gervoson	1	**1**	3	2	3	2	6	5	3	3	4	3	3	3	6	5	3	6	4	8	6	6	(6)	(9)	(4)	(11)	314 (356)
5	(France) Julien Andlauer	7	9	7	7	(7)	(11)	(7)	(DNS)	6	4	7	6	5	6	7	7	2	2	3	4	3	3	3	3	2	2	294 (328)
6	(France) Nyls Stievenart	6	6	6	5	8	4	8	7	9	6	(10)	(7)	7	7	4	4	6	5	6	5	(7)	(9)	8	8	8	5	258 (297)
7	(France) Clémentine Lhoste	9	8	(10)	(10)	(10)	(10)	10	8	7	5	8	10	8	8	8	8	7	7	7	6	8	7	9	7	9	9	223 (255)
8	(France) Nicolas Prost	5	4	4	4	5	8	5	6	5	8	6	5													5	4	178
9	(France) Matthieu Vaxivière					2	3	1	**2**																	7	7	89
10	(France) Louis Rousset	8	7	8	8	9	7	9	9																			79
11	(France) Camille Lacourt	10	11	11	11													9	8	8	7							69
12	(France) Arnaud Tsamere					11	9	11	10					9	9	9	9											67
13	(Monaco) Stéphane Ortelli																					4	4	4	4			56
14	(France) Guillaume Pley	11	10	9	9																					10	6	53
15	(France) Julien Fébreau													6	5	5	6											50
16	(France) Renaud Lavillenie									8	7	3	9															45
17	(France) Bruce Jouanny																					9	8	7	6			42
18	(France) Florent Manaudou																	8	9	9	9							37
19	(France) Julien Absalon									10	9	9	8															36
20	(France) Fabien Gilot																									11	8	17
21	(France) Gonzague Dambricourt																									12	10	14

==== AMV Cup ====
Pos.	Driver	VTH (France)		PCA (Andorra)		HUE (France)		ISO (France)		SCH (France)				LVE (France)		SBE (France)		Points
Pos.	Driver	F	SF	F	SF	F	SF	F	SF	F1	SF1	F2	SF2	F	SF	F	SF	Points
1	(France) Sylvain Dabert	**1**	**1**	**1**	**2**	**1**	**1**	9	3	1	1	5	**1**	**1**	**1**	**1**	**1**	356
2	(France) Vivian Dabert	4	6	2	1	2	2	3	**4**	4	4	4	3	2	2	4	6	257
3	(France) Vivien Gonnet	3	2	16	16	7	8	**1**	1	**2**	2	3	4	7	3	8	3	227
4	(France) Noël Duvert	6	16	3	3	4	3	2	2	6	6	2	5	4	4	3	4	222
5	(France) Elie Vecchi	5	3	7	6	3	4	4	5	7	8	6	6	10	9	9	10	174
6	(France) Romain Gioffre	16	8	10	13	6	12	5	6	8	7	7	7	5	6	2	2	162
7	(France) Loïc Cartier	10	9	6	9	5	6	11	10	9	9	9	10	WD	WD	10	8	117
8	(France) Randy Peresson	14	10	8	5	8	7	13	12	10	18	11	13	9	8	12	13	102
9	(France) Etienne Parseihian	12	14	13	10	12	16	7	9	14	12	12	12	11	12	11	11	84
10	(France) Randy de Puniet							10	11	11	13	10	8	8	5	7	7	80
11	(France) Julien Colomban									3	**3**	**1**	2					77
12	(France) Maxime Thinon	15	15	11	11	13	13	6	8	12	10	17	11	WD	WD			62
13	(France) Germain Vincenot	2	4	4	4													59
14	(France) Sébastien Valla	13	12	14	15	11	11	14	13	16	14	15	14	14	11	14	16	53
15	(France) Cyprien Poncet	11	13	15	14	10	9	12	14	15	16	14	16	13	14	17	17	52
16	(France) Julien Chavlard									13	11	8	9					27
17	(France) Mickaël Amodeo							WD	WD	5	5	18	DNS					24
18	(France) Maxime Emery															5	5	24
19	(Andorra) Xavi España Muñoz			5	7													22
20	(France) Ludovic Lucquin	8	5															21
21	(France) Jérome Bas													6	7			21
22	(France) Thomas Ramette					9	5											20
23	(France) Maxime Jeoffre															6	9	19
24	(France) Adrien Goguet							8	7									19
25	(France) Kévin Duvert													3	15			18
26	(France) Mickaël Falquet	9	7															18
27	(Andorra) Alex Antor			9	8													17
28	(France) Sébastien Midali	7	11															16
29	(France) Vincent Philippe													12	10			12
30	(France) Guillaume Spaeth					14	10											10
31	(Andorra) Daniel Fontanet			12	12													10
32	(France) Benoît Tréluyer															13	12	9
33	(France) Cédric Chalvin									17	15	13	14					9
34	(France) Fabien Gervasoni													15	13			6
35	(France) Kévin Guillot					15	14											5
36	(France) Adrian Parassol															16	14	4
37	(France) Johan Wang Chang															15	15	4
38	(France) Florian Teyssier					16	15											3
39	(France) Matthieu Cayrol									18	17	15	17					2
	(France) Mickaël Ortega					WD	WD											0

=== Teams' championship ===
Only the points earned by the best driver of a car counted towards the teams' championship, with the exception of the Elite entries of Mazda France and Rhônes Alpes Sport 38. Mazda's Thoral and Wolff switched car numbers after Round 3, but all points scored in the season by both drivers counted. Also points scored by two RAC 38 Elite drivers, Cadeddu and Delage, counted. Only the best two cars in Elite Pro and the best two cars in Elite of one team were eligible to score points.

Pos.	Team	No.	VTH (France)				PCA (Andorra)				HUE (France)				ISO (France)				SCH (France)				LVE (France)						SBE (France)			Points
Pos.	Team	No.	Q	SF1	Q	SF2	Q	SF1	Q	SF2	Q	SF1	Q	SF2	Q	SF1	Q	SF2	Q	SF1	Q	SF2	Q	F1	SF1	Q	F2	SF2	Q	F	SF	Points
1	(Belgium) Belgian Audi Club Team WRT	5	9	5	5^{2}	5	4^{2}	2	5^{3}	3	1^{1}	**1**	(3^{4})	(11)	3^{3}	3	4^{5}	4	(12)	(12)	1^{1}	**1**	3^{2}		2	3^{1}		3	2^{1}		2	2230 (2520)
1	(Belgium) Belgian Audi Club Team WRT	5B	8	7	10	6	9	10	10	9	9	7	1	**10**	6	7	8	8	7	7	8	7	(11)	(11)		(10)	(10)		9	**9**		2230 (2520)
1	(Belgium) Belgian Audi Club Team WRT	10	12	6	6	7	7	7	2^{2}	7	WD	WD	(6)	(DNS)	8	6	6	8	7	8	2^{4}	3	11	10		7		6	8		6	2230 (2520)
1	(Belgium) Belgian Audi Club Team WRT	10B	2	3	2	2	1	**9**	1	**1**	(2)	(8)	2	1	4	4	(5)	(4)	2	6	1	**1**	3		3	1		**1**	3		2	2230 (2520)
2	(France) CMR	6	2^{2}	1	4^{1}	3	(3^{5})	(8)	1^{2}	**2**	2^{3}	9	2^{3}	2	1^{4}	**1**	2^{3}	3	2^{Ret}	4	6	4	(5^{Ret})		(8)	5^{4}		4	1^{2}		**1**	2226 (2479)
2	(France) CMR	6B	4	2	1	**1**	4	2	5	5	1	**1**	(9)	(7)	2	2	3	3	3	2	(5)	(12)	1		**1**	6		5	1		**1**	2226 (2479)
2	(France) CMR	9	10	7	(11)	(12)	11	9	6	10	10	8	9	8	9	8	10	11	11	10	11	9	(12)	(11)		10	10		11	10		2226 (2479)
2	(France) CMR	11B					3	5	7	7	6	4	7	8	8	10	4	5	1	**1**	2	2	5		5	5		6	7		6	2226 (2479)
3	Mazda France	2	(6)	(11)	2^{3}	2	5^{3}	3	8	4	(6)	(10)	5^{5}	5	5^{2}	7	1^{2}	**1**	5^{4}	5	4^{3}	2	2^{4}		6	4^{5}		7	4^{4}		5	1984 (2240)
3	Mazda France	2B	3	10	(6)	(8)	6	3	6	6	8	5	8	6	7	6	6	6	4	3	3	3	7		6	3		3	6		5	1984 (2240)
3	Mazda France	4	5^{4}	10	3^{4}	4	8	6	9	8	4^{5}	4	4^{2}	10																		1984 (2240)
3	Mazda France	4B	(7)	(6)	(5)	(10)	2	1	2	2	4	3	4	5	1	**1**	1	**1**	(8)	(8)	7	6	2		2	7		7	2		8	1984 (2240)
4	(France) DA Racing	1	4^{3}	2	1^{5}	**1**	2^{4}	4	4^{4}	1	3^{4}	2	(8)	(4)	2^{5}	4	3^{1}	2	1^{1}	**1**	(3^{5})	(5)	4^{1}		3	2^{2}		2	3^{3}		3	1390 (1563)
4	(France) DA Racing	1B	1	**1**	3	7																										1390 (1563)
4	(France) DA Racing	7	7	4	12	9					8	11	1^{1}	**1**									8		7	12	12		7		7	1390 (1563)
4	(France) DA Racing	7B	9	8	7	4	7	7	8	8	5	9	3	2	(11)	(11)	(11)	(11)	12	10	10	8	9	**9**		8		8	12	11		1390 (1563)
5	(France) Saintéloc Racing	8	3^{5}	3	9	8	9	5	10	9	9	6	11	9	6	5	7	6	4^{3}	3	8	6	(9)	(13)		8		8	(10)	(DNS)		1234 (1397)
5	(France) Saintéloc Racing	8B	6	5	(8)	(5)	5	6	4	4	3	2	6	4	3	5	2	2	6	5	6	5	(8)		(7)	4		4	4		3	1234 (1397)
5	(France) Saintéloc Racing	14																	3^{2}	2	5^{2}	11	13	12		13	11		12	12		1234 (1397)
5	(France) Saintéloc Racing	14B																	11	12	12	11	12	12		12	12		10	10		1234 (1397)
6	(France) PUSSIER Auto / Réseau PEUGEOT	12	8	9	(8)	(10)	6	11	3^{5}	6	7	5	10	6	7	10	8	7	6	6	(7)	(DNS)	7		5	6		5	9	**9**		1040 (1199)
6	(France) PUSSIER Auto / Réseau PEUGEOT	12B	5	4	4	3	8	4	3	3	7	6	5	3	5	3	(10)	(9)	5	4	4	4	6		8	(9)	(**9**)		5		4	1040 (1199)
7	(France) Rhônes Alpes Sport 38	3	1^{1}	**12**	7	6	1^{1}	**1**	7	5	5^{2}	3	7	3	4^{1}	2	5^{4}	5	(9)	(9)	(9)	(8)	1^{3}		**1**	1^{3}		**1**	6		4	828 (911)
7	(France) Rhônes Alpes Sport 38	3B	WD	WD	WD	WD									9	8	9	10	10	11	11	10	4		4	2		2	8		7	828 (911)

Notes

- The car numbers without B behind them indicate Elite Pro entries and with B behind them indicate Elite entries.
