= Lac des Hermines =

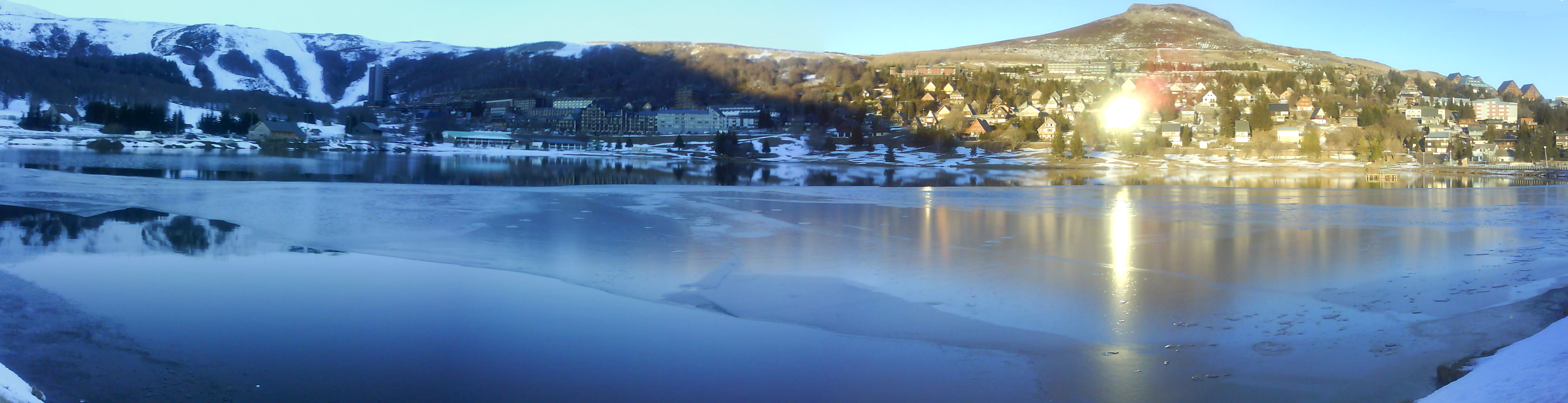

- Location within France
- Location: Puy-de-Dôme
- Coordinates: 45°30′27″N 2°51′23″E
- Basin countries: France
- Surface area: 0.14 km^{2} (0.054 sq mi)
- Max. depth: 9 m (30 ft)
- Surface elevation: 1,350 m (4,430 ft)

Lac des Hermines is an artificial lake near Super-Besse, in Puy-de-Dôme, France. At an elevation of 1350 m, its surface area is 0.14 km^{2}.
