= Stievenart =

Stievenart or Stiévenart is a French surname. Notable people with the surname include:

- Evens Stievenart (born 1983), French long-distance cyclist and racing driver
- Fernand Stiévenart (1862–1922), French landscape painter
- Jean-Hervé Stievenart (1954–2022), French triple jumper

== See also ==
- Michel Stievenard (1937–2026), French footballer
