= Besse-et-Saint-Anastaise =

- Commune
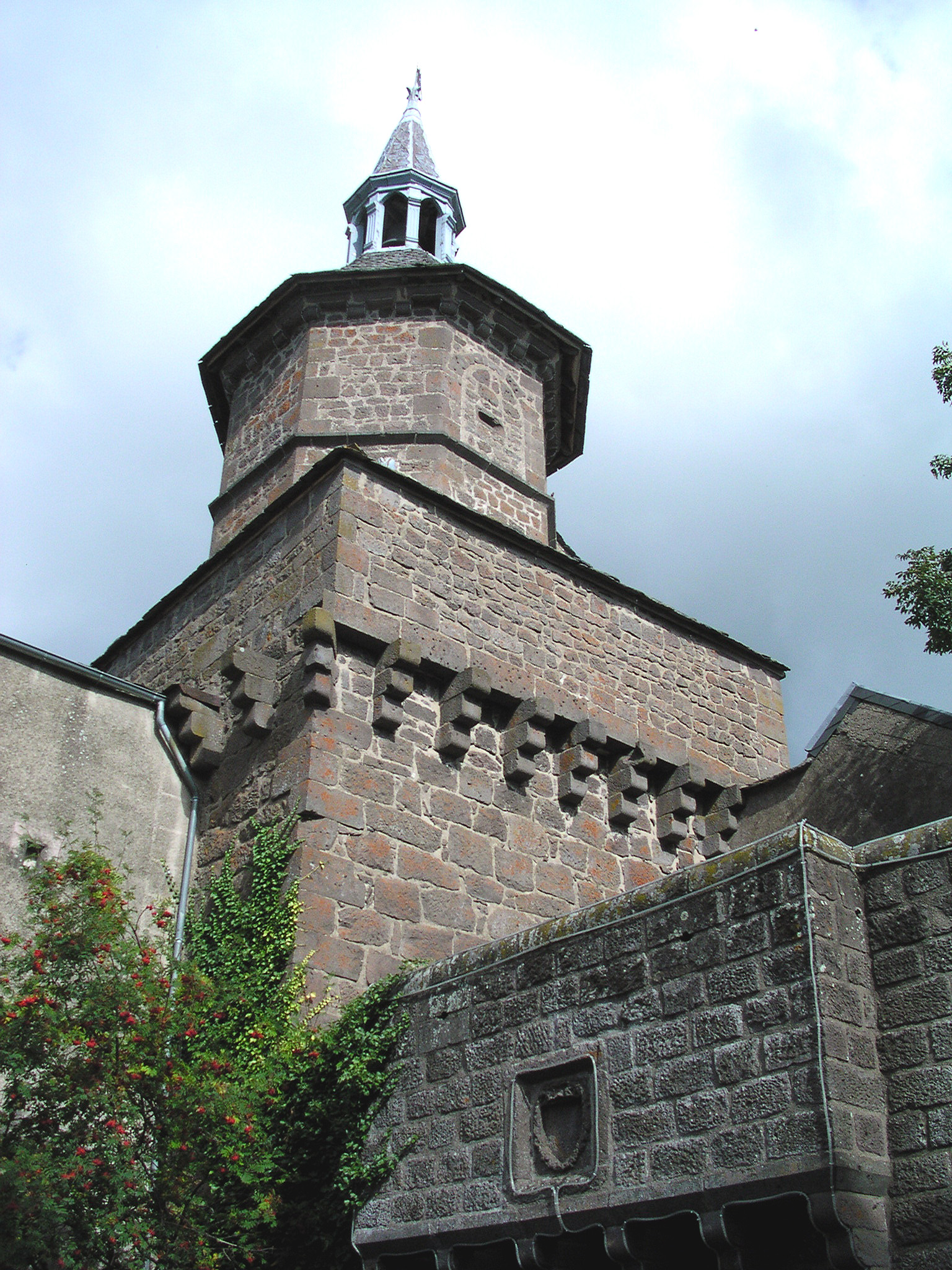
- Beffroy

- Coat of arms
- Location of Besse-et-Saint-Anastaise
- Location within France Location within Auvergne-Rhône-Alpes
- Coordinates: 45°30′50″N 2°56′01″E
- Country: France
- Region: Auvergne-Rhône-Alpes
- Department: Puy-de-Dôme
- Arrondissement: Issoire
- Canton: Le Sancy
- Intercommunality: Massif du Sancy

Government
  - Mayor (2026–32): Lionel Gay
- Area^{1}: 72.38 km^{2} (27.95 sq mi)
- Highest elevation: 1,725 m (5,659 ft)
- Lowest elevation: 805 m (2,641 ft)
- Population (2023): 1,442
  - Density: 19.92/km^{2} (51.60/sq mi)
- Time zone: UTC+01:00 (CET)
  - Summer (DST): UTC+02:00 (CEST)
- INSEE/Postal code: 63038 /63610
- ^{1} French Land Register data, which excludes lakes, ponds, glaciers > 1 km^{2} (0.386 sq mi or 247 acres) and river estuaries.

Besse-et-Saint-Anastaise (French pronunciation: [bɛs e sɛ̃.t‿anastɛz]; Occitan: Bèssa), also known as Besse-en-Chandesse (its official name from 2 April 1961 to 1 July 1973), or Besse (its name before 1961), is a commune in the Puy-de-Dôme department in Auvergne-Rhône-Alpes in central France.

The nearby ski resort of Super-Besse hosted the first mountain finish of the 2008 Tour de France.

== Geography ==
The river Rhue has its source in the commune.

== Population ==
Historical population
Year	Pop.	±% p.a.
1968	1,530	—
1975	1,767	+2.08%
1982	1,763	−0.03%
1990	1,799	+0.25%
1999	1,672	−0.81%
2007	1,659	−0.10%
2012	1,519	−1.75%
2017	1,504	−0.20%
2023	1,442	−0.70%
Source: INSEE

== See also ==
- Arthur Besse
- Nicolas Bourbaki
- Communes of the Puy-de-Dôme department
