= Aurélien Panis =

French racing driver (born 1994)

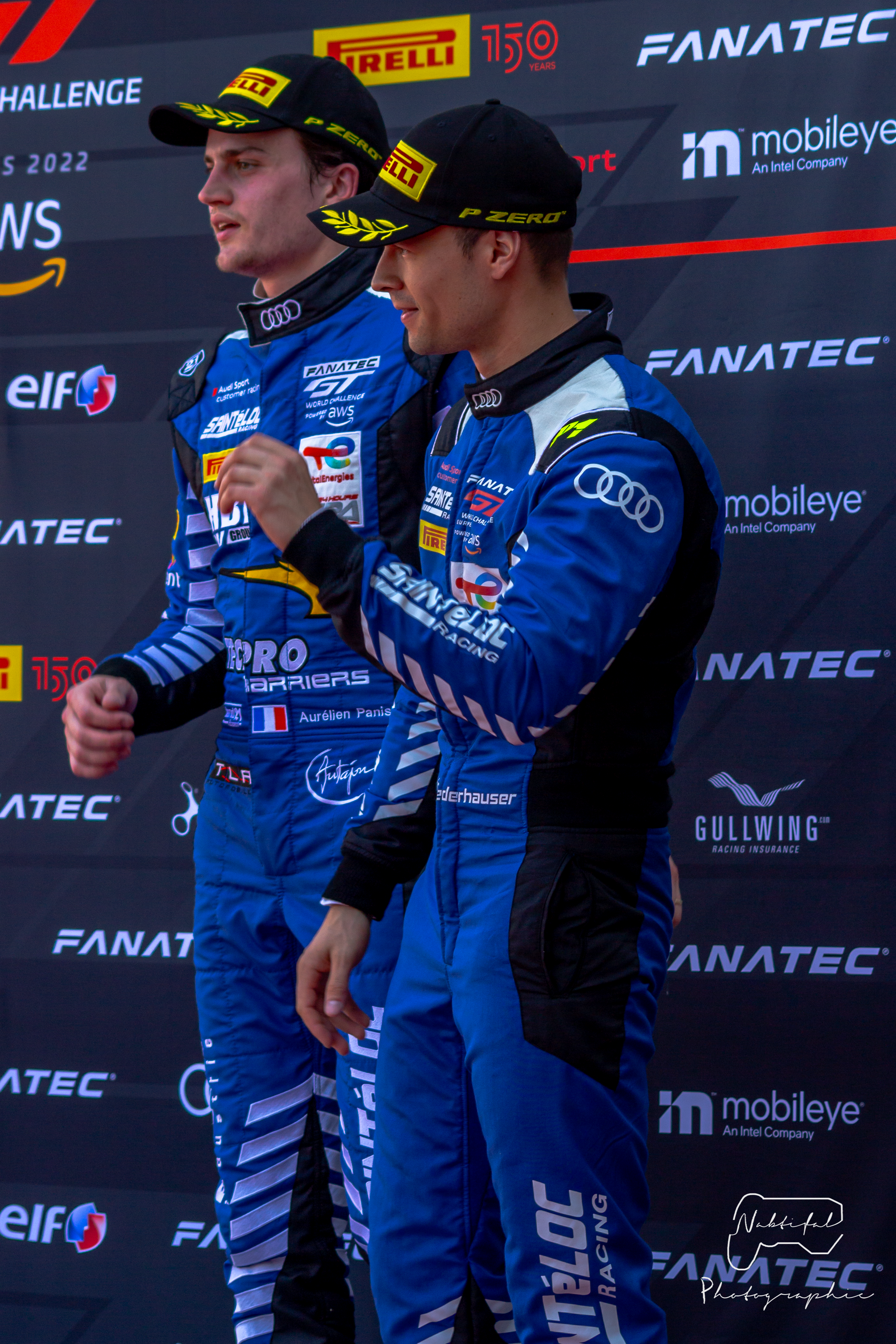
- Panis (left) with Patric Niederhauser in 2022.
- Nationality: (France) French
- Born: Aurélien Antoine Philippe Panis; 29 October 1994 (age 32) Saint-Martin-d'Hères, France
- Relatives: Olivier Panis (father)

GT World Challenge Europe career
- Debut season: 2020
- Current team: GetSpeed Team
- Categorisation: FIA Silver
- Car number: 6
- Former teams: Boutsen Ginion Racing, Saintéloc Racing, Tech 1 Racing
- Starts: 83
- Championships: 0
- Wins: 0
- Podiums: 2
- Poles: 1
- Fastest laps: 4
- Best finish: 6th in 2022
- Finished last season: 17th

Previous series
- 2017–2019 2015–2016 2012–2014 2013–2014 2012 2011: WTCC; Formula V8 3.5 Series; Eurocup Formula Renault 2.0; Formula Renault 2.0 NEC; Formula Renault 2.0 Alps; French F4 Championship

Championship titles
- 2019–20, 2022–23 2017–18: Andros Trophy - Elite Pro Class; Andros Électrique Trophy

Aurélien Antoine Philippe Panis (born 29 October 1994) is a French professional racing driver, currently competing in the 2026 GT World Challenge Europe for the GetSpeed Team. He is best known for being the son of former Formula 1 driver, Olivier Panis. Before GT racing, he has also competed in the World Touring Car Championship (WTCC).

== Career ==
Panis began his career in 2011 in the national French F4 Championship. He finished tenth. In 2012, he joined Eurocup Formula Renault 2.0 and Formula Renault 2.0 Alps, but scored no points in Eurocup, and only 26 in Alps. He became a member of the Caterham Racing Academy, from Caterham F1 Team in 2013, and scored his first points in Eurocup Formula Renault 2.0. In 2014, he left Caterham but won two victories: one in Eurocup and another one in Northern European Cup.

Panis joined Formula Renault 3.5 Series for 2015, with Tech 1 Racing. Next year, in the series - which was renamed as Formula V8 3.5 Series - he scored two wins and finished the championship in 5th position.

In 2017, Panis decided to switch for touring cars as he started the year in WTCC with a Honda Civic TC1 car at Zengő Motorsport. But after five rounds, he split with the Hungarian team and went towards TCR International Series where he participated with the Boutsen Ginion Racing squad. In the later championship he took one win with the Belgian team's Honda Civic TCR.

In 2019, Panis would race in World Touring Car Cup (FIA WTCR) with an Audi RS3 LMS at Comtoyou Racing.

== Racing record ==
=== Career summary ===
Season	Series	Team	Races	Wins	Poles	FLaps	Podiums	Points	Position
2011	French F4 Championship	Auto Sport Academy	14	0	0	1	2	46	10th
2012	Eurocup Formula Renault 2.0	RC Formula	6	0	0	0	0	0	NC
2012	Formula Renault 2.0 Alps	RC Formula	12	0	0	0	0	26	17th
2013	Eurocup Formula Renault 2.0	Prema Powerteam	14	0	0	0	0	14	18th
2013	Formula Renault 2.0 NEC	RC Formula	5	0	0	0	0	45	27th
2014	Eurocup Formula Renault 2.0	ART Junior Team	14	1	1	0	2	82	9th
2014	Formula Renault 2.0 NEC	ART Junior Team	7	1	1	0	2	77	19th
2015	Formula Renault 3.5 Series	Tech 1 Racing	17	0	0	0	0	42	12th
2015-16	Andros Trophy - Électrique	Allianz	13	3	4	4	6	337	**2nd**
2016	Formula V8 3.5 Series	Arden Motorsport	18	2	1	0	3	183	5th
2016-17	Andros Trophy - Électrique	Plastic'Up	13	2	2	2	9	355	**2nd**
2017	World Touring Car Championship	Zengő Motorsport	9	0	0	0	0	2	18th
2017	TCR International Series	Boutsen Ginion Racing	7	1	0	2	1	27	20th
2017	TCR BeNeLux Touring Car Championship	Boutsen Ginion Racing	3	0	0	0	0	30	28th
2017–18	Andros Trophy - Électrique	Plastic'Up	13	5	5	4	10	370	**1st**
2018	World Touring Car Cup	Comtoyou Racing	30	0	0	0	0	55	17th
2018	European Le Mans Series - LMP2	IDEC Sport	1	0	0	0	0	0.25	35th
2018–19	Andros Trophy - Elite Pro	Saintéloc Racing	11	1	1	1	5	620	**3rd**
2019	World Touring Car Cup	Comtoyou Team DHL CUPRA Racing	30	0	0	1	1	127	17th
2019	Blancpain GT World Challenge Europe	Tech 1 Racing	6	0	0	0	0	6	20th
2019	GT4 European Series - Silver	Selleslagh Racing Team	2	0	0	0	0	7	24th
2019–20	Andros Trophy - Elite Pro	Saintéloc Racing	10	3	2	2	7	543	**1st**
2020	GT World Challenge Europe Sprint Cup	Tech 1 Racing	10	0	2	1	0	14.5	16th
2020	GT World Challenge Europe Sprint Cup - Silver	Tech 1 Racing	10	1	2	4	2	60	7th
2020	GT World Challenge Europe Endurance Cup	Tech 1 Racing	4	0	0	0	0	0	NC
2020	GT World Challenge Europe Endurance Cup - Silver	Tech 1 Racing	4	0	1	0	1	44	8th
2020	French GT4 Cup - Silver	CMR	12	1	1	0	4	159	5th
2020–21	Andros Trophy - Elite Pro	Saintéloc Racing	11	1	1	1	6	522	**2nd**
2021	GT World Challenge Europe Sprint Cup	Saintéloc Racing	10	0	0	0	0	20.5	14th
2021	Intercontinental GT Challenge	Saintéloc Racing	1	0	0	0	0	8	17th
2021–22	Andros Trophy - Elite Pro	Saintéloc Racing	9	1	1	2	6	532	**3rd**
2022	GT World Challenge Europe Sprint Cup	Saintéloc Racing	9	0	0	0	2	49.5	6th
2022	GT World Challenge Europe Endurance Cup	Saintéloc Racing	5	0	0	0	0	0	NC
2022–23	Andros Trophy - Elite Pro	Saintéloc Racing	10	4	4	2	5	544	**1st**
2023	GT World Challenge Europe Sprint Cup	Boutsen VDS	10	0	0	0	0	8.5	17th
2023	GT World Challenge Europe Sprint Cup - Gold	Boutsen VDS	10	3	2	1	6	105	**2nd**
2023	GT World Challenge Europe Endurance Cup	Boutsen VDS	5	0	0	0	0	0	NC
2023	GT World Challenge Europe Endurance Cup - Gold	Boutsen VDS	5	1	0	1	2	83	4th
2024	GT World Challenge Europe Endurance Cup	Boutsen VDS	5	0	0	0	0	0	NC
2024	GT World Challenge Europe Sprint Cup	Boutsen VDS	10	0	0	0	0	10.5	16th
2024	GT World Challenge Europe Sprint Cup - Silver	Boutsen VDS	10	3	1	2	7	97	**3rd**
2025	GT World Challenge Europe Endurance Cup	Boutsen VDS	5	0	0	0	0	2	26th
2025	GT World Challenge Europe Sprint Cup	Boutsen VDS	10	0	0	0	0	8.5	17th
2025	GT World Challenge Europe Sprint Cup - Silver	Boutsen VDS	10	2	2	1	7	96	**2nd**
2026	GT World Challenge Europe Endurance Cup	GetSpeed Team Bartone Bros							
2026	GT World Challenge Europe Sprint Cup	GetSpeed Team Bartone Bros	10	0	0	0	0	0	NC
2026	GT World Challenge Europe Sprint Cup - Silver	GetSpeed Team Bartone Bros	10	1	1	2	2	62	5th

^{*} Season still in progress.

=== Complete French F4 Championship results ===
(key) (Races in bold indicate pole position) (Races in italics indicate fastest lap)

Year	1	2	3	4	5	6	7	8	9	10	11	12	13	14	Pos	Points
2011	LÉD; 1; 8	LÉD; 2; 18	NOG; 1; 11	NOG; 2; 7	PAU; 1 Ret	PAU; 2; 3	VDV; 1; 5	VDV; 2; 11	SPA; 1; 11	SPA; 2; 7	ALB; 1; 7	ALB; 2; 7	LEC; 1; 20	LEC; 2; 3	10th	46

=== Complete Formula Renault 2.0 Alps Series results ===
(key) (Races in bold indicate pole position; races in italics indicate fastest lap)

Year	Team	1	2	3	4	5	6	7	8	9	10	11	12	13	14	Pos	Points
2012	RC Formula	MNZ; 1 Ret	MNZ; 2; 10	PAU; 1; 10	PAU; 2; 6	IMO; 1; 8	IMO; 2 Ret	SPA; 1	SPA; 2	RBR; 1; 11	RBR; 2; 15	MUG; 1; 11	MUG; 2; 7	CAT; 1; 7	CAT; 2; 11	17th	26

=== Complete Eurocup Formula Renault 2.0 results ===
(key) (Races in bold indicate pole position; races in italics indicate fastest lap)

Year	Entrant	1	2	3	4	5	6	7	8	9	10	11	12	13	14	DC	Points
2012	RC Formula	ALC; 1	ALC; 2	SPA; 1	SPA; 2	NÜR; 1	NÜR; 2	MSC; 1	MSC; 2	HUN; 1; 19	HUN; 2; 22	LEC; 1; 27	LEC; 2 Ret	CAT; 1; 18	CAT; 2; 17	NC†	0
2013	Prema Powerteam	ALC; 1; 23	ALC; 2; 23	SPA; 1 Ret	SPA; 2; 18	MSC; 1; 29	MSC; 2; 25	RBR; 1 Ret	RBR; 2; 15	HUN; 1; 17	HUN; 2; 18	LEC; 1 Ret	LEC; 2; 4	CAT; 1; 18	CAT; 2; 9	18th	14
2014	ART Junior Team	ALC; 1; 5	ALC; 2 Ret	SPA; 1; 8	SPA; 2; 28	**MSC**; **1**; 1	MSC; 2; 8	NÜR; 1; 11	NÜR; 2; 11	HUN; 1 DSQ	HUN; 2; 14	LEC; 1; 4	LEC; 2; 2	JER; 1; 9	JER; 2; 17	9th	82

† As Panis was a guest driver, he was ineligible for points

=== Complete Formula Renault 2.0 NEC results ===
(key) (Races in bold indicate pole position) (Races in italics indicate fastest lap)

Year	Entrant	1	2	3	4	5	6	7	8	9	10	11	12	13	14	15	16	17	DC	Points
2013	RC Formula	HOC; 1; 18	HOC; 2; 12	HOC; 3; 21	NÜR; 1; 4	NÜR; 2; 5	SIL; 1	SIL; 2	SPA; 1	SPA; 2	ASS; 1	ASS; 2	MST; 1	MST; 2	MST; 3	ZAN; 1	ZAN; 2	ZAN; 3	27th	45
2014	ART Junior Team	MNZ; 1 Ret	MNZ; 2 Ret	**SIL**; **1**; 2	SIL; 2 Ret	HOC; 1; 6	HOC; 2; 13	**HOC**; **3**; 1	SPA; 1	SPA; 2	ASS; 1	ASS; 2	MST; 1	MST; 2	MST; 3	NÜR; 1	NÜR; 2	NÜR; 3	19th	77

=== Complete Formula V8 3.5 Series results ===
(key) (Races in bold indicate pole position) (Races in italics indicate fastest lap)

Year	Team	1	2	3	4	5	6	7	8	9	10	11	12	13	14	15	16	17	18	Pos.	Points
2015	Tech 1 Racing	ALC; 1; 12	ALC; 2; 13	MON; 1; 7	SPA; 1 Ret	SPA; 2; 7	HUN; 1; 7	HUN; 2; 13	RBR; 1; 8	RBR; 2 Ret	SIL; 1 Ret	SIL; 2; 9	NÜR; 1; 14	NÜR; 2 Ret	BUG; 1; 5	BUG; 2; 6	JER; 1 Ret	JER; 2; 13		12th	42
2016	Arden Motorsport	ALC; 1; 5	ALC; 2; 1	HUN; 1; 4	HUN; 2; 3	**SPA**; **1**; 8	SPA; 2; 5	LEC; 1; 8	LEC; 2; 4	SIL; 1; 5	SIL; 2; 5	RBR; 1; 5	RBR; 2; 1	MNZ; 1; 4	MNZ; 2 Ret	JER; 1; 4	JER; 2 Ret	CAT; 1; 4	CAT; 2; 12	5th	183

=== Complete World Touring Car Championship results ===
(key) (Races in bold indicate pole position) (Races in italics indicate fastest lap)

Year	Team	Car	1	2	3	4	5	6	7	8	9	10	11	12	13	14	15	16	17	18	19	20	DC	Points
2017	Zengő Motorsport	Honda Civic WTCC	MAR; 1; 10	MAR; 2 Ret	ITA; 1 DNS	ITA; 2; 12	HUN; 1; 10	HUN; 2; 14	GER; 1; 13	GER; 2; 12	POR; 1; 11	POR; 2; 16†	ARG; 1	ARG; 2	CHN; 1	CHN; 2	JPN; 1	JPN; 2	MAC; 1	MAC; 2	QAT; 1	QAT; 2	18th	2

^{†} Did not finish the race, but was classified as he completed over 90% of the race distance.

=== Complete TCR International Series results ===
(key) (Races in bold indicate pole position) (Races in italics indicate fastest lap)

Year	Team	Car	1	2	3	4	5	6	7	8	9	10	11	12	13	14	15	16	17	18	19	20	DC	Points
2017	Boutsen Ginion Racing	Honda Civic Type R TCR	RIM; 1	RIM; 2	BHR; 1	BHR; 2	SPA; 1	SPA; 2	MNZ; 1	MNZ; 2	SAL; 1	SAL; 2	HUN; 1	HUN; 2	OSC; 1; 15†	OSC; 2 DNS	CHA; 1; 19	CHA; 2; 1	ZHE; 1; 10	ZHE; 2; 13	DUB; 1; 14	DUB; 2; 13	20th	27

^{†} Did not finish the race, but was classified as he completed over 90% of the race distance.

=== Complete World Touring Car Cup results ===
(key) (Races in bold indicate pole position) (Races in italics indicate fastest lap)

Year	Team	Car	1	2	3	4	5	6	7	8	9	10	11	12	13	14	15	16	17	18	19	20	21	22	23	24	25	26	27	28	29	30	DC	Points
2018	Comtoyou Racing	Audi RS 3 LMS TCR	MAR; 1 Ret	MAR; 2; 14	MAR; 3; 16	HUN; 1; 15	HUN; 2; 20	HUN; 3 Ret	GER; 1; 11	GER; 2; 12	GER; 3; 11	NED; 1; 10	NED; 2 Ret	NED; 3; 13	POR; 1; 16†	POR; 2; 8	POR; 3; 9	SVK; 1; 9	SVK; 2 Ret	SVK; 3; 10	CHN; 1; 10	CHN; 2; 10	CHN; 3; 9	WUH; 1; 9	WUH; 2; 7	WUH; 3; 11	JPN; 1; 13	JPN; 2; 4	JPN; 3; 5	MAC; 1; 16	MAC; 2; 9	MAC; 3 Ret	17th	55
2019	Comtoyou Team DHL CUPRA Racing	CUPRA León TCR	MAR; 1 Ret	MAR; 2; 21	MAR; 3; 19	HUN; 1; 5	HUN; 2; 13	HUN; 3; 11	SVK; 1 Ret	SVK; 2 Ret	SVK; 3; 8	NED; 1; 13	NED; 2; 14	NED; 3; 12	GER; 1; 17	GER; 2; 8	GER; 3; 7	POR; 1; 6	POR; 2; 16	POR; 3; 11	CHN; 1; 6	CHN; 2 Ret	CHN; 3; 6	JPN; 1; 14	JPN; 2; 19	JPN; 3; 17	MAC; 1; 12	MAC; 2 Ret	MAC; 3; 23	MAL; 1; 2	MAL; 2; 11	MAL; 3 Ret	17th	127

^{†} Did not finish the race, but was classified as he completed over 90% of the race distance.

=== Complete European Le Mans Series results ===
Year	Entrant	Class	Chassis	Engine	1	2	3	4	5	6	Rank	Points
2018	IDEC Sport	LMP2	Ligier JS P217	Gibson GK428 4.2 L V8	LEC	MNZ	RBR	SIL	SPA; 14‡	ALG	35th	0.25

^{‡} Half points awarded as less than 75% of race distance was completed.

=== Complete GT World Challenge Europe results ===
==== GT World Challenge Europe Endurance Cup ====
(key) (Races in bold indicate pole position) (Races in italics indicate fastest lap)

Year	Team	Car	Class	1	2	3	4	5	6	7	Pos.	Points
2020	Tech 1 Racing	Lexus RC F GT3	Silver	**IMO**; 19	NÜR; 39	SPA; 6H; 28	SPA; 12H; 43	SPA; 24H; Ret	LEC; 16		8th	44
2022	Saintéloc Junior Team	Audi R8 LMS Evo II	Silver	IMO; 21	LEC; 20	SPA; 6H; Ret	SPA; 12H; Ret	SPA; 24H; Ret	HOC; 12	CAT; 16	5th	43
2023	Boutsen VDS	Audi R8 LMS Evo II	Gold	MNZ; Ret	LEC; 11	SPA; 6H; 14	SPA; 12H; 46	SPA; 24H; 42	NUR; 12	CAT; 13	4th	83
2024	Boutsen VDS	Mercedes-AMG GT3 Evo	Silver	LEC; 21	SPA; 6H; 27	SPA; 12H; 32	SPA; 24H; 40	**NÜR**; 16	MNZ; Ret	JED; 15	3rd	81
2025	Boutsen VDS	Mercedes-AMG GT3 Evo	Silver	LEC; 40	MNZ; 26	SPA; 6H; 18	SPA; 12H; 18	SPA; 24H; 27	NÜR; 9	CAT; 19	2nd	77
2026	GetSpeed Team Bartone Bros	Mercedes-AMG GT3 Evo	Silver	LEC; 33	MNZ; 13	SPA; 6H; 33	SPA; 12H; 26	**SPA**; **24H**; 28	NÜR; 20	ALG	6th*	40*

* Season still in progress.

==== GT World Challenge Europe Sprint Cup ====
(key) (Races in bold indicate pole position) (Races in italics indicate fastest lap)

Year	Team	Car	Class	1	2	3	4	5	6	7	8	9	10	Pos.	Points
2019	Tech 1 Racing	Lexus RC F GT3	Pro	BRH; 1	BRH; 2	MIS; 1	MIS; 2	ZAN; 1; 15	ZAN; 2 Ret	NÜR; 1; 19	NÜR; 2; 5	HUN; 1; 26	HUN; 2; 22	20th	6
2020	Tech 1 Racing	Lexus RC F GT3	Silver	**MIS**; **1** Ret	MIS; 2; 15	**MIS**; **3**; 19	MAG; 1 Ret	MAG; 2; 18	ZAN; 1; 7	ZAN; 2; 4	CAT; 1; 12	CAT; 2; 19	CAT; 3; 8	7th	60
2021	Saintéloc Racing	Audi R8 LMS Evo	Pro	MAG; 1; 26	MAG; 2; 6	ZAN; 1; 9	ZAN; 2; 15	MIS; 1; 4	MIS; 2; 10	BRH; 1; 5	BRH; 2; 11	VAL; 1; 13	VAL; 2; 9	14th	20.5
2022	Saintéloc Racing	Audi R8 LMS Evo II	Pro	BRH; 1; 5	BRH; 2; 6	MAG; 1; 4	MAG; 2; 3	ZAN; 1; 5	ZAN; 2; 7	MIS; 1 Ret	MIS; 2 DNS	VAL; 1; 9	VAL; 2; 2	6th	49.5
2023	Boutsen VDS	Audi R8 LMS Evo II	Gold	**BRH**; **1**; 9	BRH; 2; 26	MIS; 1; 6	MIS; 2 Ret	HOC; 1; 10	**HOC**; **2**; 10	VAL; 1; 29	VAL; 2; 8	ZAN; 1; 20	ZAN; 2; 17	2nd	105
2024	Boutsen VDS	Mercedes-AMG GT3 Evo	Silver	BRH; 1; 6	BRH; 2; 12	MIS; 1; 30	MIS; 2; 32†	HOC; 1; 16	HOC; 2; 12	MAG; 1; 11	MAG; 2; 12	**CAT**; **1**; 5	CAT; 2; 11	3rd	97
2025	Boutsen VDS	Mercedes-AMG GT3 Evo	Silver	BRH; 1; 13	**BRH**; **2**; 10	ZAN; 1; 13	ZAN; 2; 12	MIS; 1 Ret	MIS; 2; 10	MAG; 1; 14	MAG; 2; 12	VAL; 1 Ret	**VAL**; **2**; 4	2nd	96
2026	GetSpeed Team Bartone Bros	Mercedes-AMG GT3 Evo	Silver	BRH; 1; 17	BRH; 2; 29	MIS; 1; 19	**MIS**; **2**; 13	MAG; 1; 25	MAG; 2; 20	ZAN; 1; 36	ZAN; 2; 26	CAT; 1; 34	CAT; 2; 22	5th	62

Sporting positions
Preceded by Christophe Ferrier	Andros Trophy Électrique; Champion; 2017-18	Succeeded by Christophe Ferrier
Preceded by Jean-Baptiste Dubourg	Andros Trophy; Elite Pro Champion; 2019-20	Succeeded by Jean-Baptiste Dubourg
Preceded by Jean-Baptiste Dubourg	Andros Trophy; Elite Pro Champion; 2022-23	Succeeded by Incumbent
