= Andros Trophy =

French national ice racing championship

- Category: Ice racing
- Country: France
- Inaugural season: 1990
- Official website: www.tropheeandros.com

The Andros Trophy (Trophée Andros) was the French national ice racing championship. The championship held its 35th and last season in 2023–24.

== History ==
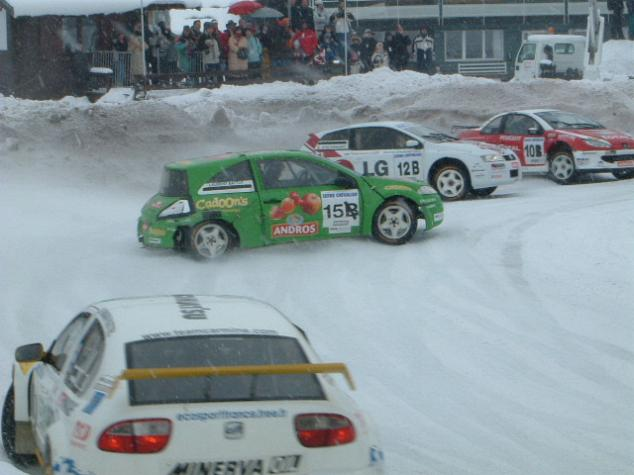
The 2010 Trophée Andros at Serre Chevalier

The idea of an ice racing series first became an idea when professional racer Max Mamers (French Rallycross Champion 1982 and 1983 with Talbot Matra Murena) and the owner of the Andros company (jam and compote producers), Frédéric Gervoson, met as rugby fans in 1985. They spent the winter racing with friends on ice circuits.

On 27 January 1990, the idea of a series came to life at Serre Chevalier with the first round of four. The series quickly grew, with a round at Paris (Pelouse de Reuilly) in 1991 creating a five round series; and a seven round championship in 1992.

In 2003, the trophy gained an international aspect with a race at Sherbrooke in Canada, a race that was held for three seasons. For the 2005–06 season, the trophy remained mainly national, the exception being one round held in Andorra. The championship made a switch to full electric cars for the 2019–20 season. The 2023–24 season will be the last, in part due to global warming making it harder and harder to find predictable ice and snow in France.

== Series ==
2010 Toyota Auris Andros Trophy

The series used to run with a number of different races and classes.

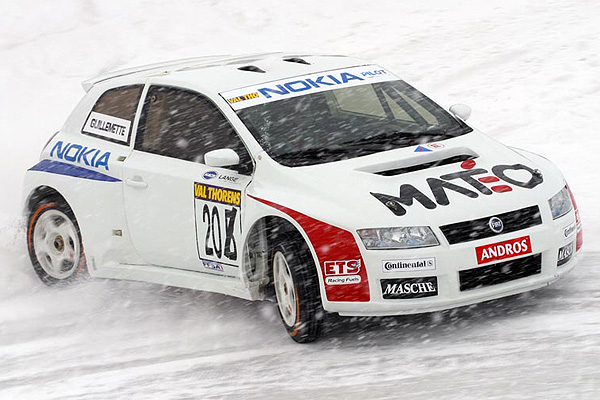
A Fiat Stilo (all-wheel drive prototype) racing in the French Trophée Andros 2005/2006

=== Elite Pro Class ===
This is the original and highest class, featuring the most prominent names.

=== Elite Class ===
Starting in 1994 (named Promotion), this class is for the smaller teams, encouraging them to take part in the Trophée Andros. To partake in this class, there are three conditions: the drivers cannot have finished in the top 20 over the general classification; must never have participated in the Elite Pro Class; and cannot be a professional driver.

=== AMV Cup ===
The motorbike races for the Andros Trophy first appeared at the 1996 championship final at Super Besse, after an idea of Mamers and Claude Michy. It became a series in its own right in the 1997/98 season with a race at every round from that point.

=== Trophée Andros Féminin – Sprint Cars ===
Created in 2002, this series combined two categories. The 600cc 6-speed buggy-styled car was shared between a female driver and an experienced driver, who also was the instructor for the female driver. They competed in two different races at each weekend they attended. The Féminin trophy was discontinued as of 2011, with some of the female drivers from the series moving into other categories of the trophée including the main series and the electric cars.

== Famous names ==
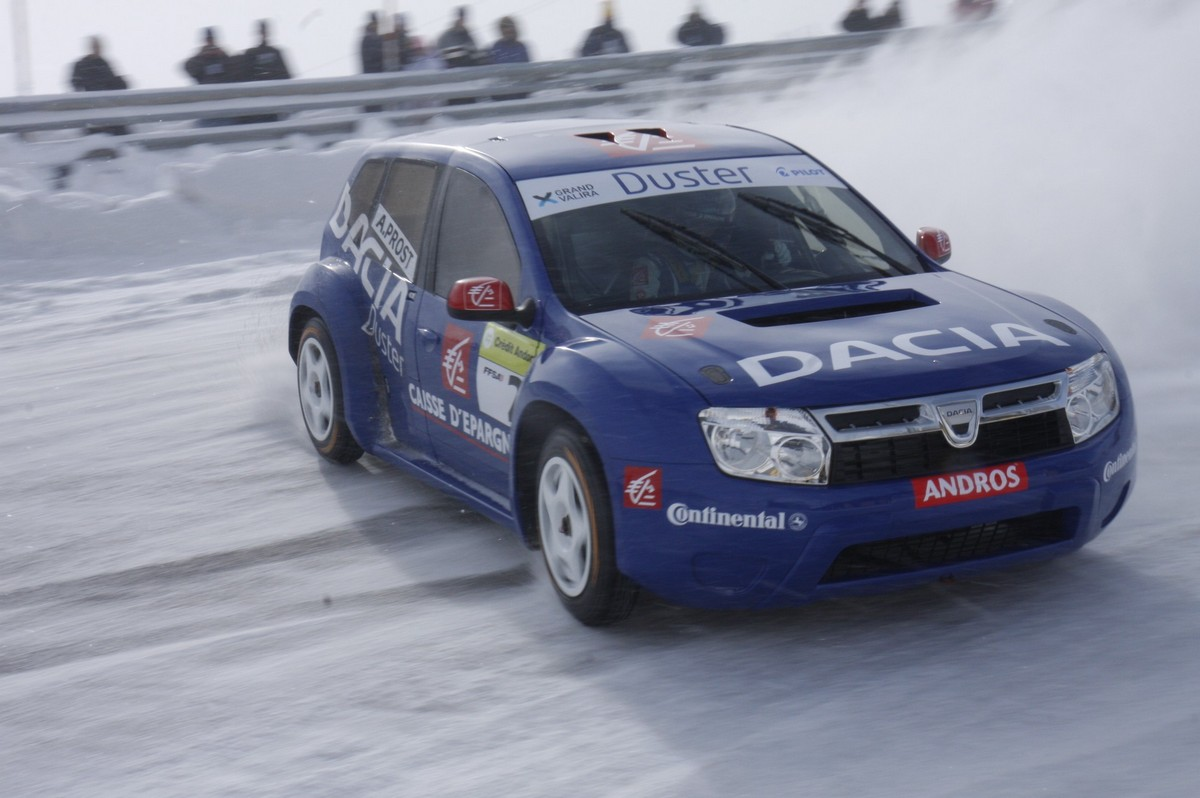
Three-time champion Alain Prost in 2010

The driver with the most championship wins in the history of the series is Yvan Muller, who has won the championship 10 times with 48 race victories. Jean-Philippe Dayraut holds the record for the most race victories with 54, having taken the championship 6 times. Another multiple championship winner is Alain Prost, with 3 championships and 38 race wins. The series always attracts names who were famous in other series before moving to ice racing – including Formula One drivers Olivier Panis, Romain Grosjean and Jacques Villeneuve.

== Superfinal ==
On 14 February 1999, the series held a Superfinal at the Stade de France in Saint-Denis, on the outskirts of Paris. Using 700 tonnes of ice, an oval track was established around the edge of the stadium, allowing for racing in front of around 60,000 people, with no championship points at stake. The Superfinal was held at the Stade de France for three years, before moving to an oval track at Nœux-les-Mines in 2002. No Superfinal was held in 2003, but returned to the Stade de France in 2004. In 2005, the races were held at Saint-Dié-des-Vosges, and once again at the Stade de France in 2006, 2008 and 2011. Various other locations have been used, but in recent years the Superfinal was almost always raced at Clermont / Super Besse.

== Trophy winners ==
Season	Rounds	Elite (1990–2015) Elite Pro (2015–2024)		Elite (2015–2024) Elite 2 (2014–2015) Promotion (1990–2014)	Pilot Bike (1998–15) AMV Cup (2015–2024)	Féminin and Best Dame	Sprint Car	Andros Électrique
Season	Rounds	Driver	Car	Elite (2015–2024) Elite 2 (2014–2015) Promotion (1990–2014)	Pilot Bike (1998–15) AMV Cup (2015–2024)	Féminin and Best Dame	Sprint Car	Andros Électrique
2023–24	5	(France) Aurélien Panis	Audi A1	(France) Louis Gervoson	(France) Vivien Gonnet	-	-	-
2022–23	5	(France) Aurélien Panis	Audi A1	(France) Julien Febrau	(France) Vivien Gonnet	-	-	-
2021–22	5	(France) Jean-Baptiste Dubourg	Renault Zoe	(France) Jimmy Clairet	(France) Vivien Gonnet	-	-	-
2020–21	5	(France) Jean-Baptiste Dubourg	Renault Zoe	(France) Sylvain Pussier	(France) Vivien Gonnet	(France) Clémentine Lhoste (Elite Dame)	-	-
2019–20	6	(France) Aurélien Panis	Audi A1	(France) Jérémy Sarhy	(France) Sylvain Dabert	(France) Clémentine Lhoste (Elite Dame)	-	-
2018–19	7	(France) Jean-Baptiste Dubourg	Renault Captur	(France) Dorian Boccolacci	(France) Maxime Emery	(France) Margot Laffite (Elite Dame)	-	(France) Christophe Ferrier
2017–18	7	(France) Jean-Baptiste Dubourg	Renault Captur	(France) Eddy Bénézet	(France) Sylvain Dabert	(France) Margot Laffite (Elite Dame)	-	(France) Aurélien Panis
2016–17	7	(France) Jean-Baptiste Dubourg	Renault Clio	(France) Nathanaël Berthon	(France) Sylvain Dabert	(France) Margot Laffite (Elite Dame)	-	(France) Christophe Ferrier
2015–16	7	(France) Jean-Baptiste Dubourg	Renault Clio	(France) Eddy Bénézet	(France) Sylvain Dabert	(France) Clémentine Lhoste (Féminin Sprint Car)	-	(France) Matthieu Vaxivière
2014–15	7	(France) Jean-Philippe Dayraut	Mazda 3	Lionel Daziono	(France) Sylvain Dabert	(France) Marine Mercier (Féminin Sprint Car)	-	(France) Nathanaël Berthon
2013–14	7	(France) Jean-Philippe Dayraut	Mini Countryman	Jacques Wolff	(France) Sylvain Dabert	Bérénice Demoustier (Dame)	-	(France) Christophe Ferrier
2012–13	7	(France) Jean-Philippe Dayraut	Mini Countryman	Laurent Barbieri	(France) Maxime Emery	(France) Anne-Sophie Lemonnier (Dame)	-	(France) Christophe Ferrier
2011–12	7	(France) Alain Prost	Dacia Lodgy Glace	(France) Nicolas Bernardi	(France) Sylvain Dabert	(France) Marlène Broggi (Dame)	-	(France) Christophe Ferrier
2010–11	7	(France) Jean-Philippe Dayraut	BMW 1 Series	Andréa Dubourg	(France) Sylvain Dabert	Bérénice Demoustier (Dame)	(France) Frédéric Bourlange	(France) Nicolas Prost
2009–10	7	(France) Jean-Philippe Dayraut	Škoda Fabia Mk2	(France) Lionel Régal	(France) Sylvain Dabert	(France) Anne-Sophie Lemonnier (Dame)	(France) Laurent Macouin	(France) Nicolas Prost
2008–09	7	(France) Jean-Philippe Dayraut	Škoda Fabia Mk2	Eddy Bemezet	(France) Eddy Richer	(France) Aurélia Marti (Dame) (France) Marie-Pierre Cripia (Féminin)	(France) Olivier Dexant	-
2007–08	8	(France) Alain Prost	Toyota Auris	(France) Olivier Pernaut	(France) Maxime Emery	(France) Aurélia Marti (Dame) (France) Anne-Sophie Lemonnier (Féminin)	(France) Olivier Dexant	-
2006–07	9	(France) Alain Prost	Toyota Auris	(France) Jean-Baptiste Dubourg	(France) Maxime Emery	(France) Aurélia Marti (Dame) (France) Audrey Roche (Féminin)	(France) Olivier Dexant	-
2005–06	8	(France) Yvan Muller	Kia Rio	Jérôme Grosset-Janin	(France) Maxime Emery	(France) Margot Laffite (Dame) (France) Marlène Broggi (Féminin)	(France) Olivier Dexant	-
2004–05	8	(France) Yvan Muller	Kia Rio	Yvan Lebon	(France) David Baffeleuf	(France) Justine Chicherit (Dame) (France) Margot Laffite (Féminin)	(France) Olivier Dexant	-
2003–04	8	(France) Yvan Muller	Kia Rio	Steve Stievenart	(France) David Baffeleuf	(France) Aurélia Marti (Féminin)	Benjamin Riviere	-
2002–03	8	(France) Marcel Tarrès	Citroën Xsara	Evens Stievenart	(France) David Baffeleuf	Emilie Petit (Féminin)	David Beziade	-
2001–02	8	(France) Yvan Muller	Opel Astra	Jean-Luc Richner	(France) David Baffeleuf	Véronique Patier (Féminin)	David Beziade	-
2000–01	8	(France) Yvan Muller	Opel Astra	Laurent Fouquet	(France) David Baffeleuf	Patricia Bertapelle (Dame)	-	-
1999–2000	8	(France) Yvan Muller	Opel Astra	Jean-Noël Lanctuit	(France) Pascal Roblin	Patricia Bertapelle (Dame)	-	-
1998–99	8	(France) Yvan Muller	Opel Tigra	Philippe de Korsak	(France) David Baffeleuf	Patricia Bertapelle (Dame)	-	-
1997–98	7	(France) Yvan Muller	Opel Tigra	Claude Millet	(France) David Baffeleuf	Jutta Kleinschmidt (Dame)	-	-
1996–97	7	(France) Yvan Muller	BMW 318i Compact	Frédéric Morel	-	Florence Duez (Dame)	-	-
1995–96	7	(France) Yvan Muller	BMW 318i Compact	James Ruffier	-	Caroline Barclay (Dame)	-	-
1994–95	7	(France) François Chatriot	Opel Astra	James Ruffier	-	Michèle Mouton (Dame)	-	-
1993–94	7	(France) François Chauche	Mega	(France) Eric Arpin	-	Patricia Bertapelle (Dame)	-	-
1992–93	5	(France) Dany Snobeck	Mercedes 190 16S	-	-	-	-	-
1991–92	7	(France) Dany Snobeck	Mercedes 190 16S	-	-	-	-	-
1990-91	5	(France) Maurice Chomat	Citroën AX Sport	-	-	-	-	-
1990	4	(France) Eric Arpin	Peugeot 205 Turbo 16	-	-	-	-	-

The title for the dame was awarded in to best women in a selected class in each season.

== See also ==
- Andros Sport 01
- Sno*Drift
- Jänner Rallye
