= Evens Stievenart =

French racing driver

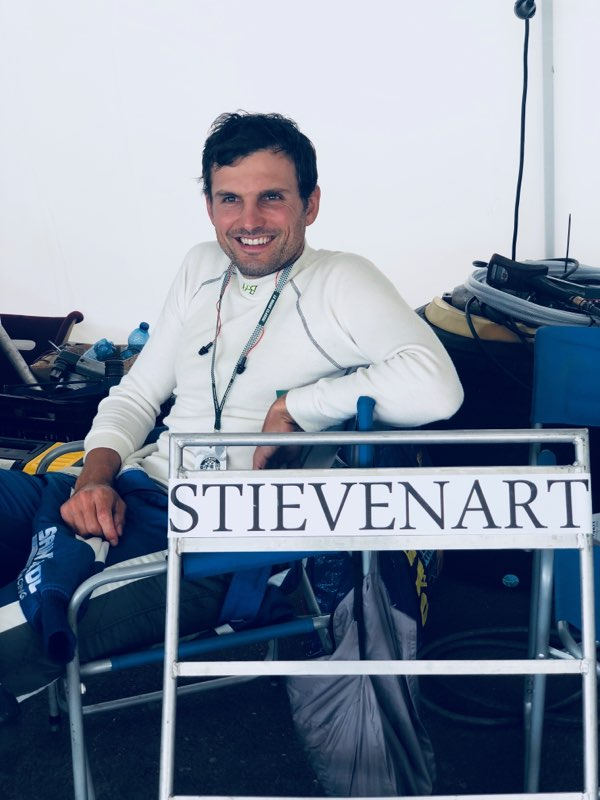

Personal information
- Nationality: French
- Born: 21 January 1983 (age 43) Abbeville, France
- Years active: 1999-Present

Sport
- Sport: Mountain bike racing Ultra-distance cycling Racing driver
- Event(s): Andros Trophy; Porsche Carrera Cup; FIA European Rallycross Championship; Cape Epic; 24 heures du Mans vélo

Evens Corneil Norbert Stievenart (born 21 January 1983) is a French long-distance cyclist and racing driver, with significant experience in ice racing on the Andros Trophy Series. Sports enthusiast, he has recorded 3 victories at the 24 Hours of Le Mans; 2 on its solo cycling version in 2016 and 2017 and one on its Classic car version in 2018.

He is the brother of the long-distance swimmer Stève Stievenart.

== Car racing ==
The Trophée Andros is where Evens initially made his mark. In 2003, he won the Promotion Class with a Nissan Micra.

The highlights of his career are 2 victories in the SuperFinals in 2004 and in 2012 at the Stade de France with the Kia official Racing team and the Dacia official racing team. He has also won 3 stage races and has finished on the podium on several occasions.

In 2018, he also participated for the first time in the Le Mans Classic Edition and won the race behind the wheel of a 908 LH Porsche.

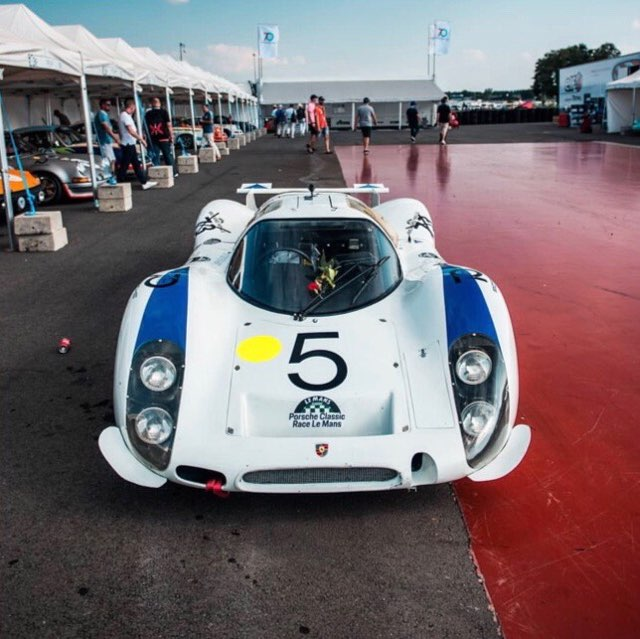
Evens drove the Porsche 908 to victory at Le Mans Classic 2018

His most notable teammates were the 4 time World Touring Car Cup World Champion Yvan Muller in 2004, 2005 and 2006 and the 4 time Formula One World Champion Alain Prost in 2011 and 2012.

== Cycling ==
Still eager to push his limits, Evens has participated in many cycling races.

In 2012 he started to be involved in Ultra-distance cycling and took part in the Cape Epic raid 2012 in South Africa and completed the 8 day race.

In 2016, on his first attempt, he won the 24 heures du Mans Vélo in the Solo category, riding for 530 miles (853 km).

One year later, in August 2017, he won for the second time in a row. He shattered his own mark by setting a new record of 593 miles (950 km), the longest distance ever ridden in 24 hours on a bike, making him the unofficial world record holder.

Evens has won over 60 Road and Time Trial races in Category 1 of the UFOLEP Federation. Among those victories, he won the French Time Trial title in 2010 and added back to back victories in one of UFOLEP's biggest stage race, Les Routes de l’Oise in 2016 and 2017.

In 2019, Evens and fellow countryman Jean-Luc Perez won the Race Across America in the 2-person category, setting a new record for the fastest average speed. They completed the 3082 miles (4960 km) in a total time of 6 days, 10 hours and 39 minutes at an average speed of 19.85 mph (31.95kmh)

== Business ==
In 1999, Evens Stievenart started his professional career in the Familial Group of Magazine. He started to work as a photographer and later became chief editor.

In 2007, he was the Founder of Stadium Automobile Abbeville racing school, one of the most important racing schools in the north of France.

In 2010, Evens created the Karting stadium company, also based on the Abbeville racetrack site.

In 2011, he created Easydrift France, a company that imports the patented high-density ring technology that gives trainers the ability to teach “hands-on” skid recovery and advanced driving skills at low speed.

His skills on the racetrack, especially on slippery surface, allowed him to quickly develop the concept in France for road safety purposes and leisure activities.

Since 2013, Evens has been based in Los Angeles and works as a General Manager for the Exotics Racing California branch, located at the Auto Club Speedway.

== Cycling record ==
- 2012 – Cape Epic
- 2016 – 24 hours of Le Mans Cycling - Solo Category - Winner
- 2016 – Routes de l’Oise – Winner
- 2017 – 24 hours of Le Mans Cycling - Solo Category - Winner
- 2017 – Routes de l’Oise – Winner
- 2019 – Race Across America - 2 men Category - Winner

== Car Racing record ==
- 2000 – Rallye Cross Championship Formule France - 5th overall
- 2000 – FIA European Rallycross Championship - Citroen Saxo
- 2002 – Andros Trophy - Promotion category
- 2003 – Andros Trophy - Promotion category - Class winner
- 2003 – Porsche Carrera Cup Championship
- 2004 – Andros Trophy - Kia with Yvan Muller - 4th overall (2 victories, including the Super Finale in the Stade de France)
- 2005 – Andros Trophy - Kia with Yvan Muller - 6th overall
- 2005 – North American Ice Championship - Sherbrooke Canada - Winner
- 2006 – Andros Trophy - Kia with Yvan Muller - 5th overall
- 2008 – Andros Trophy - Kia - 2 podiums
- 2011 – Andros Trophy - Skoda with Olivier Panis and Jacques Villeneuve as teammates - Winner at Lans-en-Vercors
- 2012 – Andros Trophy - Dacia team with Alain Prost as teammate in the Dacia Lodgy.
- 2017 – Andros Trophy - Mazda - Winner at Andorra
- 2018 – Le Mans Classic - Porsche 908 - as Invited class
