= Ayvens =

French fleet managing and operational car leasing company

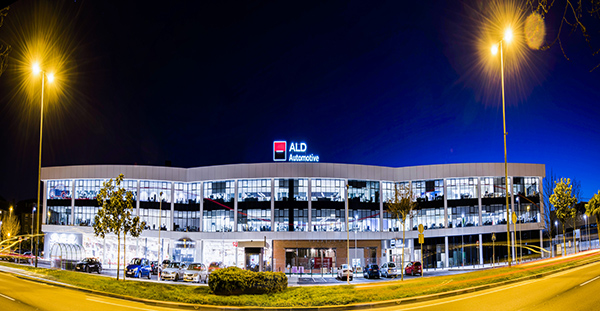
- ALD Automotive Spanish Headquarters
- Traded as: Euronext Paris: AYV; CAC Mid 60 Component
- ISIN: FR0013258662
- Industry: fleet management, leasing
- Headquarters: Rueil-Malmaison, France
- Area served: Worldwide
- Key people: Tim Albertsen (CEO)
- Owner: Société Générale
- Number of employees: 14,500 (2023)
- Website: www.ayvens.com

Ayvens, formerly ALD Automotive, is a French fleet managing and operational car leasing company and a majority owned subsidiary of Société Générale. The company is active internationally and manages around 3.42 million vehicles. With a direct presence in 42 countries and with top 3 positions in 26 countries, ALD Automotive is ranked #3 worldwide and #1 in Europe by number of contracts under management and excluding OEM captives as at 31 December 2017 with around 1.5 million full service vehicle leasing and fleet management service contracts.

The company also sells former lease fleet vehicles to consumers through its ALD Carmarket brand.

In 2015 ALD Automotive started leasing out e-bikes in the Netherlands, as part of a program on experimenting with innovative mobility on the Dutch market.

On 16 June 2017 the company was listed on the Paris Euronext stock market.

On 6 January 2022 the company announced its intention to acquire its Dutch-headquartered competitor LeasePlan for 4.9 billion euros. The operation is expected to close in the second quarter of 2023 and would see the shareholding of Société Générale decrease to 53% of the combined entity down from 79.8% as at 10-07-2017.

In October 2023 the company changed name to Ayvens.

Locations where ALD Automotive is present

== Acquisitions ==
- Bright Lease
- Munsterhuis Lease
- Carfree
- MKB-Euroleasing Autopark
- SternLease
