= STEF =

French logistics company

Coordinates: 44.7880°N 10.3858°E

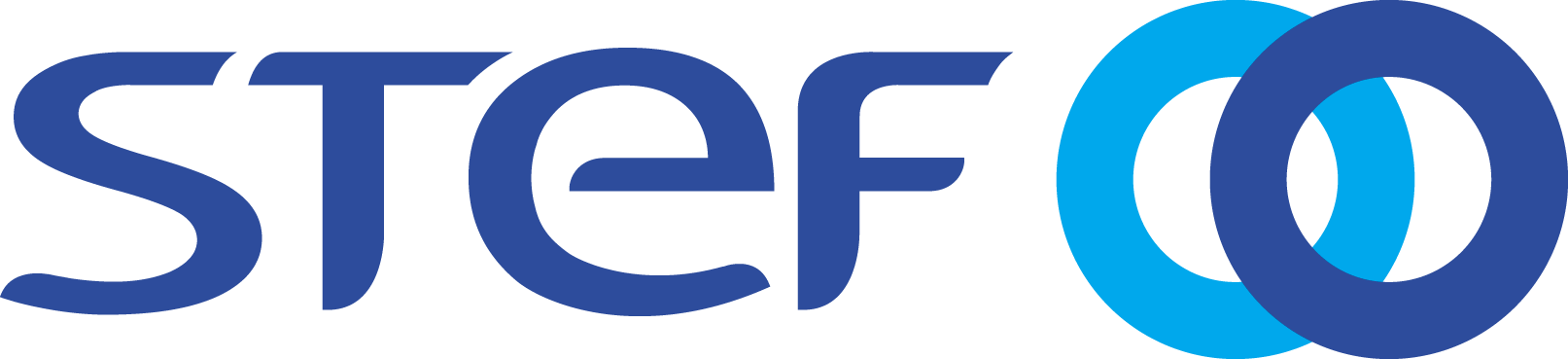
- Type: Société anonyme
- Traded as: Euronext Paris: STF; CAC All-Share
- Industry: Temperature controlled Transport and Logistics
- Founded: 1920
- Headquarters: Paris, France
- Key people: Stanislas Lemor (Chairman and CEO), Marc Vettard (Deputy CEO in charge of Operations), Francis Lemor (Honorary president)
- Net income: ▲€3,255 billion (2018)
- Owner: Management 53%, Employees 16.5%, Others 23.7%, STEF 6.8%
- Number of employees: ▲18,000 (2018)
- Website: www.stef.fr/en

STEF (formerly STEF-TFE) is a European specialist in cold logistics for temperature-sensitive and agro-food products.

STEF is active in 7 European countries: Belgium, Spain, France, Italy, the Netherlands, Portugal and Switzerland. The group employs 18,000 staff members and operates with specialised assets: 236 platforms and warehouses, 1,900 vehicles and 1,950 refrigerated trailers.

STEF's annual turnover for 2018 was €3,255 million.

Its main clients are the food industry, the retail industry and food service.

== Services ==
- STEF Transport (formerly TFE) is a dedicated network for ambient, chilled and frozen products' transportation.
- STEF Logistique (formerly STEF) provides logistics services for ambient, fresh and frozen products.
- STEF Seafood (formerly Tradimar) is a dedicated network for the transportation and logistics services of fresh and frozen seafood products.
- STEF Iberia (formerly S.D.F) manages chilled and frozen products throughout the Iberia peninsula.
- STEF Italia (formerly CAVALIERI TRASPORTI S.P.A., TFE DA and Dispensa Logistics) has 30 sites in Italy and provides transportation and logistics services for temperature-controlled products.
- STEF Benelux provides transportation and logistics services to clients in Belgium, Luxembourg and the Netherlands.
- STEF Information et Technologies (formerly AGROSTAR) is the group's IT subsidiary, as well as a software editor for the food supply chain sector.
- SPEKSNIJDER TRANSPORT supports STEF Benelux in serving Benelux clients.
