= Lans-en-Vercors =

- Commune
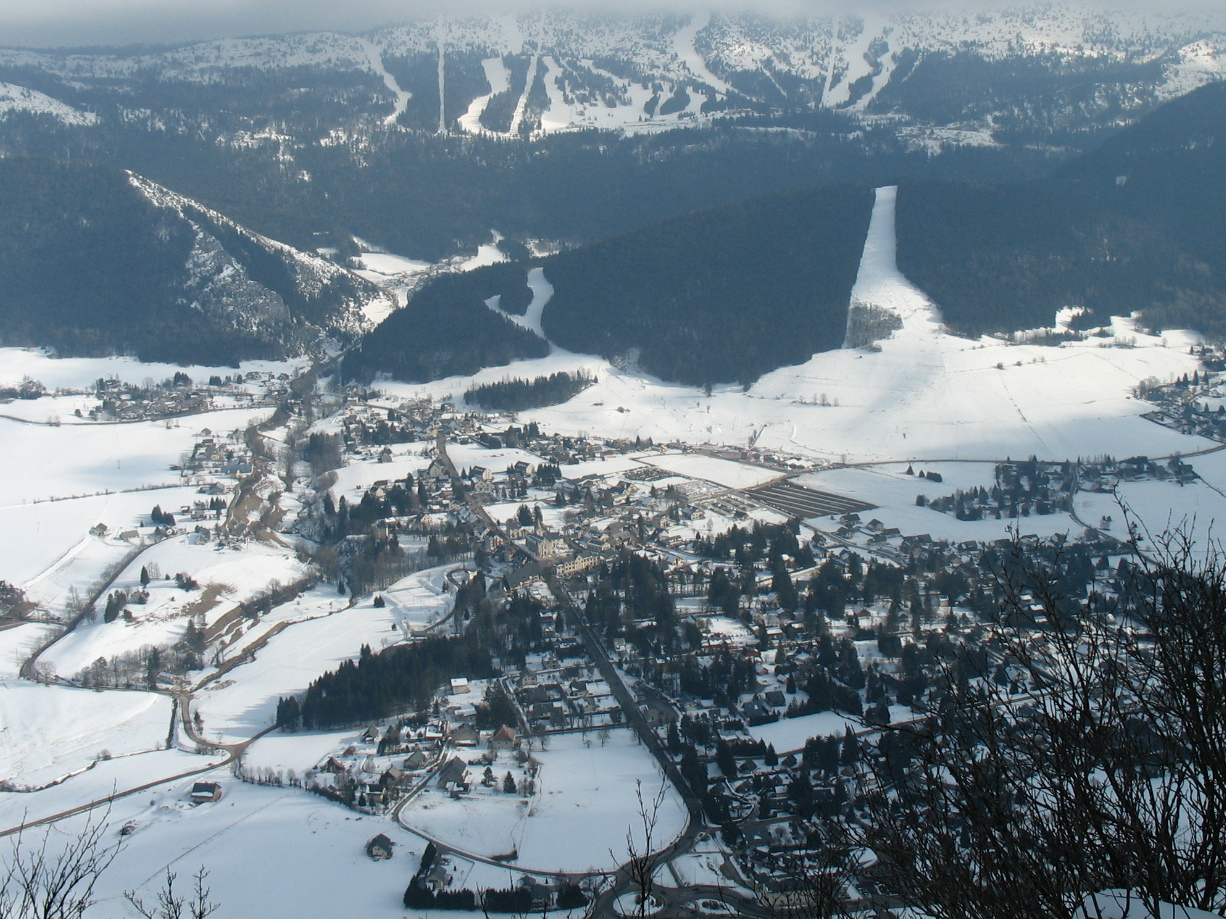
- A general view of Lans-en-Vercors
- Location of Lans-en-Vercors
- Location within France Location within Auvergne-Rhône-Alpes
- Coordinates: 45°07′45″N 5°35′21″E
- Country: France
- Region: Auvergne-Rhône-Alpes
- Department: Isère
- Arrondissement: Grenoble
- Canton: Fontaine-Vercors
- Intercommunality: Massif du Vercors

Government
  - Mayor (2020–2026): Michaël Kraemer
- Area^{1}: 39 km^{2} (15 sq mi)
- Highest elevation: 1,960 m (6,430 ft)
- Lowest elevation: 902 m (2,959 ft)
- Population (2023): 2,751
  - Density: 71/km^{2} (180/sq mi)
- Time zone: UTC+01:00 (CET)
  - Summer (DST): UTC+02:00 (CEST)
- INSEE/Postal code: 38205 /38250
- ^{1} French Land Register data, which excludes lakes, ponds, glaciers > 1 km^{2} (0.386 sq mi or 247 acres) and river estuaries.

Lans-en-Vercors (French pronunciation: [lɑ̃s ɑ̃ vɛʁkɔʁ], literally Lans in Vercors) is a commune in the Isère department in southeastern France.

== Population ==
Historical population

Year	Pop.	±% p.a.
1793	980	—
1800	898	−1.24%
1806	1,060	+2.80%
1821	1,013	−0.30%
1831	1,076	+0.61%
1836	1,155	+1.43%
1841	1,180	+0.43%
1846	1,265	+1.40%
1851	1,170	−1.55%
1856	1,174	+0.07%
1861	1,169	−0.09%
1866	1,120	−0.85%
1872	1,102	−0.27%
1876	1,051	−1.18%
1881	1,032	−0.36%
1886	1,014	−0.35%
1891	978	−0.72%
1896	961	−0.35%
1901	888	−1.57%

Year	Pop.	±% p.a.
1906	893	+0.11%
1911	846	−1.08%
1921	726	−1.52%
1926	717	−0.25%
1931	721	+0.11%
1936	738	+0.47%
1946	923	+2.26%
1954	867	−0.78%
1962	693	−2.76%
1968	795	+2.31%
1975	859	+1.11%
1982	1,098	+3.57%
1990	1,451	+3.55%
1999	2,026	+3.78%
2007	2,384	+2.05%
2012	2,574	+1.55%
2017	2,651	+0.59%
2023	2,751	+0.62%

Source: EHESS and INSEE (1968-2023)

== Twin towns ==
Lans-en-Vercors is twinned with:

- Saint-Donat, Lanaudière, Quebec, Canada, since 1990

== See also ==
- Communes of the Isère department
- Parc naturel régional du Vercors
