= Super Besse =

French winter sports resort in the Massif Central

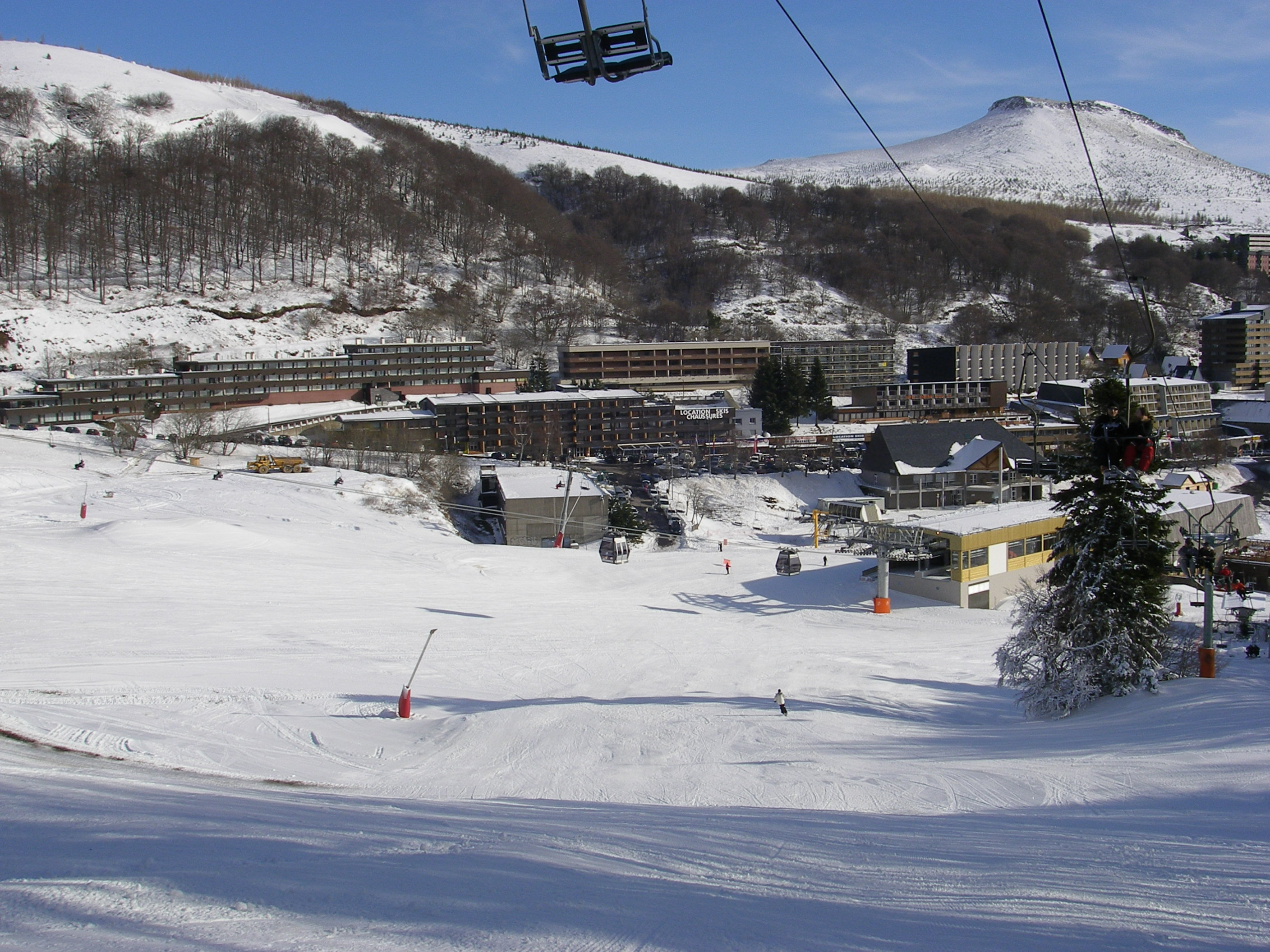
- The station and the foot of the ski slopes

- Location within France
- Location: Besse-et-Saint-Anastaise
- Nearest city: Clermont-Ferrand
- Coordinates: 45°30′38.52″N 2°51′24.30″E
- Top elevation: 1,800 m (5,900 ft)
- Base elevation: 1,350 m (4,430 ft)
- Trails: 27
- Total length: 43 km (27 mi)
- Lift system: 23
- Lift capacity: 24,000 people/hour
- Website: www.sancy.com

Super Besse is a winter sports resort located in Massif Central, France.

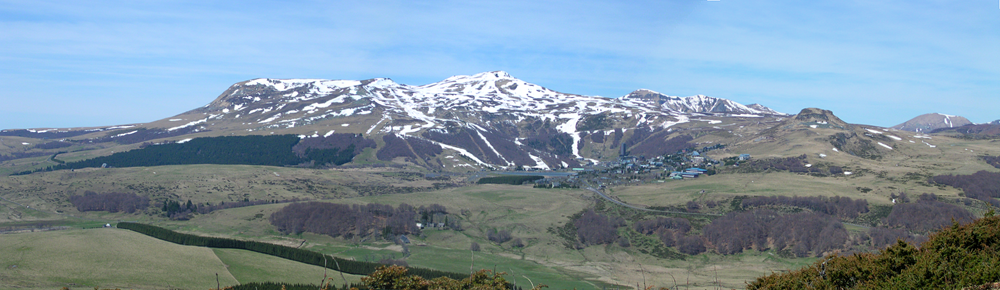
Puy de Sancy from the south

== Geography ==
Super Besse located in the commune of Besse-et-Saint-Anastaise (Parc naturel régional des volcans d'Auvergne in the department of Puy-de-Dôme, Auvergne). Situated approximately 50 km (31 mi) from Clermont-Ferrand, it is located at an altitude of 1,350 m (4,430 ft) on the slopes of Puy de Sancy, Puy de la Perdrix and Puy Ferrand.

=== Climate ===
Climate data for Superbesse, 1,287 m (4,222 ft) (1981−2010 normals, 1976−2022 extremes)
Month	Jan	Feb	Mar	Apr	May	Jun	Jul	Aug	Sep	Oct	Nov	Dec	Year
Record high °C (°F)	17.0 (62.6)	19.1 (66.4)	19.3 (66.7)	20.9 (69.6)	25.7 (78.3)	33.7 (92.7)	32.0 (89.6)	30.6 (87.1)	27.0 (80.6)	23.6 (74.5)	20.6 (69.1)	17.4 (63.3)	33.7 (92.7)
Mean daily maximum °C (°F)	2.8 (37.0)	3.0 (37.4)	5.2 (41.4)	7.6 (45.7)	12.1 (53.8)	15.8 (60.4)	18.7 (65.7)	18.3 (64.9)	14.8 (58.6)	11.3 (52.3)	5.9 (42.6)	3.8 (38.8)	9.9 (49.9)
Daily mean °C (°F)	−0.1 (31.8)	−0.1 (31.8)	1.9 (35.4)	4.1 (39.4)	8.3 (46.9)	11.8 (53.2)	14.4 (57.9)	14.1 (57.4)	10.9 (51.6)	7.8 (46.0)	3.0 (37.4)	0.9 (33.6)	6.4 (43.5)
Mean daily minimum °C (°F)	−3.1 (26.4)	−3.2 (26.2)	−1.4 (29.5)	0.6 (33.1)	4.6 (40.3)	7.8 (46.0)	10.0 (50.0)	10.0 (50.0)	7.1 (44.8)	4.4 (39.9)	0.0 (32.0)	−1.9 (28.6)	2.9 (37.2)
Record low °C (°F)	−22.0 (−7.6)	−20.5 (−4.9)	−15.0 (5.0)	−10.5 (13.1)	−7.0 (19.4)	−1.0 (30.2)	2.0 (35.6)	0.5 (32.9)	−2.5 (27.5)	−7.0 (19.4)	−14.0 (6.8)	−16.6 (2.1)	−22.0 (−7.6)
Average precipitation mm (inches)	202.7 (7.98)	197.5 (7.78)	178.6 (7.03)	166.7 (6.56)	164.2 (6.46)	152.0 (5.98)	130.6 (5.14)	124.2 (4.89)	159.4 (6.28)	206.4 (8.13)	219.6 (8.65)	221.7 (8.73)	2,123.6 (83.61)
Source: Meteociel

== History ==
Super Besse was opened on 21 December 1961, under the impetus of mayor Alfred Pipet. The idea for the ski resort came from Germain Gauthier, a cross-country skiing champion from Picherande.

== Facilities ==
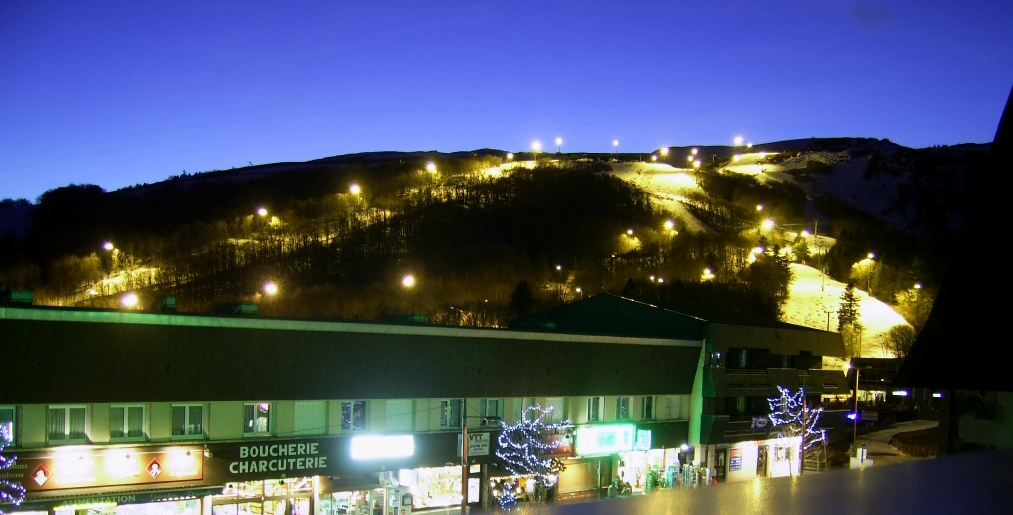
Super Besse in the evening

The on piste skiing consists of 43 km (27 mi) distributed on 27 tracks (5 green, 9 blue, 9 red and 4 black) between 1,300 and 1,840 m (4,270 and 6,040 ft) altitude, on the south-eastern slope of Puy de Sancy. It contains 21 ski lifts. It also includes 125 km (78 mi) of cross-country skiing.

The resort includes:

- 1 funitel with 20 places (new in 2008)
- 4 chair-lifts
- 16 ski-lifts.

=== Other facilities ===
In July 2013, Super Besse opened the Fantasticable, a 1.6-kilometre-long (0.99 mi) zip line. By 2015, this attraction had been used by 30,000 people. The construction of a new 2.6-kilometre-long (1.6 mi) adventure course began in April 2018. Named the X'Trem Aventure de la Biche, it was scheduled to open for the Christmas holidays in 2018 and cost €350,000 to build. The course includes twenty zip lines along its length, as well as tunnels, jumps, suspension bridges and via ferrata. The diversification of facilities is intended to attract more summer visitors.

== Andros Trophy ==
Since 1994 and excepting 2021, Super Besse has hosted an annual race within the Andros Trophy championship, an international ice racing challenge run on frozen tracks.

== Tour de France ==
Super Besse hosted the first mountain finish of the 2008 Tour de France. The finish was at an altitude of 1,289 m (4,229 ft), whereas in previous years the finish was at 1,350 m (4,430 ft).

=== Tour de France stage finishes ===
Year	Stage	Start of stage	Distance	Category of climb	Stage winner	Yellow jersey	Ref
2011	8	Aigurande	189 km (117 mi)	3	Rui Costa (POR)	Thor Hushovd (NOR)	
2008	6	Aigurande	195.5 km (121.5 mi)	2	Alejandro Valverde (ESP)	Kim Kirchen (LUX)	(Note: Alejandro Valverde is listed as the winner for the 2008 stage. Riccardo Riccò initially won the stage, but was removed from the classification after testing positive for the banned performance enhancer CERA.)
1996	13	Le Puy-en-Velay	177 km (110 mi)	3	Rolf Sørensen (DEN)	Bjarne Riis (DEN)	
1978	13	Figeac	221.5 km (137.6 mi)	3	Paul Wellens (BEL)	Joseph Bruyère (BEL)	

=== Details of climb ===
Starting from Besse-et-Saint-Anastaise (1,040 m (3,410 ft)), the climb to Super Besse (1,325 m (4,347 ft)) is 7.2 km (4.5 mi) long. Over this distance, the climb is 285 m (935 ft) (an average of 3.95%). The maximum gradient is 8.4%.

From the valley at Lomprat the total climb is 11 km (6.8 mi) at 4.7%.
