= 2018–19 Andros Trophy =

The 2018–19 Andros Trophy was the twenty-ninth season of the Andros Trophy, a motor racing championship for automobile ice racing and motorcycle ice racing held in France and Andorra. The season began in Val Thorens on 8 December 2018 and finished on 9 February 2019 in the Stade de France stadium. Jean-Baptiste Dubourg was the defending Elite Pro Drivers' champion.

== Teams and drivers ==
=== Elite Pro and Elite ===
Entries excluding non-championship round at Stade de France
Team	Car	No.	Elite Pro Drivers	Rounds	Elite Drivers	Rounds
(France) DA Racing	Renault Captur	1	(France) Jean-Baptiste Dubourg	All	—N/a	
(France) DA Racing	Renault Captur	9	(France) Ludovic Gherardi	1, 5	(France) Emmanuel Moinel	All
(France) DA Racing	Renault Captur	9	(France) Andréa Dubourg	3–4	(France) Emmanuel Moinel	All
(France) DA Racing	Renault Captur	9	(France) Thierry Joncoux	6	(France) Emmanuel Moinel	All
(France) Pussier Automobiles by Clairet Sport	Peugeot 3008	2	(France) Benjamin Rivière	All	(France) Sylvain Pussier	All
(France) Pussier Automobiles by Clairet Sport	Peugeot 3008	10	(France) Aurélien Comte	1–4	(France) Stéphane Ventaja	All
(France) Pussier Automobiles by Clairet Sport	Peugeot 3008	10	(France) Teddy Clairet	5	(France) Stéphane Ventaja	All
(France) Pussier Automobiles by Clairet Sport	Peugeot 3008	10	(France) Jimmy Clairet	6	(France) Stéphane Ventaja	All
(Belgium) Comtoyou Racing	Audi A1 Quattro	3	(France) Nathanaël Berthon	All	(France) Louis Gervoson	All
(Belgium) Comtoyou Racing	Audi A1 Quattro	8	(France) Olivier Panis	1, 3–6	(France) Lionel Daziano	All
(Belgium) Comtoyou Racing	Audi A1 Quattro	8	(France) Bertrand Balas	2	(France) Lionel Daziano	All
(France) Saintéloc Racing	Mazda 3	4	(France) Olivier Pernaut	All	(France) Margot Laffite	All
(France) Saintéloc Racing	Mazda 3	5	(France) Didier Thoral	All	(France) Philippe Bansard	1–4, 6
(France) Saintéloc Racing	Mazda 3	5	(France) Didier Thoral	All	(France) Thierry Joncoux	5
(France) Saintéloc Racing	Plastic'Up	31	(France) Aurélien Panis	All	—N/a	
(France) CMR	BMW M2	6	(France) Gérald Fontanel	All	(France) Joël Lopez	All
(France) CMR	BMW M2	7	(France) Eddy Bénézet	All	(France) Dorian Boccolacci	All
(France) CMR	Mini Countryman	11	—N/a		Julien France	4
(France) Exagon Engineering	Andros Sport	30	(France) Franck Lagorce	All	—N/a	
(France) Exagon Engineering	Motul	32	(France) Nicolas Prost	1–3	—N/a	
(France) Exagon Engineering	Motul	33	(France) Nicolas Prost	4–6	(Norway) Andreas Bakkerud	5

Stade de France entries
Team	Car	No.	Driver 1	Driver 2
(France) DA Racing	Renault Captur	1	(France) Andréa Dubourg	(France) Jean-Baptiste Dubourg
(France) DA Racing	Renault Captur	9	(France) Emmanuel Moinel	(France) Matthieu Vaxivière
(France) Pussier Automobiles by Clairet Sport	Peugeot 3008	2	(France) Sylvain Pussier	(France) Benjamin Rivière
(France) Pussier Automobiles by Clairet Sport	Peugeot 3008	10	(France) Stéphane Ventaja	(France) Aurélien Comte
(Belgium) Comtoyou Racing	Audi A1 Quattro	3	(France) Nathanaël Berthon	(France) Louis Gervoson
(Belgium) Comtoyou Racing	Audi A1 Quattro	8	(France) Lionel Daziano	(France) Bertrand Balas
(France) Saintéloc Racing	Mazda 3	4	(France) Margot Laffite	(France) Olivier Pernaut
(France) Saintéloc Racing	Mazda 3	5	(France) Philippe Bansard	(France) Didier Thoral
(France) Saintéloc Racing	Plastic'Up	31	(France) Aurélien Panis	(France) Olivier Panis
(France) CMR	BMW M2	6	(France) Gérald Fontanel	(France) Joël Lopez
(France) CMR	BMW M2	7	(France) Eddy Bénézet	(France) Dorian Boccolacci
(France) CMR	Mini Countryman	11	(France) Julien Piguet	(France) Anthony Beltoise
(France) Exagon Engineering	Andros Sport	30	(France) Franck Lagorce	(France) Sébastien Loeb
(France) Exagon Engineering	Motul	33	(France) Nicolas Prost	(Norway) Andreas Bakkerud

Electric-powered cars
Not eligible to contribute to Teams' championship

=== Électrique ===
Every driver participates in an electric Andros Trophy car.

Sponsor	No.	Drivers	Rounds
Loxam	1	(France) Clémentine Lhoste	All
STEF	2	(France) Vincent Beltoise	All
Andros	3	(France) Franck Montagny	1
Andros	3	(France) Julien Fébreau	2
Andros	3	(France) Carine Galli	3
Andros	3	(France) Matthieu Vaxivière	4
Andros	3	(France) Yann Ehrlacher	5
Andros	3	(France) Claudio Capéo	6–7
Enedis	4	(France) Guillaume Pley	1, 4, 7
Enedis	4	(France) Perrine Laffont	2
Enedis	4	(France) Stéphane Plaza	3
Enedis	4	(France) Kévin Brouet	5
Enedis	4	(France) Franck Montagny	6
ALD Automotive	5	(France) Louis Gervoson	All
MNCA	6	(France) Christophe Ferrier	All
Région Sud	7	(France) Cindy Cherchève	4
Trophée Andros	7	(France) Thierry Bridron	5
Trophée Andros	7	(France) Paul Lamouret	6
Motul	7	(France) Thomas Laurent	7
8Js	8	(France) Sacha Prost	All
Dupessey	9	(France) Yann Ehrlacher	7
Petit Forestier	10	(France) Louis Rousset	All
Enedis	11	(France) Tom Villa	1
Enedis	11	(France) Thomas Laurent	2
Enedis	11	(France) Delphine Wespiser	6
SPI Logistic	12	(France) Julien Andlauer	7

=== AMV Cup ===
Team	Bike	No.	Riders	Rounds
(France) RMSCV Villeurbanais	Kawasaki	3	(France) Maxime Lacour	All
(France) J. Rolland Racing	Husqvarna	4	(France) Vivien Gonnet	All
(France) MC Chanos Curson	Husqvarna	6	(France) Noël Duvert	All
(France) Team EMC	Sport Moto 50	11	(France) Maxime Emery	1
(France) Team EMC	Husqvarna	11	(France) Maxime Emery	2–7
(France) Moto Club Rumilly	Yamaha	12	(France) Lucas Dandeville	1
(France) MC Villars-sous-Écot	Honda	14	(France) Germain Vincenot	All
(France) J6 Performance	KTM	16	(France) Johan Wang Chang	All
(France) Invité AMV Cup	Honda	18	(France) Loïc Cartier	1–2, 6–7
(France) Invité AMV Cup	Husqvarna	50	(France) Romain Taurel	1, 3, 5
(France) Invité AMV Cup	Husqvarna	50	(Spain) Alfredo Gomez	2
(France) Invité AMV Cup	Husqvarna	50	(France) Julien Colomban	4
(France) Invité AMV Cup	Suzuki	50	(France) Vincent Philippe	6
(France) Invité AMV Cup	Alta Electrique	50	(France) Jordan Labbé	7
(France) Invité AMV Cup	KTM	51	(France) Jonathan Guenzi	1
(France) Invité AMV Cup	Husqvarna	51	(France) Randy de Puniet	3–4, 6–7
(France) Invité AMV Cup	Kawasaki	52	(France) Jarno Langlois	1, 5
(France) Invité AMV Cup	KTM	52	(France) François Frauziol	2
(France) Invité AMV Cup	Husqvarna	52	(France) Till De Clercq	3
(France) Invité AMV Cup	Husqvarna	52	(France) Mathias Dolci	4
(France) Invité AMV Cup	Sherco	53	(France) Romain Chiabodo	1
(France) Invité AMV Cup	Honda	53	(Andorra) Xavi España Muñoz	2
(France) Invité AMV Cup	Kawasaki	53	(France) Elian Gras	3–6
(France) Invité AMV Cup	Honda	56	(France) David Baffeleuf	4, 6–7
(France) Invité AMV Cup	Honda	56	(France) Melwine Negrillo	5
(France) Invité AMV Cup	Husqvarna	57	(France) Jonathan Guenzi	3
(France) Invité AMV Cup	Yamaha	57	(France) Mickaël Ortega	4
(France) Invité AMV Cup	Husqvarna	57	(France) Maxime Jeoffre	6–7
(France) Invité AMV Cup	Husqvarna	59	(France) Franck Brancy	4
(France) Invité AMV Cup	KTM	59	(France) Jonathan Guenzi	5
(France) Invité AMV Cup	KTM	59	(France) Hugo Panneciere	6
(France) Team Atomic Moto	Husqvarna	23	(France) Elie Vecchi	1–4, 6–7
(France) Moto Club Lozérien	KTM	25	(France) Kévin Maliges	All
(France) Team MR	Yamaha	29	(France) Grégoire Martinez	1
(France) Team MR	KTM	29	(France) Grégoire Martinez	2–7
(France) TVR	Honda	34	(France) Sébastien Valla	All
(France) Team Trebad	KTM	37	(France) Sylvain Dabert	All
(France) Ice Racing Team	Honda	44	(France) Etienne Parseihian	1–2, 4–7
(Belgium) Comtoyou Racing	Honda	63	(France) Romain Gioffre	All
(France) Moto Club des Triéves	Husqvarna	69	(France) Randy Peresson	All
(France) Team VD 76	Honda	76	(France) Vivian Dabert	All

== Calendar and results ==
Rnd.		Circuit	Date	Elite Pro Winners	Elite Winners	Électrique Winners	AMV Cup Winners	
2018
1	R1	(France) Val Thorens, Savoie	8 December	(France) Aurélien Panis	(France) Emmanuel Moinel	(France) Christophe Ferrier	—N/a	
1	R2	(France) Val Thorens, Savoie	9 December	Races cancelled (Note: All racing on Sunday 9 December in Val Thorens was cancelled due to bad weather. A make-up round at Super Besse was scheduled.)				
2	R1	Le Pas de la Case, Andorra	21 December	(France) Franck Lagorce	(France) Louis Gervoson	(France) Christophe Ferrier	(France) Vivien Gonnet	
2	R2	Le Pas de la Case, Andorra	22 December	(France) Jean-Baptiste Dubourg	(France) Dorian Boccolacci	(France) Christophe Ferrier	(France) Vivien Gonnet	
2019
3	R1	(France) Isola 2000, Alpes-Maritimes	11 January	(France) Olivier Panis	(France) Dorian Boccolacci	(France) Christophe Ferrier	(France) Germain Vincenot	
3	R2	(France) Isola 2000, Alpes-Maritimes	12 January	(France) Andréa Dubourg	(France) Dorian Boccolacci	(France) Christophe Ferrier	(France) Germain Vincenot	
4	R1	(France) Serre Chevalier, Hautes-Alpes	19 January	(France) Jean-Baptiste Dubourg	(France) Dorian Boccolacci	(France) Christophe Ferrier	R1	(France) Maxime Emery
4	R1	(France) Serre Chevalier, Hautes-Alpes	19 January	(France) Jean-Baptiste Dubourg	(France) Dorian Boccolacci	(France) Christophe Ferrier	R2	(France) Maxime Emery
4	R2	(France) Serre Chevalier, Hautes-Alpes	20 January	(France) Franck Lagorce	(France) Dorian Boccolacci	(France) Louis Gervoson	R3	(France) Vivien Gonnet
4	R2	(France) Serre Chevalier, Hautes-Alpes	20 January	(France) Franck Lagorce	(France) Dorian Boccolacci	(France) Louis Gervoson	R4	(France) Vivien Gonnet
5	R1	(France) Lans-en-Vercors, Isère	25 January	(France) Jean-Baptiste Dubourg	(France) Dorian Boccolacci	(France) Vincent Beltoise	(France) Maxime Emery	
5	R2	(France) Lans-en-Vercors, Isère	26 January	(France) Olivier Panis	(France) Dorian Boccolacci	(France) Vincent Beltoise	(France) Maxime Emery	
6	R1	(France) Super Besse, Puy-de-Dôme	2 February	(France) Franck Lagorce	(France) Dorian Boccolacci	(France) Christophe Ferrier	R1	(France) Sylvain Dabert
6	R1	(France) Super Besse, Puy-de-Dôme	2 February	(France) Franck Lagorce	(France) Dorian Boccolacci	(France) Christophe Ferrier	R2	(France) Sylvain Dabert
6	R2	(France) Super Besse, Puy-de-Dôme	2 February	(France) Jean-Baptiste Dubourg	(France) Louis Gervoson	(France) Christophe Ferrier	R3	(France) Germain Vincenot
6	R2	(France) Super Besse, Puy-de-Dôme	2 February	(France) Jean-Baptiste Dubourg	(France) Louis Gervoson	(France) Christophe Ferrier	R4	(France) Vivien Gonnet
7		Stade de France, Paris	9 February	(France) Aurélien Panis / (France) Olivier Panis		(France) Christophe Ferrier	(France) Sylvain Dabert	

Notes

- The AMV Cup Final and Super Final were always run on the last day of an event with Serre Chevalier and Super Besse being exceptions, where the first Final and Super Final were run on the first day and the second Final and Super Final were run on the last day.

== Championship standings ==
=== Points systems ===
Elite Pro/Elite

Points were awarded for both the two Qualifying sessions, Super Pole and the Super Final. Only the best result of both Qualifying sessions counted. The best time of a driver decided the classification in case of a tie break. For example if Driver A became first in Q1 and eighth in Q2 and Driver B became second in Q1 and first in Q2, but Driver A set the best time, then A would receive the most points. The sum of the points received after Qualifying and Super Pole decided the starting grid for the Super Final. There was no Super Pole in the Elite championship. Points were awarded based on the results as shown in the chart below.
At all events the Elite Pro field was split up into two groups. The top eight drivers after Qualifying (and Super Pole) raced in a normal Super Final and the other drivers raced in a Final. Because eight drivers raced in the Super Final, the winner of the Final was classified as ninth.
Drivers who entered the Stade de France round, which was not part of the regular championship, scored 100 points.

Position	**1st**	**2nd**	**3rd**	**4th**	**5th**	**6th**	**7th**	**8th**	**9th**	**10th**	**11th**	**12th**	**13th**	**14th**	**15th**	**16th**	FL
Qualifying	45	42	40	39	38	37	36	35	34	33	32	31	30	29	28	27	–
Super Pole	7	6	5	4	3	2	1	0	0	0	0	0	0	0	0	0	–
Super Final	16	15	14	13	12	11	10	9	8	7	6	5	4	3	2	1	1

Électrique

The Électrique championship had the same scoring system as the Elite Pro and Elite championships, but with different number of points and the Super Final was called a Final. Also in contrast to the Elite Pro championship, there was no Super Pole.

Position	**1st**	**2nd**	**3rd**	**4th**	**5th**	**6th**	**7th**	**8th**	**9th**	**10th**	**11th**	**12th**	FL
Qualifying	24	22	20	19	18	17	16	15	14	13	12	11	–
Final	12	11	10	9	8	7	6	5	4	3	2	1	1

AMV Cup

Points are awarded based on finishing positions of the Final and Super Final as shown in the chart below.

Position	**1st**	**2nd**	**3rd**	**4th**	**5th**	**6th**	**7th**	**8th**	**9th**	**10th**	**11th**	**12th**	**13th**	**14th**	**15th**	**16th**	**17th**	**18th+**
(Super) Final	30	25	22	19	17	15	13	11	10	9	8	7	6	5	4	3	2	1

Points dropped

In the Elite Pro, Elite and Électrique championships each driver's two lowest-scoring rounds were dropped from their total.

=== Drivers' championships ===
==== Elite Pro ====
(key) Bold – Pole position Italics – Fastest lap in (Super) Final (parentheses) – Round dropped from total

Pos.	Driver	VTH (France)						PCA (Andorra)						ISO (France)						SCH (France)						LVE (France)						SBE (France)						SDF‡ (France)						Points
Pos.	Driver	Q	F1	SF1	Q	F2	SF2	Q	F1	SF1	Q	F2	SF2	Q	F1	SF1	Q	F2	SF2	Q	F1	SF1	Q	F2	SF2	Q	F1	SF1	Q	F2	SF2	Q	F1	SF1	Q	F2	SF2	SF1 D1	SF1 D2	SF2 D1	SF2 D2	F D1	F D2	Points
1	(France) Jean-Baptiste Dubourg	(6^{3})		(7)	C			3^{6}		3	1^{1}		**1**	5^{1}		4	(6^{3})		(5)	1^{1}		**1**	5^{3}		4	1^{4}		**1**	2^{7}		2	2^{5}		4	1^{1}		**1**		2				3	659 (765)
2	(France) Franck Lagorce	2^{4}		6	C			2^{1}		**1**	11	10		2^{6}		2	(10)	(13)		2^{2}		2	1^{1}		**1**	(13)	(13)		5^{4}		8	1^{6}		**1**	4^{3}		4			1		2		624 (697)
3	(France) Aurélien Panis	1^{1}		**1**	C			5^{2}		4	4^{5}		5	(7^{3})		(7)	4^{5}		6	3^{5}		3	2^{6}		3	2^{1}		2	7^{6}		3	4^{3}		5	(5^{7})		(6)	1				1		620 (721)
4	(France) Olivier Panis	4^{6}		3	C									1^{2}		**1**	1^{6}		2	6^{4}		5	10	10		5^{5}		3	1^{2}		**1**	5^{1}		3	3^{4}		3		1				1	619
5	(France) Nathanaël Berthon	(8)		(8)	C			(9)	(**9**)		3^{6}		3	3^{7}		6	3^{2}		3	5^{3}		4	4^{2}		2	8		8	6^{3}		5	3^{2}		2	2^{2}		2			2				606 (693)
6	(France) Benjamin Rivière	7^{5}		4	C			6^{5}		6	5^{7}		4	4^{5}		3	(8)		(7)	4^{6}		8	6^{4}		5	3^{3}		4	3^{1}		4	6^{4}		8	(7^{6})		(7)		4					582 (675)
7	(France) Nicolas Prost	5^{7}		5	C			1^{7}		8	(10)	(11)		(8)		(8)	7^{7}		8	8		7	8		7	4^{2}		5	8		6	8		7	6^{5}		5			3		5		545 (628)
8	(France) Eddy Bénézet	(WD)	(WD)		C			8		7	7^{4}		6	9	**9**		11	10		(10)	(13)		3^{5}		8	6^{6}		7	9	**9**		7^{7}		6	8		8			4		4		514 (551)
9	(France) Didier Thoral	(9)	(**DNS**)		C			4^{4}		2	9	**9**		(10)	(11)		9	**9**		9	**9**		11	9		7^{7}		6	4^{5}		7	10	10		11	10			5				6	503 (576)
10	(France) Olivier Pernaut	3^{2}		2	C			10	10		8		7	(11)	(12)		5^{4}		4	11	10		(12)	(11)		9	**9**		10	10		11	11		10	9					5			502 (576)
11	(France) Gérald Fontanel	10	10		C			12	11		12	12		(12)	(DNS)		(13)	(12)		12	12		13	12		12	12		13	12		12	12		12	11		5						428 (494)
12	(France) Aurélien Comte	12	9		C			11	12		2^{2}		DNS	13	10		12	11		7^{7}		6	9	**13**																	6			385
13	(France) Andréa Dubourg													6^{4}		5	2^{1}		**1**	13	11		7^{7}		6													2				3		303
14	(France) Bertrand Balas							7^{3}		5	6^{3}		2																										3					210
15	(France) Ludovic Gherardi	11	11		C																					11	11		12	13														111
16	(France) Anthony Beltoise																																								4		7	100
17	(France) Jimmy Clairet																															9	**9**		9	**13**								81
18	(France) Teddy Clairet																									10	10		11	11														78
19	(France) Thierry Joncoux																															13	13		13	12								69
	(France) Sébastien Loeb																																								1		2	
	(France) Dorian Boccolacci																																								2		4	(Note: Scored 100 points for the Elite championship.)
	(Norway) Andreas Bakkerud																																								3		5	
	(France) Lionel Daziano																																					3				6		
	(France) Julien Piguet																																							7		7		
	(France) Sylvain Pussier																																					4				8		
	(France) Philippe Bansard																																					6				9		
	(France) Margot Laffite																																							5				
	(France) Joël Lopez																																						6					
	(France) Stéphane Ventaja																																							6				
	(France) Emmanuel Moinel																																					7						
	(France) Louis Gervoson																																								7			
	(France) Matthieu Vaxivière																																						WD					

Notes

- ^{‡} – Non-championship round.
- Positions under 'Q' indicate the classification after Qualifying, but before Super Pole. ^{1} ^{2} ^{3} ^{4} ^{5} ^{6} ^{7} refers to the classification of the drivers after Super Pole.

==== Elite ====
Pos.	Driver	VTH (France)				PCA (Andorra)				ISO (France)				SCH (France)				LVE (France)				SBE (France)				Points
Pos.	Driver	Q	SF1	Q	SF2	Q	SF1	Q	SF2	Q	SF1	Q	SF2	Q	SF1	Q	SF2	Q	SF1	Q	SF2	Q	SF1	Q	SF2	Points
1	(France) Dorian Boccolacci	(3)	(9)	C		(2)	(2)	3	1	1	**1**	1	**1**	1	**1**	1	**1**	1	**1**	1	**1**	1	**1**	2	2	647 (752)
2	(France) Louis Gervoson	6	3	C		1	**1**	1	**3**	(5)	(4)	3	4	4	3	3	2	2	2	(4)	(5)	2	3	1	**1**	610 (722)
3	(France) Margot Laffite	5	6	C		3	3	5	4	2	2	4	3	(6)	(6)	(8)	(7)	3	3	3	3	4	4	3	4	577 (670)
4	(France) Lionel Daziano	1	**2**	C		5	4	(6)	(7)	3	3	6	6	3	2	4	5	4	4	(8)	(7)	3	2	5	5	576 (668)
5	(France) Sylvain Pussier	4	4	C		(6)	(5)	2	2	(6)	(7)	2	2	5	5	2	10	5	5	2	2	5	5	4	3	575 (671)
6	(France) Emmanuel Moinel	2	1	C		7	7	(8)	(8)	4	8	(7)	(9)	2	4	6	3	6	7	5	4	7	6	6	6	551 (639)
7	(France) Stéphane Ventaja	(8)	(7)	C		4	6	4	5	7	5	5	7	7	7	5	4	7	6	6	6	6	9	(8)	(8)	534 (623)
8	(France) Joël Lopez	7	5	C		8	9	7	6	8	6	8	5	(10)	(8)	7	6	8	8	(9)	(10)	8	7	7	7	513 (596)
9	(France) Philippe Bansard	9	8	C		9	8	9	9	9	9	9	8	9	9	10	9					9	8	9	9	481
10	(France) Julien Piguet																									100
11	Julien France													8	10	9	8									85
12	(France) Thierry Joncoux																	WD	WD	7	8					45
Guest drivers ineligible to score points
	(Norway) Andreas Bakkerud																	9	9	10	9					

==== Électrique ====
Pos.	Driver	VTH (France)				PCA (Andorra)				ISO (France)				SCH (France)				LVE (France)				SBE (France)				SDF‡ (France)	Points
Pos.	Driver	Q	F1	Q	F2	Q	F1	Q	F2	Q	F1	Q	F2	Q	F1	Q	F2	Q	F1	Q	F2	Q	F1	Q	F2	SDF‡ (France)	Points
1	(France) Christophe Ferrier	1	**1**	C		1	**1**	1	**1**	1	**1**	1	**1**	1	**1**	(5)	(4)	(1)	(**4**)	2	2	1	**1**	1	**1**	**1**	329 (389)
2	(France) Vincent Beltoise	2	2	C		3	3	2	2	2	3	2	2	4	4	(4)	(6)	2	1	1	**1**	(3)	(6)	2	2	2	293 (346)
3	(France) Louis Gervoson	4	5	C		2	2	(4)	(8)	3	6	4	3	3	3	1	**1**	3	2	4	4	4	3	(6)	(4)	6	271 (321)
4	(France) Louis Rousset	3	3	C		5	4	3	7	4	2	6	5	6	5	3	5	(7)	(6)	5	5	(5)	(9)	4	9	5	240 (285)
5	(France) Sacha Prost	(6)	(6)	C		4	5	7	5	5	5	5	6	5	8	6	3	(4)	(9)	6	6	2	2	3	3	9	239 (279)
6	(France) Clémentine Lhoste	7	8	C		8	7	8	6	6	4	3	4	8	6	7	7	5	5	(8)	(8)	(9)	(8)	8	5	10	213 (252)
7	(France) Franck Montagny	5	4	C																		6	4	5	6		78
8	(France) Matthieu Vaxivière													2	2	2	2										66
9	(France) Guillaume Pley	8	7	C										7	7	8	8									11	64
10	(France) Yann Ehrlacher																	6	3	3	3					3	57
11	(France) Thomas Laurent					7	8	5	3																	7	50
12	(France) Julien Fébreau					6	6	6	4																		50
13	(France) Paul Lamouret																					7	5	7	8		45
14	(France) Stéphane Plaza									7	8	7	7														43
15	(France) Kévin Brouet																	8	7	7	7						43
16	(France) Carine Galli									8	7	8	8														41
17	(France) Claudio Capéo																					10	7	10	7	8	38
18	(France) Perrine Laffont					9	9	9	9																		36
19	(France) Delphine Wespiser																					8	10	9	10		35
17	(France) Thierry Bridron																	9	8	WD	WD						19
18	(France) Tom Villa	9	9	C																							18
19	(France) Cindy Cherchève													WD	WD	9	9										18
	(France) Julien Andlauer																									4	

Notes

- ^{‡} – Non-championship round.

==== AMV Cup ====
Pos.	Driver	VTH (France)		PCA (Andorra)		ISO (France)		SCH (France)				LVE (France)		SBE (France)				SDF‡ (France)	Points
Pos.	Driver	F	SF	F	SF	F	SF	F1	SF1	F2	SF2	F	SF	F1	SF1	F2	SF2	SDF‡ (France)	Points
1	(France) Maxime Emery	C		6	3	2	2	1	1	2	2	1	1	3	3	2	3	5	348
2	(France) Vivien Gonnet	**C**		1	1	4	5	**4**	**2**	**1**	**1**	3	2	2	2	4	1	3	346
3	(France) Sylvain Dabert	C		**2**	**2**	13	3	2	5	7	4	**2**	**3**	**1**	**1**	**3**	**2**	**1**	306
4	(France) Germain Vincenot	C		4	6	**1**	**1**	3	15	4	5	4	4	4	4	1	4	6	281
5	(France) Noël Duvert	C		5	8	7	6	6	6	5	6	14	16	7	5	5	10	17	182
6	(France) Vivian Dabert	C		3	5	3	4	7	3	22	22	19	13	6	7	WD	WD	2	152
7	(France) Maxime Lacour	C		9	7	9	19	8	8	6	7	5	6	10	15	12	8	9	147
8	(France) Romain Gioffre	C		14	13	5	8	22	9	9	21	8	7	11	9	13	14	14	114
9	(France) Randy de Puniet					8	9	13	7	8	8			8	8	6	6	8	114
10	(France) Randy Peresson	C		7	4	10	10	9	10	12	19	9	14	21	20	14	16	20	102
11	(France) Etienne Parseihian	C		12	10			14	12	16	12	7	5	15	16	11	12	15	90
12	(France) Johan Wang Chang	C		8	9	15	17	10	16	17	20	6	15	9	10	15	15	16	88
13	(France) Julien Colomban							5	4	3	3								80
14	(France) Grégoire Martinez	C		13	14	16	15	18	21	18	14	10	8	12	11	9	11	10	79
15	(France) Elie Vecchi	C		10	11	17	13	11	14	10	9			14	14	17	13	7	75
16	(France) Sébastien Valla	C		15	12	11	11	12	13	11	11	17	9	19	17	19	17	13	74
17	(France) Kévin Maliges	C		17	16	12	12	16	22	13	10	11	11	18	18	16	21	12	60
18	(France) Maxime Jeoffre													5	6	10	5	4	58
19	(France) David Baffeleuf							20	11	15	16			20	13	7	7	11	49
20	(France) Elian Gras					18	16	19	17	20	15	13	12	17	19	20	19		30
21	(France) Till De Clercq					6	7												28
22	(France) Vincent Philippe													13	22	8	9		28
23	(France) Loïc Cartier	C		16	15									16	12	18	18	19	19
24	(France) Jarno Langlois	C										12	10						16
25	(France) Jonathan Guenzi	C				14	14					15	18						15
26	(France) Franck Brancy							17	19	14	13								14
27	(Andorra) Xavi España Muñoz			11	17														10
28	(France) Mickaël Ortega							15	18	19	17								8
29	(France) Romain Taurel	C				19	18					16	17						7
30	(France) Mathias Dolci							21	20	21	18								4
31	(France) Hugo Panneciere													22	21	21	20		4
32	(Spain) Alfredo Gomez			18	18														2
33	(France) Melwine Negrillo											18	19						2
34	(France) François Frauziol			19	19														2
	(France) Jordan Labbé																	18	
	(France) Lucas Dandeville	C																	
	(France) Romain Chiabodo	C																	

Notes

- ^{‡} – Non-championship round.

=== Teams' championship ===
Pos.	Team	Points
1	(Belgium) Comtoyou Racing	2411
2	(France) Saintéloc Racing	2181
3	(France) CMR	2102
4	(France) Pussier Automobiles by Clairet Sport	2076
5	(France) DA Racing	1513
6	(France) Exagon Engineering	1169
