= 2026 24 Hours of Le Mans =

94th 24 Hours of Le Mans endurance race

Previous: 2025	Next: 2027
Index: Races | Winners

(France) 2026 24 Hours of Le Mans
Event information
- Round 3 of 8 in the 2026 FIA World Endurance Championship
- Date: 13–14 June 2026
- Location: Le Mans, France
- Venue: Circuit de la Sarthe
- Duration: 24 hours
- Weather: Dry

Results
- Laps completed: 381
- Distance (km): 5191.506
- Distance (miles): 3226.689
- Hypercar

Pole position
- Time: 3:22.564
- Team: (Germany) BMW M Team WRT
- Drivers: (Belgium) Dries Vanthoor

Winners
- Team: (Japan) Toyota Racing
- Drivers: (United Kingdom) Mike Conway (Japan) Kamui Kobayashi (Netherlands) Nyck de Vries
- LMP2

Winners
- Team: (Poland) Inter Europol Competition
- Drivers: (France) Tom Dillmann (Poland) Jakub Śmiechowski (United Kingdom) Nick Yelloly
- LMP2 Pro-Am

Winners
- Team: (United States) CrowdStrike Racing by APR
- Drivers: (Germany) Laurin Heinrich (United States) George Kurtz (United Kingdom) Alex Quinn
- LMGT3

Winners
- Team: (United Kingdom) TF Sport
- Drivers: (Netherlands) Nicky Catsburg (United Kingdom) Jonny Edgar (United States) Ben Keating

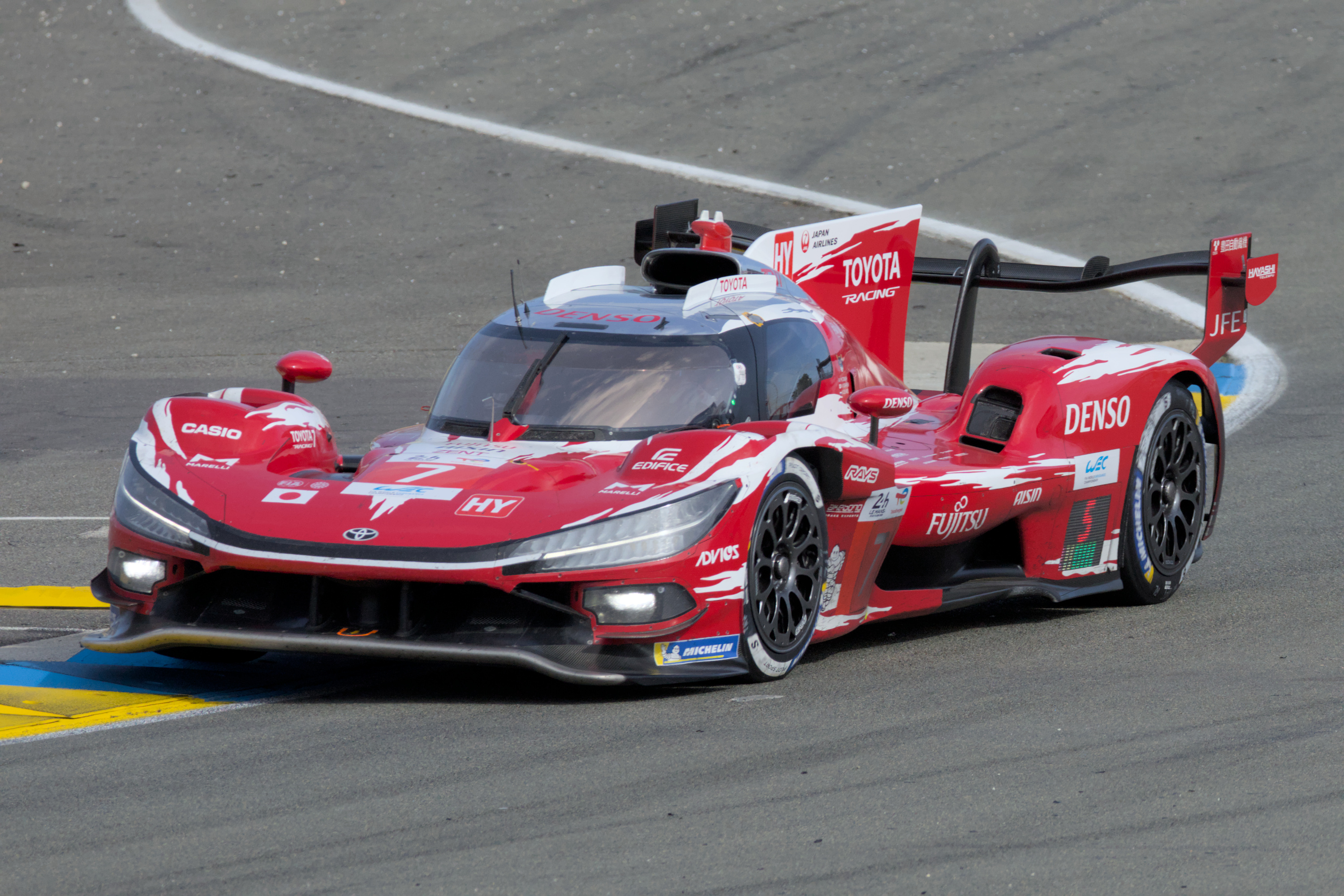
The race-winning No. 7 Toyota TR010

The 94th 24 Hours of Le Mans (French: 94^{e} 24 Heures du Mans) was an automobile endurance race held on 13–14 June 2026 at the Circuit de la Sarthe in Le Mans, France. It was the 94th running of the 24-hour race organised by the Automobile Club de l'Ouest, and the third round of the 2026 FIA World Endurance Championship. Hyundai's luxury division Genesis ran two cars in the Hypercar class, becoming the first South Korean team to compete at the 24-hour race.

In qualifying, pole position was taken by Dries Vanthoor in a BMW M Team WRT Hypercar. The race was closely contested, with numerous lead changes between BMW, Cadillac and Toyota; seven cars finished on the lead lap. The overall classification was won by the #7 Toyota Hypercar, driven by Mike Conway, Kamui Kobayashi and Nyck de Vries, ending a three-year streak for Ferrari. The LMP2 class saw the No. 43 Oreca 07 of Tom Dillmann, Jakub Śmiechowski and Nick Yelloly lead an Inter Europol Competition one-two finish, the team's third victory in four years. The LMGT3 category went to TF Sport's No. 33 Chevrolet Corvette Z06 GT3.R of Nicky Catsburg, Jonny Edgar and Ben Keating, the tenth class win for the American brand.

== Background ==
The 2026 24 Hours of Le Mans was the 94th running of the 24 Hours of Le Mans endurance race, held on 13–14 June 2026 at the Circuit de la Sarthe. The race formed the third round of the 2026 FIA World Endurance Championship season. Manufacturer changes for the 2026 season included Porsche's withdrawal from the WEC Hypercar class and the full-season debut of Genesis Magma Racing, the first South Korean manufacturer team to compete in the top class.

== Entries ==
The 2026 entry list featured 62 cars across three classes; 18 Hypercar, 19 LMP2, and 25 LMGT3. South Korean marque Genesis made its debut in the Hypercar class, entering two Genesis GMR-001 in their maiden WEC campaign.

=== Automatic entries ===
In addition to all full-season WEC entries, automatic invitations were given to all championship winners in the European Le Mans Series (ELMS), LMP2 and LMGT3 in the Asian Le Mans Series (ALMS) and Bronze Cup in GT World Challenge Europe's (GTWCE) combined Endurance and Sprint championship. Second-place finishers in LMP2 in the ELMS also earned an invite. Three IMSA teams were also granted invitations, one in Hypercar at the discretion of IMSA, and one each for the Jim Trueman and Bob Akin awards, given to the highest placed Bronze-rated drivers in IMSA's LMP2 and GT3 classes.

Automatic entries for the 2026 24 Hours of Le Mans
Reason invited	Hypercar	LMP2	LMGT3
1st in the European Le Mans Series (LMP2 and LMGT3)		(France) VDS Panis Racing	(United Kingdom) TF Sport
2nd in the European Le Mans Series (LMP2)		(Poland) Inter Europol Competition	
1st in the European Le Mans Series (LMP2 Pro-Am)		(United States) AO by TF	
1st in the European Le Mans Series (LMP3)		(Switzerland) CLX Motorsport	
IMSA SportsCar Championship at-large entries	(United States) Cadillac Wayne Taylor Racing (Note: As reigning IMSA GTP champion, Porsche Penske Motorsport had right of first refusal for the invitation. However, Porsche's withdrawal from WEC's Hypercar class meant no Porsche 963 could be present at Le Mans. IMSA subsequently granted the entry to Wayne Taylor Racing.)	(United States) P. J. Hyett	(Canada) Orey Fidani
1st in the Asian Le Mans Series (LMP2 and GT)		(United States) CrowdStrike Racing by APR	(Switzerland) Kessel Racing
1st in the GT World Challenge Europe (Bronze Cup)			(Switzerland) Kessel Racing

=== Entry list ===
Entries in the LMP2 Pro-Am Cup, set aside for teams with a Bronze-rated driver in their line-up, are denoted with icons.

Icon	Series
WEC	FIA World Endurance Championship
ELMS	European Le Mans Series
ALMS	Asian Le Mans Series
IMSA	IMSA SportsCar Championship
GTWC	GT World Challenge Europe
24LM	24 Hours of Le Mans only
Icon	MISC
P2	LMP2
PA	LMP2 Pro-Am

No.	Entrant	Car	Tyre	Series	MISC	Driver 1	Driver 2	Driver 3
Hypercar (18 entries)
007	(United States) Aston Martin THOR Team	Aston Martin Valkyrie	M	WEC		(United Kingdom) Tom Gamble	(United Kingdom) Ross Gunn	(United Kingdom) Harry Tincknell
009	(United States) Aston Martin THOR Team	Aston Martin Valkyrie	M	WEC		(Canada) Roman De Angelis	(Spain) Alex Riberas	(Denmark) Marco Sørensen
7	(Japan) Toyota Racing	Toyota TR010 Hybrid	M	WEC	Hybrid	(United Kingdom) Mike Conway	(Japan) Kamui Kobayashi	(Netherlands) Nyck de Vries
8	(Japan) Toyota Racing	Toyota TR010 Hybrid	M	WEC	Hybrid	(Switzerland) Sébastien Buemi	(New Zealand) Brendon Hartley	(Japan) Ryō Hirakawa
12	(United States) Cadillac Hertz Team Jota	Cadillac V-Series.R	M	WEC	Hybrid	(Switzerland) Louis Delétraz	(France) Norman Nato	(United Kingdom) Will Stevens
15	(Germany) BMW M Team WRT	BMW M Hybrid V8	M	WEC	Hybrid	(Denmark) Kevin Magnussen	(Switzerland) Raffaele Marciello	(Belgium) Dries Vanthoor
17	(South Korea) Genesis Magma Racing	Genesis GMR-001	M	WEC	Hybrid	(Brazil) Pipo Derani	(France) Mathys Jaubert	(Germany) André Lotterer
19	(South Korea) Genesis Magma Racing	Genesis GMR-001	M	WEC	Hybrid	(France) Paul-Loup Chatin	(France) Mathieu Jaminet	(Spain) Daniel Juncadella
20	(Germany) BMW M Team WRT	BMW M Hybrid V8	M	WEC	Hybrid	(Netherlands) Robin Frijns	(Germany) René Rast	(South Africa) Sheldon van der Linde
35	(France) Alpine Endurance Team	Alpine A424	M	WEC	Hybrid	(Portugal) António Félix da Costa	(Austria) Ferdinand Habsburg	(France) Charles Milesi
36	(France) Alpine Endurance Team	Alpine A424	M	WEC	Hybrid	(France) Jules Gounon	(France) Frédéric Makowiecki	(France) Victor Martins
38	(United States) Cadillac Hertz Team Jota	Cadillac V-Series.R	M	WEC	Hybrid	(United Kingdom) Jack Aitken	(New Zealand) Earl Bamber	(France) Sébastien Bourdais
50	(Italy) Ferrari AF Corse	Ferrari 499P	M	WEC	Hybrid	(Italy) Antonio Fuoco	(Spain) Miguel Molina	(Denmark) Nicklas Nielsen
51	(Italy) Ferrari AF Corse	Ferrari 499P	M	WEC	Hybrid	(United Kingdom) James Calado	(Italy) Antonio Giovinazzi	(Italy) Alessandro Pier Guidi
83	(Italy) AF Corse	Ferrari 499P	M	WEC	Hybrid	(United Kingdom) Phil Hanson	(Poland) Robert Kubica	(China) Yifei Ye
93	(France) Peugeot TotalEnergies	Peugeot 9X8	M	WEC	Hybrid	(New Zealand) Nick Cassidy	(United Kingdom) Paul di Resta	(Belgium) Stoffel Vandoorne
94	(France) Peugeot TotalEnergies	Peugeot 9X8	M	WEC	Hybrid	(France) Loïc Duval	(Denmark) Malthe Jakobsen	(France) Théo Pourchaire
101	(United States) Cadillac WTR	Cadillac V-Series.R	M	IMSA	Hybrid	(Portugal) Filipe Albuquerque	(United States) Jordan Taylor	(United States) Ricky Taylor
LMP2 (19 entries)
3	(Luxembourg) DKR Engineering	Oreca 07-Gibson	G	ALMS	PA	(Mexico) Sebastián Álvarez	(Canada) John Farano	(Netherlands) Renger van der Zande
4	(United States) CrowdStrike Racing by APR	Oreca 07-Gibson	G	ALMS	PA	(Germany) Laurin Heinrich	(United States) George Kurtz	(United Kingdom) Alex Quinn
9	(Germany) Proton Competition	Oreca 07-Gibson	G	ELMS	P2	(United Kingdom) Harry King	(Japan) Kakunoshin Ohta	(Germany) Jonas Ried
14	(France) TDS Racing	Oreca 07-Gibson	G	IMSA	PA	(Switzerland) Mathias Beche	(France) Kévin Estre	(Canada) Tobias Lütke
22	(United Kingdom) United Autosports	Oreca 07-Gibson	G	ELMS	P2	(Denmark) Mikkel Jensen	(Sweden) Rasmus Lindh	(Switzerland) Grégoire Saucy
24	(United Kingdom) Nielsen Racing	Oreca 07-Gibson	G	ELMS	P2	(Australia) Jack Doohan	(Denmark) David Heinemeier Hansson	(United Kingdom) Edward Pearson
25	(Portugal) Algarve Pro Racing	Oreca 07-Gibson	G	ELMS	PA	(United Kingdom) Jake Hughes	(Denmark) Michael Jensen	(Italy) Enzo Trulli
26	(United Kingdom) Vector Sport	Oreca 07-Gibson	G	ELMS	P2	(Republic of Ireland) Ryan Cullen	(Brazil) Pietro Fittipaldi	(Grenada) Vladislav Lomko (Note: Boguslavskiy is Russian, but he competes as a neutral competitor as Russian national emblems were banned by the FIA following the Russian invasion of Ukraine. Lomko, also Russian, competes under a Grenadian licence for the same reason.)
28	(France) IDEC Sport	Oreca 07-Gibson	G	ELMS	P2	(France) Paul Lafargue	(Italy) Valerio Rinicella	(Netherlands) Job van Uitert
29	(France) Forestier Racing by Panis	Oreca 07-Gibson	G	ELMS	P2	(United Kingdom) Oliver Gray	(France) Esteban Masson	(France) Louis Rousset
30	(France) Duqueine Team	Oreca 07-Gibson	G	ELMS	P2	(France) Julien Andlauer	(France) Doriane Pin	(Netherlands) Richard Verschoor
37	(Switzerland) CLX Motorsport	Oreca 07-Gibson	G	ELMS	P2	(Mexico) Ian Aguilera	(France) Adrien Closmenil	(Denmark) Theodor Jensen
43	(Poland) Inter Europol Competition	Oreca 07-Gibson	G	ELMS	P2	(France) Tom Dillmann	(Poland) Jakub Śmiechowski	(United Kingdom) Nick Yelloly
44	(Germany) Proton Competition	Oreca 07-Gibson	G	ALMS	PA	(Austria) Horst Felbermayr Jr.	(Austria) Horst Felix Felbermayr	(Spain) Lorenzo Fluxá
48	(France) RD Limited	Oreca 07-Gibson	G	ALMS	PA	(France) Romain Dumas	(United States) Fred Poordad	(France) Tristan Vautier
99	(United States) AO by TF	Oreca 07-Gibson	G	ELMS	PA	(Australia) James Allen	(United States) Dane Cameron	(United States) P. J. Hyett
183	(Italy) AF Corse	Oreca 07-Gibson	G	ELMS	PA	(United Kingdom) Ben Barnicoat	(France) François Perrodo	(France) Matthieu Vaxivière
222	(United Kingdom) United Autosports	Oreca 07-Gibson	G	ELMS	PA	(United Kingdom) Ben Hanley	(United Kingdom) Oliver Jarvis	(Brazil) Daniel Schneider
343	(Poland) Inter Europol Competition	Oreca 07-Gibson	G	ELMS	P2	(France) Reshad de Gerus	(United States) Bijoy Garg	(Switzerland) Nico Müller
LMGT3 (25 entries)
2	(United Kingdom) TF Sport	Chevrolet Corvette Z06 GT3.R	G	ELMS		(United Kingdom) Ben Green	(United Kingdom) Lorcan Hanafin	(Malaysia) Prince Jefri Ibrahim
10	(United Kingdom) Garage 59	McLaren 720S GT3 Evo	G	WEC		(Hong Kong) Antares Au	(United Kingdom) Tom Fleming	(Germany) Marvin Kirchhöfer
13	(Canada) 13 Autosport	Chevrolet Corvette Z06 GT3.R	G	IMSA		(United Kingdom) Matt Bell	(Canada) Orey Fidani	(Germany) Lars Kern
21	(Italy) Vista AF Corse	Ferrari 296 GT3 Evo	G	WEC		(France) François Hériau	(United States) Simon Mann	(Italy) Alessio Rovera
23	(United States) Heart of Racing Team	Aston Martin Vantage AMR GT3 Evo	G	WEC		(United Kingdom) Jonny Adam	(Brazil) Eduardo Barrichello	(United States) Gray Newell
27	(United States) Heart of Racing Team	Aston Martin Vantage AMR GT3 Evo	G	WEC		(Italy) Mattia Drudi	(United Kingdom) Ian James	(Canada) Zacharie Robichon
32	(Belgium) Team WRT	BMW M4 GT3 Evo	G	WEC		(Brazil) Augusto Farfus	(Indonesia) Sean Gelael	(United Kingdom) Darren Leung
33	(United Kingdom) TF Sport	Chevrolet Corvette Z06 GT3.R	G	WEC		(Netherlands) Nicky Catsburg	(United Kingdom) Jonny Edgar	(United States) Ben Keating
34	Racing Team Turkey by TF	Chevrolet Corvette Z06 GT3.R	G	WEC		(Republic of Ireland) Peter Dempsey	(Republic of Ireland) Charlie Eastwood	(Turkey) Salih Yoluç
54	(Italy) Vista AF Corse	Ferrari 296 GT3 Evo	G	WEC		(Italy) Francesco Castellacci	(Switzerland) Thomas Flohr	(Italy) Davide Rigon
57	(Switzerland) Kessel Racing	Ferrari 296 GT3 Evo	G	ELMS		(Denmark) Conrad Laursen	(Japan) Takeshi Kimura	(Brazil) Daniel Serra
58	(United Kingdom) Garage 59	McLaren 720S GT3 Evo	G	WEC		(Germany) Finn Gehrsitz	(Germany) Benjamin Goethe	(Sweden) Alexander West
59	(France) Racing Spirit of Léman	Aston Martin Vantage AMR GT3 Evo	G	ELMS		(France) Marius Fossard	(France) Valentin Hasse-Clot	(France) Clément Mateu
61	(Italy) Iron Lynx	Mercedes-AMG GT3 Evo	G	WEC		(Angola) Rui Andrade	(Australia) Martin Berry	(Belgium) Maxime Martin
62	Team Qatar by Iron Lynx	Mercedes-AMG GT3 Evo	G	ELMS		(Qatar) Abdulla Al-Khelaifi	(France) Giuliano Alesi	(Germany) Julian Hanses
69	(Belgium) Team WRT	BMW M4 GT3 Evo	G	WEC		(United Kingdom) Dan Harper	(United States) Anthony McIntosh	(Canada) Parker Thompson
74	(Switzerland) Kessel Racing	Ferrari 296 GT3 Evo	G	GTWC		(United States) Dustin Blattner	(Germany) Dennis Marschall	(Italy) Lorenzo Patrese
77	(Germany) Proton Competition	Ford Mustang GT3 Evo	G	WEC		(United States) Eric Powell	(United Kingdom) Sebastian Priaulx	(United Kingdom) Ben Tuck
78	(France) Akkodis ASP Team	Lexus RC F GT3	G	WEC		(France) Hadrien David	(United Kingdom) Jack Hawksworth	(Belgium) Tom Van Rompuy
79	(Italy) Iron Lynx	Mercedes-AMG GT3 Evo	G	WEC		(Italy) Matteo Cressoni	(Netherlands) Lin Hodenius	(Italy) Johannes Zelger
87	(France) Akkodis ASP Team	Lexus RC F GT3	G	WEC		(Argentina) José María López	(Austria) Clemens Schmid	(Romania) Petru Umbrărescu
88	(Germany) Proton Competition	Ford Mustang GT3 Evo	G	WEC		(Italy) Stefano Gattuso	(Italy) Giammarco Levorato	(United States) Logan Sargeant
91	(Germany) Manthey DK Engineering	Porsche 911 GT3 R (992.2)	G	WEC		Timur Boguslavskiy	(United Kingdom) James Cottingham	(Turkey) Ayhancan Güven
92	(Germany) The Bend Manthey	Porsche 911 GT3 R (992.2)	G	WEC		(Austria) Richard Lietz	(Italy) Riccardo Pera	(Australia) Yasser Shahin
150	(Italy) Richard Mille AF Corse	Ferrari 296 GT3 Evo	G	ELMS		(Italy) Riccardo Agostini	(Brazil) Custodio Toledo	(France) Lilou Wadoux

=== Reserve entries ===
In addition to the sixty-two entries given invitations for the race, nine entries were put on a reserve list to potentially replace any invitations that were not accepted or withdrawn. Reserve entries are ordered with the first reserve replacing the first withdrawal from the race, regardless of the class of either entry.

Reserve	Class	No.	Entrant	Car	Tyre	Series	MISC	Driver 1	Driver 2	Driver 3
1st	LMGT3	86	(United Kingdom) GR Racing	Ferrari 296 GT3 Evo	G	ELMS		(United Kingdom) Michael Wainwright	TBA	TBA
2nd	LMGT3	56	(United Kingdom) Blackthorn	Aston Martin Vantage AMR GT3 Evo	G	ALMS		(United Kingdom) Dario Franchitti	(Italy) Giacomo Petrobelli	TBA
3rd	LMP2	18	(France) IDEC Sport	Oreca 07-Gibson	G	ELMS	P2	TBA	TBA	TBA
4th	LMP2	16	(United Kingdom) Vector Sport	Oreca 07-Gibson	G	ELMS	PA	(Turkey) Cem Bölükbaşı	TBA	TBA
5th	LMGT3	151	(Italy) AF Corse	Ferrari 296 GT3 Evo	G	ELMS		(France) Charles-Henri Samani	TBA	TBA
6th	LMP2	11	(Germany) Proton Competition	Oreca 07-Gibson	G	ELMS	PA	TBA	TBA	TBA
WD	LMP2	47	(Italy) Cetilar Racing	Oreca 07-Gibson	G	ALMS	PA	(Italy) Nicola Lacorte	(Italy) Roberto Lacorte	TBA
WD	LMP2	137	(Switzerland) CLX Motorsport	Oreca 07-Gibson	G	ELMS	PA	TBA	TBA	TBA
WD	LMGT3	95	(United Kingdom) United Autosports	McLaren 720S GT3 Evo	G	ELMS		(United Kingdom) Michael Birch	(United Kingdom) Wayne Boyd	(Australia) Garnet Patterson

== Testing ==
Prior to the race, all entrants were required to participate in a test day, which took place on 7 June.

The 62 cars were given six hours of track time across two sessions, running from 10:00 to 13:00 and from 15:30 to 18:30 CEST (UTC+02:00). In the Hypercar class, Tom Gamble in the #007 Aston Martin THOR Team Valkyrie set the fastest lap of the day with an afternoon time of 3:26.293, narrowly short of the 2025 benchmark. Brendon Hartley in the #8 Toyota and Norman Nato in the #12 Cadillac rounded out the top three, with all eight manufacturers split by 0.915 seconds. The #15 BMW M Team WRT turned the most laps of any car during the test day, with 86 laps or 1,171 kilometres (728 mi). A crash during the morning session saw damage to the #8 Toyota and #25 Algarve Pro Racing, as rookie Jake Hughes spun on cold tyres at the Dunlop Curve and hit Ryo Hirakawa. In LMP2, Job van Uitert in the #28 IDEC Sport set the fastest time of 3:35.344, just ahead of Mathias Beche, who was quickest in LMP2 Pro-Am aboard the #14 TDS Racing. In LMGT3, silver-rated Francesco Castellacci topped the times with a 3:56.646 in his #54 Vista AF Corse Ferrari 296 GT3 Evo.

A number of reserve drivers also turned laps at the test day, including Toyota's Esteban Masson, BMW's Philipp Eng and Genesis' Jamie Chadwick, who became the first woman to drive a Hypercar at Le Mans. Porsche and McLaren factory driver Laurens Vanthoor was a late addition to United Autosports' LMP2 roster and drove the #22 Oreca 07.

== Practice ==
=== Practice 1 ===
Class	No.	Entrant	Driver	Time
Hypercar	38	(United States) Cadillac Hertz Team Jota	(New Zealand) Earl Bamber	3:23.786
LMP2	30	(France) Duqueine Team	(France) Doriane Pin	3:35.248
LMP2 Pro-Am	14	(France) TDS Racing	(France) Kévin Estre	3:35.958
LMGT3	78	(France) Akkodis ASP Team	(United Kingdom) Jack Hawksworth	3:55.737
Sources:

- Note: Only the fastest car in each class is shown.

=== Practice 2 ===
Class	No.	Entrant	Driver	Time
Hypercar	7	(Japan) Toyota Racing	(Japan) Kamui Kobayashi	3:26.096
LMP2	29	(France) Forestier Racing by Panis	(France) Esteban Masson	3:33.645
LMP2 Pro-Am	4	(United States) CrowdStrike Racing by APR	(United Kingdom) Alex Quinn	3:34.965
LMGT3	32	(Belgium) Team WRT	(Brazil) Augusto Farfus	3:55.132
Sources:

- Note: Only the fastest car in each class is shown.

=== Practice 3 ===
Class	No.	Entrant	Driver	Time
Hypercar	15	(Germany) BMW M Team WRT	(Belgium) Dries Vanthoor	3:23.302
LMP2	29	(France) Forestier Racing by Panis	(United Kingdom) Oliver Gray	3:34.252
LMP2 Pro-Am	14	(France) TDS Racing	(France) Kévin Estre	3:34.769
LMGT3	23	(United States) Heart of Racing Team	(Brazil) Eduardo Barrichello	3:53.728
Sources:

- Note: Only the fastest car in each class is shown.

=== Practice 4 ===
Class	No.	Entrant	Driver	Time
Hypercar	38	(United States) Cadillac Hertz Team Jota	(France) Sébastien Bourdais	3:26.843
LMP2	30	(France) Duqueine Team	(France) Doriane Pin	3:36.801
LMP2 Pro-Am	183	(Italy) AF Corse	(United Kingdom) Ben Barnicoat	3:36.111
LMGT3	33	(United Kingdom) TF Sport	(United Kingdom) Jonny Edgar	3:55.262
Sources:

- Note: Only the fastest car in each class is shown.

== Qualifying ==
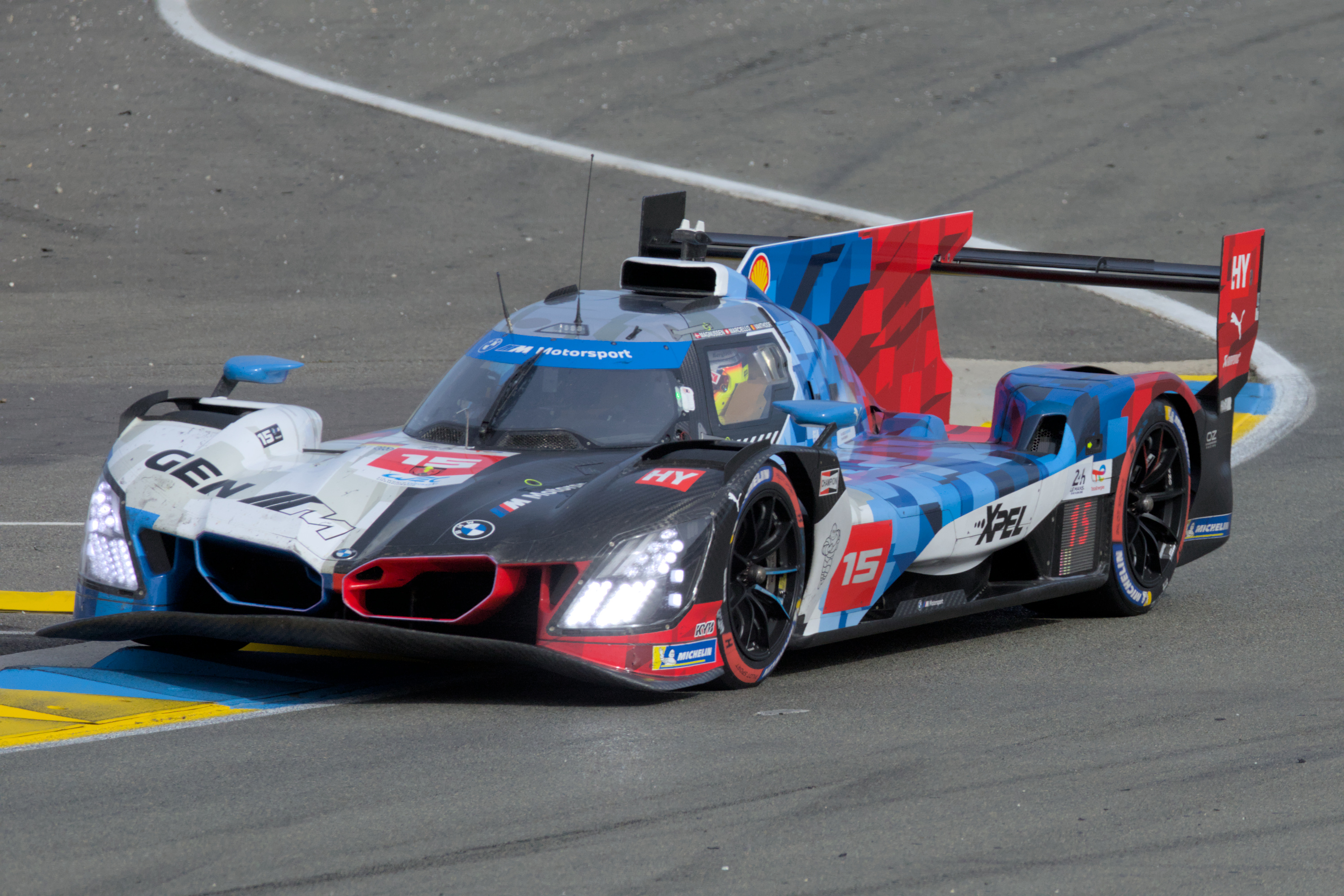
The No. 15 BMW M Hybrid V8 took pole position for the race.

=== Qualifying results ===
Pole positions in each class are denoted in bold.

Final qualifying classification
Pos	Class	No.	Team	Qualifying	Hyperpole 1	Hyperpole 2	Grid
1	**Hypercar**	**15**	**BMW M Team WRT**	3:23.625	3:23.280	**3:22.564**	1
2	Hypercar	12	Cadillac Hertz Team Jota	3:23.148	3:23.728	3:23.078	2
3	Hypercar	35	Alpine Endurance Team	3:23.135	3:23.018	3:23.620	3
4	Hypercar	20	BMW M Team WRT	3:23.444	3:23.246	3:23.764	4
5	Hypercar	101	Cadillac WTR	3:23.323	3:23.191	3:23.778	5
6	Hypercar	19	Genesis Magma Racing	3:24.084	3:23.643	3:23.823	6
7	Hypercar	009	Aston Martin THOR Team	3:23.777	3:23.991	3:24.729	7
8	Hypercar	51	Ferrari AF Corse	3:24.623	3:23.406	3:25.081	8
9	Hypercar	17	Genesis Magma Racing	3:24.424	3:23.126	3:26.116	9
10	Hypercar	38	Cadillac Hertz Team Jota	3:23.485	3:23.091	3:26.865^{1}	10
11	Hypercar	007	Aston Martin THOR Team	3:23.906	3:24.004		11
12	Hypercar	50	Ferrari AF Corse	3:24.514	3:24.105		12
13	Hypercar	36	Alpine Endurance Team	3:23.960	3:24.122		13
14	Hypercar	7	Toyota Racing	3:24.314	3:24.268		14
15	Hypercar	8	Toyota Racing	3:23.791	3:24.578		15
16	Hypercar	93	Peugeot TotalEnergies	3:24.978			16
17	Hypercar	83	AF Corse	3:25.495			17
18	Hypercar	94	Peugeot TotalEnergies	3:25.660			18
19	**LMP2**	**29**	**Forestier Racing by Panis**	3:36.098	3:34.108	**3:32.855**	20^{2}
20	LMP2	28	IDEC Sport	3:37.725	3:34.612	3:33.242	19
21	LMP2	24	Nielsen Racing	3:37.665	3:35.140	3:33.510	21
22	LMP2	43	Inter Europol Competition	3:37.004	3:33.762	3:33.578	22
23	**LMP2 Pro-Am**	**4**	**CrowdStrike Racing by APR**	3:39.369	3:33.889	**3:33.628**	23
24	LMP2	30	Duqueine Team	3:34.662	3:34.813	3:33.702	24
25	LMP2 Pro-Am	14	TDS Racing	3:40.264	3:34.542	3:33.715	25
26	LMP2 Pro-Am	99	AO by TF	3:38.698	3:34.845	3:34.280	26
27	LMP2 Pro-Am	183	AF Corse	3:39.985	3:34.789	3:34.692	27
28	LMP2	343	Inter Europol Competition	3:35.247	3:34.179	3:35.038	28
29	LMP2	22	United Autosports	3:37.564	3:35.510		29
30	LMP2 Pro-Am	222	United Autosports	3:41.418	3:35.688		30
31	LMP2	26	Vector Sport	3:36.555	3:35.982		31
32	LMP2	37	CLX Motorsport	3:35.229	3:37.419		32
33	LMP2	9	Proton Competition	3:38.088	3:44.697		33
34	LMP2 Pro-Am	44	Proton Competition	3:41.453			34
35	LMP2 Pro-Am	25	Algarve Pro Racing	3:42.739			35
36	LMP2 Pro-Am	48	RD Limited	3:42.856			36
37	LMP2 Pro-Am	3	DKR Engineering	3:43.551			37
38	**LMGT3**	**27**	**Heart of Racing Team**	3:56.688	3:53.166	**3:52.433**	38
39	LMGT3	21	Vista AF Corse	3:56.962	3:54.652	3:53.412	39
40	LMGT3	87	Akkodis ASP Team	3:56.581	3:54.495	3:53.614	40
41	LMGT3	78	Akkodis ASP Team	3:57.261	3:54.340	3:53.869	41
42	LMGT3	32	Team WRT	3:56.537	3:53.337	3:54.401	42
43	LMGT3	69	Team WRT	3:56.700	3:54.699	3:54.655	43
44	LMGT3	74	Kessel Racing	3:56.560	3:54.665	3:54.677	44
45	LMGT3	23	Heart of Racing Team	3:55.975	3:53.723	3:54.888	45
46	LMGT3	91	Manthey DK Engineering	3:56.183	3:53.561	3:55.610	46
47	LMGT3	77	Proton Competition	3:55.951	3:54.528	3:55.666	47
48	LMGT3	88	Proton Competition	3:56.931	3:54.753		48
49	LMGT3	62	Team Qatar by Iron Lynx	3:57.531	3:54.771		49
50	LMGT3	61	Iron Lynx	3:56.950	3:55.003		50
51	LMGT3	54	Vista AF Corse	3:57.277	3:55.175		51
52	LMGT3	92	The Bend Manthey	3:57.466	3:55.314		52
53	LMGT3	10	Garage 59	3:57.662			53
54	LMGT3	33	TF Sport	3:57.724			54
55	LMGT3	79	Iron Lynx	3:57.776			55
56	LMGT3	150	Richard Mille AF Corse	3:57.991			56
57	LMGT3	57	Kessel Racing	3:58.109			57
58	LMGT3	59	Racing Spirit of Léman	3:58.395			58
59	LMGT3	58	Garage 59	3:59.352			59
60	LMGT3	2	TF Sport	3:59.592			60
61	LMGT3	13	13 Autosport	4:00.258			61
62	LMGT3	34	Racing Team Turkey by TF	Disqualified^{3}			62

Notes

- **^1** – The #38 Cadillac Hertz Team Jota set a time of 3:22.559, but it was later deleted after the completion of Hyperpole 2 due to leaving the working lane to join the fast lane of the pit area before being authorised to do so, before the start of the final session.
- **^2** – The #29 Forestier Racing by Panis set the fastest time in Hyperpole 2, but received a one-place grid penalty for impeding the #58 Garage 59 McLaren.
- **^3** – The #34 Racing Team Turkey by TF set the fastest time in the first Qualifying session but was disqualified after failing post-session scrutineering. Officials found the Corvette's rear diffuser strake height to have breached regulations having suffered excessive wear.

== Race ==
=== Overall race and Hypercar ===
The ceremonial starter was cyclist Mark Cavendish. By the first corner, Cadillac's Will Stevens overtook pole-sitter Kevin Magnussen. When the cars reached the Mulsanne Straight on the first lap, René Rast in the other BMW took the lead. Both Ferrari AF Corse cars gained places on the opening lap, the #51 gaining one place to 7th and the #50 moving from 12th on the grid to 9th. Mike Conway in the #7 Toyota used an undercut, pitting after only 29 minutes followed by the sister #8 car. At the one hour mark, and after the first round of stops, this strategy had put the #8 car in the lead with the #7 car in fifth position.

After two and a half hours, Antonio Fuoco in the #50 car made contact with an LMP2 and spun, but quickly rejoined without further incident. In the fourth hour, a full-course yellow flag forced the #20 BMW, #12 Cadillac, and #101 Cadillac into the pits for emergency services. Later, Alessandro Pier Guidi in the #51 car slid and crashed into the #9 Proton Competition LMP2 at the Forest esses, forcing them both into the bollards, although both cars had minimal damage. The #51 Ferrari AF Corse was given a drive-through penalty for the incident, dropping it from sixth to tenth. The #83 AF Corse was given a 5-second penalty for an unsafe release from the pit lane. After the #8 Toyota pitted before the fifth hour, Jack Aitken's #38 Cadillac took the lead from Sheldon van der Linde. Dries Vanthoor's #15 BMW clipped the #3 DKR LMP2 in the Porsche Curves, damaging Vanthoor's bodywork and causing a puncture.

The safety car was deployed after the #88 Proton Ford and #54 AF Corse Ferrari LMGT3s crashed at the Forest esses, with the #54 car becoming stranded in the gravel. As multiple cars took pit stops under the safety car, the lead rapidly changed hands several times, going to Sébastien Buemi's #8 Toyota, followed by René Rast's #20 BMW, Will Stevens' #12 Cadillac, Earl Bamber's #38 Cadillac, and Nicklas Nielsen's #50 Ferrari. Immediately after the end of the safety car, the #50 Ferrari was forced to pit with a fire extinguisher system issue, which took 29 minutes to fix. Mathys Jaubert's #17 Genesis then suffered a puncture.

The #8 Toyota pitted during the tenth hour, giving Cadillac the 1–2 positions, with the #12 in the lead, after both cleared the BMW of Rast. Paul-Loup Chatin's #19 Genesis briefly stopped with an issue, causing a full-course yellow flag. The #38 Cadillac suffered a power steering issue, forcing a half-hour pitstop that dropped them 7 laps. The #8 Toyota and #101 Cadillac were given drive-through penalties for speeding under the full-course yellow. The #19 Genesis experienced more problems when it pulled over on the road and required a power cycle to rejoin the race several laps down. The #38 Cadillac returned to the pits with further power steering problems; they were unable to rejoin the race and retired.

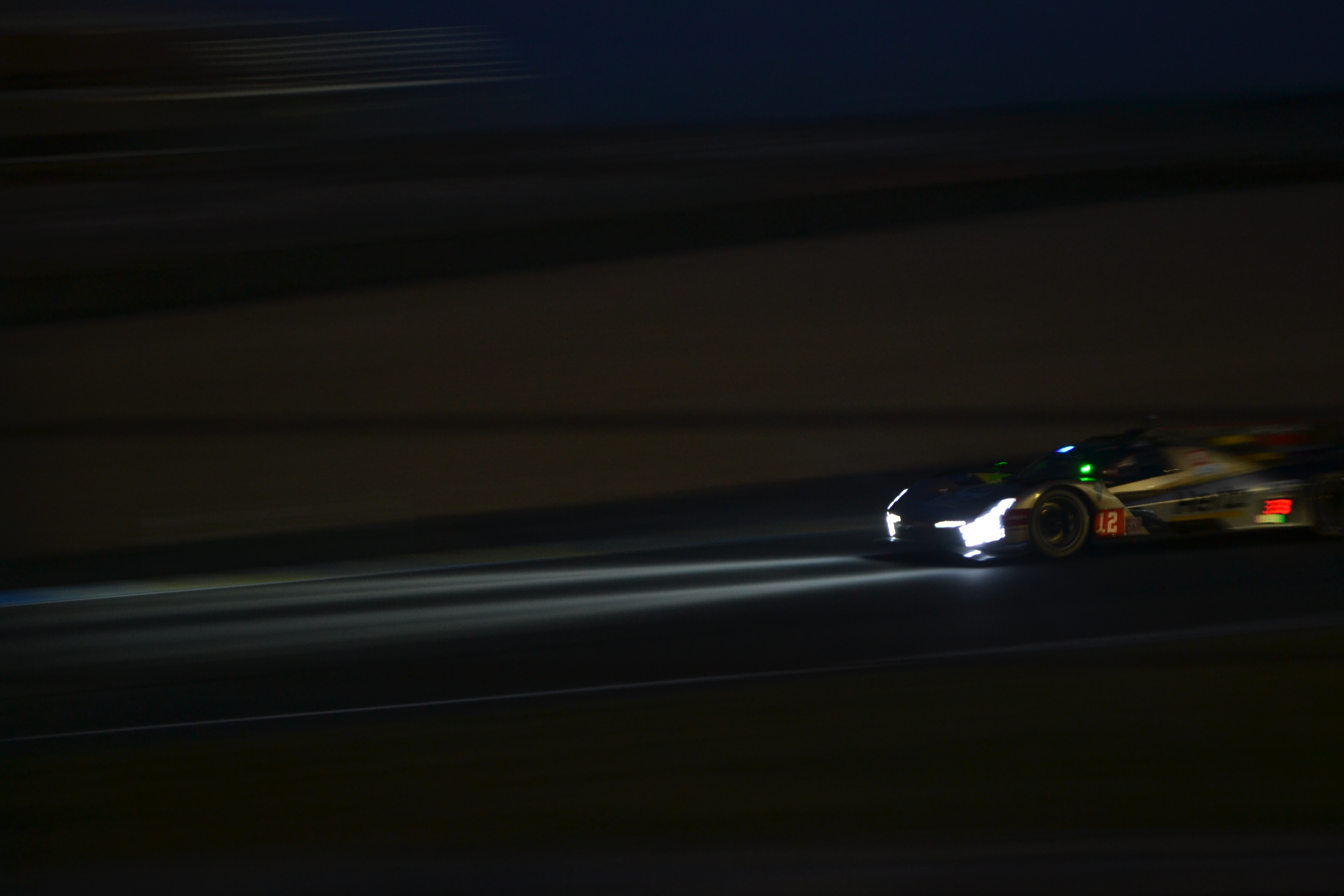
The No. 12 Hertz Team Jota Cadillac V-Series.R led through the night and early morning before being given a drive through in the 16th hour.

By the 16th hour, the #12 Cadillac held a 47-second lead over the #8 Toyota, with the #20 BMW in third. However, the #12 of Louis Delétraz was given a drive-through penalty for speeding in a slow zone. This gave Brendon Hartley's #8 Toyota the lead, though under pressure from Sheldon van der Linde's #20 BMW. Mathys Jaubert's #17 Genesis snapped its right-front suspension after going over a kerb, forcing retirement. The #8 Toyota next required a brake drum mounting change, dropping to fourth. The #50 Ferrari pulled over due to an electrical issue, retiring from the race under a safety car period caused by the #91 Manthey Porsche LMGT3 crashing at the exit of the first Mulsanne Chicane. At the restart, the running order was Robin Frijns' #20 BMW leading, followed by Norman Nato's #12 Cadillac, Kamui Kobayashi's #7 Toyota, and Ryo Hirakawa's #8 Toyota.

With four and a half hours remaining, Robin Frijns drove through the gravel in pit entry—the time lost meaning his #20 BMW emerged fourth after the pit stops. The #12 Cadillac driven by Norman Nato inherited the lead, but struggled at the end of its stint, allowing both Brendon Hartley in the #8 and Nyck de Vries in the #7 to pass, giving Toyota the 1–2 positions by the end of the 21st hour. With De Vries already on new tyres, the next pit sequence allowed the #7 to cycle into the lead, with a 22-second margin to the #20 BMW.

Just before the beginning of the final hour, the #009 Aston Martin suffered a rear suspension failure; driver Alex Riberas reached the pits but rejoined several laps down. With 47 minutes left, Robin Frijns in the #20 BMW overtook Sébastien Buemi's #8 Toyota, running on older tyres, for second place. The race ended with the #7 Toyota driven by Kamui Kobayashi in first place, with Robin Frijns in the #20 BMW in second, and Sébastien Buemi third for the #8 Toyota.

=== LMP2 and LMP2 Pro-Am ===
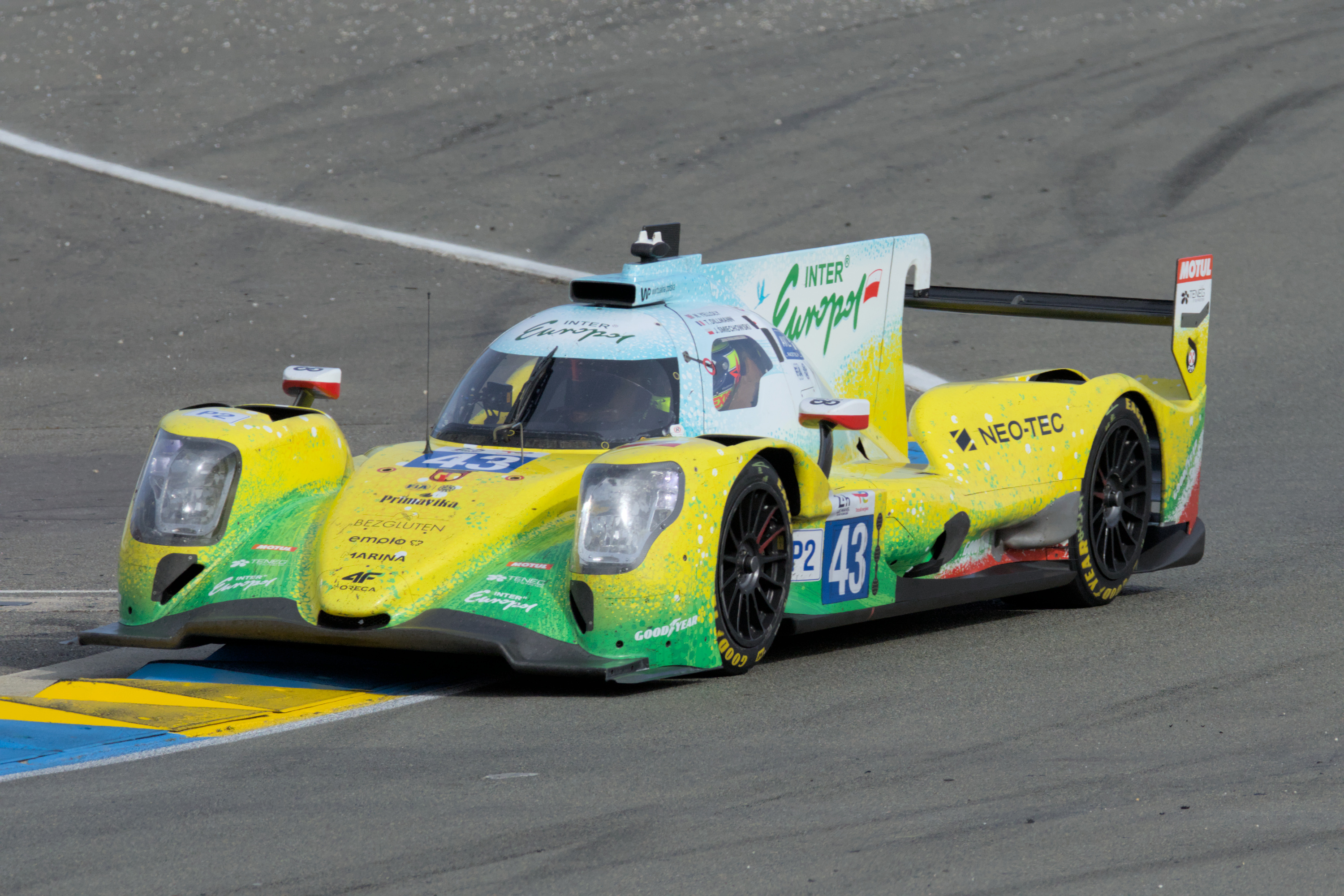
The No. 43 Inter Europol Competition Oreca 07-Gibson won the LMP2 class.

Although Esteban Masson set the fastest time in hyperpole, a one-place grid penalty incurred by Louis Rousset in qualifying meant the #29 Forestier Racing by Panis did not start from pole. The #28 IDEC Sport led the field to green instead, and Job van Uitert kept the class lead early on followed by the #30 Duqueine Team. The #4 CrowdStrike Racing by APR started on pole for the Pro-Am class.

The #28 IDEC underwent a driver change to Paul Lafargue, and the #30 Duqueine of Richard Verschoor took the lead before the third hour. The #29 Forestier by Panis overtook the #28 IDEC to take second position. P. J. Hyett in the #99 AO by TF led the Pro-Am class. As Doriane Pin led in the #30, the #3 DKR Engineering suffered a broken suspension and had to pit, losing half an hour. By the fourth hour, Oliver Gray regained second in the #29 Forestier by Panis, but would drop to fifth after a spin by Louis Rousset, allowing the #343 Inter Europol to take second.

Julien Andlauer in the #30 Duqueine gradually built a lead of 91 seconds going into the night, but this was erased by the first safety car intervention. After the restart in hour 9, Andlauer pitted immediately from the lead, but after the pit cycle, retook first position in the hands of Verschoor. The #99 AO by TF led the Pro-Am class and was eleventh in LMP2. After many different pitstop strategies among the teams, the #343 Inter Europol emerged as the leader with Nico Müller driving away from Doriane Pin in the #30 Duqueine.

In hour 14, the #343 Inter Europol of Reshad de Gerus and #30 Duqueine of Julien Andlauer traded places, with the latter coming out on top. The #4 CrowdStrike by APR continued to lead in Pro-Am. The #99 AO by TF of Dane Cameron locked up going into Mulsanne Corner and hit the tire barrier, leading to a slow zone intervention. With 8 hours remaining, the #14 TDS of Kévin Estre went off and got beached at Indianapolis corner while running second in the Pro-Am class. Due to a full-course yellow for debris, Doriane Pin in the #30 Duqueine had to take an emergency service fuel stop, but still led the class. Tom Dillmann in the #43 Inter Europol was shown the black and orange flag due to his right-hand door not shutting, and dropped from second to third. Additionally, Jonas Ried in the #9 Proton Competition ran through an advertising banner at the Dunlop Chicane and suffered damage.

Shortly after Richard Verschoor lost the lead to Reshad de Gerus, the #30 Duqueine was forced to retire with a terminal brake failure in hour 21. Going into the final hour, the #43 Inter Europol led from the #29 Forestier by VPS, who overtook the #343 Inter Europol. The race ended with an Inter Europol 1–2, with Tom Dillmann, Jakub Śmiechowski and Nick Yelloly driving the #43 to victory, ahead of Nico Müller in the #343 and Esteban Masson in the #29 Forestier by VPS, which required a late splash and dash. The #4 CrowdStrike by APR of Laurin Heinrich, George Kurtz and Alex Quinn cruised to victory in LMP2 Pro-Am, beating the #183 AF Corse and #99 AO by TF by over a lap.

=== LMGT3 ===
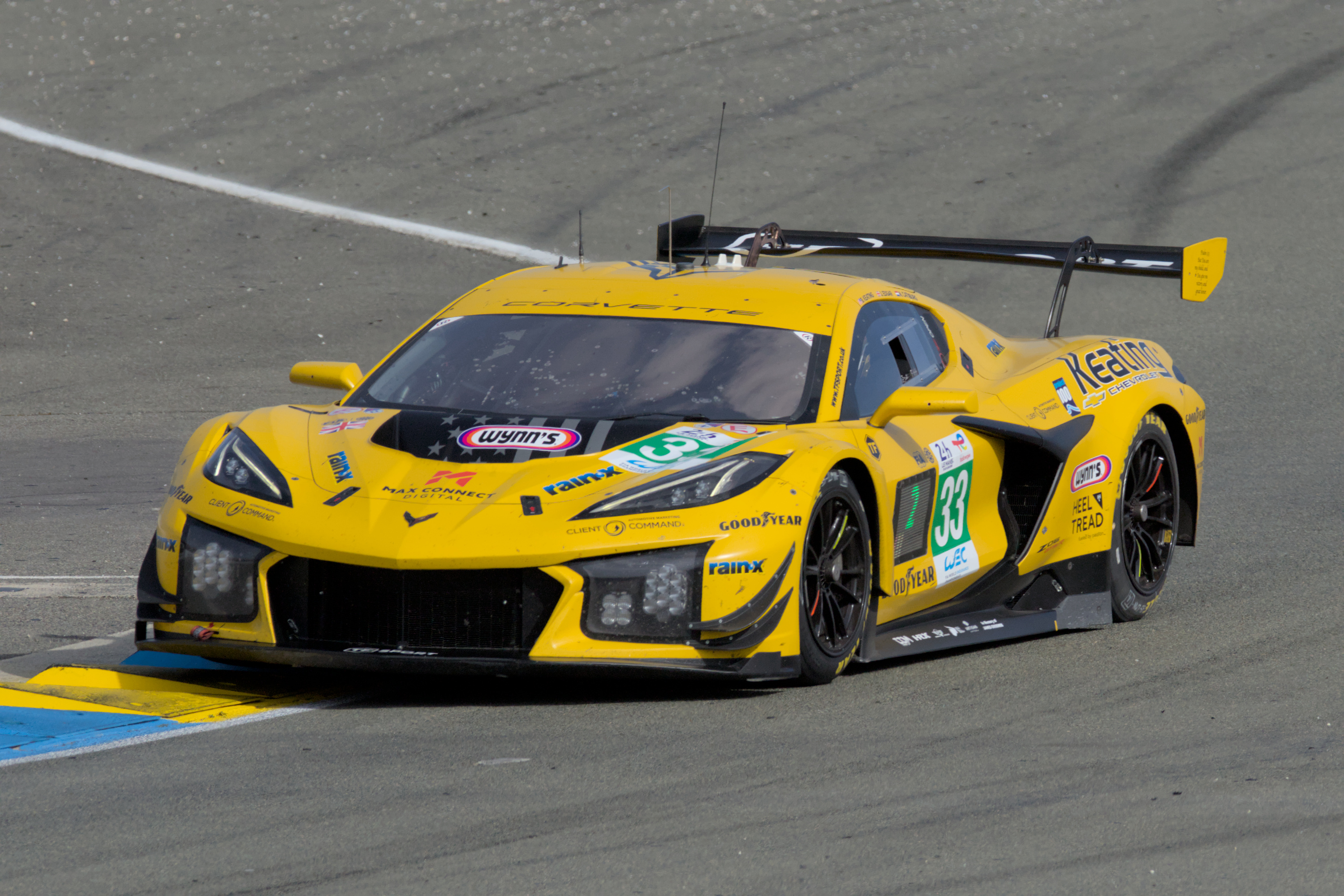
The No. 33 TF Sport Corvette Z06 won the LMGT3 class.

Mattia Drudi started on pole and took the early class lead in the #27 Aston Martin THOR. By the end of the first hour, however, Jack Hawksworth led in the #78 Akkodis ASP Lexus over Ian James who took control of the #27 Aston Martin, with Petru Umbrărescu in the #87 Akkodis ASP Lexus in 3rd. Meanwhile, Martin Berry spun the #61 Iron Lynx Mercedes-AMG, returning to the pits with damage. The #88 Proton Competition Mustang was given a black-and-orange flag for bodywork.

By the 3rd hour, the #91 Manthey Porsche took the lead on an offset strategy, ahead of the #87 Akkodis ASP Lexus and the #21 AF Corse Ferrari. The #13 13 Autosport Corvette suffered a technical issue after contact with a Mercedes-AMG and became the first retirement of the race. The #78 Akkodis ASP took first position before the #91 Manthey Porsche regained the lead after a round of pitstops. The #61 Iron Lynx AMG retired with suspension failure.

After the safety car period ended, the #27 Aston Martin led from the #74 Kessel Racing Ferrari and the #21 AF Corse Ferrari, with the #91 Manthey Porsche falling to 7th following a puncture. In hour 9, the #33 TF Sport Corvette took 2nd position. At the 10-hour mark, the #34 Racing Team Turkey Corvette driven by Charlie Eastwood rose to 2nd place ahead of the #21 Ferrari. The #54 AF Corse Ferrari collided with the #88 Proton Ford and went into the gravel, becoming the third retirement of the race.

In the 11th hour, after fluctuating pit strategies, the #78 and #87 Akkodis ASP Lexuses held a 1–2 with the #33 TF Sport Corvette in 3rd. Halfway through the race, the #79 Iron Lynx retired with engine damage. In the 13th hour, Aston Martins #27 and #23 held a 1–2 with the #33 Corvette in 3rd. Meanwhile, the #2 TF Sport Corvette and #69 Team WRT BMW received drive-through penalties for speeding under the full-course yellow. Then, the #33 Corvette led from two Aston Martins, although the #27 Aston Martin and #74 Ferrari were penalized for speeding in a slow zone. A problem and spin for the #62 Mercedes-AMG forced repairs.

With just less than 6 hours remaining, a steering failure in the #91 Manthey Porsche put Ayhancan Güven in the wall on the exit of the first Mulsanne Chicane from 4th position, causing a safety car. The #23 Aston Martin took the lead, with the #33 Corvette and #78 Lexus behind. With 2 hours remaining, it was the #33 Corvette in the lead followed by the #23 Aston Martin. The polesitter, the #27 Aston Martin, as well as the #69 Team WRT BMW retired both due to gearbox failures.

Jonny Edgar finished the race in the #33 TF Sport Corvette, taking victory alongside Nicky Catsburg and Ben Keating, ahead of the #78 Akkodis ASP Lexus of Jack Hawksworth. Eduardo Barrichello brought the #23 Heart of Racing Aston Martin home to take third place, fending off the #87 Lexus of José María López.

== Post-race ==
Toyota Racing secured its sixth overall 24 Hours of Le Mans victory with the #7 entry of Mike Conway, Kamui Kobayashi and Nyck de Vries, who completed 381 laps in 24:03:01.030. It was the second overall win for Conway and Kobayashi, having already won the 2021 edition, and the first for De Vries. It was Toyota's first win since 2022, ending a three-year streak for the Ferrari 499P. BMW M Team WRT finished second with the #20 car driven by Robin Frijns, René Rast and Sheldon van der Linde.

Genesis Magma Racing completed its 24 Hours of Le Mans debut with its #19 car finishing 13th overall, becoming the first South Korean manufacturer team to complete the race; the #17 sister car retired in the 17th hour following a suspension failure. Hyundai Motor CEO Jose Munoz commented that the event "demonstrates the quality and durability of Genesis while helping the company understand future technological development directions." Hyundai Motor Group Executive Chair Euisun Chung visited the venue to encourage the team during the race weekend.

== Results ==
The minimum number of laps for classification (70 percent of the overall race winner's distance) was 266 laps. Class winners are denoted in bold and ‡.

Final race classification
Pos	Class	No.	Team	Drivers	Chassis	Tyre	Laps	Time/Reason
Pos	Class	No.	Team	Drivers	Engine	Tyre	Laps	Time/Reason
1	**Hypercar**	**7**	**(Japan) Toyota Racing**	**(United Kingdom) Mike Conway (Japan) Kamui Kobayashi (Netherlands) Nyck de Vries**	**Toyota TR010 Hybrid**	M	**381**	**24:03:01.030‡**
1	**Hypercar**	**7**	**(Japan) Toyota Racing**	**(United Kingdom) Mike Conway (Japan) Kamui Kobayashi (Netherlands) Nyck de Vries**	**Toyota H8909 3.5 L Turbo V6**	M	**381**	**24:03:01.030‡**
2	Hypercar	20	(Germany) BMW M Team WRT	(Netherlands) Robin Frijns (Germany) René Rast (South Africa) Sheldon van der Linde	BMW M Hybrid V8	M	381	+10.913
2	Hypercar	20	(Germany) BMW M Team WRT	(Netherlands) Robin Frijns (Germany) René Rast (South Africa) Sheldon van der Linde	BMW P66/3 4.0 L Turbo V8	M	381	+10.913
3	Hypercar	8	(Japan) Toyota Racing	(Switzerland) Sébastien Buemi (New Zealand) Brendon Hartley (Japan) Ryō Hirakawa	Toyota TR010 Hybrid	M	381	+20.417
3	Hypercar	8	(Japan) Toyota Racing	(Switzerland) Sébastien Buemi (New Zealand) Brendon Hartley (Japan) Ryō Hirakawa	Toyota H8909 3.5 L Turbo V6	M	381	+20.417
4	Hypercar	12	(United States) Cadillac Hertz Team Jota	(Switzerland) Louis Delétraz (France) Norman Nato (United Kingdom) Will Stevens	Cadillac V-Series.R	M	381	+32.381
4	Hypercar	12	(United States) Cadillac Hertz Team Jota	(Switzerland) Louis Delétraz (France) Norman Nato (United Kingdom) Will Stevens	Cadillac LMC55R 5.5 L V8	M	381	+32.381
5	Hypercar	51	(Italy) Ferrari AF Corse	(United Kingdom) James Calado (Italy) Antonio Giovinazzi (Italy) Alessandro Pier Guidi	Ferrari 499P	M	381	+2:22.423
5	Hypercar	51	(Italy) Ferrari AF Corse	(United Kingdom) James Calado (Italy) Antonio Giovinazzi (Italy) Alessandro Pier Guidi	Ferrari F163CG 3.0 L Turbo V6	M	381	+2:22.423
6	Hypercar	35	(France) Alpine Endurance Team	(Portugal) António Félix da Costa (Austria) Ferdinand Habsburg (France) Charles Milesi	Alpine A424	M	381	+2:30.205
6	Hypercar	35	(France) Alpine Endurance Team	(Portugal) António Félix da Costa (Austria) Ferdinand Habsburg (France) Charles Milesi	Alpine V634 3.4 L Turbo V6	M	381	+2:30.205
7	Hypercar	83	(Italy) AF Corse	(United Kingdom) Phil Hanson (Poland) Robert Kubica (China) Yifei Ye	Ferrari 499P	M	381	+2:35.573
7	Hypercar	83	(Italy) AF Corse	(United Kingdom) Phil Hanson (Poland) Robert Kubica (China) Yifei Ye	Ferrari F163CG 3.0 L Turbo V6	M	381	+2:35.573
8	Hypercar	007	(United States) Aston Martin THOR Team	(United Kingdom) Tom Gamble (United Kingdom) Ross Gunn (United Kingdom) Harry Tincknell	Aston Martin Valkyrie	M	379	+2 Laps
8	Hypercar	007	(United States) Aston Martin THOR Team	(United Kingdom) Tom Gamble (United Kingdom) Ross Gunn (United Kingdom) Harry Tincknell	Aston Martin RA 6.5 L V12	M	379	+2 Laps
9	Hypercar	101	(United States) Cadillac WTR	(Portugal) Filipe Albuquerque (United States) Jordan Taylor (United States) Ricky Taylor	Cadillac V-Series.R	M	379	+2 Laps
9	Hypercar	101	(United States) Cadillac WTR	(Portugal) Filipe Albuquerque (United States) Jordan Taylor (United States) Ricky Taylor	Cadillac LMC55R 5.5 L V8	M	379	+2 Laps
10	Hypercar	36	(France) Alpine Endurance Team	(France) Jules Gounon (France) Frédéric Makowiecki (France) Victor Martins	Alpine A424	M	379	+2 Laps
10	Hypercar	36	(France) Alpine Endurance Team	(France) Jules Gounon (France) Frédéric Makowiecki (France) Victor Martins	Alpine V634 3.4 L Turbo V6	M	379	+2 Laps
11	Hypercar	94	(France) Peugeot TotalEnergies	(France) Loïc Duval (Denmark) Malthe Jakobsen (France) Théo Pourchaire	Peugeot 9X8	M	377	+4 Laps
11	Hypercar	94	(France) Peugeot TotalEnergies	(France) Loïc Duval (Denmark) Malthe Jakobsen (France) Théo Pourchaire	Peugeot X6H 2.6 L Turbo V6	M	377	+4 Laps
12	Hypercar	93	(France) Peugeot TotalEnergies	(New Zealand) Nick Cassidy (United Kingdom) Paul di Resta (Belgium) Stoffel Vandoorne	Peugeot 9X8	M	376	+5 Laps
12	Hypercar	93	(France) Peugeot TotalEnergies	(New Zealand) Nick Cassidy (United Kingdom) Paul di Resta (Belgium) Stoffel Vandoorne	Peugeot X6H 2.6 L Turbo V6	M	376	+5 Laps
13	Hypercar	19	(South Korea) Genesis Magma Racing	(France) Paul-Loup Chatin (France) Mathieu Jaminet (Spain) Daniel Juncadella	Genesis GMR-001	M	372	+9 Laps
13	Hypercar	19	(South Korea) Genesis Magma Racing	(France) Paul-Loup Chatin (France) Mathieu Jaminet (Spain) Daniel Juncadella	Genesis G8MR 3.2 L Turbo V8	M	372	+9 Laps
14	Hypercar	009	(United States) Aston Martin THOR Team	(Canada) Roman De Angelis (Spain) Alex Riberas (Denmark) Marco Sørensen	Aston Martin Valkyrie	M	372	+9 Laps
14	Hypercar	009	(United States) Aston Martin THOR Team	(Canada) Roman De Angelis (Spain) Alex Riberas (Denmark) Marco Sørensen	Aston Martin RA 6.5 L V12	M	372	+9 Laps
15	**LMP2**	**43**	**(Poland) Inter Europol Competition**	**(France) Tom Dillmann (Poland) Jakub Śmiechowski (United Kingdom) Nick Yelloly**	**Oreca 07**	G	**361**	**+20 Laps‡**
15	**LMP2**	**43**	**(Poland) Inter Europol Competition**	**(France) Tom Dillmann (Poland) Jakub Śmiechowski (United Kingdom) Nick Yelloly**	**Gibson GK428 4.2 L V8**	G	**361**	**+20 Laps‡**
16	LMP2	343	(Poland) Inter Europol Competition	(France) Reshad de Gerus (United States) Bijoy Garg (Switzerland) Nico Müller	Oreca 07	G	360	+21 Laps
16	LMP2	343	(Poland) Inter Europol Competition	(France) Reshad de Gerus (United States) Bijoy Garg (Switzerland) Nico Müller	Gibson GK428 4.2 L V8	G	360	+21 Laps
17	LMP2	29	(France) Forestier Racing by Panis	(United Kingdom) Oliver Gray (France) Esteban Masson (France) Louis Rousset	Oreca 07	G	360	+21 Laps
17	LMP2	29	(France) Forestier Racing by Panis	(United Kingdom) Oliver Gray (France) Esteban Masson (France) Louis Rousset	Gibson GK428 4.2 L V8	G	360	+21 Laps
18	LMP2	26	(United Kingdom) Vector Sport	(Republic of Ireland) Ryan Cullen (Brazil) Pietro Fittipaldi (Grenada) Vladislav Lomko	Oreca 07	G	360	+21 Laps
18	LMP2	26	(United Kingdom) Vector Sport	(Republic of Ireland) Ryan Cullen (Brazil) Pietro Fittipaldi (Grenada) Vladislav Lomko	Gibson GK428 4.2 L V8	G	360	+21 Laps
19	LMP2	37	(Switzerland) CLX Motorsport	(Mexico) Ian Aguilera (France) Adrien Closmenil (Denmark) Theodor Jensen	Oreca 07	G	360	+21 Laps
19	LMP2	37	(Switzerland) CLX Motorsport	(Mexico) Ian Aguilera (France) Adrien Closmenil (Denmark) Theodor Jensen	Gibson GK428 4.2 L V8	G	360	+21 Laps
20	LMP2	28	(France) IDEC Sport	(France) Paul Lafargue (Italy) Valerio Rinicella (Netherlands) Job van Uitert	Oreca 07	G	359	+22 Laps
20	LMP2	28	(France) IDEC Sport	(France) Paul Lafargue (Italy) Valerio Rinicella (Netherlands) Job van Uitert	Gibson GK428 4.2 L V8	G	359	+22 Laps
21	**LMP2 (Pro-Am)**	**4**	**(United States) CrowdStrike Racing by APR**	**(Germany) Laurin Heinrich (United States) George Kurtz (United Kingdom) Alex Quinn**	**Oreca 07**	G	**358**	**+23 Laps‡**
21	**LMP2 (Pro-Am)**	**4**	**(United States) CrowdStrike Racing by APR**	**(Germany) Laurin Heinrich (United States) George Kurtz (United Kingdom) Alex Quinn**	**Gibson GK428 4.2 L V8**	G	**358**	**+23 Laps‡**
22	LMP2	22	(United Kingdom) United Autosports	(Denmark) Mikkel Jensen (Sweden) Rasmus Lindh (Switzerland) Grégoire Saucy	Oreca 07	G	358	+23 Laps
22	LMP2	22	(United Kingdom) United Autosports	(Denmark) Mikkel Jensen (Sweden) Rasmus Lindh (Switzerland) Grégoire Saucy	Gibson GK428 4.2 L V8	G	358	+23 Laps
23	LMP2 (Pro-Am)	183	(Italy) AF Corse	(United Kingdom) Ben Barnicoat (France) François Perrodo (France) Matthieu Vaxivière	Oreca 07	G	357	+24 Laps
23	LMP2 (Pro-Am)	183	(Italy) AF Corse	(United Kingdom) Ben Barnicoat (France) François Perrodo (France) Matthieu Vaxivière	Gibson GK428 4.2 L V8	G	357	+24 Laps
24	LMP2 (Pro-Am)	99	(United States) AO by TF	(Australia) James Allen (United States) Dane Cameron (United States) P. J. Hyett	Oreca 07	G	356	+25 Laps
24	LMP2 (Pro-Am)	99	(United States) AO by TF	(Australia) James Allen (United States) Dane Cameron (United States) P. J. Hyett	Gibson GK428 4.2 L V8	G	356	+25 Laps
25	LMP2	9	(Germany) Proton Competition	(United Kingdom) Harry King (Japan) Kakunoshin Ohta (Germany) Jonas Ried	Oreca 07	G	356	+25 Laps
25	LMP2	9	(Germany) Proton Competition	(United Kingdom) Harry King (Japan) Kakunoshin Ohta (Germany) Jonas Ried	Gibson GK428 4.2 L V8	G	356	+25 Laps
26	LMP2 (Pro-Am)	25	(Portugal) Algarve Pro Racing	(United Kingdom) Jake Hughes (Denmark) Michael Jensen (Italy) Enzo Trulli	Oreca 07	G	356	+25 Laps
26	LMP2 (Pro-Am)	25	(Portugal) Algarve Pro Racing	(United Kingdom) Jake Hughes (Denmark) Michael Jensen (Italy) Enzo Trulli	Gibson GK428 4.2 L V8	G	356	+25 Laps
27	LMP2 (Pro-Am)	14	(France) TDS Racing	(Switzerland) Mathias Beche (France) Kévin Estre (Canada) Tobias Lütke	Oreca 07	G	355	+26 Laps
27	LMP2 (Pro-Am)	14	(France) TDS Racing	(Switzerland) Mathias Beche (France) Kévin Estre (Canada) Tobias Lütke	Gibson GK428 4.2 L V8	G	355	+26 Laps
28	LMP2 (Pro-Am)	44	(Germany) Proton Competition	(Austria) Horst Felbermayr Jr. (Austria) Horst Felix Felbermayr (Spain) Lorenzo Fluxá	Oreca 07	G	354	+27 Laps
28	LMP2 (Pro-Am)	44	(Germany) Proton Competition	(Austria) Horst Felbermayr Jr. (Austria) Horst Felix Felbermayr (Spain) Lorenzo Fluxá	Gibson GK428 4.2 L V8	G	354	+27 Laps
29	LMP2 (Pro-Am)	222	(United Kingdom) United Autosports	(United Kingdom) Ben Hanley (United Kingdom) Oliver Jarvis (Brazil) Daniel Schneider	Oreca 07	G	354	+27 Laps
29	LMP2 (Pro-Am)	222	(United Kingdom) United Autosports	(United Kingdom) Ben Hanley (United Kingdom) Oliver Jarvis (Brazil) Daniel Schneider	Gibson GK428 4.2 L V8	G	354	+27 Laps
30	LMP2 (Pro-Am)	48	(France) RD Limited	(France) Romain Dumas (United States) Fred Poordad (France) Tristan Vautier	Oreca 07	G	353	+28 Laps
30	LMP2 (Pro-Am)	48	(France) RD Limited	(France) Romain Dumas (United States) Fred Poordad (France) Tristan Vautier	Gibson GK428 4.2 L V8	G	353	+28 Laps
31	LMP2 (Pro-Am)	3	(Luxembourg) DKR Engineering	(Mexico) Sebastián Álvarez (Canada) John Farano (Netherlands) Renger van der Zande	Oreca 07	G	344	+37 Laps
31	LMP2 (Pro-Am)	3	(Luxembourg) DKR Engineering	(Mexico) Sebastián Álvarez (Canada) John Farano (Netherlands) Renger van der Zande	Gibson GK428 4.2 L V8	G	344	+37 Laps
32	LMP2	24	(United Kingdom) Nielsen Racing	(Australia) Jack Doohan (Denmark) David Heinemeier Hansson (United Kingdom) Edward Pearson	Oreca 07	G	341	+40 Laps
32	LMP2	24	(United Kingdom) Nielsen Racing	(Australia) Jack Doohan (Denmark) David Heinemeier Hansson (United Kingdom) Edward Pearson	Gibson GK428 4.2 L V8	G	341	+40 Laps
33	**LMGT3**	**33**	**(United Kingdom) TF Sport**	**(Netherlands) Nicky Catsburg (United Kingdom) Jonny Edgar (United States) Ben Keating**	**Chevrolet Corvette Z06 GT3.R**	G	**336**	**+45 Laps‡**
33	**LMGT3**	**33**	**(United Kingdom) TF Sport**	**(Netherlands) Nicky Catsburg (United Kingdom) Jonny Edgar (United States) Ben Keating**	**Chevrolet LT6.R 5.5 L V8**	G	**336**	**+45 Laps‡**
34	LMGT3	78	(France) Akkodis ASP Team	(France) Hadrien David (United Kingdom) Jack Hawksworth (Belgium) Tom Van Rompuy	Lexus RC F GT3	G	335	+46 Laps
34	LMGT3	78	(France) Akkodis ASP Team	(France) Hadrien David (United Kingdom) Jack Hawksworth (Belgium) Tom Van Rompuy	Lexus 2UR-GSE 5.4 L V8	G	335	+46 Laps
35	LMGT3	23	(United States) Heart of Racing Team	(United Kingdom) Jonny Adam (Brazil) Eduardo Barrichello (United States) Gray Newell	Aston Martin Vantage AMR GT3 Evo	G	335	+46 Laps
35	LMGT3	23	(United States) Heart of Racing Team	(United Kingdom) Jonny Adam (Brazil) Eduardo Barrichello (United States) Gray Newell	Aston Martin M177 4.0 L Turbo V8	G	335	+46 Laps
36	LMGT3	87	(France) Akkodis ASP Team	(Argentina) José María López (Austria) Clemens Schmid (Romania) Petru Umbrărescu	Lexus RC F GT3	G	335	+46 Laps
36	LMGT3	87	(France) Akkodis ASP Team	(Argentina) José María López (Austria) Clemens Schmid (Romania) Petru Umbrărescu	Lexus 2UR-GSE 5.4 L V8	G	335	+46 Laps
37	LMGT3	21	(Italy) Vista AF Corse	(France) François Hériau (United States) Simon Mann (Italy) Alessio Rovera	Ferrari 296 GT3 Evo	G	335	+46 Laps
37	LMGT3	21	(Italy) Vista AF Corse	(France) François Hériau (United States) Simon Mann (Italy) Alessio Rovera	Ferrari F163CE 3.0 L Turbo V6	G	335	+46 Laps
38	LMGT3	34	Racing Team Turkey by TF	(Republic of Ireland) Peter Dempsey (Republic of Ireland) Charlie Eastwood (Turkey) Salih Yoluç	Chevrolet Corvette Z06 GT3.R	G	335	+46 Laps
38	LMGT3	34	Racing Team Turkey by TF	(Republic of Ireland) Peter Dempsey (Republic of Ireland) Charlie Eastwood (Turkey) Salih Yoluç	Chevrolet LT6.R 5.5 L V8	G	335	+46 Laps
39	LMGT3	32	(Belgium) Team WRT	(Brazil) Augusto Farfus (Indonesia) Sean Gelael (United Kingdom) Darren Leung	BMW M4 GT3 Evo	G	334	+47 Laps
39	LMGT3	32	(Belgium) Team WRT	(Brazil) Augusto Farfus (Indonesia) Sean Gelael (United Kingdom) Darren Leung	BMW P58 3.0 L Turbo I6	G	334	+47 Laps
40	LMGT3	150	(Italy) Richard Mille AF Corse	(Italy) Riccardo Agostini (Brazil) Custodio Toledo (France) Lilou Wadoux	Ferrari 296 GT3 Evo	G	334	+47 Laps
40	LMGT3	150	(Italy) Richard Mille AF Corse	(Italy) Riccardo Agostini (Brazil) Custodio Toledo (France) Lilou Wadoux	Ferrari F163CE 3.0 L Turbo V6	G	334	+47 Laps
41	LMGT3	74	(Switzerland) Kessel Racing	(United States) Dustin Blattner (Germany) Dennis Marschall (Italy) Lorenzo Patrese	Ferrari 296 GT3 Evo	G	334	+47 Laps
41	LMGT3	74	(Switzerland) Kessel Racing	(United States) Dustin Blattner (Germany) Dennis Marschall (Italy) Lorenzo Patrese	Ferrari F163CE 3.0 L Turbo V6	G	334	+47 Laps
42	LMGT3	57	(Switzerland) Kessel Racing	(Denmark) Conrad Laursen (Japan) Takeshi Kimura (Brazil) Daniel Serra	Ferrari 296 GT3 Evo	G	334	+47 Laps
42	LMGT3	57	(Switzerland) Kessel Racing	(Denmark) Conrad Laursen (Japan) Takeshi Kimura (Brazil) Daniel Serra	Ferrari F163CE 3.0 L Turbo V6	G	334	+47 Laps
43	LMGT3	59	(France) Racing Spirit of Léman	(France) Marius Fossard (France) Valentin Hasse-Clot (France) Clément Mateu	Aston Martin Vantage AMR GT3 Evo	G	332	+49 Laps
43	LMGT3	59	(France) Racing Spirit of Léman	(France) Marius Fossard (France) Valentin Hasse-Clot (France) Clément Mateu	Aston Martin M177 4.0 L Turbo V8	G	332	+49 Laps
44	LMGT3	10	(United Kingdom) Garage 59	(Hong Kong) Antares Au (United Kingdom) Tom Fleming (Germany) Marvin Kirchhöfer	McLaren 720S GT3 Evo	G	332	+49 Laps
44	LMGT3	10	(United Kingdom) Garage 59	(Hong Kong) Antares Au (United Kingdom) Tom Fleming (Germany) Marvin Kirchhöfer	McLaren M840T 4.0 L Turbo V8	G	332	+49 Laps
45	LMGT3	92	(Germany) The Bend Manthey	(Austria) Richard Lietz (Italy) Riccardo Pera (Australia) Yasser Shahin	Porsche 911 GT3 R (992.2)	G	330	+51 Laps
45	LMGT3	92	(Germany) The Bend Manthey	(Austria) Richard Lietz (Italy) Riccardo Pera (Australia) Yasser Shahin	Porsche M97/80 4.2 L Flat-6	G	330	+51 Laps
46	LMGT3	2	(United Kingdom) TF Sport	(United Kingdom) Ben Green (United Kingdom) Lorcan Hanafin (Malaysia) Prince Jefri Ibrahim	Chevrolet Corvette Z06 GT3.R	G	330	+51 Laps
46	LMGT3	2	(United Kingdom) TF Sport	(United Kingdom) Ben Green (United Kingdom) Lorcan Hanafin (Malaysia) Prince Jefri Ibrahim	Chevrolet LT6.R 5.5 L V8	G	330	+51 Laps
47	LMGT3	58	(United Kingdom) Garage 59	(Germany) Finn Gehrsitz (Germany) Benjamin Goethe (Sweden) Alexander West	McLaren 720S GT3 Evo	G	329	+52 Laps
47	LMGT3	58	(United Kingdom) Garage 59	(Germany) Finn Gehrsitz (Germany) Benjamin Goethe (Sweden) Alexander West	McLaren M840T 4.0 L Turbo V8	G	329	+52 Laps
48	LMGT3	62	Team Qatar by Iron Lynx	(Qatar) Abdulla Al-Khelaifi (France) Giuliano Alesi (Germany) Julian Hanses	Mercedes-AMG GT3 Evo	G	324	+57 Laps
48	LMGT3	62	Team Qatar by Iron Lynx	(Qatar) Abdulla Al-Khelaifi (France) Giuliano Alesi (Germany) Julian Hanses	Mercedes-AMG M159 6.2 L V8	G	324	+57 Laps
49	LMGT3	88	(Germany) Proton Competition	(Italy) Stefano Gattuso (Italy) Giammarco Levorato (United States) Logan Sargeant	Ford Mustang GT3 Evo	G	323	+58 Laps
49	LMGT3	88	(Germany) Proton Competition	(Italy) Stefano Gattuso (Italy) Giammarco Levorato (United States) Logan Sargeant	Ford Coyote 5.4 L V8	G	323	+58 Laps
DNF	LMP2	30	(France) Duqueine Team	(France) Julien Andlauer (France) Doriane Pin (Netherlands) Richard Verschoor	Oreca 07	G	307	Brakes
DNF	LMP2	30	(France) Duqueine Team	(France) Julien Andlauer (France) Doriane Pin (Netherlands) Richard Verschoor	Gibson GK428 4.2 L V8	G	307	Brakes
DNF	LMGT3	27	(United States) Heart of Racing Team	(Italy) Mattia Drudi (United Kingdom) Ian James (Canada) Zacharie Robichon	Aston Martin Vantage AMR GT3 Evo	G	291	Gearbox
DNF	LMGT3	27	(United States) Heart of Racing Team	(Italy) Mattia Drudi (United Kingdom) Ian James (Canada) Zacharie Robichon	Aston Martin M177 4.0 L Turbo V8	G	291	Gearbox
DNF	LMGT3	69	(Belgium) Team WRT	(United Kingdom) Dan Harper (United States) Anthony McIntosh (Canada) Parker Thompson	BMW M4 GT3 Evo	G	291	Gearbox
DNF	LMGT3	69	(Belgium) Team WRT	(United Kingdom) Dan Harper (United States) Anthony McIntosh (Canada) Parker Thompson	BMW P58 3.0 L Turbo I6	G	291	Gearbox
DNF	Hypercar	50	(Italy) Ferrari AF Corse	(Italy) Antonio Fuoco (Spain) Miguel Molina (Denmark) Nicklas Nielsen	Ferrari 499P	M	284	Mechanical
DNF	Hypercar	50	(Italy) Ferrari AF Corse	(Italy) Antonio Fuoco (Spain) Miguel Molina (Denmark) Nicklas Nielsen	Ferrari F163CG 3.0 L Turbo V6	M	284	Mechanical
DNF	Hypercar	15	(Germany) BMW M Team WRT	(Denmark) Kevin Magnussen (Switzerland) Raffaele Marciello (Belgium) Dries Vanthoor	BMW M Hybrid V8	M	272	Collision damage
DNF	Hypercar	15	(Germany) BMW M Team WRT	(Denmark) Kevin Magnussen (Switzerland) Raffaele Marciello (Belgium) Dries Vanthoor	BMW P66/3 4.0 L Turbo V8	M	272	Collision damage
DNF	Hypercar	17	(South Korea) Genesis Magma Racing	(Brazil) Pipo Derani (France) Mathys Jaubert (Germany) André Lotterer	Genesis GMR-001	M	263	Suspension
DNF	Hypercar	17	(South Korea) Genesis Magma Racing	(Brazil) Pipo Derani (France) Mathys Jaubert (Germany) André Lotterer	Genesis G8MR 3.2 L Turbo V8	M	263	Suspension
DNF	LMGT3	91	(Germany) Manthey DK Engineering	Timur Boguslavskiy (United Kingdom) James Cottingham (Turkey) Ayhancan Güven	Porsche 911 GT3 R (992.2)	G	254	Accident
DNF	LMGT3	91	(Germany) Manthey DK Engineering	Timur Boguslavskiy (United Kingdom) James Cottingham (Turkey) Ayhancan Güven	Porsche M97/80 4.2 L Flat-6	G	254	Accident
DNF	LMGT3	77	(Germany) Proton Competition	(United States) Eric Powell (United Kingdom) Sebastian Priaulx (United Kingdom) Ben Tuck	Ford Mustang GT3 Evo	G	244	Mechanical
DNF	LMGT3	77	(Germany) Proton Competition	(United States) Eric Powell (United Kingdom) Sebastian Priaulx (United Kingdom) Ben Tuck	Ford Coyote 5.4 L V8	G	244	Mechanical
DNF	Hypercar	38	(United States) Cadillac Hertz Team Jota	(United Kingdom) Jack Aitken (New Zealand) Earl Bamber (France) Sébastien Bourdais	Cadillac V-Series.R	M	218	Power steering
DNF	Hypercar	38	(United States) Cadillac Hertz Team Jota	(United Kingdom) Jack Aitken (New Zealand) Earl Bamber (France) Sébastien Bourdais	Cadillac LMC55R 5.5 L V8	M	218	Power steering
DNF	LMGT3	79	(Italy) Iron Lynx	(Italy) Matteo Cressoni (Netherlands) Lin Hodenius (Italy) Johannes Zelger	Mercedes-AMG GT3 Evo	G	153	Crack in engine
DNF	LMGT3	79	(Italy) Iron Lynx	(Italy) Matteo Cressoni (Netherlands) Lin Hodenius (Italy) Johannes Zelger	Mercedes-AMG M159 6.2 L V8	G	153	Crack in engine
DNF	LMGT3	54	(Italy) Vista AF Corse	(Italy) Francesco Castellacci (Switzerland) Thomas Flohr (Italy) Davide Rigon	Ferrari 296 GT3 Evo	G	110	Collision
DNF	LMGT3	54	(Italy) Vista AF Corse	(Italy) Francesco Castellacci (Switzerland) Thomas Flohr (Italy) Davide Rigon	Ferrari F163CE 3.0 L Turbo V6	G	110	Collision
DNF	LMGT3	61	(Italy) Iron Lynx	(Angola) Rui Andrade (Australia) Martin Berry (Belgium) Maxime Martin	Mercedes-AMG GT3 Evo	G	65	Suspension
DNF	LMGT3	61	(Italy) Iron Lynx	(Angola) Rui Andrade (Australia) Martin Berry (Belgium) Maxime Martin	Mercedes-AMG M159 6.2 L V8	G	65	Suspension
DNF	LMGT3	13	(Canada) 13 Autosport	(United Kingdom) Matt Bell (Canada) Orey Fidani (Germany) Lars Kern	Chevrolet Corvette Z06 GT3.R	G	61	Sensor
DNF	LMGT3	13	(Canada) 13 Autosport	(United Kingdom) Matt Bell (Canada) Orey Fidani (Germany) Lars Kern	Chevrolet LT6.R 5.5 L V8	G	61	Sensor
Official results:

== See also ==
- 2026 Road to Le Mans

== Notes ==
FIA World Endurance Championship
Previous race: 6 Hours of Spa-Francorchamps	2026 season	Next race: 6 Hours of São Paulo
