= Louis Rousset =

French racing driver (born 1999)

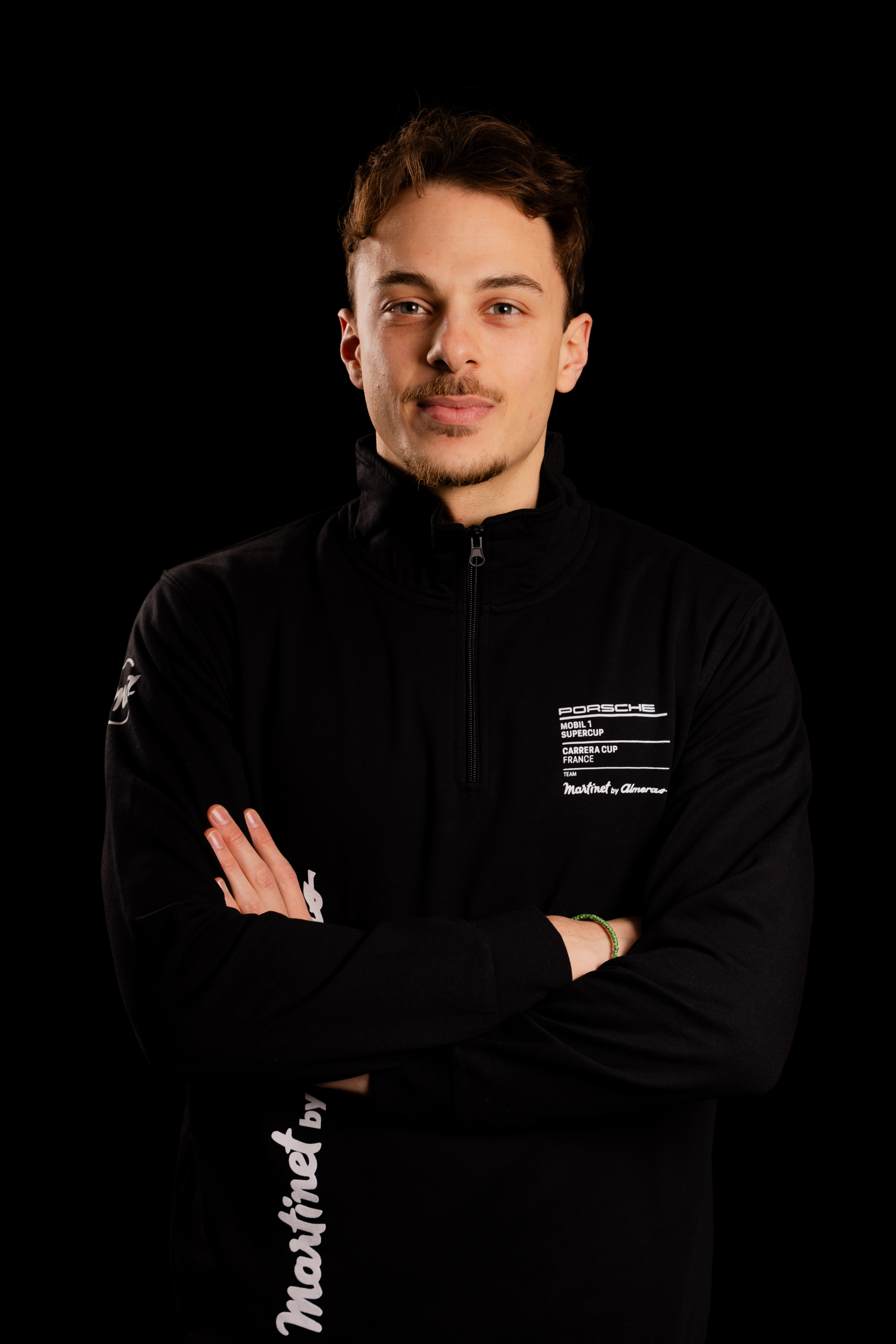
- Rousset in 2024
- Nationality: (France) French
- Born: 25 January 1999 (age 27) Saint-Maurice, Val-de-Marne, France
- Categorisation: FIA Bronze (2018); FIA Silver (2019–)

Championship titles
- 2021: Trophée MitJet 2L France

Louis Rousset (born 25 January 1999) is a French racing driver who competes in the LMP2 class of the European Le Mans Series for Forestier Racing by Panis.

== Career ==
Rousset made his car racing debut in the Électrique class of the 2016–17 Andros Trophy in ice racing, having won the eVolant Andros in late 2016. Upon winning the shootout, Rousset began receiving financial backing from Yves Forestier, CEO of the Petit Forestier group, becoming his main sponsor as he began sporting liveries primarily featuring the refrigerated vehicle rental company. Racing in the Andros Trophy for four of the next five seasons, Rousset scored a handful of Elite class wins before prioritising circuit racing from 2022 onwards.

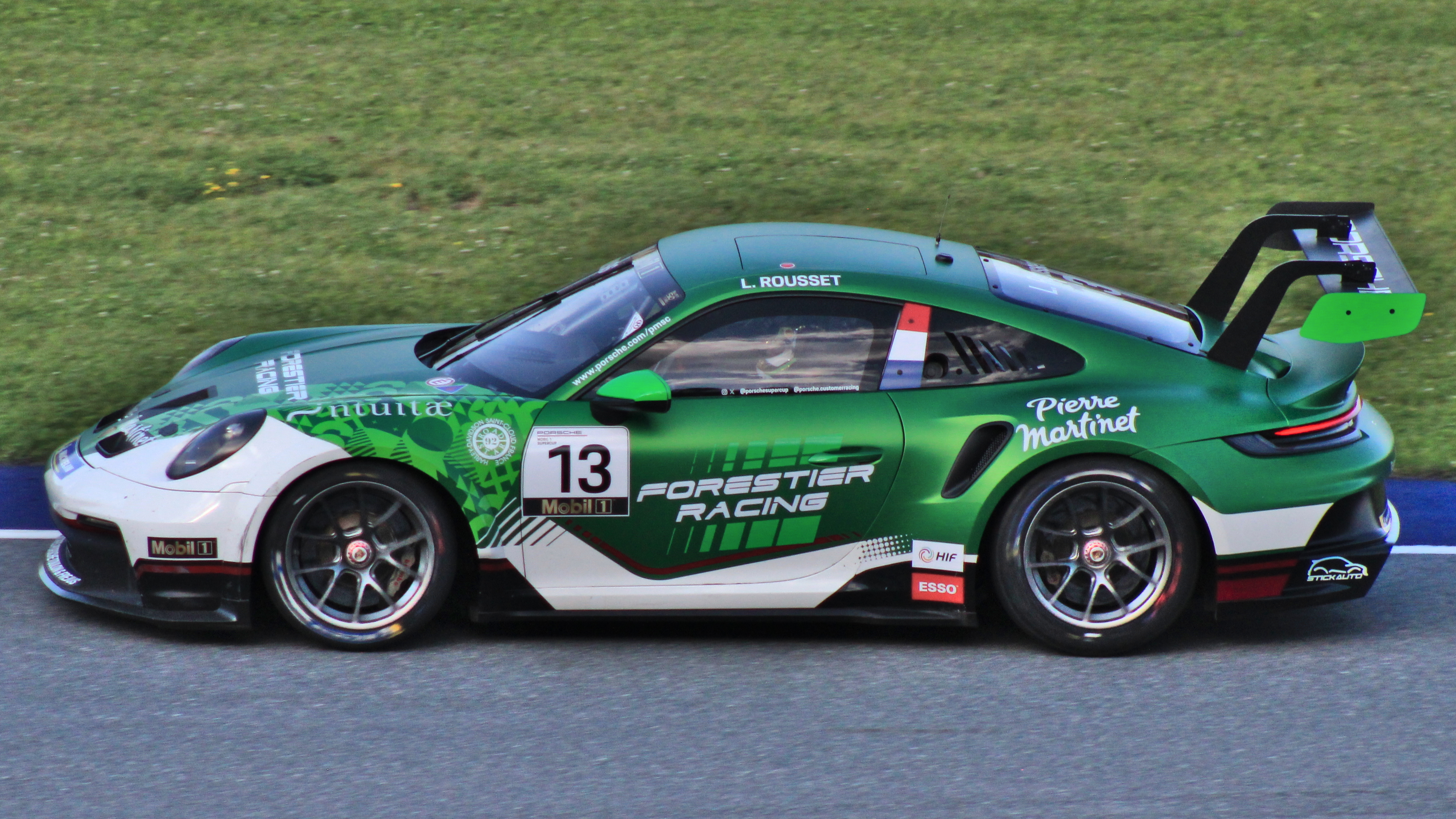
Rousset driving in Porsche Supercup at the Red Bull Ring in 2024.

Amid his time in the Andros Trophy, Rousset made his circuit racing debut at the Dijon round of the 2018 French GT4 Cup for Ginetta-linked CMR. Three years later, Rousset joined Matthieu Vaxivière and Aurélien Panis' VPS Racing squad to compete in the Trophée MitJet 2L France, winning 15 of the 24 races to secure his first title in racing. Stepping up to LMP3 competition for 2022, Rousset joined MV2S Forestier Racing to race in the Le Mans Cup alongside Jérôme de Sadeleer. In his first season in the series, Rousset took a pair of second-place finishes at Le Castellet and Monza en route to a fifth-place points finish. During 2022, Rousset also made a one-off appearance in the LMP3 class of the European Le Mans Series at Barcelona for EuroInternational.

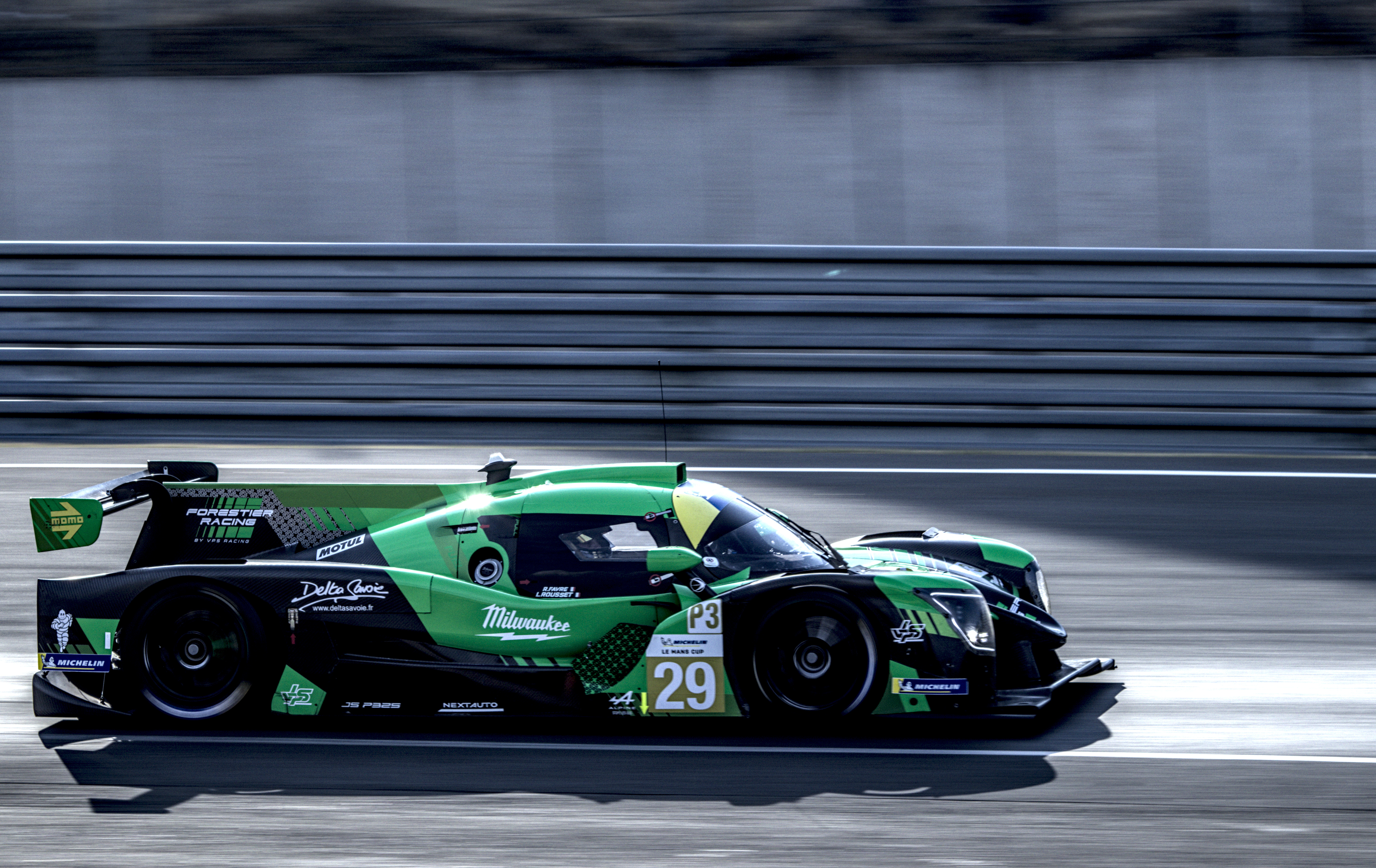
Rousset racing for Forestier Racing by VPS in LMP3 at the 2025 Road to Le Mans.

Two seasons in Porsche Carrera Cup France then ensued, finishing eighth for CLRT in 2023 and ninth for Martinet by Alméras in 2024, a year that also saw Rousset take on a full season of Porsche Supercup. Rousset then returned to LMP3 racing in 2025, racing for Forestier Racing by VPS in the Le Mans Cup. Partnering Romain Favre, he scored a pair of second-place finishes at Silverstone and Algarve, as well as third place at Barcelona on his way to third in the standings.

Rousset graduated to LMP2 competition in 2026, joining reigning champions Forestier Racing by Panis for his rookie season in the European Le Mans Series. In his debut race at Barcelona, Rousset incurred three penalties, but managed to win overall after a late charge by teammate Esteban Masson. After that, Rousset won at Imola and finished second at Spa to clinch runner-up honours in points. During 2026, Rousset also competed at the 24 Hours of Le Mans with his ELMS teammates, finishing third in LMP2 on his debut at the French enduro.

== Racing record ==
=== Racing career summary ===
Season	Series	Team	Races	Wins	Poles	F/Laps	Podiums	Points	Position
2016–17	Andros Trophy – Électrique		8	0	0	0	0	79	10th
2017–18	Andros Trophy – Électrique		26	0	0	0	0	232	8th
2018	French GT4 Cup – Am	CMR	2	0	0	0	0	0	NC
2018–19	Andros Trophy – Électrique		22	0	0	0	5	240	4th
2019–20	Andros Trophy	Sébastien Loeb Racing							
2021	Trophée MitJet 2L France	VPS Racing	24	15				415	**1st**
2021–22	Andros Trophy								
2022	Le Mans Cup – LMP3	MV2S Forestier Racing	7	0	1	0	2	47	5th
2022	European Le Mans Series – LMP3	EuroInternational	1	0	0	0	0	6	20th
2022	Trophée MitJet 2L France	Mitjet International	2	1	0	2	1	0	NC†
2023	Porsche Carrera Cup France	Forestier Racing CLRT	11	0	0	0	0	85	8th
2024	Porsche Sprint Challenge Southern Europe	Martinet by Alméras	6	0	0	0	1	60	7th
2024	Porsche Carrera Cup France	Martinet/Forestier Racing	12	0	0	0	0	85	9th
2024	Porsche Supercup	Martinet/Forestier Racing	8	0	0	0	0	16	16th
2025	Le Mans Cup – LMP3	Forestier Racing by VPS	7	0	0	0	3	70	**3rd**
2025	Ultimate Cup European Series GT Endurance Cup – Porsche Cup	2B Autosport	2	0	0	0	0	0	NC
2025	Alpine Elf Europa Cup		2	0	0	0	0	12	17th
2026	European Le Mans Series – LMP2	Forestier Racing by Panis	6	2	2	1	3	84	**2nd**
2026	24 Hours of Le Mans – LMP2	Forestier Racing by Panis	1	0	0	0	1	—N/a	**3rd**

^{†} As Rousset was a guest driver, he was ineligible to score points.

=== Complete Le Mans Cup results ===
(key) (Races in bold indicate pole position; results in italics indicate fastest lap)

Year	Entrant	Class	Chassis	1	2	3	4	5	6	7	Rank	Points
2022	MV2S Forestier Racing	LMP3	Ligier JS P320	LEC; 2	**IMO**; Ret	LMS; 1; 7	LMS; 2; 11	MNZ; 2	SPA; 7	ALG; Ret	5th	47
2025	Forestier Racing by VPS	LMP3	Ligier JS P325	CAT; 3	LEC; 13	LMS; 1; 5	LMS; 2; 11	SPA; 4	SIL; 2	ALG; 2	3rd	70

=== Complete European Le Mans Series results ===
(key) (Races in bold indicate pole position; results in italics indicate fastest lap)

Year	Entrant	Class	Chassis	Engine	1	2	3	4	5	6	Rank	Points
2022	EuroInternational	LMP3	Ligier JS P320	Nissan VK56DE 5.6 L V8	LEC	IMO	MNZ	CAT; 7	SPA	ALG	20th	6
2026	Forestier Racing by Panis	LMP2	Oreca 07	Gibson GK428 4.2 L V8	CAT; 1	**LEC**; Ret	**IMO**; 1	SPA; 2	SIL; 9	ALG; 4	2nd	84

=== Complete Porsche Carrera Cup France results ===
(key) (Races in bold indicate pole position) (Races in italics indicate fastest lap)

Year	Team	1	2	3	4	5	6	7	8	9	10	11	12	Pos	Points
2023	Forestier Racing CLRT	CAT; 1; 6	CAT; 2; 5	MAG; 1; 16	MAG; 2; 9	LMS; 5	RBR; 1; 8	RBR; 2; 12	MNZ; 1; 5	MNZ; 2; 22	LEC; 1; 7	LEC; 2; 6		8th	85
2024	Martinet/Forestier Racing	CAT; 1; 6	CAT; 2; 7	LEC; 1; 8	LEC; 2; 7	SPA; 1; 11	SPA; 2 Ret	DIJ; 1; 10	DIJ; 2; 8	MUG; 1; 10	MUG; 2; 8	ALG; 1; 8	ALG; 2; 10	9th	85

=== Complete Porsche Supercup results ===
(key) (Races in bold indicate pole position) (Races in italics indicate fastest lap)

Year	Team	1	2	3	4	5	6	7	8	Pos.	Points
2024	Martinet/Forestier Racing	IMO; 15	MON; Ret	RBR; 14	SIL; 14	HUN; 19	SPA; 11	ZAN; 20	MNZ; 16	16th	16

=== Complete 24 Hours of Le Mans results ===
Year	Team	Co-Drivers	Car	Class	Laps	Pos.	Class Pos.
2026	(France) Forestier Racing by Panis	(United Kingdom) Oliver Gray (France) Esteban Masson	Oreca 07-Gibson	LMP2	360	17th	**3rd**
