= Carine Galli =

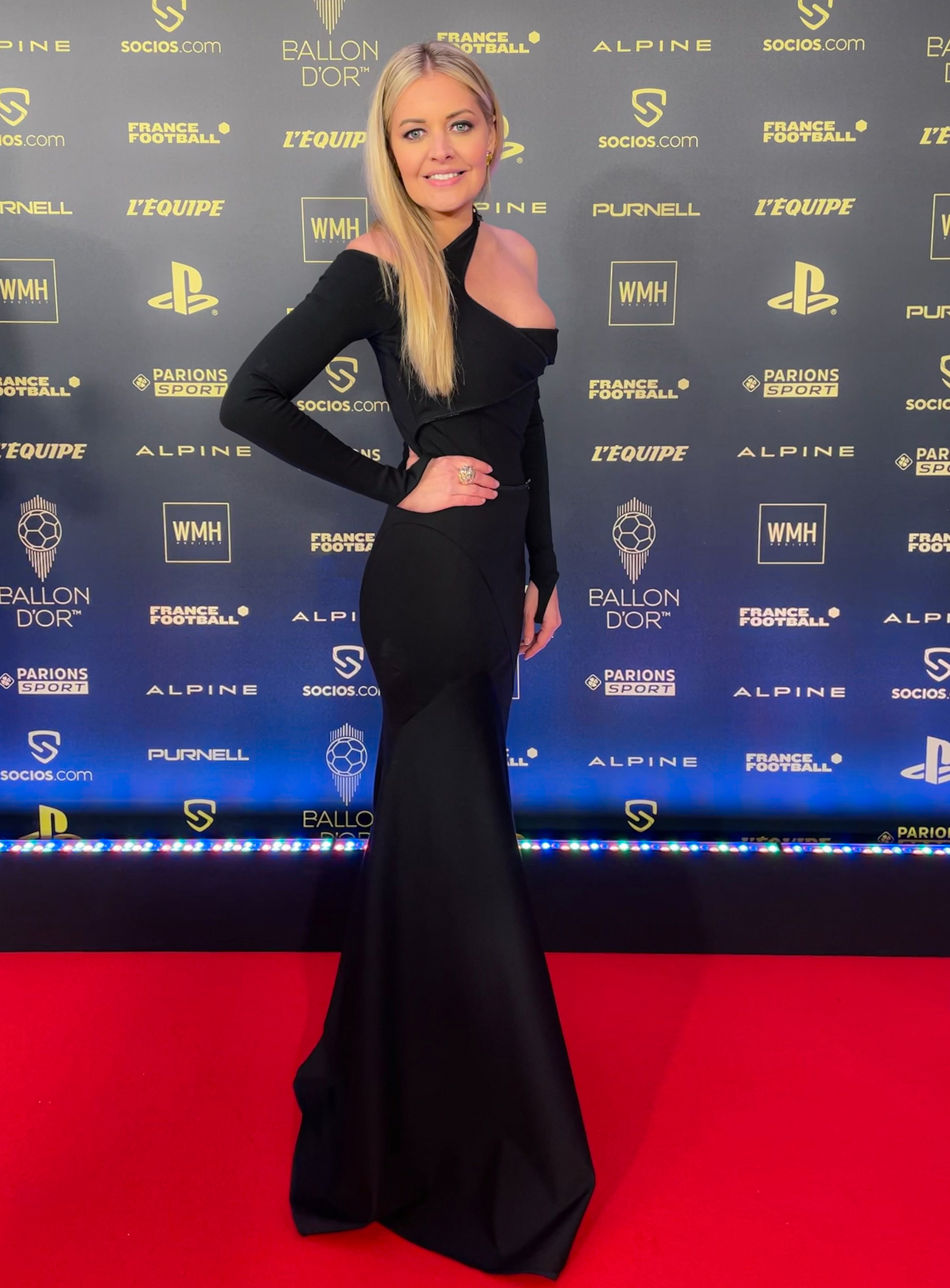
- Carine Galli at the 2021 Ballon d'Or ceremony.
- Born: 10 February 1985 (age 41); Gassin, Var, France
- Occupations: Sports journalist, television presenter
- Years active: 2008–present
- Television: L'Équipe; M6 Group

Carine Galli (born 10 February 1985) is a French television presenter and sports journalist. She has been the correspondent of the channel L'Équipe since 2016.

From 2015 to 2018, she was the presenter of the programme 100% foot on W9. From 2019 to 2020, she presented the program Top départ, lâchez les chevaux on M6.

== Life and career ==
Carine Galli was born in Gassin in the department of Var. She worked punctually from 2009 to 2016 as a redactor for the magazine L'Événementiel, specialized in the off-media communication of the companies. She made her debut on television on OM TV in 2010. She then collaborated on the channels CFoot, RMC, Eurosport, BFM TV, L'Équipe and M6.

In 2015, she is hired by the channel W9 to present the program 100% foot and for the presentation of the evening programs of the UEFA Europa League also broadcast on the channel.

During the UEFA Euro 2016, she became the edge-of-field journalist on M6, in charge to give details close to the field and to collect the reactions of the soccer players after the matches. In August 2016, she left RMC and Eurosport to join the channel L'Équipe as a columnist, correspondent or presenter, while still collaborating with M6 and W9 on presenting 100% foot.

Since September 2017, she is also a consultant for the program Radio foot on the radio station Radio France Internationale.

In September 2018, she became the edge-of-field journalist during the matches of the France national football team on M6 and the France women's national football team on W9.

From October 2019 to March 2020, she presented on M6 the program Top départ, lâchez les chevaux. In parallel, since October 2019, she presents the broadcasts of the Horse Racing Grand-Prix on M6, in company of the consultant Guillaume Covès and racing commentators.

During the UEFA Euro 2020, in June and July 2021, she still occupies the function of edge-of-field journalist on different stadiums through Europe, during the different meetings broadcast on M6. During that same period, she presents on second part of the evening the program Domino Challenge : La folie continue on the same channel. This program shows again the highlights of the annual European domino toppling event : Domino Day, but also on the backstage of Domino Challenge.

While the UEFA Europa League made its return on W9 in September 2021, Marie Portolano replaces her at the presentation of the after-match program 100% foot, because her activities on L'Équipe do not allow her to cover the competition for the M6 Group. During that year, she becomes presenter of the program L'Équipe de Greg each Friday in addition of her function of columnist and correspondent on the canal 21.

Since August 2022, she accentuates her collaboration with the M6 Group with the program RTL Foot, where she is a columnist each Friday and Saturday. She continues to participate at L'Équipe de Greg in which she presents one Friday out of two.

== Private life ==
From 2020 to 2024, Carine Galli was in a relationship with Giovanni Castaldi (son of Jean-Pierre Castaldi), met in the backstage of the channel L'Équipe.
