= Joan Francés Fulcònis =

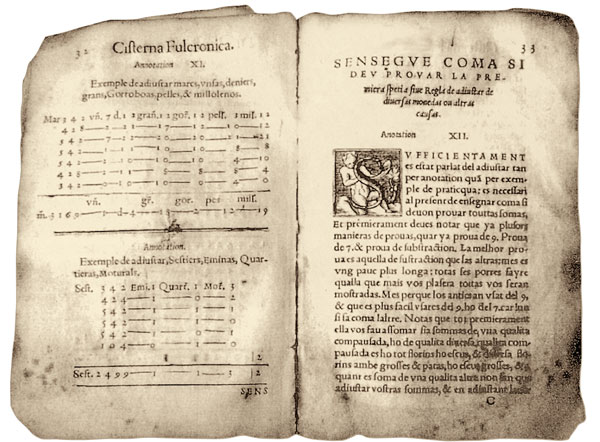
La Cisterna Fulconicra

Joan Francés Fulcònis (in classical Occitan; Johan Frances Fulconis, as written in his original edition) was a mathematician born in Lieusola (today and in French Isola) ca 1520 and who lived in Nice. He is the author of La Cisterna Fulcronica, a treatise of arithmetics written in Occitan language and printed in Lyon in 1562.

== La Cisterna fulconicra ==
The Cisterna has been thoroughly studied and edited by Roger Rocca and Rémy Gasiglia. Fulconis's references are Greek and Arab mathematicians. He was also inspired by Francés Pellos's Compedion de l'Abaco (another arithmetical treaty, and also the first book printed in Occitan language – 1492 – ) though he does not directly mention it (we are sure, however, that he read it because some of his numerical examples are the same as in Pelos's work, which could not be a mere coincidence).

Both the Compendion and the Cisterna are written in Nissard dialect, but Fulconis only refers to his dialect as being Provençal dialect (a more generic word that includes Nissard's area). Whereas the Compedion is a more theoretical work, the Cisterna is very practically oriented to trade and gives many concrete examples that, today, represent for us an illustration of current life and trade relationships of his time.

== Edition ==
- Fulconis, Jouan-Francés. La cisterna fulconicra. Niça : Lou Sourgentin, 1996. Roger Rocca and Rémy Gasiglia's edition.

== Critics ==
- Anatole, Cristian – Lafont, Robert. Nouvelle histoire de la littérature occitane. Paris : P.U.F., 1970.
- Roger Rocca – Paul Castela. La cisterna fulconicra de Ioanes Frances Fulconis 1562 : l'auteur et sa langue. Dissertation thesis, 1992 .

== Journal article ==
- Le comté de Nice: de la Savoie à l'Europe, identité, mémoire et devenir : actes du colloque de Nice. Serre, 2006 (25–26).
