= 2015–16 Andros Trophy =

Seasons
- ← 2014–15 2016–17 →

The 2015–16 Andros Trophy is the 26th season of the Andros Trophy, a motor racing championship for automobile ice racing and motorcycle ice racing held in France and Andorra. The season begins in Val Thorens on 5 December 2015 and finishes on 13 February 2016 in Saint-Dié-des-Vosges.

Jean-Philippe Dayraut is the defending Elite Pro drivers' champion.

== Teams and drivers ==
=== Elite Pro and Elite ===
Team	Car	No.	Elite Pro Drivers	Rounds	Elite Drivers	Rounds
Mazda France	Mazda 3	1	(France) Jean-Philippe Dayraut	All	(France) Jacques Wolff	All
Mazda France	Mazda 3	6	(Finland) Toomas Heikkinen	All	(France) Patrick Lhoste	All
(Belgium) Belgian Audi Club Team WRT	Audi A1 Quattro	2	(France) Olivier Panis	All	(France) Bérénice Demoustier	All
(Belgium) Belgian Audi Club Team WRT	Audi A1 Quattro	11	(France) Adrien Tambay	All	(France) Lionel Daziano	All
(France) Sport Garage	Dacia Lodgy Glace	3	(France) Franck Lagorce	All	(France) Eddy Bénézet	All
(France) Sport Garage	Ford Fiesta	9	(France) Gilles Stievenart	1–2	(France) Christian Beroujon	1–6
(France) Sport Garage	Ford Fiesta	9	(Belgium) Stéphane Lémeret	3–4	(France) Christian Beroujon	1–6
(France) Sport Garage	Ford Fiesta	9	(Switzerland) Jonathan Hirschi	5	(France) Christian Beroujon	1–6
(France) Sport Garage	Ford Fiesta	9	(France) Firmin Caddedu	6	(France) Christian Beroujon	1–6
(France) OHWELL (Note: Entered as AEROKART by OHWELL with car No. 4(B) and as PUSSIER Automobiles by OHWELL with car No. 12(B).)	Citroën DS3	4	(France) Benjamin Riviere	All	(France) Emmanuel Moinel	All
(France) OHWELL	Citroën DS3	12	(France) Laurent Barbieri	1–5, 7	(France) Sylvain Pussier	All
(France) DA Racing	Renault Clio	5	(France) Jean-Baptiste Dubourg	All	(France) Marlène Broggi	1–6
(France) DA Racing	Renault Clio	7	(France) Andréa Dubourg	All	(France) Christophe Jouet	1, 5–6
(France) DA Racing	Renault Clio	7	(France) Andréa Dubourg	All	(France) "Knapick"	2, 4
(France) DA Racing	Renault Clio	7	(France) Andréa Dubourg	All	(France) Anne-Sophie Lemonnier	3
(France) DA Racing	Renault Clio	7	(France) Andréa Dubourg	All	(France) Marlène Broggi	7
(France) Saintéloc Racing	Mazda 3	8	(France) Gérald Fontanel	All	(France) Didier Thoral	All
(France) Saintéloc Racing	Citroën DS3	10	(France) Olivier Pernaut	All	(France) Margot Laffite	All
(France) Saintéloc Racing	Citroën DS3	15	(France) Ludovic Gherardi	1	(France) Thierry Joncoux	1–2, 6
(France) Saintéloc Racing	Citroën DS3	15	(Lebanon) Nabil Karam	6	(Lebanon) Nabil Karam	4
(France) Sodifuel Racing	Renault Clio	14	(France) Grégoire Demoustier	1	(France) Joël Lopez	1–5, 7
(France) Sodifuel Racing	Renault Clio	14	(France) Michaël Petit	2	(France) Joël Lopez	1–5, 7
(France) Sodifuel Racing	Renault Clio	14	(France) Emilie Faure	3	(France) Joël Lopez	1–5, 7
(France) Sodifuel Racing	Renault Clio	14	(France) Gilles Stievenart	5	(France) Joël Lopez	1–5, 7

Not eligible for Teams' Championship

=== Électrique ===
Every driver participates in an electric Andros Trophy car.

Sponsor	No.	Drivers	Rounds
Biovitis	1	(France) Nathanaël Berthon	1–2, 4–7
Biovitis	1	(France) Benoît Tréluyer	3
STEF	2	(France) Vincent Beltoise	All
Andros	3	(France) Franck Lagorce	All
ERDF	4	(France) Laury Thilleman	1, 6
ERDF	4	(France) Simon Pagenaud	2
ERDF	4	(France) Julien Absalon	3
ERDF	4	(France) Arnaud Tsamere	4
ERDF	4	(Monaco) Stéphane Ortelli	5
ERDF	4	(France) Arnaud Ducret	7
Allianz	5	(France) Aurélien Panis	All
Metropole Nice Côte d'Azur	6	(France) Christophe Ferrier	All
Loxam	7	(France) Matthieu Vaxivière	All
ALD Automotive	8	(France) Louis Gervoson	All
GEO PLC	9	(France) Nyls Stievenart	All
Mazda	10	(France) Nico Jamin	4
Mazda	10	(France) Donald Reignoux	5 (Final 1)
All Star Perche	10	(France) Mathilde Riehl	6
Saint-Dié-des-Vosges	10	(France) Quentin Gilbert	7
Pack Consulting	11	(France) Julien Andlauer	3–5
Olympe	11	(France) Arnaud Tsamere	7
Mazda	18	(France) Guillaume Pley	5 (Final 2)

=== Féminin ===
Every driver participates in an FFSA Sprint Car.

No.	Drivers	Rounds
1	(France) Clémentine Lhoste	All
2	(France) Mathilde Riehl	1–2
3	(France) Véronique Dufour	1
3	(Belgium) Annick Joosen	2, 6–7
3	(France) Manon Primard	3–4
4	(France) Laura Monin-Bonnard	All
5	(France) Manon Salaneuve	All
6	(France) Dorothée Lanoe	All
7	(France) Aurore Louison	All
8	(France) Marie Bourdaud	5–6
9	(France) Ilona Bertapelle	3–4
10	(France) Elisa Boissel	6
11	(France) Marie Papillon	6
12	(France) Cindy Lemaire	6

=== AMV Cup ===
Team	Bike	No.	Drivers	Rounds
(France) J. Rolland Racing	Yamaha	4	(France) Vivien Gonnet	All
(France) Enduro Club Aubusson	Husqvarna	5	(France) Elie Vecchi	All
(France) M3C	Kawasaki	6	(France) Noël Duvert	All
(France) Enduro Cross Racing	Yamaha	14	(France) Maxime Thinon	1
(France) Enduro Cross Racing	KTM	14	(France) Maxime Thinon	3, 5–7
(France) Pro Ley	KTM	15	(France) Jérémy Gautier	1, 6
(France) Motoclub Du Berry	Honda	18	(France) Loïc Cartier	1–2, 5–6
(France) Motoclub 1.Pulsion	Honda	34	(France) Sébastien Valla	All
(France) Trebad JLD Ogas	Honda	37	(France) Sylvain Dabert	1
(France) Trebad JLD Ogas	KTM	37	(France) Sylvain Dabert	2–7
(France) Trebad JLD Ogas	KTM	76	(France) Vivian Dabert	All
(France) AMV Cup (Note: Entered as Team Andorre with bikes No. 42 and No. 43 at Le Pas de la Case.)	KTM	40	(France) Mickaël Falquet	1
(France) AMV Cup	KTM	40	(France) Randy de Puniet	2–6
(France) AMV Cup	KTM	41	(France) Jarno Langlois	1
(France) AMV Cup	KTM	41	(France) Ludovic Borg	2–3
(France) AMV Cup	Yamaha	41	(France) Cyprien Poncet	4
(France) AMV Cup	KTM	41	(France) Grégoire Martinez	5
(France) AMV Cup	KTM	41	(France) Louis Rossi	6
(France) AMV Cup	KTM	41	(France) Randy de Puniet	7
(France) AMV Cup	Yamaha	42	(France) Sébastien Midali	1
(France) AMV Cup	Husqvarna	42	(Andorra) Alex Antor	2
(France) AMV Cup	Husqvarna	42	(France) Loris Baz	3–4
(France) AMV Cup	Beta	42	(France) Jérome Bethune	5
(France) AMV Cup	Beta	42	(France) Frédéric Sandouly	6
(France) AMV Cup	Honda	43	(France) Sébastien Suchet	1
(France) AMV Cup	Honda	43	(Andorra) Xavi España Muñoz	2
(France) AMV Cup	KTM	43	(France) Kévin Guillot	3
(France) AMV Cup	Kawasaki	43	(France) Elian Gras	4–5
(France) AMV Cup	Kawasaki	43	(France) Alexis Masbou	6
(France) AMV Cup	Husqvarna	43	(France) Mathieu Saci	7
(France) AMV Cup	Yamaha	44	(France) Béranger Oddos	4
(France) AMV Cup	Beta	44	(France) Etienne Parseihian	5
(France) AMV Cup	Beta	44	(France) Maxime Jeoffre	6
(France) AMV Cup	KTM	45	(France) Stéfan Houben	3
(France) AMV Cup	KTM	45	(France) Thierry Capella	6
(France) Jet 7 Cannes	Yamaha	48	(France) Alexandre De Korsak	All
Team Beta France	Beta	63	(France) Romain Gioffre	All
(France) Motoclub Trièves	Yamaha	69	(France) Randy Peresson	All

== Calendar and results ==
Rnd.	Race	Circuit	Date	Elite Pro winner	Elite winner	Électrique winner	Race	Féminin winner	Race	AMV Cup winner
2015
1	1	(France) Val Thorens, Savoie	5 December	(France) Benjamin Riviere	(France) Didier Thoral	(France) Matthieu Vaxivière	1	(France) Véronique Dufour	1	(France) Sylvain Dabert
1	2	(France) Val Thorens, Savoie	6 December	(France) Franck Lagorce	(France) Eddy Bénézet	(France) Matthieu Vaxivière	2	(France) Véronique Dufour	2	(France) Noël Duvert
2	3	Le Pas de la Case, Andorra	11 December	(Finland) Toomas Heikkinen	(France) Christian Beroujon	(France) Matthieu Vaxivière	3	(France) Clémentine Lhoste	3	(France) Sylvain Dabert
2	4	Le Pas de la Case, Andorra	12 December	(France) Franck Lagorce	(France) Didier Thoral	(France) Matthieu Vaxivière	4	(France) Clémentine Lhoste	4	(France) Sylvain Dabert
3	5	(France) Alpe d'Huez, Isère	18 December	(France) Jean-Baptiste Dubourg	(France) Eddy Bénézet	(France) Aurélien Panis	5	(France) Clémentine Lhoste	5	(France) Vivien Gonnet
3	6	(France) Alpe d'Huez, Isère	19 December	(France) Jean-Philippe Dayraut	(France) Christian Beroujon	(France) Aurélien Panis	6	(France) Laura Monin-Bonnard	6	(France) Vivien Gonnet
2016
4	7	(France) Isola 2000, Alpes-Maritimes	8 January	(France) Jean-Philippe Dayraut	(France) Didier Thoral	(France) Matthieu Vaxivière	7	(France) Clémentine Lhoste	7	(France) Romain Gioffre
4	8	(France) Isola 2000, Alpes-Maritimes	9 January	(France) Jean-Baptiste Dubourg	(France) Eddy Bénézet	(France) Matthieu Vaxivière	8	(France) Aurore Louison	8	(France) Noël Duvert
5	9	(France) Lans-en-Vercors, Isère	22 January	(France) Franck Lagorce	(France) Didier Thoral	(France) Vincent Beltoise	9	(France) Clémentine Lhoste	9	(France) Noël Duvert
5	10	(France) Lans-en-Vercors, Isère	23 January	(France) Franck Lagorce	(France) Eddy Bénézet	(France) Nathanaël Berthon	10	(France) Clémentine Lhoste	10	(France) Noël Duvert
6	11	(France) Super Besse, Puy-de-Dôme	30 January	(France) Jean-Philippe Dayraut	(France) Sylvain Pussier	(France) Nathanaël Berthon	11	(France) Clémentine Lhoste	11	(France) Sylvain Dabert
6	11	(France) Super Besse, Puy-de-Dôme	30 January	(France) Jean-Philippe Dayraut	(France) Sylvain Pussier	(France) Nathanaël Berthon	11	(France) Clémentine Lhoste	12	(France) Sylvain Dabert
7	12	(France) Saint-Dié-des-Vosges, Vosges	13 February	(France) Benjamin Riviere	(France) Lionel Daziano	(France) Aurélien Panis	12	(France) Laura Monin-Bonnard	13	(France) Vivien Gonnet
7	13	(France) Saint-Dié-des-Vosges, Vosges	13 February	(France) Olivier Panis	(France) Sylvain Pussier	(France) Louis Gervoson	12	(France) Laura Monin-Bonnard	14	(France) Sylvain Dabert

== Championship standings ==
=== Points systems ===
==== Elite Pro/Elite ====
Points are awarded for both the two Qualifying sessions and for the Super Final. Only the best result of both Qualifying sessions will count. Both results will count in case of a tie break. For example if Driver A becomes first in Q1 and second in Q2 and Driver B becomes third in Q1 and first in Q2, then Driver A will receive the most points. Points are awarded based on the results of the Qualifying sessions and on finishing positions of the Super Final as shown in the chart below.

In Val Thorens, at Isola 2000 with the Elite championship only, in Lans-en-Vercors – with the exception of the second round with the Elite Pro championship – at Super Besse with the Elite championship only and in Saint-Dié-des-Vosges the field was split up into two. The best half after Qualifying raced in a normal Super Final and the other half raced in a Final. If for example seven drivers raced in the Super Final then the winner of the Final would be classified as 8th.

Position	**1st**	**2nd**	**3rd**	**4th**	**5th**	**6th**	**7th**	**8th**	**9th**	**10th**	**11th**	**12th**	**13th**	**14th**	FL
Qualifying	45	42	40	39	38	37	36	35	34	33	32	31	30	29	–
Super Final	15	14	12	11	10	9	8	7	6	5	4	3	2	1	1

==== Électrique ====
The Électrique championship has the same scoring system as the Elite Pro and Elite championships only with a different number of points and the Super Final is called a Final, because there was no Super Final. Only in Saint-Dié-des-Vosges the Électrique championship had a Final and a Super Final.

Position	**1st**	**2nd**	**3rd**	**4th**	**5th**	**6th**	**7th**	**8th**	**9th**	**10th**	**11th**	**12th**	FL
Qualifying	24	22	20	19	18	17	16	15	14	13	12	11	–
Final (Note: In Saint-Dié-des-Vosges it was called a Super Final.)	12	11	10	9	8	7	6	5	4	3	2	1	1

==== Féminin ====
Points are awarded based on the results of the Practice session and on finishing positions of the Final and Super Final as shown in the chart below.

Position	**1st**	**2nd**	**3rd**	**4th**	**5th**	**6th**	**7th**	**8th**	**9th**	**10th**	**11th**	**12th**
Practice	12	11	10	9	8	7	6	5	4	3	2	1
(Super) Final	15	13	11	9	8	7	6	5	4	3	2	1

==== AMV Cup ====
Points are awarded based on finishing positions of the Final and Super Final as shown in the chart below.

Position	**1st**	**2nd**	**3rd**	**4th**	**5th**	**6th**	**7th**	**8th**	**9th**	**10th**	**11th**	**12th**	**13th**	**14th**	**15th**	**16th**
(Super) Final	25	20	16	13	12	11	10	9	8	7	6	5	4	3	2	1

==== Points dropped ====
In the Elite Pro, Elite, Electrique and Féminin Championships each driver's two lowest-scoring rounds were dropped from their total.

=== Drivers' Championships ===
==== Elite Pro ====
Pos.	Driver	VTH (France)		PCA (Andorra)		HUE (France)		ISO (France)		LVE (France)		SBE (France)	STV (France)		Points
Pos.	Driver	SF1	SF2	SF1	SF2	SF1	SF2	SF1	SF2	SF1	SF2	SF	SF1	SF2	Points
1	(France) Jean-Baptiste Dubourg	2^{1}	4	4	2^{1}	1^{2}	2^{1}	3	1^{1}	4	(7)	(6)	4	2^{2}	604 (694)
2	(France) Franck Lagorce	(8)	1^{1}	2	1^{2}	5	7	**4**^{1}	(**11**)	**1**^{2}	**1**^{1 2}	4	2	6	593 (672)
3	(France) Benjamin Riviere	1^{2}	5	(11)	3	**6**	**5**	2	4	2	(6)	5	**1**^{1 2}	**5**	563 (647)
4	(France) Adrien Tambay	4	(9^{F})	3^{2}	(10)	4	4	6	3^{2}	3^{1}	3	3	5	7^{F}	558 (642)
5	(France) Olivier Panis	3	3	**10**	**DSQ**†	2^{1}	3	5	(12)	8	4	2^{1}	7^{F}	1^{1}	553 (593)
6	(France) Jean-Philippe Dayraut	**9**	**8**	DNS	8	WD	1^{2}	1^{2}	5	5	2	1^{2}	3	4	544
7	(Finland) Toomas Heikkinen	11^{F}	7	1^{1}	WD	3	6	(11)	6	7	5	7	9	3	513 (551)
8	(France) Andréa Dubourg	6	2^{2}	6	4	8	(13)	12	2	6	8	(11)	6	9	506 (581)
9	(France) Olivier Pernaut	5	6	5	5	7	8	7	7	(10)	9	(8)	8	8	484 (563)
10	(France) Gérald Fontanel	(12)	(11)	7	6	10	10	8	8	11	11	9	10	10	430 (501)
11	(France) Laurent Barbieri	13	12	WD	WD	DNS	12	10	10	12	12		11	11	314
12	(France) Gilles Stievenart	10	DNS	8	7					DNS	WD				171
13	(Belgium) Stéphane Lémeret					9	9	9	9						153
14	(France) Grégoire Demoustier	7	13												78
15	(France) Michaël Petit			9	9										78
16	(Switzerland) Jonathan Hirschi									9^{F}	10				76
17	(France) Emilie Faure					11	11								71
18	(France) Ludovic Gherardi	14	10												65
19	(France) Firmin Caddedu											10			39
20	(Lebanon) Nabil Karam											**12**			34

Colour	Result
Gold	Winner
Silver	Second place
Bronze	Third place
Green	Points classification
Blue	Non-points classification
Blue	Non-classified finish (NC)
Purple	Retired, not classified (Ret)
Red	Did not qualify (DNQ)
Red	Did not pre-qualify (DNPQ)
Black	Disqualified (DSQ)
White	Did not start (DNS)
White	Withdrew (WD)
White	Race cancelled (C)
Blank	Did not practice (DNP)
Blank	Did not arrive (DNA)
Blank	Excluded (EX)

**Bold** – Fastest time in Practice
Italics – Fastest time in (Super) Final
(parentheses) - Round dropped from total
^{1} – Fastest in/Winner of Qualifying 1
^{2} – Fastest in/Winner of Qualifying 2
^{F} – Winner of Final

Notes

- † — Panis lost all his points awarded after Qualifying and the Super Final after deliberately crashing into Dayraut.

==== Elite ====
Pos.	Driver	VTH (France)		PCA (Andorra)		HUE (France)		ISO (France)		LVE (France)		SBE (France)	STV (France)		Points
Pos.	Driver	SF1	SF2	SF1	SF2	SF1	SF2	SF1	SF2	SF1	SF2	SF	SF1	SF2	Points
1	(France) Eddy Bénézet	(8)	1^{1}	5	(7)	1^{1}	2^{1}	**2**^{1}	**1**^{1}	4^{1 2}	1^{1 2}	**2**^{2}	4	2^{1}	620 (699)
2	(France) Didier Thoral	**1**	**2**^{2}	3	1^{2}	2^{2}	(6)	1^{2}	4	1	2	4	(10)	4	601 (687)
3	(France) Sylvain Pussier	3	6	6	2^{1}	**6**	**4**	(8)	2^{2}	(8)	4	1^{1}	**3**	**1**^{2}	577 (662)
4	(France) Lionel Daziano	2^{2}	5	4	9	7	5	5	3	(13)	(8)	8	1^{1 2}	5	544 (621)
5	(France) Christian Beroujon	4	7	1^{2}	4	5	1^{2}	10	5	**5**	**10**	5			530
6	(France) Jacques Wolff	(14)	8	DNS	5	3	7	3	12	2	3	9^{F}	2	3	522 (553)
7	(France) Marlène Broggi	(9^{F})	4	7	(8)	8	3	6	7	6	5	6	7^{F}	8	500 (581)
8	(France) Margot Laffite	5	(11)	8	6	4	8	7	(14)	7	6	3	8	6	498 (564)
9	(France) Emmanuel Moinel	13	13	9	10	11	11	(14)	6	9^{F}	9^{F}	(13)	11	11	420 (486)
10	(France) Bérénice Demoustier	12	(12)	10	12	10	12	11	10	11	11	(11)	5	9	419 (486)
11	(France) Patrick Lhoste	11	9^{2 F}	12	WD	9	10	9^{F}	11	10	(13)	10	9	7^{F}	414 (446)
12	(France) Joël Lopez	10	10	11	11	12	13	(13)	13	12	12		6	10	396 (427)
13	(France) Christophe Jouet	6^{1}	3							3	7	7			233
14	(France) "Knapick"			**2**^{1}	**3**			4	8						199
15	(France) Thierry Joncoux	7	14	DNS	WD							12			100
16	(Lebanon) Nabil Karam							12	9^{F}						76
17	(France) Anne-Sophie Lemonnier					13	9								70

==== Électrique ====
Pos.	Driver	VTH (France)		PCA (Andorra)		HUE (France)		ISO (France)		LVE (France)		SBE (France)	STV (France)		Points
Pos.	Driver	F1	F2	F1	F2	F1	F2	F1	F2	F1	F2	F	SF1	SF2	Points
1	(France) Matthieu Vaxivière	1^{1 2}	1^{1 2}	**1**^{1 2}	**1**^{2}	4	2	1^{1 2}	1^{1}	3	4	(7)	2	(5)	362 (414)
2	(France) Aurélien Panis	(6)	(5)	6	5	**1**^{2}	**1**^{2}	4	5	2^{1}	5	2^{1}	**1**^{1 2}	**3**^{1}	337 (386)
3	(France) Christophe Ferrier	3	2	4	(8)	2^{1}	3^{1}	3	3	(9)	2^{1}	5	5	2	329 (367)
4	(France) Nathanaël Berthon	2	4	5	4^{1}			6	7	4	1^{2}	1^{2}	3	9	316
5	(France) Franck Lagorce	**8**	**6**	2	2	(9)	10	**2**	**2**^{2}	**5**	**3**	9	6	(8)	307 (346)
6	(France) Vincent Beltoise	4	7	(8)	3	5	4	5	4	1^{2}	(11)	6	4	7^{F}	295 (338)
7	(France) Louis Gervoson	5	3	3	6	3	6	(10)	6	(7)	6	3	7^{F}	1^{2}	291 (328)
8	(France) Nyls Stievenart	9	8	9	9	WD	8	7	(11)	8	8	**4**	9	6	219 (234)
9	(France) Julien Andlauer					6	5	9	9	11	9				122
10	(France) Arnaud Tsamere							11	10				10	11	60
11	(France) Laury Thilleman	7	9									8			56
12	(France) Quentin Gilbert												8	4	51
13	(France) Simon Pagenaud			7	7										44
14	(France) Benoît Tréluyer					8	9								44
15	(Monaco) Stéphane Ortelli									6	7				43
16	(France) Nico Jamin							8	8						41
17	(France) Julien Absalon					7	7								40
18	(France) Arnaud Ducret												11	10	29
19	(France) Mathilde Riehl											10			17
20	(France) Donald Reignoux									10					15
21	(France) Guillaume Pley										10				15

==== Féminin ====
Pos.	Driver	VTH (France)		PCA (Andorra)		HUE (France)		ISO (France)		LVE (France)		SBE (France)	STV (France)	Points
Pos.	Driver	SF1	SF2	SF1	SF2	SF1	SF2	SF1	SF2	SF1	SF2	SF	SF	Points
1	(France) Clémentine Lhoste	2	(6)	**1**^{F}	**1**^{F}	**1**^{F}	3	1^{F}	(4)	**1**^{F}	**1**^{F}	**1**^{F}	4	391 (444)
2	(France) Aurore Louison	(3)	2	6	(6)	2	2	**3**	**1**	4	3	4	2	341 (390)
3	(France) Laura Monin-Bonnard	(4)	3	3	3	(4)	**1**^{F}	4	2^{F}	3	4	2	**1**^{F}	333 (382)
4	(France) Manon Salaneuve	5	(4)	4	2	3	5	2	3	2	2	3	WD	309 (333)
5	(France) Dorothée Lanoe	7	7	5	5	DNS	WD	5	5	WD	WD	6	WD	152
6	(Belgium) Annick Joosen			2	4							5	3	120
7	(France) Véronique Dufour	**1**^{F}	**1**^{F}											84
8	(France) Mathilde Riehl	6	5	DNS	DNS									61
9	(France) Marie Bourdaud									5	5	9		60
10	(France) Ilona Bertapelle					5	6	WD	WD					51
11	(France) Manon Primard					6	4	WD	WD					46
12	(France) Elisa Boissel											7		19
13	(France) Cindy Lemaire											10		14
14	(France) Marie Papillon											8		13

==== AMV Cup ====
Pos.	Rider	VTH (France)		PCA (Andorra)		HUE (France)		ISO (France)		LVE (France)		SBE (France)		STV (France)		Pts.
Pos.	Rider	F	SF	F	SF	F	SF	F	SF	F	SF	F	SF	F	SF	Pts.
1	(France) Sylvain Dabert	1	2	**1**	**1**	2	2	3	2	**2**	**2**	**1**	**1**	**3**	**1**	302
2	(France) Noël Duvert	3	1	3	4	3	5	2	1	1	1	3	3	2	2	265
3	(France) Vivien Gonnet	**4**	**3**	4	2	**1**	**1**	14	4	3	3	2	2	1	5	237
4	(France) Vivian Dabert	2	4	2	3	5	4	**4**	**3**	9	5	12	4	WD	WD	161
5	(France) Randy Peresson	9	7	6	6	8	8	7	7	4	4	15	7	6	4	140
6	(France) Elie Vecchi	8	9	7	9	11	7	6	6	10	11	8	8	5	3	132
7	(France) Romain Gioffre	5	5	5	5	4	3	1	5	15	DNS	11	11	WD	WD	128
8	(France) Sébastien Valla	14	14	14	11	7	6	13	12	6	8	13	12	8	7	93
9	(France) Randy de Puniet			8	14	10	9	12	10	13	10	5	15	4	8	86
10	(France) Loïc Cartier	10	10	9	8					8	9	6	6			70
11	(France) Maxime Thinon	16	15			13	12			12	14	9	9	7	6	57
12	(France) Alexandre De Korsak	12	12	12	13	9	11	11	13	14	13	16	13	WD	WD	55
13	(France) Loris Baz					6	14	5	11							32
14	(France) Elian Gras							10	9	11	12					26
15	(France) Maxime Jeoffre											4	5			25
16	(France) Grégoire Martinez									5	6					23
17	(France) Sébastien Midali	7	6													21
18	(France) Jérémy Gautier	13	13									7	14			21
19	(France) Jarno Langlois	6	8													20
20	(France) Etienne Parseihian									7	7					20
21	(France) Béranger Oddos							8	8							18
22	(Andorra) Xavi España Muñoz			10	7											17
23	(France) Mathieu Saci													9	9	16
24	(France) Frédéric Sandouly											10	10			14
25	(Andorra) Alex Antor			11	10											13
26	(France) Stéfan Houben					12	10									12
27	(France) Mickaël Falquet	11	11													12
28	(France) Cyprien Poncet							9	14							11
29	(France) Ludovic Borg			13	12	WD	WD									9
30	(France) Kévin Guillot					14	13									7
31	(France) Alexis Masbou											14	17			4
32	(France) Sébastien Suchet	15	16													3
33	(France) Louis Rossi											18	16			2
34	(France) Thierry Capella											17	DNS			1
–	(France) Jérome Bethune									WD	WD					0

=== Teams' Championship ===
==== Elite Pro/Elite ====
Only the best two Elite Pro drivers and the best two Elite drivers are included in the Teams' Championship. Also one team can only enter the Teams' Championship with four cars.

Pos.	Team	No.	VTH (France)		PCA (Andorra)		HUE (France)		ISO (France)		LVE (France)		SBE (France)	STV (France)		Points
Pos.	Team	No.	SF1	SF2	SF1	SF2	SF1	SF2	SF1	SF2	SF1	SF2	SF	SF1	SF2	Points
1	(Belgium) Belgian Audi Club Team WRT	2	3	3	**10**	**DSQ**†	2^{1}	3	5	(12)	8	4	2^{1}	7^{F}	1^{1}	2074 (2342)
1	(Belgium) Belgian Audi Club Team WRT	2B	2^{2}	5	4	9	7	5	5	3	(13)	(8)	8	1^{1 2}	5	2074 (2342)
1	(Belgium) Belgian Audi Club Team WRT	11	4	(9^{F})	3^{2}	(10)	4	4	6	3^{2}	3^{1}	3	3	5	7^{F}	2074 (2342)
1	(Belgium) Belgian Audi Club Team WRT	11B	12	(12)	10	12	10	12	11	10	11	11	(11)	5	9	2074 (2342)
2	(France) Saintéloc Racing	8	(12)	(11)	7	6	10	10	8	8	11	11	9	10	10	2013 (2315)
2	(France) Saintéloc Racing	8B	**1**	**2**^{2}	3	1^{2}	2^{2}	(6)	1^{2}	4	1	2	4	(10)	4	2013 (2315)
2	(France) Saintéloc Racing	10	5	6	5	5	7	8	7	7	(10)	9	(8)	8	8	2013 (2315)
2	(France) Saintéloc Racing	10B	5	(11)	8	6	4	8	7	(14)	7	6	3	8	6	2013 (2315)
3	Mazda France	1	**9**	**8**	DNS	8	WD	1^{2}	1^{2}	5	5	2	1^{2}	3	4	1993 (2094)
3	Mazda France	1B	(14)	8	DNS	5	3	7	3	12	2	3	9^{F}	2	3	1993 (2094)
3	Mazda France	6	11^{F}	7	1^{1}	WD	3	6	(11)	6	7	5	7	9	3	1993 (2094)
3	Mazda France	6B	11	9^{2 F}	12	WD	9	10	9^{F}	11	10	(13)	10	9	7^{F}	1993 (2094)
4	(France) Sport Garage	3	**8**	**6**	2	2	(9)	10	**2**	**2**^{2}	**5**	**3**	9	6	(8)	1896 (2054)
4	(France) Sport Garage	3B	(8)	1^{1}	5	(7)	1^{1}	2^{1}	**2**^{1}	**1**^{1}	4^{1 2}	1^{1 2}	**2**^{2}	4	2^{1}	1896 (2054)
4	(France) Sport Garage	9 (Note: Points achieved by Gilles Stievenart, Jonathan Hirschi and Firmin Caddedu are not included in the Teams' Championship, because only the best two Elite Pro drivers and the best two Elite drivers are included in the Teams' Championship.)	10	DNS	8	7	9	9	9	9	9^{F}	10	10			1896 (2054)
4	(France) Sport Garage	9B	4	7	1^{2}	4	5	1^{2}	10	5	**5**	**10**	5			1896 (2054)
5	(France) OHWELL	4	1^{2}	5	(11)	3	**6**	**5**	2	4	2	(6)	5	**1**^{1 2}	**5**	1874 (2109)
5	(France) OHWELL	4B	13	13	9	10	11	11	(14)	6	9^{F}	9^{F}	(13)	11	11	1874 (2109)
5	(France) OHWELL	12	13	12	WD	WD	DNS	12	10	10	12	12		11	11	1874 (2109)
5	(France) OHWELL	12B	3	6	6	2^{1}	**6**	**4**	(8)	2^{2}	(8)	4	1^{1}	**3**	**1**^{2}	1874 (2109)
6	(France) DA Racing	5	2^{1}	4	4	2^{1}	1^{2}	2^{1}	3	1^{1}	4	(7)	(6)	4	2^{2}	1843 (2089)
6	(France) DA Racing	5B	(9^{F})	4	7	(8)	8	3	6	7	6	5	6			1843 (2089)
6	(France) DA Racing	7	6	2^{2}	6	4	8	(13)	12	2	6	8	(11)	6	9	1843 (2089)
6	(France) DA Racing	7B (Note: Points achieved by "Knapick" and Anne-Sophie Lemonnier are not included in the Teams' Championship, because only the best two Elite Pro drivers and the best two Elite drivers are included in the Teams' Championship. Also Marlène Broggi is one of the two best Elite drivers of DA Racing, but instead of driving in the No. 5B, she drove in the No. 7B instead.)	6^{1}	3	**2**^{1}	**3**	13	9	4	8	3	7	7	7^{F}	8	1843 (2089)
7	(France) Sodifuel Racing	14 (Note: Points achieved by Michaël Petit and Emilie Faure are not included in the Teams' Championship, because only the best two Elite Pro drivers and the best two Elite drivers are included in the Teams' Championship. Although Gilles Stievenart achieved 141 points in the first two rounds with Sport Garage, his full 171 points earned with Sport Garage and Sodifuel Racing are included in Sodifuel Racing in the Teams' standings.)	7	13	9	9	11	11			DNS	WD				645 (676)
7	(France) Sodifuel Racing	14B	10	10	11	11	12	13	(13)	13	12	12		6	10	645 (676)

Notes

- The car numbers without B behind them indicate Elite Pro entries and with B behind them indicate Elite entries.
