= Matthieu Vaxivière =

French racing driver (born 1994)

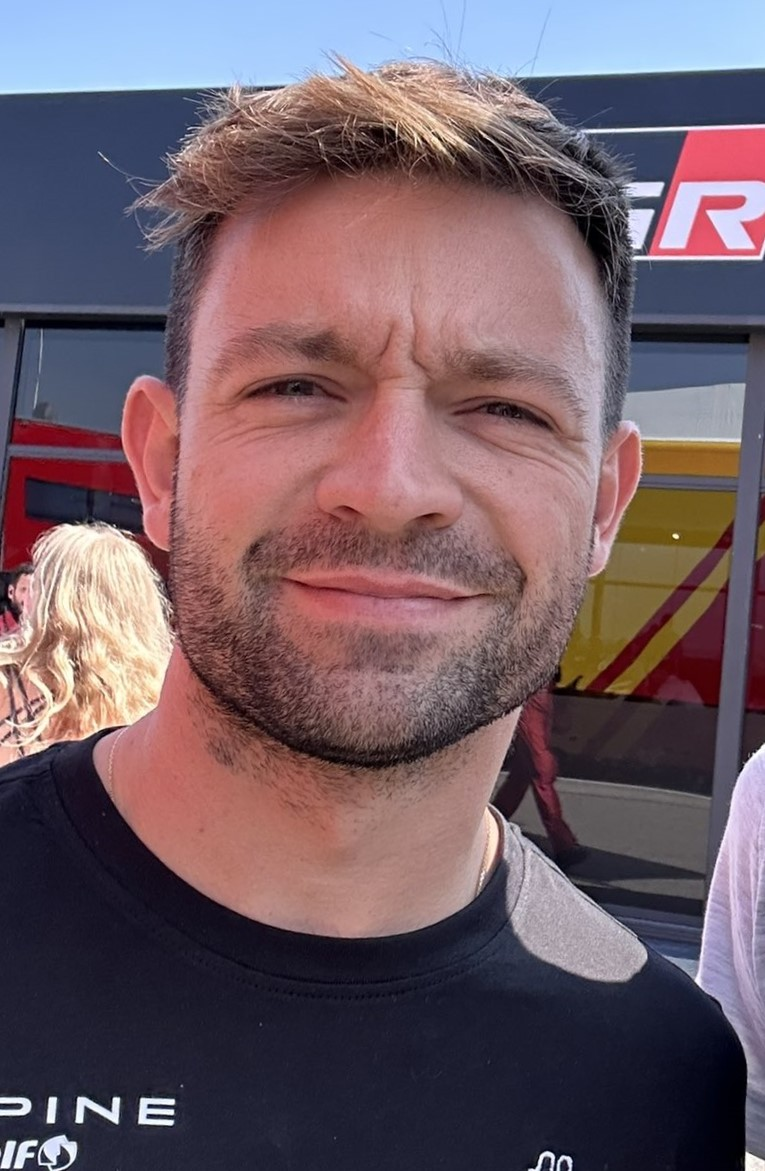
- Vaxivière in 2023
- Nationality: (France) French
- Born: 3 December 1994 (age 31) Limoges, France

FIA World Endurance Championship career
- Debut season: 2017
- Current team: Alpine Elf Team
- Categorisation: FIA Silver (2014); FIA Gold (2015–)
- Car number: 36
- Former teams: TDS Racing
- Starts: 43
- Wins: 2
- Podiums: 16
- Poles: 1
- Fastest laps: 4
- Best finish: 2nd in 2022

Previous series
- 2018-2020 2014-2016 2012-13 2013 2012 2011 2010 2009: Blancpain GT Endurance Cup; Formula V8 3.5; Eurocup Formula Renault 2.0; Formula Renault 2.0 Alps; Porsche Carrera Cup France; French F4 Championship; Mitjet Series; Andros Trophy

Championship titles
- 2023-2024 2015-16 2011: European Le Mans Series - LMP2 Pro-Am; Andros Trophy Électrique; French F4 Championship

Matthieu Vaxivière (born 3 December 1994) is a French racing driver, best known for his endurance racing success with Alpine.

A former Lotus F1 junior, Vaxivière won the French F4 Championship in 2011 and was Formula Renault 3.5 Series runner-up in 2015. He entered endurance racing in 2017, driving for TDS Racing alongside François Perrodo in LMP2. Vaxivière finished second on his DPi debut for Cadillac at the 2019 12 Hours of Sebring, and also won twice in GT World Challenge Europe: for R-Motorsport in 2018 and for Team WRT in 2020.

In 2021, Vaxivière signed with Alpine as a factory driver for the FIA World Endurance Championship, alongside Nicolas Lapierre and André Negrão. They were Hypercar runners-up in 2022, as Alpine took the fight to Toyota with victories at Sebring and Monza. Additionally, Vaxivière reunited with Perrodo at AF Corse, guiding him to a pair of LMP2 Pro-Am titles in the European Le Mans Series in 2023 and 2024.

== Early career ==
=== Karting ===
Vaxivière started his racing career in 2005 in the Karting Championship of France.

=== Car racing debut ===
Having made his car racing debut in the MitJet Series in 2010, Vaxivière progressed to the French F4 Championship the subsequent year. A successful campaign followed, as he took the title by winning three races, which included a double victory at Pau.

=== Formula Renault 2.0 ===
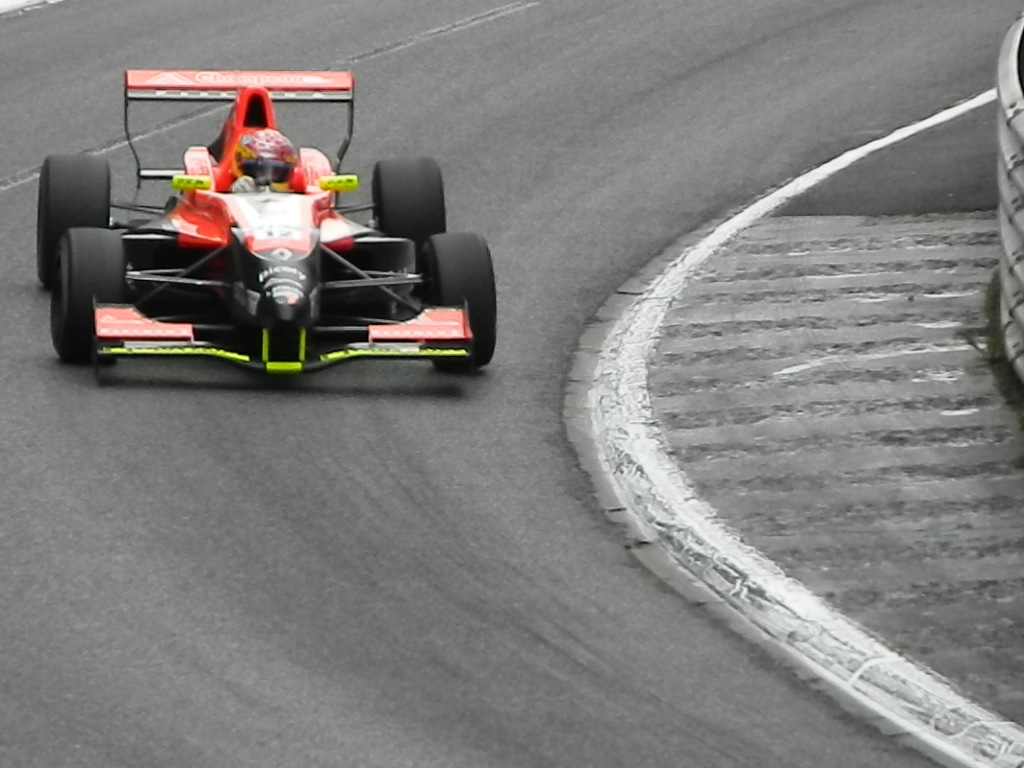
Vaxivière scored a podium in the second Pau Grand Prix support race in 2012.

Vaxiviere entered his debut season of the Eurocup Formula Renault 2.0 in 2012 with Tech 1 Racing, which he finished in 29th position with a single point. The Frenchman experienced a more fruitful year in 2013, ending up tenth overall with a pair of victories at Aragón proving to be the highlight of the season.

=== Formula Renault 3.5 ===
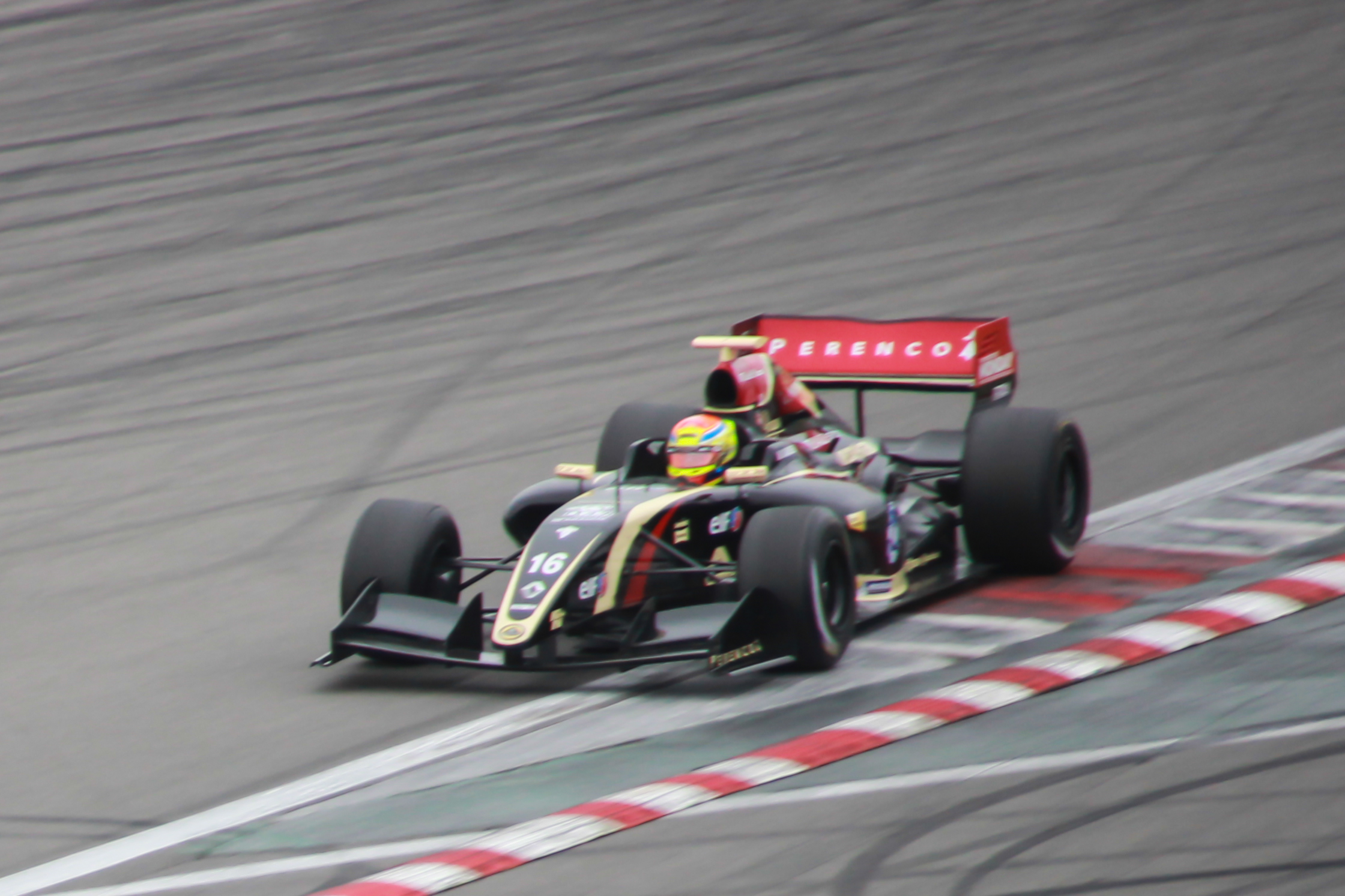
Vaxivière took his first Formula Renault 3.5 podium at the Nürburgring.

After his two seasons in the Eurocup and several post-season tests with both Pons Racing and Lotus, Vaxivière graduated to the Formula Renault 3.5 Series for the 2014 season, driving for Lotus as a member of the Lotus F1 Junior Team alongside Marlon Stöckinger. He finished eighth overall despite missing two rounds due to an injury.

Vaxivière returned to Lotus for the 2015 season. Three wins and a heap of podiums made him vice-champion.

For the first season of the newly rebranded Formula V8 3.5 Series, Vaxivière would partner Matevos Isaakyan at SMP Racing. This season, he amassed seven podiums, two of which were wins, and took home fourth place in the standings.

== Sportscar debut ==
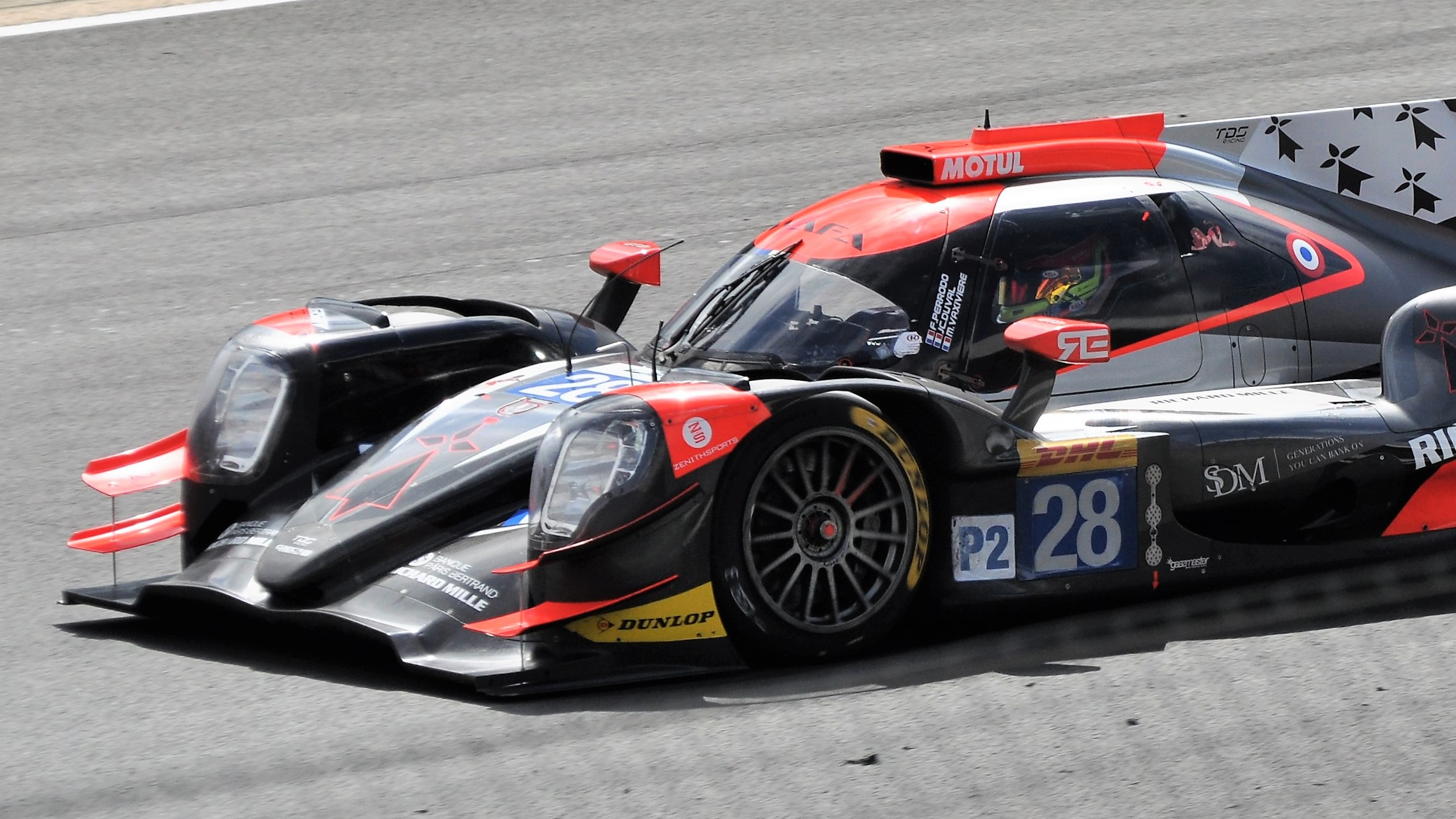
Vaxivière driving in the 2018 6 Hours of Silverstone.

Having competed in various endurance events such as the GT3 Le Mans Cup throughout his time in junior formulae, Vaxivière made his full-time transition into sportscar racing near the end of 2016, when he partnered Michele Rugolo and Stéphane Lémeret in the GT category of the Asian Le Mans Series from round two onwards. He helped DH Racing to finish second in the championship, having taken victory at the Fuji Speedway.

Vaxivière's main campaign in 2017 would lie in the LMP2 class of the FIA World Endurance Championship, which he contested with TDS Racing. Having taken a podium on debut at Silverstone, he finished 16th in the drivers' standings.

2018 would start out positively for Vaxivière, who finished second in the first two races of the European Le Mans Series with TDS before embarking on a season in the WEC with the French team. A podium during the 2019 24 Hours of Le Mans would prove to be the highlight of his season, which Vaxivière finished eighth overall.

As a result of the COVID-19 pandemic, 2020 saw Vaxivière compete in a myriad of championships, including the GT World Challenge Europe Endurance Cup or the Mitjet International series, where he took four wins from as many appearances. That year also yielded another podium at Le Mans, Vaxivière driving for Panis Racing alongside Nico Jamin and Julien Canal.

== Alpine works driver ==
=== 2021: Hypercar debut ===
For the 2021 season, Vaxivière teamed up with Nicolas Lapierre and André Negrão to drive an Alpine A480 in the Hypercar category of the FIA World Endurance Championship. The campaign began on a promising note, as the team finished second at Spa-Francorchamps before Vaxivière followed that up by taking a pole position at the Algarve Round. The outfit stabilized their pace after another second place in Monza, with them taking third for the remaining rounds, Vaxivière and his teammates being unable to match the pace of the Toyota Gazoo Racing squad.

=== 2022: WEC title challenge ===
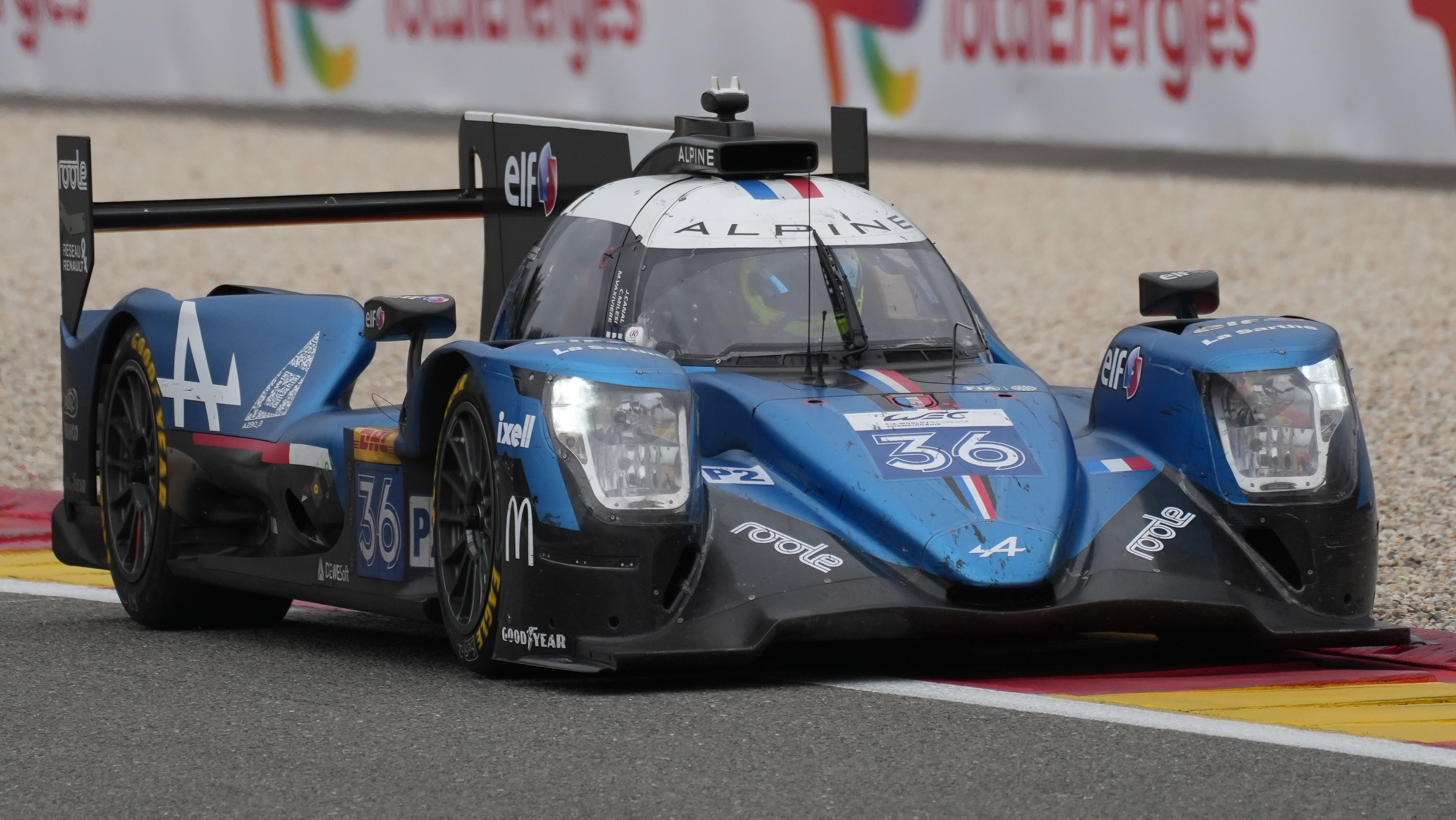
Vaxivière competing at the 2023 6 Hours of Spa-Francorchamps.

Nevertheless, Vaxivière, Lapierre and Negrão returned to Alpine in 2022. At the season opener in Sebring, he put on a particularly impressive showing, setting the fastest lap and helping his team to their first victory in the Hypercar category. Vaxivière and his partners took second at Spa before finishing a disappointing fourth in the 24 Hours of Le Mans, as issues with the car's clutch control and ignition coil systems respectively put the team out of contention for the podium. They bounced back emphatically in Monza, where, having made contact in a hard-fought battle with the Toyota of Kamui Kobayashi, Vaxivière scored another win. However, this would end up being the team's final finish ahead of their rivals Toyota, with a power reduction for the final two races thanks to the BoP mechanism leading to Alpine finishing second in the overall standings.

=== 2023: LMP2 return & Pro-Am title ===
Vaxivière and Alpine stepped down to the LMP2 category for the 2023 season, where the French driver partnered Charles Milesi and Julien Canal. The team would finish the season seventh overall with a podium at Monza.

In addition, Vaxivière paired up with François Perrodo and Ben Barnicoat to race in the Pro-Am Cup of the European Le Mans Series that same year. After starting the campaign with two class podiums, Vaxivière helped AF Corse towards its first Pro-Am win of the season at Aragón, where he passed title rival Louis Delétraz for the lead with half an hour to go. The same pair once again battled hard for position at Spa-Francorchamps, where Vaxivière once again came out on top, thus securing fourth in class. Third at the first Portugal race was followed by a victory at the season-ending 4 Hours of Portimão, where late defensive driving from Barnicoat against Malthe Jakobsen proved decisive in securing the Pro-Am title for Vaxivière and Perrodo.

=== 2024: Alpine Hypercar & back-to-back ELMS titles ===
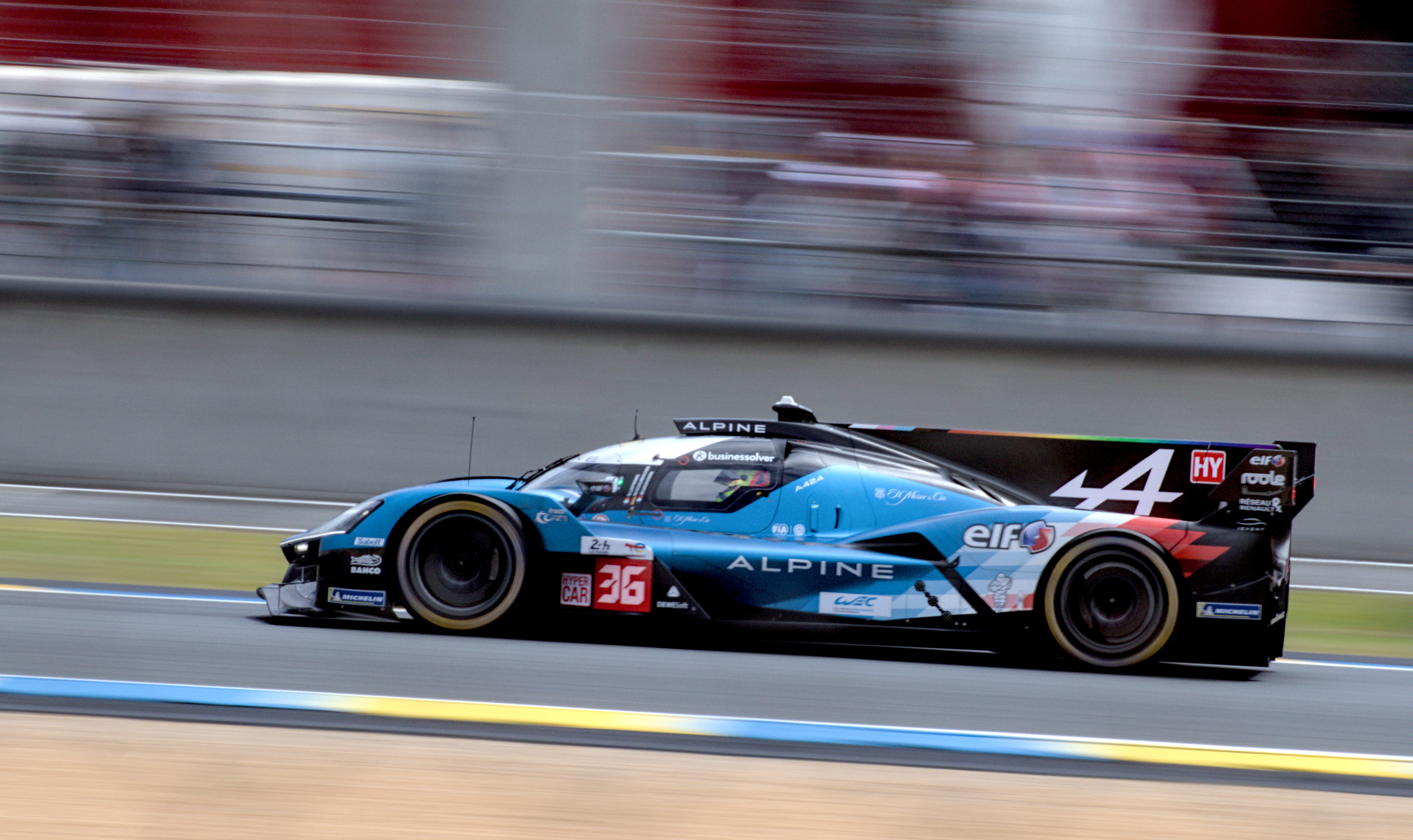
Vaxivière driving the A424 at the 2024 24 Hours of Le Mans

With the LMP2 category being dropped from the WEC for the 2024 season, Vaxivière would continue driving for Alpine in their new Hypercar, the A424, alongside Nicholas Lapierre and Mick Schumacher. The season, featuring four new manufacturers in the Hypercar class (BMW, Lamborghini, Isotta Fraschini, and Alpine themselves), would begin well for the Alpine team in the first round in Qatar, placing best of the four Hypercar debutants, with Vaxivière's car finishing 11th out of 19 in class. At the following round in Imola, Vaxivière was involved in a first-lap collision, which necessitated two laps of car repairs. Following an anonymous Spa event, the No. 36 Alpine retired from the 24 Hours of Le Mans with a driveshaft problem. Finally, Vaxivière and his teammates scored the entry's first point at São Paulo and, despite struggling during the opening stint owing to the choice of hard rear tyres, followed that up with ninth place at Austin. A further breakthrough came in Japan, where overtakes by Schumacher secured the team's maiden Hypercar podium with third place. The season ended with ninth place at Bahrain.

Vaxivière continued racing in LMP2 with AF Corse in 2024. Having contested the 2023–24 Asian Le Mans Series during the winter and gotten a best result of second twice, Vaxivière paired up with Perrodo and two-time substitute of 2023, Alessio Rovera, to defend the Pro-Am title in the ELMS. A strong pit strategy allowed the trio to start the season with a win at Barcelona, though the next race saw Vaxivière drop to fourth during the final stint due to high tyre wear. Second at Imola preceded a commanding class victory at Spa, which earned the No. 83 crew a 20-point lead going into the Mugello event. Their lead would be diminished however, as Rovera collided with a GT entry and got the car stranded in the gravel; they ended up seventh in the race. With a four-way title fight coming to a head in Portimão, it was drama on the final lap that decided the championship in AF Corse's favour: the leading Algarve Pro Racing entry ran out of fuel on the final lap and was passed by Bent Viscaal's Proton Competition car, thereby letting Vaxivière claim the title with fourth place at the flag.

=== 2025 ===
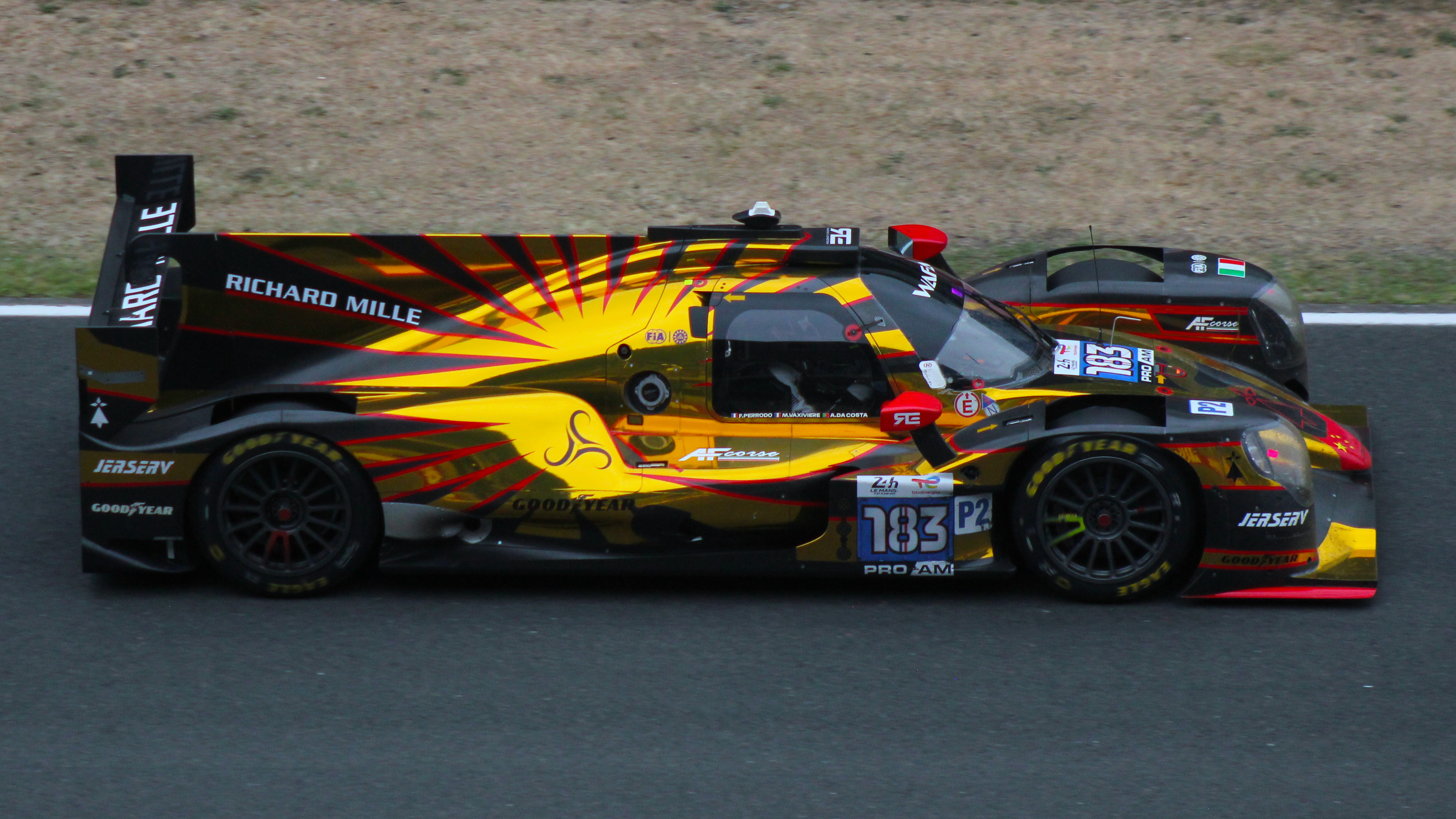
Vaxivière's No. 183 car at the 2025 24 Hours of Le Mans

During the winter, Vaxivière once again raced in the Asian Le Mans Series at AF Corse. With three podiums, including a win at the second Abu Dhabi race where Vaxivière overtook Nicky Catsburg in the closing laps, he, Rovera, and Perrodo finished third in the standings. In the meantime, the Frenchman was demoted to reserve driver duties at Alpine for the 2025 WEC Season. This meant that he would concentrate on racing in the ELMS, entering with an unchanged lineup and in view of a third successive Pro-Am crown.

Barcelona provided Vaxivière with a standout performance in the season's first race: after taking the lead of the Pro-Am category early on in his first stint, Vaxivière made a triple overtake on Reshad de Gerus, Pietro Fittipaldi, and Théo Pourchaire with 50 minutes left. Soon after, he would pass Charles Milesi for third overall before jumping ahead of Pipo Derani on a FCY restart. He caught leader Mathys Jaubert with 25 minutes to go, though a pit stop for fresher tyres and a subsequent safety car left Vaxivière in fourth with two remaining racing laps. In those, he overtook Fittipaldi, Milesi, and Jaubert to take victory, the second overall win for a Pro-Am car in the history of the series.

== Racing record ==
=== Racing career summary ===
Season	Series	Team	Races	Wins	Poles	F/Laps	Podiums	Points	Position
2010	MitJet Series	N/A	12	0	?	0	1	180	9th
2011	French F4 Championship	Auto Sport Academy	14	3	6	5	10	146	**1st**
2012	Eurocup Formula Renault 2.0	Tech 1 Racing	14	0	0	0	0	1	29th
2012	Formula Renault 2.0 Alps	Tech 1 Racing	7	0	0	0	1	29	14th
2012	2e Grand Prix Electrique	L'Hebdo+	2	0	0	0	1	N/A	N/A
2012	French GT Championship	Graff Racing	2	0	0	0	0	0	NC†
2012	V de V Challenge Endurance Moderne - Proto	CD Sport	1	0	0	0	0	0	NC†
2013	Eurocup Formula Renault 2.0	Tech 1 Racing	12	2	2	2	2	57	10th
2013	Formula Renault 2.0 Alps	Tech 1 Racing	4	0	0	0	0	20	18th
2013	Porsche Carrera Cup France	Pro GT by Alméras	4	1	2	3	4	0	NC†
2013	V de V Endurance GT Tourisme - GTV2	Porsche Alméras	1	0	0	0	0	0	NC†
2013	V de V Endurance GT Tourisme - GTV3	Porsche Alméras	?	?	?	?	?	0	NC†
2013	V de V Michelin Endurance Series - Tourisme	Porsche Alméras	4	0	0	0	0	36	17th
2014	Formula Renault 3.5 Series	Lotus	13	0	0	0	2	83	8th
2014	FIA World Endurance Championship - LMGTE Am	Prospeed Competition	7	0	1	0	1	58	9th
2014	European Le Mans Series - GTC	Pro GT by Alméras	1	0	0	0	0	8	22nd
2014	Championnat de France FFSA GT	Team Martinet - Alméras	2	0	0	0	0	0	NC†
2014	24 Hours of Dubai - A6-Pro	Crubilé Sport	1	0	0	0	0	N/A	12th
2015	Formula Renault 3.5 Series	Lotus	17	3	5	5	10	234	**2nd**
2015	Formula Renault 2.0 Alps	ARTA Engineering	2	0	0	0	1	0	NC†
2015–16	Andros Trophy - Électrique	Loxam	13	6	2	1	9	362	**1st**
2016	Formula V8 3.5 Series	SMP Racing	18	2	0	2	7	175	6th
2016	GT3 Le Mans Cup	Classic & Modern Racing	3	0	0	0	1	15.5	14th
2016–17	Asian Le Mans Series - GT	DH Racing	3	1	0	0	2	50	4th
2017	FIA World Endurance Championship - LMP2	TDS Racing	8	0	0	0	1	53	16th
2017	GP3 Series	DAMS	4	0	0	0	0	0	21st
2017	V de V Endurance Series - PFV	R-ace GP	2	0	0	0	2	36	16th
2018	Blancpain GT Series Endurance Cup - Pro	R-Motorsport	5	1	2	0	1	29	13th
2018	European Le Mans Series - LMP2	TDS Racing	4	0	0	0	2	38	10th
2018	VLN Endurance	Aston Martin Test Centre	4	0	0	0	0	10.34	474th
2018	Nürburgring Langstrecken Serie - SP8	Aston Martin Test Centre	?	?	?	?	?	0	NC†
2018–19	FIA World Endurance Championship - LMP2	TDS Racing	8	0	0	3	1	66	8th
2019	Blancpain GT Series Endurance Cup - Pro	R-Motorsport	5	0	0	0	0	1	34th
2019	Intercontinental GT Challenge	R-Motorsport	1	0	0	0	1	N/A	NC†
2019	Bathurst 12 Hours - Class A	R-Motorsport	1	0	0	0	1	N/A	**2nd**
2019	European Le Mans Series - LMP2	RLR MSport	1	0	0	0	0	0	36th
2019	24 Hours of Nürburgring - SP9	KCMG	1	0	0	0	0	N/A	DNF
2019	VLN Series - SP9 Pro	KCMG	4	0	0	0	0	9.75	32nd
2019	IMSA Sportscar Championship - DPi	Konica Minolta Cadillac	2	0	0	0	2	64	22nd
2020	24 Hours of Le Mans - LMP2	Panis Racing	1	0	0	0	1	N/A	**3rd**
2020	Mitjet International	MV2S Racing	4	4	3	3	4	0	NC†
2020	Intercontinental GT Challenge	Team WRT	1	0	0	0	0	0	NC†
2020	GT World Challenge Europe Endurance Cup	Belgian Audi Club Team WRT	2	1	0	0	1	25	13th
2020	24 Hours of Nürburgring - SP9	GetSpeed Performance	1	0	0	0	0	N/A	DNF
2020	Nürburgring Endurance Series - SP9 Pro	GetSpeed Performance	2	0	0	0	0	9.88	51st
2020	Nürburgring Endurance Series - SP9 Pro-Am	GetSpeed Performance	1	0	0	0	1	6.25	9th
2021	FIA World Endurance Championship - Hypercar	Alpine Elf Matmut	6	0	1	0	6	128	**3rd**
2021	IMSA SportsCar Championship - LMP2	Tower Motorsport by Starworks	1	0	0	0	1	0	NC†
2021	24H GT Series - GT3 Pro	Racetivity	1	0	0	0	0	0	NC†
2021	24 Hours of Nürburgring - SP9	Mercedes-AMG Team GetSpeed	1	0	0	0	0	N/A	7th
2022	FIA World Endurance Championship - Hypercar	Alpine Elf Team	6	2	0	1	5	144	**2nd**
2022	24H GT Series - GT3 Pro-Am	Racetivity	1	0	0	0	0	0	NC†
2023	FIA World Endurance Championship - LMP2	Alpine Elf Team	7	0	0	0	2	83	7th
2023	24 Hours of Le Mans - LMP2	Alpine Elf Team	1	0	0	0	0	N/A	4th
2023	European Le Mans Series - LMP2 Pro-Am	AF Corse	6	2	0	0	5	110	**1st**
2023	IMSA SportsCar Championship - LMP2	AF Corse	2	0	0	0	1	306	24th
2023–24	Asian Le Mans Series - LMP2	AF Corse	5	0	0	1	2	52	6th
2024	FIA World Endurance Championship - Hypercar	Alpine Endurance Team	8	0	0	0	1	21	22nd
2024	European Le Mans Series - LMP2 Pro-Am	AF Corse	6	2	0	2	3	98	**1st**
2024	IMSA SportsCar Championship - LMP2	Richard Mille AF Corse	1	0	0	0	0	211	56th
2024–25	Asian Le Mans Series - LMP2	AF Corse	6	1	0	0	3	86	**3rd**
2025	IMSA SportsCar Championship - LMP2	AF Corse	2	0	0	0	0	537	38th
2025	European Le Mans Series - LMP2 Pro-Am	AF Corse	6	1	0	0	2	74	4th
2025	FIA World Endurance Championship - Hypercar	Alpine Endurance Team	Reserve driver						
2025–26	Asian Le Mans Series - LMP2	ARC Bratislava	6	0	0	0	0	4	17th
2026	IMSA SportsCar Championship - LMP2	AF Corse USA	1	0	0	0	0	199	42nd
2026	European Le Mans Series - LMP2 Pro-Am	AF Corse	6	1	0	0	2	67	**3rd**
2026	24 Hours of Le Mans - LMP2 Pro-Am	AF Corse	1	0	0	0	1	N/A	**2nd**
2026	GT World Challenge Europe Endurance Cup	AF Corse	1	0	0	0	0	0	NC
2026–27	Asian Le Mans Series - LMP2	CLX Motorsport							

^{†} As Vaxivière was a guest driver, he was ineligible to score points. ^{*} Season still in progress.

=== Complete French F4 Championship results ===
(key) (Races in bold indicate pole position) (Races in italics indicate fastest lap)

Year	1	2	3	4	5	6	7	8	9	10	11	12	13	14	Pos	Points
2011	LÉD; 1; 3	LÉD; 2; 5	NOG; 1; 4	NOG; 2; 3	**PAU**; **1**; 1	**PAU**; **2**; 1	**VDV**; **1** Ret	**VDV**; **2**; 1	SPA; 1; 4	SPA; 2; 3	**ALB**; **1**; 2	**ALB**; **2**; 3	LEC; 1; 3	LEC; 2; 2	1st	146

=== Complete Eurocup Formula Renault 2.0 results ===
(key) (Races in bold indicate pole position) (Races in italics indicate fastest lap)

Year	Entrant	1	2	3	4	5	6	7	8	9	10	11	12	13	14	Pos	Points
2012	Tech 1 Racing	ALC; 1; 16	ALC; 2; 22	SPA; 1; 20	SPA; 2 NC	NÜR; 1 Ret	NÜR; 2; 14	MSC; 1; 25	MSC; 2 Ret	HUN; 1; 23	HUN; 2; 20	LEC; 1 Ret	LEC; 2 Ret	CAT; 1; 27	CAT; 2; 10	29th	1
2013	Tech 1 Racing	**ALC**; **1**; 1	**ALC**; **2**; 1	SPA; 1; 11	SPA; 2; 14	MSC; 1; 7	MSC; 2; 12	RBR; 1; 27	RBR; 2; 21	HUN; 1; 11	HUN; 2; 15	LEC; 1; 16	LEC; 2; 29	CAT; 1	CAT; 2	10th	57

=== Complete Formula Renault 2.0 Alps Series results ===
(key) (Races in bold indicate pole position; races in italics indicate fastest lap)

Year	Team	1	2	3	4	5	6	7	8	9	10	11	12	13	14	15	16	Pos	Points
2012	Tech 1 Racing	MNZ; 1 Ret	MNZ; 2; 12	PAU; 1; 4	PAU; 2; 3	IMO; 1 Ret	IMO; 2; 14	SPA; 1	SPA; 2	RBR; 1	RBR; 2	MUG; 1	MUG; 2	CAT; 1; 18	CAT; 2; 9			14th	29
2013	Tech 1 Racing	VLL; 1 Ret	VLL; 2; 5	IMO1; 1; 8	IMO1; 2; 7	SPA; 1	SPA; 2	MNZ; 1	MNZ; 2	MIS; 1	MIS; 2	MUG; 1	MUG; 2	IMO2; 1	IMO2; 2			18th	20
2015	ARTA Engineering	IMO; 1	IMO; 2	PAU; 1; 10	PAU; 2; 3	RBR; 1	RBR; 2	RBR; 3	SPA; 1	SPA; 2	MNZ; 1	MNZ; 2	MNZ; 3	MIS; 1	MIS; 2	JER; 1	JER; 2	NC†	0

† As Vaxivière was a guest driver, he was ineligible for points

=== Complete Formula V8 3.5 Series results ===
(key) (Races in bold indicate pole position) (Races in italics indicate fastest lap)

Year	Team	1	2	3	4	5	6	7	8	9	10	11	12	13	14	15	16	17	18	Pos.	Points
2014	Lotus	MNZ; 1; 17†	MNZ; 2; 16	ALC; 1; 7	ALC; 2; 8	MON; 1 Ret	SPA; 1	SPA; 2	MSC; 1	MSC; 2	NÜR; 1; 13	NÜR; 2; 2	HUN; 1; 5	HUN; 2; 7	LEC; 1; 3	LEC; 2; 6	JER; 1; 4	JER; 2; 8		8th	83
2015	Lotus	**ALC**; **1**; 4	ALC; 2; 1	MON; 1 Ret	**SPA**; **1**; 1	SPA; 2; 3	HUN; 1; 4	**HUN**; **2**; 2	RBR; 1; 6	**RBR**; **2**; 1	SIL; 1; 3	**SIL**; **2**; 2	NÜR; 1; 4	NÜR; 2; 11	BUG; 1; 10	BUG; 2; 2	JER; 1; 3	JER; 2; 3		2nd	234
2016	SMP Racing	ALC; 1; 2	ALC; 2 Ret	HUN; 1; 5	HUN; 2; 5	SPA; 1 Ret	SPA; 2; 1	**LEC**; **1**; 5	LEC; 2 Ret	**SIL**; **1**; 2	**SIL**; **2**; 7	RBR; 1; 1	RBR; 2; 6	MNZ; 1; 3	MNZ; 2 Ret	JER; 1; 3	JER; 2; 3	CAT; 1 Ret	CAT; 2 Ret	6th	175

=== Complete FIA World Endurance Championship results ===
Year	Entrant	Class	Car	Engine	1	2	3	4	5	6	7	8	9	Rank	Points
2014	Prospeed Competition	LMGTE Am	Porsche 997 GT3-RSR	Porsche 4.0 L Flat-6	SIL; Ret	SPA; 6	LMS							9th	58
2014	Prospeed Competition	LMGTE Am	Porsche 911 RSR	Porsche 4.0 L Flat-6				**COA**; 7	FUJ; 3	SHA; 4	BHR; 7	SÃO; 5		9th	58
2017	TDS Racing	LMP2	Oreca 07	Gibson GK428 4.2 L V8	SIL; 3	SPA	LMS; Ret	NÜR; 8	MEX; 7	COA; 7	FUJ; 4	SHA; 6	BHR; 9	16th	53
2018–19	TDS Racing	LMP2	Oreca 07	Gibson GK428 4.2 L V8	SPA; 4	LMS; DSQ	SIL; 7	FUJ; 4	SHA; Ret	SEB; NC	SPA; 4	**LMS**; 3		8th	66
2021	Alpine Elf Matmut	Hypercar	Alpine A480	Gibson GL458 4.5 L V8	SPA; 2	**ALG**; 3	MNZ; 2	LMS; 3	BHR; 3	BHR; 3				3rd	128
2022	Alpine Elf Team	Hypercar	Alpine A480	Gibson GL458 4.5 L V8	**SEB**; 1	SPA; 2	LMS; 4	MNZ; 1	FUJ; 3	BHR; 3				2nd	144
2023	Alpine Elf Team	LMP2	Oreca 07	Gibson GK428 4.2 L V8	SEB; 8	ALG; 8	SPA; 7	LMS; 3	MNZ; 2	FUJ; 5	BHR; 7			7th	83
2024	Alpine Endurance Team	Hypercar	Alpine A424	Alpine 3.4 L Turbo V6	QAT; 11	IMO; 16	SPA; 12	LMS; Ret	SÃO; 10	COA; 9	FUJ; 3	BHR; 9		22nd	21

=== Complete European Le Mans Series results ===
Year	Entrant	Class	Chassis	Engine	1	2	3	4	5	6	Rank	Points
2014	Pro GT by Alméras	GTC	Porsche 997 GT3-R	Porsche 4.0 L Flat-6	SIL	IMO	RBR; 6	LEC	EST		22nd	8
2018	TDS Racing	LMP2	Oreca 07	Gibson GK428 4.2 L V8	LEC; 2	MNZ; 2	RBR; 9				10th	38
2018	Racing Engineering	LMP2	Oreca 07	Gibson GK428 4.2 L V8				SIL; Ret	SPA	ALG	10th	38
2019	RLR MSport	LMP2	Oreca 07	Gibson GK428 4.2 L V8	LEC	MNZ	CAT	SIL; Ret	SPA	ALG	36th	0
2023	AF Corse	LMP2 Pro-Am	Oreca 07	Gibson GK428 4.2 L V8	CAT; 2	LEC; 3	ARA; 1	SPA; 4	ALG; 3	ALG; 1	1st	110
2024	AF Corse	LMP2 Pro-Am	Oreca 07	Gibson GK428 4.2 L V8	CAT; 1	LEC; 4	IMO; 2	SPA; 1	MUG; 7	ALG; 4	1st	98
2025	AF Corse	LMP2 Pro-Am	Oreca 07	Gibson GK428 4.2 L V8	CAT; 1	LEC; 8	IMO; 5	SPA; 4	SIL; 3	ALG; 6	4th	74
2026	AF Corse	LMP2 Pro-Am	Oreca 07	Gibson GK428 4.2 L V8	CAT; 2	LEC; 6	IMO; 5	SPA; 1	SIL; 7	ALG; 11	3rd	67

=== Complete Asian Le Mans Series results ===
(key) (Races in bold indicate pole position) (Races in italics indicate fastest lap)

Year	Team	Class	Car	Engine	1	2	3	4	5	6	Pos.	Points
2016–17	DH Racing	GT	Ferrari 488 GT3	Ferrari F154CB 3.9 L V8	ZHU	FUJ; 1	BUR; 3	SEP; 5			4th	50
2023–24	AF Corse	LMP2	Oreca 07	Gibson GK428 4.2 L V8	SEP; 1; 2	SEP; 2; 4	DUB; 1; 8	ABU; 1; 2	ABU; 2; 12		6th	52
2024–25	AF Corse	LMP2	Oreca 07	Gibson GK428 4.2 L V8	SEP; 1; 2	SEP; 2; 6	DUB; 1; 4	DUB; 2; 3	ABU; 1; 6	ABU; 2; 1	3rd	86
2025–26	ARC Bratislava	LMP2	Oreca 07	Gibson GK428 4.2 L V8	SEP; 1; 10	SEP; 2; 10	DUB; 1 Ret	DUB; 2; 9	ABU; 1 Ret	ABU; 2 Ret	17th	4

=== 24 Hours of Le Mans results ===
Year	Team	Co-Drivers	Car	Class	Laps	Pos.	Class Pos.
2017	(France) TDS Racing	(France) François Perrodo (France) Emmanuel Collard	Oreca 07-Gibson	LMP2	213	DNF	DNF
2018	(France) TDS Racing	(France) François Perrodo (France) Loïc Duval	Oreca 07-Gibson	LMP2	366	DSQ	DSQ
2019	(France) TDS Racing	(France) François Perrodo (France) Loïc Duval	Oreca 07-Gibson	LMP2	366	8th	**3rd**
2020	(France) Panis Racing	(France) Nico Jamin (France) Julien Canal	Oreca 07-Gibson	LMP2	368	7th	**3rd**
2021	(France) Alpine Elf Matmut	(Brazil) André Negrão (France) Nicolas Lapierre	Alpine A480-Gibson	Hypercar	367	**3rd**	**3rd**
2022	(France) Alpine Elf Team	(Brazil) André Negrão (France) Nicolas Lapierre	Alpine A480-Gibson	Hypercar	362	23rd	5th
2023	(France) Alpine Elf Team	(France) Julien Canal (France) Charles Milesi	Oreca 07-Gibson	LMP2	327	12th	4th
2024	(France) Alpine Endurance Team	(France) Nicolas Lapierre (Germany) Mick Schumacher	Alpine A424	Hypercar	88	DNF	DNF
2025	(Italy) AF Corse	(Portugal) António Félix da Costa (France) François Perrodo	Oreca 07-Gibson	LMP2	364	26th	9th
2025	(Italy) AF Corse	(Portugal) António Félix da Costa (France) François Perrodo	Oreca 07-Gibson	LMP2 Pro-Am	364	26th	4th
2026	(Italy) AF Corse	(United Kingdom) Ben Barnicoat (France) François Perrodo	Oreca 07-Gibson	LMP2	357	23rd	9th
2026	(Italy) AF Corse	(United Kingdom) Ben Barnicoat (France) François Perrodo	Oreca 07-Gibson	LMP2 Pro-Am	357	23rd	**2nd**

=== Complete GP3 Series results ===
(key) (Races in bold indicate pole position) (Races in italics indicate fastest lap)

Year	Entrant	1	2	3	4	5	6	7	8	9	10	11	12	13	14	15	16	Pos	Points
2017	DAMS	CAT; FEA	CAT; SPR	RBR; FEA	RBR; SPR	SIL; FEA	SIL; SPR	HUN; FEA; 12	HUN; SPR; 12	SPA; FEA; Ret	SPA; SPR; 15	MNZ; FEA	MNZ; SPR	JER; FEA	JER; SPR	YMC; FEA	YMC; SPR	22nd	0

=== Complete GT World Challenge Europe results ===
==== GT World Challenge Europe Endurance Cup ====
(key) (Races in bold indicate pole position; races in italics indicate fastest lap)

Year	Team	Car	Class	1	2	3	4	5	6	7	Pos.	Points
2018	R-Motorsport	Aston Martin V12 Vantage GT3	Pro	MNZ; Ret	**SIL**; 1	**LEC**; 31	SPA; 6H; 13	SPA; 12H; 11	SPA; 24H; 9	CAT; 40	13th	29
2019	R-Motorsport	Aston Martin V12 Vantage GT3	Pro	MNZ; 37	SIL; 17	LEC; 10	SPA; 6H; 64	SPA; 12H; 64	SPA; 24H; Ret	CAT; 17	34th	1
2020	Belgian Audi Club Team WRT	Audi R8 LMS Evo	Pro	IMO; 1	NÜR	SPA; 6H; 29	SPA; 12H; 21	SPA; 24H; 14	LEC		13th	25
2026	AF Corse	Ferrari 296 GT3 Evo	Pro-Am	LEC	MNZ	SPA; 6H; 66†	SPA; 12H; 66†	SPA; 24H; Ret	NÜR	ALG	NC	0

=== Complete IMSA SportsCar Championship results ===
(key) (Races in bold indicate pole position; races in italics indicate fastest lap)

Year	Entrant	Class	Make	Engine	1	2	3	4	5	6	7	8	9	10	Rank	Points
2019	Konica Minolta Cadillac	DPi	Cadillac DPi-V.R	Cadillac 5.5 L V8	DAY	SEB; 2	LBH	MDO	DET	WGL	MOS	ELK	LGA	PET; 2	22nd	64
2021	Tower Motorsport by Starworks	LMP2	Oreca 07	Gibson GK428 4.2 L V8	DAY; 2†	SEB	WGL	WGL	ELK	LGA	PET				NC†	0†
2023	AF Corse	LMP2	Oreca 07	Gibson GK428 4.2 L V8	DAY; 3†	SEB	LGA	WGL	ELK	IMS	PET; 4				24th	306
2024	Richard Mille AF Corse	LMP2	Oreca 07	Gibson GK428 4.2 L V8	DAY; 12	SEB	WGL	MOS	ELK	IMS	PET				56th	211
2025	AF Corse	LMP2	Oreca 07	Gibson GK428 4.2 L V8	DAY; 7	SEB	WGL; 6	MOS	ELK	IMS	PET				38th	537
2026	AF Corse USA	LMP2	Oreca 07	Gibson GK428 4.2 L V8	DAY; 13	SEB	WGL	MOS	ELK	IMS	PET				42nd	199

^{†} Points only counted towards the Michelin Endurance Cup, and not the overall LMP2 Championship.

Sporting positions
Preceded by Stoffel Vandoorne	French F4 Championship; Champion; 2011	Succeeded by Alexandre Baron
Preceded by Christophe Ferrier	Andros Trophy Électrique; Champion; 2015-16	Succeeded by Christophe Ferrier
Preceded by Charlie Eastwood; Salih Yoluç	European Le Mans Series; LMP2 Pro-Am Champion; 2023-2024; With: François Perrodo (2023-24) & Alessio Rovera (2024)	Succeeded by Incumbent
