= 2012 French F4 Championship =

French motorsport season

Seasons
- ← 2011 2013 →

The 2012 French F4 Championship season was the twentieth season of the series for 1600cc Formula Renault machinery, and the second season to run under the guise of the French F4 Championship. The series began on 28 April at Circuit de Lédenon and ended on 28 October at Circuit Paul Ricard, after seven rounds and fourteen races.

== Driver lineup ==
No.	Driver	Rounds
1	(Switzerland) Darius Oskoui	All
2	(France) Victor Sendin	All
3	(France) Joffrey de Narda	All
4	(France) Florian Latorre	All
5	(France) Laurent Pellier	All
6	(France) Enzo Guibbert	All
7	(France) Simon Tirman	All
8	(France) Alexandre Baron	All
9	(France) Marco de Peretti	All
10	(France) Nicolas Jamin	All
11	(France) Paul Thenot	All
12	(France) Simon Gachet	All
14	(Spain) Fran Rueda	All
15	(Portugal) Francisco Abreu	1–4, 6
16	(Russia) Egor Orudzhev	1–6
17	(Russia) Denis Korneev	All
18	(Russia) Stanislav Safronov	1–3
18	(France) Julien Poncelet	6
18	(France) Norman Nato	7

== Race calendar and results ==
Round		Circuit	Date	Pole position	Fastest lap	Winning driver
1	R1	(France) Circuit de Lédenon, Lédenon	28 April	(France) Alexandre Baron	(France) Alexandre Baron	(France) Victor Sendin
1	R2	(France) Circuit de Lédenon, Lédenon	29 April	(France) Alexandre Baron	(France) Alexandre Baron	(France) Alexandre Baron
2	R1	(France) Circuit de Pau, Pau	12 May	(France) Alexandre Baron	(France) Alexandre Baron	(France) Alexandre Baron
2	R2	(France) Circuit de Pau, Pau	13 May	(France) Alexandre Baron	(France) Alexandre Baron	(France) Victor Sendin
3	R1	(France) Circuit du Val de Vienne, Le Vigeant	23 June	(France) Enzo Guibbert	(France) Simon Tirman	(France) Alexandre Baron
3	R2	(France) Circuit du Val de Vienne, Le Vigeant	24 June	(France) Alexandre Baron	(France) Alexandre Baron	(France) Alexandre Baron
4	R1	(France) Circuit de Nevers Magny-Cours	14 July	(France) Alexandre Baron	(France) Simon Tirman	(France) Alexandre Baron
4	R2	(France) Circuit de Nevers Magny-Cours	15 July	(France) Alexandre Baron	(France) Alexandre Baron	(France) Alexandre Baron
5	R1	(Spain) Circuito de Navarra, Los Arcos	8 September	(France) Simon Tirman	(France) Enzo Guibbert	(France) Alexandre Baron
5	R2	(Spain) Circuito de Navarra, Los Arcos	9 September	(France) Alexandre Baron	(France) Alexandre Baron	(France) Alexandre Baron
6	R1	(France) Bugatti Circuit, Le Mans	29 September	(France) Alexandre Baron	(Russia) Egor Orudzhev	(France) Simon Tirman
6	R2	(France) Bugatti Circuit, Le Mans	30 September	(France) Alexandre Baron	(Russia) Egor Orudzhev	(France) Simon Tirman
7	R1	(France) Circuit Paul Ricard, Le Castellet	27 October	(Switzerland) Darius Oskoui	(Switzerland) Darius Oskoui	(Switzerland) Darius Oskoui
7	R2	(France) Circuit Paul Ricard, Le Castellet	28 October	(France) Alexandre Baron	(France) Alexandre Baron	(France) Alexandre Baron

== Championship standings ==
- Points are awarded to the top ten drivers in both races on a 25–18–15–12–10–8–6–4–2–1 basis. Additional points are awarded to the driver achieving pole position and fastest lap in each race. Only a driver's best twelve results count towards the championship.

Pos	Driver	LÉD (France)		PAU (France)		VDV (France)		MAG (France)		NAV (Spain)		LMS (France)		LEC (France)		Points
1	(France) Alexandre Baron	**3**	**1**	**1**	**10**	1	**1**	**1**	**1**	1	**1**	**2**	**11**	DNS	**1**	278
2	(France) Simon Tirman	2	7	12	3	3	3	6	6	**2**	2	1	1	6	12	182
3	(France) Simon Gachet	Ret	2	2	2	4	2	8	3	7	14	7	4	7	3	148
4	(France) Enzo Guibbert	Ret	3	4	4	**2**	4	2	4	6	5	8	6	9	10	134
5	(France) Victor Sendin	1	4	9	1	14	Ret	3	8	8	6	4	3	Ret	14	122
6	(Switzerland) Darius Oskoui	5	8	6	Ret	7	Ret	4	2	5	13	15	7	**1**	4	113
7	(France) Nicolas Jamin	8	15	10	6	6	12	7	5	3	3	9	Ret	3	2	102
8	(France) Florian Latorre	Ret	5	5	5	8	7	9	9	11	9	5	5	8	5	80
9	(France) Joffrey de Narda	4	6	Ret	8	13	6	13	7	14	4	12	14	2	6	76
10	(Russia) Egor Orudzhev	14	9	7	Ret	5	Ret	5	14	4	11	3	2			75
11	(Russia) Denis Korneev	13	Ret	11	12	15	8	10	11	10	7	6	8	5	7	40
12	(Portugal) Francisco Abreu	11	16	3	Ret	Ret	5	12	Ret			13	10			26
13	(Spain) Fran Rueda	7	14	8	7	9	11	11	13	12	8	11	9	Ret	13	24
14	(France) Marco de Peretti	9	12	Ret	13	16	10	16	10	13	10	10	DSQ	4	9	20
15	(France) Laurent Pellier	6	13	Ret	9	12	9	14	Ret	9	12	14	13	10	11	15
16	(France) Paul Thenot	12	11	Ret	Ret	11	14	15	12	DNS	15	Ret	12	Ret	8	4
17	(Russia) Stanislav Safronov	10	10	13	11	10	13									3
Guest drivers ineligible for points
—	(France) Julien Poncelet											Ret	15			0
—	(France) Norman Nato													DNS	DNS	0
Pos	Driver	LÉD (France)		PAU (France)		VDV (France)		MAG (France)		NAV (Spain)		LMS (France)		LEC (France)		Points

Colour	Result
Gold	Winner
Silver	Second place
Bronze	Third place
Green	Points classification
Blue	Non-points classification
Blue	Non-classified finish (NC)
Purple	Retired, not classified (Ret)
Red	Did not qualify (DNQ)
Red	Did not pre-qualify (DNPQ)
Black	Disqualified (DSQ)
White	Did not start (DNS)
White	Withdrew (WD)
White	Race cancelled (C)
Blank	Did not practice (DNP)
Blank	Did not arrive (DNA)
Blank	Excluded (EX)

**Bold** – Pole
Italics – Fastest Lap
