= Peter Boumphrey =

British alpine skier (1919–2004)

Personal information
- Nationality: British
- Born: 10 April 1919; Rochford, England
- Died: 10 November 2004 (aged 85); Fayence, France

Sport
- Sport: Alpine skiing

Peter Boumphrey (10 April 1919 – 10 November 2004) was a British alpine skier. He competed in the men's downhill at the 1948 Winter Olympics. Boumphrey was an officer in the British Army. Boumphrey went on to build the Isola 2000 ski resort in the Southern French Alps in the early 1970s. He died in Fayence on 10 November 2004, at the age of 85.
