= 2011 French F4 Championship =

French motorsport season

Seasons
- ← 2010 2012 →

The 2011 French F4 Championship season was the nineteenth season of the series for 1600cc Formula Renault machinery, and the first season to run under the guise of French F4 Championship. The series began on 9 April at Circuit de Lédenon and ended on 30 October at Circuit Paul Ricard, after seven rounds and fourteen races.

== Driver lineup ==
No.	Driver	Rounds
1	(France) Andrea Pizzitola	All
2	(France) Marie Baus-Coppens	All
3	(France) Alexandre Mantovani	All
4	(France) Aurélien Panis	All
5	(France) Cyril Raymond	All
6	(Brazil) Jean Antunes	1
6	(Lithuania) Jonas Ramanauskas	5
6	(France) Maël le Gall	7
7	(France) Matthieu Vaxivière	All
8	(Poland) Tomasz Krzeminski	All
9	(Finland) Patrick Kujala	All
10	(Andorra) Alex Loan Ventura	All
11	(Belgium) Kévin Balthazar	All
12	(France) Paul Petit	All
14	(Spain) Francisco Javier Suárez	All
15	(France) Pierre Gasly	All
16	(India) Parth Ghorpade	All
17	(United Kingdom) Josh Fielding	1–3
17	(France) Sébastien Ogier	7
18	(France) Tristan Papavoine	All
19	(Spain) Victor Colomé	All
20	(Germany) Alexander Boquoi	All
21	(France) Pierre Sancinéna	All
22	(France) Jordan Perroy	All

== Race calendar and results ==
All races supported the FFSA GT Championship, except Pau (FIA Formula 3 International Trophy) and Spa-Francorchamps (24 Hours of Spa)

Round		Circuit	Date	Pole position	Fastest lap	Winning driver
1	R1	(France) Circuit de Lédenon, Lédenon	9 April	(France) Cyril Raymond	(France) Cyril Raymond	(France) Cyril Raymond
1	R2	(France) Circuit de Lédenon, Lédenon	10 April	(France) Cyril Raymond	(France) Cyril Raymond	(France) Andrea Pizzitola
2	R1	(France) Circuit Paul Armagnac, Nogaro	24 April	(France) Pierre Sancinéna	(France) Matthieu Vaxivière	(France) Pierre Sancinéna
2	R2	(France) Circuit Paul Armagnac, Nogaro	25 April	(France) Pierre Sancinéna	(France) Matthieu Vaxivière	(France) Pierre Sancinéna
3	R1	(France) Circuit de Pau, Pau	21 May	(France) Matthieu Vaxivière	(France) Pierre Gasly	(France) Matthieu Vaxivière
3	R2	(France) Circuit de Pau, Pau	22 May	(France) Matthieu Vaxivière	(France) Matthieu Vaxivière	(France) Matthieu Vaxivière
4	R1	(France) Circuit du Val de Vienne, Le Vigeant	25 June	(France) Matthieu Vaxivière	(France) Andrea Pizzitola	(France) Andrea Pizzitola
4	R2	(France) Circuit du Val de Vienne, Le Vigeant	26 June	(France) Matthieu Vaxivière	(France) Matthieu Vaxivière	(France) Matthieu Vaxivière
5	R1	(Belgium) Circuit de Spa-Francorchamps, Spa	29 July	(France) Pierre Sancinéna	(Finland) Patrick Kujala	(Finland) Patrick Kujala
5	R2	(Belgium) Circuit de Spa-Francorchamps, Spa	30 July	(France) Pierre Sancinéna	(France) Andrea Pizzitola	(France) Pierre Gasly
6	R1	(France) Circuit d'Albi, Albi	3 September	(France) Matthieu Vaxivière	(France) Matthieu Vaxivière	(France) Andrea Pizzitola
6	R2	(France) Circuit d'Albi, Albi	4 September	(France) Matthieu Vaxivière	(France) Tristan Papavoine	(France) Pierre Gasly
7	R1	(France) Circuit Paul Ricard, Le Castellet	29 October	(France) Pierre Gasly	(France) Matthieu Vaxivière	(France) Pierre Gasly
7	R2	(France) Circuit Paul Ricard, Le Castellet	30 October	(France) Pierre Gasly	(France) Aurélien Panis	(France) Pierre Gasly

== Championship standings ==
- Points are awarded to the top ten drivers in both races on a 15–12–10–8–6–5–4–3–2–1 basis. Additional points are awarded to the driver achieving pole position and fastest lap in each race. Only a driver's best twelve results count towards the championship.

Pos	Driver	LÉD (France)		NOG (France)		PAU (France)		VDV (France)		SPA (Belgium)		ALB (France)		LEC (France)		Points
1	(France) Matthieu Vaxivière	3	5	4	3	**1**	**1**	**Ret**	**1**	4	3	**2**	**3**	3	2	146
2	(France) Andrea Pizzitola	2	1	3	2	7	7	1	2	6	5	1	10	16	4	120
3	(France) Pierre Gasly	Ret	Ret	10	10	3	Ret	6	9	2	1	3	1	**1**	**1**	104
4	(France) Pierre Sancinéna	5	2	**1**	**1**	Ret	2	3	Ret	**Ret**	**4**	5	4	4	16	104
5	(Finland) Patrick Kujala	Ret	4	7	12	5	4	7	10	1	2	6	5	6	Ret	76
6	(France) Cyril Raymond	**1**	**12**	5	19	2	Ret	4	3	8	Ret	9	14	11	9	64
7	(France) Alexandre Mantovani	18	3	2	4	10	5	DNS	12	7	8	13	6	2	Ret	61
8	(France) Tristan Papavoine	11	17	DNS	5	4	9	2	4	9	9	4	8	7	Ret	57
9	(Spain) Victor Colomé	4	7	12	8	Ret	Ret	11	5	3	10	8	2	DSQ	EX	47
10	(France) Aurélien Panis	8	18	11	7	Ret	3	5	11	11	7	7	7	20	3	46
11	(Andorra) Alex Loan Ventura	6	Ret	Ret	6	6	Ret	Ret	17	5	6	10	13	9	6	36
12	(Spain) Francisco Javier Suárez	7	9	6	15	Ret	Ret	9	7	18	11	11	Ret	13	8	21
13	(France) Jordan Perroy	12	6	8	11	Ret	6	16	13	13	13	12	Ret	8	10	19
14	(Belgium) Kévin Balthazar	9	8	18	14	11	10	8	8	10	12	17	12	10	11	16
15	(India) Parth Ghorpade	16	13	13	16	8	8	12	14	Ret	15	16	9	14	7	13
16	(France) Paul Petit	13	Ret	17	Ret	Ret	12	10	6	17	14	14	Ret	19	Ret	6
17	(United Kingdom) Josh Fielding	14	10	9	9	Ret	Ret									5
18	(Poland) Tomasz Krzeminski	10	11	14	13	9	11	13	15	12	17	15	11	12	13	3
—	(Germany) Alexander Boquoi	17	16	16	18	12	13	14	16	15	16	DNS	DNS	15	14	0
—	(France) Marie Baus-Coppens	15	15	15	17	13	Ret	15	18	16	Ret	Ret	15	17	15	0
—	(Lithuania) Jonas Ramanauskas									14	18					0
—	(Brazil) Jean Antunes	Ret	14													0
Guest drivers ineligible for points
—	(France) Sébastien Ogier													5	5	0
—	(France) Maël le Gall													18	12	0
Pos	Driver	LÉD (France)		NOG (France)		PAU (France)		VDV (France)		SPA (Belgium)		ALB (France)		LEC (France)		Points

Colour	Result
Gold	Winner
Silver	Second place
Bronze	Third place
Green	Points classification
Blue	Non-points classification
Blue	Non-classified finish (NC)
Purple	Retired, not classified (Ret)
Red	Did not qualify (DNQ)
Red	Did not pre-qualify (DNPQ)
Black	Disqualified (DSQ)
White	Did not start (DNS)
White	Withdrew (WD)
White	Race cancelled (C)
Blank	Did not practice (DNP)
Blank	Did not arrive (DNA)
Blank	Excluded (EX)

**Bold** – Pole
Italics – Fastest Lap
