= Alexandre Baron =

French racing driver

Alexandre Baron (born 6 December 1994) is a French racing driver from Narbonne.

After karting, Baron raced in the French F4 Championship in 2012 and won the championship with nine wins in thirteen races. In 2013, he began the season in Formula Renault 2.0 Eurocup but left the series after eight races. He also made five Formula Renault 2.0 NEC starts. Later that year, he made four starts in the U.S. F2000 National Championship for Belardi Auto Racing and won two races in four starts, including his first start and the season finale.

In 2014, Baron signed with Belardi to race in Indy Lights.

== Racing record ==
=== Career summary ===
Season	Series	Team	Races	Wins	Poles	F/Laps	Podiums	Points	Position
2012	French F4 Championship	Auto Sport Academy	13	9	11	8	11	278	**1st**
2013	Formula Renault 2.0 Northern European Cup	ART Junior Team	4	0	0	0	0	0	54th
2013	Eurocup Formula Renault 2.0	ART Junior Team	8	0	0	0	0	0	27th
2013	U.S. F2000 National Championship	Afterburner Autosport	4	2	1	2	3	0	NC†
2014	Indy Lights	Belardi Auto Racing	8	1	1	0	3	261	10th
2017	U.S. F2000 National Championship	ArmsUp Motorsports	4	0	0	0	0	52	20th
2018	U.S. F2000 National Championship	Swan-RJB Motorsports	7	2	1	4	3	123	12th
2019	U.S. F2000 National Championship	Legacy Autosport	7	0	0	0	1	92	18th

† As he was a guest driver, Baron was ineligible to score points.

=== Complete French F4 Championship results ===
(key) (Races in bold indicate pole position; races in italics indicate fastest lap)

Year	1	2	3	4	5	6	7	8	9	10	11	12	13	14	DC	Points
2012	**LÉD**; **1**; 3	**LÉD**; **2**; 1	**PAU**; **1**; 1	**PAU**; **2**; 10	VDV; 1; 1	**VDV**; **2**; 1	**MAG**; **1**; 1	**MAG**; **2**; 1	NAV; 1; 1	**NAV**; **2**; 1	**LMS**; **1**; 2	**LMS**; **2**; 11	**LEC**; **1** DNS	**LEC**; **2**; 1	1st	278

=== Complete Eurocup Formula Renault 2.0 results ===
(key) (Races in bold indicate pole position; races in italics indicate fastest lap)

Year	Entrant	1	2	3	4	5	6	7	8	9	10	11	12	13	14	DC	Points
2013	ART Junior Team	ALC; 1; 17	ALC; 2; 26	SPA; 1 Ret	SPA; 2; 15	MSC; 1; 12	MSC; 2; 13	RBR; 1; 18	RBR; 2; 20	HUN; 1	HUN; 2	LEC; 1	LEC; 2	CAT; 1	CAT; 2	27th	0

=== Complete Formula Renault 2.0 NEC results ===
(key) (Races in bold indicate pole position) (Races in italics indicate fastest lap)

Year	Entrant	1	2	3	4	5	6	7	8	9	10	11	12	13	14	15	16	17	DC	Points
2013	ART Junior Team	HOC; 1 Ret	HOC; 2 Ret	HOC; 3 DNS	NÜR; 1; 29	NÜR; 2; 28	SIL; 1	SIL; 2	SPA; 1	SPA; 2	ASS; 1	ASS; 2	MST; 1	MST; 2	MST; 3	ZAN; 1	ZAN; 2	ZAN; 3	54th	0

=== Indy Lights ===
Year	Team	1	2	3	4	5	6	7	8	9	10	11	12	13	14	Rank	Points	Ref
2014	Belardi Auto Racing	STP; 10	LBH; 6	ALA; 5	ALA; 2	IND; 5	IND; 3	INDY; 7	POC	TOR; 1*	MOH	MOH	MIL	SNM	SNM	**10th**	**261**	

=== U.S. F2000 National Championship ===
Year	Team	1	2	3	4	5	6	7	8	9	10	11	12	13	14	15	Rank	Points
2017	ArmsUp Motorsports	STP	STP	BAR	BAR	IMS	IMS	ROA	ROA	IOW; 4	TOR; 6	TOR; 13	MOH	MOH	WGL; 11		20th	52
2018	Swan-RJB Motorsports	STP; 22	STP; 1	IMS; 1	IMS; 2	LOR; 21	ROA; 7	ROA; 7	TOR	TOR	MOH	MOH	MOH	POR	POR		12th	123
2019	Legacy Autosport	STP; 21	STP; 4	IMS; 9	IMS; 6	LOR; 2	ROA; 18	ROA; 17	TOR	TOR	MOH	MOH	POR	POR	LAG	LAG	18th	92

^{*} Season still in progress.

Sporting positions
Preceded by Matthieu Vaxivière	French F4; Champion; 2012	Succeeded by Anthoine Hubert
