= Paul Petit (racing driver) =

French racing driver (born 1993)

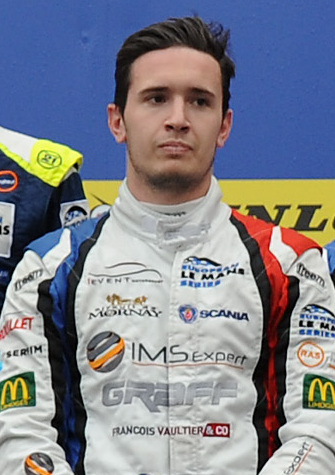
- Petit in 2016
- Nationality: (France) French
- Born: 10 May 1993 (age 33) Guéret, France
- Relatives: Pierre Petit (father)
- Categorisation: FIA Silver

Paul Petit (French: [pɔl pəti]; born 10 May 1993) is a French racing driver who last competed for Team Speedcar in the GT4 European Series.

== Personal life ==
Petit is the son of Pierre Petit, a former racing driver who won the 1982 French Formula Three Championship.

== Career ==
Petit made his single-seater debut in 2011, racing in the FFSA Academy-centrally run French F4 Championship. Following one-off appearances in the Formula Renault 2.0 Alps Series and Peugeot RCZ Racing Cup France in the next two years, Petit spent the following two seasons in the V de V Challenge Endurance for Mornay Motorsport and Graff, respectively. Remaining with Graff for 2016, Petit made his debut in the LMP3 class of the European Le Mans Series alongside Enzo Guibbert and Eric Trouillet. In his rookie season, Petit scored wins at Le Castellet and Spa to end the season runner-up in points after scoring two more podiums.

Stepping up to LMP2 competition for 2017, Petit remained with Graff for his sophomore season in the European Le Mans Series. In his maiden season in the category, Petit finished third at the Red Bull Ring and Le Castellet to finish seventh in points at season's end. Remaining in the LMP2 class of the European Le Mans Series for 2018, Petit switched to Racing Engineering for his third season in the series. In his only season with the team, Petit won at Le Castellet and finished second at the Red Bull Ring to secure third in the standings.

The following year, Petit made his debut in GT3 competition by joining Team WRT to race in the Blancpain GT Series Endurance Cup alongside Shae Davies and Alex MacDowall. Racing in all but two races, Petit scored a best result of sixth and finished the year 16th in the Silver Cup standings. Petit then transitioned to the French GT4 Cup for 2020, joining AKKA ASP Team alongside Thomas Drouet. In his first season in the series, Petit scored Silver Cup wins at Le Castellet and took five more podiums to end the year third in the standings.

In 2021, Petit joined Toksport WRT to race in the Silver Cup of the GT World Challenge Europe Endurance Cup alongside Marvin Dienst and Óscar Tunjo. In his sophomore season in the series, Petit scored class podiums at the 24 Hours of Spa and Nürburgring, and ending the year 13th in points despite missing the finale at Barcelona due to a knee injury.

Returning to the French GT4 Cup for 2022, Petit joined CD Sport to race in the Silver Cup alongside Viny Beltramelli. On his return to the series, Petit scored a best result of sixth in class at Le Castellet to end the year tenth in points. The following year, Petit made his debut in the GT4 European Series with Saintéloc Junior Team alongside Marc Lopez Gutierrez. In his rookie year in the series, Petit scored a best class finish of fourth at Barcelona and ended the year 16th in points.

For his sophomore season in the GT4 European Series, Petit joined AV Racing to race in the Pro-Am class alongside Noam Abramczyk. In their only season together, the pair scored three class podiums which included a win at Misano, as they ended the year third in the class points. Petit switched to Team Speedcar for 2025, joining Grégory Guilvert in the Silver Cup for his third season in the GT4 European Series. In the six-round season, Petit took his first podium at Zandvoort and later scored his an overall win in race one at Spa en route to a seventh-place points finish. Petit remained with the team for 2026, for his second season alongside Guilvert, taking a pair of wins at Misano and Algarve to secure fourth in points.

== Racing record ==
=== Racing career summary ===
Season	Series	Team	Races	Wins	Poles	F/Laps	Podiums	Points	Position
2011	French F4 Championship	FFSA Academy	14	0	0	0	0	6	16th
2012	Formula Renault 2.0 Alps Series	ARTA Engineering	2	0	0	0	0	0	38th
2012	Andros Trophy – Electric		2	0	0	0	1	—N/a	**2nd**
2013	Peugeot RCZ Racing Cup France		3	0	0	0	0	0	NC
2014	V de V Challenge Endurance Proto - Scratch	Mornay Motorsport	7	0	0	0	0	36.5	20th
2015	V de V Challenge Endurance Proto - Scratch	Graff	3	0	0	0	0	19.5	29th
2016	European Le Mans Series – LMP3	Graff	6	2	1	0	4	93	**2nd**
2016	Road to Le Mans – LMP3	Graff	1	0	0	0	0	—N/a	12th
2016	Challenge Endurance LMP3 V de V	Graff	1	0	1	0	1	0	NC
2017	European Le Mans Series – LMP2	Graff	6	0	1	0	2	57	7th
2018	European Le Mans Series – LMP2	Racing Engineering	6	1	0	0	2	66	**3rd**
2019	Blancpain GT Series Endurance Cup	Team WRT	3	0	0	0	0	0	NC
2019	Blancpain GT Series Endurance Cup – Silver	Team WRT	3	0	0	0	0	23	16th
2019	25 Hours VW Fun Cup	Zosh Angevin Jaulin	1	0	0	0	0	—N/a	35th
2020	French GT4 Cup – Silver	AKKA ASP Team	10	2	1	0	7	184	**3rd**
2021	GT World Challenge Europe Endurance Cup	Toksport WRT	4	0	0	0	0	1	32nd
2021	GT World Challenge Europe Endurance Cup – Silver	Toksport WRT	4	0	0	0	2	42	13th
2021	Intercontinental GT Challenge	Toksport WRT	1	0	0	0	0	2	32nd
2022	French GT4 Cup – Silver	CD Sport	12	0	0	0	0	34	10th
2022	Legends Car Cup France		2	0	0	0	0	132	48th
2023	GT4 European Series – Silver	Saintéloc Junior Team	3	0	0	0	0	0	NC
2023	GT4 European Series – Pro-Am	Saintéloc Junior Team	7	0	0	0	0	36	16th
2023	French GT4 Cup – Silver	Saintéloc Junior Team	2	0	0	0	0	6	16th
2024	GT4 European Series – Pro-Am	AV Racing	12	1	1	0	3	132	**3rd**
2025	GT4 European Series – Silver	Team Speedcar	12	1	3	0	2	91	7th
2026	GT4 European Series – Silver	Team Speedcar	12	2	1	0	3	108	4th

=== Complete French F4 Championship results ===
(key) (Races in bold indicate pole position) (Races in italics indicate fastest lap)

Year	1	2	3	4	5	6	7	8	9	10	11	12	13	14	Pos	Points
2011	LÉD; 1; 13	LÉD; 2 Ret	NOG; 1; 17	NOG; 2 Ret	PAU; 1 Ret	PAU; 2; 12	VDV; 1; 10	VDV; 2; 6	SPA; 1; 17	SPA; 2; 14	ALB; 1; 14	ALB; 2 Ret	LEC; 1; 19	LEC; 2 Ret	16th	6

=== Complete European Le Mans Series results ===
(key) (Races in bold indicate pole position. Races in italics indicate fastest race lap in class. Results are overall/class)

Year	Team	Class	Car	Engine	1	2	3	4	5	6	DC	Points
2016	Graff	LMP3	Ligier JS P3	Nissan VK50VE 5.0 L V8	SIL; 3	IMO; Ret	RBR; 4	LEC; 1	**SPA**; 1	EST; 3	2nd	93
2017	Graff	LMP2	Oreca 07	Gibson GK428 4.2 L V8	SIL; 7	**MNZ**; 4	RBR; 3	LEC; 3	SPA; 6	ALG; Ret	7th	57
2018	Racing Engineering	LMP2	Oreca 07	Gibson GK428 4.2 L V8	LEC; 1	MNZ; 5	RBR; 2	SIL; Ret	SPA; 7	POR; 5	3rd	66

=== Complete GT World Challenge Europe results ===
==== GT World Challenge Europe Endurance Cup ====
(Races in bold indicate pole position) (Races in italics indicate fastest lap)

Year	Team	Car	Class	1	2	3	4	5	6	7	Pos.	Points
2019	Belgian Audi Club Team WRT	Audi R8 LMS Evo	Silver	MON; DNS							16th	23
2019	Team WRT	Audi R8 LMS Evo	Silver		SIL; 24	LEC; 19	SPA; 6H; 41	SPA; 12H; 42	SPA; 24H; 34	CAT	16th	23
2021	Toksport WRT	Mercedes-AMG GT3 Evo	Silver	MNZ; 20	LEC; Ret	SPA; 6H; 33	SPA; 12H; 21	SPA; 24H; 13	NÜR; 10	CAT	13th	42

=== Complete GT4 European Series results ===
(key) (Races in bold indicate pole position) (Races in italics indicate fastest lap)

Year	Team	Car	Class	1	2	3	4	5	6	7	8	9	10	11	12	Pos	Points
2023	Saintéloc Junior Team	Audi R8 LMS GT4 Evo	Silver	MNZ; 1; 34	MNZ; 2; 15	LEC; 1 Ret	LEC; 2 WD									NC	0
2023	Saintéloc Junior Team	Audi R8 LMS GT4 Evo	Pro-Am					SPA; 1; 34	SPA; 2 Ret	MIS; 1; 24	MIS; 2 Ret	HOC; 1; 21	HOC; 2 WD	CAT; 1; 24	CAT; 2; 21	16th	36
2024	AV Racing	Porsche 718 Cayman GT4 RS Clubsport	Pro-Am	LEC; 1; 19	LEC; 2; 19	MIS; 1; 16	MIS; 2; 8	SPA; 1; 14	SPA; 2; 47†	HOC; 1; 18	HOC; 2 Ret	MNZ; 1; 24	**MNZ**; **2**; 18	JED; 1 Ret	JED; 2; 17	3rd	132
2025	Team Speedcar	Audi R8 LMS GT4 Evo	Silver	**LEC**; **1** Ret	**LEC**; **2**; 11	**ZAN**; **1**; 3	ZAN; 2; 6	SPA; 1; 1	SPA; 2 Ret	MIS; 1; 7	MIS; 2; 4	NÜR; 1; 9	NÜR; 2; 6	CAT; 1; 10	CAT; 2; 5	7th	91
2026	Team Speedcar	Audi R8 LMS GT4 Evo	Silver	LEC; 1; 5	LEC; 2; 6	MNZ; 1; 4	MNZ; 2; 33	SPA; 1; 38	SPA; 2; 36	MIS; 1; 2	**MIS**; **2**; 1	**ZAN**; **1**; 32	ZAN; 2 Ret	ALG; 1; 10	ALG; 2; 1	4th	108
