= Isola 2000 =

Ski resort in Provence - Alpes - Côte d'Azur, France

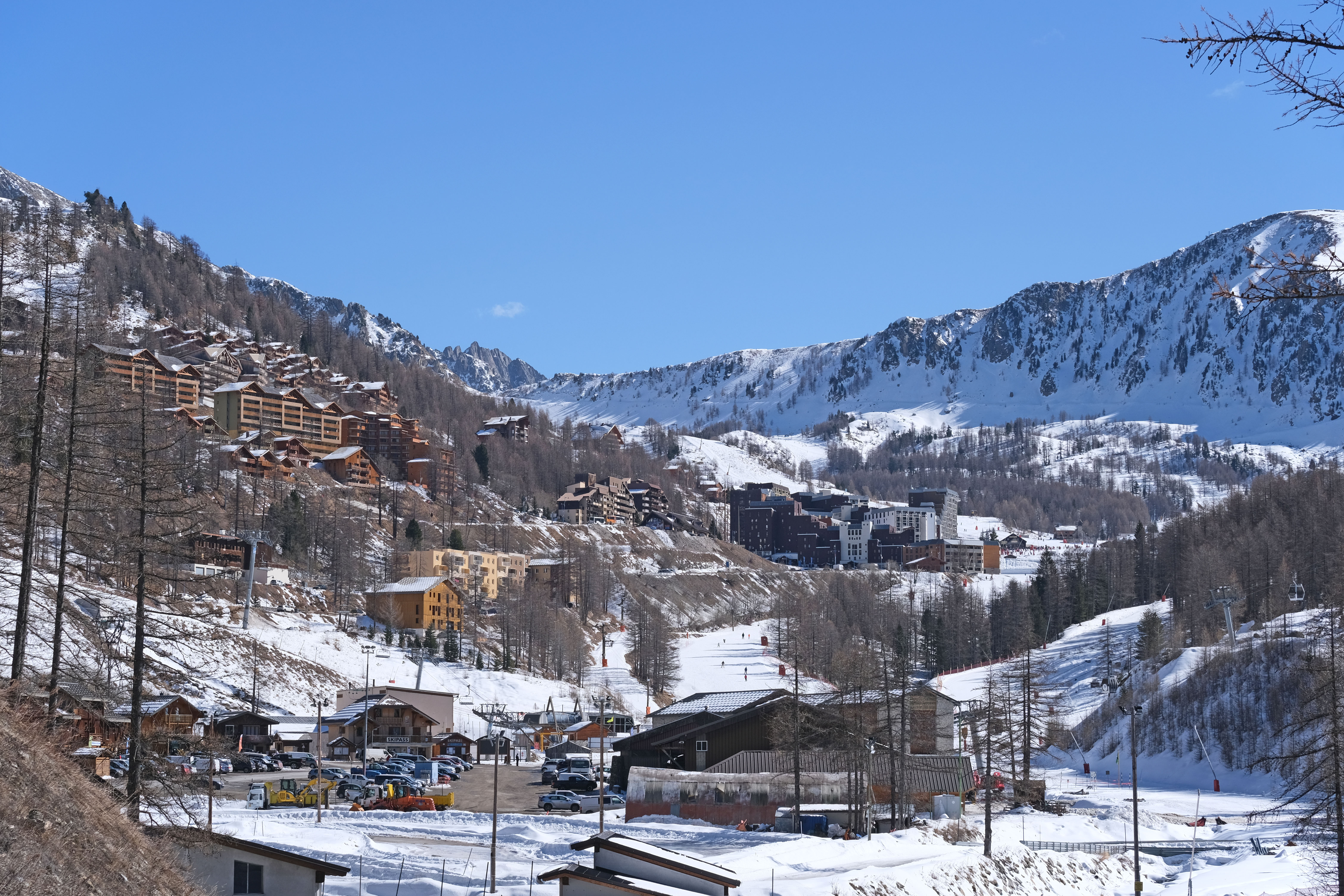
- Isola 2000 in February 2012

- Location within France Location within Provence-Alpes-Côte d'Azur Location within Alps
- Location: Provence-Alpes-Côte d'Azur, France
- Nearest city: Nice, France (90 km (56 mi))
- Coordinates: 44°11′12″N 07°09′30″E
- Vertical: 770 m (2,530 ft)
- Top elevation: 2,610 m (8,560 ft)
- Base elevation: 1,840 m (6,040 ft)
- Skiable area: 20 km^{2} (7.7 sq mi)
- Trails: Black: 4 Red: 11; Blue: 21; Green: 7; 43 Total (120 km (75 mi))
- Lift system: 2 Gondola lifts 9 Chair lifts 10 Button lifts 1 Funicular
- Lift capacity: ~20,000 pph
- Terrain parks: Snowpark, Boardercross
- Snowmaking: 75% (Snow cannons)
- Night skiing: Twice weekly during French holidays
- Website: www.isola2000.com

Isola 2000 is a ski resort in the southern French Alps. It is located on the territory of the commune of Isola, Alpes-Maritimes. It is one of the Stations du Mercantour, along with Auron and St. Dalmas, and is operated by the council of the Alpes-Maritimes. It is located next to the Mercantour National Park, and is about 90 km from Nice, France.

== History ==
=== Origins ===
The area used to be part of the County of Nice in the Kingdom of Piedmont Sardinia. In 1861, with Italy's unification, it became part of the Province of Cuneo. In 1947 following the treaty of Paris the area was given to France.

The idea of a ski resort near the small town of Isola first came from a British Army ex-officer, and Olympic skier, Peter Boumphrey, in the late 1960s, after he discovered a basin in the southern French Alps on a map. The local village of Isola owned the land he wanted to build the resort on – a small town located at an altitude of 900m, with poor prospects for development as citizens were migrating to the cities. As a result of this, the local mayor was happy to allow Boumphrey, and the London-based contractors he persuaded to help him, to build a ski resort above Isola, as the land required was of little value as farmland.

The regional government was concerned not too much about the resort itself, but about the road that was required to access it. Before the resort existed there was a small dirt road up the resort's location, and avalanches were constantly blocking this in the winter, as well as rockslides in the summer. Therefore, the government was interested in building a slightly longer, but safer road to the resort, that could serve Isola 2000, and also another proposed resort, called Azur 2000, that was never built. However, the mayor of Isola was adamant that the road pass through his town, and the British contractors did not want the resort to be any further from Nice Côte d'Azur Airport, a key aspect of the location, so the new route was scrapped, and the old road was upgraded.

In the summer of 1971 the resort officially finished, and had a capacity to sleep 6,000 people. It opened in December that year.

=== Recent developments ===
Over the resort's history, many new lifts have been added and upgraded, such as new 6 seater and 4 seater chair lifts, as well as a new gondola, added in 2006. More accommodation has been built around the original 70s structure, and many bars, restaurants and shops have been established.

The access road to the Mediterranean coast has also been constantly improved by removing corners and adding bridges and tunnels. It is now very possible to make the drive in less than an hour and a half from the nearest city of Nice. There is also a regular bus service from many surrounding areas, with ticket prices very low, at around €1.00, making day trips amongst locals attractive and commonplace. During the winter ski season, a regular express bus service, known as 100% Neige, connects the resort with Nice Côte d'Azur Airport via the Grand Arénas interchange.

The 1993 Tour de France and 2024 Tour de France used Isola 2000 as a stage finish, and the 2008 Tour de France also passed through the resort.

On 23 March 2008, Isola hosted various slalom stages for the Championnats de France de Ski 2008 (the 2008 French ski championships).

== Ski facilities ==
=== Lifts ===
Isola 2000 currently has 2 gondola lifts, 9 chairlifts, 10 button lifts and 1 funicular, with a total capacity of about 20,000 pph.

=== Piste ===
The resort has over 120 km of piste, consisting of two main ski areas. There are 7 green runs, 21 blue runs, 11 red runs, and 4 black runs. The resort is considered by ski guides to be well suited for families, beginner and intermediate level skiers.

At 2000m, the resort is one of the highest in the Alps. This, with a favourable micro-climate, ensures fairly reliable snow cover, and in December 2007, Isola 2000 was the resort with the most snow cover in France. However, when required, there are over 210 snow cannons to guarantee skiable conditions.

The resort also has a snow park, including jumps and rails, 3 km of cross-country ski piste and downhill racing facilities.

== The resort ==
=== Architecture ===
The buildings in the resort are mainly clustered around the original purpose-built structure from the early seventies. This complex incorporates much concrete in its design, and is considered by most visitors as an ugly building. However, there have been many smaller structures built around it, which are more akin to traditional wooden chalet style. As the resort is very high compared to other resorts, there are very few trees at the station altitude and above.

=== Dining and nightlife ===
The resort has a handful of bars and restaurants. It has been noted by some guides that the resort has limited night life.

== See also ==
- Auron, Isola 2000's neighbour ski resort, part of the Stations du Mercantour group
