= Isola, Alpes-Maritimes =

Commune in Provence-Alpes-Côte d'Azur, France

Isola
- Commune
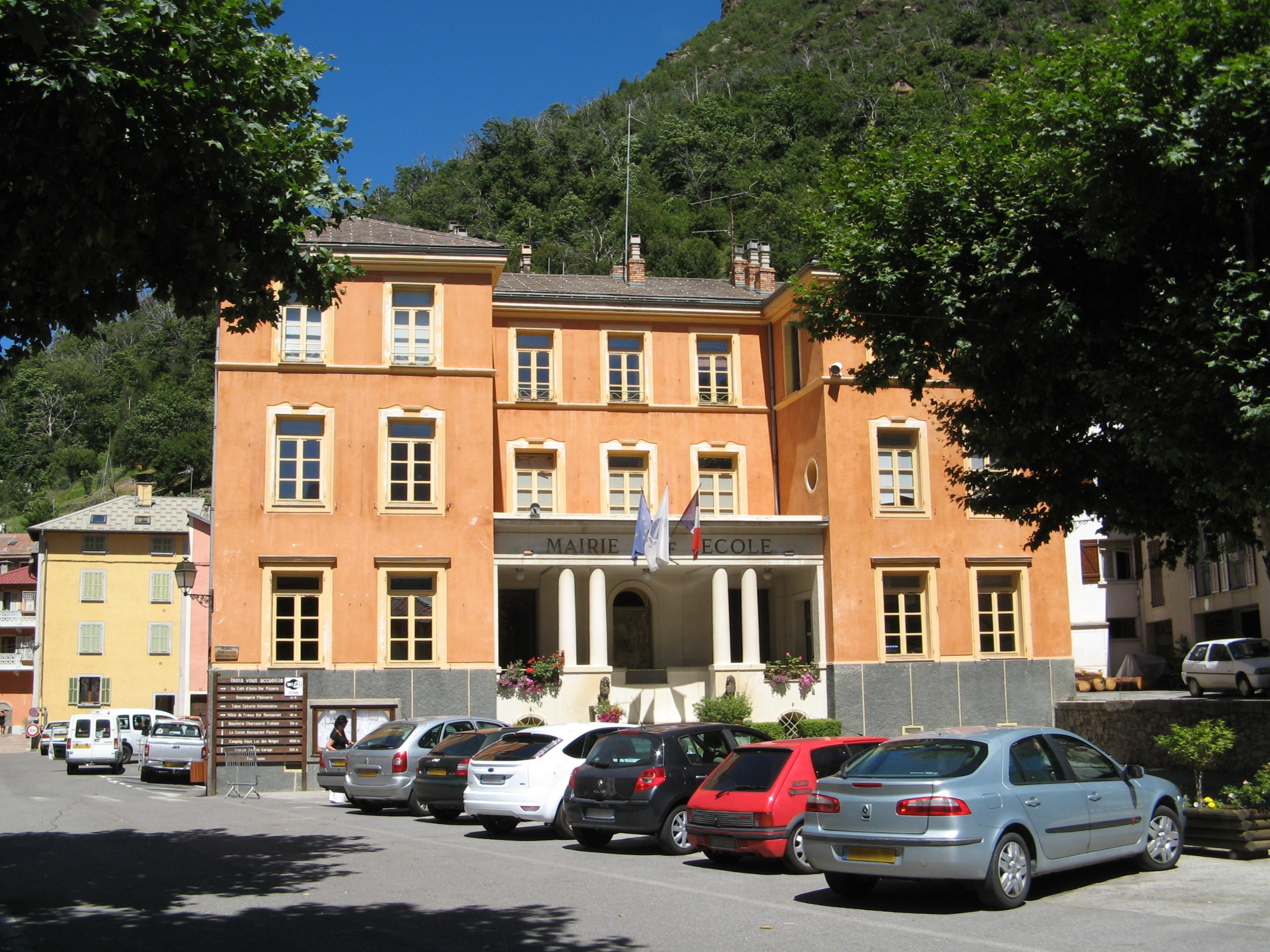
- The town hall of Isola

- Coat of arms
- Location of Isola
- Location within France Location within Provence-Alpes-Côte d'Azur
- Coordinates: 44°11′11″N 7°03′10″E
- Country: France
- Region: Provence-Alpes-Côte d'Azur
- Department: Alpes-Maritimes
- Arrondissement: Nice
- Canton: Tourrette-Levens
- Intercommunality: Métropole Nice Côte d'Azur

Government
  - Mayor (2026–32): Mylène Agnelli
- Area^{1}: 97.98 km^{2} (37.83 sq mi)
- Highest elevation: 2,930 m (9,610 ft)
- Lowest elevation: 719 m (2,359 ft)
- Population (2023): 642
  - Density: 6.55/km^{2} (17.0/sq mi)
- Time zone: UTC+01:00 (CET)
  - Summer (DST): UTC+02:00 (CEST)
- INSEE/Postal code: 06073 /06420
- ^{1} French Land Register data, which excludes lakes, ponds, glaciers > 1 km^{2} (0.386 sq mi or 247 acres) and river estuaries.

Isola (French pronunciation: [izɔla]; Occitan: Líusola) is a commune of the Alpes-Maritimes department in southeastern France.

The Alpine ski resort of Isola 2000 is located on the territory of the commune.

== Geography ==
=== Climate ===
Isola has a subarctic climate (Köppen climate classification Dfc). The average annual temperature in Isola is 3.8 °C (38.8 °F). The average annual rainfall is 1,250.4 mm (49.23 in) with November as the wettest month. The temperatures are highest on average in July, at around 13.0 °C (55.4 °F), and lowest in January, at around −4.0 °C (24.8 °F). The highest temperature ever recorded in Isola was 29.4 °C (84.9 °F) on 19 July 2023; the coldest temperature ever recorded was −24.0 °C (−11.2 °F) on 4 February 1978.

Climate data for Isola (1991−2020 normals, extremes 1972−present)
Month	Jan	Feb	Mar	Apr	May	Jun	Jul	Aug	Sep	Oct	Nov	Dec	Year
Record high °C (°F)	14.0 (57.2)	14.7 (58.5)	17.0 (62.6)	17.0 (62.6)	23.7 (74.7)	29.1 (84.4)	29.4 (84.9)	27.4 (81.3)	23.0 (73.4)	20.5 (68.9)	17.0 (62.6)	13.0 (55.4)	29.4 (84.9)
Mean daily maximum °C (°F)	0.4 (32.7)	1.7 (35.1)	4.6 (40.3)	6.4 (43.5)	11.0 (51.8)	15.5 (59.9)	18.6 (65.5)	18.6 (65.5)	13.5 (56.3)	9.2 (48.6)	3.6 (38.5)	0.5 (32.9)	8.6 (47.5)
Daily mean °C (°F)	−4.0 (24.8)	−3.6 (25.5)	−0.6 (30.9)	1.8 (35.2)	6.2 (43.2)	10.3 (50.5)	13.0 (55.4)	12.9 (55.2)	8.5 (47.3)	4.8 (40.6)	−0.1 (31.8)	−3.3 (26.1)	3.8 (38.8)
Mean daily minimum °C (°F)	−8.5 (16.7)	−8.8 (16.2)	−5.9 (21.4)	−2.8 (27.0)	1.4 (34.5)	5.1 (41.2)	7.3 (45.1)	7.2 (45.0)	3.5 (38.3)	0.4 (32.7)	−3.9 (25.0)	−7.1 (19.2)	−1.0 (30.2)
Record low °C (°F)	−20.0 (−4.0)	−24 (−11)	−22.0 (−7.6)	−15.0 (5.0)	−12.0 (10.4)	−5.0 (23.0)	0.0 (32.0)	−1.5 (29.3)	−5.0 (23.0)	−11.0 (12.2)	−19.0 (−2.2)	−21.5 (−6.7)	−24.0 (−11.2)
Average precipitation mm (inches)	85.0 (3.35)	65.0 (2.56)	80.4 (3.17)	121.6 (4.79)	99.8 (3.93)	89.9 (3.54)	76.2 (3.00)	63.4 (2.50)	114.9 (4.52)	172.5 (6.79)	182.1 (7.17)	99.6 (3.92)	1,250.4 (49.23)
Average precipitation days (≥ 1.0 mm)	7.5	7.6	8.0	11.8	12.5	11.1	8.9	7.9	8.6	9.4	9.7	7.9	111.1
Source: Météo-France

== Population ==
Historical population
Year	Pop.	±% p.a.
1968	223	—
1975	389	+8.27%
1982	539	+4.77%
1990	576	+0.83%
1999	526	−1.00%
2007	630	+2.28%
2012	747	+3.47%
2017	681	−1.83%
2023	642	−0.98%
Source: INSEE

== International relations ==
Since April 2010, Isola has been officially twinned with Castiglione di Garfagnana.

== See also ==
- Communes of the Alpes-Maritimes department
