= Kikka =

Kikka may refer to:

- Kikka, Estonia, a village in Estonia
- Kikka Hanazawa (born 1970), Japanese investor and fashion industry executive
- Kikka Sirén (1964–2005), Finnish singer
- Nakajima Kikka, a Japanese jet aircraft
- Kikka!, a 2022 film about the singer Kikka Sirén

== See also ==
- Kika (disambiguation)
- Kikas (disambiguation)
- Kikkas
