= Kikkas =

Family name

Kikkas or Kikas is an Estonian surname (meaning rooster), and may refer to:

- Irina Kikkas (born 1984), rhythmic gymnast
- Jaan Kikkas (1892–1944), weightlifter
- Kaupo Kikkas (born 1983), photographer
- Marie Heleen Lisette Kikkas (born 1996), footballer

== See also ==
- Kika
- Kikas
- Kikka
