= Kaupo (given name) =

Estonian male given name

- Gender: Male
- Language: Estonian

Origin
- Region of origin: Estonia

Kaupo is an Estonian-language male given name.

People named Kaupo include:

- Kaupo Kikkas, Estonian photographer
- Kaupo Palmar (born 1975), Estonian handball player
