= Pierre Gasly =

French racing driver (born 1996)

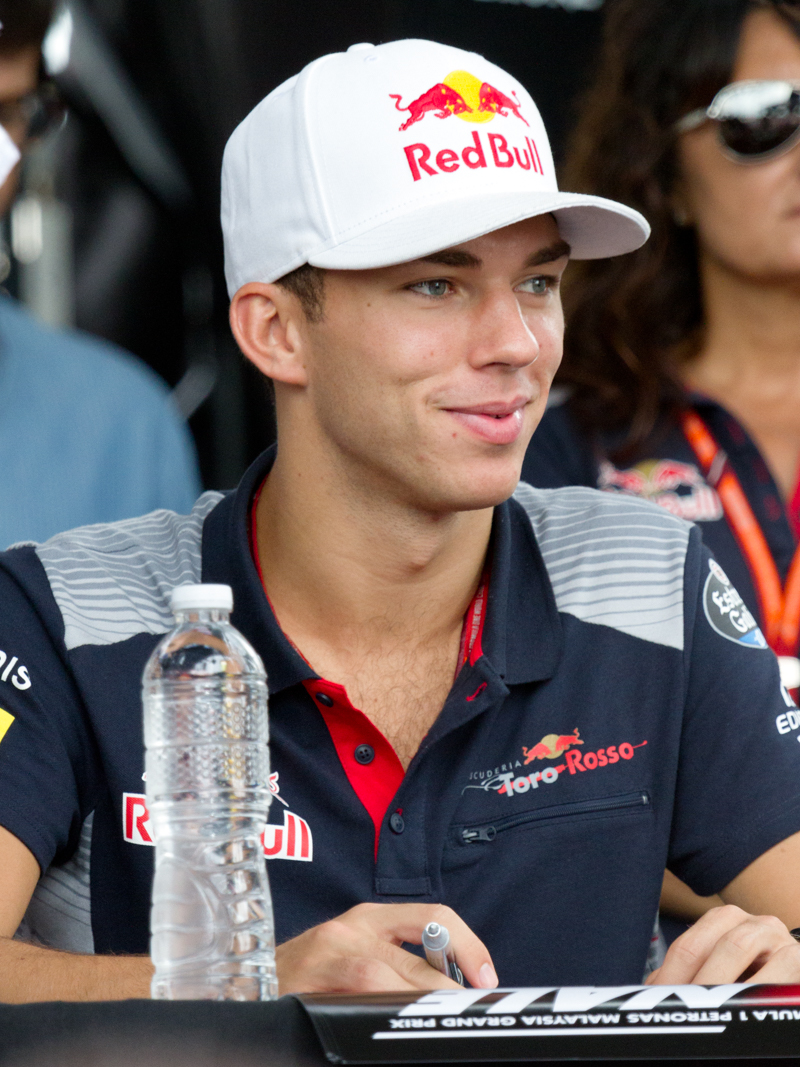
- Gasly at the 2017 Malaysian Grand Prix
- Born: Pierre Jean-Jacques Gasly; 7 February 1996 (age 30); Rouen, Seine-Maritime, France

Formula One World Championship career
- Nationality: (France) French
- 2026 team: Alpine-Mercedes
- Car number: 10
- Entries: 198 (197 starts)
- Championships: 0
- Wins: 1
- Podiums: 5
- Career points: 500
- Pole positions: 1
- Fastest laps: 3
- First entry: 2017 Malaysian Grand Prix
- First win: 2020 Italian Grand Prix
- Last entry: 2026 São Paulo Grand Prix
- 2025 position: 18th (22 pts)

Previous series
- 2017; 2017; 2014–2016; 2014; 2013; 2012–2013; 2012; 2011: Super Formula; Formula E; GP2 Series; Formula Renault 3.5; Formula Renault 2.0 Alps; Formula Renault Eurocup; Formula Renault NEC; French F4

Championship titles
- 2016; 2013: GP2 Series; Formula Renault Eurocup
- Website: www.pierregasly.com

Pierre Jean-Jacques Gasly (French pronunciation: [pjɛʁ ɡasli]; born 7 February 1996) is a French racing driver who competes in Formula One for Alpine. Gasly won the 2020 Italian Grand Prix with AlphaTauri.

Born and raised in Normandy, Gasly began competitive kart racing aged 10. Graduating to junior formulae in 2011, Gasly finished third in the French F4 Championship that year with the FFSA Academy. He won his first championship at the Formula Renault Eurocup in 2013 with Tech 1. Gasly then progressed to the GP2 Series, winning the championship in 2016 with Prema amid a close title battle with Antonio Giovinazzi. He moved to Super Formula the following year, finishing runner-up to Hiroaki Ishiura with Mugen, and debuted in Formula E at the New York City ePrix for Renault e.dams.

A member of the Red Bull Junior Team since 2014, Gasly made his Formula One debut with Toro Rosso at the 2017 Malaysian Grand Prix, replacing Daniil Kvyat for the remainder of the 2017 season. He completed a full-time move to Toro Rosso for 2018, before being promoted to parent team Red Bull in 2019. Gasly was demoted after the Hungarian Grand Prix, replaced by Alexander Albon; he achieved his maiden podium at the Brazilian Grand Prix that year with Toro Rosso. In 2020, Gasly took his maiden victory at the Italian Grand Prix whilst driving for the re-branded AlphaTauri. He achieved a third podium for the team at the Azerbaijan Grand Prix in 2021. Gasly moved to Alpine for his 2023 campaign, scoring his first podium for the team at the Dutch Grand Prix, repeating this feat at the rain-affected São Paulo Grand Prix in 2024. In the same place where he achieved his maiden victory, he achieved his maiden pole position at the Italian Grand Prix in 2026.

As of the 2026 São Paulo Grand Prix, Gasly has achieved one race win, one pole position, three fastest laps and five podiums in Formula One. Gasly is contracted to remain at Alpine until at least the end of the 2028 season.

== Early and personal life ==
Pierre Jean-Jacques Gasly was born on 7 February 1996 in Rouen, France, to father Jean-Jacques Gasly and mother Pascale. Gasly is the youngest of five and has four half brothers: two maternal from his mother's previous marriage, Nicolas Caron and Cyril Caron; and two paternal from his father's previous marriage, Phillipe Gasly and Paul Gasly. Gasly was raised Christian and routinely makes the sign of the cross to bless himself before races.

Gasly's family has long been involved in motorsports. His grandfather competed in karting, his grandmother a kart champion, and his father Jean Jacques has also competed in various categories of racing including karting, endurance racing and rallying. His father stopped rallying when he 'fell off [a] mountain' after his co-driver made a mistake reading the pace note. At the age of six, Gasly first experienced karting at a local karting track in Anneville-Ambourville. He was 13 years old when he left Rouen for Le Mans after his commitment for competitive racing.

Gasly grew up alongside Anthoine Hubert; karting with him since the age of seven, being educated at the same private school and having resided together as roommates for several years. He has been close friends with Charles Leclerc and Esteban Ocon since a young age. However, his relationship with Ocon deteriorated during their karting career. In 2019 he moved to Milan. Besides his native French, Gasly also speaks Italian and English.

Gasly has been dating Portuguese model Francisca Gomes since October 2022.

== Junior racing career ==
=== Karting ===
Gasly entered competitive karting in 2006 at the age of ten, when he finished fifteenth in the French Minime Championship, before he finished fourth the following year. In 2008, he stepped up to the French Cadet Championship, before moving to the international scene in 2009. He moved into the KF3 category, staying until the end of 2010, when he finished as runner-up in the CIK-FIA European Championship.

=== Formula Renault ===
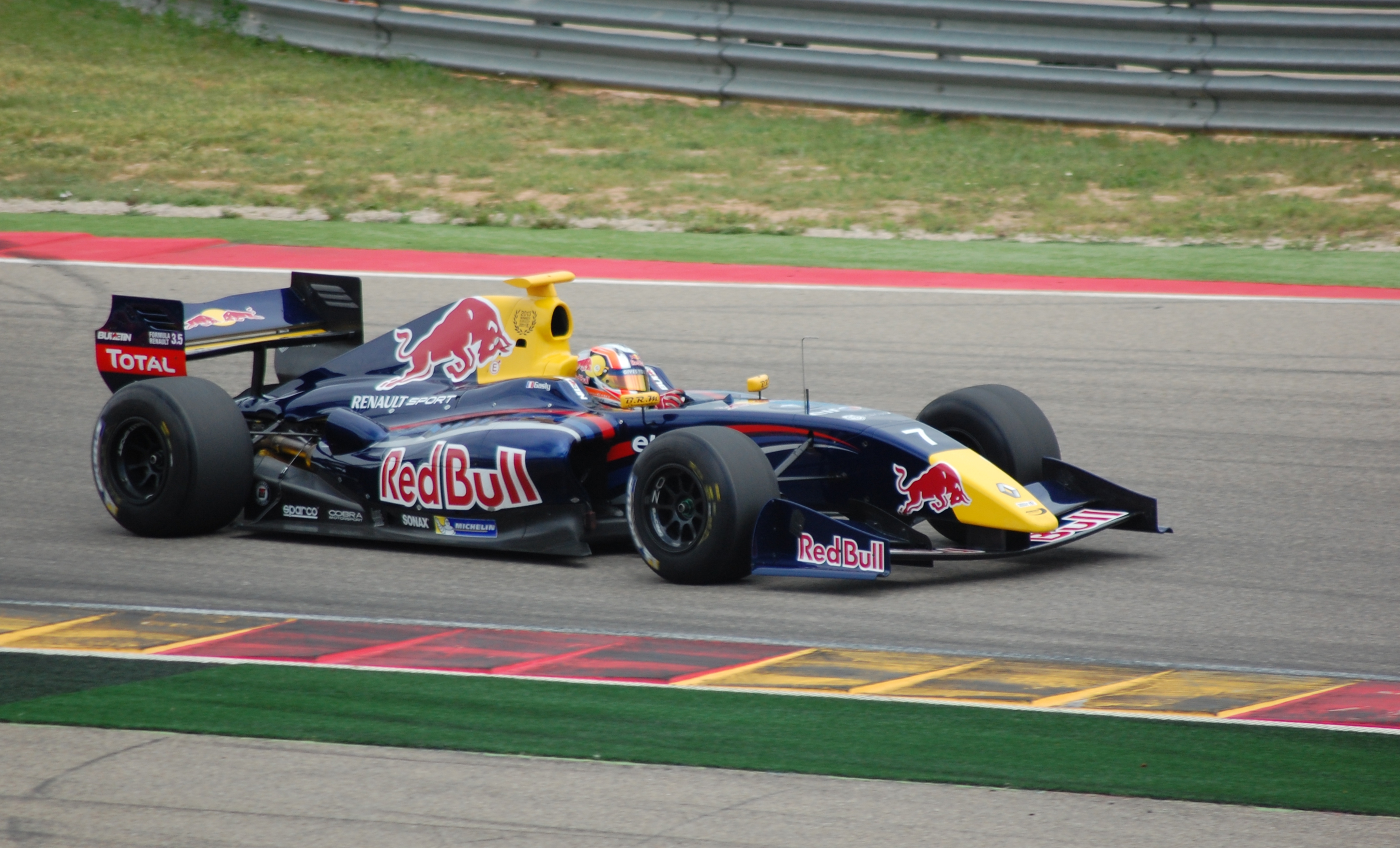
Pierre Gasly in Motorland Aragón, 2014

In 2011, Gasly made his début in single-seaters, taking part in the French F4 Championship 1.6-litre category. He finished third behind his future Eurocup rivals Matthieu Vaxivière and Andrea Pizzitola with seven podiums, including wins at Spa, Albi and Le Castellet.

Gasly moved to the 2-litre Formula Renault machinery in 2012, joining R-Ace GP in the Formula Renault Eurocup. He finished tenth with six point-scoring finishes, including podiums at Spa and the Nürburgring. He also had seven starts in the Formula Renault 2.0 Northern European Cup with the same team, taking a podium at the Nürburgring.

For 2013, Gasly moved to Tech 1 Racing. He took five podiums, as well as victories at Moscow, the Hungaroring and Le Castellet. He held an eleven-point lead over Oliver Rowland into the final meeting at Circuit de Barcelona-Catalunya, and ultimately clinched the title with third and sixth-place finishes; the latter result coming after a collision with Rowland, who received a drive-through penalty as a result.

Gasly jumped to Formula Renault 3.5 Series in 2014, where he was hired by Arden under the Red Bull Junior Team development program. He finished the season as runner-up to another Red Bull Junior Carlos Sainz Jr., collecting eight podiums in the seventeen races.

=== GP2 Series ===
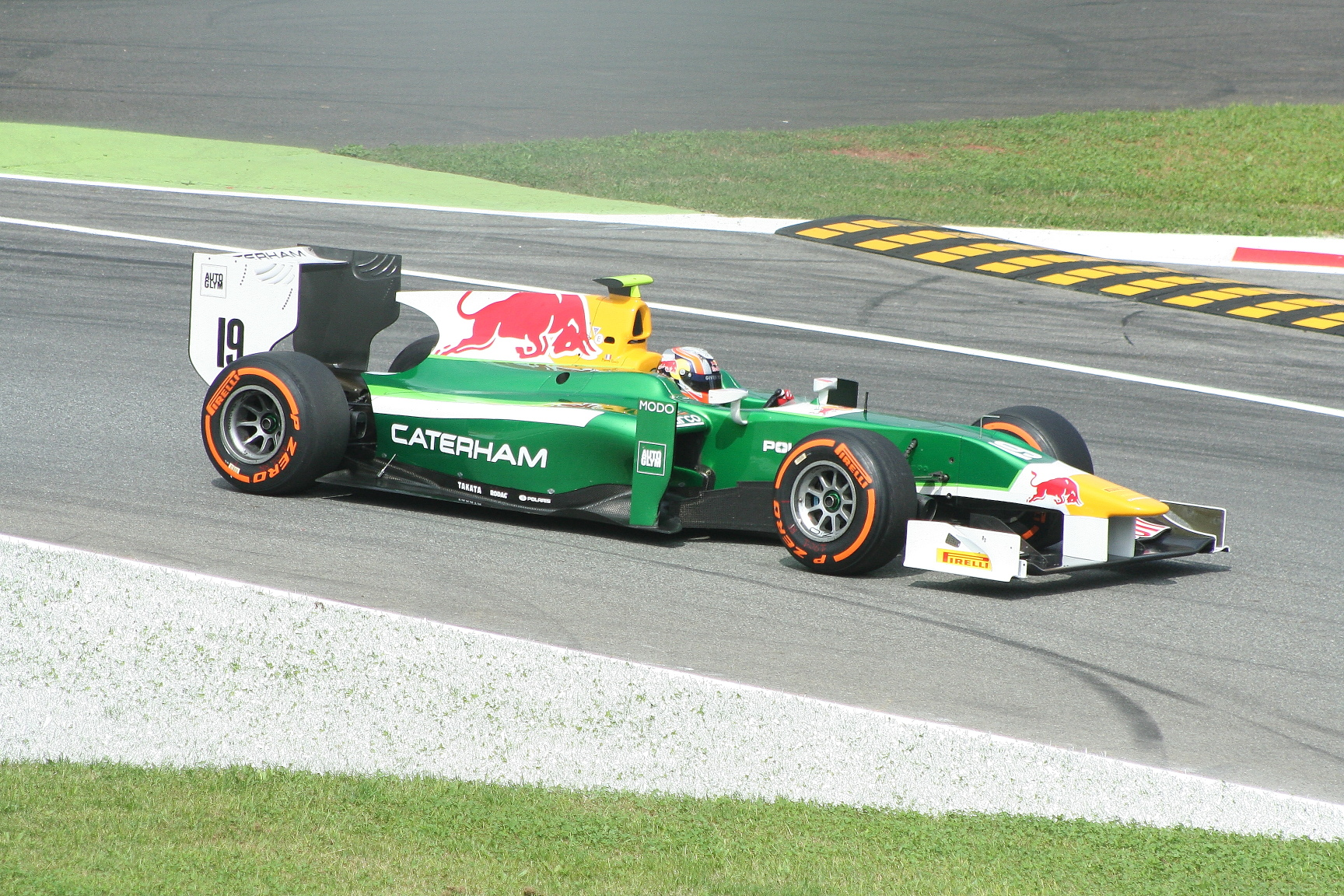
Gasly racing at the 2014 Monza GP2 Series round

Gasly made his GP2 Series debut in 2014 at Monza circuit in support of Italian Grand Prix, replacing Caterham Racing driver Tom Dillmann who had commitments at other racing series and was unable to participate in GP2 Series races for that weekend. He then partook in post-season testing, driving for DAMS and signed with the French team to race alongside the British driver Alex Lynn, development driver of Williams F1 Team. Though taking three pole positions and four podiums, Gasly experienced an uneven season, including causing collisions in Bahrain, Spa and Yas Marina (which got the subsequent race cancelled), which saw him finish eighth, two places behind teammate Lynn.

Gasly switched to newcomers Prema Powerteam alongside 2015 European Formula 3 runner-up and GP2 rookie Antonio Giovinazzi for 2016. Pressured by Red Bull Junior Team boss Helmut Marko to win the title or be dropped from the programme — with Red Bull reducing their financial contribution to $500,000, half the total needed to pay for a GP2 seat at an established frontrunning team — Gasly went on to become the GP2 Series champion that season.

== Formula One career ==
In December 2013, it was announced that Gasly would be inducted into the Red Bull Junior Team for the 2014 Formula One season alongside future GP2 Series teammate Alex Lynn and future Scuderia Toro Rosso teammate Carlos Sainz Jr. Gasly's first experience in Formula One machinery came in May 2015 at the in-season test at the Circuit de Barcelona-Catalunya. He drove the Toro Rosso STR10 on the first day of the test and the Red Bull RB11 on the second day, recording 203 laps in total. He later tested the RB11 again at the Red Bull Ring in June and was officially named Red Bull Racing's reserve driver in September. Gasly continued testing for Red Bull and Toro Rosso during the 2016 and 2017 seasons.

=== Toro Rosso (2017–2018) ===
==== 2017 ====
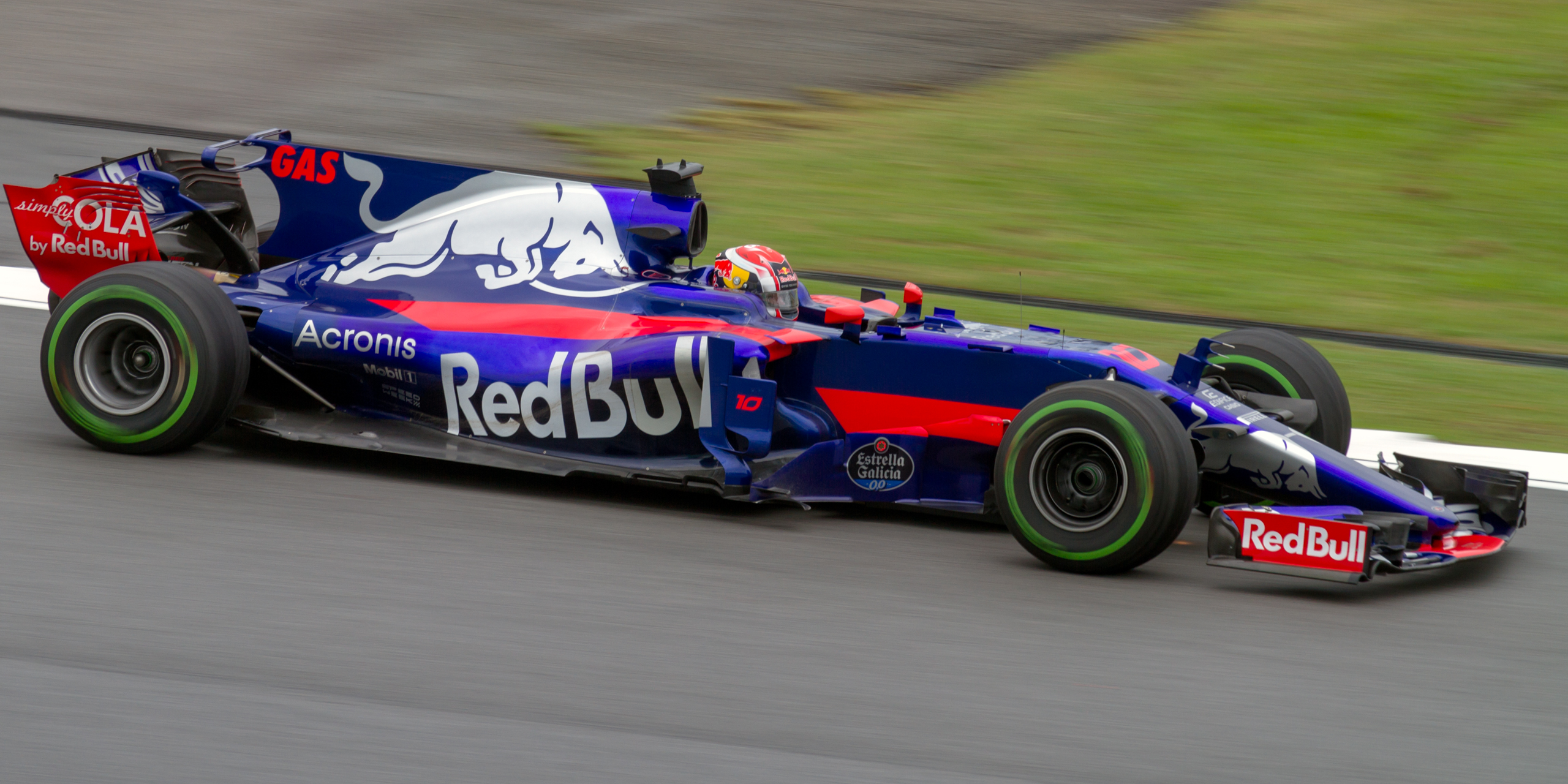
Gasly on his debut for Toro Rosso at the 2017 Malaysian Grand Prix

Gasly made his Formula One race debut at the 2017 Malaysian Grand Prix with Toro Rosso, replacing Daniil Kvyat. He finished the Malaysian and Japanese Grands Prix outside the points. Gasly was expected to take Carlos Sainz Jr.'s seat at the United States Grand Prix after Sainz left for Renault, but he was forced to miss the race due to a clash with the final round of the 2017 Super Formula Championship. He returned to the team for the Mexican Grand Prix, partnering with Brendon Hartley after the team decided to drop Kvyat from the Red Bull programme.

==== 2018 ====
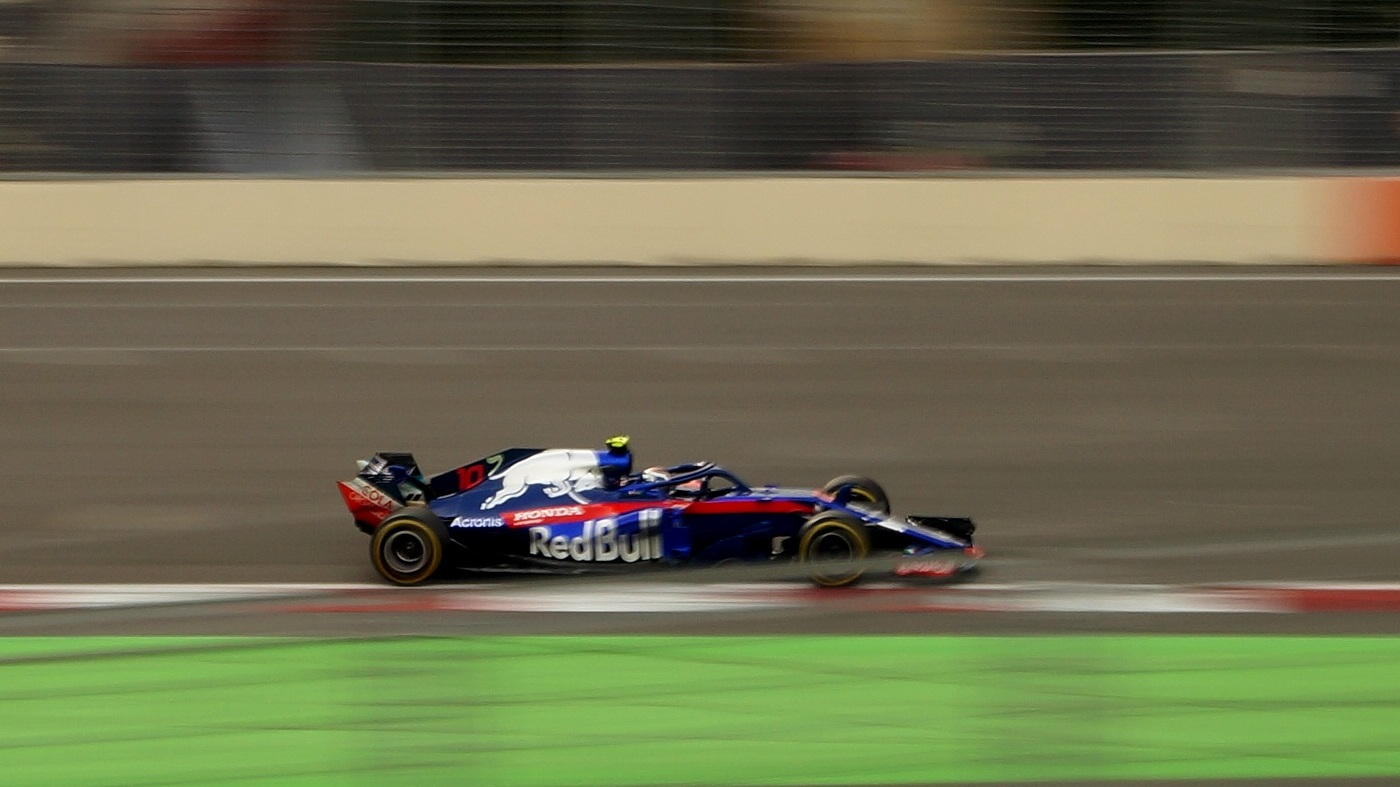
Gasly at the 2018 Azerbaijan Grand Prix

Gasly and Hartley became full-time Toro Rosso drivers for the 2018 season. At the Bahrain Grand Prix, Gasly qualified sixth but was promoted to fifth on the grid after a penalty for Lewis Hamilton. He finished the race in fourth place after Kimi Räikkönen retired, earning his first points finish in Formula One. A week later in China, he crashed into teammate Hartley in what the two confessed as being a 'miscommunication'. Gasly recorded four more points finishes during the season, including seventh place at Monaco and sixth place at Hungary. He ended the season in fifteenth place in the championship with 29 points, comfortably ahead of Hartley's total of four points.

=== Red Bull (2019) ===
==== 2019 ====
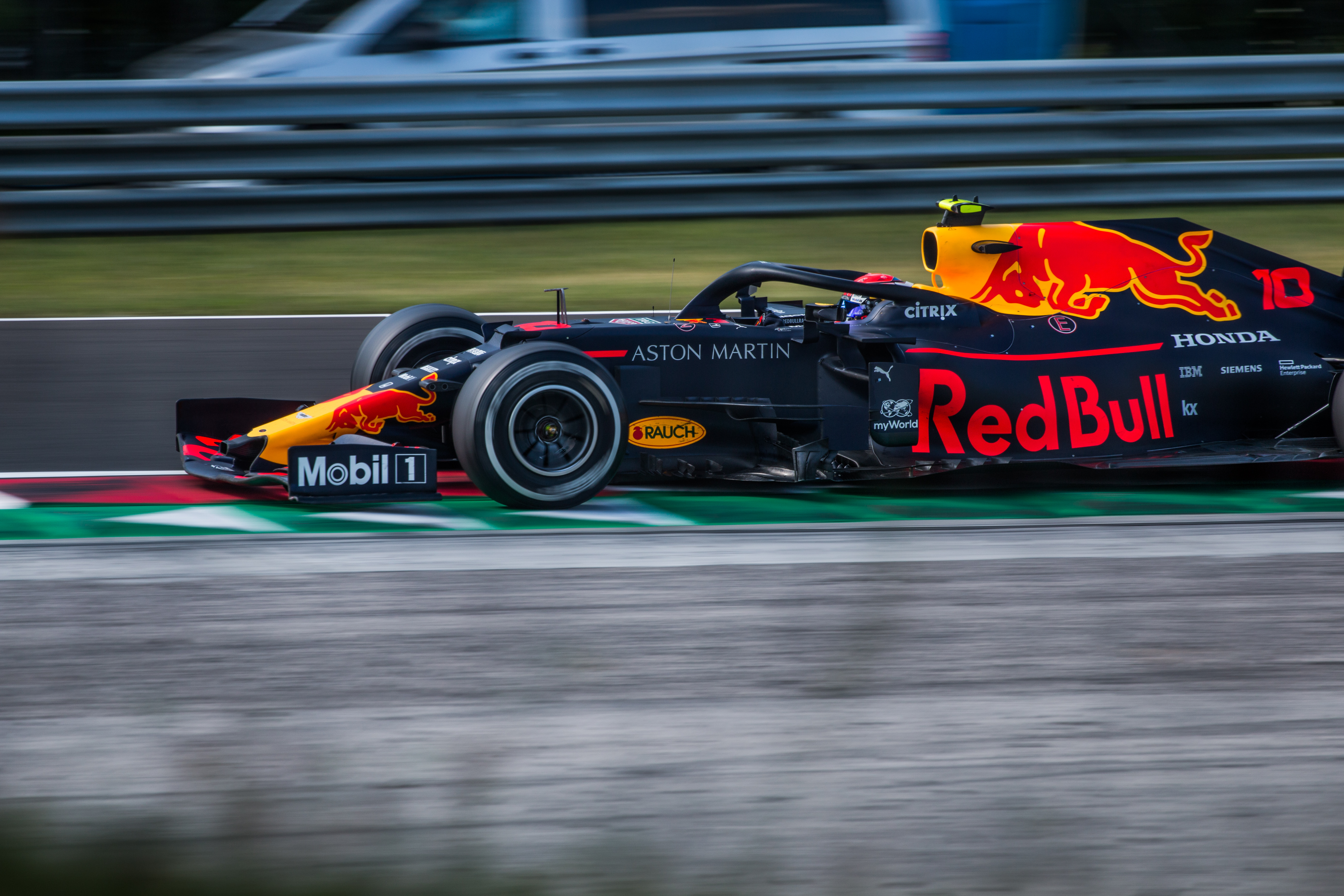
Gasly at the 2019 Hungarian Grand Prix

Gasly was contracted to drive for Red Bull Racing for the 2019 season, partnering Max Verstappen following the departure of Daniel Ricciardo to Renault. Gasly qualified seventeenth at his first race with the team, the Australian Grand Prix and failed to score in the race. He again failed to qualify in the top ten at the following Bahrain Grand Prix, and retired from sixth place with a driveshaft issue at the Azerbaijan Grand Prix. He scored points at the following six races but finished a lap behind the leaders at the Canadian, French and Austrian Grands Prix, the latter of which was won by Verstappen. His best result with Red Bull Racing came at the British Grand Prix where he finished fourth after Verstappen and Sebastian Vettel collided ahead. At the German Grand Prix, Gasly retired after colliding with Alex Albon's Toro Rosso in an attempt to overtake for sixth place.

Gasly came under increasing pressure at the Hungarian Grand Prix, where he finished sixth having been lapped by Verstappen. Despite Gasly's poor results, Red Bull team principal Christian Horner and advisor Helmut Marko stated that the team intended to keep Gasly until the end of the season. At this stage of the season, Gasly was sixth in the drivers' championship with 63 points. Verstappen, meanwhile, had recorded 181 points, two race wins, five podium finishes, and one pole position.

=== Return to Toro Rosso / AlphaTauri (2019–2022) ===
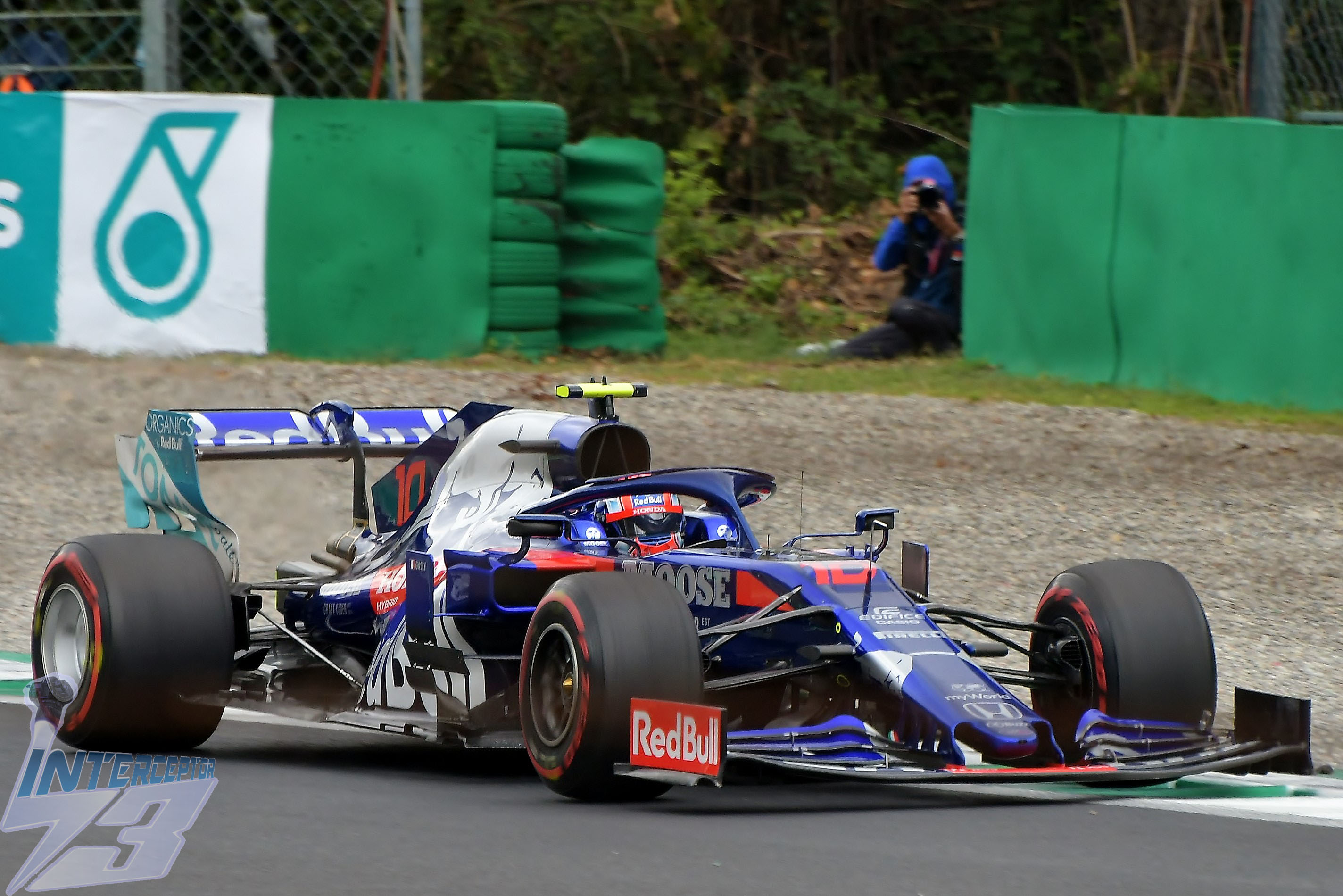
Gasly at the 2019 Italian Grand Prix, after being dropped to Scuderia Toro Rosso mid-season

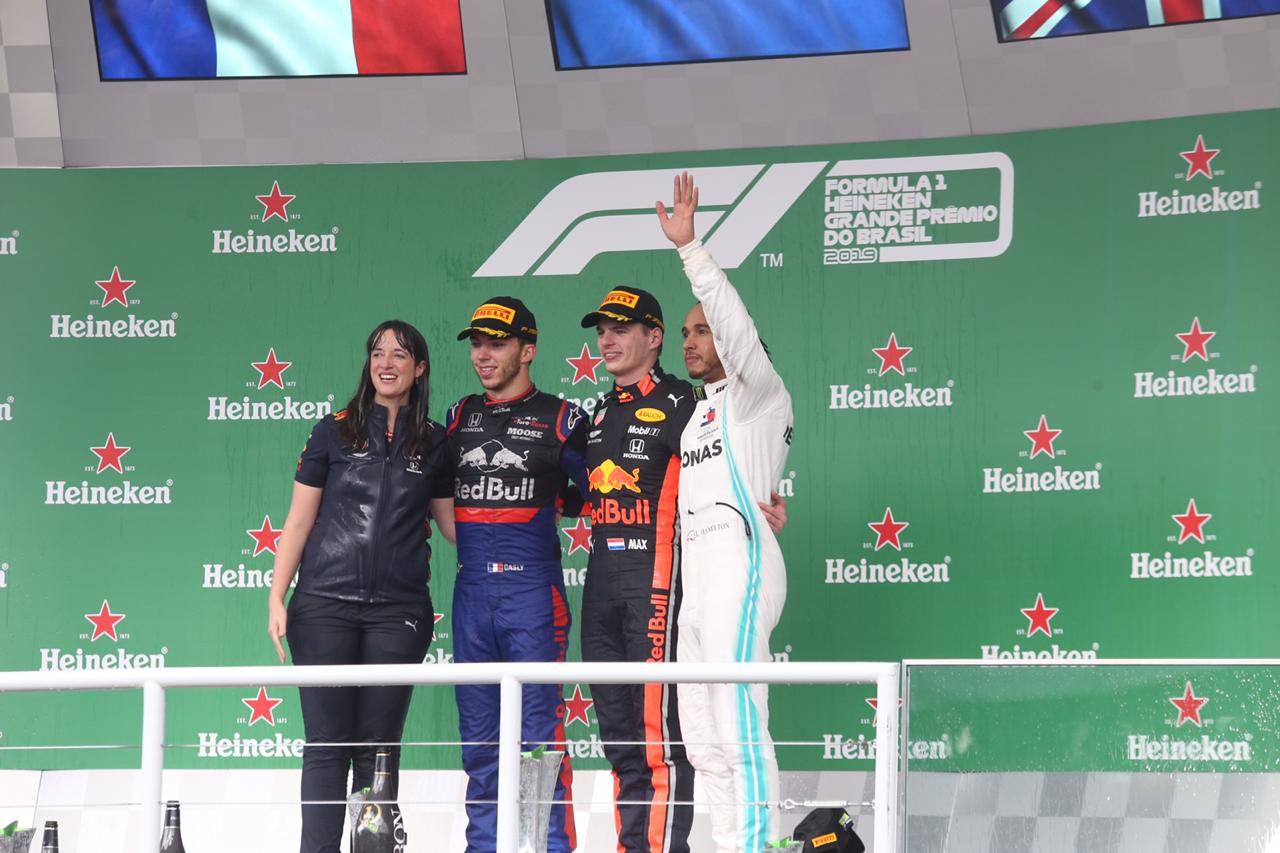
Gasly (second from left) on his maiden podium after finishing second in the 2019 Brazilian Grand Prix

Ahead of the Belgian Grand Prix, Gasly was demoted back to junior team Toro Rosso with Alex Albon taking his place at Red Bull. Red Bull stated that the swap was made in order to "make an informed decision as to who will drive alongside Max [Verstappen] in 2020", with Horner remarking that "we desperately need [Gasly] realising more of the potential of the car."

During the remainder of the season at Toro Rosso, partnering with Daniil Kvyat, Gasly achieved five points finishes, including ninth place at his first race back at the team at the Belgian Grand Prix. His best result came at the Brazilian Grand Prix, where he qualified in seventh place and took advantage of retirements from Valtteri Bottas and both Ferrari drivers, as well as a collision between Lewis Hamilton and Alex Albon, to finish the race in second place after holding off Hamilton in a straight drag to the finish line. This marked the first podium finish of Gasly's Formula One career, Toro Rosso's best race result since the 2008 Italian Grand Prix, and Honda's first 1–2 finish since the 1991 Japanese Grand Prix. On his cool-down lap, Gasly remarked over the radio: "This is the best day of my life". He ended the season seventh in the drivers' championship with 95 points; during his nine races back at Toro Rosso, he scored 32 points compared to 10 for teammate Kvyat in the same period.

==== 2020: Maiden win ====
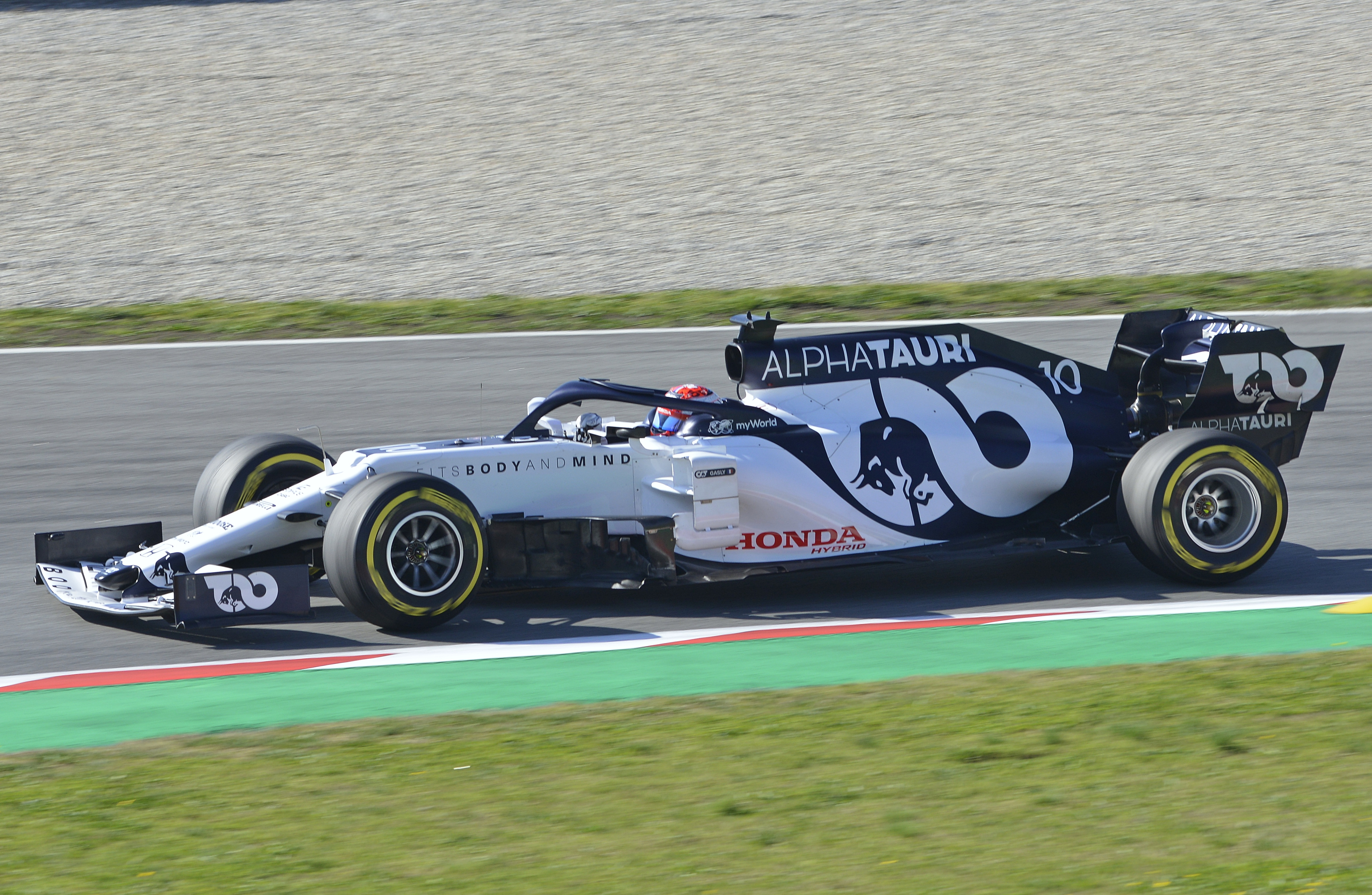
Gasly at pre-season testing in 2020

Gasly was retained by the team, along with Kvyat, as they rebranded to Scuderia AlphaTauri. Gasly achieved four points finishes in the first seven races of the season, with best results of seventh place at the Austrian and British Grands Prix.

At the Italian Grand Prix, an early pit stop allowed Gasly to pass several drivers - who had to wait for the pitlane to open during a safety car procedure - promoting him to third place. As race leader Hamilton entered the pits to serve a penalty and second-placed driver Lance Stroll lost places at the restart, Gasly inherited the lead of the race and held off the late-charging Carlos Sainz Jr. to take his first win in Formula One, becoming the 109th different race winner and the first French driver to win a Grand Prix since Olivier Panis' victory at the 1996 Monaco Grand Prix, 24 years prior. This prompted speculation that Gasly could return to Red Bull, as his replacement, Alex Albon, finished only fifteenth. Gasly remarked that he was 'ready' to do so. AlphaTauri team principal Franz Tost praised Gasly's race but dismissed the possibility of Gasly returning to Red Bull in the near future.

Gasly was eliminated in a first-lap collision at the following race, the Tuscan Grand Prix. He scored points at the next three races, including fifth place at the Portuguese Grand Prix, but retired with a coolant leak at the Emilia Romagna Grand Prix having qualified a season-best fourth. He finished the 2020 season tenth in the drivers' championship with 75 points, ahead of teammate Kvyat's 32 points.

==== 2021 ====
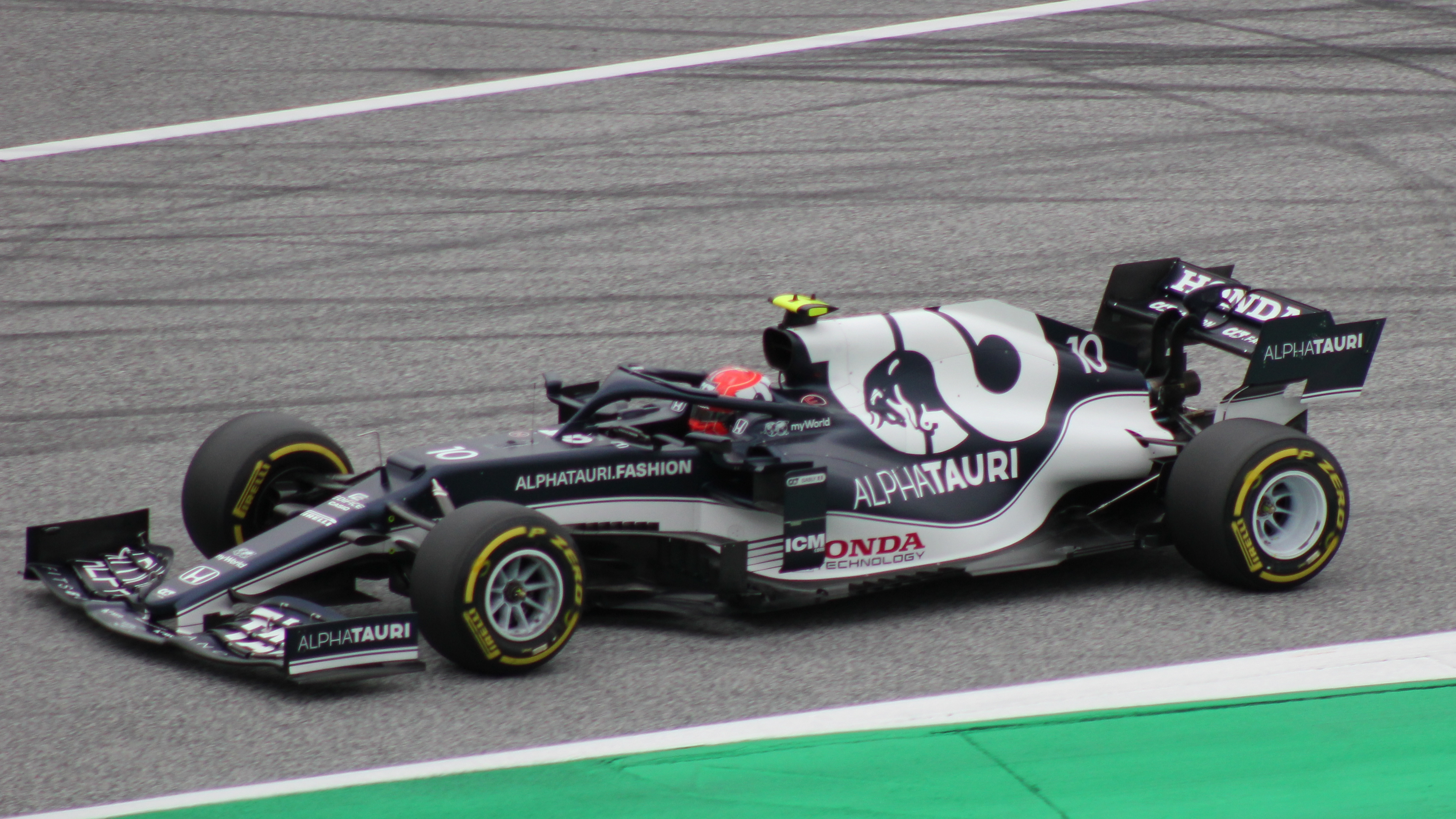
Gasly at the 2021 Austrian Grand Prix

Gasly was retained by AlphaTauri for 2021, partnered by Japanese rookie Yuki Tsunoda. He qualified fifth for the season-opening Bahrain Grand Prix but collided with Daniel Ricciardo and later retired from the race. He then scored points at the following six races, including his third career podium at the Azerbaijan Grand Prix. He qualified fourth, dropped to fifth early in the race, but benefited from a tyre failure for Max Verstappen and a mistake from Lewis Hamilton in the closing stages and prevailed in a battle with Charles Leclerc on the penultimate lap to finish third. Gasly's points streak ended at the Styrian Grand Prix when he was eliminated by a first-lap collision with Leclerc. A late-race puncture at the British Grand Prix dropped Gasly out of the points positions.

At the Italian Grand Prix, Gasly crashed out in sprint qualifying after he made contact with Daniel Ricciardo, wedging his front wing underneath his wheels. He retired from the race on lap four due to damaged suspension. He finished sixth at the Turkish Grand Prix despite a penalty for causing a collision with Fernando Alonso. Gasly started on the front row for the first time at the Qatar Grand Prix but finished the race outside the points. Gasly finished the season ninth in the drivers' standings with his highest ever points tally in a single season, scoring 110 points to teammate Tsunoda's 32.

==== 2022 ====
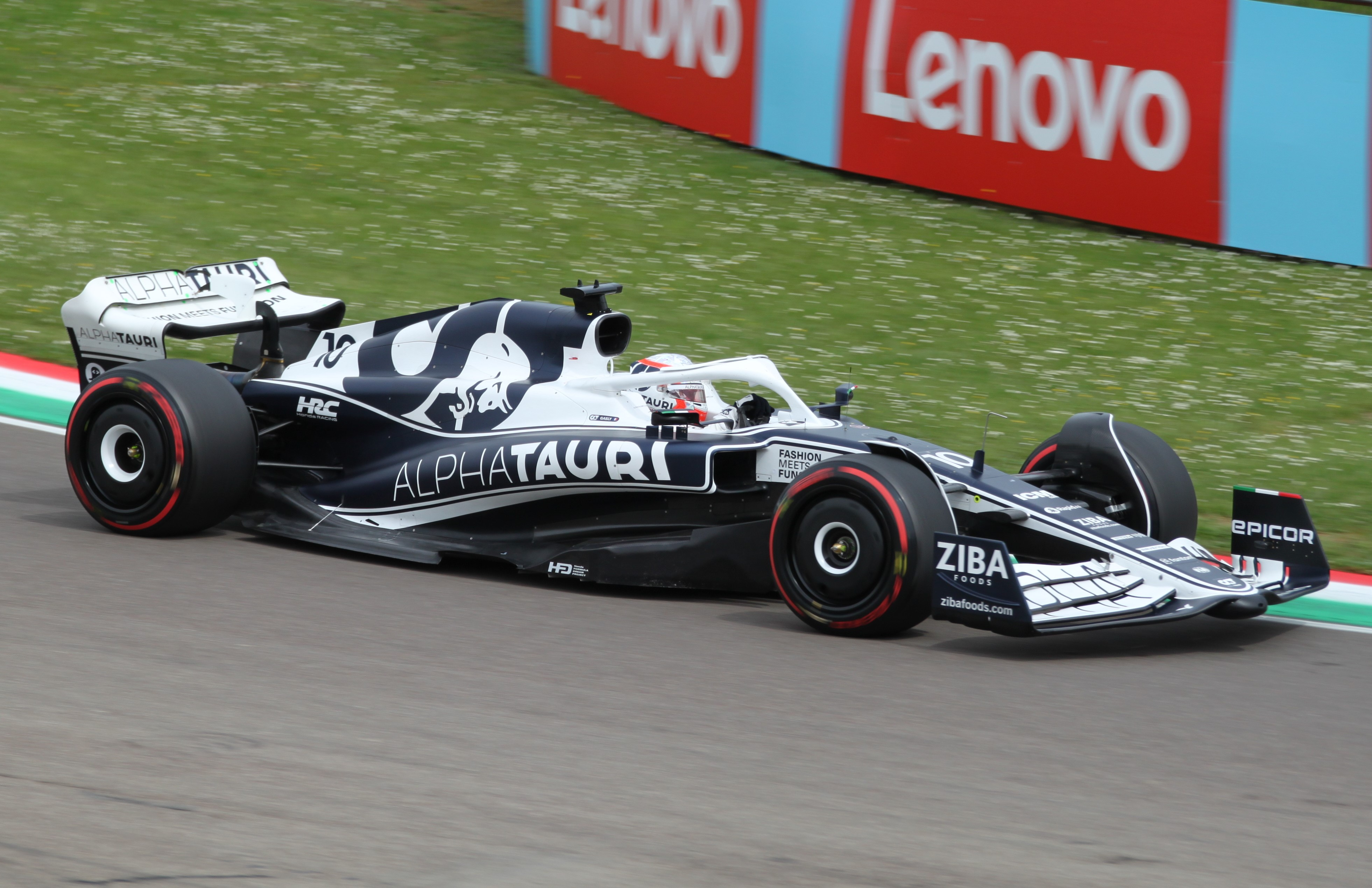
Gasly at the 2022 Emilia Romagna Grand Prix

Gasly continued to race for AlphaTauri in 2022 alongside Tsunoda. An engine fire caused his retirement from the season-opening Bahrain Grand Prix. He scored points at the Saudi Arabian and Australian Grands Prix, but failed to do so at the following four races, which included retirement from a collision with Lando Norris at the Miami Grand Prix. He ended the zero-point streak by finishing fifth at the Azerbaijan Grand Prix. Five more races without points followed, including a collision with teammate Tsunoda that ended his race at the British Grand Prix. Gasly qualified tenth at the Austrian Grand Prix but collided with Lewis Hamilton in the sprint and Sebastian Vettel in the race, finishing fifteenth.

Gasly was set to start the Belgian Grand Prix from eighth place, however an electrical issue shortly before the race forced him to start from the pit lane. He recovered to the points positions, finishing ninth. His final points of the season came at the Italian and Singapore Grands Prix. Gasly had run in seventh place in Singapore, but complained that the team "threw away" this result by switching him to dry-weather tyres too early, dropping him to tenth. At the Japanese Grand Prix, Gasly criticised the deployment of a recovery tractor in wet conditions to extract Carlos Sainz Jr.'s crashed car, describing it as "disrespectful" to the memory of the late Jules Bianchi and stating "I could have killed myself". He received a penalty for speeding under the subsequent red flag and was demoted to eighteenth place. Gasly ended the season fourteenth in the drivers' championship, scoring 23 points to Tsunoda's twelve.

After the Azerbaijan Grand Prix in June, AlphaTauri team principal Franz Tost confirmed that Gasly had a contract with the team and would remain with them for 2023. In August and September, information emerged that Alpine were targeting Gasly after Fernando Alonso and Oscar Piastri both left the team, and that Red Bull were willing to release him. Gasly's move to Alpine for 2023 was officially announced in October.

=== Alpine (2023–present) ===
==== 2023 ====
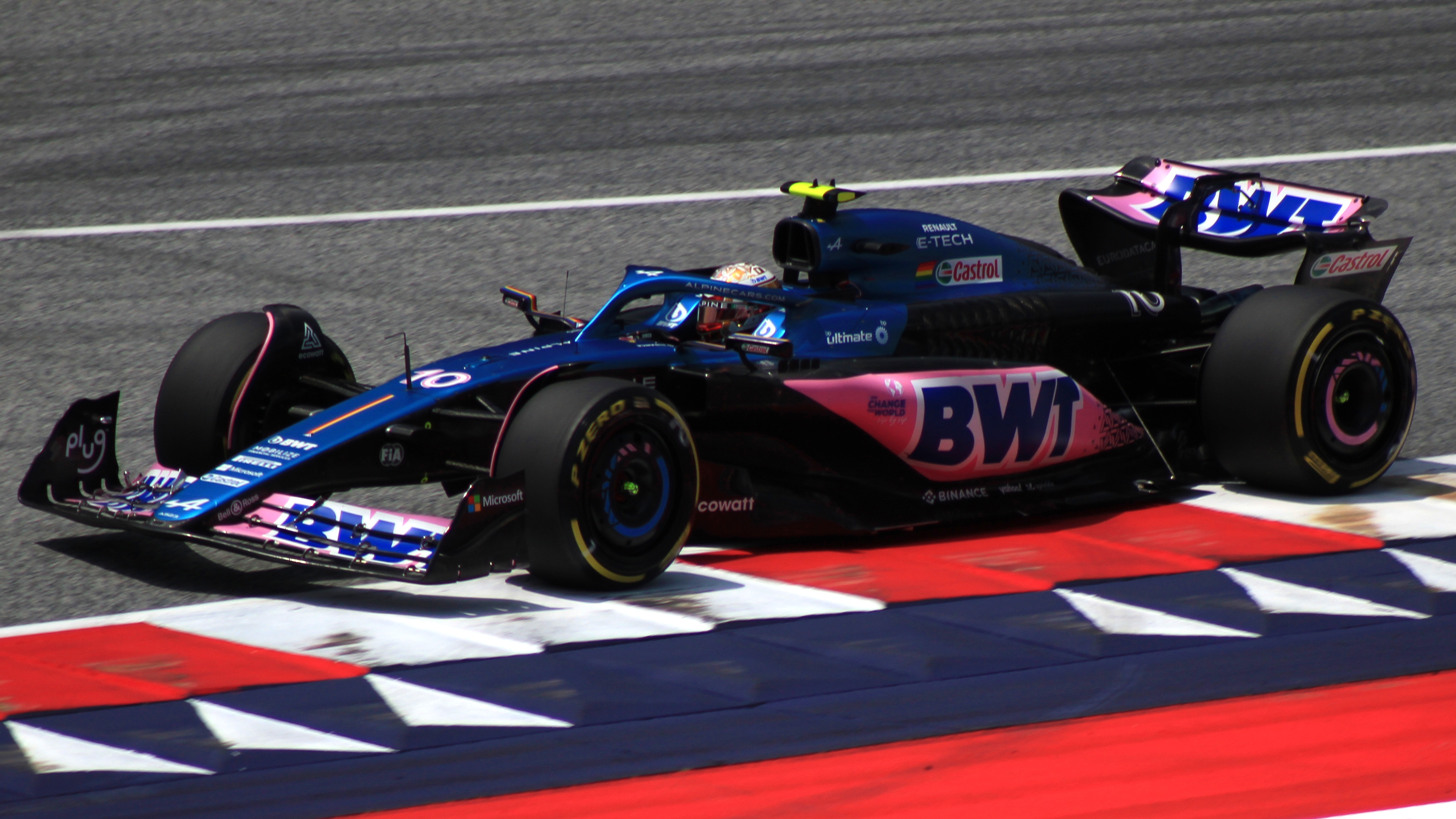
Gasly driving his Alpine A523 during the 2023 Austrian Grand Prix

Gasly signed a multi-year contract worth in excess of $10 million a year to race for Alpine in 2023, partnering fellow Frenchman and former karting rival Esteban Ocon. AlphaTauri allowed Gasly to join Alpine for the post-season testing immediately after the 2022 Abu Dhabi Grand Prix.

In his first race with Alpine at the Bahrain Grand Prix, Gasly started last after having his qualifying time deleted, but recovered to finish ninth in the race. Gasly was in fifth place when racing resumed after the second red flag at the Australian Grand Prix, but collided with Ocon at the first chicane, causing the retirement of both Alpine cars. His practice running at the Azerbaijan Grand Prix was curtailed by an engine fire. He later crashed in qualifying and failed to score points in the sprint or the main race. Gasly qualified in the top ten and scored points at the following three races; this included starting fifth on the grid at the Miami Grand Prix and qualifying fourth at the Spanish Grand Prix, before being demoted by two separate penalties for impeding.

Gasly next scored a point at the Austrian Grand Prix, where he finished ninth but was dropped one position for track limits infringements. Two retirements from collisions followed; one with Lance Stroll at the British Grand Prix and a multi-car accident on the opening lap of the Hungarian Grand Prix. He qualified sixth for the Belgian Grand Prix sprint and an early switch to intermediate tyres promoted him to third place, earning six points. He did not score in the main race, where he finished eleventh. His sprint podium was followed by a Grand Prix podium at the Dutch Grand Prix; he started twelfth and again benefited from an early stop for intermediate tyres. He crossed the finish line fourth but gained a place from Sergio Pérez's penalty, earning his first podium in over two years. Gasly achieved four more points finishes before the end of the season, including sixth-place finishes at the Singapore and United States Grands Prix. He started fourth at the Las Vegas Grand Prix but finished outside the points.

Gasly ended his first season with Alpine eleventh in the World Drivers' Championship with 62 points, one place and four points ahead of teammate Ocon.

==== 2024 ====
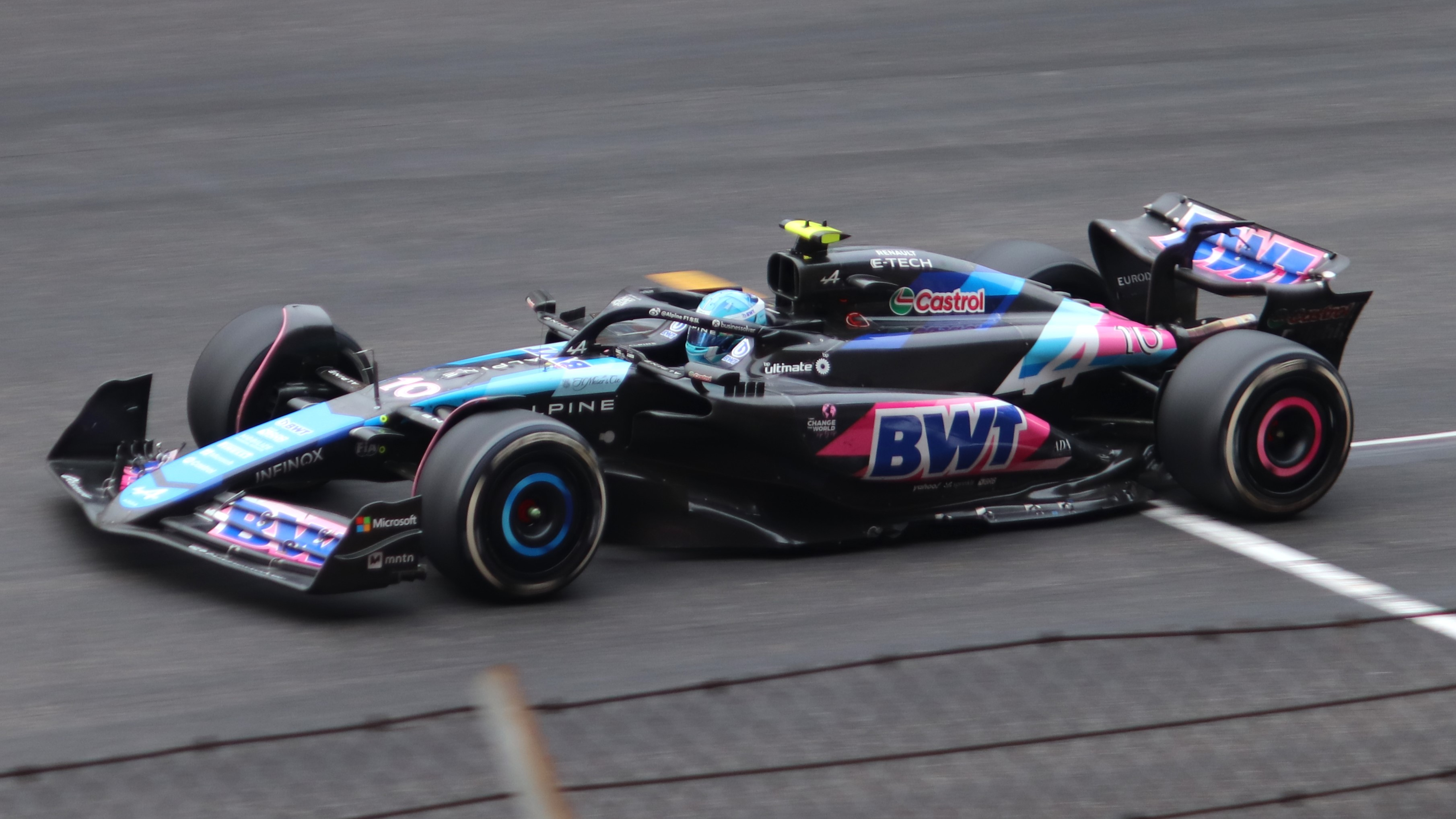
Gasly at the 2024 Chinese Grand Prix

Gasly and Ocon remained at Alpine for 2024. They qualified in the bottom two positions for the Bahrain Grand Prix. Ocon had commented after pre-season testing that the team were "on the back foot" and Gasly described the Bahrain result as "not a surprise". Both drivers were again eliminated in the first qualifying session (Q1) at the Saudi Arabian Grand Prix and Gasly was forced into retirement on the first lap of the race with gearbox issues. Gasly finished no higher than 12th position at the Australian, Japanese, Chinese, Miami, and Emilia Romagna Grands Prix, failing to score points in any of those races. Gasly's teammate, Esteban Ocon, ran upgrades to the Alpine car during the Chinese weekend but Gasly did not, receiving the same upgrades at the Miami Grand Prix. He scored his first point of the season at the Monaco Grand Prix, coming in tenth position, and two points at the Canadian Grand Prix, coming in ninth. Gasly then went on to qualify in seventh for the Spanish Grand Prix, before finishing ninth in the main race, whilst grabbing another point at the Austrian Grand Prix. Gasly retired in the next two races at the British Grand Prix and Hungarian Grand Prix. Gasly bounced back at the Dutch Grand Prix with a ninth place and two points, before enduring a four race pointless streak across the Italian, Azerbaijan, Singapore and United States Grands Prix, qualifying sixth at the latter. He ended this run by scoring one point at the Mexico City Grand Prix by finishing tenth. He had a high-scoring weekend at the São Paulo Grand Prix, finishing seventh in the sprint, and third in a rain-affected Grand Prix after starting thirteenth, marking Gasly's fifth career podium and his first since the 2023 Dutch Grand Prix—the result promoted him from seventeenth to twelfth in the standings. He then qualified a career-best third for the Las Vegas Grand Prix, but retired from the race with a mechanical issue in his third retirement of the season. Gasly ended the season on a high however, as he finished 5th in Qatar after holding off Carlos Sainz in the latter stages, and seventh in Abu Dhabi. This would help Alpine beat Haas to sixth in the Constructors' Championship and Gasly to finish tenth in the Drivers' Championship, as he scored 34 points in the final six races of the campaign.

==== 2025 ====
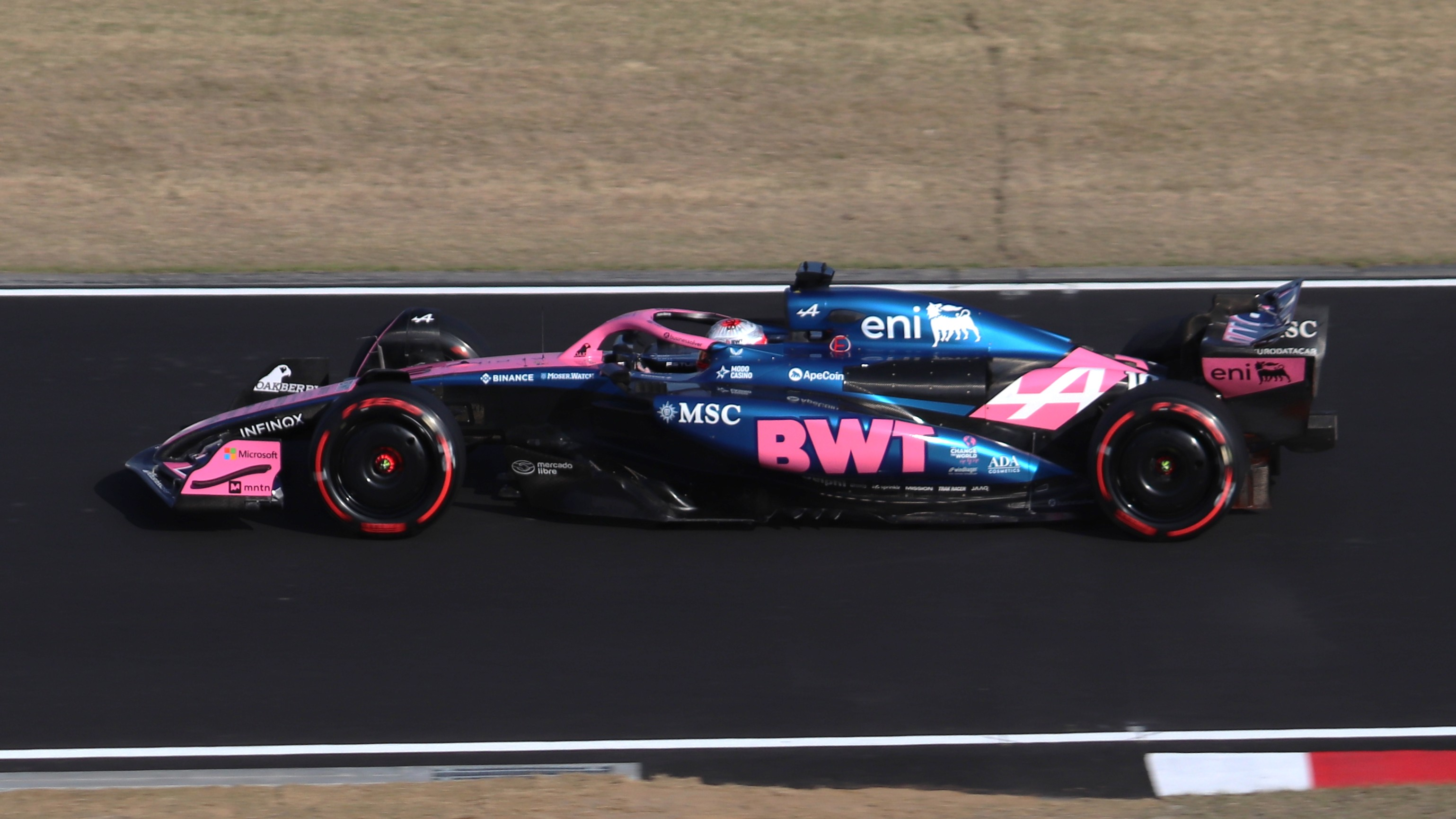
Gasly (pictured at the Japanese Grand Prix) began the season by partnering Jack Doohan in 2025.

In June 2024, Gasly extended his multi-year contract with Alpine until at least the end of 2026, later extending it to 2028. He would be partnering rookie Jack Doohan in place of the Haas-bound Ocon. Doohan was replaced by Franco Colapinto following the Miami Grand Prix. He was disqualified from the Chinese Grand Prix after his A525 was found to be underweight. Gasly scored all of Alpine's points for the season, scoring 22 points throughout the 24 rounds.

==== 2026 ====
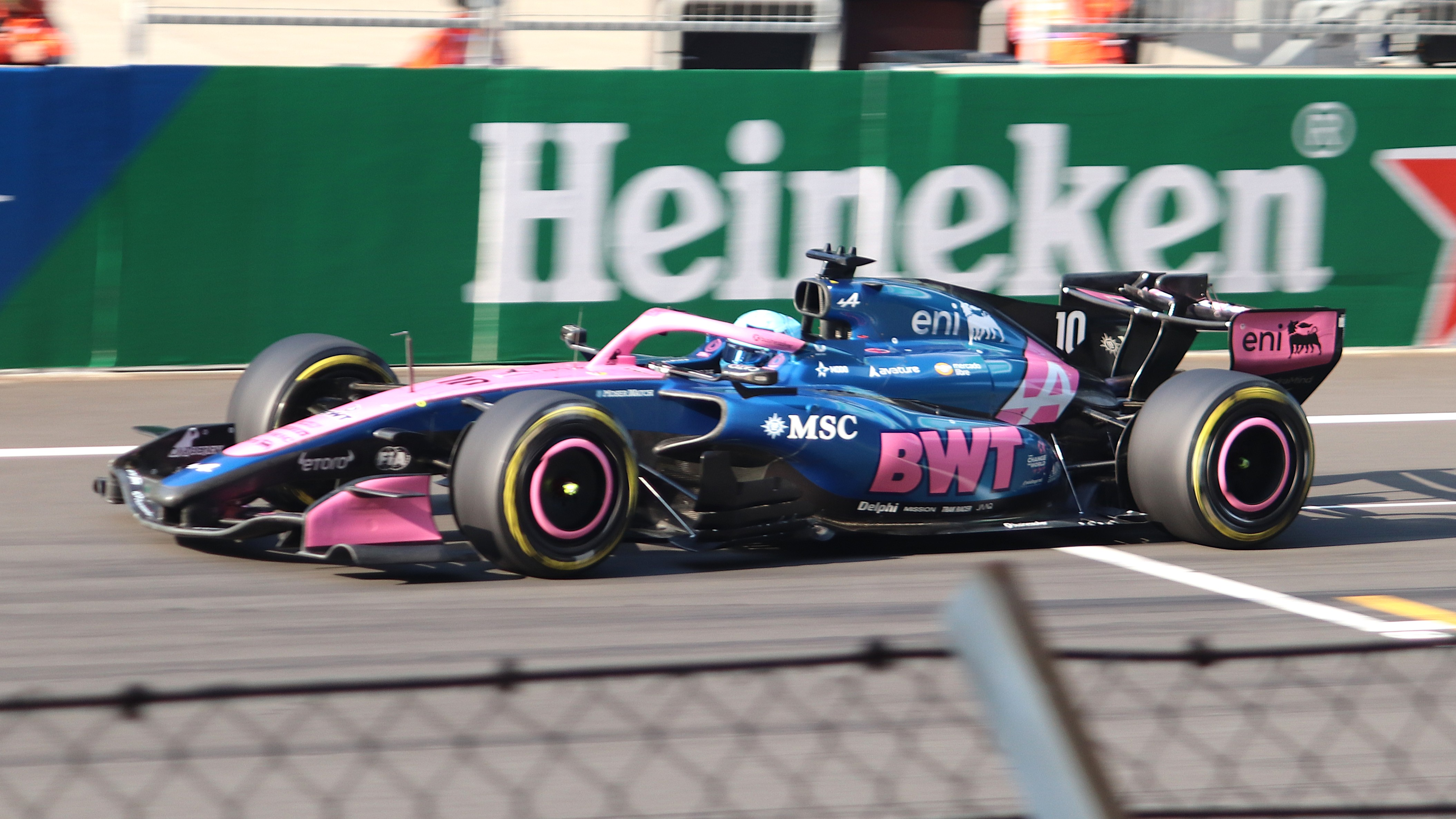
Gasly pictured at the 2026 Chinese Grand Prix driving the first Mercedes powered Alpine.

For the 2026 season, he partnered with Colapinto, the latter starting his first full season in Formula One as Alpine started to use Mercedes engines from the new season onwards. At the Australian Grand Prix, he finished 10th, keeping ex-teammate Ocon at bay who setttled for 11th. At the Monaco Grand Prix he finished in third place, though a pit lane speeding penalty demoted him to seventh. He was temporarily given a podium after Alpine presented evidence of a timekeeping error via a right to review. The podium was, however, ultimately rescinded by the FIA's International Court of Appeal. At the Italian Grand Prix, Gasly achieved his first-ever pole position, being the first Frenchman to do so since Jean Alesi at the 1997 Italian Grand Prix.

== Other racing ==
=== Super Formula ===
After his success in GP2, Gasly joined Team Mugen, partnering Naoki Yamamoto, to drive a Red Bull-sponsored Honda at the 2017 Super Formula Championship. He won two races in a row before his season was effectively cut short by the cancellation of the final round at Suzuka Circuit due to Typhoon Lan. Gasly finished second in the standings, half a point from clinching the championship.

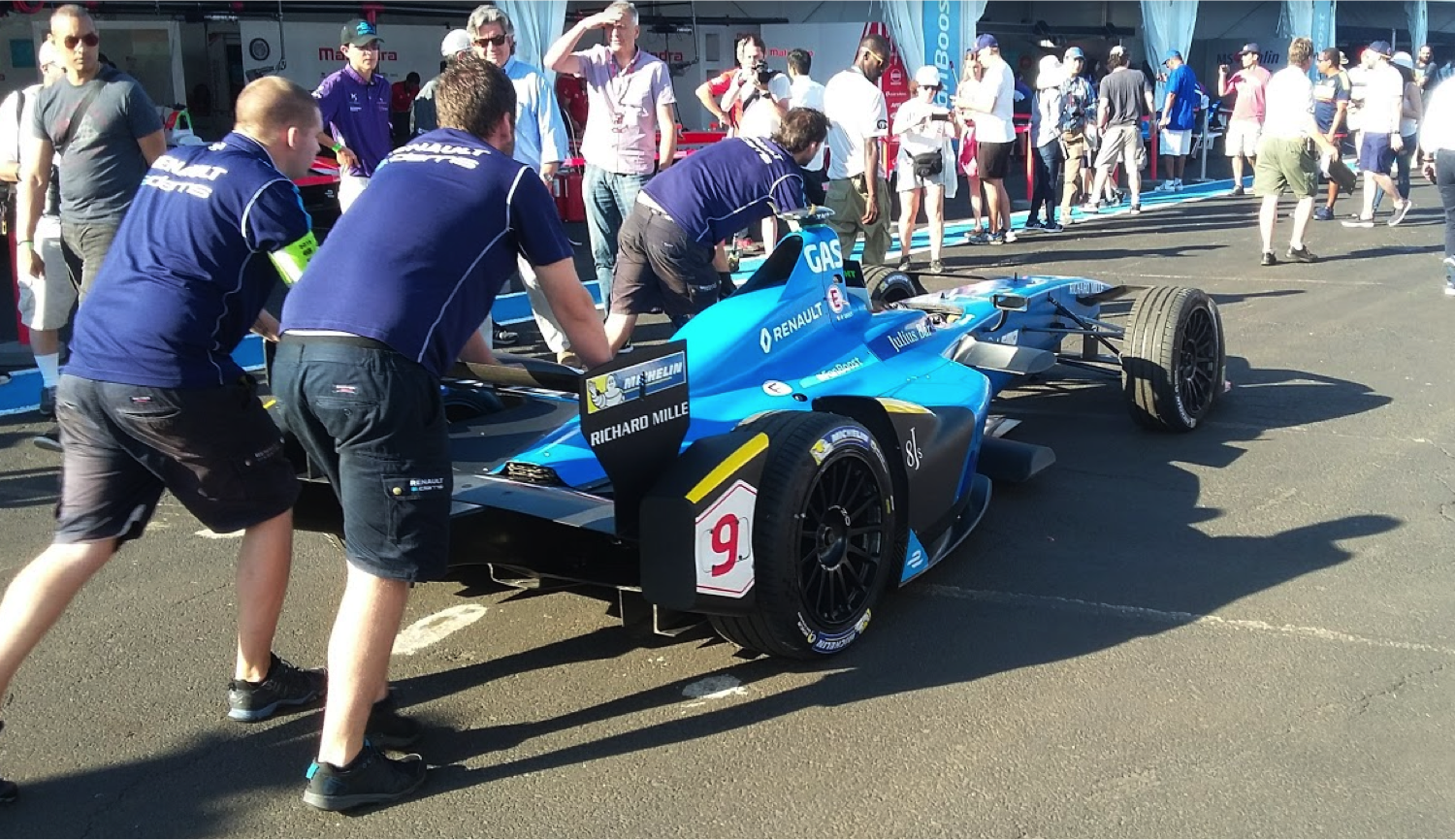
Gasly's Renault e.dams car in the NYC ePrix paddock prior to qualifying

=== Formula E ===
Gasly made a one-off Formula E appearance for Renault e.dams where he replaced Sébastien Buemi for the 2017 New York ePrix, due to the latter's commitments to the World Endurance Championship. In the weekend's first race, Gasly recovered from the poor qualifying performance of 19th to finish seventh in his debut race. Gasly nearly finished on the podium in the second race, hitting the wall on the exit of the final corner while battling for third and limping across the finish line with major damage in fourth.

== Karting record ==
=== Karting career summary ===
Season	Series	Team	Position
2005	Coupe de France — Minime		21st
2006	Championnat de France — Minime		15th
2007	Championnat de France — Minime		6th
2008	Bridgestone Cup — Cadet		NC
2008	Championnat de France — Cadet		4th
2009	South Garda Winter Cup — KF3	Sodikart	NC
2009	Championnat de France — KF3	Sodikart	3rd
2009	CIK-FIA European Championship — KF3	Sodikart	23rd
2009	CIK-FIA World Cup — KF3	Sodikart	3rd
2009	Monaco Kart Cup — KF3	Sodikart	16th
2009	Grand Prix Open Karting — KF3	Sodikart	3rd
2009	SKUSA SuperNationals — TaG Junior	Sodikart	3rd
2010	South Garda Winter Cup — KF3	Sodikart	10th
2010	WSK Euro Series — KF3	Sodikart	15th
2010	CIK-FIA European Championship — KF3	Sodikart	2nd
2010	CIK-FIA World Cup — KF3	Sodikart	4th
2010	Monaco Kart Cup — KF3	Sodikart	3rd
2010	Grand Prix Open Karting — KF3	Sodikart	1st

== Racing record ==
=== Racing career summary ===
Season	Series	Team	Races	Wins	Poles	F/Laps	Podiums	Points	Position
2011	French F4 Championship	Auto Sport Academy	14	4	2	1	7	104	**3rd**
2012	Eurocup Formula Renault 2.0	R-ace GP	14	0	1	0	2	49	10th
2012	Formula Renault 2.0 NEC	R-ace GP	7	0	0	0	1	78	23rd
2013	Eurocup Formula Renault 2.0	Tech 1 Racing	14	3	4	2	8	195	**1st**
2013	Formula Renault 2.0 Alps	Tech 1 Racing	6	0	0	0	3	72	6th
2013	Pau Formula Renault 2.0 Trophy	Tech 1 Racing	1	0	0	0	0	N/A	7th
2014	Formula Renault 3.5 Series	Arden Motorsport	17	0	1	3	8	192	**2nd**
2014	GP2 Series	Caterham Racing	6	0	0	0	0	0	29th
2015	GP2 Series	DAMS	21	0	3	1	4	110	8th
2015	Formula One	Red Bull Racing	Reserve driver						
2015	Formula One	Scuderia Toro Rosso	Test driver						
2016	GP2 Series	Prema Racing	22	4	5	4	9	219	**1st**
2016	Formula One	Red Bull Racing	Reserve driver						
2016	Formula One	Scuderia Toro Rosso	Test driver						
2016–17	Formula E	Renault e.dams	2	0	0	0	0	18	16th
2017	Formula One	Scuderia Toro Rosso	5	0	0	0	0	0	21st
2017	Super Formula	Team Mugen	7	2	0	0	3	33	**2nd**
2017	Formula One	Red Bull Racing	Reserve driver						
2018	Formula One	Red Bull Toro Rosso Honda	21	0	0	0	0	29	15th
2019	Formula One	Aston Martin Red Bull Racing	12	0	0	2	0	95	7th
2019	Formula One	Red Bull Toro Rosso Honda	9	0	0	0	1	95	7th
2020	Formula One	Scuderia AlphaTauri Honda	17	1	0	0	1	75	10th
2021	Formula One	Scuderia AlphaTauri Honda	22	0	0	1	1	110	9th
2022	Formula One	Scuderia AlphaTauri	22	0	0	0	0	23	14th
2023	Formula One	BWT Alpine F1 Team	22	0	0	0	1	62	11th
2024	Formula One	BWT Alpine F1 Team	24	0	0	0	1	42	10th
2025	Formula One	BWT Alpine F1 Team	24	0	0	0	0	22	18th
2026	Formula One	BWT Alpine F1 Team	20	0	1	0	0	42*	10th*

* Season still in progress.

=== Complete French F4 Championship results ===
(key) (Races in bold indicate pole position) (Races in italics indicate fastest lap)

Year	1	2	3	4	5	6	7	8	9	10	11	12	13	14	Pos	Points
2011	LÉD; 1 Ret	LÉD; 2 Ret	NOG; 1; 10	NOG; 2; 10	PAU; 1; 3	PAU; 2 Ret	VDV; 1; 6	VDV; 2; 9	SPA; 1; 2	SPA; 2; 1	ALB; 1; 3	ALB; 2; 1	**LEC**; **1**; 1	**LEC**; **2**; 1	3rd	104

=== Complete Formula Renault 2.0 NEC results ===
(key) (Races in bold indicate pole position) (Races in italics indicate fastest lap)

Year	Entrant	1	2	3	4	5	6	7	8	9	10	11	12	13	14	15	16	17	18	19	20	DC	Points
2012	R-ace GP	HOC; 1 Ret	HOC; 2; 13	HOC; 3; 17	NÜR; 1; 3	NÜR; 2; 6	OSC; 1	OSC; 2	OSC; 3	ASS; 1	ASS; 2	RBR; 1; 6	RBR; 2; 5	MST; 1	MST; 2	MST; 3	ZAN; 1	ZAN; 2	ZAN; 3	SPA; 1	SPA; 2	23rd	78

=== Complete Eurocup Formula Renault 2.0 results ===
(key) (Races in bold indicate pole position) (Races in italics indicate fastest lap)

Year	Team	1	2	3	4	5	6	7	8	9	10	11	12	13	14	Pos	Points
2012	R-ace GP	ALC; 1 Ret	ALC; 2; 7	**SPA**; **1**; 3	SPA; 2; 25	NÜR; 1; 32	NÜR; 2; 3	MSC; 1; 14	MSC; 2; 8	HUN; 1; 11	HUN; 2; 11	LEC; 1 Ret	LEC; 2 Ret	CAT; 1; 10	CAT; 2; 6	10th	49
2013	Tech 1 Racing	ALC; 1; 3	ALC; 2; 9	SPA; 1; 2	SPA; 2; 2	**MSC**; **1**; 1	MSC; 2 Ret	RBR; 1; 7	RBR; 2; 2	**HUN**; **1**; 1	HUN; 2; 5	**LEC**; **1**; 1	LEC; 2; 5	CAT; 1; 3	**CAT**; **2**; 6	1st	195

=== Complete Formula Renault 2.0 Alps Series results ===
(key) (Races in bold indicate pole position; races in italics indicate fastest lap)

Year	Team	1	2	3	4	5	6	7	8	9	10	11	12	13	14	Pos	Points
2013	Tech 1 Racing	VLL; 1; 3	VLL; 2; 4	IMO1; 1; 2	IMO1; 2; 4	SPA; 1	SPA; 2	MNZ; 1	MNZ; 2	MIS; 1	MIS; 2	MUG; 1; 11	MUG; 2; 3	IMO2; 1	IMO2; 2	6th	72

=== Complete Formula Renault 3.5 Series results ===
(key) (Races in bold indicate pole position) (Races in italics indicate fastest lap)

Year	Team	1	2	3	4	5	6	7	8	9	10	11	12	13	14	15	16	17	Pos	Points
2014	Arden Motorsport	MNZ; 1; 3	MNZ; 2; 5	ALC; 1; 9	ALC; 2; 2	MON; 1; 7	SPA; 1; 2	SPA; 2; 4	MSC; 1; 18	MSC; 2; 2	NÜR; 1; 20	NÜR; 2; 8	HUN; 1; 2	HUN; 2; 3	LEC; 1; 2	**LEC**; **2**; 2	JER; 1; 6	JER; 2; 4	2nd	192

=== Complete GP2 Series results ===
(key) (Races in bold indicate pole position) (Races in italics indicate fastest lap)

Year	Entrant	1	2	3	4	5	6	7	8	9	10	11	12	13	14	15	16	17	18	19	20	21	22	DC	Points
2014	Caterham Racing	BHR; FEA	BHR; SPR	CAT; FEA	CAT; SPR	MON; FEA	MON; SPR	RBR; FEA	RBR; SPR	SIL; FEA	SIL; SPR	HOC; FEA	HOC; SPR	HUN; FEA	HUN; SPR	SPA; FEA	SPA; SPR	MNZ; FEA; 17	MNZ; SPR; Ret	SOC; FEA; 11	SOC; SPR; 11	YMC; FEA; 21	YMC; SPR; 18	29th	0
2015	DAMS	BHR; FEA; Ret	BHR; SPR; 22	CAT; FEA; 7	CAT; SPR; 3	MON; FEA; 14	MON; SPR; 10	RBR; FEA; 13	RBR; SPR; 6	SIL; FEA; 4	SIL; SPR; 3	HUN; FEA; 2	HUN; SPR; 8	SPA; FEA; 19	SPA; SPR; Ret	**MNZ**; **FEA**; Ret	MNZ; SPR; 12	SOC; FEA; 2	SOC; SPR; 5	**BHR**; **FEA**; 6	BHR; SPR; 7	**YMC**; **FEA**; 5	YMC; SPR; C	8th	110
2016	Prema Racing	**CAT**; **FEA**; 3	CAT; SPR; 2	MON; FEA; 15	MON; SPR; 13	BAK; FEA; Ret	BAK; SPR; 2	RBR; FEA; Ret	RBR; SPR; 7	SIL; FEA; 1	SIL; SPR; 7	**HUN**; **FEA**; 1	HUN; SPR; 7	HOC; FEA; DSQ	HOC; SPR; 6	SPA; FEA; 1	SPA; SPR; 4	**MNZ**; **FEA**; 4	MNZ; SPR; 2	**SEP**; **FEA**; 11	SEP; SPR; 3	**YMC**; **FEA**; 1	YMC; SPR; 9	1st	219

=== Complete Formula E results ===
(key) (Races in bold indicate pole position; races in italics indicate fastest lap)

Year	Team	Chassis	Powertrain	1	2	3	4	5	6	7	8	9	10	11	12	Pos	Points
2016–17	Renault e.dams	Spark SRT01-e	Renault Z.E. 16	HKG	MRK	BUE	MEX	MCO	PAR	BER	BER	NYC; 7	NYC; 4	MTL	MTL	16th	18

=== Complete Super Formula results ===
(key) (Races in bold indicate pole position) (Races in italics indicate fastest lap)

Year	Entrant	Engine	1	2	3	4	5	6	7	8	9	DC	Points
2017	Team Mugen	Honda	SUZ; 10	OKA; 19	OKA; 7	FUJ; 5	MOT; 1	AUT; 1	SUG; 2	SUZ; C	SUZ; C	2nd	33

=== Complete Formula One results ===
(key) (Races in bold indicate pole position; races in italics indicates fastest lap)

Year	Entrant	Chassis	Engine	1	2	3	4	5	6	7	8	9	10	11	12	13	14	15	16	17	18	19	20	21	22	23	24	WDC	Points
2017	Scuderia Toro Rosso	Toro Rosso STR12	Toro Rosso 1.6 V6 t	AUS	CHN	BHR	RUS	ESP	MON	CAN	AZE	AUT	GBR	HUN	BEL	ITA	SIN	MAL; 14	JPN; 13	USA	MEX; 13	BRA; 12	ABU; 16					21st	0
2018	Red Bull Toro Rosso Honda	Scuderia Toro Rosso STR13	Honda RA618H 1.6 V6 t	AUS; Ret	BHR; 4	CHN; 18	AZE; 12	ESP; Ret	MON; 7	CAN; 11	FRA; Ret	AUT; 11	GBR; 13	GER; 14	HUN; 6	BEL; 9	ITA; 14	SIN; 13	RUS; Ret	JPN; 11	USA; 12	MEX; 10	BRA; 13	ABU; Ret				15th	29
2019	Aston Martin Red Bull Racing	Red Bull Racing RB15	Honda RA619H 1.6 V6 t	AUS; 11	BHR; 8	CHN; 6	AZE; Ret	ESP; 6	MON; 5	CAN; 8	FRA; 10	AUT; 7	GBR; 4	GER; 14^{†}	HUN; 6													7th	95
2019	Red Bull Toro Rosso Honda	Scuderia Toro Rosso STR14	Honda RA619H 1.6 V6 t													BEL; 9	ITA; 11	SIN; 8	RUS; 14	JPN; 7	MEX; 9	USA; 16^{†}	BRA; 2	ABU; 18				7th	95
2020	Scuderia AlphaTauri Honda	AlphaTauri AT01	Honda RA620H 1.6 V6 t	AUT; 7	STY; 15	HUN; Ret	GBR; 7	70A; 11	ESP; 9	BEL; 8	ITA; 1	TUS; Ret	RUS; 9	EIF; 6	POR; 5	EMI; Ret	TUR; 13	BHR; 6	SKH; 11	ABU; 8								10th	75
2021	Scuderia AlphaTauri Honda	AlphaTauri AT02	Honda RA621H 1.6 V6 t	BHR; 17†	EMI; 7	POR; 10	ESP; 10	MON; 6	AZE; 3	FRA; 7	STY; Ret	AUT; 9	GBR; 11	HUN; 5	BEL; 6‡	NED; 4	ITA; Ret	RUS; 13	TUR; 6	USA; Ret	MXC; 4	SAP; 7	QAT; 11	SAU; 6	ABU; 5			9th	110
2022	Scuderia AlphaTauri	AlphaTauri AT03	Red Bull RBPTH001 1.6 V6 t	BHR; Ret	SAU; 8	AUS; 9	EMI; 12	MIA; Ret	ESP; 13	MON; 11	AZE; 5	CAN; 14	GBR; Ret	AUT; 15	FRA; 12	HUN; 12	BEL; 9	NED; 11	ITA; 8	SIN; 10	JPN; 18	USA; 14	MXC; 11	SAP; 14	ABU; 14			14th	23
2023	BWT Alpine F1 Team	Alpine A523	Renault E-Tech 23 1.6 V6 t	BHR; 9	SAU; 9	AUS; 13†	AZE; 14	MIA; 8	MON; 7	ESP; 10	CAN; 12	AUT; 10	GBR; 18†	HUN; Ret	BEL; 11^{3}	NED; 3	ITA; 15	SIN; 6	JPN; 10	QAT; 12	USA; 6^{7}	MXC; 11	SAP; 7	LVG; 11	ABU; 13			11th	62
2024	BWT Alpine F1 Team	Alpine A524	Renault E-Tech 24 1.6 V6 t	BHR; 18	SAU; Ret	AUS; 13	JPN; 16	CHN; 13	MIA; 12	EMI; 16	MON; 10	CAN; 9	ESP; 9	AUT; 10	GBR; DNS	HUN; Ret	BEL; 13	NED; 9	ITA; 15	AZE; 12	SIN; 17	USA; 12	MXC; 10	SAP; 3^{7}	LVG; Ret	QAT; 5	ABU; 7	10th	42
2025	BWT Alpine F1 Team	Alpine A525	Renault E-Tech 25 1.6 V6 t	AUS; 11	CHN; DSQ	JPN; 13	BHR; 7	SAU; Ret	MIA; 13^{8}	EMI; 13	MON; Ret	ESP; 8	CAN; 15	AUT; 13	GBR; 6	BEL; 10	HUN; 19	NED; 17	ITA; 16	AZE; 18	SIN; 19	USA; 19	MXC; 15	SAP; 10^{8}	LVG; 13	QAT; 16	ABU; 19	18th	22
2026	BWT Alpine F1 Team	Alpine A526	Mercedes-AMG F1 M17 1.6 V6 t	AUS; 10	CHN; 6	JPN; 7	MIA; Ret^{8}	CAN; 8	MON; 7	BCN; 7	AUT; 13	GBR; 10	BEL; 11	HUN; 12	NED; 10^{8}	**ITA**; 7	ESP; 12	AZE; Ret	BHR; 16	SIN; 11	USA; 10	MXC; 17	SAP; 14	LVG	QAT	ABU		10th*	42*

^{†} Did not finish, but was classified as he had completed more than 90% of the race distance.
^{‡} Half points awarded as less than 75% of race distance was completed.
* Season still in progress.

Sporting positions
Preceded by Stoffel Vandoorne	Eurocup Formula Renault 2.0; Champion; 2013	Succeeded by Nyck de Vries
Preceded by Stoffel Vandoorne	GP2 Series; Champion; 2016	Succeeded by Charles Leclerc (FIA Formula 2)
Preceded by Kamui Kobayashi (2015)	Super Formula; Rookie Champion; 2017	Succeeded by Nobuharu Matsushita (2018)
