= Kika =

Kika may refer to:

== People ==
- Kika de la Garza (1927–2017), American politician
- Kika Edgar (born 1985), Mexican actress and singer
- Kika Karadi (born 1975), American contemporary artist
- Kika Markham (born 1940), English actress
- Kika Mirylees, British actress
- Kika Perez, Colombian-American actress and TV host
- Kika Nazareth (born 2002), Portuguese footballer
- Kristina Đukić (2000–2021), Serbian YouTuber
- Kika Gomes (born 2023), Portuguese fashion model and social media personality

== Other ==
- Foundation KiKa, a Dutch foundation for child cancer
- Kika (TV channel), a children's television channel based in Erfurt, Germany
- Kika (1993 film), a Spanish-language film
- Kika (2025 film), a French-language film by Alexe Poukine
- Kika (retailer), an Austrian chain of furniture stores
- Kika (Suikoden), a Suikoden character
- Tropical Storm Kika, a tropical cyclone in the central Pacific basin in the 2008
- KIKA, a fictional TV station in an episode of Monk
- "Kika", a Seakret song featuring MC Zaac and Feid
- "Kika", a 6ix9ine song featuring Tory Lanez from Dummy Boy

== See also ==
- Kikas (disambiguation)
- Cika
