= Francisca Cerqueira Gomes =

Portuguese model and social media personality

- Born: Maria Francisca Cerqueira Gomes Lourenço Gomes; 23 January 2003 (age 23); Porto, Portugal
- Other names: Kika Gomes; Kika Cerqueira Gomes
- Occupations: Model, social media personality
- Years active: 2018–present
- Notable work: Women'secret campaign (2023); Natura summer collection
- Parent: Maria Cerqueira Gomes (mother) Gonçalo Gomes (father)
- Modeling information
- Agency: Central Models

Maria Francisca Cerqueira Gomes Lourenço "Kika" Gomes (born 23 January 2003) is a Portuguese fashion model and social media personality.

== Early life ==
Francisca was born on 23 January 2003 in Porto, Portugal. She is the daughter of Maria Cerqueira Gomes, a well-known Portuguese television presenter, and Gonçalo Gomes, who is a car (auto) racing driver. She has three younger half-siblings: João (born in 2017) (from her mother's side) and two younger sisters, Pilar (born in 2022) and Victoria (born in 2026) (from her father's later relationship).

== Career ==
=== Acting ===
She played a role (Filipa) on the Portuguese TV show Festa é Festa (TVI). That casting attracted some criticism, partly because she was young (around 18) and initially without formal acting training. In response, she took a mini-course in acting through Plural, a production company.

=== Modeling ===
Over the past several years, Francisca Cerqueira Gomes has collaborated with numerous Portuguese and international fashion and beauty brands. She is represented by Central Models in Portugal and Elite Model Agency internationally.

In 2021, she starred in the "Alma" swimwear campaign by Cantê.

In 2022, She became one of the faces of the Natura Portugal "summer/lookbook" campaign with her mother Maria Cerqueira Gomes. They were "new faces" / "ambassadors" for Natura Portugal. Continued building her presence as a model and influencer; brand associations (Parfois, Carolina Herrera, Rituals) are mentioned in more general profiles around this time.

In March 2024, she was announced as the new ambassador for the Spanish footwear brand XTI, for their "You by You" campaign (spring-summer collection) of shoes, sneakers, etc.

In September 2025, she made history by being the first Portuguese model to walk in Le Défilé da L'Oréal Paris (the L'Oréal Paris fashion show) in Paris. She is continuing her collaborations / presence in fashion & beauty campaigns (brand-events, red carpets, etc.). Specific new brand names beyond L'Oréal and XTI that were reported in 2025. In August she appeared on Elle Hungary either

== Personal life ==
She has been doing schooling related to marketing and has moved to Paris, partly for her career and studies. Since 2022, she has been in a relationship with Pierre Gasly, a French Formula 1 racing driver. They made their relationship public during 2022 and attend many events together.
