= Kika Perez =

Colombian American actress

Ilva Margarita "Kika" Perez is a Colombian-American actress and television presenter of Spanish descent. She is also known for being a writer and poet.

Perez has hosted a series of U.S. Hispanic Network television shows, starred in independent films and written for various publications and online sites. She is also known for her controversial bilingual written commentary and the online site El Sancocho Chronicles.

She played "Lizzie Dark" in award-winning director Rolfe Kanefsky's neo-noir independent film One in the Gun, released in 2009.

In 2009, she joined the cast of Nickelodeon Latin America's hit show Isa TK+ as Zafiro.

== Career ==
Perez obtained a Communications and Journalism degree in Universidad del Norte (Colombia) in 2001 (receiving a medal for Academic Excellence) and moved to the States soon after. She then began studies at the Creative Workshops School of Acting, where artists like Gloria Estefan (Music of the Heart) and fellow national, actress Sofia Vergara also got their training.

== Television ==
In 2002, Perez joined the cast of Mun2 Network's Award Winning Talk Show, Chat; a controversial bilingual talk show voicing the points of views and experiences of young Hispanics living in the States. Chat was awarded a "Shine Award" in 2002 and a nomination the following year as "Best Latino Broadcast Variety Show."

Perez hosted other Mun2 shows like Full Access and the 411 News on the urban hit show The Roof. She later to co-hosted NBC-Telemundo's show Ritmo y Sabor, one of the first Entertainment Reggaeton Music Variety Shows in a Major Hispanic Network, featuring urban, tropical and mainstream Pop artists, interviewing musicians like Alejandro Sanz and Russel Simmons. Perez was also invited to Guest Star on a few Univision Network's variety shows. She visited Tu Desayuno Alegre, next to Mexican hosts Carlos Gastelum and Jessica Fox and, A Tu Estilo, where she interviewed two time Latin Grammy nominee musician Ines Gaviria.

Perez also had small roles in Univision's Spanish language Telenovelas Secreto de Amor and Gata Salvaje.

In 2009, Perez joined Nickelodeon Latin America, Nick's hit show ISA TKM. She appears in the second season, ISA TK+ as Zafiro.

== Film ==
Perez played a blonde Latina in Daniel Zirilli's Independent flick Latin Kingz, released in 2003. Perez then joined the cast of Independent Film Estados (Argentina), as "Gabriella," opposite Mexican actor Alfonso de Anda, which won an award for Best Latin Film in the "Made in Miami" Film Festival. Perez also starred in the short films like The Asylum for Mac Vision Entertainment and also worked as the lead in Ecuadorian writer/director Ivan Ehlers's Vlad and Antoinette.

Year	Title	Role
2002	BIRTHRIGHT	Tanya
2002	LATIN KINGZ	Martha
2003	ESTADOS	Gabriella
2006	THE DAVID ORTH PROJECT	Evelyn
2008	THE ASYLUM	Mitzy
2008	ONE IN THE GUN	Lizzie
2008	VLAD AND ANTOINETTE	Antoinette
2009	ISA TK+	ZAFIRO

== Writing ==
Perez has written articles for publications like U.S. Hispanic Music Publication Batanga Magazine and hosted Batanga.com Specials (see other activities, below), amongst others, including copy for bilingual advertising agencies and entertainment websites. Her poetry is an intricate part of her creative life and a few of her pieces have been published. Forever Spoken, an ongoing publication by "The International Library of Poets" features her entry: My Ruse. She has also contributed to online sites like DailyCents.com, writing articles about U.S. Hispanic Politics.

== Others ==
Perez hosted Batanga.com's "Jeep's New Artist Adventure," a Documentary where she showcased Mexican Rock en Español Band Leche's record making process in Miami with producer Sebastian Krys. She was featured as Batanga.com's Latin Female of the month.

== Sources ==
- http://www.kikaperez.com
- Kika Perez at IMDb
- http://www.1inthegun.com, Official Film Site
- http://www.actorsaccess.com
- THE MEDIA PROJECT:
  - http://themediaproject/shine/2002.html
  - http://themediaproject/shine/2003.html
- http://www.BatangaMagazine.com, Leche Band, Jeep's New Artist Adventure 2005: Hosted by Kika *Perez Batanga Magazine Publication, issue 11
- Forever Spoken, Copyright (C) 2007, International Library of Poetry One Poetry Plaza Owings Mills, MD21117
- https://web.archive.org/web/20081217073236/http://dailycents.com/
- Mun2 Host pages: Kika Perez, Host for Mun2, 2002–2003

Telemundo Host pages, Kika Perez, Host for Telemundo 2003-2004

  - http://www.becomeahost.com
  - http://www.madeinmiami.org
