= Kikas =

Kikas may refer to:

- Anton Kikaš (born 1941), Croatian-Canadian businessman and arms-smuggler
- Don Kikas (born 1974), Angolan singer
- Frederico Morais (born 1992), Portuguese surfer also known as Kikas
- "Kikaš" the Boeing 707 captured from Anton Kikaš and used in the evacuation of civilians from Sarajevo in 1992
- Kikas Gomes (born 1980), Angolan basketball player
- Kikas (Angolan footballer) (born 1981), Angolan footballer
- Kikas (footballer, born 1991), Portuguese footballer who plays as a midfielder
- Kikas (footballer, born 1998), Portuguese footballer who plays as a forward

== See also ==
- Kika (disambiguation)
- Kikkas
