= Kaupo Kikkas =

Estonian photographer

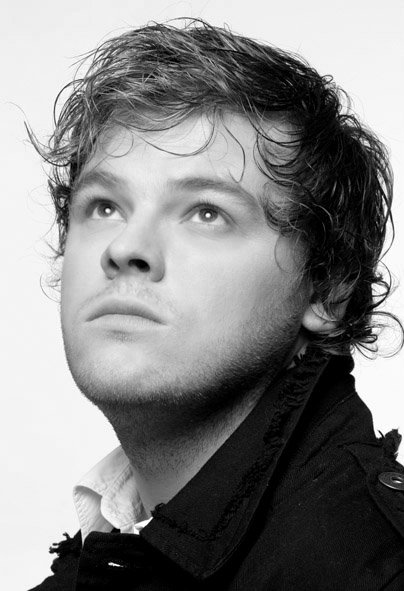
- Kaupo Kikkas in 2006
- Born: Tallinn, then part of Estonian SSR, Soviet Union
- Occupation: Photographer

Kaupo Kikkas is an Estonian fine art photographer.

== Life and work ==
He graduated Tallinn Music High School, but switched from music to photography instead. He has often photographed people in the field of music, like Arvo Pärt, etc.

He specialises in photographing people related to classical music.

== Awards ==
In 2009 he won 1st, 2nd, and 3rd prizes in the group portrait category of the Wedding and Portrait Photographers International competition.

In 2012 he won the portrait photography category in Wedding and Portrait Photography Baltic 2012.

== Books ==
- Amazonas. Elu ainus foto. 2013. ISBN 9789949941858.

== Gallery ==
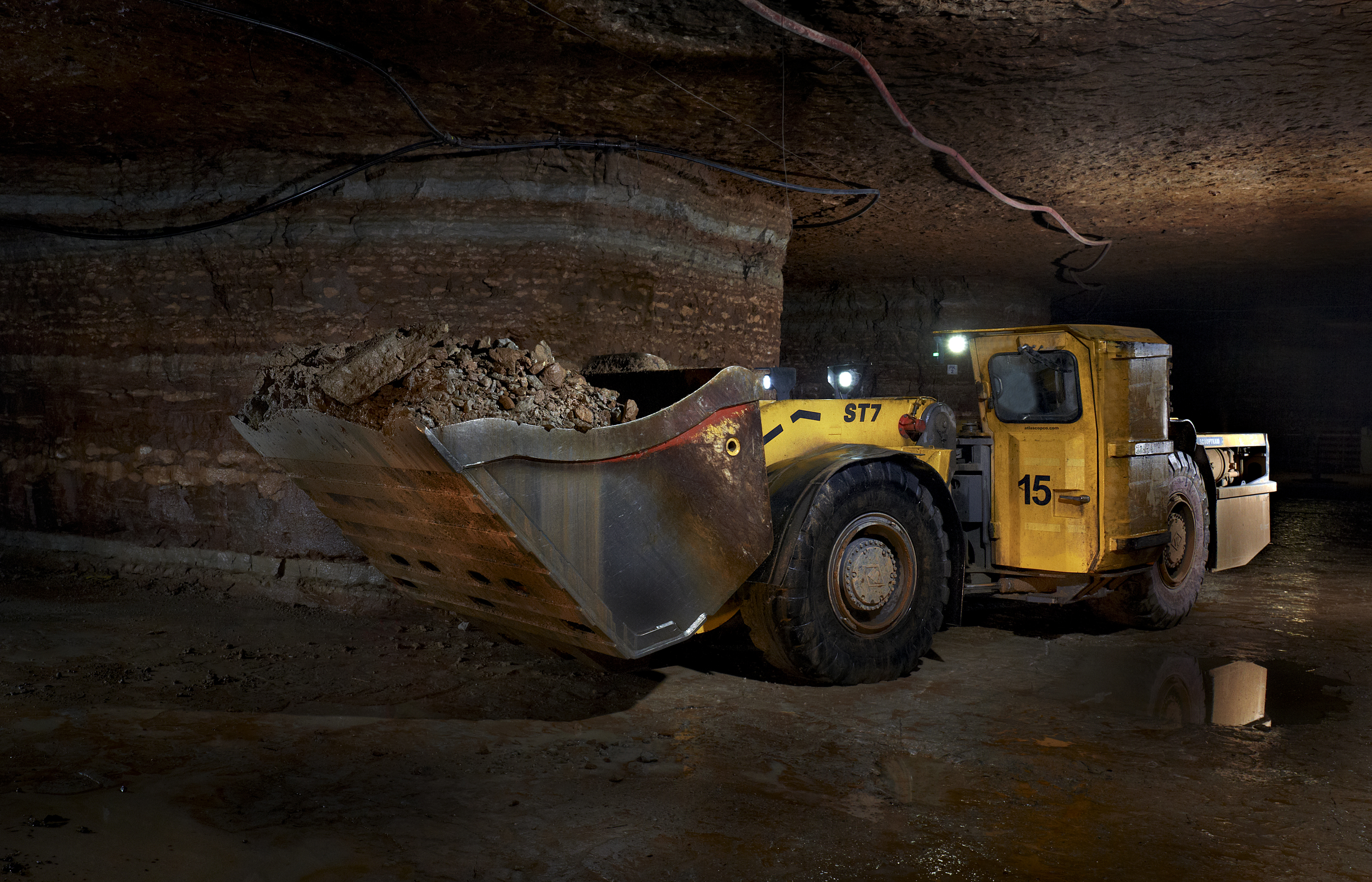
VKG Ojamaa mine

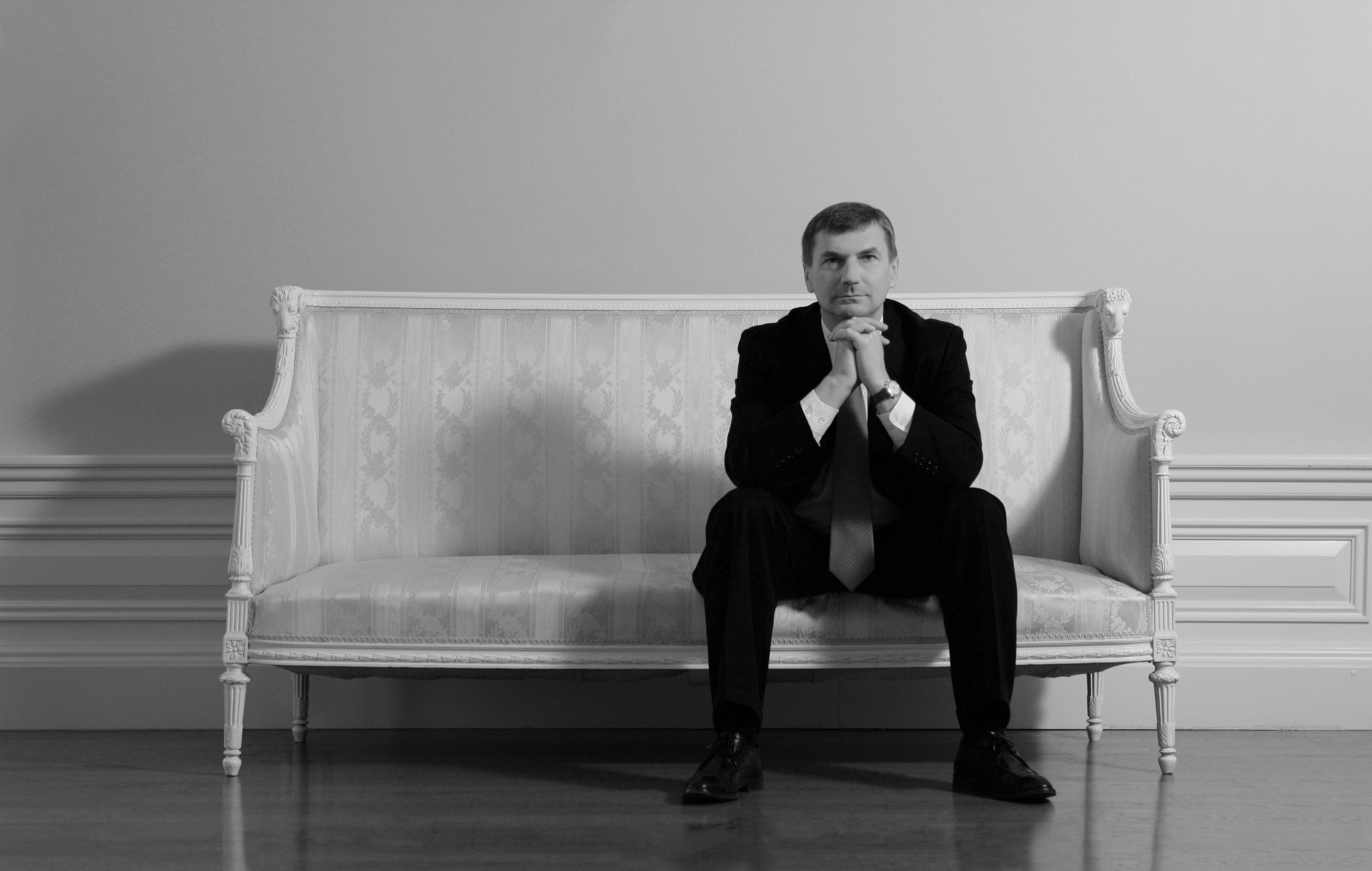
Andrus Ansip

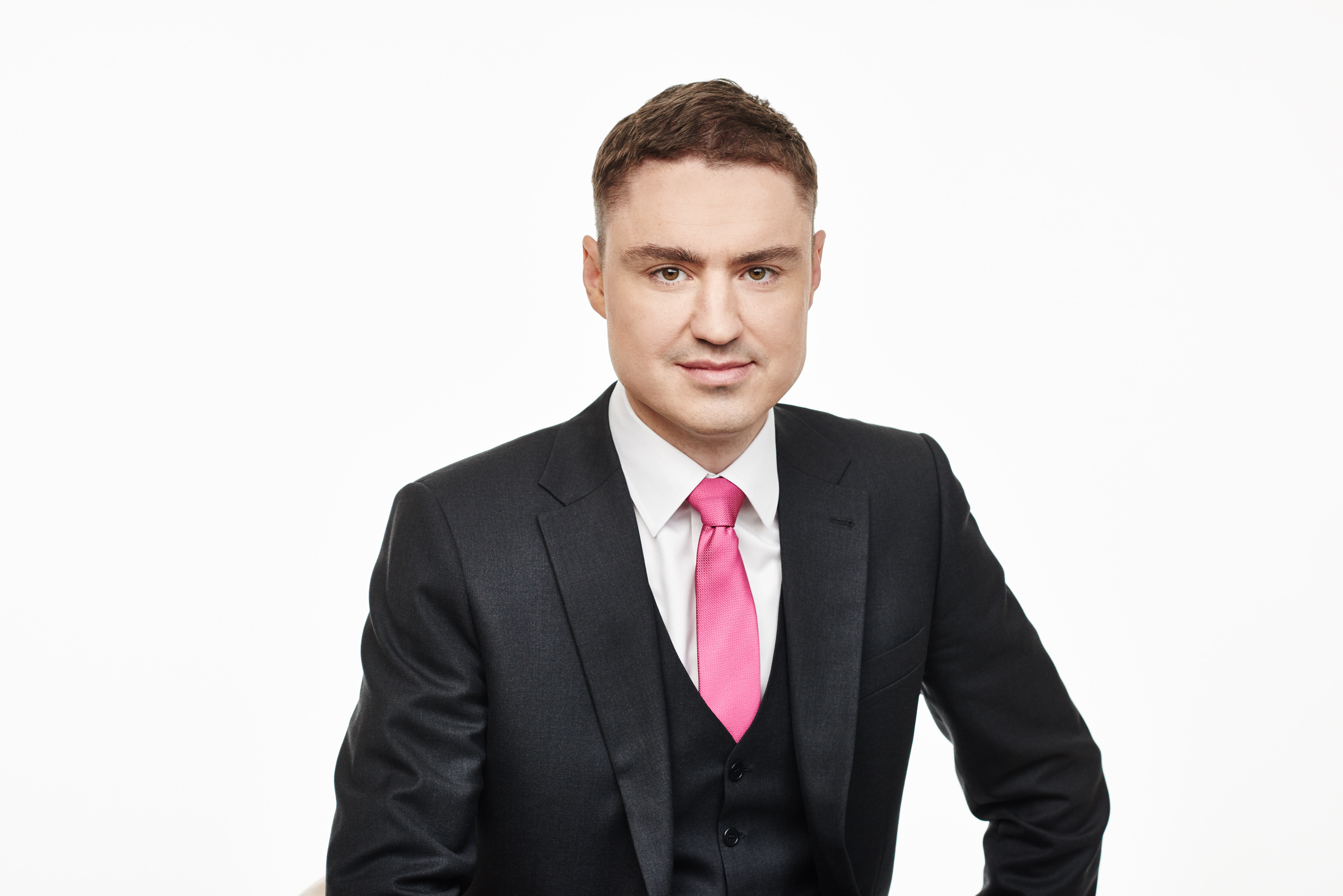
Taavi Rõivas

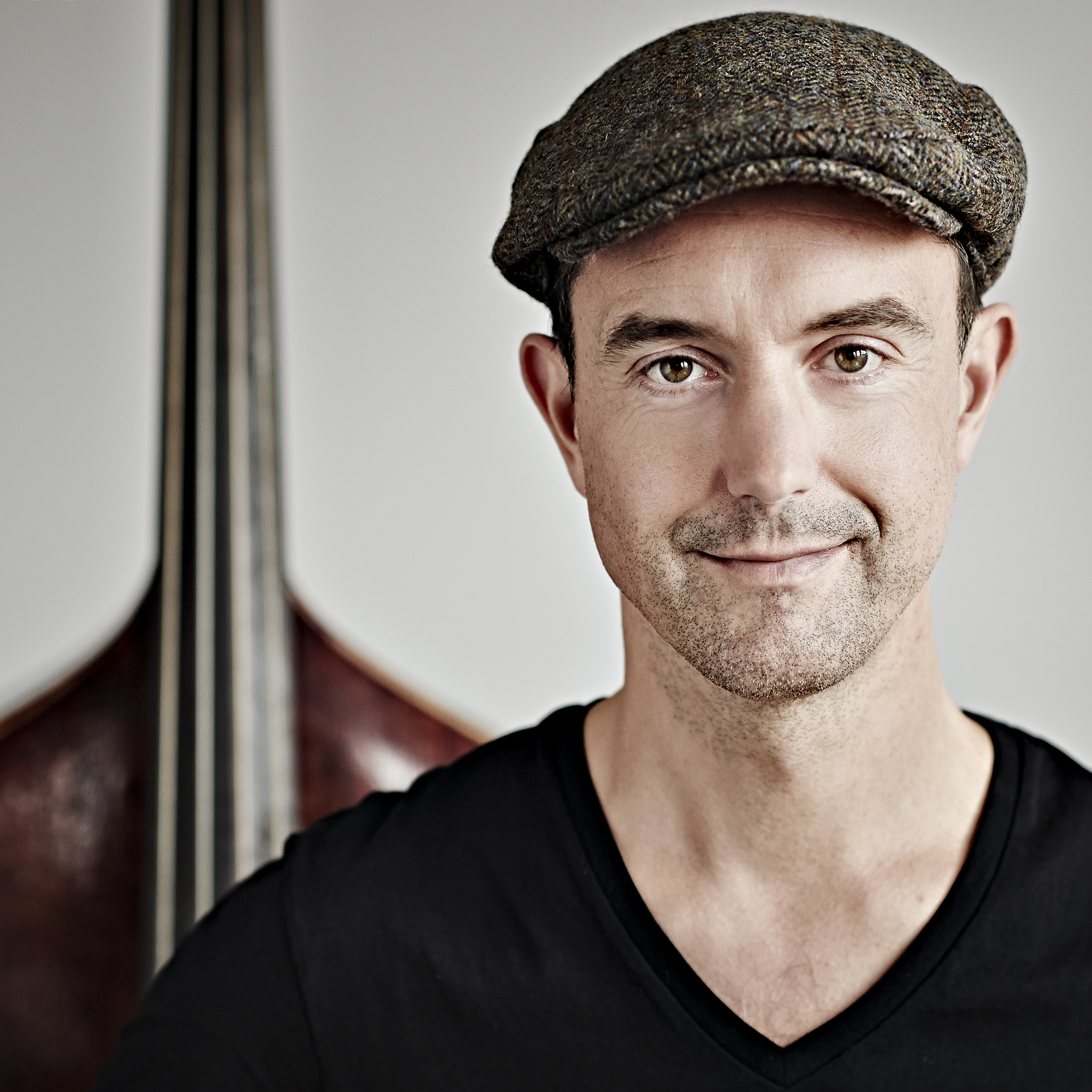
Florian Dohrmann

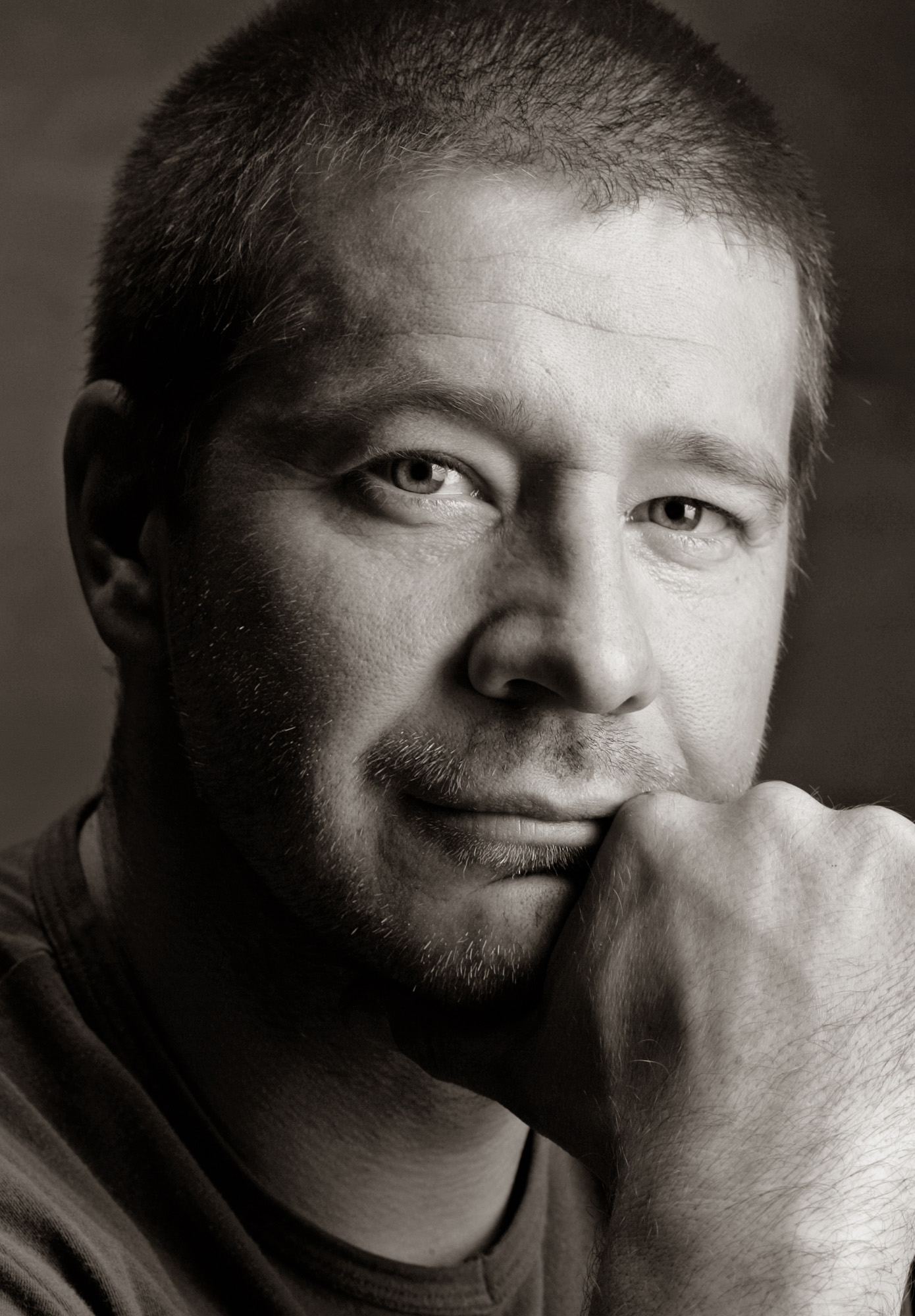
Marko Matvere

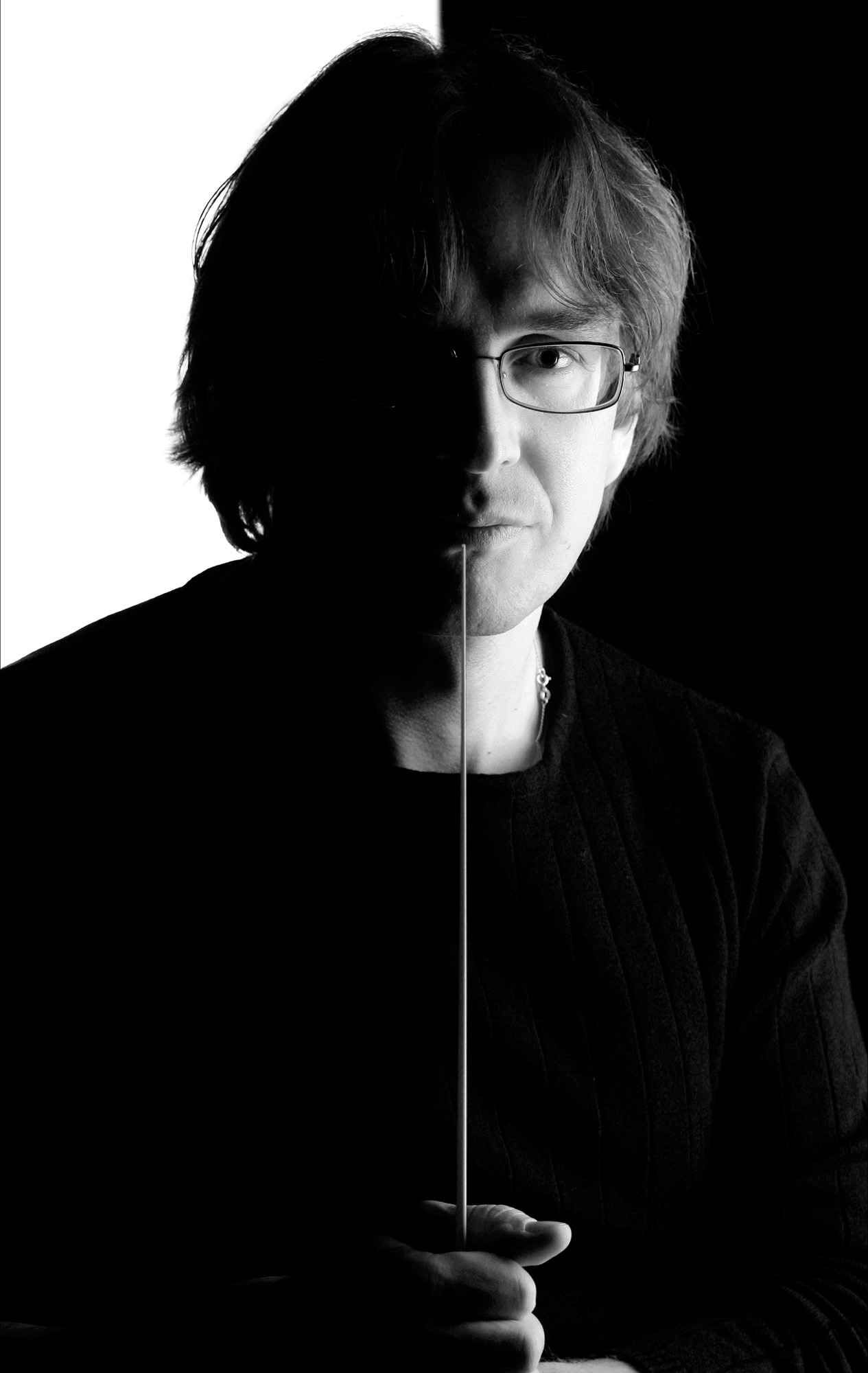
Toomas Vavilov
