= 2022 6 Hours of Monza =

Endurance sports car racing event

Coordinates: 45°36′56″N 9°16′52″E

(Italy) 2022 6 Hours of Monza
Event information
- Round 4 of 6 in the 2022 FIA World Endurance Championship
- Date: 10 July 2022
- Location: Monza
- Venue: Autodromo Nazionale di Monza
- Duration: 6 Hours

Results
- Laps completed: 194
- Distance (km): 1123.842
- Distance (miles): 698.4
- Hypercar

Pole position
- Time: 1:35.416
- Team: (United States) Glickenhaus Racing

Winners
- Team: (France) Alpine Elf Team
- Drivers: (France) Nicolas Lapierre (Brazil) André Negrão (France) Matthieu Vaxivière
- LMP2

Winners
- Team: (Switzerland) RealTeam by WRT
- Drivers: (Portugal) Rui Andrade (Austria) Ferdinand Habsburg (France) Norman Nato
- LMP2 Pro-Am

Winners
- Team: (Portugal) Algarve Pro Racing
- Drivers: (Australia) James Allen (Austria) René Binder (United States) Steven Thomas
- LMGTE Pro

Winners
- Team: (United States) Corvette Racing
- Drivers: (United States) Tommy Milner (United Kingdom) Nick Tandy
- LMGTE Am

Winners
- Team: (Germany) Dempsey-Proton Racing
- Drivers: (United Kingdom) Sebastian Priaulx (Germany) Christian Ried (United Kingdom) Harry Tincknell

The 2022 6 Hours of Monza was an endurance sports car racing event held at the Autodromo Nazionale di Monza, Monza, Italy on 10 July 2022. It was the fourth round of the 2022 FIA World Endurance Championship is the final race before the summer break, and was the second running of the event as part of the championship.

== Entry list ==
The entry list was revealed on 20 May 2022. This race marked the début of the Peugeot 9X8, the Le Mans Hypercar built by Peugeot Sport. This was also the first race of the season without the No. 5 Team Penske LMP2 machine.

== Qualifying ==
=== Qualifying results ===
Pole position winners in each class are marked in bold.

Pos	Class	Team	Time	Gap	Grid
1	**Hypercar**	**No. 708 Glickenhaus Racing**	**1:35.416**	-	**1**
2	Hypercar	No. 8 Toyota Gazoo Racing	1:36.335	+0.919	2
3	Hypercar	No. 36 Alpine Elf Team	1:36.489	+1.073	3
4	Hypercar	No. 7 Toyota Gazoo Racing	1:36.919	+1.503	4
5	Hypercar	No. 94 Peugeot TotalEnergies	1:37.253	+1.837	5
6	**LMP2**	**No. 22 United Autosports USA**	**1:38.403**	**+2.987**	**6**
7	**LMP2 Pro-Am**	**No. 44 ARC Bratislava**	**1:38.731**	**+3.315**	**7**
8	LMP2	No. 41 RealTeam by WRT	1:38.780	+3.364	8
9	LMP2 Pro-Am	No. 83 AF Corse	1:38.817	+3.401	9
10	LMP2 Pro-Am	No. 45 Algarve Pro Racing	1:39.122	+3.706	10
11	LMP2	No. 9 Prema Orlen Team	1:39.203	+3.787	11
12	LMP2	No. 10 Vector Sport	1:39.481	+4.065	12
13	LMP2	No. 31 WRT	1:39.654	+4.238	13
14	LMP2	No. 1 Richard Mille Racing Team	1:39.682	+4.266	14
15	LMP2	No. 34 Inter Europol Competition	1:39.692	+4.276	15
16	LMP2 Pro-Am	No. 35 Ultimate	1:40.387	+4.971	16
17	LMP2	No. 28 Jota	1:44.763	+9.347	17
18	**LMGTE Pro**	**No. 51 AF Corse**	**1:45.270**	**+9.854**	**18**
19	LMGTE Pro	No. 64 Corvette Racing	1:45.324	+9.908	19
20	LMGTE Pro	No. 52 AF Corse	1:45.328	+9.912	20
21	LMGTE Pro	No. 91 Porsche GT Team	1:45.804	+10.388	21
22	LMGTE Pro	No. 92 Porsche GT Team	1:46.024	+10.608	22
23	**LMGTE Am**	**No. 85 Iron Dames**	**1:47.431**	**+12.015**	**23**
24	LMGTE Am	No. 33 TF Sport	1:47.658	+12.242	24
25	LMGTE Am	No. 77 Dempsey-Proton Racing	1:48.206	+12.790	25
26	LMGTE Am	No. 21 AF Corse	1:48.296	+12.880	26
27	LMGTE Am	No. 54 AF Corse	1:48.406	+12.990	27
28	LMGTE Am	No. 98 Northwest AMR	1:48.534	+13.118	28
29	LMGTE Am	No. 56 Team Project 1	1:48.813	+13.397	29
30	LMGTE Am	No. 86 GR Racing	1:48.842	+13.426	30
31	LMGTE Am	No. 777 D'Station Racing	1:48.957	+13.541	31
32	LMGTE Am	No. 46 Team Project 1	1:48.966	+13.550	32
33	LMGTE Am	No. 71 Spirit of Race	1:49.990	+14.574	33
34	LMGTE Am	No. 88 Dempsey-Proton Racing	1:50.221	+14.805	34
35	LMGTE Am	No. 60 Iron Lynx	1:50.296	+14.880	35
36	LMP2	No. 23 United Autosports USA	No Time	—	36
37	LMP2	No. 38 Jota	No Time	—	37
38	Hypercar	No. 93 Peugeot TotalEnergies	No Time	—	38

== Race ==
=== Race Result ===
The minimum number of laps for classification (70% of overall winning car's distance) was 136 laps. Class winners are in bold and ‡.

Final race classification
Pos	Class	No	Team	Drivers	Chassis	Tyre	Laps	Time/Retired
Pos	Class	No	Team	Drivers	Engine	Tyre	Laps	Time/Retired
1	**Hypercar**	**36**	**(France) Alpine Elf Team**	**(France) Nicolas Lapierre (Brazil) André Negrão (France) Matthieu Vaxivière**	**Alpine A480**	MI	**194**	**6:00:47.738‡**
1	**Hypercar**	**36**	**(France) Alpine Elf Team**	**(France) Nicolas Lapierre (Brazil) André Negrão (France) Matthieu Vaxivière**	**Gibson GL458 4.5 L V8**	MI	**194**	**6:00:47.738‡**
2	Hypercar	8	(Japan) Toyota Gazoo Racing	(Switzerland) Sébastien Buemi (New Zealand) Brendon Hartley (Japan) Ryō Hirakawa	Toyota GR010 Hybrid	MI	194	+2.762
2	Hypercar	8	(Japan) Toyota Gazoo Racing	(Switzerland) Sébastien Buemi (New Zealand) Brendon Hartley (Japan) Ryō Hirakawa	Toyota H8909 3.5 L Turbo V6	MI	194	+2.762
3	Hypercar	7	(Japan) Toyota Gazoo Racing	(United Kingdom) Mike Conway (Japan) Kamui Kobayashi (Argentina) José María López	Toyota GR010 Hybrid	MI	192	+2 Laps
3	Hypercar	7	(Japan) Toyota Gazoo Racing	(United Kingdom) Mike Conway (Japan) Kamui Kobayashi (Argentina) José María López	Toyota H8909 3.5 L Turbo V6	MI	192	+2 Laps
4	**LMP2**	**41**	**(Switzerland) RealTeam by WRT**	**(Portugal) Rui Andrade (Austria) Ferdinand Habsburg (France) Norman Nato**	**Oreca 07**	G	**188**	**+6 Laps‡**
4	**LMP2**	**41**	**(Switzerland) RealTeam by WRT**	**(Portugal) Rui Andrade (Austria) Ferdinand Habsburg (France) Norman Nato**	**Gibson GK428 4.2 L V8**	G	**188**	**+6 Laps‡**
5	LMP2	38	(United Kingdom) Jota	(Portugal) António Félix da Costa (Mexico) Roberto González (United Kingdom) Will Stevens	Oreca 07	G	188	+6 Laps
5	LMP2	38	(United Kingdom) Jota	(Portugal) António Félix da Costa (Mexico) Roberto González (United Kingdom) Will Stevens	Gibson GK428 4.2 L V8	G	188	+6 Laps
6	LMP2	10	(United Kingdom) Vector Sport	(Republic of Ireland) Ryan Cullen (Switzerland) Nico Müller (France) Sébastien Bourdais	Oreca 07	G	188	+6 Laps
6	LMP2	10	(United Kingdom) Vector Sport	(Republic of Ireland) Ryan Cullen (Switzerland) Nico Müller (France) Sébastien Bourdais	Gibson GK428 4.2 L V8	G	188	+6 Laps
7	LMP2	34	(Poland) Inter Europol Competition	(Mexico) Esteban Gutiérrez (Poland) Jakub Śmiechowski (United Kingdom) Alex Brundle	Oreca 07	G	188	+6 Laps
7	LMP2	34	(Poland) Inter Europol Competition	(Mexico) Esteban Gutiérrez (Poland) Jakub Śmiechowski (United Kingdom) Alex Brundle	Gibson GK428 4.2 L V8	G	188	+6 Laps
8	LMP2	23	(United States) United Autosports USA	(United Kingdom) Oliver Jarvis (United States) Josh Pierson (United Kingdom) Alex Lynn	Oreca 07	G	188	+6 Laps
8	LMP2	23	(United States) United Autosports USA	(United Kingdom) Oliver Jarvis (United States) Josh Pierson (United Kingdom) Alex Lynn	Gibson GK428 4.2 L V8	G	188	+6 Laps
9	LMP2	9	(Italy) Prema Orlen Team	(Italy) Lorenzo Colombo (Switzerland) Louis Delétraz (Poland) Robert Kubica	Oreca 07	G	188	+6 Laps
9	LMP2	9	(Italy) Prema Orlen Team	(Italy) Lorenzo Colombo (Switzerland) Louis Delétraz (Poland) Robert Kubica	Gibson GK428 4.2 L V8	G	188	+6 Laps
10	**LMP2 Pro-Am**	**45**	**(Portugal) Algarve Pro Racing**	**(Australia) James Allen (Austria) René Binder (United States) Steven Thomas**	**Oreca 07**	G	**187**	**+7 Laps‡**
10	**LMP2 Pro-Am**	**45**	**(Portugal) Algarve Pro Racing**	**(Australia) James Allen (Austria) René Binder (United States) Steven Thomas**	**Gibson GK428 4.2 L V8**	G	**187**	**+7 Laps‡**
11	LMP2 Pro-Am	35	(France) Ultimate	(France) François Hériau (France) Jean-Baptiste Lahaye (France) Matthieu Lahaye	Oreca 07	G	187	+7 Laps
11	LMP2 Pro-Am	35	(France) Ultimate	(France) François Hériau (France) Jean-Baptiste Lahaye (France) Matthieu Lahaye	Gibson GK428 4.2 L V8	G	187	+7 Laps
12	LMP2 Pro-Am	83	(Italy) AF Corse	(Denmark) Nicklas Nielsen (France) François Perrodo (Italy) Alessio Rovera	Oreca 07	G	187	+7 Laps
12	LMP2 Pro-Am	83	(Italy) AF Corse	(Denmark) Nicklas Nielsen (France) François Perrodo (Italy) Alessio Rovera	Gibson GK428 4.2 L V8	G	187	+7 Laps
13	LMP2	28	(United Kingdom) Jota	(South Africa) Jonathan Aberdein (United Arab Emirates) Ed Jones (Denmark) Oliver Rasmussen	Oreca 07	G	186	+8 Laps
13	LMP2	28	(United Kingdom) Jota	(South Africa) Jonathan Aberdein (United Arab Emirates) Ed Jones (Denmark) Oliver Rasmussen	Gibson GK428 4.2 L V8	G	186	+8 Laps
14	LMP2 Pro-Am	44	(Slovakia) ARC Bratislava	(Netherlands) Tijmen van der Helm (Slovakia) Miroslav Konôpka (Switzerland) Mathias Beche	Oreca 07	G	186	+8 Laps
14	LMP2 Pro-Am	44	(Slovakia) ARC Bratislava	(Netherlands) Tijmen van der Helm (Slovakia) Miroslav Konôpka (Switzerland) Mathias Beche	Gibson GK428 4.2 L V8	G	186	+8 Laps
15	**LMGTE Pro**	**64**	**(United States) Corvette Racing**	**(United States) Tommy Milner (United Kingdom) Nick Tandy**	**Chevrolet Corvette C8.R**	MI	**181**	**+13 Laps‡**
15	**LMGTE Pro**	**64**	**(United States) Corvette Racing**	**(United States) Tommy Milner (United Kingdom) Nick Tandy**	**Chevrolet 5.5 L V8**	MI	**181**	**+13 Laps‡**
16	LMGTE Pro	52	(Italy) AF Corse	(Italy) Antonio Fuoco (Spain) Miguel Molina	Ferrari 488 GTE Evo	MI	181	+13 Laps
16	LMGTE Pro	52	(Italy) AF Corse	(Italy) Antonio Fuoco (Spain) Miguel Molina	Ferrari F154CB 3.9 L Turbo V8	MI	181	+13 Laps
17	LMGTE Pro	51	(Italy) AF Corse	(United Kingdom) James Calado (Italy) Alessandro Pier Guidi	Ferrari 488 GTE Evo	MI	181	+13 Laps
17	LMGTE Pro	51	(Italy) AF Corse	(United Kingdom) James Calado (Italy) Alessandro Pier Guidi	Ferrari F154CB 3.9 L Turbo V8	MI	181	+13 Laps
18	LMGTE Pro	92	(Germany) Porsche GT Team	(Denmark) Michael Christensen (France) Kévin Estre	Porsche 911 RSR-19	MI	181	+13 Laps
18	LMGTE Pro	92	(Germany) Porsche GT Team	(Denmark) Michael Christensen (France) Kévin Estre	Porsche 4.2 L Flat-6	MI	181	+13 Laps
19	LMGTE Pro	91	(Germany) Porsche GT Team	(Italy) Gianmaria Bruni (France) Frédéric Makowiecki	Porsche 911 RSR-19	MI	180	+14 Laps
19	LMGTE Pro	91	(Germany) Porsche GT Team	(Italy) Gianmaria Bruni (France) Frédéric Makowiecki	Porsche 4.2 L Flat-6	MI	180	+14 Laps
20	**LMGTE Am**	**77**	**(Germany) Dempsey-Proton Racing**	**(United Kingdom) Sebastian Priaulx (Germany) Christian Ried (United Kingdom) Harry Tincknell**	**Porsche 911 RSR-19**	MI	**179**	**+15 Laps‡**
20	**LMGTE Am**	**77**	**(Germany) Dempsey-Proton Racing**	**(United Kingdom) Sebastian Priaulx (Germany) Christian Ried (United Kingdom) Harry Tincknell**	**Porsche 4.2 L Flat-6**	MI	**179**	**+15 Laps‡**
21	LMP2	31	(Belgium) WRT	(Netherlands) Robin Frijns (Indonesia) Sean Gelael (Germany) René Rast	Oreca 07	G	178	+16 Laps
21	LMP2	31	(Belgium) WRT	(Netherlands) Robin Frijns (Indonesia) Sean Gelael (Germany) René Rast	Gibson GK428 4.2 L V8	G	178	+16 Laps
22	LMGTE Am	85	(Italy) Iron Dames	(Belgium) Sarah Bovy (Switzerland) Rahel Frey (Denmark) Michelle Gatting	Ferrari 488 GTE Evo	MI	178	+16 Laps
22	LMGTE Am	85	(Italy) Iron Dames	(Belgium) Sarah Bovy (Switzerland) Rahel Frey (Denmark) Michelle Gatting	Ferrari F154CB 3.9 L Turbo V8	MI	178	+16 Laps
23	LMP2	22	(United States) United Autosports USA	(Portugal) Filipe Albuquerque (United Kingdom) Philip Hanson (United States) Will Owen	Oreca 07	G	178	+16 Laps
23	LMP2	22	(United States) United Autosports USA	(Portugal) Filipe Albuquerque (United Kingdom) Philip Hanson (United States) Will Owen	Gibson GK428 4.2 L V8	G	178	+16 Laps
24	LMGTE Am	46	(Germany) Team Project 1	(Italy) Matteo Cairoli (Switzerland) Nicolas Leutwiler (Denmark) Mikkel O. Pedersen	Porsche 911 RSR-19	MI	178	+16 Laps
24	LMGTE Am	46	(Germany) Team Project 1	(Italy) Matteo Cairoli (Switzerland) Nicolas Leutwiler (Denmark) Mikkel O. Pedersen	Porsche 4.2 L Flat-6	MI	178	+16 Laps
25	LMGTE Am	60	(Italy) Iron Lynx	(Italy) Matteo Cressoni (Italy) Giancarlo Fisichella (Italy) Claudio Schiavoni	Ferrari 488 GTE Evo	MI	178	+16 Laps
25	LMGTE Am	60	(Italy) Iron Lynx	(Italy) Matteo Cressoni (Italy) Giancarlo Fisichella (Italy) Claudio Schiavoni	Ferrari F154CB 3.9 L Turbo V8	MI	178	+16 Laps
26	LMGTE Am	71	(Switzerland) Spirit of Race	(France) Gabriel Aubry (France) Franck Dezoteux (France) Pierre Ragues	Ferrari 488 GTE Evo	MI	177	+17 Laps
26	LMGTE Am	71	(Switzerland) Spirit of Race	(France) Gabriel Aubry (France) Franck Dezoteux (France) Pierre Ragues	Ferrari F154CB 3.9 L Turbo V8	MI	177	+17 Laps
27	LMGTE Am	88	(Germany) Dempsey-Proton Racing	(United States) Patrick Lindsey (United States) Fred Poordad (Belgium) Jan Heylen	Porsche 911 RSR-19	MI	177	+17 Laps
27	LMGTE Am	88	(Germany) Dempsey-Proton Racing	(United States) Patrick Lindsey (United States) Fred Poordad (Belgium) Jan Heylen	Porsche 4.2 L Flat-6	MI	177	+17 Laps
28	LMGTE Am	21	(Italy) AF Corse	(United States) Simon Mann (Switzerland) Christoph Ulrich (Finland) Toni Vilander	Ferrari 488 GTE Evo	MI	177	+17 Laps
28	LMGTE Am	21	(Italy) AF Corse	(United States) Simon Mann (Switzerland) Christoph Ulrich (Finland) Toni Vilander	Ferrari F154CB 3.9 L Turbo V8	MI	177	+17 Laps
29	LMGTE Am	98	(Canada) Northwest AMR	(Canada) Paul Dalla Lana (Denmark) Nicki Thiim (United Kingdom) David Pittard	Aston Martin Vantage AMR	MI	177	+17 Laps
29	LMGTE Am	98	(Canada) Northwest AMR	(Canada) Paul Dalla Lana (Denmark) Nicki Thiim (United Kingdom) David Pittard	Aston Martin 4.0 L Turbo V8	MI	177	+17 Laps
30	LMGTE Am	54	(Italy) AF Corse	(New Zealand) Nick Cassidy (Italy) Francesco Castellacci (Switzerland) Thomas Flohr	Ferrari 488 GTE Evo	MI	177	+17 Laps
30	LMGTE Am	54	(Italy) AF Corse	(New Zealand) Nick Cassidy (Italy) Francesco Castellacci (Switzerland) Thomas Flohr	Ferrari F154CB 3.9 L Turbo V8	MI	177	+17 Laps
31	LMGTE Am	56	(Germany) Team Project 1	(United Kingdom) Ben Barnicoat (United States) Brendan Iribe (United Kingdom) Ollie Millroy	Porsche 911 RSR-19	MI	176	+18 Laps
31	LMGTE Am	56	(Germany) Team Project 1	(United Kingdom) Ben Barnicoat (United States) Brendan Iribe (United Kingdom) Ollie Millroy	Porsche 4.2 L Flat-6	MI	176	+18 Laps
32	LMGTE Am	777	(Japan) D'Station Racing	(United Kingdom) Charlie Fagg (Japan) Tomonobu Fujii (Japan) Satoshi Hoshino	Aston Martin Vantage AMR	MI	171	+23 Laps
32	LMGTE Am	777	(Japan) D'Station Racing	(United Kingdom) Charlie Fagg (Japan) Tomonobu Fujii (Japan) Satoshi Hoshino	Aston Martin 4.0 L Turbo V8	MI	171	+23 Laps
33	Hypercar	94	(France) Peugeot TotalEnergies	(France) Loïc Duval (United States) Gustavo Menezes (United Kingdom) James Rossiter	Peugeot 9X8	MI	169	+25 Laps
33	Hypercar	94	(France) Peugeot TotalEnergies	(France) Loïc Duval (United States) Gustavo Menezes (United Kingdom) James Rossiter	Peugeot X6H 2.6 L Turbo V6	MI	169	+25 Laps
34	LMGTE Am	86	(United Kingdom) GR Racing	(United Kingdom) Ben Barker (Italy) Riccardo Pera (United Kingdom) Michael Wainwright	Porsche 911 RSR-19	MI	163	+31 Laps
34	LMGTE Am	86	(United Kingdom) GR Racing	(United Kingdom) Ben Barker (Italy) Riccardo Pera (United Kingdom) Michael Wainwright	Porsche 4.2 L Flat-6	MI	163	+31 Laps
35	LMP2	1	(France) Richard Mille Racing Team	(France) Charles Milesi (France) Paul-Loup Chatin (France) Lilou Wadoux	Oreca 07	G	146	+48 Laps
35	LMP2	1	(France) Richard Mille Racing Team	(France) Charles Milesi (France) Paul-Loup Chatin (France) Lilou Wadoux	Gibson GK428 4.2 L V8	G	146	+48 Laps
Ret	Hypercar	708	(United States) Glickenhaus Racing	(France) Romain Dumas (France) Olivier Pla (Brazil) Pipo Derani	Glickenhaus SCG 007 LMH	MI	96	Turbocharger
Ret	Hypercar	708	(United States) Glickenhaus Racing	(France) Romain Dumas (France) Olivier Pla (Brazil) Pipo Derani	Glickenhaus P21 3.5 L Turbo V8	MI	96	Turbocharger
Ret	LMGTE Am	33	(United Kingdom) TF Sport	(United States) Ben Keating (Denmark) Marco Sørensen (Portugal) Henrique Chaves	Aston Martin Vantage AMR	MI	73	Crash
Ret	LMGTE Am	33	(United Kingdom) TF Sport	(United States) Ben Keating (Denmark) Marco Sørensen (Portugal) Henrique Chaves	Aston Martin 4.0 L Turbo V8	MI	73	Crash
Ret	Hypercar	93	(France) Peugeot TotalEnergies	(United Kingdom) Paul di Resta (Denmark) Mikkel Jensen (France) Jean-Éric Vergne	Peugeot 9X8	MI	46	Retired
Ret	Hypercar	93	(France) Peugeot TotalEnergies	(United Kingdom) Paul di Resta (Denmark) Mikkel Jensen (France) Jean-Éric Vergne	Peugeot X6H 2.6 L Turbo V6	MI	46	Retired

Tyre manufacturers
Key
Symbol	Tyre manufacturer
**G**	Goodyear
**MI**	Michelin

== Standings after the race ==
2022 Hypercar World Endurance Drivers' Championship

Pos	+/-	Driver	Points
1		(Brazil) André Negrão (France) Matthieu Vaxivière (France) Nicolas Lapierre	106
2		(New Zealand) Brendon Hartley (Japan) Ryo Hirakawa (Switzerland) Sebastien Buemi	96
3		(Argentina) José María López (Japan) Kamui Kobayashi (United Kingdom) Mike Conway	76
4		(France) Olivier Pla (France) Romain Dumas	70
5		(Brazil) Pipo Derani	47

2022 Hypercar World Endurance Manufacturers' World Championship

Pos	+/-	Manufacturer	Points
1		(Japan) Toyota	121
2		(France) Alpine	106
3		(United States) Glickenhaus	70
4		(France) Peugeot	12

2022 World Endurance GTE Drivers' Championship

Pos	+/-	Driver	Points
1		(Italy) Alessandro Pier Guidi (United Kingdom) James Calado	95
2		(Italy) Gianmaria Bruni	94
3		(France) Kevin Estre (Denmark) Michael Christensen	93
4		(Austria) Richard Lietz	84
5		(Italy) Antonio Fuoco (Spain) Miguel Molina	75

2022 World Endurance GTE Manufacturers' Championship

Pos	+/-	Team	Points
1		(Germany) Porsche	187
2		(Italy) Ferrari	173
3		(United States) Chevrolet	65
