= Mikkel Jensen (racing driver) =

Danish racing driver (born 1994)

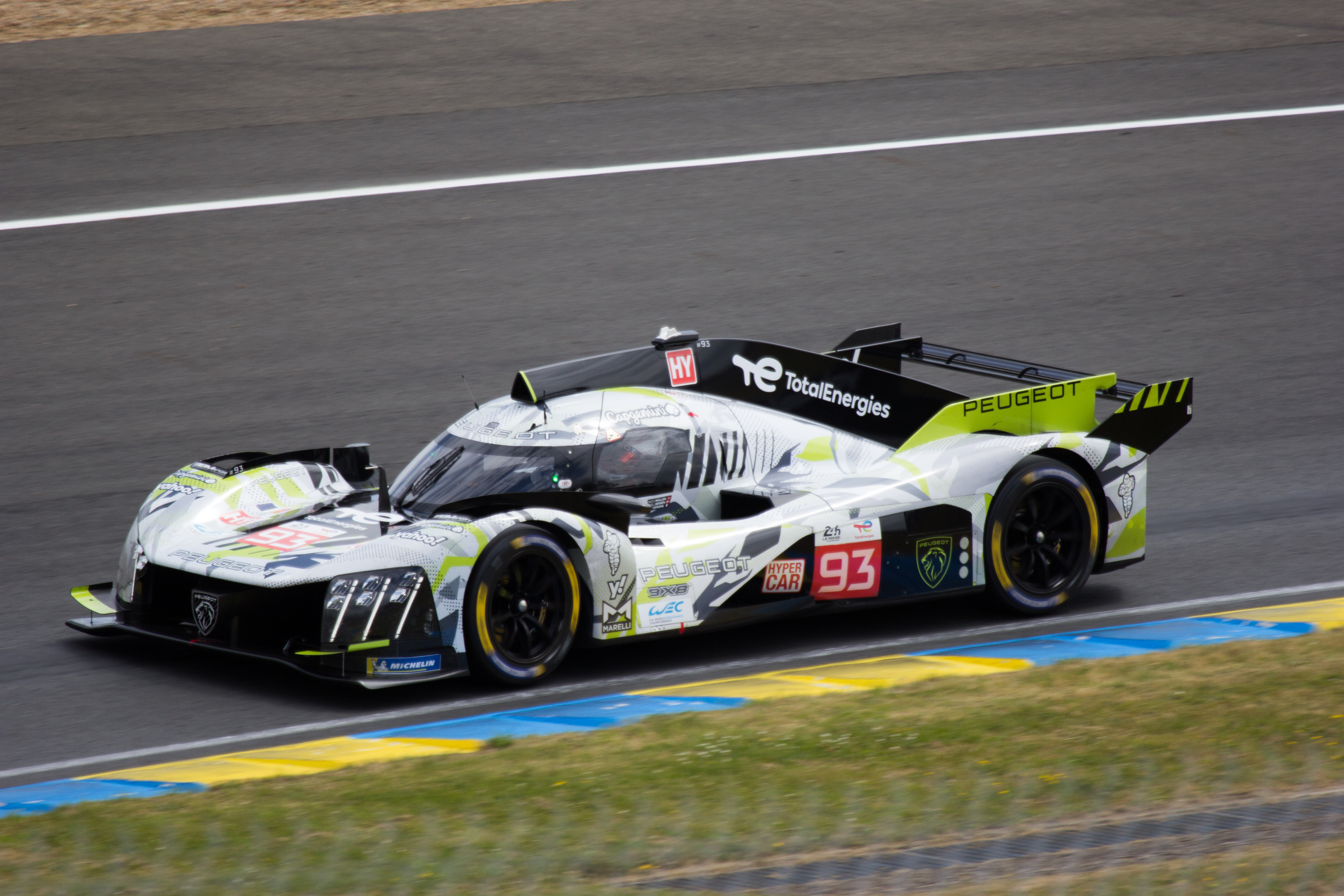
- Jensen at Le Mans in 2024
- Nationality: (Denmark) Danish
- Born: 31 December 1994 (age 31) Aarhus, Denmark

FIA World Endurance Championship career
- Debut season: 2022
- Current team: Peugeot TotalEnergies
- Categorisation: FIA Silver (until 2020); FIA Gold (2021–2022); FIA Platinum (2023–)
- Car number: 93
- Starts: 26
- Wins: 0
- Poles: 0
- Fastest laps: 0
- Best finish: 8th in 2023

Previous series
- 2018 2017, 2019 2016-22 2015-16 2013-14: ADAC GT Masters; Blancpain GT Series Endurance Cup; European Le Mans Series; FIA F3 European Championship; ADAC Formel Masters

Championship titles
- 2021 2021-22, 2024-25 2019 2014: IMSA - LMP2; Michelin Endurance Cup - LMP2 European Le Mans Series - LMP3; ADAC Formel Masters

Mikkel H. Jensen (born 31 December 1994) is a Danish racing driver. He is a McLaren Hypercar driver competing in the FIA World Endurance Championship, having previously been a factory driver for Peugeot and BMW.

== Early career ==
=== Karting ===
Jensen began karting in 2010 at the age of 15, having been gifted a kart by his father, and raced in his native Denmark for the next two years.

=== Single-seaters ===
Following a successful first test for the ADAC Formel Masters series, Jensen decided to pursue a career in racing. He made his debut in the series in 2013, driving with the Lotus-monikered Motopark Academy team. Jensen finished tenth in the championship with podiums at Spa and the Sachsenring. Jensen remained in the series in 2014, moving to the Neuhauser Racing team. He achieved ten wins at Oschersleben, Zandvoort, Spielberg, the Slovakia Ring, the Nürburgring and Hockenheim on his way to the championship title.

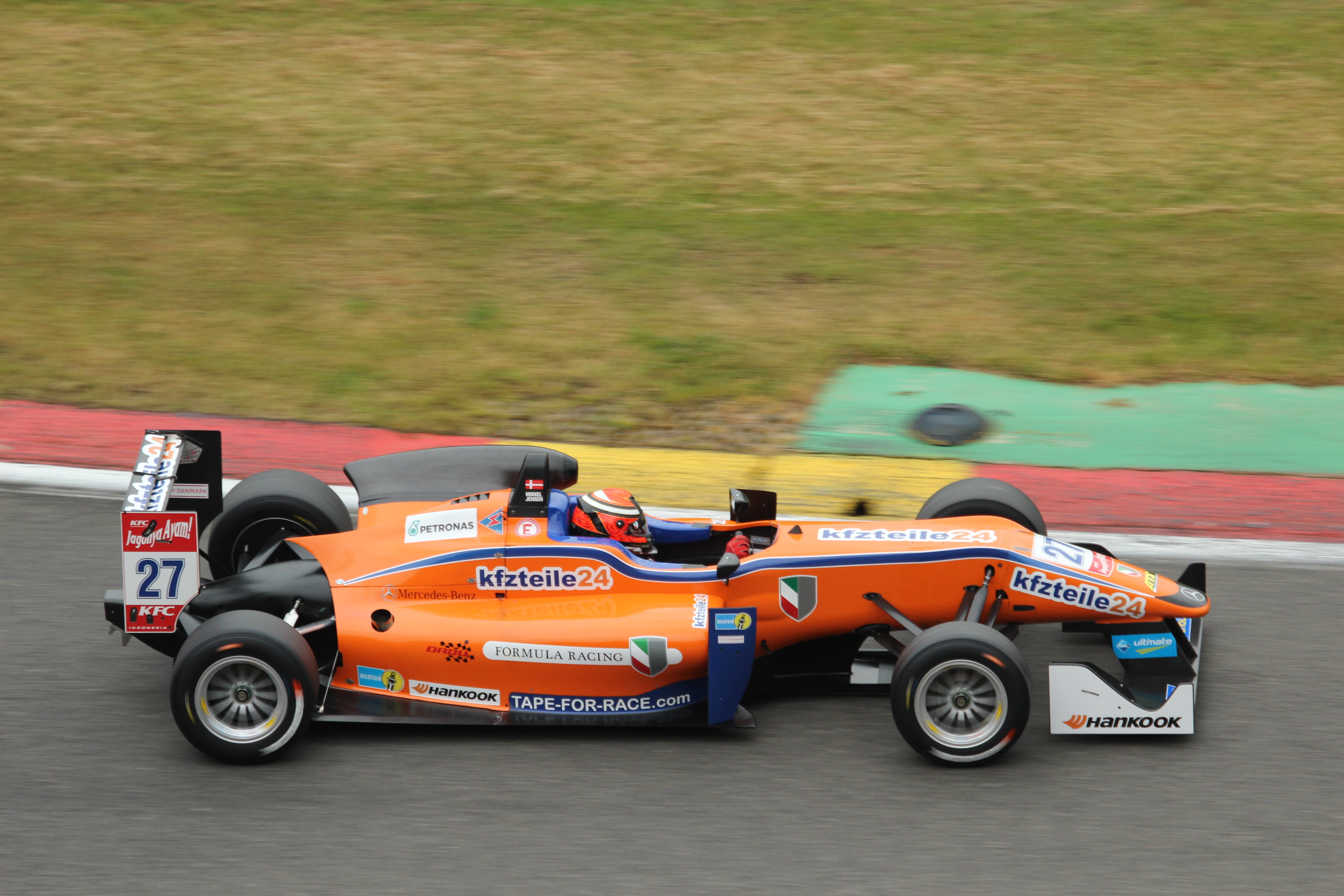
Jensen driving for Mücke at Spa-Francorchamps in Formula 3 in 2015.

In 2015, Jensen graduated to the FIA Formula 3 European Championship, joining Mücke Motorsport. With a pair of podiums at Monza being his best result, Jensen ended up tenth in the standings. He remained with Mücke for the 2016 season. Despite being in his second year, he could only take one podium finish on his way to twelfth overall.

== Sportscar career ==
2016 saw Jensen make his sportscar racing debut in the European Le Mans Series, as he joined Formula Racing for the round at Le Castellet. Piloting a Ferrari 458 Italia GT2, Jensen and teammates Mikkel Mac and Johnny Laursen finished second.

After exiting Formula 3, Jensen switched to the LMP3 category of the ELMS, driving alongside Alexander Talkanitsa Sr. and Jr. for AT Racing. The trio ended up sixth in the standings, with Jensen being a deciding factor in a lone victory at the Spa-Francorchamps Circuit and scoring three pole positions and fastest laps respectively across the season. Additionally, Jensen won the 6 Hours of Rome as part of the AF Corse outfit.

In 2018, BMW Team MTEK confirmed Jensen as their reserve driver for the 2018–19 World Endurance Championship campaign, a year after BMW signed to their junior programme. The Dane went on to compete with another BMW-affiliated squad, namely BMW Team Schnitzer, in the ADAC GT Masters with Timo Scheider. Three podiums earned the pair sixth place overall at year's end.

Ahead of the 2019 season, BMW promoted Jensen from junior driver to works driver, running him in all five races of the Intercontinental GT Challenge. Parallel to his GT commitments, he drove for Eurointernational in the ELMS's LMP3 category. Partnering Jens Petersen, Jensen would have a standout year, winning the championship after amassing three victories at Monza, Silverstone, and Spa, where Jensen overtook two drivers on the final lap. The title was decided in controversial fashion, as Jensen and Pedersen would inherit the championship following a penalty for Inter Europol, whose bronze-ranked driver had undercut their mandated driving time.

Going into 2020, Jensen progressed to the LMP2 category, driving in the ELMS for G-Drive Racing alongside Roman Rusinov and Nyck de Vries. The team scored three podiums including a win at the season finale, though the Dane put G-Drive out of the title picture when he crashed out of the lead late on at Spa, before a water leak at Monza gave the title to United Autosports. Thanks to the win at Portimão the outfit finished third in the standings. He also took part in two races of the IMSA SportsCar Championship, winning the Petit Le Mans event in class for Tower Motorsport By Starworks.

Jensen's Kessel Racing Ferrari at the 2022 24 Hours of Le Mans.

At the start of 2021, it was announced that Jensen would become part of the Peugeot Sport Le Mans Hypercar outfit for the 2022 WEC season. For his main campaign in 2021, Jensen drove in all seven races of the IMSA SCC together with bronze-ranked Ben Keating at PR1/Mathiasen Motorsports. The duo went on to control the championship despite a retirement at Daytona, as they won at Sebring, Watkins Glen, and Laguna Seca to win the LMP2 title. In 2022, the Dane would join Keating and Scott Huffaker for the IMSA endurance rounds, whilst also competing in the LMGTE class of the ELMS for Car Guy Racing by Kessel Racing. In the former, the trio scored two wins and took home the Michelin Endurance Cup title, whilst Jensen and teammate Frederik Schandorff narrowly missed out on the title at the final round, having gone on charge to pass Michelle Gatting for the victory at Spa. During the latter half of the year, Jensen completed the final three races of the WEC campaign together with Paul di Resta and Jean-Éric Vergne.

The following year, the trio of Jensen, di Resta and Vergne returned to the World Endurance Championship, driving the Peugeot 9X8. Though the year proved to be challenging, the trio managed to score the marque's first podium with the new car by finishing third at Monza, leading them to finish eighth in the drivers' standings. In addition to his WEC commitments, Jensen drove in IMSA for TDS Racing, finishing third in LMP2 together with Steven Thomas after winning two races.

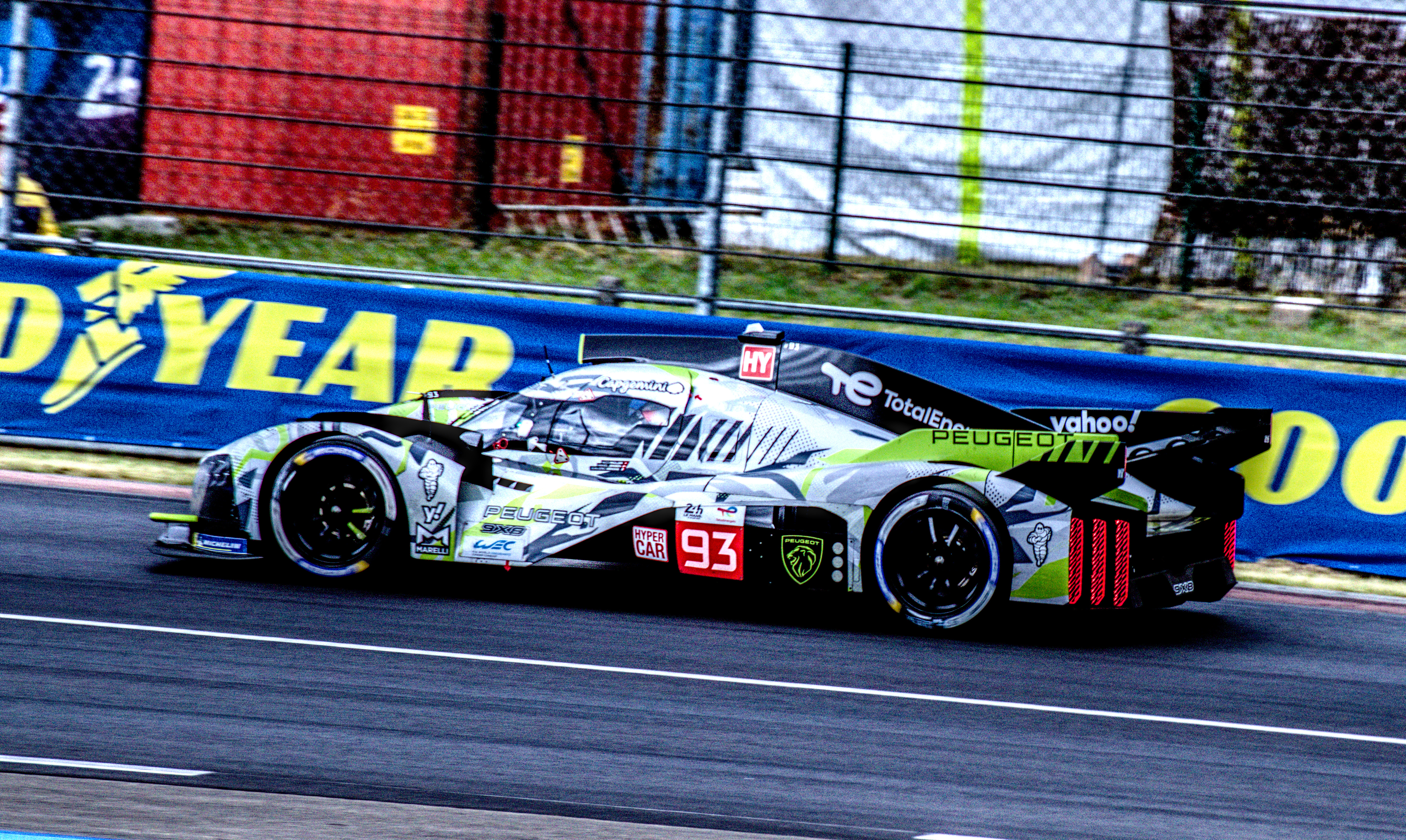
Jensen's No. 93 Peugeot at the 2023 24 Hours of Le Mans.

In 2024, Jensen remained in the World Endurance Championship with Peugeot, paired with Jean-Éric Vergne and Nico Müller. That season, Peugeot introduced a new package of the 9X8 ahead of the second round of the championship at Imola. Jensen and Müller finished the season in 12th in the drivers' standings with a best result of third, the first podium for the new model, at the season finale in Bahrain. Jensen continued in IMSA driving for TDS Racing, finishing tenth in the LMP2 standings following wins at Indianapolis and Road Atlanta. He also won the Michelin Endurance Cup in LMP2 alongside Steven Thomas and Hunter McElrea.

2025 would mark the final season in the World Endurance Championship for Jensen driving for Peugeot, as he announced his departure from the team and series following the final race in Bahrain. He finished the season in 12th once again with Paul di Resta, scoring the 9X8's best result of second and fourth overall podium at Fuji. This would also be the last year that Jensen would drive for TDS Racing in IMSA, as he was announced to be pairing Phil Fayer, Ben Hanley, and Hunter McElrea at United Autosports for the 2026 Rolex 24 in the LMP2 category. He finished the season in seventh, with back-to-back wins at Indianapolis and Road Atlanta again. He would go on to win the Michelin Endurance Cup beside Steven Thomas and Hunter McElrea for the second year in a row.

== Other racing ==
=== Formula E ===
In February 2025, Jensen took part in the Formula E rookie free practice at the Jeddah ePrix with Cupra Kiro, marking his first single-seater outing since 2016. He placed third and was said to have "greatly impressed" the team, which subsequently named him reserve driver.

== Racing record ==
=== Career summary ===
Season	Series	Team	Races	Wins	Poles	F/Laps	Podiums	Points	Position
2013	ADAC Formel Masters	Lotus	24	0	0	0	2	94	10th
2014	ADAC Formel Masters	Neuhauser Racing	24	10	8	12	17	377	**1st**
2015	FIA Formula 3 European Championship	Mücke Motorsport	32	0	1	0	2	115.5	10th
2015	Macau Grand Prix	Mücke Motorsport	1	0	0	0	0	N/A	19th
2016	FIA Formula 3 European Championship	kfzteile24 Mücke Motorsport	29	0	0	0	1	107	12th
2016	European Le Mans Series - LMGTE	Formula Racing	1	0	0	0	1	18	14th
2017	European Le Mans Series - LMP3	AT Racing	5	1	3	3	1	54	6th
2017	Blancpain GT Series Endurance Cup	Walkenhorst Motorsport	4	0	0	0	0	0	NC
2018	ADAC GT Masters	BMW Team Schnitzer	14	0	0	0	3	69	6th
2018	European Le Mans Series - LMP3	AT Racing	3	0	0	2	0	18	16th
2018	Le Mans Cup - LMP3	Eurointernational	2	1	1	0	1	20	15th
2018	International GT Open	Senkyr Motorsport	2	0	0	0	0	0	NC†
2019	European Le Mans Series - LMP3	Eurointernational	6	3	1	2	4	102	**1st**
2019	Blancpain GT Series Endurance Cup	Walkenhorst Motorsport	1	0	0	0	0	7	28th
2019	Intercontinental GT Challenge	Walkenhorst Motorsport	5	0	0	0	1	24	16th
2019	24 Hours of Nürburgring - SP9	Rowe Racing	1	0	0	0	0	N/A	DNF
2019–20	Asian Le Mans Series - GT	Car Guy Racing	1	0	0	0	1	18	14th
2020	European Le Mans Series - LMP2	G-Drive Racing	5	1	0	2	3	61	**3rd**
2020	IMSA SportsCar Championship - LMP2	Tower Motorsport by Starworks	2	1	0	1	2	67	6th
2020	24 Hours of Nürburgring - SP9	Walkenhorst Motorsport	1	0	0	0	0	N/A	12th
2021	IMSA SportsCar Championship - LMP2	PR1/Mathiasen Motorsports	7	3	5	4	6	2162	**1st**
2021	Asian Le Mans Series - GT	Car Guy Racing	4	1	0	0	1	31.5	6th
2021	European Le Mans Series - LMP2	G-Drive Racing	1	0	0	0	0	7	25th
2022	IMSA SportsCar Championship - LMP2	PR1/Mathiasen Motorsports	4	2	3	0	2	1050	11th
2022	Asian Le Mans Series - GT	Kessel Racing	2	0	0	0	0	2	14th
2022	24 Hours of Le Mans - LMGTE Am	Kessel Racing	1	0	0	0	0	N/A	12th
2022	European Le Mans Series - LMGTE	Car Guy Racing by Kessel Racing	6	1	1	2	3	78	**2nd**
2022	FIA World Endurance Championship - Hypercar	Peugeot TotalEnergies	3	0	0	0	0	12	10th
2023	FIA World Endurance Championship - Hypercar	Peugeot TotalEnergies	7	0	0	0	1	51	8th
2023	24 Hours of Le Mans - Hypercar	Peugeot TotalEnergies	1	0	0	0	0	N/A	8th
2023	IMSA SportsCar Championship - LMP2	TDS Racing	7	2	1	2	4	1942	**3rd**
2023	Asian Le Mans Series - GT	Car Guy Racing	4	0	0	0	0	1	19th
2024	FIA World Endurance Championship - Hypercar	Peugeot TotalEnergies	8	0	0	0	1	42	12th
2024	IMSA SportsCar Championship - LMP2	TDS Racing	6	2	0	3	3	1778	10th
2024–25	Formula E	Cupra Kiro	Reserve driver						
2025	FIA World Endurance Championship - Hypercar	Peugeot TotalEnergies	8	0	0	0	1	44	12th
2025	IMSA SportsCar Championship - LMP2	TDS Racing	6	2	1	2	4	1894	7th
2025–26	Asian Le Mans Series - LMP2	United Autosports	6	0	5	0	0	37	7th
2026	IMSA SportsCar Championship - LMP2	United Autosports USA	7	1	0	1	1	1835	8th
2026	24 Hours of Le Mans - LMP2	United Autosports	1	0	0	0	0	N/A	8th
2026–27	Asian Le Mans Series - LMP2	United Autosports							

^{†} As Jensen was a guest driver, he was ineligible for championship points. ^{*} Season still in progress.

=== Complete ADAC Formel Masters results ===
(key) (Races in bold indicate pole position) (Races in italics indicate fastest lap)

Year	Entrant	1	2	3	4	5	6	7	8	9	10	11	12	13	14	15	16	17	18	19	20	21	22	23	24	DC	Points
2013	Lotus	OSC; 1; 11	OSC; 2; 13	OSC; 3 Ret	SPA; 1; 9	SPA; 2; 7	SPA; 3; 2	SAC; 1; 11	SAC; 2; 3	SAC; 3; 8	NÜR; 1; 11	NÜR; 2; 7	NÜR; 3; 5	RBR; 1 Ret	RBR; 2; 4	RBR; 3 Ret	LAU; 1 Ret	LAU; 2; 6	LAU; 3; 6	SVK; 1; 8	SVK; 2; 10	SVK; 3; 18	HOC; 1; 9	HOC; 2; 6	HOC; 3; 6	10th	94
2014	Neuhauser Racing Team	**OSC**; **1**; 1	OSC; 2; 2	OSC; 3; 5	ZAN; 1; 1	ZAN; 2; 4	ZAN; 3; 4	LAU; 1; 3	LAU; 2; 3	LAU; 3 Ret	**RBR**; **1**; 1	**RBR**; **2**; 1	RBR; 3; 2	SVK; 1; 1	**SVK**; **2**; 2	SVK; 3 Ret	**NÜR**; **1**; 1	**NÜR**; **2**; 7	NÜR; 3; 1	**SAC**; **1**; 1	**SAC**; **2**; 1	SAC; 3; 4	HOC; 1; 3	HOC; 2; 1	HOC; 3; 3	1st	377

=== Complete FIA Formula 3 European Championship results ===
(key) (Races in bold indicate pole position) (Races in italics indicate fastest lap)

Year	Entrant	Engine	1	2	3	4	5	6	7	8	9	10	11	12	13	14	15	16	17	18	19	20	21	22	23	24	25	26	27	28	29	30	31	32	33	DC	Points
2015	kfzteile24 Mücke Motorsport	Mercedes	SIL; 1; 13	SIL; 2; 10	SIL; 3; 10	HOC; 1; 7	HOC; 2; 11	HOC; 3; 4	PAU; 1; 7	PAU; 2; 12	PAU; 3; 9	MNZ; 1; 2	MNZ; 2; 3	MNZ; 3 Ret	SPA; 1; 7	**SPA**; **2** Ret	SPA; 3 Ret	NOR; 1; 12	NOR; 2; 6	NOR; 3; 5	ZAN; 1; 8	ZAN; 2; 18	ZAN; 3 Ret	RBR; 1; 10	RBR; 2; 9	RBR; 3; 13	ALG; 1; 8	ALG; 2; 9	ALG; 3 DNS	NÜR; 1; 5	NÜR; 2; 10	NÜR; 3 Ret	HOC; 1; 19	HOC; 2; 5	HOC; 3; 8	9th	117.5
2016	kfzteile24 Mücke Motorsport	Mercedes	LEC; 1; 13	LEC; 2; 4	LEC; 3; 4	HUN; 1; 10	HUN; 2; 7	HUN; 3; 11	PAU; 1; 6	PAU; 2; 8	PAU; 3; 5	RBR; 1; 4	RBR; 2; 5	RBR; 3 Ret	NOR; 1; 7	NOR; 2; 8	NOR; 3 Ret	ZAN; 1; 15	ZAN; 2; 13	ZAN; 3; 12	SPA; 1 Ret	SPA; 2; 3	SPA; 3; 9	NÜR; 1; 15	NÜR; 2; 13	NÜR; 3; 17	IMO; 1; 11	IMO; 2; 10	IMO; 3; 7	HOC; 1 Ret	HOC; 2; 15	HOC; 3 DNS				12th	107

=== Complete European Le Mans Series results ===
(key) (Races in bold indicate pole position; results in italics indicate fastest lap)

Year	Entrant	Class	Chassis	Engine	1	2	3	4	5	6	Rank	Points
2016	Formula Racing	LMGTE	Ferrari 458 Italia GT2	Ferrari 4.5 L V8	SIL	IMO	RBR	LEC; 2	SPA	EST	14th	18
2017	AT Racing	LMP3	Ligier JS P3	Nissan VK50VE 5.0 L V8	**SIL**; 4	MNZ	RBR; 6	LEC; Ret	**SPA**; 1	**ALG**; 7	6th	54
2018	AT Racing	LMP3	Ligier JS P3	Nissan VK50VE 5.0 L V8	LEC	MNZ; Ret	RBR; 5	SIL	SPA	ALG; 6	16th	18
2019	Eurointernational	LMP3	Ligier JS P3	Nissan VK50VE 5.0 L V8	LEC; 2	MNZ; 1	**CAT**; Ret	SIL; 1	SPA; 1	ALG; 6	1st	102
2020	G-Drive Racing	LMP2	Aurus 01	Gibson GK428 4.2 L V8	LEC; 2	SPA; Ret	LEC; 2	MNZ; Ret	ALG; 1		3rd	61
2021	G-Drive Racing	LMP2	Aurus 01	Gibson GK428 4.2 L V8	CAT	RBR	LEC	MNZ; 8	SPA	ALG	25th	7
2022	Car Guy Racing by Kessel Racing	LMGTE	Ferrari 488 GTE Evo	Ferrari F154CB 3.9 L Turbo V8	LEC; 5	IMO; DSQ	MNZ; 3	CAT; 4	**SPA**; 1	ALG; 3	2nd	78

=== Complete 24 Hours of Le Mans results ===
Year	Team	Co-Drivers	Car	Class	Laps	Pos.	Class Pos.
2020	(Russia) G-Drive Racing	(Russia) Roman Rusinov (France) Jean-Éric Vergne	Aurus 01-Gibson	LMP2	367	9th	5th
2021	(Switzerland) Kessel Racing	(Australia) Scott Andrews (Japan) Takeshi Kimura	Ferrari 488 GTE Evo	GTE; Am	128	DNF	DNF
2022	(Switzerland) Kessel Racing	(Japan) Takeshi Kimura (Denmark) Frederik Schandorff	Ferrari 488 GTE Evo	GTE; Am	336	45th	12th
2023	(France) Peugeot TotalEnergies	(United Kingdom) Paul di Resta (France) Jean-Éric Vergne	Peugeot 9X8	Hypercar	330	8th	8th
2024	(France) Peugeot TotalEnergies	(Switzerland) Nico Müller (France) Jean-Éric Vergne	Peugeot 9X8	Hypercar	309	12th	12th
2025	(France) Peugeot TotalEnergies	(United Kingdom) Paul di Resta (France) Jean-Éric Vergne	Peugeot 9X8	Hypercar	379	16th	16th
2026	(United Kingdom) United Autosports	(Sweden) Rasmus Lindh (Switzerland) Grégoire Saucy	Oreca 07-Gibson	LMP2	358	22nd	8th

=== Complete Asian Le Mans Series results ===
(key) (Races in bold indicate pole position; results in italics indicate fastest lap)

Year	Team	Car	Engine	Class	1	2	3	4	5	6	Pos.	Points
2019–20	Car Guy Racing	GT	Ferrari 488 GT3	Ferrari F154CB 3.9 L Turbo V8	SEP	BEN	SEP	CHA; 2			14th	18
2021	Car Guy Racing	GT	Ferrari 488 GT3 Evo 2020	Ferrari F154CB 3.9 L Turbo V8	DUB; 1; 9	DUB; 2; 8	ABU; 1; 13	ABU; 2; 1			6th	31.5
2022	Kessel Racing	GT	Ferrari 488 GT3 Evo 2020	Ferrari F154CB 3.9 L Turbo V8	DUB; 1 DNS	DUB; 2 DNS	ABU; 1; 10	ABU; 2; 10			14th	2
2023	Car Guy Racing	GT	Ferrari 488 GT3 Evo 2020	Ferrari F154CB 3.9 L Turbo V8	DUB; 1; 14	DUB; 2 Ret	ABU; 1; 10	ABU; 2; 14			19th	1
2025–26	United Autosports	LMP2	Oreca 07	Gibson GK428 4.2 L V8	**SEP**; **1**; 5	SEP; 2; 6	**DUB**; **1**; 6	**DUB**; **2** Ret	**ABU**; **1** Ret	**ABU**; **2**; 7	7th	37

=== Complete IMSA SportsCar Championship results ===
(key) (Races in bold indicate pole position; results in italics indicate fastest lap)

Year	Team	Class	Make	Engine	1	2	3	4	5	6	7	Pos.	Points
2020	Tower Motorsport by Starworks	LMP2	Oreca 07	Gibson GK428 4.2 L V8	DAY	SEB	ELK	ATL	PET; 1	LGA	SEB; 2	6th	67
2021	PR1/Mathiasen Motorsports	LMP2	Oreca 07	Gibson GK428 4.2 L V8	**DAY**; 7†	SEB; 1	WGL; 2	**WGL**; 1	**ELK**; 3	**LGA**; 1	**PET**; 2	1st	2162
2022	PR1/Mathiasen Motorsports	LMP2	Oreca 07	Gibson GK428 4.2 L V8	**DAY**; 4†	**SEB**; 1	LGA	MDO	**WGL**; 1	ELK	PET; 6	11th	1050
2023	TDS Racing	LMP2	Oreca 07	Gibson GK428 4.2 L V8	DAY; 10†	SEB; 2	LGA; 1	**WGL**; 7	ELK; 3	IMS; 1	PET; 8	3rd	1942
2024	TDS Racing	LMP2	Oreca 07	Gibson GK428 4.2 L V8	DAY; 13	SEB; 2	WGL; 9	MOS	ELK; 12	IMS; 1	PET; 1	10th	1778
2025	TDS Racing	LMP2	Oreca 07	Gibson GK428 4.2 L V8	DAY; 8	**SEB**; 3	WGL; 11	MOS	ELK; 3	IMS; 1	PET; 1	7th	1894
2026	United Autosports USA	LMP2	Oreca 07	Gibson GK428 4.2 L V8	DAY; 10	SEB; 1	WGL; 9	MOS; 7	ELK; 9	IMS; 10	PET; 9	8th	1835

^{†} Points only counted towards the Michelin Endurance Cup, and not the overall LMP2 Championship.

=== Complete FIA World Endurance Championship results ===
Year	Entrant	Class	Car	Engine	1	2	3	4	5	6	7	8	Rank	Points
2022	Peugeot TotalEnergies	Hypercar	Peugeot 9X8	Peugeot X6H 2.6 L Turbo V6	SEB	SPA	LMS	MNZ; Ret	FUJ; 4	BHR; Ret			10th	12
2023	Peugeot TotalEnergies	Hypercar	Peugeot 9X8	Peugeot X6H 2.6 L Turbo V6	SEB; 9	ALG; 7	SPA; 8	LMS; 6	MNZ; 3	FUJ; 8	BHR; 9		8th	51
2024	Peugeot TotalEnergies	Hypercar	Peugeot 9X8	Peugeot X6H 2.6 L Turbo V6	QAT; DSQ	IMO; 9	SPA; 10	LMS; 12	SÃO; 8	COA; 12	FUJ; 4	BHR; 3	12th	42
2025	Peugeot TotalEnergies	Hypercar	Peugeot 9X8	Peugeot X6H 2.6 L Turbo V6	QAT; 9	IMO; 9	SPA; 11	LMS; 15	SÃO; 7	COA; 4	FUJ; 2	BHR; 9	12th	44

Sporting positions
Preceded by Alessio Picariello	ADAC Formel Masters; Champion; 2014	Succeeded by None (Series ended)
Preceded by John Farano; Rob Garofall; Job van Uitert	European Le Mans Series; LMP3 Champion; 2019; With: Jens Petersen	Succeeded by Wayne Boyd; Tom Gamble; Robert Wheldon
Preceded by Patrick Kelly	IMSA SportsCar Championship; LMP2 Champion; 2021; With: Ben Keating	Succeeded by John Farano
Preceded by Simon Trummer	Michelin Endurance Cup; LMP2 Champion; 2021-2022; With: Ben Keating & Scott Huffaker	Succeeded by Ben Hanley; George Kurtz
Preceded by Ben Hanley; George Kurtz	Michelin Endurance Cup; LMP2 Champion; 2024-2025; With: Hunter McElrea & Steven Thomas	Succeeded by Toby Sowery; George Kurtz; Alex Quinn
