= 2024 6 Hours of Fuji =

Sports car endurance race

(Japan) 2024 6 Hours of Fuji
Event information
- Round 7 of 8 in the 2024 FIA World Endurance Championship
- Date: 15 September 2024
- Location: Oyama, Shizuoka
- Venue: Fuji Speedway
- Duration: 6 Hours

Results
- Laps completed: 213
- Distance (km): 971.612
- Distance (miles): 603.732
- Hypercar

Pole position
- Time: 1:28.901
- Team: (United States) Cadillac Racing

Winners
- Team: (Germany) Porsche Penske Motorsport
- Drivers: (France) Kévin Estre (Germany) André Lotterer (Belgium) Laurens Vanthoor
- LMGT3

Winners
- Team: (Italy) Vista AF Corse
- Drivers: (Italy) Francesco Castellacci (Switzerland) Thomas Flohr (Italy) Davide Rigon

The 2024 6 Hours of Fuji was an endurance sportscar racing event held on 15 September 2024, as the seventh of eight rounds of the 2024 FIA World Endurance Championship. It was the eleventh running of the event in its current format in the World Endurance Championship.

== Background ==
The event was announced on 9 June 2023, during the 2023 24 Hours of Le Mans weekend, with the race being held in every WEC season, except the 2020 and 2021 seasons due to the COVID-19 pandemic in Japan.

== Entry list ==
36 cars entered the race: 18 in Hypercar and 18 in LMGT3. The only changes from the Lone Star Le Mans entry list are Jules Gounon replacing Paul-Loup Chatin in the No. 35 Alpine, and Christian Ried replacing Ben Keating in the No. 88 Ford.

== Schedule ==
Date	Time (local: JST)	Event
Friday, 13 September	11:00	Free Practice 1
Friday, 13 September	15:30	Free Practice 2
Saturday, 14 September	10:20	Free Practice 3
Saturday, 14 September	14:20	Qualifying - LMGT3
Saturday, 14 September	14:40	Hyperpole - LMGT3
Saturday, 14 September	15:00	Qualifying - Hypercar
Saturday, 14 September	15:20	Hyperpole - Hypercar
Sunday, 15 September	11:00	Race

== Practice ==
Three practice session were held: two were held on Friday, and one was held on Saturday. The sessions on Friday morning and Friday afternoon lasted 90 minutes, and the session on Saturday morning lasted 40 minutes, after being scheduled to last 60 minutes.

=== Practice 1 ===
The first practice session started at 11:00 JST on Friday. Laurens Vanthoor topped the sheets with a lap time of 1 minute, 30.561 seconds in his No. 6 Porsche Penske Motorsport Porsche, 0.010 seconds quicker than second-placed Ryō Hirakawa in the No. 8 Toyota Gazoo Racing Toyota. Antonio Fuoco rounded out the top three in the No. 50 Ferrari AF Corse Ferrari, 0.543 seconds behind Vanthoor. Marino Sato was quickest in his No. 95 United Autosports McLaren in LMGT3, with a lap time of 1:40.528. Alessio Rovera set an identical fastest lap time in the No. 55 Vista AF Corse Ferrari, with Davide Rigon in the sister No. 54 Ferrari 0.265 seconds behind both Sato and Rovera. The session saw one red flag: the No. 95 McLaren stopped at turn 10 after contact with the No. 2 Cadillac Racing Cadillac.

Class	No.	Entrant	Driver	Time
Hypercar	6	(Germany) Porsche Penske Motorsport	(Belgium) Laurens Vanthoor	1:30.561
LMGT3	95	(United Kingdom) United Autosports	(Japan) Marino Sato	1:40.528

- Note: Only the fastest car in each class is shown.

=== Practice 2 ===
The second practice session started at 15:30 JST on Friday, with Dries Vanthoor quickest in the No. 15 BMW M Team WRT BMW: he set a lap of 1 minute, 29.577 seconds. Vanthoor's lap was 0.009 seconds quicker than that of Matt Campbell in the No. 5 Porsche, with Alex Lynn claiming third place in the No. 2 Cadillac. LMGT3 was topped by Rovera in the No. 55 Ferrari, with a lap time of 1:40.682. Hiroshi Koizumi was second in the No. 82 TF Sport Corvette, 0.169 seconds slower. The top three was rounded out by Franck Perera in the No. 60 Iron Lynx Lamborghini.

Class	No.	Entrant	Driver	Time
Hypercar	15	(Belgium) BMW M Team WRT	(Belgium) Dries Vanthoor	1:29.577
LMGT3	55	(Italy) Vista AF Corse	(Italy) Alessio Rovera	1:40.682

- Note: Only the fastest car in each class is shown.

=== Final practice ===
The third and final practice session started at 10:20 JST on Saturday. Hirakawa topped the timing sheets in the No. 8 Toyota with a lap time of 1:29.621. Lynn was second in the No. 2 Cadillac, 0.086 seconds slower, with Fuoco rounding out the top three in the No. 50 Ferrari. François Heriau topped the LMGT3 cars in the No. 55 Ferrari, with a lap of 1 minute, 41.206 seconds. Rigon was in second in the sister Ferrari, 0.107 seconds slower, with Arnold Robin rounding out the top three. The session was red-flagged after 40 minutes due to curbing issues in turn 1.

Class	No.	Entrant	Driver	Time
Hypercar	8	(Japan) Toyota Gazoo Racing	(Japan) Ryō Hirakawa	1:29.577
LMGT3	55	(Italy) Vista AF Corse	(France) François Heriau	1:40.682

- Note: Only the fastest car in each class is shown.

== Qualifying ==
=== Qualifying results ===
Pole position winners in each class are marked in bold.

Pos	Class	No.	Entrant	Qualifying	Hyperpole	Grid
1	**Hypercar**	**2**	**(United States) Cadillac Racing**	**1:29.090**	**1:28.901**	1
2	Hypercar	8	(Japan) Toyota Gazoo Racing	1:29.513	1:28.942	2
3	Hypercar	15	(Belgium) BMW M Team WRT	1:29.505	1:29.059	3
4	Hypercar	7	(Japan) Toyota Gazoo Racing	1:29.423	1:29.065	4
5	Hypercar	6	(Germany) Porsche Penske Motorsport	1:29.256	1:29.152	5
6	Hypercar	35	(France) Alpine Endurance Team	1:29.402	1:29.154	6
7	Hypercar	50	(Italy) Ferrari AF Corse	1:29.510	1:29.196	7
8	Hypercar	5	(Germany) Porsche Penske Motorsport	1:29.591	1:29.223	8
9	Hypercar	63	(Italy) Lamborghini Iron Lynx	1:29.721	1:29.582	9
10	Hypercar	99	(Germany) Proton Competition	1:29.399	1:29.589	10
11	Hypercar	20	(Belgium) BMW M Team WRT	1:29.724		11
12	Hypercar	51	(Italy) Ferrari AF Corse	1:29.772		12
13	Hypercar	83	(Italy) AF Corse	1:29.829		13
14	Hypercar	93	(France) Peugeot TotalEnergies	1:29.883		14
15	Hypercar	36	(France) Alpine Endurance Team	1:30.028		15
16	Hypercar	12	(United Kingdom) Hertz Team Jota	1:30.072		16
17	Hypercar	38	(United Kingdom) Hertz Team Jota	1:30.092		17
18	Hypercar	94	(France) Peugeot TotalEnergies	1:30.157		18
19	**LMGT3**	**55**	**(Italy) Vista AF Corse**	**1:40.932**	**1:40.893**	19
20	LMGT3	81	(United Kingdom) TF Sport	1:41.110	1:40.975	20
21	LMGT3	95	(United Kingdom) United Autosports	1:41.332	1:41.120	21
22	LMGT3	85	(Italy) Iron Dames	1:41.189	1:41.265	22
23	LMGT3	59	(United Kingdom) United Autosports	1:41.619	1:41.293	23
24	LMGT3	78	(France) Akkodis ASP Team	1:41.527	1:41.308	24
25	LMGT3	82	(United Kingdom) TF Sport	1:41.267	1:41.310	25
26	LMGT3	27	(United States) Heart of Racing Team	1:41.426	1:41.397	26
27	LMGT3	54	(Italy) Vista AF Corse	1:41.483	1:41.608	27
28	LMGT3	77	(Germany) Proton Competition	1:41.440	1:41.719	28
29	LMGT3	87	(France) Akkodis ASP Team	1:41.850		29
30	LMGT3	46	(Belgium) Team WRT	1:41.866		30
31	LMGT3	777	(Japan) D'station Racing	1:41.908		31
32	LMGT3	92	(Lithuania) Manthey PureRxcing	1:41.935		32
33	LMGT3	91	(Germany) Manthey EMA	1:41.999		33
34	LMGT3	31	(Belgium) Team WRT	1:42.013		34
35	LMGT3	88	(Germany) Proton Competition	1:42.502		35
36	LMGT3	60	(Italy) Iron Lynx	1:43.417		36

== Race ==
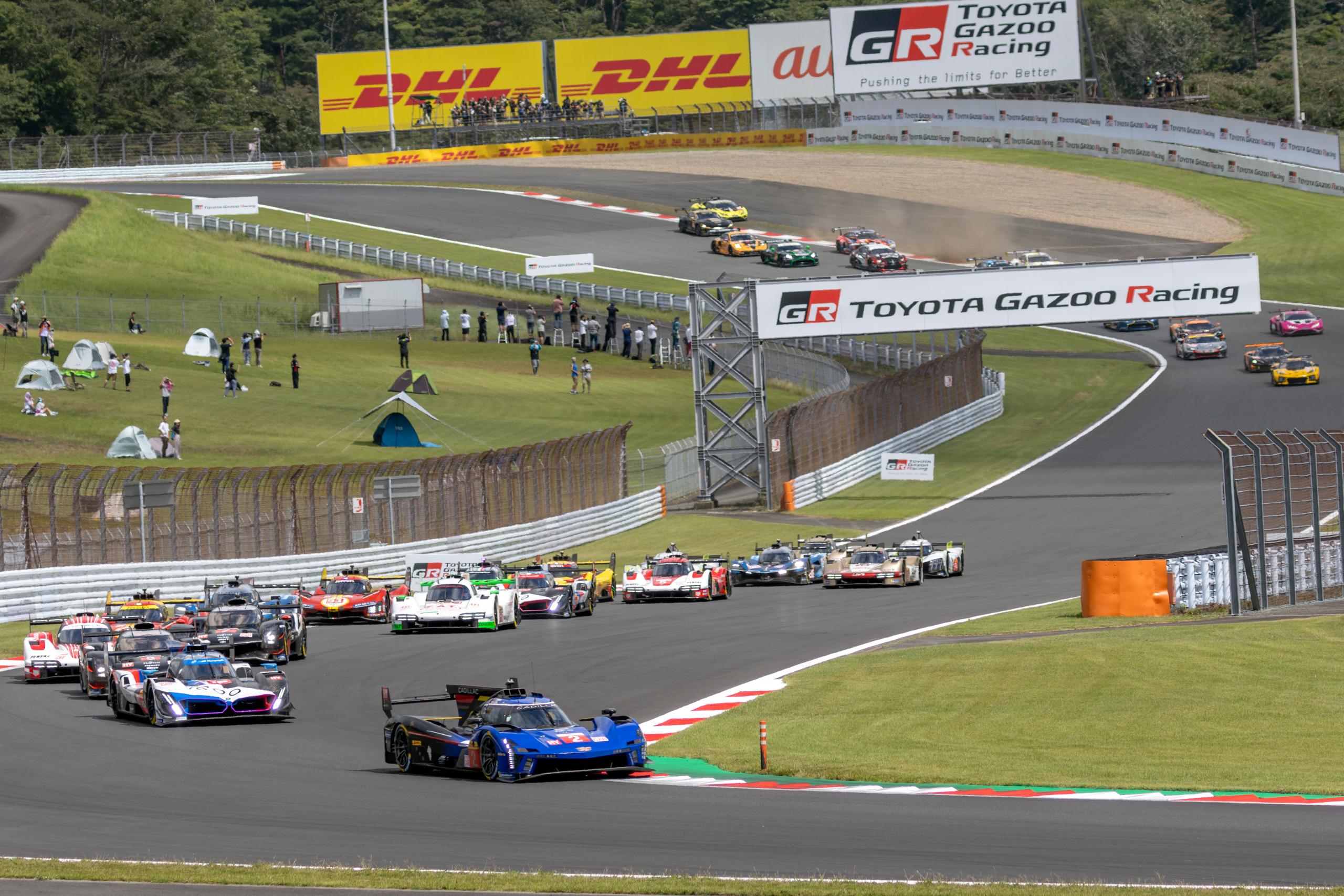
The opening lap of the race

=== Race results ===
The minimum number of laps for classification (70% of overall winning car's distance) was 149 laps. Class winners are in bold and ‡.

Pos	Class	No	Team	Drivers	Chassis	Tyre	Laps	Time/Retired
Pos	Class	No	Team	Drivers	Engine	Tyre	Laps	Time/Retired
1	**Hypercar**	**6**	**(Germany) Porsche Penske Motorsport**	**(France) Kévin Estre (Germany) André Lotterer (Belgium) Laurens Vanthoor**	**Porsche 963**	M	**213**	**6:00:32.196‡**
1	**Hypercar**	**6**	**(Germany) Porsche Penske Motorsport**	**(France) Kévin Estre (Germany) André Lotterer (Belgium) Laurens Vanthoor**	**Porsche 9RD 4.6 L Turbo V8**	M	**213**	**6:00:32.196‡**
2	Hypercar	15	(Belgium) BMW M Team WRT	(Switzerland) Raffaele Marciello (Belgium) Dries Vanthoor (Germany) Marco Wittmann	BMW M Hybrid V8	M	213	+16.601
2	Hypercar	15	(Belgium) BMW M Team WRT	(Switzerland) Raffaele Marciello (Belgium) Dries Vanthoor (Germany) Marco Wittmann	BMW P66/3 4.0 L Turbo V8	M	213	+16.601
3	Hypercar	36	(France) Alpine Endurance Team	(France) Nicolas Lapierre (Germany) Mick Schumacher (France) Matthieu Vaxivière	Alpine A424	M	213	+42.321
3	Hypercar	36	(France) Alpine Endurance Team	(France) Nicolas Lapierre (Germany) Mick Schumacher (France) Matthieu Vaxivière	Alpine V634 3.4 L Turbo V6	M	213	+42.321
4	Hypercar	93	(France) Peugeot TotalEnergies	(Denmark) Mikkel Jensen (Switzerland) Nico Müller (France) Jean-Éric Vergne	Peugeot 9X8	M	213	+45.846
4	Hypercar	93	(France) Peugeot TotalEnergies	(Denmark) Mikkel Jensen (Switzerland) Nico Müller (France) Jean-Éric Vergne	Peugeot X6H 2.6 L Turbo V6	M	213	+45.846
5	Hypercar	12	(United Kingdom) Hertz Team Jota	(United Kingdom) Callum Ilott (France) Norman Nato (United Kingdom) Will Stevens	Porsche 963	M	213	+49.689
5	Hypercar	12	(United Kingdom) Hertz Team Jota	(United Kingdom) Callum Ilott (France) Norman Nato (United Kingdom) Will Stevens	Porsche 9RD 4.6 L Turbo V8	M	213	+49.689
6	Hypercar	38	(United Kingdom) Hertz Team Jota	(United Kingdom) Jenson Button (United Kingdom) Phil Hanson (Denmark) Oliver Rasmussen	Porsche 963	M	213	+51.916
6	Hypercar	38	(United Kingdom) Hertz Team Jota	(United Kingdom) Jenson Button (United Kingdom) Phil Hanson (Denmark) Oliver Rasmussen	Porsche 9RD 4.6 L Turbo V8	M	213	+51.916
7	Hypercar	35	(France) Alpine Endurance Team	(France) Jules Gounon (Austria) Ferdinand Habsburg (France) Charles Milesi	Alpine A424	M	213	+54.316
7	Hypercar	35	(France) Alpine Endurance Team	(France) Jules Gounon (Austria) Ferdinand Habsburg (France) Charles Milesi	Alpine V634 3.4 L Turbo V6	M	213	+54.316
8	Hypercar	94	(France) Peugeot TotalEnergies	(United Kingdom) Paul di Resta (France) Loïc Duval (Belgium) Stoffel Vandoorne	Peugeot 9X8	M	213	+54.324
8	Hypercar	94	(France) Peugeot TotalEnergies	(United Kingdom) Paul di Resta (France) Loïc Duval (Belgium) Stoffel Vandoorne	Peugeot X6H 2.6 L Turbo V6	M	213	+54.324
9	Hypercar	50	(Italy) Ferrari AF Corse	(Italy) Antonio Fuoco (Spain) Miguel Molina (Denmark) Nicklas Nielsen	Ferrari 499P	M	213	+57.874
9	Hypercar	50	(Italy) Ferrari AF Corse	(Italy) Antonio Fuoco (Spain) Miguel Molina (Denmark) Nicklas Nielsen	Ferrari F163 3.0 L Turbo V6	M	213	+57.874
10	Hypercar	8	(Japan) Toyota Gazoo Racing	(Switzerland) Sébastien Buemi (New Zealand) Brendon Hartley (Japan) Ryo Hirakawa	Toyota GR010 Hybrid	M	213	+58.879
10	Hypercar	8	(Japan) Toyota Gazoo Racing	(Switzerland) Sébastien Buemi (New Zealand) Brendon Hartley (Japan) Ryo Hirakawa	Toyota H8909 3.5 L Turbo V6	M	213	+58.879
11	Hypercar	99	(Germany) Proton Competition	(France) Julien Andlauer (Switzerland) Neel Jani (United Kingdom) Harry Tincknell	Porsche 963	M	212	+1 Lap
11	Hypercar	99	(Germany) Proton Competition	(France) Julien Andlauer (Switzerland) Neel Jani (United Kingdom) Harry Tincknell	Porsche 9RD 4.6 L Turbo V8	M	212	+1 Lap
12	Hypercar	83	(Italy) AF Corse	(Poland) Robert Kubica (Israel) Robert Shwartzman (China) Yifei Ye	Ferrari 499P	M	211	+2 Laps
12	Hypercar	83	(Italy) AF Corse	(Poland) Robert Kubica (Israel) Robert Shwartzman (China) Yifei Ye	Ferrari F163 3.0 L Turbo V6	M	211	+2 Laps
13	**LMGT3**	**54**	**(Italy) Vista AF Corse**	**(Italy) Francesco Castellacci (Switzerland) Thomas Flohr (Italy) Davide Rigon**	**Ferrari 296 GT3**	G	**194**	**+19 Laps‡**
13	**LMGT3**	**54**	**(Italy) Vista AF Corse**	**(Italy) Francesco Castellacci (Switzerland) Thomas Flohr (Italy) Davide Rigon**	**Ferrari F163CE 3.0 L Turbo V6**	G	**194**	**+19 Laps‡**
14	LMGT3	92	(Lithuania) Manthey PureRxcing	(Austria) Klaus Bachler (Saint Kitts and Nevis) Alex Malykhin (Germany) Joel Sturm	Porsche 911 GT3 R (992)	G	194	+19 Laps
14	LMGT3	92	(Lithuania) Manthey PureRxcing	(Austria) Klaus Bachler (Saint Kitts and Nevis) Alex Malykhin (Germany) Joel Sturm	Porsche M97/80 4.2 L Flat-6	G	194	+19 Laps
15	LMGT3	46	(Belgium) Team WRT	(Oman) Ahmad Al Harthy (Belgium) Maxime Martin (Italy) Valentino Rossi	BMW M4 GT3	G	194	+19 Laps
15	LMGT3	46	(Belgium) Team WRT	(Oman) Ahmad Al Harthy (Belgium) Maxime Martin (Italy) Valentino Rossi	BMW P58 3.0 L Turbo I6	G	194	+19 Laps
16	LMGT3	81	(United Kingdom) TF Sport	(Angola) Rui Andrade (Republic of Ireland) Charlie Eastwood (Belgium) Tom van Rompuy	Chevrolet Corvette Z06 GT3.R	G	194	+19 Laps
16	LMGT3	81	(United Kingdom) TF Sport	(Angola) Rui Andrade (Republic of Ireland) Charlie Eastwood (Belgium) Tom van Rompuy	Chevrolet LT6.R 5.5 L V8	G	194	+19 Laps
17	LMGT3	85	(Italy) Iron Dames	(Belgium) Sarah Bovy (Switzerland) Rahel Frey (Denmark) Michelle Gatting	Lamborghini Huracán GT3 Evo 2	G	194	+19 Laps
17	LMGT3	85	(Italy) Iron Dames	(Belgium) Sarah Bovy (Switzerland) Rahel Frey (Denmark) Michelle Gatting	Lamborghini DGF 5.2 L V10	G	194	+19 Laps
18	LMGT3	55	(Italy) Vista AF Corse	(France) François Hériau (United States) Simon Mann (Italy) Alessio Rovera	Ferrari 296 GT3	G	194	+19 Laps
18	LMGT3	55	(Italy) Vista AF Corse	(France) François Hériau (United States) Simon Mann (Italy) Alessio Rovera	Ferrari F163CE 3.0 L Turbo V6	G	194	+19 Laps
19	LMGT3	777	(Japan) D'station Racing	(France) Erwan Bastard (France) Clément Mateu (Denmark) Marco Sørensen	Aston Martin Vantage AMR GT3 Evo	G	194	+19 Laps
19	LMGT3	777	(Japan) D'station Racing	(France) Erwan Bastard (France) Clément Mateu (Denmark) Marco Sørensen	Aston Martin M177 4.0 L Turbo V8	G	194	+19 Laps
20	LMGT3	59	(United Kingdom) United Autosports	(Brazil) Nicolas Costa (United Kingdom) James Cottingham (Switzerland) Grégoire Saucy	McLaren 720S GT3 Evo	G	194	+19 Laps
20	LMGT3	59	(United Kingdom) United Autosports	(Brazil) Nicolas Costa (United Kingdom) James Cottingham (Switzerland) Grégoire Saucy	McLaren M840T 4.0 L Turbo V8	G	194	+19 Laps
21	LMGT3	27	(United States) Heart of Racing Team	(United Kingdom) Ian James (Italy) Daniel Mancinelli (Spain) Alex Riberas	Aston Martin Vantage AMR GT3 Evo	G	194	+19 Laps
21	LMGT3	27	(United States) Heart of Racing Team	(United Kingdom) Ian James (Italy) Daniel Mancinelli (Spain) Alex Riberas	Aston Martin M177 4.0 L Turbo V8	G	194	+19 Laps
22	LMGT3	31	(Belgium) Team WRT	(Brazil) Augusto Farfus (Indonesia) Sean Gelael (United Kingdom) Darren Leung	BMW M4 GT3	G	194	+19 Laps
22	LMGT3	31	(Belgium) Team WRT	(Brazil) Augusto Farfus (Indonesia) Sean Gelael (United Kingdom) Darren Leung	BMW P58 3.0 L Turbo I6	G	194	+19 Laps
23	LMGT3	78	(France) Akkodis ASP Team	(South Africa) Kelvin van der Linde (France) Arnold Robin (Austria) Clemens Schmid	Lexus RC F GT3	G	194	+19 Laps
23	LMGT3	78	(France) Akkodis ASP Team	(South Africa) Kelvin van der Linde (France) Arnold Robin (Austria) Clemens Schmid	Lexus 2UR-GSE 5.4 L V8	G	194	+19 Laps
24	LMGT3	87	(France) Akkodis ASP Team	(Japan) Takeshi Kimura (Argentina) José María López (France) Esteban Masson	Lexus RC F GT3	G	194	+19 Laps
24	LMGT3	87	(France) Akkodis ASP Team	(Japan) Takeshi Kimura (Argentina) José María López (France) Esteban Masson	Lexus 2UR-GSE 5.4 L V8	G	194	+19 Laps
25	LMGT3	60	(Italy) Iron Lynx	(Italy) Matteo Cressoni (France) Franck Perera (Italy) Claudio Schiavoni	Lamborghini Huracán GT3 Evo 2	G	193	+20 Laps
25	LMGT3	60	(Italy) Iron Lynx	(Italy) Matteo Cressoni (France) Franck Perera (Italy) Claudio Schiavoni	Lamborghini DGF 5.2 L V10	G	193	+20 Laps
26	LMGT3	91	(Germany) Manthey EMA	(Austria) Richard Lietz (Netherlands) Morris Schuring (Australia) Yasser Shahin	Porsche 911 GT3 R (992)	G	193	+20 Laps
26	LMGT3	91	(Germany) Manthey EMA	(Austria) Richard Lietz (Netherlands) Morris Schuring (Australia) Yasser Shahin	Porsche M97/80 4.2 L Flat-6	G	193	+20 Laps
27	LMGT3	77	(Germany) Proton Competition	(United Kingdom) Ben Barker (United States) Ryan Hardwick (Canada) Zacharie Robichon	Ford Mustang GT3	G	193	+20 Laps (Note: The No. 77 Proton Competition Ford received a 1-minute time penalty due to a pitlane infringement. Their final finishing position was unaffected.)
27	LMGT3	77	(Germany) Proton Competition	(United Kingdom) Ben Barker (United States) Ryan Hardwick (Canada) Zacharie Robichon	Ford Coyote 5.4 L V8	G	193	+20 Laps
28	LMGT3	88	(Germany) Proton Competition	(Norway) Dennis Olsen (Denmark) Mikkel O. Pedersen (Germany) Christian Ried	Ford Mustang GT3	G	192	+21 Laps
28	LMGT3	88	(Germany) Proton Competition	(Norway) Dennis Olsen (Denmark) Mikkel O. Pedersen (Germany) Christian Ried	Ford Coyote 5.4 L V8	G	192	+21 Laps
29	LMGT3	95	(United Kingdom) United Autosports	(United Kingdom) Josh Caygill (Chile) Nico Pino (Japan) Marino Sato	McLaren 720S GT3 Evo	G	191	+22 Laps
29	LMGT3	95	(United Kingdom) United Autosports	(United Kingdom) Josh Caygill (Chile) Nico Pino (Japan) Marino Sato	McLaren M840T 4.0 L Turbo V8	G	191	+22 Laps
DNF	Hypercar	20	(Belgium) BMW M Team WRT	(Netherlands) Robin Frijns (Germany) René Rast (South Africa) Sheldon van der Linde	BMW M Hybrid V8	M	202	Retired
DNF	Hypercar	20	(Belgium) BMW M Team WRT	(Netherlands) Robin Frijns (Germany) René Rast (South Africa) Sheldon van der Linde	BMW P66/3 4.0 L Turbo V8	M	202	Retired
DNF	Hypercar	2	(United States) Cadillac Racing	(New Zealand) Earl Bamber (United Kingdom) Alex Lynn	Cadillac V-Series.R	M	193	Collision damage
DNF	Hypercar	2	(United States) Cadillac Racing	(New Zealand) Earl Bamber (United Kingdom) Alex Lynn	Cadillac LMC55R 5.5 L V8	M	193	Collision damage
DNF	Hypercar	51	(Italy) Ferrari AF Corse	(United Kingdom) James Calado (Italy) Antonio Giovinazzi (Italy) Alessandro Pier Guidi	Ferrari 499P	M	168	Retired
DNF	Hypercar	51	(Italy) Ferrari AF Corse	(United Kingdom) James Calado (Italy) Antonio Giovinazzi (Italy) Alessandro Pier Guidi	Ferrari F163 3.0 L Turbo V6	M	168	Retired
DNF	LMGT3	82	(United Kingdom) TF Sport	(France) Sébastien Baud (Spain) Daniel Juncadella (Japan) Hiroshi Koizumi	Chevrolet Corvette Z06 GT3.R	G	164	Collision damage
DNF	LMGT3	82	(United Kingdom) TF Sport	(France) Sébastien Baud (Spain) Daniel Juncadella (Japan) Hiroshi Koizumi	Chevrolet LT6.R 5.5 L V8	G	164	Collision damage
DNF	Hypercar	7	(Japan) Toyota Gazoo Racing	(United Kingdom) Mike Conway (Japan) Kamui Kobayashi (Netherlands) Nyck de Vries	Toyota GR010 Hybrid	M	163	Collision damage
DNF	Hypercar	7	(Japan) Toyota Gazoo Racing	(United Kingdom) Mike Conway (Japan) Kamui Kobayashi (Netherlands) Nyck de Vries	Toyota H8909 3.5 L Turbo V6	M	163	Collision damage
DNF	Hypercar	5	(Germany) Porsche Penske Motorsport	(Australia) Matt Campbell (Denmark) Michael Christensen (France) Frédéric Makowiecki	Porsche 963	M	163	Collision damage
DNF	Hypercar	5	(Germany) Porsche Penske Motorsport	(Australia) Matt Campbell (Denmark) Michael Christensen (France) Frédéric Makowiecki	Porsche 9RD 4.6 L Turbo V8	M	163	Collision damage
DNF	Hypercar	63	(Italy) Lamborghini Iron Lynx	(Italy) Mirko Bortolotti; Daniil Kvyat (Italy) Edoardo Mortara	Lamborghini SC63	M	146	Gearbox
DNF	Hypercar	63	(Italy) Lamborghini Iron Lynx	(Italy) Mirko Bortolotti; Daniil Kvyat (Italy) Edoardo Mortara	Lamborghini 3.8 L Turbo V8	M	146	Gearbox

== Official recordings ==
- Free Practice 3 | 2024 6 Hours of Fuji on YouTube
- Full Qualifying and Hyperpole | 2024 6 Hours of Fuji on YouTube
- Full Race | 2024 6 Hours of Fuji on YouTube

FIA World Endurance Championship
Previous race: Lone Star Le Mans	2024 season	Next race: 8 Hours of Bahrain
