= 2024 8 Hours of Bahrain =

Sports car endurance race

Event information
- Round 8 of 8 in the 2024 FIA World Endurance Championship
- Date: 2 November 2024
- Location: Sakhir
- Venue: Bahrain International Circuit
- Duration: 8 Hours

Results
- Laps completed: 235
- Distance (km): 1271.571
- Distance (miles): 790.118
- Hypercar

Pole position
- Time: 1:46.714
- Team: (Japan) Toyota Gazoo Racing

Winners
- Team: (Japan) Toyota Gazoo Racing
- Drivers: (Switzerland) Sébastien Buemi (New Zealand) Brendon Hartley (Japan) Ryō Hirakawa
- LMGT3

Winners
- Team: (Italy) Vista AF Corse
- Drivers: (France) François Hériau (United States) Simon Mann (Italy) Alessio Rovera

The 2024 8 Hours of Bahrain (officially known as the 2024 Bapco Energies 8 Hours of Bahrain) was an endurance sportscar racing event held on 2 November 2024, as the eighth and final round of the 2024 FIA World Endurance Championship. It was the thirteenth running of the event, and the sixth running of the event in an extended 8-hour format.

== Background ==
The event, which ran over a duration of eight hours for the sixth time in a row, was announced during the 2023 24 Hours of Le Mans weekend. The 8 Hours of Bahrain has been featured on the calendar since the series' inception in 2012.

== Entry list ==
The entry list was published on 17 October 2024, and saw several changes compared to the previous entry list. Sébastien Bourdais re-joined the No. 2 Cadillac Racing crew, after previously having driven at the 2024 Qatar 1812 km. After Nicolas Lapierre's decision to retire from racing with immediate effect, Jules Gounon took over his seat in the No. 35 Alpine Endurance Team entry, whilst Charles Milesi joined the No. 36 crew. In LMGT3, Giorgio Roda joined the No. 88 Proton Competition team for the first time since Le Mans. Giammarco Levorato replaced Mikkel O. Pedersen in the same car. Furthermore, Franck Perera was replaced by Matteo Cairoli in the No. 60 Iron Lynx entry. Finally, Conrad Laursen replaced Clemens Schmid in the No. 78 Akkodis ASP Team entry.

== Schedule ==
Date	Time (local: AST)	Event
Thursday, 31 October	12:15	Free Practice 1
Thursday, 31 October	17:30	Free Practice 2
Friday, 1 November	12:00	Free Practice 3
Friday, 1 November	16:00	Qualifying - LMGT3
Friday, 1 November	16:20	Hyperpole - LMGT3
Friday, 1 November	16:40	Qualifying - Hypercar
Friday, 1 November	17:00	Hyperpole - Hypercar
Saturday, 2 November	14:00	Race

== Practice ==
Three practice sessions were held before the event: two were held on Thursday, and one was held on Friday. The sessions on Thursday morning and Thursday afternoon lasted 90 minutes, and the session on Fruday morning lasted 60 minutes.

=== Practice 1 ===
The first practice session started at 12:15 AST on Thursday. Paul di Resta topped the session in the No. 94 Peugeot TotalEnergies entry, with a lap time of 1:50.837. Frédéric Makowiecki's No. 5 Porsche Penske Motorsport car was second-quickest, 0.049 seconds behind Di Resta. The No. 51 Ferrari AF Corse entry of Antonio Giovinazzi was third-quickest, 0.204 seconds behind Di Resta. Jean-Éric Vergne and Laurens Vanthoor rounded out the top five in the No. 93 Peugeot and No. 6 Porsche, respectively. Kelvin van der Linde led LMGT3 in the No. 78 Akkodis ASP Team entry, with a lap time of 2 minutes, 2.079 seconds. Alessio Rovera slotted in to second place in the No. 55 Vista AF Corse entry, 0.263 seconds behind Van der Linde. Matteo Cairoli rounded out the top three in the No. 60 Iron Lynx entry, 0.739 seconds behind Van der Linde.

Class	No.	Entrant	Driver	Time
Hypercar	94	(France) Peugeot TotalEnergies	(United Kingdom) Paul di Resta	1:50.837
LMGT3	78	(France) Akkodis ASP Team	(South Africa) Kelvin van der Linde	2:02.079

- Note: Only the fastest car in each class is shown.

=== Practice 2 ===
The second practice session started at 17:30 AST on Thursday, and saw Dries Vanthoor lead the session in the No. 15 BMW M Team WRT entry, with a lap time of 1:48.257. He was 0.054 seconds quicker than Matt Campbell in the No. 5 Porsche, with Giovinazzi in the No. 51 Ferrari once again taking the third position, 0.215 seconds behind Vanthoor. Esteban Masson led the LMGT3 class in the No. 87 Lexus, with a lap time of 2:02.246. He was 0.655 seconds quicker than Hiroshi Koizumi in the No. 82 TF Sport entry, with François Hériau rounding out the top three in the No. 55 Ferrari.

Class	No.	Entrant	Driver	Time
Hypercar	15	(Belgium) BMW M Team WRT	(Belgium) Dries Vanthoor	1:48.257
LMGT3	87	(France) Akkodis ASP Team	(France) Esteban Masson	2:02.246

- Note: Only the fastest car in each class is shown.

=== Final practice ===
The third and final practice session started at 12:00 AST on Friday, which saw Vergne topping the time sheets in the No. 93 Peugeot with a lap time of 1:49.443. He was 0.219 seconds quicker than Yifei Ye in the No. 83 AF Corse entry, with Daniil Kvyat finishing third-quickest in the No. 63 Lamborghini Iron Lynx entry. Alex Malykhin led the LMGT3 class in the No. 92 Manthey PureRxcing entry, lapping the circuit in 2 minutes, 3.987 seconds. His lap was 0.054 seconds quicker than that of second-placed Arnold Robin in the No. 78 Lexus, with Hériau finishing third-quickest in the No. 55 Ferrari.

Class	No.	Entrant	Driver	Time
Hypercar	93	(France) Peugeot TotalEnergies	(France) Jean-Éric Vergne	1:49.443
LMGT3	92	(Lithuania) Manthey PureRxcing	(Saint Kitts and Nevis) Alex Malykhin	2:03.987

- Note: Only the fastest car in each class is shown.

== Qualifying ==
=== Qualifying results ===
Pole position winners in each class are marked in bold.

Pos	Class	No.	Entrant	Qualifying	Hyperpole	Grid
1	**Hypercar**	**8**	**(Japan) Toyota Gazoo Racing**	**1:47.698**	**1:46.714**	1
2	Hypercar	7	(Japan) Toyota Gazoo Racing	1:47.498	1:47.037	2
3	Hypercar	51	(Italy) Ferrari AF Corse	1:47.531	1:47.080	3
4	Hypercar	99	(Germany) Proton Competition	1:48.101	1:47.234	4
5	Hypercar	50	(Italy) Ferrari AF Corse	1:48.014	1:47.527	5
6	Hypercar	6	(Germany) Porsche Penske Motorsport	1:48.042	1:47.542	6
7	Hypercar	5	(Germany) Porsche Penske Motorsport	1:47.944	1:47.630	7
8	Hypercar	12	(United Kingdom) Hertz Team Jota	1:47.857	1:47.950	8
9	Hypercar	15	(Belgium) BMW M Team WRT	1:47.741	1:47.970	9
10	Hypercar	20	(Belgium) BMW M Team WRT	1:47.550	1:54.564	10
11	Hypercar	38	(United Kingdom) Hertz Team Jota	1:48.263		11
12	Hypercar	83	(Italy) AF Corse	1:48.282		13 (Note: The No. 83 AF Corse entry received a 1-place grid drop after impeding the No. 35 Alpine Endurance Team entry in the qualifying session.)
13	Hypercar	2	(United States) Cadillac Racing	1:48.466		12
14	Hypercar	35	(France) Alpine Endurance Team	1:48.534		14
15	Hypercar	94	(France) Peugeot TotalEnergies	1:48.552		15
16	Hypercar	63	(Italy) Lamborghini Iron Lynx	1:48.555		16
17	Hypercar	36	(France) Alpine Endurance Team	1:48.796		17
18	Hypercar	93	(France) Peugeot TotalEnergies	No time		18
19	**LMGT3**	**95**	**(United Kingdom) United Autosports**	**2:02.311**	**2:02.201**	19
20	LMGT3	59	(United Kingdom) United Autosports	2:02.714	2:02.203	20
21	LMGT3	55	(Italy) Vista AF Corse	2:02.458	2:02.367	21
22	LMGT3	85	(Italy) Iron Dames	2:02.591	2:02.636	22
23	LMGT3	92	(Lithuania) Manthey PureRxcing	2:03.202	2:02.720	23
24	LMGT3	27	(United States) Heart of Racing Team	2:03.140	2:02.949	24
25	LMGT3	54	(Italy) Vista AF Corse	2:02.679	2:03.033	25
26	LMGT3	81	(United Kingdom) TF Sport	2:03.272	2:03.125	26
27	LMGT3	82	(United Kingdom) TF Sport	2:02.959	2:03.176	27
28	LMGT3	78	(France) Akkodis ASP Team	2:03.641	2:03.269	28
29	LMGT3	777	(Japan) D'station Racing	2:03.763		29
30	LMGT3	31	(Belgium) Team WRT	2:03.785		30
31	LMGT3	46	(Belgium) Team WRT	2:03.797		31
32	LMGT3	91	(Germany) Manthey EMA	2:03.975		32
33	LMGT3	88	(Germany) Proton Competition	2:04.315		33
34	LMGT3	77	(Germany) Proton Competition	2:04.606		34
35	LMGT3	87	(France) Akkodis ASP Team	2:04.772		35
36	LMGT3	60	(Italy) Iron Lynx	2:05.237		36

== Race ==
=== Race results ===
The minimum number of laps for classification (70% of overall winning car's distance) was 164 laps. Class winners are in bold and ‡.

Pos	Class	No	Team	Drivers	Chassis	Tyre	Laps	Time/Retired
Pos	Class	No	Team	Drivers	Engine	Tyre	Laps	Time/Retired
1	**Hypercar**	**8**	**(Japan) Toyota Gazoo Racing**	**(Switzerland) Sébastien Buemi (New Zealand) Brendon Hartley (Japan) Ryo Hirakawa**	**Toyota GR010 Hybrid**	M	**235**	**8:01:25.839‡**
1	**Hypercar**	**8**	**(Japan) Toyota Gazoo Racing**	**(Switzerland) Sébastien Buemi (New Zealand) Brendon Hartley (Japan) Ryo Hirakawa**	**Toyota H8909 3.5 L Turbo V6**	M	**235**	**8:01:25.839‡**
2	Hypercar	5	(Germany) Porsche Penske Motorsport	(Australia) Matt Campbell (Denmark) Michael Christensen (France) Frédéric Makowiecki	Porsche 963	M	235	+29.177
2	Hypercar	5	(Germany) Porsche Penske Motorsport	(Australia) Matt Campbell (Denmark) Michael Christensen (France) Frédéric Makowiecki	Porsche 9RD 4.6 L Turbo V8	M	235	+29.177
3	Hypercar	93	(France) Peugeot TotalEnergies	(Denmark) Mikkel Jensen (Switzerland) Nico Müller (France) Jean-Éric Vergne	Peugeot 9X8	M	235	+36.799
3	Hypercar	93	(France) Peugeot TotalEnergies	(Denmark) Mikkel Jensen (Switzerland) Nico Müller (France) Jean-Éric Vergne	Peugeot X6H 2.6 L Turbo V6	M	235	+36.799
4	Hypercar	35	(France) Alpine Endurance Team	(France) Paul-Loup Chatin (France) Jules Gounon (Austria) Ferdinand Habsburg	Alpine A424	M	235	+37.404
4	Hypercar	35	(France) Alpine Endurance Team	(France) Paul-Loup Chatin (France) Jules Gounon (Austria) Ferdinand Habsburg	Alpine V634 3.4 L Turbo V6	M	235	+37.404
5	Hypercar	15	(Belgium) BMW M Team WRT	(Switzerland) Raffaele Marciello (Belgium) Dries Vanthoor (Germany) Marco Wittmann	BMW M Hybrid V8	M	235	+47.916
5	Hypercar	15	(Belgium) BMW M Team WRT	(Switzerland) Raffaele Marciello (Belgium) Dries Vanthoor (Germany) Marco Wittmann	BMW P66/3 4.0 L Turbo V8	M	235	+47.916
6	Hypercar	2	(United States) Cadillac Racing	(New Zealand) Earl Bamber (France) Sébastien Bourdais (United Kingdom) Alex Lynn	Cadillac V-Series.R	M	235	+55.841
6	Hypercar	2	(United States) Cadillac Racing	(New Zealand) Earl Bamber (France) Sébastien Bourdais (United Kingdom) Alex Lynn	Cadillac LMC55R 5.5 L V8	M	235	+55.841
7	Hypercar	38	(United Kingdom) Hertz Team Jota	(United Kingdom) Jenson Button (United Kingdom) Phil Hanson (Denmark) Oliver Rasmussen	Porsche 963	M	235	+1:00.834
7	Hypercar	38	(United Kingdom) Hertz Team Jota	(United Kingdom) Jenson Button (United Kingdom) Phil Hanson (Denmark) Oliver Rasmussen	Porsche 9RD 4.6 L Turbo V8	M	235	+1:00.834
8	Hypercar	83	(Italy) AF Corse	(Poland) Robert Kubica (Israel) Robert Shwartzman (China) Yifei Ye	Ferrari 499P	M	235	+1:03.539
8	Hypercar	83	(Italy) AF Corse	(Poland) Robert Kubica (Israel) Robert Shwartzman (China) Yifei Ye	Ferrari F163 3.0 L Turbo V6	M	235	+1:03.539
9	Hypercar	36	(France) Alpine Endurance Team	(France) Charles Milesi (Germany) Mick Schumacher (France) Matthieu Vaxivière	Alpine A424	M	235	+1:12.064 (Note: The No. 36 Alpine Endurance Team entry received a 5-second penalty for causing a collision with the No. 50 Ferrari AF Corse entry. Their final finishing position was unaffected.)
9	Hypercar	36	(France) Alpine Endurance Team	(France) Charles Milesi (Germany) Mick Schumacher (France) Matthieu Vaxivière	Alpine V634 3.4 L Turbo V6	M	235	+1:12.064
10	Hypercar	6	(Germany) Porsche Penske Motorsport	(France) Kévin Estre (Germany) André Lotterer (Belgium) Laurens Vanthoor	Porsche 963	M	235	+1:19.711 (Note: The No. 6 Porsche Penske Motorsport received two 5-second penalties: the first was for overtaking the No. 15 BMW M Team WRT entry off the track, whilst the second was for causing a collision with the No. 36 Alpine Endurance Team entry. Their final finishing position was unaffected.)
10	Hypercar	6	(Germany) Porsche Penske Motorsport	(France) Kévin Estre (Germany) André Lotterer (Belgium) Laurens Vanthoor	Porsche 9RD 4.6 L Turbo V8	M	235	+1:19.711
11	Hypercar	50	(Italy) Ferrari AF Corse	(Italy) Antonio Fuoco (Spain) Miguel Molina (Denmark) Nicklas Nielsen	Ferrari 499P	M	235	+1:30.651
11	Hypercar	50	(Italy) Ferrari AF Corse	(Italy) Antonio Fuoco (Spain) Miguel Molina (Denmark) Nicklas Nielsen	Ferrari F163 3.0 L Turbo V6	M	235	+1:30.651
12	Hypercar	99	(Germany) Proton Competition	(France) Julien Andlauer (Switzerland) Neel Jani (United Kingdom) Harry Tincknell	Porsche 963	M	234	+1 Lap
12	Hypercar	99	(Germany) Proton Competition	(France) Julien Andlauer (Switzerland) Neel Jani (United Kingdom) Harry Tincknell	Porsche 9RD 4.6 L Turbo V8	M	234	+1 Lap
13	Hypercar	12	(United Kingdom) Hertz Team Jota	(United Kingdom) Callum Ilott (France) Norman Nato (United Kingdom) Will Stevens	Porsche 963	M	234	+1 Lap
13	Hypercar	12	(United Kingdom) Hertz Team Jota	(United Kingdom) Callum Ilott (France) Norman Nato (United Kingdom) Will Stevens	Porsche 9RD 4.6 L Turbo V8	M	234	+1 Lap
14	Hypercar	51	(Italy) Ferrari AF Corse	(United Kingdom) James Calado (Italy) Antonio Giovinazzi (Italy) Alessandro Pier Guidi	Ferrari 499P	M	233	+2 Laps (Note: The No. 51 Ferrari AF Corse entry received a 295-second penalty for using 2 more tyres than the tyre allocation allowed. They dropped from 2nd to 14th overall.)
14	Hypercar	51	(Italy) Ferrari AF Corse	(United Kingdom) James Calado (Italy) Antonio Giovinazzi (Italy) Alessandro Pier Guidi	Ferrari F163 3.0 L Turbo V6	M	233	+2 Laps
15	**LMGT3**	**55**	**(Italy) Vista AF Corse**	**(France) François Hériau (United States) Simon Mann (Italy) Alessio Rovera**	**Ferrari 296 GT3**	G	**214**	**+21 Laps‡**
15	**LMGT3**	**55**	**(Italy) Vista AF Corse**	**(France) François Hériau (United States) Simon Mann (Italy) Alessio Rovera**	**Ferrari F163CE 3.0 L Turbo V6**	G	**214**	**+21 Laps‡**
16	LMGT3	81	(United Kingdom) TF Sport	(Angola) Rui Andrade (Republic of Ireland) Charlie Eastwood (Belgium) Tom van Rompuy	Chevrolet Corvette Z06 GT3.R	G	214	+21 Laps
16	LMGT3	81	(United Kingdom) TF Sport	(Angola) Rui Andrade (Republic of Ireland) Charlie Eastwood (Belgium) Tom van Rompuy	Chevrolet LT6.R 5.5 L V8	G	214	+21 Laps
17	LMGT3	82	(United Kingdom) TF Sport	(France) Sébastien Baud (Spain) Daniel Juncadella (Japan) Hiroshi Koizumi	Chevrolet Corvette Z06 GT3.R	G	214	+21 Laps
17	LMGT3	82	(United Kingdom) TF Sport	(France) Sébastien Baud (Spain) Daniel Juncadella (Japan) Hiroshi Koizumi	Chevrolet LT6.R 5.5 L V8	G	214	+21 Laps
18	LMGT3	60	(Italy) Iron Lynx	(Italy) Matteo Cairoli (Italy) Matteo Cressoni (Italy) Claudio Schiavoni	Lamborghini Huracán GT3 Evo 2	G	214	+21 Laps
18	LMGT3	60	(Italy) Iron Lynx	(Italy) Matteo Cairoli (Italy) Matteo Cressoni (Italy) Claudio Schiavoni	Lamborghini DGF 5.2 L V10	G	214	+21 Laps
19	LMGT3	91	(Germany) Manthey EMA	(Austria) Richard Lietz (Netherlands) Morris Schuring (Australia) Yasser Shahin	Porsche 911 GT3 R (992)	G	214	+21 Laps
19	LMGT3	91	(Germany) Manthey EMA	(Austria) Richard Lietz (Netherlands) Morris Schuring (Australia) Yasser Shahin	Porsche M97/80 4.2 L Flat-6	G	214	+21 Laps
20	LMGT3	59	(United Kingdom) United Autosports	(Brazil) Nicolas Costa (United Kingdom) James Cottingham (Switzerland) Grégoire Saucy	McLaren 720S GT3 Evo	G	214	+21 Laps
20	LMGT3	59	(United Kingdom) United Autosports	(Brazil) Nicolas Costa (United Kingdom) James Cottingham (Switzerland) Grégoire Saucy	McLaren M840T 4.0 L Turbo V8	G	214	+21 Laps
21	LMGT3	54	(Italy) Vista AF Corse	(Italy) Francesco Castellacci (Switzerland) Thomas Flohr (Italy) Davide Rigon	Ferrari 296 GT3	G	214	+21 Laps
21	LMGT3	54	(Italy) Vista AF Corse	(Italy) Francesco Castellacci (Switzerland) Thomas Flohr (Italy) Davide Rigon	Ferrari F163CE 3.0 L Turbo V6	G	214	+21 Laps
22	LMGT3	95	(United Kingdom) United Autosports	(United Kingdom) Josh Caygill (Chile) Nico Pino (Japan) Marino Sato	McLaren 720S GT3 Evo	G	214	+21 Laps
22	LMGT3	95	(United Kingdom) United Autosports	(United Kingdom) Josh Caygill (Chile) Nico Pino (Japan) Marino Sato	McLaren M840T 4.0 L Turbo V8	G	214	+21 Laps
23	LMGT3	92	(Lithuania) Manthey PureRxcing	(Austria) Klaus Bachler (Saint Kitts and Nevis) Alex Malykhin (Germany) Joel Sturm	Porsche 911 GT3 R (992)	G	214	+21 Laps
23	LMGT3	92	(Lithuania) Manthey PureRxcing	(Austria) Klaus Bachler (Saint Kitts and Nevis) Alex Malykhin (Germany) Joel Sturm	Porsche M97/80 4.2 L Flat-6	G	214	+21 Laps
24	LMGT3	85	(Italy) Iron Dames	(Belgium) Sarah Bovy (Switzerland) Rahel Frey (Denmark) Michelle Gatting	Lamborghini Huracán GT3 Evo 2	G	214	+21 Laps
24	LMGT3	85	(Italy) Iron Dames	(Belgium) Sarah Bovy (Switzerland) Rahel Frey (Denmark) Michelle Gatting	Lamborghini DGF 5.2 L V10	G	214	+21 Laps
25	LMGT3	27	(United States) Heart of Racing Team	(United Kingdom) Ian James (Italy) Daniel Mancinelli (Spain) Alex Riberas	Aston Martin Vantage AMR GT3 Evo	G	214	+21 Laps
25	LMGT3	27	(United States) Heart of Racing Team	(United Kingdom) Ian James (Italy) Daniel Mancinelli (Spain) Alex Riberas	Aston Martin M177 4.0 L Turbo V8	G	214	+21 Laps
26	LMGT3	777	(Japan) D'station Racing	(France) Erwan Bastard (France) Clément Mateu (Denmark) Marco Sørensen	Aston Martin Vantage AMR GT3 Evo	G	214	+21 Laps
26	LMGT3	777	(Japan) D'station Racing	(France) Erwan Bastard (France) Clément Mateu (Denmark) Marco Sørensen	Aston Martin M177 4.0 L Turbo V8	G	214	+21 Laps
27	LMGT3	31	(Belgium) Team WRT	(Brazil) Augusto Farfus (Indonesia) Sean Gelael (United Kingdom) Darren Leung	BMW M4 GT3	G	214	+21 Laps (Note: The No. 31 Team WRT entry received a drive-through penalty for causing a collision with the No. 27 Heart of Racing Team entry. Since they finished the race before taking the drive-through penalty, it was converted into a 50-second time penalty. They dropped from 26th to 27th overall, and from 12th to 13th in class.)
27	LMGT3	31	(Belgium) Team WRT	(Brazil) Augusto Farfus (Indonesia) Sean Gelael (United Kingdom) Darren Leung	BMW P58 3.0 L Turbo I6	G	214	+21 Laps
28	LMGT3	46	(Belgium) Team WRT	(Oman) Ahmad Al Harthy (Belgium) Maxime Martin (Italy) Valentino Rossi	BMW M4 GT3	G	213	+22 Laps
28	LMGT3	46	(Belgium) Team WRT	(Oman) Ahmad Al Harthy (Belgium) Maxime Martin (Italy) Valentino Rossi	BMW P58 3.0 L Turbo I6	G	213	+22 Laps
DNF	Hypercar	63	(Italy) Lamborghini Iron Lynx	(Italy) Mirko Bortolotti; Daniil Kvyat (Italy) Edoardo Mortara	Lamborghini SC63	M	200	Did not finish
DNF	Hypercar	63	(Italy) Lamborghini Iron Lynx	(Italy) Mirko Bortolotti; Daniil Kvyat (Italy) Edoardo Mortara	Lamborghini 3.8 L Turbo V8	M	200	Did not finish
DNF	Hypercar	94	(France) Peugeot TotalEnergies	(United Kingdom) Paul di Resta (France) Loïc Duval (Belgium) Stoffel Vandoorne	Peugeot 9X8	M	179	Did not finish
DNF	Hypercar	94	(France) Peugeot TotalEnergies	(United Kingdom) Paul di Resta (France) Loïc Duval (Belgium) Stoffel Vandoorne	Peugeot X6H 2.6 L Turbo V6	M	179	Did not finish
DNF	LMGT3	77	(Germany) Proton Competition	(United Kingdom) Ben Barker (United States) Ryan Hardwick (Canada) Zacharie Robichon	Ford Mustang GT3	G	178	Did not finish
DNF	LMGT3	77	(Germany) Proton Competition	(United Kingdom) Ben Barker (United States) Ryan Hardwick (Canada) Zacharie Robichon	Ford Coyote 5.4 L V8	G	178	Did not finish
DNF	LMGT3	87	(France) Akkodis ASP Team	(Japan) Takeshi Kimura (Argentina) José María López (France) Esteban Masson	Lexus RC F GT3	G	176	Did not finish
DNF	LMGT3	87	(France) Akkodis ASP Team	(Japan) Takeshi Kimura (Argentina) José María López (France) Esteban Masson	Lexus 2UR-GSE 5.4 L V8	G	176	Did not finish
DNF	Hypercar	7	(Japan) Toyota Gazoo Racing	(United Kingdom) Mike Conway (Japan) Kamui Kobayashi (Netherlands) Nyck de Vries	Toyota GR010 Hybrid	M	175	Did not finish
DNF	Hypercar	7	(Japan) Toyota Gazoo Racing	(United Kingdom) Mike Conway (Japan) Kamui Kobayashi (Netherlands) Nyck de Vries	Toyota H8909 3.5 L Turbo V6	M	175	Did not finish
DNF	LMGT3	88	(Germany) Proton Competition	(Italy) Giammarco Levorato (Norway) Dennis Olsen (Italy) Giorgio Roda	Ford Mustang GT3	G	148	Did not finish
DNF	LMGT3	88	(Germany) Proton Competition	(Italy) Giammarco Levorato (Norway) Dennis Olsen (Italy) Giorgio Roda	Ford Coyote 5.4 L V8	G	148	Did not finish
DNF	Hypercar	20	(Belgium) BMW M Team WRT	(Netherlands) Robin Frijns (Germany) René Rast (South Africa) Sheldon van der Linde	BMW M Hybrid V8	M	111	Did not finish
DNF	Hypercar	20	(Belgium) BMW M Team WRT	(Netherlands) Robin Frijns (Germany) René Rast (South Africa) Sheldon van der Linde	BMW P66/3 4.0 L Turbo V8	M	111	Did not finish
DNF	LMGT3	78	(France) Akkodis ASP Team	(Denmark) Conrad Laursen (South Africa) Kelvin van der Linde (France) Arnold Robin	Lexus RC F GT3	G	36	Did not finish
DNF	LMGT3	78	(France) Akkodis ASP Team	(Denmark) Conrad Laursen (South Africa) Kelvin van der Linde (France) Arnold Robin	Lexus 2UR-GSE 5.4 L V8	G	36	Did not finish

== Official recordings ==
- Free Practice 3 | 2024 8 Hours of Bahrain on YouTube
- Full Qualifying and Hyperpole | 2024 8 Hours of Bahrain on YouTube
- Full Race | 2024 8 Hours of Bahrain on YouTube
