= Peugeot 9X8 =

Sports racing car

- The No. 93 9X8 being driven at the 2026 6 Hours of Spa-Francorchamps
- Category: Le Mans Hypercar
- Constructor: Peugeot (Ligier)
- Designers: Matthias Hossann (Design Director); Vadim Gilca (Exterior Designer); Olivier Jansonnie (Technical Director)
- Predecessor: Peugeot 908

Technical specifications
- Length: 5,000 mm (197 in; 16 ft)
- Width: 2,080 mm (82 in; 7 ft)
- Height: 1,180 mm (46 in; 4 ft)
- Wheelbase: 3,045 mm (120 in; 10 ft)
- Engine: Peugeot X6H 2.6 litre V6 90° twin-turbo mid-engined, longitudinally mounted AWD (Peugeot Hybrid A) limited to 8,500 minutes inverse
- Electric motor: Peugeot Sport-conceived front-mounted Separate motor-generator unit + single-speed reducer
- Transmission: Sadev 7-speed sequential manual
- Battery: High-density 900-volt battery co-designed by Peugeot Sport, TotalEnergies/Saft
- Power: 671 bhp (680 PS; 500 kW) (Petrol); 268 bhp (272 PS; 200 kW) (Electric)
- Fuel: TotalEnergies
- Lubricants: TotalEnergies
- Brakes: Carbone Industrie carbon 380/365mm with AP Monobloc 6-piston calipers
- Tyres: Michelin slicks with OZ one-piece forged alloys, 31/71-18, after 29/71-18 front and 34/71-18 rear

Competition history
- Notable entrants: (France) Peugeot Sport
- Notable drivers: (United Kingdom) Paul di Resta; (France) Loïc Duval; (Denmark) Mikkel Jensen; (United States) Gustavo Menezes; (France) Jean-Éric Vergne; (United Kingdom) James Rossiter; (Switzerland) Nico Müller; (Belgium) Stoffel Vandoorne
- Debut: 2022 6 Hours of Monza
- Last event: 2026 6 Hours Of Monza
Races	Wins	Podiums	Poles	F/Laps
29	0	4	1	1
- Teams' Championships: 0
- Constructors' Championships: 0
- Drivers' Championships: 0

The Peugeot 9X8 is a sports prototype racing car built by French car manufacturer Peugeot for the Le Mans Hypercar category in the FIA World Endurance Championship. Their first sports prototype in 11 years, the car made its debut at the 2022 6 Hours of Monza.

Peugeot states the 9X8's name to be a combination of multiple elements: the 9 symbolizes the brand's high-performance models, the X represents all-wheel drive and electric drive technologies, and the 8 corresponds to the brand's contemporary models.

== Development ==
On 13 November 2019, Peugeot announced their return to the FIA World Endurance Championship and the 24 Hours of Le Mans for the 2022 season in the newly announced Le Mans Hypercar category. Their debut was subsequently delayed, with Peugeot stating that the homologation process for the Le Mans Hypercar category went against any chance of earlier participation in the season. The car eventually made its debut at the 2022 6 Hours of Monza.

Succeeding the 905, 908 HDi FAP, and 908, the 9X8 was designed to take full advantage of the freedoms allowed by the new regulations for the Hypercar category. The first area to benefit from the new regulations is aerodynamics; the vehicle is allowed to have only one adjustable aerodynamic element without the FIA specifying what it should be, thus allowing Peugeot to do without the rear wing. The 9X8 is powered by a 500 kW (670 hp) twin-turbo 2.6-litre V6 engine mated to a 7-speed sequential gearbox driving the rear wheels, while a 200 kW (270 hp) electric motor drives the front wheels.

Peugeot's on-track testing program began in December 2021, later visiting Algarve International Circuit, Circuit Paul Ricard, MotorLand Aragón, Circuit de Barcelona-Catalunya, and Circuit de Nevers Magny-Cours, with the 9X8 clocking up more than 10,000 kilometres over the course of 25 test days.

In April 2023, a Lego Technic 1:10 scale model of the 9X8 was announced. The set consists of 1,775 pieces and was released on May 1, 2023.

== Competition history ==
In the World Endurance Championship, the two Peugeots use numbers 93 and 94, as a reference to Peugeot's overall victory at the 1993 24 Hours of Le Mans. Paul Di Resta, Loïc Duval, Mikkel Jensen, Gustavo Menezes, James Rossiter and Jean-Éric Vergne were nominated to share driving duties and form the crews of the two-car entry in the 2022 6 Hours of Monza, with the composition of each trio due to be confirmed at a later stage following the conclusion of the car's testing program. The two 9X8s were then set to contest the remainder of the 2022 FIA World Endurance Championship, including the 2022 6 Hours of Fuji and season finale, the 2022 8 Hours of Bahrain.

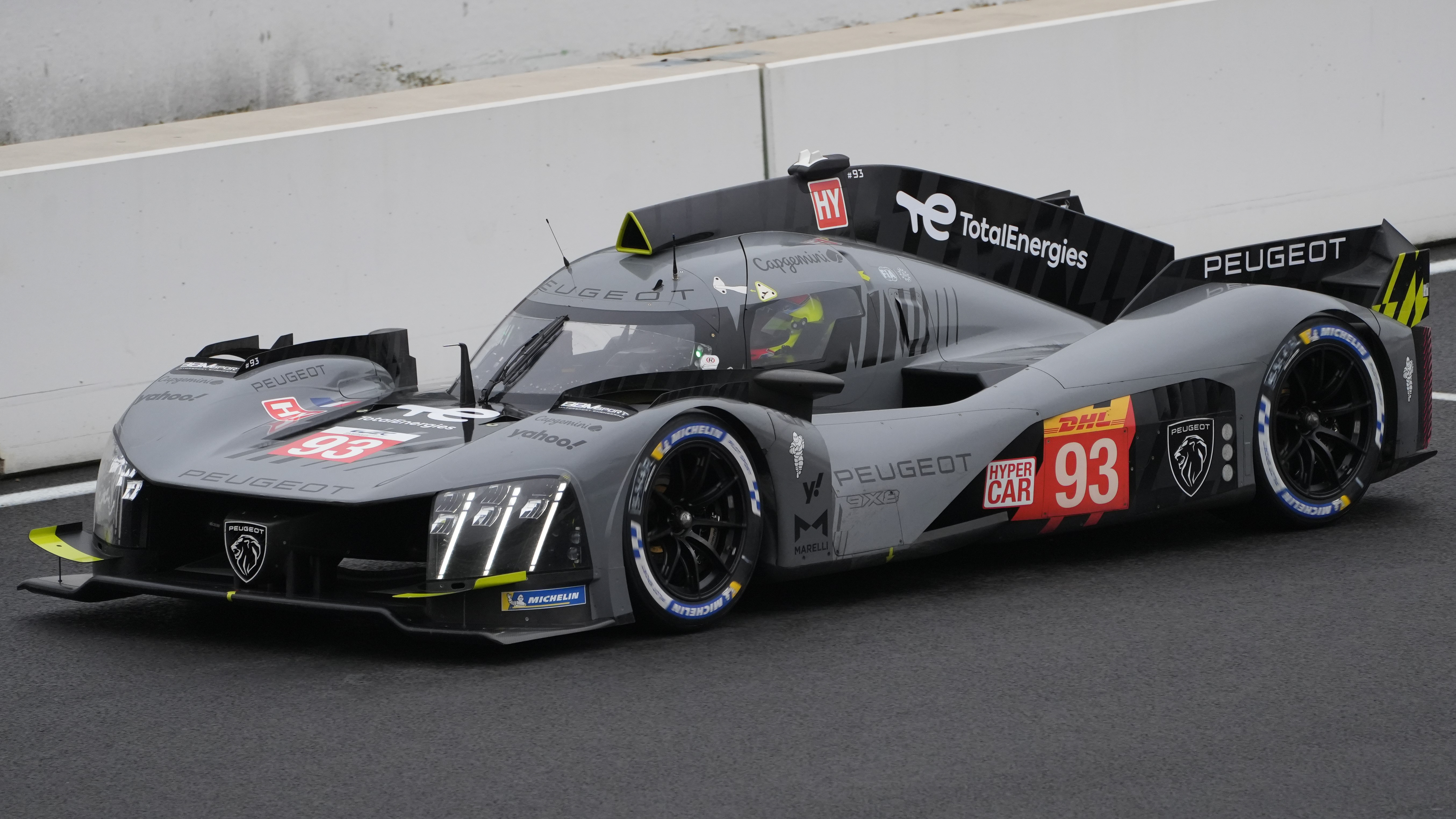
The 9X8 with the wingless concept at the 2023 6 Hours of Spa-Francorchamps.

The 9X8 saw its first full season in the 2023 FIA World Endurance Championship. Rossiter would not return to the lineup and Nico Müller would instead share the driving duties for the full year in the #94. The wingless concept proved most effective at the 2023 24 Hours of Le Mans and 2023 6 Hours of Monza. Despite qualifying towards the back in the former, Peugeot would take the lead in the evening hours of the race before suffering heavy damage requiring repairs. At Monza, the 9X8 would score its first podium in the FIA World Endurance Championship by finishing 3rd.

Peugeot returned to contest another full season in the FIA World Endurance Championship. Both lineups would be shuffled, and Stoffel Vandoorne would replace an outgoing Gustavo Menezes for the season. At Qatar, the 9X8 would see arguably its most competitive race, as the #93 car would contest for the race win against the Porsche 963s of Porsche Penske Motorsport before eventually retiring and later being disqualified for running out of fuel on the final lap and failing to join parc fermé at the end of the race.

On 25 March 2024, Peugeot presented an updated version of the 9X8 with an added rear wing; the previous version of the 9X8 proved mostly uncompetitive due to its dependency on ground effect, especially harmed by uneven road surfaces like at Sebring (where WEC did not race in 2024). Peugeot also abandoned equal tyre widths, switching from 31 cm tyres all around to 29 cm tyres at the front and 34 cm at the rear like all its competitors. The new concept made its first competitive appearance at the 2024 6 Hours of Imola. It scored its first podium at the 2024 8 Hours of Bahrain.

Ahead of the 2025 season, Malthe Jakobsen was confirmed to be joining the team following Nico Müller's departure. After a difficult first half of the season, Peugeot recovered with a double points finish in São Paulo, later achieving their best pair of results with the 9X8 in the following race at the 2025 Lone Star Le Mans, finishing 3rd and 4th on route to the 9X8's third overall podium.

Peugeot scored their maiden pole position in the FIA World Endurance Championship at the 2026 6 Hours of Spa-Francorchamps, courtesy of Jakobsen. Their pace did not translate into the race, fading towards the midfield, with their pole-sitting No. 94 ultimately retiring from the race following a collision with Iron Lynx's No. 79 Mercedes-AMG GT3 Evo. The sister No. 93 car completed the race in 7th.

== Complete World Endurance Championship results ==
(key) Races in bold indicates pole position. Races in italics indicates fastest lap.

Year	Entrants	Class	Drivers	No.	1	2	3	4	5	6	7	8	Points	Pos
2022	Peugeot TotalEnergies	Hypercar			SEB	SPA	LMN	MON	FUJ	BHR			42	4th
2022	Peugeot TotalEnergies	Hypercar	(United Kingdom) Paul di Resta	93				Ret	4	Ret			42	4th
2022	Peugeot TotalEnergies	Hypercar	(Denmark) Mikkel Jensen	93				Ret	4	Ret			42	4th
2022	Peugeot TotalEnergies	Hypercar	(France) Jean-Éric Vergne	93				Ret	4	Ret			42	4th
2022	Peugeot TotalEnergies	Hypercar	(France) Loïc Duval	94				4	5	4			42	4th
2022	Peugeot TotalEnergies	Hypercar	(United States) Gustavo Menezes	94				4	5	4			42	4th
2022	Peugeot TotalEnergies	Hypercar	(Switzerland) Nico Müller	94						4			42	4th
2022	Peugeot TotalEnergies	Hypercar	(United Kingdom) James Rossiter	94				4	5				42	4th
2023	Peugeot TotalEnergies	Hypercar			SEB	POR	SPA	LMN	MON	FUJ	BHR		67	5th
2023	Peugeot TotalEnergies	Hypercar	(United Kingdom) Paul di Resta	93	9	7	8	6	3	8	9		67	5th
2023	Peugeot TotalEnergies	Hypercar	(Denmark) Mikkel Jensen	93	9	7	8	6	3	8	9		67	5th
2023	Peugeot TotalEnergies	Hypercar	(France) Jean-Éric Vergne	93	9	7	8	6	3	8	9		67	5th
2023	Peugeot TotalEnergies	Hypercar	(France) Loïc Duval	94	NC	5	9	9	11	7	8		67	5th
2023	Peugeot TotalEnergies	Hypercar	(United States) Gustavo Menezes	94	NC	5	9	9	11	7	8		67	5th
2023	Peugeot TotalEnergies	Hypercar	(Switzerland) Nico Müller	94	NC	5	9	9	11		8		67	5th
2023	Peugeot TotalEnergies	Hypercar	(Belgium) Stoffel Vandoorne	94						7			67	5th
2024	Peugeot TotalEnergies	Hypercar			QAT	IMO	SPA	LMN	SAP	COA	FUJ	BHR	57	6th
2024	Peugeot TotalEnergies	Hypercar	(Denmark) Mikkel Jensen	93	DSQ	9	10	12	8	12	4	3	57	6th
2024	Peugeot TotalEnergies	Hypercar	(Switzerland) Nico Müller	93	DSQ	9	10	12	8	12	4	3	57	6th
2024	Peugeot TotalEnergies	Hypercar	(France) Jean-Éric Vergne	93	DSQ	9		12	8	12	4	3	57	6th
2024	Peugeot TotalEnergies	Hypercar	(United Kingdom) Paul di Resta	94	15	15	14	11	16	Ret	8	Ret	57	6th
2024	Peugeot TotalEnergies	Hypercar	(France) Loïc Duval	94	15	15	14	11	16	Ret	8	Ret	57	6th
2024	Peugeot TotalEnergies	Hypercar	(Belgium) Stoffel Vandoorne	94	15	15		11	16	Ret	8	Ret	57	6th
2025	Peugeot TotalEnergies	Hypercar			QAT	IMO	SPA	LMN	SAO	COA	FUJ	BHR	84	7th
2025	Peugeot TotalEnergies	Hypercar	(Denmark) Mikkel Jensen	93	9	9	11	15	7	4	2	9	84	7th
2025	Peugeot TotalEnergies	Hypercar	(United Kingdom) Paul di Resta	93	9	9	11	15	7	4	2	9	84	7th
2025	Peugeot TotalEnergies	Hypercar	(France) Jean-Éric Vergne	93	9	9	11	15		4	2	9	84	7th
2025	Peugeot TotalEnergies	Hypercar	(France) Loïc Duval	94	12	12	Ret	11	6	3	10	10	84	7th
2025	Peugeot TotalEnergies	Hypercar	(Denmark) Malthe Jakobsen	94	12	12	Ret	11	6	3	10	10	84	7th
2025	Peugeot TotalEnergies	Hypercar	(Belgium) Stoffel Vandoorne	94	12	12	Ret	11		3	10		84	7th
2025	Peugeot TotalEnergies	Hypercar	(France) Théo Pourchaire	94								10	84	7th
2026	Peugeot TotalEnergies	Hypercar			IMO	SPA	LMN	SÃO	COA	FUJ	CAT	MNZ	42	7th
2026	Peugeot TotalEnergies	Hypercar	(New Zealand) Nick Cassidy	93	16	7	12	16	16	Ret	12	8	42	7th
2026	Peugeot TotalEnergies	Hypercar	(United Kingdom) Paul di Resta	93	16	7	12	16	16	Ret	12	8	42	7th
2026	Peugeot TotalEnergies	Hypercar	(Belgium) Stoffel Vandoorne	93	16	7	12	16	16	Ret			42	7th
2026	Peugeot TotalEnergies	Hypercar	(United Kingdom) Alex Quinn	93							12	8	42	7th
2026	Peugeot TotalEnergies	Hypercar	(France) Loïc Duval	94	12	**Ret**	11	14	10	6	13	4	42	7th
2026	Peugeot TotalEnergies	Hypercar	(Denmark) Malthe Jakobsen	94	12	**Ret**	11	14	10	6	13	4	42	7th
2026	Peugeot TotalEnergies	Hypercar	(France) Théo Pourchaire	94	12	**Ret**	11	14	10	6	13	4	42	7th
