= Le Mans Hypercar =

Type of sports prototype race car

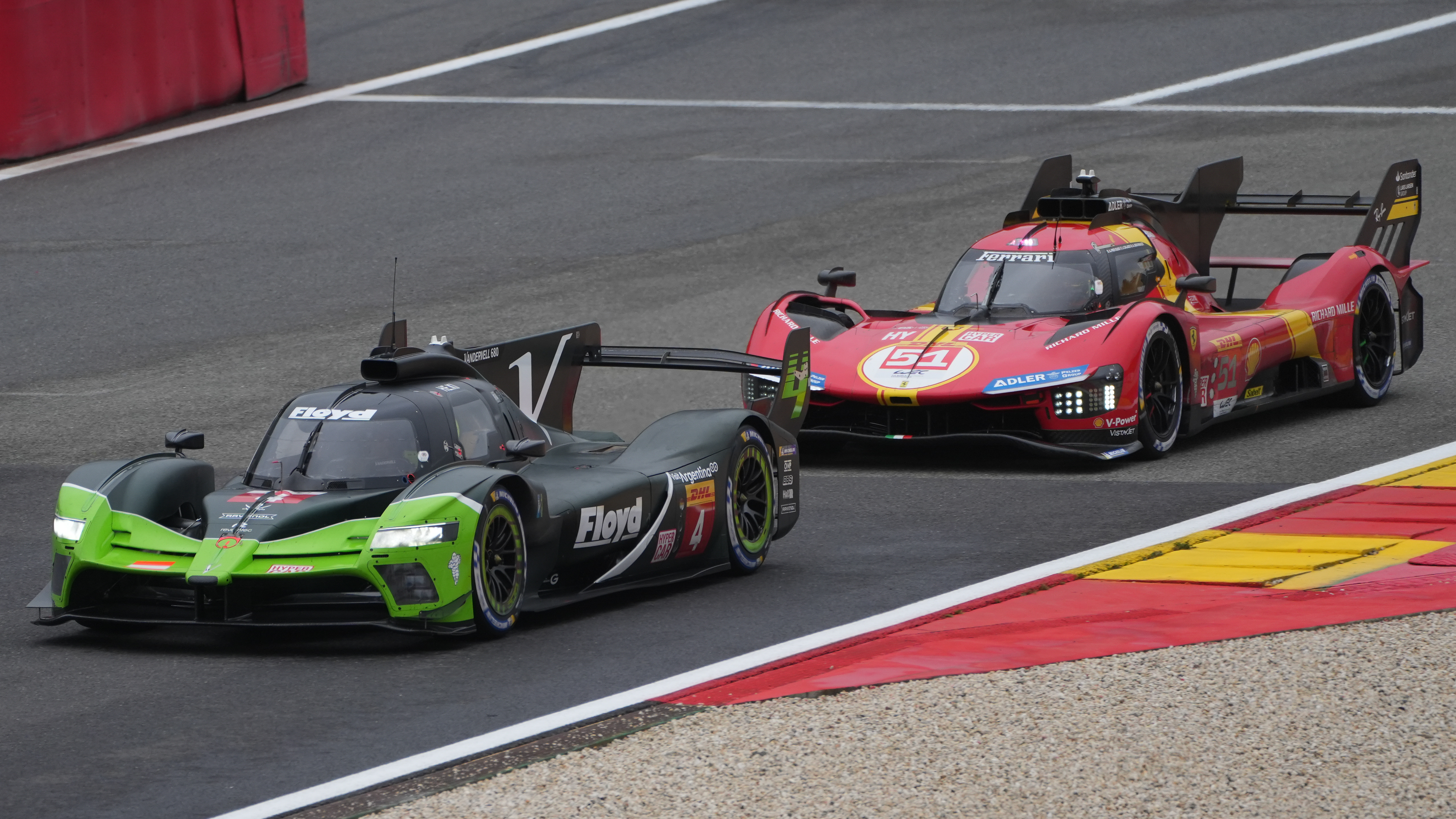
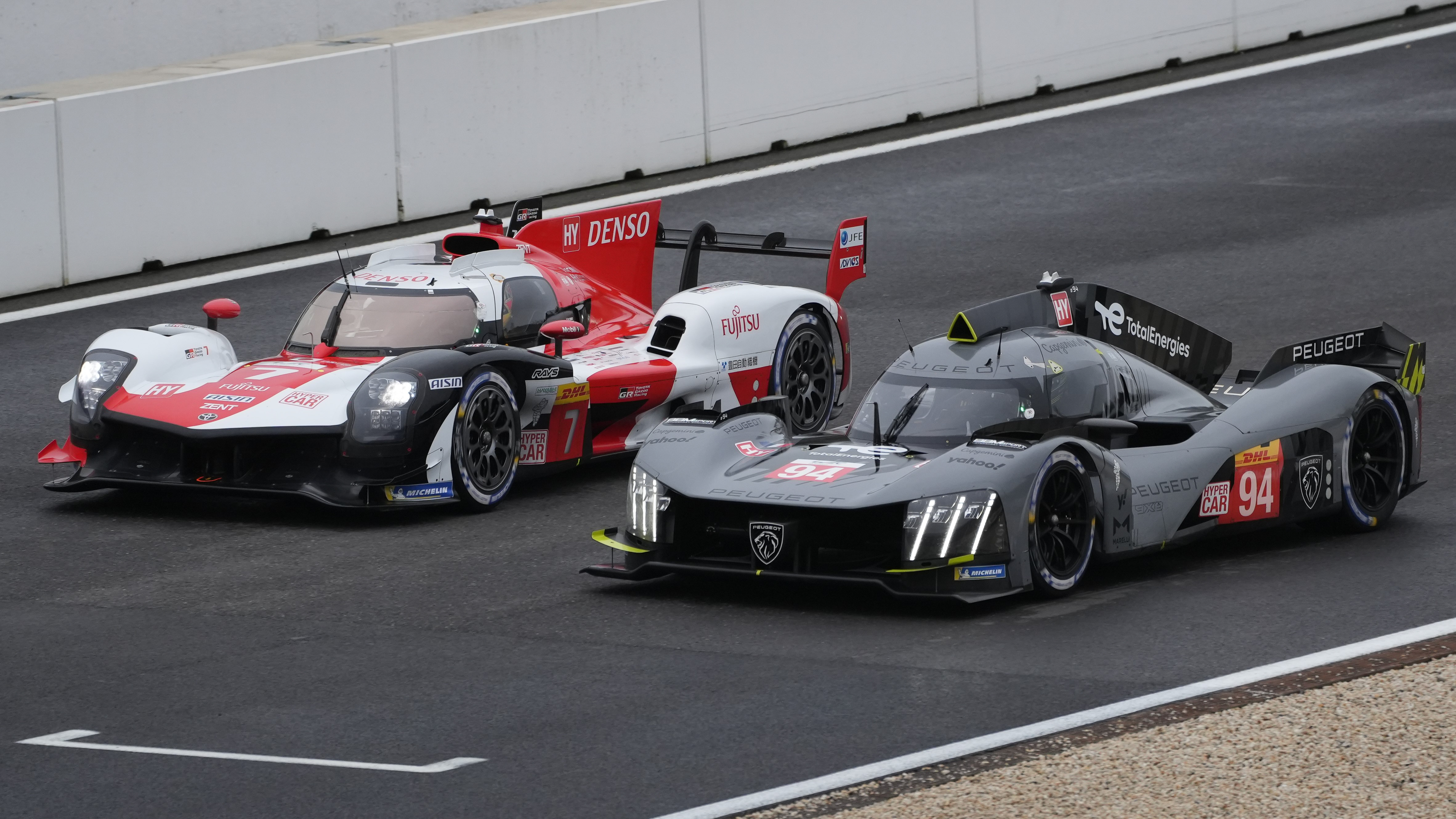
A group of cars at the Spa-Francorchamps, featuring four Hypercar manufacturers

A Le Mans Hypercar (LMH) is a type of sports prototype race car that competes alongside LMDh entries in the Hypercar class of the FIA World Endurance Championship. It also competes in the Grand Touring Prototype (GTP) class of the IMSA SportsCar Championship.

The Le Mans Hypercar regulations were created jointly by the Automobile Club de l'Ouest (ACO) and the Fédération Internationale de l'Automobile (FIA) as a successor to the Le Mans Prototype 1 (LMP1) from the 2021 season onwards.

== History ==
=== Demise of the LMP1 class ===
Following the successive exits of Audi and Porsche from the FIA World Endurance Championship at the end of the 2016 and 2017 seasons in the aftermath of the Volkswagen emissions scandal affecting the Volkswagen Group (parent company of both manufacturers), as well as spiralling costs in the LMP1 Hybrid sub-category, the ACO began a series of discussions aimed at reducing the costs of competition for the next generation of LMP1 rules.

Initially, a single, low-power hybrid system had been planned for the new LMP1 rules, with plans for a shared platform with IMSA. Representatives from the three organizations, as well as current and prospective manufacturers, were involved in talks for the proposed regulations, which would debut in the 2020–21 World Endurance Championship (WEC) season. At the time, there was an option for a customer hybrid powertrain for small-volume manufacturers and privateers, which could lead the regulations to replace those of the Daytona prototype International (DPi) in the top class of the WeatherTech SportsCar Championship in 2022; this allowed for the unification of top-level sports car racing, with teams and manufacturers being able to compete with the same car in the "triple crown" (24 hours of Daytona, 24 Hours of Le Mans, 12 Hours of Sebring) of endurance racing. These plans targeted significant cost reductions while maintaining the performance levels of the LMP1 prototypes. A renaming of the category was later suggested by FIA President Jean Todt.

=== Early concepts ===
In June 2018, ahead of the 2018 24 Hours of Le Mans, the FIA first confirmed that the new set of top-level prototype regulations would feature design concepts based on hypercars when introduced, with a summary of the new technical regulations being presented to the FIA World Motor Sport Council in Manila. At the time, Toyota, Ford, McLaren, Aston Martin, and Ferrari were reported to have participated in roundtable discussions with the championship organisers for the new regulations, with a significantly reduced target full-season budget in the region of 25 million euros—75% lower than existing budgets used by manufacturer teams.

At the 2018 24 Hours of Le Mans, the initial details of the new top class for the FIA World Endurance Championship were announced at the ACO's annual press conference, with the regulations set to be active for 5 seasons. Numerous aspects of the design for the new class would be kept open, with a free engine architecture and the freedom to run any number of cylinders with the choice of a turbocharged or naturally aspirated design. The cars would have an overall weight of 980 kg (2,160 lb) with a controlled weight distribution, alongside a defined maximum fuel flow, with controlled efficiency and other regulations to control developmental costs. Hybrid systems would feature an electric motor mounted on the front axle with a fixed performance of 200 kW (270 hp), giving the cars a four-wheel drive layout, while the engine's maximum performance target would be set at 520 kW (700 hp). Each car would have two seats, a larger cockpit than current LMP1 cars, a wider windscreen, and a roofline more consistent with road cars. Manufacturers would be required to make their hybrid systems available for privateer teams to lease at a cost cap, while any manufacturer or company would be able to design and build its own hybrid system, which would undergo homologation by the FIA and ACO. The cars would also be slower than their predecessors, with a target lap time of 3:20.

On 25 July 2018, Scuderia Cameron Glickenhaus became the first manufacturer to officially indicate its participation in the new rules, with the manufacturer releasing images of a prototype that it planned to race in the 24 Hours of Le Mans. The manufacturer would offer a limited run of 25 road-legal versions and one race version to fund its Le Mans program. By the end of 2018, apart from Glickenhaus, no other manufacturer had committed to the new regulations. Concerns were raised by several manufacturers about the tight timelines involved, which would leave manufacturers intending to commit from the first season of competition, with less than two years to design and build new cars upon gaining company board approval. On 21 October 2018, McLaren announced that it would not participate in the first year of the category, due to the tight timelines involved and the relatively fluid state of the regulations at that time.

=== Beginning of the Le Mans Hypercar class ===
On 5 December 2018, the FIA published the technical rulebook for the class, with the regulations mandating production-based powertrains. It was also decided that a minimum of 25 road cars fitted with the combustion engine and energy recovery system (ERS) of the race car would have to be produced by the end of a manufacturer's first season, with that amount rising to 100 by the end of its second season. This would mean that non-OEM racecar constructors, such as Oreca, Onroak Automotive, and Dallara, would not be permitted to build hypercars, while the previously proposed "off-the-shelf" hybrid solution was absent from the regulations. The regulations called for a total maximum power output of 785 hp (585 kW) drawn from the combustion and electric hybrid system, with the electric component restricted to a maximum output of 200 kW. There was speculation in the press about 950 hp figures, obtained by just adding up the ICE and electric power output. In reality, power units were always expected to follow a prescribed combined power curve, with a peak of 585 kW at 95% of engine speed. In addition, diesel power would be banned, and a 3 million euro ($3.4 million US) cost cap on the supply of ERS systems from manufacturers to customer teams was announced. ERS manufacturers would be prohibited from supplying a system to more than three competitors without the formal approval of the FIA. The minimum weight of the new-generation cars was raised from the initially stated 980 kg (2,160 lb) to 1,040 kg (2,290 lb), with a maximum length of 5,000 mm (200 in), while maximum cockpit width would increase to 2,000 mm (79 in).

On 7 March 2019, the FIA World Endurance Championship announced that it would adjust its criteria for the new regulations, with manufacturers now permitted to enter race cars derived from road-going hypercars, after several manufacturers expressed interest in a closer alignment between their production and race activities, citing both budgetary and platform availability concerns. Subsequently the target lap time of the new cars was increased from 3:20 to 3:30 and movable aerodynamic devices, originally planned to be allowed under the new regulations, were removed due to cost concerns.

On the Friday prior to the 2019 24 Hours of Le Mans (14 June 2019), the full technical regulations regarding the new class were unveiled at the race's press conference. The regulations were teamed with the announcement of Toyota Gazoo Racing and Aston Martin Racing committing to the category for its inaugural season, then-to-be the 2020–2021 WEC Season. Aston Martin confirmed the use of the Valkyrie road-going car as the spine of their hypercar, whilst Toyota hinted at the use of their GR Super Sport concept. The two manufacturers would join the supposed Glickenhaus team and ByKolles Racing for the first few races.

On 19 February 2020, Aston Martin announced that they would be postponing their Le Mans Hypercar project, as the announcement of the joint ACO-IMSA Le Mans Daytona h (LMDh) rules led the company to reconsider their plans on the project. In addition, the company planned to re-join Formula One in 2021 for the first time since the late 1950s as a factory-backed team.

On 11 May 2020, the FIA announced it had approved further changes to the LMH technical regulations, which would see a decrease in maximum power to 500 kW (670 hp), and minimum weight of the cars reducing from 1,100 kg (2,400 lb) to 1,030 kg (2,270 lb), identical to LMDh cars.

=== Debut and LMDh merge ===
In 2021, just a few days after Peugeot revealed their 9X8 Hypercar, the IMSA and the ACO announced that they would merge their respective sports prototype rulesets into one class. This unified prototype class is named differently in the FIA World Endurance Championship and IMSA SportsCar Championship: Hypercar and Grand Touring Prototype (GTP), respectively. This merge allows the Le Mans Hypercars to compete in the IMSA SportsCar Championship with LMDh cars, and LMH and LMDh cars to race in both North American and world championships together, a level of commonality between Europe and America not seen in top-level sportscar racing for several decades.

In 2025, it was announced that the Hypercar class would be allowed to participate in the Asian Le Mans Series with customer teams and Pro/Am lineups. This also meant that LMH vehicles would be eligible to compete in the AsLMS beginning with the 2026-27 season.

== Technical regulations ==
The frontal surface area of the car may not be below 1.6 m^{2}, while "as viewed from above, from the side, and from the front, the bodywork must not allow mechanical components to be seen, unless explicitly authorised by the present regulations, or if respecting the original car design." Movable aerodynamic elements are prohibited.

=== Powertrain ===
Engine design is free, with only four-stroke petrol engines being permitted for use. For production-based engines, the block and head castings must come from the base engine (but can be slightly altered via machining or addition of material), and the crankshaft may only be a maximum of 10% lighter, while valve angles, number of camshafts, and location of camshafts must also remain as they are fitted on the original engine.

For cars utilising an energy recovery hybrid system, the speed at which it can be deployed is set in the Balance of Performance table. The electrical DC power of the MGU-K must not exceed 200 kW, and with the exception of the pit lane, the MGU-K may only apply positive torque to the front wheels should the following conditions be met:

- If the speed of the car is equal or higher than the respective value set in the BoP table, when fitted with dry weather slick tires.
- If the speed of the car is equal or higher than the respective value set in the BoP table, when not fitted with dry weather slick tires.
- If the speed of the car is below the respective value set in the BoP table and stays below that value until the car comes to the pits.

=== Vehicle Specifications ===
Maximum length	5,000 mm (200 in)
Maximum width	2,000 mm (79 in)
Maximum wheelbase	3,150 mm (124 in)
Minimum frontal area	1.6 m^{2} (2,500 sq in)
Minimum weight	1,030 kg (2,270 lb)
Minimum engine weight	165 kg (364 lb)
Engine displacement	No limit
Maximum power output	500 kW (670 hp)
Maximum wheel diameter	710 mm (28 in)
Maximum wheel width	380 mm (15 in)
Minimum headlight height	400 mm (15.75 in) above the reference plane

== Manufacturers ==
Manufacturer	Model	Picture	Debut	Source
Toyota	GR010 Hybrid; TR010 Hybrid		2021 6 Hours of Spa-Francorchamps	
Glickenhaus	SCG 007 LMH		2021 8 Hours of Portimão	
Peugeot	9X8		2022 6 Hours of Monza	
Ferrari	499P		2023 1000 Miles of Sebring	
Vanwall	Vandervell 680		2023 1000 Miles of Sebring	
Isotta Fraschini	Tipo 6 LMH-C		2024 Qatar 1812 km	
Aston Martin	Valkyrie AMR-LMH		2025 Qatar 1812 km	

== See also ==
- Group 5
- Group 6
- Group C
- IMSA GTP
- Daytona Prototype
- Daytona Prototype International
