= Peugeot X6H engine =

Overview
- Manufacturer: Peugeot
- Production: 2022-present

Layout
- Configuration: 90° V6
- Displacement: 2.6 L (2,597 cc)
- Cylinder bore: 86 mm (3.4 in)
- Piston stroke: 74.5 mm (3 in)
- Cylinder block material: Aluminium alloy
- Cylinder head material: Aluminium alloy
- Valvetrain: 24-valve (four-valves per cylinder), DOHC

Combustion
- Turbocharger: Garrett twin-turbocharged
- Fuel system: Gasoline direct injection
- Fuel type: TotalEnergies "100% renewable" synthetic fuel
- Oil system: Dry sump

Output
- Power output: 500 kW (671 hp; 680 PS)

Dimensions
- Dry weight: 165 kg (364 lb)

The Peugeot X6H engine is twin-turbocharged, four-stroke, 2.6-liter, V6 racing engine, made by Peugeot Sport for use in their Peugeot 9X8 LMH race car, since 2022.

== Design ==
Peugeot Sport, developed the bespoke engine for their 2022 Peugeot 9X8 LMH. The 500 kW (670 hp) internal combustion engine component is mid-engine, longitudinally mounted with a front mounted, 200 kW (270 hp) motor-generator unit and battery. The battery was designed and developed, jointly, by Peugeot Sport and Saft, a subsidiary of TotalEnergies.

Before the second race of the 2024 FIA World Endurance Championship season, a revised 9X8 was unveiled. With the "Evo" package, the engine received updates to improve the reliability.

== Applications ==
- Peugeot 9X8

== See also ==
- List of PSA engines
