= 2023 6 Hours of Portimão =

Endurance race in Portugal

(Portugal) 2023 6 Hours of Portimão
Event information
- Round 2 of 7 in the 2023 FIA World Endurance Championship
- Date: 16 April 2023
- Location: Portimão
- Venue: Algarve International Circuit
- Duration: 6 Hours

Results
- Laps completed: 222
- Distance (km): 1032.966
- Distance (miles): 641.802
- Hypercar

Pole position
- Time: 1:30.171
- Team: Toyota Gazoo Racing

Winners
- Team: Toyota Gazoo Racing
- Drivers: (Switzerland) Sébastien Buemi (New Zealand) Brendon Hartley (Japan) Ryo Hirakawa
- LMP2

Winners
- Team: (United Kingdom) United Autosports
- Drivers: (Netherlands) Giedo van der Garde (United Kingdom) Oliver Jarvis (United States) Josh Pierson
- LMGTE Am

Winners
- Team: (United States) Corvette Racing
- Drivers: (Netherlands) Nicky Catsburg (United States) Ben Keating (Argentina) Nicolás Varrone

The 2023 6 Hours of Portimão was an endurance sports car racing event held at the Algarve International Circuit, at Algarve, Portugal, on 16 April 2023. It served as the second round of the 2023 FIA World Endurance Championship, and was the second running of the event as part of the championship.

== Background ==
The 6 Hours of Portimão was the first time since 2021 that Portimão returned to the World Endurance Championship calendar.

== Entry list ==
The provisional entry list was revealed on 6 March 2023. The entry list consisted of 11 Hypercar entries, 12 LMP2 entries and 14 LMGTE Am entries. There were no changes in entries compared to the Sebring entry list. There was one change for the entered drivers: António Félix da Costa replaced Will Stevens in the No. 48 Hertz Team Jota Oreca 07 LMP2 entry.

On a revised entry list revealed on 11 April 2023, Project 1 – AO replaced their drivers P.J. Hyett and Gunnar Jeannette with Miguel Ramos and Guilherme Oliveira, respectively. Both Hyett and Jeannette had duties in the Porsche Carrera Cup North America during the weekend. Other changes included Juan Manuel Correa taking over Andrea Caldarelli's seat in the No. 9 Prema Racing LMP2 machine. At United Autosports, Ben Hanley subbed for Filipe Albuquerque and Giedo van der Garde subbed for Tom Blomqvist in the No. 22 and No. 23 LMP2 machines, respectively, since both Albuquerque and Blomqvist drove in the GTP class during IMSA's 2023 Grand Prix of Long Beach.

== Schedule ==
Date	Time (local: WEST)	Event
Friday, 14 April	10:30	Free Practice 1
Friday, 14 April	15:30	Free Practice 2
Saturday, 15 April	11:15	Free Practice 3
Saturday, 15 April	15:30	Qualifying - LMGTE Am
Saturday, 15 April	15:55	Qualifying - LMP2
Saturday, 15 April	16:20	Qualifying - Hypercar
Sunday, 16 April	12:00	Race

== Free practice ==
- Only the fastest car in each class is shown.

Free Practice 1	Class	No.	Entrant	Driver	Time
Free Practice 1	Hypercar	8	(Japan) Toyota Gazoo Racing	(Switzerland) Sébastien Buemi	1:32.792
Free Practice 1	LMP2	63	(Italy) Prema Racing	(Italy) Mirko Bortolotti	1:34.542
Free Practice 1	LMGTE Am	57	(Switzerland) Kessel Racing	(Brazil) Daniel Serra	1:41.341
Free Practice 2	Class	No.	Entrant	Driver	Time
Free Practice 2	Hypercar	7	(Japan) Toyota Gazoo Racing	(Japan) Kamui Kobayashi	1:32.155
Free Practice 2	LMP2	10	(United Kingdom) Vector Sport	(France) Gabriel Aubry	1:34.609
Free Practice 2	LMGTE Am	57	(Switzerland) Kessel Racing	(Brazil) Daniel Serra	1:41.209
Free Practice 3	Class	No.	Entrant	Driver	Time
Free Practice 3	Hypercar	8	(Japan) Toyota Gazoo Racing	(New Zealand) Brendon Hartley	1:31.795
Free Practice 3	LMP2	10	(United Kingdom) Vector Sport	(France) Gabriel Aubry	1:34.265
Free Practice 3	LMGTE Am	54	(Italy) AF Corse	(Italy) Davide Rigon	1:40.426

== Qualifying ==
Pole position winners in each class are marked in bold.

Pos	Class	No.	Team	Time	Gap	Grid
1	**Hypercar**	**8**	**(Japan) Toyota Gazoo Racing**	**1:30.171**	-	**1**
2	Hypercar	7	(Japan) Toyota Gazoo Racing	1:30.444	+0.273	2
3	Hypercar	50	(Italy) Ferrari AF Corse	1:31.596	+1.425	3
4	Hypercar	51	(Italy) Ferrari AF Corse	1:31.923	+1.752	4
5	Hypercar	6	(Germany) Porsche Penske Motorsport	1:32.404	+2.233	5
6	Hypercar	94	(France) Peugeot TotalEnergies	1:32.517	+2.346	6
7	Hypercar	5	(Germany) Porsche Penske Motorsport	1:32.560	+2.389	7
8	Hypercar	2	(United States) Cadillac Racing	1:32.582	+2.411	8
9	Hypercar	93	(France) Peugeot TotalEnergies	1:32.703	+2.532	9
10	Hypercar	708	(United States) Glickenhaus Racing	1:33.343	+3.172	10
11	Hypercar	4	(Austria) Floyd Vanwall Racing Team	1:33.836	+3.665	11
12	**LMP2**	**63**	**(Italy) Prema Racing**	**1:34.303**	**+4.132**	**12**
13	LMP2	10	(United Kingdom) Vector Sport	1:34.304	+4.133	13
14	LMP2	22	(United Kingdom) United Autosports	1:34.451	+4.280	17 (Note: The No. 22 car received a three-place grid penalty after impeding the No. 9 car.)
15	LMP2	48	(United Kingdom) Hertz Team Jota	1:34.493	+4.322	14
16	LMP2	34	(Poland) Inter Europol Competition	1:34.586	+4.415	15
17	LMP2	23	(United Kingdom) United Autosports	1:34.590	+4.419	16
18	LMP2	31	(Belgium) Team WRT	1:34.618	+4.447	18
19	LMP2	9	(Italy) Prema Racing	1:34.770	+4.599	19
20	LMP2	41	(Belgium) Team WRT	1:34.776	+4.605	20
21	LMP2	35	(France) Alpine Elf Team	1:34.996	+4.825	21
22	LMP2	36	(France) Alpine Elf Team	1:35.238	+5.067	22
23	LMP2	28	(United Kingdom) Jota	1:35.361	+5.190	23
24	**LMGTE Am**	**33**	**(United States) Corvette Racing**	**1:41.362**	**+11.191**	**24**
25	LMGTE Am	85	(Italy) Iron Dames	1:41.579	+11.408	25
26	LMGTE Am	21	(Italy) AF Corse	1:41.628	+11.457	26
27	LMGTE Am	54	(Italy) AF Corse	1:41.899	+11.728	27
28	LMGTE Am	25	(Oman) ORT by TF	1:41.904	+11.733	28
29	LMGTE Am	83	(Italy) Richard Mille AF Corse	1:41.934	+11.763	29
30	LMGTE Am	57	(Switzerland) Kessel Racing	1:42.014	+11.843	30
31	LMGTE Am	56	(Germany) Project 1 – AO	1:42.024	+11.853	31
32	LMGTE Am	77	(Germany) Dempsey-Proton Racing	1:42.105	+11.934	32
33	LMGTE Am	88	(Germany) Proton Competition	1:42.198	+12.027	33
34	LMGTE Am	777	(Japan) D'Station Racing	1:43.035	+12.864	34
35	LMGTE Am	98	(Canada) Northwest AMR	1:43.207	+13.036	35
36	LMGTE Am	86	(United Kingdom) GR Racing	1:43.273	+13.102	36
37	LMGTE Am	60	(Italy) Iron Lynx	1:43.528	+13.357	37

== Race ==
=== Race result ===
The minimum number of laps for classification (70% of overall winning car's distance) was 155 laps. Class winners are in bold and ‡.

Final race classification
Pos	Class	No	Team	Drivers	Chassis	Tyre	Laps	Time/Retired
Pos	Class	No	Team	Drivers	Engine	Tyre	Laps	Time/Retired
1	**Hypercar**	**8**	**(Japan) Toyota Gazoo Racing**	**(Switzerland) Sébastien Buemi (New Zealand) Brendon Hartley (Japan) Ryo Hirakawa**	**Toyota GR010 Hybrid**	M	**222**	**6:01:26.343‡**
1	**Hypercar**	**8**	**(Japan) Toyota Gazoo Racing**	**(Switzerland) Sébastien Buemi (New Zealand) Brendon Hartley (Japan) Ryo Hirakawa**	**Toyota H8909 3.5 L Turbo V6**	M	**222**	**6:01:26.343‡**
2	Hypercar	50	(Italy) Ferrari AF Corse	(Italy) Antonio Fuoco (Spain) Miguel Molina (Denmark) Nicklas Nielsen	Ferrari 499P	M	221	+1 Lap
2	Hypercar	50	(Italy) Ferrari AF Corse	(Italy) Antonio Fuoco (Spain) Miguel Molina (Denmark) Nicklas Nielsen	Ferrari F163 3.0 L Turbo V6	M	221	+1 Lap
3	Hypercar	6	(Germany) Porsche Penske Motorsport	(France) Kévin Estre (Germany) André Lotterer (Belgium) Laurens Vanthoor	Porsche 963	M	221	+1 Lap
3	Hypercar	6	(Germany) Porsche Penske Motorsport	(France) Kévin Estre (Germany) André Lotterer (Belgium) Laurens Vanthoor	Porsche 9RD 4.6 L Turbo V8	M	221	+1 Lap
4	Hypercar	2	(United States) Cadillac Racing	(New Zealand) Earl Bamber (United Kingdom) Alex Lynn (United Kingdom) Richard Westbrook	Cadillac V-Series.R	M	220	+2 Laps
4	Hypercar	2	(United States) Cadillac Racing	(New Zealand) Earl Bamber (United Kingdom) Alex Lynn (United Kingdom) Richard Westbrook	Cadillac LMC55R 5.5 L V8	M	220	+2 Laps
5	Hypercar	94	(France) Peugeot TotalEnergies	(France) Loïc Duval (United States) Gustavo Menezes (Switzerland) Nico Müller	Peugeot 9X8	M	220	+2 Laps
5	Hypercar	94	(France) Peugeot TotalEnergies	(France) Loïc Duval (United States) Gustavo Menezes (Switzerland) Nico Müller	Peugeot X6H 2.6 L Turbo V6	M	220	+2 Laps
6	Hypercar	51	(Italy) Ferrari AF Corse	(United Kingdom) James Calado (Italy) Antonio Giovinazzi (Italy) Alessandro Pier Guidi	Ferrari 499P	M	219	+3 Laps
6	Hypercar	51	(Italy) Ferrari AF Corse	(United Kingdom) James Calado (Italy) Antonio Giovinazzi (Italy) Alessandro Pier Guidi	Ferrari F163 3.0 L Turbo V6	M	219	+3 Laps
7	Hypercar	93	(France) Peugeot TotalEnergies	(Denmark) Mikkel Jensen (United Kingdom) Paul di Resta (France) Jean-Éric Vergne	Peugeot 9X8	M	219	+3 Laps
7	Hypercar	93	(France) Peugeot TotalEnergies	(Denmark) Mikkel Jensen (United Kingdom) Paul di Resta (France) Jean-Éric Vergne	Peugeot X6H 2.6 L Turbo V6	M	219	+3 Laps
8	Hypercar	708	(United States) Glickenhaus Racing	(Australia) Ryan Briscoe (France) Romain Dumas (France) Olivier Pla	Glickenhaus SCG 007 LMH	M	217	+5 Laps
8	Hypercar	708	(United States) Glickenhaus Racing	(Australia) Ryan Briscoe (France) Romain Dumas (France) Olivier Pla	Glickenhaus P21 3.5 L Turbo V8	M	217	+5 Laps
9	Hypercar	7	(Japan) Toyota Gazoo Racing	(United Kingdom) Mike Conway (Japan) Kamui Kobayashi (Argentina) José María López	Toyota GR010 Hybrid	M	215	+7 Laps
9	Hypercar	7	(Japan) Toyota Gazoo Racing	(United Kingdom) Mike Conway (Japan) Kamui Kobayashi (Argentina) José María López	Toyota H8909 3.5 L Turbo V6	M	215	+7 Laps
10	**LMP2**	**23**	**(United Kingdom) United Autosports**	**(Netherlands) Giedo van der Garde (United Kingdom) Oliver Jarvis (United States) Josh Pierson**	**Oreca 07**	G	**215**	**+7 Laps‡**
10	**LMP2**	**23**	**(United Kingdom) United Autosports**	**(Netherlands) Giedo van der Garde (United Kingdom) Oliver Jarvis (United States) Josh Pierson**	**Gibson GK428 4.2 L V8**	G	**215**	**+7 Laps‡**
11	LMP2	22	(United Kingdom) United Autosports	(United Kingdom) Ben Hanley (United Kingdom) Philip Hanson (United Kingdom) Frederick Lubin	Oreca 07	G	215	+7 Laps
11	LMP2	22	(United Kingdom) United Autosports	(United Kingdom) Ben Hanley (United Kingdom) Philip Hanson (United Kingdom) Frederick Lubin	Gibson GK428 4.2 L V8	G	215	+7 Laps
12	LMP2	41	(Belgium) Team WRT	(Angola) Rui Andrade (Switzerland) Louis Delétraz (Poland) Robert Kubica	Oreca 07	G	215	+7 Laps
12	LMP2	41	(Belgium) Team WRT	(Angola) Rui Andrade (Switzerland) Louis Delétraz (Poland) Robert Kubica	Gibson GK428 4.2 L V8	G	215	+7 Laps
13	LMP2	63	(Italy) Prema Racing	(Italy) Mirko Bortolotti; Daniil Kvyat (France) Doriane Pin	Oreca 07	G	215	+7 Laps
13	LMP2	63	(Italy) Prema Racing	(Italy) Mirko Bortolotti; Daniil Kvyat (France) Doriane Pin	Gibson GK428 4.2 L V8	G	215	+7 Laps
14	LMP2	48	(United Kingdom) Hertz Team Jota	(Germany) David Beckmann (Portugal) António Félix da Costa (China) Yifei Ye	Oreca 07	G	215	+7 Laps
14	LMP2	48	(United Kingdom) Hertz Team Jota	(Germany) David Beckmann (Portugal) António Félix da Costa (China) Yifei Ye	Gibson GK428 4.2 L V8	G	215	+7 Laps
15	LMP2	9	(Italy) Prema Racing	(United States) Juan Manuel Correa (Romania) Filip Ugran (Netherlands) Bent Viscaal	Oreca 07	G	215	+7 Laps
15	LMP2	9	(Italy) Prema Racing	(United States) Juan Manuel Correa (Romania) Filip Ugran (Netherlands) Bent Viscaal	Gibson GK428 4.2 L V8	G	215	+7 Laps
16	LMP2	31	(Belgium) Team WRT	(Netherlands) Robin Frijns (Indonesia) Sean Gelael (Austria) Ferdinand Habsburg	Oreca 07	G	215	+7 Laps
16	LMP2	31	(Belgium) Team WRT	(Netherlands) Robin Frijns (Indonesia) Sean Gelael (Austria) Ferdinand Habsburg	Gibson GK428 4.2 L V8	G	215	+7 Laps
17	LMP2	28	(United Kingdom) Jota	(Brazil) Pietro Fittipaldi (Denmark) David Heinemeier Hansson (Denmark) Oliver Rasmussen	Oreca 07	G	215	+7 Laps
17	LMP2	28	(United Kingdom) Jota	(Brazil) Pietro Fittipaldi (Denmark) David Heinemeier Hansson (Denmark) Oliver Rasmussen	Gibson GK428 4.2 L V8	G	215	+7 Laps
18	LMP2	36	(France) Alpine Elf Team	(France) Julien Canal (France) Charles Milesi (France) Matthieu Vaxivière	Oreca 07	G	215	+7 Laps
18	LMP2	36	(France) Alpine Elf Team	(France) Julien Canal (France) Charles Milesi (France) Matthieu Vaxivière	Gibson GK428 4.2 L V8	G	215	+7 Laps
19	LMP2	34	(Poland) Inter Europol Competition	(Spain) Albert Costa (Switzerland) Fabio Scherer (Poland) Jakub Śmiechowski	Oreca 07	G	214	+8 Laps
19	LMP2	34	(Poland) Inter Europol Competition	(Spain) Albert Costa (Switzerland) Fabio Scherer (Poland) Jakub Śmiechowski	Gibson GK428 4.2 L V8	G	214	+8 Laps
20	LMP2	35	(France) Alpine Elf Team	(United Kingdom) Olli Caldwell (Brazil) André Negrão (Mexico) Memo Rojas	Oreca 07	G	213	+9 Laps
20	LMP2	35	(France) Alpine Elf Team	(United Kingdom) Olli Caldwell (Brazil) André Negrão (Mexico) Memo Rojas	Gibson GK428 4.2 L V8	G	213	+9 Laps
21	**LMGTE Am**	**33**	**(United States) Corvette Racing**	**(Netherlands) Nicky Catsburg (United States) Ben Keating (Argentina) Nicolás Varrone**	**Chevrolet Corvette C8.R**	M	**206**	**+16 Laps‡**
21	**LMGTE Am**	**33**	**(United States) Corvette Racing**	**(Netherlands) Nicky Catsburg (United States) Ben Keating (Argentina) Nicolás Varrone**	**Chevrolet 5.5 L V8**	M	**206**	**+16 Laps‡**
22	LMGTE Am	83	(Italy) Richard Mille AF Corse	(Argentina) Luis Pérez Companc (Italy) Alessio Rovera (France) Lilou Wadoux	Ferrari 488 GTE Evo	M	206	+16 Laps
22	LMGTE Am	83	(Italy) Richard Mille AF Corse	(Argentina) Luis Pérez Companc (Italy) Alessio Rovera (France) Lilou Wadoux	Ferrari F154CB 3.9 L Turbo V8	M	206	+16 Laps
23	LMGTE Am	85	(Italy) Iron Dames	(Belgium) Sarah Bovy (Switzerland) Rahel Frey (Denmark) Michelle Gatting	Porsche 911 RSR-19	M	206	+16 Laps
23	LMGTE Am	85	(Italy) Iron Dames	(Belgium) Sarah Bovy (Switzerland) Rahel Frey (Denmark) Michelle Gatting	Porsche 4.2 L Flat-6	M	206	+16 Laps
24	LMGTE Am	54	(Italy) AF Corse	(Italy) Francesco Castellacci (Switzerland) Thomas Flohr (Italy) Davide Rigon	Ferrari 488 GTE Evo	M	206	+16 Laps
24	LMGTE Am	54	(Italy) AF Corse	(Italy) Francesco Castellacci (Switzerland) Thomas Flohr (Italy) Davide Rigon	Ferrari F154CB 3.9 L Turbo V8	M	206	+16 Laps
25	LMGTE Am	21	(Italy) AF Corse	(Italy) Diego Alessi (United States) Simon Mann (Belgium) Ulysse de Pauw	Ferrari 488 GTE Evo	M	206	+16 Laps
25	LMGTE Am	21	(Italy) AF Corse	(Italy) Diego Alessi (United States) Simon Mann (Belgium) Ulysse de Pauw	Ferrari F154CB 3.9 L Turbo V8	M	206	+16 Laps
26	LMGTE Am	56	(Germany) Project 1 – AO	(Italy) Matteo Cairoli (Portugal) Guilherme Oliveira (Portugal) Miguel Ramos	Porsche 911 RSR-19	M	205	+17 Laps
26	LMGTE Am	56	(Germany) Project 1 – AO	(Italy) Matteo Cairoli (Portugal) Guilherme Oliveira (Portugal) Miguel Ramos	Porsche 4.2 L Flat-6	M	205	+17 Laps
27	LMGTE Am	77	(Germany) Dempsey-Proton Racing	(France) Julien Andlauer (Germany) Christian Ried (Denmark) Mikkel O. Pedersen	Porsche 911 RSR-19	M	205	+17 Laps
27	LMGTE Am	77	(Germany) Dempsey-Proton Racing	(France) Julien Andlauer (Germany) Christian Ried (Denmark) Mikkel O. Pedersen	Porsche 4.2 L Flat-6	M	205	+17 Laps
28	LMGTE Am	25	(Oman) ORT by TF	(Oman) Ahmad Al Harthy (United States) Michael Dinan (Republic of Ireland) Charlie Eastwood	Aston Martin Vantage AMR	M	205	+17 Laps
28	LMGTE Am	25	(Oman) ORT by TF	(Oman) Ahmad Al Harthy (United States) Michael Dinan (Republic of Ireland) Charlie Eastwood	Aston Martin 4.0 L Turbo V8	M	205	+17 Laps
29	LMGTE Am	88	(Germany) Proton Competition	(United States) Ryan Hardwick (Canada) Zacharie Robichon (United Kingdom) Harry Tincknell	Porsche 911 RSR-19	M	204	+18 Laps
29	LMGTE Am	88	(Germany) Proton Competition	(United States) Ryan Hardwick (Canada) Zacharie Robichon (United Kingdom) Harry Tincknell	Porsche 4.2 L Flat-6	M	204	+18 Laps
30	LMGTE Am	57	(Switzerland) Kessel Racing	(United States) Scott Huffaker (Japan) Takeshi Kimura (Brazil) Daniel Serra	Ferrari 488 GTE Evo	M	204	+18 Laps
30	LMGTE Am	57	(Switzerland) Kessel Racing	(United States) Scott Huffaker (Japan) Takeshi Kimura (Brazil) Daniel Serra	Ferrari F154CB 3.9 L Turbo V8	M	204	+18 Laps
31	LMGTE Am	86	(United Kingdom) GR Racing	(United Kingdom) Ben Barker (Italy) Riccardo Pera (United Kingdom) Michael Wainwright	Porsche 911 RSR-19	M	204	+18 Laps
31	LMGTE Am	86	(United Kingdom) GR Racing	(United Kingdom) Ben Barker (Italy) Riccardo Pera (United Kingdom) Michael Wainwright	Porsche 4.2 L Flat-6	M	204	+18 Laps
32	LMGTE Am	60	(Italy) Iron Lynx	(Italy) Matteo Cressoni (Belgium) Alessio Picariello (Italy) Claudio Schiavoni	Porsche 911 RSR-19	M	203	+19 Laps
32	LMGTE Am	60	(Italy) Iron Lynx	(Italy) Matteo Cressoni (Belgium) Alessio Picariello (Italy) Claudio Schiavoni	Porsche 4.2 L Flat-6	M	203	+19 Laps
33	LMGTE Am	98	(Canada) Northwest AMR	(Canada) Paul Dalla Lana (Zimbabwe) Axcil Jefferies (Denmark) Nicki Thiim	Aston Martin Vantage AMR	M	202	+20 Laps
33	LMGTE Am	98	(Canada) Northwest AMR	(Canada) Paul Dalla Lana (Zimbabwe) Axcil Jefferies (Denmark) Nicki Thiim	Aston Martin 4.0 L Turbo V8	M	202	+20 Laps
34	LMP2	10	(United Kingdom) Vector Sport	(France) Gabriel Aubry (Republic of Ireland) Ryan Cullen (Liechtenstein) Matthias Kaiser	Oreca 07	G	193	+29 Laps
34	LMP2	10	(United Kingdom) Vector Sport	(France) Gabriel Aubry (Republic of Ireland) Ryan Cullen (Liechtenstein) Matthias Kaiser	Gibson GK428 4.2 L V8	G	193	+29 Laps
35	Hypercar	5	(Germany) Porsche Penske Motorsport	(United States) Dane Cameron (Denmark) Michael Christensen (France) Frédéric Makowiecki	Porsche 963	M	189	+33 Laps
35	Hypercar	5	(Germany) Porsche Penske Motorsport	(United States) Dane Cameron (Denmark) Michael Christensen (France) Frédéric Makowiecki	Porsche 9RD 4.6 L Turbo V8	M	189	+33 Laps
Ret	Hypercar	4	(Austria) Floyd Vanwall Racing Team	(France) Tom Dillmann (Argentina) Esteban Guerrieri (Canada) Jacques Villeneuve	Vanwall Vandervell 680	M	174	Brakes
Ret	Hypercar	4	(Austria) Floyd Vanwall Racing Team	(France) Tom Dillmann (Argentina) Esteban Guerrieri (Canada) Jacques Villeneuve	Gibson GL458 4.5 L V8	M	174	Brakes
Ret	LMGTE Am	777	(Japan) D'Station Racing	(Japan) Tomonobu Fujii (Japan) Satoshi Hoshino (United Kingdom) Casper Stevenson	Aston Martin Vantage AMR	M	42	Mechanical
Ret	LMGTE Am	777	(Japan) D'Station Racing	(Japan) Tomonobu Fujii (Japan) Satoshi Hoshino (United Kingdom) Casper Stevenson	Aston Martin 4.0 L Turbo V8	M	42	Mechanical

Tyre manufacturers
Key
Symbol	Tyre manufacturer
**G**	Goodyear
**M**	Michelin

== Standings after the race ==
2023 Hypercar World Endurance Drivers' Championship

Pos	+/-	Driver	Points
1	1	(Switzerland) Sébastien Buemi (New Zealand) Brendon Hartley (Japan) Ryō Hirakawa	53
2	1	(Italy) Antonio Fuoco (Spain) Miguel Molina (Denmark) Nicklas Nielsen	42
3	2	(United Kingdom) Mike Conway (Japan) Kamui Kobayashi (Argentina) José María López	40
4		(New Zealand) Earl Bamber (United Kingdom) Alex Lynn (United Kingdom) Richard Westbrook	30
5	1	(France) Kévin Estre (Germany) André Lotterer (Belgium) Laurens Vanthoor	27

2023 Hypercar World Endurance Manufacturers' Championship

Pos	+/-	Manufacturer	Points
1		(Japan) Toyota	64
2		(Italy) Ferrari	42
3	1	(Germany) Porsche	30
4	1	(United States) Cadillac	30
5	1	(France) Peugeot	13

2023 FIA Endurance Trophy for LMP2 Drivers

Pos	+/-	Drivers	Points
1		(United Kingdom) Philip Hanson (United Kingdom) Frederick Lubin	56
2		(Italy) Mirko Bortolotti; Daniil Kvyat (France) Doriane Pin	40
3	2	(Portugal) Filipe Albuquerque	38
4		(Angola) Rui Andrade (Switzerland) Louis Delétraz (Poland) Robert Kubica	33
5	5	(United Kingdom) Oliver Jarvis (United States) Josh Pierson	26

2023 FIA Endurance Trophy for LMP2 Teams

Pos	+/-	No.	Team	Points
1		22	(United Kingdom) United Autosports	56
2		63	(Italy) Prema Racing	40
3	1	41	(Belgium) Team WRT	33
4	6	23	(United Kingdom) United Autosports	26
5	2	34	(Poland) Inter Europol Competition	25

2023 FIA Endurance Trophy for LMGTE Am Drivers

Pos	+/-	Drivers	Points
1		(Netherlands) Nicky Catsburg (United States) Ben Keating (Argentina) Nicolás Varrone	64
2		(France) Julien Andlauer (Germany) Christian Ried (Denmark) Mikkel O. Pedersen	33
3	1	(United States) Simon Mann (Belgium) Ulysse de Pauw	28
4	1	(Italy) Francesco Castellacci (Switzerland) Thomas Flohr (Italy) Davide Rigon	27
5	2	(United States) Scott Huffaker (Japan) Takeshi Himura (Brazil) Daniel Serra	24

2023 FIA Endurance Trophy for LMGTE Am Teams

Pos	+/-	No.	Team	Points
1		33	(United States) Corvette Racing	64
2		77	(Germany) Dempsey-Proton Racing	33
3	1	21	(Italy) AF Corse	28
4	1	54	(Italy) AF Corse	27
5	2	57	(Switzerland) Kessel Racing	24

- Note: Only the top five positions are included for all championship standings.

== Notes ==
FIA World Endurance Championship
Previous race: 1000 Miles of Sebring	2023 season	Next race: 6 Hours of Spa-Francorchamps
