= 2023 6 Hours of Monza =

Endurance sports car racing event in Italy

Coordinates: 45°36′56″N 9°16′52″E

(Italy) 2023 6 Hours of Monza
Event information
- Round 5 of 7 in the 2023 FIA World Endurance Championship
- Date: 10 July 2023
- Location: Monza
- Venue: Autodromo Nazionale di Monza
- Duration: 6 Hours

Results
- Laps completed: 200
- Distance (km): 1158.6
- Distance (miles): 720
- Hypercar

Pole position
- Time: 1:35.358
- Team: (Japan) Toyota Gazoo Racing

Winners
- Team: (Japan) Toyota Gazoo Racing
- Drivers: (United Kingdom) Mike Conway (Japan) Kamui Kobayashi (Argentina) José María López
- LMP2

Winners
- Team: (United Kingdom) Jota
- Drivers: (Brazil) Pietro Fittipaldi (Denmark) David Heinemeier Hansson (Denmark) Oliver Rasmussen
- LMGTE Am

Winners
- Team: (Germany) Dempsey-Proton Racing
- Drivers: (France) Julien Andlauer (Germany) Christian Ried (Denmark) Mikkel O. Pedersen

The 2023 6 Hours of Monza was an endurance sports car racing event held at the Autodromo Nazionale di Monza, Monza, Italy on 9 July 2023. It was the fifth round of the 2023 FIA World Endurance Championship, and was the third running of the event as part of the championship.

== Background ==
The provisional calendar for the season was revealed in September 2022. The Monza event returned to the calendar for the third consecutive year.

== Entry list ==
The entry list was revealed on 28 June 2023. The entry list consists of 13 Hypercar entries, 11 LMP2 entries, and 12 LMGTE Am entries. In Hypercar, the No. 99 Proton Competition Porsche 963 entered with their customer car for the first team this season, bringing the total customer teams up to two. In the No. 4 Floyd Vanwall Racing Team entry, João Paulo de Oliveira replaced Tom Dillmann. Furthermore, Nathanaël Berthon replaced Ryan Briscoe in the No. 708 Glickenhaus Racing entry.
In LMP2, Andrea Caldarelli returned to the No. 9 Prema Racing team after missing Le Mans. Furthermore, Mathias Beche replaced Mirko Bortolotti at the No. 63 Prema Racing team. At United Autosports, Ben Hanley and Giedo van der Garde replaced Filipe Albuquerque and Tom Blomqvist at the No. 22 and No. 23 cars, respectively, due to Albuquerque and Blomqvist driving at the IMSA race this weekend.
In LMGTE Am, the No. 88 Proton Competition and No. 98 NorthWest AMR machines were absent. Furthermore, Efrin Castro made his debut in the WEC with Team Project 1. Kei Cozzolino replaced Daniel Serra at the No. 57 Kessel Racing team.

== Schedule ==
Date	Time (local: CEST)	Event
Friday, 7 July	11:30	Free Practice 1
Friday, 7 July	16:40	Free Practice 2
Saturday, 8 July	10:45	Free Practice 3
Saturday, 8 July	14:40	Qualifying - LMGTE Am
Saturday, 8 July	15:05	Qualifying - LMP2
Saturday, 8 July	15:30	Qualifying - Hypercar
Sunday, 9 July	12:30	Race

== Free practice ==
- Only the fastest car in each class is shown.

Free Practice 1	Class	No.	Entrant	Driver	Time
Free Practice 1	Hypercar	51	(Italy) Ferrari AF Corse	(Italy) Alessandro Pier Guidi	1:37.533
Free Practice 1	LMP2	41	(Belgium) Team WRT	(Poland) Robert Kubica	1:40.356
Free Practice 1	LMGTE Am	54	(Switzerland) AF Corse	(Italy) Davide Rigon	1:47.538
Free Practice 2	Class	No.	Entrant	Driver	Time
Free Practice 2	Hypercar	7	(Japan) Toyota Gazoo Racing	(Japan) Kamui Kobayashi	1:36.363
Free Practice 2	LMP2	41	(Belgium) Team WRT	(Poland) Robert Kubica	1:39.955
Free Practice 2	LMGTE Am	60	(Italy) Iron Lynx	(Belgium) Alessio Picariello	1:46.973
Free Practice 3	Class	No.	Entrant	Driver	Time
Free Practice 3	Hypercar	93	(France) Peugeot TotalEnergies	(France) Jean-Éric Vergne	1:35.878
Free Practice 3	LMP2	28	(United Kingdom) Jota	(Brazil) Pietro Fittipaldi	1:39.621
Free Practice 3	LMGTE Am	56	(Germany) Project 1 – AO	(Italy) Matteo Cairoli	1:46.762

== Qualifying ==
Pole position winners in each class are marked in bold.

Pos	Class	No.	Team	Time	Gap	Grid
1	**Hypercar**	**7**	**(Japan) Toyota Gazoo Racing**	**1:35.358**	-	**1**
2	Hypercar	50	(Italy) Ferrari AF Corse	1:35.375	+0.017	2
3	Hypercar	8	(Japan) Toyota Gazoo Racing	1:35.460	+0.102	3
4	Hypercar	93	(France) Peugeot TotalEnergies	1:35.662	+0.304	4
5	Hypercar	2	(United States) Cadillac Racing	1:35.720	+0.362	5
6	Hypercar	51	(Italy) Ferrari AF Corse	1:35.771	+0.413	6
7	Hypercar	94	(France) Peugeot TotalEnergies	1:35.780	+0.422	7
8	Hypercar	5	(Germany) Porsche Penske Motorsport	1:35.973	+0.615	8
9	Hypercar	38	(United Kingdom) Hertz Team Jota	1:36.188	+0.830	9
10	Hypercar	6	(Germany) Porsche Penske Motorsport	1:36.497	+1.139	10
11	Hypercar	708	(United States) Glickenhaus Racing	1:36.614	+1.256	11
12	Hypercar	99	(Germany) Proton Competition	1:36.668	+1.310	12
13	Hypercar	4	(Austria) Floyd Vanwall Racing Team	1:38.089	+2.731	13
14	**LMP2**	**41**	**(Belgium) Team WRT**	**1:39.354**	**+3.996**	**14**
15	LMP2	28	(United Kingdom) Jota	1:39.707	+4.349	15
16	LMP2	22	(United Kingdom) United Autosports	1:39.790	+4.432	16
17	LMP2	10	(United Kingdom) Vector Sport	1:39.887	+4.529	17
18	LMP2	34	(Poland) Inter Europol Competition	1:39.894	+4.536	18
19	LMP2	31	(Belgium) Team WRT	1:39.957	+4.599	19
20	LMP2	63	(Italy) Prema Racing	1:39.976	+4.618	20
21	LMP2	35	(France) Alpine Elf Team	1:40.061	+4.703	21
22	LMP2	36	(France) Alpine Elf Team	1:40.214	+4.856	22
23	LMP2	9	(Italy) Prema Racing	1:40.340	+4.982	23
24	LMP2	23	(United Kingdom) United Autosports	1:40.379	+5.021	24
25	**LMGTE Am**	**85**	**(Italy) Iron Dames**	**1:47.632**	**+12.274**	**25**
26	LMGTE Am	25	(Oman) ORT by TF	1:48.058	+12.700	26
27	LMGTE Am	77	(Germany) Dempsey-Proton Racing	1:48.116	+12.758	27
28	LMGTE Am	83	(Italy) Richard Mille AF Corse	1:48.221	+12.863	28
29	LMGTE Am	86	(United Kingdom) GR Racing	1:48.464	+13.106	29
30	LMGTE Am	33	(United States) Corvette Racing	1:48.519	+13.161	30
31	LMGTE Am	54	(Italy) AF Corse	1:48.599	+13.241	31
32	LMGTE Am	21	(Italy) AF Corse	1:48.713	+13.355	32
33	LMGTE Am	57	(Switzerland) Kessel Racing	1:48.962	+13.604	33
34	LMGTE Am	56	(Germany) Project 1 – AO	1:49.232	+13.874	34
35	LMGTE Am	777	(Japan) D'Station Racing	1:49.509	+14.151	35
36	LMGTE Am	60	(Italy) Iron Lynx	1:49.883	+14.525	36

== Race ==
The minimum number of laps for classification (70% of overall winning car's distance) was 140 laps. Class winners are in bold and ‡.

Final race classification
Pos	Class	No	Team	Drivers	Chassis	Tyre	Laps	Time/Retired
Pos	Class	No	Team	Drivers	Engine	Tyre	Laps	Time/Retired
1	**Hypercar**	**7**	**(Japan) Toyota Gazoo Racing**	**(United Kingdom) Mike Conway (Japan) Kamui Kobayashi (Argentina) José María López**	**Toyota GR010 Hybrid**	M	**200**	**6:00:31.922‡**
1	**Hypercar**	**7**	**(Japan) Toyota Gazoo Racing**	**(United Kingdom) Mike Conway (Japan) Kamui Kobayashi (Argentina) José María López**	**Toyota H8909 3.5 L Turbo V6**	M	**200**	**6:00:31.922‡**
2	Hypercar	50	(Italy) Ferrari AF Corse	(Italy) Antonio Fuoco (Spain) Miguel Molina (Denmark) Nicklas Nielsen	Ferrari 499P	M	200	+16.520
2	Hypercar	50	(Italy) Ferrari AF Corse	(Italy) Antonio Fuoco (Spain) Miguel Molina (Denmark) Nicklas Nielsen	Ferrari F163 3.0 L Turbo V6	M	200	+16.520
3	Hypercar	93	(France) Peugeot TotalEnergies	(Denmark) Mikkel Jensen (United Kingdom) Paul di Resta (France) Jean-Éric Vergne	Peugeot 9X8	M	200	+1:18.179
3	Hypercar	93	(France) Peugeot TotalEnergies	(Denmark) Mikkel Jensen (United Kingdom) Paul di Resta (France) Jean-Éric Vergne	Peugeot X6H 2.6 L Turbo V6	M	200	+1:18.179
4	Hypercar	5	(Germany) Porsche Penske Motorsport	(United States) Dane Cameron (Denmark) Michael Christensen (France) Frédéric Makowiecki	Porsche 963	M	199	+1 Lap
4	Hypercar	5	(Germany) Porsche Penske Motorsport	(United States) Dane Cameron (Denmark) Michael Christensen (France) Frédéric Makowiecki	Porsche 9RD 4.6 L Turbo V8	M	199	+1 Lap
5	Hypercar	51	(Italy) Ferrari AF Corse	(United Kingdom) James Calado (Italy) Antonio Giovinazzi (Italy) Alessandro Pier Guidi	Ferrari 499P	M	199	+1 Lap
5	Hypercar	51	(Italy) Ferrari AF Corse	(United Kingdom) James Calado (Italy) Antonio Giovinazzi (Italy) Alessandro Pier Guidi	Ferrari F163 3.0 L Turbo V6	M	199	+1 Lap
6	Hypercar	8	(Japan) Toyota Gazoo Racing	(Switzerland) Sébastien Buemi (New Zealand) Brendon Hartley (Japan) Ryo Hirakawa	Toyota GR010 Hybrid	M	199	+1 Lap
6	Hypercar	8	(Japan) Toyota Gazoo Racing	(Switzerland) Sébastien Buemi (New Zealand) Brendon Hartley (Japan) Ryo Hirakawa	Toyota H8909 3.5 L Turbo V6	M	199	+1 Lap
7	Hypercar	6	(Germany) Porsche Penske Motorsport	(France) Kévin Estre (Germany) André Lotterer (Belgium) Laurens Vanthoor	Porsche 963	M	199	+1 Lap
7	Hypercar	6	(Germany) Porsche Penske Motorsport	(France) Kévin Estre (Germany) André Lotterer (Belgium) Laurens Vanthoor	Porsche 9RD 4.6 L Turbo V8	M	199	+1 Lap
8	Hypercar	708	(United States) Glickenhaus Racing	(France) Nathanaël Berthon (France) Romain Dumas (France) Olivier Pla	Glickenhaus SCG 007 LMH	M	199	+1 Lap
8	Hypercar	708	(United States) Glickenhaus Racing	(France) Nathanaël Berthon (France) Romain Dumas (France) Olivier Pla	Glickenhaus P21 3.5 L Turbo V8	M	199	+1 Lap
9	Hypercar	38	(United Kingdom) Hertz Team Jota	(Portugal) António Félix da Costa (United Kingdom) Will Stevens (China) Yifei Ye	Porsche 963	M	198	+2 Laps
9	Hypercar	38	(United Kingdom) Hertz Team Jota	(Portugal) António Félix da Costa (United Kingdom) Will Stevens (China) Yifei Ye	Porsche 9RD 4.6 L Turbo V8	M	198	+2 Laps
10	Hypercar	2	(United States) Cadillac Racing	(New Zealand) Earl Bamber (United Kingdom) Alex Lynn (United Kingdom) Richard Westbrook	Cadillac V-Series.R	M	198	+2 Laps
10	Hypercar	2	(United States) Cadillac Racing	(New Zealand) Earl Bamber (United Kingdom) Alex Lynn (United Kingdom) Richard Westbrook	Cadillac LMC55R 5.5 L V8	M	198	+2 Laps
11	**LMP2**	**28**	**(United Kingdom) Jota**	**(Brazil) Pietro Fittipaldi (Denmark) David Heinemeier Hansson (Denmark) Oliver Rasmussen**	**Oreca 07**	G	**193**	**+7 Laps‡**
11	**LMP2**	**28**	**(United Kingdom) Jota**	**(Brazil) Pietro Fittipaldi (Denmark) David Heinemeier Hansson (Denmark) Oliver Rasmussen**	**Gibson GK428 4.2 L V8**	G	**193**	**+7 Laps‡**
12	LMP2	36	(France) Alpine Elf Team	(France) Julien Canal (France) Charles Milesi (France) Matthieu Vaxivière	Oreca 07	G	192	+8 Laps
12	LMP2	36	(France) Alpine Elf Team	(France) Julien Canal (France) Charles Milesi (France) Matthieu Vaxivière	Gibson GK428 4.2 L V8	G	192	+8 Laps
13	LMP2	41	(Belgium) Team WRT	(Angola) Rui Andrade (Switzerland) Louis Delétraz (Poland) Robert Kubica	Oreca 07	G	192	+8 Laps
13	LMP2	41	(Belgium) Team WRT	(Angola) Rui Andrade (Switzerland) Louis Delétraz (Poland) Robert Kubica	Gibson GK428 4.2 L V8	G	192	+8 Laps
14	LMP2	23	(United Kingdom) United Autosports	(Netherlands) Giedo van der Garde (United Kingdom) Oliver Jarvis (United States) Josh Pierson	Oreca 07	G	192	+8 Laps
14	LMP2	23	(United Kingdom) United Autosports	(Netherlands) Giedo van der Garde (United Kingdom) Oliver Jarvis (United States) Josh Pierson	Gibson GK428 4.2 L V8	G	192	+8 Laps
15	LMP2	34	(Poland) Inter Europol Competition	(Spain) Albert Costa (Switzerland) Fabio Scherer (Poland) Jakub Śmiechowski	Oreca 07	G	192	+8 Laps
15	LMP2	34	(Poland) Inter Europol Competition	(Spain) Albert Costa (Switzerland) Fabio Scherer (Poland) Jakub Śmiechowski	Gibson GK428 4.2 L V8	G	192	+8 Laps
16	LMP2	22	(United Kingdom) United Autosports	(United Kingdom) Ben Hanley (United Kingdom) Philip Hanson (United Kingdom) Frederick Lubin	Oreca 07	G	192	+8 Laps
16	LMP2	22	(United Kingdom) United Autosports	(United Kingdom) Ben Hanley (United Kingdom) Philip Hanson (United Kingdom) Frederick Lubin	Gibson GK428 4.2 L V8	G	192	+8 Laps
17	LMP2	63	(Italy) Prema Racing	(Switzerland) Mathias Beche; Daniil Kvyat (France) Doriane Pin	Oreca 07	G	192	+8 Laps
17	LMP2	63	(Italy) Prema Racing	(Switzerland) Mathias Beche; Daniil Kvyat (France) Doriane Pin	Gibson GK428 4.2 L V8	G	192	+8 Laps
18	LMP2	35	(France) Alpine Elf Team	(United Kingdom) Olli Caldwell (Brazil) André Negrão (Mexico) Memo Rojas	Oreca 07	G	192	+8 Laps
18	LMP2	35	(France) Alpine Elf Team	(United Kingdom) Olli Caldwell (Brazil) André Negrão (Mexico) Memo Rojas	Gibson GK428 4.2 L V8	G	192	+8 Laps
19	Hypercar	94	(France) Peugeot TotalEnergies	(France) Loïc Duval (United States) Gustavo Menezes (Switzerland) Nico Müller	Peugeot 9X8	M	191	+9 Laps
19	Hypercar	94	(France) Peugeot TotalEnergies	(France) Loïc Duval (United States) Gustavo Menezes (Switzerland) Nico Müller	Peugeot X6H 2.6 L Turbo V6	M	191	+9 Laps
20	Hypercar	4	(Austria) Floyd Vanwall Racing Team	(Argentina) Esteban Guerrieri (Brazil) João Paulo de Oliveira (France) Tristan Vautier	Vanwall Vandervell 680	M	191	+9 Laps
20	Hypercar	4	(Austria) Floyd Vanwall Racing Team	(Argentina) Esteban Guerrieri (Brazil) João Paulo de Oliveira (France) Tristan Vautier	Gibson GL458 4.5 L V8	M	191	+9 Laps
21	LMP2	9	(Italy) Prema Racing	(Italy) Andrea Caldarelli (Romania) Filip Ugran (Netherlands) Bent Viscaal	Oreca 07	G	191	+9 Laps
21	LMP2	9	(Italy) Prema Racing	(Italy) Andrea Caldarelli (Romania) Filip Ugran (Netherlands) Bent Viscaal	Gibson GK428 4.2 L V8	G	191	+9 Laps
22	**LMGTE Am**	**77**	**(Germany) Dempsey-Proton Racing**	**(France) Julien Andlauer (Germany) Christian Ried (Denmark) Mikkel O. Pedersen**	**Porsche 911 RSR-19**	M	**185**	**+15 Laps‡**
22	**LMGTE Am**	**77**	**(Germany) Dempsey-Proton Racing**	**(France) Julien Andlauer (Germany) Christian Ried (Denmark) Mikkel O. Pedersen**	**Porsche 4.2 L Flat-6**	M	**185**	**+15 Laps‡**
23	LMGTE Am	60	(Italy) Iron Lynx	(Italy) Matteo Cressoni (Belgium) Alessio Picariello (Italy) Claudio Schiavoni	Porsche 911 RSR-19	M	185	+15 Laps
23	LMGTE Am	60	(Italy) Iron Lynx	(Italy) Matteo Cressoni (Belgium) Alessio Picariello (Italy) Claudio Schiavoni	Porsche 4.2 L Flat-6	M	185	+15 Laps
24	LMGTE Am	86	(United Kingdom) GR Racing	(United Kingdom) Ben Barker (Italy) Riccardo Pera (United Kingdom) Michael Wainwright	Porsche 911 RSR-19	M	184	+16 Laps
24	LMGTE Am	86	(United Kingdom) GR Racing	(United Kingdom) Ben Barker (Italy) Riccardo Pera (United Kingdom) Michael Wainwright	Porsche 4.2 L Flat-6	M	184	+16 Laps
25	LMGTE Am	33	(United States) Corvette Racing	(Netherlands) Nicky Catsburg (United States) Ben Keating (Argentina) Nicolás Varrone	Chevrolet Corvette C8.R	M	184	+16 Laps
25	LMGTE Am	33	(United States) Corvette Racing	(Netherlands) Nicky Catsburg (United States) Ben Keating (Argentina) Nicolás Varrone	Chevrolet 5.5 L V8	M	184	+16 Laps
26	LMGTE Am	85	(Italy) Iron Dames	(Belgium) Sarah Bovy (Switzerland) Rahel Frey (Denmark) Michelle Gatting	Porsche 911 RSR-19	M	184	+16 Laps
26	LMGTE Am	85	(Italy) Iron Dames	(Belgium) Sarah Bovy (Switzerland) Rahel Frey (Denmark) Michelle Gatting	Porsche 4.2 L Flat-6	M	184	+16 Laps
27	LMGTE Am	83	(Italy) Richard Mille AF Corse	(Argentina) Luis Pérez Companc (Italy) Alessio Rovera (France) Lilou Wadoux	Ferrari 488 GTE Evo	M	183	+17 Laps
27	LMGTE Am	83	(Italy) Richard Mille AF Corse	(Argentina) Luis Pérez Companc (Italy) Alessio Rovera (France) Lilou Wadoux	Ferrari F154CB 3.9 L Turbo V8	M	183	+17 Laps
28	LMGTE Am	25	(Oman) ORT by TF	(Oman) Ahmad Al Harthy (United States) Michael Dinan (Republic of Ireland) Charlie Eastwood	Aston Martin Vantage AMR	M	183	+17 Laps
28	LMGTE Am	25	(Oman) ORT by TF	(Oman) Ahmad Al Harthy (United States) Michael Dinan (Republic of Ireland) Charlie Eastwood	Aston Martin 4.0 L Turbo V8	M	183	+17 Laps
29	LMGTE Am	56	(Germany) Project 1 – AO	(Italy) Matteo Cairoli (Dominican Republic) Efrin Castro (Portugal) Guilherme Oliveira	Porsche 911 RSR-19	M	183	+17 Laps
29	LMGTE Am	56	(Germany) Project 1 – AO	(Italy) Matteo Cairoli (Dominican Republic) Efrin Castro (Portugal) Guilherme Oliveira	Porsche 4.2 L Flat-6	M	183	+17 Laps
30	LMGTE Am	21	(Italy) AF Corse	(United States) Simon Mann (Belgium) Ulysse de Pauw (France) Julien Piguet	Ferrari 488 GTE Evo	M	182	+18 Laps
30	LMGTE Am	21	(Italy) AF Corse	(United States) Simon Mann (Belgium) Ulysse de Pauw (France) Julien Piguet	Ferrari F154CB 3.9 L Turbo V8	M	182	+18 Laps
31	LMGTE Am	54	(Italy) AF Corse	(Italy) Francesco Castellacci (Switzerland) Thomas Flohr (Italy) Davide Rigon	Ferrari 488 GTE Evo	M	180	+20 Laps
31	LMGTE Am	54	(Italy) AF Corse	(Italy) Francesco Castellacci (Switzerland) Thomas Flohr (Italy) Davide Rigon	Ferrari F154CB 3.9 L Turbo V8	M	180	+20 Laps
NC	LMP2	31	(Belgium) Team WRT	(Netherlands) Robin Frijns (Indonesia) Sean Gelael (Austria) Ferdinand Habsburg	Oreca 07	G	179	Not classified
NC	LMP2	31	(Belgium) Team WRT	(Netherlands) Robin Frijns (Indonesia) Sean Gelael (Austria) Ferdinand Habsburg	Gibson GK428 4.2 L V8	G	179	Not classified
Ret	Hypercar	99	(Germany) Proton Competition	(Italy) Gianmaria Bruni (Switzerland) Neel Jani (United Kingdom) Harry Tincknell	Porsche 963	M	134	Retired
Ret	Hypercar	99	(Germany) Proton Competition	(Italy) Gianmaria Bruni (Switzerland) Neel Jani (United Kingdom) Harry Tincknell	Porsche 9RD 4.6 L Turbo V8	M	134	Retired
Ret	LMGTE Am	57	(Switzerland) Kessel Racing	(Japan) Kei Cozzolino (United States) Scott Huffaker (Japan) Takeshi Kimura	Ferrari 488 GTE Evo	M	70	Retired
Ret	LMGTE Am	57	(Switzerland) Kessel Racing	(Japan) Kei Cozzolino (United States) Scott Huffaker (Japan) Takeshi Kimura	Ferrari F154CB 3.9 L Turbo V8	M	70	Retired
Ret	LMP2	10	(United Kingdom) Vector Sport	(France) Gabriel Aubry (Republic of Ireland) Ryan Cullen (Liechtenstein) Matthias Kaiser	Oreca 07	G	66	Retired
Ret	LMP2	10	(United Kingdom) Vector Sport	(France) Gabriel Aubry (Republic of Ireland) Ryan Cullen (Liechtenstein) Matthias Kaiser	Gibson GK428 4.2 L V8	G	66	Retired
Ret	LMGTE Am	777	(Japan) D'Station Racing	(Japan) Tomonobu Fujii (Japan) Satoshi Hoshino (United Kingdom) Casper Stevenson	Aston Martin Vantage AMR	M	7	Retired
Ret	LMGTE Am	777	(Japan) D'Station Racing	(Japan) Tomonobu Fujii (Japan) Satoshi Hoshino (United Kingdom) Casper Stevenson	Aston Martin 4.0 L Turbo V8	M	7	Retired

Tyre manufacturers
Key
Symbol	Tyre manufacturer
**G**	Goodyear
**M**	Michelin

== Notes ==
FIA World Endurance Championship
Previous race: 24 Hours of Le Mans	2023 season	Next race: 6 Hours of Fuji
