= Glickenhaus SCG 007 LMH =

Prototype racing car

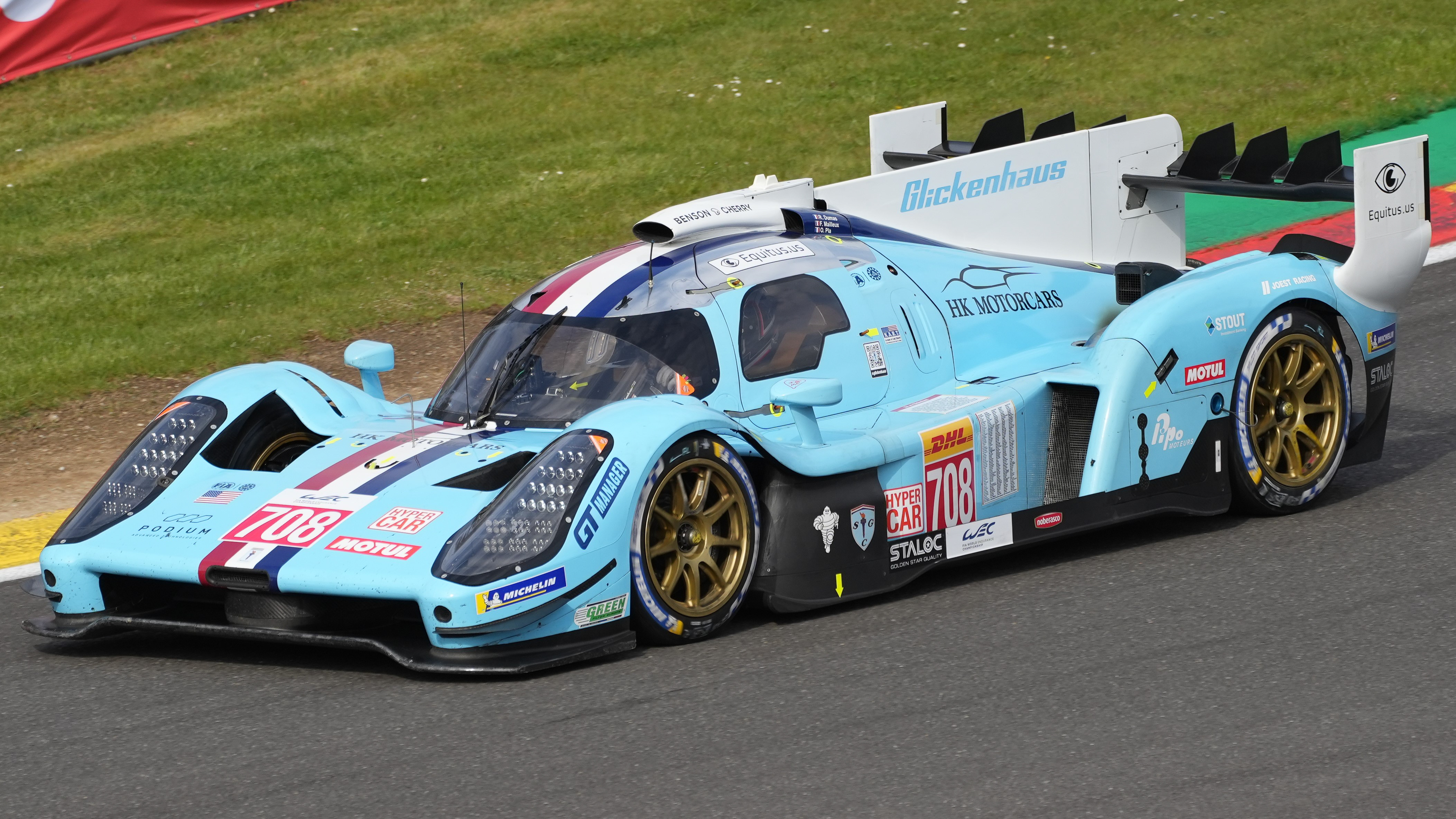
- The No. 708 SCG 007 at the 2023 6 Hours of Spa-Francorchamps
- Category: Le Mans Hypercar
- Constructor: Scuderia Cameron Glickenhaus (Podium)
- Designers: Mark Tatham (Project Chief Engineer); Stefano Rapisarda (Technical Director); Michael Young (Exterior Designer); Barry Harvey (Team Leader, Chassis); Massimiliano Turco (Team Leader, Electronics Design); Mick Lindley (Team Leader, Suspension, Steering and Brakes); Igor Zanetti (Team Leader, Engine and Controls); Chris Hornby (Team Leader, Engine Installation)

Technical specifications
- Chassis: Carbon fibre composite monocoque
- Suspension (front): Double wishbone, push rod operated over damper
- Suspension (rear): Double wishbone, push rod operated over damper
- Length: 4,991 mm (196 in)
- Width: 2,000 mm (79 in)
- Height: 1,224 mm (48 in)
- Engine: Glickenhaus by Pipo Moteurs P21 3.5 litre V8 90° twin-turbo, 9,000 rpm maximum revolutions mid-engined, longitudinally mounted
- Transmission: Xtrac 7-speed sequential manual
- Power: 671 bhp (680 PS; 500 kW)
- Weight: 1,050 kg (2,310 lb)
- Fuel: TotalEnergies
- Lubricants: Motul
- Brakes: AP Racing carbon 380/355mm with AP Monobloc 6-piston calipers
- Tyres: Michelin slicks with OZ one-piece forged alloys, 29/71-18 front and 34/71-18 rear

Competition history
- Notable entrants: (United States) Scuderia Cameron Glickenhaus
- Notable drivers: (United States) Gustavo Menezes (France) Olivier Pla (Brazil) Pipo Derani (France) Franck Mailleux (United Kingdom) Richard Westbrook (France) Romain Dumas (Australia) Ryan Briscoe
- Debut: 2021 8 Hours of Portimão
- Last event: 2023 6 Hours of Monza
| Races | Wins | Podiums | Poles | F/Laps |
|---|---|---|---|---|
| 12 | 0 | 2 | 2 | 1 |
- Teams' Championships: 0
- Constructors' Championships: 0
- Drivers' Championships: 0

The Scuderia Cameron Glickenhaus SCG 007 LMH is a sports prototype built by American manufacturer Scuderia Cameron Glickenhaus to compete in the Le Mans Hypercar category of the FIA World Endurance Championship. It made its debut at the 2021 8 Hours of Portimão. At the 2022 24 Hours of Le Mans, it became the first American sports car to secure an overall podium at the 24 Hours of Le Mans in 53 years.

== Background ==
Following the introduction of the new Le Mans Hypercar regulations in June 2018, American film producer and company founder James Glickenhaus revealed his interest in entering a sports prototype, believing that the new regulations that were set to replace the outgoing LMP1 ruleset were a "natural and wonderful direction to take". He stressed that although there was interest in developing a car to compete, the company would need a significant level of investment. Glickenhaus previously expressed interest in creating a sports prototype in 2014, showcasing sketches of a race car based on the Ferrari P4/5, a car he commissioned with Pininfarina.

A month later on July 27, 2018, Scuderia Cameron Glickenhaus announced their entrance into the FIA World Endurance Championship, officially presenting the car they would race with, called the SCG 007 LMH. Glickenhaus would be the first manufacturer to commit to the new Le Mans Hypercar regulations and in turn develop the first non-hybrid car in the class. The SCG 007 LMH's chassis was developed in collaboration with Podium Advanced Technologies. Sauber Motorsport provided aerodynamics expertise and wind tunnel access, and Joest Racing helped with logistics and operational assistance for the team during competition. It uses a bespoke 3.5-liter twin-turbocharged V8 developed by French engine manufacturer Pipo Moteurs based on their inline-4 engines used in the FIA World Rally Championship.

Testing commenced at Vallelunga Circuit in February 2021, where the car also made its public debut, driven by Romain Dumas. He, along with Ryan Briscoe, and Richard Westbrook were confirmed to be driving the SCG 007 LMH in the team's debut at the 2021 8 Hours of Portimão. Pipo Derani, Gustavo Menezes, and Olivier Pla were confirmed to be driving a second entry in the next race at the 2021 6 Hours of Monza. Franck Mailleux also joined the team at Monza as part of the #709 team substituting Briscoe, and was later transferred to the #708 car ahead of the 2021 24 Hours of Le Mans, replacing Menezes.

== Competition history ==
The No. 709 at the 2022 24 Hours of Le Mans, where it secured a podium.

Although Glickenhaus were confirmed to be racing in the 2021 FIA World Endurance Championship, the team were unable to take part in the season-opening 2021 6 Hours of Spa-Francorchamps due to not completing homologation tests in time. The car officially made its debut at the next race in the 2021 8 Hours of Portimão, where it suffered significant setbacks, including excessive tire wear caused by high brake temperatures as well as lengthy repairs following a crash. The SCG 007 LMH showcased its potential at the following race in the 2021 6 Hours of Monza, finishing the race 4th overall and 3rd in class.

For the 2022 FIA World Endurance Championship, Glickenhaus committed to a single-car entry with the intention of completing the full season, only entering a second car at the 2022 24 Hours of Le Mans. At the 2022 1000 Miles of Sebring, the team secured their first overall podium finish with the SCG 007 LMH, where the full season #708 car finished 3rd. Glickenhaus scored their first pole position in the series at the next race in the 2022 6 Hours of Spa-Francorchamps, but miscommunication between the team and Pipo Derani caused Glickenhaus to fall to 9th overall. Glickenhaus achieved their best pair of results with the SCG 007 LMH at the 2022 24 Hours of Le Mans, where they finished the race 3rd and 4th overall, securing a Le Mans podium in the process. The SCG 007 LMH became the first American sports car to secure an overall podium at Le Mans in 53 years since the Ford GT40 won in 1969. The team took home another pole position at the 2022 6 Hours of Monza and were on course to compete for the overall victory against Toyota and Alpine, however, a turbocharger failure forced the team to retire the car.

Following the convergence of the Le Mans Hypercar and LMDh regulations for 2023, Glickenhaus displayed interest in racing in the IMSA SportsCar Championship with the SCG 007 LMH, but were blocked from doing so with IMSA confirming their production car mandate of 2,500 road cars per year. Team founder James Glickenhaus expressed frustration over the decision, describing it as "idiotic". He also cited the mandate as having impacted the team's financial position, stating that the inability to compete in IMSA created problems with attracting sponsors, despite the series being hosted domestically in the United States.

The team returned for another single-car WEC season in 2023, however it would prove to be less fruitful, as competition levels began to rise with Cadillac, Ferrari, Peugeot, and Porsche joining the series. The SCG 007 LMH lacked competitiveness and would qualify towards the back throughout the season, its best finish coming at the 2023 24 Hours of Le Mans, completing the race in 6th and 7th overall.

In October 2023, it was announced that Glickenhaus would not return to the FIA World Endurance Championship in 2024 due to a lack of substantial funding. The company reallocated their resources towards their road car projects following the announcement. Podium Advanced Technologies later revealed that the SCG 007 LMH was set to receive an 'Evo' performance upgrade, but was ultimately left undeveloped as a result.

== Road car version ==
In May 2025, Scuderia Cameron Glickenhaus teased a three-seater, road going version of the SCG 007 LMH on Instagram featuring photos of the car's development in the company's factory, called the Scuderia Cameron Glickenhaus SCG 007s. The car was formally unveiled to the public at the Concorso d'Eleganza Villa d'Este in Lake Como, Italy later that month. Only 24 units were built.

Based on the SCG 007 LMH platform, the car is entirely bespoke from the race car, though shares some mechanical parts, including double wishbone push-rod suspension tweaked for road use. The powertrain is also different from the race car, making use of a 6.2-liter twin-turbocharged V8 producing 1,000 hp (750 kW; 1,000 PS) mated to a 7-speed automated manual gearbox. The car weighs 3,417 lb (1,550 kg). Its design takes direct inspiration from the SCG 007 LMH and wears an identical blue livery that was used by the race car ahead of the 2022 6 Hours of Monza.

== Complete World Endurance Championship results ==
Results in bold indicate pole position. Results in italics indicate fastest lap.

| Year | Entrants | Class | Drivers | No. | 1 | 2 | 3 | 4 | 5 | 6 | 7 | Points | Pos |
|---|---|---|---|---|---|---|---|---|---|---|---|---|---|
| 2021 | (United States) Glickenhaus Racing | Hypercar | | | SPA | POR | MON | LMN | BHR | BHR | | **37** | **3rd** |
| 2021 | (United States) Glickenhaus Racing | Hypercar | (United States) Gustavo Menezes | 708 | | | Ret | | | | | **37** | **3rd** |
| 2021 | (United States) Glickenhaus Racing | Hypercar | (France) Olivier Pla | 708 | | | Ret | 4 | | | | **37** | **3rd** |
| 2021 | (United States) Glickenhaus Racing | Hypercar | (Brazil) Pipo Derani | 708 | | | Ret | 4 | | | | **37** | **3rd** |
| 2021 | (United States) Glickenhaus Racing | Hypercar | (France) Franck Mailleux | 708 | | | | 4 | | | | **37** | **3rd** |
| 2021 | (United States) Glickenhaus Racing | Hypercar | (France) Franck Mailleux | 709 | | | 4 | | | | | **37** | **3rd** |
| 2021 | (United States) Glickenhaus Racing | Hypercar | (United Kingdom) Richard Westbrook | 709 | | 30 | 4 | 5 | | | | **37** | **3rd** |
| 2021 | (United States) Glickenhaus Racing | Hypercar | (France) Romain Dumas | 709 | | 30 | 4 | 5 | | | | **37** | **3rd** |
| 2021 | (United States) Glickenhaus Racing | Hypercar | (Australia) Ryan Briscoe | 709 | | 30 | | 5 | | | | **37** | **3rd** |
| 2022 | (United States) Glickenhaus Racing | Hypercar | | | SEB | SPA | LMN | MON | FUJ | BHR | | **70** | **3rd** |
| 2022 | (United States) Glickenhaus Racing | Hypercar | (France) Olivier Pla | 708 | 3 | **9** | 4 | **Ret** | | | | **70** | **3rd** |
| 2022 | (United States) Glickenhaus Racing | Hypercar | (France) Romain Dumas | 708 | 3 | **9** | 4 | **Ret** | | | | **70** | **3rd** |
| 2022 | (United States) Glickenhaus Racing | Hypercar | (Brazil) Pipo Derani | 708 | | **9** | 4 | **Ret** | | | | **70** | **3rd** |
| 2022 | (United States) Glickenhaus Racing | Hypercar | (Australia) Ryan Briscoe | 708 | 3 | | | | | | | **70** | **3rd** |
| 2022 | (United States) Glickenhaus Racing | Hypercar | (Australia) Ryan Briscoe | 709 | | | 3 | | | | | **70** | **3rd** |
| 2022 | (United States) Glickenhaus Racing | Hypercar | (France) Franck Mailleux | 709 | | | 3 | | | | | **70** | **3rd** |
| 2022 | (United States) Glickenhaus Racing | Hypercar | (United Kingdom) Richard Westbrook | 709 | | | 3 | | | | | **70** | **3rd** |
| 2023 | (United States) Glickenhaus Racing | Hypercar | | | SEB | POR | SPA | LMN | MON | FUJ | BHR | 36 | 6th |
| 2023 | (United States) Glickenhaus Racing | Hypercar | (France) Olivier Pla | 708 | Ret | 8 | 13 | 6 | 8 | | | 36 | 6th |
| 2023 | (United States) Glickenhaus Racing | Hypercar | (Australia) Ryan Briscoe | 708 | Ret | 8 | | 6 | | | | 36 | 6th |
| 2023 | (United States) Glickenhaus Racing | Hypercar | (France) Romain Dumas | 708 | Ret | 8 | 13 | 6 | 8 | | | 36 | 6th |
| 2023 | (United States) Glickenhaus Racing | Hypercar | (France) Nathanaël Berthon | 708 | | | | | 8 | | | 36 | 6th |
| 2023 | (United States) Glickenhaus Racing | Hypercar | (France) Franck Mailleux | 708 | | | 13 | | | | | 36 | 6th |
| 2023 | (United States) Glickenhaus Racing | Hypercar | (France) Franck Mailleux | 709 | | | | 7 | | | | 36 | 6th |
| 2023 | (United States) Glickenhaus Racing | Hypercar | (France) Nathanaël Berthon | 709 | | | | 7 | | | | 36 | 6th |
| 2023 | (United States) Glickenhaus Racing | Hypercar | (Mexico) Esteban Gutiérrez | 709 | | | | 7 | | | | 36 | 6th |
