= 2022 1000 Miles of Sebring =

Sports car endurance race held in Sebring, Florida, USA

Track map of the Sebring International Raceway

The 2022 1000 Miles of Sebring was an endurance sportscar racing event held on the 18 March 2022, as the opening round of the 2022 FIA World Endurance Championship. This was the second running of the race, a 268-lap event or 8 hours (whichever comes first), and the first time the event had been held since the 2019 1000 Miles of Sebring, after due to the 2020 and 2021 races being cancelled by the COVID-19 pandemic.

== Background ==
The provisional calendar for the 2022 FIA World Endurance Championship released in August 2021. It saw a few changes, with the return of the Sebring and Fuji races, whilst the Portimao and second Bahrain races were dropped.

== Entry list ==
The entry list was revealed on 9 March 2022.

== Qualifying ==
Pole position winners in each class are marked in bold.

Pos	Class	No.	Team	Time	Gap	Grid
1	**Hypercar**	**36**	**(France) Alpine Elf Team**	**1:47.407**	-	**1**
2	Hypercar	708	(United States) Glickenhaus Racing	1:48.471	+1.334	2
3	**LMP2 Pro-Am**	**83**	**(Italy) AF Corse**	**1:49.014**	**+1.607**	**3**
4	Hypercar	8	(Japan) Toyota Gazoo Racing	1:49.217	+1.810	4
5	**LMP2**	**22**	**(United States) United Autosports USA**	**1:49.388**	**+1.981**	**5**
6	LMP2	23	(United States) United Autosports USA	1:49.510	+2.103	6
7	Hypercar	7	(Japan) Toyota Gazoo Racing	1:49.581	+2.174	7
8	LMP2	31	(Belgium) WRT	1:49.670	+2.263	8
9	LMP2	41	(Switzerland) RealTeam by WRT	1:49.688	+2.281	9
10	LMP2	9	(Italy) Prema Orlen Team	1:50.057	+2.650	10
11	LMP2	28	(United Kingdom) JOTA	1:50.178	+2.771	11
12	LMP2	38	(United Kingdom) JOTA	1:50.596	+3.189	12
13	LMP2	5	(United States) Team Penske	1:50.629	+3.222	13
14	LMP2	1	(France) Richard Mille Racing Team	1:50.916	+3.509	14
15	LMP2 Pro-Am	35	(France) Ultimate	1:50.954	+3.547	15
16	LMP2	10	(United Kingdom) Vector Sport	1:50.955	+3.548	16
17	LMP2 Pro-Am	44	(Slovakia) ARC Bratislava	1:51.182	+3.775	17
18	LMP2 Pro-Am	45	(Portugal) Algarve Pro Racing	1:51.332	+3.925	18
19	**LMGTE Pro**	**92**	**(Germany) Porsche GT Team**	**1:57.233**	**+9.826**	**19**
20	LMGTE Pro	91	(Germany) Porsche GT Team	1:57.383	+9.976	20
21	LMGTE Pro	64	(United States) Corvette Racing	1:57.696	+10.289	21
22	**LMGTE Am**	**33**	**(United Kingdom) TF Sport**	**1:59.204**	**+11.797**	**22**
23	LMGTE Pro	51	(Italy) AF Corse	1:59.299	+11.892	23
24	LMGTE Pro	52	(Italy) AF Corse	1:59.388	+11.981	24
25	LMGTE Am	98	(Canada) Northwest AMR	2:00.570	+13.163	25
26	LMGTE Am	56	(Germany) Team Project 1	2:00.649	+13.242	26
27	LMGTE Am	85	(Italy) Iron Dames	2:01.140	+13.733	27
28	LMGTE Am	777	(Japan) D'Station Racing	2:01.379	+13.972	28
29	LMGTE Am	77	(Germany) Dempsey-Proton Racing	2:02.079	+14.672	29
30	LMGTE Am	54	(Italy) AF Corse	2:02.264	+14.857	30
31	LMGTE Am	71	(Switzerland) Spirit of Race	2:02.800	+15.393	31
32	LMGTE Am	21	(Italy) AF Corse	2:03.116	+15.709	32
33	LMGTE Am	88	(Germany) Dempsey-Proton Racing	2:03.560	+16.153	33
34	LMGTE Am	60	(Italy) Iron Lynx	2:03.726	+16.319	34
35	LMGTE Am	46	(Germany) Team Project 1	No Time	—	35
36	LMP2	34	(Poland) Inter Europol Competition	No Time	—	36

== Race ==
The race was stopped twice during the course of the event with red flags. The first stoppage was after the crash of the #7 Toyota Gazoo Racing entry, which required extensive time for car recovery and barrier repair. The second stoppage occurred in the final hour due to lightning strikes and heavy rain showers in the area. The race was ultimately ended early due to the weather conditions.

=== Race Result ===
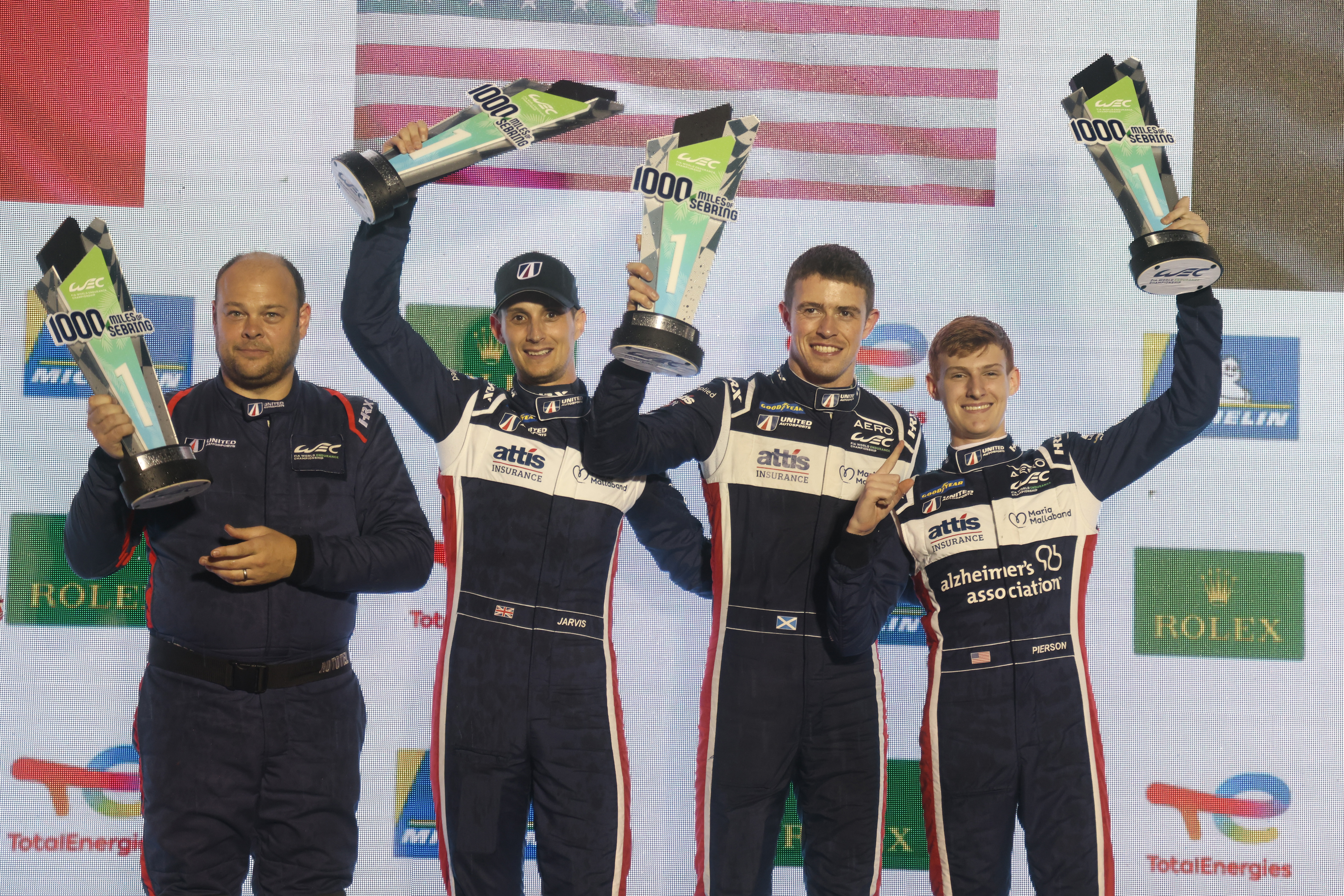
The No. 23 United Autosports USA team won the race in LMP2 class.

The minimum number of laps for classification (70% of the overall winning car's distance) was 136 laps. Class winners are in bold and ‡.

Pos	Class	No	Team	Drivers	Chassis	Tyre	Laps	Time/Retired
Pos	Class	No	Team	Drivers	Engine	Tyre	Laps	Time/Retired
1	**Hypercar**	**36**	**(France) Alpine Elf Team**	**(Brazil) André Negrão (France) Nicolas Lapierre (France) Matthieu Vaxivière**	**Alpine A480**	M	**194**	**7:15:37.293‡**
1	**Hypercar**	**36**	**(France) Alpine Elf Team**	**(Brazil) André Negrão (France) Nicolas Lapierre (France) Matthieu Vaxivière**	**Gibson GL458 4.5 L V8**	M	**194**	**7:15:37.293‡**
2	Hypercar	8	(Japan) Toyota Gazoo Racing	(Switzerland) Sebastien Buemi (New Zealand) Brendon Hartley (Japan) Ryo Hirakawa	Toyota GR010 Hybrid	M	194	+37.466
2	Hypercar	8	(Japan) Toyota Gazoo Racing	(Switzerland) Sebastien Buemi (New Zealand) Brendon Hartley (Japan) Ryo Hirakawa	Toyota H8909 3.5 L Turbo V6	M	194	+37.466
3	Hypercar	708	(United States) Glickenhaus Racing	(France) Olivier Pla (France) Romain Dumas (United States) Ryan Briscoe	Glickenhaus SCG 007 LMH	M	193	+1 Lap
3	Hypercar	708	(United States) Glickenhaus Racing	(France) Olivier Pla (France) Romain Dumas (United States) Ryan Briscoe	Glickenhaus P21 3.5 L Turbo V8	M	193	+1 Lap
4	**LMP2**	**23**	**(United States) United Autosports USA**	**(United Kingdom) Paul di Resta (United Kingdom) Oliver Jarvis (United States) Josh Pierson**	**Oreca 07**	G	**192**	**+2 Laps‡**
4	**LMP2**	**23**	**(United States) United Autosports USA**	**(United Kingdom) Paul di Resta (United Kingdom) Oliver Jarvis (United States) Josh Pierson**	**Gibson GK428 4.2 L V8**	G	**192**	**+2 Laps‡**
5	LMP2	31	(Belgium) WRT	(Indonesia) Sean Gelael (Netherlands) Robin Frijns (Germany) René Rast	Oreca 07	G	192	+2 Laps
5	LMP2	31	(Belgium) WRT	(Indonesia) Sean Gelael (Netherlands) Robin Frijns (Germany) René Rast	Gibson GK428 4.2 L V8	G	192	+2 Laps
6	LMP2	41	(Switzerland) RealTeam by WRT	(Portugal) Rui Andrade (Austria) Ferdinand Habsburg (France) Norman Nato	Oreca 07	G	192	+2 Laps
6	LMP2	41	(Switzerland) RealTeam by WRT	(Portugal) Rui Andrade (Austria) Ferdinand Habsburg (France) Norman Nato	Gibson GK428 4.2 L V8	G	192	+2 Laps
7	LMP2	9	(Italy) Prema Orlen Team	(Poland) Robert Kubica (Switzerland) Louis Deletraz (Italy) Lorenzo Colombo	Oreca 07	G	192	+2 Laps
7	LMP2	9	(Italy) Prema Orlen Team	(Poland) Robert Kubica (Switzerland) Louis Deletraz (Italy) Lorenzo Colombo	Gibson Technology GK428 V8	G	192	+2 Laps
8	LMP2	28	(United Kingdom) Jota	(Denmark) Oliver Rasmussen (United Kingdom) Edward Jones (South Africa) Jonathan Aberdein	Oreca 07	G	192	+2 Laps
8	LMP2	28	(United Kingdom) Jota	(Denmark) Oliver Rasmussen (United Kingdom) Edward Jones (South Africa) Jonathan Aberdein	Gibson GK428 4.2 L V8	G	192	+2 Laps
9	LMP2	38	(United Kingdom) Jota	(Mexico) Roberto González (Portugal) Antonio Felix da Costa (United Kingdom) Will Stevens	Oreca 07	G	192	+2 Laps
9	LMP2	38	(United Kingdom) Jota	(Mexico) Roberto González (Portugal) Antonio Felix da Costa (United Kingdom) Will Stevens	Gibson GK428 4.2 L V8	G	192	+2 Laps
10	LMP2	22	(United States) United Autosports USA	(United Kingdom) Philip Hanson (Portugal) Filipe Albuquerque (United States) Will Owen	Oreca 07	G	192	+2 Laps
10	LMP2	22	(United States) United Autosports USA	(United Kingdom) Philip Hanson (Portugal) Filipe Albuquerque (United States) Will Owen	Gibson GK428 4.2 L V8	G	192	+2 Laps
11	LMP2	5	(United States) Team Penske	(United States) Dane Cameron (France) Emmanuel Collard (Brazil) Felipe Nasr	Oreca 07	G	192	+2 Laps
11	LMP2	5	(United States) Team Penske	(United States) Dane Cameron (France) Emmanuel Collard (Brazil) Felipe Nasr	Gibson GK428 4.2 L V8	G	192	+2 Laps
12	**LMP2 Pro-Am**	**83**	**(Italy) AF Corse**	**(France) François Perrodo (Denmark) Nicklas Nielsen (Italy) Alessio Rovera**	**Oreca 07**	G	**191**	**+3 Laps‡**
12	**LMP2 Pro-Am**	**83**	**(Italy) AF Corse**	**(France) François Perrodo (Denmark) Nicklas Nielsen (Italy) Alessio Rovera**	**Gibson GK428 4.2 L V8**	G	**191**	**+3 Laps‡**
13	LMP2 Pro-Am	35	(France) Ultimate	(France) Jean-Baptiste Lahaye (France) Matthieu Lahaye (France) François Heriau	Oreca 07	G	190	+4 Laps
13	LMP2 Pro-Am	35	(France) Ultimate	(France) Jean-Baptiste Lahaye (France) Matthieu Lahaye (France) François Heriau	Gibson GK428 4.2 L V8	G	190	+4 Laps
14	LMP2 Pro-Am	45	(Portugal) Algarve Pro Racing	(United States) Steven Thomas (Australia) James Allen (Austria) René Binder	Oreca 07	G	190	+4 Laps
14	LMP2 Pro-Am	45	(Portugal) Algarve Pro Racing	(United States) Steven Thomas (Australia) James Allen (Austria) René Binder	Gibson GK428 4.2 L V8	G	190	+4 Laps
15	LMP2	1	(France) Richard Mille Racing Team	(France) Lilou Wadoux (France) Sébastien Ogier (France) Charles Milesi	Oreca 07	G	189	+5 Laps
15	LMP2	1	(France) Richard Mille Racing Team	(France) Lilou Wadoux (France) Sébastien Ogier (France) Charles Milesi	Gibson GK428 4.2 L V8	G	189	+5 Laps
16	LMP2 Pro-Am	44	(Slovakia) ARC Bratislava	(Slovakia) Miroslav Konôpka (Switzerland) Mathias Beche (Netherlands) Tijmen van der Helm	Oreca 07	G	188	+6 Laps
16	LMP2 Pro-Am	44	(Slovakia) ARC Bratislava	(Slovakia) Miroslav Konôpka (Switzerland) Mathias Beche (Netherlands) Tijmen van der Helm	Gibson GK428 4.2 L V8	G	188	+6 Laps
17	**LMGTE Pro**	**92**	**(Germany) Porsche GT Team**	**(Denmark) Michael Christensen (France) Kevin Estre**	**Porsche 911 RSR-19**	M	**183**	**+11 Laps‡**
17	**LMGTE Pro**	**92**	**(Germany) Porsche GT Team**	**(Denmark) Michael Christensen (France) Kevin Estre**	**Porsche 4.2 L Flat-6**	M	**183**	**+11 Laps‡**
18	LMGTE Pro	64	(United States) Corvette Racing	(United States) Tommy Milner (United Kingdom) Nick Tandy	Chevrolet Corvette C8.R	M	183	+11 Laps
18	LMGTE Pro	64	(United States) Corvette Racing	(United States) Tommy Milner (United Kingdom) Nick Tandy	Chevrolet 5.5 L V8	M	183	+11 Laps
19	LMGTE Pro	91	(Germany) Porsche GT Team	(Italy) Gianmaria Bruni (Austria) Richard Lietz	Porsche 911 RSR-19	M	183	+11 Laps
19	LMGTE Pro	91	(Germany) Porsche GT Team	(Italy) Gianmaria Bruni (Austria) Richard Lietz	Porsche 4.2 L Flat-6	M	183	+11 Laps
20	LMGTE Pro	51	(Italy) AF Corse	(Italy) Alessandro Pier Guidi (United Kingdom) James Calado	Ferrari 488 GTE Evo	M	183	+11 Laps
20	LMGTE Pro	51	(Italy) AF Corse	(Italy) Alessandro Pier Guidi (United Kingdom) James Calado	Ferrari F154CB 3.9 L Turbo V8	M	183	+11 Laps
21	**LMGTE Am**	**98**	**(Canada) Northwest AMR**	**(Canada) Paul Dalla Lana (United Kingdom) David Pittard (Denmark) Nicki Thiim**	**Aston Martin Vantage AMR**	M	**180**	**+14 Laps‡**
21	**LMGTE Am**	**98**	**(Canada) Northwest AMR**	**(Canada) Paul Dalla Lana (United Kingdom) David Pittard (Denmark) Nicki Thiim**	**Aston Martin 4.0 L Turbo V8**	M	**180**	**+14 Laps‡**
22	LMGTE Pro	52	(Italy) AF Corse	(Spain) Miguel Molina (Italy) Antonio Fuoco	Ferrari 488 GTE Evo	M	180	+14 Laps
22	LMGTE Pro	52	(Italy) AF Corse	(Spain) Miguel Molina (Italy) Antonio Fuoco	Ferrari F154CB 3.9 L Turbo V8	M	180	+14 Laps
23	LMGTE Am	33	(United Kingdom) TF Sport	(United States) Ben Keating (France) Florian Latorre (Denmark) Marco Sørensen	Aston Martin Vantage AMR	M	180	+14 Laps
23	LMGTE Am	33	(United Kingdom) TF Sport	(United States) Ben Keating (France) Florian Latorre (Denmark) Marco Sørensen	Aston Martin 4.0 L Turbo V8	M	180	+14 Laps
24	LMGTE Am	56	(Germany) Team Project 1	(United States) Brendan Iribe (United Kingdom) Olliver Millroy (United Kingdom) Ben Barnicoat	Porsche 911 RSR-19	M	180	+14 Laps
24	LMGTE Am	56	(Germany) Team Project 1	(United States) Brendan Iribe (United Kingdom) Olliver Millroy (United Kingdom) Ben Barnicoat	Porsche 4.2 L Flat-6	M	180	+14 Laps
25	LMGTE Am	77	(Germany) Dempsey-Proton Racing	(Germany) Christian Ried (United Kingdom) Sebastian Priaulx (United Kingdom) Harry Tincknell	Porsche 911 RSR-19	M	180	+14 Laps
25	LMGTE Am	77	(Germany) Dempsey-Proton Racing	(Germany) Christian Ried (United Kingdom) Sebastian Priaulx (United Kingdom) Harry Tincknell	Porsche 4.2 L Flat-6	M	180	+14 Laps
26	LMGTE Am	85	(Italy) Iron Dames	(Switzerland) Rahel Frey (Denmark) Michelle Gatting (Belgium) Sarah Bovy	Ferrari 488 GTE Evo	M	179	+15 Laps
26	LMGTE Am	85	(Italy) Iron Dames	(Switzerland) Rahel Frey (Denmark) Michelle Gatting (Belgium) Sarah Bovy	Ferrari F154CB 3.9 L Turbo V8	M	179	+15 Laps
27	LMGTE Am	777	(Japan) D'Station Racing	(Japan) Satoshi Hoshino (Japan) Tomonobu Fujii (United Kingdom) Charlie Fagg	Aston Martin Vantage AMR	M	179	+15 Laps
27	LMGTE Am	777	(Japan) D'Station Racing	(Japan) Satoshi Hoshino (Japan) Tomonobu Fujii (United Kingdom) Charlie Fagg	Aston Martin 4.0 L Turbo V8	M	179	+15 Laps
28	LMGTE Am	21	(Italy) AF Corse	(United States) Simon Mann (Switzerland) Christoph Ulrich (Finland) Toni Vilander	Ferrari 488 GTE Evo	M	178	+16 Laps
28	LMGTE Am	21	(Italy) AF Corse	(United States) Simon Mann (Switzerland) Christoph Ulrich (Finland) Toni Vilander	Ferrari F154CB 3.9 L Turbo V8	M	178	+16 Laps
29	LMGTE Am	60	(Italy) Iron Lynx	(Italy) Claudio Schiavoni (Italy) Matteo Cressoni (Italy) Giancarlo Fisichella	Ferrari 488 GTE Evo	M	178	+16 Laps
29	LMGTE Am	60	(Italy) Iron Lynx	(Italy) Claudio Schiavoni (Italy) Matteo Cressoni (Italy) Giancarlo Fisichella	Ferrari F154CB 3.9 L Turbo V8	M	178	+16 Laps
30	LMGTE Am	54	(Italy) AF Corse	(Switzerland) Thomas Flohr (Italy) Francesco Castellacci (New Zealand) Nick Cassidy	Ferrari 488 GTE Evo	M	178	+16 Laps
30	LMGTE Am	54	(Italy) AF Corse	(Switzerland) Thomas Flohr (Italy) Francesco Castellacci (New Zealand) Nick Cassidy	Ferrari F154CB 3.9 L Turbo V8	M	178	+16 Laps
31	LMP2	34	(Poland) Inter Europol Competition	(Poland) Jakub Śmiechowski (United Kingdom) Alex Brundle (Mexico) Esteban Gutiérrez	Oreca 07	G	174	+20 Laps
31	LMP2	34	(Poland) Inter Europol Competition	(Poland) Jakub Śmiechowski (United Kingdom) Alex Brundle (Mexico) Esteban Gutiérrez	Gibson GK428 4.2 L V8	G	174	+20 Laps
32	LMGTE Am	88	(Germany) Dempsey-Proton Racing	(United States) Fred Poordad (United States) Patrick Lindsey (France) Julien Andlauer	Porsche 911 RSR-19	M	169	+25 Laps
32	LMGTE Am	88	(Germany) Dempsey-Proton Racing	(United States) Fred Poordad (United States) Patrick Lindsey (France) Julien Andlauer	Porsche 4.2 L Flat-6	M	169	+25 Laps
33	LMP2	10	(United Kingdom) Vector Sport	(Switzerland) Nico Müller (Republic of Ireland) Ryan Cullen (Germany) Mike Rockenfeller	Oreca 07	G	157	+37 Laps
33	LMP2	10	(United Kingdom) Vector Sport	(Switzerland) Nico Müller (Republic of Ireland) Ryan Cullen (Germany) Mike Rockenfeller	Gibson GK428 4.2 L V8	G	157	+37 Laps
NC	LMGTE Am	71	(Italy) Spirit of Race	(France) Franck Dezoteux (France) Pierre Ragues (France) Gabriel Aubry	Ferrari 488 GTE Evo	M	122	Not Classified
NC	LMGTE Am	71	(Italy) Spirit of Race	(France) Franck Dezoteux (France) Pierre Ragues (France) Gabriel Aubry	Ferrari F154CB 3.9 L Turbo V8	M	122	Not Classified
NC	LMGTE Am	46	(Germany) Team Project 1	(Italy) Matteo Cairoli (Denmark) Mikkel O. Pedersen (Switzerland) Nicolas Leutwiler	Porsche 911 RSR-19	M	86	Not Classified
NC	LMGTE Am	46	(Germany) Team Project 1	(Italy) Matteo Cairoli (Denmark) Mikkel O. Pedersen (Switzerland) Nicolas Leutwiler	Porsche 4.2 L Flat-6	M	86	Not Classified
DNF	Hypercar	7	(Japan) Toyota Gazoo Racing	(United Kingdom) Mike Conway (Japan) Kamui Kobayashi (Argentina) José María López	Toyota GR010 Hybrid	M	110	Crash
DNF	Hypercar	7	(Japan) Toyota Gazoo Racing	(United Kingdom) Mike Conway (Japan) Kamui Kobayashi (Argentina) José María López	Toyota H8909 3.5 L Turbo V6	M	110	Crash

== Standings after the race ==
2022 Hypercar World Endurance Drivers' Championship

Pos	+/-	Driver	Points
1		(Brazil) André Negrão (France) Matthieu Vaxivière (France) Nicolas Lapierre	39
2		(New Zealand) Brendon Hartley (Japan) Ryo Hirakawa (Switzerland) Sebastien Buemi	27
3		(France) Olivier Pla (France) Romain Dumas (United States) Ryan Briscoe	23
4		(Argentina) José María López (Japan) Kamui Kobayashi (United Kingdom) Mike Conway	0

2022 Hypercar World Endurance Manufacturers' Championship

Pos	+/-	Team	Points
1		(France) Alpine	39
2		(Japan) Toyota	27
3		(United States) Glickenhaus	23

2022 World Endurance GTE Drivers' Championship

Pos	+/-	Driver	Points
1		(France) Kevin Estre (Denmark) Michael Christensen	39
2		(United Kingdom) Nick Tandy (United States) Tommy Milner	27
3		(Italy) Gianmaria Bruni (Austria) Richard Lietz	23
4		(Italy) Alessandro Pier Guidi (United Kingdom) James Calado	18
5		(United Kingdom) David Pittard (Denmark) Nicki Thiim (Canada) Paul Dalla Lana	15

2022 World Endurance GTE Manufacturers' Championship

Pos	+/-	Team	Points
1		(Germany) Porsche	62
2		(Italy) Ferrari	33
3		(United States) Chevrolet	27

- Note: Only the top five positions are included for the Drivers' Championship standings.
