= Pipo P21 engine =

Overview
- Manufacturer: Pipo Moteurs
- Production: 2021–2023

Layout
- Configuration: V8, twin-turbocharged, 90° cylinder angle
- Displacement: 3.5 L (3,496 cc)
- Cylinder bore: 85 mm (3.35 in)
- Piston stroke: 77 mm (3.03 in)
- Cylinder block material: Aluminium
- Cylinder head material: Aluminium
- Valvetrain: 32-valve (four-valves per cylinder), DOHC
- Valvetrain drive system: Chain
- Compression ratio: 12:1

RPM range
- Max. engine speed: 8,000

Combustion
- Turbocharger: Garrett Motion
- Fuel system: Gasoline direct injection
- Management: Bosch MS7
- Fuel type: TotalEnergies E10
- Oil system: Dry sump
- Cooling system: mechanically water cooled

Output
- Power output: 671 hp (500 kW; 680 PS)
- Torque output: 820 N⋅m (605 lb⋅ft)

Dimensions
- Length: 530 mm (20.87 in)
- Width: 750 mm (29.53 in)
- Height: 574 mm (22.60 in)

The Pipo P21 engine (alternatively branded as Glickenhaus by Pipo Moteurs) is a twin-turbocharged, four-stroke, 3.5-liter, V8 racing engine, designed and produced by Pipo Moteurs for use in the Glickenhaus SCG 007 LMH, from 2021 to 2023.

== Overview ==
The engine is designed by French engine tuner and manufacturer, Pipo Moteurs. They used their previous experience with inline-4 World Rally Championship engines as a reference to design the new motor. However, due to the different rules between the series, there was only two components that were carried over, the 96 mm (3.78 in) bore spacing and cylinder head stud pattern. The engine has a crankshaft height of 96 mm (3.78 in), a deck height of 219 mm (8.62 in) and a bank offset of 19 mm (0.75 in). The firing order of the P21 is 1-8-3-6-4-5-2-7. Pipo Moteurs decided to use a symmetrical turbo for packaging purposes inside the Glickenhaus SCG 007 LMH. Garrett Motion was chosen as the supplier for the two reverse-rotation turbochargers.

The engine was chosen to power a reworked version of the Vanwall Vandervell 680 in 2023 before Vanwall Racing's entry was excluded from the 2024 FIA World Endurance Championship.

== Applications ==
- Glickenhaus SCG 007 LMH
- Vanwall Vandervell 680
