= Vanwall Vandervell 680 =

Sports prototype racing car built by Vanwall Racing Team

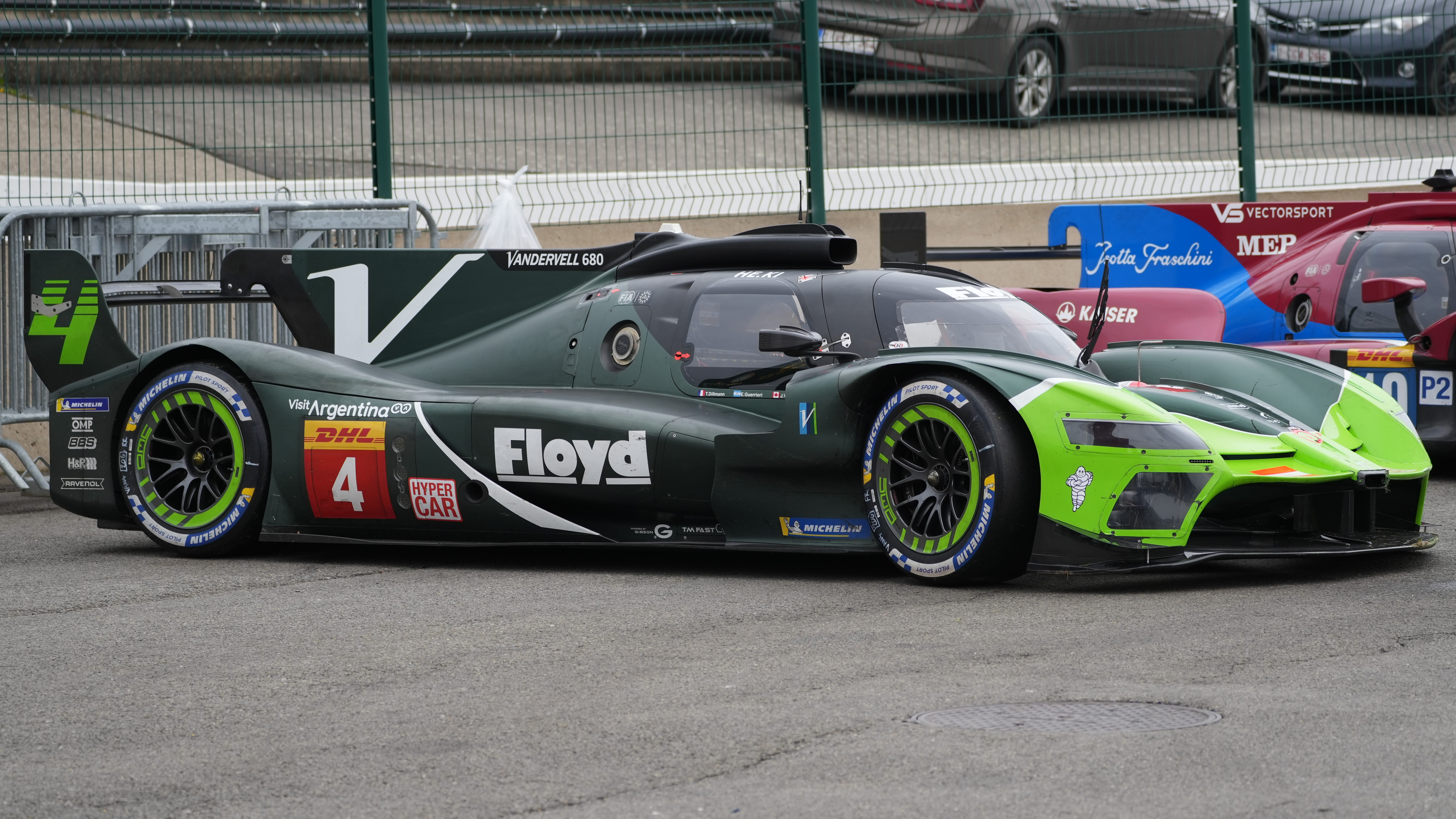
- Jacques Villeneuve driving the Vandervell 680 at the 2023 6 Hours of Spa-Francorchamps
- Category: Le Mans Hypercar
- Constructor: Vanwall
- Designers: Julian Thiele (Head of Design); Edgar Refenius (Mechanical Design Engineer); Eric Zenner (Aerodynamicist); Felix Nöcker (Composite Design Engineer)
- Predecessor: ENSO CLM P1/01

Technical specifications
- Chassis: Carbon fibre composite monocoque
- Engine: Gibson GL458 4.5 litre V8 naturally-aspirated, 90° cylinder angle mid-engined, longitudinally mounted
- Torque: 410 lb⋅ft (556 N⋅m)
- Transmission: Xtrac P1159C 6-speed sequential manual
- Power: 500 kW (680 PS; 671 hp)
- Weight: 1,030 kg (2,270 lb)
- Fuel: TotalEnergies
- Lubricants: Motul
- Brakes: AP Racing carbon 380/355mm with AP Monobloc 6-piston calipers
- Tyres: Michelin slicks with BBS one-piece forged alloys, 29/71-18 front and 34/71-18 rear

Competition history
- Notable entrants: (Austria) Vanwall Racing Team
- Notable drivers: (Canada) Jacques Villeneuve; (Argentina) Esteban Guerrieri; (France) Tom Dillmann; (France) Tristan Vautier; (Brazil) João Paulo de Oliveira; (Australia) Ryan Briscoe
- Debut: 2023 1000 Miles of Sebring
- Last event: 2023 8 Hours of Bahrain
Races	Wins	Podiums	Poles	F/Laps
7	0	0	0	0
- Teams' Championships: 0
- Constructors' Championships: 0
- Drivers' Championships: 0

The Vanwall Vandervell 680 is a sports prototype racing car designed and built by Vanwall Racing Team. It is designed to the Le Mans Hypercar regulations and made its debut in the 2023 FIA World Endurance Championship at the season-opening 1000 Miles of Sebring.

== Background ==
The earliest renderings of the car were presented by ByKolles Racing on 2019, who revealed their intentions to race under the newly established Le Mans Hypercar regulations. ByKolles would be one of the first teams to commit to the new class, announcing in June 2019 that they would race under the new formula in the FIA World Endurance Championship that would come into effect in the 2021 season. They also confirmed development on a road car variant.

ByKolles confirmed in May 2020 that they would be using the 4.5-litre Gibson GL458 naturally-aspirated V8 previously used on their CLM P1/01 LMP1. The team officially unveiled renderings of their new Hypercar on 18 September 2020, initially dubbed the PMC Project LMH. ByKolles confirmed that three versions of the car, a race car, a track day car, and a hybrid road car, were in development at their base in Greding, Germany.

Initially projected to race in the 2021 FIA World Endurance Championship, ByKolles later pulled out of the entry list, and in turn, pushed their debut back in favour of next season, with founder Colin Kolles stating that they were "not happy with some of the things going on with the WEC organisation." The team experienced further delays ahead of 2022 as they would be rejected by the Fédération Internationale de l'Automobile and Automobile Club de l'Ouest due to their car not completing the homologation process.

A running prototype was revealed by ByKolles in 2022, completing its first shakedown at the Zweibrücken Airport in Germany, and carrying the branding of British Formula One team Vanwall. ByKolles' use of the branding was challenged by British continuity project Vanwall 1958, who had planned to build cars for competition using the original Vanwall marque, although the name had been registered by Colin Kolles' agents PMC before its launch. The team underwent a formal rebrand as Vanwall, and named their car the Vanwall Vandervell 680 after the founder of the original marque Tony Vandervell, and on 12 January 2023, the team was approved by both governing bodies to race in the 2023 FIA World Endurance Championship. In February 2023, the team's use of the marque was put into question after losing a European Union Intellectual Property Office case brought by the Vanwall 1958 project.

== Competition history ==
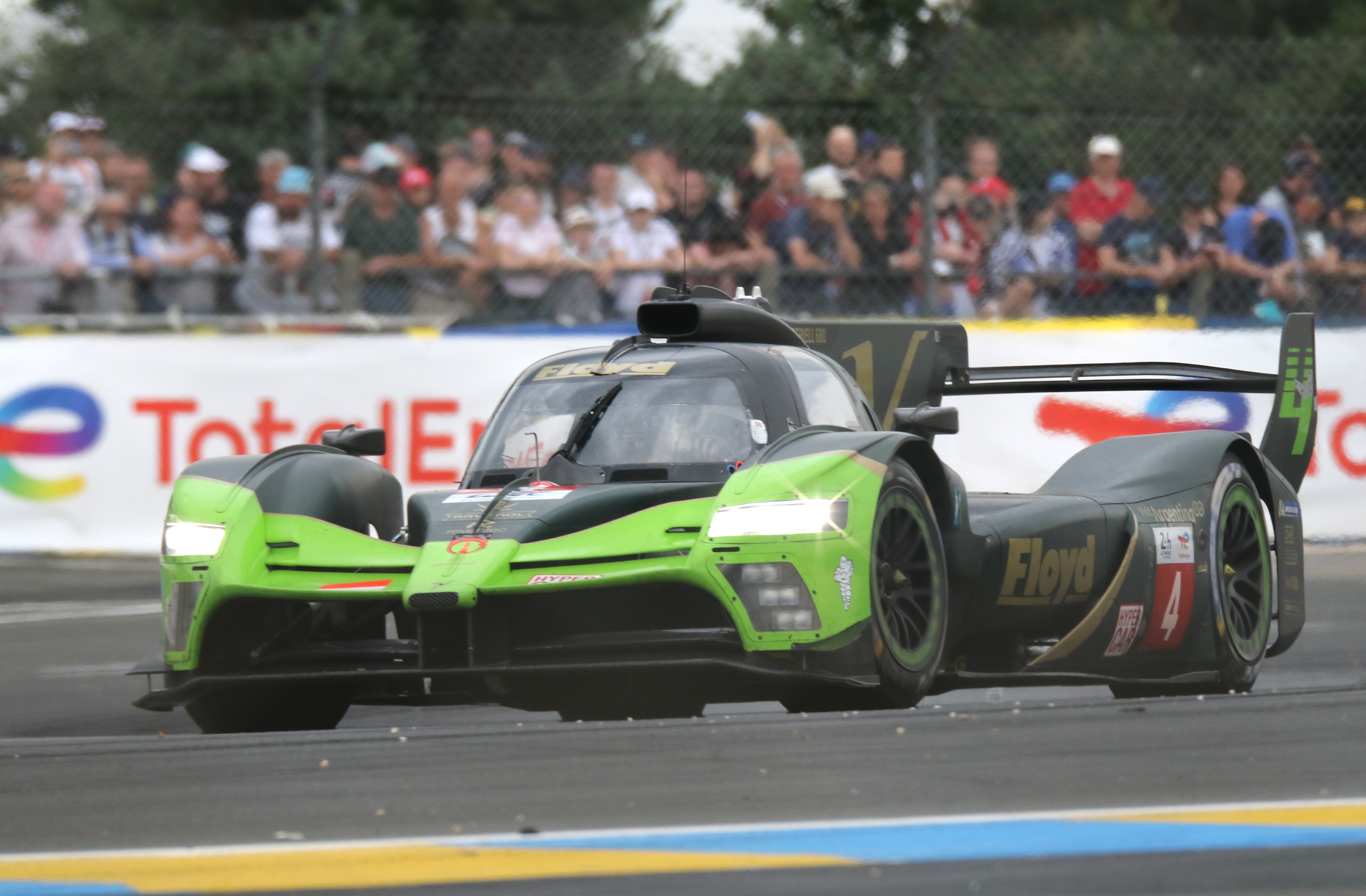
The No. 4 Vanwall Vandervell 680 at the 2023 24 Hours of Le Mans.

The Vandervell 680 completed its debut at the 2023 1000 Miles of Sebring. Tom Dillmann, Esteban Guerrieri, and 1997 Formula One World Champion Jacques Villeneuve were confirmed to be driving the car. Despite starting last in class, Vanwall were able to take advantage of misfortunes from other teams and finish the race in 8th.

In the second round at the 2023 6 Hours of Portimão, the team would again start the race last in class with the Vandervell 680. The car would fail to make it to the finish and retire from the race as it had suffered a suspected brake failure, causing Villeneuve to crash into a safety barrier. The team would start from the back for a third time in the third round at the 2023 6 Hours of Spa-Francorchamps. A spin from Guerrieri led to a full-course yellow, followed by Villeneuve crashing into the rear of AF Corse's Ferrari 488 GTE Evo, causing another retirement. Following the race, Villeneuve would be dropped by Vanwall and replaced by Tristan Vautier. Villeneuve expressed disappointment over the decision, stating that he had not received any communication about his dismissal, and that he had still been contracted to race at the 2023 24 Hours of Le Mans.

At Le Mans, the Vandervell 680 would suffer a loss of power due to the track's climate. During the race, the car was dogged with suspension issues early on, with clutch issues and an engine failure sending the car into its third retirement in a row. Following this race, longstanding Vanwall driver Tom Dillmann departed the team and was replaced by João Paulo de Oliveira. The car saw temperature issues due to climate again at the 2023 6 Hours of Monza, experiencing braking issues during pit stops, requiring its brake ducts to be cleared at each stop. The car started last and finished last in class, 20th overall. The team would finish below the top 10 in the final two races at the 2023 6 Hours of Fuji and the 2023 8 Hours of Bahrain. In the latter event, Ryan Briscoe joined the team, replacing de Oliveira.

Following the 2023 season, Vanwall struck a deal with Pipo Moteurs at the end of October to use their 3.5-litre P21 twin-turbocharged V8 in the Vandervell 680 before it was excluded from the 2024 FIA World Endurance Championship due to a lack of competitiveness. Team founder Colin Kolles stated that the company would move forward with their plans of producing two all-electric sports cars, the Vanwall Vandervell S and Vanwall Vandervell S Plus. The team have continued to develop the Vandervell 680 with the aim of returning to the FIA World Endurance Championship in future seasons.

On 11 December 2025, Vanwall announced that they intend to enter the Hypercar class of the Asian Le Mans Series in the 2026/2027 season, planning to use the reworked version of the car.

== Road car version ==
The road car version of the Vandervell 680 was unveiled on 16 September 2022 as a test mule, called the Vanwall Vandervell 1000. According to founder Colin Kolles, the road car is powered by a different engine to the race car, although engine information was not specified.

== Complete World Endurance Championship results ==
Results in bold indicate pole position. Results in italics indicate fastest lap.

Year	Entrant	Class	Drivers	No.	1	2	3	4	5	6	7	Points	Pos
2023	(Austria) Floyd Vanwall Racing Team	Hypercar			SEB	POR	SPA	LMS	MNZ	FUJ	BHR	10	7th
2023	(Austria) Floyd Vanwall Racing Team	Hypercar	(Argentina) Esteban Guerrieri	4	8	Ret	Ret	Ret	12	11	12	10	7th
2023	(Austria) Floyd Vanwall Racing Team	Hypercar	(France) Tom Dillmann	4	8	Ret	Ret	Ret				10	7th
2023	(Austria) Floyd Vanwall Racing Team	Hypercar	(Canada) Jacques Villeneuve	4	8	Ret	Ret					10	7th
2023	(Austria) Floyd Vanwall Racing Team	Hypercar	(France) Tristan Vautier	4				Ret	12	11	12	10	7th
2023	(Austria) Floyd Vanwall Racing Team	Hypercar	(Brazil) João Paulo de Oliveira	4					12	11		10	7th
2023	(Austria) Floyd Vanwall Racing Team	Hypercar	(Australia) Ryan Briscoe	4							12	10	7th
