= 2023 8 Hours of Bahrain =

Endurance motor race

Coordinates: 26°1′57″N 50°30′38″E

Event information
- Round 7 of 7 in the 2023 FIA World Endurance Championship
- Date: 4 November 2023
- Location: Sakhir
- Venue: Bahrain International Circuit
- Duration: 8 Hours

Results
- Laps completed: 249
- Distance (km): 1347.588
- Distance (miles): 837.387
- Hypercar

Pole position
- Time: 1:46.564
- Team: (Japan) Toyota Gazoo Racing

Winners
- Team: (Japan) Toyota Gazoo Racing
- Drivers: (Switzerland) Sébastien Buemi (New Zealand) Brendon Hartley (Japan) Ryo Hirakawa
- LMP2

Winners
- Team: (Belgium) Team WRT
- Drivers: (Angola) Rui Andrade (Switzerland) Louis Delétraz (Poland) Robert Kubica
- LMGTE Am

Winners
- Team: (Italy) Iron Dames
- Drivers: (Belgium) Sarah Bovy (Switzerland) Rahel Frey (Denmark) Michelle Gatting

The 2023 Bapco Energies 8 Hours of Bahrain was an endurance sportscar racing event held on 4 November 2023, as the seventh and final round of the 2023 FIA World Endurance Championship. It was the twelfth running of the event, and the fifth running in an extended 8 hours format.

The event is notable as it featured the first class win for an all-female driving crew – the Iron Dames Porsche driven by Sarah Bovy, Rahel Frey and Michelle Gatting won the LMGTE Am category.

== Background ==
On 26 October 2023, the FIA published the Balance of Performance (BoP) for the Hypercar and LMGTE AM classes. In Hypercar, the Cadillac and Porsche both lost 7 kilograms of weight. They also both lost 1 MJ of maximum stint energy. For all other cars in the class, the BoP remained the same as it was during the Fuji round. In LMGTE Am, the Aston Martin received a fuel tank increase of 2 litres and an 0.04 increase in engine power. The Corvette received a fuel tank decrease of 2 litres, and a decrease of 0.6 mm for the maximum size of the air restrictor. For the Porsche and Ferrari, the BoP remained the same as it was during the Fuji round.

== Entry list ==
There were 36 cars entered into the event: 12 Hypercars, 11 LMP2 cars, and 13 LMGTE Am cars. In Hypercar, Ryan Briscoe replaced João Paulo de Oliveira in the No. 4 Floyd Vanwall Racing Team machine. Furthermore, Nico Müller returned to the No. 94 Peugeot TotalEnergies machine, after missing the Fuji round due to an injury.

In LMP2, Mirko Bortolotti returned to the No. 63 Prema Racing machine, and Tom Blomqvist returned to the No. 23 United Autosports machine. In LMGTE Am, Franck Dezoteux joined the No. 21 AF Corse machine, with Liam Talbot replacing Satoshi Hoshino in the No. 777 D'Station Racing machine. Furthermore, Esteban Masson joined the No. 57 Kessel Racing machine, replacing Ritomo Miyata, whilst Daniel Serra also returned after missing the previous two rounds.

== Schedule ==
| Date | Time (local: AST) | Event |
|---|---|---|
| Thursday, 2 November | 12:15 | Free Practice 1 |
| Thursday, 2 November | 17:30 | Free Practice 2 |
| Friday, 3 November | 12:00 | Free Practice 3 |
| Friday, 3 November | 16:15 | Qualifying - LMGTE Am |
| Friday, 3 November | 16:40 | Qualifying - LMP2 |
| Friday, 3 November | 17:05 | Qualifying - Hypercar |
| Saturday, 4 November | 14:00 | Race |

== Free practice ==
- Only the fastest car in each class is shown.

| Free Practice 1 | Class | No. | Entrant | Driver | Time |
|---|---|---|---|---|---|
| Free Practice 1 | Hypercar | 7 | (Japan) Toyota Gazoo Racing | (Japan) Kamui Kobayashi | 1:49.856 |
| Free Practice 1 | LMP2 | 22 | (United Kingdom) United Autosports | (Portugal) Filipe Albuquerque | 1:54.100 |
| Free Practice 1 | LMGTE Am | 777 | (Japan) D'Station Racing | (Japan) Tomonobu Fujii | 1:59.516 |
| Free Practice 2 | Class | No. | Entrant | Driver | Time |
| Free Practice 2 | Hypercar | 7 | (Japan) Toyota Gazoo Racing | (Japan) Kamui Kobayashi | 1:46.851 |
| Free Practice 2 | LMP2 | 22 | (United Kingdom) United Autosports | (Portugal) Filipe Albuquerque | 1:52.850 |
| Free Practice 2 | LMGTE Am | 57 | (Switzerland) Kessel Racing | (Brazil) Daniel Serra | 1:58.246 |
| Free Practice 3 | Class | No. | Entrant | Driver | Time |
| Free Practice 3 | Hypercar | 2 | (United States) Cadillac Racing | (United Kingdom) Alex Lynn | 1:49.512 |
| Free Practice 3 | LMP2 | 23 | (United Kingdom) United Autosports | (United Kingdom) Tom Blomqvist | 1:53.661 |
| Free Practice 3 | LMGTE Am | 56 | (Germany) Project 1 – AO | (Italy) Matteo Cairoli | 1:58.214 |

== Qualifying ==
Pole position winners in each class are marked in bold.

| Pos | Class | No. | Team | Time | Gap | Grid |
|---|---|---|---|---|---|---|
| 1 | **Hypercar** | **8** | **(Japan) Toyota Gazoo Racing** | **1:46.564** | - | **1** |
| 2 | Hypercar | 7 | (Japan) Toyota Gazoo Racing | 1:47.053 | +0.489 | 2 |
| 3 | Hypercar | 2 | (United States) Cadillac Racing | 1:47.265 | +0.701 | 3 |
| 4 | Hypercar | 6 | (Germany) Porsche Penske Motorsport | 1:47.712 | +1.148 | 4 |
| 5 | Hypercar | 50 | (Italy) Ferrari AF Corse | 1:47.739 | +1.175 | 5 |
| 6 | Hypercar | 51 | (Italy) Ferrari AF Corse | 1:47.828 | +1.264 | 6 |
| 7 | Hypercar | 5 | (Germany) Porsche Penske Motorsport | 1:47.946 | +1.382 | 7 |
| 8 | Hypercar | 99 | (Germany) Proton Competition | 1:47.964 | +1.400 | 8 |
| 9 | Hypercar | 38 | (United Kingdom) Hertz Team Jota | 1:48.555 | +1.991 | 9 |
| 10 | Hypercar | 93 | (France) Peugeot TotalEnergies | 1:48.987 | +2.423 | 10 |
| 11 | Hypercar | 94 | (France) Peugeot TotalEnergies | 1:49.502 | +2.938 | 11 |
| 12 | Hypercar | 4 | (Austria) Floyd Vanwall Racing Team | 1:50.682 | +4.118 | 12 |
| 13 | **LMP2** | **23** | **(United Kingdom) United Autosports** | **1:52.290** | **+5.726** | **13** |
| 14 | LMP2 | 36 | (France) Alpine Elf Team | 1:52.561 | +5.997 | 14 |
| 15 | LMP2 | 31 | (Belgium) Team WRT | 1:52.898 | +6.334 | 15 |
| 16 | LMP2 | 10 | (United Kingdom) Vector Sport | 1:52.903 | 6.339 | 16 |
| 17 | LMP2 | 22 | (United Kingdom) United Autosports | 1:52.992 | +6.428 | 17 |
| 18 | LMP2 | 9 | (Italy) Prema Racing | 1:53.033 | +6.469 | 18 |
| 19 | LMP2 | 34 | (Poland) Inter Europol Competition | 1:53.086 | +6.522 | 19 |
| 20 | LMP2 | 63 | (Italy) Prema Racing | 1:53.191 | +6.627 | 20 |
| 21 | LMP2 | 28 | (United Kingdom) Jota | 1:53.320 | +6.756 | 21 |
| 22 | LMP2 | 41 | (Belgium) Team WRT | 1:53.580 | +7.016 | 22 |
| 23 | LMP2 | 35 | (France) Alpine Elf Team | 1:54.023 | +7.459 | 23 |
| 24 | **LMGTE Am** | **85** | **(Italy) Iron Dames** | **1:58.692** | **+12.128** | **24** |
| 25 | LMGTE Am | 777 | (Japan) D'Station Racing | 1:58.982 | +12.418 | 25 |
| 26 | LMGTE Am | 25 | (Oman) ORT by TF | 1:59.161 | +12.597 | 26 |
| 27 | LMGTE Am | 57 | (Switzerland) Kessel Racing | 1:59.162 | +12.598 | 27 |
| 28 | LMGTE Am | 33 | (United States) Corvette Racing | 1:59.412 | +12.848 | 28 |
| 29 | LMGTE Am | 98 | (Canada) NorthWest AMR | 1:59.683 | +13.119 | 29 |
| 30 | LMGTE Am | 54 | (Italy) AF Corse | 1:59.761 | +13.197 | 30 |
| 31 | LMGTE Am | 77 | (Germany) Dempsey-Proton Racing | 2:00.063 | +13.499 | 31 |
| 32 | LMGTE Am | 83 | (Italy) Richard Mille AF Corse | 2:00.279 | +13.715 | 32 |
| 33 | LMGTE Am | 56 | (Germany) Project 1 – AO | 2:00.446 | +13.882 | 33 |
| 34 | LMGTE Am | 86 | (United Kingdom) GR Racing | 2:01.275 | +14.711 | 34 |
| 35 | LMGTE Am | 60 | (Italy) Iron Lynx | 2:01.547 | +14.983 | 35 |
| 36 | LMGTE Am | 21 | (Italy) AF Corse | 2:02.646 | +16.082 | 36 |

== Race ==
The minimum number of laps for classification (70% of overall winning car's distance) was 174 laps. Class winners are in bold and ‡.

| Pos | Class | No | Team | Drivers | Chassis | Tyre | Laps | Time/Retired |
| Pos | Class | No | Team | Drivers | Engine | Tyre | Laps | Time/Retired |
|---|---|---|---|---|---|---|---|---|
| 1 | **Hypercar** | **8** | **(Japan) Toyota Gazoo Racing** | **(Switzerland) Sébastien Buemi (New Zealand) Brendon Hartley (Japan) Ryo Hirakawa** | **Toyota GR010 Hybrid** | M | **249** | **8:01:25.308‡** |
| 1 | **Hypercar** | **8** | **(Japan) Toyota Gazoo Racing** | **(Switzerland) Sébastien Buemi (New Zealand) Brendon Hartley (Japan) Ryo Hirakawa** | **Toyota H8909 3.5 L Turbo V6** | M | **249** | **8:01:25.308‡** |
| 2 | Hypercar | 7 | (Japan) Toyota Gazoo Racing | (United Kingdom) Mike Conway (Japan) Kamui Kobayashi (Argentina) José María López | Toyota GR010 Hybrid | M | 249 | +47.516 |
| 2 | Hypercar | 7 | (Japan) Toyota Gazoo Racing | (United Kingdom) Mike Conway (Japan) Kamui Kobayashi (Argentina) José María López | Toyota H8909 3.5 L Turbo V6 | M | 249 | +47.516 |
| 3 | Hypercar | 50 | (Italy) Ferrari AF Corse | (Italy) Antonio Fuoco (Spain) Miguel Molina (Denmark) Nicklas Nielsen | Ferrari 499P | M | 249 | +1:36.286 |
| 3 | Hypercar | 50 | (Italy) Ferrari AF Corse | (Italy) Antonio Fuoco (Spain) Miguel Molina (Denmark) Nicklas Nielsen | Ferrari F163 3.0 L Turbo V6 | M | 249 | +1:36.286 |
| 4 | Hypercar | 38 | (United Kingdom) Hertz Team Jota | (Portugal) António Félix da Costa (United Kingdom) Will Stevens (China) Yifei Ye | Porsche 963 | M | 249 | +1:37.248 |
| 4 | Hypercar | 38 | (United Kingdom) Hertz Team Jota | (Portugal) António Félix da Costa (United Kingdom) Will Stevens (China) Yifei Ye | Porsche 9RD 4.6 L Turbo V8 | M | 249 | +1:37.248 |
| 5 | Hypercar | 6 | (Germany) Porsche Penske Motorsport | (France) Kévin Estre (Germany) André Lotterer (Belgium) Laurens Vanthoor | Porsche 963 | M | 248 | +1 Lap |
| 5 | Hypercar | 6 | (Germany) Porsche Penske Motorsport | (France) Kévin Estre (Germany) André Lotterer (Belgium) Laurens Vanthoor | Porsche 9RD 4.6 L Turbo V8 | M | 248 | +1 Lap |
| 6 | Hypercar | 51 | (Italy) Ferrari AF Corse | (United Kingdom) James Calado (Italy) Antonio Giovinazzi (Italy) Alessandro Pier Guidi | Ferrari 499P | M | 248 | +1 Lap |
| 6 | Hypercar | 51 | (Italy) Ferrari AF Corse | (United Kingdom) James Calado (Italy) Antonio Giovinazzi (Italy) Alessandro Pier Guidi | Ferrari F163 3.0 L Turbo V6 | M | 248 | +1 Lap |
| 7 | Hypercar | 5 | (Germany) Porsche Penske Motorsport | (United States) Dane Cameron (Denmark) Michael Christensen (France) Frédéric Makowiecki | Porsche 963 | M | 247 | +2 Laps |
| 7 | Hypercar | 5 | (Germany) Porsche Penske Motorsport | (United States) Dane Cameron (Denmark) Michael Christensen (France) Frédéric Makowiecki | Porsche 9RD 4.6 L Turbo V8 | M | 247 | +2 Laps |
| 8 | Hypercar | 94 | (France) Peugeot TotalEnergies | (France) Loïc Duval (United States) Gustavo Menezes (Switzerland) Nico Müller | Peugeot 9X8 | M | 247 | +2 Laps |
| 8 | Hypercar | 94 | (France) Peugeot TotalEnergies | (France) Loïc Duval (United States) Gustavo Menezes (Switzerland) Nico Müller | Peugeot X6H 2.6 L Turbo V6 | M | 247 | +2 Laps |
| 9 | Hypercar | 93 | (France) Peugeot TotalEnergies | (Denmark) Mikkel Jensen (United Kingdom) Paul di Resta (France) Jean-Éric Vergne | Peugeot 9X8 | M | 247 | +2 Laps |
| 9 | Hypercar | 93 | (France) Peugeot TotalEnergies | (Denmark) Mikkel Jensen (United Kingdom) Paul di Resta (France) Jean-Éric Vergne | Peugeot X6H 2.6 L Turbo V6 | M | 247 | +2 Laps |
| 10 | Hypercar | 99 | (Germany) Proton Competition | (Italy) Gianmaria Bruni (Switzerland) Neel Jani (United Kingdom) Harry Tincknell | Porsche 963 | M | 247 | +2 Laps |
| 10 | Hypercar | 99 | (Germany) Proton Competition | (Italy) Gianmaria Bruni (Switzerland) Neel Jani (United Kingdom) Harry Tincknell | Porsche 9RD 4.6 L Turbo V8 | M | 247 | +2 Laps |
| 11 | Hypercar | 2 | (United States) Cadillac Racing | (New Zealand) Earl Bamber (United Kingdom) Alex Lynn (United Kingdom) Richard Westbrook | Cadillac V-Series.R | M | 246 | +3 Laps |
| 11 | Hypercar | 2 | (United States) Cadillac Racing | (New Zealand) Earl Bamber (United Kingdom) Alex Lynn (United Kingdom) Richard Westbrook | Cadillac LMC55R 5.5 L V8 | M | 246 | +3 Laps |
| 12 | **LMP2** | **41** | **(Belgium) Team WRT** | **(Angola) Rui Andrade (Switzerland) Louis Delétraz (Poland) Robert Kubica** | **Oreca 07** | G | **238** | **+11 Laps‡** |
| 12 | **LMP2** | **41** | **(Belgium) Team WRT** | **(Angola) Rui Andrade (Switzerland) Louis Delétraz (Poland) Robert Kubica** | **Gibson GK428 4.2 L V8** | G | **238** | **+11 Laps‡** |
| 13 | LMP2 | 31 | (Belgium) Team WRT | (Netherlands) Robin Frijns (Indonesia) Sean Gelael (Austria) Ferdinand Habsburg | Oreca 07 | G | 238 | +11 Laps |
| 13 | LMP2 | 31 | (Belgium) Team WRT | (Netherlands) Robin Frijns (Indonesia) Sean Gelael (Austria) Ferdinand Habsburg | Gibson GK428 4.2 L V8 | G | 238 | +11 Laps |
| 14 | LMP2 | 28 | (United Kingdom) Jota | (Brazil) Pietro Fittipaldi (Denmark) David Heinemeier Hansson (Denmark) Oliver Rasmussen | Oreca 07 | G | 238 | +11 Laps |
| 14 | LMP2 | 28 | (United Kingdom) Jota | (Brazil) Pietro Fittipaldi (Denmark) David Heinemeier Hansson (Denmark) Oliver Rasmussen | Gibson GK428 4.2 L V8 | G | 238 | +11 Laps |
| 15 | LMP2 | 9 | (Italy) Prema Racing | (Italy) Mirko Bortolotti (Romania) Filip Ugran (Netherlands) Bent Viscaal | Oreca 07 | G | 238 | +11 Laps |
| 15 | LMP2 | 9 | (Italy) Prema Racing | (Italy) Mirko Bortolotti (Romania) Filip Ugran (Netherlands) Bent Viscaal | Gibson GK428 4.2 L V8 | G | 238 | +11 Laps |
| 16 | LMP2 | 63 | (Italy) Prema Racing | (Switzerland) Mathias Beche; Daniil Kvyat (France) Doriane Pin | Oreca 07 | G | 237 | +12 Laps |
| 16 | LMP2 | 63 | (Italy) Prema Racing | (Switzerland) Mathias Beche; Daniil Kvyat (France) Doriane Pin | Gibson GK428 4.2 L V8 | G | 237 | +12 Laps |
| 17 | LMP2 | 34 | (Poland) Inter Europol Competition | (Spain) Albert Costa (Switzerland) Fabio Scherer (Poland) Jakub Śmiechowski | Oreca 07 | G | 237 | +12 Laps |
| 17 | LMP2 | 34 | (Poland) Inter Europol Competition | (Spain) Albert Costa (Switzerland) Fabio Scherer (Poland) Jakub Śmiechowski | Gibson GK428 4.2 L V8 | G | 237 | +12 Laps |
| 18 | LMP2 | 36 | (France) Alpine Elf Team | (France) Julien Canal (France) Charles Milesi (France) Matthieu Vaxivière | Oreca 07 | G | 237 | +12 Laps |
| 18 | LMP2 | 36 | (France) Alpine Elf Team | (France) Julien Canal (France) Charles Milesi (France) Matthieu Vaxivière | Gibson GK428 4.2 L V8 | G | 237 | +12 Laps |
| 19 | LMP2 | 23 | (United Kingdom) United Autosports | (United Kingdom) Tom Blomqvist (United Kingdom) Oliver Jarvis (United States) Josh Pierson | Oreca 07 | G | 237 | +12 Laps |
| 19 | LMP2 | 23 | (United Kingdom) United Autosports | (United Kingdom) Tom Blomqvist (United Kingdom) Oliver Jarvis (United States) Josh Pierson | Gibson GK428 4.2 L V8 | G | 237 | +12 Laps |
| 20 | LMP2 | 22 | (United Kingdom) United Autosports | (Portugal) Filipe Albuquerque (United Kingdom) Philip Hanson (United Kingdom) Frederick Lubin | Oreca 07 | G | 237 | +12 Laps |
| 20 | LMP2 | 22 | (United Kingdom) United Autosports | (Portugal) Filipe Albuquerque (United Kingdom) Philip Hanson (United Kingdom) Frederick Lubin | Gibson GK428 4.2 L V8 | G | 237 | +12 Laps |
| 21 | LMP2 | 35 | (France) Alpine Elf Team | (United Kingdom) Olli Caldwell (Brazil) André Negrão (Mexico) Memo Rojas | Oreca 07 | G | 236 | +13 Laps |
| 21 | LMP2 | 35 | (France) Alpine Elf Team | (United Kingdom) Olli Caldwell (Brazil) André Negrão (Mexico) Memo Rojas | Gibson GK428 4.2 L V8 | G | 236 | +13 Laps |
| 22 | **LMGTE Am** | **85** | **(Italy) Iron Dames** | **(Belgium) Sarah Bovy (Switzerland) Rahel Frey (Denmark) Michelle Gatting** | **Porsche 911 RSR-19** | M | **232** | **+17 Laps‡** |
| 22 | **LMGTE Am** | **85** | **(Italy) Iron Dames** | **(Belgium) Sarah Bovy (Switzerland) Rahel Frey (Denmark) Michelle Gatting** | **Porsche 4.2 L Flat-6** | M | **232** | **+17 Laps‡** |
| 23 | LMGTE Am | 777 | (Japan) D'Station Racing | (Japan) Tomonobu Fujii (United Kingdom) Casper Stevenson (Australia) Liam Talbot | Aston Martin Vantage AMR | M | 232 | +17 Laps |
| 23 | LMGTE Am | 777 | (Japan) D'Station Racing | (Japan) Tomonobu Fujii (United Kingdom) Casper Stevenson (Australia) Liam Talbot | Aston Martin 4.0 L Turbo V8 | M | 232 | +17 Laps |
| 24 | LMGTE Am | 98 | (Canada) NorthWest AMR | (United States) Ian James (Italy) Daniel Mancinelli (Spain) Alex Riberas | Aston Martin Vantage AMR | M | 232 | +17 Laps |
| 24 | LMGTE Am | 98 | (Canada) NorthWest AMR | (United States) Ian James (Italy) Daniel Mancinelli (Spain) Alex Riberas | Aston Martin 4.0 L Turbo V8 | M | 232 | +17 Laps |
| 25 | LMGTE Am | 54 | (Italy) AF Corse | (Italy) Francesco Castellacci (Switzerland) Thomas Flohr (Italy) Davide Rigon | Ferrari 488 GTE Evo | M | 232 | +17 Laps |
| 25 | LMGTE Am | 54 | (Italy) AF Corse | (Italy) Francesco Castellacci (Switzerland) Thomas Flohr (Italy) Davide Rigon | Ferrari F154CB 3.9 L Turbo V8 | M | 232 | +17 Laps |
| 26 | LMGTE Am | 57 | (Switzerland) Kessel Racing | (Japan) Takeshi Kimura (France) Esteban Masson (Brazil) Daniel Serra | Ferrari 488 GTE Evo | M | 232 | +17 Laps |
| 26 | LMGTE Am | 57 | (Switzerland) Kessel Racing | (Japan) Takeshi Kimura (France) Esteban Masson (Brazil) Daniel Serra | Ferrari F154CB 3.9 L Turbo V8 | M | 232 | +17 Laps |
| 27 | LMGTE Am | 77 | (Germany) Dempsey-Proton Racing | (France) Julien Andlauer (Germany) Christian Ried (Denmark) Mikkel O. Pedersen | Porsche 911 RSR-19 | M | 231 | +18 Laps |
| 27 | LMGTE Am | 77 | (Germany) Dempsey-Proton Racing | (France) Julien Andlauer (Germany) Christian Ried (Denmark) Mikkel O. Pedersen | Porsche 4.2 L Flat-6 | M | 231 | +18 Laps |
| 28 | LMGTE Am | 33 | (United States) Corvette Racing | (Netherlands) Nicky Catsburg (United States) Ben Keating (Argentina) Nicolás Varrone | Chevrolet Corvette C8.R | M | 231 | +18 Laps |
| 28 | LMGTE Am | 33 | (United States) Corvette Racing | (Netherlands) Nicky Catsburg (United States) Ben Keating (Argentina) Nicolás Varrone | Chevrolet 5.5 L V8 | M | 231 | +18 Laps |
| 29 | LMGTE Am | 86 | (United Kingdom) GR Racing | (United Kingdom) Ben Barker (Italy) Riccardo Pera (United Kingdom) Michael Wainwright | Porsche 911 RSR-19 | M | 231 | +18 Laps |
| 29 | LMGTE Am | 86 | (United Kingdom) GR Racing | (United Kingdom) Ben Barker (Italy) Riccardo Pera (United Kingdom) Michael Wainwright | Porsche 4.2 L Flat-6 | M | 231 | +18 Laps |
| 30 | LMGTE Am | 83 | (Italy) Richard Mille AF Corse | (Argentina) Luis Pérez Companc (Italy) Alessio Rovera (France) Lilou Wadoux | Ferrari 488 GTE Evo | M | 231 | +18 Laps |
| 30 | LMGTE Am | 83 | (Italy) Richard Mille AF Corse | (Argentina) Luis Pérez Companc (Italy) Alessio Rovera (France) Lilou Wadoux | Ferrari F154CB 3.9 L Turbo V8 | M | 231 | +18 Laps |
| 31 | LMGTE Am | 56 | (Germany) Project 1 – AO | (Italy) Matteo Cairoli (United States) P.J. Hyett (United States) Gunnar Jeannette | Porsche 911 RSR-19 | M | 230 | +19 Laps |
| 31 | LMGTE Am | 56 | (Germany) Project 1 – AO | (Italy) Matteo Cairoli (United States) P.J. Hyett (United States) Gunnar Jeannette | Porsche 4.2 L Flat-6 | M | 230 | +19 Laps |
| 32 | LMGTE Am | 21 | (Italy) AF Corse | (Japan) Kei Cozzolino (France) Franck Dezoteux (United States) Simon Mann | Ferrari 488 GTE Evo | M | 229 | +20 Laps |
| 32 | LMGTE Am | 21 | (Italy) AF Corse | (Japan) Kei Cozzolino (France) Franck Dezoteux (United States) Simon Mann | Ferrari F154CB 3.9 L Turbo V8 | M | 229 | +20 Laps |
| 33 | Hypercar | 4 | (Austria) Floyd Vanwall Racing Team | (Australia) Ryan Briscoe (Argentina) Esteban Guerrieri (France) Tristan Vautier | Vanwall Vandervell 680 | M | 217 | +32 Laps |
| 33 | Hypercar | 4 | (Austria) Floyd Vanwall Racing Team | (Australia) Ryan Briscoe (Argentina) Esteban Guerrieri (France) Tristan Vautier | Gibson GL458 4.5 L V8 | M | 217 | +32 Laps |
| NC | LMGTE Am | 25 | (Oman) ORT by TF | (Oman) Ahmad Al Harthy (United States) Michael Dinan (Republic of Ireland) Charlie Eastwood | Aston Martin Vantage AMR | M | 217 | Not classified |
| NC | LMGTE Am | 25 | (Oman) ORT by TF | (Oman) Ahmad Al Harthy (United States) Michael Dinan (Republic of Ireland) Charlie Eastwood | Aston Martin 4.0 L Turbo V8 | M | 217 | Not classified |
| NC | LMP2 | 10 | (United Kingdom) Vector Sport | (France) Gabriel Aubry (Republic of Ireland) Ryan Cullen (Liechtenstein) Matthias Kaiser | Oreca 07 | G | 216 | Not classified |
| NC | LMP2 | 10 | (United Kingdom) Vector Sport | (France) Gabriel Aubry (Republic of Ireland) Ryan Cullen (Liechtenstein) Matthias Kaiser | Gibson GK428 4.2 L V8 | G | 216 | Not classified |
| Ret | LMGTE Am | 60 | (Italy) Iron Lynx | (Italy) Matteo Cressoni (Belgium) Alessio Picariello (Italy) Claudio Schiavoni | Porsche 911 RSR-19 | M | 163 | Driver illness |
| Ret | LMGTE Am | 60 | (Italy) Iron Lynx | (Italy) Matteo Cressoni (Belgium) Alessio Picariello (Italy) Claudio Schiavoni | Porsche 4.2 L Flat-6 | M | 163 | Driver illness |
