= Gibson GL458 engine =

Zytek GL458
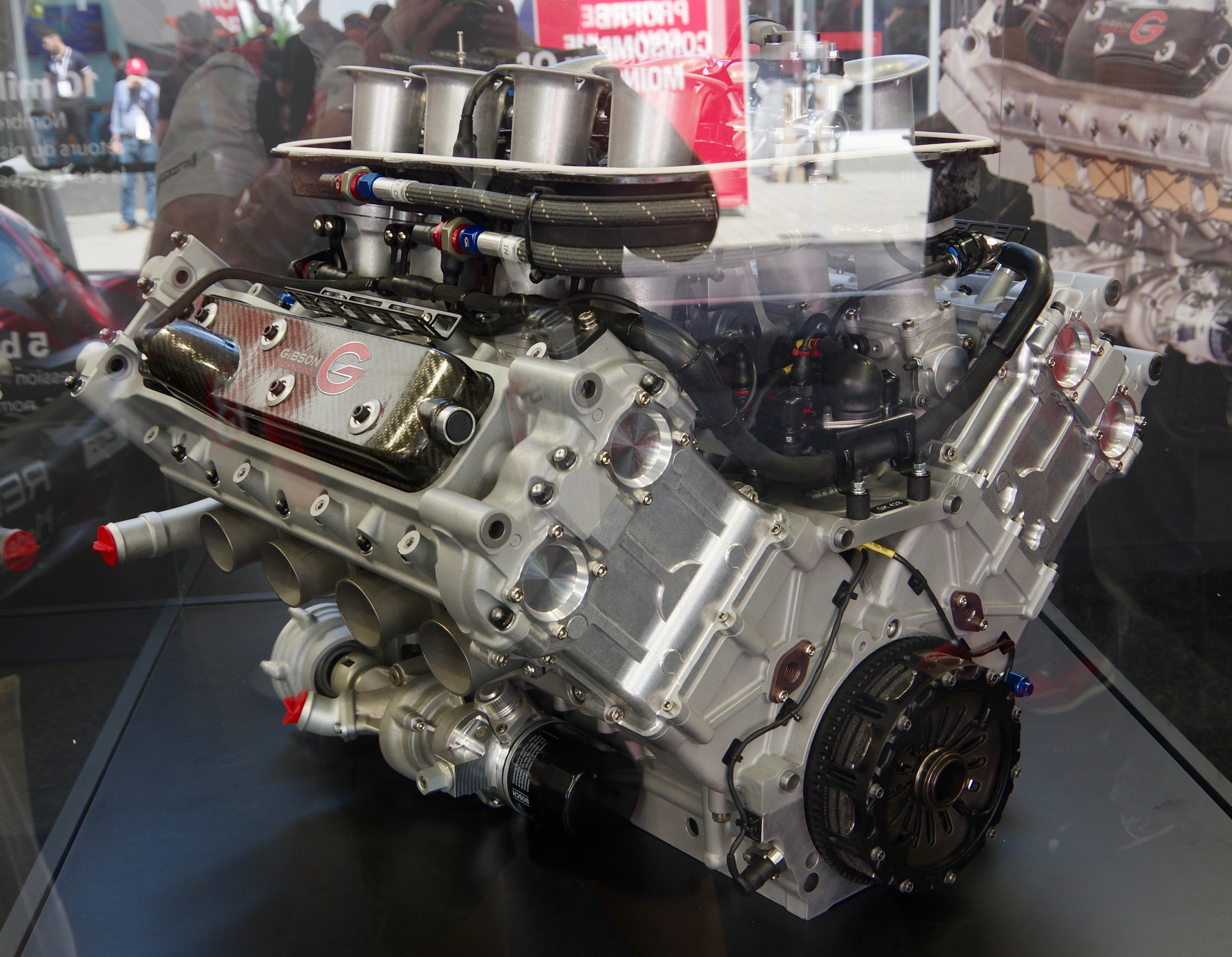

Overview
- Manufacturer: (United Kingdom) Gibson
- Production: 2018–present

Layout
- Configuration: Naturally-aspirated 90° V8
- Displacement: 4,496 cc (274 cu in)
- Cylinder bore: 98 mm (3.86 in)
- Piston stroke: 74.5 mm (2.93 in)
- Valvetrain: DOHC

Combustion
- Fuel system: Electronic indirect multi-point injection
- Fuel type: Elf LMS 102 RON unleaded Gasoline; E10 Ethanol

Output
- Power output: 600–800 hp (447–597 kW) @ 8,500-9,000 rpm
- Torque output: 410–573 lb⋅ft (556–777 N⋅m) @ 4,500-5,500 rpm

Dimensions
- Dry weight: 127 kg (280 lb)

Chronology
- Predecessor: Gibson GK428

The Gibson GL458 engine is a 4.5-litre, normally-aspirated, DOHC, V8 racing engine, developed and produced by Gibson for sports car racing, since 2018. It is designed for use in top-class prototype sportscars such as LMP1 and Hypercars, and is based on the Gibson GK428 engine used in LMP2 cars since 2017. It shares the majority of its parts with the GK428 such as the cylinder head, but around 30% of the parts are new, including the crankshaft, pistons, and conrods.

== Applications ==
- BR Engineering BR1
- Rebellion R13
- CLM P1/01
- Alpine A480
- Vanwall Vandervell 680
- 777 Hypercar
