= 2024 6 Hours of Spa-Francorchamps =

Sports car endurance race

(Belgium) 2024 TotalEnergies 6 Hours of Spa-Francorchamps
Event information
- Round 3 of 8 in the 2024 FIA World Endurance Championship
- Date: 11 May 2024
- Location: Stavelot
- Venue: Circuit de Spa-Francorchamps
- Duration: 6 hours

Results
- Laps completed: 141
- Distance (km): 987.564
- Distance (miles): 613.632
- Hypercar

Pole position
- Time: 2:03.107
- Team: (Germany) Porsche Penske Motorsport
- Drivers: (Australia) Matt Campbell

Winners
- Team: (United Kingdom) Hertz Team Jota
- Drivers: (United Kingdom) Callum Ilott (United Kingdom) Will Stevens
- LMGT3

Winners
- Team: (Germany) Manthey EMA
- Drivers: (Austria) Richard Lietz (Netherlands) Morris Schuring (Australia) Yasser Shahin

The 2024 6 Hours of Spa-Francorchamps (formally known as the 2024 TotalEnergies 6 Hours of Spa-Francorchamps) was an endurance sportscar racing event held on 11 May 2024, as the third of eight rounds of the 2024 FIA World Endurance Championship. It was the 58th running of the event, and the 13th running of the event as part of the World Endurance Championship.

== Background ==
The event was announced on 9 June 2023, during the 2023 24 Hours of Le Mans weekend. With the Italian round being moved from July to April, there is only a three-week period between the round at Imola, and the round at Spa.

== Entry list ==
The entry list was revealed on 24 April 2024, with 37 entries: 19 in the Hypercar category, and 18 in the LMGT3 category. Multiple Hypercar crews ran only two drivers for the event: the No. 2 Cadillac Racing entry ran with the same two drivers as in Imola, whilst the No. 12 Hertz Team Jota, No. 93 Peugeot TotalEnergies, and No. 94 Peugeot TotalEnergies entries ran without Norman Nato, Jean-Éric Vergne, and Stoffel Vandoorne, respectively. All three drivers had duties at the 2024 Berlin ePrix. Andrea Caldarelli replaced Edoardo Mortara in the No. 63 Lamborghini Iron Lynx entry, with Mortara also away on Formula E duties. Ferdinand Habsburg was initially set to make his return in the No. 35 Alpine Endurance Team entry, but was later replaced by Jules Gounon for an additional round since Habsburg was still recovering from his injury. In LMGT3, Ritomo Miyata replaced Kelvin van der Linde in the No. 78 Akkodis ASP Team entry. Furthermore, Rahel Frey replaced Doriane Pin in the No. 85 Iron Dames entry, with Pin having duties in the 2024 Formula Regional European Championship.

On a revised entry list, which was published on 6 May 2024, Harry Tincknell was dropped from the No. 99 Proton Competition crew, with Tincknell having duties in IMSA's Laguna Seca round. Julien Andlauer and Neel Jani shared the car as a duo. Furthermore, Akkodis ASP Team announced on 8 May 2024 that Clemens Schmid replaced Timur Boguslavskiy in their No. 78 entry, with the latter falling ill.

== Schedule ==
Date	Time (local: CEST)	Event
Thursday, 9 May	11:30	Free Practice 1
Thursday, 9 May	17:30	Free Practice 2
Friday, 10 May	11:00	Free Practice 3
Friday, 10 May	14:45	Qualifying - LMGT3
Friday, 10 May	15:08	Hyperpole - LMGT3
Friday, 10 May	15:30	Qualifying - Hypercar
Friday, 10 May	15:53	Hyperpole - Hypercar
Saturday, 11 May	13:00	Race

== Practice ==
Three practice sessions were held: two on Thursday and one on Friday. The sessions on Thursday morning and Thursday afternoon lasted 90 minutes, and the session on Friday morning lasted 60 minutes.

=== Practice 1 ===
The first practice session started at 11:30 CEST on Thursday and ended with Antonio Fuoco on top, with a lap time of 2:05.690 in the No. 50 Ferrari AF Corse entry. He was 1.141 seconds quicker than teammate Antonio Giovinazzi in the sister No. 51 Ferrari, whilst Daniil Kvyat rounded out the top three in the No. 63 Lamborghini Iron Lynx entry. LMGT3 was led by Daniel Juncadella in the No. 82 TF Sport Corvette, with a lap of 2:20.885. He was 0.335 seconds quicker than second-placed Davide Rigon in the No. 54 Vista AF Corse Ferrari, whilst Daniel Mancinelli rounded out the top three in the No. 27 Heart of Racing Team Aston Martin.

Class	No.	Entrant	Driver	Time
Hypercar	50	(Italy) Ferrari AF Corse	(Italy) Antonio Fuoco	2:05.690
LMGT3	82	(United Kingdom) TF Sport	(Spain) Daniel Juncadella	2:20.885

- Note: Only the fastest car in each class is shown.

=== Practice 2 ===
The second practice session started at 17:30 CEST on Thursday. Kévin Estre topped the time sheets in the No. 6 Porsche Penske Motorsport entry, with a lap of 2:04.162. He was 0.121 seconds quicker than Fuoco in the No. 50 Ferrari in second, with Alex Lynn 0.179 seconds behind Estre in the No. 2 Cadillac Racing entry. Clemens Schmid was quickest in LMGT3 in the No. 78 Akkodis ASP Team Lexus, with a lap of 2:21.257. He was 0.115 seconds quicker than second-placed Sarah Bovy in the No. 85 Iron Dames Lamborghini. Valentino Rossi rounded out the top three in the No. 46 Team WRT BMW.

Class	No.	Entrant	Driver	Time
Hypercar	6	(Germany) Porsche Penske Motorsport	(France) Kévin Estre	2:04.162
LMGT3	78	(France) Akkodis ASP Team	(Austria) Clemens Schmid	2:21.257

- Note: Only the fastest car in each class is shown.

=== Final practice ===
The third and final practice session started at 11:00 CEST on Friday. Estre was once again quickest in the No. 6 Porsche with a lap of 2:04.125, 0.215 seconds quicker than James Calado who set the second-fastest time in the No. 51 Ferrari. Mikkel Jensen was third-quickest in the No. 93 Peugeot TotalEnergies entry. The No. 92 Manthey PureRxcing Porsche of Alex Malykhin topped LMGT3 with a lap of 2:20.947, ahead of Rahel Frey in the No. 85 Lamborghini, 0.261 seconds slower. Juncadella rounded out the top three in the No. 82 Corvette.

Class	No.	Entrant	Driver	Time
Hypercar	6	(Germany) Porsche Penske Motorsport	(France) Kévin Estre	2:04.125
LMGT3	92	(Lithuania) Manthey PureRxcing	(Saint Kitts and Nevis) Alex Malykhin	2:20.947

- Note: Only the fastest car in each class is shown.

== Qualifying ==
Qualifying started at 14:45 CEST on Friday. Matt Campbell in the No. 5 Porsche claimed pole position with a lap of 2:03.107, whilst Lynn was second-quickest in the No. 2 Cadillac, only 0.008 seconds slower than Campbell. Julien Andlauer in the No. 99 Proton Competition Porsche qualified third. Fuoco originally claimed pole in the No. 50 Ferrari with a lap of 2:02.600, but was later disqualified as the car was found to be underweight. Sarah Bovy claimed pole in LMGT3 with a lap of 2:20.755 in the No. 85 Lamborghini, 0.383 seconds quicker than Ahmad Al Harthy in the No. 46 Team WRT BMW.

=== Qualifying results ===
Pole position winners in each class are marked in bold.

Pos	Class	No.	Entrant	Qualifying	Hyperpole	Grid
1	**Hypercar**	**5**	**(Germany) Porsche Penske Motorsport**	**2:02.675**	**2:03.107**	1
2	Hypercar	2	(United States) Cadillac Racing	2:02.981	2:03.115	2
3	Hypercar	99	(Germany) Proton Competition	2:02.947	2:03.314	3
4	Hypercar	12	(United Kingdom) Hertz Team Jota	2:02.941	2:03.384	4
5	Hypercar	6	(Germany) Porsche Penske Motorsport	2:02.947	2:03.448	5
6	Hypercar	8	(Japan) Toyota Gazoo Racing	2:02.586	2:03.572	6
7	Hypercar	35	(France) Alpine Endurance Team	2:02.898	2:03.685	7
8	Hypercar	83	(Italy) AF Corse	2:02.876	2:04.048	8
9	Hypercar	20	(Belgium) BMW M Team WRT	2:02.917	2:04.062	9
10	Hypercar	50	(Italy) Ferrari AF Corse	No time (Note: The No. 50 Ferrari AF Corse entry had all its lap times deleted after the car was found to be underweight and will start from the back of the Hypercar class. The car originally qualified on pole position.)	No time	19
11	Hypercar	51	(Italy) Ferrari AF Corse	2:03.002		10
12	Hypercar	36	(France) Alpine Endurance Team	2:03.186		11
13	Hypercar	15	(Belgium) BMW M Team WRT	2:03.408		12
14	Hypercar	93	(France) Peugeot TotalEnergies	2:03.616		13
15	Hypercar	7	(Japan) Toyota Gazoo Racing	2:03.738		14
16	Hypercar	94	(France) Peugeot TotalEnergies	2:03.898		15
17	Hypercar	63	(Italy) Lamborghini Iron Lynx	2:04.426		16
18	Hypercar	38	(United Kingdom) Hertz Team Jota	2:04.553		17
19	Hypercar	11	(Italy) Isotta Fraschini	2:05.953		18
20	**LMGT3**	**85**	**(Italy) Iron Dames**	**2:20.527**	**2:20.755**	20
21	LMGT3	46	(Belgium) Team WRT	2:21.233	2:21.138	21
22	LMGT3	91	(Germany) Manthey EMA	2:21.259	2:21.285	22
23	LMGT3	59	(United Kingdom) United Autosports	2:22.292	2:21.293	23
24	LMGT3	27	(United States) Heart of Racing Team	2:21.368	2:21.350	24
25	LMGT3	54	(Italy) Vista AF Corse	2:22.307	2:21.583	25
26	LMGT3	81	(United Kingdom) TF Sport	2:21.766	2:22.215	26
27	LMGT3	92	(Lithuania) Manthey PureRxcing	2:21.774	No time (Note: The No. 92 Manthey PureRxcing entry did not set a time in the LMGT3 Hyperpole session after driver Alex Malykhin suffered a big crash on his flying lap.)	27
28	LMGT3	78	(France) Akkodis ASP Team	2:21.377	No time (Note: The No. 78 Akkodis ASP Team entry did not set a time in the LMGT3 Hyperpole session after the engine of the car was unable to be fired up.)	28
29	LMGT3	95	(United Kingdom) United Autosports	No time (Note: The No. 95 United Autosports entry had all its lap times deleted after the car was found to be underweight and will start from the back of the LMGT3 class. The car originally qualified second in LMGT3.)	No time	37
30	LMGT3	88	(Germany) Proton Competition	2:22.485		29
31	LMGT3	77	(Germany) Proton Competition	2:22.558		30
32	LMGT3	31	(Belgium) Team WRT	2:23.042		31
33	LMGT3	55	(Italy) Vista AF Corse	2:23.091		32
34	LMGT3	777	(Japan) D'station Racing	2:23.094		33
35	LMGT3	82	(United Kingdom) TF Sport	2:23.527		34
36	LMGT3	87	(France) Akkodis ASP Team	2:25.021		35
37	LMGT3	60	(Italy) Iron Lynx	2:25.396		36

== Race ==
With 1 hour and 47 minutes left, the race was red flagged for barrier repairs following a major crash involving the No. 2 Cadillac Racing and the No. 31 Team WRT BMW. The stewards later extended the race duration by 1 hour and 44 minutes, leading to a post-race protest, as well as appeal, by Ferrari that were both rejected.

=== Race results ===
The minimum number of laps for classification (70% of overall winning car's distance) was 98 laps. Class winners are in bold and ‡.

Pos	Class	No	Team	Drivers	Chassis	Tyre	Laps	Time/Retired
Pos	Class	No	Team	Drivers	Engine	Tyre	Laps	Time/Retired
1	**Hypercar**	**12**	**(United Kingdom) Hertz Team Jota**	**(United Kingdom) Callum Ilott (United Kingdom) Will Stevens**	**Porsche 963**	M	**141**	**5:57:31.542‡**
1	**Hypercar**	**12**	**(United Kingdom) Hertz Team Jota**	**(United Kingdom) Callum Ilott (United Kingdom) Will Stevens**	**Porsche 9RD 4.6 L Turbo V8**	M	**141**	**5:57:31.542‡**
2	Hypercar	6	(Germany) Porsche Penske Motorsport	(France) Kévin Estre (Germany) André Lotterer (Belgium) Laurens Vanthoor	Porsche 963	M	141	+12.363
2	Hypercar	6	(Germany) Porsche Penske Motorsport	(France) Kévin Estre (Germany) André Lotterer (Belgium) Laurens Vanthoor	Porsche 9RD 4.6 L Turbo V8	M	141	+12.363
3	Hypercar	50	(Italy) Ferrari AF Corse	(Italy) Antonio Fuoco (Spain) Miguel Molina (Denmark) Nicklas Nielsen	Ferrari 499P	M	141	+1:14.020
3	Hypercar	50	(Italy) Ferrari AF Corse	(Italy) Antonio Fuoco (Spain) Miguel Molina (Denmark) Nicklas Nielsen	Ferrari F163 3.0 L Turbo V6	M	141	+1:14.020
4	Hypercar	51	(Italy) Ferrari AF Corse	(United Kingdom) James Calado (Italy) Antonio Giovinazzi (Italy) Alessandro Pier Guidi	Ferrari 499P	M	141	+1:17.710
4	Hypercar	51	(Italy) Ferrari AF Corse	(United Kingdom) James Calado (Italy) Antonio Giovinazzi (Italy) Alessandro Pier Guidi	Ferrari F163 3.0 L Turbo V6	M	141	+1:17.710
5	Hypercar	99	(Germany) Proton Competition	(France) Julien Andlauer (Switzerland) Neel Jani	Porsche 963	M	141	+1:26.326
5	Hypercar	99	(Germany) Proton Competition	(France) Julien Andlauer (Switzerland) Neel Jani	Porsche 9RD 4.6 L Turbo V8	M	141	+1:26.326
6	Hypercar	8	(Japan) Toyota Gazoo Racing	(Switzerland) Sébastien Buemi (New Zealand) Brendon Hartley (Japan) Ryo Hirakawa	Toyota GR010 Hybrid	M	141	+1:34.955
6	Hypercar	8	(Japan) Toyota Gazoo Racing	(Switzerland) Sébastien Buemi (New Zealand) Brendon Hartley (Japan) Ryo Hirakawa	Toyota H8909 3.5 L Turbo V6	M	141	+1:34.955
7	Hypercar	7	(Japan) Toyota Gazoo Racing	(United Kingdom) Mike Conway (Japan) Kamui Kobayashi (Netherlands) Nyck de Vries	Toyota GR010 Hybrid	M	141	+1:38.331 (Note: The No. 7 Toyota Gazoo Racing entry received a 5-second time penalty for causing a collision with the No. 85 Iron Dames entry. As a result, the car dropped from 6th to 7th overall.)
7	Hypercar	7	(Japan) Toyota Gazoo Racing	(United Kingdom) Mike Conway (Japan) Kamui Kobayashi (Netherlands) Nyck de Vries	Toyota H8909 3.5 L Turbo V6	M	141	+1:38.331
8	Hypercar	83	(Italy) AF Corse	(Poland) Robert Kubica (Israel) Robert Shwartzman (China) Yifei Ye	Ferrari 499P	M	141	+1:49.162
8	Hypercar	83	(Italy) AF Corse	(Poland) Robert Kubica (Israel) Robert Shwartzman (China) Yifei Ye	Ferrari F163 3.0 L Turbo V6	M	141	+1:49.162
9	Hypercar	35	(France) Alpine Endurance Team	(France) Paul-Loup Chatin (France) Jules Gounon (France) Charles Milesi	Alpine A424	M	141	+2:07.089
9	Hypercar	35	(France) Alpine Endurance Team	(France) Paul-Loup Chatin (France) Jules Gounon (France) Charles Milesi	Alpine V634 3.4 L Turbo V6	M	141	+2:07.089
10	Hypercar	93	(France) Peugeot TotalEnergies	(Denmark) Mikkel Jensen (Switzerland) Nico Müller	Peugeot 9X8 2024	M	140	+1 Lap
10	Hypercar	93	(France) Peugeot TotalEnergies	(Denmark) Mikkel Jensen (Switzerland) Nico Müller	Peugeot X6H 2.6 L Turbo V6	M	140	+1 Lap
11	Hypercar	15	(Belgium) BMW M Team WRT	(Switzerland) Raffaele Marciello (Belgium) Dries Vanthoor (Germany) Marco Wittmann	BMW M Hybrid V8	M	140	+1 Lap
11	Hypercar	15	(Belgium) BMW M Team WRT	(Switzerland) Raffaele Marciello (Belgium) Dries Vanthoor (Germany) Marco Wittmann	BMW P66/3 4.0 L Turbo V8	M	140	+1 Lap
12	Hypercar	36	(France) Alpine Endurance Team	(France) Nicolas Lapierre (Germany) Mick Schumacher (France) Matthieu Vaxivière	Alpine A424	M	140	+1 Lap
12	Hypercar	36	(France) Alpine Endurance Team	(France) Nicolas Lapierre (Germany) Mick Schumacher (France) Matthieu Vaxivière	Alpine V634 3.4 L Turbo V6	M	140	+1 Lap
13	Hypercar	20	(Belgium) BMW M Team WRT	(Netherlands) Robin Frijns (South Africa) Sheldon van der Linde (Germany) René Rast	BMW M Hybrid V8	M	140	+1 Lap
13	Hypercar	20	(Belgium) BMW M Team WRT	(Netherlands) Robin Frijns (South Africa) Sheldon van der Linde (Germany) René Rast	BMW P66/3 4.0 L Turbo V8	M	140	+1 Lap
14	Hypercar	94	(France) Peugeot TotalEnergies	(United Kingdom) Paul di Resta (France) Loïc Duval	Peugeot 9X8 2024	M	139	+2 Laps
14	Hypercar	94	(France) Peugeot TotalEnergies	(United Kingdom) Paul di Resta (France) Loïc Duval	Peugeot X6H 2.6 L Turbo V6	M	139	+2 Laps
15	Hypercar	11	(Italy) Isotta Fraschini	(United States) Carl Bennett (Canada) Antonio Serravalle (France) Jean-Karl Vernay	Isotta Fraschini Tipo 6-C	M	138	+3 Laps
15	Hypercar	11	(Italy) Isotta Fraschini	(United States) Carl Bennett (Canada) Antonio Serravalle (France) Jean-Karl Vernay	Isotta Fraschini 3.0 L Turbo V6	M	138	+3 Laps
16	**LMGT3**	**91**	**(Germany) Manthey EMA**	**(Austria) Richard Lietz (Netherlands) Morris Schuring (Australia) Yasser Shahin**	**Porsche 911 GT3 R (992)**	G	**130**	**+11 Laps‡**
16	**LMGT3**	**91**	**(Germany) Manthey EMA**	**(Austria) Richard Lietz (Netherlands) Morris Schuring (Australia) Yasser Shahin**	**Porsche M97/80 4.2 L Flat-6**	G	**130**	**+11 Laps‡**
17	LMGT3	92	(Lithuania) Manthey PureRxcing	(Austria) Klaus Bachler (Saint Kitts and Nevis) Alex Malykhin (Germany) Joel Sturm	Porsche 911 GT3 R (992)	G	130	+11 Laps
17	LMGT3	92	(Lithuania) Manthey PureRxcing	(Austria) Klaus Bachler (Saint Kitts and Nevis) Alex Malykhin (Germany) Joel Sturm	Porsche M97/80 4.2 L Flat-6	G	130	+11 Laps
18	LMGT3	60	(Italy) Iron Lynx	(Italy) Matteo Cressoni (France) Franck Perera (Italy) Claudio Schiavoni	Lamborghini Huracán GT3 Evo 2	G	130	+11 Laps
18	LMGT3	60	(Italy) Iron Lynx	(Italy) Matteo Cressoni (France) Franck Perera (Italy) Claudio Schiavoni	Lamborghini DGF 5.2 L V10	G	130	+11 Laps
19	LMGT3	59	(United Kingdom) United Autosports	(Brazil) Nicolas Costa (United Kingdom) James Cottingham (Switzerland) Grégoire Saucy	McLaren 720S GT3 Evo	G	130	+11 Laps
19	LMGT3	59	(United Kingdom) United Autosports	(Brazil) Nicolas Costa (United Kingdom) James Cottingham (Switzerland) Grégoire Saucy	McLaren M840T 4.0 L Turbo V8	G	130	+11 Laps
20	LMGT3	85	(Italy) Iron Dames	(Belgium) Sarah Bovy (Switzerland) Rahel Frey (Denmark) Michelle Gatting	Lamborghini Huracán GT3 Evo 2	G	130	+11 Laps (Note: The No. 85 Iron Dames entry received a 5-second time penalty for causing a collision with the No. 92 Manthey PureRxcing entry. As a result, the car dropped from 4th to 5th in class, and from 19th to 20th overall.)
20	LMGT3	85	(Italy) Iron Dames	(Belgium) Sarah Bovy (Switzerland) Rahel Frey (Denmark) Michelle Gatting	Lamborghini DGF 5.2 L V10	G	130	+11 Laps
21	LMGT3	54	(Italy) Vista AF Corse	(Italy) Francesco Castellacci (Switzerland) Thomas Flohr (Italy) Davide Rigon	Ferrari 296 GT3	G	130	+11 Laps
21	LMGT3	54	(Italy) Vista AF Corse	(Italy) Francesco Castellacci (Switzerland) Thomas Flohr (Italy) Davide Rigon	Ferrari F163CE 3.0 L Turbo V6	G	130	+11 Laps
22	LMGT3	777	(Japan) D'station Racing	(France) Erwan Bastard (France) Clément Mateu (Denmark) Marco Sørensen	Aston Martin Vantage AMR GT3 Evo	G	130	+11 Laps
22	LMGT3	777	(Japan) D'station Racing	(France) Erwan Bastard (France) Clément Mateu (Denmark) Marco Sørensen	Aston Martin M177 4.0 L Turbo V8	G	130	+11 Laps
23	LMGT3	88	(Germany) Proton Competition	(Norway) Dennis Olsen (Denmark) Mikkel O. Pedersen (Italy) Giorgio Roda	Ford Mustang GT3	G	130	+11 Laps (Note: The No. 88 Proton Competition entry received a 5-second time penalty after an unsafe release in the pit lane.)
23	LMGT3	88	(Germany) Proton Competition	(Norway) Dennis Olsen (Denmark) Mikkel O. Pedersen (Italy) Giorgio Roda	Ford Coyote 5.4 L V8	G	130	+11 Laps
24	LMGT3	77	(Germany) Proton Competition	(United Kingdom) Ben Barker (United States) Ryan Hardwick (Canada) Zacharie Robichon	Ford Mustang GT3	G	130	+11 Laps
24	LMGT3	77	(Germany) Proton Competition	(United Kingdom) Ben Barker (United States) Ryan Hardwick (Canada) Zacharie Robichon	Ford Coyote 5.4 L V8	G	130	+11 Laps
25	LMGT3	78	(France) Akkodis ASP Team	(Japan) Ritomo Miyata (France) Arnold Robin (Austria) Clemens Schmid	Lexus RC F GT3	G	129	+12 Laps
25	LMGT3	78	(France) Akkodis ASP Team	(Japan) Ritomo Miyata (France) Arnold Robin (Austria) Clemens Schmid	Lexus 2UR-GSE 5.4 L V8	G	129	+12 Laps
26	LMGT3	27	(United States) Heart of Racing Team	(United Kingdom) Ian James (Italy) Daniel Mancinelli (Spain) Alex Riberas	Aston Martin Vantage AMR GT3 Evo	G	129	+12 Laps
26	LMGT3	27	(United States) Heart of Racing Team	(United Kingdom) Ian James (Italy) Daniel Mancinelli (Spain) Alex Riberas	Aston Martin M177 4.0 L Turbo V8	G	129	+12 Laps
27	LMGT3	82	(United Kingdom) TF Sport	(France) Sébastien Baud (Spain) Daniel Juncadella (Japan) Hiroshi Koizumi	Chevrolet Corvette Z06 GT3.R	G	129	+12 Laps
27	LMGT3	82	(United Kingdom) TF Sport	(France) Sébastien Baud (Spain) Daniel Juncadella (Japan) Hiroshi Koizumi	Chevrolet LT6.R 5.5 L V8	G	129	+12 Laps
28	LMGT3	55	(Italy) Vista AF Corse	(France) François Heriau (United States) Simon Mann (Italy) Alessio Rovera	Ferrari 296 GT3	G	129	+12 Laps
28	LMGT3	55	(Italy) Vista AF Corse	(France) François Heriau (United States) Simon Mann (Italy) Alessio Rovera	Ferrari F163CE 3.0 L Turbo V6	G	129	+12 Laps
29	LMGT3	87	(France) Akkodis ASP Team	(Japan) Takeshi Kimura (Argentina) José María López (France) Esteban Masson	Lexus RC F GT3	G	128	+13 Laps
29	LMGT3	87	(France) Akkodis ASP Team	(Japan) Takeshi Kimura (Argentina) José María López (France) Esteban Masson	Lexus 2UR-GSE 5.4 L V8	G	128	+13 Laps
Ret	Hypercar	2	(United States) Cadillac Racing	(New Zealand) Earl Bamber (United Kingdom) Alex Lynn	Cadillac V-Series.R	M	95	Crash
Ret	Hypercar	2	(United States) Cadillac Racing	(New Zealand) Earl Bamber (United Kingdom) Alex Lynn	Cadillac LMC55R 5.5 L V8	M	95	Crash
Ret	LMGT3	31	(Belgium) Team WRT	(Brazil) Augusto Farfus (Indonesia) Sean Gelael (United Kingdom) Darren Leung	BMW M4 GT3	G	87	Crash
Ret	LMGT3	31	(Belgium) Team WRT	(Brazil) Augusto Farfus (Indonesia) Sean Gelael (United Kingdom) Darren Leung	BMW P58 3.0 L Turbo I6	G	87	Crash
Ret	Hypercar	5	(Germany) Porsche Penske Motorsport	(Australia) Matt Campbell (Denmark) Michael Christensen (France) Frédéric Makowiecki	Porsche 963	M	64	Did not finish
Ret	Hypercar	5	(Germany) Porsche Penske Motorsport	(Australia) Matt Campbell (Denmark) Michael Christensen (France) Frédéric Makowiecki	Porsche 9RD 4.6 L Turbo V8	M	64	Did not finish
Ret	Hypercar	63	(Italy) Lamborghini Iron Lynx	(Italy) Mirko Bortolotti (Italy) Andrea Caldarelli; Daniil Kvyat	Lamborghini SC63	M	59	Did not finish
Ret	Hypercar	63	(Italy) Lamborghini Iron Lynx	(Italy) Mirko Bortolotti (Italy) Andrea Caldarelli; Daniil Kvyat	Lamborghini 3.8 L Turbo V8	M	59	Did not finish
Ret	LMGT3	95	(United Kingdom) United Autosports	(United Kingdom) Josh Caygill (Chile) Nico Pino (Japan) Marino Sato	McLaren 720S GT3 Evo	G	59	Did not finish
Ret	LMGT3	95	(United Kingdom) United Autosports	(United Kingdom) Josh Caygill (Chile) Nico Pino (Japan) Marino Sato	McLaren M840T 4.0 L Turbo V8	G	59	Did not finish
Ret	LMGT3	81	(United Kingdom) TF Sport	(Angola) Rui Andrade (Republic of Ireland) Charlie Eastwood (Belgium) Tom van Rompuy	Chevrolet Corvette Z06 GT3.R	G	56	Did not finish
Ret	LMGT3	81	(United Kingdom) TF Sport	(Angola) Rui Andrade (Republic of Ireland) Charlie Eastwood (Belgium) Tom van Rompuy	Chevrolet LT6.R 5.5 L V8	G	56	Did not finish
Ret	Hypercar	38	(United Kingdom) Hertz Team Jota	(United Kingdom) Jenson Button (United Kingdom) Philip Hanson (Denmark) Oliver Rasmussen	Porsche 963	M	37	Did not finish
Ret	Hypercar	38	(United Kingdom) Hertz Team Jota	(United Kingdom) Jenson Button (United Kingdom) Philip Hanson (Denmark) Oliver Rasmussen	Porsche 9RD 4.6 L Turbo V8	M	37	Did not finish
Ret	LMGT3	46	(Belgium) Team WRT	(Oman) Ahmad Al Harthy (Belgium) Maxime Martin (Italy) Valentino Rossi	BMW M4 GT3	G	33	Did not finish
Ret	LMGT3	46	(Belgium) Team WRT	(Oman) Ahmad Al Harthy (Belgium) Maxime Martin (Italy) Valentino Rossi	BMW P58 3.0 L Turbo I6	G	33	Did not finish

== Standings after the race ==
2024 Hypercar World Endurance Drivers' Championship

Pos	+/-	Driver	Points
1		(France) Kévin Estre (Germany) André Lotterer (Belgium) Laurens Vanthoor	74
2	2	(United Kingdom) Callum Ilott (United Kingdom) Will Stevens	52
3	1	(United Kingdom) Mike Conway (Japan) Kamui Kobayashi (Netherlands) Nyck de Vries	46
4	1	(Australia) Matt Campbell (Denmark) Michael Christensen (France) Frédéric Makowiecki	40
5		(Italy) Antonio Fuoco (Spain) Miguel Molina (Denmark) Nicklas Nielsen	40

2024 Hypercar World Endurance Manufacturers' Championship

Pos	+/-	Manufacturer	Points
1		(Germany) Porsche	83
2		(Japan) Toyota	60
3		(Italy) Ferrari	49
4	1	(France) Alpine	23
5	1	(Germany) BMW	21

2024 FIA World Cup for Hypercar Teams

Pos	+/-	No	Team	Points
1		12	(United Kingdom) Hertz Team Jota	78
2		83	(Italy) AF Corse	67
3		99	(Germany) Proton Competition	41
4		38	(United Kingdom) Hertz Team Jota	18

2024 FIA Endurance Trophy for LMGT3 Drivers

Pos	+/-	Driver	Points
1		(Austria) Klaus Bachler (Saint Kitts and Nevis) Alex Malykhin (Germany) Joel Sturm	72
2		(Brazil) Augusto Farfus (Indonesia) Sean Gelael (United Kingdom) Darren Leung	37
3		(United Kingdom) Ian James (Italy) Daniel Mancinelli (Spain) Alex Riberas	37
4		(Oman) Ahmad Al Harthy (Belgium) Maxime Martin (Italy) Valentino Rossi	36
5		(France) Erwan Bastard (France) Clément Mateu (Denmark) Marco Sørensen	30

2024 FIA Endurance Trophy for LMGT3 Teams

Pos	+/-	No	Team	Points
1		92	(Lithuania) Manthey PureRxcing	72
2		31	(Belgium) Team WRT	37
3		27	(United States) Heart of Racing Team	37
4		46	(Belgium) Team WRT	36
5		777	(Japan) D'station Racing	30

== Official recordings ==
- Free Practice 3 | 2024 TotalEnergies 6 Hours of Spa on YouTube
- Full Qualifying and Hyperpole | 2024 TotalEnergies 6 Hours of Spa on YouTube
- Full Race | 2024 TotalEnergies 6 Hours of Spa on YouTube
