= 2024 FIA World Endurance Championship =

Auto racing series

- Organizer: Automobile Club de l'Ouest
- Discipline: Sports car endurance racing
- Races: 8

Champions
- Hypercar Manufacturer: (Japan) Toyota
- Hypercar Team: (United Kingdom) Hertz Team Jota
- LMGT3 Team: (Lithuania) Manthey PureRxcing

FIA World Endurance Championship
- ← 2023 2025 →

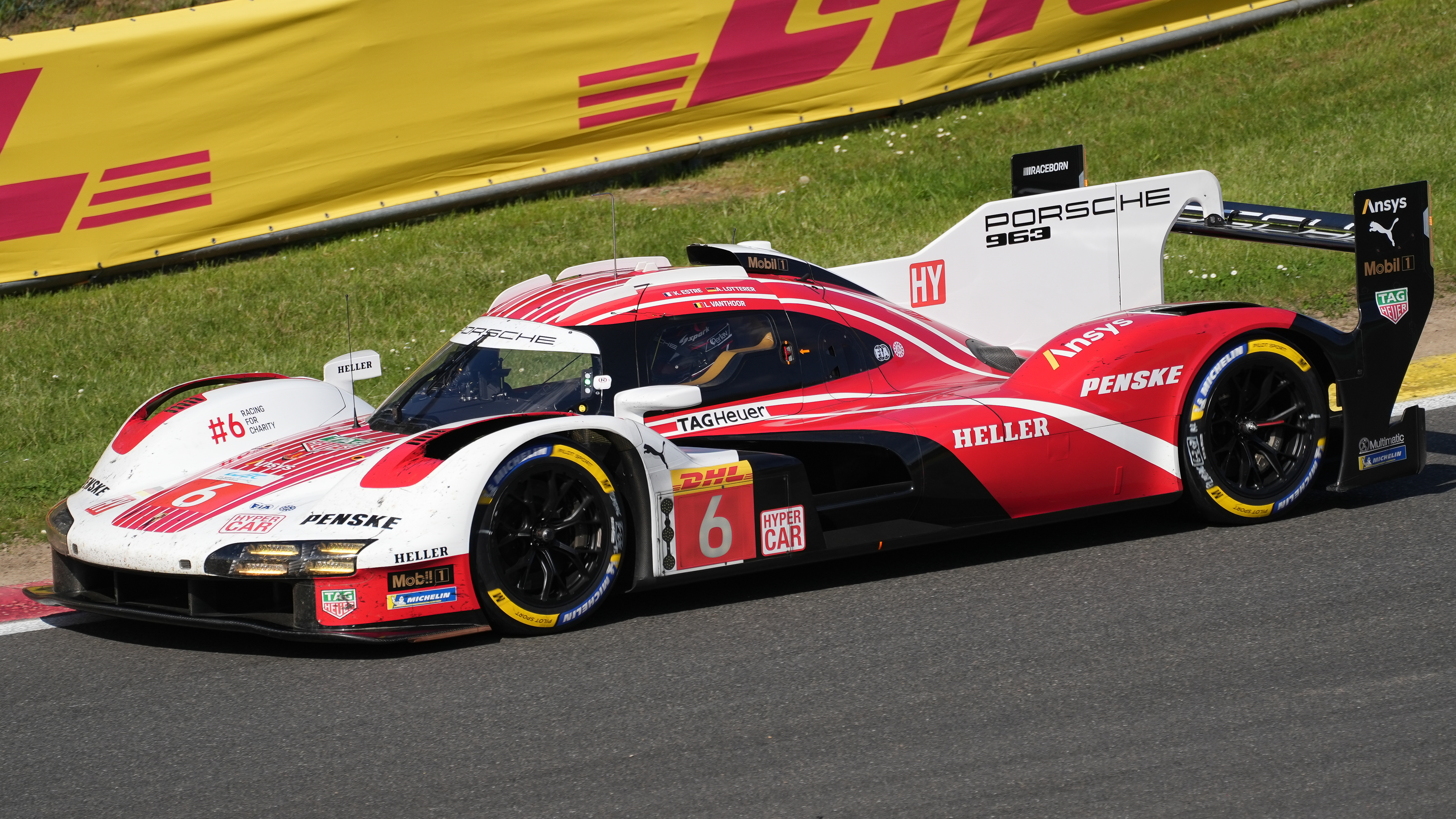
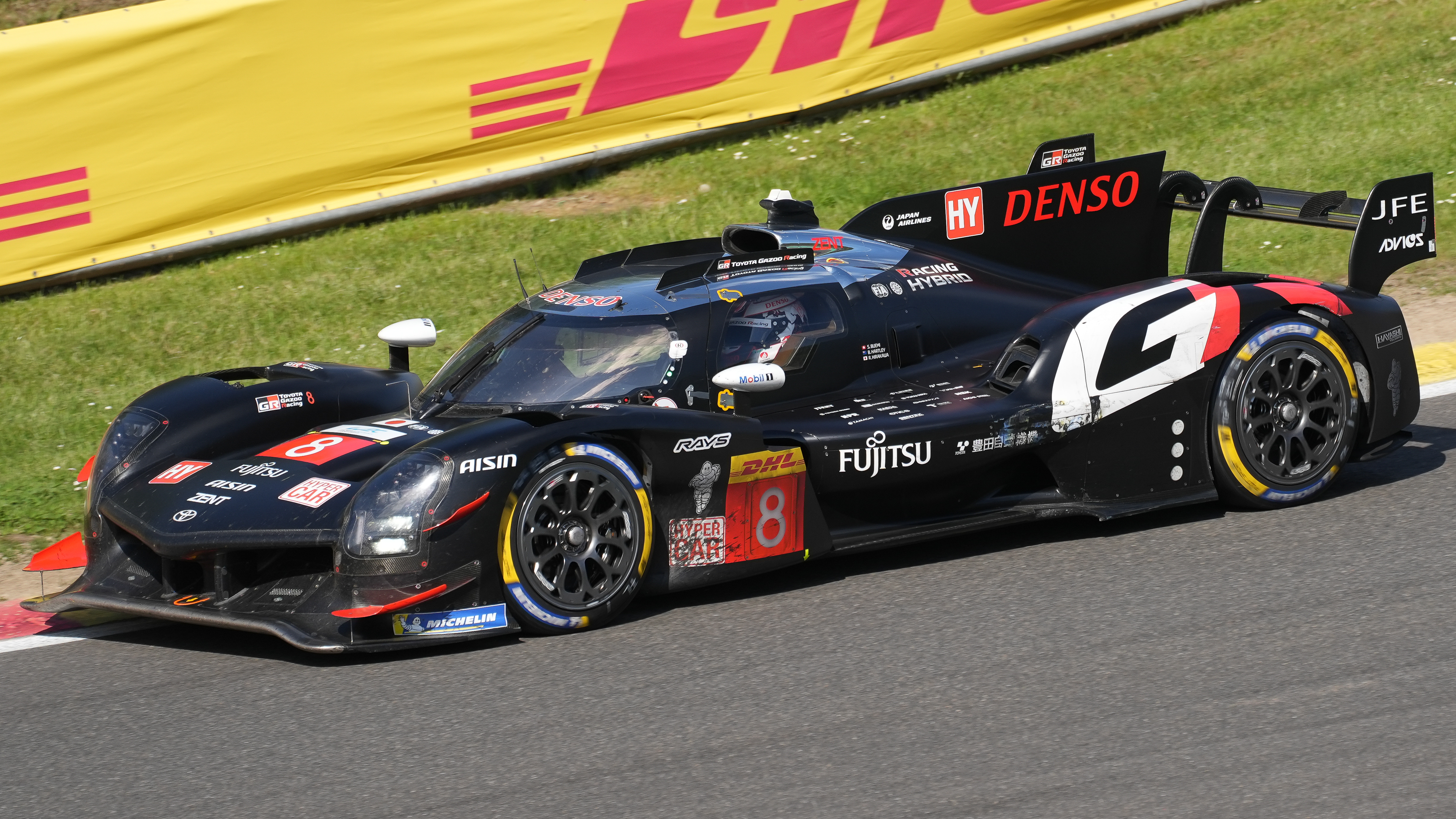
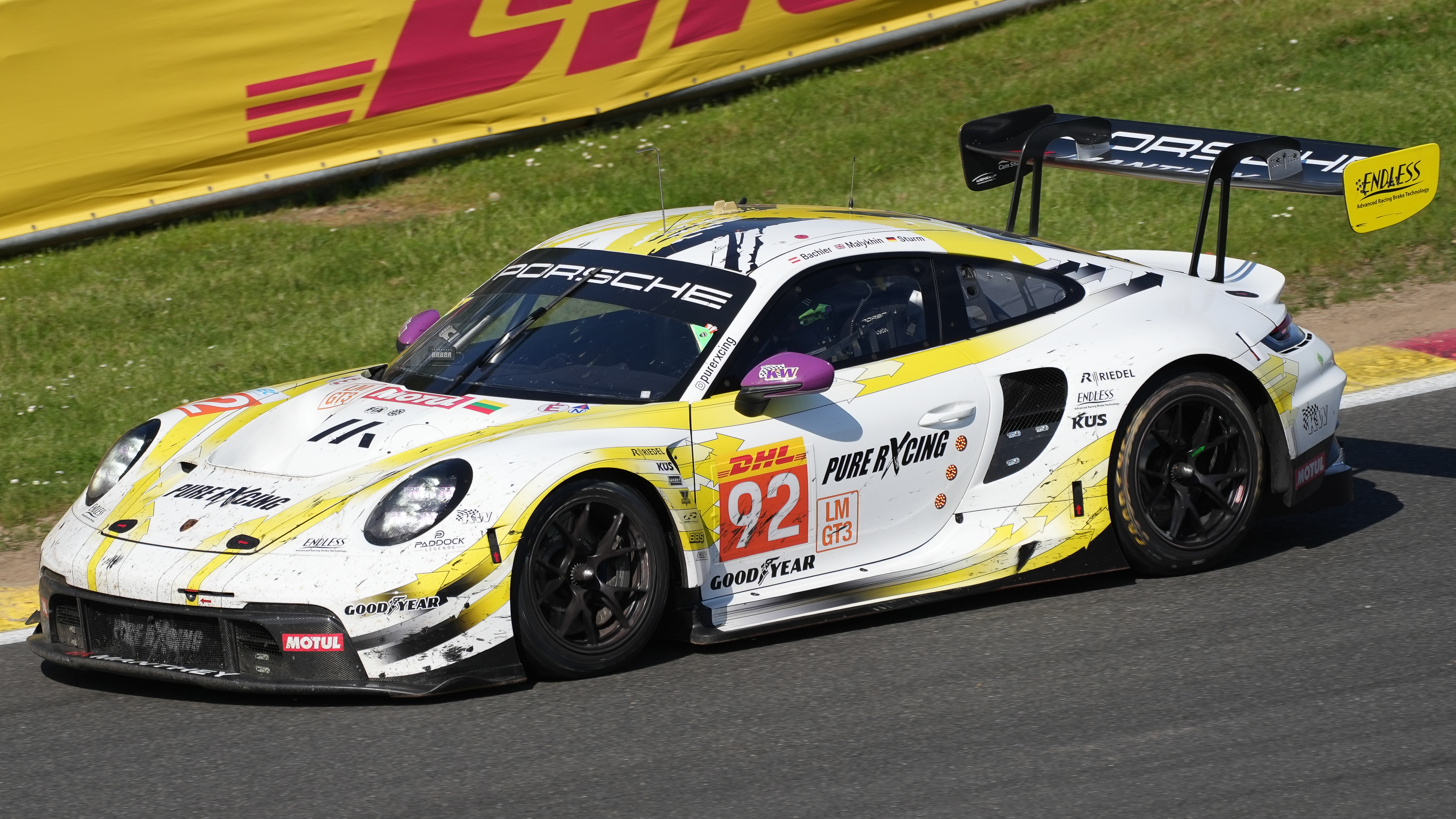
The Porsche No. 6 drivers of Team Penske are winners of the Hypercar World Endurance Drivers' Championship with Toyota taking the Manufacturers' Championship. The No. 92 Manthey PureRxcing Porsche are crowned as the LMGT3 Endurance Trophy champions.

The 2024 FIA World Endurance Championship was the twelfth season of the FIA World Endurance Championship, a sports car racing series organised by the Fédération Internationale de l'Automobile (FIA) and the Automobile Club de l'Ouest (ACO). The series was open to Hypercars (built under Le Mans Hypercar (LMH) or Le Mans Daytona h (LMDh) regulations) and, for the first time, LMGT3 racing cars.

This was the first season of the World Endurance Championship without the LMP2 class, after it was dropped due to the increasing demand in the Hypercar and LMGT3 classes. The LMP2 class will still take part at the 24 Hours of Le Mans. The LMGT3 class was introduced to replace the GTE class that was dropped at the end of the 2023 season. A maximum amount of 37 cars was set for the full-season grid.

Manufacturers entering in the LMGT3 category will only be allowed to enter a maximum of two cars, to allow for a greater diversity in the LMGT3 category. Priority is given to manufacturers who have also entered a car in the Hypercar category.

== Calendar ==
On 9 June 2023, during the 2023 Le Mans weekend, the calendar for the 2024 season was announced. It contains eight races, including two completely new races and two returning races. The 1000 Miles of Sebring, 6 Hours of Portimão, and 6 Hours of Monza races will not return in 2024, with Monza not being held due to the track being redeveloped. The Imola event would later replace Monza as the Italian round on the schedule, while the series will make its first visit to Qatar to start the season, allowing hotter weather than Sebring. The 6 Hours of São Paulo, which was last visited by the WEC in 2014 alongside the Lone Star Le Mans round that was previously hosted in 2020 would also make their return to the calendar.

The prologue was originally scheduled for 24 and 25 February but was delayed due to shipping issues.

Locations of the 2024 races

Rnd	Race	Circuit	Location	Date
	Prologue	Losail International Circuit	(Qatar) Lusail	26/27 February
1	Qatar 1812 km	Losail International Circuit	(Qatar) Lusail	2 March
2	6 Hours of Imola	Imola Circuit	(Italy) Imola	21 April
3	6 Hours of Spa-Francorchamps	Circuit de Spa-Francorchamps	(Belgium) Stavelot	11 May
4	24 Hours of Le Mans	Circuit de la Sarthe	(France) Le Mans	15–16 June
5	6 Hours of São Paulo	Interlagos Circuit	(Brazil) São Paulo	14 July
6	Lone Star Le Mans	Circuit of the Americas	(United States) Austin, Texas	1 September
7	6 Hours of Fuji	Fuji Speedway	(Japan) Oyama, Shizuoka	15 September
8	8 Hours of Bahrain	Bahrain International Circuit	(Bahrain) Sakhir	2 November

== Entries ==
The number of entries was capped at 37 cars due to garage limitations at Imola and the Circuit of the Americas. Frédéric Lequien, CEO of Le Mans Endurance Management, outlined a goal to increase the grid size in future seasons.

=== Hypercar ===
Racing in the FIA World Cup for Hypercar Teams

Entrant	Car	Engine	Hybrid	Tyre	No.	Drivers	Rounds
(United States) Cadillac Racing	Cadillac V-Series.R	Cadillac LMC55R 5.5 L V8	Hybrid	M	2	(New Zealand) Earl Bamber	All
(United States) Cadillac Racing	Cadillac V-Series.R	Cadillac LMC55R 5.5 L V8	Hybrid	M	2	(United Kingdom) Alex Lynn	All
(United States) Cadillac Racing	Cadillac V-Series.R	Cadillac LMC55R 5.5 L V8	Hybrid	M	2	(France) Sébastien Bourdais	1, 8
(United States) Cadillac Racing	Cadillac V-Series.R	Cadillac LMC55R 5.5 L V8	Hybrid	M	2	(Spain) Álex Palou	4
(Germany) Porsche Penske Motorsport	Porsche 963	Porsche 9RD 4.6 L Turbo V8	Hybrid	M	5	(Australia) Matt Campbell	All
(Germany) Porsche Penske Motorsport	Porsche 963	Porsche 9RD 4.6 L Turbo V8	Hybrid	M	5	(Denmark) Michael Christensen	All
(Germany) Porsche Penske Motorsport	Porsche 963	Porsche 9RD 4.6 L Turbo V8	Hybrid	M	5	(France) Frédéric Makowiecki	All
(Germany) Porsche Penske Motorsport	Porsche 963	Porsche 9RD 4.6 L Turbo V8	Hybrid	M	6	(France) Kévin Estre	All
(Germany) Porsche Penske Motorsport	Porsche 963	Porsche 9RD 4.6 L Turbo V8	Hybrid	M	6	(Germany) André Lotterer	All
(Germany) Porsche Penske Motorsport	Porsche 963	Porsche 9RD 4.6 L Turbo V8	Hybrid	M	6	(Belgium) Laurens Vanthoor	All
(Japan) Toyota Gazoo Racing	Toyota GR010 Hybrid	Toyota H8909 3.5 L Turbo V6	Hybrid	M	7	(Japan) Kamui Kobayashi	All
(Japan) Toyota Gazoo Racing	Toyota GR010 Hybrid	Toyota H8909 3.5 L Turbo V6	Hybrid	M	7	(Netherlands) Nyck de Vries	All
(Japan) Toyota Gazoo Racing	Toyota GR010 Hybrid	Toyota H8909 3.5 L Turbo V6	Hybrid	M	7	(United Kingdom) Mike Conway	1–3, 5–8
(Japan) Toyota Gazoo Racing	Toyota GR010 Hybrid	Toyota H8909 3.5 L Turbo V6	Hybrid	M	7	(Argentina) José María López	4
(Japan) Toyota Gazoo Racing	Toyota GR010 Hybrid	Toyota H8909 3.5 L Turbo V6	Hybrid	M	8	(Switzerland) Sébastien Buemi	All
(Japan) Toyota Gazoo Racing	Toyota GR010 Hybrid	Toyota H8909 3.5 L Turbo V6	Hybrid	M	8	(New Zealand) Brendon Hartley	All
(Japan) Toyota Gazoo Racing	Toyota GR010 Hybrid	Toyota H8909 3.5 L Turbo V6	Hybrid	M	8	(Japan) Ryō Hirakawa	All
(Italy) Isotta Fraschini	Isotta Fraschini Tipo 6-C	Isotta Fraschini 3.0 L Turbo V6	Hybrid	M	11	(Thailand) Carl Bennett	1–5
(Italy) Isotta Fraschini	Isotta Fraschini Tipo 6-C	Isotta Fraschini 3.0 L Turbo V6	Hybrid	M	11	(Canada) Antonio Serravalle	1–5
(Italy) Isotta Fraschini	Isotta Fraschini Tipo 6-C	Isotta Fraschini 3.0 L Turbo V6	Hybrid	M	11	(France) Jean-Karl Vernay	1–5
(United Kingdom) Hertz Team Jota	Porsche 963	Porsche 9RD 4.6 L Turbo V8	Hybrid	M	12	(United Kingdom) Callum Ilott	All
(United Kingdom) Hertz Team Jota	Porsche 963	Porsche 9RD 4.6 L Turbo V8	Hybrid	M	12	(United Kingdom) Will Stevens	All
(United Kingdom) Hertz Team Jota	Porsche 963	Porsche 9RD 4.6 L Turbo V8	Hybrid	M	12	(France) Norman Nato	1–2, 4–8
(United Kingdom) Hertz Team Jota	Porsche 963	Porsche 9RD 4.6 L Turbo V8	Hybrid	M	38	(United Kingdom) Jenson Button	All
(United Kingdom) Hertz Team Jota	Porsche 963	Porsche 9RD 4.6 L Turbo V8	Hybrid	M	38	(United Kingdom) Phil Hanson	All
(United Kingdom) Hertz Team Jota	Porsche 963	Porsche 9RD 4.6 L Turbo V8	Hybrid	M	38	(Denmark) Oliver Rasmussen	All
(Belgium) BMW M Team WRT	BMW M Hybrid V8	BMW P66/3 4.0 L Turbo V8	Hybrid	M	15	(Switzerland) Raffaele Marciello	All
(Belgium) BMW M Team WRT	BMW M Hybrid V8	BMW P66/3 4.0 L Turbo V8	Hybrid	M	15	(Belgium) Dries Vanthoor	All
(Belgium) BMW M Team WRT	BMW M Hybrid V8	BMW P66/3 4.0 L Turbo V8	Hybrid	M	15	(Germany) Marco Wittmann	All
(Belgium) BMW M Team WRT	BMW M Hybrid V8	BMW P66/3 4.0 L Turbo V8	Hybrid	M	20	(Netherlands) Robin Frijns	All
(Belgium) BMW M Team WRT	BMW M Hybrid V8	BMW P66/3 4.0 L Turbo V8	Hybrid	M	20	(Germany) René Rast	All
(Belgium) BMW M Team WRT	BMW M Hybrid V8	BMW P66/3 4.0 L Turbo V8	Hybrid	M	20	(South Africa) Sheldon van der Linde	All
(France) Alpine Endurance Team	Alpine A424	Alpine V634 3.4 L Turbo V6	Hybrid	M	35	(France) Paul-Loup Chatin	1–6, 8
(France) Alpine Endurance Team	Alpine A424	Alpine V634 3.4 L Turbo V6	Hybrid	M	35	(Austria) Ferdinand Habsburg	1, 4–8
(France) Alpine Endurance Team	Alpine A424	Alpine V634 3.4 L Turbo V6	Hybrid	M	35	(France) Jules Gounon	2–3, 7–8
(France) Alpine Endurance Team	Alpine A424	Alpine V634 3.4 L Turbo V6	Hybrid	M	35	(France) Charles Milesi	1–7
(France) Alpine Endurance Team	Alpine A424	Alpine V634 3.4 L Turbo V6	Hybrid	M	36	(France) Charles Milesi	8
(France) Alpine Endurance Team	Alpine A424	Alpine V634 3.4 L Turbo V6	Hybrid	M	36	(Germany) Mick Schumacher	All
(France) Alpine Endurance Team	Alpine A424	Alpine V634 3.4 L Turbo V6	Hybrid	M	36	(France) Matthieu Vaxivière	All
(France) Alpine Endurance Team	Alpine A424	Alpine V634 3.4 L Turbo V6	Hybrid	M	36	(France) Nicolas Lapierre	1–7
(Italy) Ferrari AF Corse	Ferrari 499P	Ferrari F163CG 3.0 L Turbo V6	Hybrid	M	50	(Italy) Antonio Fuoco	All
(Italy) Ferrari AF Corse	Ferrari 499P	Ferrari F163CG 3.0 L Turbo V6	Hybrid	M	50	(Spain) Miguel Molina	All
(Italy) Ferrari AF Corse	Ferrari 499P	Ferrari F163CG 3.0 L Turbo V6	Hybrid	M	50	(Denmark) Nicklas Nielsen	All
(Italy) Ferrari AF Corse	Ferrari 499P	Ferrari F163CG 3.0 L Turbo V6	Hybrid	M	51	(United Kingdom) James Calado	All
(Italy) Ferrari AF Corse	Ferrari 499P	Ferrari F163CG 3.0 L Turbo V6	Hybrid	M	51	(Italy) Antonio Giovinazzi	All
(Italy) Ferrari AF Corse	Ferrari 499P	Ferrari F163CG 3.0 L Turbo V6	Hybrid	M	51	(Italy) Alessandro Pier Guidi	All
(Italy) AF Corse	Ferrari 499P	Ferrari F163CG 3.0 L Turbo V6	Hybrid	M	83	(Poland) Robert Kubica	All
(Italy) AF Corse	Ferrari 499P	Ferrari F163CG 3.0 L Turbo V6	Hybrid	M	83	(Israel) Robert Shwartzman	All
(Italy) AF Corse	Ferrari 499P	Ferrari F163CG 3.0 L Turbo V6	Hybrid	M	83	(China) Yifei Ye	All
(Italy) Lamborghini Iron Lynx	Lamborghini SC63	Lamborghini 3.8 L Turbo V8	Hybrid	M	63	(Italy) Mirko Bortolotti	All
(Italy) Lamborghini Iron Lynx	Lamborghini SC63	Lamborghini 3.8 L Turbo V8	Hybrid	M	63	Daniil Kvyat (Note: Kvyat and Boguslavskiy are Russian, but they competed as neutral competitors as Russian national emblems were banned by the FIA following the Russian invasion of Ukraine.)	All
(Italy) Lamborghini Iron Lynx	Lamborghini SC63	Lamborghini 3.8 L Turbo V8	Hybrid	M	63	(Italy) Edoardo Mortara	1–2, 4–8
(Italy) Lamborghini Iron Lynx	Lamborghini SC63	Lamborghini 3.8 L Turbo V8	Hybrid	M	63	(Italy) Andrea Caldarelli	3
(France) Peugeot TotalEnergies	Peugeot 9X8	Peugeot X6H 2.6 L Turbo V6	Hybrid	M	93	(Denmark) Mikkel Jensen	All
(France) Peugeot TotalEnergies	Peugeot 9X8	Peugeot X6H 2.6 L Turbo V6	Hybrid	M	93	(Switzerland) Nico Müller	All
(France) Peugeot TotalEnergies	Peugeot 9X8	Peugeot X6H 2.6 L Turbo V6	Hybrid	M	93	(France) Jean-Éric Vergne	1–2, 4–8
(France) Peugeot TotalEnergies	Peugeot 9X8	Peugeot X6H 2.6 L Turbo V6	Hybrid	M	94	(United Kingdom) Paul di Resta	All
(France) Peugeot TotalEnergies	Peugeot 9X8	Peugeot X6H 2.6 L Turbo V6	Hybrid	M	94	(France) Loïc Duval	All
(France) Peugeot TotalEnergies	Peugeot 9X8	Peugeot X6H 2.6 L Turbo V6	Hybrid	M	94	(Belgium) Stoffel Vandoorne	1–2, 4–8
(Germany) Proton Competition	Porsche 963	Porsche 9RD 4.6 L Turbo V8	Hybrid	M	99	(France) Julien Andlauer	All
(Germany) Proton Competition	Porsche 963	Porsche 9RD 4.6 L Turbo V8	Hybrid	M	99	(Switzerland) Neel Jani	All
(Germany) Proton Competition	Porsche 963	Porsche 9RD 4.6 L Turbo V8	Hybrid	M	99	(United Kingdom) Harry Tincknell	1–2, 4, 6–8

Hypercar team changes
- Following the 2023 season Glickenhaus Racing chose to withdraw due to financial reasons and Floyd Vanwall Racing had their application refused.
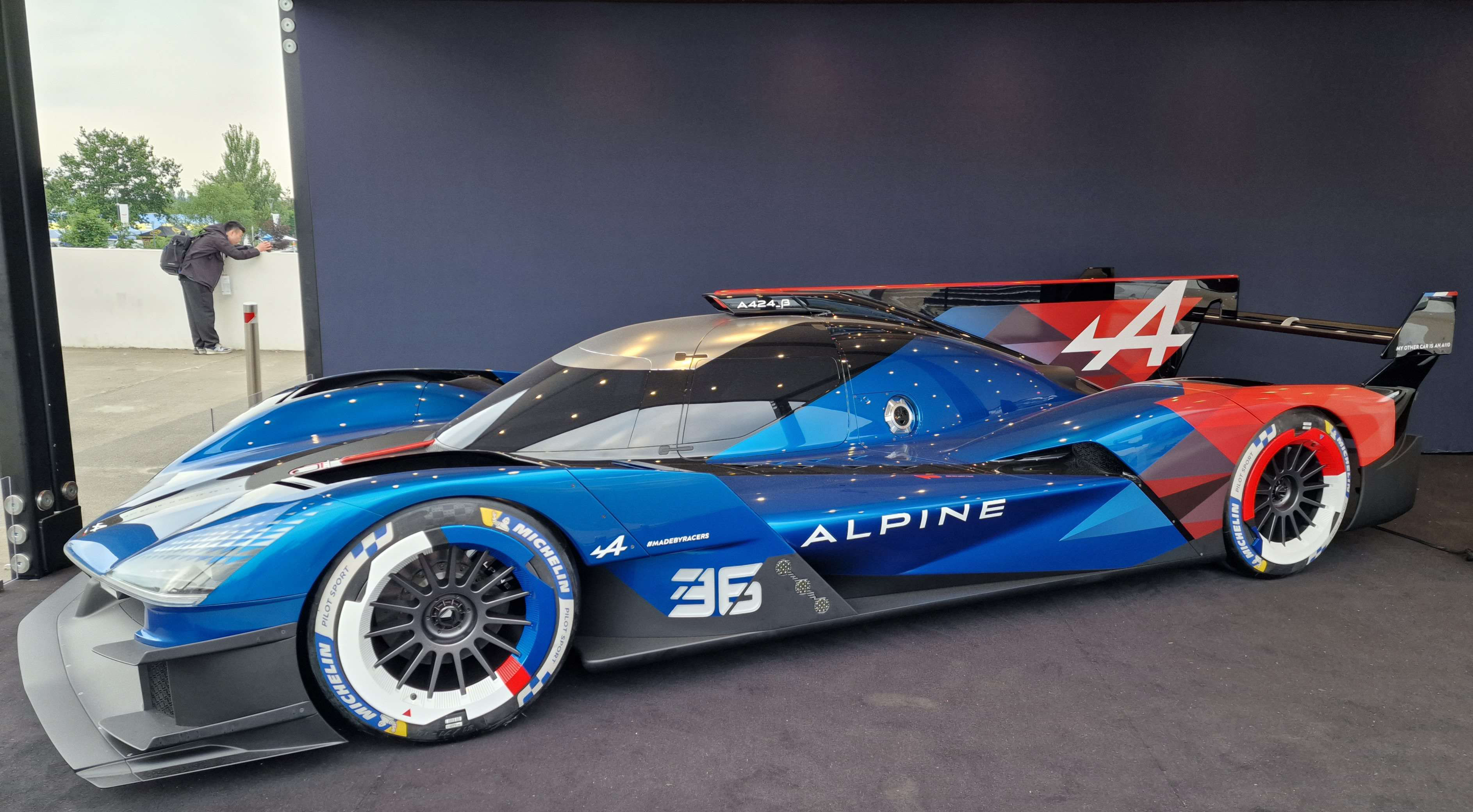
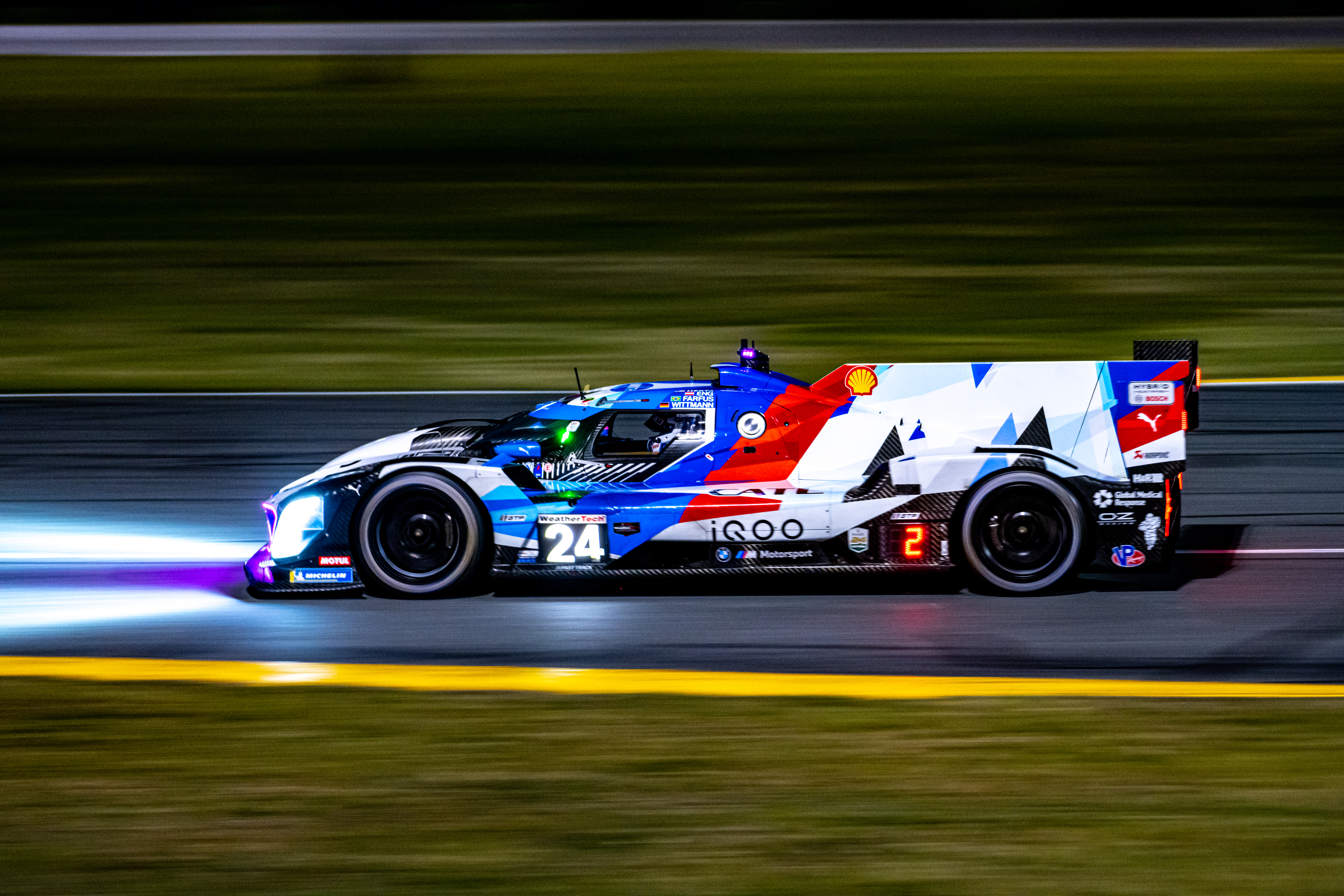
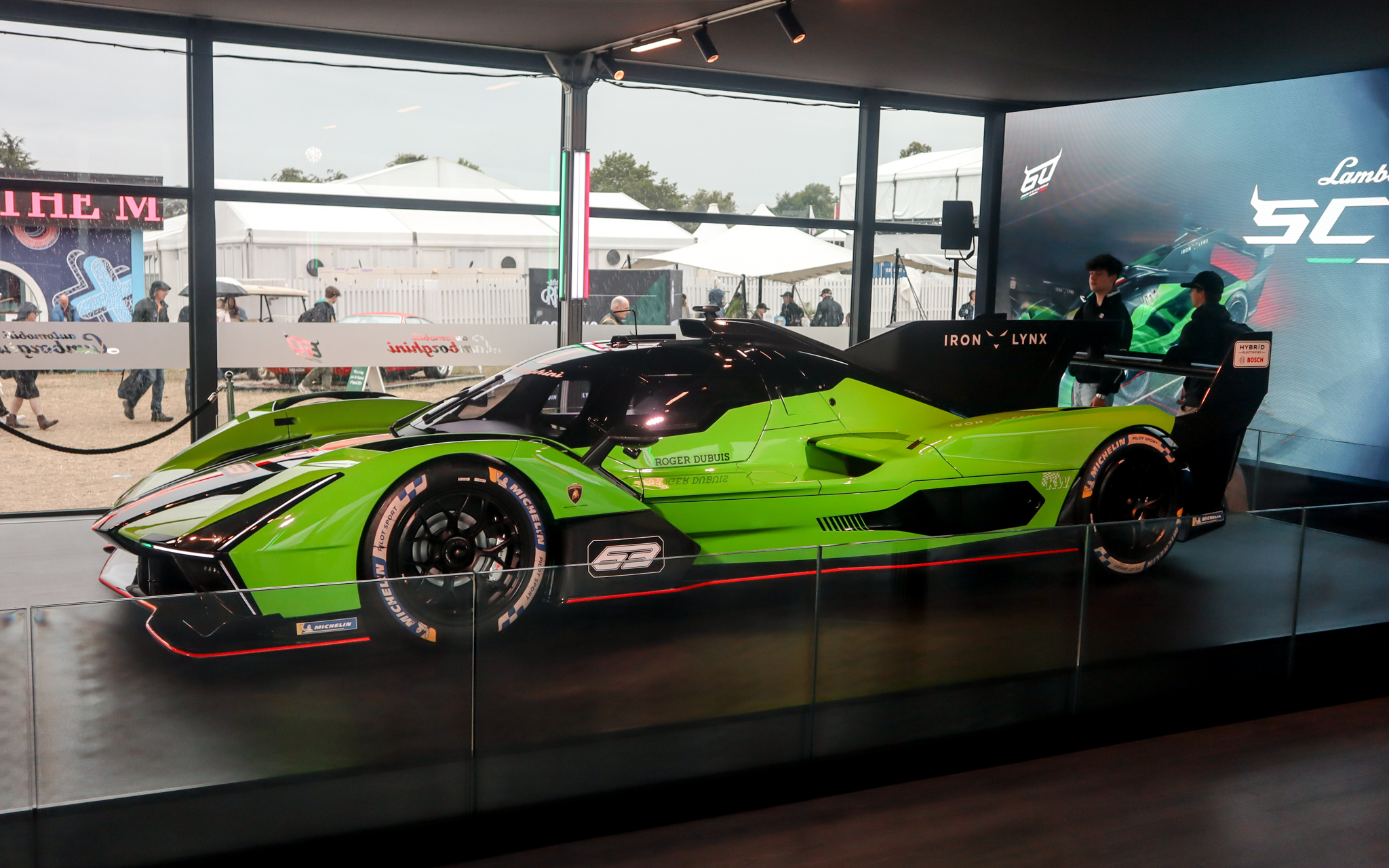
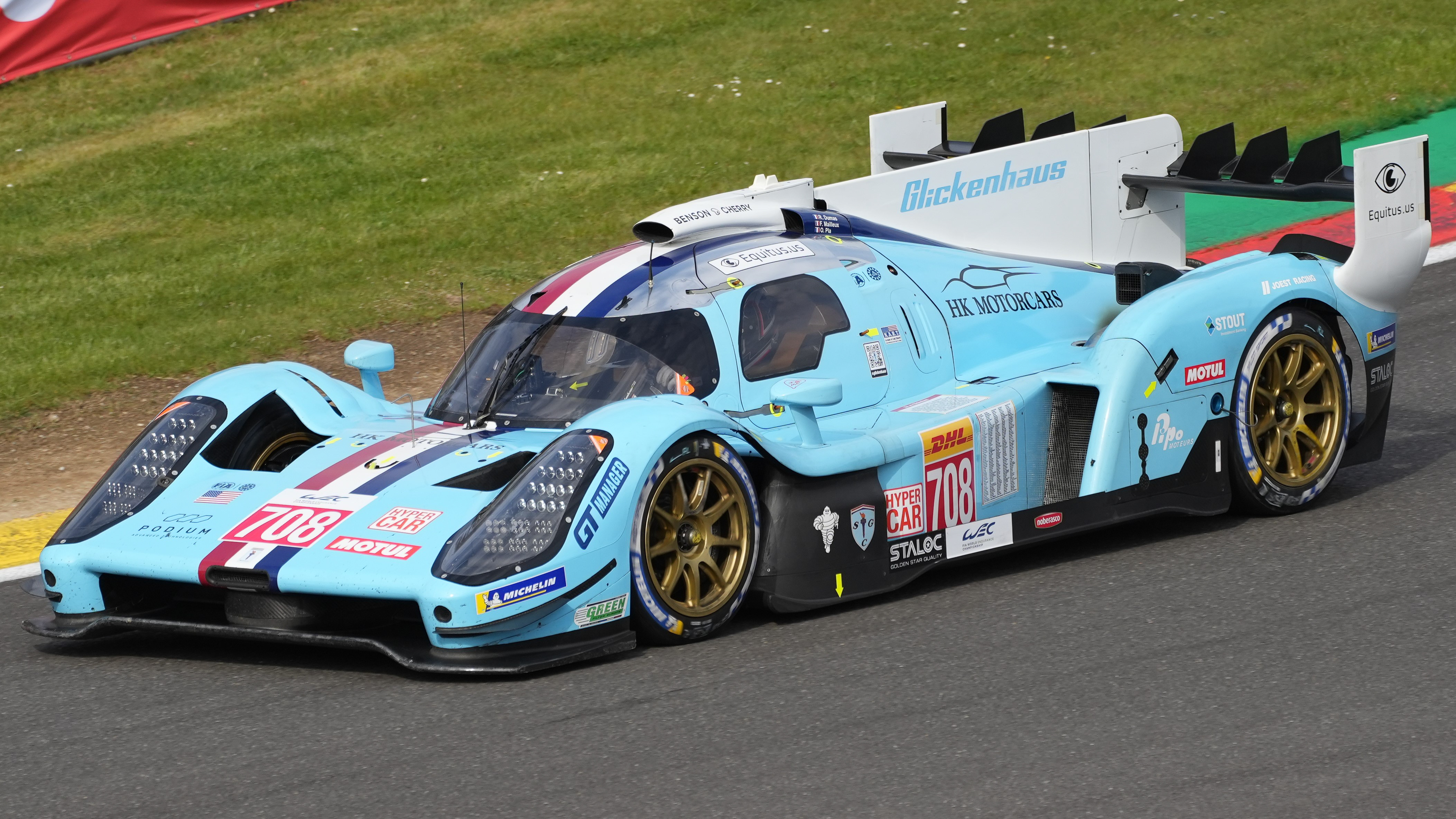
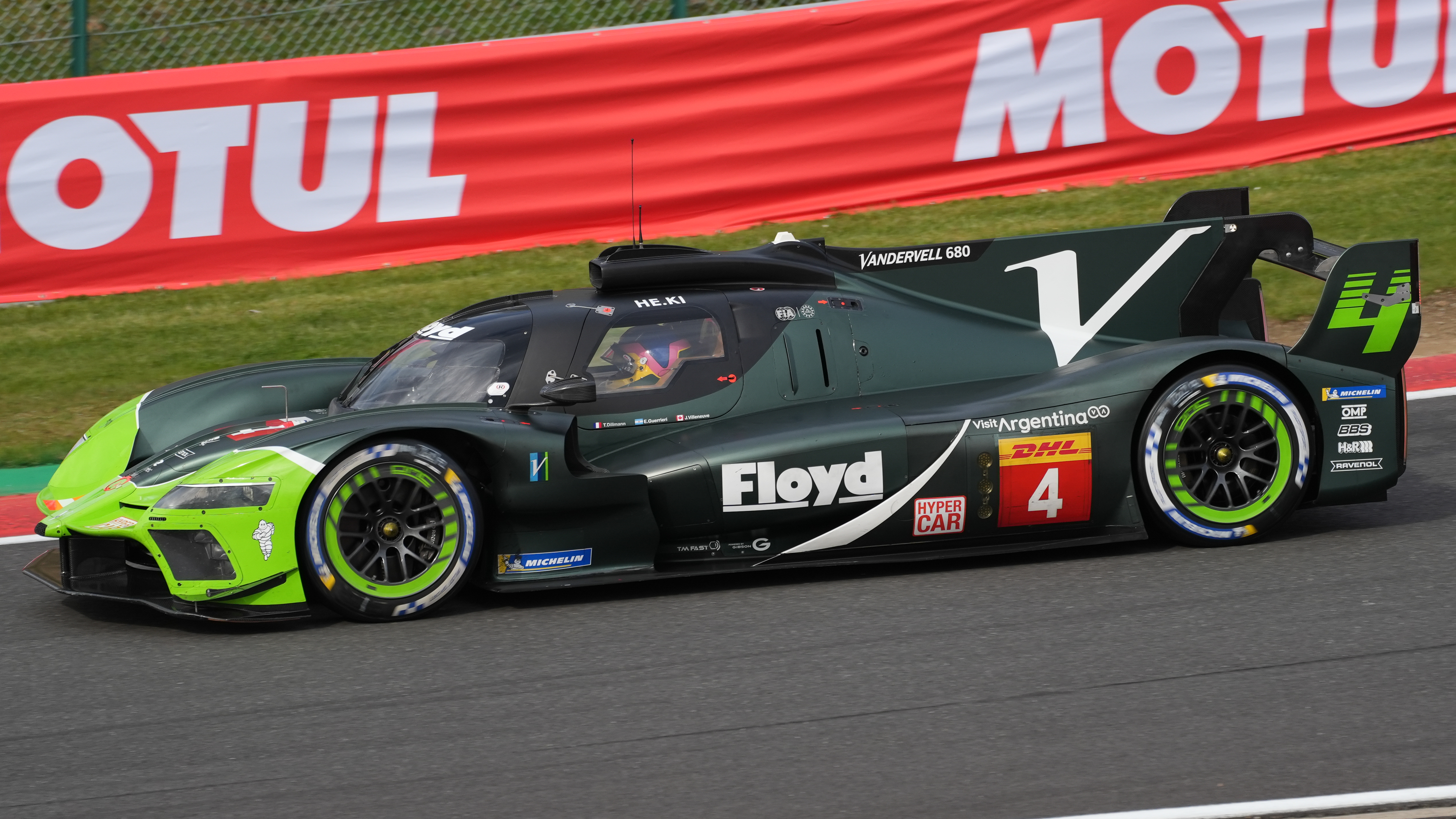
  Alpine, BMW and Lamborghini (top) joined the Hypercar grid, as Glickenhaus and Vanwall (bottom) pulled out.
- Revived luxury Italian manufacturer Isotta Fraschini joined with a single Michelotto-produced LMH. It partnered with Duqueine after a previous deal with Vector Sport fell through.
- Hertz Team Jota entered an additional Porsche 963 following LMP2's removal from the series.
- Reigning LMP2 champions Team WRT joined Hypercar fielding two works BMW M Hybrid V8s, having previously been slated to run Audi's cancelled LMDh programme. BMW's only previous entry into the FIA World Endurance Championship was in the GTE Pro category in 2018–19, while the Dallara-based M Hybrid V8, which debuted in the 2023 IMSA SportsCar Championship, marked BMW's return to top-class sportscar racing for the first time since winning the 1999 24 Hours of Le Mans.
- Alpine returned to the top class with two new Oreca-based A424 cars operated by Signatech, following a transition season in LMP2 in 2023.
- As well as running the two factory Ferraris, AF Corse entered a privateer 499P as an additional third car.
- Lamborghini Squadra Corse developed its first racing prototype since the Group C era, a Ligier-based LMDh run by the Prema/Iron Lynx conglomerate.
  Mid-season changes
- Peugeot TotalEnergies abandoned its wingless design concept and launched a new version of its 9X8 Hypercar for round 2 at Imola.
- On 21 August 2024, a week prior to Lone Star Le Mans, Isotta Fraschini parted ways with Duqueine and announced its immediate withdrawal from WEC.
Hypercar driver changes
- Richard Westbrook departed Cadillac after a single season to join JDC-Miller in the IMSA SportsCar Championship's GTP class. Earl Bamber and Alex Lynn were retained as a pair, with US-based Ganassi drivers joining them on occasion: Sébastien Bourdais in Qatar and two-time Indycar Series champion Álex Palou at Le Mans. Renger van der Zande was expected to reinforce the crew at the season-ending Bahrain round, but Bourdais got the drive instead.
- Porsche Penske moved Dane Cameron to its full-time IMSA GTP lineup, effectively swapping seats with Matt Campbell, a former GTE Am runner-up for Dempsey-Proton.
- After six seasons and two overall titles, Toyota demoted José María López to Akkodis ASP's Lexus LMGT3 entry. Former Toyota test driver and LMP2 race winner Nyck de Vries replaced him in the #7 car after his dismissal from Formula One.
- TCR driver Jean-Karl Vernay was joined by young single-seater graduates Antonio Serravalle and Carl Bennett at Isotta Fraschini, with Bennett a late change after ELMS LMP3 champion Alex García's withdrawal.
- For its Hypercar debut, BMW M Team WRT called upon the services of long-serving works drivers Sheldon van der Linde and Marco Wittmann, as well as new signings Robin Frijns, René Rast, Dries Vanthoor and Raffaele Marciello. Multi-time GT World Challenge Europe champions Marciello and Vanthoor joined from Mercedes-AMG and Audi respectively to partner DTM legend Wittmann in the #15 car, whereas ex-Audi stalwarts Frijns and Rast reunited in the #20 alongside Van Der Linde.
- From Alpine's 2023 LMP2 line-up, only Charles Milesi and Matthieu Vaxivière stepped up to Hypercar with the team, as Nicolas Lapierre returned after a year in the sidelines. Three newcomers completed the roster: three-time ELMS champion Paul-Loup Chatin (who last raced for the team in 2015), Team WRT's Ferdinand Habsburg and former F1 driver Mick Schumacher. Mercedes-AMG factory driver Jules Gounon joined as reserve driver.
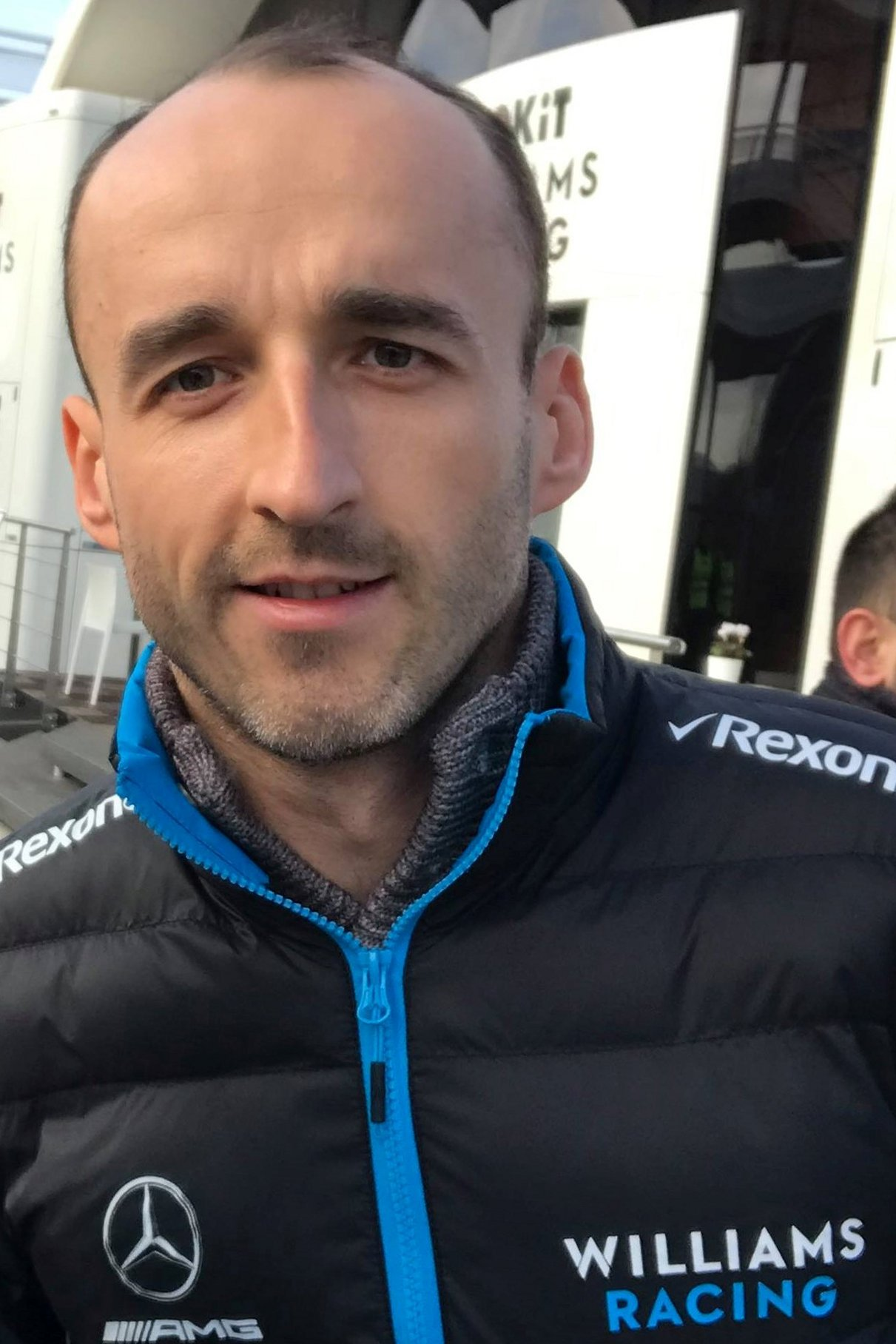
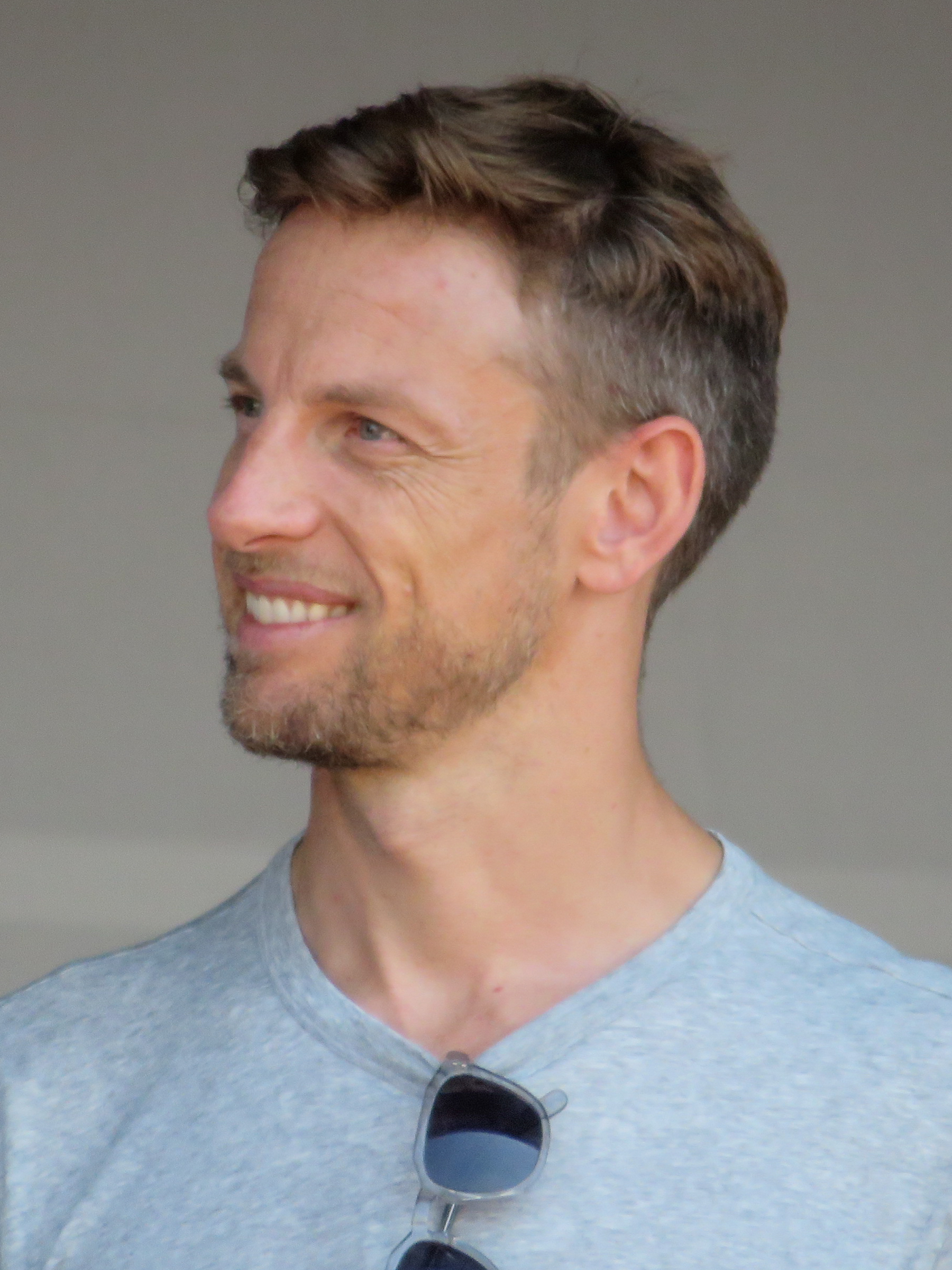
  Robert Kubica (left) and Jenson Button (right) were among the drivers making their Hypercar debut in 2024.
- Ferrari's main lineup was unchanged, while the additional third AF Corse car was piloted by Ferrari F1 reserve driver Robert Shwartzman, F1 race winner and reigning LMP2 champion Robert Kubica and new works driver Yifei Ye, who moved over from Hertz Team Jota.
- With Yifei Ye recruited by Ferrari and António Félix da Costa stepping away from WEC to focus on Formula E, Jota hired IndyCar driver Callum Ilott and LMP1 race winner Norman Nato to escort Will Stevens. The team's second car was filled by 2009 Formula One World Champion Jenson Button and LMP2 graduates Phil Hanson and Oliver Rasmussen.
- Lamborghini's debut in WEC and IMSA saw the addition of several drivers to its books. Mirko Bortolotti, a decorated GT racer for the brand, spearheaded the WEC lineup alongside ex-F1 driver Daniil Kvyat and DTM and Formula E race winner Edoardo Mortara. Mortara missed the 6 Hours of Spa due to his Formula E commitments, with works IMSA driver Andrea Caldarelli stepping in.
- At Peugeot, Gustavo Menezes was replaced with reserve driver Stoffel Vandoorne, who had already debuted for the team at the 2023 6 Hours of Fuji. Paul di Resta and Nico Müller also swapped cars for 2024.
- Double GTE Pro champion Gianmaria Bruni departed the WEC after a decade and switched to Proton's IMSA GTP programme. Porsche-contracted driver Julien Andlauer stepped up to accompany Jani and Tincknell in the No. 99 car.
- Following Vanwall's denied entry and Glickenhaus' withdrawal, none of their drivers from the 2023 season would return to the WEC for 2024.
  Mid-season changes
- Ferdinand Habsburg fractured two vertebrae in a testing crash in late March. Alpine reserve driver Jules Gounon stood in for the Austrian at Imola and Spa.
- Mike Conway was forced to miss the 24 Hours of Le Mans after injuring his ribs and collarbone in a cycling incident. Former Toyota driver José María López was drafted in to substitute for the Briton.
- Following Isotta Fraschini's withdrawal, Antonio Serravalle joined rival team Proton Competition as reserve driver.
- A pre-planned move saw Alpine hand Jules Gounon two more runs, replacing Paul-Loup Chatin at Fuji and Charles Milesi in Bahrain. Milesi ultimately slotted in the No. 36 for the season finale, as Nicolas Lapierre announced his immediate retirement to take up the role of Alpine sporting director.

=== LMGT3 ===
Entrant	Car	Engine	Tyre	No.	Drivers	Rounds
(United States) Heart of Racing Team	Aston Martin Vantage AMR GT3 Evo	Aston Martin M177 4.0 L Turbo V8	G	27	(United Kingdom) Ian James	All
(United States) Heart of Racing Team	Aston Martin Vantage AMR GT3 Evo	Aston Martin M177 4.0 L Turbo V8	G	27	(Italy) Daniel Mancinelli	All
(United States) Heart of Racing Team	Aston Martin Vantage AMR GT3 Evo	Aston Martin M177 4.0 L Turbo V8	G	27	(Spain) Alex Riberas	All
(Japan) D'station Racing	Aston Martin Vantage AMR GT3 Evo	Aston Martin M177 4.0 L Turbo V8	G	777	(France) Erwan Bastard	All
(Japan) D'station Racing	Aston Martin Vantage AMR GT3 Evo	Aston Martin M177 4.0 L Turbo V8	G	777	(Denmark) Marco Sørensen	All
(Japan) D'station Racing	Aston Martin Vantage AMR GT3 Evo	Aston Martin M177 4.0 L Turbo V8	G	777	(France) Clément Mateu	1–3, 5–8
(Japan) D'station Racing	Aston Martin Vantage AMR GT3 Evo	Aston Martin M177 4.0 L Turbo V8	G	777	(Japan) Satoshi Hoshino	4
(Belgium) Team WRT	BMW M4 GT3	BMW P58 3.0 L Turbo I6	G	31	(Brazil) Augusto Farfus	All
(Belgium) Team WRT	BMW M4 GT3	BMW P58 3.0 L Turbo I6	G	31	(Indonesia) Sean Gelael	All
(Belgium) Team WRT	BMW M4 GT3	BMW P58 3.0 L Turbo I6	G	31	(United Kingdom) Darren Leung	All
(Belgium) Team WRT	BMW M4 GT3	BMW P58 3.0 L Turbo I6	G	46	(Oman) Ahmad Al Harthy	All
(Belgium) Team WRT	BMW M4 GT3	BMW P58 3.0 L Turbo I6	G	46	(Belgium) Maxime Martin	All
(Belgium) Team WRT	BMW M4 GT3	BMW P58 3.0 L Turbo I6	G	46	(Italy) Valentino Rossi	All
(Italy) Vista AF Corse	Ferrari 296 GT3	Ferrari F163CE 3.0 L Turbo V6	G	54	(Italy) Francesco Castellacci	All
(Italy) Vista AF Corse	Ferrari 296 GT3	Ferrari F163CE 3.0 L Turbo V6	G	54	(Switzerland) Thomas Flohr	All
(Italy) Vista AF Corse	Ferrari 296 GT3	Ferrari F163CE 3.0 L Turbo V6	G	54	(Italy) Davide Rigon	All
(Italy) Vista AF Corse	Ferrari 296 GT3	Ferrari F163CE 3.0 L Turbo V6	G	55	(France) François Hériau	All
(Italy) Vista AF Corse	Ferrari 296 GT3	Ferrari F163CE 3.0 L Turbo V6	G	55	(United States) Simon Mann	All
(Italy) Vista AF Corse	Ferrari 296 GT3	Ferrari F163CE 3.0 L Turbo V6	G	55	(Italy) Alessio Rovera	All
(United Kingdom) United Autosports	McLaren 720S GT3 Evo	McLaren M840T 4.0 L Turbo V8	G	59	(Brazil) Nicolas Costa	All
(United Kingdom) United Autosports	McLaren 720S GT3 Evo	McLaren M840T 4.0 L Turbo V8	G	59	(United Kingdom) James Cottingham	All
(United Kingdom) United Autosports	McLaren 720S GT3 Evo	McLaren M840T 4.0 L Turbo V8	G	59	(Switzerland) Grégoire Saucy	All
(United Kingdom) United Autosports	McLaren 720S GT3 Evo	McLaren M840T 4.0 L Turbo V8	G	95	(Chile) Nico Pino	All
(United Kingdom) United Autosports	McLaren 720S GT3 Evo	McLaren M840T 4.0 L Turbo V8	G	95	(Japan) Marino Sato	All
(United Kingdom) United Autosports	McLaren 720S GT3 Evo	McLaren M840T 4.0 L Turbo V8	G	95	(United Kingdom) Josh Caygill	1–3, 5–8
(United Kingdom) United Autosports	McLaren 720S GT3 Evo	McLaren M840T 4.0 L Turbo V8	G	95	(Japan) Hiroshi Hamaguchi	4
(Italy) Iron Lynx	Lamborghini Huracán GT3 Evo 2	Lamborghini DGF 5.2 L V10	G	60	(Italy) Matteo Cressoni	All
(Italy) Iron Lynx	Lamborghini Huracán GT3 Evo 2	Lamborghini DGF 5.2 L V10	G	60	(Italy) Claudio Schiavoni	All
(Italy) Iron Lynx	Lamborghini Huracán GT3 Evo 2	Lamborghini DGF 5.2 L V10	G	60	(France) Franck Perera	1–7
(Italy) Iron Lynx	Lamborghini Huracán GT3 Evo 2	Lamborghini DGF 5.2 L V10	G	60	(Italy) Matteo Cairoli	8
(Italy) Iron Dames	Lamborghini Huracán GT3 Evo 2	Lamborghini DGF 5.2 L V10	G	85	(Belgium) Sarah Bovy	All
(Italy) Iron Dames	Lamborghini Huracán GT3 Evo 2	Lamborghini DGF 5.2 L V10	G	85	(Denmark) Michelle Gatting	All
(Italy) Iron Dames	Lamborghini Huracán GT3 Evo 2	Lamborghini DGF 5.2 L V10	G	85	(France) Doriane Pin	1–2
(Italy) Iron Dames	Lamborghini Huracán GT3 Evo 2	Lamborghini DGF 5.2 L V10	G	85	(Switzerland) Rahel Frey	3–8
(Germany) Proton Competition	Ford Mustang GT3	Ford Coyote 5.4 L V8	G	77	(United Kingdom) Ben Barker	All
(Germany) Proton Competition	Ford Mustang GT3	Ford Coyote 5.4 L V8	G	77	(United States) Ryan Hardwick	All
(Germany) Proton Competition	Ford Mustang GT3	Ford Coyote 5.4 L V8	G	77	(Canada) Zacharie Robichon	All
(Germany) Proton Competition	Ford Mustang GT3	Ford Coyote 5.4 L V8	G	88	(Norway) Dennis Olsen	All
(Germany) Proton Competition	Ford Mustang GT3	Ford Coyote 5.4 L V8	G	88	(Denmark) Mikkel O. Pedersen	1–7
(Germany) Proton Competition	Ford Mustang GT3	Ford Coyote 5.4 L V8	G	88	(Italy) Giorgio Roda	1–4, 8
(Germany) Proton Competition	Ford Mustang GT3	Ford Coyote 5.4 L V8	G	88	(Germany) Christian Ried	5, 7
(Germany) Proton Competition	Ford Mustang GT3	Ford Coyote 5.4 L V8	G	88	(United States) Ben Keating	6
(Germany) Proton Competition	Ford Mustang GT3	Ford Coyote 5.4 L V8	G	88	(Italy) Giammarco Levorato	8
(France) Akkodis ASP Team	Lexus RC F GT3	Lexus 2UR-GSE 5.4 L V8	G	78	(France) Arnold Robin	All
(France) Akkodis ASP Team	Lexus RC F GT3	Lexus 2UR-GSE 5.4 L V8	G	78	(South Africa) Kelvin van der Linde	1–2, 4–8
(France) Akkodis ASP Team	Lexus RC F GT3	Lexus 2UR-GSE 5.4 L V8	G	78	Timur Boguslavskiy	1–2, 4
(France) Akkodis ASP Team	Lexus RC F GT3	Lexus 2UR-GSE 5.4 L V8	G	78	(Austria) Clemens Schmid	3, 5–7
(France) Akkodis ASP Team	Lexus RC F GT3	Lexus 2UR-GSE 5.4 L V8	G	78	(Japan) Ritomo Miyata	3
(France) Akkodis ASP Team	Lexus RC F GT3	Lexus 2UR-GSE 5.4 L V8	G	78	(Denmark) Conrad Laursen	8
(France) Akkodis ASP Team	Lexus RC F GT3	Lexus 2UR-GSE 5.4 L V8	G	87	(Japan) Takeshi Kimura	All
(France) Akkodis ASP Team	Lexus RC F GT3	Lexus 2UR-GSE 5.4 L V8	G	87	(France) Esteban Masson	All
(France) Akkodis ASP Team	Lexus RC F GT3	Lexus 2UR-GSE 5.4 L V8	G	87	(Argentina) José María López	1–3, 5–8
(France) Akkodis ASP Team	Lexus RC F GT3	Lexus 2UR-GSE 5.4 L V8	G	87	(United Kingdom) Jack Hawksworth	4
(United Kingdom) TF Sport	Chevrolet Corvette Z06 GT3.R	Chevrolet LT6.R 5.5 L V8	G	81	(Angola) Rui Andrade	All
(United Kingdom) TF Sport	Chevrolet Corvette Z06 GT3.R	Chevrolet LT6.R 5.5 L V8	G	81	(Republic of Ireland) Charlie Eastwood	All
(United Kingdom) TF Sport	Chevrolet Corvette Z06 GT3.R	Chevrolet LT6.R 5.5 L V8	G	81	(Belgium) Tom Van Rompuy	All
(United Kingdom) TF Sport	Chevrolet Corvette Z06 GT3.R	Chevrolet LT6.R 5.5 L V8	G	82	(France) Sébastien Baud	All
(United Kingdom) TF Sport	Chevrolet Corvette Z06 GT3.R	Chevrolet LT6.R 5.5 L V8	G	82	(Spain) Daniel Juncadella	All
(United Kingdom) TF Sport	Chevrolet Corvette Z06 GT3.R	Chevrolet LT6.R 5.5 L V8	G	82	(Japan) Hiroshi Koizumi	All
(Germany) Manthey EMA	Porsche 911 GT3 R (992)	Porsche M97/80 4.2 L Flat-6	G	91	(Austria) Richard Lietz	All
(Germany) Manthey EMA	Porsche 911 GT3 R (992)	Porsche M97/80 4.2 L Flat-6	G	91	(Netherlands) Morris Schuring	All
(Germany) Manthey EMA	Porsche 911 GT3 R (992)	Porsche M97/80 4.2 L Flat-6	G	91	(Australia) Yasser Shahin	All
(Lithuania) Manthey PureRxcing	Porsche 911 GT3 R (992)	Porsche M97/80 4.2 L Flat-6	G	92	(Austria) Klaus Bachler	All
(Lithuania) Manthey PureRxcing	Porsche 911 GT3 R (992)	Porsche M97/80 4.2 L Flat-6	G	92	(Saint Kitts and Nevis) Alex Malykhin (Note: Malykhin is Belarusian, but he competes under a Kittitian licence as Belarusian national emblems were banned by the FIA following the Russian invasion of Ukraine.)	All
(Lithuania) Manthey PureRxcing	Porsche 911 GT3 R (992)	Porsche M97/80 4.2 L Flat-6	G	92	(Germany) Joel Sturm	All

== Results and standings ==
=== Race results ===
The highest finishing competitor entered in the World Endurance Championship is listed below. Invitational entries may have finished ahead of WEC competitors in individual races.

Rnd.	Circuit	Hypercar Winners	LMGT3 Winners	Report
1	(Qatar) Losail	(Germany) No. 6 Porsche Penske Motorsport	(Lithuania) No. 92 Manthey PureRxcing	Report
1	(Qatar) Losail	(France) Kévin Estre (Germany) André Lotterer (Belgium) Laurens Vanthoor	(Austria) Klaus Bachler (Saint Kitts and Nevis) Alex Malykhin (Germany) Joel Sturm	Report
2	(Italy) Imola	(Japan) No. 7 Toyota Gazoo Racing	(Belgium) No. 31 Team WRT	Report
2	(Italy) Imola	(United Kingdom) Mike Conway (Japan) Kamui Kobayashi (Netherlands) Nyck de Vries	(Brazil) Augusto Farfus (Indonesia) Sean Gelael (United Kingdom) Darren Leung	Report
3	(Belgium) Spa	(United Kingdom) No. 12 Hertz Team Jota	(Germany) No. 91 Manthey EMA	Report
3	(Belgium) Spa	(United Kingdom) Callum Ilott (United Kingdom) Will Stevens	(Austria) Richard Lietz (Netherlands) Morris Schuring (Australia) Yasser Shahin	Report
4	(France) Le Mans	(Italy) No. 50 Ferrari AF Corse	(Germany) No. 91 Manthey EMA	Report
4	(France) Le Mans	(Italy) Antonio Fuoco (Spain) Miguel Molina (Denmark) Nicklas Nielsen	(Austria) Richard Lietz (Netherlands) Morris Schuring (Australia) Yasser Shahin	Report
5	(Brazil) São Paulo	(Japan) No. 8 Toyota Gazoo Racing	(Lithuania) No. 92 Manthey PureRxcing	Report
5	(Brazil) São Paulo	(Switzerland) Sébastien Buemi (New Zealand) Brendon Hartley (Japan) Ryō Hirakawa	(Austria) Klaus Bachler (Saint Kitts and Nevis) Alex Malykhin (Germany) Joel Sturm	Report
6	(United States) Austin	(Italy) No. 83 AF Corse	(United States) No. 27 Heart of Racing Team	Report
6	(United States) Austin	(Poland) Robert Kubica (Israel) Robert Shwartzman (China) Yifei Ye	(United Kingdom) Ian James (Italy) Daniel Mancinelli (Spain) Alex Riberas	Report
7	(Japan) Fuji	(Germany) No. 6 Porsche Penske Motorsport	(Italy) No. 54 Vista AF Corse	Report
7	(Japan) Fuji	(France) Kévin Estre (Germany) André Lotterer (Belgium) Laurens Vanthoor	(Italy) Francesco Castellacci (Switzerland) Thomas Flohr (Italy) Davide Rigon	Report
8	Bahrain	(Japan) No. 8 Toyota Gazoo Racing	(Italy) No. 55 Vista AF Corse	Report
8	Bahrain	(Switzerland) Sébastien Buemi (New Zealand) Brendon Hartley (Japan) Ryō Hirakawa	(France) François Hériau (United States) Simon Mann (Italy) Alessio Rovera	Report

=== Drivers' championships ===
An FIA World Championship is awarded to the winning drivers in the Hypercar category. An FIA Endurance Trophy is awarded to the winning drivers in the LMGT3 category.

Points systems
Duration	1st	2nd	3rd	4th	5th	6th	7th	8th	9th	10th	Pole
6 Hours	25	18	15	12	10	8	6	4	2	1	**1**
8–10 Hours	38	27	23	18	15	12	9	6	3	2	**1**
24 Hours	50	36	30	24	20	16	12	8	4	2	**1**

==== Hypercar World Endurance Drivers' Championship ====
Pos.	Driver	Team	QAT (Qatar)	IMO (Italy)	SPA (Belgium)	LMS (France)	SÃO (Brazil)	COA (United States)	FUJ (Japan)	BHR (Bahrain)	Points
1	(France) Kévin Estre	(Germany) Porsche Penske Motorsport	1	2	2	**4**	2	6	1	10	152
1	(Germany) André Lotterer	(Germany) Porsche Penske Motorsport	1	2	2	**4**	2	6	1	10	152
1	(Belgium) Laurens Vanthoor	(Germany) Porsche Penske Motorsport	1	2	2	**4**	2	6	1	10	152
2	(Italy) Antonio Fuoco	(Italy) Ferrari AF Corse	6	**4**	3	1	6	3	9	11	115
2	(Spain) Miguel Molina	(Italy) Ferrari AF Corse	6	**4**	3	1	6	3	9	11	115
2	(Denmark) Nicklas Nielsen	(Italy) Ferrari AF Corse	6	**4**	3	1	6	3	9	11	115
3	(Japan) Kamui Kobayashi	(Japan) Toyota Gazoo Racing	5	1	7	2	**4**	2	Ret	Ret	113
3	(Netherlands) Nyck de Vries	(Japan) Toyota Gazoo Racing	5	1	7	2	**4**	2	Ret	Ret	113
4	(Switzerland) Sébastien Buemi	(Japan) Toyota Gazoo Racing	8	5	6	5	1	15	10	**1**	109
4	(New Zealand) Brendon Hartley	(Japan) Toyota Gazoo Racing	8	5	6	5	1	15	10	**1**	109
4	(Japan) Ryō Hirakawa	(Japan) Toyota Gazoo Racing	8	5	6	5	1	15	10	**1**	109
5	(Australia) Matt Campbell	(Germany) Porsche Penske Motorsport	**3**	3	**Ret**	6	3	7	Ret	2	104
5	(Denmark) Michael Christensen	(Germany) Porsche Penske Motorsport	**3**	3	**Ret**	6	3	7	Ret	2	104
5	(France) Frédéric Makowiecki	(Germany) Porsche Penske Motorsport	**3**	3	**Ret**	6	3	7	Ret	2	104
6	(United Kingdom) Mike Conway	(Japan) Toyota Gazoo Racing	5	1	7		**4**	2	Ret	Ret	77
7	(United Kingdom) Callum Ilott	(United Kingdom) Hertz Team Jota	2	14	1	8	18	Ret	5	13	70
7	(United Kingdom) Will Stevens	(United Kingdom) Hertz Team Jota	2	14	1	8	18	Ret	5	13	70
8	(United Kingdom) James Calado	(Italy) Ferrari AF Corse	12	7	4	3	5	**Ret**	Ret	14	59
8	(Italy) Antonio Giovinazzi	(Italy) Ferrari AF Corse	12	7	4	3	5	**Ret**	Ret	14	59
8	(Italy) Alessandro Pier Guidi	(Italy) Ferrari AF Corse	12	7	4	3	5	**Ret**	Ret	14	59
9	(Poland) Robert Kubica	(Italy) AF Corse	4	8	8	Ret	11	1	12	8	57
9	(Israel) Robert Shwartzman	(Italy) AF Corse	4	8	8	Ret	11	1	12	8	57
9	(China) Yifei Ye	(Italy) AF Corse	4	8	8	Ret	11	1	12	8	57
10	(France) Norman Nato	(United Kingdom) Hertz Team Jota	2	14		8	18	Ret	5	13	45
11	(Austria) Ferdinand Habsburg	(France) Alpine Endurance Team	7			Ret	12	5	7	4	43
12	(Denmark) Mikkel Jensen	(France) Peugeot TotalEnergies	DSQ	9	10	12	8	12	4	3	42
12	(Switzerland) Nico Müller	(France) Peugeot TotalEnergies	DSQ	9	10	12	8	12	4	3	42
13	(France) Jean-Éric Vergne	(France) Peugeot TotalEnergies	DSQ	9		12	8	12	4	3	41
14	(Switzerland) Raffaele Marciello	(Belgium) BMW M Team WRT	14	DSQ	11	Ret	9	8	2	5	39
14	(Belgium) Dries Vanthoor	(Belgium) BMW M Team WRT	14	DSQ	11	Ret	9	8	2	5	39
14	(Germany) Marco Wittmann	(Belgium) BMW M Team WRT	14	DSQ	11	Ret	9	8	2	5	39
15	(New Zealand) Earl Bamber	(United States) Cadillac Racing	DSQ	10	Ret	7	13	4	**Ret**	6	38
16	(Argentina) José María López	(Japan) Toyota Gazoo Racing				2					36
17	(France) Charles Milesi	(France) Alpine Endurance Team	7	13	9	Ret	12	5	7	9	30
18	(France) Paul-Loup Chatin	(France) Alpine Endurance Team	7	13	9	Ret	12	5 (Note: Chatin did not fulfil his mandated minimum drive time at Lone Star Le Mans, meaning that he did not receive points for that event.)		4	29
19	(United Kingdom) Jenson Button	(United Kingdom) Hertz Team Jota	Ret	11	Ret	9	7	10	6	7	28
19	(United Kingdom) Phil Hanson	(United Kingdom) Hertz Team Jota	Ret	11	Ret	9	7	10	6	7	28
19	(Denmark) Oliver Rasmussen	(United Kingdom) Hertz Team Jota	Ret	11	Ret	9	7	10	6	7	28
20	(United Kingdom) Alex Lynn	(United States) Cadillac Racing	DSQ	10	Ret	7	13	4	**Ret**	6 (Note: Lynn did not fulfil his mandated minimum drive time at the 8 Hours of Bahrain, meaning that he did not receive points for that event.)	26
21	(France) Jules Gounon	(France) Alpine Endurance Team		13	9 (Note: Gounon did not fulfil his mandated minimum drive time at the 6 Hours of Spa-Francorchamps, meaning that he did not receive points for that event.)				7	4	24
22	(Germany) Mick Schumacher	(France) Alpine Endurance Team	11	16	12	Ret	10	9	3	9	21
22	(France) Matthieu Vaxivière	(France) Alpine Endurance Team	11	16	12	Ret	10	9	3	9	21
23	(France) Nicolas Lapierre	(France) Alpine Endurance Team	11	16	12	Ret	10	9	3		18
24	(France) Julien Andlauer	(Germany) Proton Competition	9	Ret	5	14	15	11	11	12	13
24	(Switzerland) Neel Jani	(Germany) Proton Competition	9	Ret	5	14	15	11	11	12	13
25	(France) Sébastien Bourdais	(United States) Cadillac Racing	DSQ							6	12
26	(Spain) Álex Palou	(United States) Cadillac Racing				7					12
27	(Netherlands) Robin Frijns	(Belgium) BMW M Team WRT	10	6	13	NC	14	13	Ret	Ret	10
27	(Germany) René Rast	(Belgium) BMW M Team WRT	10	6	13	NC	14	13	Ret	Ret	10
27	(South Africa) Sheldon van der Linde	(Belgium) BMW M Team WRT	10	6	13	NC	14	13	Ret	Ret	10
28	(United Kingdom) Paul di Resta	(France) Peugeot TotalEnergies	15	15	14	11	16	Ret	8	Ret	4
28	(France) Loïc Duval	(France) Peugeot TotalEnergies	15	15	14	11	16	Ret	8	Ret	4
29	(Belgium) Stoffel Vandoorne	(France) Peugeot TotalEnergies	15	15		11	16	Ret	8	Ret	4
30	(United Kingdom) Harry Tincknell	(Germany) Proton Competition	9	Ret		14		11	11	12	3
31	(Italy) Mirko Bortolotti	(Italy) Lamborghini Iron Lynx	13	12	Ret	10	17	14	Ret	Ret	2
31	Daniil Kvyat	(Italy) Lamborghini Iron Lynx	13	12	Ret	10	17	14	Ret	Ret	2
32	(Italy) Edoardo Mortara	(Italy) Lamborghini Iron Lynx	13	12		10	17	14	Ret	Ret	2
33	(Thailand) Carl Bennett	(Italy) Isotta Fraschini	Ret	17	15	13	Ret				0
33	(Canada) Antonio Serravalle	(Italy) Isotta Fraschini	Ret	17	15	13	Ret				0
33	(France) Jean-Karl Vernay	(Italy) Isotta Fraschini	Ret	17	15	13	Ret				0
34	(Italy) Andrea Caldarelli	(Italy) Lamborghini Iron Lynx			Ret						0
Pos.	Driver	Team	QAT (Qatar)	IMO (Italy)	SPA (Belgium)	LMS (France)	SÃO (Brazil)	COA (United States)	FUJ (Japan)	BHR (Bahrain)	Points

Colour	Result
Gold	Winner
Silver	Second place
Bronze	Third place
Green	Points classification
Blue	Non-points classification
Blue	Non-classified finish (NC)
Purple	Retired, not classified (Ret)
Red	Did not qualify (DNQ)
Red	Did not pre-qualify (DNPQ)
Black	Disqualified (DSQ)
White	Did not start (DNS)
White	Withdrew (WD)
White	Race cancelled (C)
Blank	Did not practice (DNP)
Blank	Did not arrive (DNA)
Blank	Excluded (EX)

**Bold** - Pole position

==== FIA Endurance Trophy for LMGT3 Drivers ====
Pos.	Driver	Team	QAT (Qatar)	IMO (Italy)	SPA (Belgium)	LMS (France)	SÃO (Brazil)	COA (United States)	FUJ (Japan)	BHR (Bahrain)	Points
1	(Austria) Klaus Bachler	(Lithuania) Manthey PureRxcing	1	**3**	2	**10**	1	2	2	9	139
1	(Saint Kitts and Nevis) Alex Malykhin	(Lithuania) Manthey PureRxcing	1	**3**	2	**10**	1	2	2	9	139
1	(Germany) Joel Sturm	(Lithuania) Manthey PureRxcing	1	**3**	2	**10**	1	2	2	9	139
2	(Austria) Richard Lietz	(Germany) Manthey EMA	15	16	1	1	12	3	14	5	105
2	(Netherlands) Morris Schuring	(Germany) Manthey EMA	15	16	1	1	12	3	14	5	105
2	(Australia) Yasser Shahin	(Germany) Manthey EMA	15	16	1	1	12	3	14	5	105
3	(France) François Hériau	(Italy) Vista AF Corse	7	4	13	5	6	10	**6**	1	97
3	(United States) Simon Mann	(Italy) Vista AF Corse	7	4	13	5	6	10	**6**	1	97
3	(Italy) Alessio Rovera	(Italy) Vista AF Corse	7	4	13	5	6	10	**6**	1	97
4	(Brazil) Augusto Farfus	(Belgium) Team WRT	6	1	Ret	2	10	5	10	13	85
4	(Indonesia) Sean Gelael	(Belgium) Team WRT	6	1	Ret	2	10	5	10	13	85
4	(United Kingdom) Darren Leung	(Belgium) Team WRT	6	1	Ret	2	10	5	10	13	85
5	(United Kingdom) Ian James	(United States) Heart of Racing Team	2	5	11	Ret	2	**1**	9	11	83
5	(Italy) Daniel Mancinelli	(United States) Heart of Racing Team	2	5	11	Ret	2	**1**	9	11	83
5	(Spain) Alex Riberas	(United States) Heart of Racing Team	2	5	11	Ret	2	**1**	9	11	83
6	(Oman) Ahmad Al Harthy	(Belgium) Team WRT	4	2	Ret	Ret	5	NC	3	14	61
6	(Belgium) Maxime Martin	(Belgium) Team WRT	4	2	Ret	Ret	5	NC	3	14	61
6	(Italy) Valentino Rossi	(Belgium) Team WRT	4	2	Ret	Ret	5	NC	3	14	61
7	(Italy) Francesco Castellacci	(Italy) Vista AF Corse	5	12	6	Ret	15	Ret	1	7	57
7	(Switzerland) Thomas Flohr	(Italy) Vista AF Corse	5	12	6	Ret	15	Ret	1	7	57
7	(Italy) Davide Rigon	(Italy) Vista AF Corse	5	12	6	Ret	15	Ret	1	7	57
8	(Belgium) Sarah Bovy	(Italy) Iron Dames	8	Ret	**5**	4	**Ret**	13	5	10	54
8	(Denmark) Michelle Gatting	(Italy) Iron Dames	8	Ret	**5**	4	**Ret**	13	5	10	54
9	(Brazil) Nicolas Costa	(United Kingdom) United Autosports	14	11	4	Ret	4	4	8	6	52
9	(United Kingdom) James Cottingham	(United Kingdom) United Autosports	14	11	4	Ret	4	4	8	6	52
9	(Switzerland) Grégoire Saucy	(United Kingdom) United Autosports	14	11	4	Ret	4	4	8	6	52
10	(Angola) Rui Andrade	(United Kingdom) TF Sport	**Ret**	7	Ret	12	8	Ret	4	2	50
10	(Republic of Ireland) Charlie Eastwood	(United Kingdom) TF Sport	**Ret**	7	Ret	12	8	Ret	4	2	50
10	(Belgium) Tom Van Rompuy	(United Kingdom) TF Sport	**Ret**	7	Ret	12	8	Ret	4	2	50
11	(France) Erwan Bastard	(Japan) D'station Racing	3	10	7	7	9	Ret	7	12	50
11	(Denmark) Marco Sørensen	(Japan) D'station Racing	3	10	7	7	9	Ret	7	12	50
12	(Switzerland) Rahel Frey	(Italy) Iron Dames			**5**	4	**Ret**	13	5	10	48
13	(France) Clément Mateu	(Japan) D'station Racing	3	10	7		9	Ret	7	12	38
14	(France) Sébastien Baud	(United Kingdom) TF Sport	10	8	12	9	Ret	8	Ret	3	37
14	(Spain) Daniel Juncadella	(United Kingdom) TF Sport	10	8	12	9	Ret	8	Ret	3	37
14	(Japan) Hiroshi Koizumi	(United Kingdom) TF Sport	10	8	12	9	Ret	8	Ret	3	37
15	(Norway) Dennis Olsen	(Germany) Proton Competition	9	Ret	8	3	13	NC	16	Ret	37
16	(Denmark) Mikkel O. Pedersen	(Germany) Proton Competition	9	Ret	8	3	13	NC	16		37
17	(Italy) Giorgio Roda	(Germany) Proton Competition	9	Ret	8	3				Ret	37
18	(Chile) Nico Pino	(United Kingdom) United Autosports	13	6	Ret	Ret	3	7	17	**8**	36
18	(Japan) Marino Sato	(United Kingdom) United Autosports	13	6	Ret	Ret	3	7	17	**8**	36
18	(United Kingdom) Josh Caygill	(United Kingdom) United Autosports	13	6	Ret		3	7	17	**8**	36
19	(Italy) Matteo Cressoni	(Italy) Iron Lynx	12	13	3	13	14	12	13	4	33
19	(Italy) Claudio Schiavoni	(Italy) Iron Lynx	12	13	3	13	14	12	13	4	33
20	(France) Arnold Robin	(France) Akkodis ASP Team	Ret	14	10	6	WD	9	11	Ret	19
21	(Italy) Matteo Cairoli	(Italy) Iron Lynx								4	18
22	(United Kingdom) Ben Barker	(Germany) Proton Competition	11	9	9	14	7	6	15	Ret	18
22	(United States) Ryan Hardwick	(Germany) Proton Competition	11	9	9	14	7	6	15	Ret	18
22	(Canada) Zacharie Robichon	(Germany) Proton Competition	11	9	9	14	7	6	15	Ret	18
23	(South Africa) Kelvin van der Linde	(France) Akkodis ASP Team	Ret	14		6	WD	9	11	Ret	18
24	Timur Boguslavskiy	(France) Akkodis ASP Team	Ret	14		6					16
25	(France) Franck Perera	(Italy) Iron Lynx	12	13	3	13	14	12	13		15
26	(Japan) Satoshi Hoshino	(Japan) D'station Racing				7					12
27	(Japan) Takeshi Kimura	(France) Akkodis ASP Team	16	15	14	8	11	11	12	Ret	8
27	(France) Esteban Masson	(France) Akkodis ASP Team	16	15	14	8	11	11	12	Ret	8
28	(United Kingdom) Jack Hawksworth	(France) Akkodis ASP Team				8					8
29	(France) Doriane Pin	(Italy) Iron Dames	8	Ret							6
30	(Austria) Clemens Schmid	(France) Akkodis ASP Team			10		WD	9	11		3
31	(Japan) Ritomo Miyata	(France) Akkodis ASP Team			10						1
32	(Argentina) José María López	(France) Akkodis ASP Team	16	15	14		11	11	12	Ret	0
33	(Germany) Christian Ried	(Germany) Proton Competition					13		16		0
34	(Japan) Hiroshi Hamaguchi	(United Kingdom) United Autosports				Ret					0
35	(United States) Ben Keating	(Germany) Proton Competition						NC			0
36	(Italy) Giammarco Levorato	(Germany) Proton Competition								Ret	0
37	(Denmark) Conrad Laursen	(France) Akkodis ASP Team								Ret	0
Pos.	Driver	Team	QAT (Qatar)	IMO (Italy)	SPA (Belgium)	LMS (France)	SÃO (Brazil)	COA (United States)	FUJ (Japan)	BHR (Bahrain)	Points

=== Manufacturers' and teams' championships ===
A world championship was awarded for Hypercar manufacturers. An FIA World Cup was awarded for customer Hypercar class teams. An FIA Endurance Trophy was awarded to LMGT3 teams.

==== Hypercar World Endurance Manufacturers' Championship ====
Points are awarded only to the highest finishing competitor from each manufacturer. Privateer entries are made invisible.

Pos.	Manufacturer	QAT (Qatar)	IMO (Italy)	SPA (Belgium)	LMS (France)	SÃO (Brazil)	COA (United States)	FUJ (Japan)	BHR (Bahrain)	Points
1	(Japan) Toyota	3	1	4	2	**1**	1	8	**1**	190
2	(Germany) Porsche	**1**	2	**1**	**4**	2	5	1	2	188
3	(Italy) Ferrari	4	**4**	2	1	5	**2**	7	9	137
4	(France) Alpine	5	11	6	Ret	9	4	3	4	70
5	(Germany) BMW	7	6	8	NC	8	7	2	5	64
6	(France) Peugeot	12	8	7	9	7	9	4	3	57
7	(United States) Cadillac	DSQ	9	Ret	7	11	3	**Ret**	6	42
8	(Italy) Lamborghini	10	10	Ret	8	14	11	Ret	Ret	11
9	(Italy) Isotta Fraschini	Ret	14	12	11	Ret				0
Pos.	Manufacturer	QAT (Qatar)	IMO (Italy)	SPA (Belgium)	LMS (France)	SÃO (Brazil)	COA (United States)	FUJ (Japan)	BHR (Bahrain)	Points

==== FIA World Cup for Hypercar Teams ====
Pos.	Car	Team	QAT (Qatar)	IMO (Italy)	SPA (Belgium)	LMS (France)	SÃO (Brazil)	COA (United States)	FUJ (Japan)	BHR (Bahrain)	Points
1	12	(United Kingdom) Hertz Team Jota	1	3	1	1	4	NC	1	4	183
2	38	(United Kingdom) Hertz Team Jota	Ret	2	Ret	2	1	2	2	1	153
3	83	(Italy) AF Corse	2	1	3	Ret	2	1	4	2	149
4	99	(Germany) Proton Competition	3	Ret	2	3	3	3	3	3	139
Pos.	Car	Team	QAT (Qatar)	IMO (Italy)	SPA (Belgium)	LMS (France)	SÃO (Brazil)	COA (United States)	FUJ (Japan)	BHR (Bahrain)	Points

==== FIA Endurance Trophy for LMGT3 Teams ====
Pos.	Car	Team	QAT (Qatar)	IMO (Italy)	SPA (Belgium)	LMS (France)	SÃO (Brazil)	COA (United States)	FUJ (Japan)	BHR (Bahrain)	Points
1	92	(Lithuania) Manthey PureRxcing	1	**3**	2	**10**	1	2	2	9	139
2	91	(Germany) Manthey EMA	15	16	1	1	12	3	14	5	105
3	55	(Italy) Vista AF Corse	7	4	13	5	6	10	**6**	1	97
4	31	(Belgium) Team WRT	6	1	Ret	2	10	5	10	13	85
5	27	(United States) Heart of Racing Team	2	5	11	Ret	2	**1**	9	11	83
6	46	(Belgium) Team WRT	4	2	Ret	Ret	5	NC	3	14	61
7	54	(Italy) Vista AF Corse	5	12	6	Ret	15	Ret	1	7	57
8	85	(Italy) Iron Dames	8	Ret	**5**	4	**Ret**	13	5	10	54
9	59	(United Kingdom) United Autosports	14	11	4	Ret	4	4	8	6	52
10	81	(United Kingdom) TF Sport	**Ret**	7	Ret	11	8	Ret	4	2	50
11	777	(Japan) D'station Racing	3	10	7	7	9	Ret	7	12	50
12	82	(United Kingdom) TF Sport	10	8	12	9	Ret	8	Ret	3	37
13	88	(Germany) Proton Competition	9	Ret	8	3	13	NC	16	Ret	37
14	95	(United Kingdom) United Autosports	13	6	Ret	Ret	3	7	17	**8**	36
15	60	(Italy) Iron Lynx	12	13	3	12	14	12	13	4	33
16	78	(France) Akkodis ASP Team	Ret	14	10	6	WD	9	11	Ret	19
17	77	(Germany) Proton Competition	11	9	9	13	7	6	15	Ret	18
18	87	(France) Akkodis ASP Team	16	15	14	8	11	11	12	Ret	8
Pos.	Car	Team	QAT (Qatar)	IMO (Italy)	SPA (Belgium)	LMS (France)	SÃO (Brazil)	COA (United States)	FUJ (Japan)	BHR (Bahrain)	Points

== See also ==
- 2024 IMSA SportsCar Championship
