= 2022 6 Hours of Fuji =

Endurance sports car race

Layout of the Fuji Speedway

The 2022 6 Hours of Fuji was an endurance sports car race that was held at Fuji Speedway on 11 September. It was the fifth round of the 2022 FIA World Endurance Championship.

== Entry list ==
Renger van der Zande stood in for Nico Müller in the #10 Vector Sport Oreca, who had opted to attend the 2022 DTM Spa round.

René Rast and Nick Cassidy also missed the race due to clashes with DTM, with Davide Rigon replacing the latter in the #54 AF Corse 488 GTE.

James Rossiter continued to drive for Peugeot Sport in the #94 9X8 following Kevin Magnussen's commitment to Formula One.

Glickenhaus opted not to attend due to the significant increase in costs associated with shipping.

== Schedule ==
| Date | Time (local: JST) | Event |
|---|---|---|
| Friday, 9 September | 11:00 | Free Practice 1 |
| Friday, 9 September | 15:30 | Free Practice 2 |
| Saturday, 10 September | 10:20 | Free Practice 3 |
| Saturday, 10 September | 14:40 | Qualifying - LM GTE Am & Pro |
| Saturday, 10 September | 15:00 | Qualifying - LMH, LMDh, LMP2 |
| Sunday, 11 September | 11:00 | Race |

== Qualifying ==
Pole position winners in each class are marked in bold.

| Pos | Class | No. | Team | Time | Gap | Grid |
|---|---|---|---|---|---|---|
| 1 | **Hypercar** | **7** | **(Japan) Toyota Gazoo Racing** | **1:29.234** | - | **1** |
| 2 | Hypercar | 8 | (Japan) Toyota Gazoo Racing | 1:29.254 | +0.020 | 2 |
| 3 | Hypercar | 36 | (France) Alpine Elf Team | 1:29.446 | +0.212 | 3 |
| 4 | Hypercar | 93 | (France) Peugeot TotalEnergies | 1:30.000 | +0.766 | 4 |
| 5 | Hypercar | 94 | (France) Peugeot TotalEnergies | 1:30.152 | +0.918 | 5 |
| 6 | **LMP2** | **38** | **(United Kingdom) JOTA** | **1:31.649** | **+2.415** | **6** |
| 7 | LMP2 | 83 | (Italy) AF Corse | 1:31.929 | +2.695 | 7 |
| 8 | LMP2 | 41 | (Switzerland) RealTeam by WRT | 1:32.143 | +2.976 | 8 |
| 9 | LMP2 | 31 | (Belgium) WRT | 1:32.210 | +2.976 | 9 |
| 10 | LMP2 | 10 | (United Kingdom) Vector Sport | 1:32.297 | +3.063 | 10 |
| 11 | LMP2 | 22 | (United States) United Autosports USA | 1:32.337 | +3.103 | 11 |
| 12 | LMP2 | 23 | (United States) United Autosports USA | 1:32.342 | +3.108 | 12 |
| 13 | LMP2 | 28 | (United Kingdom) JOTA | 1:32.439 | +3.205 | 13 |
| 14 | LMP2 | 9 | (Italy) Prema Orlen Team | 1:32.479 | +3.245 | 14 |
| 15 | LMP2 | 1 | (France) Richard Mille Racing Team | 1:32.529 | +3.295 | 15 |
| 16 | LMP2 | 34 | (Poland) Inter Europol Competition | 1:32.800 | +3.566 | 16 |
| 17 | LMP2 | 45 | (Portugal) Algarve Pro Racing | 1:32.879 | +3.645 | 17 |
| 18 | LMP2 | 35 | (France) Ultimate | 1:33.155 | +3.921 | 18 |
| 19 | **LMGTE Pro** | **92** | **(Germany) Porsche GT Team** | **1:36.371** | **+7.137** | **19** |
| 20 | LMGTE Pro | 51 | (Italy) AF Corse | 1:36.566 | +7.332 | 20 |
| 21 | LMGTE Pro | 91 | (Germany) Porsche GT Team | 1:36.800 | +7.566 | 21 |
| 22 | LMGTE Pro | 52 | (Italy) AF Corse | 1:36.851 | +7.617 | 22 |
| 23 | LMGTE Pro | 64 | (United States) Corvette Racing | 1:37.127 | +7.893 | 23 |
| 24 | **LMGTE Am** | **33** | **(United Kingdom) TF Sport** | **1:39.309** | **+10.075** | **24** |
| 25 | LMGTE Am | 85 | (Italy) Iron Dames | 1:39.371 | +10.137 | 25 |
| 26 | LMGTE Am | 71 | (Italy) Spirit of Race | 1:39.461 | +10.227 | 26 |
| 27 | LMGTE Am | 777 | (Japan) D'Station Racing | 1:39.710 | +10.476 | 36 (Note: D'Station originally qualified 27th but was sent to the back of the grid following a post-race penalty.) |
| 28 | LMGTE Am | 46 | (Germany) Team Project 1 | 1:39.796 | +10.562 | 27 |
| 29 | LMGTE Am | 54 | (Italy) AF Corse | 1:39.809 | +10.575 | 28 |
| 30 | LMGTE Am | 56 | (Germany) Team Project 1 | 1:39.853 | +10.619 | 29 |
| 31 | LMGTE Am | 77 | (Germany) Dempsey-Proton Racing | 1:39.874 | +10.640 | 30 |
| 32 | LMGTE Am | 88 | (Germany) Dempsey-Proton Racing | 1:40.052 | +10.818 | 31 |
| 33 | LMGTE Am | 86 | (United Kingdom) GR Racing | 1:40.271 | +11.037 | 32 |
| 34 | LMGTE Am | 21 | (Italy) AF Corse | 1:40.418 | +11.184 | 33 |
| 35 | LMGTE Am | 60 | (Italy) Iron Lynx | 1:40.683 | +11.449 | 34 |
| 36 | LMGTE Am | 98 | (Canada) Northwest AMR | No time | — | 35 |

== Race ==
=== Race Report ===
==== Hour 1 ====
The start saw both Toyotas leading into the first corner and maintaining the lead towards the end of Lap 1 with the Alpine and Peugeots in tow. The #45 APR, going for an overtaking move locked up the rear wheels, sending the car sideways and making contact with the #28 Jota into Dunlop corner sending both cars off. The #51 Ferrari had managed to snatch the lead from the pole sitting #92 Porsche by Lap 2, while the #45 goes into the garage for repairs, the suspension wishbones shearing the bolts holding it to the tub, keeping it in the garage for a long time - rejoining the race at the 5h24m mark, though earning themselves a 2-minute stop and go penalty for the collision it caused.

By the 4th lap the 2nd place Toyota has extended the lead to the Alpine by 1.8 seconds, with the Peugeots trailing behind already with a 3.5 second deficit to the Alpine. In LMP2, the #31 WRT has established a sizeable lead while #38 Jota, with the #10 Vetor and both United cars following is in a close fight for 2nd place, while the 3 Aston Martins in GTEAm - #33,98 and 777 are also scrambling for 2nd place. Meanwhile, the two Peugeots were very close together with the #94 seemingly looking faster and stuck behind the #93, with Rossiter complaining on radio twice about the car's bouncing issues and being held back by his teammate Vergne killing the tyres, but being denied a switch of positions by the team - though the two cars would eventually swap positions some laps later.

On lap 10, the No. 92 car overtook the No. 51 to regain the GTE Pro lead. Meanwhile, the No. 60 Iron Lynx car spun but recovered and continued racing. The No. 85 Iron Dames car moved into second place in its class, competing with the No. 777 D'station car, before dropping to third behind the No. 98 Northwest car.

The #52 Ferrari does an optimistic lunge on the #91 at turn 1 of lap 12 though being denied the pass, all this time while the Corvette watches at the back of the Pro field, the car's pace taking a hit from the BoP reduction after Monza.

Meanwhile, bad luck for the #10 Vector, the car making slight contact with the #54 AF Corse - an incident that would later see the car getting a 5s penalty added to its next pitstop - dropping out of the fight and all the way down to 15th place. Further bad luck befalls the #64 with the car taking a drive through penalty for abusing track limits.

The close fight in GTEPro continues into lap 19, with the #51 Ferrari catching the slipstream and diving down the inside of the #92 at turn 1, successfully holding off the #92's attacks in the following corners to keep its lead; while the Porsche radio tells Estre to let the Ferrari go - and "not do anything stupid".

With the outside of the track not being filled with gravel like at Monza or Spa, GT drivers have found themselves pushing the track limits to gain an advantage - and many have pushed it too far. The #91 was the next to get a drive through penalty for the same reason as the #64 Corvette, serving it on the 24th lap with Bruni complaining on the radio - As the #92 also gets a warning for track limits abuse, leaving Ferrari the only team in the category without track limits violations so far.

The first pit cycle for the LMP2s came on lap 26, with #31 WRT still maintaining its lead after the stops. The #71 Spirit of Race GTEAm becomes the third car to take a drive through for track limits on lap 29, with the unfortunate Ferrari spinning at Dunlop earlier. While the #51 has pulled away from the lead after the move on lap 19, the #52 has since caught up and gave the #92 that previously lost the lead a second blow - with an almost copycat lunge down into turn 1 despite the #92's fierce defense and taking away its 2nd place, making it a Ferrari 1–2 in GTEPro near the end of the first hour. The #92 would drop down the order by quite a margin in the next 20 minutes, netting the car a solid 3rd place by the first GTE Pro pitstop.

With the Toyotas leading the Alpine by ~2s, which leads the #94 Peugeot by another 2 seconds - the #93 sitting in last 12 seconds behind its teammate. The first Hypercar pit came at the 5h04m mark with the Alpine entering the pits taking fuel only, with the Toyota #7 and Peugeot #93 following suit a lap later - followed by the #8 - taking fuel and left side tyres only and the #94, taking fuel only. Both Toyotas and the #93 took left side tyres only while the #94 Peugeot only took fuel, thus coming out of the pits ahead of the Alpine - that also only took fuel - behind the Toyotas - the #7 and #8 six seconds apart.

==== Hour 2 ====
The first GTE Pro pitstops came around 10 minutes after the first hour, with the #91 doing a driver change and dropping behind the #64 Corvette, which had a tense moment in the pits as the car was going slowly in the pitlane and had to be pushed into its box, likely having run out of fuel - losing 45 seconds in the pits. By the time the pit sequence was over, it was both Ferraris - #51 and #52 leading #92 and #91 - and the unfortunate #64 nearly 40 seconds behind.

The battle for the lead in GTEAm since the start of the race still continues with #777 and #98, now with their Bronze drivers Hoshino and Dalla Lana picking up the battle left by their top rated drivers, #33 still watching from behind.

Of the LMP2 frontrunners, the #28 was the first to stop for fuel at the second cycle, with #31 and #38 following in the next lap; the #9 Prema with a conservative fuel strategy was able to run a lap longer before pitting, taking fuel and all 4 tyres and coming out behind the leading cars #28 and #31, followed by the #38 at the 4h30m mark.

40 seconds ahead of the next car - the #94 Peugeot, the Toyotas were back with a half second within each other on lap 63, with the #7 piloted by Kobayashi following team orders and handing the lead to the faster #8 in the hands of Buemi, pulling out a 1.5 second gap in the next few laps.

The class lead battle between #777 and #98 effectively came to an end at the 4h16m mark, with the #98 being handed a drive through for track limits violations - the 4th so far in the race - before previously being overtaken on track by Ben Keating in the #33 a few minutes ago.

Meanwhile, the #36 is rapidly catching up to the podium sitting #94 Peugeot, closing the gap down to less than half a second on the 69th lap - a battle is very much on, as Rossiter complains on the radio about "dead tyres" while both cars navigate their way through heavy traffic. It's not a complete piece of cake for the Alpine though, as the Peugeot still has a superior speed advantage on the straight, and the Alpine pulls out of the battle and enters the pits on lap 72, a few seconds behind the #94 - taking new tyres while Negrao steps out of the car, handing the wheel to Lapierre.

Another bit of drama occurs as the #91 Porsche dived down the inside of the #88 Proton GTEAm Porsche at the 4h05m mark, spinning the latter out and carrying on, earning itself a 5s penalty for the net stop later on. Meanwhile, the Hypercars come in for their second stop, with the #93 being the first to come in followed by the #8, then the #7 and #94. Hartley replaced Buemi behind the wheel of the #8, Lopez took over from Kobayashi in the #7, Rossiter handed the car to Duval and Jensen took over from Vergne in the #93. The Toyotas remain ever dominant after the 2nd pit cycle - 50 seconds ahead of the Alpine, which is a further 1 minute ahead of the next Peugeot, bringing an end to the second hour of the race.

==== Hour 3 ====
The second LMP2 pit cycle was kicked off with the leader #28 comes into the pits around the 3h50m mark, after maintaining a gap of under a second to the #31 for nearly an hour, with the latter pitting a lap later, followed by the #38. Soon following would be the GTEAm pit cycles, with the leader #777 pitting first, followed by the #33 and #85 - Chaves takes over from Keating and Frey taking over from Bovy. The #33 and #31 would be the leaders in their respective classes after the cycle, with the former maintaining the lead all the way to the end.

The GTEPro pit cycle came at the 3h35m mark where the #52 came in first with Fuoco taking over, followed by the #51 with PierGuidi now in; where both Porsches would stay out until the next lap, #92 in first followed by the #91 as the #64 Corvette stays out for another few laps. The #51 and #52 would swap places after the cycle, both Ferraris still leading the class ahead of the two Porsches - the Corvette now basically out of the equation after the unfortunate penalty, running out of fuel in the pits, and the slow pace throughout the weekend; Tandy jokingly commenting "we suck!" in his interview a while later. (~3h09m mark)

Unreliability would strike again for Peugeot as smoke starts plummeting out of the rear of the #94 at the 3h 32m mark due to "an oil leakage in the low pressure circuit" causing a turbo issue, the car pitting and being sent into the garage, not leaving until a solid 20 minutes later in 2nd to last place, 24s behind the last place GTEAm and 14 laps down from the leading Toyota. Meanwhile, the LMP2 #83 would receive a 10s penalty for changing direction multiple times while battling with the #35 Ultimate, though the latter would also receive a 5s penalty for overtaking off track.

At the 3h25m mark the #10 Vector spun it at the second to last turn, rejoining into the middle of the track and accidentally sending the #85 off the track while taking evasive action, with the #98 closing right up on it and a battle for 4th starts to unfold.

The third LMH pit stops were again kicked off by Alpine on lap 109 around the 3h07 mark, with the LMP2 pit cycle happening simultaneously with the leading #31 being the first to stop. The next prototype to stop would be the #93, now a lap behind the #36; The Pro drivers in the #85 and #98 continue their close battle for 2nd in the GTEAm class.

==== Hour 4 ====
It's now the start of hour 4 and the #8 Toyota has entered the pits, followed by the #7; the two Toyotas being the last to pit this time. The order in LMH remains unchanged after the cycle compared to how it was before (ignoring the #94), the #8 ahead of the #7 ahead of the #36 and #93.

At the 2h53 mark the #86 GR racing had stopped at the middle of the last corner with a gearbox selector issue - the car was stuck in gear - bringing out a yellow flag; though the car was able to keep going and make its way into the pits.

A lead battle in GTEPro briefly unfolded on lap 121 as the Fuoco in the #52 starts to attack the #51 piloted by PierGuidi for the lead of the race - though it would back off again after a few laps, with the closest Porsche still around 20 seconds behind, Estre stating that Porsche doesn't work as well with the tyres as Ferrari does - plus that they're also losing on the straights. (~2h10m mark)

By the 4th GTEAm pit cycle came around, a #71 Spirit of Race Ferrari sneaked its way up the order - with Ragues carrying the car up to 3rd despite the few spins and a penalty for the team in the early stages.

Near the end of the 4th hour mark with a quarter of an hour to go, and after the pit cycles of LMP2 and GTEPro, the leading order in both classes remains relatively unchanged, with the #31 leading the #28 and the #9, and #51 leading #52 ahead of the Porsches. The gap between the leading #8 Toyota and the sister car #7 meanwhile has extended to a lengthy 27 seconds, though the latter is far from danger - the closest cars, #36 Alpine is still a lap down.

The reliability problem for Peugeot doesn't stop - as by the 2h03 mark, the #93 would find itself in the same situation as the #94 earlier, the car being also sent into the pits - though losing much less time - only 5 laps - fixing the issue. The #71, making its order up the field earlier, battled with the 2nd place #85 and was successful in taking the position, sending the car down the inside at the penultimate corner, and securing itself a 2nd-place position in class, bringing a close to the 4th hour.

==== Hour 5 ====
The 4th pit cycle for LMH is over, and now it's Hirakawa, Conway and Vaxivere in respectively the #8, #7 and #36. All 3 drivers would carry their cars to the finish. The #7 is now 39 seconds behind the #8 - the latter, according to Hartley (~1h51m mark), allegedly having better luck with its setup and the hot track, resulting in its quicker pace in the race.

Nearly halfway through the 5th hour saw the lead change between the Ferraris in GTEPro; the new leader #52 would go on to claim a 4-second lead in class near the end of the 5 hour mark.

At the 1h22m mark, a hard battling #22 and #1 duo in LMP2 came into contact, with the latter being the unfortunate one to get squeezed on the inside and spun. The #1 wouldn't be the only one to turn around, with DiResta clipping the inside dirt at turn 6 and spinning his #93 Peugeot, luckily without making any contact with the barriers.

The end of the penultimate hour saw what should be the final pit cycle for the GTEPro teams - with Ferraris pitting first as always, #52 first followed by #51, and then the #91 two laps later than the #52, followed by the #92 a lap later.

==== Hour 6 ====
The start of the final hour saw the #8, #7 and #93 entering the pits together - not the final stop for the LMHs as their stint length doesn't cover an hour's running. The more fortunate Peugeot #93 - especially so once the #94 had also gotten a 1m stop and go penalty for a "pit stop technical infringement" - made its way up to 8th place, behind the 4 leading LMP2s.

The final strategy battle for the leading LMP2s has started to play out in the final stops of the race - the #31 WRT opting to not go for a pit stop at the top of the hour to have a splash and dash at the final minutes of the race, where the #9 and championship contender #38 opted to go for their last stops at the 50 minute mark and go straight to the finish - Jota confident that "they can win this".

The No. 33 was the first leading GTE Am car to pit, while the No. 85 stopped last after completing three additional laps. The No. 85 took less fuel and received new tyres before Frey began pursuing the No. 33, driven by Sørensen, which held a 36-second lead. The strategy was unsuccessful, and the No. 85 finished one lap behind the No. 33.

With 4 minutes to go the #9 Prema would come into the pits - followed by the #38 Jota a minute later - the fuel saving strategy wouldn't work out for them, as the #31 goes past the #38 during its stop, establishing a 10-second lead and a certain victory, as their stop from around 40 minutes ago made sure that they have enough fuel to cross the line.

The #93 Peugeot would make it back to the rear of the LMH field, 4 laps behind the Alpine which is a further 2 laps behind the #7, with a one-minute deficit to the leading #8 as it enters the final lap. Toyota would dominate the weekend with their superior BoP and a very consistent performance throughout the race - the #8 in the hands of Hirakawa crossing the line in 1st with a 1m08s lead to its teammate, which struggled in terms of setup, losing out on pace. LMP2 was a show between WRT, Jota and Prema for the top spots - the #31 and #38 exchanging leads throughout the few pit cycles, with the latter two gambling it with a fuel strategy that wouldn't pay off - the #9 would drop to 6th by the chequered flag, while the #38, 21 seconds behind the winning #31, would occupy the remaining 2 podium spots with its #28 sister car. Porsche had no answer to the Ferraris' pace in GTEPro after getting overtaken in the first hours, the #92 eventually finishing half a minute behind the leading Ferrari duo. Corvette would be the unlucky team for the race, as their BoP hit following Monza and early issues in the race left them out of the fight, a lap down, together with the penalty affected #91 behind the podium sitters. Calado and PierGuidi would be the leaders for the GTEPro drivers' championship, with a 12pt gap to Estre and Christensen going into Bahrain. In GTEAm, the #33, superior on pace, would take the win with the #85 and #777 following on the podium.

=== Race results ===
The minimum number of laps for classification (70% of overall winning car's distance) was 162 laps. Class winners are in bold.

| Pos | Class | No | Team | Drivers | Chassis | Tyre | Laps | Time/Retired |
| Pos | Class | No | Team | Drivers | Engine | Tyre | Laps | Time/Retired |
|---|---|---|---|---|---|---|---|---|
| 1 | **Hypercar** | **8** | **(Japan) Toyota Gazoo Racing** | **(Switzerland) Sébastien Buemi (New Zealand) Brendon Hartley (Japan) Ryō Hirakawa** | **Toyota GR010 Hybrid** | M | **232** | **6:01:23.341** |
| 1 | **Hypercar** | **8** | **(Japan) Toyota Gazoo Racing** | **(Switzerland) Sébastien Buemi (New Zealand) Brendon Hartley (Japan) Ryō Hirakawa** | **Toyota H8909 3.5 L Turbo V6** | M | **232** | **6:01:23.341** |
| 2 | Hypercar | 7 | (Japan) Toyota Gazoo Racing | (United Kingdom) Mike Conway (Japan) Kamui Kobayashi (Argentina) José María López | Toyota GR010 Hybrid | M | 232 | +1:08.382 |
| 2 | Hypercar | 7 | (Japan) Toyota Gazoo Racing | (United Kingdom) Mike Conway (Japan) Kamui Kobayashi (Argentina) José María López | Toyota H8909 3.5 L Turbo V6 | M | 232 | +1:08.382 |
| 3 | Hypercar | 36 | (France) Alpine Elf Team | (Brazil) André Negrão (France) Nicolas Lapierre (France) Matthieu Vaxiviere | Alpine A480 | M | 230 | +2 laps |
| 3 | Hypercar | 36 | (France) Alpine Elf Team | (Brazil) André Negrão (France) Nicolas Lapierre (France) Matthieu Vaxiviere | Gibson GL458 4.5 L V8 | M | 230 | +2 laps |
| 4 | Hypercar | 93 | (France) Peugeot TotalEnergies | (United Kingdom) Paul di Resta (Denmark) Mikkel Jensen (France) Jean-Eric Vergne | Peugeot 9X8 | M | 225 | +7 laps |
| 4 | Hypercar | 93 | (France) Peugeot TotalEnergies | (United Kingdom) Paul di Resta (Denmark) Mikkel Jensen (France) Jean-Eric Vergne | Peugeot X6H 2.6 L Turbo V6 | M | 225 | +7 laps |
| 5 | **LMP2** | **31** | **(Belgium) WRT** | **(Indonesia) Sean Gelael (Netherlands) Robin Frijns (Belgium) Dries Vanthoor** | **Oreca 07** | G | **225** | **+7 laps** |
| 5 | **LMP2** | **31** | **(Belgium) WRT** | **(Indonesia) Sean Gelael (Netherlands) Robin Frijns (Belgium) Dries Vanthoor** | **Gibson GK428 4.2 L V8** | G | **225** | **+7 laps** |
| 6 | LMP2 | 38 | (United Kingdom) JOTA | (Mexico) Roberto Gonzalez Valdez (Portugal) Antonio Felix da Costa (United Kingdom) Will Stevens | Oreca 07 | G | 224 | +8 laps |
| 6 | LMP2 | 38 | (United Kingdom) JOTA | (Mexico) Roberto Gonzalez Valdez (Portugal) Antonio Felix da Costa (United Kingdom) Will Stevens | Gibson GK428 4.2 L V8 | G | 224 | +8 laps |
| 7 | LMP2 | 28 | (United Kingdom) JOTA | (Denmark) Oliver Rasmussen (United Kingdom) Edward Jones (South Africa) Jonathan Aberdein | Oreca 07 | G | 224 | +8 laps |
| 7 | LMP2 | 28 | (United Kingdom) JOTA | (Denmark) Oliver Rasmussen (United Kingdom) Edward Jones (South Africa) Jonathan Aberdein | Gibson GK428 4.2 L V8 | G | 224 | +8 laps |
| 8 | LMP2 | 41 | (Switzerland) RealTeam by WRT | (Portugal) Rui Andrade (Austria) Ferdinand Habsburg (France) Norman Nato | Oreca 07 | G | 224 | +8 laps |
| 8 | LMP2 | 41 | (Switzerland) RealTeam by WRT | (Portugal) Rui Andrade (Austria) Ferdinand Habsburg (France) Norman Nato | Gibson GK428 4.2 L V8 | G | 224 | +8 laps |
| 9 | LMP2 | 23 | (United States) United Autosports USA | (United Kingdom) Alexander Lynn (United Kingdom) Oliver Jarvis (United States) Josh Pierson | Oreca 07 | G | 224 | +8 laps |
| 9 | LMP2 | 23 | (United States) United Autosports USA | (United Kingdom) Alexander Lynn (United Kingdom) Oliver Jarvis (United States) Josh Pierson | Gibson GK428 4.2 L V8 | G | 224 | +8 laps |
| 10 | LMP2 | 9 | (Italy) Prema Orlen Team | (Poland) Robert Kubica (Switzerland) Louis Delétraz (Italy) Lorenzo Colombo | Oreca 07 | G | 224 | +8 laps |
| 10 | LMP2 | 9 | (Italy) Prema Orlen Team | (Poland) Robert Kubica (Switzerland) Louis Delétraz (Italy) Lorenzo Colombo | Gibson GK428 4.2 L V8 | G | 224 | +8 laps |
| 11 | LMP2 | 22 | (United States) United Autosports USA | (United Kingdom) Philip Hanson (Portugal) Filipe Albuquerque (United States) Will Owen | Oreca 07 | G | 224 | +8 laps |
| 11 | LMP2 | 22 | (United States) United Autosports USA | (United Kingdom) Philip Hanson (Portugal) Filipe Albuquerque (United States) Will Owen | Gibson GK428 4.2 L V8 | G | 224 | +8 laps |
| 12 | LMP2 | 1 | (France) Richard Mille Racing Team | (France) Lilou Wadoux (France) Paul-Loup Chatin (France) Charles Milesi | Oreca 07 | G | 223 | +9 laps |
| 12 | LMP2 | 1 | (France) Richard Mille Racing Team | (France) Lilou Wadoux (France) Paul-Loup Chatin (France) Charles Milesi | Gibson GK428 4.2 L V8 | G | 223 | +9 laps |
| 13 | LMP2 | 10 | (United Kingdom) Vector Sport | (Netherlands) Renger van der Zande (United Kingdom) Ryan Cullen (France) Sébastien Bourdais | Oreca 07 | G | 223 | +9 laps |
| 13 | LMP2 | 10 | (United Kingdom) Vector Sport | (Netherlands) Renger van der Zande (United Kingdom) Ryan Cullen (France) Sébastien Bourdais | Gibson GK428 4.2 L V8 | G | 223 | +9 laps |
| 14 | LMP2 | 83 | (Italy) AF Corse | (France) François Perrodo (Denmark) Nicklas Nielsen (Italy) Alessio Rovera | Oreca 07 | G | 223 | +9 laps |
| 14 | LMP2 | 83 | (Italy) AF Corse | (France) François Perrodo (Denmark) Nicklas Nielsen (Italy) Alessio Rovera | Gibson GK428 4.2 L V8 | G | 223 | +9 laps |
| 15 | LMP2 | 34 | (Poland) Inter Europol Competition | (Poland) Jakub Śmiechowski (United Kingdom) Alex Brundle (Mexico) Esteban Gutierrez | Oreca 07 | G | 222 | +10 laps |
| 15 | LMP2 | 34 | (Poland) Inter Europol Competition | (Poland) Jakub Śmiechowski (United Kingdom) Alex Brundle (Mexico) Esteban Gutierrez | Gibson GK428 4.2 L V8 | G | 222 | +10 laps |
| 16 | LMP2 | 35 | (France) Ultimate | (France) Jean-Baptiste Lahaye (France) Matthieu Lahaye (France) François Heriau | Oreca 07 | G | 221 | +11 laps |
| 16 | LMP2 | 35 | (France) Ultimate | (France) Jean-Baptiste Lahaye (France) Matthieu Lahaye (France) François Heriau | Gibson GK428 4.2 L V8 | G | 221 | +11 laps |
| 17 | **LMGTE Pro** | **51** | **(Italy) AF Corse** | **(Italy) Alessandro Pier Guidi (United Kingdom) James Calado** | **Ferrari 488 GTE Evo** | M | **217** | **+15 laps** |
| 17 | **LMGTE Pro** | **51** | **(Italy) AF Corse** | **(Italy) Alessandro Pier Guidi (United Kingdom) James Calado** | **Ferrari 3.9 L F154CB V8** | M | **217** | **+15 laps** |
| 18 | LMGTE Pro | 52 | (Italy) AF Corse | (Spain) Miguel Molina (Italy) Antonio Fuoco | Ferrari 488 GTE Evo | M | 217 | +15 laps |
| 18 | LMGTE Pro | 52 | (Italy) AF Corse | (Spain) Miguel Molina (Italy) Antonio Fuoco | Ferrari 3.9 L F154CB V8 | M | 217 | +15 laps |
| 19 | LMGTE Pro | 92 | (Germany) Porsche GT Team | (Denmark) Michael Christensen (France) Kévin Estre | Porsche 911 RSR-19 | M | 217 | +15 laps |
| 19 | LMGTE Pro | 92 | (Germany) Porsche GT Team | (Denmark) Michael Christensen (France) Kévin Estre | Porsche 4.2 L flat-6 | M | 217 | +15 laps |
| 20 | Hypercar | 94 | (France) Peugeot TotalEnergies | (France) Loïc Duval (United States) Gustavo Menezes (United Kingdom) James Rossiter | Peugeot 9X8 | M | 217 | +15 laps |
| 20 | Hypercar | 94 | (France) Peugeot TotalEnergies | (France) Loïc Duval (United States) Gustavo Menezes (United Kingdom) James Rossiter | Peugeot X6H 2.6 L Turbo V6 | M | 217 | +15 laps |
| 21 | LMGTE Pro | 91 | (Germany) Porsche GT Team | (Italy) Gianmaria Bruni (Austria) Richard Lietz | Porsche 911 RSR-19 | M | 216 | +16 laps |
| 21 | LMGTE Pro | 91 | (Germany) Porsche GT Team | (Italy) Gianmaria Bruni (Austria) Richard Lietz | Porsche 4.2 L flat-6 | M | 216 | +16 laps |
| 22 | LMGTE Pro | 64 | (United States) Corvette Racing | (United States) Tommy Milner (United Kingdom) Nick Tandy | Chevrolet Corvette C8.R | M | 215 | +17 laps |
| 22 | LMGTE Pro | 64 | (United States) Corvette Racing | (United States) Tommy Milner (United Kingdom) Nick Tandy | Chevrolet 5.5 L LT6 V8 | M | 215 | +17 laps |
| 23 | **LMGTE Am** | **33** | **(United Kingdom) TF Sport** | **(United States) Ben Keating (Portugal) Henrique Chaves (Denmark) Marco Sørensen** | **Aston Martin Vantage AMR** | M | **213** | **+19 Laps** |
| 23 | **LMGTE Am** | **33** | **(United Kingdom) TF Sport** | **(United States) Ben Keating (Portugal) Henrique Chaves (Denmark) Marco Sørensen** | **Mercedes-Benz 4.0 L M177 V8** | M | **213** | **+19 Laps** |
| 24 | LMGTE Am | 85 | (Italy) Iron Dames | (Switzerland) Rahel Frey (Denmark) Michelle Gatting (Belgium) Sarah Bovy | Ferrari 488 GTE Evo | M | 212 | +20 laps |
| 24 | LMGTE Am | 85 | (Italy) Iron Dames | (Switzerland) Rahel Frey (Denmark) Michelle Gatting (Belgium) Sarah Bovy | Ferrari 3.9 L F154CB V8 | M | 212 | +20 laps |
| 25 | LMGTE Am | 777 | (Japan) D'Station Racing | (Japan) Satoshi Hoshino (Japan) Tomonobu Fujii (United Kingdom) Charlie Fagg | Aston Martin Vantage AMR | M | 212 | +20 laps |
| 25 | LMGTE Am | 777 | (Japan) D'Station Racing | (Japan) Satoshi Hoshino (Japan) Tomonobu Fujii (United Kingdom) Charlie Fagg | Mercedes-Benz 4.0 L M177 V8 | M | 212 | +20 laps |
| 26 | LMGTE Am | 54 | (Italy) AF Corse | (Switzerland) Thomas Flohr (Italy) Francesco Castellacci (Italy) Davide Rigon | Ferrari 488 GTE Evo | M | 212 | +20 laps |
| 26 | LMGTE Am | 54 | (Italy) AF Corse | (Switzerland) Thomas Flohr (Italy) Francesco Castellacci (Italy) Davide Rigon | Ferrari 3.9 L F154CB V8 | M | 212 | +20 laps |
| 27 | LMGTE Am | 98 | (Canada) Northwest AMR | (Canada) Paul Dalla Lana (United Kingdom) David Pittard (Denmark) Nicki Thiim | Aston Martin Vantage AMR | M | 212 | +20 laps |
| 27 | LMGTE Am | 98 | (Canada) Northwest AMR | (Canada) Paul Dalla Lana (United Kingdom) David Pittard (Denmark) Nicki Thiim | Mercedes-Benz 4.0 L M177 V8 | M | 212 | +20 laps |
| 28 | LMGTE Am | 46 | (Germany) Team Project 1 | (Italy) Matteo Cairoli (Denmark) Mikkel Pedersen (Switzerland) Nicolas Leutwiler | Porsche 911 RSR-19 | M | 211 | +21 laps |
| 28 | LMGTE Am | 46 | (Germany) Team Project 1 | (Italy) Matteo Cairoli (Denmark) Mikkel Pedersen (Switzerland) Nicolas Leutwiler | Porsche 4.2L L flat-6 | M | 211 | +21 laps |
| 29 | LMGTE Am | 71 | (Switzerland) Spirit of Race | (France) Franck Dezoteux (France) Pierre Ragues (France) Gabriel Aubry | Ferrari 488 GTE Evo | M | 211 | +21 laps |
| 29 | LMGTE Am | 71 | (Switzerland) Spirit of Race | (France) Franck Dezoteux (France) Pierre Ragues (France) Gabriel Aubry | Ferrari 3.9 L F154CB V8 | M | 211 | +21 laps |
| 30 | LMGTE Am | 56 | (Germany) Team Project 1 | (Japan) Takeshi Kimura (United Kingdom) Oliver Millroy (United Kingdom) Ben Barnicoat | Porsche 911 RSR-19 | M | 211 | +21 laps |
| 30 | LMGTE Am | 56 | (Germany) Team Project 1 | (Japan) Takeshi Kimura (United Kingdom) Oliver Millroy (United Kingdom) Ben Barnicoat | Porsche 4.2 L flat-6 | M | 211 | +21 laps |
| 31 | LMGTE Am | 88 | (Germany) Dempsey-Proton Racing | (United States) Fred Poordad (United States) Patrick Lindsey (Belgium) Jan Heylen | Porsche 911 RSR-19 | M | 211 | +21 laps |
| 31 | LMGTE Am | 88 | (Germany) Dempsey-Proton Racing | (United States) Fred Poordad (United States) Patrick Lindsey (Belgium) Jan Heylen | Porsche 4.2 L flat-6 | M | 211 | +21 laps |
| 32 | LMGTE Am | 21 | (Italy) AF Corse | (United States) Simon Mann (Switzerland) Christoph Ulrich (Finland) Toni Vilander | Ferrari 488 GTE Evo | M | 211 | +21 laps |
| 32 | LMGTE Am | 21 | (Italy) AF Corse | (United States) Simon Mann (Switzerland) Christoph Ulrich (Finland) Toni Vilander | Ferrari 3.9 L F154CB V8 | M | 211 | +21 laps |
| 33 | LMGTE Am | 60 | (Italy) Iron Lynx | (Italy) Claudio Schiavoni (Italy) Matteo Cressoni (Italy) Giancarlo Fisichella | Ferrari 488 GTE Evo | M | 211 | +21 laps |
| 33 | LMGTE Am | 60 | (Italy) Iron Lynx | (Italy) Claudio Schiavoni (Italy) Matteo Cressoni (Italy) Giancarlo Fisichella | Ferrari 3.9 L F154CB V8 | M | 211 | +21 laps |
| 34 | LMP2 | 45 | (Portugal) Algarve Pro Racing | (United States) Steven Thomas (Australia) James Allen (Austria) René Binder | Oreca 07 | G | 199 | +33 laps |
| 34 | LMP2 | 45 | (Portugal) Algarve Pro Racing | (United States) Steven Thomas (Australia) James Allen (Austria) René Binder | Gibson GK428 4.2 L V8 | G | 199 | +33 laps |
| 35 | LMGTE Am | 86 | (United Kingdom) GR Racing | (United Kingdom) Michael Wainwright (Italy) Riccardo Pera (United Kingdom) Ben Barker | Porsche 911 RSR-19 | M | 193 | +39 laps |
| 35 | LMGTE Am | 86 | (United Kingdom) GR Racing | (United Kingdom) Michael Wainwright (Italy) Riccardo Pera (United Kingdom) Ben Barker | Porsche 4.2 L flat-6 | M | 193 | +39 laps |
| Ret | LMGTE Am | 77 | (Germany) Dempsey-Proton Racing | (Germany) Christian Ried (United Kingdom) Sebastian Priaulx (United Kingdom) Harry Tincknell | Porsche 911 RSR-19 | M | 128 | Driveshaft |
| Ret | LMGTE Am | 77 | (Germany) Dempsey-Proton Racing | (Germany) Christian Ried (United Kingdom) Sebastian Priaulx (United Kingdom) Harry Tincknell | Porsche 4.2 L flat-6 | M | 128 | Driveshaft |

== Championship standings ==
2022 Hypercar World Endurance Drivers' Championship

| Pos | +/- | Driver | Points |
|---|---|---|---|
| 1 | | (New Zealand) Brendon Hartley (Japan) Ryo Hirakawa (Switzerland) Sebastien Buemi | 121 |
| 2 | | (Brazil) André Negrão (France) Matthieu Vaxivière (France) Nicolas Lapierre | 121 |
| 3 | | (Argentina) José María López (Japan) Kamui Kobayashi (United Kingdom) Mike Conway | 95 |
| 4 | | (France) Olivier Pla (France) Romain Dumas | 70 |
| 5 | | (Brazil) Pipo Derani | 47 |

2022 Hypercar World Endurance Manufacturers' World Championship

| Pos | +/- | Manufacturer | Points |
|---|---|---|---|
| 1 | | (Japan) Toyota | 147 |
| 2 | | (France) Alpine | 121 |
| 3 | | (United States) Glickenhaus | 70 |
| 4 | | (France) Peugeot | 24 |

2022 World Endurance GTE Drivers' Championship

| Pos | +/- | Driver | Points |
|---|---|---|---|
| 1 | | (Italy) Alessandro Pier Guidi (United Kingdom) James Calado | 120 |
| 2 | | (France) Kevin Estre (Denmark) Michael Christensen | 109 |
| 3 | | (Italy) Gianmaria Bruni | 106 |
| 4 | | (Austria) Richard Lietz | 96 |
| 5 | | (Italy) Antonio Fuoco (Spain) Miguel Molina | 93 |

2022 World Endurance GTE Manufacturers' Championship

| Pos | +/- | Team | Points |
|---|---|---|---|
| 1 | | (Italy) Ferrari | 216 |
| 2 | | (Germany) Porsche | 215 |
| 3 | | (United States) Chevrolet | 75 |
