= 2022 FIA World Endurance Championship =

Auto racing series

- Organizer: Fédération Internationale de l'Automobile; Automobile Club de l'Ouest
- Discipline: Sports car endurance racing
- Races: 6

Champions
- Hypercar Manufacturer: (Japan) Toyota
- GTE Manufacturer: (Italy) Ferrari
- LMP2 Team: (United Kingdom) Jota
- LMP2 Pro-Am Team: (Italy) AF Corse
- LMGTE Am Team: (United Kingdom) TF Sport

FIA World Endurance Championship
- ← 2021 2023 →

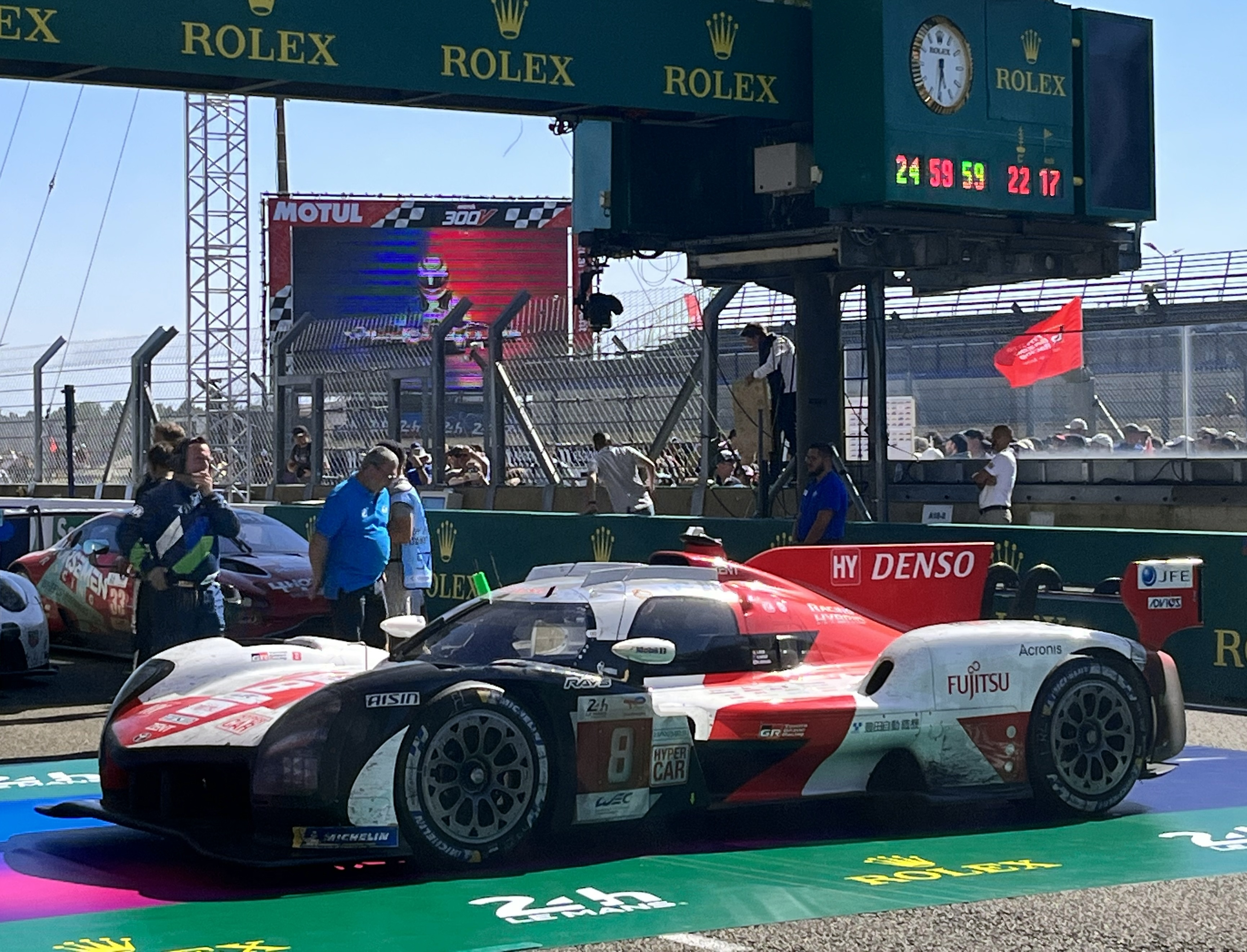
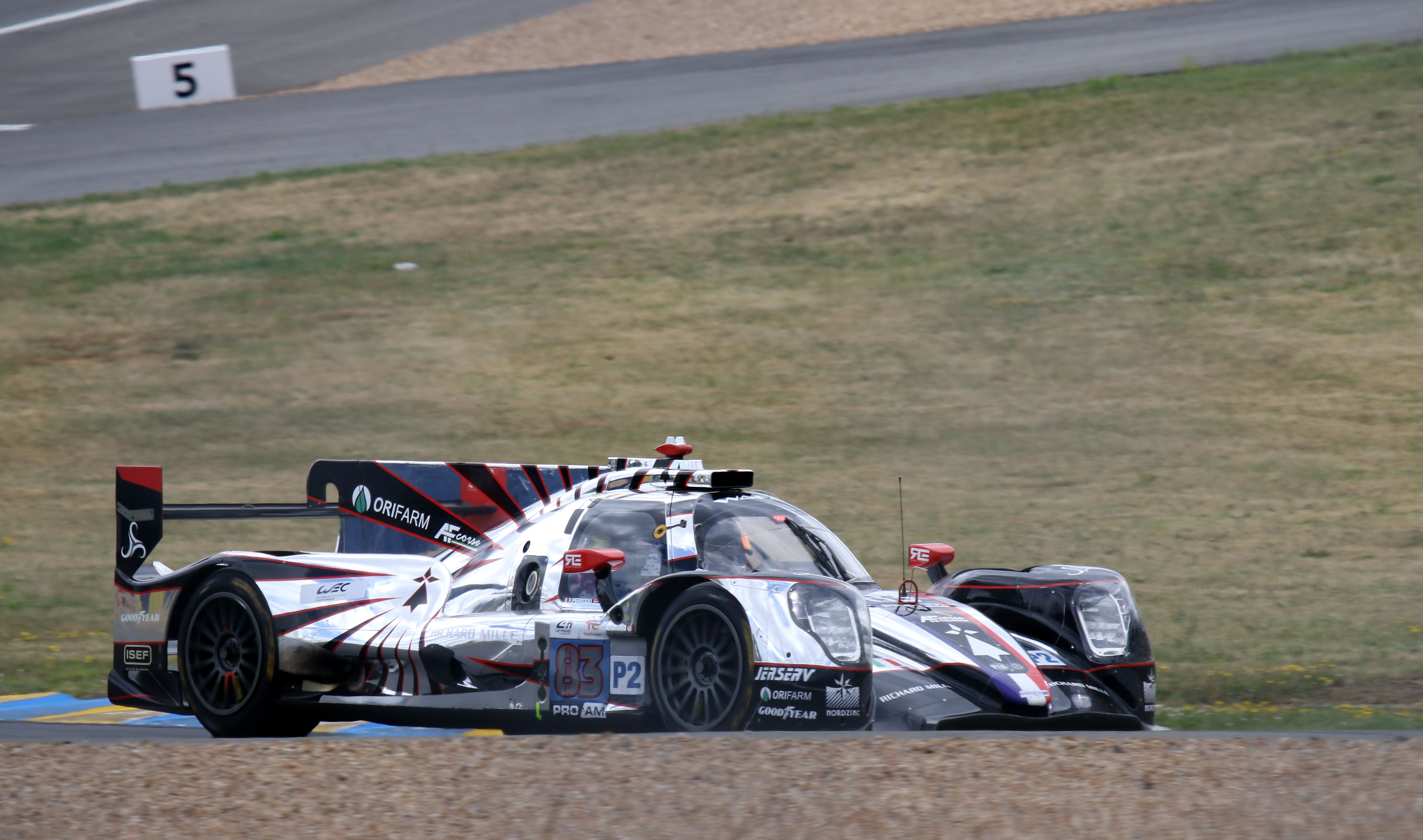
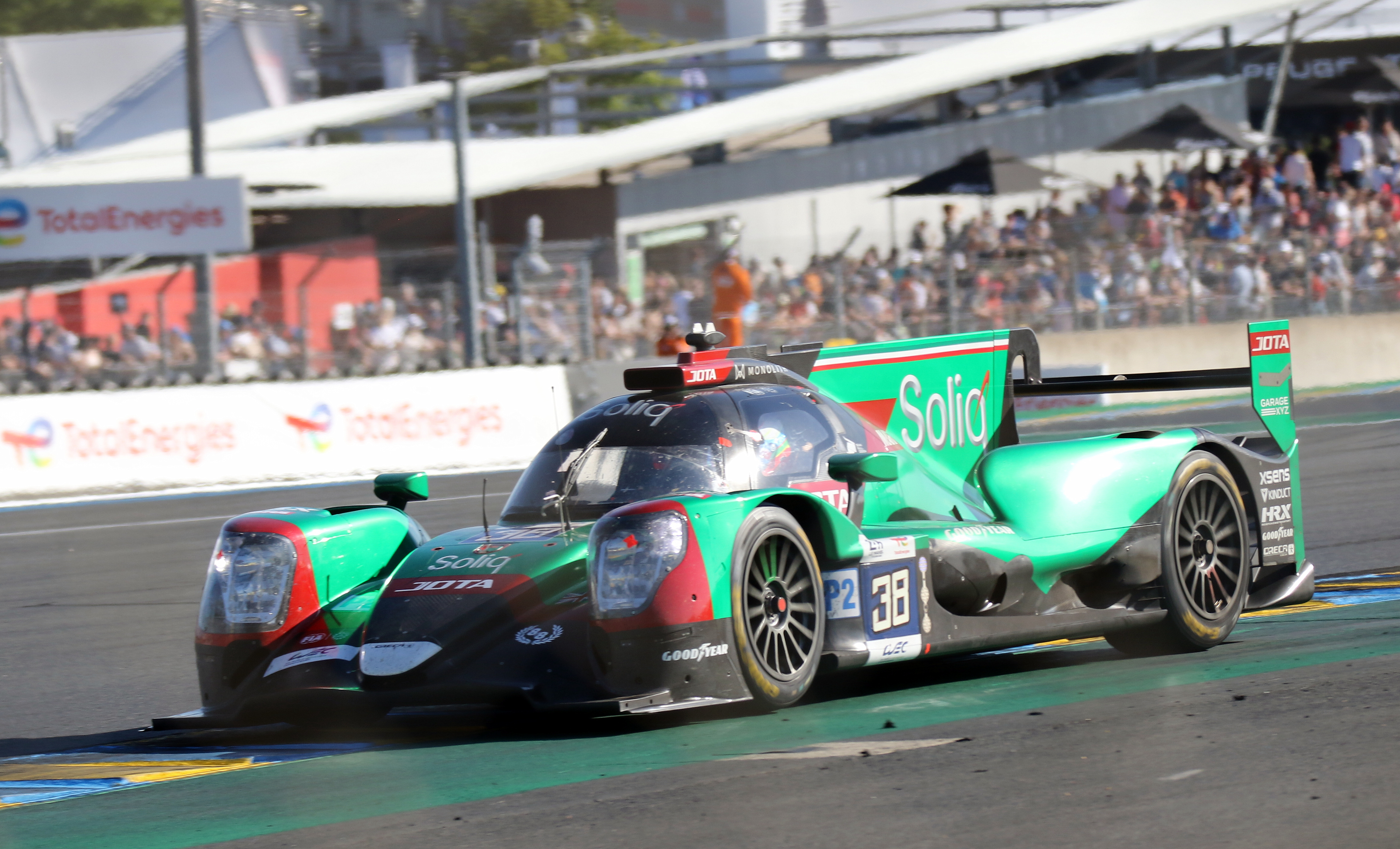
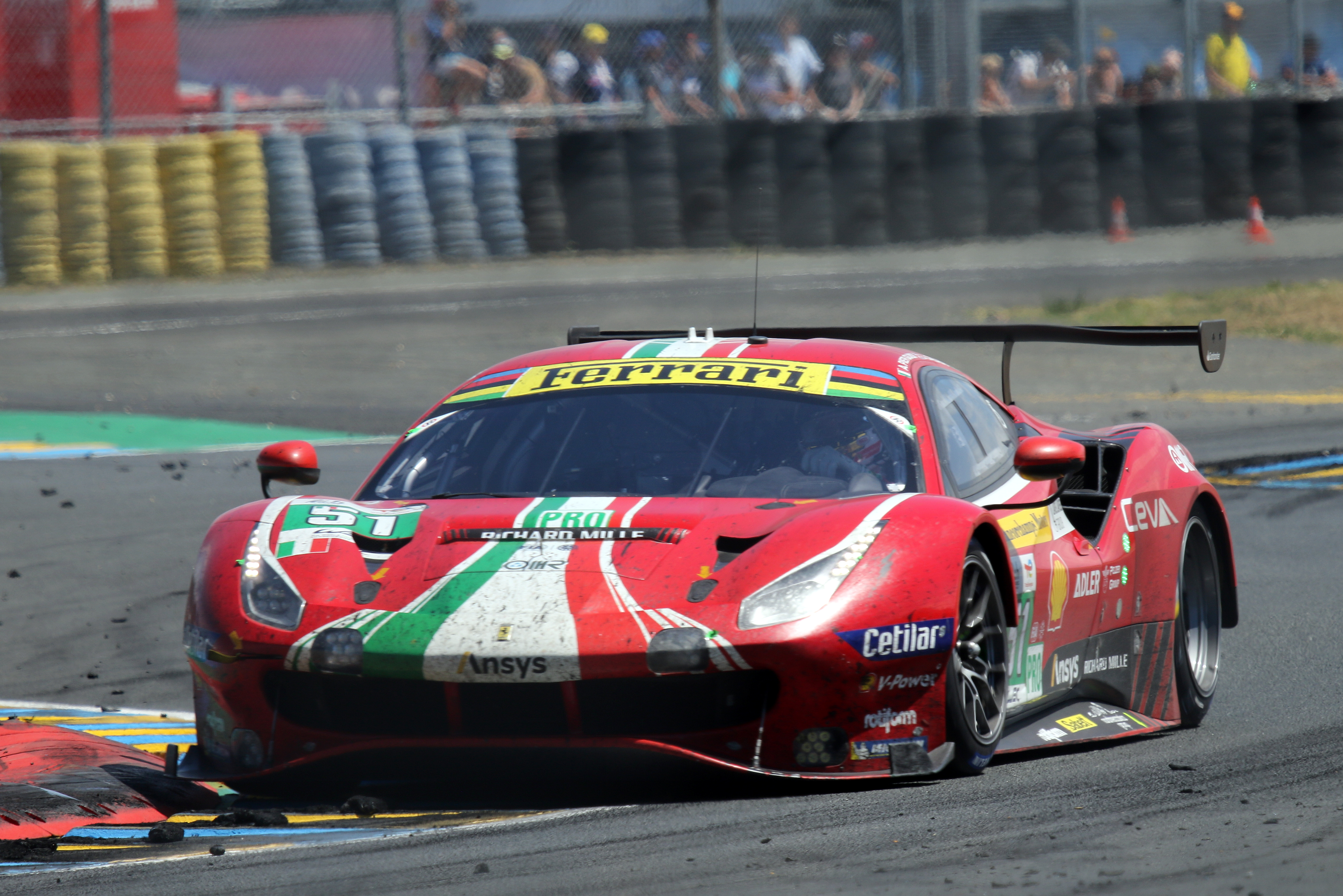
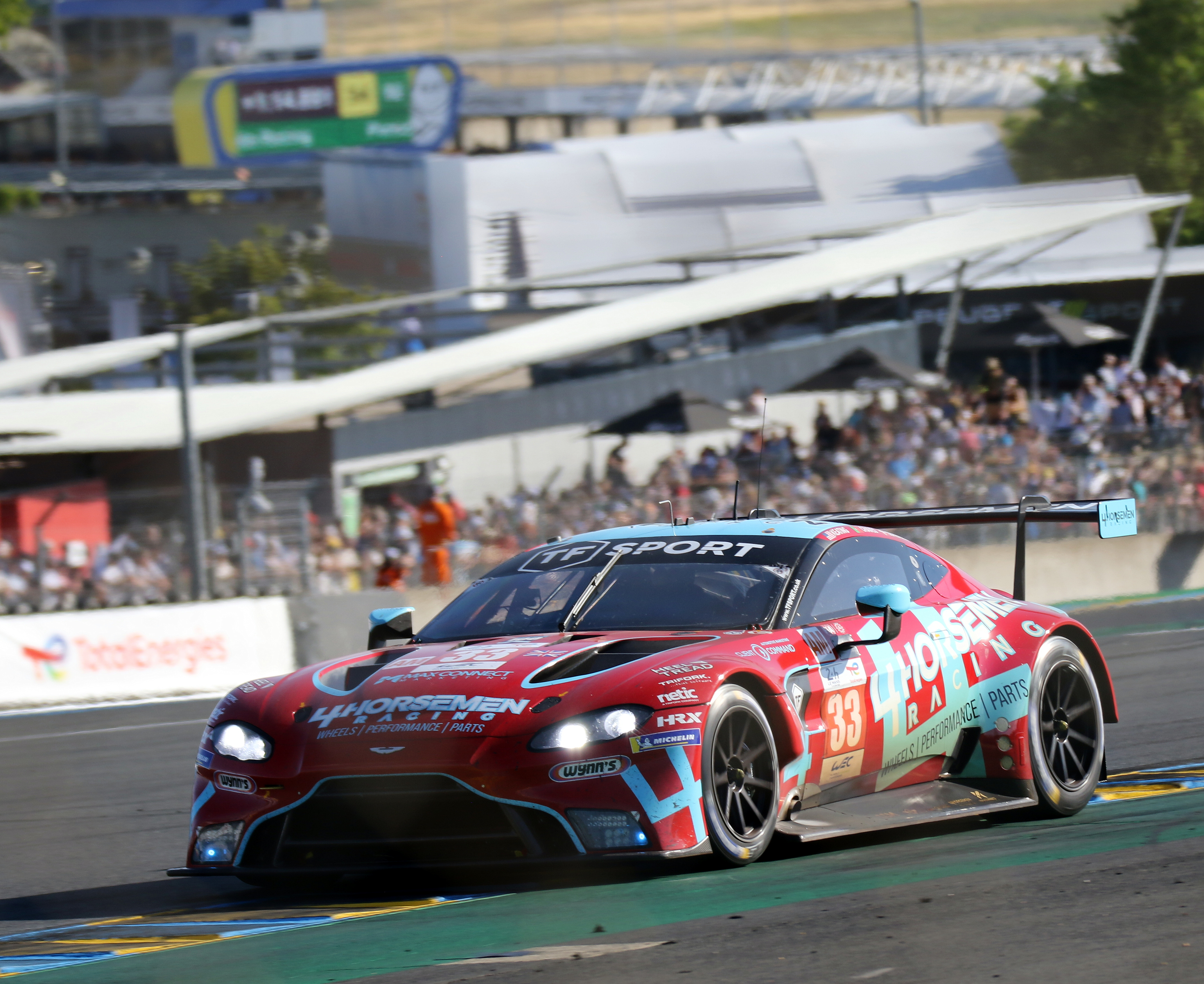
The No. 8 Toyota Gazoo Racing won the Hypercar Drivers' Championship with Toyota winning the Hypercar Manufacturers' championship. The No. 83 AF Corse won the Endurance Trophy for LMP2 Pro/Am Drivers and Teams'. The No. 38 Jota won the Endurance Trophy for LMP2 Drivers and Teams' championships. The No. 51 AF Corse won the GTE Drivers' Championship, with Ferrari winning the GTE Constructors' Championship. The No. 33 TF Sport won the Endurance Trophy for GTE Am Drivers and Teams'.

The 2022 FIA World Endurance Championship was the tenth season of the FIA World Endurance Championship, an auto racing series organised by the Fédération Internationale de l'Automobile (FIA) and the Automobile Club de l'Ouest (ACO). The series was open to prototype and grand tourer-style racing cars divided into four categories. World Championship titles were awarded to the leading manufacturers and drivers in both the prototype and grand tourer divisions.

It was the first season in which LMDh (Le Mans Daytona h) entries were allowed to compete alongside LMH (Le Mans Hypercar) entries on a race-by-race basis. However, they were not eligible for championship points until 2023. It was the last season for LMGTE Pro class.

== Calendar ==
The provisional calendar was announced in August 2021, featuring six rounds. Sebring and Fuji returned to the schedule after being canceled in 2021, while the second Bahrain and Portimão events were removed from the schedule. The 24 Hours of Le Mans also returned to its traditional early summer date.

Rnd	Race	Circuit	Location	Date
	Prologue	Sebring International Raceway	(United States) Sebring, Florida	12/13 March
1	1000 Miles of Sebring	Sebring International Raceway	(United States) Sebring, Florida	18 March
2	TotalEnergies 6 Hours of Spa-Francorchamps	Circuit de Spa-Francorchamps	(Belgium) Stavelot	7 May
3	90th 24 Hours of Le Mans	Circuit de la Sarthe	(France) Le Mans	11–12 June
4	6 Hours of Monza	Autodromo Nazionale di Monza	(Italy) Monza	10 July
5	6 Hours of Fuji	Fuji Speedway	(Japan) Oyama, Shizuoka	11 September
6	8 Hours of Bahrain	Bahrain International Circuit	(Bahrain) Sakhir	12 November

== Entries ==
=== Hypercar ===
Entrant	Car	Engine	Hybrid	Tyre	No.	Drivers	Rounds
(Japan) Toyota Gazoo Racing	Toyota GR010 Hybrid	Toyota H8909 3.5 L Turbo V6	Hybrid	M	7	(United Kingdom) Mike Conway	All
(Japan) Toyota Gazoo Racing	Toyota GR010 Hybrid	Toyota H8909 3.5 L Turbo V6	Hybrid	M	7	(Japan) Kamui Kobayashi	All
(Japan) Toyota Gazoo Racing	Toyota GR010 Hybrid	Toyota H8909 3.5 L Turbo V6	Hybrid	M	7	(Argentina) José María López	All
(Japan) Toyota Gazoo Racing	Toyota GR010 Hybrid	Toyota H8909 3.5 L Turbo V6	Hybrid	M	8	(Switzerland) Sébastien Buemi	All
(Japan) Toyota Gazoo Racing	Toyota GR010 Hybrid	Toyota H8909 3.5 L Turbo V6	Hybrid	M	8	(New Zealand) Brendon Hartley	All
(Japan) Toyota Gazoo Racing	Toyota GR010 Hybrid	Toyota H8909 3.5 L Turbo V6	Hybrid	M	8	(Japan) Ryō Hirakawa	All
(France) Alpine Elf Team	Alpine A480	Gibson GL458 4.5 L V8		M	36	(France) Nicolas Lapierre	All
(France) Alpine Elf Team	Alpine A480	Gibson GL458 4.5 L V8		M	36	(Brazil) André Negrão	All
(France) Alpine Elf Team	Alpine A480	Gibson GL458 4.5 L V8		M	36	(France) Matthieu Vaxivière	All
(France) Peugeot TotalEnergies	Peugeot 9X8	Peugeot X6H 2.6 L Turbo V6	Hybrid	M	93	(United Kingdom) Paul di Resta	4–6
(France) Peugeot TotalEnergies	Peugeot 9X8	Peugeot X6H 2.6 L Turbo V6	Hybrid	M	93	(Denmark) Mikkel Jensen	4–6
(France) Peugeot TotalEnergies	Peugeot 9X8	Peugeot X6H 2.6 L Turbo V6	Hybrid	M	93	(France) Jean-Éric Vergne	4–6
(France) Peugeot TotalEnergies	Peugeot 9X8	Peugeot X6H 2.6 L Turbo V6	Hybrid	M	94	(France) Loïc Duval	4–6
(France) Peugeot TotalEnergies	Peugeot 9X8	Peugeot X6H 2.6 L Turbo V6	Hybrid	M	94	(United States) Gustavo Menezes	4–6
(France) Peugeot TotalEnergies	Peugeot 9X8	Peugeot X6H 2.6 L Turbo V6	Hybrid	M	94	(United Kingdom) James Rossiter	4–5
(France) Peugeot TotalEnergies	Peugeot 9X8	Peugeot X6H 2.6 L Turbo V6	Hybrid	M	94	(Switzerland) Nico Müller	6
(United States) Glickenhaus Racing	Glickenhaus SCG 007 LMH	Glickenhaus P21 3.5 L Turbo V8		M	708	(France) Romain Dumas	1–4
(United States) Glickenhaus Racing	Glickenhaus SCG 007 LMH	Glickenhaus P21 3.5 L Turbo V8		M	708	(France) Olivier Pla	1–4
(United States) Glickenhaus Racing	Glickenhaus SCG 007 LMH	Glickenhaus P21 3.5 L Turbo V8		M	708	(Australia) Ryan Briscoe	1
(United States) Glickenhaus Racing	Glickenhaus SCG 007 LMH	Glickenhaus P21 3.5 L Turbo V8		M	708	(Brazil) Pipo Derani	2–4

- Kevin Magnussen was scheduled to compete for Peugeot TotalEnergies, but withdrew before the season to rejoin Haas in Formula One. He was replaced with reserve driver James Rossiter.

=== LMP2 ===
In accordance with the 2017 LMP2 regulations, all cars in the LMP2 class used the Gibson GK428 V8 engine. Entries in the LMP2 Pro-Am Cup, set aside for teams with a Bronze-rated driver in their line-up, are denoted with Icons.

Entrant	Car	Tyre	MISC	No.	Drivers	Rounds
(France) Richard Mille Racing Team	Oreca 07	G	P2	1	(France) Charles Milesi	All
(France) Richard Mille Racing Team	Oreca 07	G	P2	1	(France) Lilou Wadoux	All
(France) Richard Mille Racing Team	Oreca 07	G	P2	1	(France) Sébastien Ogier	1–3
(France) Richard Mille Racing Team	Oreca 07	G	P2	1	(France) Paul-Loup Chatin	4–6
(United States) Team Penske	Oreca 07	G	P2	5	(United States) Dane Cameron	1–3
(United States) Team Penske	Oreca 07	G	P2	5	(France) Emmanuel Collard	1–3
(United States) Team Penske	Oreca 07	G	P2	5	(Brazil) Felipe Nasr	1–3
(Italy) Prema Orlen Team	Oreca 07	G	P2	9	(Italy) Lorenzo Colombo	All
(Italy) Prema Orlen Team	Oreca 07	G	P2	9	(Switzerland) Louis Delétraz	All
(Italy) Prema Orlen Team	Oreca 07	G	P2	9	(Poland) Robert Kubica	All
(United Kingdom) Vector Sport	Oreca 07	G	P2	10	(Republic of Ireland) Ryan Cullen	All
(United Kingdom) Vector Sport	Oreca 07	G	P2	10	(Switzerland) Nico Müller	1–4
(United Kingdom) Vector Sport	Oreca 07	G	P2	10	(Netherlands) Renger van der Zande	5–6
(United Kingdom) Vector Sport	Oreca 07	G	P2	10	(Germany) Mike Rockenfeller	1
(United Kingdom) Vector Sport	Oreca 07	G	P2	10	(France) Sébastien Bourdais	2–6
(United States) United Autosports USA	Oreca 07	G	P2	22	(Portugal) Filipe Albuquerque	All
(United States) United Autosports USA	Oreca 07	G	P2	22	(United Kingdom) Phil Hanson	All
(United States) United Autosports USA	Oreca 07	G	P2	22	(United States) Will Owen	All
(United States) United Autosports USA	Oreca 07	G	P2	23	(United Kingdom) Oliver Jarvis	All
(United States) United Autosports USA	Oreca 07	G	P2	23	(United States) Josh Pierson	All
(United States) United Autosports USA	Oreca 07	G	P2	23	(United Kingdom) Paul di Resta	1
(United States) United Autosports USA	Oreca 07	G	P2	23	(United Kingdom) Alex Lynn	2–6
(United Kingdom) Jota	Oreca 07	G	P2	28	(South Africa) Jonathan Aberdein	All
(United Kingdom) Jota	Oreca 07	G	P2	28	(United Arab Emirates) Ed Jones	All
(United Kingdom) Jota	Oreca 07	G	P2	28	(Denmark) Oliver Rasmussen	All
(United Kingdom) Jota	Oreca 07	G	P2	38	(Portugal) António Félix da Costa	All
(United Kingdom) Jota	Oreca 07	G	P2	38	(Mexico) Roberto González	All
(United Kingdom) Jota	Oreca 07	G	P2	38	(United Kingdom) Will Stevens	All
(Belgium) WRT	Oreca 07	G	P2	31	(Netherlands) Robin Frijns	All
(Belgium) WRT	Oreca 07	G	P2	31	(Indonesia) Sean Gelael	All
(Belgium) WRT	Oreca 07	G	P2	31	(Germany) René Rast	1–4, 6
(Belgium) WRT	Oreca 07	G	P2	31	(Belgium) Dries Vanthoor	5
(Switzerland) RealTeam by WRT	Oreca 07	G	P2	41	(Portugal) Rui Andrade	All
(Switzerland) RealTeam by WRT	Oreca 07	G	P2	41	(Austria) Ferdinand Habsburg	All
(Switzerland) RealTeam by WRT	Oreca 07	G	P2	41	(France) Norman Nato	All
(Poland) Inter Europol Competition	Oreca 07	G	P2	34	(Mexico) Esteban Gutiérrez	All
(Poland) Inter Europol Competition	Oreca 07	G	P2	34	(Poland) Jakub Śmiechowski	All
(Poland) Inter Europol Competition	Oreca 07	G	P2	34	(Switzerland) Fabio Scherer	1
(Poland) Inter Europol Competition	Oreca 07	G	P2	34	(United Kingdom) Alex Brundle	2–6
(France) Ultimate	Oreca 07	G	PA	35	(France) François Hériau	All
(France) Ultimate	Oreca 07	G	PA	35	(France) Jean-Baptiste Lahaye	All
(France) Ultimate	Oreca 07	G	PA	35	(France) Matthieu Lahaye	All
(Slovakia) ARC Bratislava	Oreca 07	G	PA	44	(Slovakia) Miro Konôpka	1–4, 6
(Slovakia) ARC Bratislava	Oreca 07	G	PA	44	(Switzerland) Mathias Beche	1, 4, 6
(Slovakia) ARC Bratislava	Oreca 07	G	PA	44	(Netherlands) Bent Viscaal	2–3
(Slovakia) ARC Bratislava	Oreca 07	G	PA	44	(Netherlands) Tijmen van der Helm	1–2, 4
(Slovakia) ARC Bratislava	Oreca 07	G	PA	44	(France) Tristan Vautier	3
(Slovakia) ARC Bratislava	Oreca 07	G	PA	44	(United Kingdom) Richard Bradley	6
(Portugal) Algarve Pro Racing (Note: G-Drive Racing was scheduled to field an LMP2 entry, but the team and driver Daniil Kvyat refused to accept the FIA's code of conduct regarding the participation of Russian competitors after the 2022 Russian invasion of Ukraine, and withdrew on 6 March. Algarve Pro Racing, who operated the G-Drive program, took over the entry independently on a race-by-race basis.)	Oreca 07	G	PA	45	(Australia) James Allen	All
(Portugal) Algarve Pro Racing	Oreca 07	G	PA	45	(Austria) René Binder	All
(Portugal) Algarve Pro Racing	Oreca 07	G	PA	45	(United States) Steven Thomas	All
(Italy) AF Corse	Oreca 07	G	PA	83	(Denmark) Nicklas Nielsen	All
(Italy) AF Corse	Oreca 07	G	PA	83	(France) François Perrodo	All
(Italy) AF Corse	Oreca 07	G	PA	83	(Italy) Alessio Rovera	All

Icon	MISC
P2	LMP2
PA	LMP2 Pro-Am Cup

=== LMGTE Pro ===
Entrant	Car	Engine	Tyre	No.	Drivers	Rounds
(Italy) AF Corse	Ferrari 488 GTE Evo	Ferrari F154CB 4.0 L Turbo V8	M	51	(United Kingdom) James Calado	All
(Italy) AF Corse	Ferrari 488 GTE Evo	Ferrari F154CB 4.0 L Turbo V8	M	51	(Italy) Alessandro Pier Guidi	All
(Italy) AF Corse	Ferrari 488 GTE Evo	Ferrari F154CB 4.0 L Turbo V8	M	51	(Brazil) Daniel Serra	3
(Italy) AF Corse	Ferrari 488 GTE Evo	Ferrari F154CB 4.0 L Turbo V8	M	52	(Italy) Antonio Fuoco	All
(Italy) AF Corse	Ferrari 488 GTE Evo	Ferrari F154CB 4.0 L Turbo V8	M	52	(Spain) Miguel Molina	All
(Italy) AF Corse	Ferrari 488 GTE Evo	Ferrari F154CB 4.0 L Turbo V8	M	52	(Italy) Davide Rigon	3
(United States) Corvette Racing	Chevrolet Corvette C8.R	Chevrolet LT6.R 5.5 L V8	M	64	(United States) Tommy Milner	All
(United States) Corvette Racing	Chevrolet Corvette C8.R	Chevrolet LT6.R 5.5 L V8	M	64	(United Kingdom) Nick Tandy	All
(United States) Corvette Racing	Chevrolet Corvette C8.R	Chevrolet LT6.R 5.5 L V8	M	64	(United Kingdom) Alexander Sims	3
(Germany) Porsche GT Team	Porsche 911 RSR-19	Porsche M97/80 4.2 L Flat-6	M	91	(Italy) Gianmaria Bruni	All
(Germany) Porsche GT Team	Porsche 911 RSR-19	Porsche M97/80 4.2 L Flat-6	M	91	(Austria) Richard Lietz	1–3, 5–6
(Germany) Porsche GT Team	Porsche 911 RSR-19	Porsche M97/80 4.2 L Flat-6	M	91	(France) Frédéric Makowiecki	3–4
(Germany) Porsche GT Team	Porsche 911 RSR-19	Porsche M97/80 4.2 L Flat-6	M	92	(Denmark) Michael Christensen	All
(Germany) Porsche GT Team	Porsche 911 RSR-19	Porsche M97/80 4.2 L Flat-6	M	92	(France) Kévin Estre	All
(Germany) Porsche GT Team	Porsche 911 RSR-19	Porsche M97/80 4.2 L Flat-6	M	92	(Belgium) Laurens Vanthoor	3

=== LMGTE Am ===
Entrant	Car	Engine	Tyre	No.	Drivers	Rounds
(Italy) AF Corse	Ferrari 488 GTE Evo	Ferrari F154CB 4.0 L Turbo V8	M	21	(United States) Simon Mann	All
(Italy) AF Corse	Ferrari 488 GTE Evo	Ferrari F154CB 4.0 L Turbo V8	M	21	(Switzerland) Christoph Ulrich	All
(Italy) AF Corse	Ferrari 488 GTE Evo	Ferrari F154CB 4.0 L Turbo V8	M	21	(Finland) Toni Vilander	All
(Italy) AF Corse	Ferrari 488 GTE Evo	Ferrari F154CB 4.0 L Turbo V8	M	54	(Italy) Francesco Castellacci	All
(Italy) AF Corse	Ferrari 488 GTE Evo	Ferrari F154CB 4.0 L Turbo V8	M	54	(Switzerland) Thomas Flohr	All
(Italy) AF Corse	Ferrari 488 GTE Evo	Ferrari F154CB 4.0 L Turbo V8	M	54	(New Zealand) Nick Cassidy	1–4, 6
(Italy) AF Corse	Ferrari 488 GTE Evo	Ferrari F154CB 4.0 L Turbo V8	M	54	(Italy) Davide Rigon	5
(Switzerland) Spirit of Race	Ferrari 488 GTE Evo	Ferrari F154CB 4.0 L Turbo V8	M	71	(France) Gabriel Aubry	All
(Switzerland) Spirit of Race	Ferrari 488 GTE Evo	Ferrari F154CB 4.0 L Turbo V8	M	71	(France) Franck Dezoteux	All
(Switzerland) Spirit of Race	Ferrari 488 GTE Evo	Ferrari F154CB 4.0 L Turbo V8	M	71	(France) Pierre Ragues	All
(United Kingdom) TF Sport	Aston Martin Vantage AMR	Aston Martin M177 4.0 L Turbo V8	M	33	(United States) Ben Keating	All
(United Kingdom) TF Sport	Aston Martin Vantage AMR	Aston Martin M177 4.0 L Turbo V8	M	33	(Denmark) Marco Sørensen	All
(United Kingdom) TF Sport	Aston Martin Vantage AMR	Aston Martin M177 4.0 L Turbo V8	M	33	(France) Florian Latorre	1
(United Kingdom) TF Sport	Aston Martin Vantage AMR	Aston Martin M177 4.0 L Turbo V8	M	33	(Portugal) Henrique Chaves	2–6
(Japan) D'station Racing	Aston Martin Vantage AMR	Aston Martin M177 4.0 L Turbo V8	M	777	(United Kingdom) Charlie Fagg	All
(Japan) D'station Racing	Aston Martin Vantage AMR	Aston Martin M177 4.0 L Turbo V8	M	777	(Japan) Tomonobu Fujii	All
(Japan) D'station Racing	Aston Martin Vantage AMR	Aston Martin M177 4.0 L Turbo V8	M	777	(Japan) Satoshi Hoshino	All
(Germany) Team Project 1	Porsche 911 RSR-19	Porsche M97/80 4.2 L Flat-6	M	46	(Italy) Matteo Cairoli	All
(Germany) Team Project 1	Porsche 911 RSR-19	Porsche M97/80 4.2 L Flat-6	M	46	(Switzerland) Nicolas Leutwiler	All
(Germany) Team Project 1	Porsche 911 RSR-19	Porsche M97/80 4.2 L Flat-6	M	46	(Denmark) Mikkel O. Pedersen	All
(Germany) Team Project 1	Porsche 911 RSR-19	Porsche M97/80 4.2 L Flat-6	M	56	(United Kingdom) Ben Barnicoat	All
(Germany) Team Project 1	Porsche 911 RSR-19	Porsche M97/80 4.2 L Flat-6	M	56	(United Kingdom) Ollie Millroy	1–5
(Germany) Team Project 1	Porsche 911 RSR-19	Porsche M97/80 4.2 L Flat-6	M	56	(United States) Brendan Iribe	1–4
(Germany) Team Project 1	Porsche 911 RSR-19	Porsche M97/80 4.2 L Flat-6	M	56	(Japan) Takeshi Kimura	5
(Germany) Team Project 1	Porsche 911 RSR-19	Porsche M97/80 4.2 L Flat-6	M	56	(United States) P. J. Hyett	6
(Germany) Team Project 1	Porsche 911 RSR-19	Porsche M97/80 4.2 L Flat-6	M	56	(United States) Gunnar Jeannette	6
(Italy) Iron Lynx	Ferrari 488 GTE Evo	Ferrari F154CB 4.0 L Turbo V8	M	60	(Italy) Claudio Schiavoni	All
(Italy) Iron Lynx	Ferrari 488 GTE Evo	Ferrari F154CB 4.0 L Turbo V8	M	60	(Italy) Matteo Cressoni	1–2, 4–6
(Italy) Iron Lynx	Ferrari 488 GTE Evo	Ferrari F154CB 4.0 L Turbo V8	M	60	(Italy) Giancarlo Fisichella	1–2, 4–6
(Italy) Iron Lynx	Ferrari 488 GTE Evo	Ferrari F154CB 4.0 L Turbo V8	M	60	(Italy) Alessandro Balzan	3
(Italy) Iron Lynx	Ferrari 488 GTE Evo	Ferrari F154CB 4.0 L Turbo V8	M	60	(Italy) Raffaele Giammaria	3
(Italy) Iron Dames	Ferrari 488 GTE Evo	Ferrari F154CB 4.0 L Turbo V8	M	85	(Switzerland) Rahel Frey	All
(Italy) Iron Dames	Ferrari 488 GTE Evo	Ferrari F154CB 4.0 L Turbo V8	M	85	(Belgium) Sarah Bovy	1, 3–6
(Italy) Iron Dames	Ferrari 488 GTE Evo	Ferrari F154CB 4.0 L Turbo V8	M	85	(Denmark) Michelle Gatting	1, 3–6
(Italy) Iron Dames	Ferrari 488 GTE Evo	Ferrari F154CB 4.0 L Turbo V8	M	85	(Denmark) Christina Nielsen	2
(Italy) Iron Dames	Ferrari 488 GTE Evo	Ferrari F154CB 4.0 L Turbo V8	M	85	(France) Doriane Pin	2
(Germany) Dempsey-Proton Racing	Porsche 911 RSR-19	Porsche M97/80 4.2 L Flat-6	M	77	(United Kingdom) Sebastian Priaulx	All
(Germany) Dempsey-Proton Racing	Porsche 911 RSR-19	Porsche M97/80 4.2 L Flat-6	M	77	(Germany) Christian Ried	All
(Germany) Dempsey-Proton Racing	Porsche 911 RSR-19	Porsche M97/80 4.2 L Flat-6	M	77	(United Kingdom) Harry Tincknell	All
(Germany) Dempsey-Proton Racing	Porsche 911 RSR-19	Porsche M97/80 4.2 L Flat-6	M	88	(United States) Fred Poordad	All
(Germany) Dempsey-Proton Racing	Porsche 911 RSR-19	Porsche M97/80 4.2 L Flat-6	M	88	(United States) Patrick Lindsey	1–2, 4–6
(Germany) Dempsey-Proton Racing	Porsche 911 RSR-19	Porsche M97/80 4.2 L Flat-6	M	88	(France) Julien Andlauer	1
(Germany) Dempsey-Proton Racing	Porsche 911 RSR-19	Porsche M97/80 4.2 L Flat-6	M	88	(Belgium) Jan Heylen	2–6
(Germany) Dempsey-Proton Racing	Porsche 911 RSR-19	Porsche M97/80 4.2 L Flat-6	M	88	(United States) Maxwell Root	3
(United Kingdom) GR Racing	Porsche 911 RSR-19	Porsche M97/80 4.2 L Flat-6	M	86	(United Kingdom) Ben Barker	2–6
(United Kingdom) GR Racing	Porsche 911 RSR-19	Porsche M97/80 4.2 L Flat-6	M	86	(Italy) Riccardo Pera	2–6
(United Kingdom) GR Racing	Porsche 911 RSR-19	Porsche M97/80 4.2 L Flat-6	M	86	(United Kingdom) Michael Wainwright	2–6
(Canada) NorthWest AMR	Aston Martin Vantage AMR	Aston Martin M177 4.0 L Turbo V8	M	98	(Canada) Paul Dalla Lana	All
(Canada) NorthWest AMR	Aston Martin Vantage AMR	Aston Martin M177 4.0 L Turbo V8	M	98	(Denmark) Nicki Thiim	All
(Canada) NorthWest AMR	Aston Martin Vantage AMR	Aston Martin M177 4.0 L Turbo V8	M	98	(United Kingdom) David Pittard	All

== Results and standings ==
=== Race results ===
The highest finishing competitor entered in the World Endurance Championship is listed below. Invitational entries may have finished ahead of WEC competitors in individual races.

Rnd.	Circuit	Hypercar Winners	LMP2 Winners	LMP2 Pro-Am Winners	LMGTE Pro Winners	LMGTE Am Winners	Report
1	(United States) Sebring	(France) No. 36 Alpine Elf Team	(United States) No. 23 United Autosports USA	(Italy) No. 83 AF Corse	(Germany) No. 92 Porsche GT Team	(Canada) No. 98 NorthWest AMR	Report
1	(United States) Sebring	(France) Nicolas Lapierre (Brazil) André Negrão (France) Matthieu Vaxivière	(United Kingdom) Paul di Resta (United States) Josh Pierson (United Kingdom) Oliver Jarvis	(Denmark) Nicklas Nielsen (France) François Perrodo (Italy) Alessio Rovera	(Denmark) Michael Christensen (France) Kévin Estre	(Canada) Paul Dalla Lana (United Kingdom) David Pittard (Denmark) Nicki Thiim	Report
2	(Belgium) Spa	(Japan) No. 7 Toyota Gazoo Racing	(Belgium) No. 31 WRT	(Italy) No. 83 AF Corse	(Italy) No. 51 AF Corse	(Germany) No. 77 Dempsey-Proton Racing	Report
2	(Belgium) Spa	(United Kingdom) Mike Conway (Japan) Kamui Kobayashi (Argentina) José María López	(Netherlands) Robin Frijns (Indonesia) Sean Gelael (Germany) René Rast	(Denmark) Nicklas Nielsen (France) François Perrodo (Italy) Alessio Rovera	(United Kingdom) James Calado (Italy) Alessandro Pier Guidi	(United Kingdom) Sebastian Priaulx (Germany) Christian Ried (United Kingdom) Harry Tincknell	Report
3	(France) Le Mans	(Japan) No. 8 Toyota Gazoo Racing	(United Kingdom) No. 38 Jota	(Portugal) No. 45 Algarve Pro Racing	(Germany) No. 91 Porsche GT Team	(United Kingdom) No. 33 TF Sport	Report
3	(France) Le Mans	(Switzerland) Sébastien Buemi (New Zealand) Brendon Hartley (Japan) Ryō Hirakawa	(Portugal) António Félix da Costa (Mexico) Roberto González (United Kingdom) Will Stevens	(Australia) James Allen (Austria) René Binder (United States) Steven Thomas	(Italy) Gianmaria Bruni (Austria) Richard Lietz (France) Frédéric Makowiecki	(Portugal) Henrique Chaves (United States) Ben Keating (Denmark) Marco Sørensen	Report
4	(Italy) Monza	(France) No. 36 Alpine Elf Team	(Switzerland) No. 41 RealTeam by WRT	(Portugal) No. 45 Algarve Pro Racing	(United States) No. 64 Corvette Racing	(Germany) No. 77 Dempsey-Proton Racing	Report
4	(Italy) Monza	(France) Nicolas Lapierre (Brazil) André Negrão (France) Matthieu Vaxivière	(Portugal) Rui Andrade (Austria) Ferdinand Habsburg (France) Norman Nato	(Australia) James Allen (Austria) René Binder (United States) Steven Thomas	(United States) Tommy Milner (United Kingdom) Nick Tandy	(United Kingdom) Sebastian Priaulx (Germany) Christian Ried (United Kingdom) Harry Tincknell	Report
5	(Japan) Fuji	(Japan) No. 8 Toyota Gazoo Racing	(Belgium) No. 31 WRT	(Italy) No. 83 AF Corse	(Italy) No. 51 AF Corse	(United Kingdom) No. 33 TF Sport	Report
5	(Japan) Fuji	(Switzerland) Sébastien Buemi (New Zealand) Brendon Hartley (Japan) Ryō Hirakawa	(Netherlands) Robin Frijns (Indonesia) Sean Gelael (Belgium) Dries Vanthoor	(Denmark) Nicklas Nielsen (France) François Perrodo (Italy) Alessio Rovera	(United Kingdom) James Calado (Italy) Alessandro Pier Guidi	(Portugal) Henrique Chaves (United States) Ben Keating (Denmark) Marco Sørensen	Report
6	Bahrain	(Japan) No. 7 Toyota Gazoo Racing	(Belgium) No. 31 WRT	(Italy) No. 83 AF Corse	(Italy) No. 52 AF Corse	(Germany) No. 46 Team Project 1	Report
6	Bahrain	(United Kingdom) Mike Conway (Japan) Kamui Kobayashi (Argentina) José María López	(Netherlands) Robin Frijns (Indonesia) Sean Gelael (Germany) René Rast	(Denmark) Nicklas Nielsen (France) François Perrodo (Italy) Alessio Rovera	(Italy) Antonio Fuoco (Spain) Miguel Molina	(Italy) Matteo Cairoli (Switzerland) Nicolas Leutwiler (Denmark) Mikkel O. Pedersen	Report

=== Drivers' championships ===
Five titles were offered to drivers, two with world championship status. The Hypercar World Endurance Drivers' Championship was reserved for Hypercar drivers while the GTE World Endurance Drivers' Championship was available for drivers in the LMGTE categories. FIA Endurance Trophies were awarded in LMP2, in LMP2 Pro/Am and in LMGTE Am.

Entries were required to complete the timed race as well as to complete 70% of the overall winning car's race distance in order to earn championship points. A single bonus point was awarded to the team and all drivers of the pole position car for each category in qualifying. Furthermore, a race must complete two laps under green flag conditions in order for championship points to be awarded.

Points systems
Duration	1st	2nd	3rd	4th	5th	6th	7th	8th	9th	10th	Pole
6 Hours	25	18	15	12	10	8	6	4	2	1	1
8 Hours	38	27	23	18	15	12	9	6	3	2	1
24 Hours	50	36	30	24	20	16	12	8	4	2	1

==== Hypercar World Endurance Drivers' Championship ====
Pos.	Driver	Team	SEB (United States)	SPA (Belgium)	LMS (France)	MNZ (Italy)	FUJ (Japan)	BHR (Bahrain)	Points
1	(New Zealand) Brendon Hartley	(Japan) Toyota Gazoo Racing	2	Ret	**1**	2	1	**2**	149
1	(Japan) Ryō Hirakawa	(Japan) Toyota Gazoo Racing	2	Ret	**1**	2	1	**2**	149
1	(Switzerland) Sébastien Buemi	(Japan) Toyota Gazoo Racing	2	Ret	**1**	2	1	**2**	149
2	(Brazil) André Negrão	(France) Alpine Elf Team	**1**	2	4	1	3	3	144
2	(France) Matthieu Vaxivière	(France) Alpine Elf Team	**1**	2	4	1	3	3	144
2	(France) Nicolas Lapierre	(France) Alpine Elf Team	**1**	2	4	1	3	3	144
3	(Argentina) José María López	(Japan) Toyota Gazoo Racing	Ret	1	2	3	**2**	1	133
3	(Japan) Kamui Kobayashi	(Japan) Toyota Gazoo Racing	Ret	1	2	3	**2**	1	133
3	(United Kingdom) Mike Conway	(Japan) Toyota Gazoo Racing	Ret	1	2	3	**2**	1	133
4	(France) Olivier Pla	(United States) Glickenhaus Racing	3	**3**	3	**Ret**			70
4	(France) Romain Dumas	(United States) Glickenhaus Racing	3	**3**	3	**Ret**			70
5	(Brazil) Pipo Derani	(United States) Glickenhaus Racing		**3**	3	**Ret**			47
6	(France) Loïc Duval	(France) Peugeot TotalEnergies				4	5	4	40
6	(United States) Gustavo Menezes	(France) Peugeot TotalEnergies				4	5	4	40
7	(Australia) Ryan Briscoe	(United States) Glickenhaus Racing	3						23
8	(United Kingdom) James Rossiter	(France) Peugeot TotalEnergies				4	5		22
9	(Switzerland) Nico Müller	(France) Peugeot TotalEnergies						4	18
10	(United Kingdom) Paul di Resta	(France) Peugeot TotalEnergies				Ret	4	Ret	12
10	(Denmark) Mikkel Jensen	(France) Peugeot TotalEnergies				Ret	4	Ret	12
10	(France) Jean-Éric Vergne	(France) Peugeot TotalEnergies				Ret	4	Ret	12
Pos.	Driver	Team	SEB (United States)	SPA (Belgium)	LMS (France)	MNZ (Italy)	FUJ (Japan)	BHR (Bahrain)	Points

Colour	Result
Gold	Winner
Silver	Second place
Bronze	Third place
Green	Points classification
Blue	Non-points classification
Blue	Non-classified finish (NC)
Purple	Retired, not classified (Ret)
Red	Did not qualify (DNQ)
Red	Did not pre-qualify (DNPQ)
Black	Disqualified (DSQ)
White	Did not start (DNS)
White	Withdrew (WD)
White	Race cancelled (C)
Blank	Did not practice (DNP)
Blank	Did not arrive (DNA)
Blank	Excluded (EX)

**Bold** - Pole position

==== World Endurance GTE Drivers' Championship ====
Pos.	Driver	Team	SEB (United States)	SPA (Belgium)	LMS (France)	MNZ (Italy)	FUJ (Japan)	BHR (Bahrain)	Points
1	(Italy) Alessandro Pier Guidi	(Italy) AF Corse	4	1	2	**3**	1	5	135
1	(United Kingdom) James Calado	(Italy) AF Corse	4	1	2	**3**	1	5	135
2	(France) Kévin Estre	(Germany) Porsche GT Team	**1**	2	4	4	**3**	3	132
2	(Denmark) Michael Christensen	(Germany) Porsche GT Team	**1**	2	4	4	**3**	3	132
3	(Italy) Antonio Fuoco	(Italy) AF Corse	6	3	3	2	2	1	131
3	(Spain) Miguel Molina	(Italy) AF Corse	6	3	3	2	2	1	131
4	(Italy) Gianmaria Bruni	(Germany) Porsche GT Team	3	**5**	1	5	4	**4**	125
5	(Austria) Richard Lietz	(Germany) Porsche GT Team	3	**5**	1		4	**4**	115
6	(United Kingdom) Nick Tandy	(United States) Corvette Racing	2	4	**Ret**	1	5	2	102
6	(United States) Tommy Milner	(United States) Corvette Racing	2	4	**Ret**	1	5	2	102
7	(France) Frédéric Makowiecki	(Germany) Porsche GT Team			1	5			60
8	(United States) Ben Keating	(United Kingdom) TF Sport	6	7	5	Ret	6	9	46
8	(Denmark) Marco Sørensen	(United Kingdom) TF Sport	6	7	5	Ret	6	9	46
9	(United Kingdom) David Pittard	(Canada) NorthWest AMR	5	8	6	13	10	10	38
9	(Denmark) Nicki Thiim	(Canada) NorthWest AMR	5	8	6	13	10	10	38
9	(Canada) Paul Dalla Lana	(Canada) NorthWest AMR	5	8	6	13	10	10	38
10	(Portugal) Henrique Chaves	(United Kingdom) TF Sport		7	5	Ret	6	9	37
11	(Brazil) Daniel Serra	(Italy) AF Corse			2				36
12	(Italy) Davide Rigon	(Italy) AF Corse			3		9		32
13	(Belgium) Laurens Vanthoor	(Germany) Porsche GT Team			4				24
14	(Switzerland) Rahel Frey	(Italy) Iron Dames	10	15	10	7	7	8	22
14	(Denmark) Michelle Gatting	(Italy) Iron Dames	10		10	7	7	8	22
14	(Belgium) Sarah Bovy	(Italy) Iron Dames	10		10	7	7	8	22
15	(Germany) Christian Ried	(Germany) Dempsey-Proton Racing	9	6	12	6	Ret	13	19
15	(United Kingdom) Harry Tincknell	(Germany) Dempsey-Proton Racing	9	6	12	6	Ret	13	19
15	(United Kingdom) Sebastian Priaulx	(Germany) Dempsey-Proton Racing	9	6	12	6	Ret	13	19
16	(Italy) Matteo Cairoli	(Germany) Team Project 1	Ret	10	Ret	8	11	6	17
16	(Denmark) Mikkel O. Pedersen	(Germany) Team Project 1	Ret	10	Ret	8	11	6	17
16	(Switzerland) Nicolas Leutwiler	(Germany) Team Project 1	Ret	10	Ret	8	11	6	17
17	(United Kingdom) Ben Barnicoat	(Germany) Team Project 1	8	Ret	Ret	15	13	7	15
18	(United Kingdom) Ben Barker	(United Kingdom) GR Racing		11	7	17	17	11	12
18	(United Kingdom) Michael Wainwright	(United Kingdom) GR Racing		11	7	17	17	11	12
18	(Italy) Riccardo Pera	(United Kingdom) GR Racing		11	7	17	17	11	12
19	(France) Florian Latorre	(United Kingdom) TF Sport	6						9
20	(United States) P. J. Hyett	(Germany) Team Project 1						7	9
20	(United States) Gunnar Jeannette	(Germany) Team Project 1						7	9
21	(United States) Fred Poordad	(Germany) Dempsey-Proton Racing	15	14	8	11	14	17	8
21	(Belgium) Jan Heylen	(Germany) Dempsey-Proton Racing		14	8	11	14	17	8
21	(United States) Maxwell Root	(Germany) Dempsey-Proton Racing			8				8
22	(Italy) Francesco Castellacci	(Italy) AF Corse	14	9	9	14	9	12	8
22	(Switzerland) Thomas Flohr	(Italy) AF Corse	14	9	9	14	9	12	8
23	(United Kingdom) Ollie Millroy	(Germany) Team Project 1	8	Ret	Ret	15	13		6
23	(United States) Brendan Iribe	(Germany) Team Project 1	8	Ret	Ret	15			6
24	(New Zealand) Nick Cassidy	(Italy) AF Corse	14	9	9	14		12	6
25	(United Kingdom) Charlie Fagg	(Japan) D'station Racing	11	12	Ret	16	8	15	4
25	(Japan) Satoshi Hoshino	(Japan) D'station Racing	11	12	Ret	16	8	15	4
25	(Japan) Tomonobu Fujii	(Japan) D'station Racing	11	12	Ret	16	8	15	4
26	(Italy) Claudio Schiavoni	(Italy) Iron Lynx	13	13	Ret	9	16	14	2
26	(Italy) Giancarlo Fisichella	(Italy) Iron Lynx	13	13		9	16	14	2
26	(Italy) Matteo Cressoni	(Italy) Iron Lynx	13	13		9	16	14	2
27	(France) Franck Dezoteux	(Switzerland) Spirit of Race	Ret	17	Ret	10	12	18	1
27	(France) Gabriel Aubry	(Switzerland) Spirit of Race	Ret	17	Ret	10	12	18	1
27	(France) Pierre Ragues	(Switzerland) Spirit of Race	Ret	17	Ret	10	12	18	1
28	(United Kingdom) Alexander Sims	(United States) Corvette Racing			**Ret**				1
29	(Switzerland) Christoph Ulrich	(Italy) AF Corse	12	16	11	12	15	16	0
29	(United States) Simon Mann	(Italy) AF Corse	12	16	11	12	15	16	0
29	(Finland) Toni Vilander	(Italy) AF Corse	12	16	11	12	15	16	0
30	(United States) Patrick Lindsey	(Germany) Dempsey-Proton Racing	15	14		11	14	17	0
31	(Japan) Takeshi Kimura	(Germany) Team Project 1					13		0
32	(France) Julien Andlauer	(Germany) Dempsey-Proton Racing	15						0
32	(Denmark) Christina Nielsen	(Italy) Iron Dames		15					0
32	(France) Doriane Pin	(Italy) Iron Dames		15					0
33	(Italy) Alessandro Balzan	(Italy) Iron Lynx			Ret				0
33	(Italy) Raffaele Giammaria	(Italy) Iron Lynx			Ret				0
Pos.	Driver	Team	SEB (United States)	SPA (Belgium)	LMS (France)	MNZ (Italy)	FUJ (Japan)	BHR (Bahrain)	Points

==== FIA Endurance Trophy for LMP2 Drivers ====
Pos.	Driver	Team	SEB (United States)	SPA (Belgium)	LMS (France)	MNZ (Italy)	FUJ (Japan)	BHR (Bahrain)	Points
1	(Portugal) António Félix da Costa	(United Kingdom) Jota	6	3	1	2	**2**	3	137
1	(Mexico) Roberto González	(United Kingdom) Jota	6	3	1	2	**2**	3	137
1	(United Kingdom) Will Stevens	(United Kingdom) Jota	6	3	1	2	**2**	3	137
2	(Netherlands) Robin Frijns	(Belgium) WRT	2	1	**Ret**	12	1	1	116
2	(Indonesia) Sean Gelael	(Belgium) WRT	2	1	**Ret**	12	1	1	116
3	(United States) Josh Pierson	(United States) United Autosports USA	1	6	5	5	5	2	113
3	(United Kingdom) Oliver Jarvis	(United States) United Autosports USA	1	6	5	5	5	2	113
4	(Austria) Ferdinand Habsburg	(Switzerland) RealTeam by WRT	3	2	10	1	4	**5**	96
4	(France) Norman Nato	(Switzerland) RealTeam by WRT	3	2	10	1	4	**5**	96
4	(Portugal) Rui Andrade	(Switzerland) RealTeam by WRT	3	2	10	1	4	**5**	96
5	(Italy) Lorenzo Colombo	(Italy) Prema Orlen Team	4	7	2	6	6	4	94
5	(Switzerland) Louis Delétraz	(Italy) Prema Orlen Team	4	7	2	6	6	4	94
5	(Poland) Robert Kubica	(Italy) Prema Orlen Team	4	7	2	6	6	4	94
6	(Germany) René Rast	(Belgium) WRT	2	1	**Ret**	12		1	91
7	(United Kingdom) Alex Lynn	(United States) United Autosports USA		6	5	5	5	2	75
8	(United Arab Emirates) Ed Jones	(United Kingdom) Jota	5	Ret	3	10	3	7	70
8	(South Africa) Jonathan Aberdein	(United Kingdom) Jota	5	Ret	3	10	3	7	70
8	(Denmark) Oliver Rasmussen	(United Kingdom) Jota	5	Ret	3	10	3	7	70
9	(Portugal) Filipe Albuquerque	(United States) United Autosports USA	7	5	7	**13**	7	6	50
9	(United Kingdom) Phil Hanson	(United States) United Autosports USA	7	5	7	**13**	7	6	50
9	(United States) Will Owen	(United States) United Autosports USA	7	5	7	**13**	7	6	50
10	(United States) Dane Cameron	(United States) Team Penske	8	4	4				42
10	(France) Emmanuel Collard	(United States) Team Penske	8	4	4				42
10	(Brazil) Felipe Nasr	(United States) Team Penske	8	4	4				42
11	(United Kingdom) Paul di Resta	(United States) United Autosports USA	1						38
12	(France) Charles Milesi	(France) Richard Mille Racing Team	12	8	6	14	8	8	30
12	(France) Lilou Wadoux	(France) Richard Mille Racing Team	12	8	6	14	8	8	30
13	(Belgium) Dries Vanthoor	(Belgium) WRT					1		25
14	(Republic of Ireland) Ryan Cullen	(United Kingdom) Vector Sport	NC	10	13	3	9	9	21
14	(France) Sébastien Bourdais	(United Kingdom) Vector Sport		10	13	3	9	9	21
15	(Mexico) Esteban Gutiérrez	(Poland) Inter Europol Competition	NC	Ret	8	4	11	NC	20
15	(Poland) Jakub Śmiechowski	(Poland) Inter Europol Competition	NC	Ret	8	4	11	NC	20
15	(United Kingdom) Alex Brundle	(Poland) Inter Europol Competition		Ret	8	4	11	NC	20
16	(France) Sébastien Ogier	(France) Richard Mille Racing Team	12	8	6				20
17	(Switzerland) Nico Müller	(United Kingdom) Vector Sport	NC	10	13	3			16
18	(Italy) Alessio Rovera	(Italy) AF Corse	**9**	**9**	11	9	10	10	12
18	(France) François Perrodo	(Italy) AF Corse	**9**	**9**	11	9	10	10	12
18	(Denmark) Nicklas Nielsen	(Italy) AF Corse	**9**	**9**	11	9	10	10	12
19	(Australia) James Allen	(Portugal) Algarve Pro Racing	11	11	9	7	13	12	10
19	(Austria) René Binder	(Portugal) Algarve Pro Racing	11	11	9	7	13	12	10
19	(United States) Steven Thomas	(Portugal) Algarve Pro Racing	11	11	9	7	13	12	10
20	(France) Paul-Loup Chatin	(France) Richard Mille Racing Team				14	8	8	10
21	(France) François Hériau	(France) Ultimate	10	12	14	8	12	11	6
21	(France) Jean-Baptiste Lahaye	(France) Ultimate	10	12	14	8	12	11	6
21	(France) Matthieu Lahaye	(France) Ultimate	10	12	14	8	12	11	6
22	(Netherlands) Renger van der Zande	(United Kingdom) Vector Sport					9	9	5
23	(Slovakia) Miroslav Konôpka	(Slovakia) ARC Bratislava	13	Ret	12	11		13	0
24	(Netherlands) Tijmen van der Helm	(Slovakia) ARC Bratislava	13	Ret		11			0
25	(Switzerland) Mathias Beche	(Slovakia) ARC Bratislava	13			11		13	0
26	(Netherlands) Bent Viscaal	(Slovakia) ARC Bratislava		Ret	12				0
27	(France) Tristan Vautier	(Slovakia) ARC Bratislava			12				0
28	(United Kingdom) Richard Bradley	(Slovakia) ARC Bratislava						13	0
29	(Switzerland) Fabio Scherer	(Poland) Inter Europol Competition	NC						0
30	(Germany) Mike Rockenfeller	(United Kingdom) Vector Sport	NC						0
Pos.	Driver	Team	SEB (United States)	SPA (Belgium)	LMS (France)	MNZ (Italy)	FUJ (Japan)	BHR (Bahrain)	Points

==== FIA Endurance Trophy for LMP2 Pro/Am Drivers ====
Pos.	Driver	Team	SEB (United States)	SPA (Belgium)	LMS (France)	MNZ (Italy)	FUJ (Japan)	BHR (Bahrain)	Points
1	(Italy) Alessio Rovera	(Italy) AF Corse	1	1	2	3	1	1	177
1	(France) François Perrodo	(Italy) AF Corse	1	1	2	3	1	1	177
1	(Denmark) Nicklas Nielsen	(Italy) AF Corse	1	1	2	3	1	1	177
2	(Australia) James Allen	(Portugal) Algarve Pro Racing	3	2	1	1	3	3	154
2	(Austria) René Binder	(Portugal) Algarve Pro Racing	3	2	1	1	3	3	154
2	(United States) Steven Thomas	(Portugal) Algarve Pro Racing	3	2	1	1	3	3	154
3	(France) François Hériau	(France) Ultimate	2	3	4	2	2	2	129
3	(France) Jean-Baptiste Lahaye	(France) Ultimate	2	3	4	2	2	2	129
3	(France) Matthieu Lahaye	(France) Ultimate	2	3	4	2	2	2	129
4	(Slovakia) Miroslav Konôpka	(Slovakia) ARC Bratislava	4	Ret	3	4		4	78
5	(Switzerland) Mathias Beche	(Slovakia) ARC Bratislava	4			4		4	48
6	(Netherlands) Bent Viscaal	(Slovakia) ARC Bratislava		Ret	3				30
6	(France) Tristan Vautier	(Slovakia) ARC Bratislava			3				30
7	(Netherlands) Tijmen van der Helm	(Slovakia) ARC Bratislava	4	Ret		4			30
8	(United Kingdom) Richard Bradley	(Slovakia) ARC Bratislava						4	18
Pos.	Driver	Team	SEB (United States)	SPA (Belgium)	LMS (France)	MNZ (Italy)	FUJ (Japan)	BHR (Bahrain)	Points

==== FIA Endurance Trophy for GTE Am Drivers ====
Pos.	Driver	Team	SEB (United States)	SPA (Belgium)	LMS (France)	MNZ (Italy)	FUJ (Japan)	BHR (Bahrain)	Points
1	(United States) Ben Keating	(United Kingdom) TF Sport	**2**	**2**	1	Ret	**1**	4	141
1	(Denmark) Marco Sørensen	(United Kingdom) TF Sport	**2**	**2**	1	Ret	**1**	4	141
2	(United Kingdom) David Pittard	(Canada) NorthWest AMR	1	3	2	8	5	5	118
2	(Denmark) Nicki Thiim	(Canada) NorthWest AMR	1	3	2	8	5	5	118
2	(Canada) Paul Dalla Lana	(Canada) NorthWest AMR	1	3	2	8	5	5	118
3	(Portugal) Henrique Chaves	(United Kingdom) TF Sport		**2**	1	Ret	**1**	4	113
4	(Switzerland) Rahel Frey	(Italy) Iron Dames	5	10	6	**2**	2	**3**	93
5	(Denmark) Michelle Gatting	(Italy) Iron Dames	5		6	**2**	2	**3**	92
5	(Belgium) Sarah Bovy	(Italy) Iron Dames	5		6	**2**	2	**3**	92
6	(Germany) Christian Ried	(Germany) Dempsey-Proton Racing	4	1	**8**	1	Ret	8	83
6	(United Kingdom) Harry Tincknell	(Germany) Dempsey-Proton Racing	4	1	**8**	1	Ret	8	83
6	(United Kingdom) Sebastian Priaulx	(Germany) Dempsey-Proton Racing	4	1	**8**	1	Ret	8	83
7	(Italy) Matteo Cairoli	(Germany) Team Project 1	Ret	5	Ret	3	6	1	71
7	(Switzerland) Nicolas Leutwiler	(Germany) Team Project 1	Ret	5	Ret	3	6	1	71
7	(Denmark) Mikkel O. Pedersen	(Germany) Team Project 1	Ret	5	Ret	3	6	1	71
8	(Italy) Francesco Castellacci	(Italy) AF Corse	9	4	5	9	4	7	58
8	(Switzerland) Thomas Flohr	(Italy) AF Corse	9	4	5	9	4	7	58
9	(United Kingdom) Ben Barnicoat	(Germany) Team Project 1	3	Ret	Ret	10	8	2	55
10	(United Kingdom) Ben Barker	(United Kingdom) GR Racing		6	3	12	12	6	50
10	(United Kingdom) Michael Wainwright	(United Kingdom) GR Racing		6	3	12	12	6	50
10	(Italy) Riccardo Pera	(United Kingdom) GR Racing		6	3	12	12	6	50
11	(New Zealand) Nick Cassidy	(Italy) AF Corse	9	4	5	9		7	46
12	(United States) Fred Poordad	(Germany) Dempsey-Proton Racing	10	9	4	6	9	12	38
13	(Belgium) Jan Heylen	(Germany) Dempsey-Proton Racing		9	4	6	9	12	37
14	(United Kingdom) Charlie Fagg	(Japan) D'station Racing	6	7	Ret	11	3	10	35
14	(Japan) Satoshi Hoshino	(Japan) D'station Racing	6	7	Ret	11	3	10	35
14	(Japan) Tomonobu Fujii	(Japan) D'station Racing	6	7	Ret	11	3	10	35
15	(France) Florian Latorre	(United Kingdom) TF Sport	**2**						28
16	(United Kingdom) Ollie Millroy	(Germany) Team Project 1	3	Ret	Ret	10	8		28
17	(Switzerland) Christoph Ulrich	(Italy) AF Corse	7	11	7	7	10	11	28
17	(United States) Simon Mann	(Italy) AF Corse	7	11	7	7	10	11	28
17	(Finland) Toni Vilander	(Italy) AF Corse	7	11	7	7	10	11	28
18	(United States) P. J. Hyett	(Germany) Team Project 1						2	27
18	(United States) Gunnar Jeannette	(Germany) Team Project 1						2	27
19	(Italy) Claudio Schiavoni	(Italy) Iron Lynx	8	8	Ret	4	11	9	25
19	(Italy) Giancarlo Fisichella	(Italy) Iron Lynx	8	8		4	11	9	25
19	(Italy) Matteo Cressoni	(Italy) Iron Lynx	8	8		4	11	9	25
20	(United States) Brendan Iribe	(Germany) Team Project 1	3	Ret	Ret	10			24
21	(United States) Maxwell Root	(Germany) Dempsey-Proton Racing			4				24
22	(France) Franck Dezoteux	(Switzerland) Spirit of Race	Ret	12	Ret	5	7	13	16
22	(France) Gabriel Aubry	(Switzerland) Spirit of Race	Ret	12	Ret	5	7	13	16
22	(France) Pierre Ragues	(Switzerland) Spirit of Race	Ret	12	Ret	5	7	13	16
23	(United States) Patrick Lindsey	(Germany) Dempsey-Proton Racing	10	9		6	9	12	14
24	(Italy) Davide Rigon	(Italy) AF Corse					4		12
25	(Japan) Takeshi Kimura	(Germany) Team Project 1					8		4
26	(France) Julien Andlauer	(Germany) Dempsey-Proton Racing	10						2
27	(Denmark) Christina Nielsen	(Italy) Iron Dames		10					1
27	(France) Doriane Pin	(Italy) Iron Dames		10					1
28	(Italy) Alessandro Balzan	(Italy) Iron Lynx			Ret				0
28	(Italy) Raffaele Giammaria	(Italy) Iron Lynx			Ret				0
Pos.	Driver	Team	SEB (United States)	SPA (Belgium)	LMS (France)	MNZ (Italy)	FUJ (Japan)	BHR (Bahrain)	Points

=== Manufacturers' and teams' championships ===
A world championship was awarded for Hypercar and LMGTE manufacturers. FIA Endurance Trophies were awarded for LMP2, LMP2 Pro/Am and LMGTE Am teams.

==== Hypercar World Endurance Manufacturers' Championship ====
Points were awarded only for the highest finishing competitor from each manufacturer.

Pos.	Manufacturer	SEB (United States)	SPA (Belgium)	LMS (France)	MNZ (Italy)	FUJ (Japan)	BHR (Bahrain)	Points
1	(Japan) Toyota	2	1	**1**	2	**1**	**1**	186
2	(France) Alpine	**1**	2	4	1	3	3	144
3	(United States) Glickenhaus	3	**3**	3	**Ret**			70
4	(France) Peugeot				4	4	4	42

==== GTE Manufacturers FIA World Endurance Championship ====
Points were awarded to the two best finishing cars from each manufacturer across both GTE categories.

Pos.	Manufacturer	SEB (United States)	SPA (Belgium)	LMS (France)	MNZ (Italy)	FUJ (Japan)	BHR (Bahrain)	Points
1	(Italy) Ferrari	4	1	2	2	1	1	269
1	(Italy) Ferrari	6	3	3	**3**	2	5	269
2	(Germany) Porsche	**1**	2	1	4	**3**	3	257
2	(Germany) Porsche	3	**5**	4	5	4	**4**	257
3	(United States) Chevrolet	2	4	**Ret**	1	5	2	102

==== Endurance Trophy for LMP2 Teams ====
Pos.	Car	Team	SEB (United States)	SPA (Belgium)	LMS (France)	MNZ (Italy)	FUJ (Japan)	BHR (Bahrain)	Points
1	38	(United Kingdom) Jota	6	3	1	2	**2**	3	137
2	31	(Belgium) WRT	2	1	**Ret**	12	1	1	116
3	23	(United States) United Autosports USA	1	6	5	5	5	2	113
4	41	(Switzerland) RealTeam by WRT	3	2	10	1	4	**5**	96
5	9	(Italy) Prema Orlen Team	4	7	2	6	6	4	94
6	28	(United Kingdom) Jota	5	Ret	3	10	3	7	70
7	22	(United States) United Autosports USA	7	5	7	**13**	7	6	50
8	5	(United States) Team Penske	8	4	4				42
9	1	(France) Richard Mille Racing Team	12	8	6	14	8	8	30
10	10	(United Kingdom) Vector Sport	NC	10	13	3	9	9	21
11	34	(Poland) Inter Europol Competition	NC	Ret	8	4	11	NC	20
12	83	(Italy) AF Corse	**9**	**9**	11	9	10	10	12
13	45	(Portugal) Algarve Pro Racing	11	11	9	7	13	12	10
14	35	(France) Ultimate	10	12	14	8	12	11	6
15	44	(Slovakia) ARC Bratislava	13	Ret	12	11		13	0

==== Endurance Trophy for LMP2 Pro/Am Teams ====
Pos.	Car	Team	SEB (United States)	SPA (Belgium)	LMS (France)	MNZ (Italy)	FUJ (Japan)	BHR (Bahrain)	Points
1	83	(Italy) AF Corse	1	1	2	3	1	1	177
2	45	(Portugal) Algarve Pro Racing	3	2	1	1	3	3	154
3	35	(France) Ultimate	2	3	4	2	2	2	129
4	44	(Slovakia) ARC Bratislava	4	Ret	3	4		4	78

==== Endurance Trophy for GTE Am Teams ====
Pos.	Car	Team	SEB (United States)	SPA (Belgium)	LMS (France)	MNZ (Italy)	FUJ (Japan)	BHR (Bahrain)	Points
1	33	(United Kingdom) TF Sport	**2**	**2**	1	Ret	**1**	4	141
2	98	(Canada) NorthWest AMR	1	3	2	8	5	5	118
3	85	(Italy) Iron Dames	5	10	6	**2**	2	**3**	93
4	77	(Germany) Dempsey-Proton Racing	4	1	**8**	1	Ret	8	83
5	46	(Germany) Team Project 1	Ret	5	Ret	3	6	1	71
6	54	(Italy) AF Corse	9	4	5	9	4	7	58
7	56	(Germany) Team Project 1	3	Ret	Ret	10	8	2	55
8	86	(United Kingdom) GR Racing		6	3	12	12	6	50
9	88	(Germany) Dempsey-Proton Racing	10	9	4	6	9	12	38
10	777	(Japan) D'station Racing	6	7	Ret	11	3	10	35
11	21	(Italy) AF Corse	7	11	7	7	10	11	28
12	60	(Italy) Iron Lynx	8	8	Ret	4	11	9	25
13	71	(Switzerland) Spirit of Race	Ret	12	Ret	5	7	13	16
