= Oreca =

French auto racing team

(France) Oreca
- Founded: 1973
- Founder(s): Hugues de Chaunac
- Base: Magny-Cours, France
- Team principal(s): Hugues de Chaunac
- Current series: FIA World Endurance Championship
- Former series: Formula 3000; French Supertouring Championship; French F3; FIA GT Championship; European Le Mans Series; American Le Mans Series; European F2; European Rally Championship
- Teams' Championships: 1997 FIA GT (GT2); 1998 FIA GT (GT2); 2007 LMS (GT1); 2010 LMS (LMP1)
- Drivers' Championships: 1975 European F2 (Laffite); 1977 European F2 (Arnoux); 1978 French F3 (Prost); 1979 French F3 (Prost); 1983 French F3 (Ferté); 1984 French F3 (Grouillard); 1985 French F3 (Raphanel); 1986 French F3 (Dalmas); 1987 French F3 (Alesi); 1988 French F3 (Comas); 1989 French F3 (Gounon); 2003-04 ERC (Jean-Joseph); 2004 SRC (Hevia); 2006 FFSA GT(Ayari/Hernandez); 2007 FFSA GT(Ayari/Narac); 2007 LMS (GT1) (Ayari/Ortelli); 2010 LMS (LMP1) (Sarrazin)
- Website: www.oreca.com

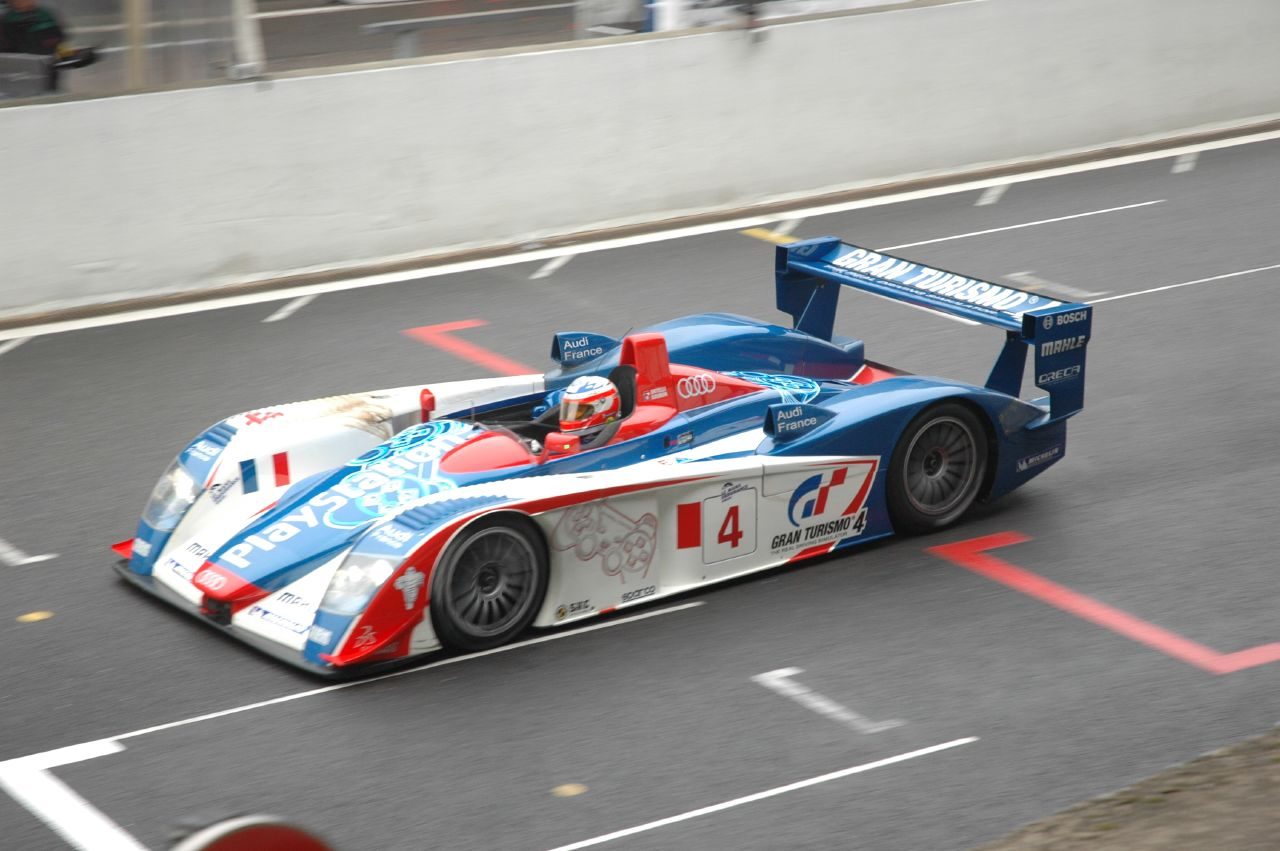
An Audi R8 used by Oreca in 2005.

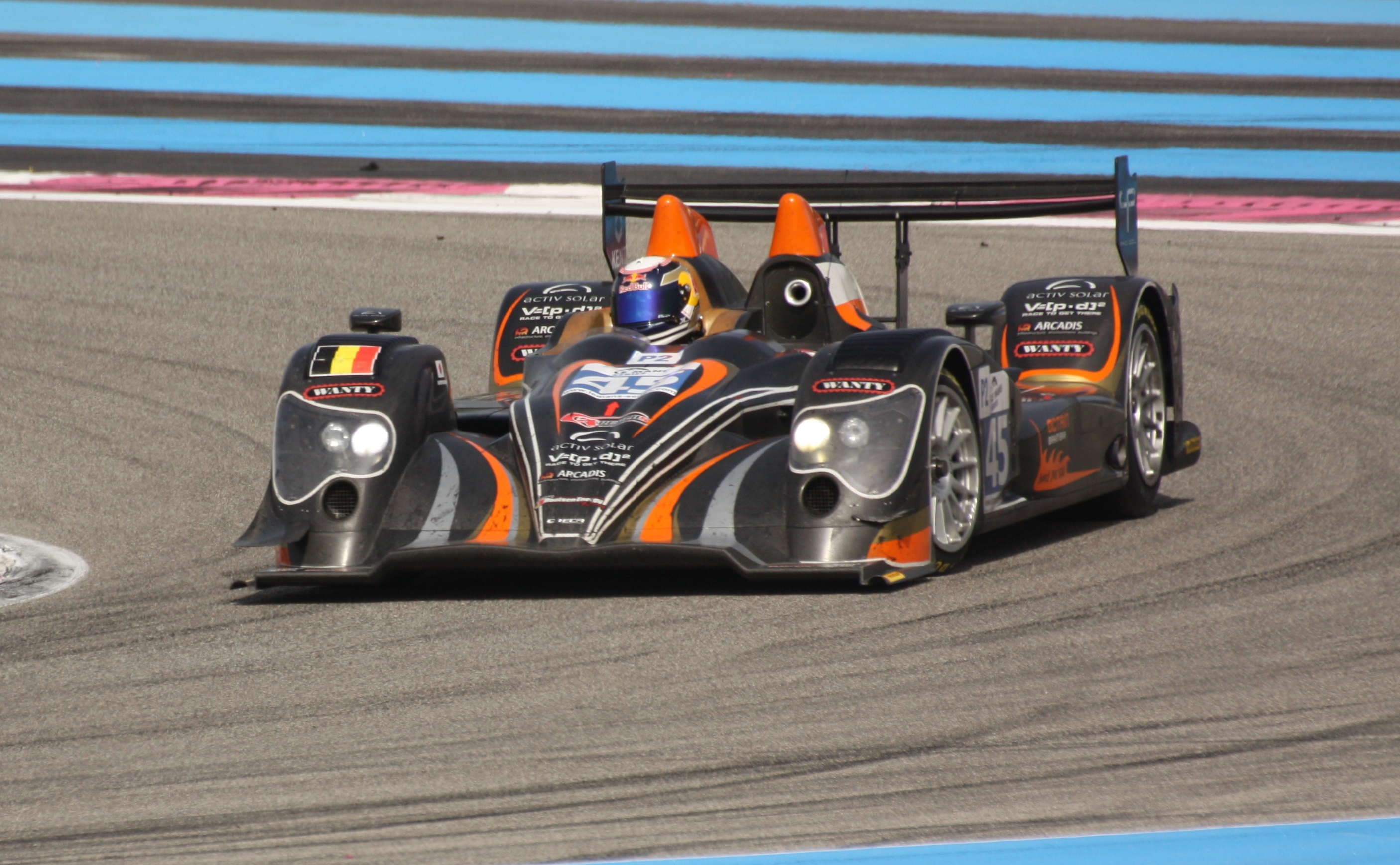
An Oreca 03-Nissan, raced by Boutsen Energy Racing at the 2011 6 Hours of Castellet.

ORECA (Organisation Exploitation Compétition Automobiles) is a French racing team and race car constructor, founded in 1973 and run by Hugues de Chaunac, former team manager of F1 team AGS. Oreca has had success in many areas of motorsport. Since the early 1990s, the team has concentrated on running sports cars and GT cars.

== Team ==
In the 1970s and 1980s, drivers including Alain Prost, Jacques Laffite and Jean Alesi won the French Formula Three Championship for the team a record 11 times.

In the 1990s, Oreca ran a BMW operation in the French Supertouring Championship. It also won the FIA GT Championship and the Le Mans 24 Hours in the GT2 class with a Chrysler Viper GTS-R and overall with a Mazda 787B in 1991, on their second attempt and first after a decade.

Also, the team prepared the Renault Clio S1600 for rallying and won the ice racing Andros Trophy with a Toyota Corolla driven by Alain Prost.

In the 2000s, Oreca assisted Renault Sport in building the new Mégane V6 for the Renault Eurocup Mégane Sport and fielding an Audi R8 in the 2005 Le Mans 24 Hours with support from Audi France. Also for 2006 Oreca ran the Saleen S7R in the Le Mans Series. The Oreca Saleen S7R had already won the 2006 Spa-Francorchamps Le Mans race.

Oreca worked closely with Dodge on the Dodge Viper Competition Coupe, producing well over 100 customer cars in the period 2006–2007 to GT3 specification.

Oreca entered a customer-specification Peugeot 908 HDi FAP with 'Semi-works' help for the 2010 Le Mans 24 Hours, as well as for the rest of the Le Mans Series races, taking overall honours at the Autódromo Internacional do Algarve and the overall championship ahead of the factory Peugeot teams.

In 2011, Oreca won the 12 Hours of Sebring race despite still using the Peugeot 908 HDi-FAP, a model retired at the end of the previous season.

In 2012 Oreca was selected to run the Toyota TS030 Hybrid LMP1 car with support from Toyota Motorsport GmbH in the FIA World Endurance Championship (including the 24 Hours of Le Mans). The car showed promising speed but did not finish at Le Mans due to a large crash involving one car and mechanical problems sidelining the other.

== Manufacturer ==
On September 14, 2007, Oreca announced their plans to purchase sports prototype manufacturer Courage Compétition. Its first project was the Oreca 01, made for the LMP1 class. It was first raced at the 2009 1000 km of Spa with two entries.

During 2009, Oreca started producing the Formula Le Mans 'FLM09'. This was initially run in its own series named the Formula Le Mans Cup until 2010 when it was adapted to allow it to be run three other endurance series including the American Le Mans Series which gave the car its own category (LMPC). The idea was to give an affordable platform for smaller teams to get into endurance racing.

The Oreca 03 was introduced in 2011 to meet the Automobile Club de l'Ouest (ACO)'s revised LMP2 regulations. Designed around a carbon-fibre monocoque and double-wishbone pushrod suspension, it was cost-capped and compatible with production-based V8 engines. Most customer teams opted for the Nissan VK45DE 4.5L, while others chose the Judd-BMW 3.6L V8.

Between 2011 and 2015, the Oreca 03 and its updated 03R variant accumulated over 60 race starts and secured more than 25 class wins across the European Le Mans Series, FIA World Endurance Championship, and the Asian Le Mans Series. Notable victories included wins at the 6 Hours of São Paulo and Shanghai with G-Drive Racing, and several ELMS titles with Thiriet by TDS Racing.

Several chassis are still active in historic racing under the Masters Endurance Legends series, both in Europe and the United States.

The Oreca 03 was launched to accommodate the new LMP2 regulations for 2011. In 2015, the Oreca 05 was unveiled, winning the LMP2 class at the 24 Hours of Le Mans.

Oreca was selected as one of the four 2017 LMP2 manufacturers, and launched the Oreca 07. Two variations of the 07 were also created to race in different classes, in the form of the Rebellion R13, created for the LMP1 class to race in the FIA World Endurance Championship, and the Acura ARX-05, created in partnership with Honda Performance Development for the Daytona Prototype international (DPi) regulations to race in the IMSA SportsCar Championship. The R13 was later taken by Alpine and rebadged as the A480 to race in the Le Mans Hypercar as a "grandfathered" entry. Oreca also won the tender for the 2028 LMP2 regulations.

Oreca was also selected as one of four chassis suppliers for the LMDh sports prototype regulations, and currently supplies Acura and Alpine with chassis for their respective ARX-06 and A424 race cars. They will also supply Genesis and Ford from 2026 and 2027 respectively.

== Models ==
| Year | Car | Engine | Image | Class |
|---|---|---|---|---|
| 2009 | Oreca 01 | AIM (Judd) YS5.5 5.5 L V10 | | LMP1 |
| 2009 | Oreca FLM 09 | General Motors LS3 6.2 L V8 | | LMPC |
| 2011 | Oreca 03 | Judd-BMW HK 3.6 L V8; Nissan VK45DE 4.5 L V8 | | LMP2 |
| 2014 | Rebellion R-One | Toyota RV8KLM 3.4 L V8; AER P60 2.4 L V6 | | LMP1-L |
| 2015 | Oreca 05 | Nissan VK45DE 4.5 L V8 | | LMP2 |
| 2017 | Oreca 07 | Gibson GK428 4.2 L V8 | | LMP2 |
| 2018 | Acura ARX-05 | Acura AR35TT 3.5L V6 | | DPi |
| 2018 | Oreca R4 kit | Oreca 1.6 L I4 | | Group R4 |
| 2018 | Rebellion R13 | Gibson GL458 4.5 L V8 | | LMP1 |
| 2021 | Alpine A480 | Gibson GL458 4.5 L V8 | | LMP1 |
| 2023 | Acura ARX-06 | Acura AR24e 2.4 L V6 | | LMDh |
| 2024 | Alpine A424 | Alpine V634 3.4 L V6 | | LMDh |
| 2026 | Genesis GMR-001 | Genesis G8MR 3.2 L V8 | | LMDh |
| 2027 | Ford LMDh | Ford Coyote 5.4 L V8 | | LMDh |
| 2028 | Oreca 09 | Gibson 3.4 L Turbo V6 | | LMP2 |
