= Oreca 09 =

LMP2 racing car

- Category: Le Mans Prototype 2 (LMP2)
- Constructor: Oreca
- Designers: Christophe Guibbal (Head of Design); Rémi Taffin (technical director)
- Predecessor: Oreca 07

Technical specifications
- Suspension (front): Double wishbone, push rod operated over damper
- Suspension (rear): Double wishbone, push rod operated over damper
- Engine: Gibson 3.4 L (3,400.0 cc; 207.5 cu in) V6 turbocharged mid-engined, longitudinally mounted
- Tyres: Goodyear

Competition history
- Notable entrants: (France) Duqueine Team (France) TDS Racing (United Kingdom) United Autosports

The Oreca 09 is an upcoming Le Mans Prototype built by French manufacturer Oreca to meet the 2028 FIA/ACO LMP2 regulations.
