= Oreca 07 =

Le Mans Prototype by French manufacturer Oreca

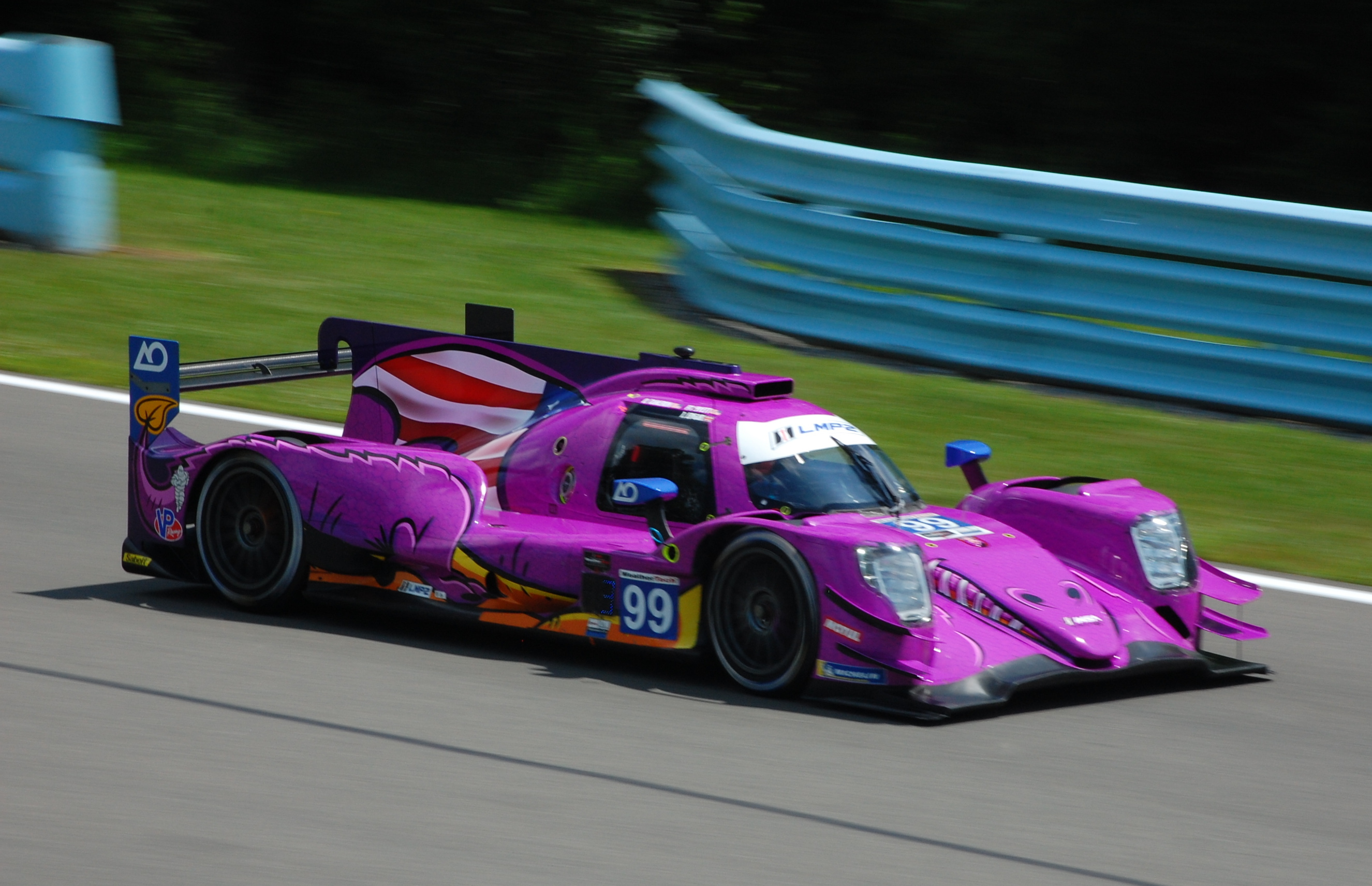
- The No. 99 Oreca 07 of AO Racing ("Spike the Dragon") at the 2025 Sahlen's Six Hours of The Glen
- Category: Le Mans Prototype 2
- Constructor: Oreca
- Designers: Christophe Guibbal (Head of Design, Oreca); David Floury (Technical Director); Jean-Philippe Pélaprat (Technology Engineer)
- Predecessor: Oreca 05
- Successor: Oreca 09

Technical specifications
- Chassis: Carbon fibre monocoque
- Suspension (front): Double wishbone, push rod operated over damper
- Suspension (rear): Double wishbone, push rod operated over damper
- Length: 4,745 mm (186.8 in)
- Width: 1,895 mm (74.6 in)
- Height: 1,045 mm (41.1 in)
- Axle track: front 1,570 mm (61.8 in) rear 1,550 mm (61.0 in)
- Wheelbase: 3,005 mm (118.3 in)
- Engine: Gibson GK428 4.2-litre naturally aspirated V8 mid-engined, longitudinally mounted
- Transmission: Xtrac P1159C 6-speed sequential manual
- Power: 603 hp (2017–2020); 536 hp (2021–present)
- Weight: 930 kg (2,050 lb)
- Fuel: Total; VP Racing Fuels
- Lubricants: Motul; Pennzoil
- Tyres: Michelin; Dunlop/Goodyear; Continental

Competition history
- Notable entrants: Oreca 07: (Italy) AF Corse (Portugal) Algarve Pro Racing (France) Alpine Elf Team (Slovakia) ARC Bratislava (Switzerland) Cool Racing (Luxembourg) DKR Engineering (United States) DragonSpeed (France) Duqueine Engineering (United States) Era Motorsport (France) Graff (France) IDEC Sport (Poland) Inter Europol Competition (United Kingdom) Jota (United Kingdom) Nielsen Racing (Italy) Prema Racing (Germany) Proton Competition (United States) PR1/Mathiasen Motorsports (United States) Starworks Motorsport (France) TDS Racing (Canada) Tower Motorsports (United Kingdom) United Autosports (United Kingdom) Vector Sport (Poland) Team Virage (Belgium) Team WRT (United Kingdom) BHK Motorsport (China) CEFC Manor TRS Racing (Russia) G-Drive Racing (Denmark) High Class Racing (China) Jackie Chan DC Racing (Japan) K2 Uchino Racing (Belgium) Mühlner Motorsport (France) Panis Barthez Competition (Germany) Phoenix Racing (Netherlands) Racing Team Nederland; Racing Team India (United Kingdom) RLR Msport (United States) Team Penske (France) Ultimate (Switzerland) Vaillante Rebellion (United Kingdom) 99 Racing Alpine A470: (France) Signatech Alpine Elf Aurus 01: (Russia) G-Drive Racing
- Debut: 2017 24 Hours of Daytona
- First win: 2017 4 Hours of Monza
- Last win: 2026 4 Hours of Portimão
- Last event: 2026 4 Hours of Portimão
Races	Wins	Podiums	Poles
184	162	490	159
- Teams' Championships: 41 (2017 ELMS, 2017 FIA WEC, 2018 ELMS, 2018–19 FIA WEC, 2019 ELMS, 2019 IMSA SCC, 2019–20 Asian LMS, 2019–20 FIA WEC, 2020 ELMS, 2020 IMSA SCC, 2021 Asian LMS, 2021 Asian LMS (P2 Am), 2021 ELMS, 2021 ELMS (LMP2 Pro-Am), 2021 FIA WEC, 2021 FIA WEC (LMP2 Pro-Am), 2021 IMSA SCC, 2022 Asian LMS, 2022 Asian LMS (P2 Am), 2022 ELMS, 2022 ELMS (LMP2 Pro-Am), 2022 FIA WEC, 2022 FIA WEC (LMP2 Pro-Am), 2022 IMSA SCC, 2023 Asian LMS, 2023 ELMS, 2023 ELMS (LMP2 Pro-Am), 2023 FIA WEC, 2023 IMSA SCC, 2023-24 Asian LMS, 2024 ELMS, 2024 ELMS (LMP2 Pro-Am), 2024 IMSA SCC, 2024-25 Asian LMS, 2025 ELMS, 2025 ELMS (LMP2 Pro-Am), 2025 IMSA SCC, 2025-26 Asian LMS, 2026 IMSA SCC, 2026 ELMS, 2026 ELMS (LMP2 Pro-Am)
- Drivers' Championships: 41 (2017 ELMS, 2017 FIA WEC, 2018 ELMS, 2018–19 FIA WEC, 2019 ELMS, 2019 IMSA SCC, 2019–20 Asian LMS, 2019–20 FIA WEC, 2020 ELMS, 2020 IMSA SCC, 2021 Asian LMS, 2021 Asian LMS (P2 Am), 2021 ELMS, 2021 ELMS (LMP2 Pro-Am), 2021 FIA WEC, 2021 FIA WEC (LMP2 Pro-Am), 2021 IMSA SCC, 2022 Asian LMS, 2022 Asian LMS (P2 Am), 2022 ELMS, 2022 ELMS (LMP2 Pro-Am), 2022 FIA WEC, 2022 FIA WEC (LMP2 Pro-Am), 2022 IMSA SCC, 2023 Asian LMS, 2023 ELMS, 2023 ELMS (LMP2 Pro-Am), 2023 FIA WEC, 2023 IMSA SCC, 2023-24 Asian LMS, 2024 ELMS, 2024 ELMS (LMP2 Pro-Am), 2024 IMSA SCC, 2024-25 Asian LMS, 2025 ELMS, 2025 ELMS (LMP2 Pro-Am), 2025 IMSA SCC, 2025-26 Asian LMS, 2026 IMSA SCC, 2026 ELMS, 2026 ELMS (LMP2 Pro-Am)

The Oreca 07 is a Le Mans Prototype built by French manufacturer Oreca designed under the 2017 FIA/ACO LMP2 regulations. It is the most successful LMP2 designed sports car platform of all time, with over 100 recorded victories and several major class championships since its launch. The car is the successor to the Oreca 05 and is set to be succeeded by the Oreca 09 to meet the 2028 FIA/ACO LMP2 regulations.

Its performance and reliability versus rival LMP2 sports cars has allowed the 07 to become the de facto number one option for prospective racing teams, finding more buyers every year since its launch, including those switching away from other brands. Since launching in 2017, nearly all teams competing in series featuring an LMP2 class or similar have used the 07. Over 100 Oreca 07s have been developed in-house.

== Development ==
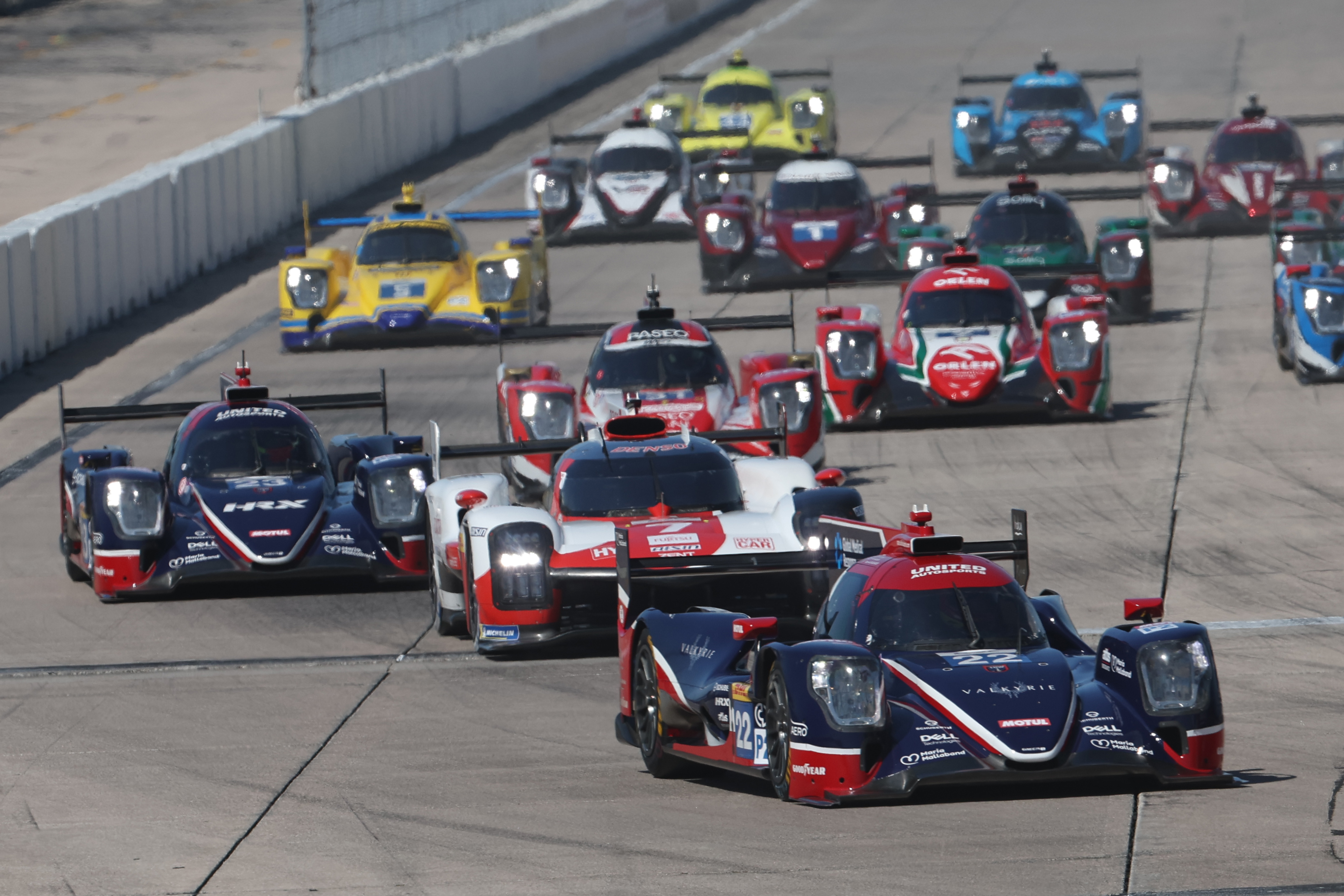
A field of Oreca 07 sports cars racing with a Toyota GR010 Hybrid at the 2022 1000 Miles of Sebring.

Research and development for the 07 traces back to its predecessor, the Oreca 05, which was future-proofed in preparation for the new 2017 LMP2 technical regulations. Using data collected from the 05's performance, Oreca decided to develop a new car based on the predecessor, with the goal of maximizing performance by focusing on energy and resource usage. The team opted to use this strategy not only to build a car based on a proven platform, but also to allow teams to update their Oreca 05 race cars within financial reason. A running prototype of the 07 was ready for testing at Circuit Paul Ricard in late October 2016. First impressions were positive, meeting Oreca's targets set during simulation tests; technical director David Floury expressed optimism with the car's potential.

Design of the Oreca 07 was completed by Floury, Head of Design Christophe Guibbal, and Technology Engineer Jean-Philippe Pélaprat. The chassis of the 07 is built on the monocoque of the 05, with its aerodynamic design prioritizing conditioning and accelerating airflow through the sidepods and toward the diffuser, rather than generating large amounts of downforce directly at the nose. The suspension is a double wishbone push-rod package; the front uses torsion bars, and the rear uses coilovers. As per the regulations, it weighs 930 kg (2,050 lb) and comes equipped with a 4.2-litre Gibson GK428 V8 engine producing 600 hp (450 kW; 610 PS) mated to a six-speed Xtrac P1159C sequential manual. In 2020, power output was decreased by 60 hp after applying a 35 mm air restrictor and a lower redline following the announcement of the Le Mans Hypercar regulations, although horsepower was later increased by 40 hp in the European Le Mans Series, where LMP2 competes as the premier class.

As a result of Oreca's development direction, the 07 quickly became the most dominant car in its class. It has since remained a viable platform, with Oreca continuing to receive healthy demand for the 07, including from teams switching from rival brands. The 100th chassis, technically the 99th due to skipping the number 13, was delivered to Cool Racing for the 2022 24 Hours of Le Mans and later displayed at Oreca's showroom. The figure includes every variant of the 07, including chassis for the Acura ARX-05, update kits for the Oreca 05, and re-badged Alpine and Aurus cars, though it does not include the LMP1 variant, the Rebellion R13.

== Racing history ==
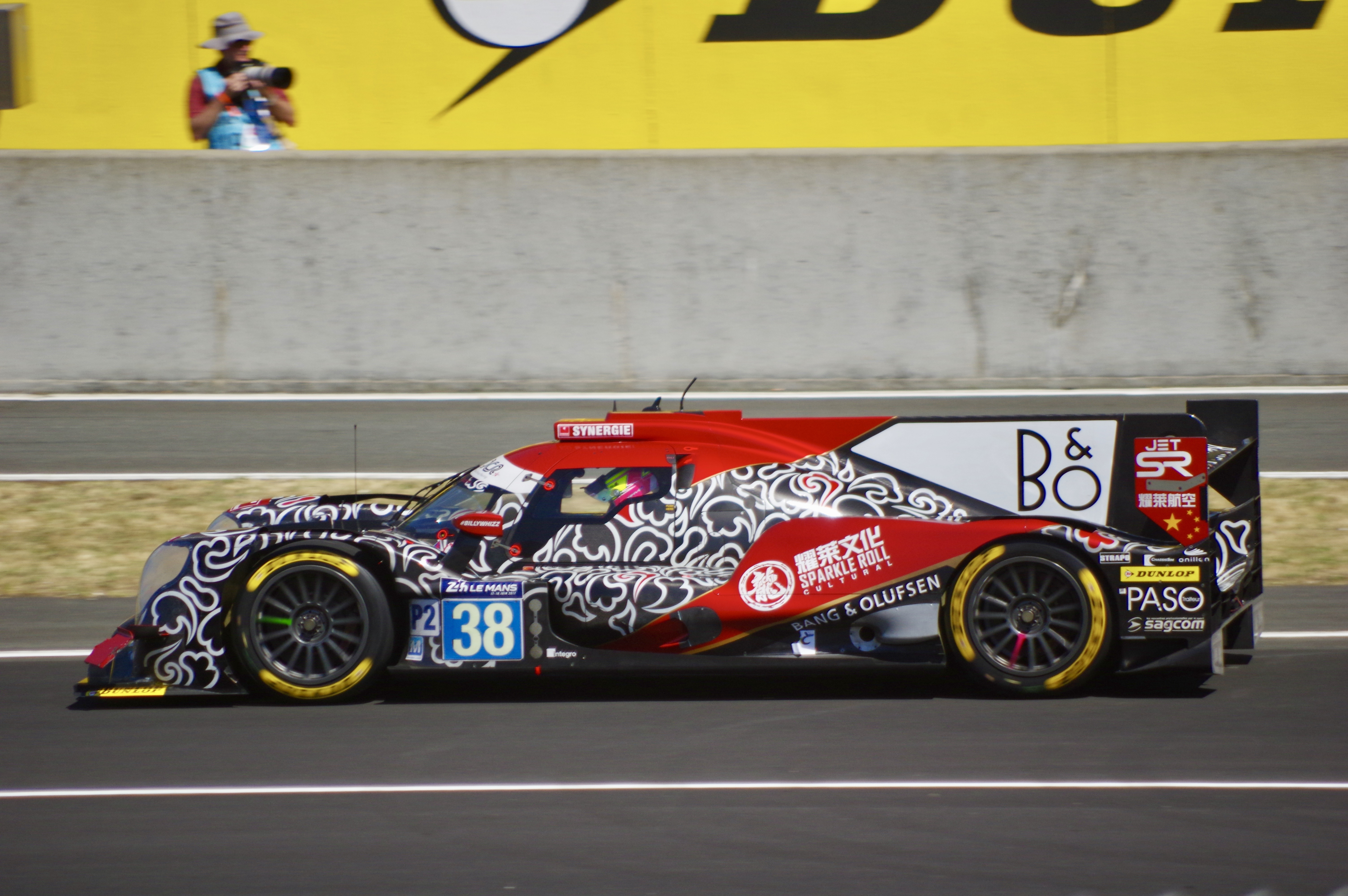
The No. 38 Oreca 07 of Jackie Chan DC Racing that briefly led the 2017 24 Hours of Le Mans before finishing 2nd overall.

Alongside its fellow debutants utilizing the updated LMP2 rule set, the 07 debuted at the 2017 24 Hours of Daytona. It would take its first win at the 2017 4 Hours of Monza.

In the 2017 24 Hours of Le Mans, it became the first LMP2 sports car to lead the annual endurance event, when Jackie Chan DC Racing's No. 38 entry inherited the lead in the 21st hour with five of the six LMP1 cars running into trouble over the course of the race. They nearly secured an upset victory before repairs allowed Porsche's No. 2 919 Hybrid LMP1 car to reclaim the lead with an hour remaining. Oreca finished with a historic double podium in 2nd and 3rd, courtesy of DC Racing's performance.

The car's significant performance advantage on the field over the course of the 2017 calendar year prompted the Automobile Club de l'Ouest to allow the rival LMP2 brands, Dallara, Ligier, and Riley/Multimatic, to create extensive upgrade packages to match the Oreca 07 while freezing Oreca's own vehicle development, much to Oreca's disapproval. Despite such attempts, the Oreca 07 continued to succeed as a chassis and remain a favoured option for prospective teams looking to enter the LMP2 class. The 07 is currently used by all participating LMP2 teams in the IMSA SportsCar Championship, European Le Mans Series, and Asian Le Mans Series.

Since 2017, the Oreca 07 has achieved numerous victories, including winning every year in the LMP2 class of the 24 Hours of Le Mans, and has won nearly every class championship available in the FIA World Endurance Championship, IMSA SportsCar Championship, European Le Mans Series, and Asian Le Mans Series.

== Variations ==
=== Acura ARX-05 ===
A DPi variation of the prototype, the Acura ARX-05, was created for IMSA's WeatherTech SportsCar Championship. The car was developed through a partnership between Honda Performance Development and Oreca. The powerplant of the vehicle is a production-based 3.5-litre Acura AR35TT twin-turbocharged V6. Other alterations from the 07 include Acura-specific bodywork.

From 2018 to 2020, Team Penske entered a pair of ARX-05s, winning the title in the latter two seasons. For 2021 and 2022, Wayne Taylor Racing and Meyer Shank Racing each campaigned one of the ARX-05s previously run by Penske. The ARX-05 was succeeded by the Acura ARX-06 in 2023 following the series' switch to the new Hypercar regulations.

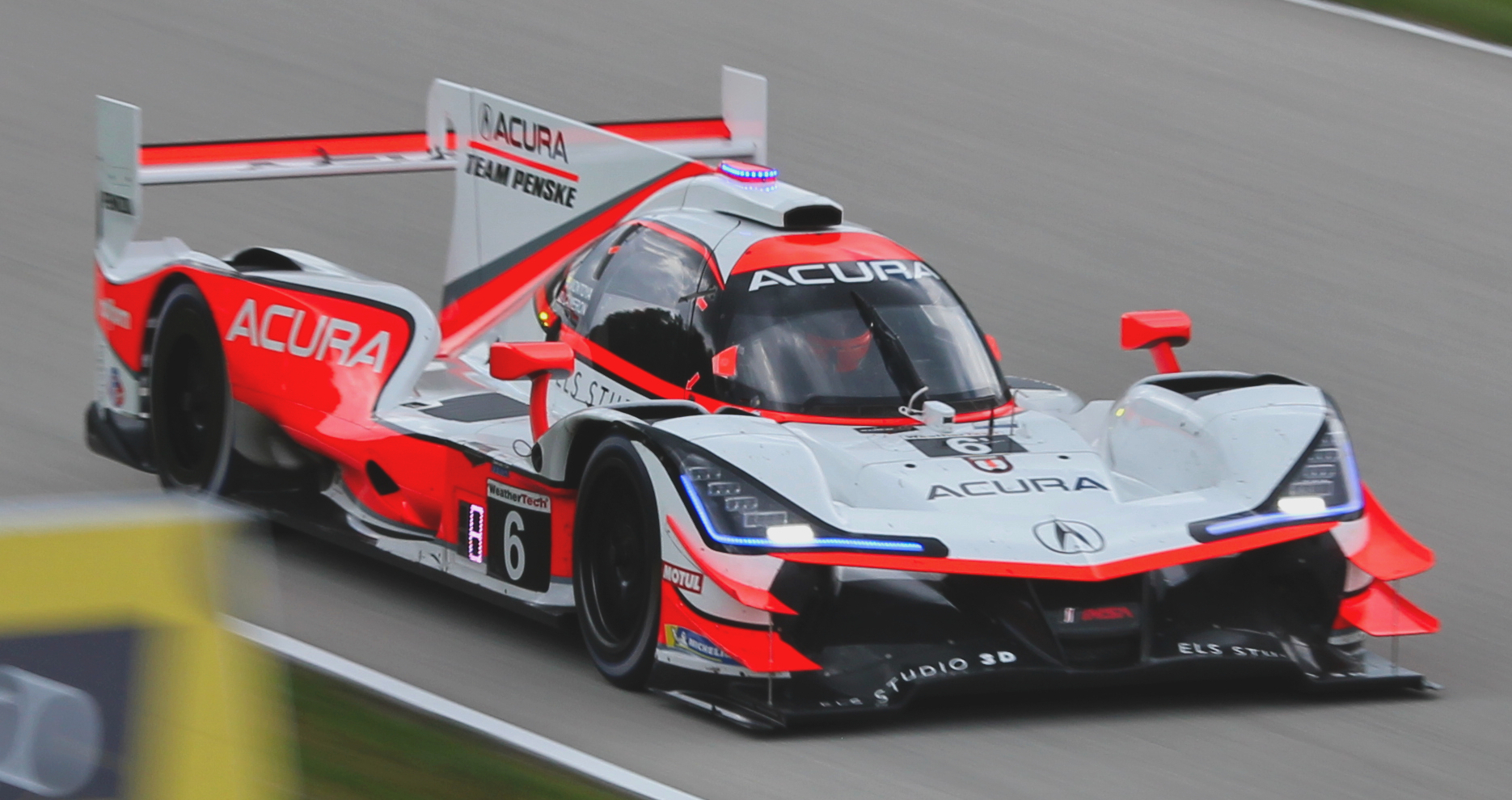
Team Penske's Acura ARX-05 in the 2020 IMSA SportsCar Weekend.

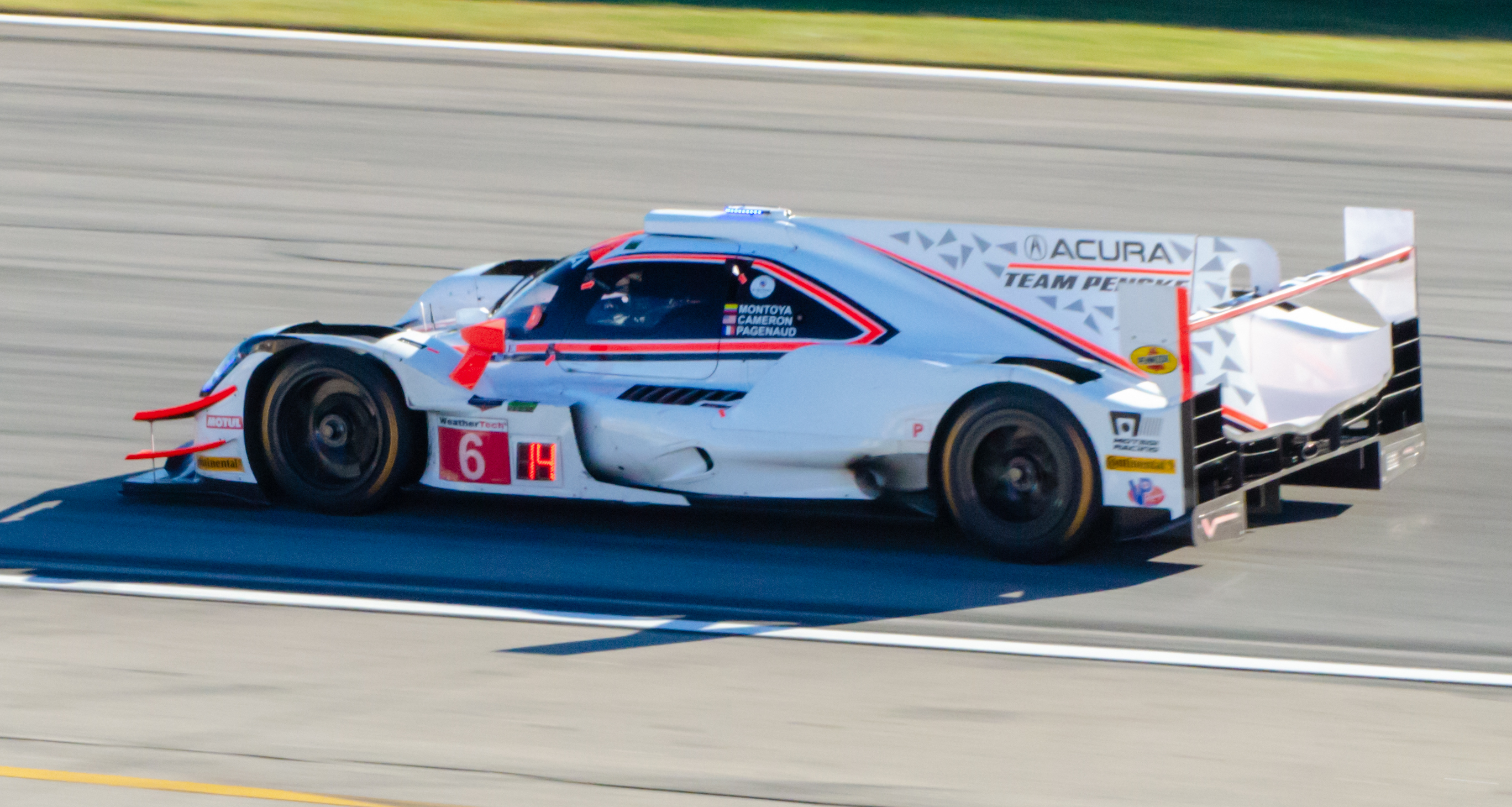
Rear view of the Acura ARX-05, driven in the 2018 Petit Le Mans.

=== Alpine A470 ===
Ahead of the 2017 FIA World Endurance Championship, Alpine unveiled the A470 to race with alongside Signatech. It carries Alpine branding, but remains internally identical to its Oreca 07 base. It is the successor to the Alpine A460, which itself was also based on a preexisting Oreca chassis. Alpine raced with the A470 for four years, winning the 2018–19 FIA World Endurance Trophy for LMP2 Teams with Nicolas Lapierre, André Negrão, and Pierre Thiriet. Alpine moved to the new Hypercar class in 2021 using a grandfathered and rebadged Rebellion R13 LMP1 car, which itself was a variant of the 07.

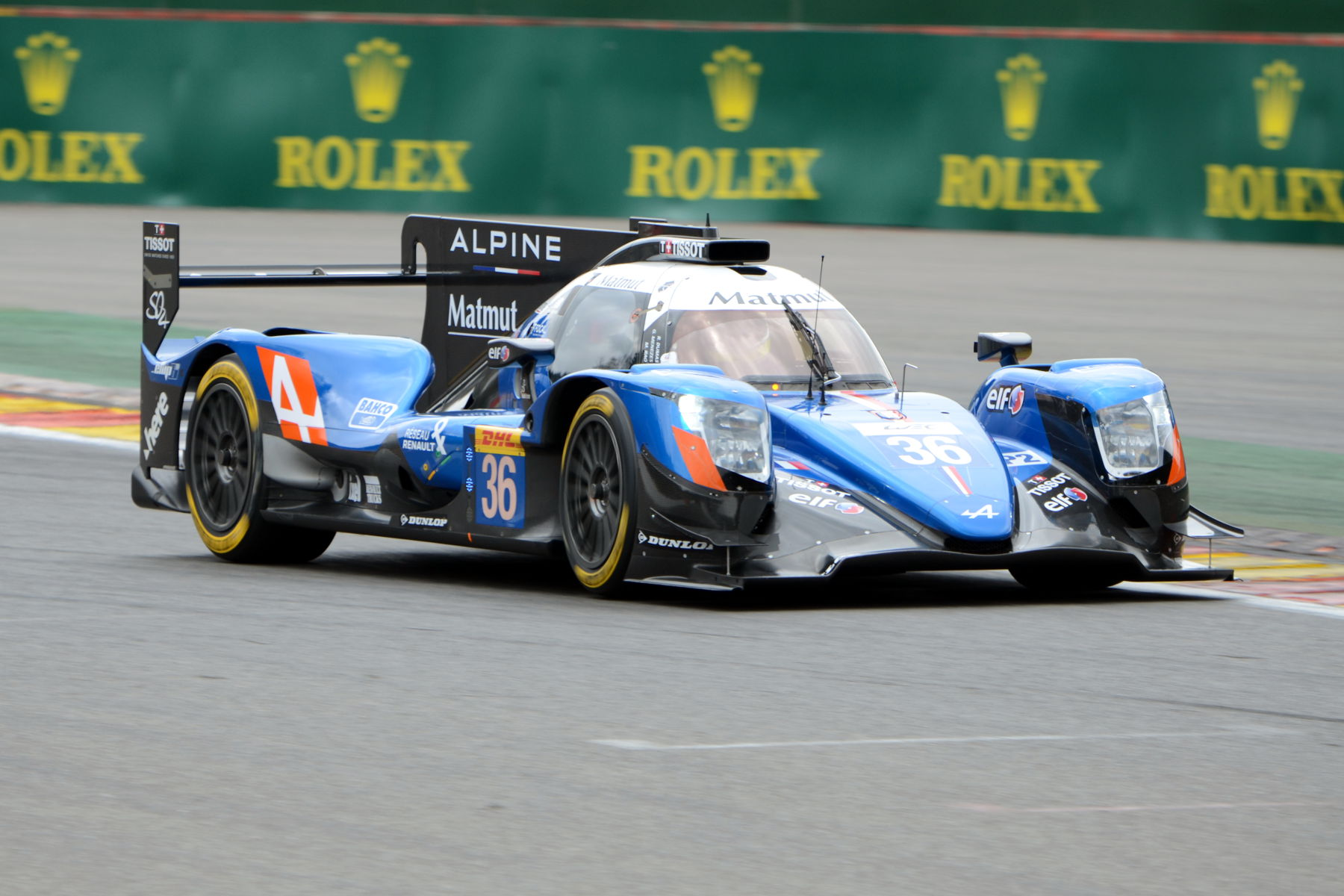
Signatech's Alpine A470 in the 2017 6 Hours of Spa-Francorchamps.

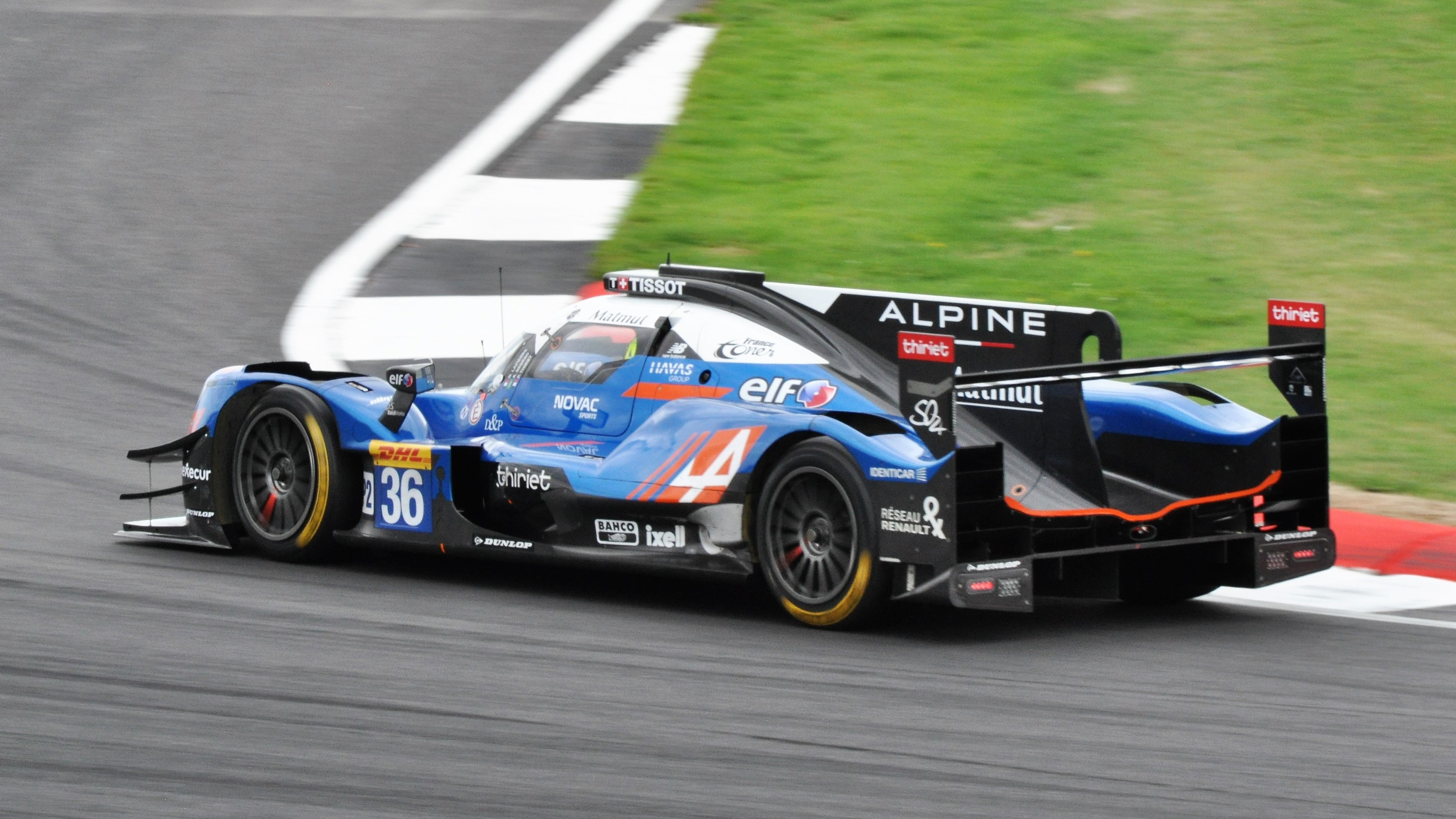
Rear view of the Alpine A470, driven in the 2018 6 Hours of Silverstone.

=== Aurus 01 ===
Russian manufacturer Aurus Motors entered a partnership with G-Drive Racing in 2019 to compete in the European Le Mans Series using a rebranded Oreca 07, known as the Aurus 01. The 01 carries Aurus branding, but is technically identical to the Oreca 07, using the same chassis and internals. G-Drive and Aurus raced the 01 for three years, scoring four victories, before withdrawing amid sanctions from the FIA following the Russian invasion of Ukraine.

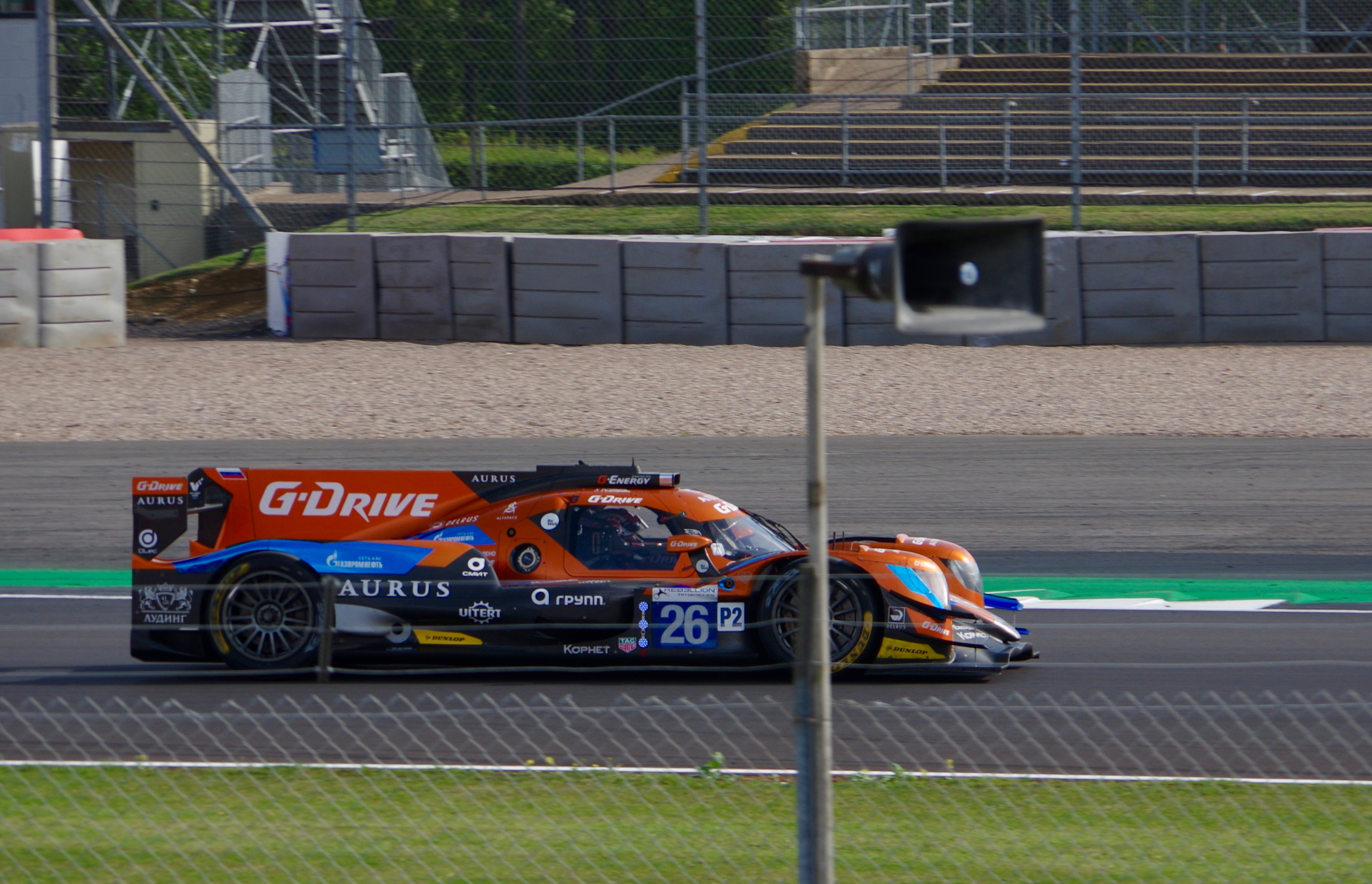
G-Drive Racing's No. 26 Aurus 01 in the 2019 4 Hours of Silverstone.

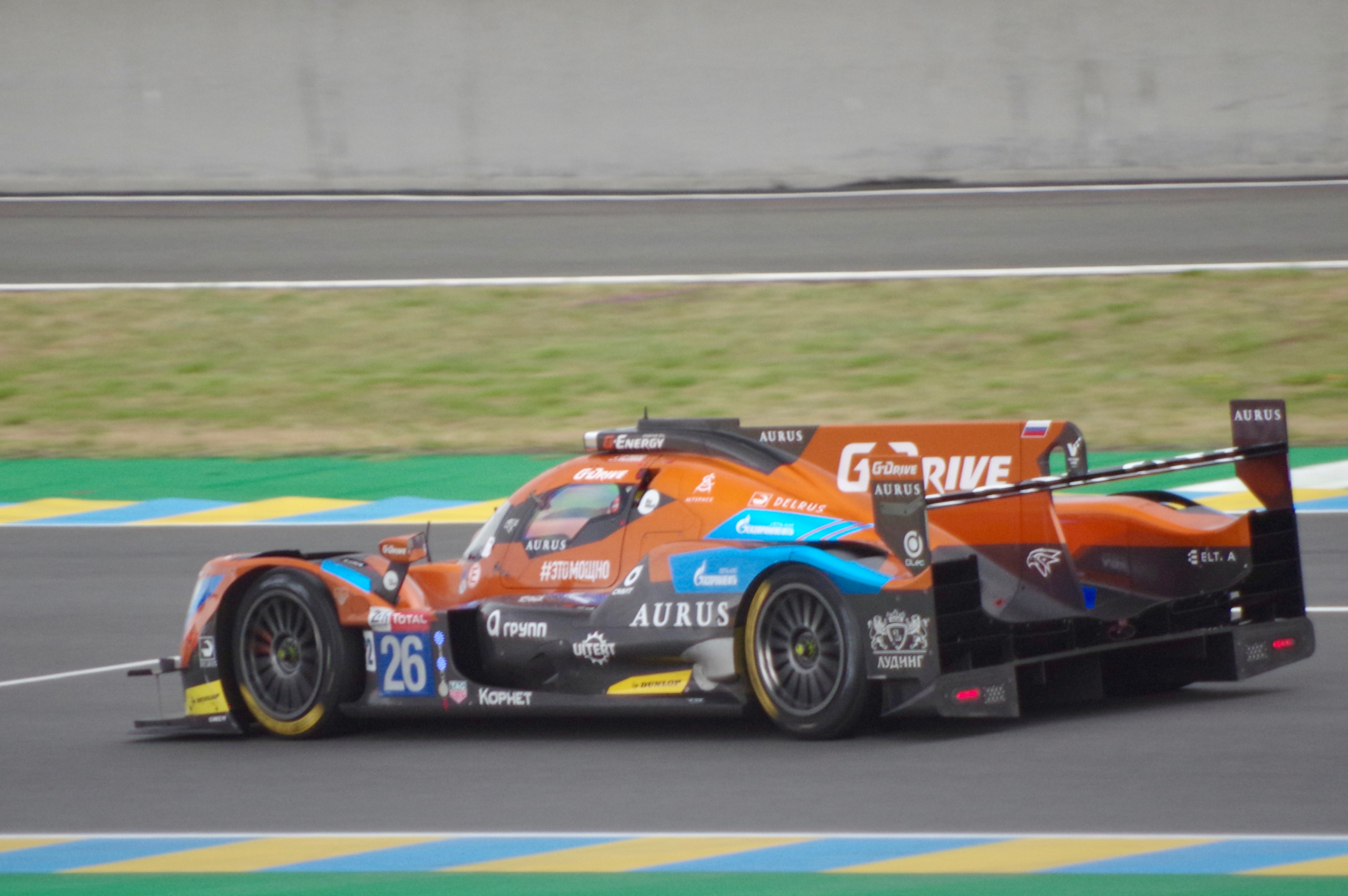
Rear view of the Aurus 01, driven in the 2019 24 Hours of Le Mans.

=== Rebellion R13/Alpine A480 ===
The Rebellion R13 was a variant of the Oreca 07, built by Oreca on behalf of Swiss-based team Rebellion Racing to race in the LMP1 class. It would later be renamed by Alpine to the Alpine A480 when it was re-badged to run in grandfathered condition in the Hypercar class in 2021 and 2022. Both the R13 and A480 routinely competed against Toyota in four seasons of competition for the overall FIA World Endurance Championship titles, finishing in 2nd overall in all four occasions across both iterations. The renamed A480 variant was succeeded by the Alpine A424 two years later.

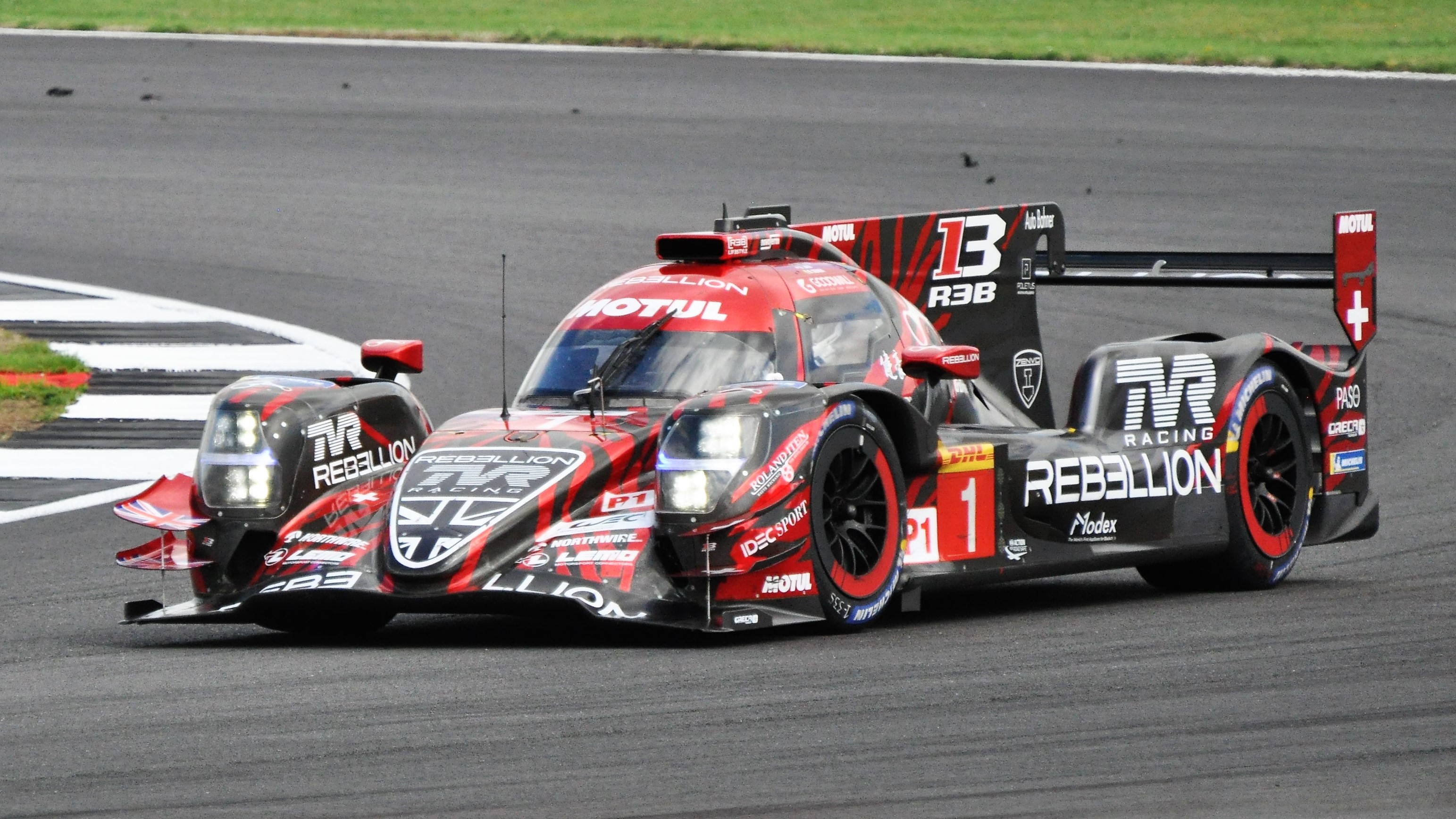
André Lotterer in the Rebellion R13 in the 2018 6 Hours of Silverstone.

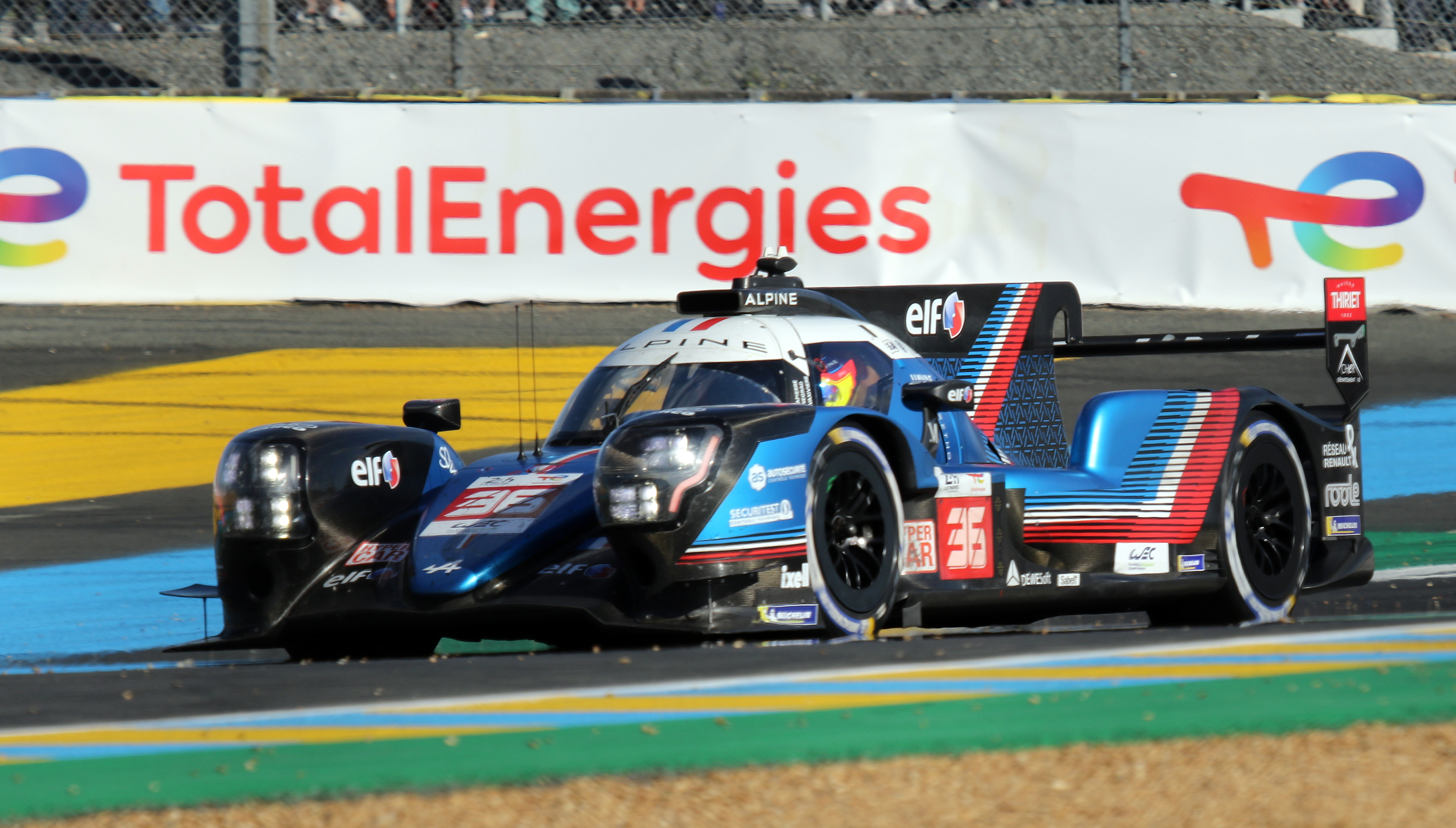
The renamed car, known as the Alpine A480 in the 2022 24 Hours of Le Mans.
