= 2024 Qatar 1812 km =

Endurance sportscar racing event

2024 Qatar Airways Qatar 1812 km
Event information
- Round 1 of 8 in the 2024 FIA World Endurance Championship
- Date: 2 March 2024
- Location: Lusail
- Venue: Losail International Circuit
- Duration: 335 laps

Results
- Laps completed: 335
- Distance (km): 1815.365
- Distance (miles): 1127.945
- Hypercar

Pole position
- Time: 1:39.347
- Team: (Germany) Porsche Penske Motorsport
- Drivers: (Australia) Matt Campbell

Winners
- Team: (Germany) Porsche Penske Motorsport
- Drivers: (France) Kévin Estre (Germany) André Lotterer (Belgium) Laurens Vanthoor
- LMGT3

Winners
- Team: (Lithuania) Manthey PureRxcing
- Drivers: (Austria) Klaus Bachler (Saint Kitts and Nevis) Alex Malykhin (Germany) Joel Sturm

The 2024 Qatar 1812 km (formally known as the 2024 Qatar Airways Qatar 1812 km) was an endurance sportscar racing event, held on 2 March 2024, as the first of eight rounds of the 2024 FIA World Endurance Championship. It was the inaugural running of the event.

== Background ==
The event was announced on 9 June 2023, during the 2023 24 Hours of Le Mans weekend. The race, which was the first for the FIA World Endurance Championship in Qatar, was set to run for 1812 kilometres, and if this distance was not met, a maximum of 10 hours. The number 1812 is a reference to the country's national day.

This was also the first event in FIA World Endurance Championship history without participation of both the LMP2 and LMGTE classes. LMP2 was axed due to an increase in demand for grid slots in the Hypercar category. LMGTE Am, however, was replaced by the new LMGT3 class, which features largely the same idea as standard GT3 cars, but with a voluntary bodywork conversion kit. Furthermore, torque sensors are placed on all cars for monitoring of powertrain performance. The class runs with a Pro/Am driver structure.

=== Balance of Performance ===
On 16 February 2024, the FIA published the balance of performance (BoP) for the Hypercar and LMGT3 classes.

==== Hypercar ====
In Hypercar, all nine cars received base weight, power, and energy values, which will be evaluated during the season. Furthermore, the FIA tested a so-called 'Power gain' mechanism for the hypercars during the Prologue, where each car will receive a certain percentage of extra power after reaching a speed of 210 km/h (130 mph). However, this feature was not used during the Qatar race itself, but it may be used from the Imola event onwards. Additionally, the hybrid system deployment speed for the LMH cars stayed the same: 150 km/h (93 mph) for the Peugeot, and 190 km/h (120 mph) for the Ferrari, Isotta Fraschini, and Toyota.

The Alpine had a weight of 1070 kilograms (kg) during the event, with a maximum power output of 510 kilowatts (kW) and a maximum stint energy of 909 megajoules (MJ). The BMW was 10 kg lighter than the Alpine, bringing its weight down to 1060 kg, with a maximum power output of 506 kW and a maximum stint energy of 904 MJ. For the Cadillac, the FIA added 2 kg of ballast to the minimum weight, totalling to 1032 kg, with 499 kW of power and 890 MJ of stint energy. The 2023 24 Hours of Le Mans-winning Ferrari cars weighed 1075 kg, with 503 kW of power and 902 MJ of energy. The new Isotta Fraschini received a total of 55 kg of ballast, bringing it up to 1085 kg, with 514 kW of power and the highest maximum stint energy of all manufacturers: 917 MJ. The Lamborghini, another new car, had a weight of 1041 kg, a power output of 502 kW and 895 MJ of energy. The Peugeot received no ballast, keeping its weight of 1030 kg, with the highest power of all: 520 kW. Additionally, they had 904 MJ of energy. The Porsche had a weight of 1048 kg, 505 kW of power, and 900 MJ of energy. Lastly, the defending champion Toyota had the heaviest car, 1089 kg, with 510 kW of power and 914 MJ of energy.

==== LMGT3 ====
For the first ever LMGT3 event, the power gain mechanism was used. Each car received a positive or negative power gain after reaching 200 km/h (120 mph). Furthermore, all cars received base weight, power gain, and energy values, which will be evaluated during the season. A difference with the Hypercar class is that LMGT3 weight values will be evaluated per car instead of per manufacturer. All cars received a minimum ride height of 50 millimeters.

The Aston Martin had a weight of 1318 kg, an additional power gain of 2.0%, and 689 MJ of energy. The BMW weighed 1321 kg, received an additional power gain of 1.0%, and 687 MJ of energy. For the Corvette, the weight will be 1331 kg, with no additional power gain, and 685 MJ of energy. The Ferrari also weighed 1331 kg, but had a negative power gain, namely -1.0%. It also received 678 MJ of energy. The new Ford had a weight of 1326 kg, with a power gain of 2.0%, and 696 MJ of energy. For the Lamborghini, the weight was set at 1332 kg, with the biggest power decrease after 200 km/h: -4.0%. Their stint energy was set at 676 MJ. The Lexus, with a weight of 1345 kg, was the heaviest of them all. Furthermore, they received a power decrease of -1.0%, and 698 MJ of energy. The McLaren had a weight of 1327 kg, no power gain and 684 MJ of energy. Finally, the Porsche was the lightest car, with a weight of 1315 kg. They received a power gain of 1.0%, and 685 MJ of energy.

== Entry list ==
The entry list was revealed on 13 February 2024, and includes 19 entries in the Hypercar category, and 18 entries in the new LMGT3 category. BMW, Alpine, Lamborghini, and Isotta Fraschini have all entered their new hypercars for the opening event. However, Glickenhaus and Vanwall were not able to get a spot on the full-season Hypercar entry list, the former having announced the cessation of their WEC program before the season ended.

In LMGT3, Aston Martin, BMW, Chevrolet, Ferrari, Ford, Lamborghini, Lexus, McLaren, and Porsche were able to secure a full-season entries, fielding two cars each. Each team is required to field at least one bronze driver towards the Pro/Am class structure.

== Schedule ==
| Date | Time (local: AST) | Event |
|---|---|---|
| Thursday, 29 February | 12:20 | Free Practice 1 |
| Thursday, 29 February | 17:30 | Free Practice 2 |
| Friday, 1 March | 11:00 | Free Practice 3 |
| Friday, 1 March | 16:00 | Qualifying - LMGT3 |
| Friday, 1 March | 16:20 | Qualifying - Hypercar |
| Friday, 1 March | 16:40 | Hyperpole - LMGT3 |
| Friday, 1 March | 16:58 | Hyperpole - Hypercar |
| Saturday, 2 March | 11:00 | Race |

== Practice ==
There were three practice sessions preceding the start of the race on Saturday: two on Thursday and one on Friday. The session on Thursday morning was scheduled to be run for 90 minutes, but ended three minutes early due to a red flag. The Thursday afternoon session was scheduled for 90 minutes, but also ended a few minutes early due to a red flag. The final session on Friday lasted 60 minutes.

=== Practice 1 ===
The first practice session took place at 12:20 PM AST on Thursday and ended with Matt Campbell being fastest in the No. 5 Porsche Penske Motorsport, with a lap time of 1:42.486. James Calado was second fastest in the No. 51 Ferrari AF Corse entry followed by Kévin Estre in the No. 6 Porsche. Nico Pino was fastest in LMGT3 with a lap time of 1:55.824, followed by Alessio Rovera in the No. 55 Vista AF Corse Ferrari, and Davide Rigon in the No. 54 Ferrari. The session was red flagged a total of three times. The first stoppage was for IT problems in the race control center, and the second stoppage was for a photographer in a dangerous area. The final stoppage came with three minutes to go, when Raffaele Marciello beached his No. 15 BMW M Team WRT BMW in the gravel, ending the session early.

| Class | No. | Entrant | Driver | Time |
|---|---|---|---|---|
| Hypercar | 5 | (Germany) Porsche Penske Motorsport | (Australia) Matt Campbell | 1:42.486 |
| LMGT3 | 95 | (United Kingdom) United Autosports | (Chile) Nico Pino | 1:55.824 |

- Note: Only the fastest car in each class is shown.

=== Practice 2 ===
The second practice session took place at 5:30 PM AST on Thursday. Kévin Estre was fastest in the No. 6 Porsche Penske Motorsport entry with a lap time of 1:39.990. Second-quickest was Jean-Éric Vergne in the No. 93 Peugeot TotalEnergies entry, with Jenson Button's No. 38 Hertz Team Jota Porsche in third. Simon Mann was fastest in LMGT3 in the No. 55 Vista AF Corse Ferrari, with a lap time of 1:55.190. Francesco Castellacci was second in the No. 54 Ferrari, with Sean Gelael in the No. 31 BMW M Team WRT BMW in third. The session saw two red flags. The first red flag came after Jean-Karl Vernay beached the No. 11 Isotta Fraschini entry in the gravel at turn 6. The second stoppage came after Mirko Bortolotti's No. 63 Lamborghini Iron Lynx Lamborghini suddenly stopped with nine minutes to go, after which the session was not resumed.

| Class | No. | Entrant | Driver | Time |
|---|---|---|---|---|
| Hypercar | 6 | (Germany) Porsche Penske Motorsport | (France) Kévin Estre | 1:39.990 |
| LMGT3 | 55 | (Italy) Vista AF Corse | (United States) Simon Mann | 1:55.190 |

- Note: Only the fastest car in each class is shown.

=== Final practice ===
The third and final practice session took place at 11:00 AM AST on Friday, with Alex Lynn being fastest in the No. 2 Cadillac Racing Cadillac, with a lap time of 1:40.667. Matt Campbell was second in the No. 5 Porsche Penske Motorsport entry, followed by Callum Ilott in the No. 12 Hertz Team Jota Porsche. Alex Riberas was fastest in LMGT3 in the No. 27 Heart of Racing Team Aston Martin, setting a lap time of 1:54.964. In second was Davide Rigon in the No. 54 Vista AF Corse Ferrari, with team-mate Simon Mann in the No. 55 Ferrari in third. The session saw one stoppage after fifteen minutes, when James Cottingham got his No. 59 United Autosports McLaren stuck in the gravel in turn 5.

| Class | No. | Entrant | Driver | Time |
|---|---|---|---|---|
| Hypercar | 2 | (United States) Cadillac Racing | (United Kingdom) Alex Lynn | 1:40.667 |
| LMGT3 | 27 | (United States) Heart of Racing Team | (Spain) Alex Riberas | 1:54.964 |

- Note: Only the fastest car in each class is shown.

== Qualifying ==
For the first time in WEC history, the Hyperpole format was used at all races, instead of at Le Mans only. In this format, both classes get a 12-minute session, after which the top 10 fastest cars advance to the Hyperpole round. The Hyperpole session lasts 10 minutes, and decides the car starting from pole position.

Qualifying started at 4:00 PM AST on Friday. The first two sessions were for LMGT3 cars and Hypercars, respectively, after which the top 10 in each class would advance to Hyperpole. The first Hyperpole session was for LMGT3 cars. Tom van Rompuy was the fastest in the No. 81 TF Sport Corvette, with a time of 1:54.372. Second was Alex Malykhin in the No. 92 Manthey PureRxcing Porsche, with Thomas Flohr in the No. 54 Ferrari in third. In Hypercar, it was Matt Campbell who claimed pole position in the No. 5 Porsche Penske Motorsport Porsche with a lap time of 1:39.347. Second was Nyck de Vries in the No. 7 Toyota, with Callum Ilott third in the No. 12 Porsche. The No. 77 Proton Competition Ford did not set a time in the first LMGT3 qualifying session due to an issue with the car.

=== Qualifying results ===
Pole position winners in each class are marked in bold.

| Pos | Class | No. | Entrant | Qualifying | Hyperpole | Grid |
|---|---|---|---|---|---|---|
| 1 | **Hypercar** | **5** | **(Germany) Porsche Penske Motorsport** | **1:39.154** | **1:39.347** | 1 |
| 2 | Hypercar | 7 | (Japan) Toyota Gazoo Racing | 1:39.567 | 1:39.511 | 2 |
| 3 | Hypercar | 12 | (United Kingdom) Hertz Team Jota | 1:39.714 | 1:39.622 | 3 |
| 4 | Hypercar | 50 | (Italy) Ferrari AF Corse | 1:40.097 | 1:39.976 | 4 |
| 5 | Hypercar | 6 | (Germany) Porsche Penske Motorsport | 1:40.317 | 1:39.981 | 5 |
| 6 | Hypercar | 93 | (France) Peugeot TotalEnergies | 1:39.974 | 1:40.067 | 6 |
| 7 | Hypercar | 2 | (United States) Cadillac Racing | 1:40.446 | 1:40.103 | 7 |
| 8 | Hypercar | 51 | (Italy) Ferrari AF Corse | 1:40.522 | 1:40.224 | 8 |
| 9 | Hypercar | 38 | (United Kingdom) Hertz Team Jota | 1:40.569 | 1:40.362 | 9 |
| 10 | Hypercar | 94 | (France) Peugeot TotalEnergies | 1:40.281 | 1:40.504 | 10 |
| 11 | Hypercar | 8 | (Japan) Toyota Gazoo Racing | 1:40.586 | | 11 |
| 12 | Hypercar | 83 | (Italy) AF Corse | 1:40.634 | | 12 |
| 13 | Hypercar | 99 | (Germany) Proton Competition | 1:40.675 | | 13 |
| 14 | Hypercar | 36 | (France) Alpine Endurance Team | 1:40.682 | | 14 |
| 15 | Hypercar | 15 | (Belgium) BMW M Team WRT | 1:40.702 | | 15 |
| 16 | Hypercar | 20 | (Belgium) BMW M Team WRT | 1:40.738 | | 16 |
| 17 | Hypercar | 35 | (France) Alpine Endurance Team | 1:40.984 | | 17 |
| 18 | Hypercar | 63 | (Italy) Lamborghini Iron Lynx | 1:41.699 | | 18 |
| 19 | Hypercar | 11 | (Italy) Isotta Fraschini | 1:43.189 | | 19 |
| 20 | **LMGT3** | **81** | **(United Kingdom) TF Sport** | **1:55.634** | **1:54.372** | 20 |
| 21 | LMGT3 | 92 | (Lithuania) Manthey PureRxcing | 1:55.611 | 1:55.179 | 21 |
| 22 | LMGT3 | 54 | (Italy) Vista AF Corse | 1:55.666 | 1:55.182 | 22 |
| 23 | LMGT3 | 777 | (Japan) D'station Racing | 1:55.619 | 1:55.184 | 23 |
| 24 | LMGT3 | 27 | (United States) Heart of Racing Team | 1:55.251 | 1:55.320 | 24 |
| 25 | LMGT3 | 85 | (Italy) Iron Dames | 1:55.993 | 1:55.340 | 25 |
| 26 | LMGT3 | 59 | (United Kingdom) United Autosports | 1:55.752 | 1:55.524 | 26 |
| 27 | LMGT3 | 95 | (United Kingdom) United Autosports | 1:56.356 | 1:55.836 | 27 |
| 28 | LMGT3 | 46 | (Belgium) Team WRT | 1:56.244 | 1:56.028 | 28 |
| 29 | LMGT3 | 55 | (Italy) Vista AF Corse | 1:56.381 | 1:56.596 | 29 |
| 30 | LMGT3 | 82 | (United Kingdom) TF Sport | 1:56.586 | | 30 |
| 31 | LMGT3 | 88 | (Germany) Proton Competition | 1:56.650 | | 31 |
| 32 | LMGT3 | 91 | (Germany) Manthey EMA | 1:56.650 | | 32 |
| 33 | LMGT3 | 31 | (Belgium) Team WRT | 1:56.770 | | 33 |
| 34 | LMGT3 | 78 | (France) Akkodis ASP Team | 1:57.117 | | 34 |
| 35 | LMGT3 | 87 | (France) Akkodis ASP Team | 1:57.920 | | 35 |
| 36 | LMGT3 | 60 | (Italy) Iron Lynx | 1:59.792 | | 36 |
| 37 | LMGT3 | 77 | (Germany) Proton Competition | No time | | 37 |

== Race ==
=== Start and early hours ===
The race started at 11:00 AM AST on Saturday. 37 cars took the start: 19 Hypercars and 18 LMGT3s. During the formation laps, the No. 11 Isotta Fraschini lost power and had to take the start from the back of the grid. After the green flag, the No. 50 Ferrari AF Corse with Miguel Molina took the lead, in front of Michael Christensen in the No. 5 Porsche. In LMGT3, Malykhin took the lead in the No. 92 Porsche, ahead of Ian James in the No. 27 Aston Martin. Pole-sitter Tom van Rompuy fell back to sixth. After 26 minutes, the No. 93 Peugeot took the lead of the race, ahead of Laurens Vanthoor in the No. 6 Porsche and Christensen in the No. 5 Porsche. The No. 59 McLaren collided with the No. 85 Iron Dames Lamborghini early in the race, sending the No. 59 into the pits for over 15 minutes.

After contact with the No. 59 McLaren, Calado lost the rear end of his No. 51 Ferrari, which had to be replaced in the pit lane and caused the first full-course yellow of the race, whilst the sister No. 50 Ferrari received a drive-through penalty for crossing the white line at pit entry. After the full course yellow ended, the No. 6 Porsche, driven by Estre, overtook Mikkel Jensen in the No. 93 Peugeot for the lead. The No. 5 Porsche entered the pits due to vibrations in the right-front part of the car, whilst in LMGT3, the No. 81 Corvette lost ten laps in the pit lane after a gearshift issue, which caused the car to come to a standstill in the pit lane. Erwan Bastard overtook both the No. 54 and No. 55 Ferrari's to take third place in his No. 777 D'station Racing Aston Martin.

=== Afternoon to sunset ===
The second full course yellow was due to debris on the race track. The No. 5 Porsche fought back through the field after an earlier vibration, and was in third, behind the No. 6 Porsche and No. 93 Peugeot. The No. 94 Peugeot, however, had to go into the garage after a battery issue, which struck at the end of the fifth hour. The No. 11 Isotta Fraschini also had to visit the garage, due to a problem with the front-left suspension. In LMGT3, the battle between the No. 27 Aston Martin and the No. 92 Porsche heated up, with the Aston Martin taking over the lead from the Porsche. The No. 77 Proton Competition Ford suffered a puncture, which saw the car make an earlier-than-planned pit stop. The No. 91 Porsche also had to visit the garage due to a change of the throttle actuator. Multiple cars, in both Hypercar and LMGT3, picked up drive-through and stop-and-go penalties, with the No. 11 Isotta Fraschini receiving the biggest penalty of all: a 200-second stop-and-go penalty for a technical infringement.

After around six hours of racing, the No. 11 Isotta Fraschini was forced to retire from the race with suspension problems, whilst the No. 81 Corvette was also forced to retire.

=== Sunset to finish ===
After the sun had set, Alex Riberas spun in the No. 27 Aston Martin whilst in second place, behind class leader Klaus Bachler in the No. 92 Porsche. Valentino Rossi occupied third place in the No. 46 BMW M Team WRT BMW. In Hypercar, the No. 6 Porsche extended its leads over the No. 93 Peugeot, whilst the No. 12 Hertz Team Jota Porsche moved up into third. The stewards were still busy handing out penalties to cars in both classes, mainly for pit stop infringements and abuse of track limits.

Battles kept raging across the track for the last two hours, with Mick Schumacher in the No. 36 Alpine Endurance Team Alpine visiting the gravel trap after almost colliding with an LMGT3 car, and Jenson Button and Frédéric Makowiecki battling for fourth in Hypercar. Further down the field, the No. 92 Porsche saw attacks from the No. 27 Aston Martin in the closing stages of the race, with the No. 777 Aston Martin and the No. 46 BMW battling for the final podium position in LMGT3.

On the penultimate lap, the No. 93 Peugeot, which was running in second at the time, suddenly slowed down with Jean-Éric Vergne limping across the track to take the chequered flag. Stellantis Motorsport director Jean-Marc Finot said that the failure was likely due to an unexpected rate of fuel during the car's final pit stop. The car was eventually disqualified for using its ERS system below the minimum required speed.

The No. 6 Porsche with Kévin Estre, André Lotterer, and Laurens Vanthoor at the wheel secured the first victory for Porsche Penske Motorsport in the World Endurance Championship, 33.3 seconds ahead of the No. 12 Hertz Team Jota Porsche of Callum Ilott, Norman Nato, and Will Stevens. The No. 5 Porsche of Matt Campbell, Michael Christensen, and Frédéric Makowiecki completed the Porsche 1–2–3, only 1.1 seconds behind the No. 12 Porsche. The No. 92 Manthey PureRxcing Porsche of Klaus Bachler, Alex Malykhin, and Joel Sturm won the first ever LMGT3 race, 4.8 seconds ahead of the No. 27 Heart of Racing Aston Martin of Ian James, Daniel Mancinelli, and Alex Riberas. The No. 777 D'station Racing Aston Martin of Erwan Bastard, Clément Mateu, and Marco Sørensen finished third, one lap down.

On 28 March, the FIA and ACO published a statement to the FIA WEC noticeboard, declaring that the No. 2 Cadillac Racing Cadillac was disqualified after a breach of technical regulations. Cadillac LMDh chassis builder Dallara accidentally delivered two erroneous parts to the No. 2 crew, which resulted in a mispositioned rear diffuser. The stewards consider no intentional behaviour of Cadillac and Dallara, but still had to disqualify the car, per the regulations.

=== Race results ===
The minimum number of laps for classification (70% of overall winning car's distance) was 234 laps. Class winners are in bold and ‡.

| Pos | Class | No | Team | Drivers | Chassis | Tyre | Laps | Time/Retired |
| Pos | Class | No | Team | Drivers | Engine | Tyre | Laps | Time/Retired |
|---|---|---|---|---|---|---|---|---|
| 1 | **Hypercar** | **6** | **(Germany) Porsche Penske Motorsport** | **(France) Kévin Estre (Germany) André Lotterer (Belgium) Laurens Vanthoor** | **Porsche 963** | M | **335** | **9:55:51.926‡** |
| 1 | **Hypercar** | **6** | **(Germany) Porsche Penske Motorsport** | **(France) Kévin Estre (Germany) André Lotterer (Belgium) Laurens Vanthoor** | **Porsche 9RD 4.6 L Turbo V8** | M | **335** | **9:55:51.926‡** |
| 2 | Hypercar | 12 | (United Kingdom) Hertz Team Jota | (United Kingdom) Callum Ilott (France) Norman Nato (United Kingdom) Will Stevens | Porsche 963 | M | 335 | +33.297 |
| 2 | Hypercar | 12 | (United Kingdom) Hertz Team Jota | (United Kingdom) Callum Ilott (France) Norman Nato (United Kingdom) Will Stevens | Porsche 9RD 4.6 L Turbo V8 | M | 335 | +33.297 |
| 3 | Hypercar | 5 | (Germany) Porsche Penske Motorsport | (Australia) Matt Campbell (Denmark) Michael Christensen (France) Frédéric Makowiecki | Porsche 963 | M | 335 | +34.396 |
| 3 | Hypercar | 5 | (Germany) Porsche Penske Motorsport | (Australia) Matt Campbell (Denmark) Michael Christensen (France) Frédéric Makowiecki | Porsche 9RD 4.6 L Turbo V8 | M | 335 | +34.396 |
| 4 | Hypercar | 83 | (Italy) AF Corse | (Poland) Robert Kubica (Israel) Robert Shwartzman (China) Yifei Ye | Ferrari 499P | M | 334 | +1 Lap |
| 4 | Hypercar | 83 | (Italy) AF Corse | (Poland) Robert Kubica (Israel) Robert Shwartzman (China) Yifei Ye | Ferrari F163 3.0 L Turbo V6 | M | 334 | +1 Lap |
| 5 | Hypercar | 7 | (Japan) Toyota Gazoo Racing | (United Kingdom) Mike Conway (Japan) Kamui Kobayashi (Netherlands) Nyck de Vries | Toyota GR010 Hybrid | M | 334 | +1 Lap |
| 5 | Hypercar | 7 | (Japan) Toyota Gazoo Racing | (United Kingdom) Mike Conway (Japan) Kamui Kobayashi (Netherlands) Nyck de Vries | Toyota H8909 3.5 L Turbo V6 | M | 334 | +1 Lap |
| 6 | Hypercar | 50 | (Italy) Ferrari AF Corse | (Italy) Antonio Fuoco (Spain) Miguel Molina (Denmark) Nicklas Nielsen | Ferrari 499P | M | 333 | +2 Laps |
| 6 | Hypercar | 50 | (Italy) Ferrari AF Corse | (Italy) Antonio Fuoco (Spain) Miguel Molina (Denmark) Nicklas Nielsen | Ferrari F163 3.0 L Turbo V6 | M | 333 | +2 Laps |
| 7 | Hypercar | 35 | (France) Alpine Endurance Team | (France) Paul-Loup Chatin (Austria) Ferdinand Habsburg (France) Charles Milesi | Alpine A424 | M | 333 | +2 Laps |
| 7 | Hypercar | 35 | (France) Alpine Endurance Team | (France) Paul-Loup Chatin (Austria) Ferdinand Habsburg (France) Charles Milesi | Alpine V634 3.4 L Turbo V6 | M | 333 | +2 Laps |
| 8 | Hypercar | 8 | (Japan) Toyota Gazoo Racing | (Switzerland) Sébastien Buemi (New Zealand) Brendon Hartley (Japan) Ryo Hirakawa | Toyota GR010 Hybrid | M | 333 | +2 Laps |
| 8 | Hypercar | 8 | (Japan) Toyota Gazoo Racing | (Switzerland) Sébastien Buemi (New Zealand) Brendon Hartley (Japan) Ryo Hirakawa | Toyota H8909 3.5 L Turbo V6 | M | 333 | +2 Laps |
| 9 | Hypercar | 99 | (Germany) Proton Competition | (France) Julien Andlauer (Switzerland) Neel Jani (United Kingdom) Harry Tincknell | Porsche 963 | M | 333 | +2 Laps |
| 9 | Hypercar | 99 | (Germany) Proton Competition | (France) Julien Andlauer (Switzerland) Neel Jani (United Kingdom) Harry Tincknell | Porsche 9RD 4.6 L Turbo V8 | M | 333 | +2 Laps |
| 10 | Hypercar | 20 | (Belgium) BMW M Team WRT | (Netherlands) Robin Frijns (South Africa) Sheldon van der Linde (Germany) René Rast | BMW M Hybrid V8 | M | 332 | +3 Laps |
| 10 | Hypercar | 20 | (Belgium) BMW M Team WRT | (Netherlands) Robin Frijns (South Africa) Sheldon van der Linde (Germany) René Rast | BMW P66/3 4.0 L Turbo V8 | M | 332 | +3 Laps |
| 11 | Hypercar | 36 | (France) Alpine Endurance Team | (France) Nicolas Lapierre (Germany) Mick Schumacher (France) Matthieu Vaxivière | Alpine A424 | M | 332 | +3 Laps |
| 11 | Hypercar | 36 | (France) Alpine Endurance Team | (France) Nicolas Lapierre (Germany) Mick Schumacher (France) Matthieu Vaxivière | Alpine V634 3.4 L Turbo V6 | M | 332 | +3 Laps |
| 12 | Hypercar | 51 | (Italy) Ferrari AF Corse | (United Kingdom) James Calado (Italy) Antonio Giovinazzi (Italy) Alessandro Pier Guidi | Ferrari 499P | M | 332 | +3 Laps |
| 12 | Hypercar | 51 | (Italy) Ferrari AF Corse | (United Kingdom) James Calado (Italy) Antonio Giovinazzi (Italy) Alessandro Pier Guidi | Ferrari F163 3.0 L Turbo V6 | M | 332 | +3 Laps |
| 13 | Hypercar | 63 | (Italy) Lamborghini Iron Lynx | (Italy) Mirko Bortolotti; Daniil Kvyat (Italy) Edoardo Mortara | Lamborghini SC63 | M | 330 | +5 Laps |
| 13 | Hypercar | 63 | (Italy) Lamborghini Iron Lynx | (Italy) Mirko Bortolotti; Daniil Kvyat (Italy) Edoardo Mortara | Lamborghini 3.8 L Turbo V8 | M | 330 | +5 Laps |
| 14 | Hypercar | 15 | (Belgium) BMW M Team WRT | (Switzerland) Raffaele Marciello (Belgium) Dries Vanthoor (Germany) Marco Wittmann | BMW M Hybrid V8 | M | 327 | +8 Laps |
| 14 | Hypercar | 15 | (Belgium) BMW M Team WRT | (Switzerland) Raffaele Marciello (Belgium) Dries Vanthoor (Germany) Marco Wittmann | BMW P66/3 4.0 L Turbo V8 | M | 327 | +8 Laps |
| 15 | Hypercar | 94 | (France) Peugeot TotalEnergies | (United Kingdom) Paul di Resta (France) Loïc Duval (Belgium) Stoffel Vandoorne | Peugeot 9X8 | M | 316 | +19 Laps |
| 15 | Hypercar | 94 | (France) Peugeot TotalEnergies | (United Kingdom) Paul di Resta (France) Loïc Duval (Belgium) Stoffel Vandoorne | Peugeot X6H 2.6 L Turbo V6 | M | 316 | +19 Laps |
| 16 | **LMGT3** | **92** | **(Lithuania) Manthey PureRxcing** | **(Austria) Klaus Bachler (Saint Kitts and Nevis) Alex Malykhin (Germany) Joel Sturm** | **Porsche 911 GT3 R (992)** | G | **299** | **+36 Laps‡** |
| 16 | **LMGT3** | **92** | **(Lithuania) Manthey PureRxcing** | **(Austria) Klaus Bachler (Saint Kitts and Nevis) Alex Malykhin (Germany) Joel Sturm** | **Porsche M97/80 4.2 L Flat-6** | G | **299** | **+36 Laps‡** |
| 17 | LMGT3 | 27 | (United States) Heart of Racing Team | (United Kingdom) Ian James (Italy) Daniel Mancinelli (Spain) Alex Riberas | Aston Martin Vantage AMR GT3 Evo | G | 299 | +36 Laps |
| 17 | LMGT3 | 27 | (United States) Heart of Racing Team | (United Kingdom) Ian James (Italy) Daniel Mancinelli (Spain) Alex Riberas | Aston Martin M177 4.0 L Turbo V8 | G | 299 | +36 Laps |
| 18 | LMGT3 | 777 | (Japan) D'station Racing | (France) Erwan Bastard (France) Clément Mateu (Denmark) Marco Sørensen | Aston Martin Vantage AMR GT3 Evo | G | 298 | +37 Laps |
| 18 | LMGT3 | 777 | (Japan) D'station Racing | (France) Erwan Bastard (France) Clément Mateu (Denmark) Marco Sørensen | Aston Martin M177 4.0 L Turbo V8 | G | 298 | +37 Laps |
| 19 | LMGT3 | 46 | (Belgium) Team WRT | (Oman) Ahmad Al Harthy (Belgium) Maxime Martin (Italy) Valentino Rossi | BMW M4 GT3 | G | 298 | +37 Laps |
| 19 | LMGT3 | 46 | (Belgium) Team WRT | (Oman) Ahmad Al Harthy (Belgium) Maxime Martin (Italy) Valentino Rossi | BMW P58 3.0 L Turbo I6 | G | 298 | +37 Laps |
| 20 | LMGT3 | 54 | (Italy) Vista AF Corse | (Italy) Francesco Castellacci (Switzerland) Thomas Flohr (Italy) Davide Rigon | Ferrari 296 GT3 | G | 297 | +38 Laps |
| 20 | LMGT3 | 54 | (Italy) Vista AF Corse | (Italy) Francesco Castellacci (Switzerland) Thomas Flohr (Italy) Davide Rigon | Ferrari F163CE 3.0 L Turbo V6 | G | 297 | +38 Laps |
| 21 | LMGT3 | 31 | (Belgium) Team WRT | (Brazil) Augusto Farfus (Indonesia) Sean Gelael (United Kingdom) Darren Leung | BMW M4 GT3 | G | 297 | +38 Laps |
| 21 | LMGT3 | 31 | (Belgium) Team WRT | (Brazil) Augusto Farfus (Indonesia) Sean Gelael (United Kingdom) Darren Leung | BMW P58 3.0 L Turbo I6 | G | 297 | +38 Laps |
| 22 | LMGT3 | 55 | (Italy) Vista AF Corse | (France) François Heriau (United States) Simon Mann (Italy) Alessio Rovera | Ferrari 296 GT3 | G | 297 | +38 Laps |
| 22 | LMGT3 | 55 | (Italy) Vista AF Corse | (France) François Heriau (United States) Simon Mann (Italy) Alessio Rovera | Ferrari F163CE 3.0 L Turbo V6 | G | 297 | +38 Laps |
| 23 | LMGT3 | 85 | (Italy) Iron Dames | (Belgium) Sarah Bovy (Denmark) Michelle Gatting (France) Doriane Pin | Lamborghini Huracán GT3 Evo 2 | G | 295 | +40 Laps |
| 23 | LMGT3 | 85 | (Italy) Iron Dames | (Belgium) Sarah Bovy (Denmark) Michelle Gatting (France) Doriane Pin | Lamborghini DGF 5.2 L V10 | G | 295 | +40 Laps |
| 24 | LMGT3 | 88 | (Germany) Proton Competition | (Norway) Dennis Olsen (Denmark) Mikkel O. Pedersen (Italy) Giorgio Roda | Ford Mustang GT3 | G | 294 | +41 Laps |
| 24 | LMGT3 | 88 | (Germany) Proton Competition | (Norway) Dennis Olsen (Denmark) Mikkel O. Pedersen (Italy) Giorgio Roda | Ford Coyote 5.4 L V8 | G | 294 | +41 Laps |
| 25 | LMGT3 | 82 | (United Kingdom) TF Sport | (France) Sébastien Baud (Spain) Daniel Juncadella (Japan) Hiroshi Koizumi | Chevrolet Corvette Z06 GT3.R | G | 294 | +41 Laps |
| 25 | LMGT3 | 82 | (United Kingdom) TF Sport | (France) Sébastien Baud (Spain) Daniel Juncadella (Japan) Hiroshi Koizumi | Chevrolet LT6.R 5.5 L V8 | G | 294 | +41 Laps |
| 26 | LMGT3 | 77 | (Germany) Proton Competition | (United Kingdom) Ben Barker (United States) Ryan Hardwick (Canada) Zacharie Robichon | Ford Mustang GT3 | G | 293 | +42 Laps |
| 26 | LMGT3 | 77 | (Germany) Proton Competition | (United Kingdom) Ben Barker (United States) Ryan Hardwick (Canada) Zacharie Robichon | Ford Coyote 5.4 L V8 | G | 293 | +42 Laps |
| 27 | LMGT3 | 60 | (Italy) Iron Lynx | (Italy) Matteo Cressoni (France) Franck Perera (Italy) Claudio Schiavoni | Lamborghini Huracán GT3 Evo 2 | G | 291 | +44 Laps |
| 27 | LMGT3 | 60 | (Italy) Iron Lynx | (Italy) Matteo Cressoni (France) Franck Perera (Italy) Claudio Schiavoni | Lamborghini DGF 5.2 L V10 | G | 291 | +44 Laps |
| 28 | LMGT3 | 95 | (United Kingdom) United Autosports | (United Kingdom) Josh Caygill (Chile) Nico Pino (Japan) Marino Sato | McLaren 720S GT3 Evo | G | 284 | +51 Laps |
| 28 | LMGT3 | 95 | (United Kingdom) United Autosports | (United Kingdom) Josh Caygill (Chile) Nico Pino (Japan) Marino Sato | McLaren M840T 4.0 L Turbo V8 | G | 284 | +51 Laps |
| 29 | LMGT3 | 59 | (United Kingdom) United Autosports | (Brazil) Nicolas Costa (United Kingdom) James Cottingham (Switzerland) Grégoire Saucy | McLaren 720S GT3 Evo | G | 284 | +51 Laps |
| 29 | LMGT3 | 59 | (United Kingdom) United Autosports | (Brazil) Nicolas Costa (United Kingdom) James Cottingham (Switzerland) Grégoire Saucy | McLaren M840T 4.0 L Turbo V8 | G | 284 | +51 Laps |
| 30 | LMGT3 | 91 | (Germany) Manthey EMA | (Austria) Richard Lietz (Netherlands) Morris Schuring (Australia) Yasser Shahin | Porsche 911 GT3 R (992) | G | 284 | +51 Laps |
| 30 | LMGT3 | 91 | (Germany) Manthey EMA | (Austria) Richard Lietz (Netherlands) Morris Schuring (Australia) Yasser Shahin | Porsche M97/80 4.2 L Flat-6 | G | 284 | +51 Laps |
| 31 | LMGT3 | 87 | (France) Akkodis ASP Team | (Japan) Takeshi Kimura (Argentina) José María López (France) Esteban Masson | Lexus RC F GT3 | G | 273 | +62 Laps |
| 31 | LMGT3 | 87 | (France) Akkodis ASP Team | (Japan) Takeshi Kimura (Argentina) José María López (France) Esteban Masson | Lexus 2UR-GSE 5.4 L V8 | G | 273 | +62 Laps |
| NC | Hypercar | 38 | (United Kingdom) Hertz Team Jota | (United Kingdom) Jenson Button (United Kingdom) Philip Hanson (Denmark) Oliver Rasmussen | Porsche 963 | M | 309 | Hybrid |
| NC | Hypercar | 38 | (United Kingdom) Hertz Team Jota | (United Kingdom) Jenson Button (United Kingdom) Philip Hanson (Denmark) Oliver Rasmussen | Porsche 9RD 4.6 L Turbo V8 | M | 309 | Hybrid |
| Ret | LMGT3 | 78 | (France) Akkodis ASP Team | Timur Boguslavskiy (South Africa) Kelvin van der Linde (France) Arnold Robin | Lexus RC F GT3 | G | 249 | Engine |
| Ret | LMGT3 | 78 | (France) Akkodis ASP Team | Timur Boguslavskiy (South Africa) Kelvin van der Linde (France) Arnold Robin | Lexus 2UR-GSE 5.4 L V8 | G | 249 | Engine |
| Ret | LMGT3 | 81 | (United Kingdom) TF Sport | (Angola) Rui Andrade (Republic of Ireland) Charlie Eastwood (Belgium) Tom van Rompuy | Chevrolet Corvette Z06 GT3.R | G | 177 | Gearshift |
| Ret | LMGT3 | 81 | (United Kingdom) TF Sport | (Angola) Rui Andrade (Republic of Ireland) Charlie Eastwood (Belgium) Tom van Rompuy | Chevrolet LT6.R 5.5 L V8 | G | 177 | Gearshift |
| Ret | Hypercar | 11 | (Italy) Isotta Fraschini | (United States) Carl Bennett (Canada) Antonio Serravalle (France) Jean-Karl Vernay | Isotta Fraschini Tipo 6-C | M | 157 | Suspension |
| Ret | Hypercar | 11 | (Italy) Isotta Fraschini | (United States) Carl Bennett (Canada) Antonio Serravalle (France) Jean-Karl Vernay | Isotta Fraschini 3.0 L Turbo V6 | M | 157 | Suspension |
| DSQ | Hypercar | 2 | (United States) Cadillac Racing | (New Zealand) Earl Bamber (France) Sébastien Bourdais (United Kingdom) Alex Lynn | Cadillac V-Series.R | M | 334 | Rear diffuser (Note: The No. 2 Cadillac Racing entry was disqualified after a breach of the technical regulations.) |
| DSQ | Hypercar | 2 | (United States) Cadillac Racing | (New Zealand) Earl Bamber (France) Sébastien Bourdais (United Kingdom) Alex Lynn | Cadillac LMC55R 5.5 L V8 | M | 334 | Rear diffuser |
| DSQ | Hypercar | 93 | (France) Peugeot TotalEnergies | (Denmark) Mikkel Jensen (Switzerland) Nico Müller (France) Jean-Éric Vergne | Peugeot 9X8 | M | 334 | ERS (Note: The No. 93 Peugeot TotalEnergies entry was disqualified after deploying ERS below the required speed.) |
| DSQ | Hypercar | 93 | (France) Peugeot TotalEnergies | (Denmark) Mikkel Jensen (Switzerland) Nico Müller (France) Jean-Éric Vergne | Peugeot X6H 2.6 L Turbo V6 | M | 334 | ERS |

== Standings after the race ==
2024 Hypercar World Endurance Drivers' Championship

| Pos | Driver | Points |
|---|---|---|
| 1 | (France) Kévin Estre (Germany) André Lotterer (Belgium) Laurens Vanthoor | 38 |
| 2 | (United Kingdom) Callum Ilott (France) Norman Nato (United Kingdom) Will Stevens | 27 |
| 3 | (Australia) Matt Campbell (Denmark) Michael Christensen (France) Frédéric Makowiecki | 24 |
| 4 | (Poland) Robert Kubica (Israel) Robert Shwartzman (China) Yifei Ye | 18 |
| 5 | (United Kingdom) Mike Conway (Japan) Kamui Kobayashi (Netherlands) Nyck de Vries | 15 |

2024 Hypercar World Endurance Manufacturers' Championship

| Pos | Manufacturer | Points |
|---|---|---|
| 1 | (Germany) Porsche | 39 |
| 2 | (Japan) Toyota | 23 |
| 3 | (Italy) Ferrari | 18 |
| 4 | (France) Alpine | 15 |
| 5 | (Germany) BMW | 9 |

2024 FIA World Cup for Hypercar Teams

| Pos | No | Team | Points |
|---|---|---|---|
| 1 | 12 | (United Kingdom) Hertz Team Jota | 38 |
| 2 | 83 | (Italy) AF Corse | 27 |
| 3 | 99 | (Germany) Proton Competition | 23 |
| 4 | 38 | (United Kingdom) Hertz Team Jota | 0 |

2024 FIA Endurance Trophy for LMGT3 Drivers

| Pos | Driver | Points |
|---|---|---|
| 1 | (Austria) Klaus Bachler (Saint Kitts and Nevis) Alex Malykhin (Germany) Joel Sturm | 38 |
| 2 | (United Kingdom) Ian James (Italy) Daniel Mancinelli (Spain) Alex Riberas | 27 |
| 3 | (France) Erwan Bastard (France) Clément Mateu (Denmark) Marco Sørensen | 23 |
| 4 | (Oman) Ahmad Al Harthy (Belgium) Maxime Martin (Italy) Valentino Rossi | 18 |
| 5 | (Italy) Francesco Castellacci (Switzerland) Thomas Flohr (Italy) Davide Rigon | 15 |

2024 FIA Endurance Trophy for LMGT3 Teams

| Pos | No | Team | Points |
|---|---|---|---|
| 1 | 92 | (Lithuania) Manthey PureRxcing | 38 |
| 2 | 27 | (United States) Heart of Racing Team | 27 |
| 3 | 777 | (Japan) D'station Racing | 23 |
| 4 | 46 | (Belgium) BMW M Team WRT | 18 |
| 5 | 54 | (Italy) Vista AF Corse | 15 |

== Official recordings ==
- Free Practice 3 | 2024 Qatar 1812KM on YouTube
- Qualifying And Hyperpole Sessions | 2024 Qatar 1812KM on YouTube
- Full Race | 2024 Qatar 1812KM on YouTube
