= BMW M Hybrid V8 =

Sports prototype racing car built by BMW

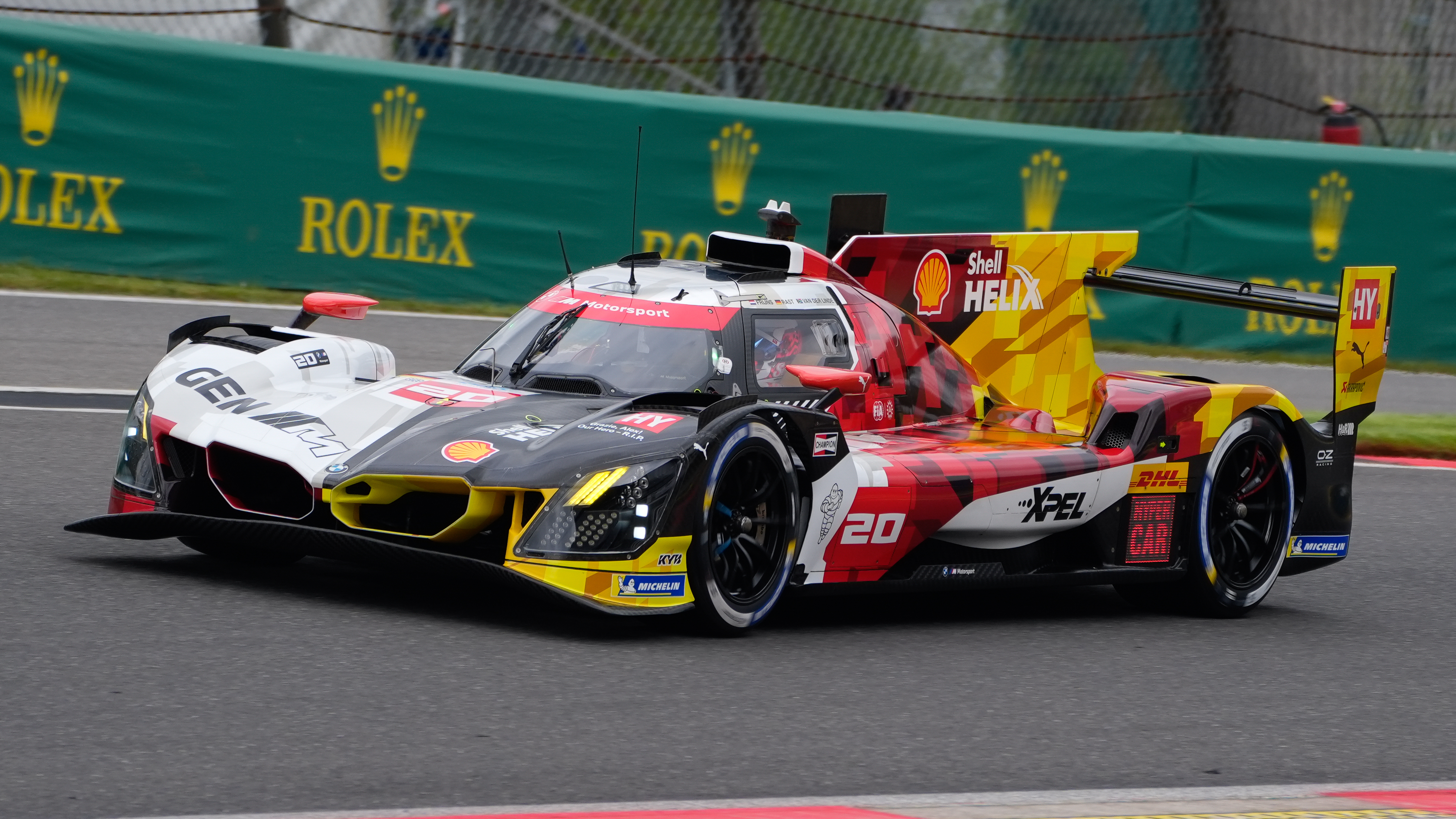
- The No. 20 M Hybrid V8 at the 2026 6 Hours of Spa-Francorchamps
- Category: LMDh
- Designers: Michael Scully (Global Automotive Director, BMW Designworks); Hussein Al-Attar (Lead Exterior Designer); Maurizio Leschiutta (Project Leader, LMDh); Ulrich Schulz (Head of Drivetrain Design)
- Predecessor: BMW V12 LMR

Technical specifications
- Chassis: LMP2-based carbon fiber monocoque
- Engine: BMW P66/3 3,999 cc (244.0 cu in) 90° V8 twin-turbocharged, 32-valve, DOHC
- Torque: 650 N⋅m (479 lb⋅ft)
- Electric motor: Rear-mounted 50 kW (68 PS; 67 hp) spec MGU supplied by Bosch
- Transmission: Xtrac P1359 7-speed sequential manual
- Power: 477 kW (649 PS; 640 hp) (combustion engine only) 500 kW (680 PS; 671 bhp) (combined)
- Weight: 1,030 kg (2,270.8 lb)
- Fuel: TotalEnergies (WEC); VP Racing Fuels (IMSA)
- Lubricants: Shell (WEC); Pennzoil (IMSA)
- Brakes: Brembo
- Tyres: Michelin slicks with OZ one-piece forged alloys, 29/71-18 front and 34/71-18 rear

Competition history
- Notable entrants: (Germany) / (United States) BMW M Team RLL; (Belgium) BMW M Team WRT
- Notable drivers: (Austria) Philipp Eng; (United Kingdom) Nick Yelloly; (Germany) Marco Wittmann; (Brazil) Augusto Farfus; (United States) Colton Herta; (United States) Connor De Phillippi; (Denmark) Kevin Magnussen; (Belgium) Dries Vanthoor
- Debut: 2023 24 Hours of Daytona
- First win: 2023 Sahlen's Six Hours of The Glen
- Last win: 2026 IMSA Battle on the Bricks
- Last event: 2026 6 Hours of Monza
Races	Wins	Podiums	Poles	F/Laps
60	6	15	5	1
- Teams' Championships: 0
- Constructors' Championships: 0
- Drivers' Championships: 0

The BMW M Hybrid V8 is a sports prototype racing car designed by BMW M and built by Dallara. It is designed to the Le Mans Daytona h (LMDh) regulations, and debuted in the 2023 IMSA SportsCar Championship at the season-opening 24 Hours of Daytona. It marks BMW's first return to the top-flight of sports prototype racing since the BMW V12 LMR in 1999. The car also participates in the FIA World Endurance Championship from 2024 onwards.

== Background ==
In June 2021, BMW formally announced they would join IMSA's GTP class in 2023, using an LMDh-compliant racing design. 3 months later, it was confirmed BMW would work with Dallara as their chassis supplier, making BMW the first manufacturer in the LMDh ruleset to select Dallara as their partner. A partnership with Rahal Letterman Lanigan Racing to campaign the cars in IMSA was announced in November 2021, continuing a relationship that began with the BMW M3 GT2 in 2009. The M Hybrid V8's engine is a twin-turbocharged V8, which is a development of the engine found in the BMW M4 DTM during 2017 and 2018, paired with the standardised hybrid parts provided by Williams Advanced Engineering, Bosch and Xtrac. In August 2022, it was announced BMW would bring the car to the FIA World Endurance Championship as well, operated by Team WRT.

The M Hybrid V8 completed its first shakedown at Varano de Melegari at the end of July 2022 followed by testing at the Circuit de Barcelona-Catalunya, Watkins Glen International, Road Atlanta, and Sebring International Raceway.

== Racing history ==
=== 2023 ===
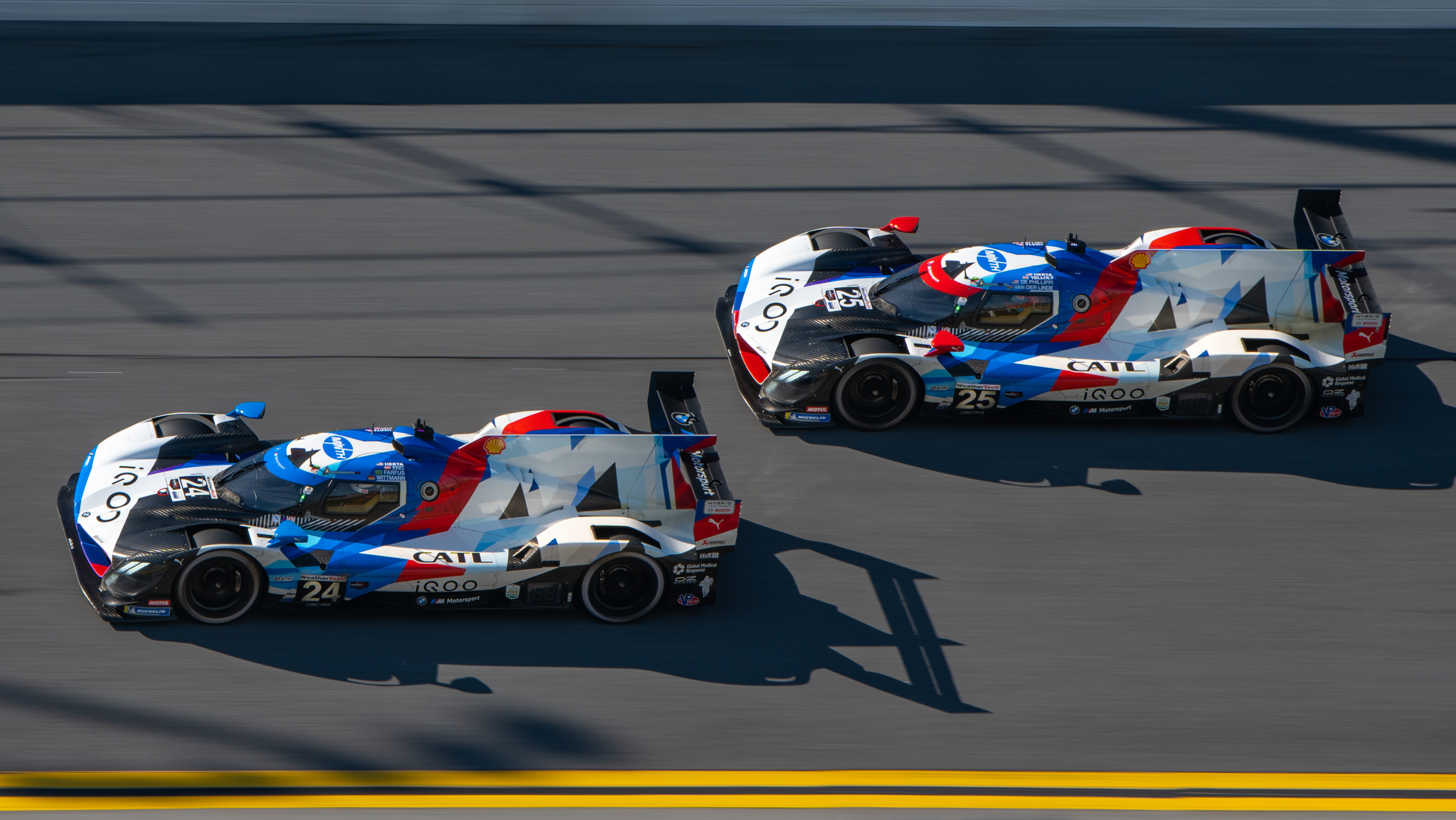
The #24 and #25 M Hybrid V8 on the banking at the 2023 24 Hours of Daytona.

The BMW M Hybrid V8 completed its global racing debut at the 2023 24 Hours of Daytona with Rahal Letterman Lanigan Racing, racing alongside Acura, Cadillac, and Porsche, who had also debuted new sports cars as part of the Le Mans Hypercar and LMDh regulation changes replacing DPi as the top class. Both cars suffered technical problems throughout the course of the race related to the hybrid system, brakes, and electrics, though one of the entires, the #24 car, did well enough to finish within the top 6. In the following race at the 2023 12 Hours of Sebring, Connor De Phillippi, Sheldon van der Linde, and Nick Yelloly in the #25 car recovered from a brake change in the final two hours and took advantage of a late-race incident where the Acura of Filipe Albuquerque and the Porsches of Mathieu Jaminet and Felipe Nasr collided, ultimately finishing 2nd overall.

Another podium followed at the 2023 Grand Prix of Long Beach. De Phillippi in the #25 car had fought for the podium positions against the #7 Porsche and the #10 Acura, eventually passing the Porsche and finishing in 2nd overall, taking advantage of another position after Ricky Taylor crashed on the penultimate lap.

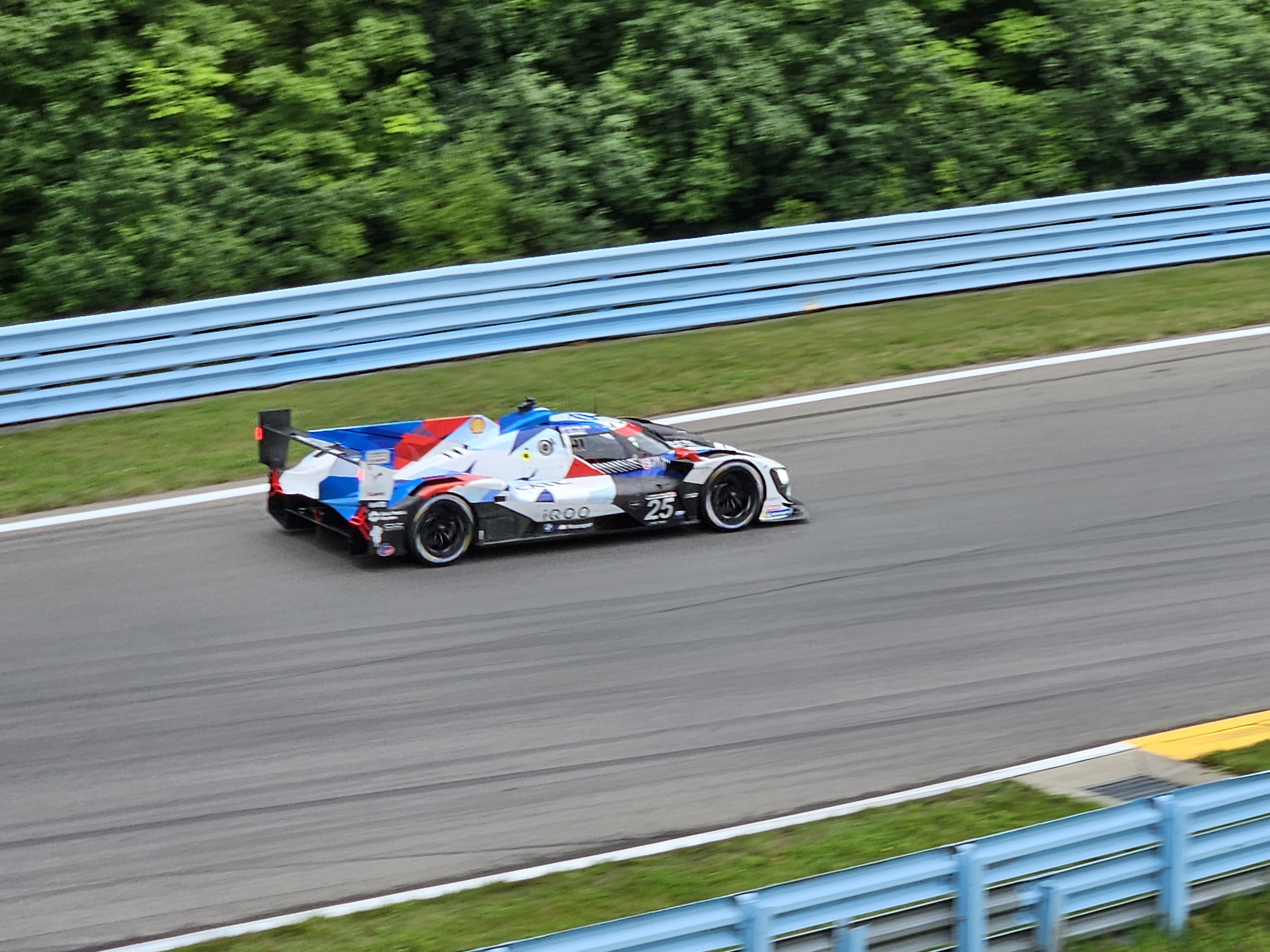
The #25 BMW M Hybrid V8 (pictured at the 2023 Sahlen's Six Hours of The Glen) took BMW's first overall victory in endurance prototype racing since 2000 at Silverstone.

At the 2023 Sahlen's Six Hours of The Glen, the #25 M Hybrid V8 fought for the lead during the course of the race against the #6 Porsche, #31 Cadillac, and #60 Acura. Through a better strategy, De Phillippi was able to take the lead with 40 minutes remaining, but was beat to the finish by Jaminet in the #6 Porsche, who overtook De Phillippi in the final minutes prior to the race ending behind the safety car. Following a post-race penalty against the #6 Porsche for illegal skid block wear, the #25 BMW inherited the race win, a maiden victory for the M Hybrid V8. The win marked BMW's first victory in a sports prototype since the 2000 American Le Mans Series at Silverstone. Two more podiums followed for the #25 car at the 2023 Chevrolet Grand Prix, taking advantage of an alternative strategy, and the 2023 IMSA Battle on the Bricks, where the #25 car was able to jump the #31 Cadillac in the final round of pitstops.

Outside of competition, BMW completed a series of tests with Team WRT at MotorLand Aragón and Circuit de Spa-Francorchamps in preparation for the 2024 FIA World Endurance Championship.

=== 2024 ===
BMW officially joined the FIA World Endurance Championship in 2024. Their lineups consisted of Raffaele Marciello, Dries Vanthoor, and Marco Wittmann in the #15 car, and Robin Frijns, René Rast, and Sheldon van der Linde in the #20 car. WRT were able to score in the car's first outing at the 2024 Qatar 1812 km, with the #20 car finishing 10th overall. BMW returned to the 24 Hours of Le Mans in 2024, marking the first time the German marque competed in the top class of the endurance race in 25 years, when they won previously with the BMW V12 LMR at the 1999 24 Hours of Le Mans. Ahead of the race, the #20 M Hybrid V8 became the 20th car to be part of the BMW Art Car project, adapting the Everywhen painting by Ethiopian-American visual artist Julie Mehretu. The M Hybrid displayed strong qualifying pace, however, faced trouble in the race, with neither cars making it to the finish. The team's first WEC podium came at the 2024 6 Hours of Fuji, where the #15 crew finished 2nd overall.

Jesse Krohn replaced Augusto Farfus in the full-time seat in the #24 car for 2024 IMSA SportsCar Championship, the latter moving to BMW's LMGT3 program in WEC. The M Hybrid cars were in the midfield in the opening stages of the season but gradually increased in pace, culminating in a 1-2 finish at the 2024 IMSA Battle on the Bricks in Indianapolis, securing the M Hybrid's second victory in either series.

=== 2025 ===
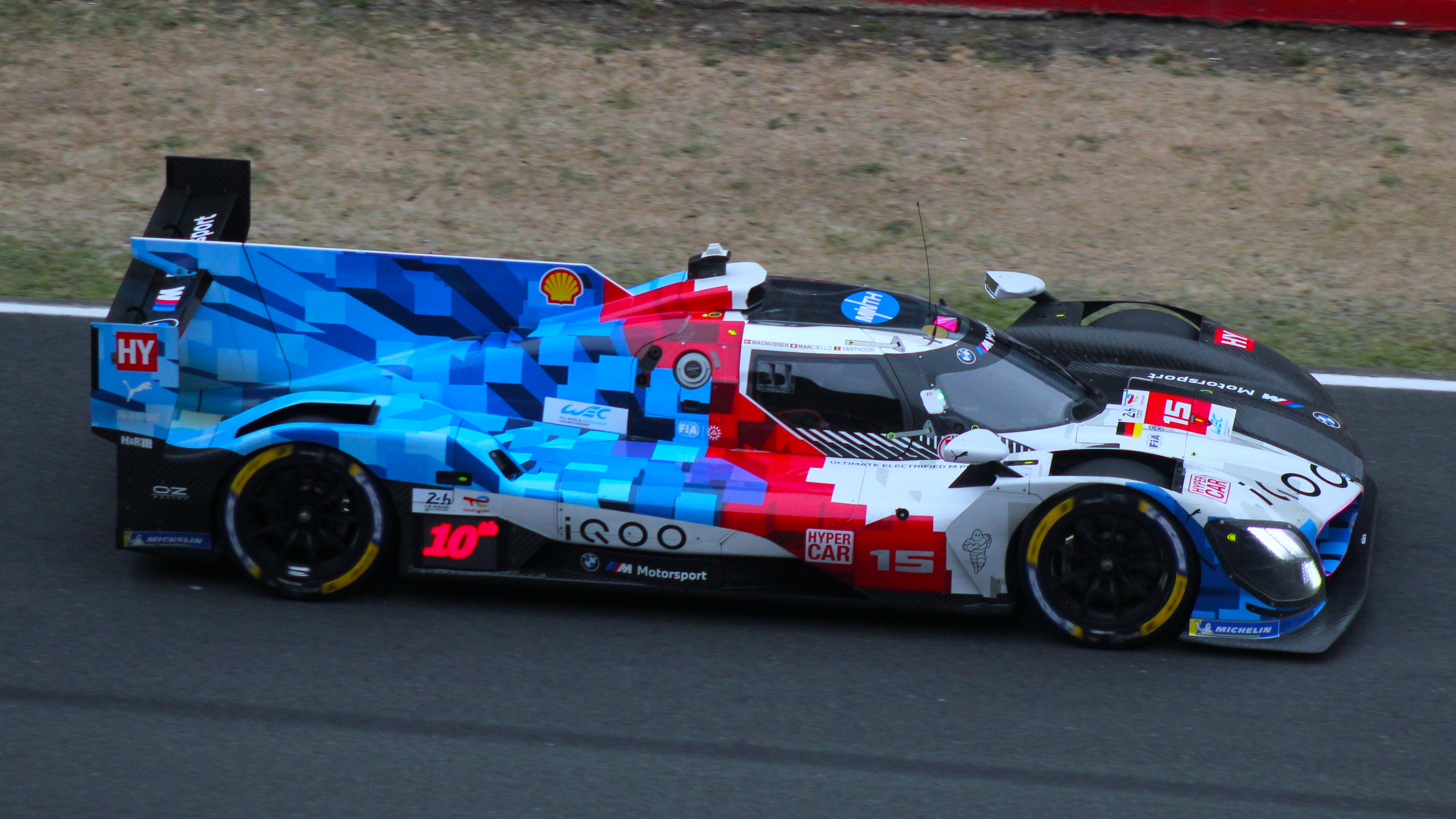
The #15 BMW M Hybrid V8 at the 2025 24 Hours of Le Mans.

Kevin Magnussen returned to sports car racing and joined BMW for 2025, competing primarily in the 2025 FIA World Endurance Championship replacing Marco Wittmann, and also participating in the IMSA Michelin Endurance Cup rounds of the 2025 IMSA SportsCar Championship. Vanthoor was promoted to a full-time Hypercar seat in IMSA, replacing Krohn.

In the first stage of their IMSA campaign, the M Hybrid V8 scored four consecutive pole positions between the season opener at the 2025 24 Hours of Daytona and the fourth round at the 2025 Monterey SportsCar Championship with Dries Vanthoor behind the wheel. The #24 crew finished on the podium in the third and fourth rounds at Long Beach and Laguna Seca. In their WEC campaign, the M Hybrid V8 equalled its best finish in the series, the #20 crew finishing 2nd overall at the 2025 6 Hours of Imola.

In July, BMW announced that they would split from Rahal Letterman Lanigan Racing at the end of the year. The manufacturer later revealed an updated version of the M Hybrid V8 for 2026. The updated car featured new front styling with a smaller kidney grille and improved aerodynamics.

=== 2026 ===
Committing to an alternate strategy after a weak qualifying performance, BMW took home a 1-2 finish at the 2026 6 Hours of Spa-Francorchamps, securing their first victory in the FIA World Endurance Championship.

== Racing results ==
=== Complete IMSA SportsCar Championship results ===
(key) Races in bold indicates pole position. Races in italics indicates fastest lap.

Year	Entrants	Class	Drivers	No.	1	2	3	4	5	6	7	8	9	Pts.	Pos.
2023					DAY	SEB	LBH	MON	WGL	MOS	ELK	IMS	PET		
2023	BMW M Team RLL	GTP	(Austria) Philipp Eng	24	6	Ret	4	5	Ret	8	Ret	Ret	8	2341	8th
2023	BMW M Team RLL	GTP	(Brazil) Augusto Farfus	24	6	Ret	4	5	Ret	8	Ret	Ret	8	2341	8th
2023	BMW M Team RLL	GTP	(Germany) Marco Wittmann	24	6	Ret							8	2341	8th
2023	BMW M Team RLL	GTP	(United States) Colton Herta	24	6									2341	8th
2023	BMW M Team RLL	GTP	(United States) Connor De Phillippi	25	9	2	2	9	1	3	Ret	3	7	2687	6th
2023	BMW M Team RLL	GTP	(United Kingdom) Nick Yelloly	25	9	2	2	9	1	3	Ret	3	7	2687	6th
2023	BMW M Team RLL	GTP	(South Africa) Sheldon van der Linde	25	9	2							7	2687	6th
2023	BMW M Team RLL	GTP	(United States) Colton Herta	25	9									2687	6th
2024					DAY	SEB	LBH	LGA	DET	WGL	ELK	IMS	ATL		
2024	BMW M Team RLL	GTP	(Austria) Philipp Eng	24	8	6	6	Ret	7	5	7	1	4	2537	7th
2024	BMW M Team RLL	GTP	(Finland) Jesse Krohn	24	8	6	6	Ret	7	5	7	1	4	2537	7th
2024	BMW M Team RLL	GTP	(Brazil) Augusto Farfus	24	8	6							4	2537	7th
2024	BMW M Team RLL	GTP	(Belgium) Dries Vanthoor	24	8									2537	7th
2024	BMW M Team RLL	GTP	(United States) Connor De Phillippi	25	7	4	Ret	7	Ret	6	Ret	2	Ret	2392	8th
2024	BMW M Team RLL	GTP	(United Kingdom) Nick Yelloly	25	7	4	Ret	7	Ret	6	Ret	2	Ret	2392	8th
2024	BMW M Team RLL	GTP	(Belgium) Maxime Martin	25	7	4							Ret	2392	8th
2024	BMW M Team RLL	GTP	(Germany) René Rast	25	7									2392	8th
2025					DAY	SEB	LBH	LGA	DET	WGL	ELK	IMS	ATL		
2025	BMW M Team RLL	GTP	(Austria) Philipp Eng	24	**4**	**12**	**3**	**3**	5	8	1	4	9	2679	4th
2025	BMW M Team RLL	GTP	(Belgium) Dries Vanthoor	24	**4**	**12**	**3**	**3**	5	8	1	4	9	2679	4th
2025	BMW M Team RLL	GTP	(Denmark) Kevin Magnussen	24	**4**	**12**							9	2679	4th
2025	BMW M Team RLL	GTP	(Switzerland) Raffaele Marciello	24	**4**									2679	4th
2025	BMW M Team RLL	GTP	(South Africa) Sheldon van der Linde	25	7	5	5	4	7	Ret	2	6	11	2469	8th
2025	BMW M Team RLL	GTP	(Germany) Marco Wittmann	25	7	5	5	4	7	Ret	2	6	11	2469	8th
2025	BMW M Team RLL	GTP	(Netherlands) Robin Frijns	25	7	5							11	2469	8th
2025	BMW M Team RLL	GTP	(Germany) René Rast	25	7									2469	8th
2026*					DAY	SEB	LBH	LGA	DET	WGL	ELK	IMS	ATL		
2026*	BMW M Team WRT	GTP	(South Africa) Sheldon van der Linde	24	3	5	5	9	9	4	Ret	1	2	2300	5th
2026*	BMW M Team WRT	GTP	(Belgium) Dries Vanthoor	24	3	5	5	9	9	4	Ret	1	2	2300	5th
2026*	BMW M Team WRT	GTP	(Germany) René Rast	24	3									2300	5th
2026*	BMW M Team WRT	GTP	(Netherlands) Robin Frijns	24	3	5							2	2300	5th
2026*	BMW M Team WRT	GTP	(Austria) Philipp Eng	25	8	10	11	3	2	9	7	10	Ret	2116	10th
2026*	BMW M Team WRT	GTP	(Germany) Marco Wittmann	25	8	10	11	3	2	9	7	10	Ret	2116	10th
2026*	BMW M Team WRT	GTP	(Denmark) Kevin Magnussen	25	8	10							Ret	2116	10th
2026*	BMW M Team WRT	GTP	(Switzerland) Raffaele Marciello	25	8									2116	10th

=== Complete IMSA Michelin Endurance Cup results ===
(key) Races in bold indicates pole position. Races in italics indicates fastest lap.

Year	Entrants	Class	Drivers	No.	1	2	3	4	5	Pts.	Pos.
2023					DAY	SEB	WGL	PET			
2023	BMW M Team RLL	GTP	(Austria) Philipp Eng	24	6	Ret	Ret	8		25	7th
2023	BMW M Team RLL	GTP	(Brazil) Augusto Farfus	24	6	Ret	Ret	8		25	7th
2023	BMW M Team RLL	GTP	(Germany) Marco Wittmann	24	6	Ret		8		25	7th
2023	BMW M Team RLL	GTP	(United States) Colton Herta	24	6					25	7th
2023	BMW M Team RLL	GTP	(United States) Connor De Phillippi	25	9	2	1	7		29	5th
2023	BMW M Team RLL	GTP	(United Kingdom) Nick Yelloly	25	9	2	1	7		29	5th
2023	BMW M Team RLL	GTP	(South Africa) Sheldon van der Linde	25	9	2		7		29	5th
2023	BMW M Team RLL	GTP	(United States) Colton Herta	25	9					29	5th
2024					DAY	SEB	WGL	IMS	ATL		
2024	BMW M Team RLL	GTP	(Austria) Philipp Eng	24	8	6	5	1	4	31	8th
2024	BMW M Team RLL	GTP	(Finland) Jesse Krohn	24	8	6	5	1	4	31	8th
2024	BMW M Team RLL	GTP	(Brazil) Augusto Farfus	24	8	6			4	31	8th
2024	BMW M Team RLL	GTP	(Belgium) Dries Vanthoor	24	8					31	8th
2024	BMW M Team RLL	GTP	(United States) Connor De Phillippi	25	7	4	6	2	Ret	36	5th
2024	BMW M Team RLL	GTP	(United Kingdom) Nick Yelloly	25	7	4	6	2	Ret	36	5th
2024	BMW M Team RLL	GTP	(Belgium) Maxime Martin	25	7	4			Ret	36	5th
2024	BMW M Team RLL	GTP	(Germany) René Rast	25	7					36	5th
2025					DAY	SEB	WGL	IMS	ATL		
2025	BMW M Team RLL	GTP	(Austria) Philipp Eng	24	**4**	**12**	8	4	9	30	8th
2025	BMW M Team RLL	GTP	(Denmark) Kevin Magnussen	24	**4**	**12**	8	4	9	30	8th
2025	BMW M Team RLL	GTP	(Belgium) Dries Vanthoor	24	**4**	**12**			9	30	8th
2025	BMW M Team RLL	GTP	(Switzerland) Raffaele Marciello	24	**4**					30	8th
2025	BMW M Team RLL	GTP	(Netherlands) Robin Frijns	25	7	5	Ret	6	11	28	9th
2025	BMW M Team RLL	GTP	(South Africa) Sheldon van der Linde	25	7	5	Ret	6	11	28	9th
2025	BMW M Team RLL	GTP	(Germany) Marco Wittmann	25	7	5			11	28	9th
2025	BMW M Team RLL	GTP	(Germany) René Rast	25	7					28	9th
2026*					DAY	SEB	WGL	ELK	ATL		
2026*	BMW M Team WRT	GTP	(South Africa) Sheldon van der Linde	24	3	5	4	Ret		25	7th
2026*	BMW M Team WRT	GTP	(Belgium) Dries Vanthoor	24	3	5	4	Ret		25	7th
2026*	BMW M Team WRT	GTP	(Germany) René Rast	24	3					25	7th
2026*	BMW M Team WRT	GTP	(Netherlands) Robin Frijns	24	3	5				25	7th
2026*	BMW M Team WRT	GTP	(Austria) Philipp Eng	25	8	10	9	7		23	9th
2026*	BMW M Team WRT	GTP	(Germany) Marco Wittmann	25	8	10	9	7		23	9th
2026*	BMW M Team WRT	GTP	(Denmark) Kevin Magnussen	25	8	10				23	9th
2026*	BMW M Team WRT	GTP	(Switzerland) Raffaele Marciello	25	8					23	9th

=== Complete FIA World Endurance Championship results ===
(key) Races in bold indicates pole position. Races in italics indicates fastest lap.

Year	Entrants	Class	Drivers	No.	1	2	3	4	5	6	7	8	Points	Pos
2024					QAT	IMO	SPA	LMN	SAO	COA	FUJ	BHR		
2024	BMW M Team WRT	Hypercar	(Switzerland) Raffaele Marciello	15	14	DSQ	Ret	Ret	9	8	2	5	64	5th
2024	BMW M Team WRT	Hypercar	(Belgium) Dries Vanthoor	15	14	DSQ	Ret	Ret	9	8	2	5	64	5th
2024	BMW M Team WRT	Hypercar	(Germany) Marco Wittmann	15	14	DSQ	Ret	Ret	9	8	2	5	64	5th
2024	BMW M Team WRT	Hypercar	(Netherlands) Robin Frijns	20	10	6	13	NC	14	13	Ret	Ret	64	5th
2024	BMW M Team WRT	Hypercar	(Germany) René Rast	20	10	6	13	NC	14	13	Ret	Ret	64	5th
2024	BMW M Team WRT	Hypercar	(South Africa) Sheldon van der Linde	20	10	6	13	NC	14	13	Ret	Ret	64	5th
2025					QAT	IMO	SPA	LMN	SAO	COA	FUJ	BHR		
2025	BMW M Team WRT	Hypercar	(Denmark) Kevin Magnussen	15	4	6	10	18	17	12	Ret	Ret	87	5th
2025	BMW M Team WRT	Hypercar	(Switzerland) Raffaele Marciello	15	4	6	10	18	17	12	Ret	Ret	87	5th
2025	BMW M Team WRT	Hypercar	(Belgium) Dries Vanthoor	15	4	6		17	18	12	Ret	Ret	87	5th
2025	BMW M Team WRT	Hypercar	(Netherlands) Robin Frijns	20	7	2	Ret	17		NC	8	8	87	5th
2025	BMW M Team WRT	Hypercar	(Germany) René Rast	20	7	2	Ret	17	5	NC	8	8	87	5th
2025	BMW M Team WRT	Hypercar	(South Africa) Sheldon van der Linde	20	7	2		17	5	NC	8	8	87	5th
2025	BMW M Team WRT	Hypercar	(Germany) Marco Wittmann	20					5				87	5th
2026*					IMO	SPA	LMN	SÃO	COA	FUJ	CAT	MNZ		
2026*	BMW M Team WRT	Hypercar	(Denmark) Kevin Magnussen	15	7	2	**Ret**	1	8	3	7	5	172	2nd
2026*	BMW M Team WRT	Hypercar	(Switzerland) Raffaele Marciello	15	7	2	**Ret**	1	8	3	7	5	172	2nd
2026*	BMW M Team WRT	Hypercar	(Belgium) Dries Vanthoor	15		2	**Ret**	1	8	3	7	5	172	2nd
2026*	BMW M Team WRT	Hypercar	(Netherlands) Robin Frijns	20	5	1	2	8	12	13	14	7	172	2nd
2026*	BMW M Team WRT	Hypercar	(Germany) René Rast	20	5	1	2	8	12	13	14	7	172	2nd
2026*	BMW M Team WRT	Hypercar	(South Africa) Sheldon van der Linde	20		1	2	8	12	13	14	7	172	2nd

=== Race Victories ===
Year	Series	Race	Track	Car #	Team	Category
2023	IMSA	Sahlen's Six Hours of The Glen	(United States) Watkins Glen International	25	(United States) BMW M Team RLL	GTP
2024	IMSA	IMSA Battle on the Bricks	(United States) Indianapolis Motor Speedway	24	(United States) BMW M Team RLL	GTP
2025	IMSA	SportsCar Grand Prix	(United States) Road America	24	(United States) BMW M Team RLL	GTP
2026	WEC	6 Hours of Spa-Francorchamps	(Belgium) Circuit de Spa-Francorchamps	20	(Germany) BMW M Team WRT	Hypercar
2026	WEC	6 Hours of São Paulo	(Brazil) Interlagos Circuit	15	(Germany) BMW M Team WRT	Hypercar
2026	IMSA	IMSA Battle on the Bricks	(United States) Indianapolis Motor Speedway	24	(United States) BMW M Team WRT	GTP
