= Sheldon van der Linde =

South African racing driver (born 1999)

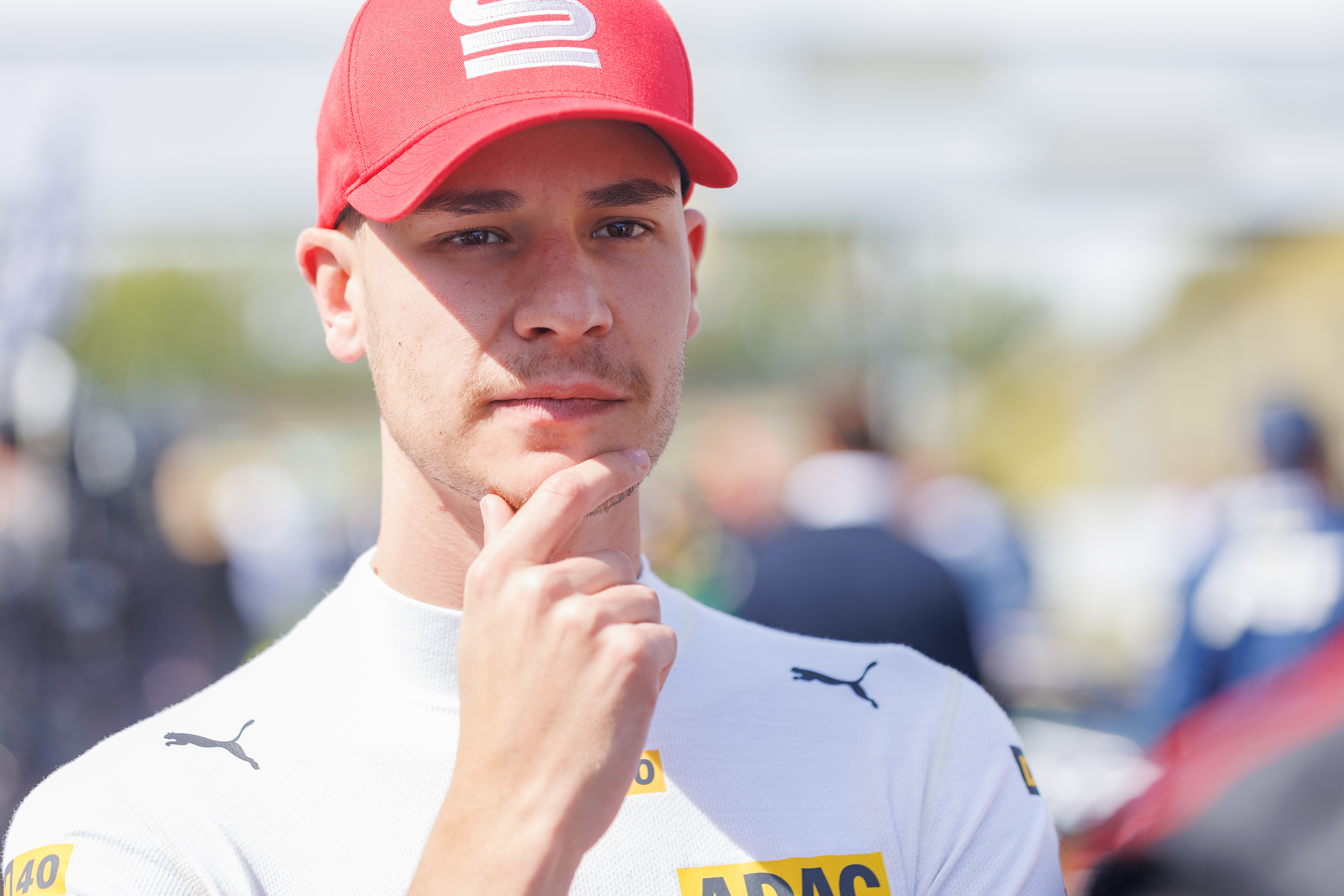
- van der Linde in 2024
- Nationality: (South Africa) South African
- Born: 13 May 1999 (age 27) Johannesburg, South Africa
- Relatives: Etienne van der Linde (uncle); Kelvin van der Linde (brother)

Deutsche Tourenwagen Masters career
- Debut season: 2019
- Current team: Schubert Motorsport
- Categorisation: FIA Silver (until 2019); FIA Gold (2020–2022); FIA Platinum (2023–)
- Car number: 31
- Former teams: BMW Team RBM, ROWE Racing
- Starts: 96
- Wins: 6
- Poles: 5
- Fastest laps: 6
- Best finish: 1st in 2022

Previous series
- 2017 2016 2015 2014: IMSA SportsCar Championship; ADAC GT Masters; TCR Benelux; Audi Sport TT Cup; Volkswagen Cup South Africa; South Africa Polo Cup Championship

Championship titles
- 2022 2015 2014: Deutsche Tourenwagen Masters; Volkswagen Cup South Africa; South Africa Polo Cup Championship

Sheldon van der Linde (born 13 May 1999), also known by his initials SVDL, is a South African motor racing driver currently employed by BMW as a factory driver. Van der Linde competed in DTM between 2019 and 2024, and in LMDh since 2024. He is the 2022 DTM champion and 2025 Bathurst 12 Hour winner, and the younger brother of Kelvin van der Linde.

== Career ==
Van der Linde began his motorsport career at the age of six, racing karts in his native South Africa. He would go on to win multiple national titles before making the transition to racing cars in 2014. In his first season of car racing, van der Linde won the South Africa Polo Cup Championship in dominant fashion. He would go on to win the Volkswagen Cup South Africa the following year.

For 2016, van der Linde raced in the Audi Sport TT Cup, one of the support categories of the Deutsche Tourenwagen Masters. He would make an immediate impact, winning both races of the opening round at the Hockenheimring. Scoring multiple podiums, as well as two wins, secured van der Linde fourth in his debut season. Thereafter, he has competed in the WeatherTech SportsCar Championship, ADAC GT Masters, and both Blancpain GT Series'.

=== DTM ===
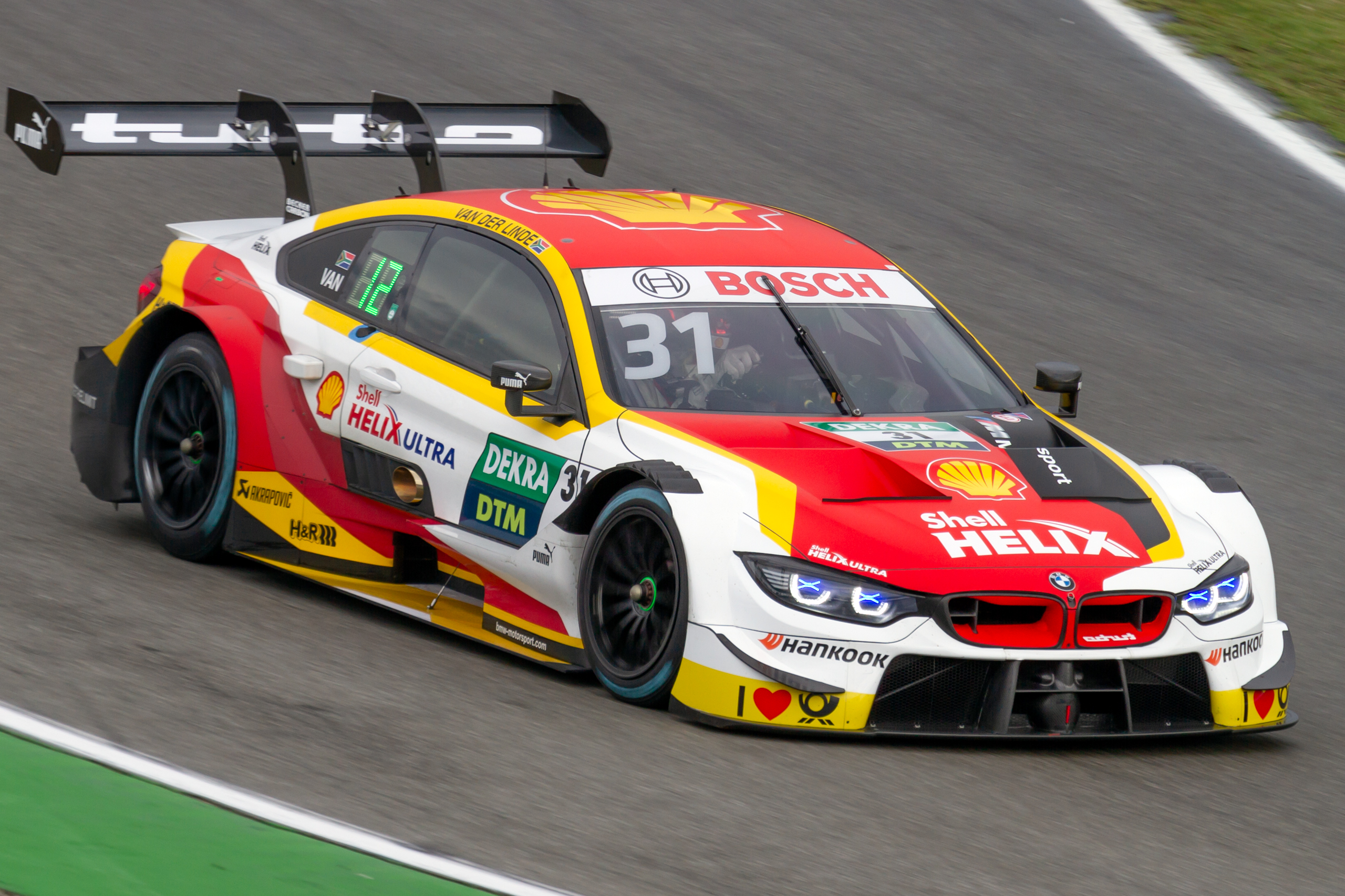
Van der Linde making his debut in the 2019 Deutsche Tourenwagen Masters.

==== 2019 ====
In January 2019, it was announced that van der Linde would be driving for BMW Team RBM in the 2019 Deutsche Tourenwagen Masters season; thereby making him the first South African driver to compete in the series. He scored a pole position at Zolder and finished 13th in the standings, 19 points behind teammate Joel Eriksson.

==== 2020 ====
Van der Linde remained with RBM for the 2020 season, this time alongside Philipp Eng. His season started out strongly, scoring his first DTM podium at the second round of the campaign at the Lausitzring. The South African followed that up by winning race 2 at Assen, a race in which he scored the fastest lap as well. A consistent season helped van der Linde to sixth in the championship, finishing as the second-highest BMW driver, narrowly missing out to Timo Glock.

==== 2021 ====
For 2021, the first DTM season to be run under Group GT3 regulations, van der Linde switched over to partner Glock at ROWE Racing as the team fielded a pair of BMW M6 GT3 cars in what proved to be their only season in the series. In the first seven races, he recorded five finishes in the top-ten. After a fourth-place finish in the second race of the first round at Monza, he started from pole position and led 21 laps in the first race of the second round at the Lausitzring, but eventually received a five-second time penalty for a pit-stop infringement and finished in ninth place. After experiencing his first retirement of the season in the second race of the fourth round at the Nürburgring, he also retired from both races of the next round at the Red Bull Ring. He finished sixth in the first race of the sixth round at Assen, before experiencing four consecutive retirements. His campaign ended with an eleventh-place finish in the drivers' standings, with the fourth-place finish at Monza remaining his best race result.

==== 2022 ====
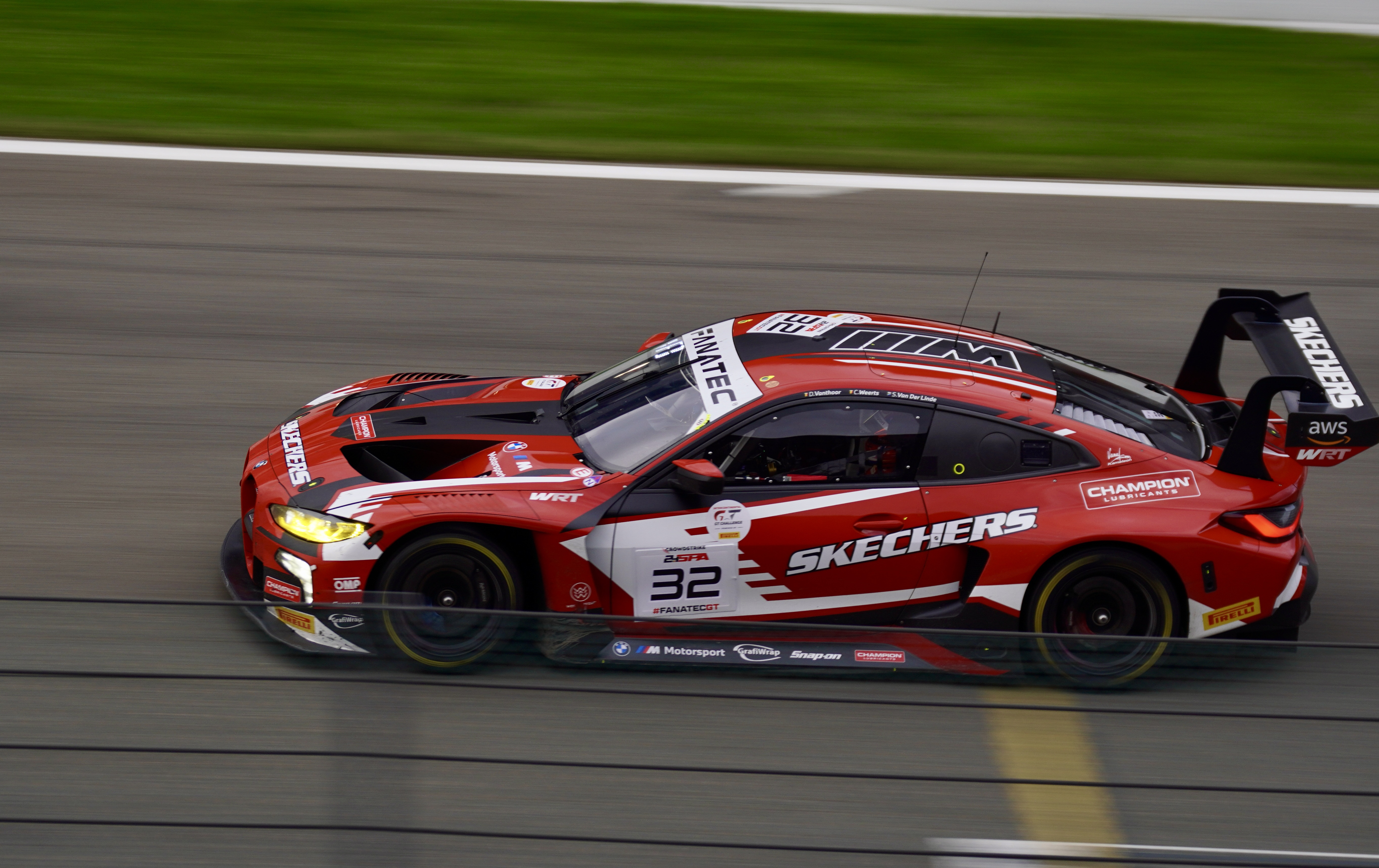
Team WRT's #32 BMW M4 GT3 driven by van der Linde, Vanthoor and Weerts during the 2023 24 Hours of Spa

For the 2022 season, van der Linde was chosen to partner Philipp Eng at Schubert Motorsport as the team entered the DTM for the first time by fielding a pair of BMW M4 GT3 cars. In the second round of the season at the Lausitzring, he won both races. He scored his third victory of the season in the first race of the fifth round at the Nürburgring, finishing ahead of his brother, Kelvin. It was the first time that two brothers finished 1–2 in a DTM race. Going into the final round at the Hockenheimring, van der Linde was 11 points ahead of Mercedes driver Lucas Auer in the drivers' standings. In the Saturday race, which Auer won, van der Linde finished second after starting from 16th due to a ten-place grid penalty. He went into the Sunday race two points ahead of Auer in the drivers' standings, eventually winning his maiden title with a third-place finish, which put him 11 points ahead of Auer, who finished the race in seventh, in the final drivers' standings.

=== Sports car racing ===
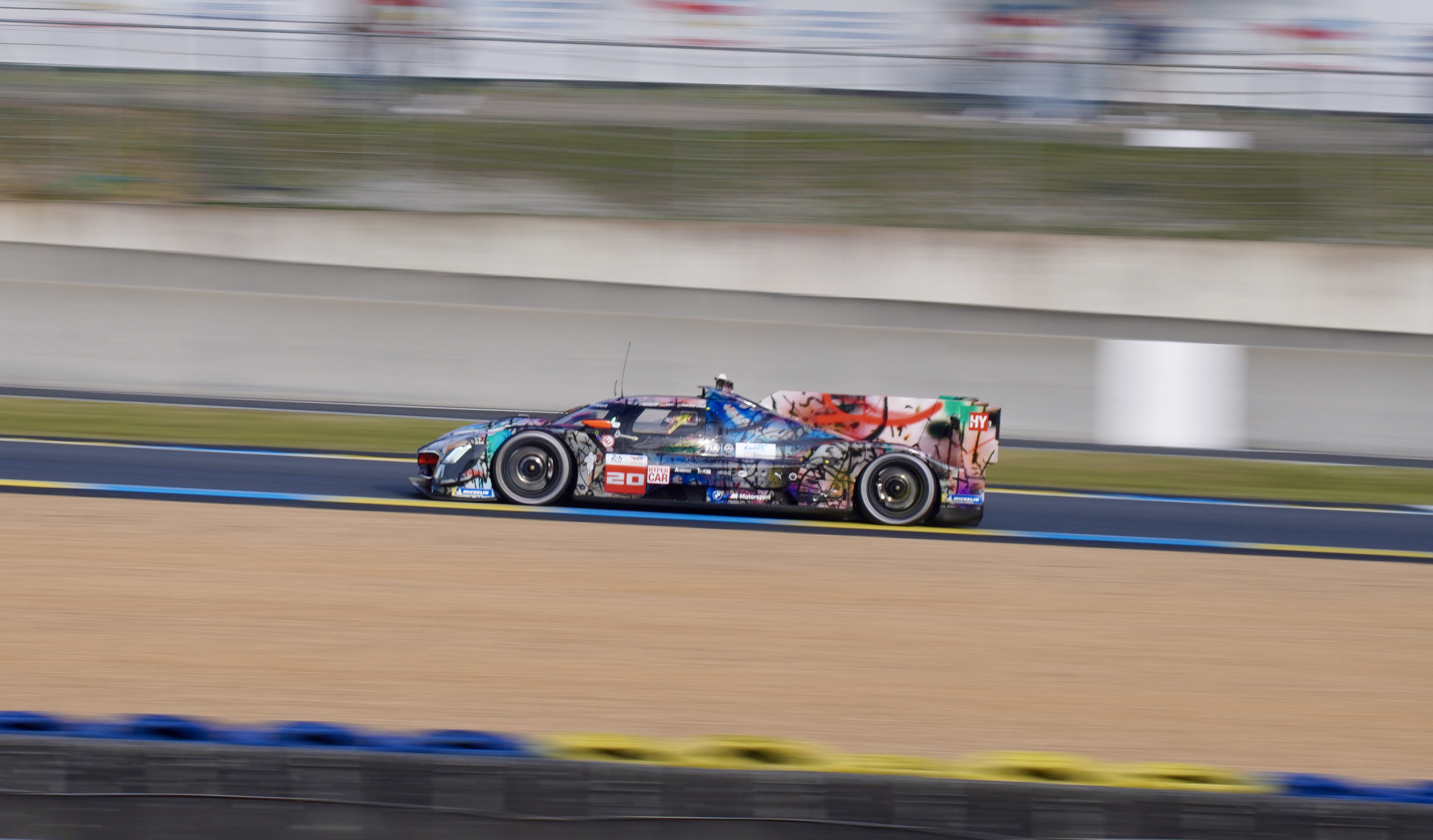
The #20 BMW M Hybrid V8 Art Car during practice at the 2024 24 Hours of Le Mans

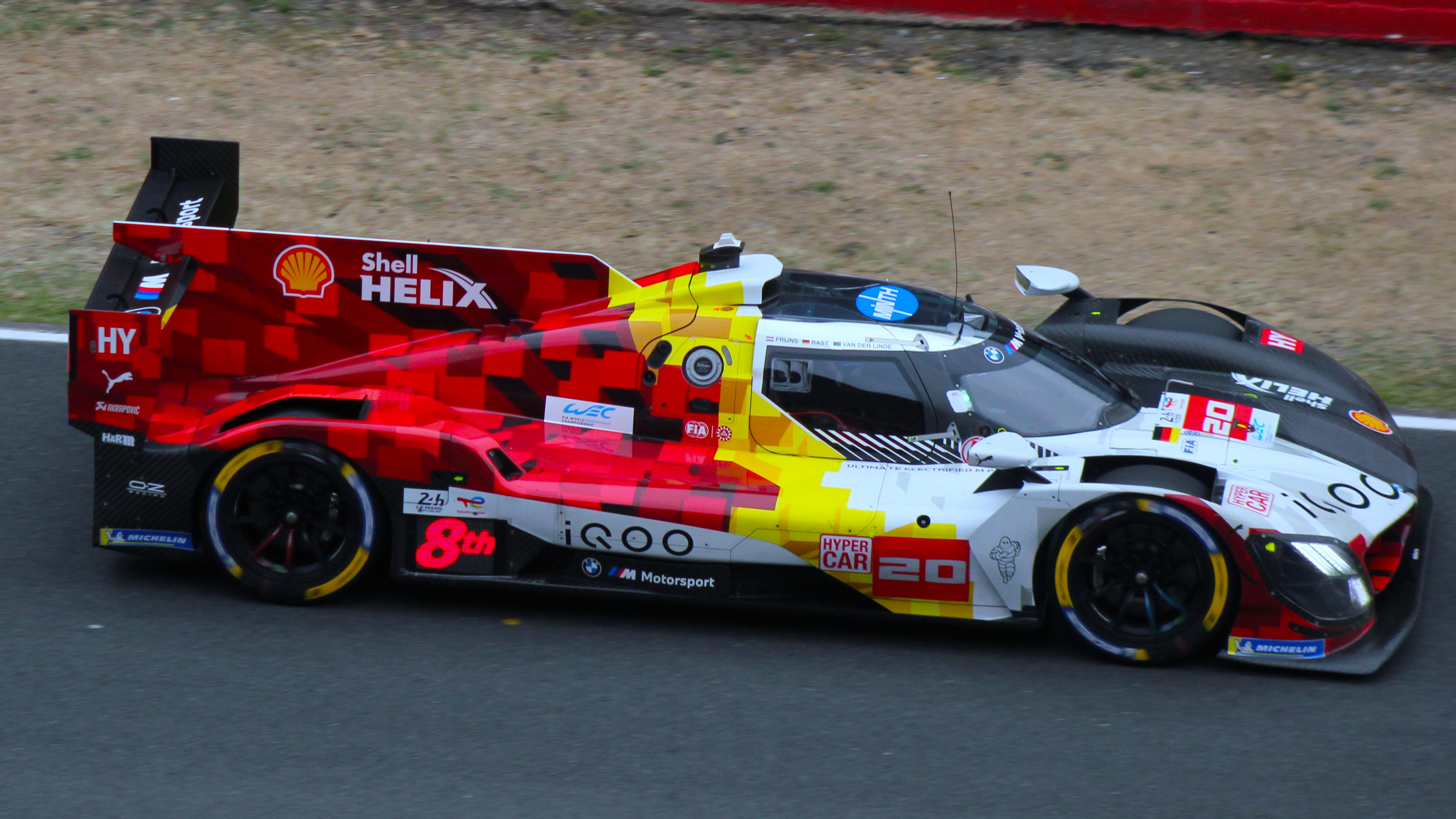
Van der Linde's No. 20 car at the 2025 24 Hours of Le Mans

On 2 February 2025, van der Linde scored the biggest win of his racing career to date when he took out the 2025 Bathurst 12 Hour at the famous Mount Panorama Circuit in Australia. Driving for Belgian outfit Team WRT and driving a BMW M4 GT3, he teamed with Brazilian driver Augusto Farfus and his older brother Kelvin to take a 10-second win over their WRT teammates Raffaele Marciello, Charles Weerts and former multiple MotoGP World Champion Valentino Rossi.

The win made the van der Linde's just the third set of brothers to win a major race together at Bathurst after Geoghegan's Leo and "Pete" (Ian) who won the 1962 Bathurst Six Hour Classic together, and the Brabham brothers Geoff and David who had won the 1997 AMP Bathurst 1000 Super Touring car race together.

After missing the opening round of the 2026 WEC season, van der Linde became the first South African to win a FIA World Endurance Championship race overall, taking victory at the 6 Hours of Spa-Francorchamps with Robin Frijns and René Rast.

=== Formula E ===
Van der Linde served as the reserve driver for the BMW i Andretti Motorsport during the 2020–21 Formula E season.

In April 2023, van der Linde made his debut in a Formula E car during the Berlin rookie test with Jaguar TCS Racing. He would later partake in the rookie test with the team in Rome. van der Linde returned with Jaguar and participated in the rookie free practice session in Misano and the Berlin rookie test.

== Racing record ==
=== Career summary ===
Season	Series	Team	Races	Wins	Poles	F/Laps	Podiums	Points	Position
2014	South Africa Polo Cup Championship	Ferodo Junior Racing Team	14	4	7	8	12	345	**1st**
2015	Volkswagen Cup South Africa	Signature Motorsport	?	?	?	?	?	?	**1st**
2016	Audi Sport TT Cup	Audi Sport	14	4	3	3	6	231	4th
2017	TCR BeNeLux Touring Car Championship	Comtoyou Racing	3	1	0	1	2	105	16th
2017	TCR BeNeLux Touring Car Championship - Junior	Comtoyou Racing	3	1	0	1	2	55	8th
2017	ADAC GT Masters	Aust Motorsport	2	0	0	0	0	20	27th
2017	ADAC TCR Germany Touring Car Championship	AC 1927 Mayen e.V. im ADAC	14	1	0	2	4	315	**3rd**
2017	IMSA SportsCar Championship - GTD	Montaplast by Land-Motorsport	1	1	0	0	1	36	52nd
2018	ADAC GT Masters	Montaplast by Land-Motorsport	14	1	0	0	6	136	**2nd**
2018	IMSA SportsCar Championship - GTD	Montaplast by Land-Motorsport	4	0	0	1	0	96	22nd
2018	Blancpain GT Series Endurance Cup	Montaplast by Land-Motorsport	1	0	0	0	1	34	10th
2018	Blancpain GT Series Endurance Cup	Belgian Audi Club Team WRT	4	0	0	0	0	34	10th
2018	Blancpain GT Series Sprint Cup	Belgian Audi Club Team WRT	2	0	0	0	0	6.5	21st
2018	Blancpain GT Series Sprint Cup - Silver Cup	Belgian Audi Club Team WRT	2	0	1	1	2	22.5	10th
2018	VLN Series - SP9	Audi Sport Team Land	5	0	1	0	0	16.58	8th
2018	24 Hours of Nürburgring - SP9	Audi Sport Team Land	1	0	0	0	0	N/A	5th
2019	Deutsche Tourenwagen Masters	BMW Team RBM	18	0	1	0	0	42	13th
2019	Intercontinental GT Challenge	BMW Team Schnitzer	1	0	0	0	0	6	22nd
2019	24 Hours of Nürburgring - SP9	BMW Team Schnitzer	1	0	0	0	0	N/A	DNF
2019	VLN Series - SP9	BMW Team Schnitzer	2	0	0	0	0	10.53	29th
2019	VLN Series - SP9	Falken Motorsports	1	0	0	0	0	10.53	29th
2020	Deutsche Tourenwagen Masters	BMW Team RBM	18	1	0	1	1	108	6th
2020	ADAC GT Masters	Schubert Motorsport	2	0	0	0	0	6	39th
2020	Intercontinental GT Challenge	Walkenhorst Motorsport	1	1	0	0	1	25	10th
2020	Nürburgring Langstrecken-Serie - SP9	BMW Team Schnitzer	3	0	0	0	0	22.65	14th
2020	24 Hours of Nürburgring - SP9	BMW Team Schnitzer	1	0	0	0	1	N/A	**3rd**
2020–21	Formula E	BMW i Andretti Motorsport	Reserve driver						
2021	Deutsche Tourenwagen Masters	Rowe Racing	16	0	1	1	0	55	11th
2021	24 Hours of Nürburgring - SP9	Rowe Racing	1	0	0	0	1	N/A	**2nd**
2021	GT World Challenge Europe Endurance Cup	Walkenhorst Motorsport	3	0	0	0	0	4	28th
2022	Deutsche Tourenwagen Masters	Schubert Motorsport	16	3	2	2	6	164	**1st**
2022	IMSA SportsCar Championship - GTD Pro	BMW M Team RLL	1	0	0	0	0	238	34th
2022	24 Hours of Nürburgring - SP9	Rowe Racing	1	0	0	0	0	N/A	DNF
2022–23	Formula E	Jaguar TCS Racing	Test driver						
2023	Deutsche Tourenwagen Masters	Schubert Motorsport	16	1	1	2	4	151	4th
2023	GT World Challenge Europe Endurance Cup	Team WRT	5	0	0	0	0	26	11th
2023	Intercontinental GT Challenge	Team WRT	5	2	0	2	2	68	5th
2023	FIA GT World Cup	Team WRT	1	0	0	0	0	N/A	16th
2023	IMSA SportsCar Championship - GTP	BMW M Team RLL	3	0	0	0	1	851	13th
2023	Nürburgring Langstrecken-Serie - SP9	Rowe Racing	2	0	1	0	0	0	NC†
2023	24 Hours of Nürburgring - SP9	Rowe Racing	1	0	0	0	1	N/A	**2nd**
2023–24	Formula E	Jaguar TCS Racing	Test driver						
2024	Deutsche Tourenwagen Masters	Schubert Motorsport	16	1	0	0	1	142	6th
2024	FIA World Endurance Championship - Hypercar	BMW M Team WRT	8	0	0	0	0	10	27th
2024	Intercontinental GT Challenge	BMW M Team WRT	1	0	1	0	0	0	NC*
2024	Intercontinental GT Challenge	Rowe Racing						0	NC*
2024	IMSA SportsCar Championship - GTD Pro	Paul Miller Racing	1	0	0	1	1	319	32nd
2024	GT World Challenge Europe Endurance Cup	Team WRT	5	0	0	0	2	48	7th
2024	GT World Challenge America - Pro	Team WRT	1	1	1	1	1	0	NC†
2024	FIA GT World Cup	Team WRT	1	0	0	0	0	N/A	**3rd**
2024	Nürburgring Langstrecken-Serie - SP9	Rowe Racing							
2024	24 Hours of Nürburgring - SP9	Rowe Racing	1	0	0	0	0	N/A	DNF
2025	IMSA SportsCar Championship - GTP	BMW M Team RLL	9	0	0	1	1	2469	8th
2025	FIA World Endurance Championship - Hypercar	BMW M Team WRT	7	0	0	0	1	47	9th
2025	GT World Challenge Europe Endurance Cup	Team WRT	1	0	0	0	0	4	25th
2025	Intercontinental GT Challenge	Team WRT	2	1	0	0	1	33	10th
2025	FIA GT World Cup	Team WRT	1	0	0	0	0	N/A	6th
2026	IMSA SportsCar Championship - GTP	BMW M Team WRT	9	1	0	1	3	2650	6th
2026	FIA World Endurance Championship - Hypercar	BMW M Team WRT	7	1	0	0	2	71	10th
2026	Nürburgring Langstrecken-Serie - SP9	Rowe Racing							
2026	24 Hours of Nürburgring - SP9	Rowe Racing	1	0	0	0	1	N/A	**3rd**
2026	FIA GT World Cup	Team WRT							

^{*} Season still in progress.

=== Complete ADAC GT Masters results ===
(key) (Races in bold indicate pole position; results in italics indicate fastest lap)

Year	Team	Car	1	2	3	4	5	6	7	8	9	10	11	12	13	14	DC	Points
2017	Aust Motorsport	Audi R8 LMS	OSC; 1	OSC; 2	LAU; 1	LAU; 2	RBR; 1	RBR; 2	ZAN; 1	ZAN; 2	NÜR; 1	NÜR; 2	SAC; 1; 4	SAC; 2; 6	HOC; 1	HOC; 2	27th	20
2018	Montaplast by Land-Motorsport	Audi R8 LMS	OSC; 1; 2	OSC; 2 Ret	MST; 1; 9	MST; 2; 8	RBR; 1; 5	RBR; 2; 13	NÜR; 1 Ret	NÜR; 2; 10	ZAN; 1; 2	ZAN; 2; 11	SAC; 1; 1	SAC; 2; 2	HOC; 1; 3	HOC; 2; 1	**2nd**	**136**
2020	Schubert Motorsport	BMW M6 GT3	LAU; 1	LAU; 2	NÜR; 1	NÜR; 2	HOC; 1	HOC; 2	SAC; 1	SAC; 2	RBR; 1	RBR; 2	LAU; 1; 18	LAU; 2; 10	OSC; 1	OSC; 2	39th	6

=== Complete IMSA SportsCar Championship results ===
(key) (Races in bold indicate pole position; results in italics indicate fastest lap)

Year	Team	Class	Make	Engine	1	2	3	4	5	6	7	8	9	10	11	12	Pos.	Points
2017	Montaplast by Land-Motorsport	GTD	Audi R8 LMS GT3	Audi 5.2 L V10	DAY	SEB	LBH	COA	DET	WGL	MOS	LIM	ELK	VIR	LGA	PET; 1	52nd	36
2018	Montaplast by Land-Motorsport	GTD	Audi R8 LMS GT3	Audi 5.2 L V10	DAY; 7	SEB; 4	MOH	DET	WGL; 12	MOS	LIM	ELK	VIR	LGA	PET; 6		22nd	96
2022	BMW M Team RLL	GTD Pro	BMW M4 GT3	BMW P58 3.0 L Turbo I6	DAY; 9	SEB	LBH	LGA	WGL	MOS	LIM	ELK	VIR	PET			34th	238
2023	BMW M Team RLL	GTP	BMW M Hybrid V8	BMW P66/3 4.0 L Turbo V8	DAY; 9	SEB; 2	LBH	LGA	WGL	MOS	ELK	IMS	PET; 7				13th	851
2024	Paul Miller Racing	GTD Pro	BMW M4 GT3	BMW P58 3.0 L Turbo I6	DAY; 3	SEB	LGA	DET	WGL	MOS	ELK	VIR	IMS	PET			32nd	319
2025	BMW M Team RLL	GTP	BMW M Hybrid V8	BMW P66/3 4.0 L Turbo V8	DAY; 7	SEB; 5	LBH; 5	LGA; 4	DET; 7	WGL; 12	ELK; 2	IMS; 6	PET; 11				8th	2469
2026	BMW M Team WRT	GTP	BMW M Hybrid V8	BMW P66/3 4.0 L Turbo V8	DAY; 3	SEB; 5	LBH; 5	LGA; 9	DET; 9	WGL; 4	ELK; 11	IMS; 1	PET; 2				6th	2650

^{*} Season still in progress.

=== Complete GT World Challenge Europe results ===
==== GT World Challenge Europe Endurance Cup ====
(key) (Races in bold indicate pole position; results in italics indicate fastest lap)

Year	Team	Car	Class	1	2	3	4	5	6	7	Pos.	Points
2018	Belgian Audi Club Team WRT	Audi R8 LMS	Pro	MNZ; 7	SIL; 12	LEC; 12				CAT; Ret	10th	34
2018	Montaplast by Land-Motorsport	Audi R8 LMS	Pro				SPA; 6H; 1	SPA; 12H; 9	SPA; 24H; 3		10th	34
2021	Walkenhorst Motorsport	BMW M6 GT3	Pro	MON; 26	LEC; 8	SPA; 6H; 11	SPA; 12H; Ret	SPA; 24H; Ret	NÜR	CAT	28th	4
2023	Team WRT	BMW M4 GT3	Pro	MNZ; 6	LEC; Ret	SPA; 6H; 1	SPA; 12H; 52†	SPA; 24H; Ret	NÜR; 7	CAT; 11	11th	26
2024	Team WRT	BMW M4 GT3	Pro	LEC; Ret	SPA; 6H; 15	SPA; 12H; 16	SPA; 24H; 3	NÜR; 44†	MNZ; 2	JED; 4	7th	48
2025	Team WRT	BMW M4 GT3 Evo	Pro	LEC	MNZ	SPA; 6H; 25	SPA; 12H; 17	SPA; 24H; 8	NÜR	CAT	25th	4

==== GT World Challenge Europe Sprint Cup ====
Year	Team	Car	Class	1	2	3	4	5	6	7	8	9	10	Pos.	Points
2018	Belgian Audi Club Team WRT	Audi R8 LMS	Silver	ZOL; 1	ZOL; 2	BRH; 1	BRH; 2	MIS; 1; 8	**MIS**; **2**; 6	HUN; 1	HUN; 2	NÜR; 1	NÜR; 2	10th	22.5

=== Complete Deutsche Tourenwagen Masters results ===
(key) (Races in bold indicate pole position) (Races in italics indicate fastest lap)

Year	Entrant	Chassis	1	2	3	4	5	6	7	8	9	10	11	12	13	14	15	16	17	18	Rank	Points
2019	BMW Team RBM	BMW M4 Turbo DTM	HOC; 1; 6	HOC; 2; 14	ZOL; 1; 11	**ZOL**; **2**; 5	MIS; 1; 9	MIS; 2; 9	NOR; 1 Ret	NOR; 2 Ret	ASS; 1; 10	ASS; 2; 15	BRH; 1; 8	BRH; 2; 7	LAU; 1; 16	LAU; 2; 11	NÜR; 1; 7	NÜR; 2; 16	HOC; 1; 16	HOC; 2; 13	13th	42
2020	BMW Team RBM	BMW M4 Turbo DTM	SPA; 1; 15	SPA; 2; 6	LAU; 1; 2	LAU; 2; 15	LAU; 1; 9	LAU; 2; 10	ASS; 1; 7	ASS; 2; 1	NÜR; 1; 8	NÜR; 2; 6	NÜR; 1; 8	NÜR; 2; 4	ZOL; 1; 6	ZOL; 2; 10	ZOL; 1; 13	ZOL; 2; 7	HOC; 1; 10	HOC; 2; 9	6th	108
2021	ROWE Racing	BMW M6 GT3	MNZ; 1; 11	MNZ; 2; 4^{3}	**LAU**; **1**; 9^{1}	LAU; 2; 5	ZOL; 1; 16	ZOL; 2; 7	NÜR; 1; 6	NÜR; 2 Ret	RBR; 1 Ret	RBR; 2 Ret^{3}	ASS; 1; 6	ASS; 2 Ret	HOC; 1 Ret	HOC; 2 Ret	NOR; 1 Ret	NOR; 2; 16			11th	55
2022	Schubert Motorsport	BMW M4 GT3	ALG; 1; 7	ALG; 2; 8	LAU; 1; 1^{2}	**LAU**; **2**; 1^{1}	IMO; 1; 8	IMO; 2; 5	NOR; 1 Ret	NOR; 2; 15	NÜR; 1; 1	**NÜR**; **2**; 9^{1}	SPA; 1; 12	SPA; 2; 2^{2}	RBR; 1; 11	RBR; 2; 11	HOC; 1; 2	HOC; 2; 3			1st	164
2023	Schubert Motorsport	BMW M4 GT3	OSC; 1 Ret	OSC; 2; 11	ZAN; 1; 2^{2}	ZAN; 2; 10	**NOR**; **1**; 1^{1}	NOR; 2; 3^{3}	NÜR; 1; 7	NÜR; 2; 17^{2}	LAU; 1; 5	LAU; 2; 13	SAC; 1; 6	SAC; 2 Ret	RBR; 1; 13	RBR; 2; 2^{2}	HOC; 1; 20	HOC; 2; 4			4th	151
2024	Schubert Motorsport	BMW M4 GT3	OSC; 1; 4	OSC; 2; 6	LAU; 1; 6	LAU; 2; 8	ZAN; 1; 6	ZAN; 2; 8	NOR; 1; 7^{2}	NOR; 2; 14	NÜR; 1; 13	NÜR; 2; 1	SAC; 1; 9	SAC; 2; 8	RBR; 1; 11	RBR; 2; 6	HOC; 1; 11	HOC; 2; 9			6th	142

=== Complete FIA World Endurance Championship results ===
(key) (Races in bold indicate pole position) (Races in italics indicate fastest lap)

Year	Entrant	Class	Chassis	Engine	1	2	3	4	5	6	7	8	Rank	Points
2024	BMW M Team WRT	Hypercar	BMW M Hybrid V8	BMW P66/3 4.0 L Turbo V8	QAT; 10	IMO; 6	SPA; 13	LMS; NC	SÃO; 14	COA; 13	FUJ; Ret	BHR; Ret	27th	10
2025	BMW M Team WRT	Hypercar	BMW M Hybrid V8	BMW P66/3 4.0 L Turbo V8	QAT; 7	IMO; 2	SPA	LMS; 16	SÃO; 5	COA; NC	FUJ; 8	BHR; 8	9th	47
2026	BMW M Team WRT	Hypercar	BMW M Hybrid V8	BMW P66/3 4.0 L Turbo V8	IMO	SPA; 1	LMS; 2	SÃO; 8	COA; 12	FUJ; 13	CAT; 14	MNZ; 7	10th	71

=== 24 Hours of Le Mans results ===
Year	Team	Co-Drivers	Car	Class	Laps	Pos.	Class Pos.
2024	(Belgium) BMW M Team WRT	(Netherlands) Robin Frijns (Germany) René Rast	BMW M Hybrid V8	Hypercar	96	NC	NC
2025	(Germany) BMW M Team WRT	(Netherlands) Robin Frijns (Germany) René Rast	BMW M Hybrid V8	Hypercar	375	17th	17th
2026	(Germany) BMW M Team WRT	(Netherlands) Robin Frijns (Germany) René Rast	BMW M Hybrid V8	Hypercar	381	**2nd**	**2nd**

=== 24 Hours of Daytona results ===
Year	Team	Co-Drivers	Car	Class	Laps	Pos.	Class Pos.
2018	(Germany) Montaplast by Land-Motorsport	(South Africa) Kelvin van der Linde (Germany) Christopher Mies (Switzerland) Jeffrey Schmidt	Audi R8 LMS	GTD	749	27th	7th
2022	(United States) BMW M Team RLL	(Austria) Philipp Eng (Germany) Marco Wittmann (United Kingdom) Nick Yelloly	BMW M4 GT3	GTD Pro	665	40th	9th
2023	(United States) BMW M Team RLL	(United States) Connor De Phillippi (United States) Colton Herta (United Kingdom) Nick Yelloly	BMW M Hybrid V8	GTP	652	48th	9th
2024	(United States) Paul Miller Racing	(United States) Bryan Sellers (United States) Madison Snow (United States) Neil Verhagen	BMW M4 GT3	GTD Pro	730	21st	**3rd**
2025	(United States) BMW M Team RLL	(Netherlands) Robin Frijns (Germany) René Rast (Germany) Marco Wittmann	BMW M Hybrid V8	GTP	777	7th	7th
2026	(Belgium) BMW M Team WRT	(Netherlands) Robin Frijns (Germany) René Rast (Belgium) Dries Vanthoor	BMW M Hybrid V8	GTP	705	**3rd**	**3rd**

=== Complete 24 Hours of Spa results ===
Year	Team	Co-Drivers	Car	Class	Laps	Pos.	Class Pos.
2018	(Germany) Montaplast by Land-Motorsport	(Switzerland) Jeffrey Schmidt (South Africa) Kelvin van der Linde	Audi R8 LMS	Pro	511	**3rd**	**3rd**
2021	(Germany) Walkenhorst Motorsport	(United Kingdom) David Pittard (Germany) Marco Wittmann	BMW M6 GT3	Pro	221	DNF	DNF
2023	(Belgium) Team WRT	(Belgium) Dries Vanthoor (Belgium) Charles Weerts	BMW M4 GT3	Pro	250	DNF	DNF
2024	(Belgium) Team WRT	(Belgium) Dries Vanthoor (Belgium) Charles Weerts	BMW M4 GT3	Pro	478	**3rd**	**3rd**
2025	(Germany) Team WRT	(Belgium) Dries Vanthoor (Germany) Marco Wittmann	BMW M4 GT3 Evo	Pro	548	8th	8th

=== 24 Hours of Nürburgring results ===
Year	Team	Co-Drivers	Car	Class	Laps	Pos.	Class Pos.
2018	(Germany) Audi Sport Team Land	(Germany) Christopher Mies (Germany) René Rast (South Africa) Kelvin van der Linde	Audi R8 LMS	SP9	133	5th	6th
2019	(Germany) BMW Team Schnitzer	(Brazil) Augusto Farfus (Germany) Timo Scheider (Germany) Martin Tomczyk	BMW M6 GT3	SP9	29	DNF	DNF
2020	(Germany) BMW Team Schnitzer	(Brazil) Augusto Farfus (Germany) Jens Klingmann (Germany) Martin Tomczyk	BMW M6 GT3	SP9	85	**3rd**	**3rd**
2021	(Germany) Rowe Racing	(United States) Connor De Phillippi (Germany) Martin Tomczyk (Germany) Marco Wittmann	BMW M6 GT3	SP9	59	**2nd**	**2nd**
2022	(Germany) Rowe Racing	(Netherlands) Nicky Catsburg (United States) John Edwards (Germany) Marco Wittmann	BMW M4 GT3	SP9 Pro	47	DNF	DNF
2023	(Germany) Rowe Racing	(Belgium) Maxime Martin (Belgium) Dries Vanthoor (Germany) Marco Wittmann	BMW M4 GT3	SP9 Pro	162	**2nd**	**2nd**
2024	(Germany) Rowe Racing	(Brazil) Augusto Farfus (Netherlands) Robin Frijns (Belgium) Dries Vanthoor	BMW M4 GT3	SP9 Pro	21	DNF	DNF
2026	(Germany) Rowe Racing	(United Kingdom) Dan Harper (Germany) Max Hesse (Belgium) Dries Vanthoor	BMW M4 GT3 Evo	SP9 Pro	156	**3rd**	**3rd**

=== 12 Hours of Sebring results ===
Year	Team	Co-Drivers	Car	Class	Laps	Pos.	Class Pos.
2018	(Germany) Montaplast by Land-Motorsport	(Germany) Christopher Mies (Belgium) Alessio Picariello	Audi R8 LMS	GTD	321	20th	4th
2023	(United States) BMW M Team RLL	(United States) Connor De Phillippi (United Kingdom) Nick Yelloly	BMW M Hybrid V8	GTP	322	**2nd**	**2nd**
2025	(United States) BMW M Team RLL	(Netherlands) Robin Frijns (Germany) Marco Wittmann	BMW M Hybrid V8	GTP	353	5th	5th

=== Bathurst 12 Hour results ===
Year	Team	Co-Drivers	Car	Class	Laps	Pos.	Class Pos.
2023	(Belgium) Team WRT	(Belgium) Dries Vanthoor (Belgium) Charles Weerts	BMW M4 GT3	Pro	323	4th	4th
2024	(Belgium) Team WRT	(Belgium) Dries Vanthoor (Belgium) Charles Weerts	BMW M4 GT3	Pro	120	DNF	DNF
2025	(Belgium) Team WRT	(South Africa) Kelvin van der Linde (Brazil) Augusto Farfus	BMW M4 GT3	Pro	306	**1st**	**1st**

Sporting positions
Preceded by Maximilian Götz	Deutsche Tourenwagen Masters; Champion; 2022	Succeeded by Thomas Preining
Awards and achievements
Preceded by Maro Engel	Allan Simonsen Trophy (Pole position Bathurst 12 Hour); 2024	Succeeded by Lucas Auer
