= 2024 6 Hours of Imola =

Endurance sportscar racing event

(Italy) 2024 6 Hours of Imola
Event information
- Round 2 of 8 in the 2024 FIA World Endurance Championship
- Date: 21 April 2024
- Location: Imola
- Venue: Autodromo Internazionale Enzo e Dino Ferrari
- Duration: 6 hours

Results
- Laps completed: 205
- Distance (km): 1006.345
- Distance (miles): 625.25
- Hypercar

Pole position
- Time: 1:29.466
- Team: (Italy) Ferrari AF Corse

Winners
- Team: (Japan) Toyota Gazoo Racing
- Drivers: (United Kingdom) Mike Conway (Japan) Kamui Kobayashi (Netherlands) Nyck de Vries
- LMGT3

Winners
- Team: (Belgium) Team WRT
- Drivers: (Brazil) Augusto Farfus (Indonesia) Sean Gelael (United Kingdom) Darren Leung

The 2024 6 Hours of Imola was an endurance sportscar racing event held on 21 April 2024, as the second of eight rounds of the 2024 FIA World Endurance Championship. It was the second running of the event, and the first running of the event as part of the World Endurance Championship.

== Background ==
The event was announced on 9 June 2023, during the 2023 24 Hours of Le Mans weekend. The Italian round of the World Endurance Championship was held at Monza in July between 2021 and 2023. To accommodate an additional non-European race, the Italian round was moved from July to April. Since the Monza circuit is currently undergoing upgrade works, the round was moved from Monza to Imola.

Prior to the race, Peugeot unveiled their updated Peugeot 9X8, including a rear wing and a change in tire size: the front tires having a tread width of 29 centimeters, and the rear tires having a tread width of 34 centimeters, aligning with the rest of the Hypercar field.

== Entry list ==
The entry list was revealed on 2 April 2024, with 19 entries in the Hypercar category, and 18 entries in the LMGT3 category. In Hypercar, the No. 2 Cadillac Racing entry dropped from three to two drivers: Sébastien Bourdais did not drive for the team in Imola. Furthermore, Ferdinand Habsburg was replaced by Jules Gounon in the No. 35 Alpine Endurance Team entry, since the former was still recovering from an injury. All other entered teams and drivers stayed the same as in Qatar.

== Schedule ==
Date	Time (local: CEST)	Event
Friday, 19 April	12:00	Free Practice 1
Friday, 19 April	17:15	Free Practice 2
Saturday, 20 April	11:10	Free Practice 3
Saturday, 20 April	14:45	Qualifying - LMGT3
Saturday, 20 April	15:05	Hyperpole - LMGT3
Saturday, 20 April	15:25	Qualifying - Hypercar
Saturday, 20 April	15:45	Hyperpole - Hypercar
Sunday, 21 April	13:00	Race

== Practice ==
There are three practice sessions scheduled to be held preceding the start of the race on Sunday: two on Friday and one on Saturday. The sessions on Friday afternoon and Friday evening lasted 90 minutes, and the final session on Saturday morning lasted for 60 minutes.

=== Practice 1 ===
The first practice session took place at 12:00 CEST on Friday. Yifei Ye was quickest in the No. 83 AF Corse Ferrari, with a lap time of 1:31.347. Antonio Fuoco ended up second fastest in the No. 50 Ferrari AF Corse entry, with Mikkel Jensen in the No. 93 Peugeot TotalEnergies entry in third. LMGT3 was led by Daniel Juncadella in the No. 82 TF Sport Corvette, lapping the circuit in 1 minute and 42.113 seconds, with teammate Charlie Eastwood in the No. 81 Corvette second, 0.606s behind. Davide Rigon was third-quickest in the No. 54 Vista AF Corse Ferrari, 0.858s slower than Juncadella. The session saw one red flag, after Jean-Éric Vergne's No. 93 Peugeot suddenly stopped on-track.

Class	No.	Entrant	Driver	Time
Hypercar	83	(Italy) AF Corse	(China) Yifei Ye	1:31.347
LMGT3	82	(United Kingdom) TF Sport	(Spain) Daniel Juncadella	1:42.113

- Note: Only the fastest car in each class is shown.

=== Practice 2 ===
The second practice session took place at 17:15 CEST on Friday. Fuoco was quickest in the No. 50 Ferrari with a lap time of 1:30.957. Kévin Estre was second in the No. 6 Porsche Penske Motorsport entry, 0.342s behind. Robert Shwartzman ended up third in the No. 83 Ferrari. Eastwood was quickest in LMGT3 in the No. 81 Corvette, with a lap of 1:41.986, which was 0.187s faster than Alessio Rovera's lap in the No. 55 Vista AF Corse Ferrari. Juncadella was third-quickest in the No. 82 Corvette.

Class	No.	Entrant	Driver	Time
Hypercar	50	(Italy) Ferrari AF Corse	(Italy) Antonio Fuoco	1:30.957
LMGT3	81	(United Kingdom) TF Sport	(Republic of Ireland) Charlie Eastwood	1:41.986

- Note: Only the fastest car in each class is shown.

=== Final practice ===
The third and final practice session took place at 11:10 CEST on Saturday. Fuoco was once again quickest in the No. 50 Ferrari, with a lap of 1:31.238. He was 0.034s quicker than Dries Vanthoor in the No. 15 BMW M Team WRT entry, with team-mate René Rast in the No. 20 BMW a further 0.271s behind. In LMGT3, Marco Sørensen was quickest in the No. 777 D'station Racing Aston Martin, lapping the track in 1 minute and 42.474 seconds. He was half a second quicker than Daniel Mancinelli in the No. 27 Heart of Racing Team Aston Martin, with Augusto Farfus in the No. 31 Team WRT BMW in third. The session saw one stoppage, when Paul di Resta beached his No. 94 Peugeot TotalEnergies entry in the gravel at turn 18.

Class	No.	Entrant	Driver	Time
Hypercar	50	(Italy) Ferrari AF Corse	(Italy) Antonio Fuoco	1:31.238
LMGT3	777	(Japan) D'station Racing	(Denmark) Marco Sørensen	1:42.474

- Note: Only the fastest car in each class is shown.

== Qualifying ==
=== Qualifying results ===
Pole position winners in each class are marked in bold.

Pos	Class	No.	Entrant	Qualifying	Hyperpole	Grid
1	**Hypercar**	**50**	**(Italy) Ferrari AF Corse**	**1:30.196**	**1:29.466**	1
2	Hypercar	83	(Italy) AF Corse	1:30.710	1:29.885	2
3	Hypercar	51	(Italy) Ferrari AF Corse	1:30.736	1:29.953	3
4	Hypercar	6	(Germany) Porsche Penske Motorsport	1:31.190	1:30.101	4
5	Hypercar	5	(Germany) Porsche Penske Motorsport	1:30.221	1:30.385	5
6	Hypercar	7	(Japan) Toyota Gazoo Racing	1:30.636	1:30.410	6
7	Hypercar	20	(Belgium) BMW M Team WRT	1:30.950	1:30.600	7
8	Hypercar	8	(Japan) Toyota Gazoo Racing	1:30.497	1:30.652	8
9	Hypercar	12	(United Kingdom) Hertz Team Jota	1:30.992	1:30.656	9
10	Hypercar	99	(Germany) Proton Competition	1:30.929	1:30.692	10
11	Hypercar	38	(United Kingdom) Hertz Team Jota	1:31.322		11
12	Hypercar	2	(United States) Cadillac Racing	1:31.397		12
13	Hypercar	15	(Belgium) BMW M Team WRT	1:31.549		13
14	Hypercar	94	(France) Peugeot TotalEnergies	1:31.651		14
15	Hypercar	93	(France) Peugeot TotalEnergies	1:31.748		15
16	Hypercar	63	(Italy) Lamborghini Iron Lynx	1:31.862		16
17	Hypercar	35	(France) Alpine Endurance Team	1:31.980		17
18	Hypercar	36	(France) Alpine Endurance Team	1:32.054		18
19	Hypercar	11	(Italy) Isotta Fraschini	1:33.575		19
20	**LMGT3**	**92**	**(Lithuania) Manthey PureRxcing**	**1:42.734**	**1:42.365**	20
21	LMGT3	27	(United States) Heart of Racing Team	1:43.452	1:43.058	21
22	LMGT3	46	(Belgium) Team WRT	1:43.241	1:43.099	22
23	LMGT3	31	(Belgium) Team WRT	1:43.281	1:43.105	23
24	LMGT3	85	(Italy) Iron Dames	1:42.924	1:43.151	24
25	LMGT3	88	(Germany) Proton Competition	1:43.416	1:43.229	25
26	LMGT3	91	(Germany) Manthey EMA	1:43.134	1:43.399	26
27	LMGT3	55	(Italy) Vista AF Corse	1:43.198	1:43.523	27
28	LMGT3	54	(Italy) Vista AF Corse	1:43.225	1:43.650	28
29	LMGT3	59	(United Kingdom) United Autosports	1:43.882	1:43.835	29
30	LMGT3	81	(United Kingdom) TF Sport	1:43.897		30
31	LMGT3	777	(Japan) D'station Racing	1:43.947		31
32	LMGT3	82	(United Kingdom) TF Sport	1:44.108		32
33	LMGT3	77	(Germany) Proton Competition	1:44.118		33
34	LMGT3	95	(United Kingdom) United Autosports	1:44.291		34
35	LMGT3	78	(France) Akkodis ASP Team	1:44.347		35
36	LMGT3	60	(Italy) Iron Lynx	1:46.254		36
37	LMGT3	87	(France) Akkodis ASP Team	No time (Note: The No. 87 Akkodis ASP Team entry had all its lap times deleted due to a faulty sensor.)		37

== Race ==
=== Race results ===
The minimum number of laps for classification (70% of overall winning car's distance) was 143 laps. Class winners are in bold and ‡.

Final race classification
Pos	Class	No	Team	Drivers	Chassis	Tyre	Laps	Time/Retired
Pos	Class	No	Team	Drivers	Engine	Tyre	Laps	Time/Retired
1	**Hypercar**	**7**	**(Japan) Toyota Gazoo Racing**	**(United Kingdom) Mike Conway (Japan) Kamui Kobayashi (Netherlands) Nyck de Vries**	**Toyota GR010 Hybrid**	MI	**205**	**6:00:34.717‡**
1	**Hypercar**	**7**	**(Japan) Toyota Gazoo Racing**	**(United Kingdom) Mike Conway (Japan) Kamui Kobayashi (Netherlands) Nyck de Vries**	**Toyota H8909 3.5 L Turbo V6**	MI	**205**	**6:00:34.717‡**
2	Hypercar	6	(Germany) Porsche Penske Motorsport	(France) Kévin Estre (Germany) André Lotterer (Belgium) Laurens Vanthoor	Porsche 963	MI	205	+7.081 (Note: The No. 6 Porsche Penske Motorsport entry received a 5-second time penalty for overtaking under the safety car. The car kept its second-place position.)
2	Hypercar	6	(Germany) Porsche Penske Motorsport	(France) Kévin Estre (Germany) André Lotterer (Belgium) Laurens Vanthoor	Porsche 9RD 4.6 L Turbo V8	MI	205	+7.081
3	Hypercar	5	(Germany) Porsche Penske Motorsport	(Australia) Matt Campbell (Denmark) Michael Christensen (France) Frédéric Makowiecki	Porsche 963	MI	205	+25.626
3	Hypercar	5	(Germany) Porsche Penske Motorsport	(Australia) Matt Campbell (Denmark) Michael Christensen (France) Frédéric Makowiecki	Porsche 9RD 4.6 L Turbo V8	MI	205	+25.626
4	Hypercar	50	(Italy) Ferrari AF Corse	(Italy) Antonio Fuoco (Spain) Miguel Molina (Denmark) Nicklas Nielsen	Ferrari 499P	MI	205	+31.469
4	Hypercar	50	(Italy) Ferrari AF Corse	(Italy) Antonio Fuoco (Spain) Miguel Molina (Denmark) Nicklas Nielsen	Ferrari F163 3.0 L Turbo V6	MI	205	+31.469
5	Hypercar	8	(Japan) Toyota Gazoo Racing	(Switzerland) Sébastien Buemi (New Zealand) Brendon Hartley (Japan) Ryo Hirakawa	Toyota GR010 Hybrid	MI	205	+33.777
5	Hypercar	8	(Japan) Toyota Gazoo Racing	(Switzerland) Sébastien Buemi (New Zealand) Brendon Hartley (Japan) Ryo Hirakawa	Toyota H8909 3.5 L Turbo V6	MI	205	+33.777
6	Hypercar	20	(Belgium) BMW M Team WRT	(Netherlands) Robin Frijns (South Africa) Sheldon van der Linde (Germany) René Rast	BMW M Hybrid V8	MI	204	+1 Lap
6	Hypercar	20	(Belgium) BMW M Team WRT	(Netherlands) Robin Frijns (South Africa) Sheldon van der Linde (Germany) René Rast	BMW P66/3 4.0 L Turbo V8	MI	204	+1 Lap
7	Hypercar	51	(Italy) Ferrari AF Corse	(United Kingdom) James Calado (Italy) Antonio Giovinazzi (Italy) Alessandro Pier Guidi	Ferrari 499P	MI	204	+1 Lap
7	Hypercar	51	(Italy) Ferrari AF Corse	(United Kingdom) James Calado (Italy) Antonio Giovinazzi (Italy) Alessandro Pier Guidi	Ferrari F163 3.0 L Turbo V6	MI	204	+1 Lap
8	Hypercar	83	(Italy) AF Corse	(Poland) Robert Kubica (Israel) Robert Shwartzman (China) Yifei Ye	Ferrari 499P	MI	204	+1 Lap
8	Hypercar	83	(Italy) AF Corse	(Poland) Robert Kubica (Israel) Robert Shwartzman (China) Yifei Ye	Ferrari F163 3.0 L Turbo V6	MI	204	+1 Lap
9	Hypercar	93	(France) Peugeot TotalEnergies	(Denmark) Mikkel Jensen (Switzerland) Nico Müller (France) Jean-Éric Vergne	Peugeot 9X8 2024	MI	203	+2 Laps
9	Hypercar	93	(France) Peugeot TotalEnergies	(Denmark) Mikkel Jensen (Switzerland) Nico Müller (France) Jean-Éric Vergne	Peugeot X6H 2.6 L Turbo V6	MI	203	+2 Laps
10	Hypercar	2	(United States) Cadillac Racing	(New Zealand) Earl Bamber (United Kingdom) Alex Lynn	Cadillac V-Series.R	MI	203	+2 Laps
10	Hypercar	2	(United States) Cadillac Racing	(New Zealand) Earl Bamber (United Kingdom) Alex Lynn	Cadillac LMC55R 5.5 L V8	MI	203	+2 Laps
11	Hypercar	38	(United Kingdom) Hertz Team Jota	(United Kingdom) Jenson Button (United Kingdom) Philip Hanson (Denmark) Oliver Rasmussen	Porsche 963	MI	203	+2 Laps
11	Hypercar	38	(United Kingdom) Hertz Team Jota	(United Kingdom) Jenson Button (United Kingdom) Philip Hanson (Denmark) Oliver Rasmussen	Porsche 9RD 4.6 L Turbo V8	MI	203	+2 Laps
12	Hypercar	63	(Italy) Lamborghini Iron Lynx	(Italy) Mirko Bortolotti; Daniil Kvyat (Italy) Edoardo Mortara	Lamborghini SC63	MI	203	+2 Laps
12	Hypercar	63	(Italy) Lamborghini Iron Lynx	(Italy) Mirko Bortolotti; Daniil Kvyat (Italy) Edoardo Mortara	Lamborghini 3.8 L Turbo V8	MI	203	+2 Laps
13	Hypercar	35	(France) Alpine Endurance Team	(France) Paul-Loup Chatin (France) Jules Gounon (France) Charles Milesi	Alpine A424	MI	201	+4 Laps (Note: The Nos. 35 and 36 Alpine Endurance Team entries initially received penalties for not reaching the minimum drive time with Jules Gounon and Nicolas Lapierre, respectively. However, this decision was later reverted by the stewards.)
13	Hypercar	35	(France) Alpine Endurance Team	(France) Paul-Loup Chatin (France) Jules Gounon (France) Charles Milesi	Alpine V634 3.4 L Turbo V6	MI	201	+4 Laps
14	Hypercar	12	(United Kingdom) Hertz Team Jota	(United Kingdom) Callum Ilott (France) Norman Nato (United Kingdom) Will Stevens	Porsche 963	MI	200	+5 Laps
14	Hypercar	12	(United Kingdom) Hertz Team Jota	(United Kingdom) Callum Ilott (France) Norman Nato (United Kingdom) Will Stevens	Porsche 9RD 4.6 L Turbo V8	MI	200	+5 Laps
15	Hypercar	94	(France) Peugeot TotalEnergies	(United Kingdom) Paul di Resta (France) Loïc Duval (Belgium) Stoffel Vandoorne	Peugeot 9X8 2024	MI	199	+6 Laps
15	Hypercar	94	(France) Peugeot TotalEnergies	(United Kingdom) Paul di Resta (France) Loïc Duval (Belgium) Stoffel Vandoorne	Peugeot X6H 2.6 L Turbo V6	MI	199	+6 Laps
16	Hypercar	36	(France) Alpine Endurance Team	(France) Nicolas Lapierre (Germany) Mick Schumacher (France) Matthieu Vaxivière	Alpine A424	MI	199	+6 Laps
16	Hypercar	36	(France) Alpine Endurance Team	(France) Nicolas Lapierre (Germany) Mick Schumacher (France) Matthieu Vaxivière	Alpine V634 3.4 L Turbo V6	MI	199	+6 Laps
17	Hypercar	11	(Italy) Isotta Fraschini	(United States) Carl Bennett (Canada) Antonio Serravalle (France) Jean-Karl Vernay	Isotta Fraschini Tipo 6-C	MI	191	+14 Laps
17	Hypercar	11	(Italy) Isotta Fraschini	(United States) Carl Bennett (Canada) Antonio Serravalle (France) Jean-Karl Vernay	Isotta Fraschini 3.0 L Turbo V6	MI	191	+14 Laps
18	**LMGT3**	**31**	**(Belgium) Team WRT**	**(Brazil) Augusto Farfus (Indonesia) Sean Gelael (United Kingdom) Darren Leung**	**BMW M4 GT3**	G	**187**	**+18 Laps‡**
18	**LMGT3**	**31**	**(Belgium) Team WRT**	**(Brazil) Augusto Farfus (Indonesia) Sean Gelael (United Kingdom) Darren Leung**	**BMW P58 3.0 L Turbo I6**	G	**187**	**+18 Laps‡**
19	LMGT3	46	(Belgium) Team WRT	(Oman) Ahmad Al Harthy (Belgium) Maxime Martin (Italy) Valentino Rossi	BMW M4 GT3	G	187	+18 Laps
19	LMGT3	46	(Belgium) Team WRT	(Oman) Ahmad Al Harthy (Belgium) Maxime Martin (Italy) Valentino Rossi	BMW P58 3.0 L Turbo I6	G	187	+18 Laps
20	LMGT3	92	(Lithuania) Manthey PureRxcing	(Austria) Klaus Bachler (Saint Kitts and Nevis) Alex Malykhin (Germany) Joel Sturm	Porsche 911 GT3 R (992)	G	186	+19 Laps
20	LMGT3	92	(Lithuania) Manthey PureRxcing	(Austria) Klaus Bachler (Saint Kitts and Nevis) Alex Malykhin (Germany) Joel Sturm	Porsche M97/80 4.2 L Flat-6	G	186	+19 Laps
21	LMGT3	55	(Italy) Vista AF Corse	(France) François Heriau (United States) Simon Mann (Italy) Alessio Rovera	Ferrari 296 GT3	G	186	+19 Laps
21	LMGT3	55	(Italy) Vista AF Corse	(France) François Heriau (United States) Simon Mann (Italy) Alessio Rovera	Ferrari F163CE 3.0 L Turbo V6	G	186	+19 Laps
22	LMGT3	27	(United States) Heart of Racing Team	(United Kingdom) Ian James (Italy) Daniel Mancinelli (Spain) Alex Riberas	Aston Martin Vantage AMR GT3 Evo	G	185	+20 Laps (Note: The No. 27 Heart of Racing Team entry received a 10-second time penalty for leaving its engine running whilst refuelling. The car kept its position of fifth in class.)
22	LMGT3	27	(United States) Heart of Racing Team	(United Kingdom) Ian James (Italy) Daniel Mancinelli (Spain) Alex Riberas	Aston Martin M177 4.0 L Turbo V8	G	185	+20 Laps
23	LMGT3	95	(United Kingdom) United Autosports	(United Kingdom) Josh Caygill (Chile) Nico Pino (Japan) Marino Sato	McLaren 720S GT3 Evo	G	185	+20 Laps
23	LMGT3	95	(United Kingdom) United Autosports	(United Kingdom) Josh Caygill (Chile) Nico Pino (Japan) Marino Sato	McLaren M840T 4.0 L Turbo V8	G	185	+20 Laps
24	LMGT3	81	(United Kingdom) TF Sport	(Angola) Rui Andrade (Republic of Ireland) Charlie Eastwood (Belgium) Tom van Rompuy	Chevrolet Corvette Z06 GT3.R	G	185	+20 Laps
24	LMGT3	81	(United Kingdom) TF Sport	(Angola) Rui Andrade (Republic of Ireland) Charlie Eastwood (Belgium) Tom van Rompuy	Chevrolet LT6.R 5.5 L V8	G	185	+20 Laps
25	LMGT3	82	(United Kingdom) TF Sport	(France) Sébastien Baud (Spain) Daniel Juncadella (Japan) Hiroshi Koizumi	Chevrolet Corvette Z06 GT3.R	G	185	+20 Laps
25	LMGT3	82	(United Kingdom) TF Sport	(France) Sébastien Baud (Spain) Daniel Juncadella (Japan) Hiroshi Koizumi	Chevrolet LT6.R 5.5 L V8	G	185	+20 Laps
26	LMGT3	77	(Germany) Proton Competition	(United Kingdom) Ben Barker (United States) Ryan Hardwick (Canada) Zacharie Robichon	Ford Mustang GT3	G	184	+21 Laps
26	LMGT3	77	(Germany) Proton Competition	(United Kingdom) Ben Barker (United States) Ryan Hardwick (Canada) Zacharie Robichon	Ford Coyote 5.4 L V8	G	184	+21 Laps
27	LMGT3	777	(Japan) D'station Racing	(France) Erwan Bastard (France) Clément Mateu (Denmark) Marco Sørensen	Aston Martin Vantage AMR GT3 Evo	G	184	+21 Laps
27	LMGT3	777	(Japan) D'station Racing	(France) Erwan Bastard (France) Clément Mateu (Denmark) Marco Sørensen	Aston Martin M177 4.0 L Turbo V8	G	184	+21 Laps
28	LMGT3	59	(United Kingdom) United Autosports	(Brazil) Nicolas Costa (United Kingdom) James Cottingham (Switzerland) Grégoire Saucy	McLaren 720S GT3 Evo	G	184	+21 Laps
28	LMGT3	59	(United Kingdom) United Autosports	(Brazil) Nicolas Costa (United Kingdom) James Cottingham (Switzerland) Grégoire Saucy	McLaren M840T 4.0 L Turbo V8	G	184	+21 Laps
29	LMGT3	54	(Italy) Vista AF Corse	(Italy) Francesco Castellacci (Switzerland) Thomas Flohr (Italy) Davide Rigon	Ferrari 296 GT3	G	184	+21 Laps
29	LMGT3	54	(Italy) Vista AF Corse	(Italy) Francesco Castellacci (Switzerland) Thomas Flohr (Italy) Davide Rigon	Ferrari F163CE 3.0 L Turbo V6	G	184	+21 Laps
30	LMGT3	60	(Italy) Iron Lynx	(Italy) Matteo Cressoni (France) Franck Perera (Italy) Claudio Schiavoni	Lamborghini Huracán GT3 Evo 2	G	183	+22 Laps
30	LMGT3	60	(Italy) Iron Lynx	(Italy) Matteo Cressoni (France) Franck Perera (Italy) Claudio Schiavoni	Lamborghini DGF 5.2 L V10	G	183	+22 Laps
31	LMGT3	78	(France) Akkodis ASP Team	Timur Boguslavskiy (South Africa) Kelvin van der Linde (France) Arnold Robin	Lexus RC F GT3	G	183	+22 Laps
31	LMGT3	78	(France) Akkodis ASP Team	Timur Boguslavskiy (South Africa) Kelvin van der Linde (France) Arnold Robin	Lexus 2UR-GSE 5.4 L V8	G	183	+22 Laps
32	LMGT3	87	(France) Akkodis ASP Team	(Japan) Takeshi Kimura (Argentina) José María López (France) Esteban Masson	Lexus RC F GT3	G	182	+23 Laps
32	LMGT3	87	(France) Akkodis ASP Team	(Japan) Takeshi Kimura (Argentina) José María López (France) Esteban Masson	Lexus 2UR-GSE 5.4 L V8	G	182	+23 Laps
33	LMGT3	91	(Germany) Manthey EMA	(Austria) Richard Lietz (Netherlands) Morris Schuring (Australia) Yasser Shahin	Porsche 911 GT3 R (992)	G	171	+34 Laps
33	LMGT3	91	(Germany) Manthey EMA	(Austria) Richard Lietz (Netherlands) Morris Schuring (Australia) Yasser Shahin	Porsche M97/80 4.2 L Flat-6	G	171	+34 Laps
NC	Hypercar	99	(Germany) Proton Competition	(France) Julien Andlauer (Switzerland) Neel Jani (United Kingdom) Harry Tincknell	Porsche 963	MI	167	Not classified
NC	Hypercar	99	(Germany) Proton Competition	(France) Julien Andlauer (Switzerland) Neel Jani (United Kingdom) Harry Tincknell	Porsche 9RD 4.6 L Turbo V8	MI	167	Not classified
NC	LMGT3	85	(Italy) Iron Dames	(Belgium) Sarah Bovy (Denmark) Michelle Gatting (France) Doriane Pin	Lamborghini Huracán GT3 Evo 2	G	33	Not classified
NC	LMGT3	85	(Italy) Iron Dames	(Belgium) Sarah Bovy (Denmark) Michelle Gatting (France) Doriane Pin	Lamborghini DGF 5.2 L V10	G	33	Not classified
Ret	LMGT3	88	(Germany) Proton Competition	(Norway) Dennis Olsen (Denmark) Mikkel O. Pedersen (Italy) Giorgio Roda	Ford Mustang GT3	G	82	Retired
Ret	LMGT3	88	(Germany) Proton Competition	(Norway) Dennis Olsen (Denmark) Mikkel O. Pedersen (Italy) Giorgio Roda	Ford Coyote 5.4 L V8	G	82	Retired
DSQ	Hypercar	15	(Belgium) BMW M Team WRT	(Switzerland) Raffaele Marciello (Belgium) Dries Vanthoor (Germany) Marco Wittmann	BMW M Hybrid V8	MI	163	Parc fermé breach (Note: The No. 15 BMW M Team WRT entry was disqualified as it did not rejoin parc fermé under its own power.)
DSQ	Hypercar	15	(Belgium) BMW M Team WRT	(Switzerland) Raffaele Marciello (Belgium) Dries Vanthoor (Germany) Marco Wittmann	BMW P66/3 4.0 L Turbo V8	MI	163	Parc fermé breach

Tyre manufacturers
Key
Symbol	Tyre manufacturer
**G**	Goodyear
**MI**	Michelin

== Official recordings ==
- Free Practice 3 | 2024 6 Hours of Imola on YouTube
- Full Qualifying and Hyperpole | 2024 6 Hours of Imola on YouTube
- Full Race | 2024 6 Hours of Imola on YouTube
