= 2026 FIA GT World Cup =

Sports car race

Race details
Date	22 November 2026
Official name	Macau GT Cup – FIA GT World Cup
Location	Guia Circuit, Macau
Course	Temporary street circuit 6.120 km (3.803 mi)
Distance	Qualification Race; 12 laps, 73.440 km (45.634 mi); Main Race; 16 laps, 97.920 km (60.845 mi)
- Qualification Race

Pole
- Driver
- Time

Fastest lap
- Driver
- Time

Podium
- First
- Second
- Third
- Main Race

Fastest lap
- Driver
- Time

Podium
- First
- Second
- Third

The 2026 FIA GT World Cup (formally the Macau GT Cup – FIA GT World Cup) is planned to be a Grand Touring (GT) sports car race held on the Guia Circuit in Macau on 22 November 2026. It will be the ninth FIA GT World Cup and the sixteenth GT3 car race to be held in Macau. The race is co-organised by the SRO Motorsports Group and sanctioned by the Fédération Internationale de l'Automobile (FIA). The edition includes two races, with a 12-lap qualifying race setting the 16-lap main race's starting order.

== Background and entry list ==
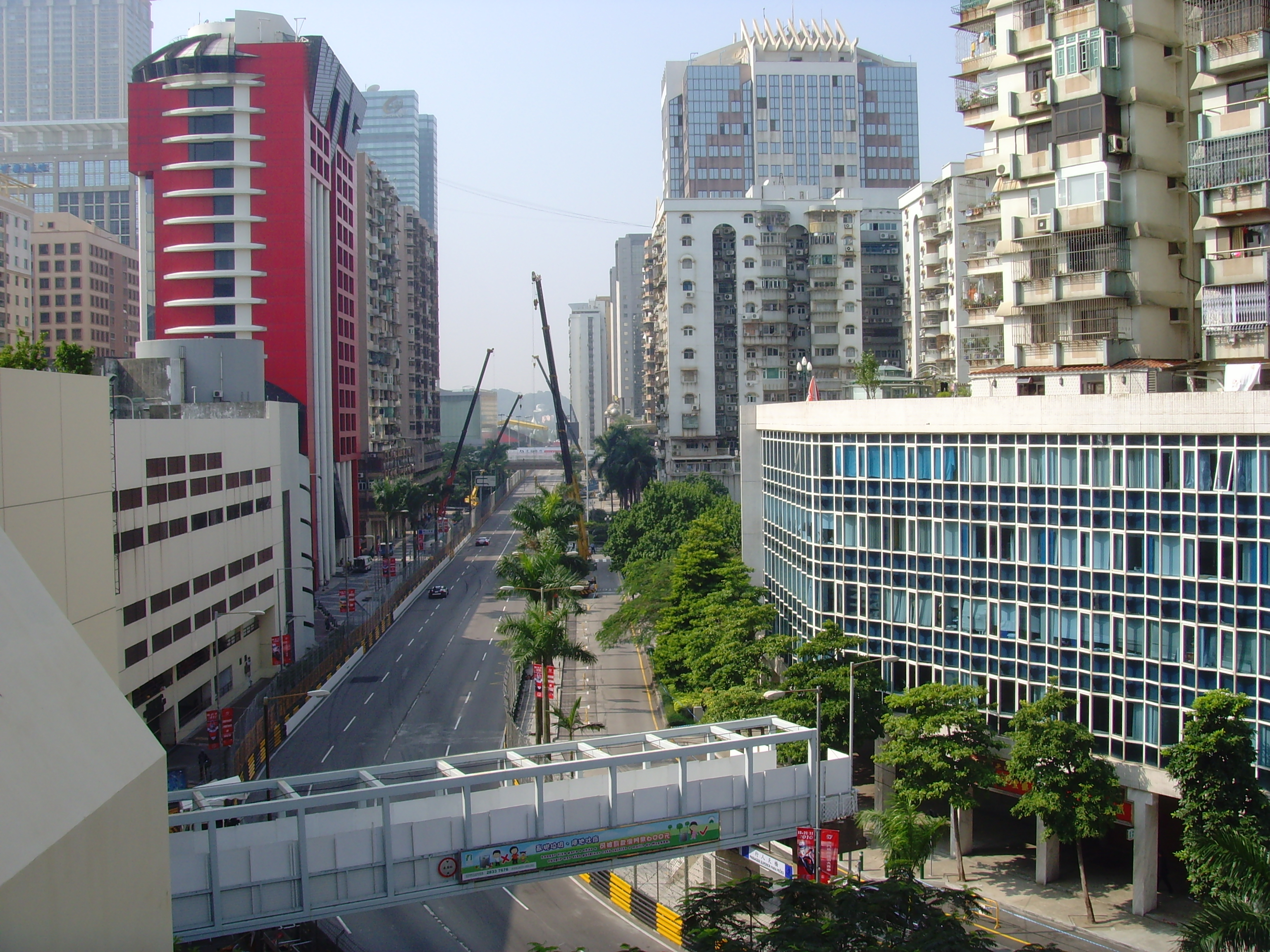
The Guia Circuit, where the race was held.

The 2026 edition of the race placed an emphasis on Silver rated drivers entering the race, due to the "growing strength and visibility of Silver-rated competitors in GT racing". The Silver cup offers a US$22,000 prize fund for the highest rated Silver driver across the weekend, along with a dedicated podium ceremony. Despite these measures, only two Silver drivers, Jamie Day, and Adderly Fong, ultimately entered the race.

The final entry list was revealed on October 16, 2026, with 18 entries, up two from 2025. Of these, 10 were Platinum rated drivers, six were Gold, and two were Silver. These 18 drivers represented 13 different nationalities. Three previous winners entered the race; Maro Engel, Augusto Farfus, and Raffaele Marciello.

A record eight manufactures entered the race, Aston Martin entering the race for the first time since 2015 with a pair of Comtoyou Racing cars, and Mercedes returning after missing 2025 due to the introduction of a torque sensor mandate for the race. They joined Audi, BMW, Ferrari, Lamborghini, McLaren and Porsche.

=== Entry list ===
Manufacturer	Car	Team	No.	Driver	Class
Aston Martin	Aston Martin Vantage AMR GT3 Evo	(Belgium) Comtoyou Racing	007	(Denmark) Marco Sørensen	P
Aston Martin	Aston Martin Vantage AMR GT3 Evo	(Belgium) Comtoyou Racing	24	(United Arab Emirates) Jamie Day	S
Audi	Audi R8 LMS Evo II	(Hong Kong) Audi Sport Asia Team Absolute	15	(New Zealand) Earl Bamber	P
Audi	Audi R8 LMS Evo II	(China) Audi Sport Asia Team Phantom	66	(Sweden) Joel Eriksson	P
BMW	BMW M4 GT3 Evo	(Belgium) Team WRT	31	(South Africa) Kelvin van der Linde	P
BMW	BMW M4 GT3 Evo	(Belgium) Team WRT	32	(Switzerland) Raffaele Marciello	P
BMW	BMW M4 GT3 Evo	(China) Team KRC	89	(Brazil) Augusto Farfus	P
Ferrari	Ferrari 296 GT3 Evo	(Malaysia) 33R HAR Racing	83	(Italy) Alessio Rovera	P
Ferrari	Ferrari 296 GT3 Evo	(China) Winhere Harmony Racing	96	(China) Yifei Ye	G
Lamborghini	Lamborghini Huracán GT3 Evo 2	(Hong Kong) Absolute Corse	63	(Germany) Luca Engstler	G
McLaren	McLaren 720S GT3 Evo	(United Kingdom) Optimum Motorsport	5	(Denmark) Benjamin Goethe	G
Mercedes-AMG	Mercedes-AMG GT3 Evo	(Hong Kong) Craft-Bamboo Racing	76	(Hong Kong) Adderly Fong	S
Mercedes-AMG	Mercedes-AMG GT3 Evo	(Hong Kong) Craft-Bamboo Racing	77	(Germany) Maro Engel	P
Mercedes-AMG	Mercedes-AMG GT3 Evo	(Australia) Tigani Motorsport	711	(Austria) Lucas Auer	P
Porsche	Porsche 911 GT3 R (992.2)	(United States) AO by Absolute Racing	8	(Germany) Laurin Heinrich	G
Porsche	Porsche 911 GT3 R (992.2)	(Hong Kong) Absolute Racing	618	(France) Dorian Boccolacci	G
Porsche	Porsche 911 GT3 R (992.2)	(Hong Kong) Tempo by Absolute Racing	911	(Belgium) Alessio Picariello	G
Porsche	Porsche 911 GT3 R (992.2)	(Hong Kong) Tempo by Absolute Racing	992	(Austria) Thomas Preining	P

Icon	Class
P	Platinum Cup
G	Gold Cup
S	Silver Cup

== Practice and qualifying ==
Two 30-minute practice sessions are scheduled to be held on 19 November, and two qualifying sessions of 30-minute and 25-minute length are scheduled to be held on 20 November. The first of these sessions will see the quickest 10 drivers advance to session two, known as "Super Pole". The ten "Super Pole" qualifiers will each get two qualifying laps with the circuit to themselves, as well as a new set of tyres. These two sessions will set the grid for the qualifying race.

=== Qualifying classification ===
Final qualifying classification
Pos.	Class	No.	Driver	Team	Manufacturer	Qualifying 1	Qualifying 2

Categorisation
Icon	Class
P	Platinum
G	Gold
S	Silver

== Qualification race ==
The 12-lap qualification race to set the main race's starting order is scheduled for 21 November.

=== Qualification race classification ===
Final qualification race classification
Pos.	Class	No.	Driver	Team	Car	Laps	Time/Retired

== Main race ==
The 16-lap main race is scheduled for 22 November.

=== Main race classification ===
Final main race classification
Pos.	Class	No.	Driver	Team	Car	Laps	Time/Retired

== See also ==
- 2026 Macau Grand Prix
- 2026 Macau Guia Race
