= Antonio Fuoco =

Italian racing driver

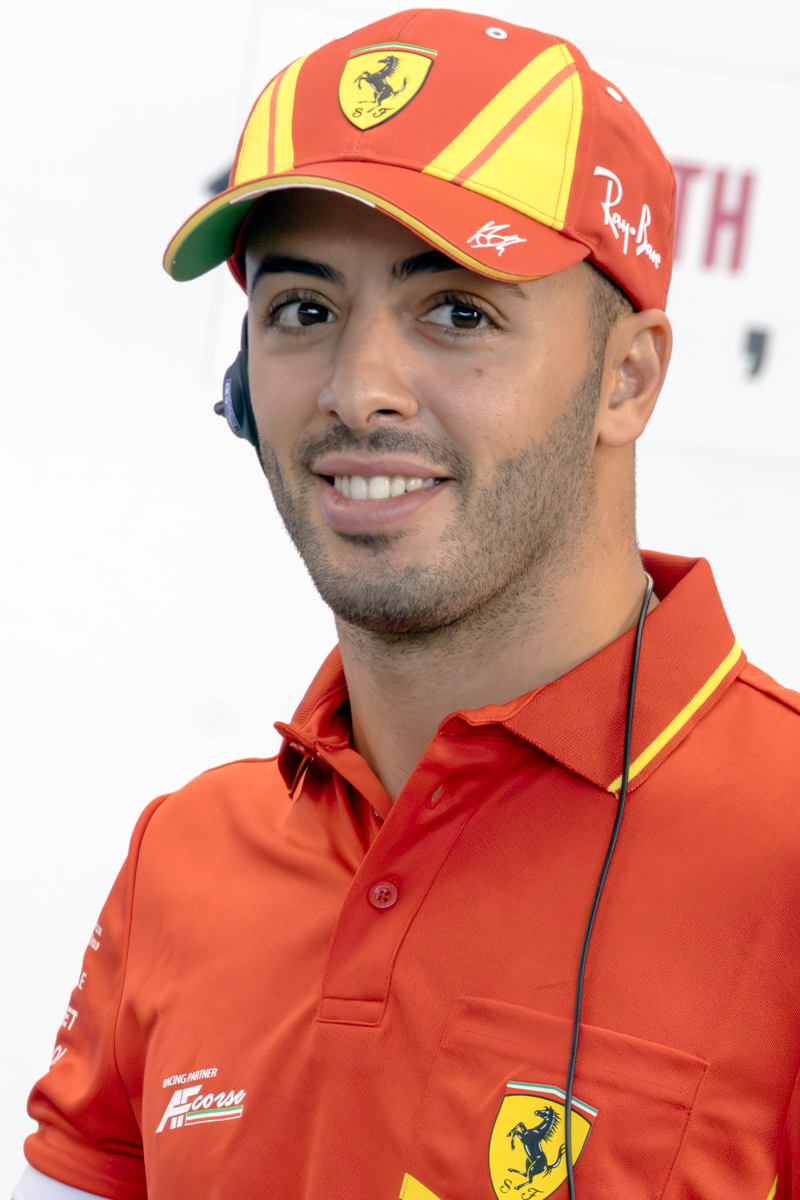
- Fuoco at the 2024 6 Hours of Fuji
- Nationality: (Italy) Italian
- Born: 20 May 1996 (age 30) Cariati, Cosenza, Italy

FIA World Endurance Championship career
- Debut season: 2021
- Current team: Ferrari AF Corse
- Categorisation: FIA Gold (until 2021); FIA Platinum (2022–)
- Car number: 50
- Former teams: Cetilar Racing
- Starts: 43
- Wins: 5
- Podiums: 21
- Poles: 6
- Fastest laps: 5
- Best finish: 2nd in 2024

Previous series
- 2019–20 2017–18 2015–16 2014 2013 2013: Asian Le Mans Series - GT; FIA Formula 2 Championship; GP3 Series; FIA Formula 3 European Championship; Formula Renault 2.0 Alps; Eurocup Formula Renault 2.0

Championship titles
- 2013 2025: Formula Renault 2.0 Alps; FIA GT World Cup

Antonio Fuoco (born 20 May 1996) is an Italian racing driver who is currently competing in the FIA World Endurance Championship for Ferrari AF Corse in the Ferrari 499P. He also serves as a development driver for the Scuderia Ferrari Formula One team and is a factory driver for the Competizione GT. He is a former member of the Ferrari Driver Academy. Fuoco won the 2024 24 Hours of Le Mans alongside Miguel Molina and Nicklas Nielsen.

== Career ==
=== Karting ===
Born in Cariati, Fuoco debuted in karting at the age of four and raced in various European championships, working his way up from the junior ranks to progress through to the KF2 category by 2012, when he finished third in WSK Euro Series and fourth in the CIK-FIA European KF2 Championship.

=== Formula Renault ===
In 2013, Fuoco graduated to single-seaters, racing in the newly launched Formula Renault 2.0 Alps series for Prema Junior. He won races at Vallelunga, Imola, Monza and Mugello and amassed another three podiums. He also competed in a round of the Eurocup Formula Renault 2.0 championship with the team, at Spa-Francorchamps.

=== Formula Three ===
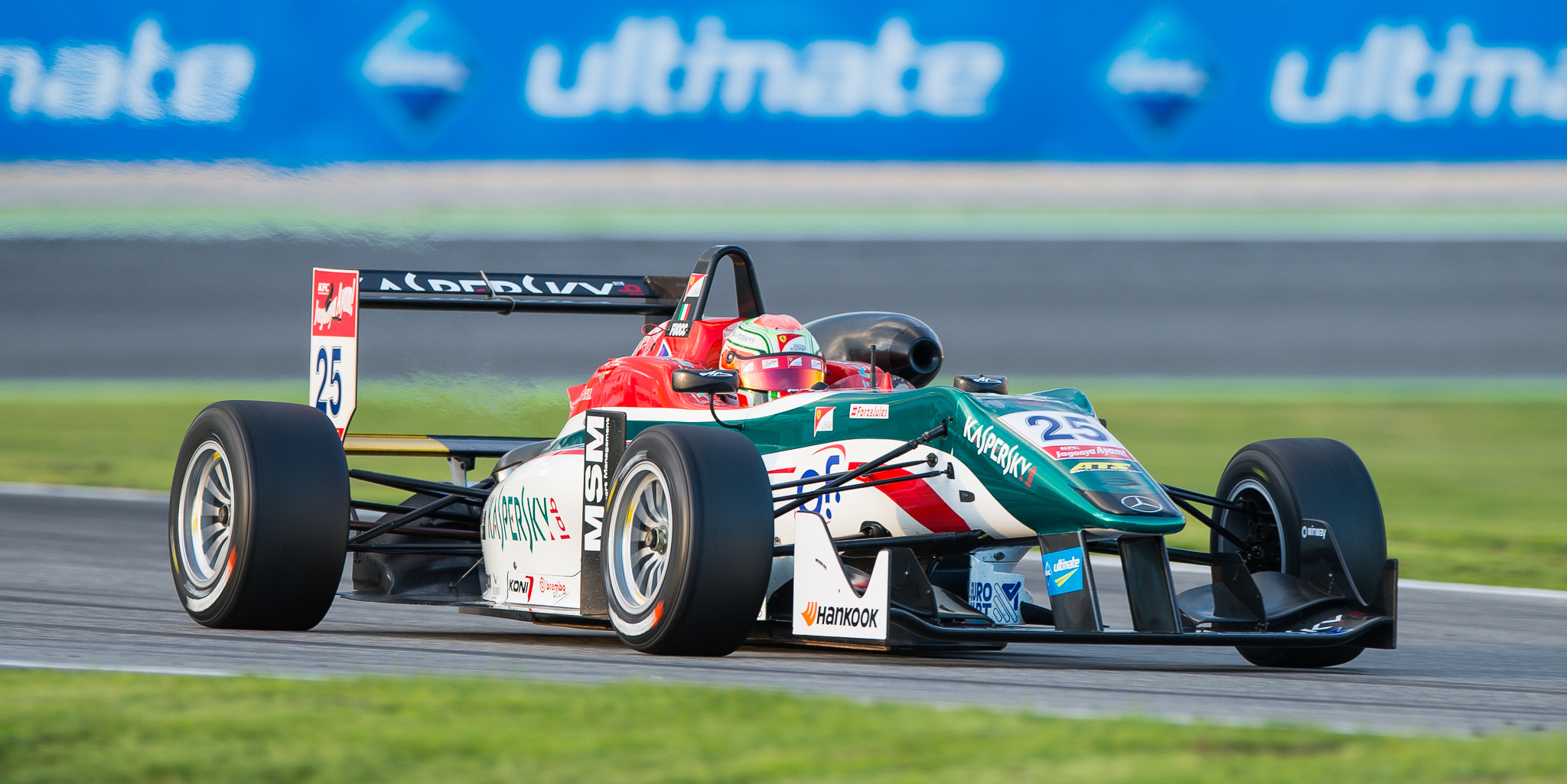
Antonio Fuoco in F3 - Hockenheimring 2014

Fuoco stepped up to FIA European Formula Three Championship in 2014, continuing with Prema Powerteam. He finished fifth in the driver standings, with two wins at Silverstone and Spielberg, and ten podiums out of 33 races.

=== GP3 Series ===
On 23 January 2015, it was announced Fuoco would be racing in the GP3 Series with Carlin Motorsport. Despite scoring two podiums, Fuoco experienced an inconsistent season, including crashes at the Red Bull Ring, the Hungaroring, Spa and Monza.

In February 2016, following Carlin's departure from the series, it was announced Fuoco would be racing for Trident, where he collected his maiden victories and finished third in the championship.

=== FIA Formula 2 Championship ===
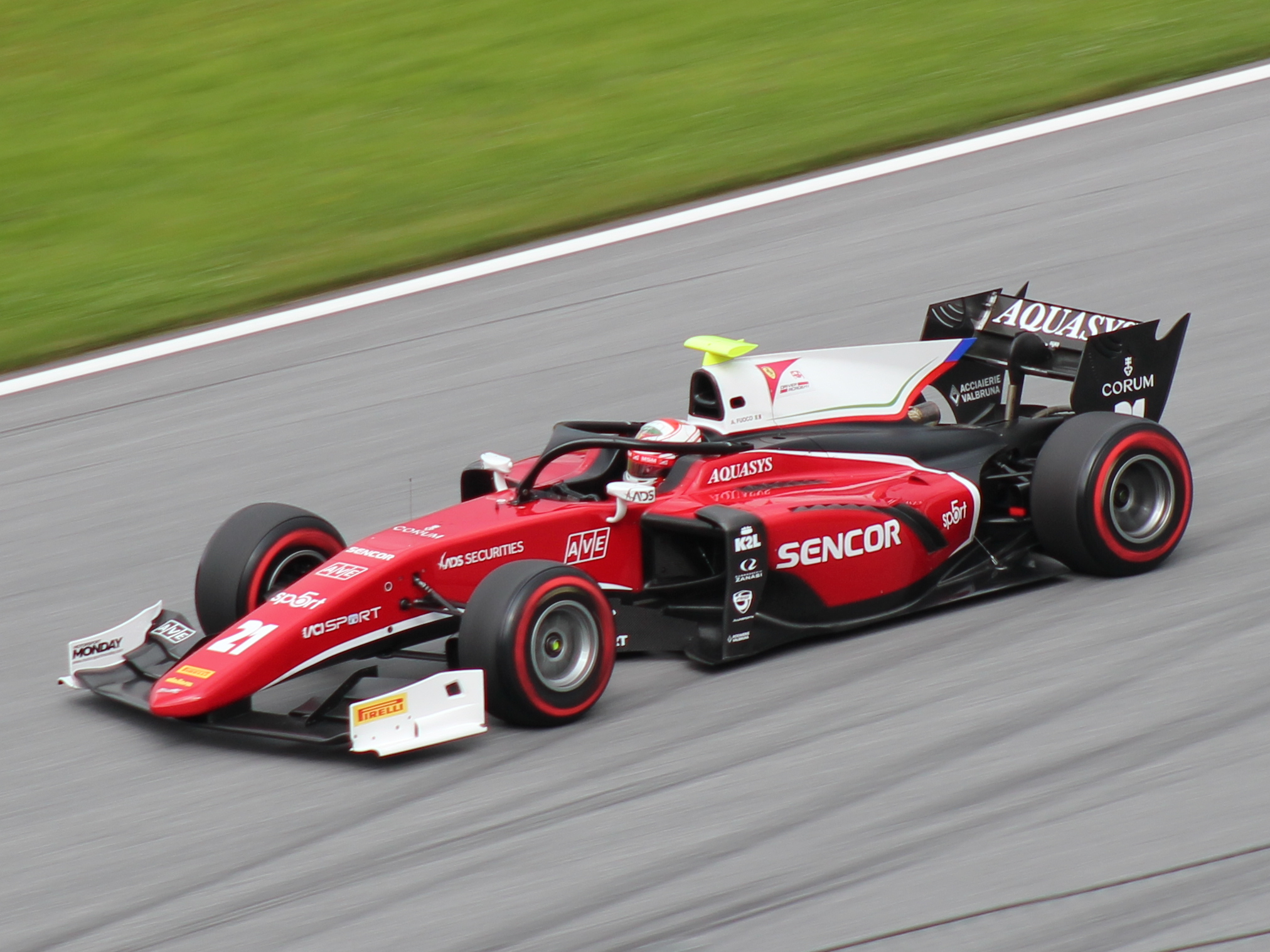
Antonio Fuoco in F2 - Red Bull Ring 2018

In November 2016, it was announced that Fuoco would graduate to the series, reunite with Prema and partner fellow Ferrari junior and GP3 champion Charles Leclerc for the 2017 season.

=== FIA Formula E ===
In October 2018, Fuoco partook in the pre-season test at Valencia with GEOX Dragon and the following month, was named the team's reserve and test driver for the 2018-19 season. In January 2019, Dragon ran Fuoco in the rookie test at Marrakesh where he set the third best time in the overall classification.

=== Formula One ===
On 23 June 2015, Fuoco had his first Formula One test with Ferrari during the two-day post-Austrian Grand Prix test in Spielberg at the Red Bull Ring.

On 19 January 2019, when Mick Schumacher was confirmed as a Ferrari Driver Academy driver, it was also confirmed that Fuoco was no longer part of the academy, but was instead promoted to Ferrari’s F1 simulator team.

Fuoco took part in the 2020 Young Driver Test for Ferrari alongside Robert Shwartzman. In December 2021 and 2024, Fuoco took part in the post-season test at Yas Marina Circuit for Scuderia Ferrari. He made his Friday free practice session (FP1) debut with the team during the 2025 Mexico City Grand Prix.

== Hypercar career ==
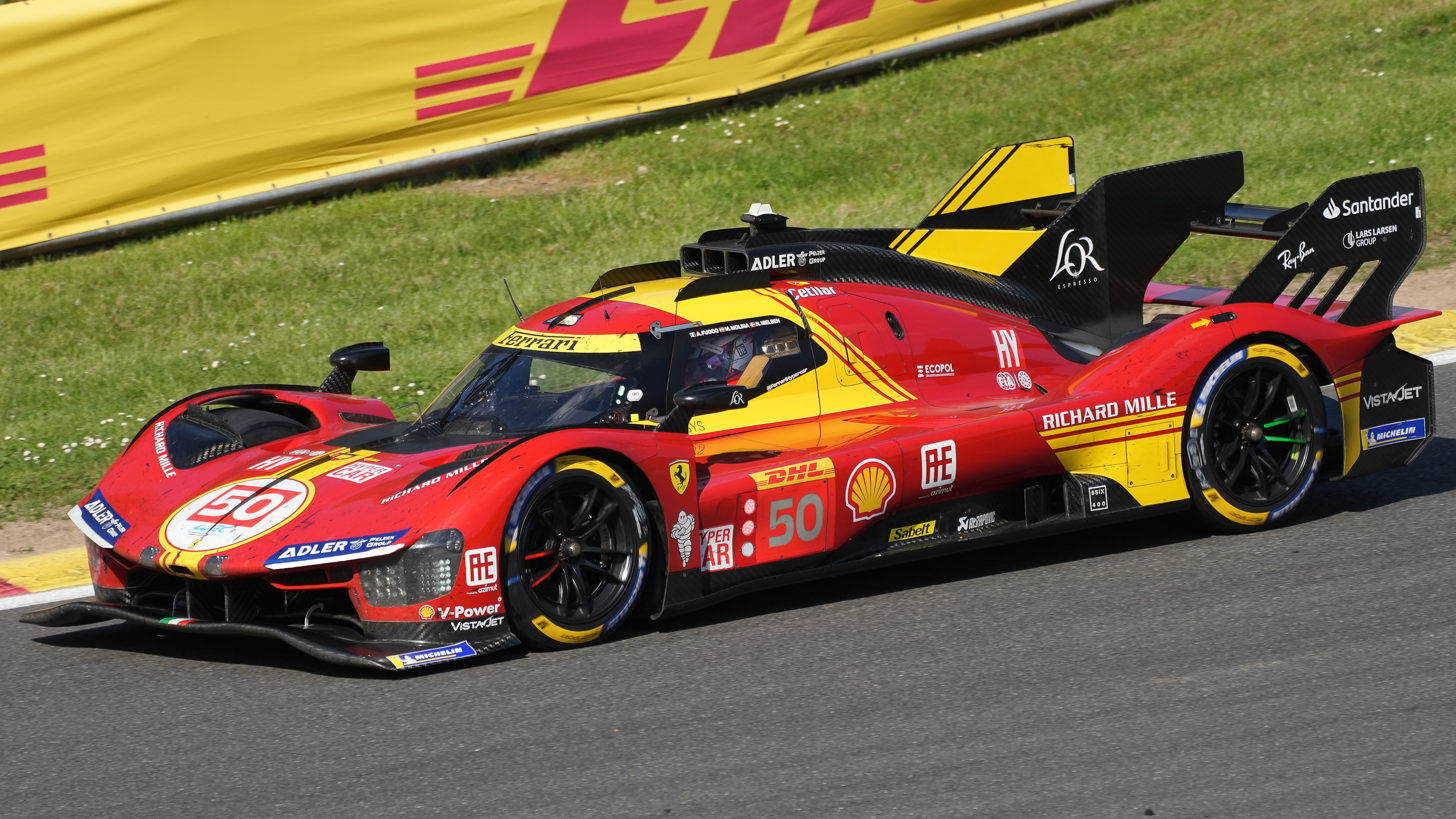
Fuoco driving the No. 50 499P at the 2024 6 Hours of Spa-Francorchamps

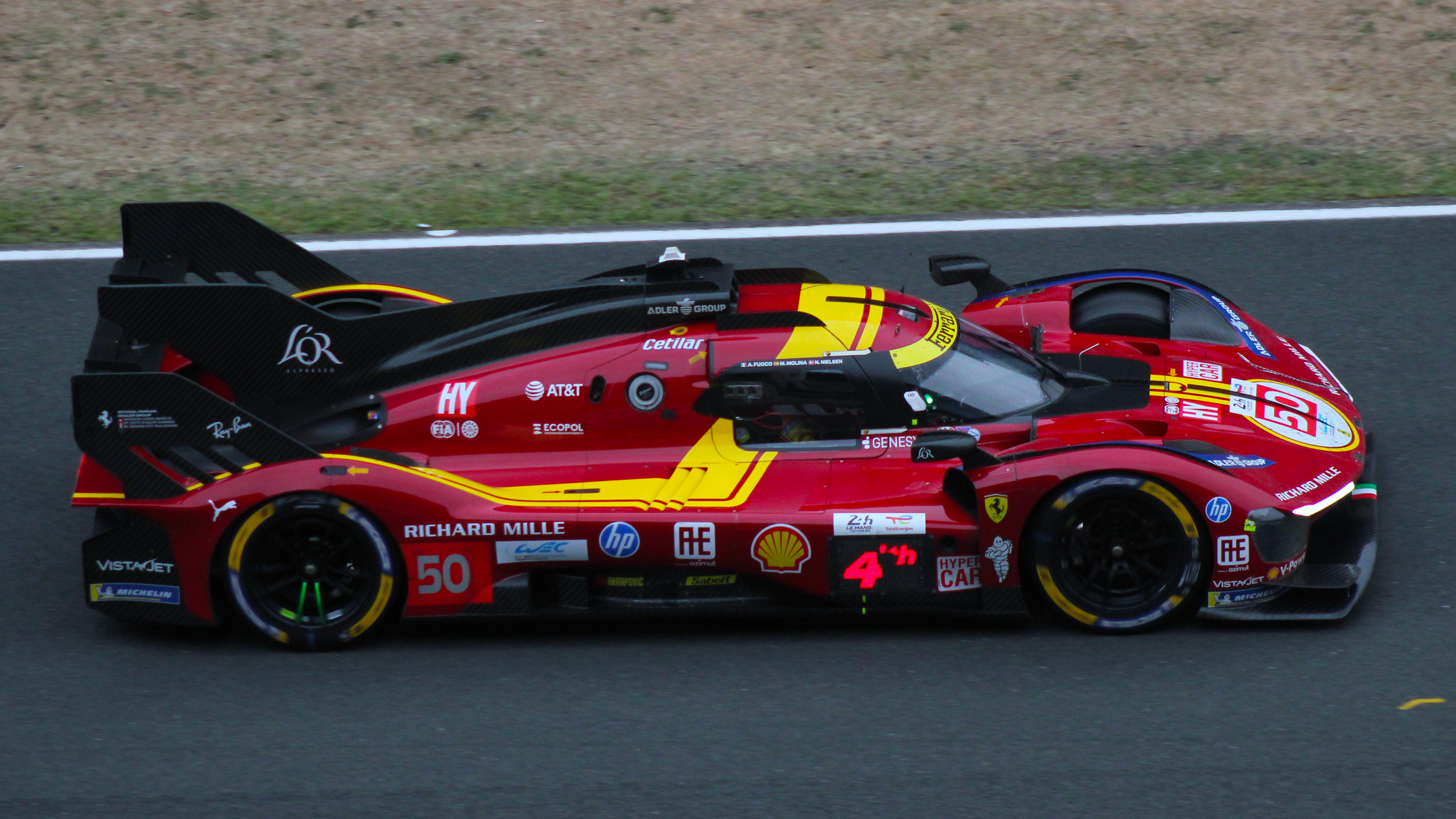
Fuoco's No. 50 car at the 2025 24 Hours of Le Mans

For the 2023 season, Fuoco joined the Ferrari AF Corse outfit in the Le Mans Hypercar category of the World Endurance Championship, partnering Miguel Molina and Nicklas Nielsen in a Ferrari 499P. The opening round at the 1000 Miles of Sebring began with a positive surprise, as Fuoco took the brand's first pole in the top class of the Championship. In 2024, Fuoco, along with Nielsen and Molina of the No. 50 Ferrari AF Corse team, won the 24 Hours of Le Mans in the Hypercar category.

== Racing record ==
=== Career summary ===
Season	Series	Team	Races	Wins	Poles	F/Laps	Podiums	Points	Position
2013	Formula Renault 2.0 Alps	Prema Junior	14	6	5	5	11	245	**1st**
2013	Eurocup Formula Renault 2.0	Prema Powerteam	2	0	1	0	0	N/A	NC†
2014	FIA Formula 3 European Championship	Prema Powerteam	32	2	0	2	10	255	5th
2014	Florida Winter Series	N/A	12	4	3	3	7	N/A	N/A
2015	GP3 Series	Carlin	18	0	0	0	2	88	6th
2015	Formula One	Scuderia Ferrari	Development driver						
2016	GP3 Series	Trident	18	2	0	0	8	157	**3rd**
2016	Formula One	Scuderia Ferrari	Development driver						
2017	FIA Formula 2 Championship	Prema Racing	22	1	0	1	5	98	8th
2018	FIA Formula 2 Championship	Charouz Racing System	23	2	0	1	6	141	7th
2018–19	Formula E	GEOX Dragon	Test/Reserve driver						
2019	Italian GT Sprint Championship	AF Corse	8	0	?	?	3	62	4th
2019	Formula One	Scuderia Ferrari	Test driver						
2019–20	Asian Le Mans Series - GT	Car Guy Racing	1	0	0	0	0	10	16th
2020	GT World Challenge Europe Endurance Cup	SMP Racing	1	0	1	0	0	7	20th
2020	Formula One	Scuderia Ferrari	Development driver						
2021	FIA World Endurance Championship - LMGTE Am	Cetilar Racing	6	1	1	1	2	75	5th
2021	IMSA SportsCar Championship - LMP2	Cetilar Racing	1	0	0	0	0	0	NC‡
2021	24 Hours of Le Mans - LMGTE Am	Cetilar Racing	1	0	0	0	0	N/A	DNF
2021	GT World Challenge Europe Endurance Cup	Iron Lynx	5	0	0	1	0	27	11th
2021	Intercontinental GT Challenge	Iron Lynx Motorsport Lab	1	0	0	0	0	0	NC
2021	Intercontinental GT Challenge	AF Corse - Francorchamps Motors	2	0	0	0	0	0	NC
2021	Formula One	Scuderia Ferrari	Development driver						
2022	FIA World Endurance Championship - LMGTE Pro	AF Corse	6	1	0	1	5	131	**3rd**
2022	24 Hours of Le Mans - LMGTE Pro	AF Corse	1	0	0	0	1	N/A	**3rd**
2022	IMSA SportsCar Championship - GTD	Cetilar Racing	3	1	0	2	1	870	28th
2022	GT World Challenge Europe Endurance Cup	Iron Lynx	5	1	2	0	3	87	**2nd**
2022	Intercontinental GT Challenge	Iron Lynx	1	0	0	0	1	58	**3rd**
2022	Intercontinental GT Challenge	AF Corse - Francorchamps	2	1	0	0	2	58	**3rd**
2022	Formula One	Scuderia Ferrari	Development driver						
2023	FIA World Endurance Championship - Hypercar	Ferrari AF Corse	7	0	2	1	4	120	**3rd**
2023	24 Hours of Le Mans - Hypercar	Ferrari AF Corse	1	0	1	1	0	N/A	5th
2023	GT World Challenge Europe Endurance Cup	AF Corse	5	0	0	0	1	33	10th
2023	IMSA SportsCar Championship - GTD	Cetilar Racing	4	0	0	0	0	637	38th
2023	Formula One	Scuderia Ferrari	Development driver						
2024	FIA World Endurance Championship - Hypercar	Ferrari AF Corse	8	1	1	1	3	115	**2nd**
2024	24 Hours of Le Mans - Hypercar	Ferrari AF Corse	1	1	0	0	1	50	**1st**
2024	IMSA SportsCar Championship - GTD	Cetilar Racing	5	0	1	0	1	1183	29th
2024	FIA GT World Cup	AF Corse	1	0	0	0	0	N/A	9th
2024	Formula One	Scuderia Ferrari	Development driver						
2025	FIA World Endurance Championship - Hypercar	Ferrari AF Corse	8	1	1	1	4	98	**3rd**
2025	IMSA SportsCar Championship - GTD	Cetilar Racing	4	0	0	0	0	748	36th
2025	GT World Challenge Europe Endurance Cup	AF Corse - Francorchamps Motors	4	0	0	0	0	34	9th
2025	FIA GT World Cup	AF Corse SRL	1	1	1	1	1	N/A	**1st**
2025	Formula One	Scuderia Ferrari HP	Development driver						
2025–26	Asian Le Mans Series - LMP2	Cetilar Racing	6	2	0	1	3	81	**2nd**
2026	FIA World Endurance Championship - Hypercar	Ferrari AF Corse	8	1	1	0	3	72	9th
2026	European Le Mans Series - LMP2 Pro-Am	AF Corse	6	1	0	0	2	67	**3rd**
2026	IMSA SportsCar Championship - GTD	AF Corse USA	5	1	1	2	1	1318	22nd
2026	Formula One	Scuderia Ferrari HP	Development driver						
2026–27	Asian Le Mans Series - Hypercar	Cetilar Racing	2	0	1	0	2	37*	**2nd***

^{†} As Fuoco was a guest driver, he was ineligible to score points.
^{‡} Points only counted towards the Michelin Endurance Cup, and not the overall LMP2 Championship. ^{*} Season still in progress.

=== Complete Eurocup Formula Renault 2.0 results ===
(key) (Races in bold indicate pole position; races in italics indicate fastest lap)

Year	Entrant	1	2	3	4	5	6	7	8	9	10	11	12	13	14	DC	Points
2013	Prema Powerteam	ALC; 1	ALC; 2	SPA; 1; 5	**SPA**; **2**; 4	MSC; 1	MSC; 2	RBR; 1	RBR; 2	HUN; 1	HUN; 2	LEC; 1	LEC; 2	CAT; 1	CAT; 2	NC†	0

† As Fuoco was a guest driver, he was ineligible for points

=== Complete Formula Renault 2.0 Alps Series results ===
(key) (Races in bold indicate pole position) (Races in italics indicate fastest lap)

Year	Team	1	2	3	4	5	6	7	8	9	10	11	12	13	14	Pos	Points
2013	Prema Junior	VLL; 1; 2	VLL; 2; 1	**IMO1**; **1**; 1	**IMO1**; **2**; 1	SPA; 1; 14	SPA; 2; 3	**MNZ**; **1**; 1	MNZ; 2; 6	MIS; 1; 2	MIS; 2 Ret	**MUG**; **1**; 1	**MUG**; **2**; 1	IMO2; 1; 2	IMO2; 2; 2	1st	245

=== Complete FIA Formula 3 European Championship results ===
(key) (Races in bold indicate pole position) (Races in italics indicate fastest lap)

Year	Entrant	Engine	1	2	3	4	5	6	7	8	9	10	11	12	13	14	15	16	17	18	19	20	21	22	23	24	25	26	27	28	29	30	31	32	33	DC	Points
2014	Prema Powerteam	Mercedes	SIL; 1; 4	SIL; 2; 3	SIL; 3; 1	HOC; 1; 11	HOC; 2 Ret	HOC; 3; 3	PAU; 1; 17	PAU; 2; 19†	PAU; 3; 11	HUN; 1; 19	HUN; 2; 2	HUN; 3; 2	SPA; 1; 5	SPA; 2 Ret	SPA; 3; 16	NOR; 1 Ret	NOR; 2; 7	NOR; 3; 9	MSC; 1; 6	MSC; 2; 2	MSC; 3; 3	RBR; 1; 6	RBR; 2; 1	RBR; 3; 19	NÜR; 1; 2	NÜR; 2; 4	NÜR; 3; 4	IMO; 1; 16	IMO; 2; 25	IMO; 3; 2	HOC; 1; 14	HOC; 2 DSQ	HOC; 3 DNS	5th	255

^{†} Driver did not finish the race, but was classified as he completed over 90% of the race distance.

=== Complete GP3 Series results ===
(key) (Races in bold indicate pole position) (Races in italics indicate fastest lap)

Year	Entrant	1	2	3	4	5	6	7	8	9	10	11	12	13	14	15	16	17	18	Pos	Points
2015	Carlin	CAT; FEA; 8	CAT; SPR; 4	RBR; FEA; 2	RBR; SPR; Ret	SIL; FEA; 18	SIL; SPR; 23	HUN; FEA; 8	HUN; SPR; Ret	SPA; FEA; 4	SPA; SPR; Ret	MNZ; FEA; Ret	MNZ; SPR; 11	SOC; FEA; 6	SOC; SPR; 4	BHR; FEA; 9	BHR; SPR; 5	YMC; FEA; 7	YMC; SPR; 2	6th	88
2016	Trident	CAT; FEA; 4	CAT; SPR; 3	RBR; FEA; 5	RBR; SPR; 3	SIL; FEA; 3	SIL; SPR; 1	HUN; FEA; 2	HUN; SPR; 10	HOC; FEA; 1	HOC; SPR; 18†	SPA; FEA; 4	SPA; SPR; 2	MNZ; FEA; 8	MNZ; SPR; 3	SEP; FEA; 8	SEP; SPR; Ret	YMC; FEA; 16	YMC; SPR; 17	3rd	157

^{†} Driver did not finish the race, but was classified as he completed over 90% of the race distance.

=== Complete FIA Formula 2 Championship results ===
(key) (Races in bold indicate pole position) (Races in italics indicate points for the fastest lap of top ten finishers)

Year	Entrant	1	2	3	4	5	6	7	8	9	10	11	12	13	14	15	16	17	18	19	20	21	22	23	24	DC	Points
2017	Prema Racing	BHR; FEA; 9	BHR; SPR; 11	CAT; FEA; 13	CAT; SPR; Ret	MON; FEA; 11	MON; SPR; 10	BAK; FEA; Ret	BAK; SPR; 12	RBR; FEA; 3	RBR; SPR; 5	SIL; FEA; 16	SIL; SPR; 12	HUN; FEA; Ret	HUN; SPR; 17	SPA; FEA; 3	SPA; SPR; 7	MNZ; FEA; 1	MNZ; SPR; 3	JER; FEA; 3	JER; SPR; 5	YMC; FEA; DSQ	YMC; SPR; 11			8th	98
2018	Charouz Racing System	BHR; FEA; 17	BHR; SPR; 12	BAK; FEA; 3	BAK; SPR; DNS	CAT; FEA; 10	CAT; SPR; 7	MON; FEA; 8	MON; SPR; 1	LEC; FEA; 4	LEC; SPR; 4	RBR; FEA; 3	RBR; SPR; 4	SIL; FEA; 3	SIL; SPR; Ret	HUN; FEA; 3	HUN; SPR; 17	SPA; FEA; 17	SPA; SPR; 19	MNZ; FEA; DSQ	MNZ; SPR; 10	SOC; FEA; 6	SOC; SPR; 9	YMC; FEA; 7	YMC; SPR; 1	7th	141

=== Complete Asian Le Mans Series results ===
(Races in bold indicate pole position) (Races in italics indicate fastest lap)

Year	Team	Car	Engine	Class	1	2	3	4	5	6	Pos.	Points
2019–20	CarGuy Racing	GT	Ferrari 488 GT3	Ferrari F154CB 3.9 L Turbo V8	SEP; 5	BEN	SEP	CHA			16th	10
2025–26	Cetilar Racing	LMP2	Oreca 07	Gibson GK428 4.2 L V8	SEP; 1; 1	SEP; 2; 1	DUB; 1; 2	DUB; 2; 4	ABU; 1; 11	ABU; 2; 10	2nd	81
2026–27	Cetilar Racing	Hypercar	Ferrari 499P	Ferrari F163CG 3.0 L Turbo V6	**LEC**; **1**; 2	LEC; 2; 2	JER; 1	JER; 2	ALG; 1	ALG; 2	2nd*	37*

=== Complete GT World Challenge results ===
==== GT World Challenge Europe Endurance Cup ====
(Races in bold indicate pole position) (Races in italics indicate fastest lap)

Year	Team	Car	Class	1	2	3	4	5	6	7	Pos.	Points
2020	SMP Racing	Ferrari 488 GT3	Pro	IMO	NÜR	SPA; 6H	SPA; 12H	SPA; 24H	**LEC**; 7		20th	7
2021	Iron Lynx	Ferrari 488 GT3 Evo 2020	Pro	MNZ; 4	LEC; 4	SPA; 6H; Ret	SPA; 12H; Ret	SPA; 24H; Ret	NÜR; 38	CAT; 39	11th	27
2022	Iron Lynx	Ferrari 488 GT3 Evo 2020	Pro	IMO; 8	**LEC**; 1	SPA; 6H; 2	SPA; 12H; 4	SPA; 24H; 3	HOC; Ret	**CAT**; 2	2nd	87
2023	AF Corse - Francorchamps Motors	Ferrari 296 GT3	Pro	MNZ; 14	LEC; 5	SPA; 6H; 7	SPA; 12H; 17	SPA; 24H; 11	NÜR; 14	CAT; 2	10th	33
2025	AF Corse - Francorchamps Motors	Ferrari 296 GT3	Pro	LEC; 16	MNZ; 43†	SPA; 6H; 5	SPA; 12H; 5	SPA; 24H; 4	NÜR; DNS	CAT; 4	9th	34

=== Complete IMSA SportsCar Championship results ===
(key) (Races in bold indicate pole position; races in italics indicate fastest lap)

Year	Entrant	Class	Make	Engine	1	2	3	4	5	6	7	8	9	10	11	12	Rank	Points
2021	Cetilar Racing	LMP2	Dallara P217	Gibson GK428 4.2 L V8	DAY; 6†	SEB	WGL	WGL	ELK	LGA	PET						NC†	0†
2022	Cetilar Racing	GTD	Ferrari 488 GT3 Evo 2020	Ferrari F154CB 3.9 L Turbo V8	DAY; 14	SEB; 1	LBH	LGA	MDO	DET	WGL; 4	MOS	LIM	ELK	VIR	PET	28th	870
2023	Cetilar Racing	GTD	Ferrari 296 GT3	Ferrari F163CE 3.0 L Turbo V6	DAY; 23	SEB; 14	LBH	LGA	WGL; 18	MOS	LIM	ELK	VIR	IMS	PET; 13		38th	637
2024	Cetilar Racing	GTD	Ferrari 296 GT3	Ferrari F163CE 3.0 L Turbo V6	DAY; 10	**SEB**; 2	LBH	LGA	WGL; 18	MOS	ELK	VIR	IMS; 7	PET; 14			29th	1183
2025	Cetilar Racing	GTD	Ferrari 296 GT3	Ferrari F163CE 3.0 L Turbo V6	DAY; 20	SEB; 19	LBH	LGA	WGL; 7	MOS	ELK	VIR	IMS; 12	PET			36th	748
2026	AF Corse USA	GTD	Ferrari 296 GT3 Evo	Ferrari F163CE 3.0 L Turbo V6	DAY; 5	SEB; 1	LBH	LGA	WGL; 17	MOS	**ELK**; 11	VIR	IMS	PET; 6			22nd	1318

^{†} Points only counted towards the Michelin Endurance Cup, and not the overall LMP2 Championship.

=== Complete FIA World Endurance Championship results ===
(key) (Races in bold indicate pole position) (Races in italics indicate fastest lap)

Year	Entrant	Class	Car	Engine	1	2	3	4	5	6	7	8	Rank	Points
2021	Cetilar Racing	LMGTE Am	Ferrari 488 GTE Evo	Ferrari F154CB 3.9 L Turbo V8	SPA; 3	ALG; 1	MNZ; 10	LMS; Ret	BHR; 9	**BHR**; 4			5th	75
2022	AF Corse	LMGTE Pro	Ferrari 488 GTE Evo	Ferrari F154CB 3.9 L Turbo V8	SEB; 6	SPA; 3	LMS; 3	MNZ; 2	FUJ; 2	BHR; 1			3rd	131
2023	Ferrari AF Corse	Hypercar	Ferrari 499P	Ferrari F163CG 3.0 L Turbo V6	**SEB**; 3	ALG; 2	SPA; Ret	**LMS**; 5	MNZ; 2	FUJ; 4	BHR; 3		3rd	120
2024	Ferrari AF Corse	Hypercar	Ferrari 499P	Ferrari F163CG 3.0 L Turbo V6	QAT; 6	**IMO**; 4	SPA; 3	LMS; 1	SÃO; 6	COA; 3	FUJ; 9	BHR; 11	2nd	115
2025	Ferrari AF Corse	Hypercar	Ferrari 499P	Ferrari F163CG 3.0 L Turbo V6	QAT; 1	IMO; 15	**SPA**; 2	LMS; DSQ	SÃO; 12	COA; 2	FUJ; 11	BHR; 3	3rd	98
2026	Ferrari AF Corse	Hypercar	Ferrari 499P	Ferrari F163CG 3.0 L Turbo V6	IMO; 6	SPA; 3	LMS; Ret	SÃO; 7	COA; 1	FUJ; NC	CAT; 3	**MNZ**; 9	9th	72

=== Complete 24 Hours of Le Mans results ===
Year	Team	Co-Drivers	Car	Class	Laps	Pos.	Class Pos.
2021	(Italy) Cetilar Racing	(Italy) Roberto Lacorte (Italy) Giorgio Sernagiotto	Ferrari 488 GTE Evo	GTE; Am	90	DNF	DNF
2022	(Italy) AF Corse	(Spain) Miguel Molina (Italy) Davide Rigon	Ferrari 488 GTE Evo	GTE; Pro	349	30th	**3rd**
2023	(Italy) Ferrari AF Corse	(Spain) Miguel Molina (Denmark) Nicklas Nielsen	Ferrari 499P	Hypercar	337	5th	5th
2024	(Italy) Ferrari AF Corse	(Spain) Miguel Molina (Denmark) Nicklas Nielsen	Ferrari 499P	Hypercar	311	**1st**	**1st**
2025	(Italy) Ferrari AF Corse	(Spain) Miguel Molina (Denmark) Nicklas Nielsen	Ferrari 499P	Hypercar	387	DSQ	DSQ
2026	(Italy) Ferrari AF Corse	(Spain) Miguel Molina (Denmark) Nicklas Nielsen	Ferrari 499P	Hypercar	284	DNF	DNF

=== Complete Formula One participations ===
(key) (Races in bold indicate pole position) (Races in italics indicate fastest lap)

Year	Entrant	Chassis	Engine	1	2	3	4	5	6	7	8	9	10	11	12	13	14	15	16	17	18	19	20	21	22	23	24	WDC	Points
2025	Scuderia Ferrari HP	Ferrari SF-25	Ferrari 066/12 1.6 V6 t	AUS	CHN	JPN	BHR	SAU	MIA	EMI	MON	ESP	CAN	AUT	GBR	BEL	HUN	NED	ITA	AZE	SIN	USA	MXC; TD	SAP	LVG	QAT	ABU	–	–

=== Complete European Le Mans Series results ===
(key) (Races in bold indicate pole position; results in italics indicate fastest lap)

Year	Entrant	Class	Chassis	Engine	1	2	3	4	5	6	Rank	Points
2026	AF Corse	LMP2 Pro-Am	Oreca 07	Gibson GK428 4.2 L V8	CAT; 2	LEC; 6	IMO; 5	SPA; 1	SIL; 7	ALG; 11	3rd	67

Sporting positions
Preceded by Daniil Kvyat	Formula Renault 2.0 Alps; Champion; 2013	Succeeded by Nyck de Vries
Preceded by Patrick Kujala	Formula Renault 2.0 Alps; Junior Champion; 2013	Succeeded by Charles Leclerc
Preceded by James Calado; Antonio Giovinazzi; Alessandro Pier Guidi	Winner of the 24 Hours of Le Mans; 2024; With: Miguel Molina & Nicklas Nielsen	Succeeded by Phil Hanson; Robert Kubica; Yifei Ye
Preceded by Maro Engel	FIA GT World Cup; Winner; 2025	Succeeded by Kelvin van der Linde
