= Kürnach =

- Municipality
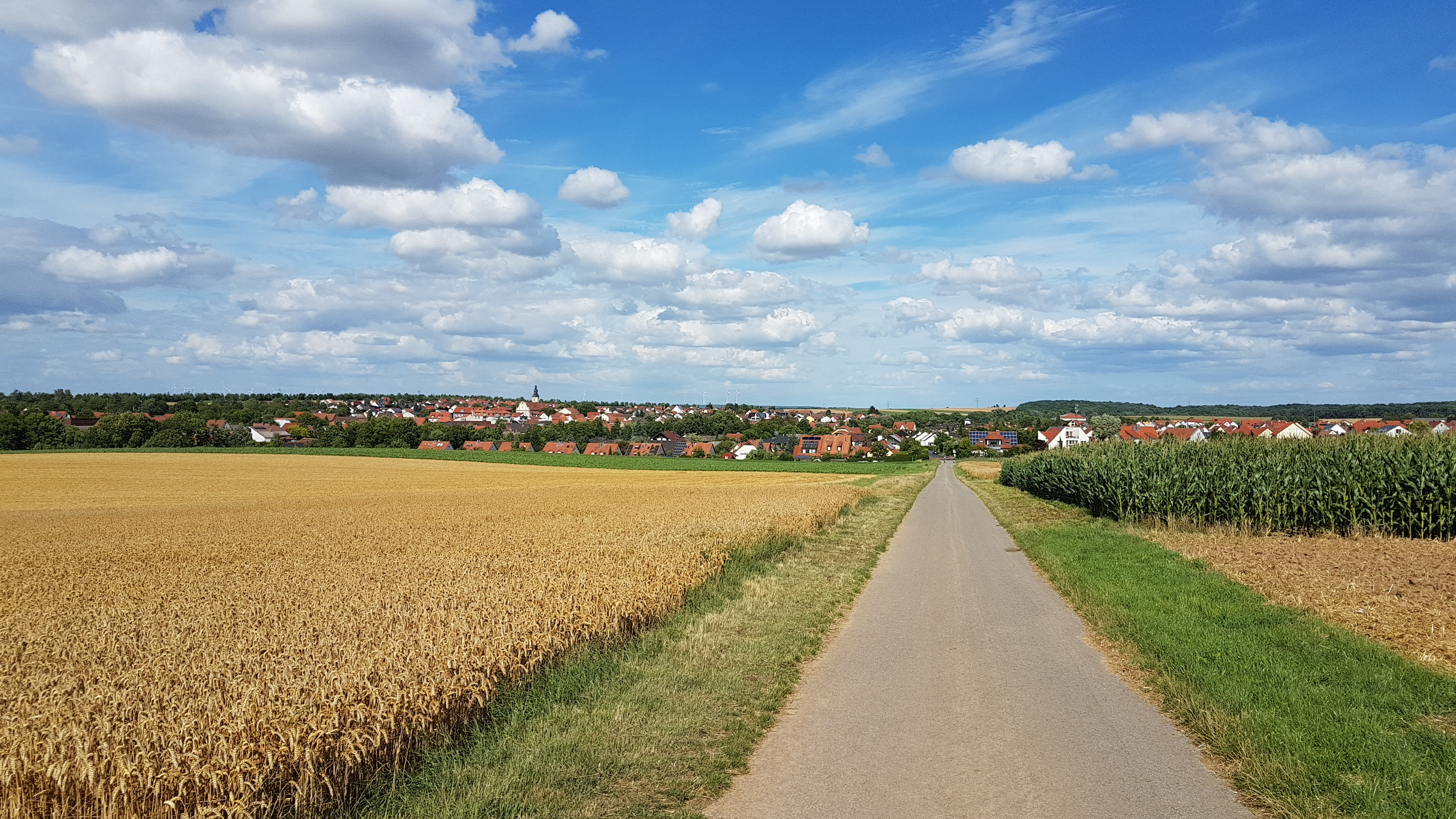
- General view of Kürnach

- Coat of arms

- Location of Kürnach within Würzburg district
- Interactive map of Kürnach
- Location within Germany Location within Bavaria
- Coordinates: 49°51′N 10°2′E
- Country: Germany
- State: Bavaria
- Admin. region: Unterfranken
- District: Würzburg

Government
  - Mayor (2020–26): René Wohlfart (SPD)

Area
  - Total: 12.29 km^{2} (4.75 sq mi)
- Elevation: 268 m (879 ft)

Population (2025-12-31)
  - Total: 4,541
  - Density: 369.5/km^{2} (957.0/sq mi)
- Time zone: UTC+01:00 (CET)
  - Summer (DST): UTC+02:00 (CEST)
- Postal codes: 97273
- Dialling codes: 09367
- Vehicle registration: WÜ
- Website: www.kuernach.de

Kürnach is a municipality in the district of Würzburg in Bavaria in Germany. The distance from Kürnach to the state capital of Bavaria München is about 221 km (137.6 miles).

== Population ==
Population of the municipality increased from 1904 to 2015.

Years	The number of inhabitants	Sources
1904	1237 inhabitants	
1950	1291 inhabitants	
1970	1754 inhabitants	
1987	2849 inhabitants	
1991	3020 inhabitants	
1995	3539 inhabitants	
2000	3991 inhabitants	
2005	4387 inhabitants	
2010	4466 inhabitants	
2015	4796 inhabitants	

== Gallery ==
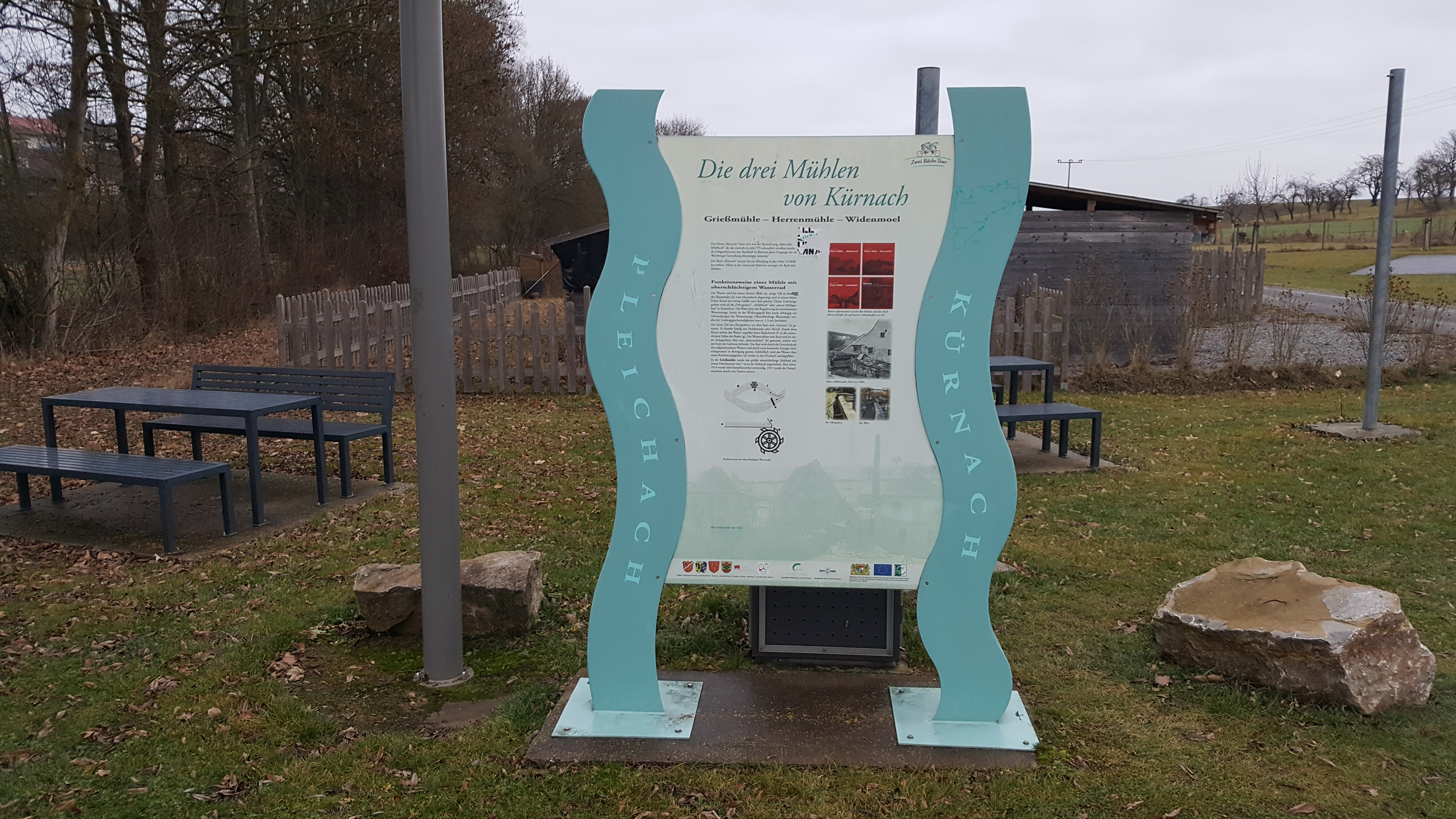

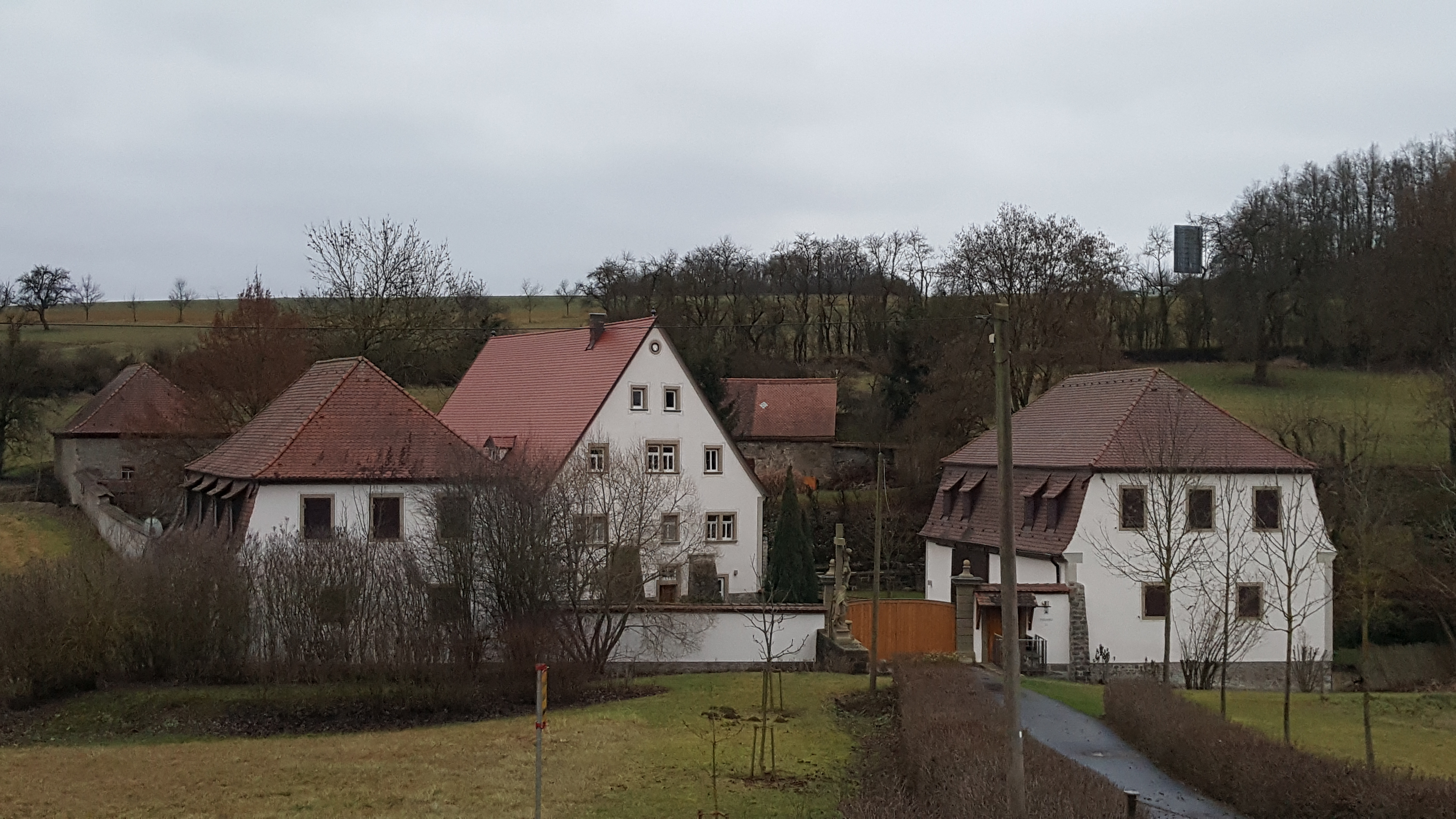

=== St Michael's Parish Church ===
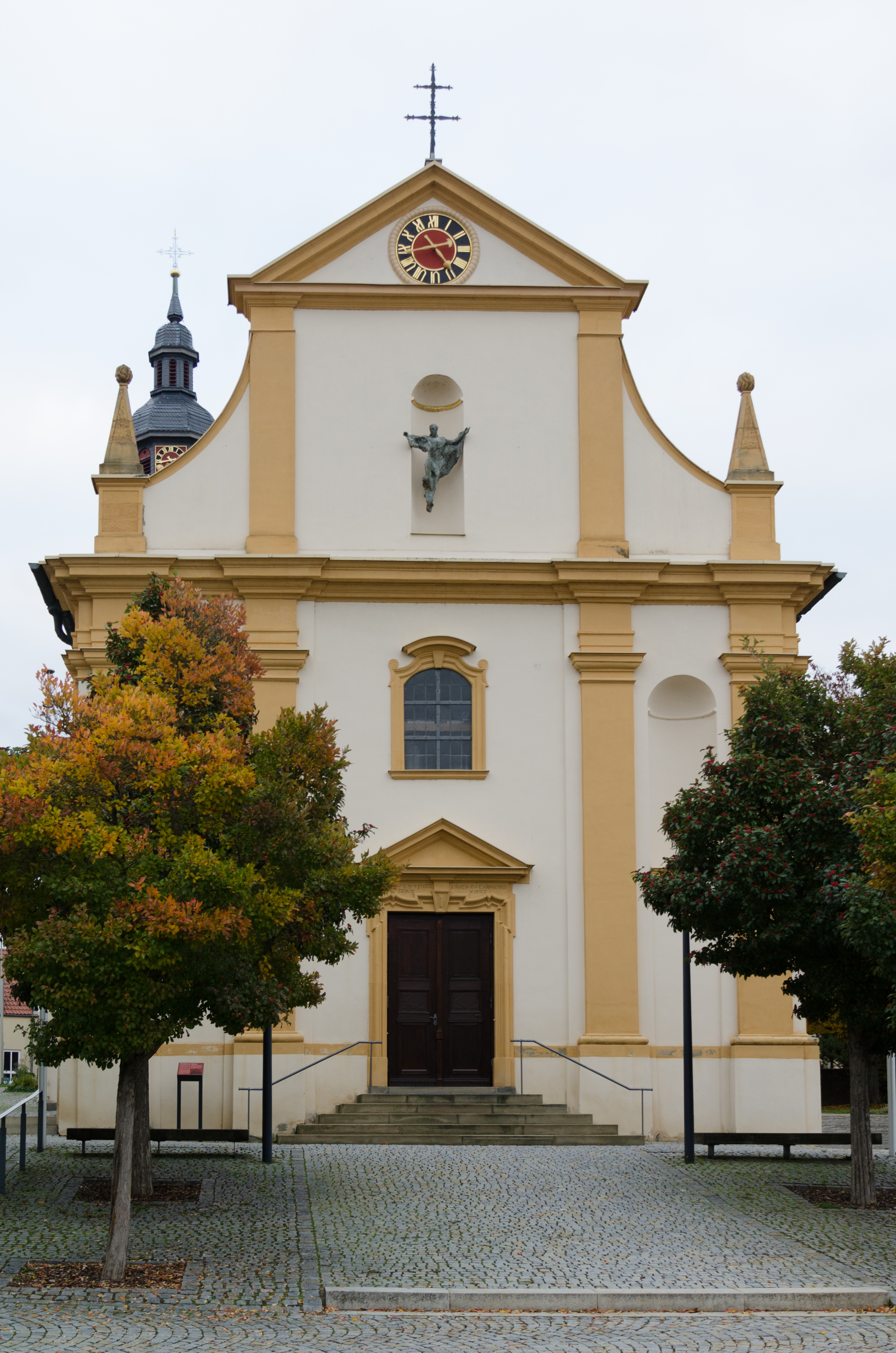

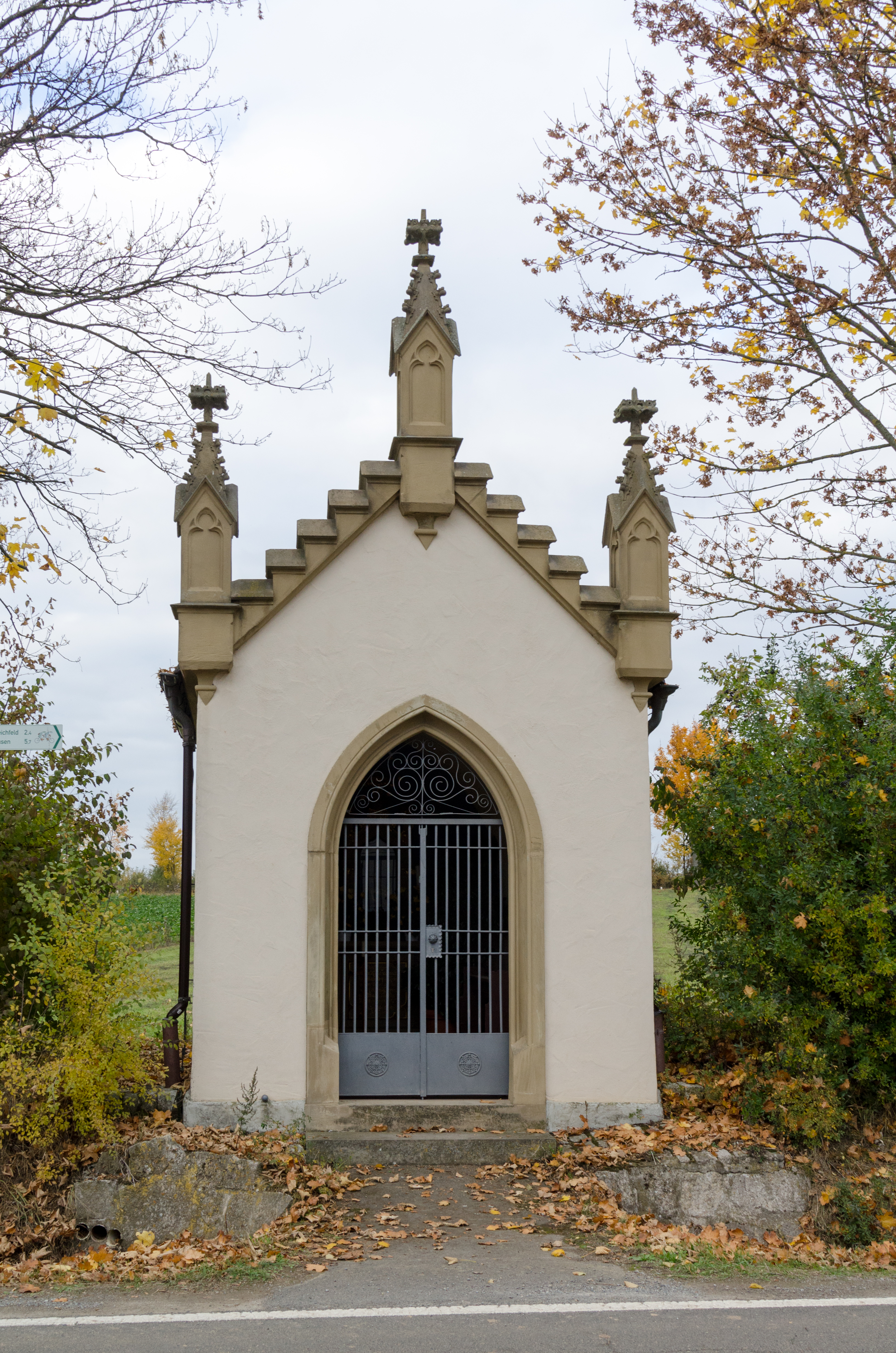

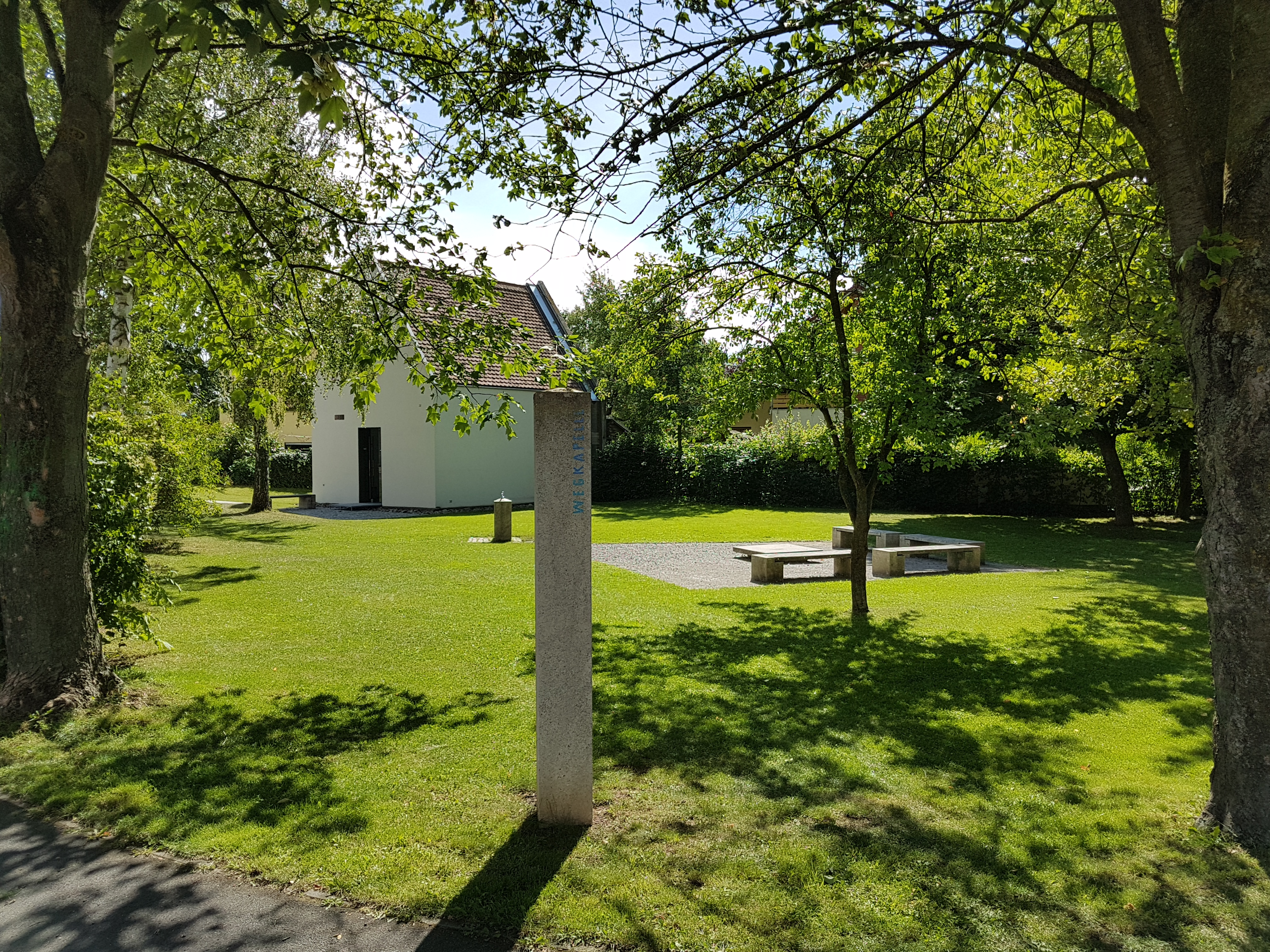

== Notable people ==
- Laurin Heinrich (born 2001), racing driver
