= Laurin Heinrich =

German racing driver (born 2001)

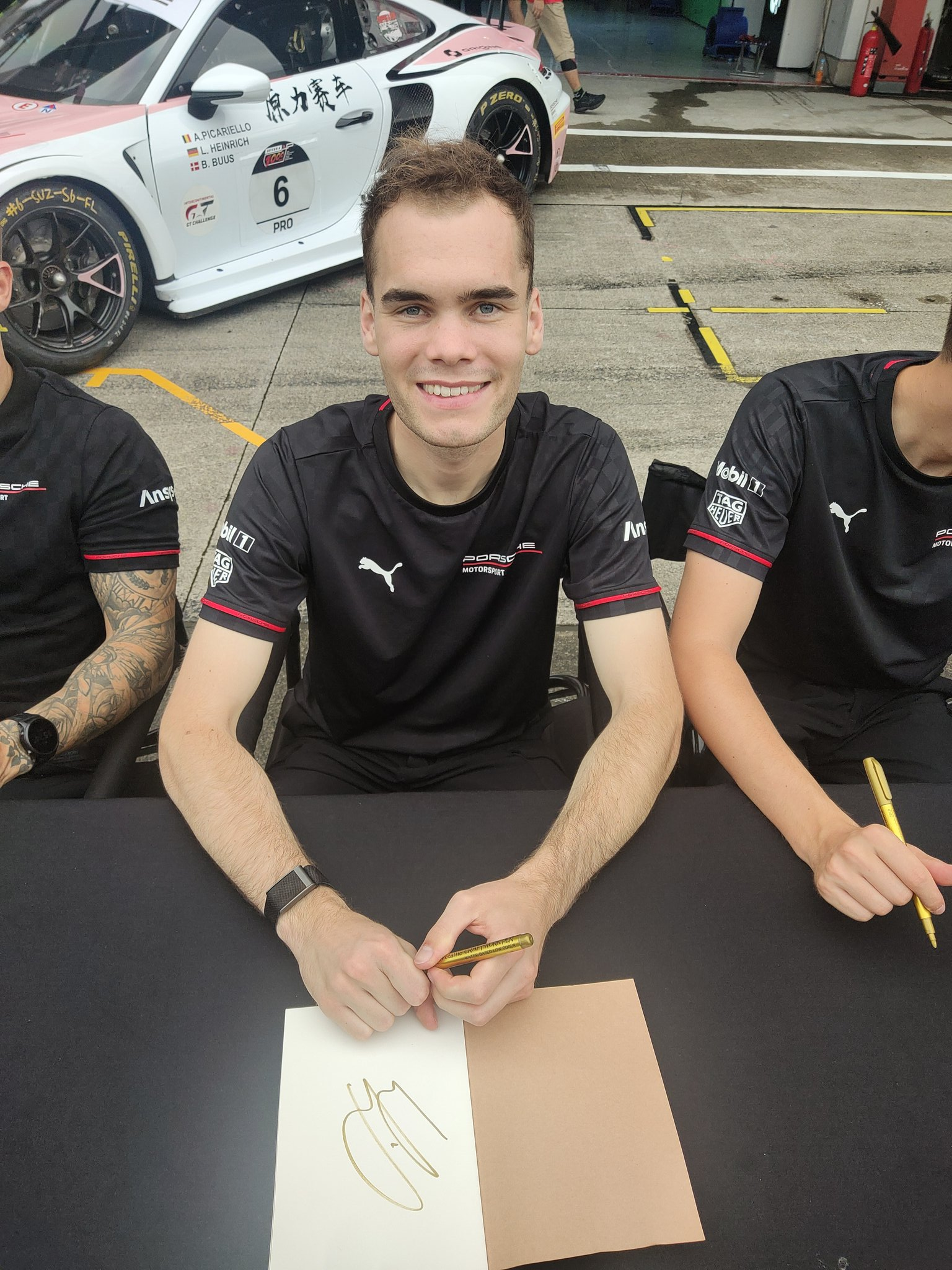
- Heinrich at Suzuka Circuit in 2025
- Nationality: German
- Born: 26 September 2001 (age 25) Kürnach, Germany

IMSA SportsCar Championship career
- Debut season: 2024
- Current team: Porsche Penske Motorsport; JDC-Miller MotorSports
- Categorisation: FIA Silver (until 2022); FIA Gold (2023–2026); FIA Platinum (2027–)
- Car number: 5
- Former teams: AO Racing
- Starts: 27
- Wins: 8
- Podiums: 12
- Poles: 2
- Best finish: 1st in 2024

Previous series
- 2017 2019: ADAC Formula 4 Porsche Super Sports Cup Germany

Championship titles
- 2019 2022 2024: Porsche Super Sports Cup Germany; Porsche Carrera Cup Germany; IMSA SportsCar Championship - GTD Pro
- Statistics up to date as of 22 April 2025.

Laurin Heinrich (born 26 September 2001) is a German racing driver who competes in the IMSA SportsCar Championship for Porsche Penske Motorsport and JDC–Miller MotorSports.

A homegrown talent from his selection as Porsche junior in 2022, Heinrich began his professional career in DTM and IMSA, and led "Rexy" to the GTD Pro title in 2024. He made his LMDh debut in late 2025, and won the 24 Hours of Daytona and 12 Hours of Sebring for Porsche Penske in 2026. Despite not planning to complete the season, Heinrich mounted a GTP title challenge with privateer JDC–Miller.

== Career ==
=== Early career ===
Heinrich began karting at the age of eight, initially as a hobby, before taking on the sport competitively as he grew older. As a child, Heinrich had aspirations of being a pilot rather than a racing driver, hence his early treatment of motorsports. The eventual itch to compete led him to club racing competition in his youth, undertaken alongside his father. After scoring titles in Swissauto kart competitions in his youth, Heinrich later cited his early aspirations as moving into Formula 4, which he fulfilled in 2017. At the age of 15, Heinrich entered the 2017 ADAC Formula 4 Championship with his family team, dubbed Heinrich Motorsport. The outfit was composed of Heinrich's karting mechanics – numbering just himself, his father, and three separate engineers – their numbers dwarfed by the larger European teams competing in the series. In his rookie season of Formula 4 competition, the small outfit struggled, with Heinrich finishing no higher than 14th overall in a race and electing to forego the final round of the season at the Hockenheimring. Heinrich wouldn't return to single-seater competition the following season, and didn't return to professional racing until 2019.

=== Porsche competition ===
In 2019, Heinrich took part in the Porsche Sports Cup Germany, claiming the 5E class title with six victories from ten races. In September, Heinrich made his debut in the Porsche Carrera Cup Germany, taking part in the Sachsenring round with CarTech Motorsport.

In 2020, Heinrich began competing full-time in the series, driving for T3/HRT Motorsport. The suspended and truncated season proved advantageous for Heinrich, as it permitted more time to secure sponsorship and reduced the required budget to field an entry. In September's joint-race between the German and French Carrera Cup competitions at Circuit de la Sarthe, Heinrich claimed his first podium in the German championship. He would secure three additional overall podiums that season, three of which occurred during the triple-header at the Red Bull Ring, finishing fourth in the overall points classification. He also secured the Rookie title, awarded to drivers taking part in the full-time championship for the first time. Heinrich also made his debut in the Porsche Supercup during the 2020 season, making two guest starts at the Red Bull Ring for MRS GT-Racing after one of the team's drivers was unable to enter the country due to COVID-19-related travel restrictions. Heinrich placed tenth in both events, but didn't score championship points as he was registered as a guest driver.

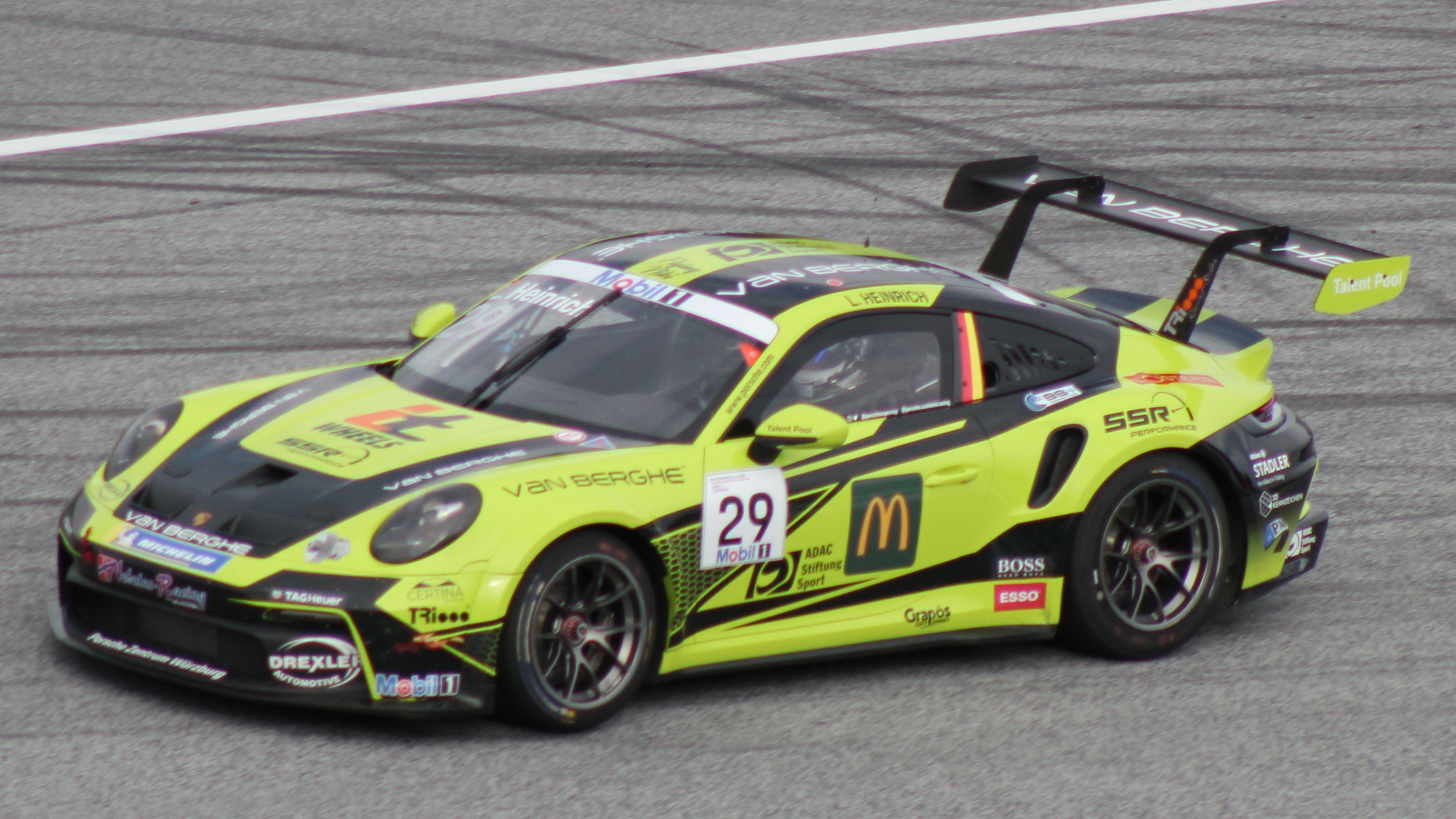
Heinrich competing in the Porsche Supercup at the Red Bull Ring in 2021

For 2021, Heinrich embarked on a dual program in both the globe-trotting Porsche Supercup and domestic Porsche Carrera Cup Germany, taking on both series with Huber Racing. Heinrich enjoyed an impressive rookie season in the former championship, taking his first ever Supercup victory at Zandvoort in September. Heinrich claimed additional podium finishes at Spa and Monza, finishing fourth in the overall championship and highest in the Rookie class. Domestically, Heinrich claimed his first Carrera Cup Germany victory in 2021 as well, taking overall honors in the second race at Oschersleben. During the next round at the Red Bull Ring, Heinrich claimed his second race victory and took the championship lead heading into the round at Monza. He would finish the season with eight total podiums from 15 races, taking fourth in the championship. At the end of 2021, Heinrich was selected to compete in the Porsche Junior Shootout at MotorLand Aragón. At the end of the competition, Heinrich was named as Porsche's Junior driver for the 2022 season, which featured a €225,000 scholarship towards a drive in the 2022 Porsche Supercup.

Heinrich began his Porsche Junior campaign with a drive in the Dubai 24 Hour, taking part in the 992 Am class with Huber Racing. 2022 saw Heinrich return to both the Porsche Supercup and Carrera Cup Germany, once again driving for Huber Racing. His Supercup campaign featured once race victory, at Silverstone, and four total podium finishes, taking a career-best third in the championship. The Carrera Cup Germany, however, saw Heinrich feature early and often at the front of the field. Over 16 races, Heinrich claimed six race victories, including a weekend sweep at Spa and the Sachsenring. After his double victory at the Sachsenring round, Heinrich secured the series championship with two races to spare. At the end of the 2022 season, Heinrich joined 311RS Motorsport to compete in the final round of the 2022 Porsche Carrera Cup North America, deputizing for Leh Keen. After crashing out of the first race of the weekend with brake problems, Heinrich won the second race.

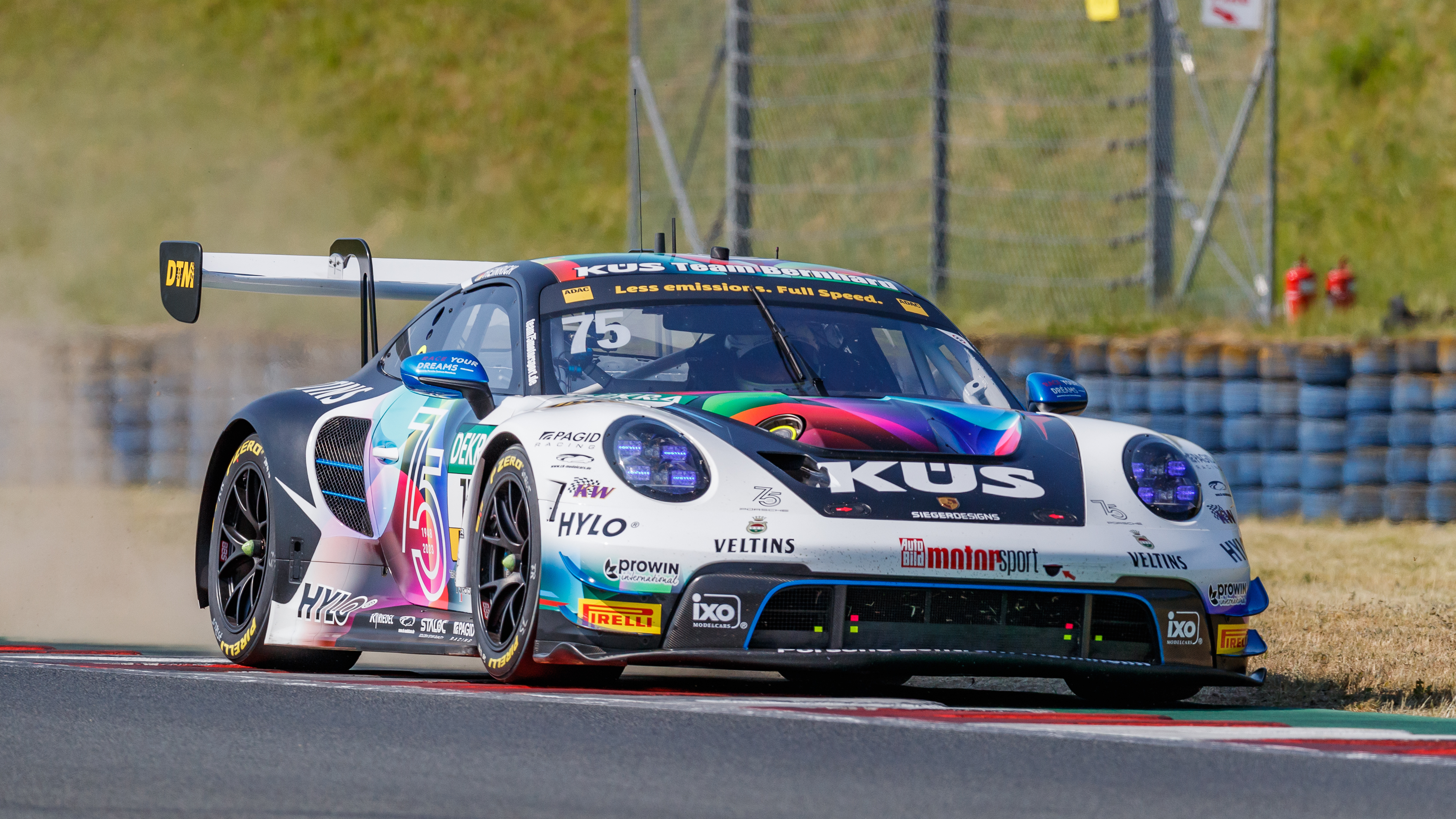
Heinrich's DTM Porsche at Oschersleben in 2023

Ahead of the 2023 season, Heinrich was promoted to contracted Porsche Driver status. Heinrich was also selected for financial support from the ADAC and DMSB as part of their Motorsport Team Germany program. With that backing, he took on a drive in the Deutsche Tourenwagen Masters for the first time in his career, piloting a Porsche 911 GT3 R for KÜS Team Bernhard. During his maiden season, Heinrich claimed two podium finishes, finishing second at both the Nürburgring and Red Bull Ring, adding his first pole position in the series in Austria as well. He supplemented his DTM program with a drive in the GT World Challenge Europe Endurance Cup with Rutronik Racing, joining Dennis Olsen and Thomas Preining in a Pro class entry. The trio claimed a single podium in the final round at Barcelona, finishing the season seventh in the overall points classification. Heinrich also added a one-off appearance in the Sprint Cup alongside Ayhancan Güven at Zandvoort.

A negative highlight of Heinrich's 2023 season came at the 24 Hours of Nürburgring. Making his debut for Dinamic GT, Heinrich lost control of his Porsche at night and crashed into the fan-favourite Dacia Logan at the Stefan Bellof S section of the Nordschleife. The damage to the Dacia was "irreparable", with Ollis Garage Racing quoted as saying "the project is dead". However, the car made a return in 2024 after a full rebuild. Heinrich was fined €3000 and apologised for the incident.

Heinrich's 2024 campaign saw him move stateside, as he partnered with Sebastian Priaulx in AO Racing's GTD Pro entry in the IMSA SportsCar Championship. He claimed a runner-up finish on debut at the 24 Hours of Daytona, before taking his maiden series victory two rounds later at Laguna Seca. The duo followed up with another victory during the ensuing round at Detroit, before Priaulx's Multimatic testing commitments forced him to step away from the program following July's race at Mosport. A rotating cast of Porsche factory drivers would join Heinrich for the remainder of the season, which was highlighted by his third win of the campaign in a rain-affected race at Indianapolis. The win meant Heinrich entered the final race at Road Atlanta with a 99-point lead over second-place Ross Gunn. Heinrich scored pole, gaining five points over Gunn, who qualified third. This pole proved critical, as electrical issues relegated Heinrich to an eleventh-place race finish, while Gunn finished third. Heinrich, in turn, claimed the GTD Pro championship by four points over the British driver.

Heinrich added a number of supplementary drives over the course of the season, including the majority of the GT World Challenge Europe Endurance Cup. He joined former DTM teammate Güven and Dorian Boccolacci in Schumacher CLRT's entry, scoring a best result of second at the Nürburgring in July. Heinrich also added a part-time drive in GT World Challenge Asia, scoring a victory at Sepang alongside two further podiums during his six-race stint paired with Origine Motorsport's Lu Wei. One-offs during the Indianapolis 8 Hour and FIA GT World Cup concluded a busy 2024 campaign for Heinrich.

At the end of the year, Heinrich was named Dailysportscar's 2024 GT Driver of the Year, and was also ranked in Autosport's Top 50 drivers of 2024.

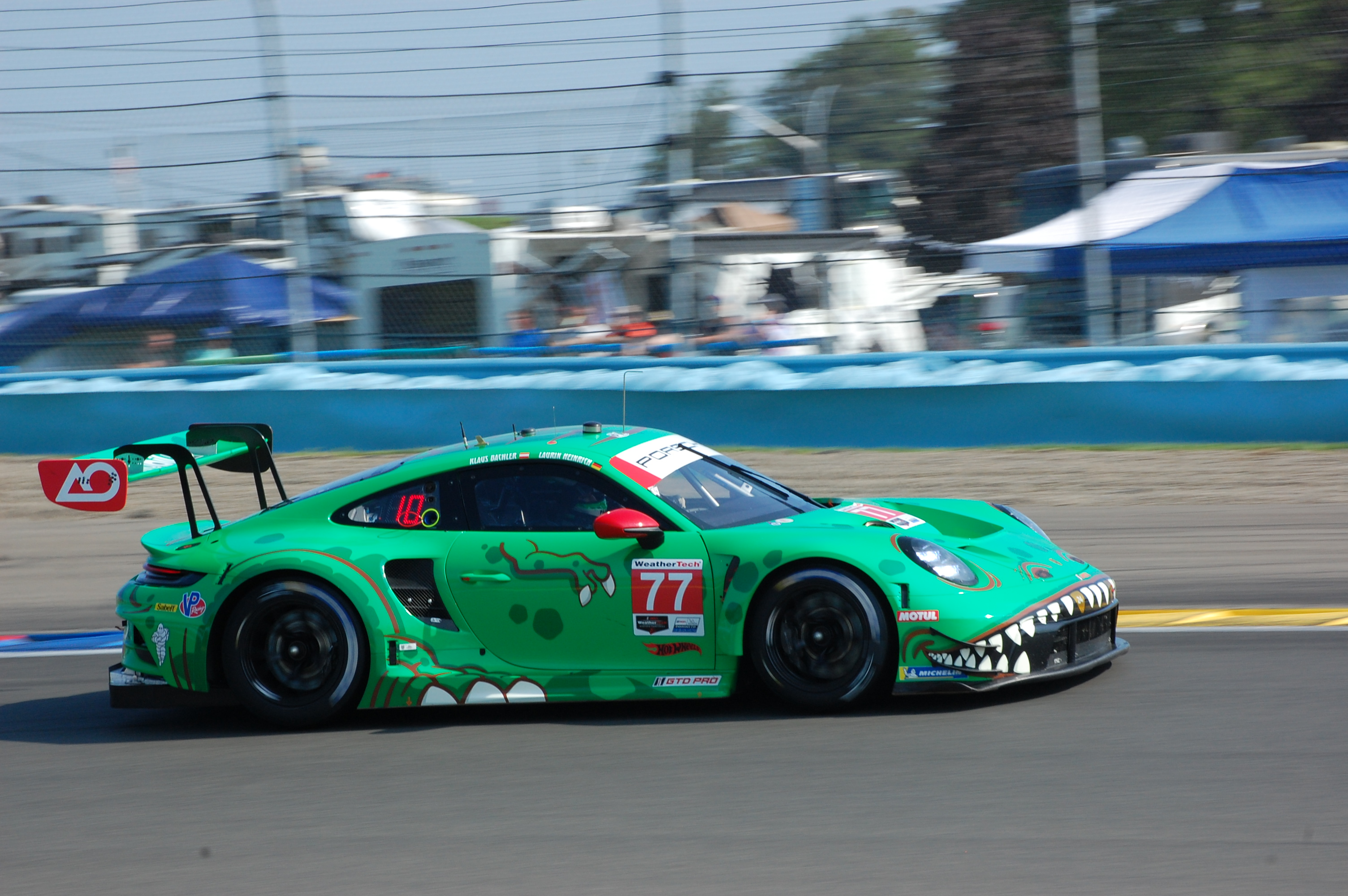
Heinrich behind the wheel of "Rexy" at Watkins Glen in 2025

Heinrich returned to defend his GTD Pro title in 2025, partnering Porsche factory driver Klaus Bachler for the full season. Following an eighth-place finish at Daytona, the duo scored AO's first endurance victory by taking a class win at the 2025 12 Hours of Sebring. Heinrich returned to victory lane the following round at Laguna Seca, before tallying another podium finish at Mosport in July. Following this event, Heinrich stated that he "better [understood]" IMSA racing, and counted himself a better driver than in his championship-winning debut season as a result. The duo concluded the season fifth in the drivers' championship, just over 300 points behind title winners Antonio García and Alexander Sims. Following Petit Le Mans, Heinrich first tested the Porsche 963 alongside the factory Porsche Penske Motorsport outfit, with eyes on a potential drive for 2026. Later that month, Porsche confirmed that Heinrich would make his WEC debut behind the wheel of a 963 during the season finale at Bahrain.

Heinrich also participated in GT World Challenge Europe in 2025, taking on a similar part-time schedule to his drive in 2024 with Schumacher CLRT. A part-time drive in the Thailand Super Series followed later that year, alongside one-offs at the Bathurst 12 Hour and Suzuka 1000 km. Heinrich also returned to the Indianapolis 8 Hour and FIA GT World Cup, scoring a podium finish in the latter. Heinrich additionally took part in development work for the updated Porsche 911 GT3 R and 911 GT3 Cup cars over the course of the year.

==== Factory promotion and GTP drive (2026–) ====
Ahead of 2026, Heinrich was named to Porsche's factory driver roster, having previously held 'Porsche-contracted' status. This coincided with his promotion to Porsche Penske Motorsport's GTP driver roster, where he would take on the Michelin Endurance Cup rounds in the No. 7 entry alongside Julien Andlauer and Felipe Nasr.

Heinrich competed with JDC-Miller MotorSports during the 2026 Sahlen's Six Hours of The Glen, where he finished third

A mid-season agreement with Porsche customer team JDC–Miller MotorSports would see Heinrich drive for the privateer squad in the 160-minute rounds alongside Tijmen van der Helm. In the final lap of the 2026 Monterey SportsCar Championship at Laguna Seca, Heinrich completed a crucial pass for the lead on Earl Bamber's No. 31 Cadillac V-Series.R, helping JDC–Miller MotorSports become the first privateer team to win in the GTP era of the IMSA SportsCar Championship.

He was drafted back to Porsche's senior team ahead of the 2026 IMSA Battle on the Bricks, with Team Penske President Jonathan Diuguid citing the opportunity for Heinrich to win the GTP drivers' championship for Porsche as the highest placed factory driver in the drivers' standings. At the time of the transfer, Heinrich was second overall behind championship rival Jack Aitken. He eventually concluded his first full season in the GTP class as runner-up.

=== Sim racing ===
Heinrich describes himself as a 'hybrid driver,' and he frequently competes in officially-sanctioned sim racing events alongside his real-world endeavors. From a young age, he competed in high-level virtual motorsports, taking part in the Blancpain GT Series on iRacing while competing in the real-world ADAC Formula 4 Championship. Heinrich also competed in the 2022–23 Le Mans Virtual Series, contributing to Porsche Team Coanda's championship victory with a victory at Sebring and a runner-up finish in the season finale at Le Mans.

== Racing record ==
=== Career summary ===
Season	Series	Team	Races	Wins	Poles	F/Laps	Podiums	Points	Position
2017	ADAC Formula 4 Championship	Heinrich Motorsport	10	0	0	0	0	0	27th
2017	ADAC Formula 4 Championship	Rennsport Rössler	6	0	0	0	0	0	27th
2019	Porsche Sports Cup Germany - 5E	Team Speed Monkeys	10	6	5	8	9	221	**1st**
2019	Porsche Carrera Cup Germany	Team CarTech Motorsport by Nigrin	2	0	0	0	0	0	NC†
2020	Porsche Carrera Cup Germany	T3/HRT Motorsport	10	0	1	0	5	117	4th
2020	Porsche Supercup	MRS GT-Racing	2	0	0	0	0	0	NC†
2021	Porsche Carrera Cup Germany	VAN BERGHE Huber Racing	15	2	1	2	8	214	4th
2021	Porsche Supercup	Nebulus Racing by Huber	8	1	1	1	3	110	4th
2022	Porsche Carrera Cup Germany	SSR Huber Racing	16	6	3	7	12	297	**1st**
2022	Porsche Supercup	SSR Huber Racing	8	1	0	1	4	123	**3rd**
2022	Porsche Carrera Cup North America	311RS Motorsport	2	1	2	2	1	0	NC†
2022	Nürburgring Endurance Series - AT(-G)	Four Motors Bioconcept-Car	2	0	0	2	2	?	?
2022	24H GT Series - 992	Huber Racing	1	0	0	0	0	?	?
2023	Deutsche Tourenwagen Masters	KÜS Team Bernhard	16	0	1	1	2	94	12nd
2023	GT World Challenge Europe Endurance Cup	Rutronik Racing	5	0	0	1	1	38	7th
2023	GT World Challenge Europe Sprint Cup	CLRT	2	0	0	0	0	0.5	23rd
2023	Intercontinental GT Challenge	Rutronik Racing	1	0	0	0	0	20	18th
2023	Intercontinental GT Challenge	Huber Motorsport	1	0	1	0	0	20	18th
2023	24H GT Series - GT3	Herberth Motorsport	1	0	0	0	1	0	NC†
2023	Nürburgring Langstrecken-Serie - SP9	Dinamic GT	2	0	0	0	0	0	NC†
2023	24 Hours of Nürburgring - SP9	Dinamic GT	1	0	0	0	0	N/A	DNF
2023-24	Asian Le Mans Series - GT	Herberth Motorsport	3	0	0	0	0	13	18th
2024	GT World Challenge Europe Endurance Cup	Schumacher CLRT	4	0	0	0	1	18	15th
2024	IMSA SportsCar Championship - GTD Pro	AO Racing	10	3	2	1	5	3122	**1st**
2024	GT World Challenge Asia	Origine Motorsport	6	1	1	?	3	74	7th
2024	GT World Challenge America - Pro	Wright Motorsports	1	0	0	0	1	50	7th
2024	FIA GT World Cup	Schumacher CLRT	2	0	0	0	0	N/A	13rd
2024	Intercontinental GT Challenge	Schumacher CLRT	1	0	0	0	0	18	14th
2024	Intercontinental GT Challenge	Wright Motorsports	1	0	0	0	1	18	14th
2024-25	Asian Le Mans Series - GT	Origine Motorsport	6	0	0	0	0	29	12nd
2025	IMSA SportsCar Championship - GTD Pro	AO Racing	10	2	0	1	3	2963	5th
2025	GT World Challenge Europe Endurance Cup	Schumacher CLRT	3	0	0	0	1	31	11st
2025	FIA GT World Cup	Schumacher CLRT	2	0	0	0	1	N/A	**3rd**
2025	FIA World Endurance Championship - Hypercar	Porsche Penske Motorsport	1	0	0	0	0	0	NC†
2025	GT World Challenge America - Pro	Wright Motorsports	1	0	0	0	0	0	NC†
2025	Intercontinental GT Challenge	The Bend Manthey EMA	1	0	0	0	0	14	24th
2025	Intercontinental GT Challenge	Schumacher CLRT	1	0	0	0	0	14	24th
2025	Intercontinental GT Challenge	Origine Motorsport	1	0	0	0	0	14	24th
2025	Intercontinental GT Challenge	Wright Motorsports	1	0	0	0	0	14	24th
2025	24H Series - SP4	Herberth Motorsport	1	1	1	1	1	0	NC†
2025	TSS The Super Series - GT3	AAS Motorsport by EBM	10	4	2	0	9	154	**3rd**
2025-26	Asian Le Mans Series - GT	Origine Motorsport	6	0	0	0	2	58	6th
2026	IMSA SportsCar Championship - GTP	Porsche Penske Motorsport	4	2	0	1	3	2859	**2nd**
2026	IMSA SportsCar Championship - GTP	JDC–Miller MotorSports	5	1	0	1	3	2859	**2nd**
2026	24 Hours of Nürburgring - SP9	Lionspeed GP	1	0	0	0	0	N/A	4th
2026	GT World Challenge Asia	Origine Motorsport	6	2	1	1	5	110	5th
2026	Shanghai 8 Hours	Origine Motorsport	1	0	0	0	0	N/A	DNF
2026	European Le Mans Series - LMGT3	High Class Racing	1	0	0	0	0	0	35th
2026	24 Hours of Le Mans - LMP2 Pro-Am	Crowdstrike Racing by APR	1	1	1	0	1	N/A	**1st**
2026	GT World Challenge America - Pro-Am	Wright Motorsports	1	0	0	0	0	0	NC†
2026	Intercontinental GT Challenge	EBM	1	0	0	0	0	56	4th
2026	Intercontinental GT Challenge	Lionspeed GP	1	0	0	0	1	56	4th
2026	Intercontinental GT Challenge	AO by Absolute Racing	1	1	0	0	1	56	4th
2026	Intercontinental GT Challenge	Wright Motorsports	1	0	0	0	0	56	4th
2026	FIA GT World Cup	AO by Absolute Racing							
2026-27	Asian Le Mans Series - LMP2	CrowdStrike Racing by APR							

^{*} Season still in progress.

=== Complete ADAC Formula 4 Championship results ===
(key) (Races in bold indicate pole position) (Races in italics indicate fastest lap)

Year	Team	1	2	3	4	5	6	7	8	9	10	11	12	13	14	15	16	17	18	19	20	21	Pos	Points
2017	Heinrich Motorsport	OSC1; 1; 24	OSC1; 2; 18	OSC1; 3; 16	LAU; 1 Ret	LAU; 2; 15	LAU; 3; 14	RBR; 1 Ret	RBR; 2; 18	RBR; 3; 16							SAC; 1 Ret	SAC; 2 DNS	SAC; 3 DNS	HOC; 1	HOC; 2	HOC; 3	27th	0
2017	Rennsport Rössler										OSC2; 1; 22	OSC2; 2; 25	OSC2; 3; 23	NÜR; 1; 22	NÜR; 2; 24	NÜR; 3; 24							27th	0

=== Complete Porsche Supercup results ===
(key) (Races in bold indicate pole position) (Races in italics indicate fastest lap)

Year	Team	1	2	3	4	5	6	7	8	Pos.	Points
2020	MRS GT-Racing	RBR; 10	RBR; 10	HUN	SIL	SIL	CAT	SPA	MNZ	NC	0
2021	Huber Racing	MON; 14	RBR; 8	RBR; 4	HUN; 5	SPA; 3	**ZND**; 1	MNZ; 5	MNZ; 2	4th	110
2022	SSR Huber Racing	IMO; 4	MON; 3	SIL; 1	RBR; 2	LEC; 5	SPA; 3	ZND; 5	MNZ; 10	3rd	123

=== Complete 24 Hours of Nürburgring results ===
Year	Team	Co-Drivers	Car	Class	Laps	Pos.	Class Pos.
2023	(Italy) Dinamic GT	(Germany) Christian Engelhart (Turkey) Ayhancan Güven (Belgium) Laurens Vanthoor	Porsche 911 GT3 R (992)	SP9; Pro	83	DNF	DNF
2026	(Germany) Lionspeed GP	(Switzerland) Ricardo Feller (Belgium) Laurens Vanthoor	Porsche 911 GT3 R (992.2)	SP9; Pro	156	5th	4th

=== Complete GT World Challenge Europe results ===
==== GT World Challenge Europe Endurance Cup ====
Year	Team	Car	Class	1	2	3	4	5	6	7	Pos.	Points
2023	Rutronik Racing	Porsche 911 GT3 R (992)	Pro	MNZ; 10	LEC; Ret	SPA; 6H; 12	SPA; 12H; 8	SPA; 24H; 5	NÜR; 5	CAT; 3	7th	38
2024	Schumacher CLRT	Porsche 911 GT3 R (992)	Pro	LEC; 14	SPA; 6H; 58†	SPA; 12H; Ret	SPA; 24H; Ret	NÜR; 2	MNZ	JED; Ret	15th	18
2025	Schumacher CLRT	Porsche 911 GT3 R (992)	Pro	LEC; 3	MNZ	SPA; 6H; 73†	SPA; 12H; 73†	SPA; 24H; Ret	NÜR; 4	CAT	11th	31

==== GT World Challenge Europe Sprint Cup ====
Year	Team	Car	Class	1	2	3	4	5	6	7	8	9	10	Pos.	Points
2023	CLRT	Porsche 911 GT3 R (992)	Pro	BRH; 1	BRH; 2	MIS; 1	MIS; 2	HOC; 1	HOC; 2	VAL; 1	VAL; 2	ZAN; 1; 16	ZAN; 2; 10	23rd	0.5

=== Complete Deutsche Tourenwagen Masters results ===
(key) (Races in bold indicate pole position) (Races in italics indicate fastest lap)

Year	Entrant	Chassis	1	2	3	4	5	6	7	8	9	10	11	12	13	14	15	16	Rank	Points
2023	KÜS Team Bernhard	Porsche 911 GT3 R (992)	OSC; 1; 7	OSC; 2; 9	ZAN; 1 Ret	ZAN; 2 Ret	NOR; 1; 10	NOR; 2; 7	NÜR; 1; 19	NÜR; 2; 2	LAU; 1 DSQ	LAU; 2 Ret	SAC; 1; 12	SAC; 2 Ret	**RBR**; **1**; 2^{1}	RBR; 2; 16	HOC; 1; 10	HOC; 2; 6	12th	94

=== Complete Asian Le Mans Series results ===
(key) (Races in bold indicate pole position) (Races in italics indicate fastest lap)

Year	Team	Class	Car	Engine	1	2	3	4	5	6	Pos.	Points
2023–24	Herberth Motorsport	GT	Porsche 911 GT3 R (992)	Porsche 4.2 L Flat-6	SEP; 1	SEP; 2	DUB; 9	ABU; 1; 5	ABU; 2; 10		18th	13
2024–25	Origine Motorsport	GT	Porsche 911 GT3 R (992)	Porsche 4.2 L Flat-6	SEP; 1 Ret	SEP; 2; 5	DUB; 2; 4	DUB; 2; 8	ABU; 1; 12	ABU; 2; 24	12th	29
2025–26	Origine Motorsport	GT	Porsche 911 GT3 R (992)	Porsche 4.2 L Flat-6	SEP; 1; 6	SEP; 2; 3	DUB; 1; 10	DUB; 2; 2	ABU; 1; 4	ABU; 2; 17	6th	58

=== Complete IMSA SportsCar Championship results ===
(key) (Races in bold indicate pole position)

Year	Team	Class	Make	Engine	1	2	3	4	5	6	7	8	9	10	Rank	Points
2024	AO Racing	GTD Pro	Porsche 911 GT3 R (992)	Porsche 4.2 L Flat-6	**DAY**; 2	SEB; 9	LGA; 1	DET; 1	WGL; 6	MOS; 3	ELK; 4	VIR; 7	IMS; 1	**ATL**; 11	1st	3122
2025	AO Racing	GTD Pro	Porsche 911 GT3 R (992)	Porsche 4.2 L Flat-6	DAY; 8	SEB; 1	LGA; 1	DET; 5	WGL; 5	MOS; 3	ELK; 8	VIR; 5	IMS; 7	ATL; 8	5th	2963
2026	Porsche Penske Motorsport	GTP	Porsche 963	Porsche 9RD 4.6 L V8	DAY; 1	SEB; 1						IMS; 3	PET; 8		2nd	2859
2026	JDC–Miller MotorSports	GTP	Porsche 963	Porsche 9RD 4.6 L V8			LBH; 6	LGA; 1	DET; 11	WGL; 3	ELK; 2				2nd	2859

=== Complete Bathurst 12 Hour results ===
Year	Team	Co-Drivers	Car	Class	Laps	Pos.	Class Pos.
2025	(New Zealand) The Bend Manthey EMA	(Netherlands) Morris Schuring (Australia) Sam Shahin (Australia) Yasser Shahin	Porsche 911 GT3 R (992)	Pro-Am	303	10th	2nd
2026	(New Zealand) EBM	(Austria) Klaus Bachler (Switzerland) Ricardo Feller	Porsche 911 GT3 R (992)	Pro	262	8th	6th

=== Complete FIA World Endurance Championship results ===
(key) (Races in bold indicate pole position; races in italics indicate fastest lap)

Year	Entrant	Class	Chassis	Engine	1	2	3	4	5	6	7	8	Rank	Points
2025	Porsche Penske Motorsport	Hypercar	Porsche 963	Porsche 4.6 L Turbo V8	QAT	IMO	SPA	LMS	SÃO	COA	FUJ	BHR; 14	33th	0

=== Complete European Le Mans Series results ===
(key) (Races in bold indicate pole position; races in italics indicate fastest lap)

Year	Entrant	Class	Chassis	Engine	1	2	3	4	5	6	Rank	Points
2026	High Class Racing	LMGT3	Porsche 911 GT3 R (992.2)	Porsche 4.2 L Flat-6	CAT; 11	LEC	IMO	SPA	SIL	ALG	35th	0

=== Complete 24 Hours of Le Mans results ===
Year	Team	Co-Drivers	Car	Class	Laps	Pos.	Class Pos.
2026	(United States) CrowdStrike Racing by APR	(United States) George Kurtz (United Kingdom) Alex Quinn	Oreca 07-Gibson	LMP2	358	21st	7th
2026	(United States) CrowdStrike Racing by APR	(United States) George Kurtz (United Kingdom) Alex Quinn	Oreca 07-Gibson	LMP2 Pro-Am	358	21st	**1st**

Sporting positions
Preceded by Larry ten Voorde	Porsche Carrera Cup Germany; Champion; 2022	Succeeded by Larry ten Voorde
Preceded by Jack Hawksworth; Ben Barnicoat	IMSA SportsCar Championship; GTD Pro Champion; 2024	Succeeded by Antonio García; Alexander Sims
