= 2025 FIA GT World Cup =

Sports car race

Race details
Date	16 November 2025
Official name	Macau GT Cup – FIA GT World Cup
Location	Guia Circuit, Macau
Course	Temporary street circuit 6.120 km (3.803 mi)
Distance	Qualification Race; 12 laps, 73.440 km (45.634 mi); Main Race; 16 laps, 97.920 km (60.845 mi)
- Qualification Race

Pole
Driver	Antonio Fuoco (ITA)	AF Corse SRL
Time	2:15.535

Fastest lap
Driver	Yifei Ye (CHN)	Harmony Racing
Time	2:16.674

Podium
First	Antonio Fuoco (ITA)	AF Corse SRL
Second	Yifei Ye (CHN)	Harmony Racing
Third	Alessio Picariello (BEL)	Tempo by Absolute Racing
- Main Race

Fastest lap
Driver	Antonio Fuoco (ITA)	AF Corse SRL
Time	2:16.581

Podium
First	Antonio Fuoco (ITA)	AF Corse SRL
Second	Raffaele Marciello (CHE)	Rowe Racing
Third	Laurin Heinrich (DEU)	Schumacher CLRT

The 2025 FIA GT World Cup (formally the Macau GT Cup – FIA GT World Cup) was a Grand Touring (GT) sports car race held on the Guia Circuit in Macau on 16 November 2025. It was the eighth FIA GT World Cup and the fifteenth GT3 car race to be held in Macau. The race was co-organised by the SRO Motorsports Group and was sanctioned by the Fédération Internationale de l'Automobile (FIA). The edition included two races, with a 12-lap qualifying race setting the 16-lap main race's starting order.

Antonio Fuoco of AF Corse SRL won the main race after also winning the previous day's qualification race that he started from pole position after setting the fastest lap time in the Super Pole position. Fuoco led both races from start to finish, steering clear of multiple first lap crashes further back in the field in the main race. Raffaele Marciello finished second for Rowe Racing and Laurin Heinrich came in third for Schumacher CLRT.

== Background and entry list ==
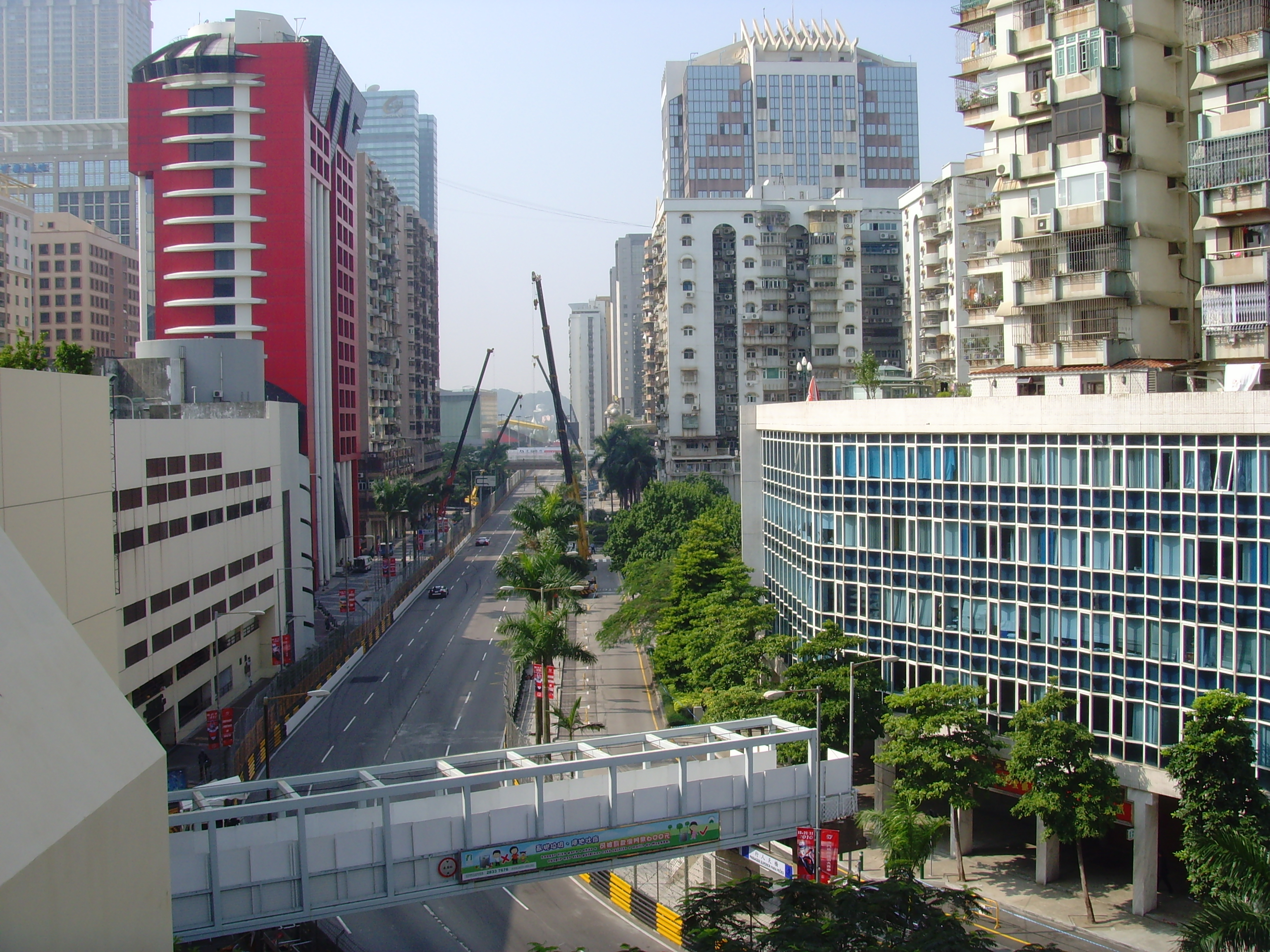
The Guia Circuit, where the race was held.

A meeting of the FIA World Motor Sport Council on 26 February 2025 confirmed the running of the 2025 FIA GT World Cup. It was the eighth running of the event since its first running as an Fédération Internationale de l'Automobile (FIA)-sanctioned race in 2015 except for between 2020 and 2022 due to restrictions brought about by the COVID-19 pandemic. The event was also the 15th for GT3-specification cars since 2008 and an undercard to the 2025 Macau Grand Prix. It was held at the 22-turn 6.120 km (3.803 mi) Guia Circuit in the streets of the Chinese special administrative region of Macau. The main race took place on 16 November after three days of practice and qualifying. The race was co-organised by the FIA and the GT-racing promoter SRO Motorsports Group. Pirelli was the event's control tyre supplier.

An FIA-mandated torque sensor measuring power output had to be installed on the driveshafts of every car for the race. This was employed in the enforcement of balance of performance (BoP) to ensure that cars did not surpass the BoP-allocated values and that performance was not effected by outside variables such as atmospheric conditions. The GT3 Technical Working Group manufacturers were consulted prior to the installation of required torque sensors. As torque sensors increased their operating costs, most teams did not use them in other types of racing.

To enter the event, drivers must have competed in an FIA-recognised GT3 championship race within the previous two seasons or have extensive expertise in Grand Touring (GT) competition. Platinum, Gold, Silver and Bronze-rated drivers were allowed to compete, however the FIA GT World Cup Committee may deny a competitor's entrance if they are deemed inexperienced. From 14 May until 21 July 2025, the FIA accepted entries for the event; a selection committee determined the entry list. The entry list was published by the Macau Grand Prix Organizing Committee on 13 October. There were six manufacturers (Audi, BMW, Ferrari, Lamborghini, McLaren and Porsche) and 16 drivers from 12 different nationalities in the race, down from 23 the year before. Porsche were the best-represented manufacturer with five cars. Three former race winners—Raffaele Marciello, Edoardo Mortara and Laurens Vanthoor—as well as eight FIA platinum-ranked drivers participated. The introduction of torque sensors made it impossible for Mercedes-AMG, the previous year's winner, to acquire a large sum of money and resources quickly enough to compete in Macau, hence they were not present for the first time. Augusto Farfus was set to compete until his squad Team KRC withdrew. Insiders attributed the decline in entries to the additional expenses associated with installing torque sensors.

== Practice and qualifying ==
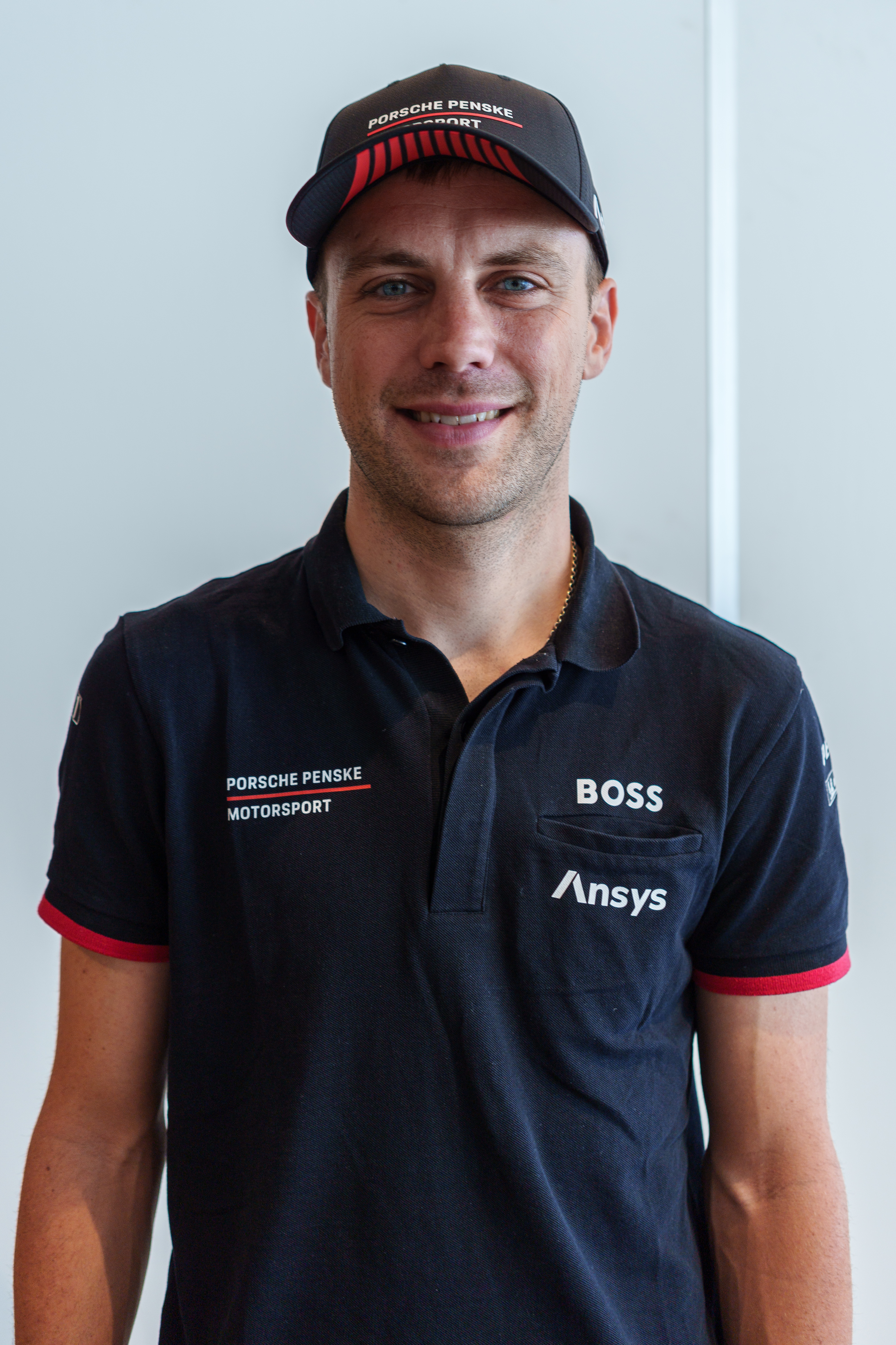
Laurens Vanthoor (pictured in 2024) was fastest in the first practice session but crashed during the session.

Two practice sessions were held on 13 November, a 35-minute session in the morning and a 30-minute session in the afternoon. In the first practice session. Vanthoor lapped fastest with a time of 2:16.451 set during the final ten minutes, the only sub-2:17 lap of the session. Vanthoor was 0.755 seconds faster than Yifei Ye in second. Marciello was third, ahead of Adderly Fong in fourth and Sheldon van der Linde in fifth. Vanthoor was attempting to set a faster lap time when he lost control of his Porsche during the fast right-hand Mandarin Bend turn with four minutes remaining. He was sent spinning multiple times when the car's rear swung around and he struck the outside Tecpro barrier at the turn's exit, and littering the circuit with debris. Vanthoor exited the car unhurt and did not need assistance; the session was stopped prematurely by race control with three-and-a-half minutes remaining, so that the marshals could remove debris from the track. Vanthoor's car was severely damaged in the collision and was brought back to the paddock for evaluation, thus he did not take part in the second practice session. Alessio Picariello set the day's fastest lap time of 2:15.966 with fewer than six minutes to go in the second practice session, and he was the only driver to lap below 2:16. Marciello traded fastest laps with Picariello, who was 0.173 seconds slower in second, ahead of Van der Linde, Ayhancan Güven and Laurin Heinrich. Although the session was not stopped, Antonio Fuoco's Ferrari sustained a puncture.

A revised qualifying format for the Macau event was introduced, consisting of only two single qualifying sessions (instead of the solitary qualifying session in the previous editions). The ten quickest drivers in the 30-minute first qualifying session would advance to the second qualifying session, known as "Super Pole". The ten "Super Pole" qualifiers saw each car on the circuit individually without any interference and was allowed two qualifying laps as well as a new set of tyres to set the starting order for the qualifying race. Joel Eriksson was the fastest driver to advance to Super Pole with the only sub-2:16 lap time of 2:15.927 after battling Picariello and Heinrich for the fastest time. Fuoco was second and was fastest until Eriksson's lap. Marciello, Picariello, Güven, Ye, Heinrich, Mortara, Christopher Haase and Luca Engstler were the final qualifiers. Eight minutes in, Van der Linde braked too late and understeered into the Moorish outside tyre wall at the turn's exit. Since he was unable to extricate himself, qualifying was immediately stopped to allow for car recovery. Benjamin Goethe and Güven almost hit the stricken car. Dorian Boccolacci had a lap time nullified for exceeding the maximum permitted power, allowing Engstler to qualify for Super Pole. Vanthoor's repaired car, Goethe, Adderly Fong and Deng Yi were the other four drivers who did not reach Super Pole. In Super Pole, where the second lap was normally quicker, Fuoco was the ninth driver on track and achieved Ferrari's first FIA GT World Cup pole position with a 2:15.535 lap. His brandmate Ye was 0.274 seconds behind in second and held pole position until Fuoco's effort. Mortara committed to risks and was the final driver to set a sub-2:16 lap for provisional third. Picariello lost time at Fisherman's Bend turn and was fourth, precisely 0.5 seconds behind Fuoco. Eriksson, in his first FIA GT World Cup entry since 2019, was the last driver on track but was unable to replicate his first qualifying performance because of understeer in the final turn and came fifth. Marciello, Güven, Heinrich, Engstler and Haase completed the top ten qualifiers. There were no accidents in Super Pole.

=== Post-qualifying ===
Mortara's qualifying performance was investigated and his best lap time was invalidated due to a technical infraction involving his car exceeding the maximum allowed power. He was thus demoted to tenth and every driver behind him was promoted one position. In the BoP adjustments, the Lamborghini Huracan GT3 Evo 2 received a decrease in minimum weight by 10 kg (22 lb) to 1,315 kg (2,899 lb) for improved handling and its Power Gain value was raised from 0.5% to 3.1% for improved performance. No other vehicle received a BoP adjustment.

=== Qualifying classification ===
Final qualifying classification
Pos.	Class	No.	Driver	Team	Manufacturer	Qualifying 1	Qualifying 2
1	P	50	Antonio Fuoco (ITA)	AF Corse SRL	Ferrari	2:16.111	2:15.535
2	G	83	Yifei Ye (CHN)	Harmony Racing	Ferrari	2:16.446	2:15.809
3	G	911	Alessio Picariello (BEL)	Tempo by Absolute Racing	Porsche	2:16.284	2:16.035
4	P	46	Joel Eriksson (SWE)	Audi Sport Asia Team Phantom	Audi	2:15.927	2:16.097
5	P	53	Raffaele Marciello (CHE)	Rowe Racing	BMW	2:16.270	2:16.106
6	P	11	Ayhancan Güven (TUR)	Schumacher CLRT	Porsche	2:16.385	2:16.262
7	G	22	Laurin Heinrich (DEU)	Schumacher CLRT	Porsche	2:16.498	2:16.317
8	G	19	Luca Engstler (DEU)	Absolute Racing	Lamborghini	2:16.950	2:16.543
9	P	45	Christopher Haase (DEU)	FAW Audi Sport Asia Team Phantom	Audi	2:16.772	2:16.966
10	P	63	Edoardo Mortara (CHE)	Absolute Racing	Lamborghini	2:16.621	2:17.983
11	P	992	Laurens Vanthoor (BEL)	Tempo by Absolute Racing	Porsche	2:17.015	—
12	G	5	Benjamin Goethe (DNK)	Optimum Motorsport	McLaren	2:17.213	—
13	S	36	Adderly Fong (HKG)	Uno Racing Team	Audi	2:17.514	—
14	G	23	Dorian Boccolacci (FRA)	Phantom Global Racing	Porsche	2:17.560	—
15	S	37	Deng Yi (CHN)	Winhere Motorsports	Ferrari	2:17.737	—
16	P	31	Sheldon van der Linde (ZAF)	Team WRT	BMW	No time	—

Categorisation
Icon	Class
P	Platinum
G	Gold
S	Silver

== Qualification race ==
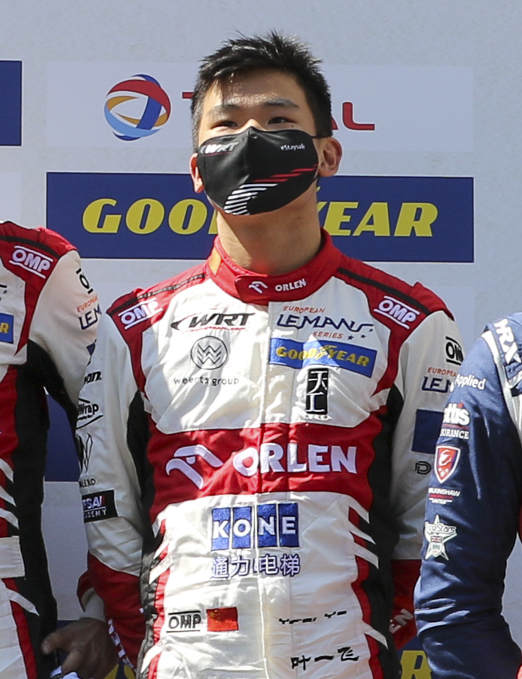
Yifei Ye (pictured in 2021) finished second in the qualification race.

The 12-lap qualification race to set the main race's starting order was held on 15 November, in dry weather conditions and an air temperature of 25 °C (77 °F) from 14:35 Macau Standard Time (UTC+08:00). On a new set of tyres to maximise his performance against his nearest competitors, Fuoco made a clean start to hold off Ye on a used set of tyres into Lisboa Bend turn, while Marciello made a quick getaway to pass Eriksson for fourth. On the approach to the right-hand Lisboa Bend turn on the outside, Ye then stopped Marciello's effort to pass him, but Picariello ran out of room in the turn, forcing Marciello to fall to fourth. Further down the field, multiple cars were involved in an incident. At Lisboa Bend corner, Haase collided with the tyre barrier, but he managed to extricate himself from the wall and continue driving. Mortara tried to catch up, but at the turn's braking point, he braked late and ran deep into the run-off area. Goethe and Van der Linde were forced onto the run-off area and spun at the corner. Despite the incidents, the race was not stopped and the safety car was not deployed. It turned out to be the qualifying race's sole significant incident.

At the front, Fuoco opened up a 3.6-second advantage over Ye within two laps. Picariello applied pressure to Ye, and the two were never separated by more than a second, despite Picariello's seeming inability to pass Ye. Maricello participated in the duel for second, but due to tyre wear, he dropped back after five laps. Fuoco led the entire qualification race and won to claim pole position for the following day's main race. This was Ferrari's maiden FIA GT World Cup win. Ye finished in second, 2.543 seconds behind. Picariello was quick in the mountain section and completed the podium finishers in third. After withdrawing from the battle with three laps left, Marciello was fourth, four seconds from the final podium place. Eriksson in fifth and Güven in sixth had largely quiet races. With several efforts to pass on the start/finish straight, Engstler, the highest-placed Lamborghini driver in seventh, withstood Heinrich's persistent pressure in eighth. Boccolacci was involved in the battle between Engstler and Heinrich but finished ninth. Yi completed the top ten finishers. Vanthoor in 11th and Fong in 12th were delayed by the first lap melee. Van der Linde, Goethe, Hasse and Mortara were the final finishers. All of the 16 starters completed the race.

After the qualification race, Fong and Goethe were issued ten-second time penalties for separate collisions during the race, dropping them to 14th and 16th places.

=== Qualification race classification ===
Final qualification race classification
Pos.	Class	No.	Driver	Team	Car	Laps	Time/Retired
1	P	50	Antonio Fuoco (ITA)	AF Corse SRL	Ferrari 296 GT3	12	27:29.598
2	G	83	Yifei Ye (CHN)	Harmony Racing	Ferrari 296 GT3	12	+2.543
3	G	911	Alessio Picariello (BEL)	Tempo by Absolute Racing	Porsche 911 GT3 R (992)	12	+3.198
4	P	53	Raffaele Marciello (CHE)	Rowe Racing	BMW M4 GT3 Evo	12	+7.372
5	P	46	Joel Eriksson (SWE)	Audi Sport Asia Team Phantom	Audi R8 LMS Evo II	12	+8.452
6	P	11	Ayhancan Güven (TUR)	Schumacher CLRT	Porsche 911 GT3 R (992)	12	+9.003
7	G	19	Luca Engstler (DEU)	Absolute Racing	Lamborghini Huracán GT3 Evo 2	12	+18.068
8	G	22	Laurin Heinrich (DEU)	Schumacher CLRT	Porsche 911 GT3 R (992)	12	+18.556
9	G	23	Dorian Boccolacci (FRA)	Phantom Global Racing	Porsche 911 GT3 R (992)	12	+19.304
10	S	37	Deng Yi (CHN)	Winhere Motorsports	Ferrari 296 GT3	12	+20.280
11	P	992	Laurens Vanthoor (BEL)	Tempo by Absolute Racing	Porsche 911 GT3 R (992)	12	+20.885
12	P	31	Sheldon van der Linde (ZAF)	Team WRT	BMW M4 GT3 Evo	12	+28.031
13	P	45	Christopher Haase (DEU)	FAW Audi Sport Asia Team Phantom	Audi R8 LMS Evo II	12	+35.478
14	S	36	Adderly Fong (HKG)	Uno Racing Team	Audi R8 LMS Evo II	12	+35.757^{1}
15	P	63	Edoardo Mortara (CHE)	Absolute Racing	Lamborghini Huracán GT3 Evo 2	12	+36.065
16	G	5	Benjamin Goethe (DNK)	Optimum Motorsport	McLaren 720S GT3 Evo	12	+44.836^{2}

Notes

- ^1 – Adderly Fong finished 12th, but received a ten-second time penalty for a collision with Benjamin Goethe.
- ^2 – Benjamin Goethe finished 14th, but received a ten-second time penalty for a collision with Christopher Haase.

== Main race ==
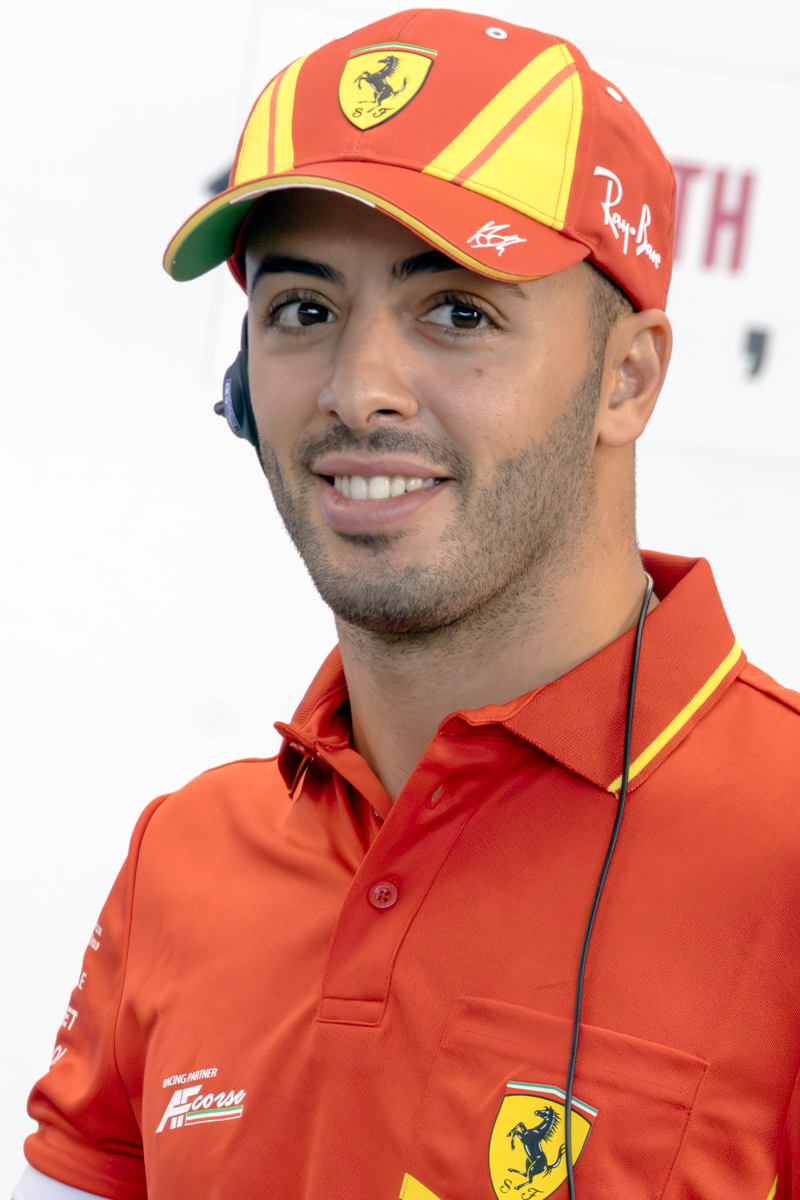
Antonio Fuoco (pictured in 2024) won both the qualification race and the main race to achieve his and Ferrari's first FIA GT World Cup win.

The 16-lap main race began in dry weather conditions of 24 °C (75 °F) at 12:35 local time on 16 November. Both Goethe's McLaren and Fong's Audi were repaired in time for the race. When the race began, Fuoco maintained the race lead heading towards Lisboa Bend corner. At the exit to Reservoir Bend turn, Picariello lost control of his Porsche after making slight contact with the left-rear of Marciello's BMW, which he had passed. Picariello hit the inside barrier and retired from the race. Ye momentarily slowed before Mandarin Bend turn, and Marciello slipstreamed past on the inside to take second place. Güven briefly ran in third, but Heinrich, his teammate, forced him into the Lisboa Bend turn tyre wall after locking his rear tyres while navigating the corner. This came after Heinrich was hit by Eriksson. As a result, Engstler and Boccolacci were unable to avoid Güven and struck the back of his car in a chain reaction crash. The trio retired from the race. The preceding two incidents promoted Heinrich to third while Ye dropped from second to fifth.

The safety car was deployed to allow for track clearing as Fong made a pit stop to repair a puncture he had incurred on the first lap after colliding with a struck car. When the race resumed on lap four, knowing that the BMW had a straightline speed advantage, Fuoco increased his pace to maintain the lead into Lisboa Bend corner. Vanthoor locked his tyres at Lisboa Bend turn after drawing alongside Yi in sixth and had to relinquish eighth to Van der Linde. He was then passed by Haase soon after and fell to ninth. Fuoco had built up a 1.8 second lead over Marciello by the conclusion of lap four, increasing his lead over Maricello to three seconds by lap eight as Maricello had understeer and no traction leaving the Melco hairpin despite running on a new set of tyres. Meanwhile, Van der Linde used an error by Yi at Mandarin Oriental Bend turn to move into sixth on lap six. On the following lap, Haase overtook Yi for seventh.

On lap 10, Mortara passed Goethe through Lisboa Bend corner for tenth place. The following lap, Mortara crashed into the outside tyre barrier at the Melco hairpin after his Lamborghini experienced an electrical outage while braking. Race control elected to employ localised yellow flags instead of deploying the safety car to retrieve the Lamborghini because the narrow hairpin prevented overtaking, notwithstanding Mortara's retirement from the race due to the collision. At the front, Fuoco maintained the lead he had held since the beginning of the race, securing both his and Ferrari's maiden FIA GT World Cup victory and their first GT win in Macau. Marciello was 3.960 seconds adrift in second. Because of his BMW's straightline speed, he was able to repel Heinrich's race-long pressure, preventing him from attacking into Lisboa Bend corner. Heinrich thus completed the podium finishers in third. Eriksson also pressured Maricello and was provisionally fourth. Ye did not battle for the top positions but recovered from his sub-par start to finish fifth. Van der Linde recovered to finish sixth, having started in 12th. Haase began in 13th and came in seventh. Yi was eighth, Vanthoor ninth and Goethe tenth. Fong was the final classified finisher.

=== Post-race ===
The stewards investigated the first lap collision between Eriksson and Heinrich. They held Eriksson "wholly responsible" for the collision based on CCTV and spectator footage and imposed a ten-second time penalty, dropping him to fifth and promoting Ye to fourth. Heinrich was not penalised by the stewards and kept his third-place result.

=== Main race classification ===
Final main race classification
Pos.	Class	No.	Driver	Team	Car	Laps	Time/Retired
1	P	50	Antonio Fuoco (ITA)	AF Corse SRL	Ferrari 296 GT3	16	40:19.865
2	P	53	Raffaele Marciello (CHE)	Rowe Racing	BMW M4 GT3 Evo	16	+3.960
3	G	22	Laurin Heinrich (DEU)	Schumacher CLRT	Porsche 911 GT3 R (992)	16	+4.609
4	G	83	Yifei Ye (CHN)	Harmony Racing	Ferrari 296 GT3	16	+5.545
5	P	46	Joel Eriksson (SWE)	Audi Sport Asia Team Phantom	Audi R8 LMS Evo II	16	+14.973^{3}
6	P	31	Sheldon van der Linde (ZAF)	Team WRT	BMW M4 GT3 Evo	16	+15.251
7	P	45	Christopher Haase (DEU)	FAW Audi Sport Asia Team Phantom	Audi R8 LMS Evo II	16	+15.815
8	S	37	Deng Yi (CHN)	Winhere Motorsports	Ferrari 296 GT3	16	+18.295
9	P	992	Laurens Vanthoor (BEL)	Tempo by Absolute Racing	Porsche 911 GT3 R (992)	16	+18.640
10	G	5	Benjamin Goethe (DNK)	Optimum Motorsport	McLaren 720S GT3 Evo	16	+25.312
11	S	36	Adderly Fong (HKG)	Uno Racing Team	Audi R8 LMS Evo II	16	+1:11.427
Ret	P	63	Edoardo Mortara (CHE)	Absolute Racing	Lamborghini Huracán GT3 Evo 2	10	Accident/Electrical
Ret	G	911	Alessio Picariello (BEL)	Tempo by Absolute Racing	Porsche 911 GT3 R (992)	0	Accident
Ret	P	11	Ayhancan Güven (TUR)	Schumacher CLRT	Porsche 911 GT3 R (992)	0	Accident
Ret	G	19	Luca Engstler (DEU)	Absolute Racing	Lamborghini Huracán GT3 Evo 2	0	Collision
Ret	G	23	Dorian Boccolacci (FRA)	Phantom Global Racing	Porsche 911 GT3 R (992)	0	Collision

Notes

- ^3 – Joel Eriksson finished fourth, but was penalised ten seconds for a collision with Laurin Heinrich.

== See also ==
- 2025 Macau Grand Prix
- 2025 Macau Guia Race
