= Tempo (handkerchief brand) =

German brand for paper handkerchiefs

Logo

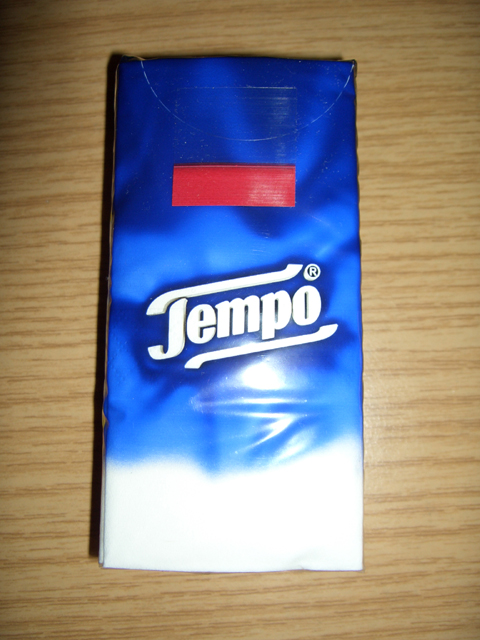
Package of handkerchiefs by Tempo (2006)

Tempo is the first German brand for paper handkerchiefs. Today, the brand belongs to Essity.

The brand name became independent in Germany in the course of time as a generic name and in colloquial language, paper handkerchiefs of other brands were often referred to as "Tempo handkerchief" or "Tempo" for short.

== History ==
The disposable paper handkerchief made of cellulose was the product idea of two German Jewish leading owners of Vereinigte Papierwerke AG, Oskar Rosenfelder (1878–1950) and his brother Emil Rosenfelder (1861–1945/1946). Oskar registered the Tempo brand on January 29, 1929 at the Reichspatentamt in Berlin. The Nazis forced the two to sell their firm.

In 1935, 150 million products were produced by Tempo. This number rose to 1 billion in 1955 and more than 4 billion in 1962.

In 2001, the brand was sold to SCA. Since a secession, Tempo has been part of Essity.

== Literature ==
- Eugen Roth: Das kleine Buch vom Taschentuch. Nuremberg 1954.
- VP-Schickedanz AG (publisher): Tempo, 50 Jahre, Dokumentation eines immer jungen Markenartikels. Nuremberg 1979.
- VP-Schickedanz AG (publisher): Tempo, 60 Jahre, Die Geschichte einer bahnbrechenden Idee. Nuremberg 1989.
