= Nicklas Nielsen =

Danish racing driver (born 1997)

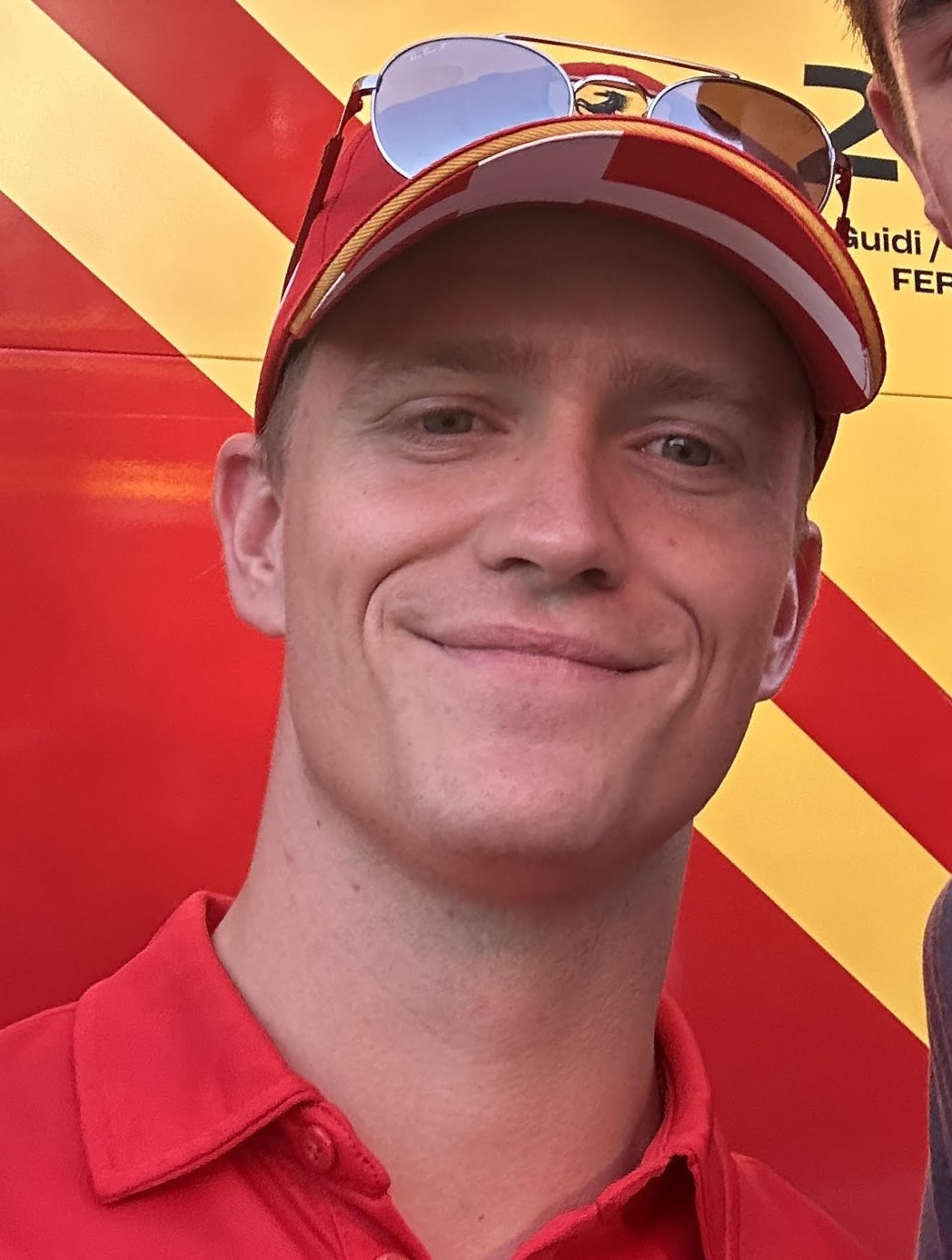
- Nielsen in 2023
- Nationality: (Denmark) Danish
- Born: Nicklas Ganshorn Nielsen; 6 February 1997 (age 29) Hørning, Denmark

FIA World Endurance Championship career
- Debut season: 2019–20
- Current team: Ferrari AF Corse
- Categorisation: FIA Silver (until 2019); FIA Gold (2020–2022); FIA Platinum (2023–)
- Car number: 50
- Wins: 7
- Podiums: 15
- Poles: 1
- Fastest laps: 3
- Best finish: 1st (Overall) in 2024

Championship titles
- 2021 2021 2019 2018: GTWC Europe Endurance Cup; FIA WEC - LMGTE Am; ELMS - LMGTE; Ferrari Challenge Europe

Nicklas Ganshorn "Nick" Nielsen (born 6 February 1997) is a Danish racing driver who competes in the FIA World Endurance Championship for Ferrari AF Corse, driving a Ferrari 499P in the Hypercar class. He won the 2024 24 Hours of Le Mans together with Antonio Fuoco and Miguel Molina, becoming the third Dane to win the contest.

== Early career ==
=== Karting ===
Nielsen began karting when he was four years old, back in 2001. He competed in many international events and championships, winning ten major titles.

=== Lower formula ===
In 2016, Nielsen made his single-seater debut in the ADAC Formula 4 Championship in Germany, finishing eighth and winning the Rookie's championship while racing for the Austrian Neuhauser Racing team, scoring three podiums and two fastest laps.

In 2017, Nielsen returned to the ADAC championship, this time with the US Racing team. Although he did win a race and scored three podiums, a team disqualification at the Lausitzring event and a major accident induced by a competitor which caused irreparable damage to his car for the rest of the event at the Nürburgring deprived him of a proper chance to fight for the title.

== Sportscar career ==
=== GT ===
At the end of 2017, not having the budget to continue in single-seater competitions, Nielsen was given a chance to race in the final round of the Ferrari Challenge Europe by gentleman driver and Formula Racing team owner Johnny Laursen, whose son Conrad Nielsen had coached in karting. Nielsen took the opportunity and won both races at Mugello, leading to him contesting the Ferrari Challenge season in 2018. There, Nielsen dominated, winning the title with Formula Racing after taking ten victories from fourteen races, never finishing off the podium. He also ended up taking home the Finali Mondiali trophy at Monza to conclude his season.

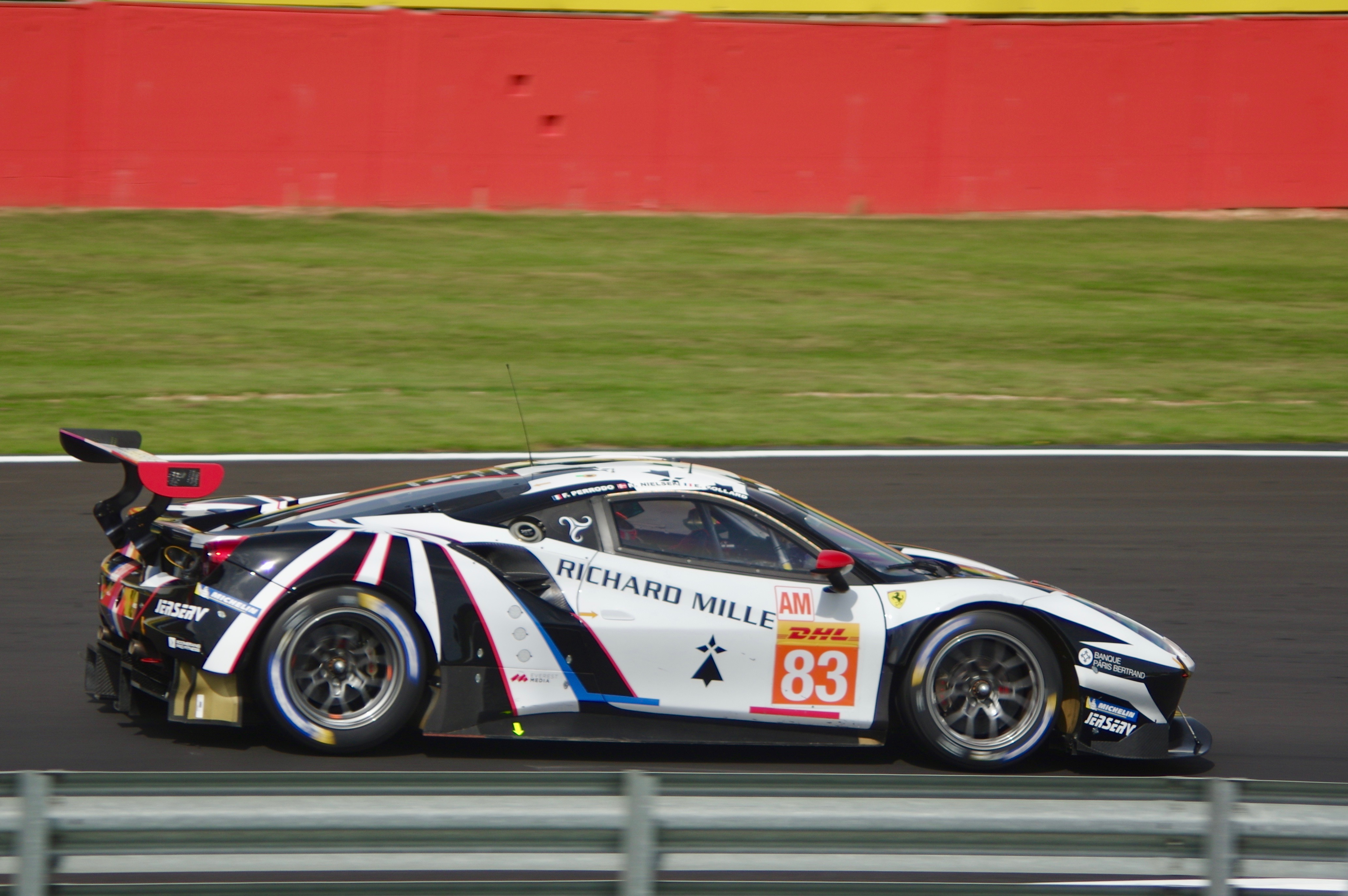
Nielsen at the 2019 4 Hours of Silverstone

In 2019, Nielsen stepped into the LMGTE category, driving for Luzich Racing in the European Le Mans Series and partaking in the 2019–20 FIA World Endurance Championship campaign at AF Corse. In the former championship, Nielsen would help Ferrari factory driver Alessandro Pier Guidi and amateur Fabien Lavergne to win four races, which allowed the trio to clinch the title with a race to spare. He was awarded the accolade of ELMS Rookie of the Year as a result. During the WEC campaign, one that Nielsen contested alongside François Perrodo and Emmanuel Collard, he finished third in class at the Le Mans 24 Hours, on his way to win the title with two victories and five podiums to their name.

Having been promoted to FIA Gold ranking ahead of 2021, Nielsen returned to the WEC's LMGTE Am class with AF Corse, partnering youngster Alessio Rovera and gentleman driver Perrodo. The trio dominated, winning early at Spa and then Monza, with Nielsen setting the fastest lap in both races. They subsequently performed well at Le Mans, winning the race in their class and putting themselves into a controlling championship lead. With another win at Bahrain, Nielsen and his teammates became champions, with the Dane and Perrodo defending their title. The same season also saw Nielsen triumph at the 24 Hours of Spa, in a performance which helped him, Alessandro Pier Guidi, and Côme Ledogar to take home the GT World Challenge Europe Endurance Cup championship.

=== Prototypes ===
For the 2022 season, Nielsen moved into prototype racing, competing in the LMP2 category of the WEC and ELMS respectively, remaining with AF Corse, Rovera, and Perrodo in the series's Pro-Am subclasses. Their campaign in the WEC proved to be successful, as four subclass wins, as well as a pole at Sebring scored by Nielsen, earned them the Pro-Am title. In the ELMS meanwhile, the Dane and his teammates lost out on the title to Racing Team Turkey, winning just one race in their class at Barcelona.

Nielsen was one of the six drivers chosen to debut for Ferrari in the burgeoning Hypercar category in 2023, driving its 499P No. 50 entry alongside Antonio Fuoco and Miguel Molina in the WEC. Though the team showed bursts of pace, as proven by Fuoco's two poles, they ended up third in the championship behind both Toyota entries, having scored podiums in four events. Nielsen, Fuoco, and Molina managed to beat their sister car in the standings, despite the latter winning the Centenary Le Mans, a race in which the No. 50's hopes of victory were dashed due to a radiator leak during the night. At the end of the season, Nielsen committed to Ferrari by signing a contract extension.

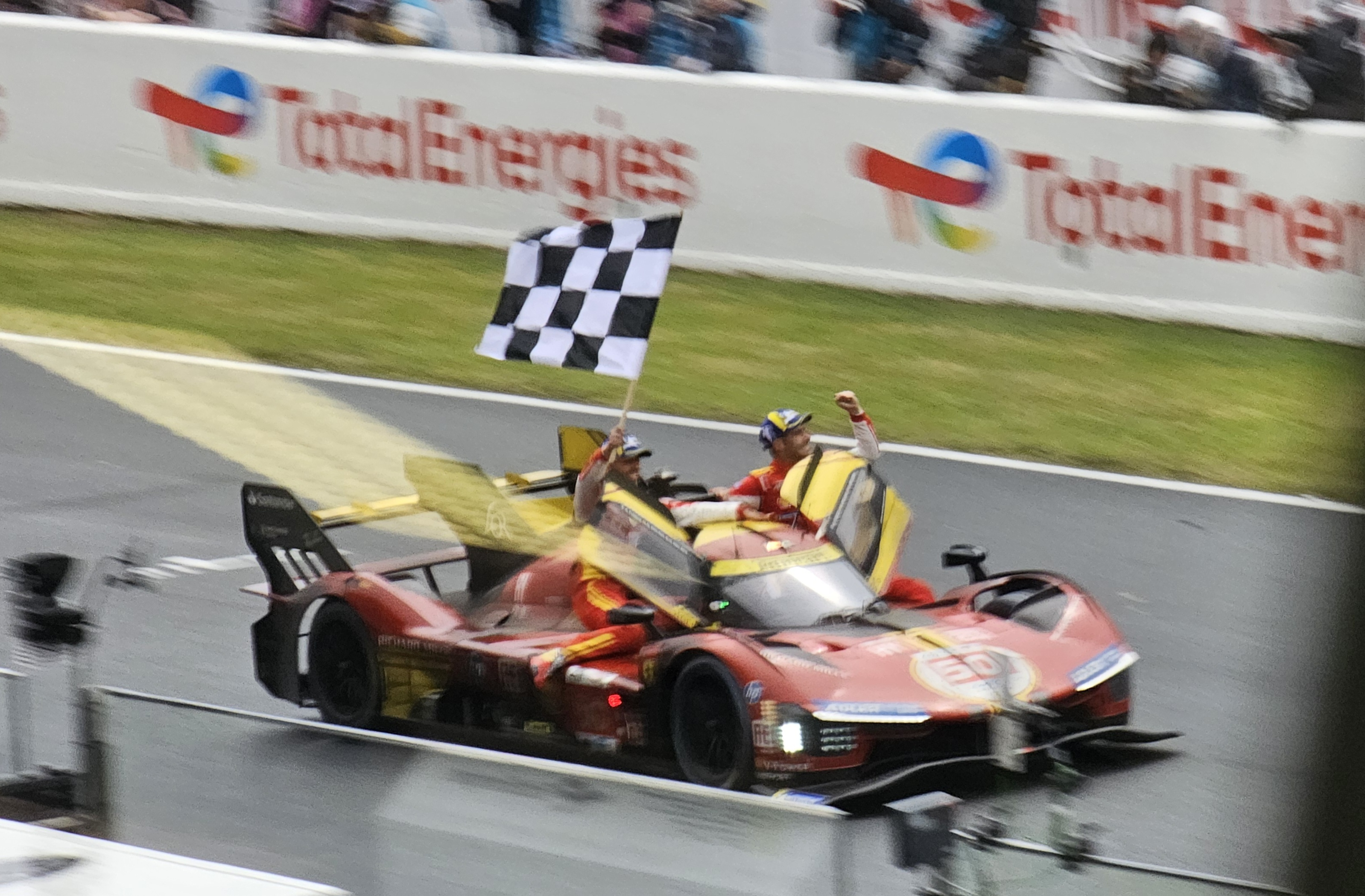
Nielsen, along with Fuoco and Molina celebrated their 2024 24 Hours of Le Mans victory, successfully defended Ferrari's crown from the previous year

In 2024, Nielsen remained with Ferrari in the WEC. The season began with points finishes in Qatar and Imola, though the team missed out on the win in the latter due to a strategic error in changing weather conditions. The podium came at Spa, where the #50 crew completed a comeback from being disqualified in qualifying to finish third in a red flag-interrupted event. Nielsen's highlight performance came at Le Mans: having already taken the lead once during the opening lap, Nielsen re-entered the car for the final stints on Sunday. A pit stop to fix the right-front door, which would not close, put the No. 50 entry onto an alternate strategy relative to its competitors, with Nielsen being tasked to save fuel to remain in the lead once his rivals had pitted. Having managed his car's so-called virtual energy tank during the final thirty minutes, Nielsen crossed the line in first place, earning him, Fuoco, and Molina their first ever overall victories at the Sarthe, as well as defending Ferrari's Le Mans crown from the previous year. At the 6 Hours of COTA, the No. 50 crew added another podium, with Nielsen working the middle stints before Fuoco brought the car home in third place.

In 2025, Nielsen retained his seat alongside Fuoco and Molina in the No. 50 Ferrari 499P, winning the season-opening Qatar 1812 km as part of a Ferrari 1-2-3 result. At the conclusion of the season, Ferrari secured both the Manufacturers' and Drivers' World Championships, with the championship-winning driver title going to the crew of the No. 51 sister car. Nielsen, Fuoco, and Molina finished third in the Hypercar Drivers' standings, completing an all-Ferrari top three. Separately, Nielsen was announced on a multi-year contract extension with Ferrari, with the marque's Global Head of Endurance Antonello Coletta stating that Nielsen had confirmed his "maturity as one of Ferrari's leading drivers."

== Racing record ==
=== Career summary ===
Season	Series	Team	Races	Wins	Poles	F/Laps	Podiums	Points	Position
2016	ADAC Formula 4 Championship	Neuhauser Racing	24	0	0	2	3	106	8th
2016	Audi Sport TT Cup	—N/a	14	1	1	1	7	238	**3rd**
2017	ADAC Formula 4 Championship	US Racing	19	1	1	1	4	128	6th
2017	Ferrari Challenge Europe – Trofeo Pirelli (Pro)	Formula Racing	2	2	2	1	2	34	8th
2018	Ferrari Challenge Europe – Trofeo Pirelli (Pro)	Formula Racing	14	10	8	10	14	282	**1st**
2018	Finali Mondiali – Trofeo Pirelli (Pro)	Formula Racing	1	1	0	0	1	N/A	**1st**
2018	FIA GT Nations Cup	Team Denmark	3	0	0	0	1	N/A	**3rd**
2018	International GT Open	Luzich Racing	2	0	0	0	0	6	31st
2019	European Le Mans Series - LMGTE	Luzich Racing	6	4	0	2	5	127	**1st**
2019–20	FIA World Endurance Championship - LMGTE Am	AF Corse	8	2	0	0	5	167	**1st**
2020	24 Hours of Le Mans - LMGTE Am	AF Corse	1	0	0	0	1	N/A	**3rd**
2020	GT World Challenge Europe Endurance Cup	AF Corse	3	0	0	0	0	46	6th
2020	Intercontinental GT Challenge	AF Corse	1	0	0	0	0	12	15th
2020	European Le Mans Series - LMGTE	Iron Lynx	1	0	0	0	0	10	16th
2020	Le Mans Cup - GT3	Iron Lynx	1	0	0	1	1	15	12th
2021	Asian Le Mans Series - GT	Formula Racing	4	0	0	0	1	23.5	9th
2021	FIA World Endurance Championship - LMGTE Am	AF Corse	6	4	0	3	4	150	**1st**
2021	24 Hours of Le Mans - LMGTE Am	AF Corse	1	1	0	0	1	N/A	**1st**
2021	IMSA SportsCar Championship - GTD	AF Corse	2	0	1	0	0	246	55th
2021	GT World Challenge Europe Endurance Cup	Iron Lynx	5	1	0	0	1	83	**1st**
2021	Intercontinental GT Challenge	Iron Lynx Motorsport Lab	1	1	0	0	1	37	6th
2021	Intercontinental GT Challenge	AF Corse - Francorchamps Motors	2	0	1	1	0	37	6th
2022	FIA World Endurance Championship - LMP2	AF Corse	6	0	1	0	0	12	18th
2022	European Le Mans Series - LMP2	AF Corse	6	0	1	0	0	25	12th
2022	IMSA SportsCar Championship - GTD	AF Corse	1	0	0	0	0	294	53rd
2022	24 Hours of Le Mans - LMP2	AF Corse	1	0	0	0	0	N/A	19th
2022	GT World Challenge Europe Endurance Cup	Iron Lynx	5	0	0	0	1	37	10th
2022	Intercontinental GT Challenge	Iron Lynx	1	0	0	0	0	26	10th
2022	Intercontinental GT Challenge	AF Corse - Francorchamps	1	0	0	0	1	26	10th
2023	Asian Le Mans Series - GT	Formula Racing	3	0	0	0	0	4	17th
2023	European Le Mans Series - GTE	Formula Racing	5	0	0	0	1	24	12th
2023	FIA World Endurance Championship - Hypercar	Ferrari AF Corse	7	0	0	0	4	120	**3rd**
2023	24 Hours of Le Mans - Hypercar	Ferrari AF Corse	1	0	0	0	0	N/A	5th
2023	GT World Challenge Europe Endurance Cup	AF Corse	5	1	1	0	1	36	8th
2023	IMSA SportsCar Championship - LMP2	AF Corse	2	0	0	0	1	250	29th
2024	FIA World Endurance Championship - Hypercar	Ferrari AF Corse	8	1	0	0	3	115	**2nd**
2024	24 Hours of Le Mans - Hypercar	Ferrari AF Corse	1	1	0	0	1	N/A	**1st**
2024	IMSA SportsCar Championship - LMP2	Richard Mille AF Corse	6	1	0	0	1	1620	13th
2024	European Le Mans Series - LMGT3	Formula Racing	5	1	0	0	2	44	10th
2025	FIA World Endurance Championship - Hypercar	Ferrari AF Corse	8	1	0	0	4	98	**3rd**
2025	IMSA SportsCar Championship - LMP2	AF Corse	4	0	0	0	0	1007	29th
2025	European Le Mans Series - LMP2 Pro-Am	AF Corse	1	0	0	0	0	4	15th
2026	IMSA SportsCar Championship - LMP2	AF Corse USA	1	0	0	0	0	199	42nd
2026	GT World Challenge America - Pro	AF Corse USA	1	0	1	1	1	0	NC†
2026	FIA World Endurance Championship - Hypercar	Ferrari AF Corse	8	1	1	0	3	72	9th
2026	GT World Challenge Europe Endurance Cup	AF Corse	4	0	1	1	1	16	14th
2026–27	Asian Le Mans Series - Hypercar	AF Corse							

=== Complete ADAC Formula 4 Championship results ===
(key) (Races in bold indicate pole position) (Races in italics indicate fastest lap)

Year	Team	1	2	3	4	5	6	7	8	9	10	11	12	13	14	15	16	17	18	19	20	21	22	23	24	Pos	Points
2016	Neuhauser Racing	OSC1; 1; 10	OSC1; 2; 9	OSC1; 3; 8	SAC; 1; 7	SAC; 2; 5	SAC; 3; 3	LAU; 1 Ret	LAU; 2; 15	LAU; 3; 17	OSC2; 1 Ret	OSC2; 2; 15	OSC2; 3; 25	RBR; 1; 5	RBR; 2; 3	RBR; 3; 4	NÜR; 1; 4	NÜR; 2; 3	NÜR; 3; 17	ZAN; 1; 16	ZAN; 2; 11	ZAN; 3; 15	HOC; 1; 16	HOC; 2; 27	HOC; 3; 8	8th	106
2017	US Racing	OSC1; 1; 2	**OSC1**; **2**; 1	OSC1; 3; 9	LAU; 1 DSQ	LAU; 2 DSQ	LAU; 3 DSQ	RBR; 1; 3	RBR; 2; 8	RBR; 3; 2	OSC2; 1; 15	OSC2; 2; 5	OSC2; 3; 12	NÜR; 1 Ret	NÜR; 2 DNS	NÜR; 3 DNS	SAC; 1; 4	SAC; 2; 4	SAC; 3; 9	HOC; 1; 5	HOC; 2 Ret	HOC; 3 Ret				6th	128

=== Complete Ferrari Challenge results ===
==== Complete Ferrari Challenge Europe results ====
(Races in bold indicate pole position; results in italics indicate fastest lap)

Year	Team	Class	1	2	3	4	5	6	7	8	9	10	11	12	13	14	Rank	Points
2017	Formula Racing	Pro	VAL; 1	VAL; 2	MNZ; 1	MNZ; 2	HUN; 1	HUN; 2	LEC; 1	LEC; 2	SIL; 1	SIL; 2	IMO; 1	IMO; 2	**MUG**; **1**; 1	**MUG**; **2**; 1	8th	34
2018	Formula Racing	Pro	**MUG**; **1**; 1	**MUG**; **2**; 1	SIL; 1; 2	SIL; 2; 1	**SPA**; **1**; 3	SPA; 2; 1	**MIS**; **1**; 1	MIS; 2; 2	**BRN**; **1**; 1	**BRN**; **2**; 1	**BAR**; **1**; 1	**BAR**; **2**; 1	MNZ; 1; 1	MNZ; 2; 2	1st	282

==== Ferrari Challenge Finali Mondiali results ====
Year	Class	Team	Car	Circuit	Pos.
2018	**Trofeo Pirelli Pro**	(Denmark) Formula Racing	Ferrari 488 Challenge	(Italy) Autodromo Nazionale di Monza	**1st**

=== Complete European Le Mans Series results ===
(Races in bold indicate pole position; results in italics indicate fastest lap)

Year	Entrant	Class	Chassis	Engine	1	2	3	4	5	6	Rank	Points
2019	Luzich Racing	LMGTE	Ferrari 488 GTE	Ferrari F154CB 3.9 L Turbo V8	LEC; 1	MNZ; 3					1st	127
2019	Luzich Racing	LMGTE	Ferrari 488 GTE Evo	Ferrari F154CB 3.9 L Turbo V8			CAT; 1	SIL; 4	SPA; 1	ALG; 1	1st	127
2020	Iron Lynx	LMGTE	Ferrari 488 GTE Evo	Ferrari F154CB 3.9 L Turbo V8	LEC	SPA	LEC; 5	MNZ	ALG		16th	10
2022	AF Corse	LMP2	Oreca 07	Gibson GK428 4.2 L V8	LEC; 8	**IMO**; 14	MNZ; 12	CAT; 5	SPA; 7	ALG; 8	12th	25
2022	AF Corse	Pro-Am Cup	Oreca 07	Gibson GK428 4.2 L V8	2	5	4	1	2	2	3rd	101
2023	Formula Racing	LMGTE	Ferrari 488 GTE Evo	Ferrari F154CB 3.9 L Turbo V8	CAT	LEC; 8	ARA; Ret	SPA; 2	PRT; 12	ALG; 9	12th	24
2024	Formula Racing	LMGT3	Ferrari 296 GT3	Ferrari F163CE 3.0 L Turbo V6	CAT; 1	LEC; 9	IMO; 9	SPA; Ret	MUG; 3	ALG	10th	44
2025	AF Corse	LMP2 Pro-Am	Oreca 07	Gibson GK428 4.2 L V8	CAT	LEC; 8	IMO	SPA	MUG	ALG	15th	4

=== Complete FIA World Endurance Championship results ===
(key) (Races in bold indicate pole position; results in italics indicate fastest lap)

Year	Entrant	Class	Car	Engine	1	2	3	4	5	6	7	8	Rank	Points
2019–20	AF Corse	LMGTE Am	Ferrari 488 GTE Evo	Ferrari F154CB 3.9 L Turbo V8	SIL; 1	FUJ; 2	SHA; 4	BHR; 4	COA; 4	SPA; 1	LMS; 3	BHR; 2	1st	167
2021	AF Corse	LMGTE Am	Ferrari 488 GTE Evo	Ferrari F154CB 3.9 L Turbo V8	SPA; 1	POR; 11	MON; 1	LMS; 1	BHR; 5	BHR; 1			1st	150
2022	AF Corse	LMP2	Oreca 07	Gibson GK428 4.2 L V8	**SEB**; 9	SPA; 9	LMS; 11	MNZ; 9	FUJ; 10	BHR; 10			18th	12
2022	AF Corse	Pro-Am Cup	Oreca 07	Gibson GK428 4.2 L V8	1	1	2	3	1	1			1st	177
2023	Ferrari AF Corse	Hypercar	Ferrari 499P	Ferrari 3.0 L Turbo V6	**SEB**; 3	ALG; 2	SPA; Ret	**LMS**; 4	MNZ; 2	FUJ; 4	BHR; 3		3rd	120
2024	Ferrari AF Corse	Hypercar	Ferrari 499P	Ferrari 3.0 L Turbo V6	QAT; 6	**ITA**; 4	SPA; 3	LMS; 1	SÃO; 6	COA; 3	FUJ; 9	BHR; 11	2nd	115
2025	Ferrari AF Corse	Hypercar	Ferrari 499P	Ferrari 3.0 L Turbo V6	QAT; 1	IMO; 15	**SPA**; 2	LMS; DSQ	SÃO; 12	COA; 2	FUJ; 11	BHR; 3	3rd	98
2026	Ferrari AF Corse	Hypercar	Ferrari 499P	Ferrari F163 3.0 L Turbo V6	IMO; 6	SPA; 3	LMS; Ret	SÃO; 7	COA; 1	FUJ; Ret	CAT; 3	**MNZ**; 9	9th	72

^{*} Season still in progress.

=== Complete 24 Hours of Le Mans results ===
Year	Team	Co-Drivers	Car	Class	Laps	Pos.	Class Pos.
2020	(Italy) AF Corse	(France) François Perrodo (France) Emmanuel Collard	Ferrari 488 GTE Evo	GTE; Am	339	26th	**3rd**
2021	(Italy) AF Corse	(France) François Perrodo (Italy) Alessio Rovera	Ferrari 488 GTE Evo	GTE; Am	340	25th	**1st**
2022	(Italy) AF Corse	(France) François Perrodo (Italy) Alessio Rovera	Oreca 07-Gibson	LMP2	361	24th	19th
2023	(Italy) Ferrari AF Corse	(Italy) Antonio Fuoco (Spain) Miguel Molina	Ferrari 499P	Hypercar	337	5th	5th
2024	(Italy) Ferrari AF Corse	(Italy) Antonio Fuoco (Spain) Miguel Molina	Ferrari 499P	Hypercar	311	**1st**	**1st**
2025	(Italy) Ferrari AF Corse	(Italy) Antonio Fuoco (Spain) Miguel Molina	Ferrari 499P	Hypercar	387	DSQ	DSQ
2026	(Italy) Ferrari AF Corse	(Italy) Antonio Fuoco (Spain) Miguel Molina	Ferrari 499P	Hypercar	284	DNF	DNF

=== Complete GT World Challenge Europe results ===
==== GT World Challenge Europe Endurance Cup ====
(key) (Races in bold indicate pole position; results in italics indicate fastest lap)

Year	Team	Car	Class	1	2	3	4	5	6	7	Pos.	Points
2020	AF Corse	Ferrari 488 GT3	Pro	IMO; 7	NÜR; Ret	SPA; 6H; 4	SPA; 12H; 1	SPA; 24H; 5	LEC		6th	46
2021	Iron Lynx	Ferrari 488 GT3 Evo 2020	Pro	MNZ; 5	LEC; 5	SPA; 6H; 1	SPA; 12H; 1	SPA; 24H; 1	NÜR; 7	CAT; 7	1st	83
2022	Iron Lynx	Ferrari 488 GT3 Evo 2020	Pro	IMO; 7	LEC; 2	SPA; 6H; 5	SPA; 12H; 11	SPA; 24H; 9	HOC; 43†	CAT; 20	10th	37
2023	AF Corse - Francorchamps Motors	Ferrari 296 GT3	Pro	MNZ; 8	LEC; 7	SPA; 6H; 29	SPA; 12H; 25	SPA; 24H; 44†	NÜR; 22	**CAT**; 1	8th	36
2026	AF Corse	Ferrari 296 GT3 Evo	Pro	LEC; 14	MNZ; Ret	SPA; 6H; 35	SPA; 12H; 23	**SPA**; **24H**; 3	NÜR; 29	ALG	14th	16

=== Complete IMSA SportsCar Championship results ===
(key) (Races in bold indicate pole position; results in italics indicate fastest lap)

Year	Team	Class	Make	Engine	1	2	3	4	5	6	7	8	9	10	11	12	Pos.	Points	Ref
2021	AF Corse	GTD	Ferrari 488 GT3 Evo 2020	Ferrari F154CB 3.9 L Turbo V8	DAY; 8	SEB	MDO	DET	WGL	WGL	LIM	ELK	LGA	LBH	VIR	PET	55th	246	
2022	AF Corse	GTD	Ferrari 488 GT3 Evo 2020	Ferrari F154CB 3.9 L Turbo V8	DAY; 4	SEB	LBH	LGA	MDO	DET	WGL	MOS	LIM	ELK	VIR	PET	53rd	294	
2023	AF Corse	LMP2	Oreca 07	Gibson GK428 4.2 L V8	DAY; 3	SEB	LGA	WGL; 6	ELK	IMS	PET						29th	250	
2024	Richard Mille AF Corse	LMP2	Oreca 07	Gibson GK428 4.2 L V8	DAY; 12	SEB; 13	WGL; 1	MOS	ELK; 5	IMS; 6	PET; 6						13th	1620	
2025	AF Corse	LMP2	Oreca 07	Gibson GK428 4.2 L V8	DAY; 7	SEB; 10	WGL	MOS	ELK	IMS; 11	PET; 5						29th	1007	
2026	AF Corse USA	LMP2	Oreca 07	Gibson GK428 4.2 L V8	DAY; 13	SEB	WGL	MOS	ELK	IMS	PET						42nd	199	

=== Complete Asian Le Mans Series results ===
(key) (Races in bold indicate pole position; results in italics indicate fastest lap)

Year	Team	Class	Car	Engine	1	2	3	4	5	6	Pos.	Points
2021	Formula Racing	GT	Ferrari 488 GT3	Ferrari F154CB 3.9 L Turbo V8	DUB; 1; 6	DUB; 2; 16	ABU; 1; 3	ABU; 2 Ret			9th	23.5
2023	Formula Racing	GT	Ferrari 488 GT3 Evo 2020	Ferrari F154CB 3.9 L Turbo V8	DUB; 1; 8	DUB; 2 Ret	ABU; 1 Ret	ABU; 2 WD			17th	4
2026–27	AF Corse	Hypercar	Ferrari 499P	Ferrari F163CG 3.0 L Turbo V6	LEC; 1; 1	**LEC**; **2**; 1	JER; 1	JER; 2	ALG; 1	ALG; 2	1st*	51*

Sporting positions
Preceded by Jörg Bergmeister; Patrick Lindsey; Egidio Perfetti	FIA Endurance Trophy for LMGTE Am Drivers; 2019–20; With: Emmanuel Collard & François Perrodo	Succeeded by Incumbent
