= 2025 Qatar 1812 km =

Endurance sportscar racing event

2025 Qatar Airways Qatar 1812 km
Event information
- Round 1 of 8 in the 2025 FIA World Endurance Championship
- Date: 28 February 2025
- Location: Lusail
- Venue: Losail International Circuit
- Duration: 10 hours

Results
- Laps completed: 318
- Distance (km): 1722.644
- Distance (miles): 1070.401
- Hypercar

Pole position
- Time: 1:38.359
- Team: (Italy) Ferrari AF Corse
- Drivers: (Italy) Antonio Giovinazzi

Winners
- Team: (Italy) Ferrari AF Corse
- Drivers: (Italy) Antonio Fuoco (Spain) Miguel Molina (Denmark) Nicklas Nielsen
- LMGT3

Winners
- Team: (United Kingdom) TF Sport
- Drivers: (United Kingdom) Jonny Edgar (Spain) Daniel Juncadella (United States) Ben Keating

The 2025 Qatar 1812 km (formally known as the 2025 Qatar Airways Qatar 1812 km) was an endurance sportscar racing event held between 26 and 28 February 2025, as the first of eight rounds of the 2025 FIA World Endurance Championship. It was the second consecutive running of the event.

== Background ==
The event was announced on 9 June 2023, during the 2023 24 Hours of Le Mans weekend. The race was scheduled to cover 1,812 kilometres (1,126 mi) or, if this distance was not achieved, last for a maximum of 10 hours. The figure 1812 references the country's national day. On 14 June 2024, the 2025 season calendar was published, with Qatar once again serving as the championship opener.

== Entry list ==
The entry list was published on 12 February 2025 and consisted of 36 entries across 2 categories – 18 in both Hypercar and LMGT3. In the Hypercar category, Isotta Fraschini was dropped from the full-season entry list after completing only five rounds in the 2024 season, and Lamborghini also exited the series. In return, Aston Martin entered the competition with the Valkyrie, while Jota Sport moved from a Porsche customer team to running the Cadillac-backed factory effort, fielding two Cadillac V-Series.Rs.

In the LMGT3 category, D'station Racing exited the series and was replaced by Racing Spirit of Léman as the second Aston Martin entrant. Following Lamborghini's full withdrawal from the WEC, Mercedes-AMG will make its series debut, with Iron Lynx fielding two cars. Pure Rxcing will not defend its title, with Iron Dames taking over the second Porsche entry.

== Schedule ==
Date	Time (local: AST)	Event
Wednesday, 26 February	11:30	Free Practice 1
Wednesday, 26 February	16:50	Free Practice 2
Thursday, 27 February	12:00	Free Practice 3
Thursday, 27 February	17:00	Qualifying - LMGT3
Thursday, 27 February	17:20	Hyperpole - LMGT3
Thursday, 27 February	17:40	Qualifying - Hypercar
Thursday, 27 February	18:00	Hyperpole - Hypercar
Friday, 28 February	14:00	Race

== Practice ==
Three practice sessions are scheduled to be held before the event: two on Wednesday, and one on Thursday. The sessions on Wednesday morning and Wednesday afternoon lasted 90 minutes, and the session on Thursday morning lasted 60 minutes.

=== Practice 1 ===
The first practice session started at 11:30 AST on Wednesday. Hypercar was topped by James Calado in the No. 51 Ferrari AF Corse entry, with a lap time of 1:42.123. He was 0.232 seconds quicker than second-placed Sébastien Bourdais in the No. 38 Cadillac Hertz Team Jota entry, with Miguel Molina in third in the sister No. 50 Ferrari, 0.253 seconds behind Calado. Ben Barnicoat topped the session in the LMGT3 class, lapping the circuit in 1 minute, 55.623 seconds in the No. 78 Akkodis ASP Team entry. His lap was 0.113 seconds quicker than that of second-placed Daniel Juncadella in the No. 33 TF Sport entry, with Charlie Eastwood in the No. 81 TF Sport entry finishing third, 0.197 seconds behind Barnicoat. The session saw one stoppage, after the No. 009 Aston Martin THOR Team entry stopped on track, with the car unable to restart.

Class	No.	Entrant	Driver	Time
Hypercar	51	(Italy) Ferrari AF Corse	(United Kingdom) James Calado	1:42.123
LMGT3	78	(France) Akkodis ASP Team	(United Kingdom) Ben Barnicoat	1:55.623

- Note: Only the fastest car in each class is shown.

=== Practice 2 ===
The second practice session started at 16:50 AST on Wednesday, and saw Alex Lynn topping the timesheets in the Hypercar category in the No. 12 Cadillac, with a lap time of 1:39.601. His lap was 0.305 seconds quicker than that of Antonio Fuoco in the No. 50 Ferrari, with Robin Frijns setting the third-fastest lap, 0.475 seconds behind Lynn. The LMGT3 category was topped by Sean Gelael in the No. 95 United Autosports entry, lapping the circuit in 1 minute, 54.557 seconds. His lap was 0.136 seconds quicker than that of Barnicoat in the No. 78 Lexus, with the No. 87 Lexus of José María López finishing in third, 0.185 seconds behind.

Class	No.	Entrant	Driver	Time
Hypercar	12	(United States) Cadillac Hertz Team Jota	(United Kingdom) Alex Lynn	1:39.601
LMGT3	95	(United Kingdom) United Autosports	(Indonesia) Sean Gelael	1:54.557

- Note: Only the fastest car in each class is shown.

=== Practice 3 ===
The third and final practice session started 12:00 AST on Thursday. Fuoco led the session in the Hypercar class in the No. 50 Ferrari, lapping the circuit in 1:39.484. He was 0.081 seconds quicker than second-placed Antonio Giovinazzi in the No. 51 Ferrari, with Robert Kubica making it a Ferrari 1–2–3, finishing in third, 0.406 seconds behind Fuoco. The LMGT3 class saw Gelael top the session in the No. 95 McLaren, with a fastest lap of 1 minute, 54.569 seconds. Finn Gehrsitz was second in the No. 78 Lexus, 0.092 seconds behind. Grégoire Saucy finished third in the No. 59 McLaren, 0.169 seconds behind Gelael.

Class	No.	Entrant	Driver	Time
Hypercar	50	(Italy) Ferrari AF Corse	(Italy) Antonio Fuoco	1:39.484
LMGT3	95	(United Kingdom) United Autosports	(Indonesia) Sean Gelael	1:54.569

- Note: Only the fastest car in each class is shown.

== Qualifying ==
=== Qualifying results ===
Pole position winners in each class are marked in bold.

Pos	Class	No.	Entrant	Qualifying	Hyperpole	Grid
1	**Hypercar**	**51**	**(Italy) Ferrari AF Corse**	**1:38.587**	**1:38.359**	1
2	Hypercar	15	(Germany) BMW M Team WRT	1:39.316	1:38.495	2
3	Hypercar	50	(Italy) Ferrari AF Corse	1:38.609	1:38.692	3
4	Hypercar	12	(United States) Cadillac Hertz Team Jota	1:39.115	1:38.723	4
5	Hypercar	38	(United States) Cadillac Hertz Team Jota	1:39.616	1:39.036	5
6	Hypercar	20	(Germany) BMW M Team WRT	1:39.236	1:39.146	6
7	Hypercar	7	(Japan) Toyota Gazoo Racing	1:39.720	1:39.279	7
8	Hypercar	83	(Italy) AF Corse	1:39.326	1:39.299	8
9	Hypercar	35	(France) Alpine Endurance Team	1:39.629	1:39.506	9
10	Hypercar	93	(France) Peugeot TotalEnergies	1:39.926	1:39.674	10
11	Hypercar	5	(Germany) Porsche Penske Motorsport	1:39.946		11
12	Hypercar	94	(France) Peugeot TotalEnergies	1:40.032		12
13	Hypercar	6	(Germany) Porsche Penske Motorsport	1:40.363		13
14	Hypercar	36	(France) Alpine Endurance Team	1:40.364		14
15	Hypercar	99	(Germany) Proton Competition	1:41.421		15
16	Hypercar	007	(United Kingdom) Aston Martin THOR Team	1:41.766		16
17	Hypercar	8	(Japan) Toyota Gazoo Racing	1:46.289		17
18	Hypercar	009	(United Kingdom) Aston Martin THOR Team	No time		18
19	**LMGT3**	**95**	**(United Kingdom) United Autosports**	**1:54.851**	**1:54.239**	19
20	LMGT3	59	(United Kingdom) United Autosports	1:55.248	1:54.478	20
21	LMGT3	78	(France) Akkodis ASP Team	1:54.924	1:54.484	21
22	LMGT3	54	(Italy) Vista AF Corse	1:56.180	1:54.594	22
23	LMGT3	21	(Italy) Vista AF Corse	1:55.482	1:54.609	23
24	LMGT3	87	(France) Akkodis ASP Team	1:55.477	1:54.658	24
25	LMGT3	27	(United States) Heart of Racing Team	1:56.071	1:54.755	25
26	LMGT3	46	(Belgium) Team WRT	1:55.949	1:54.989	26
27	LMGT3	81	(United Kingdom) TF Sport	1:56.248	1:55.424	27
28	LMGT3	88	(Germany) Proton Competition	1:56.368	1:55.432	28
29	LMGT3	92	(Germany) Manthey 1st Phorm	1:56.434		29
30	LMGT3	10	(France) Racing Spirit of Léman	1:56.618		30
31	LMGT3	33	(United Kingdom) TF Sport	1:56.699		31
32	LMGT3	31	(Belgium) The Bend Team WRT	1:56.869		32
33	LMGT3	85	(Italy) Iron Dames	1:57.156		33
34	LMGT3	77	(Germany) Proton Competition	1:57.274		34
35	LMGT3	61	(Italy) Iron Lynx	1:58.554		35
36	LMGT3	60	(Italy) Iron Lynx	1:59.194		36

== Race ==
=== Race results ===
The minimum number of laps for classification (70% of overall winning car's distance) was 222 laps. Class winners are in bold and ‡.

Pos	Class	No	Team	Drivers	Chassis	Tyre	Laps	Time/Retired
Pos	Class	No	Team	Drivers	Engine	Tyre	Laps	Time/Retired
1	**Hypercar**	**50**	**(Italy) Ferrari AF Corse**	**(Italy) Antonio Fuoco (Spain) Miguel Molina (Denmark) Nicklas Nielsen**	**Ferrari 499P**	M	**318**	**10:01:39.098‡**
1	**Hypercar**	**50**	**(Italy) Ferrari AF Corse**	**(Italy) Antonio Fuoco (Spain) Miguel Molina (Denmark) Nicklas Nielsen**	**Ferrari F163 3.0 L Turbo V6**	M	**318**	**10:01:39.098‡**
2	Hypercar	83	(Italy) AF Corse	(United Kingdom) Phil Hanson (Poland) Robert Kubica (China) Yifei Ye	Ferrari 499P	M	318	+2.348
2	Hypercar	83	(Italy) AF Corse	(United Kingdom) Phil Hanson (Poland) Robert Kubica (China) Yifei Ye	Ferrari F163 3.0 L Turbo V6	M	318	+2.348
3	Hypercar	51	(Italy) Ferrari AF Corse	(United Kingdom) James Calado (Italy) Antonio Giovinazzi (Italy) Alessandro Pier Guidi	Ferrari 499P	M	318	+2.677
3	Hypercar	51	(Italy) Ferrari AF Corse	(United Kingdom) James Calado (Italy) Antonio Giovinazzi (Italy) Alessandro Pier Guidi	Ferrari F163 3.0 L Turbo V6	M	318	+2.677
4	Hypercar	15	(Germany) BMW M Team WRT	(Denmark) Kevin Magnussen (Switzerland) Raffaele Marciello (Belgium) Dries Vanthoor	BMW M Hybrid V8	M	318	+9.907
4	Hypercar	15	(Germany) BMW M Team WRT	(Denmark) Kevin Magnussen (Switzerland) Raffaele Marciello (Belgium) Dries Vanthoor	BMW P66/3 4.0 L Turbo V8	M	318	+9.907
5	Hypercar	8	(Japan) Toyota Gazoo Racing	(Switzerland) Sébastien Buemi (New Zealand) Brendon Hartley (Japan) Ryō Hirakawa	Toyota GR010 Hybrid	M	318	+19.628
5	Hypercar	8	(Japan) Toyota Gazoo Racing	(Switzerland) Sébastien Buemi (New Zealand) Brendon Hartley (Japan) Ryō Hirakawa	Toyota H8909 3.5 L Turbo V6	M	318	+19.628
6	Hypercar	7	(Japan) Toyota Gazoo Racing	(United Kingdom) Mike Conway (Japan) Kamui Kobayashi (Netherlands) Nyck de Vries	Toyota GR010 Hybrid	M	318	+23.266
6	Hypercar	7	(Japan) Toyota Gazoo Racing	(United Kingdom) Mike Conway (Japan) Kamui Kobayashi (Netherlands) Nyck de Vries	Toyota H8909 3.5 L Turbo V6	M	318	+23.266
7	Hypercar	20	(Germany) BMW M Team WRT	(Netherlands) Robin Frijns (Germany) René Rast (South Africa) Sheldon van der Linde	BMW M Hybrid V8	M	318	+36.388
7	Hypercar	20	(Germany) BMW M Team WRT	(Netherlands) Robin Frijns (Germany) René Rast (South Africa) Sheldon van der Linde	BMW P66/3 4.0 L Turbo V8	M	318	+36.388
8	Hypercar	12	(United States) Cadillac Hertz Team Jota	(United Kingdom) Alex Lynn (France) Norman Nato (United Kingdom) Will Stevens	Cadillac V-Series.R	M	318	+37.756
8	Hypercar	12	(United States) Cadillac Hertz Team Jota	(United Kingdom) Alex Lynn (France) Norman Nato (United Kingdom) Will Stevens	Cadillac LMC55R 5.5 L V8	M	318	+37.756
9	Hypercar	93	(France) Peugeot TotalEnergies	(Denmark) Mikkel Jensen (United Kingdom) Paul di Resta (France) Jean-Éric Vergne	Peugeot 9X8	M	318	+1:29.683
9	Hypercar	93	(France) Peugeot TotalEnergies	(Denmark) Mikkel Jensen (United Kingdom) Paul di Resta (France) Jean-Éric Vergne	Peugeot X6H 2.6 L Turbo V6	M	318	+1:29.683
10	Hypercar	5	(Germany) Porsche Penske Motorsport	(France) Julien Andlauer (Denmark) Michael Christensen (France) Mathieu Jaminet	Porsche 963	M	317	+1 Lap
10	Hypercar	5	(Germany) Porsche Penske Motorsport	(France) Julien Andlauer (Denmark) Michael Christensen (France) Mathieu Jaminet	Porsche 9RD 4.6 L Turbo V8	M	317	+1 Lap
11	Hypercar	6	(Germany) Porsche Penske Motorsport	(Australia) Matt Campbell (France) Kévin Estre (Belgium) Laurens Vanthoor	Porsche 963	M	317	+1 Lap
11	Hypercar	6	(Germany) Porsche Penske Motorsport	(Australia) Matt Campbell (France) Kévin Estre (Belgium) Laurens Vanthoor	Porsche 9RD 4.6 L Turbo V8	M	317	+1 Lap
12	Hypercar	94	(France) Peugeot TotalEnergies	(France) Loïc Duval (Denmark) Malthe Jakobsen (Belgium) Stoffel Vandoorne	Peugeot 9X8	M	317	+1 Lap
12	Hypercar	94	(France) Peugeot TotalEnergies	(France) Loïc Duval (Denmark) Malthe Jakobsen (Belgium) Stoffel Vandoorne	Peugeot X6H 2.6 L Turbo V6	M	317	+1 Lap
13	Hypercar	36	(France) Alpine Endurance Team	(France) Jules Gounon (France) Frédéric Makowiecki (Germany) Mick Schumacher	Alpine A424	M	317	+1 Lap
13	Hypercar	36	(France) Alpine Endurance Team	(France) Jules Gounon (France) Frédéric Makowiecki (Germany) Mick Schumacher	Alpine V634 3.4 L Turbo V6	M	317	+1 Lap
14	Hypercar	35	(France) Alpine Endurance Team	(France) Paul-Loup Chatin (Austria) Ferdinand Habsburg (France) Charles Milesi	Alpine A424	M	317	+1 Lap
14	Hypercar	35	(France) Alpine Endurance Team	(France) Paul-Loup Chatin (Austria) Ferdinand Habsburg (France) Charles Milesi	Alpine V634 3.4 L Turbo V6	M	317	+1 Lap
15	Hypercar	99	(Germany) Proton Competition	(Switzerland) Neel Jani (Chile) Nico Pino (Argentina) Nicolás Varrone	Porsche 963	M	314	+4 Laps
15	Hypercar	99	(Germany) Proton Competition	(Switzerland) Neel Jani (Chile) Nico Pino (Argentina) Nicolás Varrone	Porsche 9RD 4.6 L Turbo V8	M	314	+4 Laps
16	Hypercar	38	(United States) Cadillac Hertz Team Jota	(New Zealand) Earl Bamber (France) Sébastien Bourdais (United Kingdom) Jenson Button	Cadillac V-Series.R	M	307	+11 Laps
16	Hypercar	38	(United States) Cadillac Hertz Team Jota	(New Zealand) Earl Bamber (France) Sébastien Bourdais (United Kingdom) Jenson Button	Cadillac LMC55R 5.5 L V8	M	307	+11 Laps
17	Hypercar	009	(United Kingdom) Aston Martin THOR Team	(Canada) Roman De Angelis (Spain) Alex Riberas (Denmark) Marco Sørensen	Aston Martin Valkyrie	M	295	+23 Laps
17	Hypercar	009	(United Kingdom) Aston Martin THOR Team	(Canada) Roman De Angelis (Spain) Alex Riberas (Denmark) Marco Sørensen	Aston Martin RA 6.5 L V12	M	295	+23 Laps
18	**LMGT3**	**33**	**(United Kingdom) TF Sport**	**(United Kingdom) Jonny Edgar (Spain) Daniel Juncadella (United States) Ben Keating**	**Chevrolet Corvette Z06 GT3.R**	G	**287**	**+31 Laps‡**
18	**LMGT3**	**33**	**(United Kingdom) TF Sport**	**(United Kingdom) Jonny Edgar (Spain) Daniel Juncadella (United States) Ben Keating**	**Chevrolet LT6.R 5.5 L V8**	G	**287**	**+31 Laps‡**
19	LMGT3	59	(United Kingdom) United Autosports	(France) Sébastien Baud (United Kingdom) James Cottingham (Switzerland) Grégoire Saucy	McLaren 720S GT3 Evo	G	287	+31 Laps
19	LMGT3	59	(United Kingdom) United Autosports	(France) Sébastien Baud (United Kingdom) James Cottingham (Switzerland) Grégoire Saucy	McLaren M840T 4.0 L Turbo V8	G	287	+31 Laps
20	LMGT3	31	(Belgium) The Bend Team WRT	Timur Boguslavskiy (Brazil) Augusto Farfus (Australia) Yasser Shahin	BMW M4 GT3	G	286	+32 Laps
20	LMGT3	31	(Belgium) The Bend Team WRT	Timur Boguslavskiy (Brazil) Augusto Farfus (Australia) Yasser Shahin	BMW P58 3.0 L Turbo I6	G	286	+32 Laps
21	LMGT3	78	(France) Akkodis ASP Team	(United Kingdom) Ben Barnicoat (Germany) Finn Gehrsitz (France) Arnold Robin	Lexus RC F GT3	G	286	+32 Laps
21	LMGT3	78	(France) Akkodis ASP Team	(United Kingdom) Ben Barnicoat (Germany) Finn Gehrsitz (France) Arnold Robin	Lexus 2UR-GSE 5.4 L V8	G	286	+32 Laps
22	LMGT3	21	(Italy) Vista AF Corse	(France) François Heriau (United States) Simon Mann (Italy) Alessio Rovera	Ferrari 296 GT3	G	286	+32 Laps
22	LMGT3	21	(Italy) Vista AF Corse	(France) François Heriau (United States) Simon Mann (Italy) Alessio Rovera	Ferrari F163CE 3.0 L Turbo V6	G	286	+32 Laps
23	LMGT3	27	(United States) Heart of Racing Team	(Italy) Mattia Drudi (United Kingdom) Ian James (Canada) Zacharie Robichon	Aston Martin Vantage AMR GT3 Evo	G	286	+32 Laps
23	LMGT3	27	(United States) Heart of Racing Team	(Italy) Mattia Drudi (United Kingdom) Ian James (Canada) Zacharie Robichon	Aston Martin M177 4.0 L Turbo V8	G	286	+32 Laps
24	LMGT3	95	(United Kingdom) United Autosports	(Indonesia) Sean Gelael (United Kingdom) Darren Leung (Japan) Marino Sato	McLaren 720S GT3 Evo	G	286	+32 Laps
24	LMGT3	95	(United Kingdom) United Autosports	(Indonesia) Sean Gelael (United Kingdom) Darren Leung (Japan) Marino Sato	McLaren M840T 4.0 L Turbo V8	G	286	+32 Laps
25	LMGT3	54	(Italy) Vista AF Corse	(Italy) Francesco Castellacci (Switzerland) Thomas Flohr (Italy) Davide Rigon	Ferrari 296 GT3	G	285	+33 Laps
25	LMGT3	54	(Italy) Vista AF Corse	(Italy) Francesco Castellacci (Switzerland) Thomas Flohr (Italy) Davide Rigon	Ferrari F163CE 3.0 L Turbo V6	G	285	+33 Laps
26	LMGT3	10	(France) Racing Spirit of Léman	(Brazil) Eduardo Barrichello (United States) Derek DeBoer (France) Valentin Hasse-Clot	Aston Martin Vantage AMR GT3 Evo	G	285	+33 Laps
26	LMGT3	10	(France) Racing Spirit of Léman	(Brazil) Eduardo Barrichello (United States) Derek DeBoer (France) Valentin Hasse-Clot	Aston Martin M177 4.0 L Turbo V8	G	285	+33 Laps
27	LMGT3	88	(Germany) Proton Competition	(Italy) Stefano Gattuso (Italy) Giammarco Levorato (Norway) Dennis Olsen	Ford Mustang GT3	G	285	+33 Laps
27	LMGT3	88	(Germany) Proton Competition	(Italy) Stefano Gattuso (Italy) Giammarco Levorato (Norway) Dennis Olsen	Ford Coyote 5.4 L V8	G	285	+33 Laps
28	LMGT3	46	(Belgium) Team WRT	(Oman) Ahmad Al Harthy (Italy) Valentino Rossi (South Africa) Kelvin van der Linde	BMW M4 GT3	G	284	+34 Laps
28	LMGT3	46	(Belgium) Team WRT	(Oman) Ahmad Al Harthy (Italy) Valentino Rossi (South Africa) Kelvin van der Linde	BMW P58 3.0 L Turbo I6	G	284	+34 Laps
29	LMGT3	92	(Germany) Manthey 1st Phorm	(United States) Ryan Hardwick (Austria) Richard Lietz (Italy) Riccardo Pera	Porsche 911 GT3 R (992)	G	284	+34 Laps
29	LMGT3	92	(Germany) Manthey 1st Phorm	(United States) Ryan Hardwick (Austria) Richard Lietz (Italy) Riccardo Pera	Porsche M97/80 4.2 L Flat-6	G	284	+34 Laps
30	LMGT3	85	(Italy) Iron Dames	(Switzerland) Rahel Frey (Denmark) Michelle Gatting (France) Célia Martin	Porsche 911 GT3 R (992)	G	282	+36 Laps
30	LMGT3	85	(Italy) Iron Dames	(Switzerland) Rahel Frey (Denmark) Michelle Gatting (France) Célia Martin	Porsche M97/80 4.2 L Flat-6	G	282	+36 Laps
NC	LMGT3	60	(Italy) Iron Lynx	(Italy) Matteo Cairoli (Italy) Matteo Cressoni (Italy) Claudio Schiavoni	Mercedes-AMG GT3 Evo	G	194	Not classified
NC	LMGT3	60	(Italy) Iron Lynx	(Italy) Matteo Cairoli (Italy) Matteo Cressoni (Italy) Claudio Schiavoni	Mercedes-AMG M159 6.2 L V8	G	194	Not classified
Ret	Hypercar	007	(United Kingdom) Aston Martin THOR Team	(United Kingdom) Tom Gamble (United Kingdom) Ross Gunn (United Kingdom) Harry Tincknell	Aston Martin Valkyrie	M	181	Transmission
Ret	Hypercar	007	(United Kingdom) Aston Martin THOR Team	(United Kingdom) Tom Gamble (United Kingdom) Ross Gunn (United Kingdom) Harry Tincknell	Aston Martin RA 6.5 L V12	M	181	Transmission
Ret	LMGT3	77	(Germany) Proton Competition	(United Kingdom) Ben Barker (Portugal) Bernardo Sousa (United Kingdom) Ben Tuck	Ford Mustang GT3	G	148	Fire
Ret	LMGT3	77	(Germany) Proton Competition	(United Kingdom) Ben Barker (Portugal) Bernardo Sousa (United Kingdom) Ben Tuck	Ford Coyote 5.4 L V8	G	148	Fire
Ret	LMGT3	61	(Italy) Iron Lynx	(Netherlands) Lin Hodenius (Belgium) Maxime Martin (Germany) Christian Ried	Mercedes-AMG GT3 Evo	G	59	Did not finish
Ret	LMGT3	61	(Italy) Iron Lynx	(Netherlands) Lin Hodenius (Belgium) Maxime Martin (Germany) Christian Ried	Mercedes-AMG M159 6.2 L V8	G	59	Did not finish
Ret	LMGT3	81	(United Kingdom) TF Sport	(Angola) Rui Andrade (Republic of Ireland) Charlie Eastwood (Belgium) Tom van Rompuy	Chevrolet Corvette Z06 GT3.R	G	27	Electrical
Ret	LMGT3	81	(United Kingdom) TF Sport	(Angola) Rui Andrade (Republic of Ireland) Charlie Eastwood (Belgium) Tom van Rompuy	Chevrolet LT6.R 5.5 L V8	G	27	Electrical
Ret	LMGT3	87	(France) Akkodis ASP Team	(Argentina) José María López (Austria) Clemens Schmid (Romania) Răzvan Umbrărescu	Lexus RC F GT3	G	15	Did not finish
Ret	LMGT3	87	(France) Akkodis ASP Team	(Argentina) José María López (Austria) Clemens Schmid (Romania) Răzvan Umbrărescu	Lexus 2UR-GSE 5.4 L V8	G	15	Did not finish

== Official recordings ==
- Free Practice 3 | 2025 Qatar 1812KM on YouTube
- Qualifying And Hyperpole Sessions | 2025 Qatar 1812KM on YouTube
- Full Race | 2025 Qatar 1812KM on YouTube

FIA World Endurance Championship
Previous race: None	2025 season	Next race: 6 Hours of Imola
