= 2025 6 Hours of Imola =

Endurance sportscar racing event

(Italy) 2025 6 Hours of Imola
Event information
- Round 2 of 8 in the 2025 FIA World Endurance Championship
- Date: 20 April 2025
- Location: Imola
- Venue: Autodromo Internazionale Enzo e Dino Ferrari
- Duration: 6 hours

Results
- Laps completed: 212
- Distance (km): 1040.490
- Distance (miles): 646.531
- Hypercar

Pole position
- Time: 1:28.920
- Team: (Italy) Ferrari AF Corse
- Drivers: (Italy) Antonio Giovinazzi

Winners
- Team: (Italy) Ferrari AF Corse
- Drivers: (United Kingdom) James Calado (Italy) Antonio Giovinazzi (Italy) Alessandro Pier Guidi
- LMGT3

Winners
- Team: (Germany) Manthey 1st Phorm
- Drivers: (United States) Ryan Hardwick (Austria) Richard Lietz (Italy) Riccardo Pera

The 2025 6 Hours of Imola was an endurance sportscar racing event, held between 18 and 20 April 2025, as the second of eight rounds of the 2025 FIA World Endurance Championship. It was the third running of the event, and the second consecutive running of the event as part of the World Endurance Championship.

== Background ==
The event was announced on 14 June 2024, during the 2024 24 Hours of Le Mans weekend. After replacing the Monza event in 2024, a four-year deal was signed for the circuit to keep its place on the calendar until at least 2028.

== Entry list ==
The entry list was published on 4 April 2025 and consisted of 36 entries across 2 categories – 18 in both Hypercar and LMGT3. In the Hypercar category, Aston Martin ran only two drivers, with Ross Gunn and Roman De Angelis dropped from the No. 007 and No. 009, respectively. The only notable change in the LMGT3 category was Esteban Masson who replaced Ben Barnicoat in the No. 78 Akkodis ASP Team entry, after the latter had suffered an injury.

== Schedule ==
Date	Time (local: CEST)	Event
Friday, 18 April	11:15	Free Practice 1
Friday, 18 April	16:00	Free Practice 2
Saturday, 19 April	10:40	Free Practice 3
Saturday, 19 April	14:30	Qualifying - LMGT3
Saturday, 19 April	14:50	Hyperpole - LMGT3
Saturday, 19 April	15:10	Qualifying - Hypercar
Saturday, 19 April	15:30	Hyperpole - Hypercar
Sunday, 20 April	13:00	Race

== Practice ==
Three practice sessions were held before the event: two on Friday, and one on Saturday. The sessions on Friday morning and Friday afternoon lasted 90 minutes, and the session on Saturday morning lasted 60 minutes.

=== Practice 1 ===
The first practice session started at 11:15 CEST on Friday. The session was topped by Robert Kubica in the No. 83 AF Corse Ferrari, lapping the circuit in 1 minute and 32.065 seconds. Kubica's lap was 0.236 seconds quicker than that of Antonio Fuoco in the No. 50 Ferrari AF Corse entry, with Alex Lynn in the No. 12 Cadillac Hertz Team Jota entry in third, 0.266 seconds behind Kubica. The LMGT3 class was topped by Augusto Farfus in the No. 31 The Bend Team WRT BMW, with a lap time of 1:43.330. Esteban Masson was second in the No. 78 Akkodis ASP Team Lexus, 0.093 seconds behind Farfus. Kelvin van der Linde's No. 46 Team WRT BMW rounded out the top three, 0.123 seconds off the pace.

Class	No.	Entrant	Driver	Time
Hypercar	83	(Italy) AF Corse	(Poland) Robert Kubica	1:32.065
LMGT3	31	(Belgium) The Bend Team WRT	(Brazil) Augusto Farfus	1:43.330

- Note: Only the fastest car in each class is shown.

=== Practice 2 ===
The second practice session started at 16:00 CEST on Friday and ran for 90 minutes. Antonio Giovinazzi in the No. 51 Ferrari and Dries Vanthoor in the No. 15 BMW M Team WRT entry set an identical lap of 1:31.040. Mick Schumacher rounded out the top three in the No. 36 Alpine Endurance Team entry, 0.243 seconds behind Giovinazzi and Vanthoor. Clemens Schmid led the LMGT3 class in the No. 87 Lexus, lapping the circuit in 1:42.944. His lap was 0.119 seconds quicker than that of team-mate Finn Gehrsitz in the No. 78 Lexus, with Van der Linde in the No. 46 BMW once again in third place.

Class	No.	Entrant	Driver	Time
Hypercar	51	(Italy) Ferrari AF Corse	(Italy) Antonio Giovinazzi	1:31.040
LMGT3	87	(France) Akkodis ASP Team	(Austria) Clemens Schmid	1:42.944

- Note: Only the fastest car in each class is shown.

=== Practice 3 ===
The third and final practice session started at 10:40 CEST on Saturday. Giovinazzi topped the session in the No. 51 Ferrari, with a lap time of 1:30.272. He was 0.063 seconds quicker than Fuoco in the No. 50 Ferrari in second, with the No. 94 Peugeot TotalEnergies entry of Stoffel Vandoorne the best non-Ferrari in third, 1.398 seconds off the pace. Masson topped the session in LMGT3 in the No. 78 Lexus, with a lap time of 1:42.852, 0.206 seconds quicker than Alessio Rovera's No. 21 Vista AF Corse Ferrari in second. Davide Rigon finished third in the sister No. 54 Ferrari, 0.349 seconds behind Masson.

Class	No.	Entrant	Driver	Time
Hypercar	51	(Italy) Ferrari AF Corse	(Italy) Antonio Giovinazzi	1:30.272
LMGT3	78	(France) Akkodis ASP Team	(France) Esteban Masson	1:42.852

- Note: Only the fastest car in each class is shown.

== Qualifying ==
=== Qualifying results ===
Pole position winners in each class are marked in bold.

Pos	Class	No.	Entrant	Qualifying	Hyperpole	Grid
1	**Hypercar**	**51**	**(Italy) Ferrari AF Corse**	**1:29.623**	**1:28.920**	1
2	Hypercar	83	(Italy) AF Corse	1:29.993	1:29.678	2
3	Hypercar	15	(Germany) BMW M Team WRT	1:30.375	1:29.885	3
4	Hypercar	8	(Japan) Toyota Gazoo Racing	1:30.534	1:30.042	4
5	Hypercar	7	(Japan) Toyota Gazoo Racing	1:30.477	1:30.043	5
6	Hypercar	36	(France) Alpine Endurance Team	1:30.663	1:30.190	6
7	Hypercar	93	(France) Peugeot TotalEnergies	1:30.833	1:30.301	7
8	Hypercar	35	(France) Alpine Endurance Team	1:30.794	1:30.305	8
9	Hypercar	12	(United States) Cadillac Hertz Team Jota	1:30.497	1:30.448	9
10	Hypercar	6	(Germany) Porsche Penske Motorsport	1:30.704	1:30.815	10
11	Hypercar	94	(France) Peugeot TotalEnergies	1:30.848		11
12	Hypercar	5	(Germany) Porsche Penske Motorsport	1:30.862		12
13	Hypercar	20	(Germany) BMW M Team WRT	1:30.970		13
14	Hypercar	99	(Germany) Proton Competition	1:31.382		14
15	Hypercar	38	(United States) Cadillac Hertz Team Jota	1:31.925		15
16	Hypercar	007	(United Kingdom) Aston Martin THOR Team	1:31.963		16
17	Hypercar	009	(United Kingdom) Aston Martin THOR Team	1:32.853		17
18	Hypercar	50	(Italy) Ferrari AF Corse	1:46.400		18
19	**LMGT3**	**46**	**(Belgium) Team WRT**	**1:42.731**	**1:42.355**	19
20	LMGT3	87	(France) Akkodis ASP Team	1:44.298	1:42.661	20
21	LMGT3	27	(United States) Heart of Racing Team	1:43.994	1:42.703	21
22	LMGT3	21	(Italy) Vista AF Corse	1:43.498	1:42.920	22
23	LMGT3	78	(France) Akkodis ASP Team	1:43.525	1:43.132	23
24	LMGT3	88	(Germany) Proton Competition	1:44.107	1:43.152	24
25	LMGT3	92	(Germany) Manthey 1st Phorm	1:44.272	1:43.376	25
26	LMGT3	95	(United Kingdom) United Autosports	1:43.625	1:43.413	26
27	LMGT3	59	(United Kingdom) United Autosports	1:43.912	1:43.721	27
28	LMGT3	81	(United Kingdom) TF Sport	1:44.307	1:43.807	28
29	LMGT3	54	(Italy) Vista AF Corse	1:44.348		29
30	LMGT3	31	(Belgium) The Bend Team WRT	1:44.376		30
31	LMGT3	77	(Germany) Proton Competition	1:44.412		31
32	LMGT3	85	(Italy) Iron Dames	1:44.440		32
33	LMGT3	10	(France) Racing Spirit of Léman	1:44.591		33
34	LMGT3	33	(United Kingdom) TF Sport	1:44.963		34
35	LMGT3	60	(Italy) Iron Lynx	1:46.619		35
36	LMGT3	61	(Italy) Iron Lynx	1:46.636		36

== Race ==
=== Race results ===
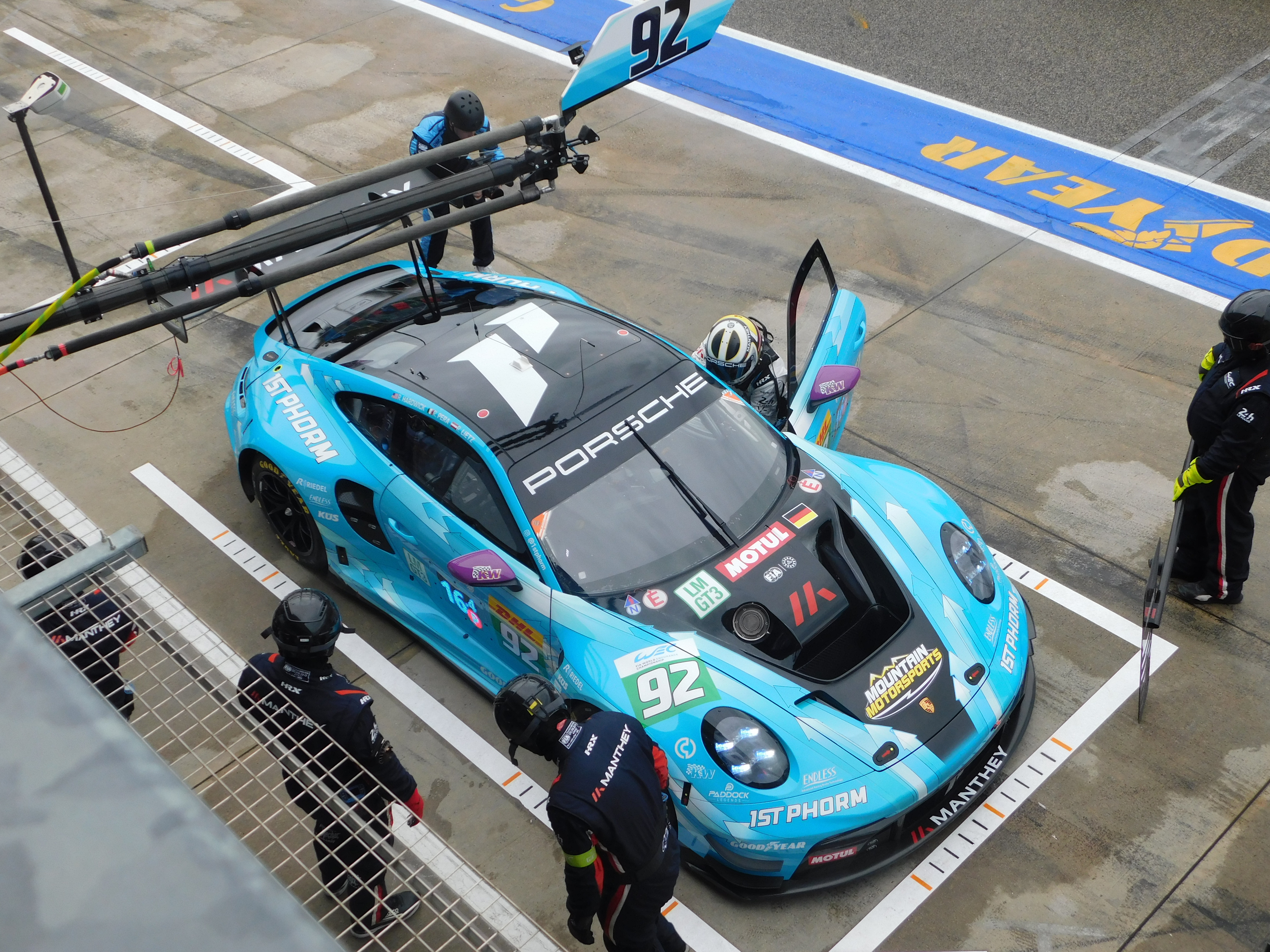
The No. 92 Manthey 1st Phorm Porsche that took the LMGT3 class win.

The minimum number of laps for classification (70% of overall winning car's distance) was 148 laps. Class winners are in bold and ‡.

Pos	Class	No	Team	Drivers	Chassis	Tyre	Laps	Time/Retired
Pos	Class	No	Team	Drivers	Engine	Tyre	Laps	Time/Retired
1	**Hypercar**	**51**	**(Italy) Ferrari AF Corse**	**(United Kingdom) James Calado (Italy) Antonio Giovinazzi (Italy) Alessandro Pier Guidi**	**Ferrari 499P**	M	**212**	**6:00:28.365‡**
1	**Hypercar**	**51**	**(Italy) Ferrari AF Corse**	**(United Kingdom) James Calado (Italy) Antonio Giovinazzi (Italy) Alessandro Pier Guidi**	**Ferrari F163 3.0 L Turbo V6**	M	**212**	**6:00:28.365‡**
2	Hypercar	20	(Germany) BMW M Team WRT	(Netherlands) Robin Frijns (Germany) René Rast (South Africa) Sheldon van der Linde	BMW M Hybrid V8	M	212	+8.490
2	Hypercar	20	(Germany) BMW M Team WRT	(Netherlands) Robin Frijns (Germany) René Rast (South Africa) Sheldon van der Linde	BMW P66/3 4.0 L Turbo V8	M	212	+8.490
3	Hypercar	36	(France) Alpine Endurance Team	(France) Jules Gounon (France) Frédéric Makowiecki (Germany) Mick Schumacher	Alpine A424	M	212	+12.450
3	Hypercar	36	(France) Alpine Endurance Team	(France) Jules Gounon (France) Frédéric Makowiecki (Germany) Mick Schumacher	Alpine V634 3.4 L Turbo V6	M	212	+12.450
4	Hypercar	83	(Italy) AF Corse	(United Kingdom) Phil Hanson (Poland) Robert Kubica (China) Yifei Ye	Ferrari 499P	M	212	+20.597
4	Hypercar	83	(Italy) AF Corse	(United Kingdom) Phil Hanson (Poland) Robert Kubica (China) Yifei Ye	Ferrari F163 3.0 L Turbo V6	M	212	+20.597
5	Hypercar	8	(Japan) Toyota Gazoo Racing	(Switzerland) Sébastien Buemi (New Zealand) Brendon Hartley (Japan) Ryō Hirakawa	Toyota GR010 Hybrid	M	212	+23.210
5	Hypercar	8	(Japan) Toyota Gazoo Racing	(Switzerland) Sébastien Buemi (New Zealand) Brendon Hartley (Japan) Ryō Hirakawa	Toyota H8909 3.5 L Turbo V6	M	212	+23.210
6	Hypercar	15	(Germany) BMW M Team WRT	(Denmark) Kevin Magnussen (Switzerland) Raffaele Marciello (Belgium) Dries Vanthoor	BMW M Hybrid V8	M	212	+25.516
6	Hypercar	15	(Germany) BMW M Team WRT	(Denmark) Kevin Magnussen (Switzerland) Raffaele Marciello (Belgium) Dries Vanthoor	BMW P66/3 4.0 L Turbo V8	M	212	+25.516
7	Hypercar	7	(Japan) Toyota Gazoo Racing	(United Kingdom) Mike Conway (Japan) Kamui Kobayashi (Netherlands) Nyck de Vries	Toyota GR010 Hybrid	M	212	+31.478
7	Hypercar	7	(Japan) Toyota Gazoo Racing	(United Kingdom) Mike Conway (Japan) Kamui Kobayashi (Netherlands) Nyck de Vries	Toyota H8909 3.5 L Turbo V6	M	212	+31.478
8	Hypercar	6	(Germany) Porsche Penske Motorsport	(Australia) Matt Campbell (France) Kévin Estre (Belgium) Laurens Vanthoor	Porsche 963	M	212	+41.280
8	Hypercar	6	(Germany) Porsche Penske Motorsport	(Australia) Matt Campbell (France) Kévin Estre (Belgium) Laurens Vanthoor	Porsche 9RD 4.6 L Turbo V8	M	212	+41.280
9	Hypercar	93	(France) Peugeot TotalEnergies	(Denmark) Mikkel Jensen (United Kingdom) Paul di Resta (France) Jean-Éric Vergne	Peugeot 9X8	M	212	+50.904
9	Hypercar	93	(France) Peugeot TotalEnergies	(Denmark) Mikkel Jensen (United Kingdom) Paul di Resta (France) Jean-Éric Vergne	Peugeot X6H 2.6 L Turbo V6	M	212	+50.904
10	Hypercar	12	(United States) Cadillac Hertz Team Jota	(United Kingdom) Alex Lynn (France) Norman Nato (United Kingdom) Will Stevens	Cadillac V-Series.R	M	212	+53.300
10	Hypercar	12	(United States) Cadillac Hertz Team Jota	(United Kingdom) Alex Lynn (France) Norman Nato (United Kingdom) Will Stevens	Cadillac LMC55R 5.5 L V8	M	212	+53.300
11	Hypercar	5	(Germany) Porsche Penske Motorsport	(France) Julien Andlauer (Denmark) Michael Christensen (France) Mathieu Jaminet	Porsche 963	M	212	+1:14.220
11	Hypercar	5	(Germany) Porsche Penske Motorsport	(France) Julien Andlauer (Denmark) Michael Christensen (France) Mathieu Jaminet	Porsche 9RD 4.6 L Turbo V8	M	212	+1:14.220
12	Hypercar	94	(France) Peugeot TotalEnergies	(France) Loïc Duval (Denmark) Malthe Jakobsen (Belgium) Stoffel Vandoorne	Peugeot 9X8	M	212	+1:15.285
12	Hypercar	94	(France) Peugeot TotalEnergies	(France) Loïc Duval (Denmark) Malthe Jakobsen (Belgium) Stoffel Vandoorne	Peugeot X6H 2.6 L Turbo V6	M	212	+1:15.285
13	Hypercar	35	(France) Alpine Endurance Team	(France) Paul-Loup Chatin (Austria) Ferdinand Habsburg (France) Charles Milesi	Alpine A424	M	212	+1:16.135
13	Hypercar	35	(France) Alpine Endurance Team	(France) Paul-Loup Chatin (Austria) Ferdinand Habsburg (France) Charles Milesi	Alpine V634 3.4 L Turbo V6	M	212	+1:16.135
14	Hypercar	99	(Germany) Proton Competition	(Switzerland) Neel Jani (Chile) Nico Pino (Argentina) Nicolás Varrone	Porsche 963	M	212	+1:17.150
14	Hypercar	99	(Germany) Proton Competition	(Switzerland) Neel Jani (Chile) Nico Pino (Argentina) Nicolás Varrone	Porsche 9RD 4.6 L Turbo V8	M	212	+1:17.150
15	Hypercar	50	(Italy) Ferrari AF Corse	(Italy) Antonio Fuoco (Spain) Miguel Molina (Denmark) Nicklas Nielsen	Ferrari 499P	M	211	+1 Lap
15	Hypercar	50	(Italy) Ferrari AF Corse	(Italy) Antonio Fuoco (Spain) Miguel Molina (Denmark) Nicklas Nielsen	Ferrari F163 3.0 L Turbo V6	M	211	+1 Lap
16	Hypercar	38	(United States) Cadillac Hertz Team Jota	(New Zealand) Earl Bamber (France) Sébastien Bourdais (United Kingdom) Jenson Button	Cadillac V-Series.R	M	210	+2 Laps
16	Hypercar	38	(United States) Cadillac Hertz Team Jota	(New Zealand) Earl Bamber (France) Sébastien Bourdais (United Kingdom) Jenson Button	Cadillac LMC55R 5.5 L V8	M	210	+2 Laps
17	Hypercar	009	(United Kingdom) Aston Martin THOR Team	(Spain) Alex Riberas (Denmark) Marco Sørensen	Aston Martin Valkyrie	M	208	+4 Laps
17	Hypercar	009	(United Kingdom) Aston Martin THOR Team	(Spain) Alex Riberas (Denmark) Marco Sørensen	Aston Martin RA 6.5 L V12	M	208	+4 Laps
18	Hypercar	007	(United Kingdom) Aston Martin THOR Team	(United Kingdom) Tom Gamble (United Kingdom) Harry Tincknell	Aston Martin Valkyrie	M	208	+4 Laps
18	Hypercar	007	(United Kingdom) Aston Martin THOR Team	(United Kingdom) Tom Gamble (United Kingdom) Harry Tincknell	Aston Martin RA 6.5 L V12	M	208	+4 Laps
19	**LMGT3**	**92**	**(Germany) Manthey 1st Phorm**	**(United States) Ryan Hardwick (Austria) Richard Lietz (Italy) Riccardo Pera**	**Porsche 911 GT3 R (992)**	G	**193**	**+19 Laps‡**
19	**LMGT3**	**92**	**(Germany) Manthey 1st Phorm**	**(United States) Ryan Hardwick (Austria) Richard Lietz (Italy) Riccardo Pera**	**Porsche M97/80 4.2 L Flat-6**	G	**193**	**+19 Laps‡**
20	LMGT3	46	(Belgium) Team WRT	(Oman) Ahmad Al Harthy (Italy) Valentino Rossi (South Africa) Kelvin van der Linde	BMW M4 GT3	G	193	+19 Laps
20	LMGT3	46	(Belgium) Team WRT	(Oman) Ahmad Al Harthy (Italy) Valentino Rossi (South Africa) Kelvin van der Linde	BMW P58 3.0 L Turbo I6	G	193	+19 Laps
21	LMGT3	78	(France) Akkodis ASP Team	(Germany) Finn Gehrsitz (France) Esteban Masson (France) Arnold Robin	Lexus RC F GT3	G	193	+19 Laps
21	LMGT3	78	(France) Akkodis ASP Team	(Germany) Finn Gehrsitz (France) Esteban Masson (France) Arnold Robin	Lexus 2UR-GSE 5.4 L V8	G	193	+19 Laps
22	LMGT3	87	(France) Akkodis ASP Team	(Argentina) José María López (Austria) Clemens Schmid (Romania) Răzvan Umbrărescu	Lexus RC F GT3	G	193	+19 Laps
22	LMGT3	87	(France) Akkodis ASP Team	(Argentina) José María López (Austria) Clemens Schmid (Romania) Răzvan Umbrărescu	Lexus 2UR-GSE 5.4 L V8	G	193	+19 Laps
23	LMGT3	54	(Italy) Vista AF Corse	(Italy) Francesco Castellacci (Switzerland) Thomas Flohr (Italy) Davide Rigon	Ferrari 296 GT3	G	192	+20 Laps
23	LMGT3	54	(Italy) Vista AF Corse	(Italy) Francesco Castellacci (Switzerland) Thomas Flohr (Italy) Davide Rigon	Ferrari F163CE 3.0 L Turbo V6	G	192	+20 Laps
24	LMGT3	81	(United Kingdom) TF Sport	(Angola) Rui Andrade (Republic of Ireland) Charlie Eastwood (Belgium) Tom van Rompuy	Chevrolet Corvette Z06 GT3.R	G	192	+20 Laps
24	LMGT3	81	(United Kingdom) TF Sport	(Angola) Rui Andrade (Republic of Ireland) Charlie Eastwood (Belgium) Tom van Rompuy	Chevrolet LT6.R 5.5 L V8	G	192	+20 Laps
25	LMGT3	33	(United Kingdom) TF Sport	(United Kingdom) Jonny Edgar (Spain) Daniel Juncadella (United States) Ben Keating	Chevrolet Corvette Z06 GT3.R	G	192	+20 Laps
25	LMGT3	33	(United Kingdom) TF Sport	(United Kingdom) Jonny Edgar (Spain) Daniel Juncadella (United States) Ben Keating	Chevrolet LT6.R 5.5 L V8	G	192	+20 Laps
26	LMGT3	85	(Italy) Iron Dames	(Switzerland) Rahel Frey (Denmark) Michelle Gatting (France) Célia Martin	Porsche 911 GT3 R (992)	G	192	+20 Laps
26	LMGT3	85	(Italy) Iron Dames	(Switzerland) Rahel Frey (Denmark) Michelle Gatting (France) Célia Martin	Porsche M97/80 4.2 L Flat-6	G	192	+20 Laps
27	LMGT3	95	(United Kingdom) United Autosports	(Indonesia) Sean Gelael (United Kingdom) Darren Leung (Japan) Marino Sato	McLaren 720S GT3 Evo	G	192	+20 Laps
27	LMGT3	95	(United Kingdom) United Autosports	(Indonesia) Sean Gelael (United Kingdom) Darren Leung (Japan) Marino Sato	McLaren M840T 4.0 L Turbo V8	G	192	+20 Laps
28	LMGT3	77	(Germany) Proton Competition	(United Kingdom) Ben Barker (Portugal) Bernardo Sousa (United Kingdom) Ben Tuck	Ford Mustang GT3	G	192	+20 Laps
28	LMGT3	77	(Germany) Proton Competition	(United Kingdom) Ben Barker (Portugal) Bernardo Sousa (United Kingdom) Ben Tuck	Ford Coyote 5.4 L V8	G	192	+20 Laps
29	LMGT3	10	(France) Racing Spirit of Léman	(Brazil) Eduardo Barrichello (United States) Derek DeBoer (France) Valentin Hasse-Clot	Aston Martin Vantage AMR GT3 Evo	G	192	+20 Laps
29	LMGT3	10	(France) Racing Spirit of Léman	(Brazil) Eduardo Barrichello (United States) Derek DeBoer (France) Valentin Hasse-Clot	Aston Martin M177 4.0 L Turbo V8	G	192	+20 Laps
30	LMGT3	31	(Belgium) The Bend Team WRT	Timur Boguslavskiy (Brazil) Augusto Farfus (Australia) Yasser Shahin	BMW M4 GT3	G	191	+21 Laps
30	LMGT3	31	(Belgium) The Bend Team WRT	Timur Boguslavskiy (Brazil) Augusto Farfus (Australia) Yasser Shahin	BMW P58 3.0 L Turbo I6	G	191	+21 Laps
31	LMGT3	61	(Italy) Iron Lynx	(Netherlands) Lin Hodenius (Belgium) Maxime Martin (Germany) Christian Ried	Mercedes-AMG GT3 Evo	G	191	+21 Laps
31	LMGT3	61	(Italy) Iron Lynx	(Netherlands) Lin Hodenius (Belgium) Maxime Martin (Germany) Christian Ried	Mercedes-AMG M159 6.2 L V8	G	191	+21 Laps
32	LMGT3	59	(United Kingdom) United Autosports	(France) Sébastien Baud (United Kingdom) James Cottingham (Switzerland) Grégoire Saucy	McLaren 720S GT3 Evo	G	191	+21 Laps
32	LMGT3	59	(United Kingdom) United Autosports	(France) Sébastien Baud (United Kingdom) James Cottingham (Switzerland) Grégoire Saucy	McLaren M840T 4.0 L Turbo V8	G	191	+21 Laps
33	LMGT3	60	(Italy) Iron Lynx	(Italy) Matteo Cairoli (Italy) Matteo Cressoni (Italy) Claudio Schiavoni	Mercedes-AMG GT3 Evo	G	191	+21 Laps
33	LMGT3	60	(Italy) Iron Lynx	(Italy) Matteo Cairoli (Italy) Matteo Cressoni (Italy) Claudio Schiavoni	Mercedes-AMG M159 6.2 L V8	G	191	+21 Laps
34	LMGT3	88	(Germany) Proton Competition	(Italy) Stefano Gattuso (Italy) Giammarco Levorato (Norway) Dennis Olsen	Ford Mustang GT3	G	191	+21 Laps
34	LMGT3	88	(Germany) Proton Competition	(Italy) Stefano Gattuso (Italy) Giammarco Levorato (Norway) Dennis Olsen	Ford Coyote 5.4 L V8	G	191	+21 Laps
Ret	LMGT3	21	(Italy) Vista AF Corse	(France) François Heriau (United States) Simon Mann (Italy) Alessio Rovera	Ferrari 296 GT3	G	119	Accident
Ret	LMGT3	21	(Italy) Vista AF Corse	(France) François Heriau (United States) Simon Mann (Italy) Alessio Rovera	Ferrari F163CE 3.0 L Turbo V6	G	119	Accident
Ret	LMGT3	27	(United States) Heart of Racing Team	(Italy) Mattia Drudi (United Kingdom) Ian James (Canada) Zacharie Robichon	Aston Martin Vantage AMR GT3 Evo	G	49	Accident
Ret	LMGT3	27	(United States) Heart of Racing Team	(Italy) Mattia Drudi (United Kingdom) Ian James (Canada) Zacharie Robichon	Aston Martin M177 4.0 L Turbo V8	G	49	Accident

FIA World Endurance Championship
Previous race: Qatar 1812 km	2025 season	Next race: 6 Hours of Spa-Francorchamps
