= Ferrari 499P =

Sports prototype racing car

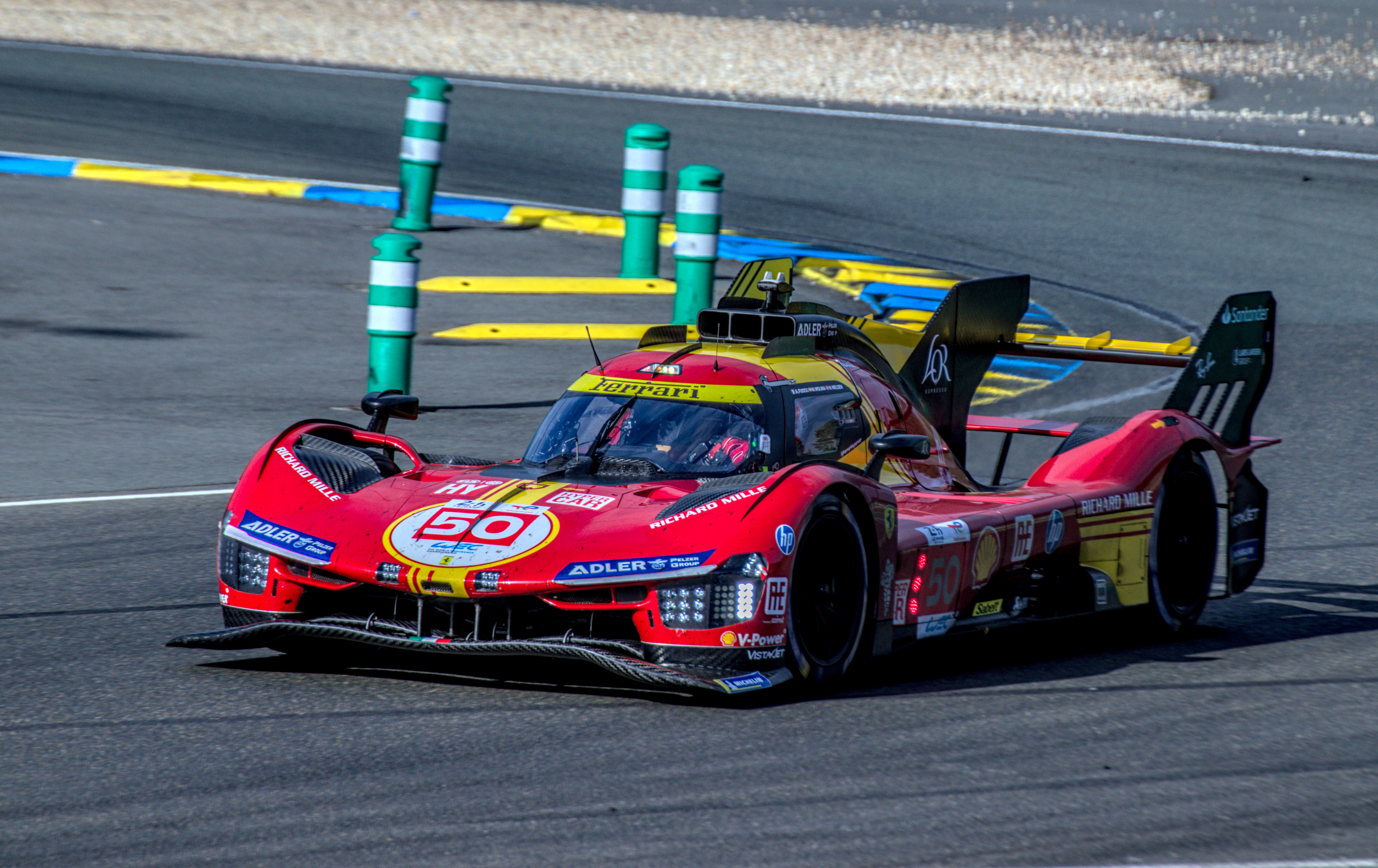
- The No. 50 499P that took the overall victory at the 2024 24 Hours of Le Mans
- Category: Le Mans Hypercar
- Designers: Flavio Manzoni (Design Director, Centro Stile Ferrari); Ferdinando Cannizzo (Technical Director); Stefano Carmassi (Technical Manager); Carlo Palazzani (Exterior Designer); Francesco Russo (Advanced Lead Designer); Silvia Cavallaro (Head of Color and Trim)
- Predecessor: Ferrari 333 SP

Technical specifications
- Chassis: Carbon fibre monocoque
- Suspension: Double wishbones with pushrods
- Engine: Ferrari F163CG 2,992 cc (182.6 cu in) 120° V6 twin-turbo, longitudinally-mounted
- Electric motor: 200 kW (272 PS; 268 hp); 275 pound-feet (373 N⋅m) mounted on the front axle
- Transmission: Xtrac 7-speed sequential manual
- Battery: Ferrari 800 V
- Power: 671 bhp (680 PS; 500 kW); 580 pound-feet (790 N⋅m) (Petrol); 268 bhp (272 PS; 200 kW); 275 pound-feet (373 N⋅m) (Electric)
- Weight: 1,030 kg (2,270.8 lb)
- Fuel: TotalEnergies
- Lubricants: Shell Helix Ultra
- Brakes: Brembo carbon 380/355mm with Brembo Monobloc 6-piston calipers
- Tyres: Michelin slicks with OZ one-piece forged alloys, 29/71-18 front and 34/71-18 rear

Competition history
- Notable entrants: (Italy) Ferrari – AF Corse; (Italy) AF Corse
- Notable drivers: (Italy) Antonio Giovinazzi; (Italy) Alessandro Pier Guidi; (Italy) Antonio Fuoco; (Spain) Miguel Molina; (Denmark) Nicklas Nielsen; (United Kingdom) James Calado; (Poland) Robert Kubica; (Israel) Robert Shwartzman; (China) Yifei Ye; (United Kingdom) Phil Hanson
- Debut: 2023 1000 Miles of Sebring
- First win: 2023 24 Hours of Le Mans
- Last win: 2026 4 Hours of Le Castellet
- Last event: 2026 4 Hours of Le Castellet
Races	Wins	Podiums	Poles	F/Laps
27	8	27	11	6
- Teams' Championships: 1 (2025 FIA WEC (FIA Hypercar World Cup))
- Constructors' Championships: 1 (2025 FIA WEC)
- Drivers' Championships: 1 (2025 FIA WEC)

The Ferrari 499P (project code F255) is a sports prototype built by Scuderia Ferrari to compete in the FIA World Endurance Championship in the Le Mans Hypercar category since 2023. The introduction of the 499P marks 50 years since Ferrari last fielded a factory-backed sports prototype that contested for the overall win at the 24 Hours of Le Mans, and one of the 499Ps raced with the number 50 as a tribute.

The car was unveiled in October 2022 at the Ferrari Finali Mondiali, Ferrari's annual finale for their one-make series, Ferrari Challenge. The car made its competitive debut at the season-opening round of the 2023 FIA World Endurance Championship, the 2023 1000 Miles of Sebring. On its first outing at the 2023 24 Hours of Le Mans, the 499P driven by Antonio Giovinazzi, Alessandro Pier Guidi, and James Calado won the race. It was Ferrari's first overall victory at Le Mans since the 1965 24 Hours of Le Mans, ending the streak of five victories by Toyota Gazoo Racing. At the 2024 24 Hours of Le Mans, Ferrari achieved its eleventh victory, second consecutive at Le Mans, with the No. 50 499P driven by Antonio Fuoco, Miguel Molina and Nicklas Nielsen, while the No. 51 499P driven by Alessandro Pier Guidi, James Calado, and Antonio Giovinazzi, winner of the previous edition, came in third place. The 2025 24 Hours of Le Mans saw the number 83 car, operated by AF Corse and driven by Robert Kubica, Yifei Ye, and Phil Hanson, take the Ferrari brand to a third consecutive Le Mans victory, with the number 51 car finishing in third and the number 50 car finishing fourth.

== Specifications ==
The 499P was designed under the Le Mans Hypercar regulations, therefore it does not feature the standardised parts such as the ones found in cars designed to the Le Mans Daytona h regulations, which the 499P races against. However, the chassis is still manufactured by Dallara. The aerodynamics of the 499P were developed in conjunction with Ferrari's Styling Centre, headed by Flavio Manzoni, under Ferdinando Cannizzo, head of Ferrari's sports car engineering department.

The car's 2,992 cc (182.6 cu in) twin-turbocharged V6 engine architecture is shared with the Ferrari 296 and its Group GT3 counterpart, the 296 GT3. However, instead of being mounted to the subframe as in the road-going vehicle, the engine is a fully stressed member in the 499P, and has had various modifications to accommodate its new role as a stress-bearing member. The 499P has semi-permanent all-wheel drive, with an electric motor situated at the front axle, providing 200 kW (272 PS; 268 hp) above 190 km/h (118 mph) (as stipulated by the regulations), and is connected to a bespoke 900 V battery pack, with the ability to be recharged by Ferrari's own Energy Recovery System (ERS).

=== 499P Modificata ===
The 499P Modificata was unveiled during the 2023 Ferrari Finali Mondiali. It is a non-competitive, unrestricted, track-only version of the 499P, made to celebrate Ferrari's victory at Le Mans that year. On 18 March 2024, the first event of the Sport Prototipi Clienti program took place at the Mugello Circuit in which the 499P Modificata took part.

== Competition history ==
=== 2023 ===
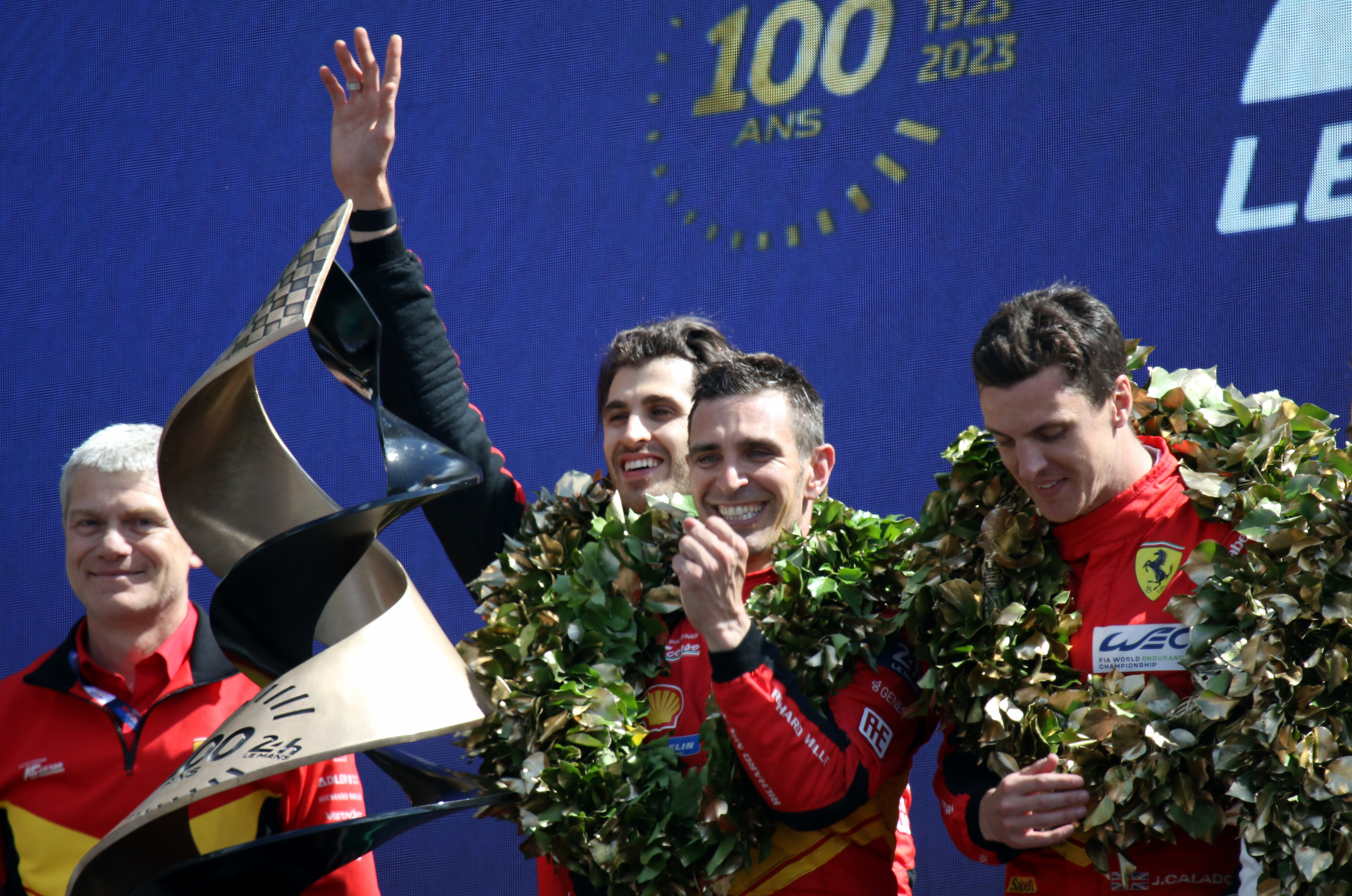
The winning #51 crew of Antonio Giovinazzi, Alessandro Pier Guidi, and James Calado on the podium at the 2023 24 Hours of Le Mans.

The driver lineups for both cars consisted of drivers from AF Corse's programmes, the Ferrari Driver Academy junior team, and a reserve from Scuderia Ferrari. Antonio Fuoco, Miguel Molina, and Nicklas Nielsen formed the #50 crew, and James Calado, Antonio Giovinazzi, and Alessandro Pier Guidi completed the #51 crew.

The 499P was immediately competitive in its first race, with Antonio Fuoco behind the wheel of the #50 car scoring pole position ahead of both GR010 Hybrid entries from defending champions Toyota. Mistakes in the race caused the #50 to fall from the lead however it would manage to take home a podium in 3rd two laps down on the leading Toyotas, whereas the #51 finished 11 laps down. Its first major race victory came at the 2023 24 Hours of Le Mans, winning with Calado, Giovinazzi, and Pier Guidi, marking Ferrari's first win at Le Mans since 1965. The 499P would podium in every race except at Fuji, resulting in Ferrari finishing second in the Manufacturers' Championship.

=== 2024 ===
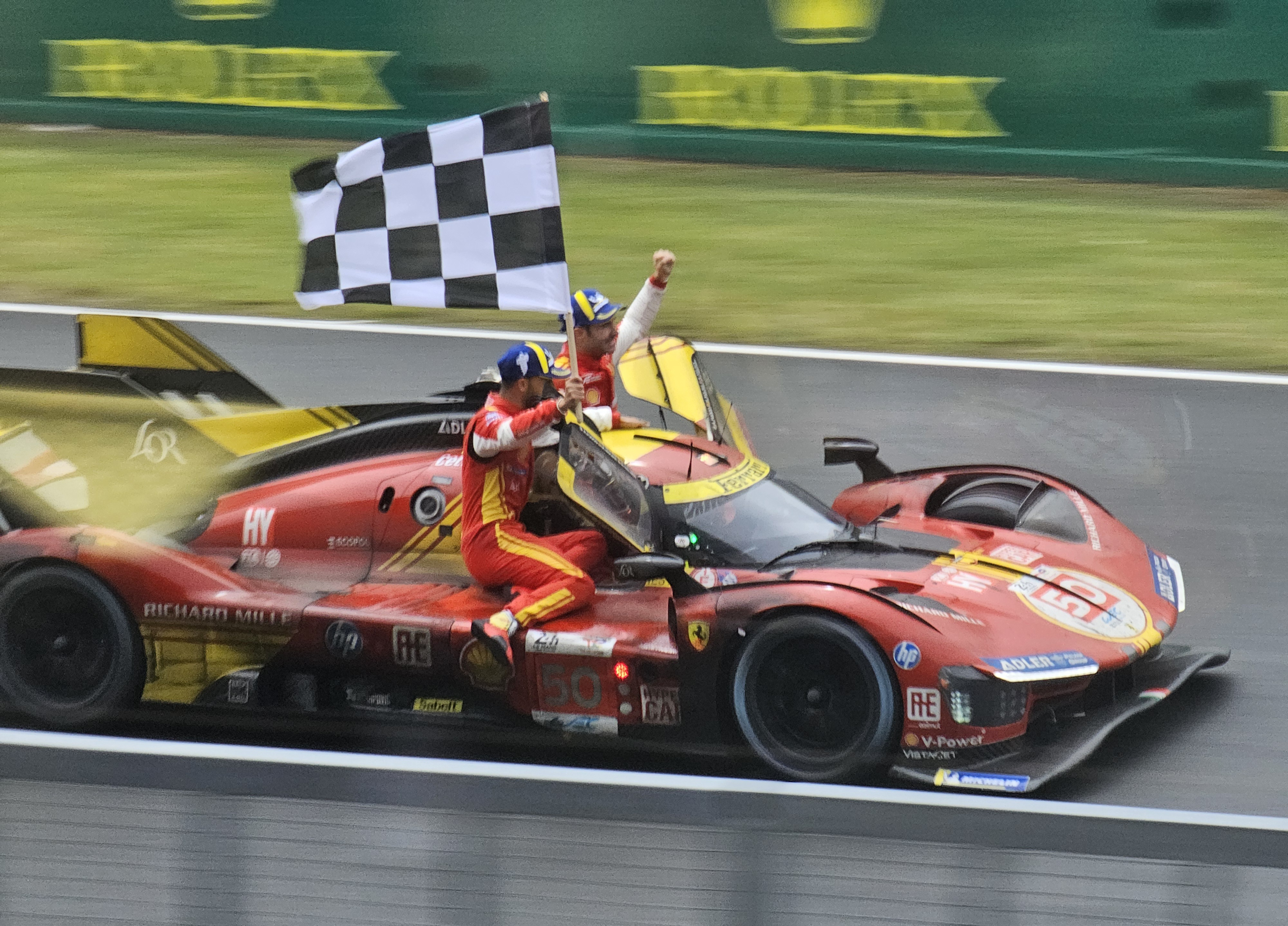
The #50 Ferrari 499P being driven towards the pit lane exit after winning the 2024 24 Hours of Le Mans.

Ferrari maintained their lineup for both cars in 2024. AF Corse also entered a non-factory car that year, bringing in Robert Kubica, Robert Shwartzman, and Yifei Ye to drive the #83 car.

The 499P took home two wins that year, going back to back at the 2024 24 Hours of Le Mans with Antonio Fuoco, Miguel Molina, and Nicklas Nielsen in the #50 car, and at the 2024 Lone Star Le Mans with the non-factory #83 car. In both races, the winning 499P narrowly scored its wins holding off Toyota's chasing #7 car. Despite taking home more wins, the car scored less podiums overall, as Porsche grew more competitive and became a title contender with their 963, fighting Ferrari and Toyota at the front for both championships. Ferrari finished the season third in the Manufacturers' Championship, behind Porsche and Toyota.

=== 2025 ===
In the opening race of the 2025 season, the 2025 Qatar Airways Qatar 1812km, Ferrari achieved a historic triple podium, following pole position for Antonio Giovinazzi in the #51 car, with Antonio Fuoco, Miguel Molina and Nicklas Nielsen winning the race in the #50 Ferrari, followed by the #83 Ferrari 499P in second and the #51 Ferrari 499P in third.

In the second race of the season, the 2025 6 Hours of Imola, the #51 Ferrari 499P took pole position with Antonio Giovinazzi, and the victory was again achieved by the #51 Ferrari 499P driven by Antonio Giovinazzi, James Calado and Alessandro Pier Guidi, while the fastest lap was achieved by Antonio Fuoco with the #50 Ferrari 499P. Unfortunately, the race of the #50 Ferrari 499P was affected by the cancellation of Antonio Fuoco's qualifying time due to track limits and by a contact during the race in an overtaking attempt with the #8 Toyota GR010 Hybrid driven by Sébastien Buemi which resulted in the car going off the track and suffering a puncture in the rear tyre of the #50 Ferrari 499P driven by Antonio Fuoco. After returning to the pits and changing the punctured tyre, the #50 Ferrari finished the race in 15th place. On 9 May 2025, at the 2025 6 Hours of Spa-Francorchamps, the #50 Ferrari 499P driven by Antonio Fuoco achieved the Hyperpole, while the following day of the race, the #51 Ferrari 499P driven by James Calado, Antonio Giovinazzi and Alessandro Pier Guidi achieved the victory while the #50 Ferrari 499P achieved the second place. A very important victory that guarantees Ferrari, the record of overall victories at the 6 Hours of Spa-Francorchamps in the endurance championship, with 11 victories surpassing Porsche. Furthermore, the #51 Ferrari 499P also achieved the fastest lap.

Ferrari completed a hat trick of 24 Hours of Le Mans victories with the 499P at the 2025 24 Hours of Le Mans when the #83 customer AF Corse car took victory with Robert Kubica, Yifei Ye, and Phil Hanson at the wheel. Kubica and Ye became the first Le Mans winners from their respective countries, Poland and China. The factory Ferraris finished 3rd and 4th, however the 4th-place finishing #50 was later disqualified due to a technical infringement. Despite mixed results post-Le Mans, Ferrari completed a dominant championship season with the 499P, ending the year occupying the top 3 spots in the standings.

=== 2026 ===
The 499P saw revisions to its aerodynamics following a rule change in the FIA World Endurance Championship requiring all Hypercar competitors to re-homologate their cars using the WindShear wind tunnel in Concord, North Carolina. The car received 60 to 70% smaller front dive planes, a redesigned engine cover, a revised underfloor, and reworked gurney flaps on several areas.

Ferrari secured pole position in the season opener at 2026 6 Hours of Imola, but later fell to 2nd in race, losing out to Toyota. Hoping to secure a fourth consecutive victory in a row at Le Mans, Ferrari's efforts bore no fruit, failing to either win or score a podium at the 24 Hours of Le Mans for the first time with the 499P, with the highest finishing entry concluding the race in 5th. The car would score its only win of the season with #50 at 2026 Lone Star Le Mans after the leading #7 Toyota suffered hydraulic issues in the final 12 minutes of the race. Ferrari would end the season scoring two consecutive 3rd places at 2026 6 Hours of Barcelona and at 2026 6 hours of Monza with #50 and #51 respectively to finish the season 3rd in the manufacturer standings behind both Toyota & BMW. With #51's winless Season marks as the first time a title defending crew fails to win a single race at any category in WEC.

The car is set to make its debut in the inuagural season of the Hypercar class in the 2026–27 Asian Le Mans Series with Cetilar Racing's #47 crew driven by Antonio Fuoco, Roberto Lacorte & Nicola Lacorte, and AF Corse' #90 crew driven by Nicklas Nielsen, Luis Pérez Companc & Yifei Ye.

== Racing results ==
=== Complete World Endurance Championship results ===
(key) Races in bold indicates pole position. Races in italics indicates fastest lap.

Year	Entrants	Class	Drivers	No.	1	2	3	4	5	6	7	8	Points	Pos
2023	Ferrari AF Corse	Hypercar	—N/a	—N/a	SEB	POR	SPA	LMN	MON	FUJ	BHR		161	2nd
2023	Ferrari AF Corse	Hypercar	Antonio Fuoco	50	**3**	2	Ret	**5**	2	4	3		161	2nd
2023	Ferrari AF Corse	Hypercar	Miguel Molina	50	**3**	2	Ret	**5**	2	4	3		161	2nd
2023	Ferrari AF Corse	Hypercar	Nicklas Nielsen	50	**3**	2	Ret	**5**	2	4	3		161	2nd
2023	Ferrari AF Corse	Hypercar	James Calado	51	7	6	3	1	5	5	6		161	2nd
2023	Ferrari AF Corse	Hypercar	Antonio Giovinazzi	51	7	6	3	1	5	5	6		161	2nd
2023	Ferrari AF Corse	Hypercar	Alessandro Pier Guidi	51	7	6	3	1	5	5	6		161	2nd
2024	Ferrari AF Corse	Hypercar	—N/a	—N/a	QAT	IMO	SPA	LMN	SAP	COA	FUJ	BHR	137	3rd
2024	Ferrari AF Corse	Hypercar	Antonio Fuoco	50	6	**4**	3	1	6	3	9	11	137	3rd
2024	Ferrari AF Corse	Hypercar	Miguel Molina	50	6	**4**	3	1	6	3	9	11	137	3rd
2024	Ferrari AF Corse	Hypercar	Nicklas Nielsen	50	6	**4**	3	1	6	3	9	11	137	3rd
2024	Ferrari AF Corse	Hypercar	James Calado	51	12	7	4	3	4	**Ret**	Ret	↓14	137	3rd
2024	Ferrari AF Corse	Hypercar	Antonio Giovinazzi	51	12	7	4	3	4	**Ret**	Ret	↓14	137	3rd
2024	Ferrari AF Corse	Hypercar	Alessandro Pier Guidi	51	12	7	4	3	4	**Ret**	Ret	↓14	137	3rd
2024	AF Corse	Hypercar	Robert Kubica	83	4	8	8	Ret	11	1	12	8	149**	3rd**
2024	AF Corse	Hypercar	Robert Shwartzman	83	4	8	8	Ret	11	1	12	8	149**	3rd**
2024	AF Corse	Hypercar	Yifei Ye	83	4	8	8	Ret	11	1	12	8	149**	3rd**
2025	Ferrari AF Corse	Hypercar	—N/a	—N/a	QAT	IMO	SPA	LMN	SAP	COA	FUJ	BHR	245	1st
2025	Ferrari AF Corse	Hypercar	Antonio Fuoco	50	1	15	**2**	DSQ	12	2	12	3	245	1st
2025	Ferrari AF Corse	Hypercar	Miguel Molina	50	1	15	**2**	DSQ	12	2	12	3	245	1st
2025	Ferrari AF Corse	Hypercar	Nicklas Nielsen	50	1	15	**2**	DSQ	12	2	12	3	245	1st
2025	Ferrari AF Corse	Hypercar	James Calado	51	**3**	**1**	1	3	11	5	15	4	245	1st
2025	Ferrari AF Corse	Hypercar	Antonio Giovinazzi	51	**3**	**1**	1	3	11	5	15	4	245	1st
2025	Ferrari AF Corse	Hypercar	Alessandro Pier Guidi	51	**3**	**1**	1	3	11	5	15	4	245	1st
2025	AF Corse	Hypercar	Phil Hanson	83	2	4	15	1	8	**7**	9	5	252**	1st**
2025	AF Corse	Hypercar	Robert Kubica	83	2	4	15	1	8	**7**	9	5	252**	1st**
2025	AF Corse	Hypercar	Yifei Ye	83	2	4	15	1	8	**7**	9	5	252**	1st**
2026	Ferrari AF Corse	Hypercar			IMO	SPA	LMN	SÃO	COA	FUJ	CAT	MNZ	150	3rd
2026	Ferrari AF Corse	Hypercar	Antonio Fuoco	50	6	3	Ret	8	1	Ret	3	**9**	150	3rd
2026	Ferrari AF Corse	Hypercar	Miguel Molina	50	6	3	Ret	8	1	Ret	3	**9**	150	3rd
2026	Ferrari AF Corse	Hypercar	Nicklas Nielsen	50	6	3	Ret	8	1	Ret	3	**9**	150	3rd
2026	Ferrari AF Corse	Hypercar	James Calado	51	**2**	Ret	5	2	**11**	10	15	3	150	3rd
2026	Ferrari AF Corse	Hypercar	Antonio Giovinazzi	51	**2**	Ret	5	2	**11**	10	15	3	150	3rd
2026	Ferrari AF Corse	Hypercar	Alessandro Pier Guidi	51	**2**	Ret	5	2	**11**	10	15	3	150	3rd
2026	AF Corse	Hypercar	Phil Hanson	83	10	6	7	5	13	12	5	6	49***	14th***
2026	AF Corse	Hypercar	Robert Kubica	83	10	6	7	5	13	12	5	6	49***	14th***
2026	AF Corse	Hypercar	Yifei Ye	83	10	6	7	5	13	12	5	6	49***	14th***

↓ Penalized from 2nd to 14th position.

* Season in progress.

** Points and position shown are for the FIA World Cup for Hypercar Teams.

*** Points and position shown are for the Hypercar World Endurance Drivers' Championship.

=== Complete Asian Le Mans Series results ===
(key) Races in bold indicates pole position. Races in italics indicates fastest lap.

Year	Entrants	Class	Drivers	No.	1	2	3	4	5	6	Points	Pos
2026–27	Cetilar Racing	Hypercar	—N/a	—N/a	LEC 1	LEC 2	JER 1	JER 2	POR 1	POR 2	—N/a	—N/a
2026–27	Cetilar Racing	Hypercar	Antonio Fuoco	47	**2**	2					37	2nd*
2026–27	Cetilar Racing	Hypercar	Nicola Lacorte	47	**2**	2					37	2nd*
2026–27	Cetilar Racing	Hypercar	Roberto Lacorte	47	**2**	2					37	2nd*
2026–27	AF Corse	Hypercar	Nicklas Nielsen	90	1	**1**					51	1st*
2026–27	AF Corse	Hypercar	Luis Pérez Companc	90	1	**1**					51	1st*
2026–27	AF Corse	Hypercar	Yifei Ye	90	1	**1**					51	1st*

=== Race Victories ===
Year	Series	Race	Track	Car #	Team	Category
2023	WEC	24 Hours of Le Mans	(France) Circuit de la Sarthe	51	(Italy) Ferrari AF Corse	Hypercar
2024	WEC	24 Hours of Le Mans	(France) Circuit de la Sarthe	50	(Italy) Ferrari AF Corse	Hypercar
2024	WEC	Lone Star Le Mans	(United States) Circuit of the Americas	83	(Italy) AF Corse	Hypercar
2025	WEC	Qatar 1812 km	(Qatar) Lusail International Circuit	50	(Italy) Ferrari AF Corse	Hypercar
2025	WEC	6 Hours of Imola	(Italy) Imola Circuit	51	(Italy) Ferrari AF Corse	Hypercar
2025	WEC	6 Hours of Spa-Francorchamps	(Belgium) Circuit de Spa-Francorchamps	51	(Italy) Ferrari AF Corse	Hypercar
2025	WEC	24 Hours of Le Mans	(France) Circuit de la Sarthe	83	(Italy) AF Corse	Hypercar
2026	WEC	Lone Star Le Mans	(United States) Circuit of the Americas	50	(Italy) Ferrari AF Corse	Hypercar
2026-27	ALMS	4 Hours of Le Castellet 1	(France) Circuit Paul Ricard	90	(Italy) AF Corse	Hypercar
2026-27	ALMS	4 Hours of Le Castellet 2	(France) Circuit Paul Ricard	90	(Italy) AF Corse	Hypercar
