= 2024 Lone Star Le Mans =

Sports car endurance race

(United States) Lone Star Le Mans
Event information
- Round 6 of 8 in the 2024 FIA World Endurance Championship
- Date: September 1 2024
- Location: Austin, Texas
- Venue: Circuit of the Americas
- Duration: 6 hours

Results
- Laps completed: 183
- Distance (km): 1008.582
- Distance (miles): 626.704
- Hypercar

Pole position
- Time: 1:50.390
- Team: (Italy) Ferrari AF Corse
- Drivers: (Italy) Antonio Giovinazzi

Winners
- Team: (Italy) AF Corse
- Drivers: (Poland) Robert Kubica (China) Ye Yifei (Israel) Robert Shwartzman
- LMGT3

Winners
- Team: (United States) Heart of Racing
- Drivers: (United States) Ian James (Italy) Daniel Mancinelli (Spain) Alex Riberas

The 2024 Lone Star Le Mans was an endurance sportscar racing event held on September 1, 2024, as the sixth of eight rounds of the 2024 FIA World Endurance Championship. It was the seventh running of the event as part of the World Endurance Championship, and the first running of the event since 2020.

== Background ==
The event was announced on June 9, 2023, during the 2023 24 Hours of Le Mans weekend, replacing the previously run 1000 Miles of Sebring as the contract with IMSA for an event at Sebring running as a double-header with the 12 Hours of Sebring expired in 2023.

== Entry list ==
36 cars entered the race: 18 in Hypercar and 18 in LMGT3. Isotta Fraschini, who previously competed in the Hypercar category, withdrew from the championship prior to the race following disputes with Duqueine Team.

== Schedule ==
Date	Time (local: CDT)	Event
Friday, August 30	12:40	Free Practice 1
Friday, August 30	17:10	Free Practice 2
Saturday, August 31	11:00	Free Practice 3
Saturday, August 31	15:00	Qualifying - LMGT3
Saturday, August 31	15:20	Hyperpole - LMGT3
Saturday, August 31	15:40	Qualifying - Hypercar
Saturday, August 31	16:00	Hyperpole - Hypercar
Sunday, September 1	13:00	Race

== Practice ==
Three practice sessions were held: two were held on Friday, and one on Saturday. The sessions on Friday morning and Friday afternoon lasted 90 minutes, and the session on Saturday morning lasted 60 minutes.

=== Practice 1 ===
The first practice session started at 12:40 CDT on Friday. Matt Campbell topped the session in the No. 5 Porsche Penske Motorsport entry, with a lap time of 1:53.574. He was 0.460 seconds quicker than second-placed Robert Kubica in the No. 83 AF Corse entry, and Oliver Rasmussen finished third in the No. 38 Hertz Team Jota Porsche. Alessio Rovera was quickest in the LMGT3 category: he lapped the circuit in 2 minute, 6.263 seconds, in the No. 55 AF Corse Ferrari. He placed ahead of the two Proton Competition Ford Mustangs, with the No. 88 of Dennis Olsen and No. 77 of Ben Barker who scored times of 2:06.475 and 2:06.720 respectively. The session was briefly red-flagged due to a technical issue in Race Control, and was extended by five minutes in compensation.

Class	No.	Entrant	Driver	Time
Hypercar	5	(Germany) Porsche Penske Motorsport	(Australia) Matt Campbell	1:53.574
LMGT3	55	(Italy) AF Corse	(Italy) Alessio Rovera	2:06.253

- Note: Only the fastest car in each class is shown.

=== Practice 2 ===
The second practice session started at 17:10 CDT on Friday, and ended with Antonio Giovinazzi in the No. 51 Ferrari AF Corse on top, with a time of 1:52.268. He was 0.052 seconds quicker than second-placed Antonio Fuoco in the sister No. 50 Ferrari. Third-quickest was Robin Frijns in the No. 20 BMW M Team WRT; he was 0.115 seconds slower than Giovinazzi. The No. 82 TF Sport Corvette of Daniel Juncadella was quickest in LMGT3: Juncadella lapped the circuit in 2 minutes, 5.630 seconds. He was 0.043 seconds quicker than the No. 55 Ferrari of Rovera in second, with Davide Rigon rounding out the top three in the sister No. 54 Ferrari. The session saw one stoppage, when the No. 20 BMW with Sheldon van der Linde behind the wheel suddenly stopped with 46 minutes to go.

Class	No.	Entrant	Driver	Time
Hypercar	51	(Italy) Ferrari AF Corse	(Italy) Antonio Giovinazzi	1:52.268
LMGT3	82	(United Kingdom) TF Sport	(Spain) Daniel Juncadella	2:05.630

- Note: Only the fastest car in each class is shown.

=== Final practice ===
The third and final practice session started at 11:00 CDT on Saturday. Alex Lynn was quickest in the No. 2 Cadillac Racing entry, with a lap time of 1:51.471. He was 0.040 seconds quicker than Fuoco in the No. 50 Ferrari in second place, with Kamui Kobayashi rounding out the top three in the No. 7 Toyota Gazoo Racing entry. LMGT3 was once again led by Juncadella in the No. 82 Corvette, with a lap time of 2:05.178. His lap time was 0.173 seconds quicker than the lap time of Charlie Eastwood in the No. 81 Corvette, whilst Rigon was third in the No. 54 Ferrari, 0.364 seconds slower than Juncadella.

Class	No.	Entrant	Driver	Time
Hypercar	2	(United States) Cadillac Racing	(United Kingdom) Alex Lynn	1:51.471
LMGT3	82	(United Kingdom) TF Sport	(Spain) Daniel Juncadella	2:05.178

- Note: Only the fastest car in each class is shown.

== Qualifying ==
=== Qualifying results ===
Pole position winners in each class are marked in bold.

Pos	Class	No.	Entrant	Qualifying	Hyperpole	Grid
1	**Hypercar**	**51**	**(Italy) Ferrari AF Corse**	**1:50.734**	**1:50.390**	1
2	Hypercar	83	(Italy) AF Corse	1:51.233	1:50.667	2
3	Hypercar	2	(United States) Cadillac Racing	1:51.073	1:50.680	3
4	Hypercar	35	(France) Alpine Endurance Team	1:51.318	1:50.751	4
5	Hypercar	50	(Italy) Ferrari AF Corse	1:51.059	1:50.818	5
6	Hypercar	5	(Germany) Porsche Penske Motorsport	1:51.368	1:50.874	6
7	Hypercar	20	(Belgium) BMW M Team WRT	1:51.445	1:50.882	7
8	Hypercar	15	(Belgium) BMW M Team WRT	1:51.379	1:50.938	8
9	Hypercar	7	(Japan) Toyota Gazoo Racing	1:51.389	1:50.951	9
10	Hypercar	12	(United Kingdom) Hertz Team Jota	1:51.639	1:51.532	10
11	Hypercar	93	(France) Peugeot TotalEnergies	1:51.659		11
12	Hypercar	8	(Japan) Toyota Gazoo Racing	1:51.720		12
13	Hypercar	36	(France) Alpine Endurance Team	1:51.969		13
14	Hypercar	6	(Germany) Porsche Penske Motorsport	1:51.984		14
15	Hypercar	94	(France) Peugeot TotalEnergies	1:52.081		15
16	Hypercar	99	(Germany) Proton Competition	1:52.225		16
17	Hypercar	38	(United Kingdom) Hertz Team Jota	1:52.320		17
18	Hypercar	63	(Italy) Lamborghini Iron Lynx	1:52.426		18
19	**LMGT3**	**27**	**(United States) Heart of Racing Team**	**2:06.146**	**2:05.587**	19
20	LMGT3	85	(Italy) Iron Dames	2:06.009	2:05.759	20
21	LMGT3	55	(Italy) Vista AF Corse	2:06.356	2:06.001	21
22	LMGT3	92	(Lithuania) Manthey PureRxcing	2:06.414	2:06.176	22
23	LMGT3	81	(United Kingdom) TF Sport	2:06.256	2:06.287	23
24	LMGT3	54	(Italy) Vista AF Corse	2:06.972	2:06.312	24
25	LMGT3	59	(United Kingdom) United Autosports	2:07.025	2:06.521	25
26	LMGT3	777	(Japan) D'station Racing	2:06.818	2:06.609	26
27	LMGT3	88	(Germany) Proton Competition	2:06.633	2:06.650	27
28	LMGT3	31	(Belgium) Team WRT	2:07.108	2:07.483	28
29	LMGT3	95	(United Kingdom) United Autosports	2:07.112		29
30	LMGT3	78	(France) Akkodis ASP Team	2:07.184		30
31	LMGT3	82	(United Kingdom) TF Sport	2:07.328		31
32	LMGT3	77	(Germany) Proton Competition	2:07.431		32
33	LMGT3	46	(Belgium) Team WRT	2:07.459		33
34	LMGT3	91	(Germany) Manthey EMA	2:07.691		34
35	LMGT3	87	(France) Akkodis ASP Team	2:08.153		35
36	LMGT3	60	(Italy) Iron Lynx	2:09.622		36

== Race ==
=== Race results ===
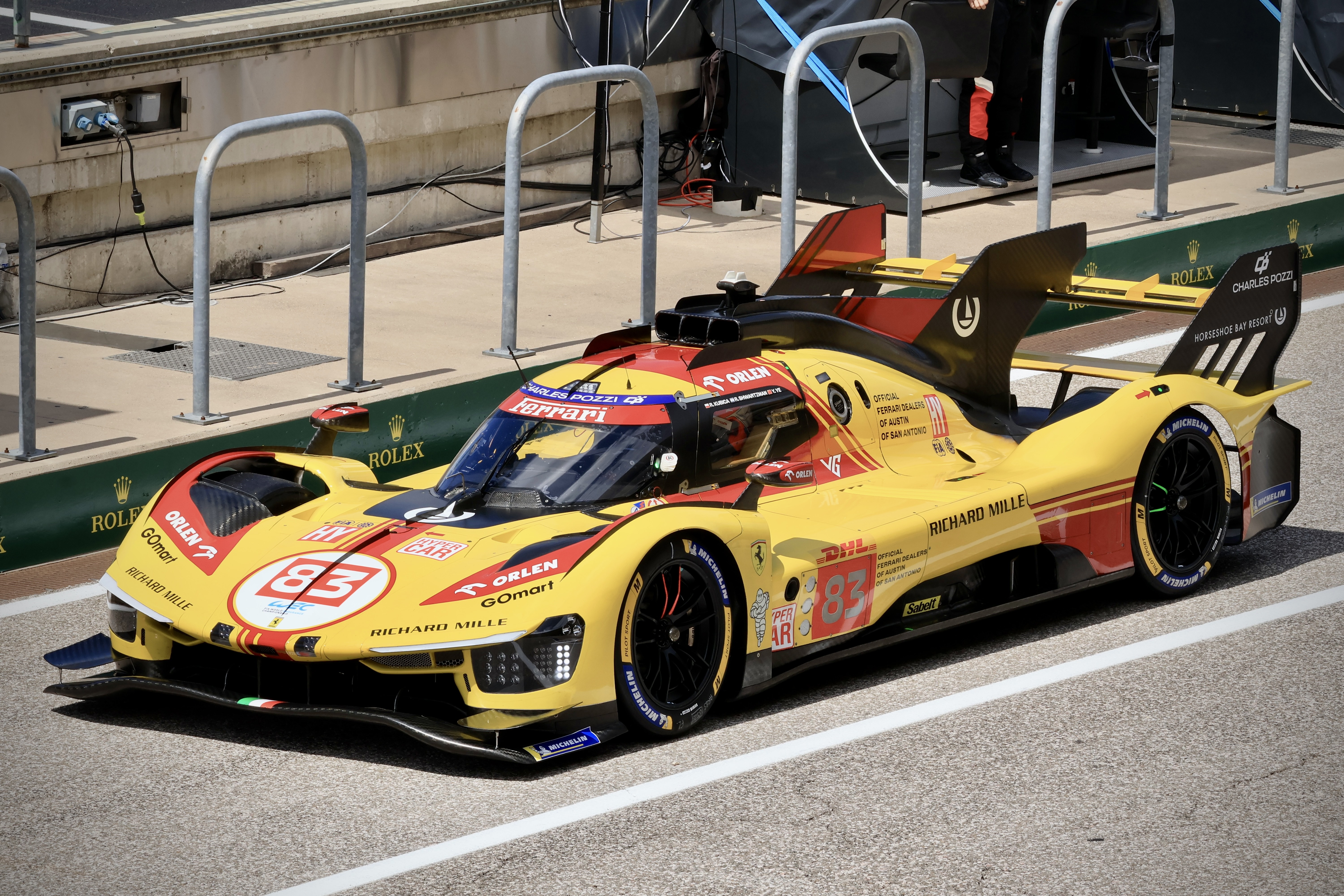
The race-winning No. 83 Ferrari 499P belonging to AF Corse

The minimum number of laps for classification (70% of overall winning car's distance) was 128 laps. Class winners are in bold and ‡.

Pos	Class	No	Team	Drivers	Chassis	Tyre	Laps	Time/Retired
Pos	Class	No	Team	Drivers	Engine	Tyre	Laps	Time/Retired
1	**Hypercar**	**83**	**(Italy) AF Corse**	**(Poland) Robert Kubica (Israel) Robert Shwartzman (China) Yifei Ye**	**Ferrari 499P**	M	**183**	**6:00:23.755‡**
1	**Hypercar**	**83**	**(Italy) AF Corse**	**(Poland) Robert Kubica (Israel) Robert Shwartzman (China) Yifei Ye**	**Ferrari F163 3.0 L Turbo V6**	M	**183**	**6:00:23.755‡**
2	Hypercar	7	(Japan) Toyota Gazoo Racing	(United Kingdom) Mike Conway (Japan) Kamui Kobayashi (Netherlands) Nyck de Vries	Toyota GR010 Hybrid	M	183	+1.780
2	Hypercar	7	(Japan) Toyota Gazoo Racing	(United Kingdom) Mike Conway (Japan) Kamui Kobayashi (Netherlands) Nyck de Vries	Toyota H8909 3.5 L Turbo V6	M	183	+1.780
3	Hypercar	50	(Italy) Ferrari AF Corse	(Italy) Antonio Fuoco (Spain) Miguel Molina (Denmark) Nicklas Nielsen	Ferrari 499P	M	183	+26.282
3	Hypercar	50	(Italy) Ferrari AF Corse	(Italy) Antonio Fuoco (Spain) Miguel Molina (Denmark) Nicklas Nielsen	Ferrari F163 3.0 L Turbo V6	M	183	+26.282
4	Hypercar	2	(United States) Cadillac Racing	(New Zealand) Earl Bamber (United Kingdom) Alex Lynn	Cadillac V-Series.R	M	183	+46.924
4	Hypercar	2	(United States) Cadillac Racing	(New Zealand) Earl Bamber (United Kingdom) Alex Lynn	Cadillac LMC55R 5.5 L V8	M	183	+46.924
5	Hypercar	35	(France) Alpine Endurance Team	(France) Paul-Loup Chatin (Austria) Ferdinand Habsburg (France) Charles Milesi	Alpine A424	M	183	+1:10.513
5	Hypercar	35	(France) Alpine Endurance Team	(France) Paul-Loup Chatin (Austria) Ferdinand Habsburg (France) Charles Milesi	Alpine V634 3.4 L Turbo V6	M	183	+1:10.513
6	Hypercar	6	(Germany) Porsche Penske Motorsport	(France) Kévin Estre (Germany) André Lotterer (Belgium) Laurens Vanthoor	Porsche 963	M	183	+1:36.873
6	Hypercar	6	(Germany) Porsche Penske Motorsport	(France) Kévin Estre (Germany) André Lotterer (Belgium) Laurens Vanthoor	Porsche 9RD 4.6 L Turbo V8	M	183	+1:36.873
7	Hypercar	5	(Germany) Porsche Penske Motorsport	(Australia) Matt Campbell (Denmark) Michael Christensen (France) Frédéric Makowiecki	Porsche 963	M	183	+1:41.494
7	Hypercar	5	(Germany) Porsche Penske Motorsport	(Australia) Matt Campbell (Denmark) Michael Christensen (France) Frédéric Makowiecki	Porsche 9RD 4.6 L Turbo V8	M	183	+1:41.494
8	Hypercar	15	(Belgium) BMW M Team WRT	(Switzerland) Raffaele Marciello (Belgium) Dries Vanthoor (Germany) Marco Wittmann	BMW M Hybrid V8	M	182	+1 Lap
8	Hypercar	15	(Belgium) BMW M Team WRT	(Switzerland) Raffaele Marciello (Belgium) Dries Vanthoor (Germany) Marco Wittmann	BMW P66/3 4.0 L Turbo V8	M	182	+1 Lap
9	Hypercar	36	(France) Alpine Endurance Team	(France) Nicolas Lapierre (Germany) Mick Schumacher (France) Matthieu Vaxivière	Alpine A424	M	182	+1 Lap
9	Hypercar	36	(France) Alpine Endurance Team	(France) Nicolas Lapierre (Germany) Mick Schumacher (France) Matthieu Vaxivière	Alpine V634 3.4 L Turbo V6	M	182	+1 Lap
10	Hypercar	38	(United Kingdom) Hertz Team Jota	(United Kingdom) Jenson Button (United Kingdom) Phil Hanson (Denmark) Oliver Rasmussen	Porsche 963	M	182	+1 Lap
10	Hypercar	38	(United Kingdom) Hertz Team Jota	(United Kingdom) Jenson Button (United Kingdom) Phil Hanson (Denmark) Oliver Rasmussen	Porsche 9RD 4.6 L Turbo V8	M	182	+1 Lap
11	Hypercar	99	(Germany) Proton Competition	(France) Julien Andlauer (Switzerland) Neel Jani (United Kingdom) Harry Tincknell	Porsche 963	M	182	+1 Lap
11	Hypercar	99	(Germany) Proton Competition	(France) Julien Andlauer (Switzerland) Neel Jani (United Kingdom) Harry Tincknell	Porsche 9RD 4.6 L Turbo V8	M	182	+1 Lap
12	Hypercar	93	(France) Peugeot TotalEnergies	(Denmark) Mikkel Jensen (Switzerland) Nico Müller (France) Jean-Éric Vergne	Peugeot 9X8	M	182	+1 Lap
12	Hypercar	93	(France) Peugeot TotalEnergies	(Denmark) Mikkel Jensen (Switzerland) Nico Müller (France) Jean-Éric Vergne	Peugeot X6H 2.6 L Turbo V6	M	182	+1 Lap
13	Hypercar	20	(Belgium) BMW M Team WRT	(Netherlands) Robin Frijns (Germany) René Rast (South Africa) Sheldon van der Linde	BMW M Hybrid V8	M	182	+1 Lap
13	Hypercar	20	(Belgium) BMW M Team WRT	(Netherlands) Robin Frijns (Germany) René Rast (South Africa) Sheldon van der Linde	BMW P66/3 4.0 L Turbo V8	M	182	+1 Lap
14	Hypercar	63	(Italy) Lamborghini Iron Lynx	(Italy) Mirko Bortolotti; Daniil Kvyat (Italy) Edoardo Mortara	Lamborghini SC63	M	182	+1 Lap
14	Hypercar	63	(Italy) Lamborghini Iron Lynx	(Italy) Mirko Bortolotti; Daniil Kvyat (Italy) Edoardo Mortara	Lamborghini 3.8 L Turbo V8	M	182	+1 Lap
15	Hypercar	8	(Japan) Toyota Gazoo Racing	(Switzerland) Sébastien Buemi (New Zealand) Brendon Hartley (Japan) Ryo Hirakawa	Toyota GR010 Hybrid	M	181	+2 Laps
15	Hypercar	8	(Japan) Toyota Gazoo Racing	(Switzerland) Sébastien Buemi (New Zealand) Brendon Hartley (Japan) Ryo Hirakawa	Toyota H8909 3.5 L Turbo V6	M	181	+2 Laps
16	**LMGT3**	**27**	**(United States) Heart of Racing Team**	**(United Kingdom) Ian James (Italy) Daniel Mancinelli (Spain) Alex Riberas**	**Aston Martin Vantage AMR GT3 Evo**	G	**164**	**+19 Laps‡**
16	**LMGT3**	**27**	**(United States) Heart of Racing Team**	**(United Kingdom) Ian James (Italy) Daniel Mancinelli (Spain) Alex Riberas**	**Aston Martin M177 4.0 L Turbo V8**	G	**164**	**+19 Laps‡**
17	LMGT3	92	(Lithuania) Manthey PureRxcing	(Austria) Klaus Bachler (Saint Kitts and Nevis) Alex Malykhin (Germany) Joel Sturm	Porsche 911 GT3 R (992)	G	164	+19 Laps
17	LMGT3	92	(Lithuania) Manthey PureRxcing	(Austria) Klaus Bachler (Saint Kitts and Nevis) Alex Malykhin (Germany) Joel Sturm	Porsche M97/80 4.2 L Flat-6	G	164	+19 Laps
18	LMGT3	91	(Germany) Manthey EMA	(Austria) Richard Lietz (Netherlands) Morris Schuring (Australia) Yasser Shahin	Porsche 911 GT3 R (992)	G	164	+19 Laps
18	LMGT3	91	(Germany) Manthey EMA	(Austria) Richard Lietz (Netherlands) Morris Schuring (Australia) Yasser Shahin	Porsche M97/80 4.2 L Flat-6	G	164	+19 Laps
19	LMGT3	59	(United Kingdom) United Autosports	(Brazil) Nicolas Costa (United Kingdom) James Cottingham (Switzerland) Grégoire Saucy	McLaren 720S GT3 Evo	G	164	+19 Laps
19	LMGT3	59	(United Kingdom) United Autosports	(Brazil) Nicolas Costa (United Kingdom) James Cottingham (Switzerland) Grégoire Saucy	McLaren M840T 4.0 L Turbo V8	G	164	+19 Laps
20	LMGT3	31	(Belgium) Team WRT	(Brazil) Augusto Farfus (Indonesia) Sean Gelael (United Kingdom) Darren Leung	BMW M4 GT3	G	164	+19 Laps
20	LMGT3	31	(Belgium) Team WRT	(Brazil) Augusto Farfus (Indonesia) Sean Gelael (United Kingdom) Darren Leung	BMW P58 3.0 L Turbo I6	G	164	+19 Laps
21	LMGT3	77	(Germany) Proton Competition	(United Kingdom) Ben Barker (United States) Ryan Hardwick (Canada) Zacharie Robichon	Ford Mustang GT3	G	163	+20 Laps
21	LMGT3	77	(Germany) Proton Competition	(United Kingdom) Ben Barker (United States) Ryan Hardwick (Canada) Zacharie Robichon	Ford Coyote 5.4 L V8	G	163	+20 Laps
22	LMGT3	95	(United Kingdom) United Autosports	(United Kingdom) Josh Caygill (Chile) Nico Pino (Japan) Marino Sato	McLaren 720S GT3 Evo	G	163	+20 Laps
22	LMGT3	95	(United Kingdom) United Autosports	(United Kingdom) Josh Caygill (Chile) Nico Pino (Japan) Marino Sato	McLaren M840T 4.0 L Turbo V8	G	163	+20 Laps
23	LMGT3	82	(United Kingdom) TF Sport	(France) Sébastien Baud (Spain) Daniel Juncadella (Japan) Hiroshi Koizumi	Chevrolet Corvette Z06 GT3.R	G	163	+20 Laps
23	LMGT3	82	(United Kingdom) TF Sport	(France) Sébastien Baud (Spain) Daniel Juncadella (Japan) Hiroshi Koizumi	Chevrolet LT6.R 5.5 L V8	G	163	+20 Laps
24	LMGT3	78	(France) Akkodis ASP Team	(South Africa) Kelvin van der Linde (France) Arnold Robin (Austria) Clemens Schmid	Lexus RC F GT3	G	163	+20 Laps
24	LMGT3	78	(France) Akkodis ASP Team	(South Africa) Kelvin van der Linde (France) Arnold Robin (Austria) Clemens Schmid	Lexus 2UR-GSE 5.4 L V8	G	163	+20 Laps
25	LMGT3	55	(Italy) Vista AF Corse	(France) François Hériau (United States) Simon Mann (Italy) Alessio Rovera	Ferrari 296 GT3	G	163	+20 Laps
25	LMGT3	55	(Italy) Vista AF Corse	(France) François Hériau (United States) Simon Mann (Italy) Alessio Rovera	Ferrari F163CE 3.0 L Turbo V6	G	163	+20 Laps
26	LMGT3	87	(France) Akkodis ASP Team	(Japan) Takeshi Kimura (Argentina) José María López (France) Esteban Masson	Lexus RC F GT3	G	162	+21 Laps
26	LMGT3	87	(France) Akkodis ASP Team	(Japan) Takeshi Kimura (Argentina) José María López (France) Esteban Masson	Lexus 2UR-GSE 5.4 L V8	G	162	+21 Laps
27	LMGT3	60	(Italy) Iron Lynx	(Italy) Matteo Cressoni (France) Franck Perera (Italy) Claudio Schiavoni	Lamborghini Huracán GT3 Evo 2	G	162	+21 Laps
27	LMGT3	60	(Italy) Iron Lynx	(Italy) Matteo Cressoni (France) Franck Perera (Italy) Claudio Schiavoni	Lamborghini DGF 5.2 L V10	G	162	+21 Laps
28	LMGT3	85	(Italy) Iron Dames	(Belgium) Sarah Bovy (Switzerland) Rahel Frey (Denmark) Michelle Gatting	Lamborghini Huracán GT3 Evo 2	G	160	+23 Laps
28	LMGT3	85	(Italy) Iron Dames	(Belgium) Sarah Bovy (Switzerland) Rahel Frey (Denmark) Michelle Gatting	Lamborghini DGF 5.2 L V10	G	160	+23 Laps
NC	LMGT3	46	(Belgium) Team WRT	(Oman) Ahmad Al Harthy (Belgium) Maxime Martin (Italy) Valentino Rossi	BMW M4 GT3	G	155	Not classified
NC	LMGT3	46	(Belgium) Team WRT	(Oman) Ahmad Al Harthy (Belgium) Maxime Martin (Italy) Valentino Rossi	BMW P58 3.0 L Turbo I6	G	155	Not classified
NC	LMGT3	88	(Germany) Proton Competition	(United States) Ben Keating (Norway) Dennis Olsen (Denmark) Mikkel O. Pedersen	Ford Mustang GT3	G	146	Not classified
NC	LMGT3	88	(Germany) Proton Competition	(United States) Ben Keating (Norway) Dennis Olsen (Denmark) Mikkel O. Pedersen	Ford Coyote 5.4 L V8	G	146	Not classified
NC	Hypercar	12	(United Kingdom) Hertz Team Jota	(United Kingdom) Callum Ilott (France) Norman Nato (United Kingdom) Will Stevens	Porsche 963	M	71	Not classified
NC	Hypercar	12	(United Kingdom) Hertz Team Jota	(United Kingdom) Callum Ilott (France) Norman Nato (United Kingdom) Will Stevens	Porsche 9RD 4.6 L Turbo V8	M	71	Not classified
DNF	LMGT3	81	(United Kingdom) TF Sport	(Angola) Rui Andrade (Republic of Ireland) Charlie Eastwood (Belgium) Tom van Rompuy	Chevrolet Corvette Z06 GT3.R	G	137	Did not finish
DNF	LMGT3	81	(United Kingdom) TF Sport	(Angola) Rui Andrade (Republic of Ireland) Charlie Eastwood (Belgium) Tom van Rompuy	Chevrolet LT6.R 5.5 L V8	G	137	Did not finish
DNF	Hypercar	94	(France) Peugeot TotalEnergies	(United Kingdom) Paul di Resta (France) Loïc Duval (Belgium) Stoffel Vandoorne	Peugeot 9X8	M	121	Did not finish
DNF	Hypercar	94	(France) Peugeot TotalEnergies	(United Kingdom) Paul di Resta (France) Loïc Duval (Belgium) Stoffel Vandoorne	Peugeot X6H 2.6 L Turbo V6	M	121	Did not finish
DNF	LMGT3	777	(Japan) D'station Racing	(France) Erwan Bastard (France) Clément Mateu (Denmark) Marco Sørensen	Aston Martin Vantage AMR GT3 Evo	G	81	Did not finish
DNF	LMGT3	777	(Japan) D'station Racing	(France) Erwan Bastard (France) Clément Mateu (Denmark) Marco Sørensen	Aston Martin M177 4.0 L Turbo V8	G	81	Did not finish
DNF	Hypercar	51	(Italy) Ferrari AF Corse	(United Kingdom) James Calado (Italy) Antonio Giovinazzi (Italy) Alessandro Pier Guidi	Ferrari 499P	M	55	Did not finish
DNF	Hypercar	51	(Italy) Ferrari AF Corse	(United Kingdom) James Calado (Italy) Antonio Giovinazzi (Italy) Alessandro Pier Guidi	Ferrari F163 3.0 L Turbo V6	M	55	Did not finish
DNF	LMGT3	54	(Italy) Vista AF Corse	(Italy) Francesco Castellacci (Switzerland) Thomas Flohr (Italy) Davide Rigon	Ferrari 296 GT3	G	54	Did not finish
DNF	LMGT3	54	(Italy) Vista AF Corse	(Italy) Francesco Castellacci (Switzerland) Thomas Flohr (Italy) Davide Rigon	Ferrari F163CE 3.0 L Turbo V6	G	54	Did not finish

== Official recordings ==
- Free Practice 3 | 6 Hours of COTA on YouTube
- Full Qualifying and Hyperpole | 6 Hours of COTA on YouTube
- Full Race | 6 Hours of COTA on YouTube
