= Antonio Giovinazzi =

Italian racing driver (born 1993)

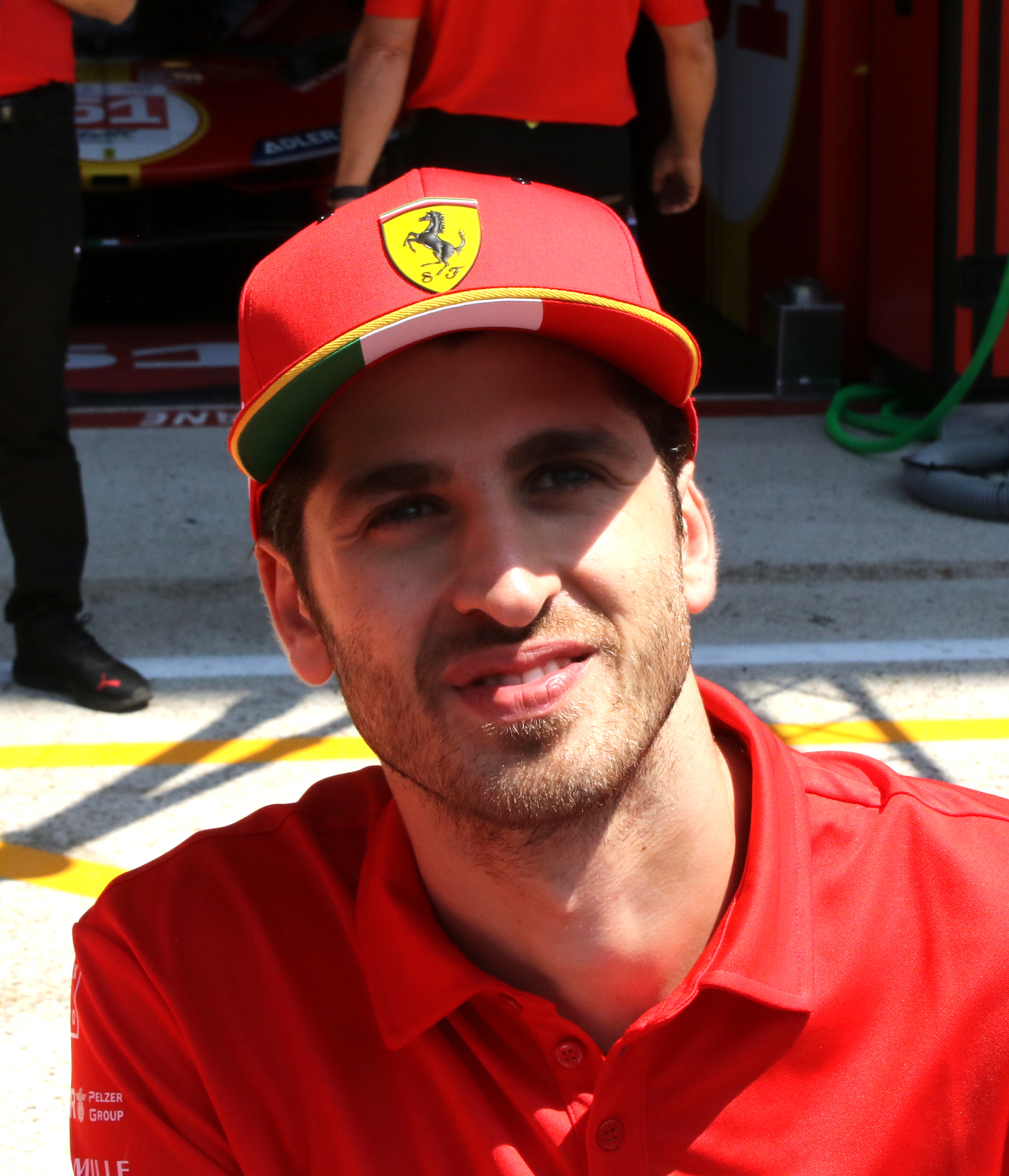
- Giovinazzi at the 2023 24 Hours of Le Mans
- Born: Antonio Maria Giovinazzi; 14 December 1993 (age 32); Martina Franca, Taranto, Italy
- Spouse: Antonella Maraglino (m. 2024)
- Children: 1

FIA World Endurance Championship career
- Debut season: 2016
- Current team: Ferrari AF Corse
- Categorisation: FIA Gold (until 2016); FIA Platinum (2017–)
- Car number: 51
- Former teams: ESM
- Starts: 33
- Championships: 1 (2025)
- Wins: 3
- Podiums: 11
- Poles: 5
- Fastest laps: 0
- Best finish: 1st in 2025 (HY)
- Statistics up to date as of 10 May 2026.

Formula One World Championship career
- Nationality: (Italy) Italian
- Active years: 2017, 2019–2021
- Team(s): Sauber, Alfa Romeo
- Car number: 99 (Note: Giovinazzi selected the number 99 as his personal driver number, per FIA regulations; in 2017, he competed using the standard reserve number 36 for Sauber.)
- Entries: 62 (62 starts)
- Championships: 0
- Wins: 0
- Podiums: 0
- Career points: 21
- Pole positions: 0
- Fastest laps: 0
- First entry: 2017 Australian Grand Prix
- Last entry: 2021 Abu Dhabi Grand Prix

24 Hours of Le Mans career
- Years: 2018, 2023–2025
- Teams: AF Corse, Ferrari
- Best finish: 1st (2023)
- Class wins: 1 (2023)

Previous series
- 2022; 2016; 2015–2016; 2015; 2013–2015; 2013; 2012; 2012: Formula E; GP2 Series; ALMS; DTM; FIA F3 European; British F3; Formula Pilota China; Formula Abarth

Championship titles
- 2015; 2012: Masters of F3; Formula Pilota China

Awards
- 2019: Lorenzo Bandini Trophy
- Website: www.antoniogiovinazzi.com

Antonio Maria Giovinazzi (Italian pronunciation: [anˈtɔːnjo d͡ʒoviˈnatt͡si]; born 14 December 1993) is an Italian racing driver who competes in the FIA World Endurance Championship for Ferrari. Giovinazzi competed in Formula One between 2017 and 2021. (Note: The exact years Giovinazzi competed in Formula One: 2017, 2019–2021.) In endurance racing, Giovinazzi won the FIA World Endurance Championship in 2025 and the 24 Hours of Le Mans in 2023, both with Ferrari.

Born in Martina Franca, Giovinazzi began competitive kart racing aged six, winning several national and international titles. Graduating to junior formulae in 2012, he won his first championship at the Formula Pilota China that year. After finishing runner-up to Jordan King in the 2013 British Formula 3 International Series, Giovinazzi moved to the FIA Formula 3 European Championship in 2014, finishing runner-up to Felix Rosenqvist the following season and winning the Masters of Formula 3. Giovinazzi then debuted in sportscar racing, contesting select rounds of the Deutsche Tourenwagen Masters, the Asian Le Mans Series and the European Le Mans Series. Giovinazzi progressed to the GP2 Series in 2016, finishing runner-up to Pierre Gasly in his rookie season with Prema.

A reserve driver for Sauber, Ferrari and Haas in 2017, Giovinazzi made his Formula One debut for the former at the Australian Grand Prix, replacing an injured Pascal Wehrlein for the opening two rounds of the season. Following another season as a reserve driver for Sauber and Ferrari in 2018, Giovinazzi signed for Sauber—re-branded as Alfa Romeo—as a full-time driver for the 2019 season. He scored his maiden points finish at the Austrian Grand Prix, with a career-best fifth in Brazil. Giovinazzi remained at Alfa Romeo for his 2020 campaign, scoring several points finishes throughout the season. Retaining his seat for 2021, he scored further points in Monaco and Saudi Arabia, before being dropped by Alfa Romeo at the conclusion of the season. Giovinazzi has since remained a reserve driver for Ferrari, a role he has held continuously since 2017.

Giovinazzi moved to Formula E for the 2021–22 season driving for Dragon, leaving the series after being the only non-scoring driver that season. Joining the Ferrari 499P Hypercar project in its inaugural 2023 season, Giovinazzi won the 24 Hours of Le Mans alongside James Calado and Alessandro Pier Guidi.

== Early and personal life ==
Antonio Maria Giovinazzi was born on 14 December 1993 in Martina Franca, Taranto, Italy. He has one child, a daughter.

== Junior racing career ==
=== Karting ===
Giovinazzi began karting in 2000. In 2006, he became the champion in the Italian National Trophy 60cc and Euro Trophy 60 championships. He was champion of the WSK Master Series in the KF2 class in both 2010 and 2011.

=== Formula Pilota China ===
Giovinazzi began his single seater career by competing in Formula Pilota China in 2012. He finished as the overall champion in his debut season with a total of six wins. He also raced for the BVM team in the last round of the 2012 Formula Abarth season at Monza. Despite winning two races and finishing in second place in one, he did not receive any points since he was a guest driver.

=== Formula Three ===
Giovinazzi competed in the 2013 British Formula Three Championship season with the Double R Racing team, alongside Sean Gelael and Tatiana Calderón. He won two races, at Silverstone and at Spa-Francorchamps, and ended the season as runner-up behind Jordan King. During the season, Giovinazzi entered the 2013 Masters of Formula 3, finishing the race in tenth place.

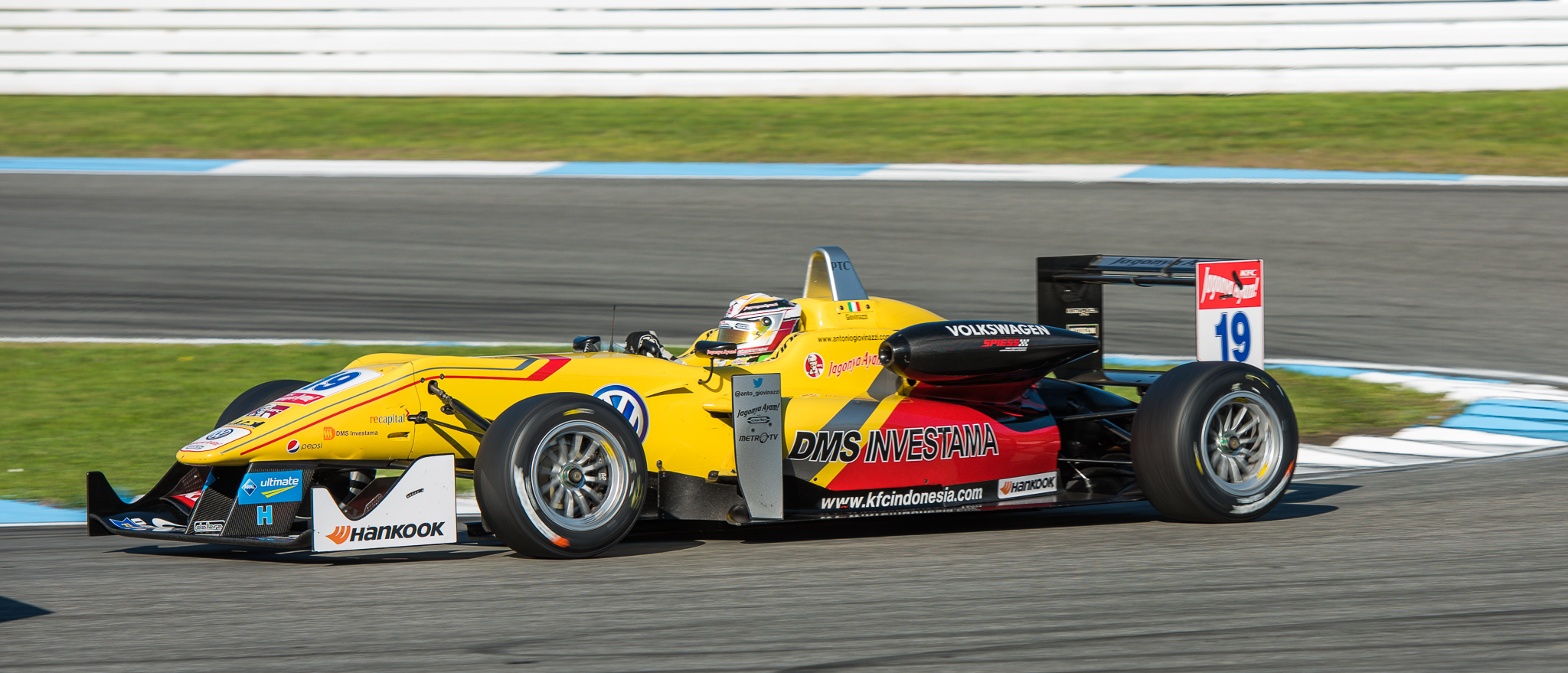
Giovinazzi at the Hockenheimring round of the 2014 FIA Formula 3 European Championship

In 2013, Giovinazzi made his debut in the FIA Formula 3 European Championship with the Double R Racing team. He scored his first points at the fourth round in Brands Hatch, finishing 11th in the first race. His best result of the season was at the final race in Hockenheim, where he finished sixth. Giovinazzi ended the season in 15th place in the championship with 45 points.

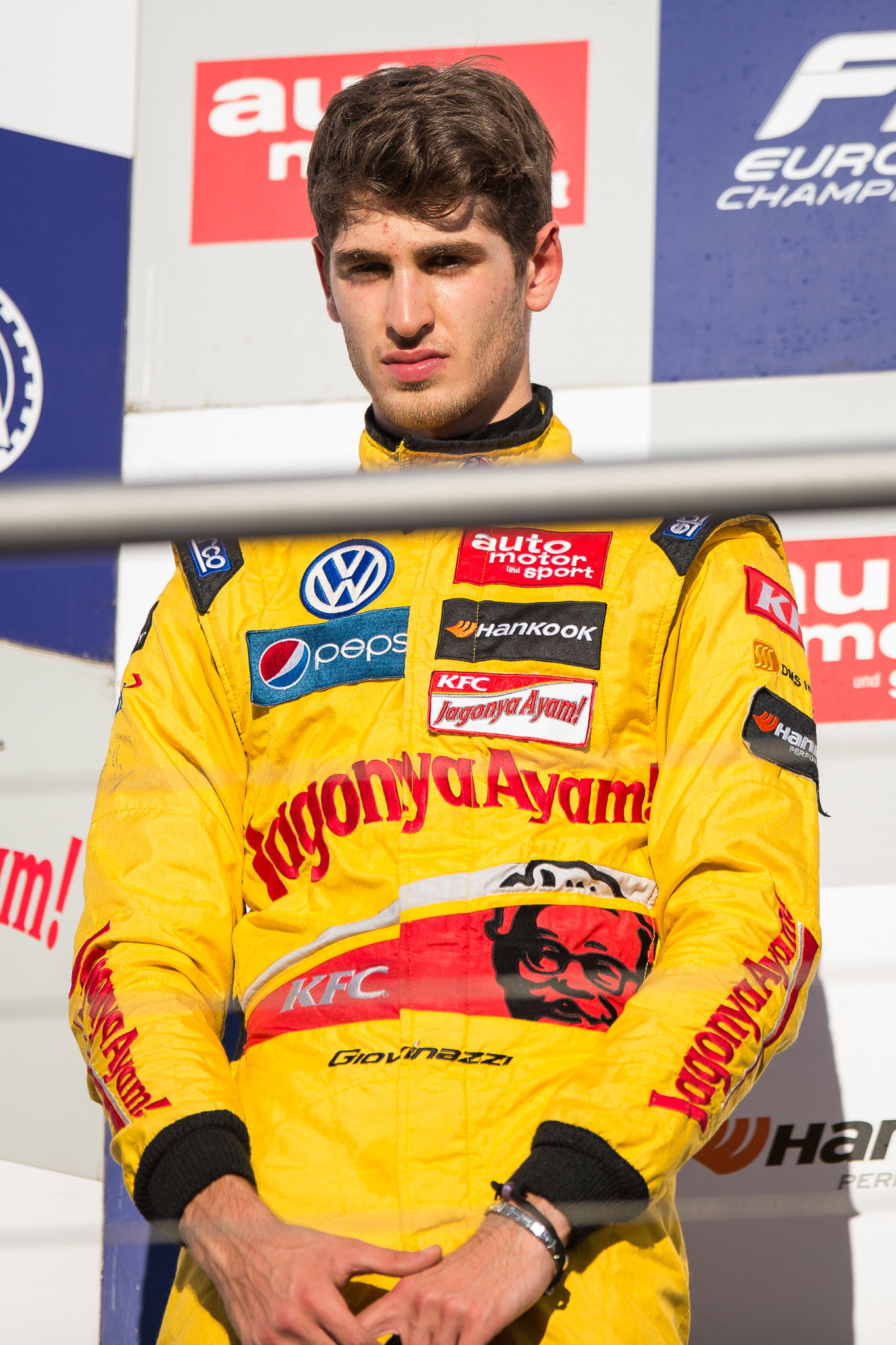
Giovinazzi in 2014

In 2014, Giovinazzi signed with Jagonya Ayam with Carlin to compete in the 2014 FIA Formula 3 European Championship season. His first Formula 3 podium came with a second-place finish in Hockenheim. His first win came from pole position at the Red Bull Ring, before adding another win at the following round at the Nürburgring. He ended the season in sixth place in the standings with 238 points, recording two wins, seven podium finishes, two pole positions and three fastest laps.

Giovinazzi continued in the championship with Jagonya Agam with Carlin in 2015, in a field which included future Formula One competitors Charles Leclerc, Lance Stroll, George Russell and Alexander Albon. He was a championship contender for much of the season, eventually losing out to Felix Rosenqvist. Giovinazzi ended the season as the championship runner-up, with 412.5 points. He recorded six wins, twenty podium finishes, four pole positions and four fastest laps. During the 2015 season, he made his second appearance at the Masters of Formula 3 race, winning the race after starting from second on the grid, and also won the Pau Grand Prix.

After the end of his European Formula 3 season, Giovinazzi entered the non-championship 2015 Macau Grand Prix with Carlin, qualifying in fourth place. In the qualifying race, he caused a multi-car pile up on the first lap after colliding with Daniel Juncadella. Giovinazzi went on to win the qualifying race, but was later handed a 20-second penalty for the incident, demoting him to tenth. At the main event, he recovered to finish in fourth place.

=== GP2 Series ===
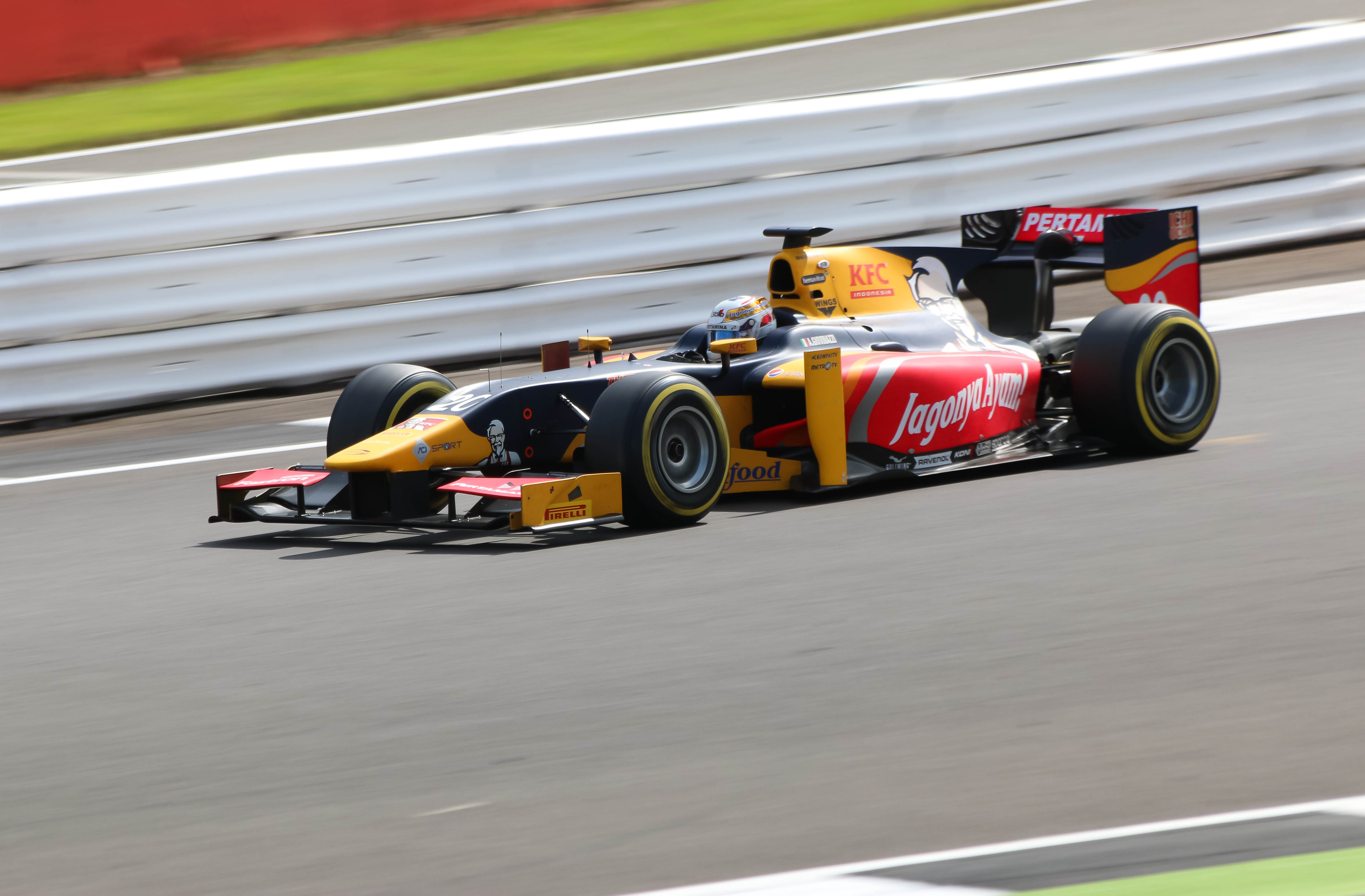
Giovinazzi driving at Silverstone during the 2016 GP2 Season

Giovinazzi joined the series with Prema Powerteam for the 2016 season alongside Red Bull Junior and 2014 Formula Renault 3.5 Series runner-up Pierre Gasly.

After a poor start by finishing outside the points and losing reverse grid pole in the first two rounds, Giovinazzi scored victories in both the feature and sprint races in Baku, becoming the first driver to do 'the double' since Davide Valsecchi in 2012.

Giovinazzi took pole position from his teammate Gasly at Spa, and won the Sprint Race after Gasly had won the feature race on Saturday. At Monza, he took pole position, but was disqualified from the session due to a technical infringement. Despite starting from the back of the grid, he won in the Feature Race after a mix up involving the safety car that worked in his favour.

Giovinazzi took the lead of the championship at Sepang by overtaking Sergey Sirotkin late on for his fifth win of the season. However, Pierre Gasly's victory in the Abu Dhabi feature race meant that Gasly led by twelve points into the final race. Giovinazzi finished the final race ahead of Gasly as Alex Lynn won the race, however, after making a poor start, he was unable to overturn the twelve-point gap, and Gasly won the championship by eight points.

Had Giovinazzi won the championship, he would have been the first rookie champion since Nico Hülkenberg in 2009. He would also have been the last GP2 champion as the series would become FIA Formula 2 Championship for 2017.

== Formula One career ==
On 5 September 2016, it was announced that Giovinazzi would perform simulator work for Scuderia Ferrari. In December, he was confirmed as Ferrari's reserve driver.

=== Sauber/Ferrari/Haas reserve driver (2017–2018) ===
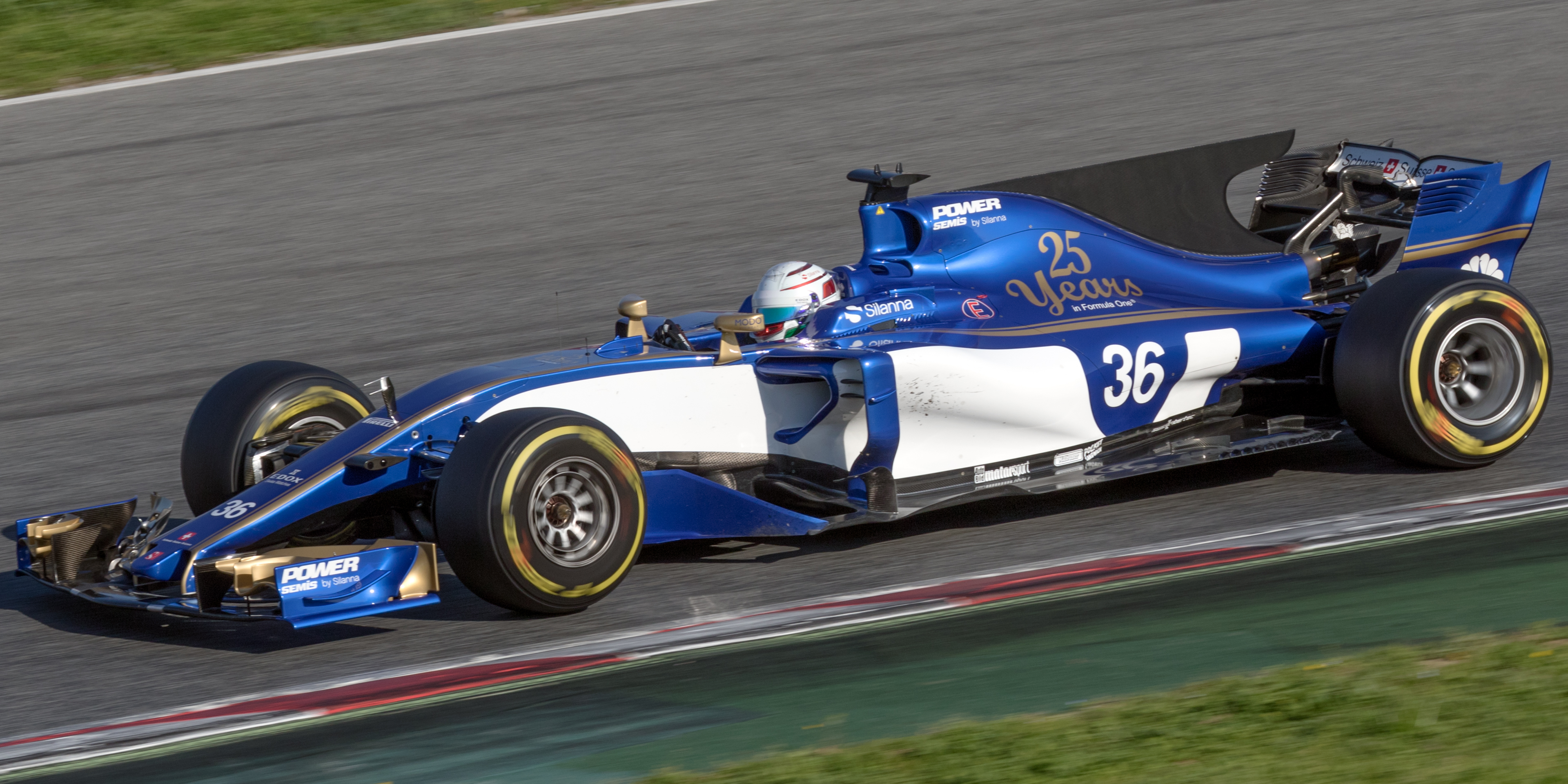
Giovinazzi testing for Sauber in 2017 at Circuit de Barcelona-Catalunya

Giovinazzi participated in pre-season testing for the 2017 season with Sauber. In a similar fashion to his DTM debut two years prior, he substituted for the injured Pascal Wehrlein at the Australian Grand Prix. Wehrlein did not feel fit enough for a complete race distance due to his training deficit as a result of a crash at the 2017 Race of Champions. Giovinazzi finished 12th on his debut. His debut meant he was the first Italian driver to start a Formula One race since Jarno Trulli and Vitantonio Liuzzi at the 2011 Brazilian Grand Prix. Sauber announced that Giovinazzi would again replace Wehrlein for the Chinese Grand Prix, where he crashed out during both qualifying and the race.

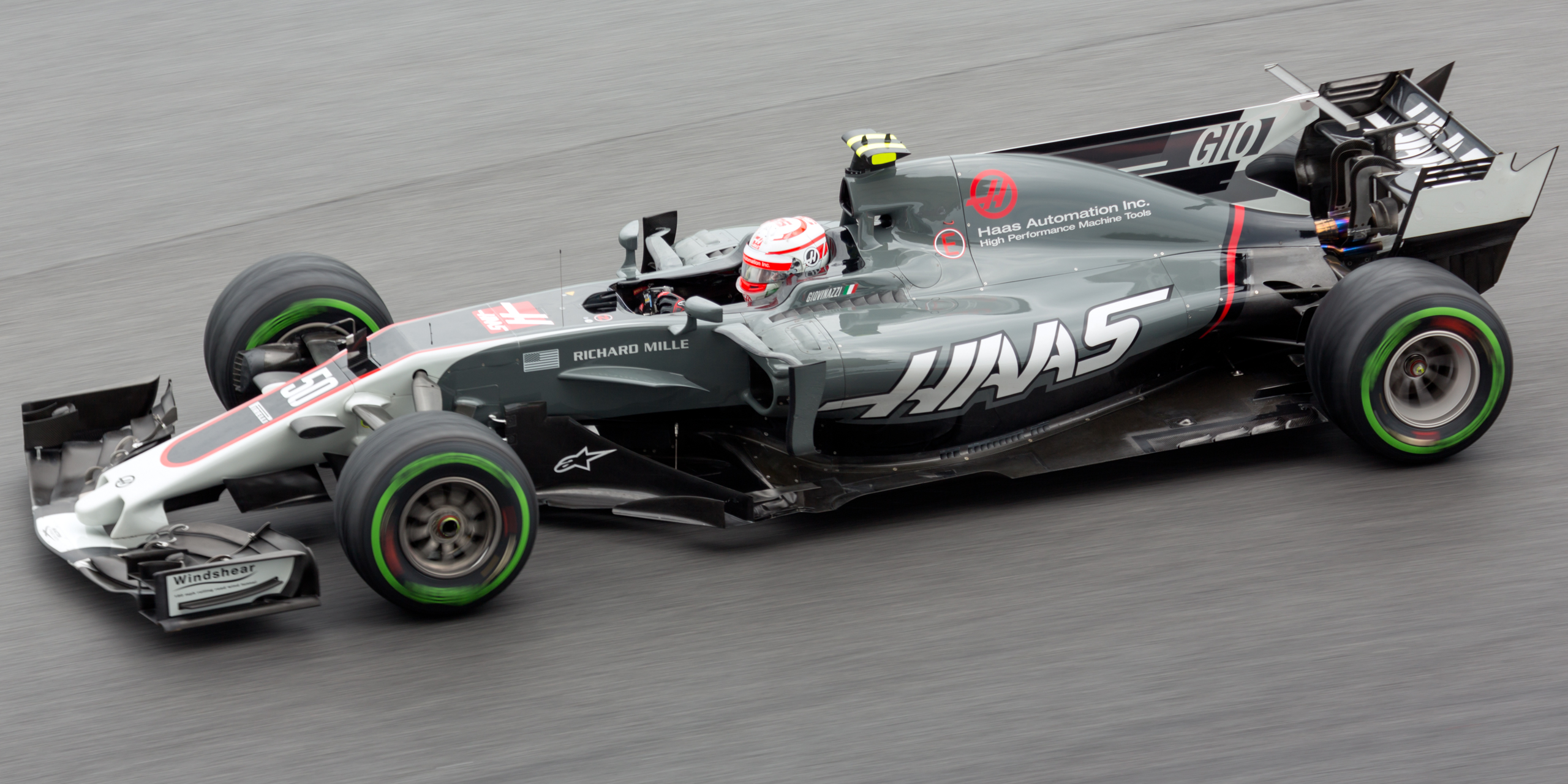
Giovinazzi testing for Haas during the 2017 Malaysian Grand Prix.

Giovinazzi later participated in seven free practice sessions for the Haas F1 Team over the course of the 2017 season. Giovinazzi remained a reserve and test driver for Sauber and Ferrari in 2018. He took part in six free practice sessions for Sauber during the season.

=== Alfa Romeo (2019–2021) ===
==== 2019 ====
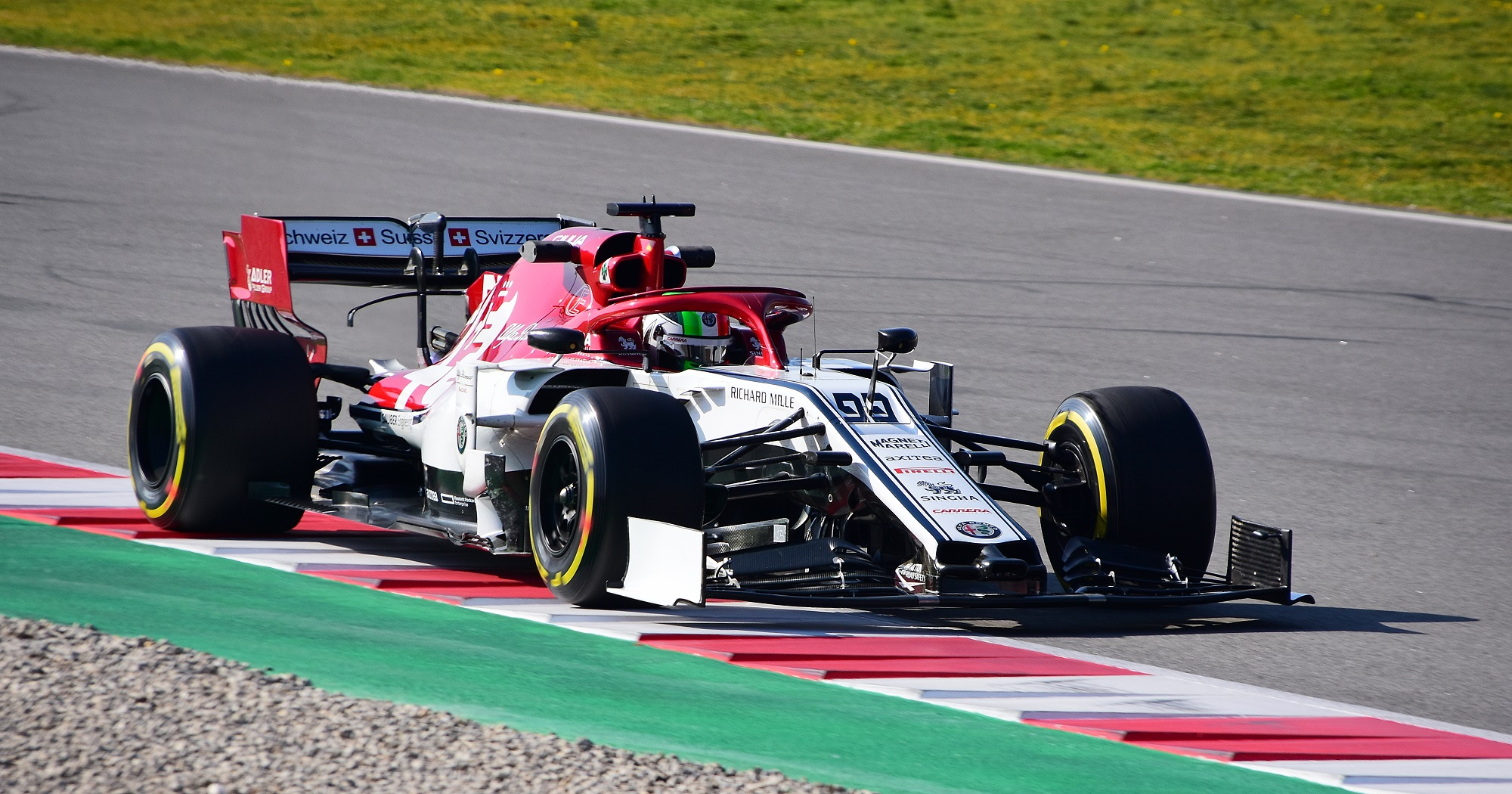
Giovinazzi testing the Alfa Romeo Racing C38 at Barcelona in 2019

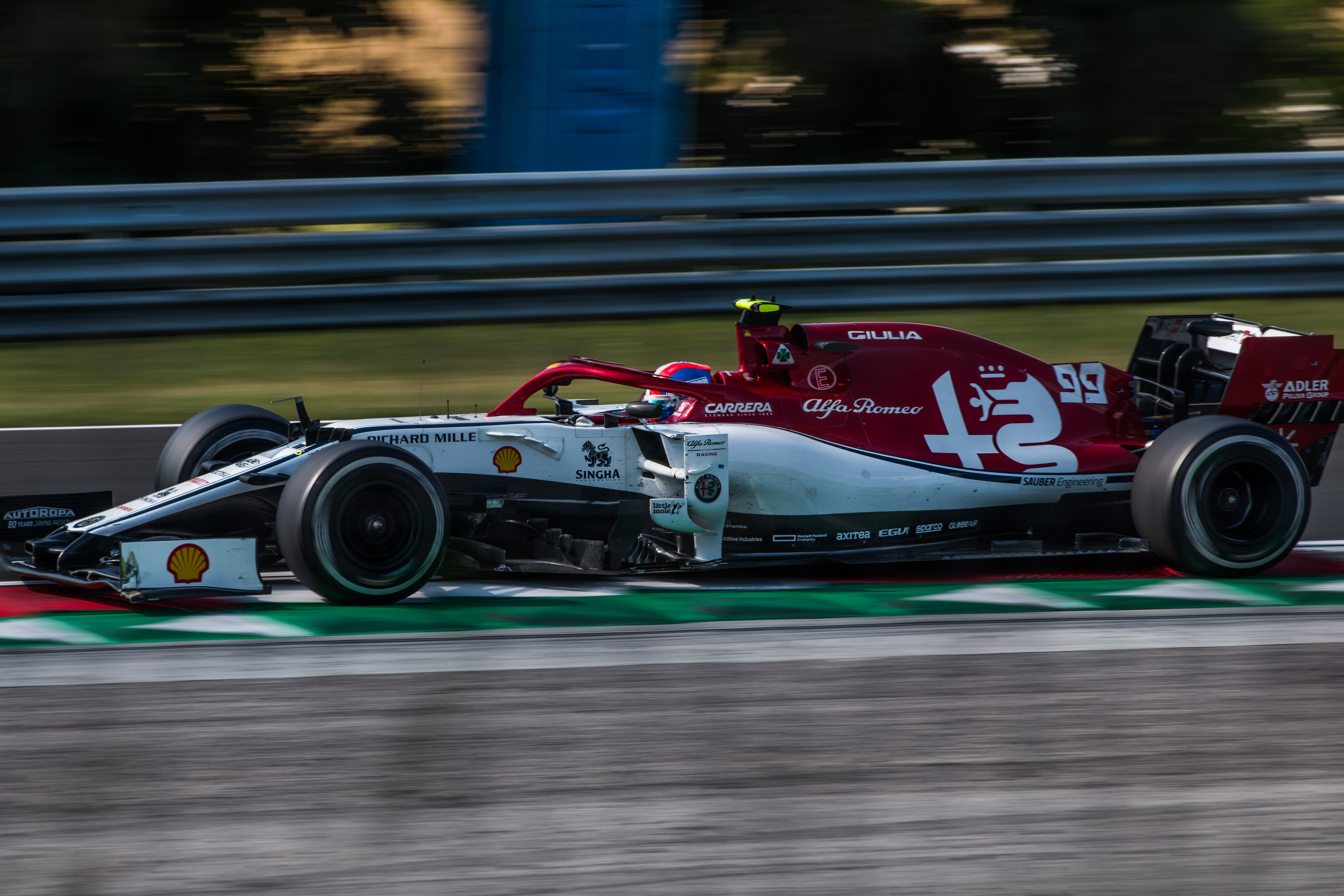
Giovinazzi at the 2019 Hungarian Grand Prix.

Giovinazzi drove for Alfa Romeo during the 2019 season, partnering Kimi Räikkönen and replacing Marcus Ericsson, who became the team's reserve driver. (Note: At the time of the announcement, the team was known as Sauber and the name was changed to Alfa Romeo Racing ahead of the start of the 2019 season.)

Giovinazzi went eight races without scoring points until he scored his first at the Austrian Grand Prix, finishing tenth. It was the first points finish for an Italian driver in Formula One since Vitantonio Liuzzi finished sixth at the 2010 Korean Grand Prix. The next race in Britain saw his first retirement of the season, after a mechanical problem caused him to spin out into a gravel trap. He crashed out on the last lap of the Belgian Grand Prix, having been running in ninth place. It later emerged that the crash caused Alfa Romeo to consider Giovinazzi's future with the team, with team principal Frédéric Vasseur saying "We had a tough discussion with Antonio, because these kind of things can decide your career. We were thinking about the future." At this stage of the season, Giovinazzi had collected one point, whilst teammate Räikkönen had scored 31.

The second half of the season was more successful for Giovinazzi. He claimed points a week after the Belgian Grand Prix with a ninth-place finish at his first home race in Formula One. On lap 27 of the Singapore Grand Prix, Giovinazzi led the race for four laps after the leaders had pitted. It was the first and only time he led a Formula One Grand Prix race in his career. For Alfa Romeo, it was the first time since Andrea de Cesaris led in the 1983 Belgian Grand Prix. Giovinazzi ultimately finished tenth, scoring points for the second consecutive race. At the Brazilian Grand Prix, he achieved his career best finish, crossing the line in sixth place before being promoted to fifth after Lewis Hamilton was penalised. Giovinazzi ended the season in 17th place in the championship with fourteen points.

==== 2020 ====
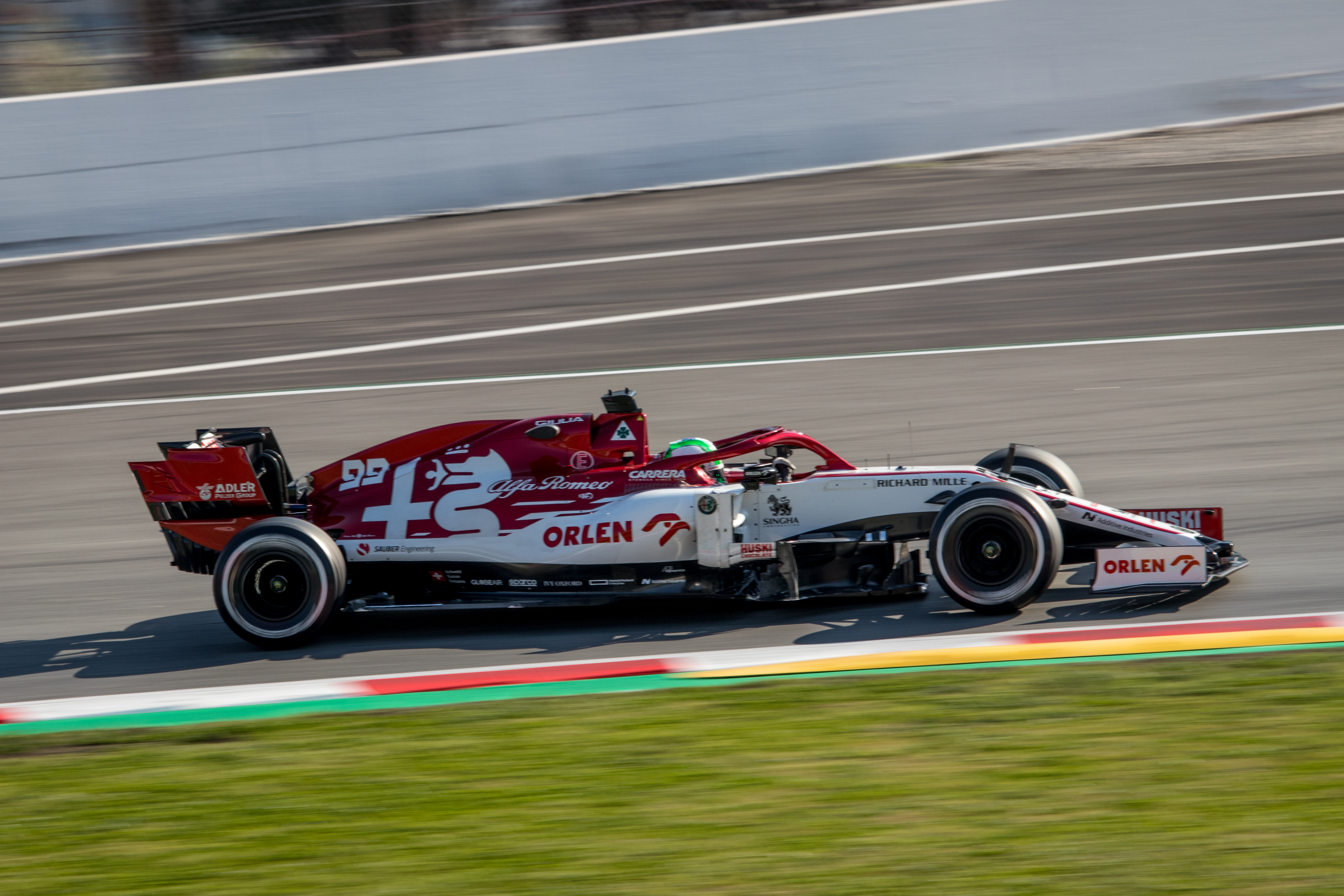
Giovinazzi in 2020, during pre-season testing

Giovinazzi and Räikkönen were retained by Alfa Romeo for the 2020 season.

Giovinazzi scored points at the first race of the season in Austria, qualifying 18th but finishing ninth after nine other cars retired from the race. On lap 11 of the Belgian Grand Prix, Giovinazzi lost control and crashed at turn 14. A stray wheel from his car hit the Williams of George Russell, causing both to retire from the race. He was involved in a high-speed accident at the Tuscan Grand Prix during the safety car restart, in which four cars were eliminated from the race. Two point-scoring finishes came at the Eifel Grand Prix, where he held off the Ferrari of Sebastian Vettel to finish tenth, and at the Emilia Romagna Grand Prix, where he scored another tenth-placed finish after starting from last on the grid. At the Turkish Grand Prix, Giovinazzi reached the third qualifying session (Q3) for the first time since the 2019 Austrian Grand Prix, qualifying tenth. He went on to retire from the race with gearbox problems.

Giovinazzi ended the season in 17th place in the drivers' championship. He scored four points, the same number as teammate Räikkönen, however Räikkönen placed above Giovinazzi by virtue of having more ninth-placed finishes. Giovinazzi outqualified Räikkönen at nine of the season's seventeen races.

==== 2021 ====
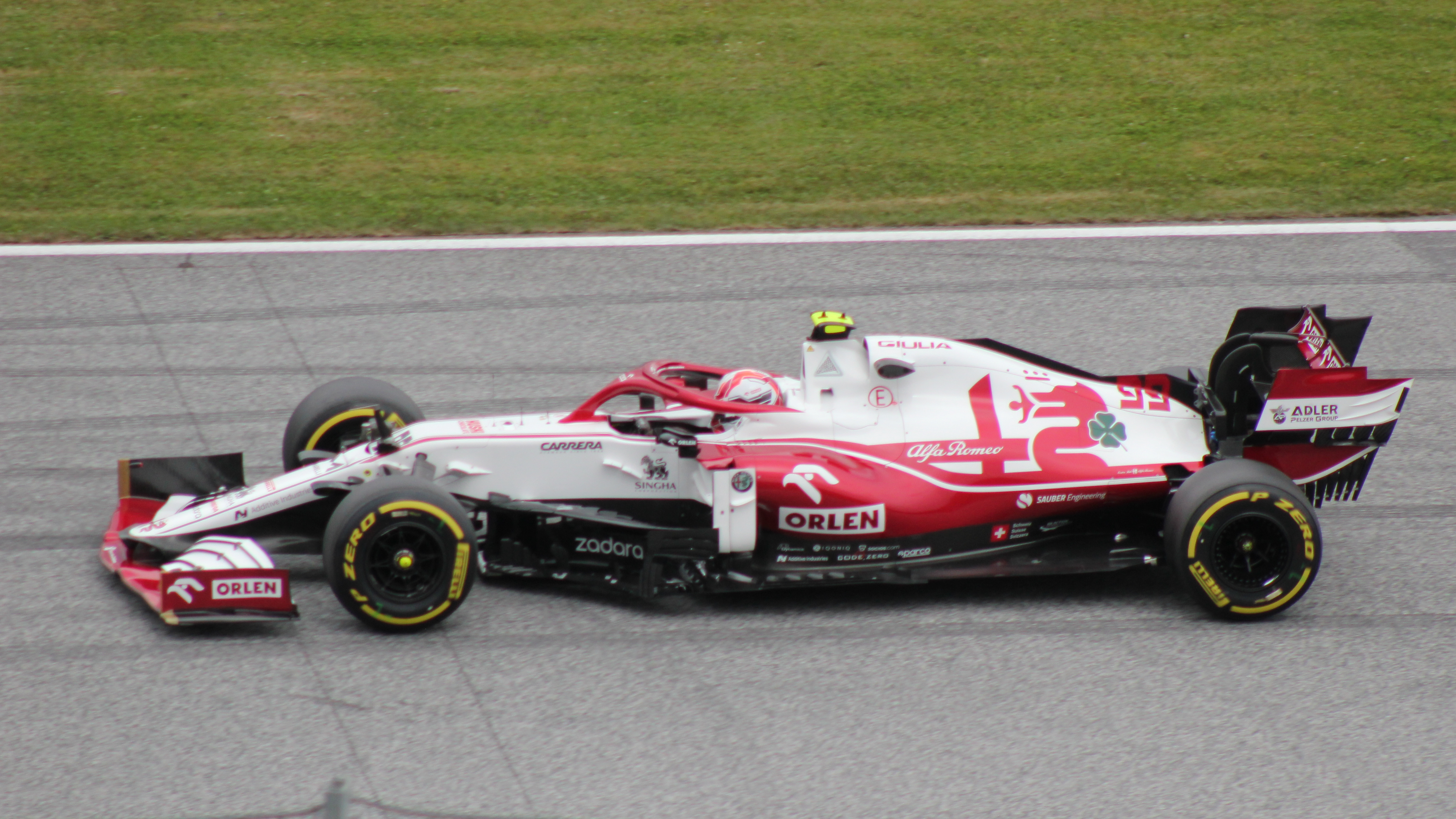
Giovinazzi at the 2021 Austrian Grand Prix

Giovinazzi and Räikkönen were retained by Alfa Romeo for the 2021 season. Giovinazzi qualified tenth for the Monaco Grand Prix, his first Q3 appearance of the year. He finished the race in tenth place, scoring Alfa Romeo's first point of the season. He would follow this up with eleventh in Azerbaijan.

Giovinazzi left Alfa Romeo at the end of the 2021 season, and became reserve driver for Ferrari, sharing duties with Mick Schumacher. As part of his 2021 contract, he also acted as a reserve driver for Ferrari's customer teams, Alfa Romeo and Haas.

=== Test driver roles (2022–present) ===
In September 2022, Giovinazzi participated in a test at the Fiorano circuit with the Ferrari SF21 together with the Russian-Israeli driver Robert Shwartzman, in order to prepare them both for free practice sessions throughout the season.

Giovinazzi was a test driver for Haas in 2022, and competed in free practice sessions at the Italian and United States Grands Prix for the team, though in the latter session the Italian could only run four laps before crashing and did not take further part in that practice. He later apologised to his team for the mistake. He took part in a test session with Alpine at the Hungaroring in late September, alongside Nyck de Vries and Jack Doohan.

Giovinazzi retained his reserve roles with Ferrari for 2023 alongside his main campaign in the World Endurance Championship.

Giovinazzi continued as a reserve driver for 2024, alongside then-Formula 2 driver Oliver Bearman. Giovinazzi maintained his reserve role for the 2025 season, a fourth consecutive year, alongside former Sauber driver Zhou Guanyu. He completed a test at the end of January with the Ferrari SF-23 at the Circuit de Barcelona-Catalunya.

== Sportscar racing career ==
=== Le Mans Series ===
In 2016, Giovinazzi took part in the Asian Le Mans Series in the LMP2 class alongside Sean Gelael. They entered the final two rounds at Buriram and Sepang, winning both races. Giovinazzi then entered the Silverstone round of the European Le Mans Series alongside Gelael and Mitch Evans for SMP Racing, in which they came fifth.

=== FIA World Endurance Championship ===
==== ESM (2016) ====
In the FIA World Endurance Championship, Giovinazzi took part in the 2016 6 Hours of Fuji alongside Gelael and Giedo van der Garde for the Extreme Speed Motorsports team, in which they finished fourth in the LMP2 class. He then took part in the following round in Shanghai alongside Gelael and Tom Blomqvist, finishing second.

==== AF Corse (2018) ====
Giovinazzi took part at the 2018 24 Hours of Le Mans driving a Ferrari 488 GTE for AF Corse Ferrari factory team alongside Toni Vilander and Pipo Derani. He finished the race fifth in LMGTE PRO category, and 20th overall.

==== Ferrari (2023–present) ====
===== 2023 =====
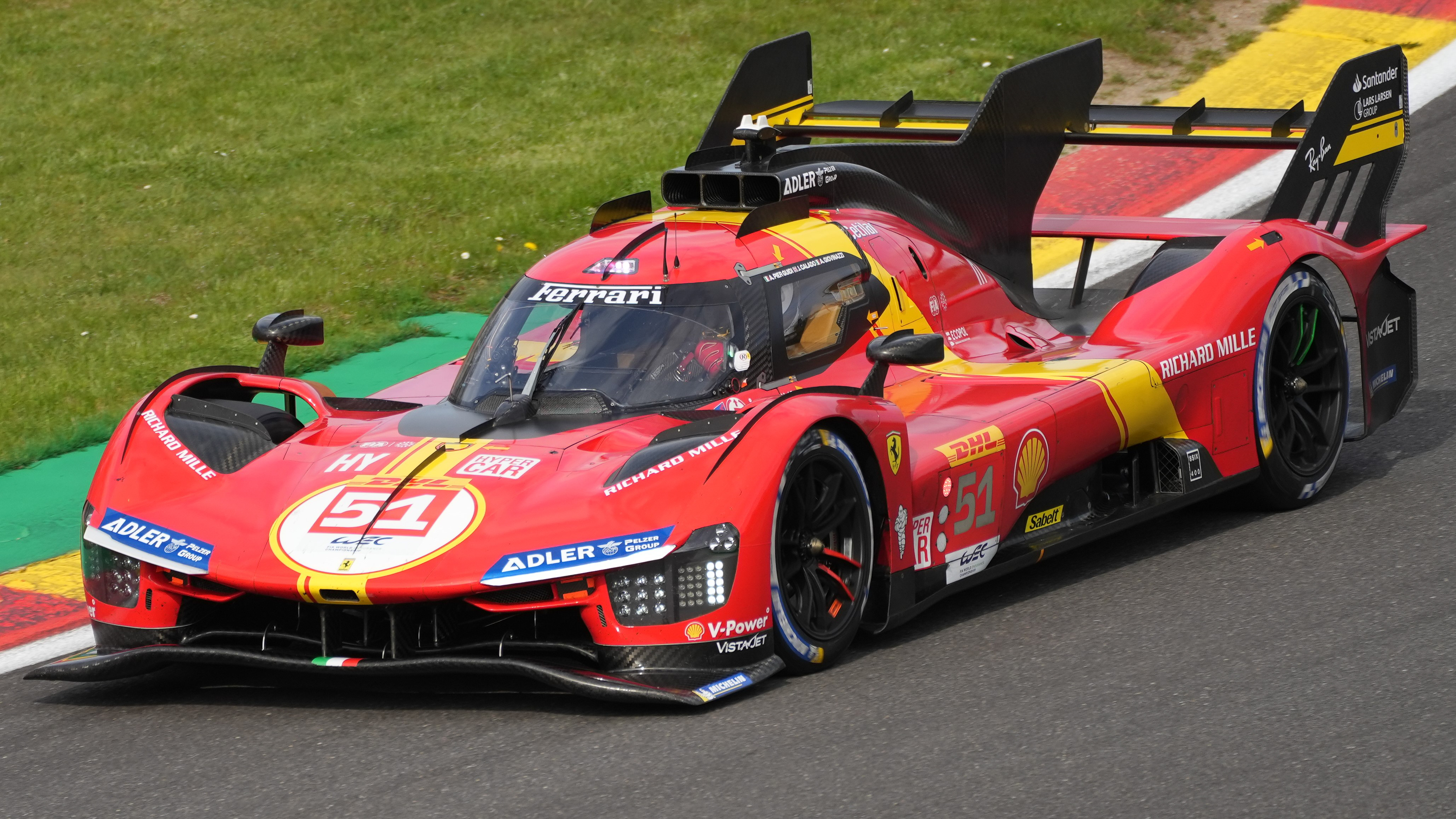
#51 Ferrari 499P from Scuderia Ferrari driven by Antonio Giovinazzi, James Calado, and Alessandro Pier Guidi

On 10 January 2023, it was announced that Giovinazzi would drive the No. 51 Ferrari 499P LMH for Ferrari AF Corse in the 2023 FIA World Endurance Championship alongside drivers James Calado and Alessandro Pier Guidi, with the No. 50 sister car being made up of drivers Antonio Fuoco, Miguel Molina and Nicklas Nielsen.

Giovinazzi's first victory as a factory Ferrari driver came at the 2023 24 Hours of Le Mans. His performance forms part of a historic win for the Italian marque, as it was 50 years after their last top-class entry in 1973.

===== 2024 =====
Giovinazzi retained his seat for the 2024 season, in the same No. 51 lineup. The season would be less successful for Giovinazzi with the No. 51 lineup finishing eighth in the drivers championship with 59 points scoring their best finish of third place at Le Mans.

===== 2025 =====
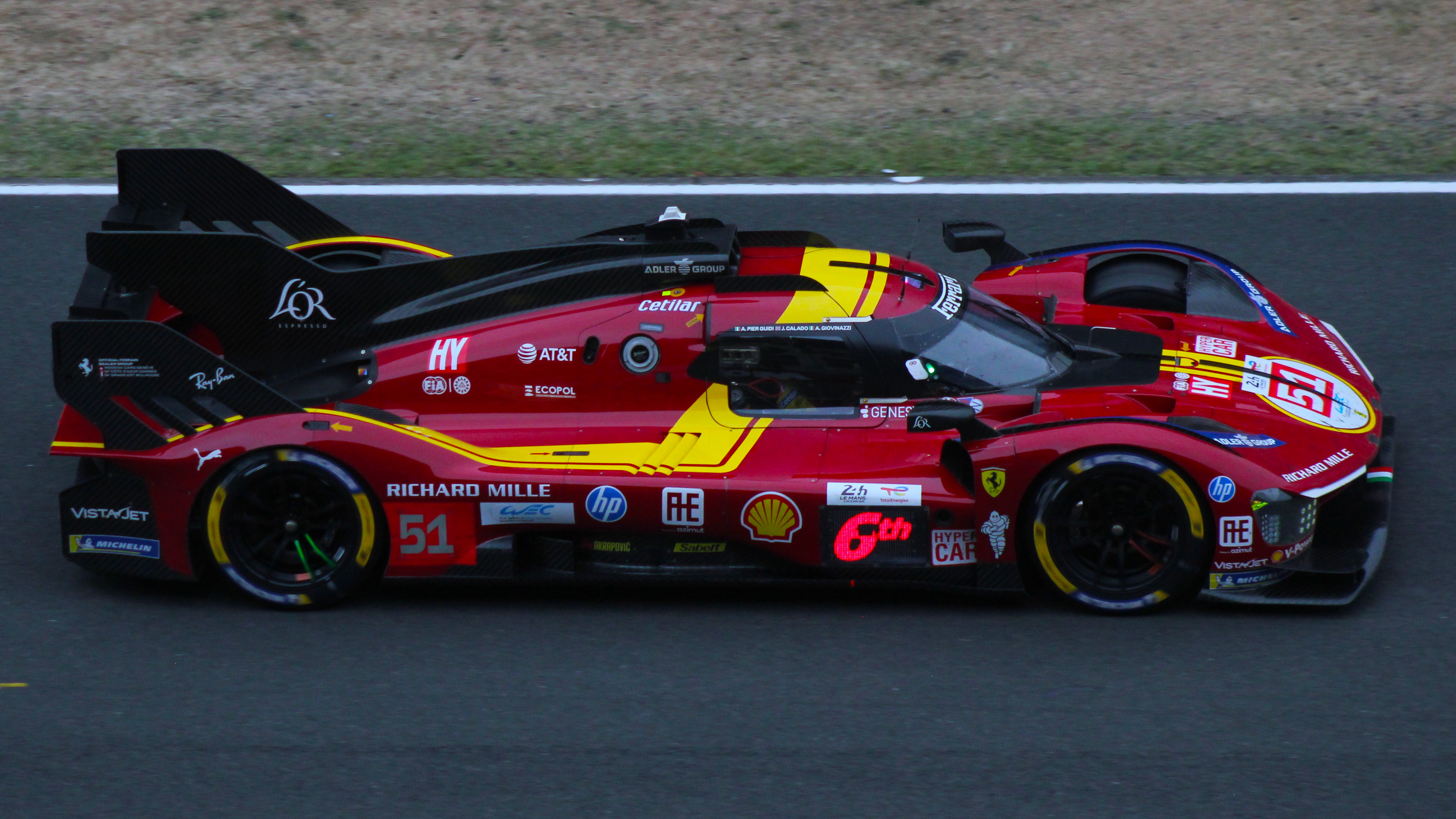
Giovinazzi's No. 51 car at the 2025 24 Hours of Le Mans

In July 2025, Giovinazzi signed a multi-year deal to remain to drive for Ferrari AF Corse for the 2026 season and beyond.

== Other racing ==
=== Deutsche Tourenwagen Masters ===
Giovinazzi had impressed Audi Sport Team Phoenix during a DTM test in 2015, before being called up to replace the suspended Timo Scheider for the round at Moscow Raceway during the 2015 DTM season. He finished the races in 19th and 21st.

=== Formula E ===
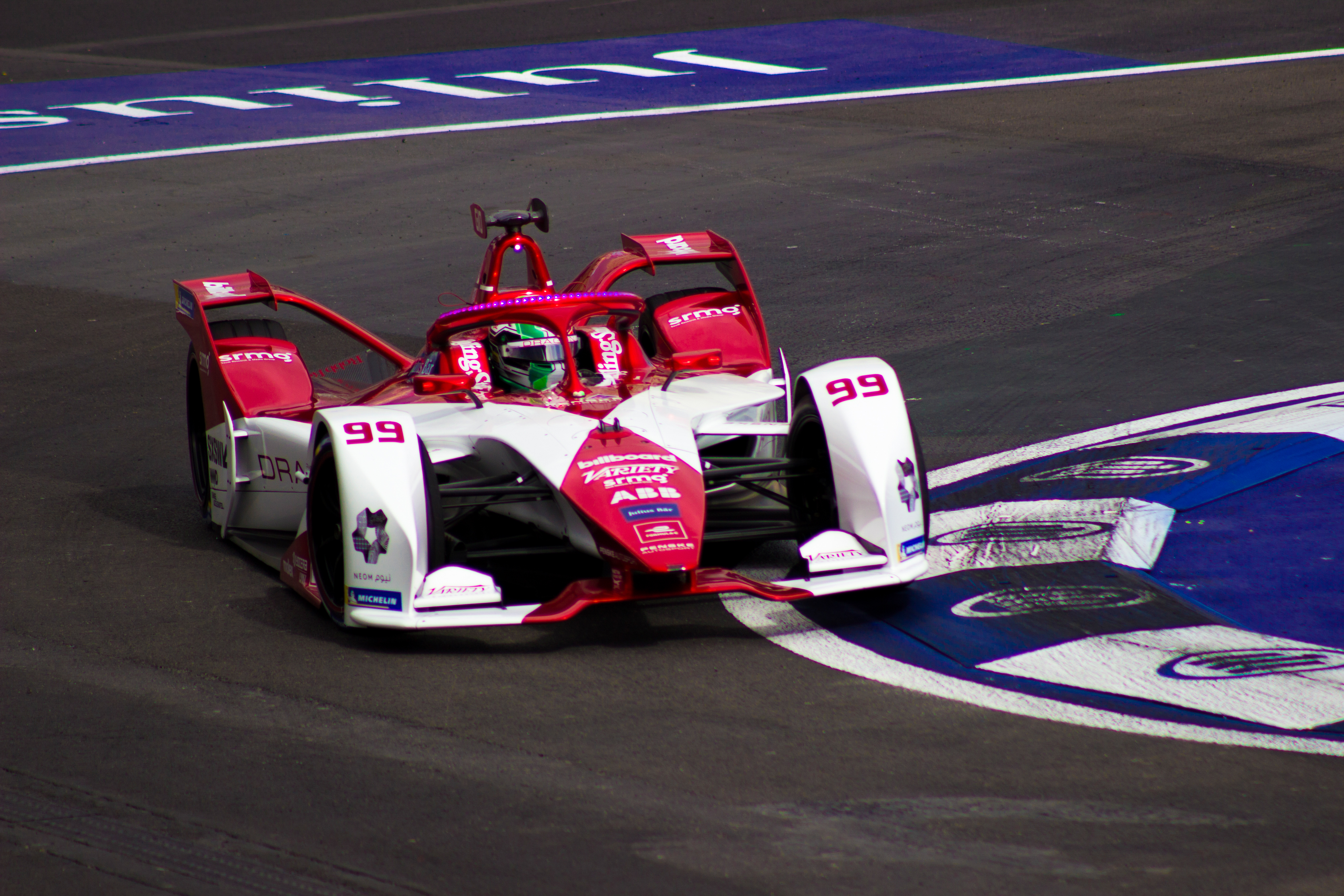
Giovinazzi at the 2022 Mexico City ePrix, his third Formula E appearance.

After losing his full-time Formula One seat in 2021, Giovinazzi was signed by Dragon Penske Autosport to drive alongside Sérgio Sette Câmara in the 2021–22 Formula E World Championship. He was ruled out of the final race in Seoul due to a thumb injury, caused by contact with Alexander Sims. Giovinazzi finished 23rd in the championship with no points, being the only full-time driver to fail to score points. Giovinazzi left the team as they rebranded to DS Penske, with Stoffel Vandoorne and Jean-Éric Vergne replacing him and teammate Sette Câmara for the 2022–23 season.

== Karting record ==
=== Karting career summary ===
Season	Series	Team	Position
2005	Torneo Industrie — Minikart		11th
2006	Torneo Industrie — Minikart		1st
2006	Euro Trophy — 60 Mini		1st
2006	Italian National Trophy — 60 cc		1st
2007	Andrea Margutti Trophy — KF3		NC
2007	Copa Campeones Trophy — KF3		5th
2007	Italian Open Masters — KF3		15th
2007	CIK-FIA European Championship — KF3		NC
2008	Andrea Margutti Trophy — KF3	Comer Spa	NC
2008	Copa Campeones Trophy — KF3	Comer Spa	2nd
2008	Torneo Industrie — KF3	Comer Spa	2nd
2008	Italian Open Masters — KF3	Comer Spa	NC
2008	CIK-FIA European Championship — KF3	Comer Spa	23rd
2008	WSK International Series — KF3	Comer Spa	28th
2009	South Garda Winter Cup — KF2	Comer	NC
2009	Andrea Margutti Trophy — KF2	Comer	3rd
2009	Trofeo delle Industrie — KF2	Comer	5th
2009	European Championship Qualification Central Region — KF2	Comer	3rd
2009	CIK-FIA European Championship — KF2	Comer	NC
2009	CIK-FIA World Cup — KF2	Comer	29th
2009	WSK International Series — KF2	Comer	17th
2010	Trofeo delle Industrie — KF2		8th
2010	Copa Campeones Trophy — KF2		4th
2010	South Garda Winter Cup — KF2	Comer	31st
2010	WSK Euro Series — KF2	Comer	27th
2010	CIK-FIA European Championship — KF2	Comer	18th
2010	WSK World Series — KF2	Comer	13th
2010	CIK-FIA World Championship — KF2	Comer	12th
2010	WSK Master Series — KF2	Comer	1st
2010	WSK Nations Cup — KF2		33rd
2011	South Garda Winter Cup — KF2	Scuderia PCR	6th
2011	CIK-FIA South European Trophy — KF2	Scuderia PCR	8th
2011	CIK-FIA European Championship — KF2	Scuderia PCR	5th
2011	WSK Euro Series — KF2	Scuderia PCR	6th
2011	CIK-FIA World Cup — KF2	Scuderia PCR	3rd
2011	WSK Master Series — KF2	Scuderia PCR	1st
2011	Bridgestone Cup European Final — KF2		2nd
2011	CIK-FIA U18 World Championship — KF2	SCS Srl	6th
2012	Indonesia Kart Prix — KF2	Sean GP	1st
2012	WSK Master Series — KF2	Sean GP	19th
2012	Andrea Margutti Trophy — KF2	Sean GP	8th
2012	WSK Euro Series — KF2	Sean GP	12th
2012	CIK-FIA World Championship — KF1	Sean GP	DNF

== Racing record ==
=== Racing career summary ===
Season	Series	Team	Races	Wins	Poles	F/Laps	Podiums	Points	Position
2012	Formula Pilota China	Eurasia Motorsport	18	6	7	6	13	229	**1st**
2012	Formula Abarth	BVM	3	2	0	0	3	0	NC†
2013	FIA Formula 3 European Championship	Double R Racing	30	0	0	0	0	31	17th
2013	British Formula 3 Championship	Double R Racing	12	2	0	0	7	135	**2nd**
2013	Masters of Formula 3	Double R Racing	1	0	0	0	0	N/A	10th
2014	FIA Formula 3 European Championship	Jagonya Ayam with Carlin	33	2	2	3	7	238	6th
2015	FIA Formula 3 European Championship	Jagonya Ayam with Carlin	33	6	4	4	20	412.5	**2nd**
2015	Masters of Formula 3	Jagonya Ayam with Carlin	1	1	1	1	1	N/A	**1st**
2015	Macau Grand Prix	Jagonya Ayam with Carlin	1	0	0	0	0	N/A	4th
2015	Deutsche Tourenwagen Masters	Audi Sport Team Phoenix	2	0	0	0	0	0	25th
2015–16	Asian Le Mans Series	Jagonya Ayam with Eurasia	2	2	1	0	2	51	4th
2016	GP2 Series	Prema Racing	22	5	2	2	8	211	**2nd**
2016	European Le Mans Series	SMP Racing	1	0	0	0	0	10	24th
2016	FIA World Endurance Championship - LMP2	Extreme Speed Motorsports	2	0	0	0	1	30	20th
2017	Formula One	Sauber F1 Team	2	0	0	0	0	0	22nd
2017	Formula One	Scuderia Ferrari	Reserve driver						
2017	Formula One	Haas F1 Team	Reserve driver						
2018	24 Hours of Le Mans - LMGTE Pro	AF Corse	1	0	0	0	0	N/A	5th
2018	Formula One	Scuderia Ferrari	Reserve driver						
2018	Formula One	Alfa Romeo Sauber F1 Team	Reserve driver						
2019	Formula One	Alfa Romeo Racing	21	0	0	0	0	14	17th
2019	Formula One	Scuderia Ferrari	Reserve driver						
2020	Formula One	Alfa Romeo Racing ORLEN	17	0	0	0	0	4	17th
2020	Formula One	Scuderia Ferrari	Reserve driver						
2021	Formula One	Alfa Romeo Racing ORLEN	22	0	0	0	0	3	18th
2021	Formula One	Scuderia Ferrari	Reserve driver						
2021–22	Formula E	Dragon / Penske Autosport	15	0	0	0	0	0	23rd
2022	Formula One	Scuderia Ferrari	Reserve driver						
2022	Formula One	Alfa Romeo F1 Team ORLEN	Reserve driver						
2022	Formula One	Haas F1 Team	Reserve driver						
2023	FIA World Endurance Championship - Hypercar	Ferrari AF Corse	7	1	0	0	2	114	4th
2023	24 Hours of Le Mans - Hypercar	Ferrari AF Corse	1	1	0	0	1	N/A	**1st**
2023	Formula One	Scuderia Ferrari	Reserve driver						
2024	FIA World Endurance Championship - Hypercar	Ferrari AF Corse	8	0	1	0	1	59	8th
2024	Formula One	Scuderia Ferrari	Reserve driver						
2025	FIA World Endurance Championship - Hypercar	Ferrari AF Corse	8	2	2	0	4	133	**1st**
2025	Formula One	Scuderia Ferrari HP	Reserve driver						
2026	FIA World Endurance Championship - Hypercar	Ferrari AF Corse	8	0	2	0	3	74	8th
2026	Formula One	Scuderia Ferrari HP	Reserve driver						

^{†} As Giovinazzi was a guest driver, he was ineligible for points.

=== Single seater racing results ===
==== Complete Formula Pilota China results ====
(key) (Races in bold indicate pole position) (Races in italics indicate fastest lap)

Year	Entrant	1	2	3	4	5	6	7	8	9	10	11	12	13	14	15	16	17	18	DC	Points
2012	Eurasia Motorsport	SHI; 1; 3	SHI; 2; 4	SHI; 3; 2	ORD1; 1; 2	**ORD1**; **2**; 4	ORD1; 3; 2	ORD2; 1; 1	**ORD2**; **2**; 1	ORD2; 3; 3	**GUA**; **1**; 5	GUA; 2 Ret	GUA; 3; 2	**SEP1**; **1**; 1	SEP1; 2; 1	**SEP1**; **3**; 1	SEP2; 1; 1	**SEP2**; **2** Ret	SEP2; 3; 2	1st	229

==== Complete British Formula Three Championship results ====
(key) (Races in bold indicate pole position) (Races in italics indicate fastest lap)

Year	Entrant	1	2	3	4	5	6	7	8	9	10	11	12	DC	Points
2013	Double R Racing	SIL; 1; 6	SIL; 2; 1	SIL; 3; 7	SPA; 1; 5	SPA; 2; 3	SPA; 3; 1	BRH; 1; 3	BRH; 2; 2	BRH; 3 Ret	NÜR; 1; 2	NÜR; 2; 6	NÜR; 3; 3	2nd	135

==== Complete FIA Formula 3 European Championship results ====
(key) (Races in bold indicate pole position) (Races in italics indicate fastest lap)

Year	Entrant	Engine	1	2	3	4	5	6	7	8	9	10	11	12	13	14	15	16	17	18	19	20	21	22	23	24	25	26	27	28	29	30	31	32	33	DC	Points
2013	Double R Racing	Mercedes	MNZ; 1; 22†	MNZ; 2; 12	MNZ; 3; 13	SIL; 1 DSQ	SIL; 2 DNS	SIL; 3; 11	HOC; 1; 12	HOC; 2 Ret	HOC; 3; 24	BRH; 1; 11	BRH; 2; 16	BRH; 3; 9	RBR; 1; 15	RBR; 2; 23	RBR; 3 Ret	NOR; 1 Ret	NOR; 2; 23	NOR; 3 Ret	NÜR; 1; 18	NÜR; 2; 16	NÜR; 3; 10	ZAN; 1; 14	ZAN; 2 Ret	ZAN; 3; 11	VAL; 1; 9	VAL; 2; 7	VAL; 3; 13	HOC; 1; 17	HOC; 2; 7	HOC; 3; 6				17th	31
2014	Jagonya Ayam with Carlin	Volkswagen	SIL; 1; 12	SIL; 2; 8	SIL; 3; 5	HOC; 1 Ret	HOC; 2; 2	HOC; 3; 5	PAU; 1; 7	PAU; 2; 4	PAU; 3; 10	HUN; 1; 23†	HUN; 2; 6	HUN; 3; 5	SPA; 1 Ret	SPA; 2; 9	SPA; 3; 11	NOR; 1 Ret	NOR; 2; 9	NOR; 3; 7	MSC; 1; 13	MSC; 2; 16	MSC; 3; 10	RBR; 1; 2	**RBR**; **2**; 16	**RBR**; **3**; 1	NÜR; 1; 3	NÜR; 2; 1	NÜR; 3 Ret	IMO; 1; 5	IMO; 2; 3	IMO; 3 Ret	HOC; 1; 4	HOC; 2; 2	HOC; 3; 5	6th	238
2015	Jagonya Ayam with Carlin	Volkswagen	SIL; 1; 2	SIL; 2; 3	SIL; 3; 2	HOC; 1; 1	HOC; 2; 3	HOC; 3; 3	PAU; 1; 2	PAU; 2; 3	PAU; 3; 1	MNZ; 1; 4	MNZ; 2 Ret	MNZ; 3; 4	SPA; 1 Ret	SPA; 2; 9	SPA; 3; 15	NOR; 1; 2	NOR; 2; 22	NOR; 3; 1	**ZAN**; **1**; 1	ZAN; 2; 2	**ZAN**; **3**; 2	RBR; 1; 3	RBR; 2; 2	**RBR**; **3**; 1	ALG; 1; 9	ALG; 2; 8	ALG; 3; 8	NÜR; 1; 10	NÜR; 2; 2	NÜR; 3; 13	HOC; 1; 6	**HOC**; **2**; 1	HOC; 3; 3	2nd	412.5

^{†} Driver did not finish the race, but was classified as he completed over 90% of the race distance.

==== Complete Macau Grand Prix results ====
Year	Team	Car	Qualifying	Quali Race	Main race
2015	(United Kingdom) Carlin	Dallara F312	4th	10th	4th

==== Complete GP2 Series results ====
(key) (races in bold indicate pole position) (races in italics indicate fastest lap)

Year	Entrant	1	2	3	4	5	6	7	8	9	10	11	12	13	14	15	16	17	18	19	20	21	22	DC	Points
2016	Prema Racing	CAT; FEA; 18	CAT; SPR; Ret	MON; FEA; 11	MON; SPR; 18	**BAK**; **FEA**; 1	BAK; SPR; 1	RBR; FEA; Ret	RBR; SPR; 5	SIL; FEA; 2	SIL; SPR; 4	HUN; FEA; 2	HUN; SPR; 17†	HOC; FEA; 8	HOC; SPR; Ret	**SPA**; **FEA**; 6	SPA; SPR; 1	MNZ; FEA; 1	MNZ; SPR; 3	SEP; FEA; 1	SEP; SPR; 4	YMC; FEA; 5	YMC; SPR; 6	2nd	211

==== Complete Formula One results ====
(key) (Races in bold indicate pole position; races in italics indicate fastest lap)

Year	Entrant	Chassis	Engine	1	2	3	4	5	6	7	8	9	10	11	12	13	14	15	16	17	18	19	20	21	22	WDC	Points
2017	Sauber F1 Team	Sauber C36	Ferrari 061 1.6 V6 t	AUS; 12	CHN; Ret	BHR	RUS	ESP	MON	CAN	AZE	AUT														22nd	0
2017	Haas F1 Team	Haas VF-17	Ferrari 062 1.6 V6 t										GBR; TD	HUN; TD	BEL	ITA	SIN; TD	MAL; TD	JPN	USA	MEX; TD	BRA; TD	ABU; TD			22nd	0
2018	Alfa Romeo Sauber F1 Team	Sauber C37	Ferrari 062 EVO 1.6 V6 t	AUS	BHR	CHN	AZE	ESP	MON	CAN	FRA	AUT	GBR	GER; TD	HUN; TD	BEL	ITA	SIN	RUS; TD	JPN	USA	MEX; TD	BRA; TD	ABU; TD		–	–
2019	Alfa Romeo Racing	Alfa Romeo Racing C38	Ferrari 064 1.6 V6 t	AUS; 15	BHR; 11	CHN; 15	AZE; 12	ESP; 16	MON; 19	CAN; 13	FRA; 16	AUT; 10	GBR; Ret	GER; 13	HUN; 18	BEL; 18†	ITA; 9	SIN; 10	RUS; 15	JPN; 14	MEX; 14	USA; 14	BRA; 5	ABU; 16		17th	14
2020	Alfa Romeo Racing ORLEN	Alfa Romeo Racing C39	Ferrari 065 1.6 V6 t	AUT; 9	STY; 14	HUN; 17	GBR; 14	70A; 17	ESP; 16	BEL; Ret	ITA; 16	TUS; Ret	RUS; 11	EIF; 10	POR; 15	EMI; 10	TUR; Ret	BHR; 16	SKH; 13	ABU; 16						17th	4
2021	Alfa Romeo Racing ORLEN	Alfa Romeo Racing C41	Ferrari 065/6 1.6 V6 t	BHR; 12	EMI; 14	POR; 12	ESP; 15	MON; 10	AZE; 11	FRA; 15	STY; 15	AUT; 14	GBR; 13	HUN; 13	BEL; 13	NED; 14	ITA; 13	RUS; 16	TUR; 11	USA; 11	MXC; 11	SAP; 14	QAT; 15	SAU; 9	ABU; Ret	18th	3
2022	Haas F1 Team	Haas VF-22	Ferrari 066/7 V6 t	BHR	SAU	AUS	EMI	MIA	ESP	MON	AZE	CAN	GBR	AUT	FRA	HUN	BEL	NED	ITA; TD	SIN	JPN	USA; TD	MXC	SAP	ABU	-	-

^{†} Did not finish, but was classified as driver had completed more than 90% of the race distance.

==== Complete Formula E results ====
(key) (Races in bold indicate pole position; races in italics indicate fastest lap)

Year	Team	Chassis	Powertrain	1	2	3	4	5	6	7	8	9	10	11	12	13	14	15	16	Pos	Points
2021–22	Dragon / Penske Autosport	Spark SRT05e	Penske EV-5	DRH; 20	DRH; 20	MEX; Ret	RME; 18	RME; Ret	MCO; 16	BER; 20	BER; 22	JAK; Ret	MRK; 19	NYC; Ret	NYC; Ret	LDN; Ret	LDN; Ret	SEO; Ret	SEO; WD	23rd	0

=== Sports car racing results ===
==== Complete Asian Le Mans Series results ====
Year	Entrant	Class	Chassis	Engine	1	2	3	4	Rank	Points
2015–16	Jagonya Ayam with Eurasia	LMP2	Oreca 03R	Nissan VK45DE 4.5 L V8	FUJ	SEP1	**BUR**; 1	SEP2; 1	4th	51

==== Complete European Le Mans Series results ====
Year	Entrant	Class	Chassis	Engine	1	2	3	4	5	6	Rank	Points
2016	SMP Racing	LMP2	BR Engineering BR01	Nissan VK45DE 4.5 L V8	SIL; 5	IMO	RBR	LEC	SPA	EST	24th	10

==== Complete FIA World Endurance Championship results ====
Year	Entrant	Class	Chassis	Engine	1	2	3	4	5	6	7	8	9	Rank	Points
2016	Extreme Speed Motorsports	LMP2	Ligier JS P2	Nissan VK45DE 4.5 L V8	SIL	SPA	LMS	NÜR	MEX	COA	FUJ; 4	SHA; 2	BHR	20th	30
2023	Ferrari AF Corse	Hypercar	Ferrari 499P	Ferrari F163CG 3.0 L Turbo V6	SEB; 7	ALG; 6	SPA; 3	LMS; 1	MNZ; 5	FUJ; 5	BHR; 6			4th	114
2024	Ferrari AF Corse	Hypercar	Ferrari 499P	Ferrari F163CG 3.0 L Turbo V6	QAT; 12	IMO; 7	SPA; 4	LMS; 3	SÃO; 5	**COA**; Ret	FUJ; Ret	BHR; 14		8th	59
2025	Ferrari AF Corse	Hypercar	Ferrari 499P	Ferrari F163CG 3.0 L Turbo V6	**QAT**; 3	**IMO**; 1	SPA; 1	LMS; 3	SÃO; 11	COA; 5	FUJ; 15	BHR; 4		1st	133
2026	Ferrari AF Corse	Hypercar	Ferrari 499P	Ferrari F163CG 3.0 L Turbo V6	**IMO**; 2	SPA; Ret	LMS; 5	SÃO; 2	**COA**; 11	FUJ; 10	CAT; 15	MNZ; 3		8th	74

==== Complete 24 Hours of Le Mans results ====
Year	Team	Co-Drivers	Car	Class	Laps	Pos.	Class Pos.
2018	(Italy) AF Corse	(Finland) Toni Vilander (Brazil) Pipo Derani	Ferrari 488 GTE Evo	GTE; Pro	341	20th	5th
2023	(Italy) Ferrari AF Corse	(United Kingdom) James Calado (Italy) Alessandro Pier Guidi	Ferrari 499P	Hypercar	342	**1st**	**1st**
2024	(Italy) Ferrari AF Corse	(United Kingdom) James Calado (Italy) Alessandro Pier Guidi	Ferrari 499P	Hypercar	311	**3rd**	**3rd**
2025	(Italy) Ferrari AF Corse	(United Kingdom) James Calado (Italy) Alessandro Pier Guidi	Ferrari 499P	Hypercar	387	**3rd**	**3rd**
2026	(Italy) Ferrari AF Corse	(United Kingdom) James Calado (Italy) Alessandro Pier Guidi	Ferrari 499P	Hypercar	381	5th	5th

== See also ==
- Formula One drivers from Italy

Sporting positions
Preceded by Mathéo Tuscher	Formula Pilota China; Champion; 2012	Succeeded by Aidan Wright (Formula Masters China)
Preceded by Max Verstappen	Masters of Formula 3 Winner; 2015	Succeeded by Joel Eriksson
Preceded by Sébastien Buemi; Brendon Hartley; Ryō Hirakawa	Winner of the 24 Hours of Le Mans; 2023; With: James Calado & Alessandro Pier Guidi	Succeeded by Antonio Fuoco; Miguel Molina; Nicklas Nielsen
Preceded by André Lotterer; Kévin Estre; Laurens Vanthoor	World Endurance Championship; Champion; 2025; With: James Calado & Alessandro Pier Guidi	Succeeded by Sébastien Buemi; Brendon Hartley; Ryō Hirakawa
Awards
Preceded by Valtteri Bottas	Lorenzo Bandini Trophy; 2019	Succeeded by Charles Leclerc
