= 2019 British Grand Prix =

Race 10 of 21 in the 2019 Formula One World Championship
← Previous race	Next race →
- Layout of the Silverstone Circuit

Race details
- Date: 14 July 2019
- Official name: Formula 1 Rolex British Grand Prix 2019
- Location: Silverstone Circuit; Silverstone, United Kingdom
- Course: Permanent racing facility
- Course length: 5.891 km (3.660 miles)
- Distance: 52 laps, 306.198 km (190.263 miles)
- Weather: Partly cloudy
- Attendance: 351,000 (race weekend); 141,000 (race)

Pole position
Driver	(Finland) Valtteri Bottas	Mercedes
- Time: 1:25.093

Fastest lap
Driver	(United Kingdom) Lewis Hamilton	Mercedes
- Time: 1:27.369 on lap 52

Podium
First	(United Kingdom) Lewis Hamilton	Mercedes
Second	(Finland) Valtteri Bottas	Mercedes
Third	(Monaco) Charles Leclerc	Ferrari

The 2019 British Grand Prix (formally known as the Formula 1 Rolex British Grand Prix 2019) was a Formula One motor race held on 14 July 2019 at the Silverstone Circuit in Silverstone, United Kingdom. The race was the 10th round of the 2019 Formula One World Championship. It marked the 74th running of the British Grand Prix, the 70th time that the race has been run as a World Championship event and the 53rd time that the World Championship event has been held at the Silverstone Circuit. Lewis Hamilton won the race for a record sixth time.

== Background ==
Formally called the "Formula 1 Rolex British Grand Prix 2019", this was a Formula One Grand Prix event and the tenth round of the 2019 Formula One World Championship. The event took place over the weekend of 12–14 July 2019 at the Silverstone motor racing circuit in Northamptonshire. The circuit had a lap length of 5.891 km (3.660 miles) and, prior to the race, a lap record time of 1'30.621, set by Lewis Hamilton during the 2017 British Grand Prix. The race length was set as 306.198 km (190.263 miles), which is 52 laps of the circuit. With the first British Grand Prix having been held in 1926 and the second in 1927 and then there having been one held each year since 1948, with each race since 1950 being a World Championship event, the 2019 event was the 74th time that the British Grand Prix had been held and the 70th time it had been a World Championship event.

The race was officially started by Charlie Whiting's son, Justin Whiting, as a tribute to his father, who had died prior to the season opening 2019 Australian Grand Prix. Prior to the start of the race, Sebastian Vettel gave a brief speech in commemoration of Whiting.

=== Championship standings before the race ===
Heading into the race, Lewis Hamilton had a 31-point advantage over teammate Valtteri Bottas in the Drivers' Championship. In the Constructors' Championship, Mercedes held a 135-point advantage over Ferrari.

=== Entrants ===
The drivers and teams entered were the same as those on the season entry list with no additional stand-in drivers for either the race or practice.

== Practice ==
The first practice session ended with Pierre Gasly fastest for Red Bull almost half a second ahead of second placed Valtteri Bottas who was a further 0.4 seconds ahead of Gasly's teammate Max Verstappen. The only major incidents were Romain Grosjean crashing his car on the pit exit and Kimi Räikkönen's Alfa Romeo stopping on the Wellington straight, the latter of which brought out a red flag. The drivers all struggled with track grip levels throughout the session due to the track having been recently resurfaced for the second time in less than 16 months following controversy at the previous year's F1 and subsequently abandoned MotoGP rounds, and although there was some brief rain it had little impact on the running in the session.

== Qualifying ==
=== Qualifying classification ===
Pos.	Car no.	Driver	Constructor	Qualifying times			Final grid
Pos.	Car no.	Driver	Constructor	Q1	Q2	Q3	Final grid
1	77	(Finland) Valtteri Bottas	Mercedes	1:25.750	1:25.672	1:25.093	1
2	44	(United Kingdom) Lewis Hamilton	Mercedes	1:25.513	1:25.840	1:25.099	2
3	16	(Monaco) Charles Leclerc	Ferrari	1:25.533	1:25.546	1:25.172	3
4	33	(Netherlands) Max Verstappen	Red Bull Racing-Honda	1:25.700	1:25.848	1:25.276	4
5	10	(France) Pierre Gasly	Red Bull Racing-Honda	1:26.273	1:26.038	1:25.590	5
6	5	(Germany) Sebastian Vettel	Ferrari	1:25.898	1:26.023	1:25.787	6
7	3	(Australia) Daniel Ricciardo	Renault	1:26.428	1:26.283	1:26.182	7
8	4	(United Kingdom) Lando Norris	McLaren-Renault	1:26.079	1:26.385	1:26.224	8
9	23	(Thailand) Alexander Albon	Scuderia Toro Rosso-Honda	1:26.482	1:26.403	1:26.345	9
10	27	(Germany) Nico Hülkenberg	Renault	1:26.568	1:26.397	1:26.386	10
11	99	(Italy) Antonio Giovinazzi	Alfa Romeo Racing-Ferrari	1:26.449	1:26.519	N/A	11
12	7	(Finland) Kimi Räikkönen	Alfa Romeo Racing-Ferrari	1:26.558	1:26.546	N/A	12
13	55	(Spain) Carlos Sainz Jr.	McLaren-Renault	1:26.203	1:26.578	N/A	13
14	8	(France) Romain Grosjean	Haas-Ferrari	1:26.347	1:26.757	N/A	14
15	11	(Mexico) Sergio Pérez	Racing Point-BWT Mercedes	1:26.649	1:26.928	N/A	15
16	20	(Denmark) Kevin Magnussen	Haas-Ferrari	1:26.662	N/A	N/A	16
17	26	(Russia) Daniil Kvyat	Scuderia Toro Rosso-Honda	1:26.721	N/A	N/A	17
18	18	(Canada) Lance Stroll	Racing Point-BWT Mercedes	1:26.762	N/A	N/A	18
19	63	(United Kingdom) George Russell	Williams-Mercedes	1:27.789	N/A	N/A	19
20	88	(Poland) Robert Kubica	Williams-Mercedes	1:28.257	N/A	N/A	20
107% time: 1:31.498

== Race ==
=== Race summary ===
On Lap 1, the two Haas drivers collided at the exit of turn five. Both cars pitted, but both would go on to retire as a result of the damage, Kevin Magnussen on Lap 6 and Romain Grosjean on Lap 9. Valtteri Bottas and Lewis Hamilton fought for the lead, with Bottas maintaining 1st place until Lap 4, when Hamilton overtook at turn seven. Bottas then regained the lead shortly after at turn nine.

After battling for 3rd place in the preceding laps, Charles Leclerc and Max Verstappen entered the pits at the same time on Lap 14, with Leclerc ahead. The Red Bull pit stop was the faster of the two and Verstappen emerged in front after the two cars were side by side whilst driving through the pit-lane. However, this lead would not last, as Verstappen ran wide shortly after at turn 4, allowing Leclerc through.

Bottas pitted from the lead at the end of Lap 16, emerging behind Hamilton and Sebastian Vettel. Three laps later, Antonio Giovinazzi, who was running in 9th place, suffered a mechanical failure and spun into the gravel at turn 16. This incident brought out the safety car, allowing Hamilton an advantageous pit stop, maintaining the lead from Bottas. Other drivers including Vettel, Leclerc, Verstappen and Pierre Gasly also came into the pits.

Racing resumed on Lap 24. Sergio Pérez and Nico Hülkenberg made contact shortly after the restart, damaging Pérez's front wing. This forced Pérez to pit and caused him to eventually finish the race last of the running cars in 17th place. Verstappen and Leclerc continued to battle for position, until Verstappen began to pull away and was allowed through by his teammate Gasly, taking 4th place.

Leclerc overtook Gasly around the outside of turn 3 on Lap 36, taking 5th position. Shortly after, Verstappen took 3rd place from Vettel on the Hangar Straight. However, in an attempt to retake the position, Vettel locked up his brakes and collided with the back of the Red Bull at the entry to turn 16. Both cars spun into the gravel, but were able to escape and continue the race, with them both emerging behind Leclerc and Gasly. Vettel fell down the order over the remainder of the lap due to damage to his front wing, before pitting to have it replaced. He would go on to cross the line in 15th place, but was handed a 10-second penalty for causing a collision, demoting him to 16th.

Lewis Hamilton won the race for a record sixth time, claiming the extra point for recording the fastest lap of the race on his final lap, and setting a new lap record of 1:27.369.

On lap 12, for Pierre Gasly's pit stop, the Red Bull Racing team broke the record for the fastest pit stop time, with 1.91 seconds, beating the previous time of 1.92 seconds, which was jointly held by Red Bull and Williams and had stood since 2013.

=== Race classification ===
Pos.	No.	Driver	Constructor	Laps	Time/Retired	Grid	Points
1	44	(United Kingdom) Lewis Hamilton	Mercedes	52	1:21:08.452	2	26^{1}
2	77	(Finland) Valtteri Bottas	Mercedes	52	+24.928	1	18
3	16	(Monaco) Charles Leclerc	Ferrari	52	+30.117	3	15
4	10	(France) Pierre Gasly	Red Bull Racing-Honda	52	+34.692	5	12
5	33	(Netherlands) Max Verstappen	Red Bull Racing-Honda	52	+39.458	4	10
6	55	(Spain) Carlos Sainz Jr.	McLaren-Renault	52	+53.639	13	8
7	3	(Australia) Daniel Ricciardo	Renault	52	+54.401	7	6
8	7	(Finland) Kimi Räikkönen	Alfa Romeo Racing-Ferrari	52	+1:05.540	12	4
9	26	(Russia) Daniil Kvyat	Scuderia Toro Rosso-Honda	52	+1:06.720	17	2
10	27	(Germany) Nico Hülkenberg	Renault	52	+1:12.733	10	1
11	4	(United Kingdom) Lando Norris	McLaren-Renault	52	+1:14.281	8	
12	23	(Thailand) Alexander Albon	Scuderia Toro Rosso-Honda	52	+1:15.617	9	
13	18	(Canada) Lance Stroll	Racing Point-BWT Mercedes	52	+1:21.086	18	
14	63	(United Kingdom) George Russell	Williams-Mercedes	51	+1 lap	19	
15	88	(Poland) Robert Kubica	Williams-Mercedes	51	+1 lap	20	
16	5	(Germany) Sebastian Vettel	Ferrari	51	+1 lap^{2}	6	
17	11	(Mexico) Sergio Pérez	Racing Point-BWT Mercedes	51	+1 lap	15	
Ret	99	(Italy) Antonio Giovinazzi	Alfa Romeo Racing-Ferrari	18	Spun off	11	
Ret	8	(France) Romain Grosjean	Haas-Ferrari	9	Collision damage	14	
Ret	20	(Denmark) Kevin Magnussen	Haas-Ferrari	6	Collision damage	16	
Fastest lap: (United Kingdom) Lewis Hamilton (Mercedes) – 1:27.369 (lap 52)

Notes

- ^1 – Includes one point for fastest lap.
- ^2 – Sebastian Vettel originally finished 15th, but received a 10-second time penalty for causing a collision with Max Verstappen.

== Championship standings after the race ==
Drivers' Championship standings

Pos.	Driver	Points
1	(United Kingdom) Lewis Hamilton	223
2	(Finland) Valtteri Bottas	184
3	(Netherlands) Max Verstappen	136
4	(Germany) Sebastian Vettel	123
5	(Monaco) Charles Leclerc	120

Constructors' Championship standings

Pos.	Constructor	Points
1	(Germany) Mercedes	407
2	(Italy) Ferrari	243
3	(Austria) Red Bull Racing-Honda	191
4	(United Kingdom) McLaren-Renault	60
5	(France) Renault	39

== See also ==
- 2019 Silverstone Formula 2 round
- 2019 Silverstone Formula 3 round

Previous race: 2019 Austrian Grand Prix	FIA Formula One World Championship; 2019 season	Next race: 2019 German Grand Prix
Previous race: 2018 British Grand Prix	British Grand Prix	Next race: 2020 British Grand Prix
