= 2019 German Grand Prix =

Race 11 of 21 in the 2019 Formula One World Championship
← Previous race	Next race →
- The layout of the Hockenheimring

Race details
- Date: 28 July 2019
- Official name: Formula 1 Mercedes-Benz Grosser Preis von Deutschland 2019
- Location: Hockenheimring; Hockenheim, Germany
- Course: Permanent racing facility
- Course length: 4.574 km (2.842 miles)
- Distance: 64 laps, 292.736 km (181.897 miles)
- Scheduled distance: 67 laps, 306.458 km (190.424 miles)
- Weather: Early rain, Late clouds

Pole position
Driver	(United Kingdom) Lewis Hamilton	Mercedes
- Time: 1:11.767

Fastest lap
Driver	(Netherlands) Max Verstappen	Red Bull Racing-Honda
- Time: 1:16.645 on lap 61

Podium
First	(Netherlands) Max Verstappen	Red Bull Racing-Honda
Second	(Germany) Sebastian Vettel	Ferrari
Third	(Russia) Daniil Kvyat	Scuderia Toro Rosso-Honda

The 2019 German Grand Prix (formally known as the Formula 1 Mercedes-Benz Grosser Preis von Deutschland 2019) was a Formula One motor race which was held on 28 July 2019 at the Hockenheimring in Germany. The race was the 11th round of the 2019 Formula One World Championship and marked the 78th running of the German Grand Prix, and the 64th time the race had been run as a World Championship event since the inaugural season in 1950.

The race was won by Max Verstappen after starting second in a dramatic wet race. Pole-sitter Lewis Hamilton led the race until lap 29 when he crashed behind the safety car, losing the lead and his front wing as well as receiving a penalty for entering the pit lane on the wrong side of a safety bollard. Whilst behind the final safety car Daniil Kvyat and Lance Stroll switched to dry tyres before anyone else, allowing them to finish an unexpected third and fourth respectively, with the former scoring his final podium of his F1 career. Robert Kubica scored his final point in the sport with tenth place for Williams, which would also be the team's only point of their 2019 season.

As of 2026, this is the last German Grand Prix to be held in Formula One, as the race was not contracted for the 2020 season and beyond. It is also the last Formula One race to be held at Hockenheimring, as well as the last time a Russian driver stood on an F1 podium.

== Background ==
Officially known as the "Formula 1 Mercedes-Benz Großer Preis von Deutschland 2019", it was a Formula One race held on 28 July 2019. The event took place at the Hockenheimring near Hockenheim in Baden-Württemberg, Germany. It was the 11th round of 21 in the 2019 Formula One World Championship, the 78th running of the German Grand Prix and the 64th time it was run as part of the World Championship since the inaugural 1950 season.

Mercedes announced that they would be running a different livery in tribute to their heritage with the team as celebrating their 125th year of competing in motorsport, and their 200th F1 start. Racing Point announced that they would bring a “two step” upgrade package to the weekend and the struggling Williams team announced that they too would be bringing an upgrade package. Haas announced that they would have to split their car setups for the second race running as a result of the inter-team crash at the previous race in Britain with Kevin Magnussen's car also carrying extra upgrades.

=== Championship standings before the race ===
Heading into the weekend it was Lewis Hamilton and Mercedes who held a lead of 39 and 164 points in the drivers and constructors championships respectively. The size of their leads meant that both were confirmed to still be leading their respective championships after the weekend regardless of the race result.

=== Entrants ===
The drivers and teams entered were the same as those on the season entry list with no additional stand-in drivers for either the race or practice.

== Practice ==
Sebastian Vettel was fastest in the first practice session followed by Ferrari teammate Charles Leclerc in second with Lewis Hamilton third fastest. The session passed mostly without incident with the exception being Kevin Magnussen after his car failed causing a brief red flag. Ferrari managed to get first and second in the second practice session but this time with Leclerc leading Vettel by just over 1 tenth of a second, Hamilton once again finished the session in third. The session's only notable incident was Pierre Gasly crashing on the exit of turn 16.

== Qualifying ==
=== Qualifying classification ===
Pos.	Car no.	Driver	Constructor	Qualifying times			Final grid
Pos.	Car no.	Driver	Constructor	Q1	Q2	Q3	Final grid
1	44	(United Kingdom) Lewis Hamilton	Mercedes	1:12.852	1:12.149	1:11.767	1
2	33	(Netherlands) Max Verstappen	Red Bull Racing-Honda	1:12.593	1:12.427	1:12.113	2
3	77	(Finland) Valtteri Bottas	Mercedes	1:13.075	1:12.424	1:12.129	3
4	10	(France) Pierre Gasly	Red Bull Racing-Honda	1:12.991	1:12.385	1:12.522	4
5	7	(Finland) Kimi Räikkönen	Alfa Romeo Racing-Ferrari	1:13.066	1:12.519	1:12.538	5
6	8	(France) Romain Grosjean	Haas-Ferrari	1:13.146	1:12.769	1:12.851	6
7	55	(Spain) Carlos Sainz Jr.	McLaren-Renault	1:13.221	1:12.632	1:12.897	7
8	11	(Mexico) Sergio Pérez	Racing Point-BWT Mercedes	1:13.194	1:12.776	1:13.065	8
9	27	(Germany) Nico Hülkenberg	Renault	1:13.186	1:12.766	1:13.126	9
10	16	(Monaco) Charles Leclerc	Ferrari	1:12.229	1:12.344	No time	10
11	99	(Italy) Antonio Giovinazzi	Alfa Romeo Racing-Ferrari	1:13.170	1:12.786	N/A	11
12	20	(Denmark) Kevin Magnussen	Haas-Ferrari	1:13.103	1:12.789	N/A	12
13	3	(Australia) Daniel Ricciardo	Renault	1:13.131	1:12.799	N/A	13
14	26	(Russia) Daniil Kvyat	Scuderia Toro Rosso-Honda	1:13.278	1:13.135	N/A	14
15	18	(Canada) Lance Stroll	Racing Point-BWT Mercedes	1:13.256	1:13.450	N/A	15
16	4	(United Kingdom) Lando Norris	McLaren-Renault	1:13.333	N/A	N/A	19^{1}
17	23	(Thailand) Alexander Albon	Scuderia Toro Rosso-Honda	1:13.461	N/A	N/A	16
18	63	(United Kingdom) George Russell	Williams-Mercedes	1:14.721	N/A	N/A	17
19	88	(Poland) Robert Kubica	Williams-Mercedes	1:14.839	N/A	N/A	18
107% time: 1:17.285
—	5	(Germany) Sebastian Vettel	Ferrari	No time	N/A	N/A	20^{2}

Notes

- ^1 – Lando Norris was sent to the back of the grid after taking a third MGU-K, a third Energy Store and a third Control Electronics. However, because Norris set a qualifying lap time and Vettel did not, he would only drop three positions to 19th.
- ^2 – Sebastian Vettel failed to set a Q1 time within the 107% requirement but was given permission to race at the stewards' discretion. He also received a 10-place grid penalty for a third Control Electronics (CE), but his starting position remained unchanged as he was due to be starting from the back without the application of any penalties.

== Race ==
=== Race report ===
The race was scheduled for 67 laps with the formation lap due to start at 15:10 local time (13:10 UTC). A rule relevant to a race which has been declared as "wet" at its start was employed for the first time at this Grand Prix. The rule states that after the formation lap and zero or more additional laps behind the safety car, the race director has three options by which to proceed: a standing start without the safety car, a rolling start without the safety car, or suspending the race. The number of additional formation laps is subtracted from the overall race distance in all 3 instances.

==== Race start ====
Since at race time the track conditions were considered unsuitable due to heavy rain, all 20 cars were obligated to start on the wet tyres. After the formation lap and three additional laps behind the safety car, the race director elected to begin the grand prix with a standing start. Accordingly, the race distance was set to 64 laps, with all four laps behind the safety car at the beginning of the race officially scored as formation laps.

At the standing start the Red Bulls driven by Max Verstappen and Pierre Gasly were both very slow off the starting grid and lost several places each. Kimi Räikkönen took advantage, and ended up in third by the end of the first lap. Both Ferrari drivers had a first lap which saw them move up the order. Charles Leclerc who started in 10th was up to 6th, and Sebastian Vettel had improved from 20th to 14th. Verstappen, who had dropped down due to his start, passed Räikkönen for third immediately before Sergio Pérez spun off coming out of turn 10, he hit the wall on the inside taking him out of the race. This caused the race's first safety car to appear on lap two. As the track began to dry Vettel and Alexander Albon pitted for intermediate tyres, with the majority of the other cars doing the same on the following lap. The safety car period ended on lap 5.

Kevin Magnussen, Lance Stroll, Lando Norris, George Russell and Robert Kubica, all of whom stayed out on their wet tyres, quickly found themselves being overtaken by those on the intermediate tyres. All ultimately pitted for intermediates, but lost out for not having done so earlier dropping them to the back of the race. Daniel Ricciardo suffered an exhaust failure on lap 14, causing a virtual safety car. On lap 18, Carlos Sainz lost control of his McLaren at turn 16, causing it to run wide and aquaplane on the slippery, dragstrip area of the track, before narrowly avoiding the barriers. This caused a local yellow flag before he was able to drive off under his own power.

==== Lap 22 ====
By lap 22, the track had dried sufficiently that teams further down the order decided to risk slick tyres. The first driver to attempt them was Magnussen in his Haas on soft tyres, followed shortly after by Vettel. Verstappen pitted from third position and fitted the medium tyres. Valtteri Bottas then pitted on lap 27 from second and was also fitted with mediums. Almost immediately after Bottas pitted, Verstappen lost control of his car and performed a 360 degree spin at turn 14, but managed to recover.

Norris's car lost power on track on lap 26, prompting a second deployment of the virtual safety car. Many teams took the opportunity to pit their drivers for dry weather tires, including Leclerc and Lewis Hamilton. A notable exception was Sainz; with McLaren putting on a fresh set of intermediate tyres on his car. As Hamilton was leaving the pits on soft tyres, Leclerc spun into the tyre barrier at turn 17. He tried to drive out from the gravel, but his Ferrari SF90 was beached. This ended his race, and prompted the second full safety car of the day. At the end of the lap, Hamilton, now in the lead behind the safety car, also lost control at turn 17, damaging his front wing on the wall and returning into the pit lane cutting across the track as he did so. His Mercedes team was not ready for him, and Hamilton endured a 50.3 second pit stop in which his front wing was replaced and he had switched back onto intermediate tyres. It became clear to all teams at this point that dry weather tyres were not viable, and all teams were back on intermediate tyres by the time the second safety car period ended at lap 34.

==== Lap 34 ====
At the beginning of lap 34, the top five drivers in order were Verstappen, Nico Hülkenberg, Bottas, Albon and Hamilton. Vettel, who had started last, was now in 8th. Shortly after the safety car restart, Hamilton was found to have entered the pit lane on the wrong side of a safety bollard on lap 27, and was given a five-second penalty. Meanwhile, on track, Bottas and Hamilton overtook the cars ahead of them to race second and third respectively behind Verstappen. Räikkönen avoided beaching his car in a turn 17 gravel trap on lap 39, losing numerous places. One lap later, Hülkenberg slid into another gravel trap on the same corner, and was unable to free his car. This brought out the third safety car of the day. A few drivers including race leader Verstappen pitted during this safety car period; Verstappen's stop was notable as the fastest F1 pit stop time ever at 1.88 seconds, beating the previous time of 1.91 seconds, set during the 2019 British Grand Prix. All drivers who pitted during this safety car kept intermediate tyres, with one notable exception: Lance Stroll, who was the only driver to fit slick tyres. The third safety car period ended on lap 46.

==== Lap 46 ====
By this point in the race, the rain had stopped falling, and a clear dry line had formed on the track. Half the field pitted on lap 46 for dry weather tyres, including Verstappen and Bottas. Hamilton took the lead ahead of both. All the drivers remaining on intermediates, Hamilton included, pitted on lap 47 for slick tyres. Hamilton, because he had to serve his five-second penalty, was relegated to 12th position after his stop. Meanwhile, Stroll, the only driver to take slicks during the previous safety car, briefly inherited the lead of the race. Verstappen and then Daniil Kvyat soon passed him within a lap leaving Stroll in 3rd.

The next several laps of the race saw Verstappen extend his race lead to more than ten seconds. Sebastian Vettel, who had started lap 46 in 8th, began showing pace on dry tyres and moving through the midfield. Lewis Hamilton spun out at turn 1, narrowly avoiding the barriers, dropping down to 13th on lap 53. The field was frozen once again on lap 56, when Valtteri Bottas, running in 4th, slid off track and into a tyre barrier in a near identical spin to Hamilton a few laps earlier, suffering front suspension damage that would end his race. Verstappen's 10 second lead disappeared as Bottas's shunt brought out the fourth and final safety car of the race. Sebastian Vettel, who had by this point moved up to 5th position, found himself in a favorable position to attack the frontrunners heading into the final few laps.

==== Finish ====
The safety car caused by Bottas's crash ended on lap 60. Pierre Gasly's car suffered terminal damage when he collided with Albon two laps later. Verstappen extended his race lead once again, pulling over 7 seconds ahead of 2nd position by the final lap. Vettel was able to pass Sainz, Stroll, and Kvyat to finish in 2nd after starting the race in last. Kvyat, finishing 3rd, achieved Toro Rosso's first podium since Vettel's victory at the 2008 Italian Grand Prix. Verstappen won his second race of the last three, also picking up the point for fastest lap and the spectator voted "Driver of the Day" award. Phil Turner, Red Bull team chief mechanic joined him on the podium to receive the winning manufacturer's award. This was Kvyat's final career podium, and as of 2026, the last for a Russian driver.

=== After the race ===
After the race, both Alfa Romeo drivers Räikkönen and Antonio Giovinazzi were penalised 30 seconds for use of driver aids at the start. This relegated them to 12th and 13th, respectively. The penalties moved Hamilton up to 9th and prevented Mercedes from leaving the race without points for the first time since the 2018 Austrian Grand Prix. It further allowed Kubica, moved up to 10th, to earn his and Williams's first and what would prove to be the only point in Williams's 2019 campaign, as well as Kubica's final career point and the last achieved by a Polish driver. An appeal against the penalties was lodged by Alfa Romeo after the race and was subsequently dismissed by the FIA International Court of Appeal.

=== Race classification ===
Pos.	No.	Driver	Constructor	Laps	Time/Retired	Grid	Points
1	33	(Netherlands) Max Verstappen	Red Bull Racing-Honda	64	1:44:31.275	2	26^{1}
2	5	(Germany) Sebastian Vettel	Ferrari	64	+7.333	20	18
3	26	(Russia) Daniil Kvyat	Scuderia Toro Rosso-Honda	64	+8.305	14	15
4	18	(Canada) Lance Stroll	Racing Point-BWT Mercedes	64	+8.966	15	12
5	55	(Spain) Carlos Sainz Jr.	McLaren-Renault	64	+9.583	7	10
6	23	(Thailand) Alexander Albon	Scuderia Toro Rosso-Honda	64	+10.052	16	8
7	8	(France) Romain Grosjean	Haas-Ferrari	64	+16.838	6	6
8	20	(Denmark) Kevin Magnussen	Haas-Ferrari	64	+18.765	12	4
9	44	(United Kingdom) Lewis Hamilton	Mercedes	64	+19.667	1	2
10	88	(Poland) Robert Kubica	Williams-Mercedes	64	+24.987	18	1
11	63	(United Kingdom) George Russell	Williams-Mercedes	64	+26.404	17	
12	7	(Finland) Kimi Räikkönen	Alfa Romeo Racing-Ferrari	64	+42.214^{2}	5	
13	99	(Italy) Antonio Giovinazzi	Alfa Romeo Racing-Ferrari	64	+43.849^{2}	11	
14^{3}	10	(France) Pierre Gasly	Red Bull Racing-Honda	61	Collision	4	
Ret	77	(Finland) Valtteri Bottas	Mercedes	56	Accident	3	
Ret	27	(Germany) Nico Hülkenberg	Renault	39	Accident	9	
Ret	16	(Monaco) Charles Leclerc	Ferrari	27	Accident	10	
Ret	4	(United Kingdom) Lando Norris	McLaren-Renault	25	Power loss	19	
Ret	3	(Australia) Daniel Ricciardo	Renault	13	Exhaust	13	
Ret	11	(Mexico) Sergio Pérez	Racing Point-BWT Mercedes	1	Accident	8	
Fastest lap: (Netherlands) Max Verstappen (Red Bull Racing-Honda) – 1:16.645 (lap 61)

Notes

- ^1 – Includes one point for fastest lap.
- ^2 – Kimi Räikkönen and Antonio Giovinazzi originally finished 7th and 8th respectively, but both had 30 seconds added to their race times for use of driver aids at the start.
- ^3 – Pierre Gasly was classified as he completed more than 90% of the race distance.

== Championship standings after the race ==
Drivers' Championship standings

Pos.	Driver	Points
1	(United Kingdom) Lewis Hamilton	225
2	(Finland) Valtteri Bottas	184
3	(Netherlands) Max Verstappen	162
4	(Germany) Sebastian Vettel	141
5	(Monaco) Charles Leclerc	120

Constructors' Championship standings

	Pos.	Constructor	Points
	1	(Germany) Mercedes	409
	2	(Italy) Ferrari	261
	3	(Austria) Red Bull Racing-Honda	217
	4	(United Kingdom) McLaren-Renault	70
3	5	(Italy) Scuderia Toro Rosso-Honda	42

Note

- Only the top five positions for each set of standings are shown

Previous race: 2019 British Grand Prix	FIA Formula One World Championship; 2019 season	Next race: 2019 Hungarian Grand Prix
Previous race: 2018 German Grand Prix	German Grand Prix	Next race: None; Next race in Germany: 2020 Eifel Grand Prix
