= 2015 Deutsche Tourenwagen Masters =

German touring car championship season

Champions
- Drivers' Champion: Pascal Wehrlein
- Teams' Champion: HWA Team II
- Manufacturers' Championship: BMW

Seasons
- ← 2014 2016 →

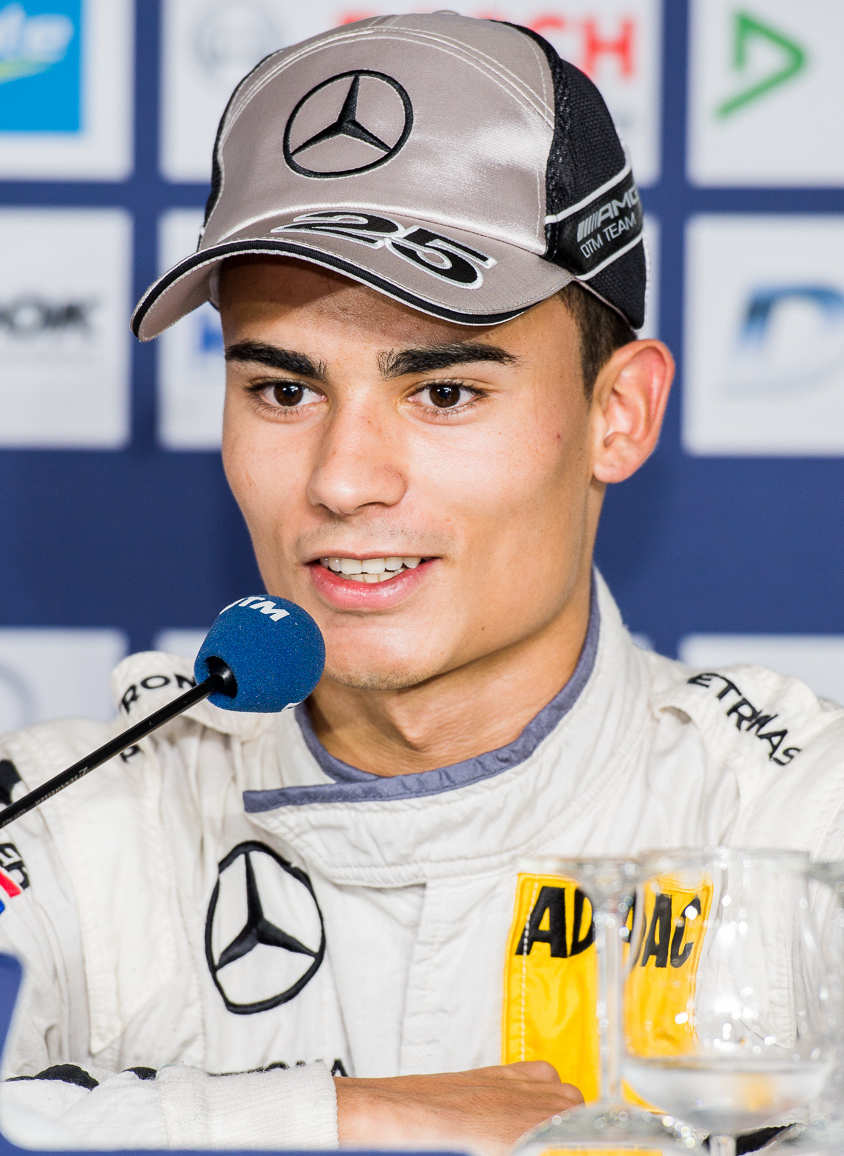
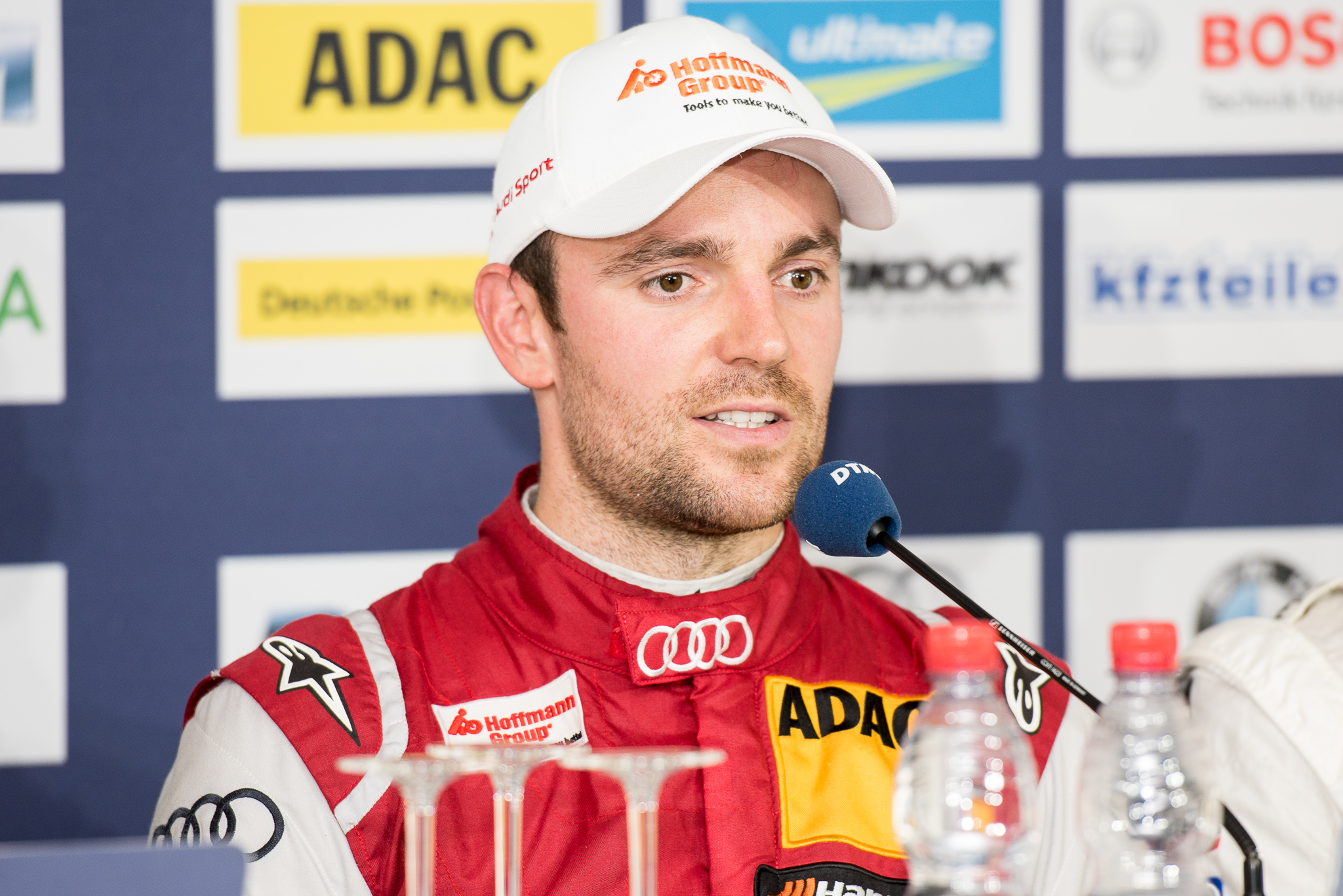
Pascal Wehrlein (left) won his first Deutsche Tourenwagen Masters Drivers' Championship, shortly before announcing his move to Formula One in 2016 while Jamie Green (right) finished second in the championship.

The 2015 Deutsche Tourenwagen Masters was the twenty-ninth season of premier German touring car championship and also sixteenth season under the moniker of Deutsche Tourenwagen Masters since the series' resumption in 2000. The season started on 2 May at Hockenheim, and ended on 18 October at the same venue, with Mercedes Benz driver Pascal Wehrlein clinching the Drivers' Championship, Mercedes Benz's HWA AG winning the Teams' Championship and BMW taking the Manufacturer's Championship after a total of nine events.

Marco Wittmann entered the season as the defending Drivers' Champion, BMW Team RMG as the defending Teams' Champion and Audi as the defending Manufacturers' Champion.

== Rule changes ==
=== Sporting ===
- Drivers were assigned permanent numbers for the duration of their DTM careers, with the championship adopting a system similar to the one used in Formula One and MotoGP. The number 1 was the champion's right, with drivers free to choose any number from 2 to 99 or 100; the champion's "regular" number was reserved while they were using the number 1.
- The 2015 season saw the DTM series go back to a two races per weekend format. It was the first time since 2002 that the DTM used the format but the usual number of laps were replaced by time limit.
- The usual knockout qualifying format was replaced by 20-minute single-session qualifying format (similar to 60-minute 1996-2002 Formula One single-session qualifying format).

=== Technical ===
- The weight of all DTM cars were increased to 1,120 kg.
- The performance weights also has been introduced.
- The softer optional tyres were removed to provide overtaking manoeuvre.

== Teams and drivers ==
The following manufacturers, teams and drivers competed in the 2015 Deutsche Tourenwagen Masters. All teams competed with tyres supplied by Hankook.

Manufacturer	Car	Team	No.	Drivers	Rounds
BMW	BMW M4 DTM	(Germany) BMW Team RMG	1	(Germany) Marco Wittmann	All
BMW	BMW M4 DTM	(Germany) BMW Team RMG	36	(Belgium) Maxime Martin	All
BMW	BMW M4 DTM	(Germany) BMW Team MTEK	7	(Canada) Bruno Spengler	All
BMW	BMW M4 DTM	(Germany) BMW Team MTEK	16	(Germany) Timo Glock	All
BMW	BMW M4 DTM	(Germany) BMW Team Schnitzer	13	(Portugal) António Félix da Costa	All
BMW	BMW M4 DTM	(Germany) BMW Team Schnitzer	77	(Germany) Martin Tomczyk	All
BMW	BMW M4 DTM	(Belgium) BMW Team RBM	18	(Brazil) Augusto Farfus	All
BMW	BMW M4 DTM	(Belgium) BMW Team RBM	31	(United Kingdom) Tom Blomqvist	All
Mercedes-Benz	Mercedes-AMG C63 DTM	(France) Euronics/BWT Mercedes-AMG	2	(United Kingdom) Gary Paffett	All
Mercedes-Benz	Mercedes-AMG C63 DTM	(France) Euronics/BWT Mercedes-AMG	22	(Austria) Lucas Auer	All
Mercedes-Benz	Mercedes-AMG C63 DTM	(Germany) Silberpfeil Energy Mercedes-AMG	3	(United Kingdom) Paul di Resta	All
Mercedes-Benz	Mercedes-AMG C63 DTM	(Germany) Silberpfeil Energy Mercedes-AMG	6	(Canada) Robert Wickens	All
Mercedes-Benz	Mercedes-AMG C63 DTM	(Germany) gooix/Original-Teile Mercedes-AMG	8	(Germany) Christian Vietoris	All
Mercedes-Benz	Mercedes-AMG C63 DTM	(Germany) gooix/Original-Teile Mercedes-AMG	94	(Germany) Pascal Wehrlein	All
Mercedes-Benz	Mercedes-AMG C63 DTM	(Germany) Petronas Mercedes-AMG	12	(Spain) Daniel Juncadella (Note: Reserve driver Esteban Ocon participated in FP1 in the second Hockenheim round due to Daniel Juncadella being ill with food poisoning.)	All
Mercedes-Benz	Mercedes-AMG C63 DTM	(Germany) Petronas Mercedes-AMG	84	(Germany) Maximilian Götz	All
Audi	Audi RS5 DTM	(Germany) Audi Sport Team Abt Sportsline	5	(Sweden) Mattias Ekström	All
Audi	Audi RS5 DTM	(Germany) Audi Sport Team Abt Sportsline	17	(Spain) Miguel Molina	All
Audi	Audi RS5 DTM	(Germany) Audi Sport Team Abt	27	(France) Adrien Tambay	All
Audi	Audi RS5 DTM	(Germany) Audi Sport Team Abt	48	(Italy) Edoardo Mortara	All
Audi	Audi RS5 DTM	(Germany) Audi Sport Team Phoenix	10	(Germany) Timo Scheider	1–5, 7–9
Audi	Audi RS5 DTM	(Germany) Audi Sport Team Phoenix	93	(Italy) Antonio Giovinazzi	6
Audi	Audi RS5 DTM	(Germany) Audi Sport Team Phoenix	99	(Germany) Mike Rockenfeller	All
Audi	Audi RS5 DTM	(Germany) Audi Sport Team Rosberg	51	(Switzerland) Nico Müller	All
Audi	Audi RS5 DTM	(Germany) Audi Sport Team Rosberg	53	(United Kingdom) Jamie Green	All

=== Team changes ===
- ART Grand Prix joined the series in 2015, and ran a Mercedes works team of two cars, for Lucas Auer and Gary Paffett.

=== Driver changes ===
Entering DTM

- Maximilian Götz, who won the 2014 Blancpain Sprint Series, joined Mercedes-Benz.
- European Formula 3 front-runners Lucas Auer and Tom Blomqvist joined the series, driving for Mercedes-Benz and BMW respectively.

Leaving DTM

- Joey Hand, who drove for BMW between 2012 and 2014, left the series and joined the United SportsCar Championship.
- Vitaly Petrov, who drove for Mercedes-Benz in 2014, left the series.

Mid-season changes

- Timo Scheider was excluded from participating in the Moscow Raceway round after pushing out both Robert Wickens and Pascal Wehrlein in the second race of the Red Bull Ring. European Formula 3 front-runner Antonio Giovinazzi replaced him at the Russian venue for Audi Sport Team Phoenix.

== Performance weights ==
Starting from Norisring, ITR introduced a system of ballast based on the results obtained in the previous race. The basis weight is 1120 kg, and performance weight ranges from a minimum of 1105 kg to a maximum of 1140 kg

Driver	Car	Norisring	Zandvoort	Red Bull Ring	Moscow	Oschersleben	Nürburgring	Hockenheim
(Germany) Marco Wittmann	BMW	1105 kg	1105 kg	1115 kg	1107,5 kg	1107,5 kg	1117,5 kg	1117,5 kg
(United Kingdom) Gary Paffett	Mercedes-Benz	1120 kg	1130 kg	1125 kg	1125 kg	1127,5 kg	1127,5 kg	1127,5 kg
(United Kingdom) Paul di Resta	Mercedes-Benz	1120 kg	1127,5 kg	1122,5 kg	1122,5 kg	1120 kg	1120 kg	1120 kg
(Sweden) Mattias Ekström	Audi	1137,5 kg	1130 kg	1127,5 kg	1137,5 kg	1137,5 kg	1127,5 kg	1127,5 kg
(Canada) Robert Wickens	Mercedes-Benz	1120 kg	1130 kg	1125 kg	1125 kg	1122,5 kg	1122,5 kg	1122,5 kg
(Canada) Bruno Spengler	BMW	1105 kg	1105 kg	1115 kg	1105 kg	1105 kg	1115 kg	1115 kg
(Germany) Christian Vietoris	Mercedes-Benz	1120 kg	1130 kg	1125 kg	1125 kg	1122,5 kg	1122,5 kg	1122,5 kg
(Germany) Timo Scheider	Audi	1135 kg	1125 kg	1120 kg	-	1125 kg	1115 kg	1115 kg
(Spain) Daniel Juncadella	Mercedes-Benz	1120 kg	1130 kg	1125 kg	1125 kg	1125 kg	1125 kg	1130 kg
(Portugal) António Félix da Costa	BMW	1105 kg	1105 kg	1115 kg	1107,5 kg	1107,5 kg	1117,5 kg	1117,5 kg
(Germany) Timo Glock	BMW	1105 kg	1105 kg	1115 kg	1105 kg	1105 kg	1115 kg	1115 kg
(Spain) Miguel Molina	Audi	1135 kg	1125 kg	1120 kg	1125 kg	1122,5 kg	1115 kg	1115 kg
(Brazil) Augusto Farfus	BMW	1105 kg	1105 kg	1115 kg	1107,5 kg	1107,5 kg	1117,5 kg	1117,5 kg
(Austria) Lucas Auer	Mercedes-Benz	1120 kg	1127,5 kg	1122,5 kg	1122,5 kg	1120 kg	1120 kg	1120 kg
(France) Adrien Tambay	Audi	1130 kg	1120 kg	1117,5 kg	1125 kg	1122,5 kg	1112,5 kg	1112,5 kg
(United Kingdom) Tom Blomqvist	BMW	1105 kg	1105 kg	1112,5 kg	1105 kg	1105 kg	1115 kg	1115 kg
(Belgium) Maxime Martin	BMW	1107,5 kg	1107,5 kg	1115 kg	1105 kg	1105 kg	1112,5 kg	1112,5 kg
(Italy) Edoardo Mortara	Audi	1140 kg	1130 kg	1125 kg	1135 kg	1137,5 kg	1127,5 kg	1127,5 kg
(Switzerland) Nico Müller	Audi	1135 kg	1125 kg	1120 kg	1127,5 kg	1130 kg	1120 kg	1120 kg
(United Kingdom) Jamie Green	Audi	1137,5 kg	1130 kg	1125 kg	1130 kg	1132,5 kg	1125 kg	1125 kg
(Germany) Martin Tomczyk	BMW	1105 kg	1105 kg	1110 kg	1105 kg	1105 kg	1112,5 kg	1112,5 kg
(Germany) Maximilian Götz	Mercedes-Benz	1120 kg	1125 kg	1120 kg	1120 kg	1117,5 kg	1117,5 kg	1117,5 kg
(Germany) Pascal Wehrlein	Mercedes-Benz	1120 kg	1130 kg	1127,5 kg	1127,5 kg	1130 kg	1130 kg	1130 kg
(Italy) Antonio Giovinazzi	Audi	-	-	-	1137,5 kg	-	-	-
(Germany) Mike Rockenfeller	Audi	1140 kg	1130 kg	1125 kg	1135 kg	1137,5 kg	1127,5 kg	1127,5 kg

== Race calendar and results ==
The nine event calendar was announced on 3 December 2014.

Round		Circuit	Date	Pole position	Fastest lap	Winning driver	Winning team	Winning manufacturer
1	R1	(Germany) Hockenheimring, Baden-Württemberg	2 May	(United Kingdom) Jamie Green	(United Kingdom) Paul di Resta	(United Kingdom) Jamie Green	Audi Sport Team Rosberg	Audi
1	R2	(Germany) Hockenheimring, Baden-Württemberg	3 May	(Germany) Mike Rockenfeller	(Germany) Timo Scheider	(Sweden) Mattias Ekström	Audi Sport Team Abt Sportsline	Audi
2	R1	(Germany) Lausitzring, Brandenburg	30 May	(Spain) Miguel Molina	(United Kingdom) Jamie Green	(United Kingdom) Jamie Green	Audi Sport Team Rosberg	Audi
2	R2	(Germany) Lausitzring, Brandenburg	31 May	(United Kingdom) Jamie Green	(United Kingdom) Jamie Green	(United Kingdom) Jamie Green	Audi Sport Team Rosberg	Audi
3	R1	(Germany) Norisring, Nuremberg	27 June	(Germany) Christian Vietoris	(United Kingdom) Jamie Green	(Germany) Pascal Wehrlein	gooix/Original-Teile Mercedes-AMG	Mercedes-Benz
3	R2	(Germany) Norisring, Nuremberg	28 June	(Canada) Bruno Spengler	(Canada) Robert Wickens	(Canada) Robert Wickens	Silberpfeil Energy Mercedes-AMG	Mercedes-Benz
4	R1	(Netherlands) Circuit Park Zandvoort, North Holland	11 July	(Brazil) Augusto Farfus	(Portugal) António Félix da Costa	(Germany) Marco Wittmann	BMW Team RMG	BMW
4	R2	(Netherlands) Circuit Park Zandvoort, North Holland	12 July	(Portugal) António Félix da Costa	(Germany) Timo Glock	(Portugal) António Félix da Costa	BMW Team Schnitzer	BMW
5	R1	(Austria) Red Bull Ring, Spielberg	1 August	(Italy) Edoardo Mortara	(Italy) Edoardo Mortara	(Italy) Edoardo Mortara	Audi Sport Team Abt	Audi
5	R2	(Austria) Red Bull Ring, Spielberg	2 August	(Sweden) Mattias Ekström	(Sweden) Mattias Ekström	(Sweden) Mattias Ekström	Audi Sport Team Abt Sportsline	Audi
6	R1	(Russia) Moscow Raceway, Volokolamsk	29 August	(Germany) Marco Wittmann	(Germany) Pascal Wehrlein	(Germany) Pascal Wehrlein	gooix/Original-Teile Mercedes-AMG	Mercedes-Benz
6	R2	(Russia) Moscow Raceway, Volokolamsk	30 August	(Germany) Mike Rockenfeller	(Germany) Mike Rockenfeller	(Germany) Mike Rockenfeller	Audi Sport Team Phoenix	Audi
7	R1	(Germany) Motorsport Arena Oschersleben, Saxony-Anhalt	12 September	(Germany) Timo Glock	(Germany) Timo Glock	(Germany) Timo Glock	BMW Team MTEK	BMW
7	R2	(Germany) Motorsport Arena Oschersleben, Saxony-Anhalt	13 September	(Brazil) Augusto Farfus	(United Kingdom) Tom Blomqvist	(United Kingdom) Tom Blomqvist	BMW Team RBM	BMW
8	R1	(Germany) Nürburgring, Rhineland-Palatinate	26 September	(Austria) Lucas Auer	(Belgium) Maxime Martin	(Belgium) Maxime Martin	BMW Team RMG	BMW
8	R2	(Germany) Nürburgring, Rhineland-Palatinate	27 September	(Spain) Miguel Molina	(Spain) Miguel Molina	(Spain) Miguel Molina	Audi Sport Team Abt Sportsline	Audi
9	R1	(Germany) Hockenheimring, Baden-Württemberg	17 October	(Belgium) Maxime Martin	(Germany) Timo Scheider	(Germany) Timo Scheider	Audi Sport Team Phoenix	Audi
9	R2	(Germany) Hockenheimring, Baden-Württemberg	18 October	(United Kingdom) Gary Paffett	(Italy) Edoardo Mortara	(United Kingdom) Jamie Green	Audi Sport Team Rosberg	Audi

=== Calendar changes ===
- The round at the Hungaroring – which had been included on the DTM calendar in 1988 and 2014 – was discontinued.

== Championship standings ==
Scoring system

Points were awarded to the top ten classified finishers as follows:

Position	**1st**	**2nd**	**3rd**	**4th**	**5th**	**6th**	**7th**	**8th**	**9th**	**10th**
Points	25	18	15	12	10	8	6	4	2	1

=== Drivers' championship ===
Pos.	Driver	HOC (Germany)		LAU (Germany)		NOR (Germany)		ZAN (Netherlands)		RBR (Austria)		MSC (Russia)		OSC (Germany)		NÜR (Germany)		HOC (Germany)		Points
1	(Germany) Pascal Wehrlein	2	8	5	13	1	5	10	6	2	21†	1	10	5	5	3	5	8	20	169
2	(United Kingdom) Jamie Green	**1**	13	1	**1**	7	18	Ret	13	Ret	17	4	5	Ret	8	Ret	17	2	1	150
3	(Sweden) Mattias Ekström	12	1	3	2	17	4	13	7	5	**1**	Ret	3	14	11	10	11	9	2	147
4	(Italy) Edoardo Mortara	4	2	2	5	11	15	Ret	Ret	**1**	3	6	8	19†	Ret	2	Ret	Ret	3	143
5	(Canada) Bruno Spengler	11	9	11	19	5	**3**	5	3	15	15	3	2	2	10	19†	3	19†	8	123
6	(Germany) Marco Wittmann	9	5	13	17	9	13	1	5	9	11	**2**	7	6	3	7	18	6	Ret	112
7	(Belgium) Maxime Martin	7	14	7	8	Ret	10	3	17	14	19	18	4	11	9	1	13	**3**	6	94
8	(United Kingdom) Paul di Resta	3	22	14	15	Ret	6	Ret	14	3	9	14	15	13	6	12	2	4	4	90
9	(United Kingdom) Gary Paffett	Ret	3	23	Ret	3	7	11	10	7	2	7	6	Ret	13	4	Ret	Ret	**9**	89
10	(Germany) Mike Rockenfeller	5	**6**	9	10	14	Ret	8	11	8	4	10	**1**	Ret	19	11	7	5	15	83
11	(Portugal) António Félix da Costa	13	20	19	14	12	12	2	**1**	13	10	11	22	3	4	9	15	11	7	79
12	(Brazil) Augusto Farfus	10	21	Ret	Ret	8	Ret	**4**	2	6	18	15	11	4	**2**	18	8	Ret	14	77
13	(Canada) Robert Wickens	Ret	7	6	18	2	1	Ret	19	Ret	20†	12	23	Ret	16	8	Ret	Ret	18	61
14	(United Kingdom) Tom Blomqvist	Ret	17	22	Ret	Ret	DSQ	7	18	17	22†	8	12	7	1	Ret	4	7	17	59
15	(Germany) Timo Glock	8	10	18	12	13	Ret	6	4	19	14	Ret	17	**1**	7	13	20	18†	21	56
16	(Germany) Christian Vietoris	14	11	17	7	**4**	2	12	8	4	8	Ret	20	18	21	15	14	12	Ret	56
17	(Spain) Miguel Molina	Ret	18	**4**	3	20	17	Ret	12	18	13	Ret	14	9	Ret	Ret	**1**	17	11	54
18	(Germany) Timo Scheider	Ret	12	8	4	16	16	14	15	16	DSQ			12	12	Ret	Ret	1	5	51
19	(Germany) Martin Tomczyk	Ret	4	12	11	6	11	Ret	Ret	Ret	12	17	Ret	8	20	WD	9	15	10	27
20	(Spain) Daniel Juncadella	Ret	15	10	6	10	8	16	Ret	11	23†	5	13	10	15	17	10	13	12	26
21	(Switzerland) Nico Müller	6	19	20	9	18	19†	9	21†	12	5	9	9	Ret	Ret	16	16	14	16	26
22	(Germany) Maximilian Götz	16	16	15	16	Ret	Ret	15	16	20	7	16	18	16	18	5	6	10	13	25
23	(Austria) Lucas Auer	Ret	DNS	21	21†	15	9	17	20	21	6	13	19	15	17	**6**	19	16	19	18
24	(France) Adrien Tambay	15	Ret	16	20†	19	14	18	9	10	16	Ret	16	17	14	14	12	Ret	Ret	3
25	(Italy) Antonio Giovinazzi											19	21							0
Pos.	Driver	HOC (Germany)		LAU (Germany)		NOR (Germany)		ZAN (Netherlands)		RBR (Austria)		MSC (Russia)		OSC (Germany)		NÜR (Germany)		HOC (Germany)		Points

Colour	Result
Gold	Winner
Silver	Second place
Bronze	Third place
Green	Points classification
Blue	Non-points classification
Blue	Non-classified finish (NC)
Purple	Retired, not classified (Ret)
Red	Did not qualify (DNQ)
Red	Did not pre-qualify (DNPQ)
Black	Disqualified (DSQ)
White	Did not start (DNS)
White	Withdrew (WD)
White	Race cancelled (C)
Blank	Did not practice (DNP)
Blank	Did not arrive (DNA)
Blank	Excluded (EX)

**Bold** – Pole
Italics – Fastest Lap

- † — Driver retired, but was classified as they completed 75% of the winner's race distance.

=== Teams' championship ===
Pos.	Team	Car	HOC (Germany)		LAU (Germany)		NOR (Germany)		ZAN (Netherlands)		RBR (Austria)		MSC (Russia)		OSC (Germany)		NÜR (Germany)		HOC (Germany)		Points
1	gooix/Original-Teile Mercedes-AMG	8	14	11	17	7	4	2	12	8	4	8	Ret	20	18	21	15	14	12	Ret	225
1	gooix/Original-Teile Mercedes-AMG	94	2	8	5	13	1	5	10	6	2	21†	1	10	5	5	3	5	8	20	225
2	BMW Team RMG	1	9	5	13	17	9	13	1	5	9	11	**2**	7	6	3	7	18	6	Ret	206
2	BMW Team RMG	36	7	14	7	8	Ret	10	3	17	14	19	18	4	11	9	1	13	3	6	206
3	Audi Sport Team Abt Sportsline	5	12	1	3	2	17	4	13	7	5	**1**	Ret	3	14	11	10	11	9	2	201
3	Audi Sport Team Abt Sportsline	17	Ret	18	**4**	3	20	17	Ret	12	18	13	Ret	14	9	Ret	Ret	**1**	17	11	201
4	BMW Team MTEK	7	11	9	11	19	5	**3**	5	3	15	15	3	2	2	10	19†	3	19†	8	179
4	BMW Team MTEK	16	8	10	18	12	13	Ret	6	4	19	14	Ret	17	**1**	7	13	20	18†	21	179
5	Audi Sport Team Rosberg	51	6	19	20	9	18	19†	9	21†	12	5	9	9	Ret	Ret	16	16	14	16	176
5	Audi Sport Team Rosberg	53	**1**	13	1	**1**	7	18	Ret	13	Ret	17	4	5	Ret	8	Ret	17	2	1	176
6	Silberpfeil Energy Mercedes-AMG	3	3	22	14	15	Ret	6	Ret	14	3	9	14	15	13	6	12	2	4	4	151
6	Silberpfeil Energy Mercedes-AMG	6	Ret	7	6	18	2	1	Ret	19	Ret	20†	12	23	Ret	16	8	Ret	Ret	18	151
7	Audi Sport Team Abt	27	15	Ret	16	20†	19	14	18	9	10	16	Ret	16	17	14	14	12	Ret	Ret	146
7	Audi Sport Team Abt	48	4	2	2	5	11	15	Ret	Ret	**1**	3	6	8	19†	Ret	2	Ret	Ret	3	146
8	BMW Team RBM	18	10	21	Ret	Ret	8	Ret	**4**	2	6	18	15	11	4	**2**	18	8	Ret	14	136
8	BMW Team RBM	31	Ret	17	22	Ret	Ret	DSQ	7	18	17	22†	8	12	7	1	Ret	4	7	17	136
9	Audi Sport Team Phoenix	10	Ret	12	8	4	16	16	14	15	16	DSQ			12	12	Ret	Ret	1	5	134
9	Audi Sport Team Phoenix	93											19	21							134
9	Audi Sport Team Phoenix	99	5	**6**	9	10	14	Ret	8	11	8	4	10	**1**	Ret	19	11	7	5	15	134
10	Euronics/BWT Mercedes-AMG	2	Ret	3	23	Ret	3	7	11	10	7	2	7	6	Ret	13	4	Ret	Ret	**9**	107
10	Euronics/BWT Mercedes-AMG	22	Ret	DNS	21	21†	15	9	17	20	21	6	13	19	15	17	**6**	19	16	19	107
11	BMW Team Schnitzer	13	13	20	19	14	12	12	2	**1**	13	10	11	22	3	4	9	15	11	7	106
11	BMW Team Schnitzer	77	Ret	4	12	11	6	11	Ret	Ret	Ret	12	17	Ret	8	20	WD	9	15	10	106
12	Petronas Mercedes-AMG	12	Ret	15	10	6	10	8	16	Ret	11	23†	5	13	10	15	17	10	13	12	51
12	Petronas Mercedes-AMG	84	16	16	15	16	Ret	Ret	15	16	20	7	16	18	16	18	5	6	10	13	51
Pos.	Driver	Car	HOC (Germany)		LAU (Germany)		NOR (Germany)		ZAN (Netherlands)		RBR (Austria)		MSC (Russia)		OSC (Germany)		NÜR (Germany)		HOC (Germany)		Points

Colour	Result
Gold	Winner
Silver	Second place
Bronze	Third place
Green	Points classification
Blue	Non-points classification
Blue	Non-classified finish (NC)
Purple	Retired, not classified (Ret)
Red	Did not qualify (DNQ)
Red	Did not pre-qualify (DNPQ)
Black	Disqualified (DSQ)
White	Did not start (DNS)
White	Withdrew (WD)
White	Race cancelled (C)
Blank	Did not practice (DNP)
Blank	Did not arrive (DNA)
Blank	Excluded (EX)

**Bold** – Pole
Italics – Fastest Lap

=== Manufacturers' championship ===
Pos.	Driver	HOC (Germany)		LAU (Germany)		NOR (Germany)		ZAN (Netherlands)		RBR (Austria)		MSC (Russia)		OSC (Germany)		NÜR (Germany)		HOC (Germany)		Points
1	BMW	13	25	6	4	24	16	69	80	10	1	37	36	88	79	33	33	29	19	602
2	Audi	55	51	76	83	6	12	6	8	40	0	23	56	2	4	19	31	55	68	595
3	Mercedes-Benz	33	25	19	14	71	73	1	13	51	38	41	9	11	18	49	37	17	14	534
Pos.	Driver	HOC (Germany)		LAU (Germany)		NOR (Germany)		ZAN (Netherlands)		RBR (Austria)		MSC (Russia)		OSC (Germany)		NÜR (Germany)		HOC (Germany)		Points

== Bibliography ==
- Klein, Sebastian (4 December 2015). DTM 2015: Das offizielle Jahrbuch. Duisburg: Gruppe C Motorsport Verlag. ISBN 978-3-928540-83-4.
