= 2025 8 Hours of Bahrain =

Sports car endurance race

Event information
- Round 8 of 8 in the 2025 FIA World Endurance Championship
- Date: 8 November 2025
- Location: Sakhir
- Venue: Bahrain International Circuit
- Duration: 8 Hours
- Weather: Dry. Air temperature: 24.1–30.0 °C (75.4–86.0 °F). Track temperature: 25.0–38.2 °C (77.0–100.8 °F)

Results
- Laps completed: 237
- Distance (km): 1,282.64
- Distance (miles): 797.03
- Hypercar

Pole position
- Time: 1:46.826
- Team: (Japan) Toyota Gazoo Racing
- Drivers: (Japan) Kamui Kobayashi

Winners
- Team: (Japan) Toyota Gazoo Racing
- Drivers: (United Kingdom) Mike Conway (Japan) Kamui Kobayashi (Netherlands) Nyck de Vries
- LMGT3

Winners
- Team: (France) Akkodis ASP Team
- Drivers: (Argentina) José María López (Austria) Clemens Schmid (Romania) Răzvan Umbrărescu

The 2025 8 Hours of Bahrain (officially known as the 2025 Bapco Energies 8 Hours of Bahrain) was an endurance sportscar racing event held on 8 November 2025, as the eighth and final round of the 2025 FIA World Endurance Championship. It was the fourteenth running of the event, and the seventh running of the event in an extended 8-hour format.

== Entry list ==
36 cars entered the race: 18 in Hypercar and 18 in LMGT3. In Hypercar, Laurin Heinrich makes his debut in the No. 5 Porsche while Matt Campbell returns to the sister No. 6 Porsche. Ross Gunn and Roman De Angelis also rejoin the No. 007 and No. 009 Aston Martin entries respectively. Théo Pourchaire replaces Stoffel Vandoorne in the No. 94 Peugeot.

== Schedule ==
Date	Time (local: AST)	Event
Thursday, 6 November	12:15	Free Practice 1
Thursday, 6 November	17:00	Free Practice 2
Friday, 7 November	12:00	Free Practice 3
Friday, 7 November	16:00	Qualifying - LMGT3
Friday, 7 November	16:20	Hyperpole - LMGT3
Friday, 7 November	16:40	Qualifying - Hypercar
Friday, 7 November	17:00	Hyperpole - Hypercar
Saturday, 8 November	14:00	Race

== Practice ==
Three practice sessions were held before the event: two were held on Thursday, and one was held on Friday. The sessions on Thursday lasted 90 minutes, and the session on Friday lasted 60 minutes.

=== Practice 1 ===
Class	No.	Entrant	Driver	Time
Hypercar	009	(United States) Aston Martin THOR Team	(Denmark) Marco Sørensen	1:49.697
LMGT3	77	(Germany) Proton Competition	(United Kingdom) Ben Barker	2:02.681

- Note: Only the fastest car in each class is shown.

=== Practice 2 ===
Class	No.	Entrant	Driver	Time
Hypercar	009	(United States) Aston Martin THOR Team	(Denmark) Marco Sørensen	1:49.042
LMGT3	78	(France) Akkodis ASP Team	(Germany) Finn Gehrsitz	2:02.613

- Note: Only the fastest car in each class is shown.

=== Practice 3 ===
Class	No.	Entrant	Driver	Time
Hypercar	50	(Italy) Ferrari AF Corse	(Italy) Antonio Fuoco	1:49.725
LMGT3	61	(Italy) Iron Lynx	(Australia) Martin Berry	2:03.158

- Note: Only the fastest car in each class is shown.

== Qualifying ==
Qualifying started at 16:00 AST on Friday, with one fifteen-minute qualifying session and one twelve-minute hyperpole session per class, resulting in two qualifying and two hyperpole sessions in total. Kamui Kobayashi claimed pole position in the No. 7 Toyota with a time of 1:46.826, ahead of the sister No. 8 Toyota, giving the Japanese marque its first pole position of the season.

=== Qualifying results ===
Pole position winners in each class are marked in bold.

Pos	Class	No.	Entrant	Qualifying	Hyperpole	Grid
1	**Hypercar**	**7**	**(Japan) Toyota Gazoo Racing**	**1:47.500**	**1:46.826**	1
2	Hypercar	8	(Japan) Toyota Gazoo Racing	1:47.836	1:46.977	2
3	Hypercar	94	(France) Peugeot TotalEnergies	1:48.072	1:47.166	3
4	Hypercar	93	(France) Peugeot TotalEnergies	1:47.643	1:47.208	4
5	Hypercar	12	(United States) Cadillac Hertz Team Jota	1:47.881	1:47.543	5
6	Hypercar	009	(United States) Aston Martin THOR Team	1:47.421	1:47.624	6
7	Hypercar	51	(Italy) Ferrari AF Corse	1:47.949	1:47.726	7
8	Hypercar	5	(Germany) Porsche Penske Motorsport	1:48.137	1:47.870	8
9	Hypercar	007	(United States) Aston Martin THOR Team	1:47.290	1:48.036	9
10	Hypercar	15	(Germany) BMW M Team WRT	1:47.872	1:48.136	10
11	Hypercar	50	(Italy) Ferrari AF Corse	1:48.176		11
12	Hypercar	83	(Italy) AF Corse	1:48.186		12
13	Hypercar	36	(France) Alpine Endurance Team	1:48.217		13
14	Hypercar	38	(United States) Cadillac Hertz Team Jota	1:48.392		14
15	Hypercar	35	(France) Alpine Endurance Team	1:48.470		15
16	Hypercar	20	(Germany) BMW M Team WRT	1:48.716		16
17	Hypercar	99	(Germany) Proton Competition	1:48.914		17
18	Hypercar	6	(Germany) Porsche Penske Motorsport	1:49.157		18
19	**LMGT3**	**78**	**(France) Akkodis ASP Team**	**2:03.021**	**2:01.661**	19
20	LMGT3	60	(Italy) Iron Lynx	2:03.654	2:01.987	20
21	LMGT3	61	(Italy) Iron Lynx	2:02.991	2:02.017	21
22	LMGT3	87	(France) Akkodis ASP Team	2:03.371	2:02.219	22
23	LMGT3	31	(Belgium) The Bend Team WRT	2:03.493	2:02.427	23
24	LMGT3	27	(United States) Heart of Racing Team	2:03.361	2:02.624	24
25	LMGT3	88	(Germany) Proton Competition	2:03.173	2:02.717	25
26	LMGT3	21	(Italy) Vista AF Corse	2:03.536	2:02.763	26
27	LMGT3	46	(Belgium) Team WRT	2:03.534	2:03.067	27
28	LMGT3	59	(United Kingdom) United Autosports	2:03.626	2:03.531	31
29	LMGT3	33	(United Kingdom) TF Sport	2:03.675		28
30	LMGT3	95	(United Kingdom) United Autosports	2:03.710		29
31	LMGT3	77	(Germany) Proton Competition	2:03.938		30
32	LMGT3	81	(United Kingdom) TF Sport	2:04.230		32
33	LMGT3	10	(France) Racing Spirit of Léman	2:04.322		33
34	LMGT3	54	(Italy) Vista AF Corse	2:04.462		34
35	LMGT3	92	(Germany) Manthey 1st Phorm	2:04.520		35
36	LMGT3	85	(Italy) Iron Dames	2:04.992		36

== Race ==
The race started at 14:00 AST on Saturday, running for 8 hours.

=== Race results ===
Class winners are in bold and ‡.

Pos	Class	No	Team	Drivers	Chassis	Tyre	Laps	Time/Retired
Pos	Class	No	Team	Drivers	Engine	Tyre	Laps	Time/Retired
1	**Hypercar**	**7**	**(Japan) Toyota Gazoo Racing**	**(United Kingdom) Mike Conway** **(Japan) Kamui Kobayashi** **(Netherlands) Nyck de Vries**	**Toyota GR010 Hybrid**	MI	**237**	**8:01:08.626‡**
1	**Hypercar**	**7**	**(Japan) Toyota Gazoo Racing**	**(United Kingdom) Mike Conway** **(Japan) Kamui Kobayashi** **(Netherlands) Nyck de Vries**	**Toyota H8909 3.5 L Turbo V6**	MI	**237**	**8:01:08.626‡**
2	Hypercar	8	(Japan) Toyota Gazoo Racing	(Switzerland) Sébastien Buemi (New Zealand) Brendon Hartley (Japan) Ryō Hirakawa	Toyota GR010 Hybrid	MI	237	+19.378
2	Hypercar	8	(Japan) Toyota Gazoo Racing	(Switzerland) Sébastien Buemi (New Zealand) Brendon Hartley (Japan) Ryō Hirakawa	Toyota H8909 3.5 L Turbo V6	MI	237	+19.378
3	Hypercar	50	(Italy) Ferrari AF Corse	(Italy) Antonio Fuoco (Spain) Miguel Molina (Denmark) Nicklas Nielsen	Ferrari 499P	MI	237	+26.342
3	Hypercar	50	(Italy) Ferrari AF Corse	(Italy) Antonio Fuoco (Spain) Miguel Molina (Denmark) Nicklas Nielsen	Ferrari F163 3.0 L Turbo V6	MI	237	+26.342
4	Hypercar	51	(Italy) Ferrari AF Corse	(United Kingdom) James Calado (Italy) Antonio Giovinazzi (Italy) Alessandro Pier Guidi	Ferrari 499P	MI	237	+26.504
4	Hypercar	51	(Italy) Ferrari AF Corse	(United Kingdom) James Calado (Italy) Antonio Giovinazzi (Italy) Alessandro Pier Guidi	Ferrari F163 3.0 L Turbo V6	MI	237	+26.504
5	Hypercar	83	(Italy) AF Corse	(United Kingdom) Phil Hanson (Poland) Robert Kubica (China) Yifei Ye	Ferrari 499P	MI	237	+39.729
5	Hypercar	83	(Italy) AF Corse	(United Kingdom) Phil Hanson (Poland) Robert Kubica (China) Yifei Ye	Ferrari F163 3.0 L Turbo V6	MI	237	+39.729
6	Hypercar	12	(United States) Cadillac Hertz Team Jota	(United Kingdom) Alex Lynn (France) Norman Nato (United Kingdom) Will Stevens	Cadillac V-Series.R	MI	237	+40.527
6	Hypercar	12	(United States) Cadillac Hertz Team Jota	(United Kingdom) Alex Lynn (France) Norman Nato (United Kingdom) Will Stevens	Cadillac LMC55R 5.5 L V8	MI	237	+40.527
7	Hypercar	009	(United States) Aston Martin THOR Team	(Canada) Roman De Angelis (Spain) Alex Riberas (Denmark) Marco Sørensen	Aston Martin Valkyrie	MI	237	+1:03.701
7	Hypercar	009	(United States) Aston Martin THOR Team	(Canada) Roman De Angelis (Spain) Alex Riberas (Denmark) Marco Sørensen	Aston Martin RA 6.5 L V12	MI	237	+1:03.701
8	Hypercar	20	(Germany) BMW M Team WRT	(Netherlands) Robin Frijns (Germany) René Rast (South Africa) Sheldon van der Linde	BMW M Hybrid V8	MI	236	+1 Lap
8	Hypercar	20	(Germany) BMW M Team WRT	(Netherlands) Robin Frijns (Germany) René Rast (South Africa) Sheldon van der Linde	BMW P66/3 4.0 L Turbo V8	MI	236	+1 Lap
9	Hypercar	93	(France) Peugeot TotalEnergies	(Denmark) Mikkel Jensen (United Kingdom) Paul di Resta (France) Jean-Éric Vergne	Peugeot 9X8	MI	236	+1 Lap
9	Hypercar	93	(France) Peugeot TotalEnergies	(Denmark) Mikkel Jensen (United Kingdom) Paul di Resta (France) Jean-Éric Vergne	Peugeot X6H 2.6 L Turbo V6	MI	236	+1 Lap
10	Hypercar	94	(France) Peugeot TotalEnergies	(France) Loïc Duval (Denmark) Malthe Jakobsen (France) Théo Pourchaire	Peugeot 9X8	MI	236	+1 Lap
10	Hypercar	94	(France) Peugeot TotalEnergies	(France) Loïc Duval (Denmark) Malthe Jakobsen (France) Théo Pourchaire	Peugeot X6H 2.6 L Turbo V6	MI	236	+1 Lap
11	Hypercar	35	(France) Alpine Endurance Team	(France) Paul-Loup Chatin (Austria) Ferdinand Habsburg (France) Charles Milesi	Alpine A424	MI	236	+1 Lap
11	Hypercar	35	(France) Alpine Endurance Team	(France) Paul-Loup Chatin (Austria) Ferdinand Habsburg (France) Charles Milesi	Alpine V634 3.4 L Turbo V6	MI	236	+1 Lap
12	Hypercar	36	(France) Alpine Endurance Team	(France) Jules Gounon (France) Frédéric Makowiecki (Germany) Mick Schumacher	Alpine A424	MI	236	+1 Lap
12	Hypercar	36	(France) Alpine Endurance Team	(France) Jules Gounon (France) Frédéric Makowiecki (Germany) Mick Schumacher	Alpine V634 3.4 L Turbo V6	MI	236	+1 Lap
13	Hypercar	6	(Germany) Porsche Penske Motorsport	(Australia) Matt Campbell (France) Kévin Estre (Belgium) Laurens Vanthoor	Porsche 963	MI	236	+1 Lap
13	Hypercar	6	(Germany) Porsche Penske Motorsport	(Australia) Matt Campbell (France) Kévin Estre (Belgium) Laurens Vanthoor	Porsche 9RD 4.6 L Turbo V8	MI	236	+1 Lap
14	Hypercar	5	(Germany) Porsche Penske Motorsport	(France) Julien Andlauer (Germany) Laurin Heinrich (France) Mathieu Jaminet	Porsche 963	MI	236	+1 Lap
14	Hypercar	5	(Germany) Porsche Penske Motorsport	(France) Julien Andlauer (Germany) Laurin Heinrich (France) Mathieu Jaminet	Porsche 9RD 4.6 L Turbo V8	MI	236	+1 Lap
15	Hypercar	007	(United States) Aston Martin THOR Team	(United Kingdom) Tom Gamble (United Kingdom) Ross Gunn (United Kingdom) Harry Tincknell	Aston Martin Valkyrie	MI	236	+1 Lap
15	Hypercar	007	(United States) Aston Martin THOR Team	(United Kingdom) Tom Gamble (United Kingdom) Ross Gunn (United Kingdom) Harry Tincknell	Aston Martin RA 6.5 L V12	MI	236	+1 Lap
16	Hypercar	38	(United States) Cadillac Hertz Team Jota	(New Zealand) Earl Bamber (France) Sébastien Bourdais (United Kingdom) Jenson Button	Cadillac V-Series.R	MI	235	+2 Laps
16	Hypercar	38	(United States) Cadillac Hertz Team Jota	(New Zealand) Earl Bamber (France) Sébastien Bourdais (United Kingdom) Jenson Button	Cadillac LMC55R 5.5 L V8	MI	235	+2 Laps
17	Hypercar	99	(Germany) Proton Competition	(Switzerland) Neel Jani (Chile) Nico Pino (Argentina) Nicolás Varrone	Porsche 963	MI	235	+2 Laps
17	Hypercar	99	(Germany) Proton Competition	(Switzerland) Neel Jani (Chile) Nico Pino (Argentina) Nicolás Varrone	Porsche 9RD 4.6 L Turbo V8	MI	235	+2 Laps
18	**LMGT3**	**87**	**(France) Akkodis ASP Team**	**(Argentina) José María López** **(Austria) Clemens Schmid** **(Romania) Răzvan Umbrărescu**	**Lexus RC F GT3**	G	**216**	**+21 Laps‡**
18	**LMGT3**	**87**	**(France) Akkodis ASP Team**	**(Argentina) José María López** **(Austria) Clemens Schmid** **(Romania) Răzvan Umbrărescu**	**Lexus 2UR-GSE 5.4 L V8**	G	**216**	**+21 Laps‡**
19	LMGT3	61	(Italy) Iron Lynx	(Australia) Martin Berry (Netherlands) Lin Hodenius (Belgium) Maxime Martin	Mercedes-AMG GT3 Evo	G	216	+21 Laps
19	LMGT3	61	(Italy) Iron Lynx	(Australia) Martin Berry (Netherlands) Lin Hodenius (Belgium) Maxime Martin	Mercedes-AMG M159 6.2 L V8	G	216	+21 Laps
20	LMGT3	27	(United States) Heart of Racing Team	(Italy) Mattia Drudi (United Kingdom) Ian James (Canada) Zacharie Robichon	Aston Martin Vantage AMR GT3 Evo	G	216	+21 Laps
20	LMGT3	27	(United States) Heart of Racing Team	(Italy) Mattia Drudi (United Kingdom) Ian James (Canada) Zacharie Robichon	Aston Martin M177 4.0 L Turbo V8	G	216	+21 Laps
21	LMGT3	92	(Germany) Manthey 1st Phorm	(United States) Ryan Hardwick (Austria) Richard Lietz (Italy) Riccardo Pera	Porsche 911 GT3 R (992)	G	216	+21 Laps
21	LMGT3	92	(Germany) Manthey 1st Phorm	(United States) Ryan Hardwick (Austria) Richard Lietz (Italy) Riccardo Pera	Porsche M97/80 4.2 L Flat-6	G	216	+21 Laps
22	LMGT3	21	(Italy) Vista AF Corse	(France) François Heriau (United States) Simon Mann (Italy) Alessio Rovera	Ferrari 296 GT3	G	216	+21 Laps
22	LMGT3	21	(Italy) Vista AF Corse	(France) François Heriau (United States) Simon Mann (Italy) Alessio Rovera	Ferrari F163CE 3.0 L Turbo V6	G	216	+21 Laps
23	LMGT3	33	(United Kingdom) TF Sport	(United Kingdom) Jonny Edgar (Spain) Daniel Juncadella (United States) Ben Keating	Chevrolet Corvette Z06 GT3.R	G	216	+21 Laps
23	LMGT3	33	(United Kingdom) TF Sport	(United Kingdom) Jonny Edgar (Spain) Daniel Juncadella (United States) Ben Keating	Chevrolet LT6.R 5.5 L V8	G	216	+21 Laps
24	LMGT3	31	(Belgium) The Bend Team WRT	Timur Boguslavskiy (Brazil) Augusto Farfus (Australia) Yasser Shahin	BMW M4 GT3	G	216	+21 Laps
24	LMGT3	31	(Belgium) The Bend Team WRT	Timur Boguslavskiy (Brazil) Augusto Farfus (Australia) Yasser Shahin	BMW P58 3.0 L Turbo I6	G	216	+21 Laps
25	LMGT3	77	(Germany) Proton Competition	(United Kingdom) Ben Barker (Portugal) Bernardo Sousa (United Kingdom) Ben Tuck	Ford Mustang GT3	G	216	+21 Laps
25	LMGT3	77	(Germany) Proton Competition	(United Kingdom) Ben Barker (Portugal) Bernardo Sousa (United Kingdom) Ben Tuck	Ford Coyote 5.4 L V8	G	216	+21 Laps
26	LMGT3	95	(United Kingdom) United Autosports	(Indonesia) Sean Gelael (United Kingdom) Darren Leung (Japan) Marino Sato	McLaren 720S GT3 Evo	G	216	+21 Laps
26	LMGT3	95	(United Kingdom) United Autosports	(Indonesia) Sean Gelael (United Kingdom) Darren Leung (Japan) Marino Sato	McLaren M840T 4.0 L Turbo V8	G	216	+21 Laps
27	LMGT3	88	(Germany) Proton Competition	(Italy) Stefano Gattuso (Italy) Giammarco Levorato (Norway) Dennis Olsen	Ford Mustang GT3	G	215	+22 Laps
27	LMGT3	88	(Germany) Proton Competition	(Italy) Stefano Gattuso (Italy) Giammarco Levorato (Norway) Dennis Olsen	Ford Coyote 5.4 L V8	G	215	+22 Laps
28	LMGT3	81	(United Kingdom) TF Sport	(Angola) Rui Andrade (Republic of Ireland) Charlie Eastwood (Belgium) Tom van Rompuy	Chevrolet Corvette Z06 GT3.R	G	215	+22 Laps
28	LMGT3	81	(United Kingdom) TF Sport	(Angola) Rui Andrade (Republic of Ireland) Charlie Eastwood (Belgium) Tom van Rompuy	Chevrolet LT6.R 5.5 L V8	G	215	+22 Laps
29	LMGT3	85	(Italy) Iron Dames	(Switzerland) Rahel Frey (Denmark) Michelle Gatting (France) Célia Martin	Porsche 911 GT3 R (992)	G	215	+22 Laps
29	LMGT3	85	(Italy) Iron Dames	(Switzerland) Rahel Frey (Denmark) Michelle Gatting (France) Célia Martin	Porsche M97/80 4.2 L Flat-6	G	215	+22 Laps
30	LMGT3	60	(Italy) Iron Lynx	(United Kingdom) Andrew Gilbert (United Kingdom) Lorcan Hanafin (Spain) Fran Rueda	Mercedes-AMG GT3 Evo	G	215	+22 Laps
30	LMGT3	60	(Italy) Iron Lynx	(United Kingdom) Andrew Gilbert (United Kingdom) Lorcan Hanafin (Spain) Fran Rueda	Mercedes-AMG M159 6.2 L V8	G	215	+22 Laps
31	LMGT3	10	(France) Racing Spirit of Léman	(Brazil) Eduardo Barrichello (France) Valentin Hasse-Clot (United States) Anthony McIntosh	Aston Martin Vantage AMR GT3 Evo	G	215	+22 Laps
31	LMGT3	10	(France) Racing Spirit of Léman	(Brazil) Eduardo Barrichello (France) Valentin Hasse-Clot (United States) Anthony McIntosh	Aston Martin M177 4.0 L Turbo V8	G	215	+22 Laps
32	LMGT3	46	(Belgium) Team WRT	(Oman) Ahmad Al Harthy (Italy) Valentino Rossi (South Africa) Kelvin van der Linde	BMW M4 GT3	G	215	+22 Laps
32	LMGT3	46	(Belgium) Team WRT	(Oman) Ahmad Al Harthy (Italy) Valentino Rossi (South Africa) Kelvin van der Linde	BMW P58 3.0 L Turbo I6	G	215	+22 Laps
33	LMGT3	59	(United Kingdom) United Autosports	(France) Sébastien Baud (United Kingdom) James Cottingham (Switzerland) Grégoire Saucy	McLaren 720S GT3 Evo	G	193	+44 Laps
33	LMGT3	59	(United Kingdom) United Autosports	(France) Sébastien Baud (United Kingdom) James Cottingham (Switzerland) Grégoire Saucy	McLaren M840T 4.0 L Turbo V8	G	193	+44 Laps
Ret	Hypercar	15	(Germany) BMW M Team WRT	(Denmark) Kevin Magnussen (Switzerland) Raffaele Marciello (Belgium) Dries Vanthoor	BMW M Hybrid V8	MI	211	Wheel nut
Ret	Hypercar	15	(Germany) BMW M Team WRT	(Denmark) Kevin Magnussen (Switzerland) Raffaele Marciello (Belgium) Dries Vanthoor	BMW P66/3 4.0 L Turbo V8	MI	211	Wheel nut
Ret	LMGT3	54	(Italy) Vista AF Corse	(Italy) Francesco Castellacci (Switzerland) Thomas Flohr (Italy) Davide Rigon	Ferrari 296 GT3	G	90	Accident
Ret	LMGT3	54	(Italy) Vista AF Corse	(Italy) Francesco Castellacci (Switzerland) Thomas Flohr (Italy) Davide Rigon	Ferrari F163CE 3.0 L Turbo V6	G	90	Accident
Ret	LMGT3	78	(France) Akkodis ASP Team	(United Kingdom) Ben Barnicoat (Germany) Finn Gehrsitz (France) Arnold Robin	Lexus RC F GT3	G	50	Electronics
Ret	LMGT3	78	(France) Akkodis ASP Team	(United Kingdom) Ben Barnicoat (Germany) Finn Gehrsitz (France) Arnold Robin	Lexus 2UR-GSE 5.4 L V8	G	50	Electronics

FIA World Endurance Championship
Previous race: 6 Hours of Fuji	2025 season	Next race: None
