= 2025 6 Hours of São Paulo =

Sports car endurance race

(Brazil) 2025 Rolex 6 Hours of São Paulo
Event information
- Round 5 of 8 in the 2025 FIA World Endurance Championship
- Date: 13 July 2025
- Location: São Paulo
- Venue: Autódromo José Carlos Pace
- Duration: 6 hours

Results
- Laps completed: 242
- Distance (km): 1,042.778
- Distance (miles): 647.834
- Hypercar

Pole position
- Time: 1:22.570
- Team: (United States) Cadillac Hertz Team Jota
- Drivers: (United Kingdom) Alex Lynn

Winners
- Team: (United States) Cadillac Hertz Team Jota
- Drivers: (United Kingdom) Alex Lynn (France) Norman Nato (United Kingdom) Will Stevens
- LMGT3

Winners
- Team: (France) Akkodis ASP Team
- Drivers: (Argentina) José María López (Austria) Clemens Schmid (Romania) Răzvan Umbrărescu

The 2025 6 Hours of São Paulo (formally known as the 2025 Rolex 6 Hours of São Paulo) was an endurance sportscar racing event, held between 11 and 13 July 2025 at Autódromo José Carlos Pace in São Paulo, Brazil. It was the fifth of eight rounds of the 2025 FIA World Endurance Championship and the fifth running of the event.

== Entry list ==
The provisional entry list was published on 9 July 2025 and consists of 36 entries across 2 categories – 18 in both Hypercar and LMGT3. In the Hypercar category, Sébastien Buemi, Robin Frijns, Jean-Eric Vergne and Stoffel Vandoorne are all absent due to driving duties at the Berlin ePrix. Marco Wittmann replaced the aforementioned Robin Frijns in the No. 20 Team WRT BMW. In the LMGT3 category, Pedro Ebrahim is set to replace Timur Boguslavskiy in the No. 31 Team WRT BMW as Boguslavskiy has fallen ill. Anthony McIntosh will replace Derek DeBoer in the No. 10 Racing Spirit of Léman Aston Martin and Yuichi Nakayama will fill in for Ben Barnicoat in the No. 78 Akkodis ASP Team Lexus, who is racing at IMSA's round at Canadian Tire Motorsport Park.

== Schedule ==
Date	Time (local: BRT)	Event
Friday, 11 July	11:00	Free Practice 1
Friday, 11 July	15:45	Free Practice 2
Saturday, 12 July	10:10	Free Practice 3
Saturday, 12 July	14:45	Qualifying – LMGT3
Saturday, 12 July	15:05	Hyperpole – LMGT3
Saturday, 12 July	15:25	Qualifying – Hypercar
Saturday, 12 July	15:45	Hyperpole – Hypercar
Sunday, 13 July	11:30	Race

== Practice ==
Three practice sessions are scheduled to be held before the event: two on Friday and one on Saturday. The first two sessions on Thursday ran for 90 minutes, and the final session on Saturday ran for 60 minutes.

=== Practice 1 ===
Class	No.	Entrant	Driver	Time
Hypercar	6	(Germany) Porsche Penske Motorsport	(Belgium) Laurens Vanthoor	1:25.176
LMGT3	87	(France) Akkodis ASP Team	(Argentina) José María López	1:35.010

- Note: Only the fastest car in each class is shown.

=== Practice 2 ===
Class	No.	Entrant	Driver	Time
Hypercar	6	(Germany) Porsche Penske Motorsport	(France) Kévin Estre	1:23.508
LMGT3	10	(France) Racing Spirit of Léman	(Brazil) Eduardo Barrichello	1:34.493

- Note: Only the fastest car in each class is shown.

=== Practice 3 ===
Class	No.	Entrant	Driver	Time
Hypercar	8	(Japan) Toyota Gazoo Racing	(Japan) Ryō Hirakawa	1:23.695
LMGT3	33	(United Kingdom) TF Sport	(United Kingdom) Jonny Edgar	1:34.414

- Note: Only the fastest car in each class is shown.

== Qualifying ==
=== Qualifying results ===
Pole position winners in each class are marked in bold.

Pos	Class	No.	Entrant	Qualifying	Hyperpole	Grid
1	**Hypercar**	**12**	**(United States) Cadillac Hertz Team Jota**	**1:22.829**	**1:22.570**	1
2	Hypercar	38	(United States) Cadillac Hertz Team Jota	1:23.537	1:22.670	3 (Note: The No. 38 Cadillac Hertz Team Jota entry received a 1-place grid drop after impeding the No. 93 Peugeot TotalEnergies entry in the qualifying session.)
3	Hypercar	5	(Germany) Porsche Penske Motorsport	1:23.279	1:22.834	2
4	Hypercar	94	(France) Peugeot TotalEnergies	1:23.208	1:22.948	4
5	Hypercar	20	(Germany) BMW M Team WRT	1:23.391	1:23.062	5
6	Hypercar	93	(France) Peugeot TotalEnergies	1:23.269	1:23.101	6
7	Hypercar	6	(Germany) Porsche Penske Motorsport	1:23.533	1:23.159	7
8	Hypercar	15	(Germany) BMW M Team WRT	1:23.391	1:23.259	8
9	Hypercar	83	(Italy) AF Corse	1:23.595	1:23.386	9
10	Hypercar	8	(Japan) Toyota Gazoo Racing	1:23.673	1:23.496	10
11	Hypercar	009	(United Kingdom) Aston Martin THOR Team	1:23.710		11
12	Hypercar	99	(Germany) Proton Competition	1:23.740		13 (Note: The No. 99 Proton Competition entry received a 1-place grid drop after impeding the No. 50 Ferrari AF Corse entry in the qualifying session.)
13	Hypercar	007	(United Kingdom) Aston Martin THOR Team	1:23.751		12
14	Hypercar	50	(Italy) Ferrari AF Corse	1:23.759		14
15	Hypercar	36	(France) Alpine Endurance Team	1:23.770		15
16	Hypercar	35	(France) Alpine Endurance Team	1:23.816		16
17	Hypercar	51	(Italy) Ferrari AF Corse	1:23.831		17
18	Hypercar	7	(Japan) Toyota Gazoo Racing	1:24.153		18
19	**LMGT3**	**10**	**(France) Racing Spirit of Léman**	**1:35.340**	**1:33.849**	19
20	LMGT3	87	(France) Akkodis ASP Team	1:34.488	1:33.873	20
21	LMGT3	78	(France) Akkodis ASP Team	1:35.193	1:33.963	21
22	LMGT3	61	(Italy) Iron Lynx	1:35.156	1:34.051	22
23	LMGT3	95	(United Kingdom) United Autosports	1:35.090	1:34.219	23
24	LMGT3	59	(United Kingdom) United Autosports	1:34.891	1:34.418	24
25	LMGT3	85	(Italy) Iron Dames	1:35.327	1:34.433	25
26	LMGT3	88	(Germany) Proton Competition	1:35.032	1:34.448	26
27	LMGT3	33	(United Kingdom) TF Sport	1:35.287	1:34.507	27
28	LMGT3	81	(United Kingdom) TF Sport	1:35.263	1:34.952	28
29	LMGT3	54	(Italy) Vista AF Corse	1:35.366		29
30	LMGT3	27	(United States) Heart of Racing Team	1:35.481		30
31	LMGT3	92	(Germany) Manthey 1st Phorm	1:35.504		31
32	LMGT3	46	(Belgium) Team WRT	1:35.536		32
33	LMGT3	21	(Italy) Vista AF Corse	1:35.542		33
34	LMGT3	77	(Germany) Proton Competition	1:35.554		34
35	LMGT3	31	(Belgium) The Bend Team WRT	1:36.684		35
36	LMGT3	60	(Italy) Iron Lynx	No time		36

== Race ==
The race started at 11:30 BRST on Sunday, and ran for six hours.

=== Race results ===
The minimum number of laps for classification (70% of overall winning car's distance) was 169 laps. Class winners are in bold and ‡.

Pos	Class	No	Team	Drivers	Chassis	Tyre	Laps	Time/Retired
Pos	Class	No	Team	Drivers	Engine	Tyre	Laps	Time/Retired
1	**Hypercar**	**12**	**(United States) Cadillac Hertz Team Jota**	**(United Kingdom) Alex Lynn** **(France) Norman Nato** **(United Kingdom) Will Stevens**	**Cadillac V-Series.R**	MI	**242**	**6:00:19.732‡**
1	**Hypercar**	**12**	**(United States) Cadillac Hertz Team Jota**	**(United Kingdom) Alex Lynn** **(France) Norman Nato** **(United Kingdom) Will Stevens**	**Cadillac LMC55R 5.5 L V8**	MI	**242**	**6:00:19.732‡**
2	Hypercar	38	(United States) Cadillac Hertz Team Jota	(New Zealand) Earl Bamber (France) Sébastien Bourdais (United Kingdom) Jenson Button	Cadillac V-Series.R	MI	242	+57.016
2	Hypercar	38	(United States) Cadillac Hertz Team Jota	(New Zealand) Earl Bamber (France) Sébastien Bourdais (United Kingdom) Jenson Button	Cadillac LMC55R 5.5 L V8	MI	242	+57.016
3	Hypercar	5	(Germany) Porsche Penske Motorsport	(France) Julien Andlauer (Denmark) Michael Christensen	Porsche 963	MI	242	+58.882
3	Hypercar	5	(Germany) Porsche Penske Motorsport	(France) Julien Andlauer (Denmark) Michael Christensen	Porsche 9RD 4.6 L Turbo V8	MI	242	+58.882
4	Hypercar	6	(Germany) Porsche Penske Motorsport	(France) Kévin Estre (Belgium) Laurens Vanthoor	Porsche 963	MI	241	+1 Lap
4	Hypercar	6	(Germany) Porsche Penske Motorsport	(France) Kévin Estre (Belgium) Laurens Vanthoor	Porsche 9RD 4.6 L Turbo V8	MI	241	+1 Lap
5	Hypercar	20	(Germany) BMW M Team WRT	(South Africa) Sheldon van der Linde (Germany) René Rast (Germany) Marco Wittmann	BMW M Hybrid V8	MI	241	+1 Lap
5	Hypercar	20	(Germany) BMW M Team WRT	(South Africa) Sheldon van der Linde (Germany) René Rast (Germany) Marco Wittmann	BMW P66/3 4.0 L Turbo V8	MI	241	+1 Lap
6	Hypercar	94	(France) Peugeot TotalEnergies	(France) Loïc Duval (Denmark) Malthe Jakobsen	Peugeot 9X8	MI	240	+2 Laps
6	Hypercar	94	(France) Peugeot TotalEnergies	(France) Loïc Duval (Denmark) Malthe Jakobsen	Peugeot X6H 2.6 L Turbo V6	MI	240	+2 Laps
7	Hypercar	93	(France) Peugeot TotalEnergies	(Denmark) Mikkel Jensen (United Kingdom) Paul di Resta	Peugeot 9X8	MI	240	+2 Laps
7	Hypercar	93	(France) Peugeot TotalEnergies	(Denmark) Mikkel Jensen (United Kingdom) Paul di Resta	Peugeot X6H 2.6 L Turbo V6	MI	240	+2 Laps
8	Hypercar	83	(Italy) AF Corse	(United Kingdom) Phil Hanson (Poland) Robert Kubica (China) Yifei Ye	Ferrari 499P	MI	240	+2 Laps
8	Hypercar	83	(Italy) AF Corse	(United Kingdom) Phil Hanson (Poland) Robert Kubica (China) Yifei Ye	Ferrari F163 3.0 L Turbo V6	MI	240	+2 Laps
9	Hypercar	36	(France) Alpine Endurance Team	(France) Jules Gounon (France) Frédéric Makowiecki (Germany) Mick Schumacher	Alpine A424	MI	240	+2 Laps
9	Hypercar	36	(France) Alpine Endurance Team	(France) Jules Gounon (France) Frédéric Makowiecki (Germany) Mick Schumacher	Alpine V634 3.4 L Turbo V6	MI	240	+2 Laps
10	Hypercar	99	(Germany) Proton Competition	(Switzerland) Neel Jani (Chile) Nico Pino (Argentina) Nicolás Varrone	Porsche 963	MI	240	+2 Laps
10	Hypercar	99	(Germany) Proton Competition	(Switzerland) Neel Jani (Chile) Nico Pino (Argentina) Nicolás Varrone	Porsche 9RD 4.6 L Turbo V8	MI	240	+2 Laps
11	Hypercar	51	(Italy) Ferrari AF Corse	(United Kingdom) James Calado (Italy) Antonio Giovinazzi (Italy) Alessandro Pier Guidi	Ferrari 499P	MI	239	+3 Laps
11	Hypercar	51	(Italy) Ferrari AF Corse	(United Kingdom) James Calado (Italy) Antonio Giovinazzi (Italy) Alessandro Pier Guidi	Ferrari F163 3.0 L Turbo V6	MI	239	+3 Laps
12	Hypercar	50	(Italy) Ferrari AF Corse	(Italy) Antonio Fuoco (Spain) Miguel Molina (Denmark) Nicklas Nielsen	Ferrari 499P	MI	239	+3 Laps
12	Hypercar	50	(Italy) Ferrari AF Corse	(Italy) Antonio Fuoco (Spain) Miguel Molina (Denmark) Nicklas Nielsen	Ferrari F163 3.0 L Turbo V6	MI	239	+3 Laps
13	Hypercar	009	(United Kingdom) Aston Martin THOR Team	(Spain) Alex Riberas (Denmark) Marco Sørensen	Aston Martin Valkyrie	MI	239	+3 Laps
13	Hypercar	009	(United Kingdom) Aston Martin THOR Team	(Spain) Alex Riberas (Denmark) Marco Sørensen	Aston Martin RA 6.5 L V12	MI	239	+3 Laps
14	Hypercar	7	(Japan) Toyota Gazoo Racing	(United Kingdom) Mike Conway (Japan) Kamui Kobayashi (Netherlands) Nyck de Vries	Toyota GR010 Hybrid	MI	239	+3 Laps
14	Hypercar	7	(Japan) Toyota Gazoo Racing	(United Kingdom) Mike Conway (Japan) Kamui Kobayashi (Netherlands) Nyck de Vries	Toyota H8909 3.5 L Turbo V6	MI	239	+3 Laps
15	Hypercar	8	(Japan) Toyota Gazoo Racing	(New Zealand) Brendon Hartley (Japan) Ryō Hirakawa	Toyota GR010 Hybrid	MI	239	+3 Laps
15	Hypercar	8	(Japan) Toyota Gazoo Racing	(New Zealand) Brendon Hartley (Japan) Ryō Hirakawa	Toyota H8909 3.5 L Turbo V6	MI	239	+3 Laps
16	Hypercar	007	(United Kingdom) Aston Martin THOR Team	(United Kingdom) Tom Gamble (United Kingdom) Harry Tincknell	Aston Martin Valkyrie	MI	238	+4 Laps
16	Hypercar	007	(United Kingdom) Aston Martin THOR Team	(United Kingdom) Tom Gamble (United Kingdom) Harry Tincknell	Aston Martin RA 6.5 L V12	MI	238	+4 Laps
17	Hypercar	15	(Germany) BMW M Team WRT	(Denmark) Kevin Magnussen (Switzerland) Raffaele Marciello (Belgium) Dries Vanthoor	BMW M Hybrid V8	MI	222	+20 Laps
17	Hypercar	15	(Germany) BMW M Team WRT	(Denmark) Kevin Magnussen (Switzerland) Raffaele Marciello (Belgium) Dries Vanthoor	BMW P66/3 4.0 L Turbo V8	MI	222	+20 Laps
18	**LMGT3**	**87**	**(France) Akkodis ASP Team**	**(Argentina) José María López** **(Austria) Clemens Schmid** **(Romania) Răzvan Umbrărescu**	**Lexus RC F GT3**	G	**216**	**+26 Laps‡**
18	**LMGT3**	**87**	**(France) Akkodis ASP Team**	**(Argentina) José María López** **(Austria) Clemens Schmid** **(Romania) Răzvan Umbrărescu**	**Lexus 2UR-GSE 5.4 L V8**	G	**216**	**+26 Laps‡**
19	LMGT3	81	(United Kingdom) TF Sport	(Angola) Rui Andrade (Republic of Ireland) Charlie Eastwood (Belgium) Tom van Rompuy	Chevrolet Corvette Z06 GT3.R	G	216	+26 Laps
19	LMGT3	81	(United Kingdom) TF Sport	(Angola) Rui Andrade (Republic of Ireland) Charlie Eastwood (Belgium) Tom van Rompuy	Chevrolet LT6.R 5.5 L V8	G	216	+26 Laps
20	LMGT3	10	(France) Racing Spirit of Léman	(Brazil) Eduardo Barrichello (France) Valentin Hasse-Clot (United States) Anthony McIntosh	Aston Martin Vantage AMR GT3 Evo	G	216	+26 Laps
20	LMGT3	10	(France) Racing Spirit of Léman	(Brazil) Eduardo Barrichello (France) Valentin Hasse-Clot (United States) Anthony McIntosh	Aston Martin M177 4.0 L Turbo V8	G	216	+26 Laps
21	LMGT3	85	(Italy) Iron Dames	(Switzerland) Rahel Frey (Denmark) Michelle Gatting (France) Célia Martin	Porsche 911 GT3 R (992)	G	216	+26 Laps
21	LMGT3	85	(Italy) Iron Dames	(Switzerland) Rahel Frey (Denmark) Michelle Gatting (France) Célia Martin	Porsche M97/80 4.2 L Flat-6	G	216	+26 Laps
22	LMGT3	78	(France) Akkodis ASP Team	(Germany) Finn Gehrsitz (Japan) Yuichi Nakayama (France) Arnold Robin	Lexus RC F GT3	G	216	+26 Laps
22	LMGT3	78	(France) Akkodis ASP Team	(Germany) Finn Gehrsitz (Japan) Yuichi Nakayama (France) Arnold Robin	Lexus 2UR-GSE 5.4 L V8	G	216	+26 Laps
23	LMGT3	92	(Germany) Manthey 1st Phorm	(United States) Ryan Hardwick (Austria) Richard Lietz (Italy) Riccardo Pera	Porsche 911 GT3 R (992)	G	215	+27 Laps
23	LMGT3	92	(Germany) Manthey 1st Phorm	(United States) Ryan Hardwick (Austria) Richard Lietz (Italy) Riccardo Pera	Porsche M97/80 4.2 L Flat-6	G	215	+27 Laps
24	LMGT3	33	(United Kingdom) TF Sport	(United Kingdom) Jonny Edgar (Spain) Daniel Juncadella (United States) Ben Keating	Chevrolet Corvette Z06 GT3.R	G	215	+27 Laps
24	LMGT3	33	(United Kingdom) TF Sport	(United Kingdom) Jonny Edgar (Spain) Daniel Juncadella (United States) Ben Keating	Chevrolet LT6.R 5.5 L V8	G	215	+27 Laps
25	LMGT3	59	(United Kingdom) United Autosports	(France) Sébastien Baud (United Kingdom) James Cottingham (Switzerland) Grégoire Saucy	McLaren 720S GT3 Evo	G	215	+27 Laps
25	LMGT3	59	(United Kingdom) United Autosports	(France) Sébastien Baud (United Kingdom) James Cottingham (Switzerland) Grégoire Saucy	McLaren M840T 4.0 L Turbo V8	G	215	+27 Laps
26	LMGT3	95	(United Kingdom) United Autosports	(Indonesia) Sean Gelael (United Kingdom) Darren Leung (Japan) Marino Sato	McLaren 720S GT3 Evo	G	215	+27 Laps
26	LMGT3	95	(United Kingdom) United Autosports	(Indonesia) Sean Gelael (United Kingdom) Darren Leung (Japan) Marino Sato	McLaren M840T 4.0 L Turbo V8	G	215	+27 Laps
27	LMGT3	46	(Belgium) Team WRT	(Oman) Ahmad Al Harthy (Italy) Valentino Rossi (South Africa) Kelvin van der Linde	BMW M4 GT3	G	215	+27 Laps
27	LMGT3	46	(Belgium) Team WRT	(Oman) Ahmad Al Harthy (Italy) Valentino Rossi (South Africa) Kelvin van der Linde	BMW P58 3.0 L Turbo I6	G	215	+27 Laps
28	LMGT3	54	(Italy) Vista AF Corse	(Italy) Francesco Castellacci (Switzerland) Thomas Flohr (Italy) Davide Rigon	Ferrari 296 GT3	G	215	+27 Laps
28	LMGT3	54	(Italy) Vista AF Corse	(Italy) Francesco Castellacci (Switzerland) Thomas Flohr (Italy) Davide Rigon	Ferrari F163CE 3.0 L Turbo V6	G	215	+27 Laps
29	LMGT3	31	(Belgium) The Bend Team WRT	(Brazil) Pedro Ebrahim (Brazil) Augusto Farfus (Australia) Yasser Shahin	BMW M4 GT3	G	215	+27 Laps
29	LMGT3	31	(Belgium) The Bend Team WRT	(Brazil) Pedro Ebrahim (Brazil) Augusto Farfus (Australia) Yasser Shahin	BMW P58 3.0 L Turbo I6	G	215	+27 Laps
30	LMGT3	21	(Italy) Vista AF Corse	(France) François Heriau (United States) Simon Mann (Italy) Alessio Rovera	Ferrari 296 GT3	G	215	+27 Laps
30	LMGT3	21	(Italy) Vista AF Corse	(France) François Heriau (United States) Simon Mann (Italy) Alessio Rovera	Ferrari F163CE 3.0 L Turbo V6	G	215	+27 Laps
31	LMGT3	27	(United States) Heart of Racing Team	(Italy) Mattia Drudi (United Kingdom) Ian James (Canada) Zacharie Robichon	Aston Martin Vantage AMR GT3 Evo	G	214	+28 Laps
31	LMGT3	27	(United States) Heart of Racing Team	(Italy) Mattia Drudi (United Kingdom) Ian James (Canada) Zacharie Robichon	Aston Martin M177 4.0 L Turbo V8	G	214	+28 Laps
32	LMGT3	60	(Italy) Iron Lynx	(United Kingdom) Andrew Gilbert (United Kingdom) Lorcan Hanafin (Spain) Fran Rueda	Mercedes-AMG GT3 Evo	G	214	+28 Laps
32	LMGT3	60	(Italy) Iron Lynx	(United Kingdom) Andrew Gilbert (United Kingdom) Lorcan Hanafin (Spain) Fran Rueda	Mercedes-AMG M159 6.2 L V8	G	214	+28 Laps
33	Hypercar	35	(France) Alpine Endurance Team	(France) Paul-Loup Chatin (Austria) Ferdinand Habsburg (France) Charles Milesi	Alpine A424	MI	200	+42 Laps
33	Hypercar	35	(France) Alpine Endurance Team	(France) Paul-Loup Chatin (Austria) Ferdinand Habsburg (France) Charles Milesi	Alpine V634 3.4 L Turbo V6	MI	200	+42 Laps
Ret	LMGT3	61	(Italy) Iron Lynx	(Australia) Martin Berry (Netherlands) Lin Hodenius (Belgium) Maxime Martin	Mercedes-AMG GT3 Evo	G	184	Brakes
Ret	LMGT3	61	(Italy) Iron Lynx	(Australia) Martin Berry (Netherlands) Lin Hodenius (Belgium) Maxime Martin	Mercedes-AMG M159 6.2 L V8	G	184	Brakes
Ret	LMGT3	77	(Germany) Proton Competition	(United Kingdom) Ben Barker (Portugal) Bernardo Sousa (United Kingdom) Ben Tuck	Ford Mustang GT3	G	169	Exhaust
Ret	LMGT3	77	(Germany) Proton Competition	(United Kingdom) Ben Barker (Portugal) Bernardo Sousa (United Kingdom) Ben Tuck	Ford Coyote 5.4 L V8	G	169	Exhaust
Ret	LMGT3	88	(Germany) Proton Competition	(Italy) Stefano Gattuso (Italy) Giammarco Levorato (Norway) Dennis Olsen	Ford Mustang GT3	G	86	Damper
Ret	LMGT3	88	(Germany) Proton Competition	(Italy) Stefano Gattuso (Italy) Giammarco Levorato (Norway) Dennis Olsen	Ford Coyote 5.4 L V8	G	86	Damper

FIA World Endurance Championship
Previous race: 24 Hours of Le Mans	2025 season	Next race: Lone Star Le Mans
