= 2024 6 Hours of São Paulo =

Sports car endurance race

Coordinates: 23°42′13″S 46°41′59″W

(Brazil) 2024 Rolex 6 Hours of São Paulo
Event information
- Round 5 of 8 in the 2024 FIA World Endurance Championship
- Date: 14 July 2024
- Location: São Paulo
- Venue: Autódromo José Carlos Pace
- Duration: 6 Hours

Results
- Laps completed: 236
- Distance (km): 1016.924
- Distance (miles): 631.772
- Hypercar

Pole position
- Time: 1:23.140
- Team: (Japan) Toyota Gazoo Racing
- Drivers: (Japan) Kamui Kobayashi

Winners
- Team: (Japan) Toyota Gazoo Racing
- Drivers: (Switzerland) Sébastien Buemi (New Zealand) Brendon Hartley (Japan) Ryo Hirakawa
- LMGT3

Winners
- Team: (Lithuania) Manthey PureRxcing
- Drivers: (Austria) Klaus Bachler (Saint Kitts and Nevis) Alex Malykhin (Germany) Joel Sturm

The 2024 6 Hours of São Paulo (formally known as the 2024 Rolex 6 Hours of São Paulo) was an endurance sportscar racing event held on 14 July 2024, as the fifth of eight rounds of the 2024 FIA World Endurance Championship. It was the fourth running of the event as part of the World Endurance Championship, and the first running of the event since 2014.

== Background ==
The event was announced on 9 June 2023, during the 2023 24 Hours of Le Mans weekend. Interlagos Circuit signed a contract to host the event until at least 2028, made possible via an agreement with the São Paulo City Hall.

== Entry list ==
The entry list was revealed on 26 June 2024, with 37 entries: 19 in Hypercar and 18 in LMGT3. Clemens Schmid was set to replace Timur Boguslavskiy in the No. 78 Akkodis ASP Team Lexus. However, the car had to withdraw from the event after a heavy crash from Arnold Robin in the first free practice session. Furthermore, Harry Tincknell was not aboard the No. 99 Proton Competition Porsche due to commitments in IMSA's Mosport Park round. Mike Conway returned behind the wheel of the No. 7 Toyota Gazoo Racing Toyota, after withdrawing from Le Mans after an accident. José María López, therefore, returned behind the wheel of the No. 87 Akkodis ASP Team Lexus.

== Schedule ==
Date	Time (local: BRT)	Event
Friday, 12 July	10:45	Free Practice 1
Friday, 12 July	14:30	Free Practice 2
Saturday, 13 July	10:30	Free Practice 3
Saturday, 13 July	14:30	Qualifying - LMGT3
Saturday, 13 July	14:50	Hyperpole - LMGT3
Saturday, 13 July	15:10	Qualifying - Hypercar
Saturday, 13 July	15:30	Hyperpole - Hypercar
Sunday, 14 July	11:30	Race

== Practice ==
Three practice sessions were held: two on Friday, and one on Saturday. The sessions on Friday morning and Friday afternoon lasted 90 minutes, and the session on Saturday morning lasted 60 minutes.

=== Practice 1 ===
The first practice session started at 10:45 BRT on Friday. Nico Müller topped the session in the No. 93 Peugeot TotalEnergies entry, with a lap time of 1:26.341. He was 0.179 seconds quicker than second-placed Earl Bamber in the No. 2 Cadillac Racing entry, and André Lotterer finished third in the No. 6 Porsche Penske Motorsport. Nicolas Costa was quickest in the LMGT3 category: he lapped the circuit in 1 minute, 35.881 seconds, in the No. 59 United Autosports McLaren. He was only 0.003 seconds quicker than second-placed Alex Riberas in the No. 27 Heart of Racing Team Aston Martin, with Marco Sørensen rounding out the top three in the No. 777 D'station Racing Aston Martin. The session was red-flagged with 43 minutes to go after a heavy crash from Arnold Robin: the session would not be resumed. The No. 78 Lexus was withdrawn from the event, with the damage to the car too much to repair.

Class	No.	Entrant	Driver	Time
Hypercar	93	(France) Peugeot TotalEnergies	(Switzerland) Nico Müller	1:26.341
LMGT3	59	(United Kingdom) United Autosports	(Brazil) Nicolas Costa	1:35.881

- Note: Only the fastest car in each class is shown.

=== Practice 2 ===
The second practice session started at 14:30 BRT on Friday. Toyota set the two fastest times: Sébastien Buemi was quickest in the No. 8 Toyota with a lap of 1:25.727, 0.033 seconds quicker than second-placed Kamui Kobayashi in the sister No. 7 car. Alessandro Pier Guidi rounded out the top three in the No. 51 Ferrari AF Corse entry; he was only 0.043 seconds slower than Buemi. José María López topped the session in the LMGT3 category in the one remaining Lexus, with a lap of 1:35.725. He was 0.325 seconds quicker than Franck Perera in the No. 60 Iron Lynx Lamborghini, with Alessio Rovera in the No. 55 Vista AF Corse Ferrari third-quickest.

Class	No.	Entrant	Driver	Time
Hypercar	8	(Japan) Toyota Gazoo Racing	(Switzerland) Sébastien Buemi	1:25.727
LMGT3	87	(France) Akkodis ASP Team	(Argentina) José María López	1:35.881

- Note: Only the fastest car in each class is shown.

=== Final practice ===
The third and final practice session started at 10:30 BRT on Saturday. Callum Ilott led a Porsche 1–2–3 in the No. 12 Hertz Team Jota Porsche, with a lap time of 1:24.297. He was 0.012 seconds quicker than Matt Campbell in the No. 5 Porsche Penske Motorsport Porsche, whilst Kévin Estre in the sister No. 6 Porsche finished as third-quickest, 0.093 seconds behind Ilott. Alex Malykhin set the fastest lap in LMGT3: he lapped the circuit in 1 minute, 35.488 seconds in the No. 92 Manthey PureRxcing Porsche. He was 0.062 seconds quicker than second-placed Nico Pino in the No. 95 McLaren, and Sarah Bovy rounded out the top three in the No. 85 Iron Dames Lamborghini.

Class	No.	Entrant	Driver	Time
Hypercar	12	(United Kingdom) Hertz Team Jota	(United Kingdom) Callum Ilott	1:24.297
LMGT3	92	(Germany) Manthey PureRxcing	(Saint Kitts and Nevis) Alex Malykhin	1:35.488

- Note: Only the fastest car in each class is shown.

== Qualifying ==
Qualifying started at 14:30 BRT on Saturday. Pole position was claimed by Kamui Kobayashi in the No. 7 Toyota with a lap of 1:23.140, which was 0.122 seconds quicker than Buemi in the sister No. 8 Toyota. Campbell rounded out the top three in the No. 5 Porsche, 0.191 seconds behind Kobayashi. LMGT3 saw pole position be claimed by Bovy in the No. 85 Lamborghini, with a lap time of 1:34.413. She was 0.391 seconds quicker than second-placed Malykhin in the No. 92 Porsche, with Josh Caygill in the No. 95 McLaren third-quickest.

=== Qualifying results ===
Pole position winners in each class are marked in bold.

Pos	Class	No.	Entrant	Qualifying	Hyperpole	Grid
1	**Hypercar**	**7**	**(Japan) Toyota Gazoo Racing**	**1:23.426**	**1:23.140**	1
2	Hypercar	8	(Japan) Toyota Gazoo Racing	1:23.605	1:23.262	2
3	Hypercar	5	(Germany) Porsche Penske Motorsport	1:23.263	1:23.331	3
4	Hypercar	2	(United States) Cadillac Racing	1:23.584	1:23.396	4
5	Hypercar	6	(Germany) Porsche Penske Motorsport	1:23.739	1:23.408	5
6	Hypercar	50	(Italy) Ferrari AF Corse	1:23.583	1:23.532	6
7	Hypercar	12	(United Kingdom) Hertz Team Jota	1:23.357	1:23.639	7
8	Hypercar	38	(United Kingdom) Hertz Team Jota	1:23.634	1:23.701	8
9	Hypercar	51	(Italy) Ferrari AF Corse	1:23.581	1:23.910	9
10	Hypercar	20	(Belgium) BMW M Team WRT	1:23.629	1:24.078	10
11	Hypercar	36	(France) Alpine Endurance Team	1:23.927		11
12	Hypercar	99	(Germany) Proton Competition	1:23.955		12
13	Hypercar	35	(France) Alpine Endurance Team	1:23.962		13
14	Hypercar	15	(Belgium) BMW M Team WRT	1:24.055		14
15	Hypercar	83	(Italy) AF Corse	1:24.066		15
16	Hypercar	94	(France) Peugeot TotalEnergies	1:24.406		16
17	Hypercar	93	(France) Peugeot TotalEnergies	1:24.445		17
18	Hypercar	63	(Italy) Lamborghini Iron Lynx	1:24.554		18
19	Hypercar	11	(Italy) Isotta Fraschini	1:24.863		19
20	**LMGT3**	**85**	**(Italy) Iron Dames**	**1:35.299**	**1:34.413**	20
21	LMGT3	92	(Lithuania) Manthey PureRxcing	1:35.462	1:34.804	21
22	LMGT3	95	(United Kingdom) United Autosports	1:35.572	1:34.860	22
23	LMGT3	59	(United Kingdom) United Autosports	1:35.810	1:34.911	23
24	LMGT3	91	(Germany) Manthey EMA	1:36.015	1:35.471	24
25	LMGT3	31	(Belgium) Team WRT	1:36.026	1:35.562	25
26	LMGT3	55	(Italy) Vista AF Corse	1:35.620	1:35.656	26
27	LMGT3	81	(United Kingdom) TF Sport	1:35.744	1:35.931	27
28	LMGT3	27	(United States) Heart of Racing Team	1:35.660	1:36.211	28
29	LMGT3	54	(Italy) Vista AF Corse	1:35.877	No time (Note: The No. 54 Vista AF Corse Ferrari did not set a competitive lap time after causing a red flag in the LMGT3 Hyperpole session.)	29
30	LMGT3	77	(Germany) Proton Competition	1:36.085		30
31	LMGT3	46	(Belgium) Team WRT	1:36.163		31
32	LMGT3	82	(United Kingdom) TF Sport	1:36.169		32
33	LMGT3	777	(Japan) D'station Racing	1:36.415		33
34	LMGT3	87	(France) Akkodis ASP Team	1:36.817		34
35	LMGT3	60	(Italy) Iron Lynx	1:37.944		35
36	LMGT3	88	(Germany) Proton Competition	1:38.004		36

== Race ==
=== Race results ===
The minimum number of laps for classification (70% of overall winning car's distance) was 165 laps. Class winners are in bold and ‡.

Pos	Class	No	Team	Drivers	Chassis	Tyre	Laps	Time/Retired
Pos	Class	No	Team	Drivers	Engine	Tyre	Laps	Time/Retired
1	**Hypercar**	**8**	**(Japan) Toyota Gazoo Racing**	**(Switzerland) Sébastien Buemi (New Zealand) Brendon Hartley (Japan) Ryo Hirakawa**	**Toyota GR010 Hybrid**	MI	**236**	**6:01:02.554‡**
1	**Hypercar**	**8**	**(Japan) Toyota Gazoo Racing**	**(Switzerland) Sébastien Buemi (New Zealand) Brendon Hartley (Japan) Ryo Hirakawa**	**Toyota H8909 3.5 L Turbo V6**	MI	**236**	**6:01:02.554‡**
2	Hypercar	6	(Germany) Porsche Penske Motorsport	(France) Kévin Estre (Germany) André Lotterer (Belgium) Laurens Vanthoor	Porsche 963	MI	236	+1:08.811
2	Hypercar	6	(Germany) Porsche Penske Motorsport	(France) Kévin Estre (Germany) André Lotterer (Belgium) Laurens Vanthoor	Porsche 9RD 4.6 L Turbo V8	MI	236	+1:08.811
3	Hypercar	5	(Germany) Porsche Penske Motorsport	(Australia) Matt Campbell (Denmark) Michael Christensen (France) Frédéric Makowiecki	Porsche 963	MI	236	+1:15.993
3	Hypercar	5	(Germany) Porsche Penske Motorsport	(Australia) Matt Campbell (Denmark) Michael Christensen (France) Frédéric Makowiecki	Porsche 9RD 4.6 L Turbo V8	MI	236	+1:15.993
4	Hypercar	7	(Japan) Toyota Gazoo Racing	(United Kingdom) Mike Conway (Japan) Kamui Kobayashi (Netherlands) Nyck de Vries	Toyota GR010 Hybrid	MI	236	+1:23.571
4	Hypercar	7	(Japan) Toyota Gazoo Racing	(United Kingdom) Mike Conway (Japan) Kamui Kobayashi (Netherlands) Nyck de Vries	Toyota H8909 3.5 L Turbo V6	MI	236	+1:23.571
5	Hypercar	51	(Italy) Ferrari AF Corse	(United Kingdom) James Calado (Italy) Antonio Giovinazzi (Italy) Alessandro Pier Guidi	Ferrari 499P	MI	236	+1:27.395
5	Hypercar	51	(Italy) Ferrari AF Corse	(United Kingdom) James Calado (Italy) Antonio Giovinazzi (Italy) Alessandro Pier Guidi	Ferrari F163 3.0 L Turbo V6	MI	236	+1:27.395
6	Hypercar	50	(Italy) Ferrari AF Corse	(Italy) Antonio Fuoco (Spain) Miguel Molina (Denmark) Nicklas Nielsen	Ferrari 499P	MI	235	+1 Lap
6	Hypercar	50	(Italy) Ferrari AF Corse	(Italy) Antonio Fuoco (Spain) Miguel Molina (Denmark) Nicklas Nielsen	Ferrari F163 3.0 L Turbo V6	MI	235	+1 Lap
7	Hypercar	38	(United Kingdom) Hertz Team Jota	(United Kingdom) Jenson Button (United Kingdom) Phil Hanson (Denmark) Oliver Rasmussen	Porsche 963	MI	235	+1 Lap
7	Hypercar	38	(United Kingdom) Hertz Team Jota	(United Kingdom) Jenson Button (United Kingdom) Phil Hanson (Denmark) Oliver Rasmussen	Porsche 9RD 4.6 L Turbo V8	MI	235	+1 Lap
8	Hypercar	93	(France) Peugeot TotalEnergies	(Denmark) Mikkel Jensen (Switzerland) Nico Müller (France) Jean-Éric Vergne	Peugeot 9X8	MI	235	+1 Lap
8	Hypercar	93	(France) Peugeot TotalEnergies	(Denmark) Mikkel Jensen (Switzerland) Nico Müller (France) Jean-Éric Vergne	Peugeot X6H 2.6 L Turbo V6	MI	235	+1 Lap
9	Hypercar	15	(Belgium) BMW M Team WRT	(Switzerland) Raffaele Marciello (Belgium) Dries Vanthoor (Germany) Marco Wittmann	BMW M Hybrid V8	MI	235	+1 Lap
9	Hypercar	15	(Belgium) BMW M Team WRT	(Switzerland) Raffaele Marciello (Belgium) Dries Vanthoor (Germany) Marco Wittmann	BMW P66/3 4.0 L Turbo V8	MI	235	+1 Lap
10	Hypercar	36	(France) Alpine Endurance Team	(France) Nicolas Lapierre (Germany) Mick Schumacher (France) Matthieu Vaxivière	Alpine A424	MI	234	+2 Laps
10	Hypercar	36	(France) Alpine Endurance Team	(France) Nicolas Lapierre (Germany) Mick Schumacher (France) Matthieu Vaxivière	Alpine V634 3.4 L Turbo V6	MI	234	+2 Laps
11	Hypercar	83	(Italy) AF Corse	(Poland) Robert Kubica (Israel) Robert Shwartzman (China) Yifei Ye	Ferrari 499P	MI	234	+2 Laps
11	Hypercar	83	(Italy) AF Corse	(Poland) Robert Kubica (Israel) Robert Shwartzman (China) Yifei Ye	Ferrari F163 3.0 L Turbo V6	MI	234	+2 Laps
12	Hypercar	35	(France) Alpine Endurance Team	(France) Paul-Loup Chatin (Austria) Ferdinand Habsburg (France) Charles Milesi	Alpine A424	MI	234	+2 Laps
12	Hypercar	35	(France) Alpine Endurance Team	(France) Paul-Loup Chatin (Austria) Ferdinand Habsburg (France) Charles Milesi	Alpine V634 3.4 L Turbo V6	MI	234	+2 Laps
13	Hypercar	2	(United States) Cadillac Racing	(New Zealand) Earl Bamber (United Kingdom) Alex Lynn	Cadillac V-Series.R	MI	234	+2 Laps
13	Hypercar	2	(United States) Cadillac Racing	(New Zealand) Earl Bamber (United Kingdom) Alex Lynn	Cadillac LMC55R 5.5 L V8	MI	234	+2 Laps
14	Hypercar	20	(Belgium) BMW M Team WRT	(Netherlands) Robin Frijns (Germany) René Rast (South Africa) Sheldon van der Linde	BMW M Hybrid V8	MI	234	+2 Laps
14	Hypercar	20	(Belgium) BMW M Team WRT	(Netherlands) Robin Frijns (Germany) René Rast (South Africa) Sheldon van der Linde	BMW P66/3 4.0 L Turbo V8	MI	234	+2 Laps
15	Hypercar	99	(Germany) Proton Competition	(France) Julien Andlauer (Switzerland) Neel Jani	Porsche 963	MI	234	+2 Laps
15	Hypercar	99	(Germany) Proton Competition	(France) Julien Andlauer (Switzerland) Neel Jani	Porsche 9RD 4.6 L Turbo V8	MI	234	+2 Laps
16	Hypercar	94	(France) Peugeot TotalEnergies	(United Kingdom) Paul di Resta (France) Loïc Duval (Belgium) Stoffel Vandoorne	Peugeot 9X8	MI	234	+2 Laps
16	Hypercar	94	(France) Peugeot TotalEnergies	(United Kingdom) Paul di Resta (France) Loïc Duval (Belgium) Stoffel Vandoorne	Peugeot X6H 2.6 L Turbo V6	MI	234	+2 Laps
17	Hypercar	63	(Italy) Lamborghini Iron Lynx	(Italy) Mirko Bortolotti; Daniil Kvyat (Italy) Edoardo Mortara	Lamborghini SC63	MI	234	+2 Laps
17	Hypercar	63	(Italy) Lamborghini Iron Lynx	(Italy) Mirko Bortolotti; Daniil Kvyat (Italy) Edoardo Mortara	Lamborghini 3.8 L Turbo V8	MI	234	+2 Laps
18	Hypercar	12	(United Kingdom) Hertz Team Jota	(United Kingdom) Callum Ilott (France) Norman Nato (United Kingdom) Will Stevens	Porsche 963	MI	233	+3 Laps
18	Hypercar	12	(United Kingdom) Hertz Team Jota	(United Kingdom) Callum Ilott (France) Norman Nato (United Kingdom) Will Stevens	Porsche 9RD 4.6 L Turbo V8	MI	233	+3 Laps
19	**LMGT3**	**92**	**(Lithuania) Manthey PureRxcing**	**(Austria) Klaus Bachler (Saint Kitts and Nevis) Alex Malykhin (Germany) Joel Sturm**	**Porsche 911 GT3 R (992)**	G	**214**	**+22 Laps‡**
19	**LMGT3**	**92**	**(Lithuania) Manthey PureRxcing**	**(Austria) Klaus Bachler (Saint Kitts and Nevis) Alex Malykhin (Germany) Joel Sturm**	**Porsche M97/80 4.2 L Flat-6**	G	**214**	**+22 Laps‡**
20	LMGT3	27	(United States) Heart of Racing Team	(United Kingdom) Ian James (Italy) Daniel Mancinelli (Spain) Alex Riberas	Aston Martin Vantage AMR GT3 Evo	G	213	+23 Laps
20	LMGT3	27	(United States) Heart of Racing Team	(United Kingdom) Ian James (Italy) Daniel Mancinelli (Spain) Alex Riberas	Aston Martin M177 4.0 L Turbo V8	G	213	+23 Laps
21	LMGT3	95	(United Kingdom) United Autosports	(Japan) Hiroshi Hamaguchi (Chile) Nico Pino (Japan) Marino Sato	McLaren 720S GT3 Evo	G	213	+23 Laps
21	LMGT3	95	(United Kingdom) United Autosports	(Japan) Hiroshi Hamaguchi (Chile) Nico Pino (Japan) Marino Sato	McLaren M840T 4.0 L Turbo V8	G	213	+23 Laps
22	LMGT3	59	(United Kingdom) United Autosports	(Brazil) Nicolas Costa (United Kingdom) James Cottingham (Switzerland) Grégoire Saucy	McLaren 720S GT3 Evo	G	212	+24 Laps
22	LMGT3	59	(United Kingdom) United Autosports	(Brazil) Nicolas Costa (United Kingdom) James Cottingham (Switzerland) Grégoire Saucy	McLaren M840T 4.0 L Turbo V8	G	212	+24 Laps
23	LMGT3	46	(Belgium) Team WRT	(Oman) Ahmad Al Harthy (Belgium) Maxime Martin (Italy) Valentino Rossi	BMW M4 GT3	G	212	+24 Laps
23	LMGT3	46	(Belgium) Team WRT	(Oman) Ahmad Al Harthy (Belgium) Maxime Martin (Italy) Valentino Rossi	BMW P58 3.0 L Turbo I6	G	212	+24 Laps
24	LMGT3	55	(Italy) Vista AF Corse	(France) François Hériau (United States) Simon Mann (Italy) Alessio Rovera	Ferrari 296 GT3	G	212	+24 Laps
24	LMGT3	55	(Italy) Vista AF Corse	(France) François Hériau (United States) Simon Mann (Italy) Alessio Rovera	Ferrari F163CE 3.0 L Turbo V6	G	212	+24 Laps
25	LMGT3	77	(Germany) Proton Competition	(United Kingdom) Ben Barker (United States) Ryan Hardwick (Canada) Zacharie Robichon	Ford Mustang GT3	G	212	+24 Laps
25	LMGT3	77	(Germany) Proton Competition	(United Kingdom) Ben Barker (United States) Ryan Hardwick (Canada) Zacharie Robichon	Ford Coyote 5.4 L V8	G	212	+24 Laps
26	LMGT3	81	(United Kingdom) TF Sport	(Angola) Rui Andrade (Republic of Ireland) Charlie Eastwood (Belgium) Tom van Rompuy	Chevrolet Corvette Z06 GT3.R	G	212	+24 Laps
26	LMGT3	81	(United Kingdom) TF Sport	(Angola) Rui Andrade (Republic of Ireland) Charlie Eastwood (Belgium) Tom van Rompuy	Chevrolet LT6.R 5.5 L V8	G	212	+24 Laps
27	LMGT3	777	(Japan) D'station Racing	(France) Erwan Bastard (France) Clément Mateu (Denmark) Marco Sørensen	Aston Martin Vantage AMR GT3 Evo	G	212	+24 Laps
27	LMGT3	777	(Japan) D'station Racing	(France) Erwan Bastard (France) Clément Mateu (Denmark) Marco Sørensen	Aston Martin M177 4.0 L Turbo V8	G	212	+24 Laps
28	LMGT3	31	(Belgium) Team WRT	(Brazil) Augusto Farfus (Indonesia) Sean Gelael (United Kingdom) Darren Leung	BMW M4 GT3	G	211	+25 Laps
28	LMGT3	31	(Belgium) Team WRT	(Brazil) Augusto Farfus (Indonesia) Sean Gelael (United Kingdom) Darren Leung	BMW P58 3.0 L Turbo I6	G	211	+25 Laps
29	LMGT3	87	(France) Akkodis ASP Team	(Japan) Takeshi Kimura (Argentina) José María López (France) Esteban Masson	Lexus RC F GT3	G	211	+25 Laps
29	LMGT3	87	(France) Akkodis ASP Team	(Japan) Takeshi Kimura (Argentina) José María López (France) Esteban Masson	Lexus 2UR-GSE 5.4 L V8	G	211	+25 Laps
30	LMGT3	91	(Germany) Manthey EMA	(Austria) Richard Lietz (Netherlands) Morris Schuring (Australia) Yasser Shahin	Porsche 911 GT3 R (992)	G	209	+27 Laps
30	LMGT3	91	(Germany) Manthey EMA	(Austria) Richard Lietz (Netherlands) Morris Schuring (Australia) Yasser Shahin	Porsche M97/80 4.2 L Flat-6	G	209	+27 Laps
31	LMGT3	88	(Germany) Proton Competition	(Norway) Dennis Olsen (Denmark) Mikkel O. Pedersen (Germany) Christian Ried	Ford Mustang GT3	G	208	+28 Laps
31	LMGT3	88	(Germany) Proton Competition	(Norway) Dennis Olsen (Denmark) Mikkel O. Pedersen (Germany) Christian Ried	Ford Coyote 5.4 L V8	G	208	+28 Laps
32	LMGT3	60	(Italy) Iron Lynx	(Italy) Matteo Cressoni (France) Franck Perera (Italy) Claudio Schiavoni	Lamborghini Huracán GT3 Evo 2	G	208	+28 Laps
32	LMGT3	60	(Italy) Iron Lynx	(Italy) Matteo Cressoni (France) Franck Perera (Italy) Claudio Schiavoni	Lamborghini DGF 5.2 L V10	G	208	+28 Laps
33	LMGT3	54	(Italy) Vista AF Corse	(Italy) Francesco Castellacci (Switzerland) Thomas Flohr (Italy) Davide Rigon	Ferrari 296 GT3	G	191	+45 Laps
33	LMGT3	54	(Italy) Vista AF Corse	(Italy) Francesco Castellacci (Switzerland) Thomas Flohr (Italy) Davide Rigon	Ferrari F163CE 3.0 L Turbo V6	G	191	+45 Laps
DNF	Hypercar	11	(Italy) Isotta Fraschini	(United States) Carl Bennett (Canada) Antonio Serravalle (France) Jean-Karl Vernay	Isotta Fraschini Tipo 6-C	MI	149	Retired
DNF	Hypercar	11	(Italy) Isotta Fraschini	(United States) Carl Bennett (Canada) Antonio Serravalle (France) Jean-Karl Vernay	Isotta Fraschini 3.0 L Turbo V6	MI	149	Retired
DNF	LMGT3	85	(Italy) Iron Dames	(Belgium) Sarah Bovy (Switzerland) Rahel Frey (Denmark) Michelle Gatting	Lamborghini Huracán GT3 Evo 2	G	139	Retired
DNF	LMGT3	85	(Italy) Iron Dames	(Belgium) Sarah Bovy (Switzerland) Rahel Frey (Denmark) Michelle Gatting	Lamborghini DGF 5.2 L V10	G	139	Retired
DNF	LMGT3	82	(United Kingdom) TF Sport	(France) Sébastien Baud (Spain) Daniel Juncadella (Japan) Hiroshi Koizumi	Chevrolet Corvette Z06 GT3.R	G	133	Retired
DNF	LMGT3	82	(United Kingdom) TF Sport	(France) Sébastien Baud (Spain) Daniel Juncadella (Japan) Hiroshi Koizumi	Chevrolet LT6.R 5.5 L V8	G	133	Retired

== Standings after the race ==
2024 Hypercar World Endurance Drivers' Championship

Pos	+/-	Driver	Points
1		(France) Kévin Estre (Germany) André Lotterer (Belgium) Laurens Vanthoor	117
2		(Italy) Antonio Fuoco (Spain) Miguel Molina (Denmark) Nicklas Nielsen	98
3		(Japan) Kamui Kobayashi (Netherlands) Nyck de Vries	95
4	1	(Australia) Matt Campbell (Denmark) Michael Christensen (France) Frédéric Makowiecki	71
5	3	(Switzerland) Sébastien Buemi (New Zealand) Brendon Hartley (Japan) Ryō Hirakawa	69

2024 Hypercar World Endurance Manufacturers' Championship

Pos	+/-	Manufacturer	Points
1		(Germany) Porsche	126
2	1	(Japan) Toyota	122
3	1	(Italy) Ferrari	109
4	1	(France) Alpine	25
5	1	(Germany) BMW	25

2024 FIA World Cup for Hypercar Teams

Pos	+/-	No	Team	Points
1		12	(United Kingdom) Hertz Team Jota	140
2		99	(Germany) Proton Competition	86
3		83	(Italy) AF Corse	85
4		38	(United Kingdom) Hertz Team Jota	79

2024 FIA Endurance Trophy for LMGT3 Drivers

Pos	+/-	Driver	Points
1	1	(Austria) Klaus Bachler (Saint Kitts and Nevis) Alex Malykhin (Germany) Joel Sturm	100
2	1	(Austria) Richard Lietz (Netherlands) Morris Schuring (Australia) Yasser Shahin	75
3		(Brazil) Augusto Farfus (Indonesia) Sean Gelael (United Kingdom) Darren Leung	74
4	3	(United Kingdom) Ian James (Italy) Daniel Mancinelli (Spain) Alex Riberas	55
5	1	(France) François Heriau (United States) Simon Mann (Italy) Alessio Rovera	49

2024 FIA Endurance Trophy for LMGT3 Teams

Pos	+/-	No	Team	Points
1	1	92	(Lithuania) Manthey PureRxcing	100
2	1	91	(Germany) Manthey EMA	75
3		31	(Belgium) Team WRT	74
4	3	27	(United States) Heart of Racing Team	55
5	1	55	(Italy) Vista AF Corse	49

== Official recordings ==
- Free Practice 3 | 2024 6 Hours of São Paulo on YouTube
- Full Qualifying and Hyperpole | 2024 6 Hours of São Paulo on YouTube
- Full Race | 2024 6 Hours of São Paulo on YouTube
