= 2025 6 Hours of Fuji =

Sports car endurance race

(Japan) 2025 6 Hours of Fuji
Event information
- Round 7 of 8 in the 2025 FIA World Endurance Championship
- Date: 28 September 2025
- Location: Oyama, Shizuoka
- Venue: Fuji Speedway
- Duration: 6 Hours

Results
- Hypercar

Pole position
- Time: 1:28.236
- Team: (United Kingdom) Cadillac Hertz Team Jota

Winners
- Team: (France) Alpine Endurance Team
- Drivers: (France) Paul-Loup Chatin (Austria) Ferdinand Habsburg (France) Charles Milesi
- LMGT3

Winners
- Team: (United Kingdom) TF Sport
- Drivers: (Angola) Rui Andrade (Republic of Ireland) Charlie Eastwood (Belgium) Tom van Rompuy

The 2025 6 Hours of Fuji was an endurance sportscar racing event held on 28 September 2025, as the seventh of eight rounds of the 2025 FIA World Endurance Championship. It was the twelfth running of the event in its current format in the World Endurance Championship and the 100th race of the championship overall since its inaugural race at the 12 Hours of Sebring in 2012.

== Entry list ==
36 cars entered the race: 18 in Hypercar and 18 in LMGT3.

== Schedule ==
Date	Time (local: JST)	Event
Friday, 26 September	10:15	Free Practice 1
Friday, 26 September	14:30	Free Practice 2
Saturday, 27 September	09:50	Free Practice 3
Saturday, 27 September	14:20	Qualifying - LMGT3
Saturday, 27 September	14:40	Hyperpole - LMGT3
Saturday, 27 September	15:00	Qualifying - Hypercar
Saturday, 27 September	15:20	Hyperpole - Hypercar
Sunday, 28 September	11:00	Race

== Practice ==
Three practice session were held: two were held on Friday, and one was held on Saturday. The sessions on Friday morning and Friday afternoon lasted 90 minutes, while the Saturday session 60 minutes.

== Qualifying ==
=== Qualifying results ===
Pole position winners in each class are marked in bold.

Pos	Class	No.	Entrant	Qualifying	Hyperpole	Grid
1	**Hypercar**	**12**	**(United States) Cadillac Hertz Team Jota**	**1:29.082**	**1:28.236**	1
2	Hypercar	38	(United States) Cadillac Hertz Team Jota	1:29.332	1:28.675	2
3	Hypercar	009	(United States) Aston Martin THOR Team	1:28.935	1:28.705	3
4	Hypercar	93	(France) Peugeot TotalEnergies	1:28.989	1:28.716	4
5	Hypercar	20	(Germany) BMW M Team WRT	1:29.392	1:28.854	5
6	Hypercar	51	(Italy) Ferrari AF Corse	1:29.300	1:28.945	6
7	Hypercar	5	(Germany) Porsche Penske Motorsport	1:29.183	1:29.031	7
8	Hypercar	8	(Japan) Toyota Gazoo Racing	1:29.252	1:29.071	8
9	Hypercar	35	(France) Alpine Endurance Team	1:29.297	1:29.080	9
10	Hypercar	83	(Italy) AF Corse	1:29.330	1:29.245	10
11	Hypercar	007	(United States) Aston Martin THOR Team	1:29.424		11
12	Hypercar	94	(France) Peugeot TotalEnergies	1:29.426		12
13	Hypercar	15	(Germany) BMW M Team WRT	1:29.478		13
14	Hypercar	7	(Japan) Toyota Gazoo Racing	1:29.495		14
15	Hypercar	50	(Italy) Ferrari AF Corse	1:29.506		15
16	Hypercar	36	(France) Alpine Endurance Team	1:29.832		16
17	Hypercar	6	(Germany) Porsche Penske Motorsport	1:29.920		17
18	Hypercar	99	(Germany) Proton Competition	1:30.085		18
19	**LMGT3**	**10**	**(France) Racing Spirit of Léman**	**1:41.234**	**1:39.981**	19
20	LMGT3	95	(United Kingdom) United Autosports	1:40.918	1:40.011	20
21	LMGT3	59	(United Kingdom) United Autosports	1:40.469	1:40.013	21
22	LMGT3	27	(United States) Heart of Racing Team	1:41.154	1:40.387	22
23	LMGT3	92	(Germany) Manthey 1st Phorm	1:41.210	1:40.414	23
24	LMGT3	33	(United Kingdom) TF Sport	1:41.024	1:40.426	24
25	LMGT3	81	(United Kingdom) TF Sport	1:40.952	1:40.490	25
26	LMGT3	54	(Italy) Vista AF Corse	1:41.375	1:40.600	26
27	LMGT3	88	(Germany) Proton Competition	1:41.269	1:40.708	27
28	LMGT3	21	(Italy) Vista AF Corse	1:41.221	1:40.819	28
29	LMGT3	46	(Belgium) Team WRT	1:41.436		29
30	LMGT3	61	(Italy) Iron Lynx	1:41.611		30
31	LMGT3	78	(France) Akkodis ASP Team	1:41.626		31
33	LMGT3	87	(France) Akkodis ASP Team	1:41.886		33
32	LMGT3	31	(Belgium) The Bend Team WRT	1:41.788		32
34	LMGT3	60	(Italy) Iron Lynx	1:41.963		34
35	LMGT3	85	(Italy) Iron Dames	1:42.284		35
36	LMGT3	77	(Germany) Proton Competition	No time		36

== Race ==
The race started at 11:00 JST on Sunday, and ran for six hours.

=== Race results ===
Class winners are in bold and ‡.

Pos	Class	No	Team	Drivers	Chassis	Tyre	Laps	Time/Retired
Pos	Class	No	Team	Drivers	Engine	Tyre	Laps	Time/Retired
1	**Hypercar**	**35**	**(France) Alpine Endurance Team**	**(France) Paul-Loup Chatin** **(Austria) Ferdinand Habsburg** **(France) Charles Milesi**	**Alpine A424**	M	**202**	**6:00:38.167‡**
1	**Hypercar**	**35**	**(France) Alpine Endurance Team**	**(France) Paul-Loup Chatin** **(Austria) Ferdinand Habsburg** **(France) Charles Milesi**	**Alpine V634 3.4 L Turbo V6**	M	**202**	**6:00:38.167‡**
2	Hypercar	93	(France) Peugeot TotalEnergies	(Denmark) Mikkel Jensen (United Kingdom) Paul di Resta (France) Jean-Éric Vergne	Peugeot 9X8	M	202	+7.682
2	Hypercar	93	(France) Peugeot TotalEnergies	(Denmark) Mikkel Jensen (United Kingdom) Paul di Resta (France) Jean-Éric Vergne	Peugeot X6H 2.6 L Turbo V6	M	202	+7.682
3	Hypercar	6	(Germany) Porsche Penske Motorsport	(France) Kévin Estre (Belgium) Laurens Vanthoor	Porsche 963	M	202	+8.167
3	Hypercar	6	(Germany) Porsche Penske Motorsport	(France) Kévin Estre (Belgium) Laurens Vanthoor	Porsche 9RD 4.6 L Turbo V8	M	202	+8.167
4	Hypercar	5	(Germany) Porsche Penske Motorsport	(France) Mathieu Jaminet (France) Julien Andlauer	Porsche 963	M	202	+16.083
4	Hypercar	5	(Germany) Porsche Penske Motorsport	(France) Mathieu Jaminet (France) Julien Andlauer	Porsche 9RD 4.6 L Turbo V8	M	202	+16.083
5	Hypercar	009	(United States) Aston Martin THOR Team	(Spain) Alex Riberas (Denmark) Marco Sørensen	Aston Martin Valkyrie	M	202	+39.761
5	Hypercar	009	(United States) Aston Martin THOR Team	(Spain) Alex Riberas (Denmark) Marco Sørensen	Aston Martin RA 6.5 L V12	M	202	+39.761
6	Hypercar	12	(United States) Cadillac Hertz Team Jota	(United Kingdom) Alex Lynn (France) Norman Nato (United Kingdom) Will Stevens	Cadillac V-Series.R	M	202	+43.567
6	Hypercar	12	(United States) Cadillac Hertz Team Jota	(United Kingdom) Alex Lynn (France) Norman Nato (United Kingdom) Will Stevens	Cadillac LMC55R 5.5 L V8	M	202	+43.567
7	Hypercar	7	(Japan) Toyota Gazoo Racing	(Japan) Kamui Kobayashi (Netherlands) Nyck de Vries (United Kingdom) Mike Conway	Toyota GR010 Hybrid	M	202	+45.031
7	Hypercar	7	(Japan) Toyota Gazoo Racing	(Japan) Kamui Kobayashi (Netherlands) Nyck de Vries (United Kingdom) Mike Conway	Toyota H8909 3.5 L Turbo V6	M	202	+45.031
8	Hypercar	20	(Germany) BMW M Team WRT	(Netherlands) Robin Frijns (Germany) René Rast (South Africa) Sheldon van der Linde	BMW M Hybrid V8	M	202	+50.362
8	Hypercar	20	(Germany) BMW M Team WRT	(Netherlands) Robin Frijns (Germany) René Rast (South Africa) Sheldon van der Linde	BMW P66/3 4.0 L Turbo V8	M	202	+50.362
9	Hypercar	83	(Italy) AF Corse	(United Kingdom) Phil Hanson (Poland) Robert Kubica (China) Yifei Ye	Ferrari 499P	M	202	+58.989
9	Hypercar	83	(Italy) AF Corse	(United Kingdom) Phil Hanson (Poland) Robert Kubica (China) Yifei Ye	Ferrari F163 3.0 L Turbo V6	M	202	+58.989
10	Hypercar	94	(France) Peugeot TotalEnergies	(France) Loïc Duval (Denmark) Malthe Jakobsen (Belgium) Stoffel Vandoorne	Peugeot 9X8	M	202	+1:11.542
10	Hypercar	94	(France) Peugeot TotalEnergies	(France) Loïc Duval (Denmark) Malthe Jakobsen (Belgium) Stoffel Vandoorne	Peugeot X6H 2.6 L Turbo V6	M	202	+1:11.542
11	Hypercar	99	(Germany) Proton Competition	(Switzerland) Neel Jani (Chile) Nico Pino (Argentina) Nicolás Varrone	Porsche 963	M	202	+1:14.826
11	Hypercar	99	(Germany) Proton Competition	(Switzerland) Neel Jani (Chile) Nico Pino (Argentina) Nicolás Varrone	Porsche 9RD 4.6 L Turbo V8	M	202	+1:14.826
12	Hypercar	50	(Italy) Ferrari AF Corse	(Italy) Antonio Fuoco (Spain) Miguel Molina (Denmark) Nicklas Nielsen	Ferrari 499P	M	202	+2:08.878
12	Hypercar	50	(Italy) Ferrari AF Corse	(Italy) Antonio Fuoco (Spain) Miguel Molina (Denmark) Nicklas Nielsen	Ferrari F163 3.0 L Turbo V6	M	202	+2:08.878
13	Hypercar	38	(United States) Cadillac Hertz Team Jota	(New Zealand) Earl Bamber (France) Sébastien Bourdais (United Kingdom) Jenson Button	Cadillac V-Series.R	M	201	+1 Lap
13	Hypercar	38	(United States) Cadillac Hertz Team Jota	(New Zealand) Earl Bamber (France) Sébastien Bourdais (United Kingdom) Jenson Button	Cadillac LMC55R 5.5 L V8	M	201	+1 Lap
14	Hypercar	36	(France) Alpine Endurance Team	(France) Jules Gounon (France) Frédéric Makowiecki (Germany) Mick Schumacher	Alpine A424	M	201	+1 Lap
14	Hypercar	36	(France) Alpine Endurance Team	(France) Jules Gounon (France) Frédéric Makowiecki (Germany) Mick Schumacher	Alpine V634 3.4 L Turbo V6	M	201	+1 Lap
15	Hypercar	51	(Italy) Ferrari AF Corse	(United Kingdom) James Calado (Italy) Antonio Giovinazzi (Italy) Alessandro Pier Guidi	Ferrari 499P	M	201	+1 Lap
15	Hypercar	51	(Italy) Ferrari AF Corse	(United Kingdom) James Calado (Italy) Antonio Giovinazzi (Italy) Alessandro Pier Guidi	Ferrari F163 3.0 L Turbo V6	M	201	+1 Lap
16	Hypercar	8	(Japan) Toyota Gazoo Racing	(Switzerland) Sébastien Buemi (New Zealand) Brendon Hartley (Japan) Ryō Hirakawa	Toyota GR010 Hybrid	M	200	+2 laps
16	Hypercar	8	(Japan) Toyota Gazoo Racing	(Switzerland) Sébastien Buemi (New Zealand) Brendon Hartley (Japan) Ryō Hirakawa	Toyota H8909 3.5 L Turbo V6	M	200	+2 laps
17	**LMGT3**	**81**	**(United Kingdom) TF Sport**	**(Angola) Rui Andrade** **(Republic of Ireland) Charlie Eastwood** **(Belgium) Tom van Rompuy**	**Chevrolet Corvette Z06 GT3.R**	G	**185**	**+17 Laps‡**
17	**LMGT3**	**81**	**(United Kingdom) TF Sport**	**(Angola) Rui Andrade** **(Republic of Ireland) Charlie Eastwood** **(Belgium) Tom van Rompuy**	**Chevrolet LT6.R 5.5 L V8**	G	**185**	**+17 Laps‡**
18	LMGT3	21	(Italy) Vista AF Corse	(France) François Heriau (United States) Simon Mann (Italy) Alessio Rovera	Ferrari 296 GT3	G	185	+17 Laps
18	LMGT3	21	(Italy) Vista AF Corse	(France) François Heriau (United States) Simon Mann (Italy) Alessio Rovera	Ferrari F163CE 3.0 L Turbo V6	G	185	+17 Laps
19	LMGT3	31	(Belgium) The Bend Team WRT	Timur Boguslavskiy (Brazil) Augusto Farfus (Australia) Yasser Shahin	BMW M4 GT3	G	185	+17 Laps
19	LMGT3	31	(Belgium) The Bend Team WRT	Timur Boguslavskiy (Brazil) Augusto Farfus (Australia) Yasser Shahin	BMW P58 3.0 L Turbo I6	G	185	+17 Laps
20	LMGT3	46	(Belgium) Team WRT	(Oman) Ahmad Al Harthy (Italy) Valentino Rossi (South Africa) Kelvin van der Linde	BMW M4 GT3	G	185	+17 Laps
20	LMGT3	46	(Belgium) Team WRT	(Oman) Ahmad Al Harthy (Italy) Valentino Rossi (South Africa) Kelvin van der Linde	BMW P58 3.0 L Turbo I6	G	185	+17 Laps
21	LMGT3	92	(Germany) Manthey 1st Phorm	(United States) Ryan Hardwick (Austria) Richard Lietz (Italy) Riccardo Pera	Porsche 911 GT3 R (992)	G	185	+17 Laps
21	LMGT3	92	(Germany) Manthey 1st Phorm	(United States) Ryan Hardwick (Austria) Richard Lietz (Italy) Riccardo Pera	Porsche M97/80 4.2 L Flat-6	G	185	+17 Laps
22	LMGT3	54	(Italy) Vista AF Corse	(Italy) Francesco Castellacci (Switzerland) Thomas Flohr (Italy) Davide Rigon	Ferrari 296 GT3	G	185	+17 Laps
22	LMGT3	54	(Italy) Vista AF Corse	(Italy) Francesco Castellacci (Switzerland) Thomas Flohr (Italy) Davide Rigon	Ferrari F163CE 3.0 L Turbo V6	G	185	+17 Laps
23	LMGT3	27	(United States) Heart of Racing Team	(Italy) Mattia Drudi (United Kingdom) Ian James (Canada) Zacharie Robichon	Aston Martin Vantage AMR GT3 Evo	G	184	+18 Laps
23	LMGT3	27	(United States) Heart of Racing Team	(Italy) Mattia Drudi (United Kingdom) Ian James (Canada) Zacharie Robichon	Aston Martin M177 4.0 L Turbo V8	G	184	+18 Laps
24	LMGT3	61	(Italy) Iron Lynx	(Australia) Martin Berry (Netherlands) Lin Hodenius (Belgium) Maxime Martin	Mercedes-AMG GT3 Evo	G	184	+18 Laps
24	LMGT3	61	(Italy) Iron Lynx	(Australia) Martin Berry (Netherlands) Lin Hodenius (Belgium) Maxime Martin	Mercedes-AMG M159 6.2 L V8	G	184	+18 Laps
25	LMGT3	78	(France) Akkodis ASP Team	(United Kingdom) Ben Barnicoat (Germany) Finn Gehrsitz (France) Arnold Robin	Lexus RC F GT3	G	184	+18 Laps
25	LMGT3	78	(France) Akkodis ASP Team	(United Kingdom) Ben Barnicoat (Germany) Finn Gehrsitz (France) Arnold Robin	Lexus 2UR-GSE 5.4 L V8	G	184	+18 Laps
26	LMGT3	95	(United Kingdom) United Autosports	(Indonesia) Sean Gelael (United Kingdom) Darren Leung (Japan) Marino Sato	McLaren 720S GT3 Evo	G	184	+18 Laps
26	LMGT3	95	(United Kingdom) United Autosports	(Indonesia) Sean Gelael (United Kingdom) Darren Leung (Japan) Marino Sato	McLaren M840T 4.0 L Turbo V8	G	184	+18 Laps
27	LMGT3	33	(United Kingdom) TF Sport	(United Kingdom) Jonny Edgar (Spain) Daniel Juncadella (United States) Ben Keating	Chevrolet Corvette Z06 GT3.R	G	184	+18 Laps
27	LMGT3	33	(United Kingdom) TF Sport	(United Kingdom) Jonny Edgar (Spain) Daniel Juncadella (United States) Ben Keating	Chevrolet LT6.R 5.5 L V8	G	184	+18 Laps
28	LMGT3	77	(Germany) Proton Competition	(United Kingdom) Ben Barker (Portugal) Bernardo Sousa (United Kingdom) Ben Tuck	Ford Mustang GT3	G	184	+18 Laps
28	LMGT3	77	(Germany) Proton Competition	(United Kingdom) Ben Barker (Portugal) Bernardo Sousa (United Kingdom) Ben Tuck	Ford Coyote 5.4 L V8	G	184	+18 Laps
29	LMGT3	85	(Italy) Iron Dames	(Switzerland) Rahel Frey (Denmark) Michelle Gatting (France) Célia Martin	Porsche 911 GT3 R (992)	G	184	+18 Laps
29	LMGT3	85	(Italy) Iron Dames	(Switzerland) Rahel Frey (Denmark) Michelle Gatting (France) Célia Martin	Porsche M97/80 4.2 L Flat-6	G	184	+18 Laps
30	LMGT3	59	(United Kingdom) United Autosports	(France) Sébastien Baud (United Kingdom) James Cottingham (Switzerland) Grégoire Saucy	McLaren 720S GT3 Evo	G	184	+18 Laps
30	LMGT3	59	(United Kingdom) United Autosports	(France) Sébastien Baud (United Kingdom) James Cottingham (Switzerland) Grégoire Saucy	McLaren M840T 4.0 L Turbo V8	G	184	+18 Laps
31	LMGT3	87	(France) Akkodis ASP Team	(Argentina) José María López (Austria) Clemens Schmid (Romania) Răzvan Umbrărescu	Lexus RC F GT3	G	184	+18 Laps
31	LMGT3	87	(France) Akkodis ASP Team	(Argentina) José María López (Austria) Clemens Schmid (Romania) Răzvan Umbrărescu	Lexus 2UR-GSE 5.4 L V8	G	184	+18 Laps
32	LMGT3	60	(Italy) Iron Lynx	(United Kingdom) Andrew Gilbert (United Kingdom) Lorcan Hanafin (Spain) Fran Rueda	Mercedes-AMG GT3 Evo	G	183	+19 Laps
32	LMGT3	60	(Italy) Iron Lynx	(United Kingdom) Andrew Gilbert (United Kingdom) Lorcan Hanafin (Spain) Fran Rueda	Mercedes-AMG M159 6.2 L V8	G	183	+19 Laps
33	LMGT3	10	(France) Racing Spirit of Léman	(Brazil) Eduardo Barrichello (France) Valentin Hasse-Clot (United States) Anthony McIntosh	Aston Martin Vantage AMR GT3 Evo	G	183	+19 Laps
33	LMGT3	10	(France) Racing Spirit of Léman	(Brazil) Eduardo Barrichello (France) Valentin Hasse-Clot (United States) Anthony McIntosh	Aston Martin M177 4.0 L Turbo V8	G	183	+19 Laps
Ret	LMGT3	88	(Germany) Proton Competition	(Italy) Stefano Gattuso (Italy) Giammarco Levorato (Norway) Dennis Olsen	Ford Mustang GT3	G	143	Collision damage
Ret	LMGT3	88	(Germany) Proton Competition	(Italy) Stefano Gattuso (Italy) Giammarco Levorato (Norway) Dennis Olsen	Ford Coyote 5.4 L V8	G	143	Collision damage
Ret	Hypercar	007	(United States) Aston Martin THOR Team	(United Kingdom) Tom Gamble (United Kingdom) Harry Tincknell	Aston Martin Valkyrie	M	113	Collision
Ret	Hypercar	007	(United States) Aston Martin THOR Team	(United Kingdom) Tom Gamble (United Kingdom) Harry Tincknell	Aston Martin RA 6.5 L V12	M	113	Collision
Ret	Hypercar	15	(Germany) BMW M Team WRT	(Denmark) Kevin Magnussen (Switzerland) Raffaele Marciello (Belgium) Dries Vanthoor	BMW M Hybrid V8	M	68	Accident
Ret	Hypercar	15	(Germany) BMW M Team WRT	(Denmark) Kevin Magnussen (Switzerland) Raffaele Marciello (Belgium) Dries Vanthoor	BMW P66/3 4.0 L Turbo V8	M	68	Accident

== Sources ==
FIA World Endurance Championship
Previous race: Lone Star Le Mans	2025 season	Next race: 8 Hours of Bahrain
