= Charles Milesi =

French racing driver (born 2001)

- Milesi at Silverstone Circuit in 2026
- Nationality: (France) French
- Born: Charles Roger Claude Milesi; 4 March 2001 (age 25) Chaumont, France

FIA World Endurance Championship career
- Debut season: 2019–20
- Current team: Alpine Endurance Team
- Categorisation: FIA Silver (2020–2021); FIA Gold (2022–2025); FIA Platinum (2026–)
- Car number: 35
- Former teams: SO24-HAS by Graff, Team WRT
- Starts: 44
- Wins: 4
- Podiums: 8
- Poles: 1
- Fastest laps: 6
- Best finish: 1st (LMP2) in 2021

Previous series
- 2020–2025 2020 2019 2017-2018 2017: European Le Mans Series; Super Formula; Japanese Formula 3 Championship; Formula Renault Eurocup; French F4 Championship

Championship titles
- 2025: European Le Mans Series - LMP2

Charles Roger Claude Milesi (born 4 March 2001) is a French racing driver who currently competes in the Hypercar class of the FIA World Endurance Championship for Alpine. After achieving several wins during a short single-seater career, Milesi attained success in endurance racing, winning the 2021 FIA World Endurance Championship and 2021 24 Hours of Le Mans in the LMP2 class. He also won the 2025 European Le Mans Series with VDS Panis Racing. In 2024, Milesi became part of the Alpine Hypercar programme, with whom he scored his first overall World Championship victory at the 2025 6 Hours of Fuji.

Milesi is the son of Patrice Milesi, who is also a racing driver.

== Career ==
=== Early career ===
After success in karting, Milesi's driving career began in 2017 in Formula Renault. For two years, he competed in various series of this racing formula. In 2018, he reached seventh place in the Formula Renault Eurocup.

In 2019, at the end of the 8 Hours of Bahrain, a WEC rookie test was organized on the same circuit. Milesi thus had the opportunity to make his first laps in the hands of a prototype for the Dutch team Racing Team Nederland.

In 2020, following the withdrawal of Alexandre Cougnaud and a positive test at the end of the 2020 Castellet 240 with Graff Racing, Milesi had the opportunity to join this same team in order to participate in the 24 Hours of Le Mans in the hands of an Oreca 07 in the LMP2 category with Vincent Capillaire and James Allen as co-drivers. Unfortunately, in their first participation, Milesi could not see the checkered flag after going off the track in the last hour of the race when Allen was at the wheel. With this first experience in the hands of an LMP2 and following the withdrawal of the Mexican driver Memo Rojas, Milesi had the opportunity to join the American team DragonSpeed in order to participate in the 4 Hours of Monza. This race went in the best possible way because the car finished in third position. Unfortunately, a problem with the height of the non-compliant diffuser, the car was disqualified at the end of the race. Milesi then finished his year by taking part in the final of the Michelin Le Mans Cup with the CD Sport team in the hands of a Ligier JS P320.

Milesi also competed in the Super Formula Championship in the back end of 2020, racing for Buzz Racing with B-MAX.

=== Endurance racing ===
==== 2021 ====
In 2021, Milesi started his season participating in the 24 Hours of Daytona with the Dutch team Racing Team Nederland in the hands of an Oreca 07 in the LMP2 category with Dutch drivers Giedo van der Garde, Frits van Eerd and Job van Uitert as teammates. That year, the Frenchman's main campaign would lie in the FIA World Endurance Championship, where he partnered Robin Frijns and Ferdinand Habsburg at newcomers Team WRT. Having started the season slowly with tenth and fourth at Spa-Francorchamps and Portimão respectively, the team would bounce back with a maiden podium at the 6 Hours of Monza, where, despite being categorized as a silver driver amongst a slew of platinum and gold drivers, Milesi scored pole position in the LMP2 class. Encouraged by the result, the outfit performed strongly during the 24 Hours of Le Mans, leading into Sunday afternoon before encountering issues that meant that the sister WRT car looked to be on course to win the race. However, due to a car failure, the No. 41 WRT stopped on the final lap, meaning that Milesi, Frijns and Habsburg were able to take the lead and win the race, finishing less than a second ahead of the Nr. 28 Jota car. Another win followed at the 6 Hours of Bahrain, which put the team into the championship lead, before Milesi and his teammates were able to claim the LMP2 world title one week later at the 8 Hours of Bahrain.

Near the end of the year, Milesi also competed in two rounds of the European Le Mans Series with Cool Racing, where he scored back-to-back pole positions.

==== 2022 ====
The following year, Milesi would remain in the WEC, moving to the Richard Mille Racing Team to drive alongside Lilou Wadoux and Sébastien Ogier. With those two drivers being rookies to the LMP2 car, the team struggled, ending up ninth in the teams' standings, having finished ninth at Le Mans.

==== 2023 ====
Milesi remained with the outfit that had rebranded to the Alpine Elf Team for the 2023 season, this time being partnered by Julien Canal and Matthieu Vaxivière. Milesi showed his pace by setting the fastest race lap on four occasions, as the lineup overcame a slow start to the season by finishing fourth at Le Mans and second in Monza, leaving the team seventh in the LMP2 standings.

=== Alpine factory driver ===
==== 2024 ====
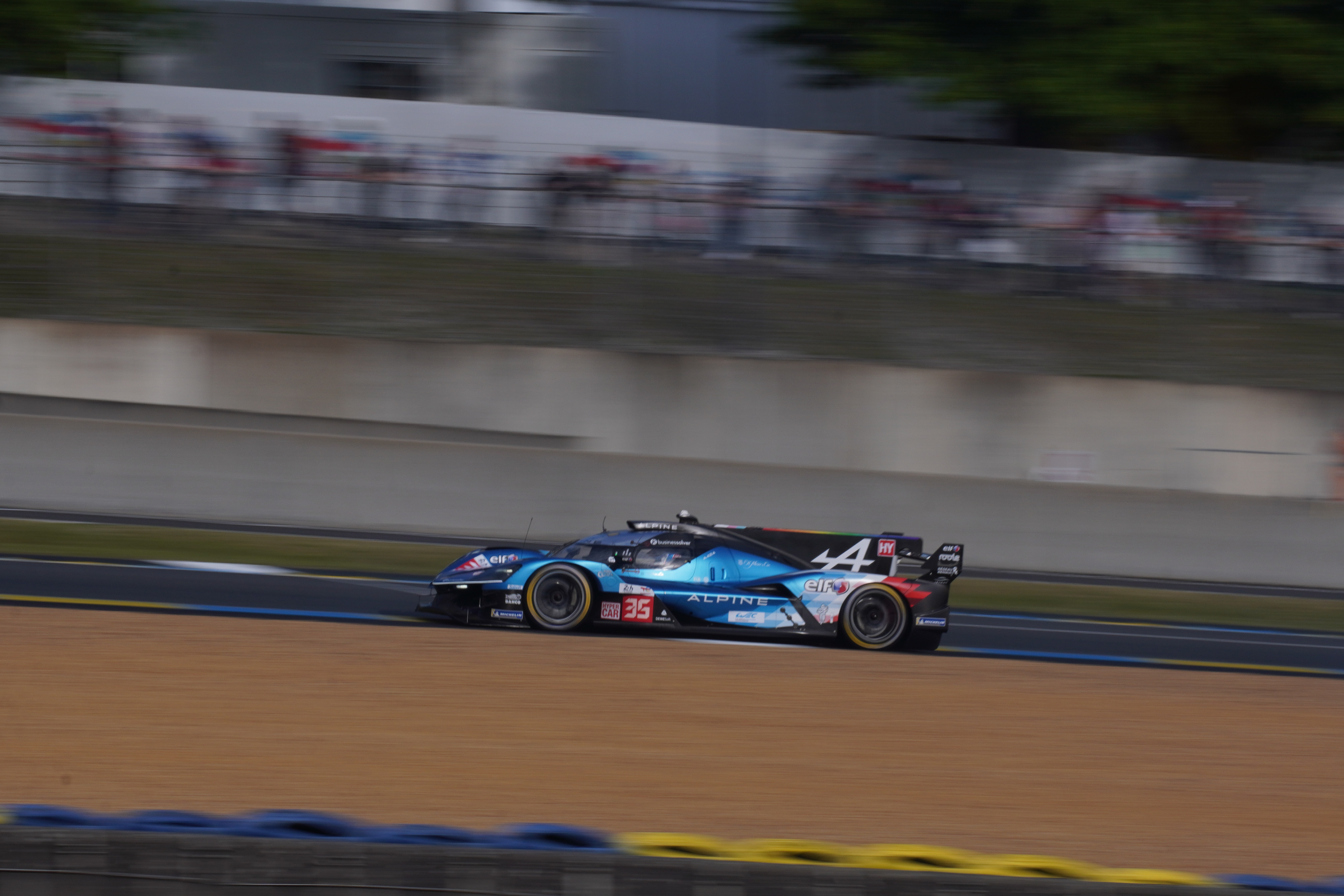
The #35 Alpine A424 at the 2024 24 Hours of Le Mans

Ahead of the 2024 WEC season it was announced that Milesi would become part of Alpine's lineup in the Hypercar category, driving an Alpine A424 alongside Paul-Loup Chatin and 2021 teammate Habsburg. After scoring the team's first points with a seventh place in Qatar, the trio finished 13th in Imola and ninth at Spa. At Le Mans, the No. 35 retired in the evening with an engine failure. Following a 12th place in São Paulo the trio achieved a fifth place in Austin, where Milesi put the car fourth in qualifying. The No. 35 then took seventh at Fuji, missing out on a podium late in the race after Milesi was penalised for causing a collision with the No. 81 TF Sport entry. Thanks to a late charging drive by Chatin, the No. 35 finished a season-best fourth in Bahrain, thus securing an unexpected fourth place for Alpine in the manufacturers' standings.

In addition, Milesi took part in the ELMS, partnering LMP2 rookie Arthur Leclerc and silver driver Manuel Maldonado at Panis Racing by TDS. After a pair of points finishes to start off the year, Milesi took pole in a competitive qualifying session at Imola. During the race, a slower stop for rivals AO by TF allowed Milesi to jump into a secure lead and cross the finish line in first position; a post-race penalty for an alleged virtual safety car infringement that originally demoted Panis Racing to second was later overturned, allowing the team to keep the victory. Milesi battled for the podium in the closing stages of the Spa race, but quickly fell to sixth due to high tyre wear. Tyre degradation cost Milesi again at Mugello, as he was passed by Luca Ghiotto for third place near the end. The team remained in title contention at the final round in Portimão, where Milesi took his second pole position of the year, but ended up finishing fourth overall after Milesi got penalised for causing a final-hour collision with Felipe Drugovich.

==== 2025 ====
Milesi remained with Alpine for the 2025 WEC campaign, once again partnering Chatin and Habsburg in the No. 35. The team initially struggled to get results, with their only points finish from the opening three races being an eighth place at Spa. Milesi and his teammates finished ninth overall at Le Mans, before a battery issue with the hybrid system caused them to finish 18th in São Paulo. In Austin, Alpine particularly struggled with the weekend's wet conditions, as the No. 35 finished 11th. The 6 Hours of Fuji proved to be the highlight of the year for Alpine: having run second, Milesi and the team opted to take just two new tyres at the final pit stop, causing Milesi to jump ahead of the leading Peugeot. Milesi remained first until the end, earning Alpine their first Hypercar victory. This was also the first overall victory in WEC history with a fully FIA Gold-rated lineup. Despite finishing 11th at the Bahrain season finale, the No. 35 was able to outscore the sister car in the championship.

During 2025, Milesi again contested a season of the European Le Mans Series, driving for the renamed VDS Panis Racing alongside Esteban Masson and Oliver Gray. After finishing third overall at Barcelona, the team claimed sixth in class at Le Castellet. In Imola, a strong stint from Masson earned the No. 48 Panis entry the lead during the middle part of the race, one that Milesi was able to stretch out in the final stint on his way to victory. The trio of Gray, Masson, and Milesi then achieved a commanding win at Spa to extend their championship advantage. A penalty for Gray caused the team to finish eighth in class at Silverstone, teeing up a title decider with the No. 18 IDEC Sport crew, which was now just six points behind the No. 48. During the Portimão finale, another dominant drive allowed Milesi and his teammates to win the race and clinch the ELMS title.

During the winter, Milesi partnered Ferrari factory driver Antonio Fuoco and amateur driver Roberto Lacorte at Cetilar Racing in the 2025–26 Asian Le Mans Series. The team swept the opening weekend at Sepang, with strong late stints by Fuoco in both races earning the No. 47 two victories. At Dubai however, their championship advantage disappeared, as a second place in race 1 was followed by a post-race penalty in race 2 which saw them finish fourth. Lacorte then caused a red flag in qualifying at Abu Dhabi, forcing Milesi to start both races and giving Cetilar Racing a huge disadvantage; they only scored a lone point from the weekend and finished second in the standings. Milesi was named male athlete of the year by Le Bien Public in 2025, having previously received the award in 2021.

==== 2026 ====
For his third year in the WEC's top class, Milesi returned to the No. 35 Alpine, driving alongside Habsburg and new signing António Félix da Costa.

== Racing record ==
=== Racing career summary ===
| Season | Series | Team | Races | Wins | Poles | FLaps | Podiums | Points | Position |
|---|---|---|---|---|---|---|---|---|---|
| 2017 | French F4 Championship | FFSA Academy | 18 | 4 | 2 | 4 | 7 | 118 | 7th |
| 2017 | Formula Renault NEC | R-ace GP | 11 | 1 | 0 | 0 | 3 | 97 | 6th |
| 2017 | Formula Renault Eurocup | R-ace GP | 5 | 0 | 0 | 0 | 0 | 0 | NC† |
| 2018 | Formula Renault Eurocup | R-ace GP | 20 | 2 | 2 | 2 | 4 | 122.5 | 7th |
| 2018 | Formula Renault NEC | R-ace GP | 4 | 0 | 1 | 1 | 1 | 0 | NC† |
| 2018 | Toyota Racing Series | MTEC Motorsport | 15 | 0 | 0 | 0 | 1 | 504 | 11th |
| 2019 | Japanese Formula 3 Championship | OIRC team YTB | 15 | 0 | 0 | 0 | 0 | 13 | 9th |
| 2020 | Super Formula | Buzz Racing with B-Max | 3 | 0 | 0 | 0 | 0 | 0 | 21st |
| 2020 | 24 Hours of Le Mans - LMP2 | SO24-HAS By Graff | 1 | 0 | 0 | 0 | 0 | N/A | DNF |
| 2020 | European Le Mans Series - LMP2 | DragonSpeed USA | 1 | 0 | 0 | 0 | 0 | 0 | NC |
| 2021 | FIA World Endurance Championship - LMP2 | Team WRT | 6 | 3 | 1 | 0 | 4 | 151 | **1st** |
| 2021 | 24 Hours of Le Mans - LMP2 | Team WRT | 1 | 1 | 0 | 0 | 1 | N/A | **1st** |
| 2021 | European Le Mans Series - LMP2 | Cool Racing | 2 | 0 | 2 | 2 | 0 | 22 | 17th |
| 2021 | IMSA SportsCar Championship - LMP2 | Racing Team Nederland | 1 | 0 | 0 | 0 | 0 | 0 | NC‡ |
| 2022 | FIA World Endurance Championship - LMP2 | Richard Mille Racing Team | 6 | 0 | 0 | 0 | 0 | 30 | 12th |
| 2022 | 24 Hours of Le Mans - LMP2 | Richard Mille Racing Team | 1 | 0 | 0 | 0 | 0 | N/A | 9th |
| 2022 | Le Mans Cup - LMP3 | AT Racing Team | 1 | 0 | 0 | 0 | 0 | 12 | 17th |
| 2023 | FIA World Endurance Championship - LMP2 | Alpine Elf Team | 7 | 0 | 0 | 4 | 2 | 83 | 7th |
| 2023 | 24 Hours of Le Mans - LMP2 | Alpine Elf Team | 1 | 0 | 0 | 0 | 0 | N/A | 4th |
| 2024 | FIA World Endurance Championship - Hypercar | Alpine Endurance Team | 8 | 0 | 0 | 1 | 0 | 30 | 17th |
| 2024 | European Le Mans Series - LMP2 | Panis Racing by TDS | 6 | 1 | 2 | 1 | 1 | 61 | 4th |
| 2024 | IMSA SportsCar Championship - LMP2 | TDS Racing | 1 | 0 | 0 | 0 | 0 | 205 | 57th |
| 2025 | FIA World Endurance Championship - Hypercar | Alpine Endurance Team | 8 | 1 | 0 | 0 | 1 | 37 | 14th |
| 2025 | European Le Mans Series - LMP2 | VDS Panis Racing | 6 | 3 | 1 | 0 | 4 | 106 | **1st** |
| 2025 | IMSA SportsCar Championship - LMP2 | TDS Racing | 1 | 0 | 0 | 1 | 0 | 256 | 51st |
| 2025-26 | Asian Le Mans Series - LMP2 | Cetilar Racing | 6 | 2 | 0 | 1 | 3 | 81 | **2nd** |
| 2026 | IMSA SportsCar Championship - LMP2 | TDS Racing | 2 | 0 | 0 | 0 | 0 | 480 | 28th |
| 2026 | European Le Mans Series - LMP2 | CLX Motorsport | 6 | 0 | 0 | 0 | 1 | 38 | 9th |
| 2026 | FIA World Endurance Championship - Hypercar | Alpine Endurance Team | 8 | 0 | 0 | 1 | 1 | 57 | 12th |
| 2026-27 | Asian Le Mans Series - LMP2 | Proton Competition | | | | | | | |

^{‡} Points only counted towards the Michelin Endurance Cup, and not the overall LMP2 Championship.

=== Complete French F4 Championship results ===
(key) (Races in bold indicate pole position) (Races in italics indicate fastest lap)

| Year | 1 | 2 | 3 | 4 | 5 | 6 | 7 | 8 | 9 | 10 | 11 | 12 | 13 | 14 | 15 | 16 | 17 | 18 | 19 | 20 | 21 | Pos | Points |
|---|---|---|---|---|---|---|---|---|---|---|---|---|---|---|---|---|---|---|---|---|---|---|---|
| 2017 | NOG; 1; 4 | NOG; 2; 3 | NOG; 3; 4 | MNZ; 1 Ret | MNZ; 2; 8 | MNZ; 3; 1 | PAU; 1; 11 | PAU; 2; 10 | PAU; 3; 8 | SPA; 1 DNS | SPA; 2 DNS | SPA; 3 DNS | MAG; 1; 3 | MAG; 2; 2 | MAG; 3; 1 | CAT; 1; 1 | CAT; 2; 6 | CAT; 3; 1 | LEC; 1; 6 | LEC; 2; 8 | LEC; 3; 12 | 7th | 118 |

=== Complete Formula Renault NEC results ===
(key) (Races in bold indicate pole position) (Races in italics indicate fastest lap)

| Year | Entrant | 1 | 2 | 3 | 4 | 5 | 6 | 7 | 8 | 9 | 10 | 11 | 12 | DC | Points |
|---|---|---|---|---|---|---|---|---|---|---|---|---|---|---|---|
| 2017 | R-ace GP | MNZ; 1 Ret | MNZ; 2; 8 | ASS; 1; 3 | ASS; 2 Ret | NÜR; 1 DSQ | NÜR; 2; 7 | SPA; 1; 23 | SPA; 2; 20 | SPA; 3 Ret | HOC; 1; 13 | HOC; 2; 12 | | 7th | 106 |
| 2018 | R-ace GP | PAU; 1; 4 | PAU; 2 Ret | **MNZ**; **1**; 5 | MNZ; 2; 2 | SPA; 1; 10 | SPA; 2; 13 | HUN; 1; 9 | HUN; 2; 12 | NÜR; 1; 7 | NÜR; 2; 3 | HOC; 1; 10 | HOC; 2; 8 | 9th | 57 |

=== Complete Formula Renault Eurocup results ===
(key) (Races in bold indicate pole position) (Races in italics indicate fastest lap)

| Year | Team | 1 | 2 | 3 | 4 | 5 | 6 | 7 | 8 | 9 | 10 | 11 | 12 | 13 | 14 | 15 | 16 | 17 | 18 | 19 | 20 | 21 | 22 | 23 | Pos | Points |
|---|---|---|---|---|---|---|---|---|---|---|---|---|---|---|---|---|---|---|---|---|---|---|---|---|---|---|
| 2017 | R-ace GP | MNZ; 1 | MNZ; 2 | SIL; 1 | SIL; 2 | PAU; 1 | PAU; 2 | MON; 1 | MON; 2 | HUN; 1 | HUN; 2 | HUN; 3 | NÜR; 1 Ret | NÜR; 2 Ret | RBR; 1 | RBR; 2 | LEC; 1; 6 | LEC; 2; 9 | SPA; 1; 23 | SPA; 2; 20 | SPA; 3 Ret | CAT; 1; 9 | CAT; 2 Ret | CAT; 3 DNS | NC† | 0 |
| 2018 | R-ace GP | LEC; 1; 9 | LEC; 2; 12 | MNZ; 1; 7 | MNZ; 2; 19 | SIL; 1; 7 | **SIL**; **2**; 1 | MON; 1; 2 | **MON**; **2**; 1 | RBR; 1; 10 | RBR; 2; 13 | SPA; 1; 10 | SPA; 2; 13 | HUN; 1; 9 | HUN; 2; 12 | NÜR; 1; 7 | NÜR; 2; 3 | HOC; 1; 10 | HOC; 2; 8 | CAT; 1; 5 | CAT; 2; 10 | | | | 7th | 122.5 |

^{†} As Milesi was a guest driver, he was ineligible for points.

=== Complete Toyota Racing Series results ===
(key) (Races in bold indicate pole position) (Races in italics indicate fastest lap)

| Year | Team | 1 | 2 | 3 | 4 | 5 | 6 | 7 | 8 | 9 | 10 | 11 | 12 | 13 | 14 | 15 | DC | Points |
|---|---|---|---|---|---|---|---|---|---|---|---|---|---|---|---|---|---|---|
| 2018 | MTEC Motorsport | RUA; 1; 9 | RUA; 2; 7 | RUA; 3; 5 | TER; 1; 13 | TER; 2; 12 | TER; 3; 11 | HMP; 1; 10 | HMP; 2 Ret | HMP; 3; 6 | TAU; 1; 11 | TAU; 2; 12 | TAU; 3; 8 | MAN; 1; 12 | MAN; 2; 11 | MAN; 3; 3 | 11th | 504 |

=== Complete Japanese Formula 3 Championship results ===
(key) (Races in bold indicate pole position) (Races in italics indicate fastest lap)

| Year | Team | Engine | 1 | 2 | 3 | 4 | 5 | 6 | 7 | 8 | 9 | 10 | 11 | 12 | 13 | 14 | 15 | 16 | 17 | 18 | 19 | 20 | Pos | Points |
|---|---|---|---|---|---|---|---|---|---|---|---|---|---|---|---|---|---|---|---|---|---|---|---|---|
| 2019 | OIRC team YTB | Volkswagen | SUZ; 1; 9 | SUZ; 2; 6 | AUT; 1; 10 | AUT; 2; 7 | AUT; 3; 7 | OKA; 1; 4 | OKA; 2; 5 | OKA; 3; 5 | SUG; 1 Ret | SUG; 2 DNS | FUJ; 1 WD | FUJ; 2 WD | SUG; 1 | SUG; 2 | SUG; 3 | MOT; 1; 11 | MOT; 2; 4 | MOT; 3; 5 | OKA; 1; 7 | OKA; 2; 9 | 9th | 13 |

=== Complete Super Formula results ===
| Year | Team | Engine | 1 | 2 | 3 | 4 | 5 | 6 | 7 | DC | Points |
|---|---|---|---|---|---|---|---|---|---|---|---|
| 2020 | Buzz Racing with B-Max | Honda | MOT | OKA | SUG | AUT; 15 | SUZ; 11 | SUZ; 13 | FUJ; DNS | 21st | 0 |

=== Complete FIA World Endurance Championship results ===
(key) (Races in bold indicate pole position) (Races in italics indicate fastest lap)

| Year | Entrant | Class | Chassis | Engine | 1 | 2 | 3 | 4 | 5 | 6 | 7 | 8 | Rank | Points |
|---|---|---|---|---|---|---|---|---|---|---|---|---|---|---|
| 2019–20 | SO24-HAS By Graff | LMP2 | Oreca 07 | Gibson GK428 4.2 L V8 | SIL | FUJ | SHA | BHR | COA | SPA | LMS; Ret | BHR | NC† | 0 |
| 2021 | Team WRT | LMP2 | Oreca 07 | Gibson GK428 4.2 L V8 | SPA; 10 | ALG; 4 | **MNZ**; 2 | LMS; 1 | BHR; 1 | BHR; 1 | | | 1st | 151 |
| 2022 | Richard Mille Racing Team | LMP2 | Oreca 07 | Gibson GK428 4.2 L V8 | SEB; 12 | SPA; 8 | LMS; 6 | MNZ; 14 | FUJ; 8 | BHR; 8 | | | 12th | 30 |
| 2023 | Alpine Elf Team | LMP2 | Oreca 07 | Gibson GK428 4.2 L V8 | SEB; 8 | ALG; 8 | SPA; 7 | LMS; 3 | MNZ; 2 | FUJ; 5 | BHR; 7 | | 7th | 83 |
| 2024 | Alpine Endurance Team | Hypercar | Alpine A424 | Alpine V634 3.4 L Turbo V6 | QAT; 7 | IMO; 13 | SPA; 9 | LMS; Ret | SÃO; 12 | COA; 5 | FUJ; 7 | BHR; 9 | 17th | 30 |
| 2025 | Alpine Endurance Team | Hypercar | Alpine A424 | Alpine V634 3.4 L Turbo V6 | QAT; 14 | IMO; 13 | SPA; 8 | LMS; 8 | SÃO; 18 | COA; 11 | FUJ; 1 | BHR; 11 | 14th | 37 |
| 2026 | Alpine Endurance Team | Hypercar | Alpine A424 | Alpine V634 3.4 L Turbo V6 | IMO; 4 | SPA; 12 | LMS; 6 | SÃO; 10 | COA; 3 | FUJ; 4 | CAT; 10 | MNZ; Ret | 12th | 57 |

=== Complete 24 Hours of Le Mans results ===
| Year | Team | Co-Drivers | Car | Class | Laps | Pos. | Class Pos. |
|---|---|---|---|---|---|---|---|
| 2020 | (France) SO24-HAS By Graff | (France) Vincent Capillaire (Australia) James Allen | Oreca 07-Gibson | LMP2 | 357 | DNF | DNF |
| 2021 | (Belgium) Team WRT | (Netherlands) Robin Frijns (Austria) Ferdinand Habsburg | Oreca 07-Gibson | LMP2 | 363 | 6th | **1st** |
| 2022 | (France) Richard Mille Racing Team | (France) Sébastien Ogier (France) Lilou Wadoux | Oreca 07-Gibson | LMP2 | 366 | 13th | 9th |
| 2023 | (France) Alpine Elf Team | (France) Julien Canal (France) Matthieu Vaxivière | Oreca 07-Gibson | LMP2 | 327 | 12th | 4th |
| 2024 | (France) Alpine Endurance Team | (France) Paul-Loup Chatin (Austria) Ferdinand Habsburg | Alpine A424 | Hypercar | 75 | DNF | DNF |
| 2025 | (France) Alpine Endurance Team | (France) Paul-Loup Chatin (Austria) Ferdinand Habsburg | Alpine A424 | Hypercar | 385 | 9th | 9th |
| 2026 | (France) Alpine Endurance Team | (Portugal) António Félix da Costa (Austria) Ferdinand Habsburg | Alpine A424 | Hypercar | 381 | 6th | 6th |

=== Complete IMSA SportsCar Championship results ===
(key) (Races in bold indicate pole position; races in italics indicate fastest lap)

| Year | Entrant | Class | Make | Engine | 1 | 2 | 3 | 4 | 5 | 6 | 7 | Rank | Points |
|---|---|---|---|---|---|---|---|---|---|---|---|---|---|
| 2021 | Racing Team Nederland | LMP2 | Oreca 07 | Gibson GK428 4.2 L V8 | DAY; 8† | SEB | WGL | WGL | ELK | LGA | PET | NC† | 0† |
| 2024 | TDS Racing | LMP2 | Oreca 07 | Gibson GK428 4.2 L V8 | DAY; 13 | SEB | WGL | MOS | ELK | IMS | PET | 57th | 205 |
| 2025 | TDS Racing | LMP2 | Oreca 07 | Gibson GK428 4.2 L V8 | DAY; 8 | SEB | WGL | MOS | ELK | IMS | PET | 51st | 256 |
| 2026 | TDS Racing | LMP2 | Oreca 07 | Gibson GK428 4.2 L V8 | DAY; 12 | SEB; 7 | WGL | MOS | ELK | IMS | PET | 28th | 480 |

^{†} Points only counted towards the Michelin Endurance Cup, and not the overall LMP2 Championship.

=== Complete European Le Mans Series results ===
(Races in bold indicate pole position) (Races in italics indicate fastest lap)

| Year | Entrant | Class | Chassis | Engine | 1 | 2 | 3 | 4 | 5 | 6 | Rank | Points |
|---|---|---|---|---|---|---|---|---|---|---|---|---|
| 2020 | DragonSpeed USA | LMP2 | Oreca 07 | Gibson GK428 4.2 L V8 | LEC | SPA | LEC | MNZ; DSQ | ALG | | NC | 0 |
| 2021 | Cool Racing | LMP2 | Oreca 07 | Gibson GK428 4.2 L V8 | CAT | RBR | LEC | MNZ | **SPA**; 4 | **ALG**; 6 | 17th | 22 |
| 2024 | Panis VDS Racing | LMP2 | Oreca 07 | Gibson GK428 4.2 L V8 | CAT; 5 | LEC; 8 | **IMO**; 1 | SPA; 6 | MUG; 4 | **ALG**; 12 | 4th | 61 |
| 2025 | VDS Panis Racing | LMP2 | Oreca 07 | Gibson GK428 4.2 L V8 | CAT; 2 | LEC; 6 | IMO; 1 | SPA; 1 | **SIL**; 8 | ALG; 1 | 1st | 106 |
| 2026 | CLX Motorsport | LMP2 Pro-Am | Oreca 07 | Gibson GK428 4.2 L V8 | CAT; Ret | LEC; 9 | IMO; 6 | SPA; 11 | SIL; 5 | ALG; 2 | 9th | 38 |

=== Complete Asian Le Mans Series results ===
(Races in bold indicate pole position) (Races in italics indicate fastest lap)

| Year | Team | Car | Engine | Class | 1 | 2 | 3 | 4 | 5 | 6 | Pos. | Points |
|---|---|---|---|---|---|---|---|---|---|---|---|---|
| 2025–26 | Cetilar Racing | LMP2 | Oreca 07 | Gibson GK428 4.2 L V8 | SEP; 1; 1 | SEP; 2; 1 | DUB; 1; 2 | DUB; 2; 4 | ABU; 1; 11 | ABU; 2; 10 | 2nd | 81 |

Sporting positions
| Preceded by Filipe Albuquerque; Phil Hanson | FIA Endurance Trophy for LMP2 Drivers; 2021; With: Robin Frijns & Ferdinand Habsburg | Succeeded by António Félix da Costa; Roberto González; Will Stevens |
| Preceded by Louis Delétraz; Robert Kubica; Jonny Edgar | European Le Mans Series; LMP2 Champion; 2025; With: Oliver Gray & Esteban Masson | Succeeded by Incumbent |
