= Alpine A424 =

Sports prototype racing car

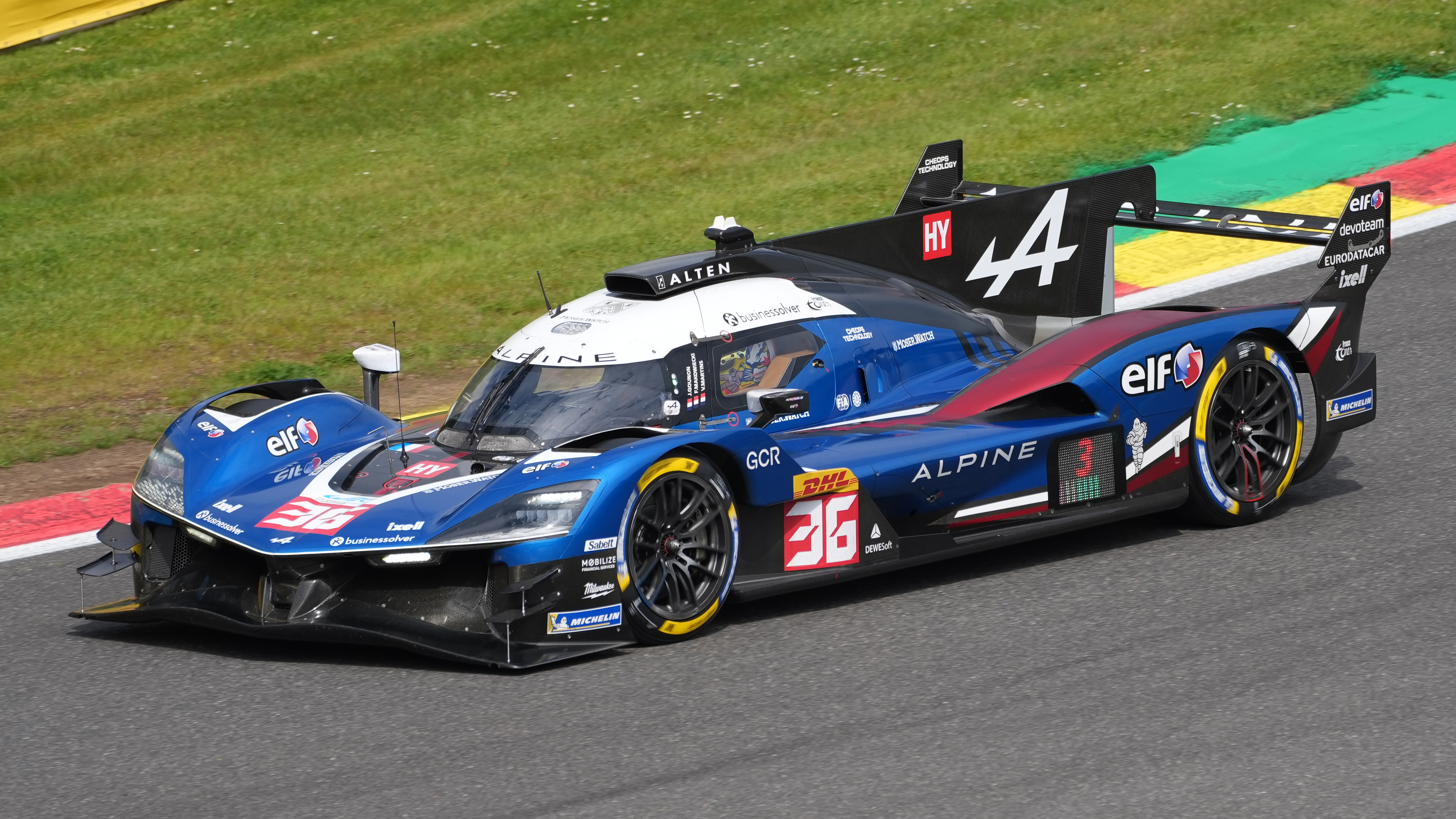
- The No. 36 A424 being driven by Jules Gounon at the 2026 6 Hours of Spa-Francorchamps
- Category: Le Mans Daytona h
- Constructor: Alpine (Oreca)
- Designers: Raphaël Linari (Chief Exterior Designer); Christophe Chapelain (Project Chief Engineer); Yann Paranthoën (LMDh Chief Engineer)
- Predecessor: Alpine A480; Renault Alpine A442

Technical specifications
- Chassis: Oreca 07-based carbon fibre monocoque with honeycomb shell
- Suspension (front): Double wishbones, pushrods with power steering
- Suspension (rear): Double wishbones, pushrods
- Length: 5,000 mm (196.9 in)
- Width: 1,998 mm (78.7 in)
- Height: 1,058 mm (41.7 in)
- Wheelbase: 3,148 mm (123.9 in)
- Engine: Alpine V634 3.4 L (207 cu in) 90° V6 turbocharged mid-engine, longitudinally-mounted
- Electric motor: Rear-mounted 50 kW (68 PS; 67 hp) spec MGU supplied by Bosch
- Transmission: Xtrac P1359 7-speed sequential manual
- Power: 500 kW (680 PS; 671 hp)
- Weight: 1,030 kg (2,271 lb)
- Fuel: TotalEnergies
- Lubricants: Elf
- Brakes: AP Racing carbon with AP Racing Monobloc 6-piston calipers
- Tyres: Michelin slicks with OZ one-piece forged alloys, 29/71-18 front and 34/71-18 rear

Competition history
- Competition: FIA World Endurance Championship
- Notable entrants: (France) Alpine Endurance Team
- Notable drivers: (France) Paul-Loup Chatin; (Austria) Ferdinand Habsburg; (France) Nicolas Lapierre; (France) Charles Milesi; (Germany) Mick Schumacher; (France) Matthieu Vaxivière; (Andorra) Jules Gounon; (France) Frédéric Makowiecki
- Debut: 2024 Qatar 1812 km
- First win: 2025 6 Hours of Fuji
- Last event: 2026 6 Hours of Monza
Races	Wins	Podiums	Poles	F/Laps
24	1	7	1	0
- Teams' Championships: 0
- Constructors' Championships: 0
- Drivers' Championships: 0

The Alpine A424 is an LMDh sports prototype racing car designed by Automobiles Alpine and built by Oreca to compete in the Le Mans Hypercar class in the FIA World Endurance Championship.

== Background ==
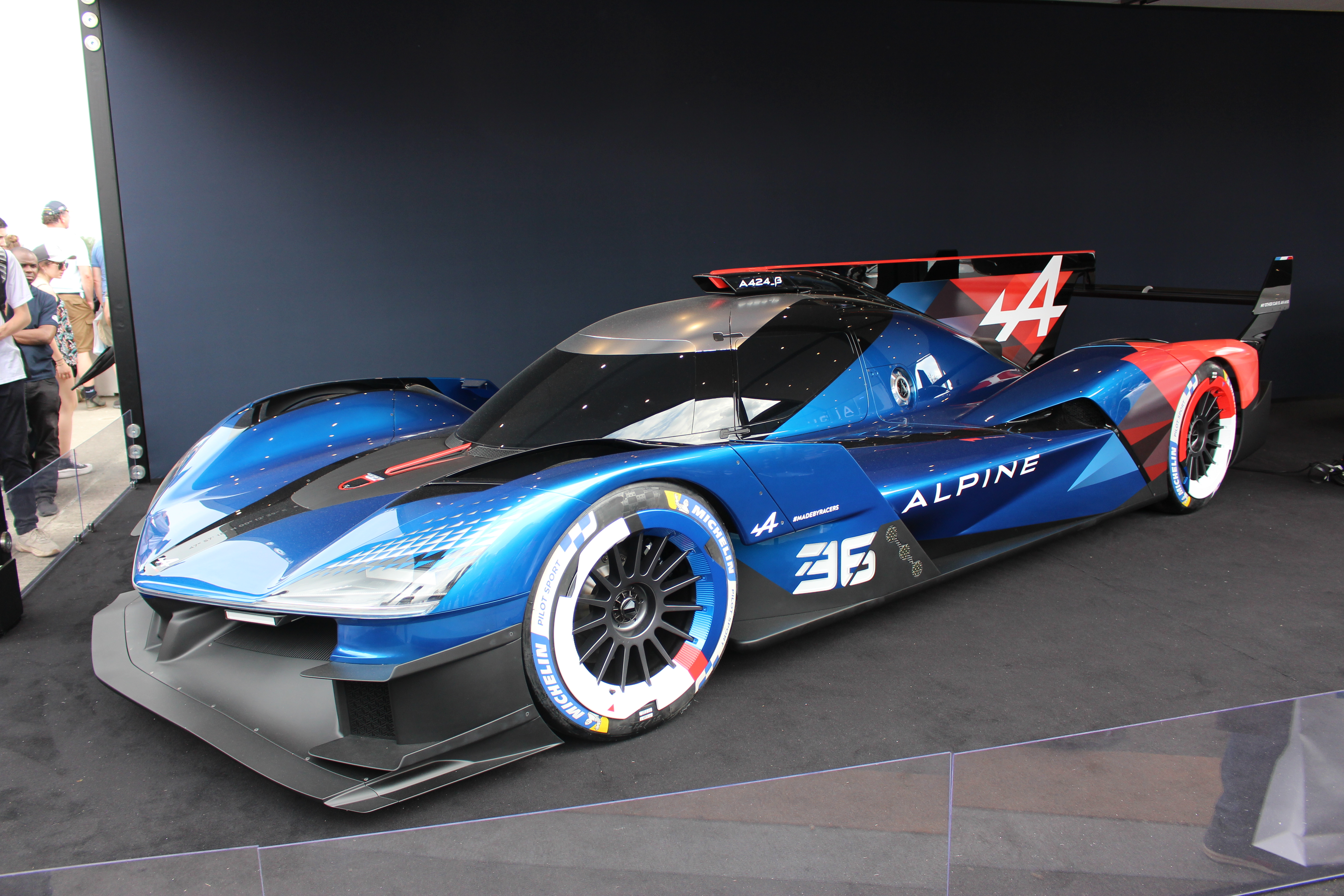
A424_β show car on display at the 2023 24 Hours of Le Mans

On 5 October 2021, Alpine formally announced an entry into the FIA World Endurance Championship starting from the 2024 season, using an LMDh-compliant racing design. It was also confirmed on the same day that Oreca was chosen as the chassis supplier for their LMDh contender.

Alpine unveiled a prototype show car, named the A424_β (pronounced "A424 Beta"), on 9 June 2023, at the 2023 24 Hours of Le Mans. It was also announced that the car would use a hybrid powertrain, consisting of a Mecachrome-based V6 single turbocharged internal combustion engine and standardized hybrid drivetrain components provided by Williams Advanced Engineering, Bosch and Xtrac, and that Signatech would run two cars.

The car is built on the "next generation" Oreca LMP2 chassis. The A424's engine is said to be a "heavily modified" version of the Mecachrome V634 engine used in the FIA Formula 2 Championship; Alpine confirmed that the car's engine was unrelated to the engine briefly used in the Ginetta G60-LT-P1 LMP1 car in 2018. Dyno tests for the engine were completed on 28 June. The car was first fired up on July 5. The program first completed 2 shakedown tests at Lurcy-Lévis at the end of August. The test programme then continued running at Circuit Paul Ricard, Motorland Aragón, Jerez and Portimão.

Alpine unveiled their driver lineup for 2024 on 22 November 2023.

== Racing history ==
The car debuted at the opening round of the 2024 FIA World Endurance Championship in Qatar, one of four new manufacturers joining the championship (the others being BMW, (Note: BMW had already raced for one year in the IMSA SportsCar Championship prior to joining the WEC.) Lamborghini, and Isotta Fraschini). Two A424s were entered: the #35, driven by Paul-Loup Chatin, Ferdinand Habsburg, and Charles Milesi; and the #36, driven by Nicolas Lapierre, Mick Schumacher and Matthieu Vaxivière.

The A424 placed best of the newcomers, with the #35 car finishing 7th, the only points-scoring finish of the new manufacturers. After Habsburg was injured in a crash during testing, reserve driver Jules Gounon stood in for the next two rounds at Imola and Spa-Francorchamps.

At the 2024 24 Hours of Le Mans, both Alpine A424s suffered catastrophic turbo failures within the first six hours of the race, which forced them to retire, despite showing good pace. Work on engine upgrades began immediately after, and were in place for the Lone Star Le Mans, where the #35 car finished 5th, Alpine's best result yet. At the 6 Hours of Fuji, Alpine scored their first podium finish, where the #36 placed third. Another good result at the final race of the season — fourth for the #35 at the 8 Hours of Bahrain — meant that the team finished fourth in the constructor's standings.

The No. 35 car at the 2024 24 Hours of Le Mans.

Ahead of the 2025 WEC season, further updates to the car's engine were carried out, and the driver line-ups for both cars were tweaked: Vaxivière and Lapierre were replaced with Frédéric Makowiecki, a former Porsche Hypercar driver, and Gounon, who was promoted from reserve to full-season driver. Alpine secured a first victory for the A424 at the 2025 6 Hours of Fuji. The team secured the lead of the race by only taking two tires at the final pit stop, leapfrogging Peugeot and Porsche. The win was Alpine's first in the series since the 2022 6 Hours of Monza.

A rained out qualifying session during the 2026 6 Hours of Fuji, which saw the starting grid sorted by the fastest times set during free practice, allowed Alpine to start the race in the front row, subsequently securing a maiden pole position for the A424. After running the majority of the race in the lead, Alpine ultimately settled for 2nd and 4th after a late safety car period saw Toyota take the lead at the restart.

== Racing results ==
=== Complete FIA World Endurance Championship results ===
(key) Races in bold indicates pole position. Races in italics indicates fastest lap.

Year	Entrants	Class	Drivers	No.	1	2	3	4	5	6	7	8	Points	Pos
2024	Alpine Endurance Team	Hypercar			QAT	IMO	SPA	LMN	SAP	COA	FUJ	BHR	70	4th
2024	Alpine Endurance Team	Hypercar	(France) Paul-Loup Chatin	35	7	13	9	Ret	12	5		4	70	4th
2024	Alpine Endurance Team	Hypercar	(Austria) Ferdinand Habsburg	35	7			Ret	12	5	7	4	70	4th
2024	Alpine Endurance Team	Hypercar	(France) Jules Gounon	35		13	9				7	4	70	4th
2024	Alpine Endurance Team	Hypercar	(France) Charles Milesi	35	7	13	9	Ret	12	5	7		70	4th
2024	Alpine Endurance Team	Hypercar	(France) Charles Milesi	36								9	70	4th
2024	Alpine Endurance Team	Hypercar	(France) Nicolas Lapierre	36	11	16	12	Ret	10	9	3		70	4th
2024	Alpine Endurance Team	Hypercar	(Germany) Mick Schumacher	36	11	16	12	Ret	10	9	3	9	70	4th
2024	Alpine Endurance Team	Hypercar	(France) Matthieu Vaxivière	36	11	16	12	Ret	10	9	3	9	70	4th
2025	Alpine Endurance Team	Hypercar			QAT	IMO	SPA	LMN	SAO	COA	FUJ	BHR	86	6th
2025	Alpine Endurance Team	Hypercar	(France) Paul-Loup Chatin	35	14	13	8	10	18	11	1	11	86	6th
2025	Alpine Endurance Team	Hypercar	(Austria) Ferdinand Habsburg	35	14	13	8	10	18	11	1	11	86	6th
2025	Alpine Endurance Team	Hypercar	(France) Charles Milesi	35	14	13	8	10	18	11	1	11	86	6th
2025	Alpine Endurance Team	Hypercar	(France) Jules Gounon	36	13	3	3	11	9	15	14	12	86	6th
2025	Alpine Endurance Team	Hypercar	(France) Frédéric Makowiecki	36	13	3	3	11	9	15	14	12	86	6th
2025	Alpine Endurance Team	Hypercar	(Germany) Mick Schumacher	36	13	3	3	11	9	15	14	12	86	6th
2026	Alpine Endurance Team	Hypercar			IMO	SPA	LMN	SÃO	COA	FUJ	CAT	MNZ	122	5th
2026	Alpine Endurance Team	Hypercar	(Portugal) António Félix da Costa	35	4	12	6	10	3				122	5th
2026	Alpine Endurance Team	Hypercar	(Austria) Ferdinand Habsburg	35	4	12	6	10	3	4	10	Ret	122	5th
2026	Alpine Endurance Team	Hypercar	(France) Charles Milesi	35	4	12	6	10	3	4	10	Ret	122	5th
2026	Alpine Endurance Team	Hypercar	(France) Jules Gounon	36	11	11	10	11	5	**2**	8	2	122	5th
2026	Alpine Endurance Team	Hypercar	(France) Frédéric Makowiecki	36	11	11	10	11	5				122	5th
2026	Alpine Endurance Team	Hypercar	(France) Victor Martins	36	11	11	10	11	5	**2**	8	2	122	5th
