= Toyota H8909 engine =

Toyota RHV Ph8.97 H8909 engine

Overview
- Manufacturer: Toyota Gazoo Racing
- Designer: Hisatake Murata
- Production: 2016-present

Layout
- Configuration: 90° V6
- Displacement: 2.4 L (2,396 cc) (2016-2020); 3.5 L (3,456 cc) (2021-present)
- Cylinder bore: 83 mm (3.3 in) (2.4 L); 94 mm (3.7 in) (3.5 L)
- Piston stroke: 73.8 mm (2.91 in) (2.4 L); 83 mm (3.27 in) (3.5 L)
- Cylinder block material: Die-cast aluminium alloy
- Cylinder head material: Aluminium alloy
- Valvetrain: 24-valve (four-valves per cylinder), DOHC

RPM range
- Max. engine speed: Over 8,000 (TS050) later 7,800 (GR010)

Combustion
- Turbocharger: Twin-turbocharged at 2.5 bar (36.26 psi)
- Fuel system: Gasoline direct injection
- Management: Denso ECU
- Fuel type: Shell V-Power petrol (2016-2017); Total Excellium E20 or biofuel (2018-present)
- Oil system: Dry sump
- Cooling system: Intercooled

Output
- Power output: 1,000 PS (986 hp; 735 kW) (2016-2020); 952 PS (939 hp; 700 kW) (2021-2022); 979 PS (966 hp; 720 kW) (2023-present)
- Torque output: 504 N⋅m (372 ft⋅lb)

Dimensions
- Length: 460 mm (18 in)
- Dry weight: Approximately 120 kg (265 lb)

Chronology
- Predecessor: Toyota RV8 engine

The Toyota RHV Ph8.97 H8909 engine family is a series of twin-turbocharged, four-stroke, 2.4-liter and 3.5-liter, V6 racing engines, made by Toyota Gazoo Racing for use in their TS050, GR010, and TR010 Hybrid Le Mans Prototype race cars, since 2016. The H8909 engine is currently developed at Toyota Gazoo Racing's engine plant in Susono, Japan and assembled and prepared at Toyota Gazoo Racing's European division in Cologne, Germany and initially designed by former Toyota Gazoo Racing LMP1 powertrain director Hisatake Murata.

== TS050 engine ==
The TS050 Hybrid uses a 2.4-liter twin-turbocharged petrol V6, and features an 8-megajoule hybrid system, which uses lithium-ion batteries. The capacitor hybrid energy storage system was replaced with a new lithium-ion battery system, with the car moving to the 8-megajoule LMP1 Hybrid sub-class. The ICE makes 368 kW (493 hp; 500 PS), and is complemented by electric motors, giving an additional 368 kW (493 hp; 500 PS).

== GR010 engine ==
The GR010 Hybrid's engine is an enlarged 3.5-liter twin-turbocharged petrol V6, with a hybrid system, which also uses lithium-ion batteries. The ICE makes 500 kW (671 hp), plus another 200 kW (268 hp) from the electric motors.

== Applications ==
- Toyota TS050 Hybrid
- Toyota GR010 Hybrid
- Toyota TR010 Hybrid
