= Sarah Bovy =

Belgian racing driver

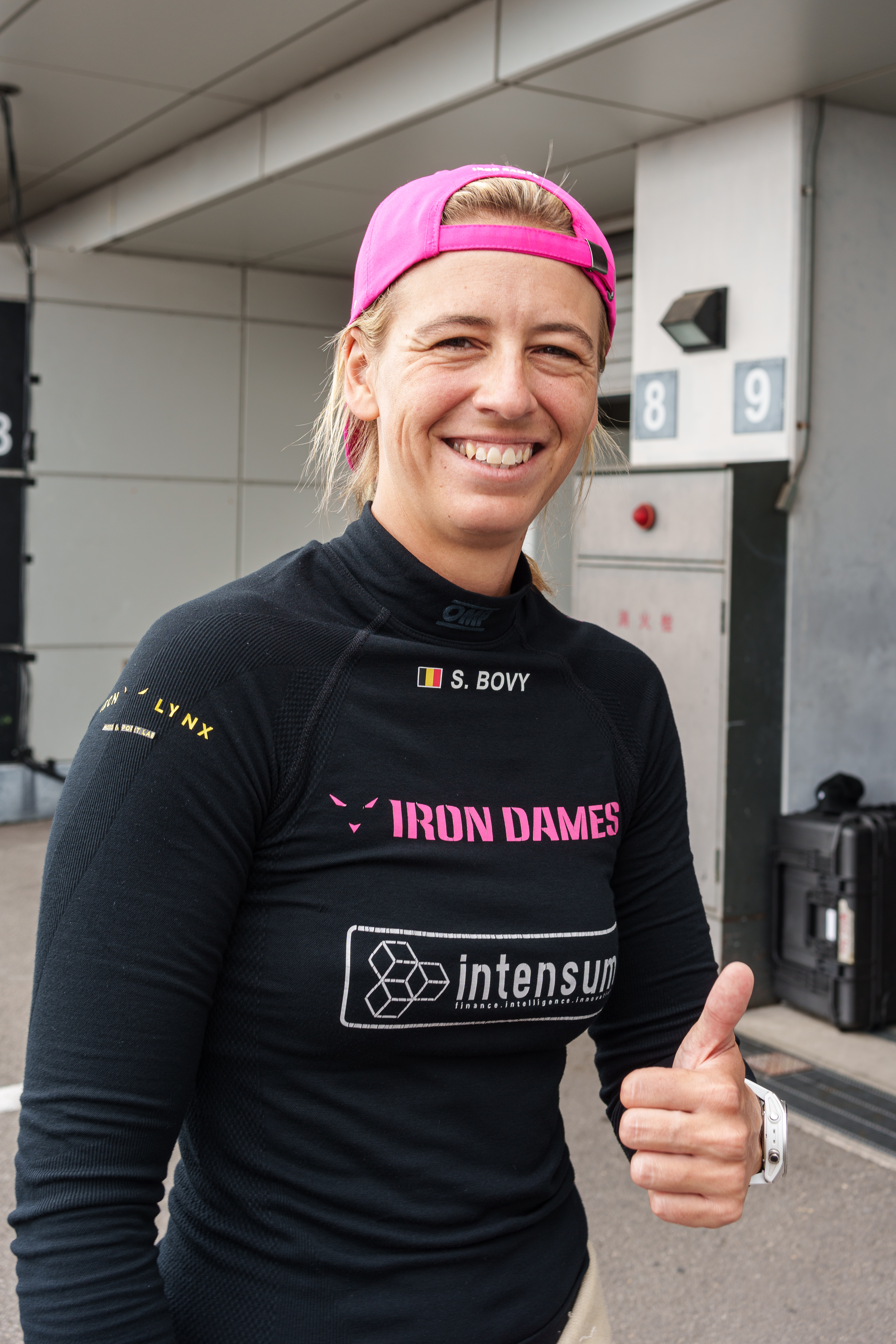
- Bovy at the 2024 6 Hours of Fuji
- Nationality: (Belgium) Belgian
- Born: 15 May 1989 (age 37) Liège, Belgium

FIA World Endurance Championship career
- Debut season: 2021
- Current team: Iron Dames
- Categorisation: FIA Silver (2012–2020, 2025–); FIA Bronze (2021–2024)
- Car number: 85
- Starts: 25
- Wins: 1
- Poles: 7
- Fastest laps: 1
- Best finish: 2nd in 2023

Previous series
- 2005 2012-2013, 2017 2015 2019: Formula Renault Belgium; Blancpain Endurance Cup; Renault Sport Trophy; W Series
24 Hours of Le Mans career
- Years: 2021–2025
- Teams: Iron Dames (2021–2025)
- Best finish: 4th (2023)
- Class wins: 0

Sarah Bovy (born 15 May 1989 in Liège) is a racing driver from Belgium. She recently competed with the Iron Dames team in multiple series, including the FIA World Endurance Championship and at the 24 Hours of Le Mans.

== Biography ==
Following two years in karting, Bovy began her racing career as a Formula Renault Academy driver in Formula Renault 1.6 Belgium. Former Formula One driver Thierry Boutsen took her under his wing as part of his team, and began an association with the Boutsen-Ginion squad that saw her race in GT, touring car and silhouette racing disciplines before taking a year's break in 2014 due to a lack of funding and undertook a Bachelor of Marketing course.

Bovy returned to the sport in 2015, gaining the funding to complete a full season in the Renault Sport Trophy. She yielded a podium in her home race at Spa-Francorchamps before falling back into a part-time endurance campaign in 2016. The next two seasons would see her align with Lamborghini, contesting the 2017 Super Trofeo Europe Championship – finishing 14th in the Pro-Am class – and various endurance races in 2018, finishing second in class at the 2018 24 Hours of Spa.

In 2019, Bovy applied for entry into the women's only Formula Regional championship W Series. She was accepted as one of the series' reserve drivers, and would be called upon on three occasions – the first time in her home race at Zolder where she failed to start with technical issues; again in Misano following injury for regular driver Emma Kimiläinen, finishing 12th; and also in the final round of the championship at Brands Hatch, ending the race 19th after sustaining front-wing damage in the early laps. She scored no points and was the penultimate driver in the standings.

On 25 March 2026, the ACO named Bovy Grand Marshal of the 2026 24 Hours of Le Mans.

=== Iron Dames ===
In 2021, Bovy joined the Iron Dames to compete in the opening rounds of the Michelin Le Mans Cup alongside Doriane Pin. The same year, she would also drive in two rounds of the GT World Challenge Europe Endurance Cup, before being introduced into the team's WEC roster for the final four rounds of the campaign, replacing Manuela Gostner.

The following year saw Bovy team up with Rahel Frey and Michelle Gatting to contest a full season in the LMGTE Am class of the World Endurance Championship, as well as racing in the European Le Mans Series and GTWC Europe Endurance Cup. During the WEC campaign, Bovy became the first woman to claim a pole position in the series' history, qualifying first at both Monza and Bahrain. Additionally, podiums in the final three races of the season helped the No. 85 Dames crew to finish third in the teams' championship. Adding to Bovy's successful year, the Dames would win the Gold Cup at the 24 Hours of Spa as well as finishing third overall in the ELMS, as a Bovy pole position was converted to victory at the Algarve.

Bovy returned to the Iron Dames roster for another WEC season in 2023, this time switching from the Ferrari 488 GTE Evo to a Porsche 911 RSR-19. The season opener at Sebring began strongly, with Bovy taking pole position, though an off by Frey which damaged the car's diffuser and floor would curtail any hopes of a maiden victory. Despite not scoring pole in Portugal, a clean race enabled the No. 85 team to take their first podium of the year, finishing third. Further top five finishes followed at Spa and Le Mans, where Bovy and her teammates narrowly missed out on a podium due to a slow final stop. Bovy scored her second pole of the year in Monza and led the race during the opening stint, before the team fell back to fifth by the checkered flag.

== Racing record ==
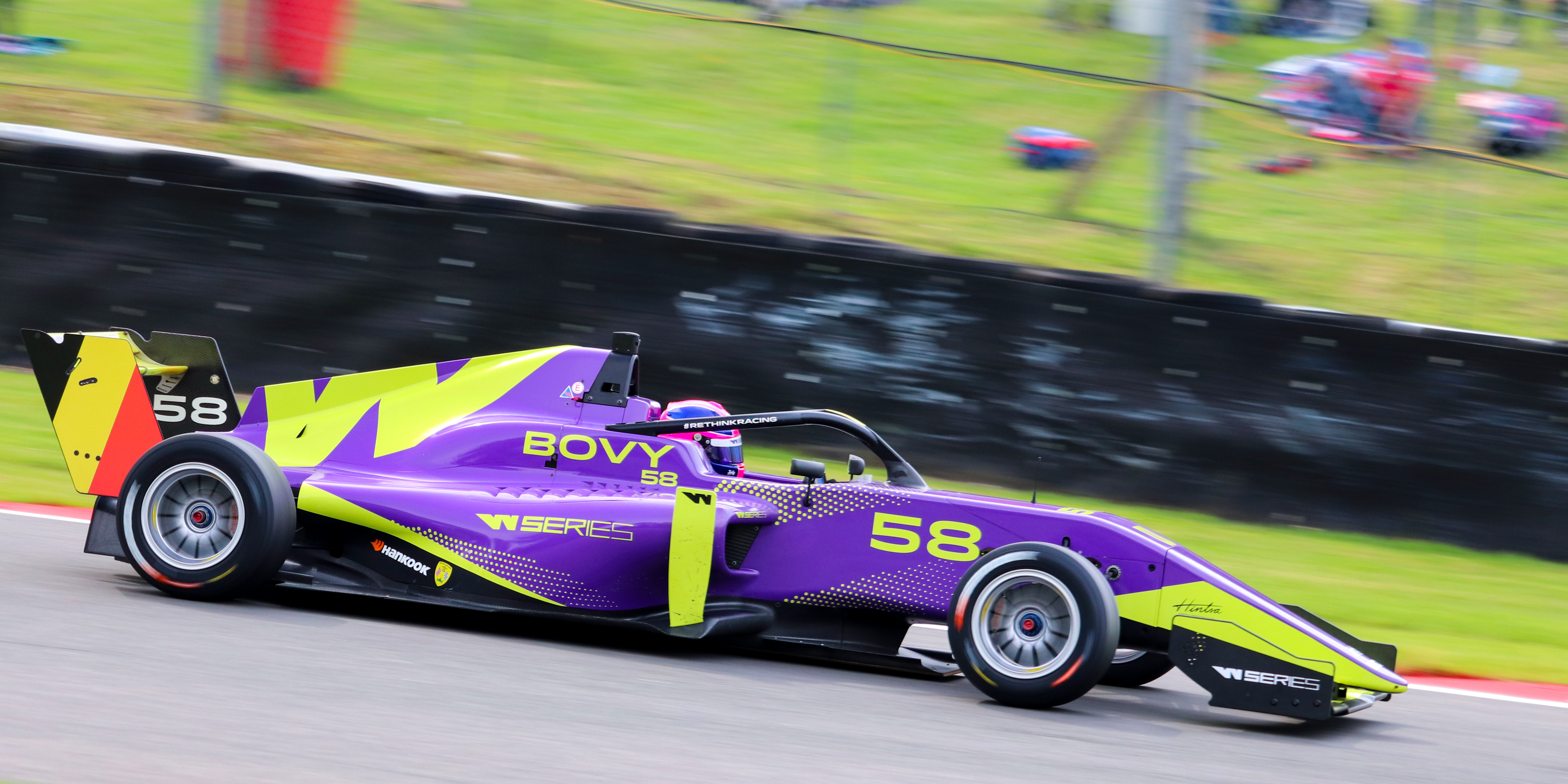
Bovy competing in the 2019 W Series Brands Hatch round.

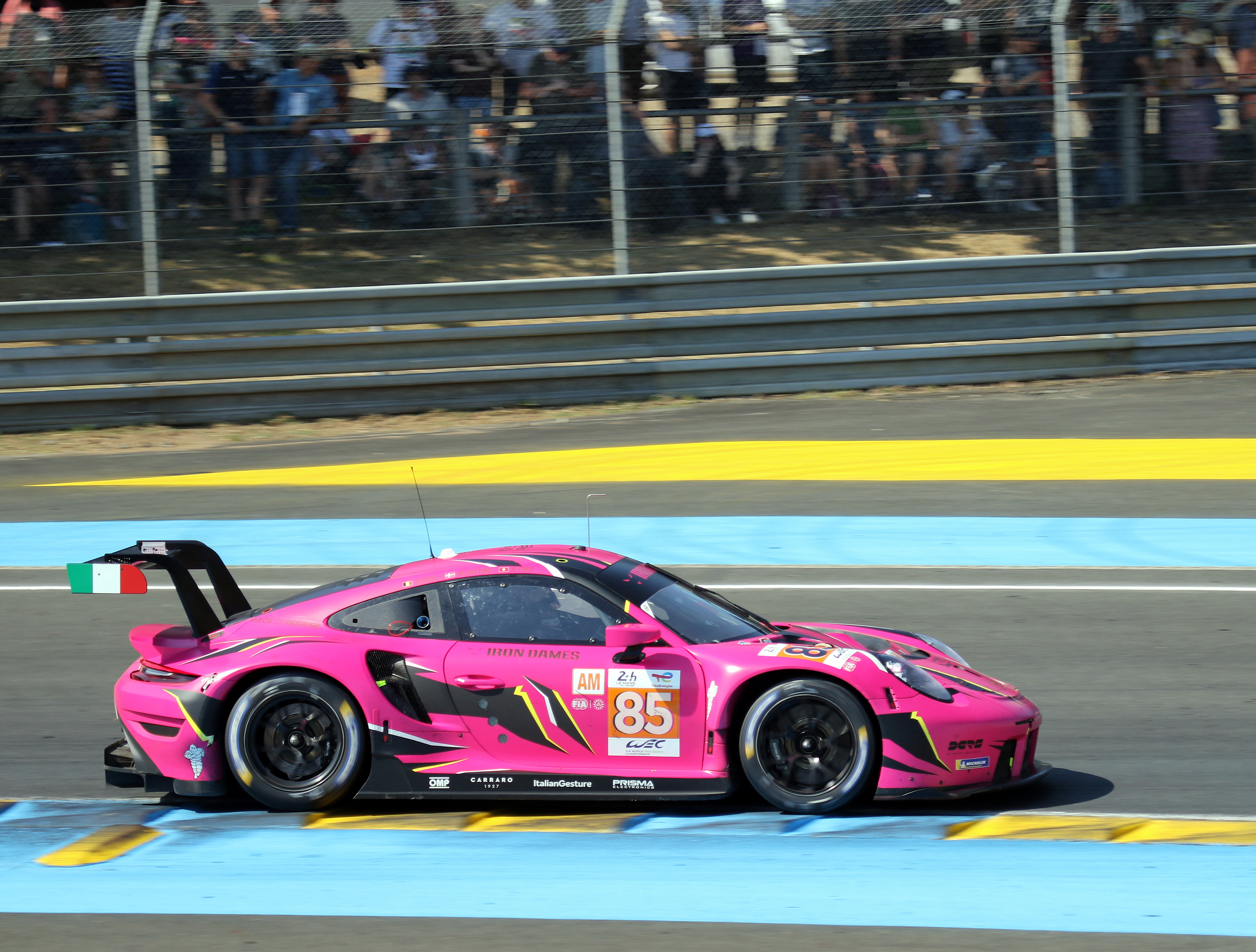
Bovy competing in the 2023 24 Hours of Le Mans.

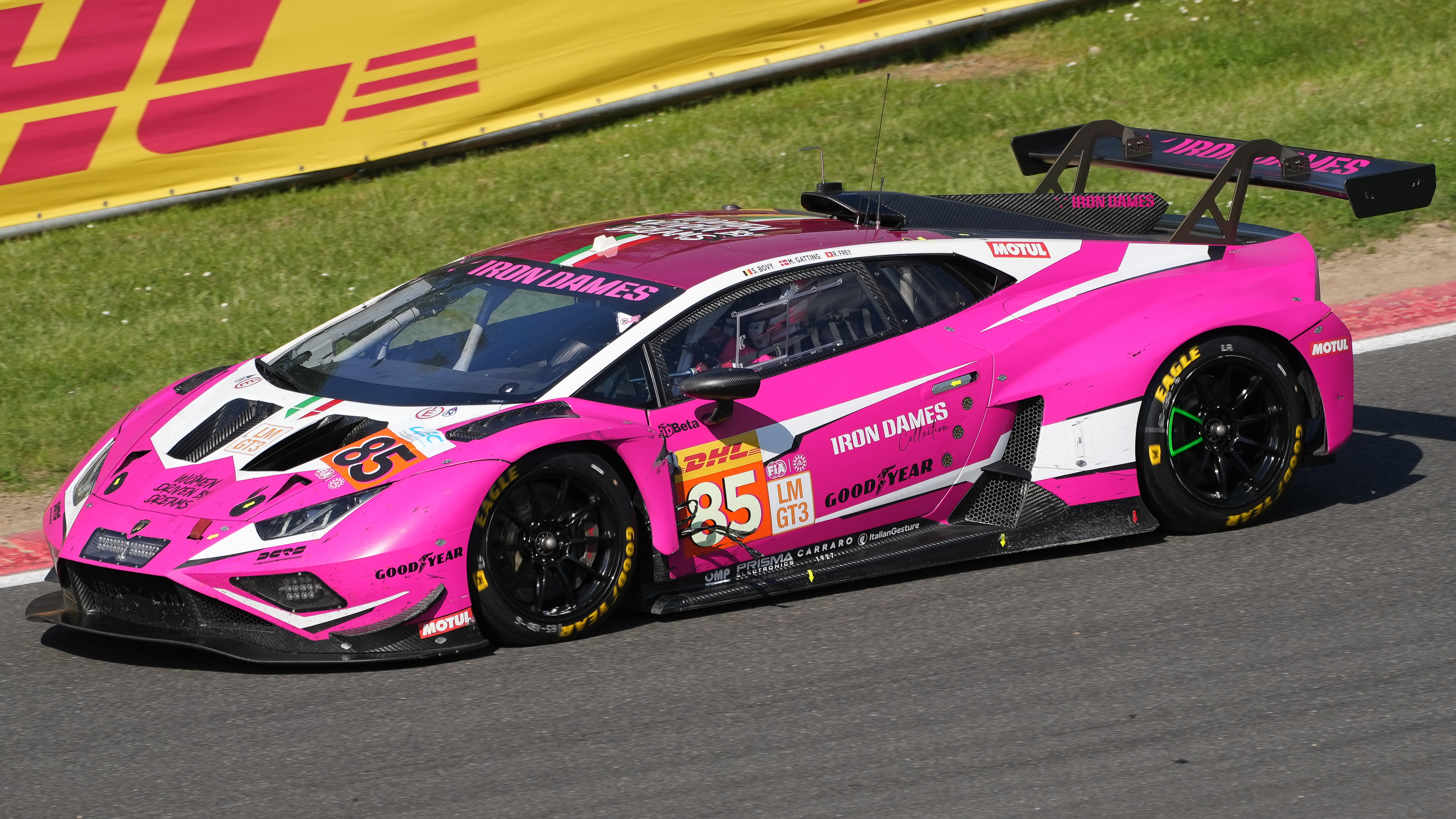
Bovy competing in the 2024 6 Hours of Spa-Francorchamps.

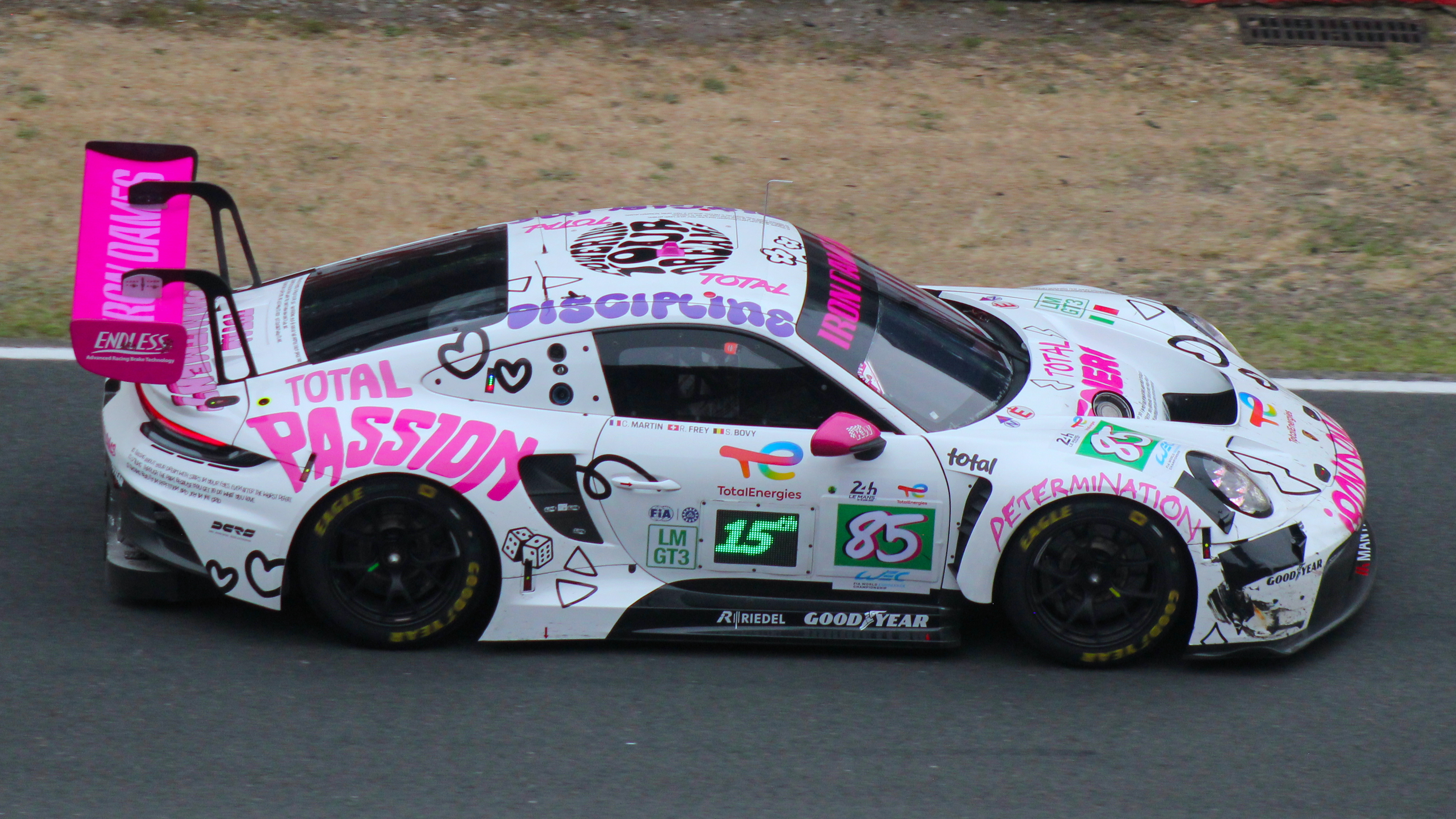
Bovy competing in the 2025 24 Hours of Le Mans.

=== Racing career summary ===
Season	Series	Team	Races	Wins	Poles	F/Laps	Podiums	Points	Position
2005	Formula Renault 1.6 Belgium	Thierry Boutsen Racing	?	?	?	?	?	0	NC
2010	Belgian Touring Car Series - T3	DTC Team	2	0	0	0	1	28	18th
2012	Blancpain Endurance Series - Pro-Am	Boutsen Ginion Racing	1	0	0	0	0	0	NC
2013	Blancpain Endurance Series - Pro-Am	GPR AMR	1	0	0	0	0	0	NC
2015	Renault Sport Trophy - Prestige	Monlau Competición	2	0	0	1	1	19	11th
2015	24H Series - A3T	Team Altran							
2016	Lamborghini Super Trofeo Europe - Pro-Am	Leipert Motorsport	10	0	0	0	0	16	14th
2016	Touring Car Endurance Series - A3	Team Altran Peugeot							
2016	24H Series - A3	Team Altran Peugeot							
2017	Blancpain GT Series Endurance Cup	Attempto Racing	1	0	0	0	0	0	NC
2017	Intercontinental GT Challenge	Attempto Racing	1	0	0	0	0	0	NC
2018–19	Asian Le Mans Series - LMP3	N24	1	0	0	0	0	6	12th
2019	W Series	Hitech GP	2	0	0	0	0	0	19th
2021	Le Mans Cup - GT3	Iron Lynx	2	0	0	0	2	36	10th
2021	European Le Mans Series - LMGTE	Iron Lynx	2	0	0	0	2	30	14th
2021	FIA World Endurance Championship - LMGTE Am	Iron Lynx	4	0	0	0	0	30	14th
2021	GT World Challenge Europe Endurance Cup	Iron Lynx	2	0	0	0	0	17	23rd
2022	FIA World Endurance Championship - LMGTE Am	Iron Dames	5	0	2	0	3	92	5th
2022	GT World Challenge Europe Endurance Cup	Iron Dames	5	0	0	0	0	0	NC
2022	Intercontinental GT Challenge	Iron Dames	1	0	0	0	0	0	*
2022	24 Hours of Le Mans - LMGTE Am	Iron Dames	1	0	0	0	0	N/A	7th
2022	European Le Mans Series - LMGTE	Iron Lynx	6	1	1	1	2	70	**3rd**
2023	FIA World Endurance Championship - LMGTE Am	Iron Dames	7	1	3	0	2	118	**2nd**
2023	IMSA SportsCar Championship - GTD	Iron Dames	2	0	0	0	0	368	45th
2023	GT World Challenge Europe Endurance Cup	Iron Dames	5	0	0	0	0	0	NC
2023	GT World Challenge Europe Endurance Cup - Bronze Cup	Iron Dames	5	0	1	0	0	10	24th
2023	24 Hours of Le Mans - LMGTE Am	Iron Dames	1	0	0	0	0	N/A	4th
2024	FIA World Endurance Championship - LMGT3	Iron Dames	8	0	2	1	0	54	8th
2024	IMSA SportsCar Championship - GTD	Iron Dames	5	0	0	0	0	918	39th
2024	European Le Mans Series - LMGT3	Iron Dames	6	1	4	0	2	65	4th
2024–25	Asian Le Mans Series - GT	Iron Dames	6	0	0	0	0	15	16th
2025	European Le Mans Series - LMGT3	Iron Dames	6	1	1	0	2	62	4th
2025	IMSA SportsCar Championship - GTD	Iron Dames	2	0	0	0	0	471	46th
2025	FIA World Endurance Championship - LMGT3	Iron Dames	1	0	0	0	0	2	24th
2026	GT World Challenge Europe Endurance Cup	Comtoyou Racing							
2026	GT2 European Series - Pro-Am	Iron Dames by SP Racing							

=== Complete GT World Challenge Europe results ===
==== GT World Challenge Europe Endurance Cup ====
(key) (Races in bold indicate pole position; races in italics indicate fastest lap)

Year	Team	Car	Class	1	2	3	4	5	6	7	8	Pos.	Points
2012	Boutsen Ginion Racing	McLaren MP4-12C GT3	Pro-Am	MNZ	SIL	LEC	SPA; 6H; 48	SPA; 12H; Ret	SPA; 24H; Ret	NÜR	NAV	NC	0
2013	GPR AMR	Aston Martin V12 Vantage GT3	Pro-Am	MNZ	SIL	LEC	SPA; 6H; 47	SPA; 12H; Ret	SPA; 24H; Ret	NÜR		NC	0
2017	Attempto Racing	Lamborghini Huracán GT3	Am	MNZ	SIL	LEC	SPA; 6H; 45	SPA; 12H; 35	SPA; 24H; 31	CAT		18th	16
2021	Iron Lynx	Ferrari 488 GT3 Evo 2020	Pro-Am	MNZ	LEC; 30	SPA; 6H	SPA; 12H	SPA; 24H	NÜR	CAT; 33		23rd	17
2022	Iron Dames	Ferrari 488 GT3 Evo 2020	Gold	IMO; Ret	LEC; 17	SPA; 6H; 28	SPA; 12H; 21	SPA; 24H; 18	HOC; 22	**CAT**; 43		2nd	77
2023	Iron Dames	Lamborghini Huracán GT3 Evo 2	Bronze	MNZ; 28	LEC; 29	SPA; 6H; 42	SPA; 12H; Ret	SPA; 24H; Ret	**NÜR**; 37	CAT; 34		24th	10
2026	Comtoyou Racing	Aston Martin Vantage AMR GT3 Evo	Pro-Am	LEC	MNZ	SPA; 6H; 43	SPA; 12H; 43	SPA; 24H; Ret	NÜR	ALG		NC	0

=== Complete W Series results ===
(key) (Races in bold indicate pole position) (Races in italics indicate fastest lap)

Year	Team	1	2	3	4	5	6	DC	Points
2019	Hitech GP	HOC; PO	ZOL; DNS	MIS; 12	NRM; PO	ASN; PO	BRH; 19	19th	0

=== Complete 24 Hours of Le Mans results ===
Year	Team	Co-Drivers	Car	Class	Laps	Pos.	Class Pos.
2021	(Italy) Iron Lynx	(Switzerland) Rahel Frey (Denmark) Michelle Gatting	Ferrari 488 GTE Evo	GTE; Am	332	36th	9th
2022	(Italy) Iron Dames	(Switzerland) Rahel Frey (Denmark) Michelle Gatting	Ferrari 488 GTE Evo	GTE; Am	339	40th	7th
2023	(Italy) Iron Dames	(Switzerland) Rahel Frey (Denmark) Michelle Gatting	Porsche 911 RSR-19	GTE; Am	312	30th	4th
2024	(Italy) Iron Dames	(Switzerland) Rahel Frey (Denmark) Michelle Gatting	Lamborghini Huracán GT3 Evo 2	LMGT3	279	32nd	5th
2025	(Italy) Iron Dames	(Switzerland) Rahel Frey (France) Célia Martin	Porsche 911 GT3 R (992)	LMGT3	334	48th	16th

=== Complete European Le Mans Series results ===
(key) (Races in bold indicate pole position; results in italics indicate fastest lap)

Year	Entrant	Class	Chassis	Engine	1	2	3	4	5	6	Rank	Points
2021	Iron Lynx	LMGTE	Ferrari 488 GTE Evo	Ferrari F154CB 3.9 L Turbo V8	CAT	RBR	LEC	MNZ	SPA; 3	ALG; 3	14th	30
2022	Iron Lynx	LMGTE	Ferrari 488 GTE Evo	Ferrari F154CB 3.9 L Turbo V8	LEC; 4	IMO; 8	MNZ; 5	CAT; Ret	SPA; 2	**ALG**; 1	3rd	70
2024	Iron Dames	LMGT3	Porsche 911 GT3 R (992)	Porsche M97/80 4.2 L Flat-6	**CAT**; Ret	**LEC**; 4	**IMO**; 1	SPA; Ret	MUG; 7	**ALG**; 2	4th	65
2025	Iron Dames	LMGT3	Porsche 911 GT3 R (992)	Porsche M97/80 4.2 L Flat-6	CAT; 1	LEC; 7	IMO; 9	SPA; 4	**SIL**; 10	ALG; 3	4th	62

=== Complete FIA World Endurance Championship results ===
(key) (Races in bold indicate pole position) (Races in italics indicate fastest lap)

Year	Entrant	Class	Car	Engine	1	2	3	4	5	6	7	8	Rank	Points
2021	Iron Lynx	LMGTE Am	Ferrari 488 GTE Evo	Ferrari F154CB 3.9 L Turbo V8	SPA	ALG	MNZ; 8	LMS; 6	FUJ; 8	BHR; 8			14th	30
2022	Iron Dames	LMGTE Am	Ferrari 488 GTE Evo	Ferrari F154CB 3.9 L Turbo V8	SEB; 5	SPA	LMS; 6	**MNZ**; 2	FUJ; 2	**BHR**; 3			5th	92
2023	Iron Dames	LMGTE Am	Porsche 911 RSR-19	Porsche 4.2 L Flat-6	**SEB**; 8	ALG; 3	SPA; 5	LMS; 4	**MNZ**; 5	FUJ; 4	**BHR**; 1		2nd	118
2024	Iron Dames	LMGT3	Lamborghini Huracán GT3 Evo 2	Lamborghini DGF 5.2 L V10	QAT; 8	IMO; NC	**SPA**; 5	LMS; 4	**SÃO**; Ret	COA; 13	FUJ; 5	BHR; 10	8th	54
2025	Iron Dames	LMGT3	Porsche 911 GT3 R (992)	Porsche 4.2 L Flat-6	QAT	IMO	SPA	LMS; 10	SÃO	COA	FUJ	BHR	24th	2

=== Complete IMSA SportsCar Championship results ===
(key) (Races in bold indicate pole position; races in italics indicate fastest lap)

Year	Entrant	Class	Make	Engine	1	2	3	4	5	6	7	8	9	10	11	Rank	Points
2023	Iron Dames	GTD	Lamborghini Huracán GT3 Evo 2	Lamborghini 5.2 L V10	DAY; 18	SEB; 11	LBH	LGA	WGL	MOS	LIM	ELK	VIR	IMS	PET	45th	368
2024	Iron Dames	GTD	Lamborghini Huracán GT3 Evo 2	Lamborghini 5.2 L V10	DAY; 6	SEB; 20	LBH	LGA	WGL; 15	MOS	ELK	VIR	IMS; 18	PET; 13		39th	918
2025	Iron Dames	GTD	Porsche 911 GT3 R (992)	Porsche M97/80 4.2 L Flat-6	DAY; 8	SEB; 11	LBH	LGA	WGL	MOS	ELK	VIR	IMS	PET		46th	471

=== Complete 24 Hours of Daytona results ===
Year	Team	Co-Drivers	Car	Class	Laps	Ovr. Pos.	Cla. Pos.
2023	(Italy) Iron Dames	(Switzerland) Rahel Frey (Denmark) Michelle Gatting (France) Doriane Pin	Lamborghini Huracán GT3 Evo2	GTD	659	46th	18th
2024	(Italy) Iron Dames	(Switzerland) Rahel Frey (Denmark) Michelle Gatting (France) Doriane Pin	Lamborghini Huracán GT3 Evo2	GTD	730	25th	6th
2025	(Italy) Iron Dames	(Switzerland) Rahel Frey (Switzerland) Karen Gaillard (Denmark) Michelle Gatting	Porsche 911 GT3 R (992)	GTD	719	33rd	8th
