= Célia Martin =

French racing driver (born 1991)

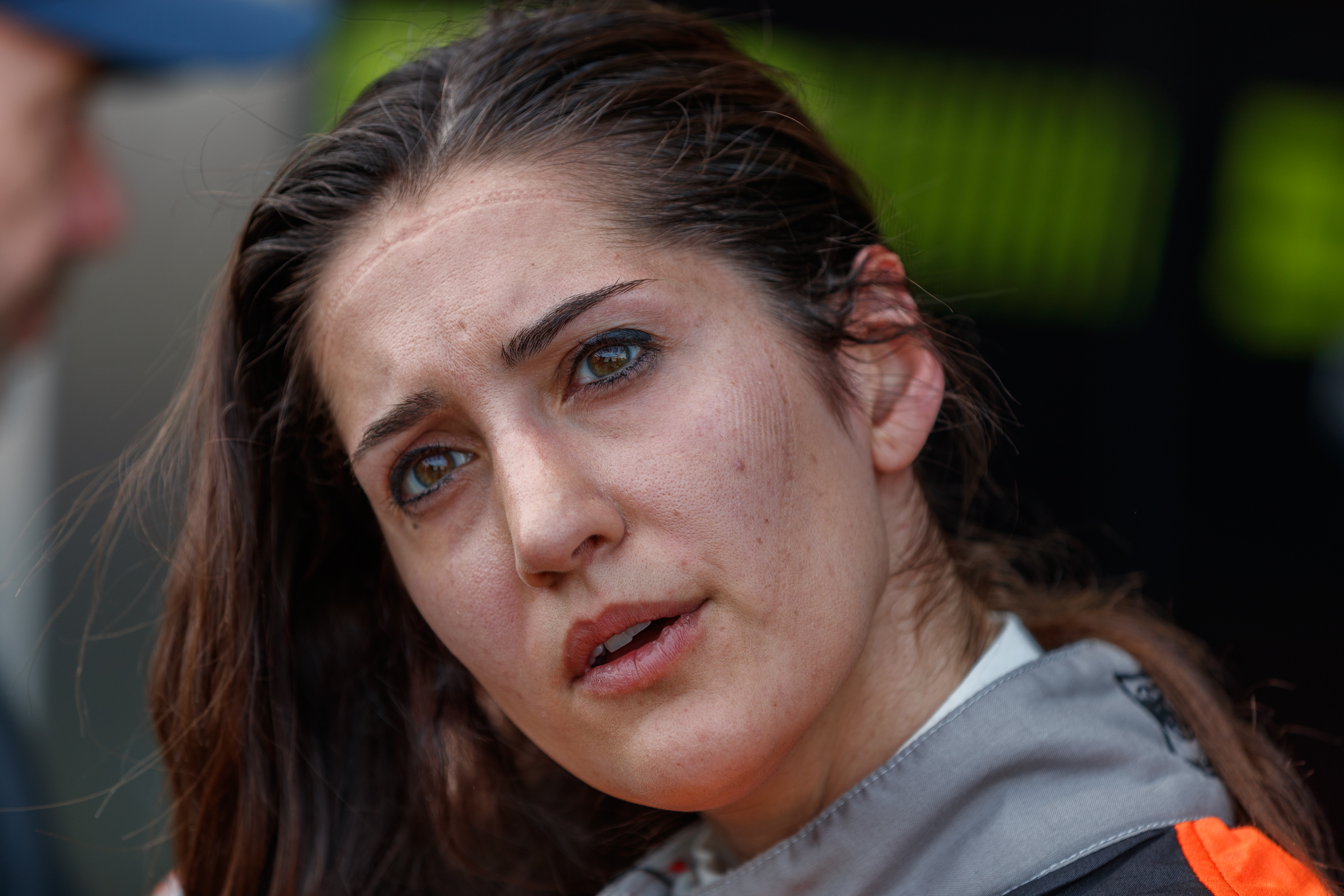
- Martin in 2023
- Nationality: French
- Born: 4 October 1991 (age 35) Bordeaux, France

Le Mans Cup career
- Categorisation: FIA Silver (until 2023); FIA Bronze (2024–)
- Teams: Iron Dames
- Car number: 83
- Starts: 7
- Poles: 1
- Best finish: 2nd in 2024

Previous series
- 2018–2024 2018-19 2022 2023 2024: Nürburgring Langstrecken-Serie; Jaguar I-Pace eTrophy; Indian Racing League; ADAC GT4 Germany; Le Mans Cup

Célia Martin (born 4 October 1991) is a racing driver from France. She currently competes for the Iron Dames in the FIA World Endurance Championship and the European Le Mans Series.

== Racing career ==
A late starter to motorsport at the age of 27, Martin began her career on the Nürburgring in 2018 having moved to Adenau in Germany the year prior in order to pursue racing professionally. After qualifying for a Level A Nürburgring permit, she joined WS Racing's "Girls Only" project in 2019. Remaining a regular member of the team until the end of 2023, Martin's Nürburgring highlight was a class win in the 2021 edition of the 24 Hours.

Having conducted testing for Jaguar Land Rover on the Nordschleife in 2018, Martin was entered in the first season of the electric Jaguar I-Pace eTrophy. Contesting the Pro-Am class, Martin finished fourth and last of the full-time drivers with five podium finishes.

In 2023, Martin entered ADAC GT4 Germany with her Girls Only co-driver Fabienne Wohlwend in a PROsport Racing-run Aston Martin. The pairing scored only one points finish in 12 races whilst their team-mates Mike David Ortmann and Hugo Sasse won the championship, and Martin was downgraded to a Bronze FIA rating at the end of the year.

In 2024, Martin joined the Iron Dames to drive in the Le Mans Cup, alongside Swiss driver Karen Gaillard. She took part in the European Le Mans Series and FIA World Endurance Championship end of season tests as a precursor to her being promoted to the Iron Dames' primary driver line-up, brought about after Sarah Bovy was promoted from Bronze to Silver rating.

== Racing record ==
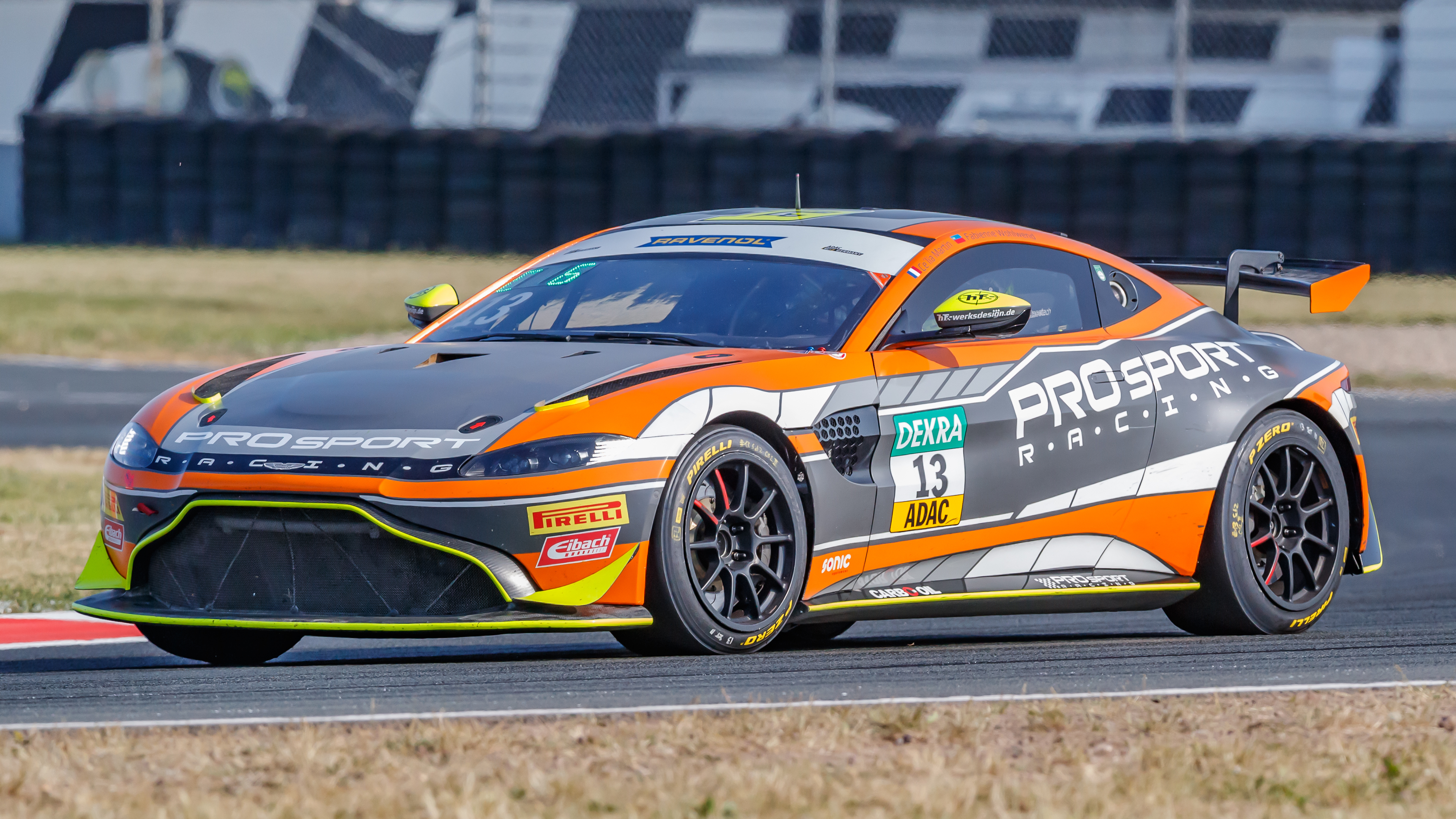
Martin's Aston Martin Vantage GT4 during the 2023 ADAC GT4 Germany Oschersleben round.

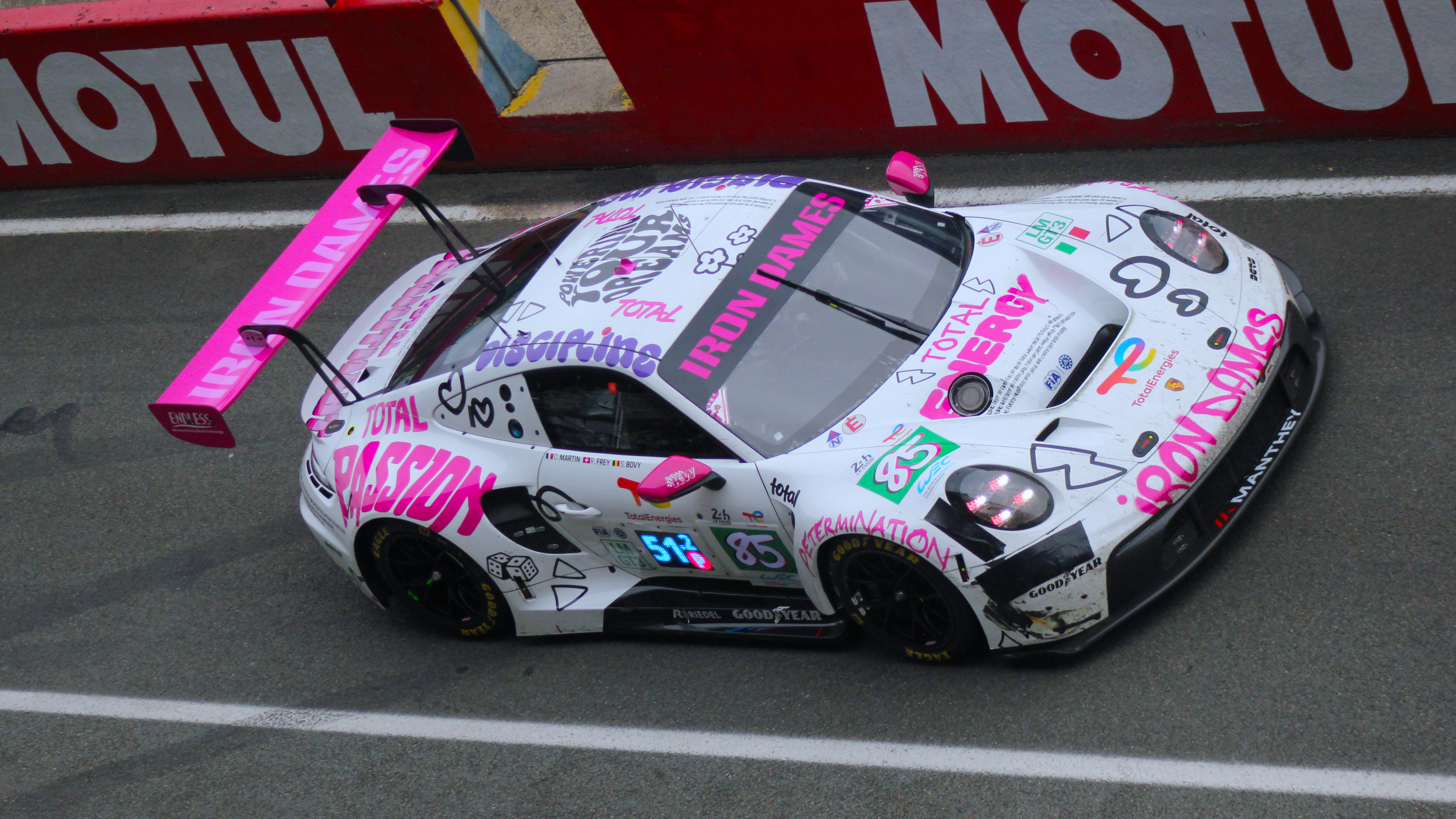
Martin competing in the 2025 24 Hours of Le Mans.

=== Career summary ===
Season	Series	Team	Races	Wins	Poles	F/Laps	Podiums	Points	Position
2018	VLN Series	Team Mathol Racing	1	0	0	0	0	3.42	?
2018–19	Jaguar I-Pace eTrophy - Pro-Am	Viessmann Jaguar I-PACE eTROPHY Team Germany	9	0	0	0	5	77	4th
2019	VLN Series - VT2		1	0	0	0	0	3.89	41st
2019	VLN Series - SP3T	WS Racing	2	1	0	0	2	?	?
2020	Nürburgring Langstrecken-Serie - SP3T	WS Racing	4	0	0	0	1	?	?
2020	Nürburgring Langstrecken-Serie - SP8T	WS Racing	1	1	1	0	1	?	?
2021	Nürburgring Langstrecken-Serie - SP8	WS Racing	1	1	1	0	1	?	?
2021	Nürburgring Langstrecken-Serie - SP8T	Yeeti Racing	2	0	0	0	2	?	?
2022	Nürburgring Langstrecken-Serie - SP10	PROsport Racing	1	?	?	?	?	?	?
2022	Indian Racing League	Speed Demons Delhi	6	0	0	0	0	NC	NC
2023	Nürburgring Langstrecken-Serie - SP8T	WS Racing	2	0	0	0	1	0	NC†
2023	Nürburgring Langstrecken-Serie - SP10	PROsport Racing	3	0	0	0	1	0	NC†
2023	ADAC GT4 Germany	PROsport Racing	12	0	0	0	0	4	34th
2024	Nürburgring Langstrecken-Serie - SP10	PROsport Racing	2	0	0	0	0	0	NC†
2024	Le Mans Cup - GT3	Iron Dames	7	0	1	0	1	43	6th
2024–25	Asian Le Mans Series - GT	Iron Dames	6	0	0	0	0	16	15th
2025	FIA World Endurance Championship - LMGT3	Iron Dames	8	0	0	0	0	19	18th
2025	European Le Mans Series - LMGT3	Iron Dames	6	1	1	0	2	62	4th
2026	GT3 Revival Series	Klausen Racing							
2026	GT2 European Series - Masters	LP Racing							
2026	24H Series - GT3	Saintéloc Junior Team	1	0	0	0	0	42	26th
2026	Nürburgring Langstrecken-Serie - Cup3	Renazzo Motorsport							
2026	Nürburgring Langstrecken-Serie - Cup3	Mühlner Motorsport							

=== Complete Nürburgring 24 Hours results ===
Year	Team	Co-Drivers	Car	Class	Laps	Ovr. Pos.	Class Pos.
2020	(Germany) WS Racing	(Austria) Laura Kraihamer (Germany) Carrie Schreiner	Volkswagen Golf Mk.7 TCR	SP3T	62	72nd	**3rd**
2021	(Germany) WS Racing	(United Kingdom) Pippa Mann (Denmark) Christina Nielsen (Germany) Carrie Schreiner	Audi R8 LMS GT4 Evo	SP8	52	45th	**1st**
2022	(Germany) WS Racing	(United Kingdom) Pippa Mann (Germany) Carrie Schreiner (Liechtenstein) Fabienne Wohlwend	BMW M4 (F82) GT4	SP8T	139	35th	**3rd**
2023	(Germany) WS Racing	(United Kingdom) Pippa Mann (Netherlands) Beitske Visser (Liechtenstein) Fabienne Wohlwend	BMW M4 (G82) GT4	SP8T	135	81st	**2nd**

=== Complete Le Mans Cup results ===
(key) (Races in bold indicate pole position; results in italics indicate fastest lap)

Year	Entrant	Class	Car	1	2	3	4	5	6	7	Rank	Points
2024	Iron Dames	GT3	Lamborghini Huracán GT3 Evo 2	BAR; 7	**LEC**; 2	LMS; 1; 7	LMS; 2; 16	SPA; 11	MUG; 5	ALG; 7	6th	43

=== Complete FIA World Endurance Championship results ===
(key) (Races in bold indicate pole position) (Races in italics indicate fastest lap)

Year	Entrant	Class	Car	Engine	1	2	3	4	5	6	7	8	Rank	Points
2025	Iron Dames	LMGT3	Porsche 911 GT3 R (992)	Porsche M97/80 4.2 L Flat-6	QAT; 13	IMO; 8	SPA; 10	LMS; 10	SÃO; 4	COA; Ret	FUJ; 13	BHR; 12	18th	19

^{*} Season still in progress.

=== Complete 24 Hours of Le Mans results ===
Year	Team	Co-Drivers	Car	Class	Laps	Pos.	Class Pos.
2025	(Italy) Iron Dames	(Belgium) Sarah Bovy (Switzerland) Rahel Frey	Porsche 911 GT3 R (992)	LMGT3	334	48th	16th

=== Complete European Le Mans Series results ===
(key) (Races in bold indicate pole position; results in italics indicate fastest lap)

Year	Entrant	Class	Chassis	Engine	1	2	3	4	5	6	Rank	Points
2025	Iron Dames	LMGT3	Porsche 911 GT3 R (992)	Porsche M97/80 4.2 L Flat-6	CAT; 1	LEC; 7	IMO; 9	SPA; 4	**SIL**; 10	ALG; 3	4th	62
