= Michelle Gatting =

Danish racing driver (born 1993)

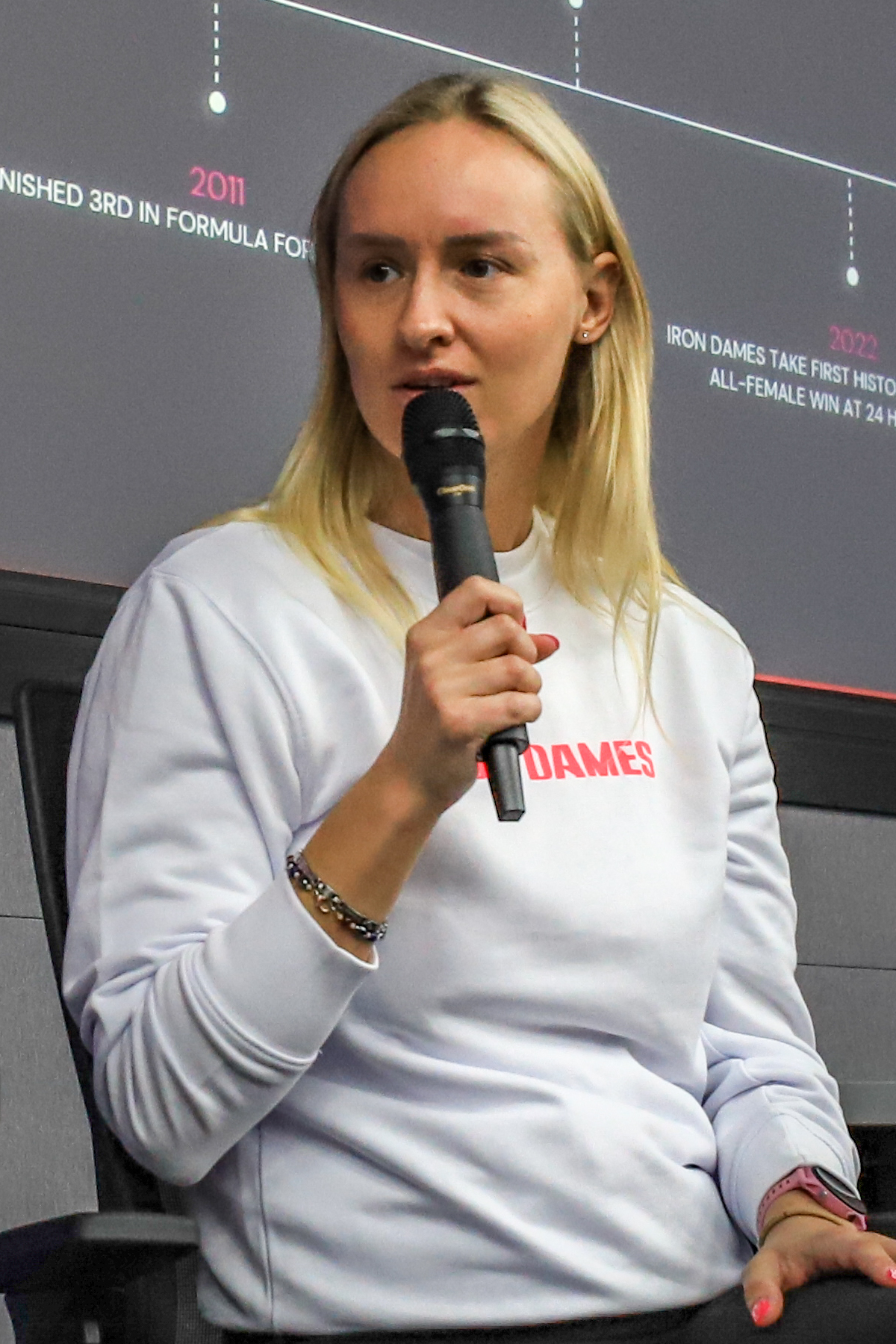
- Gatting in 2024
- Nationality: (Denmark) Danish
- Born: Michelle Sophie Gatting Brændstrup; 31 December 1993 (age 32) Århus, Denmark

European Le Mans Series – GTE
- Categorisation: FIA Silver (2018–2023, 2027–); FIA Gold (2024–2026)
- Years active: 2019–2020
- Teams: Kessel Racing
- Starts: 9
- Wins: 0
- Poles: 0
- Fastest laps: 0
- Best finish: 4th in 2019

Previous series
- 2011 2012-13 2014 2016-18 2020 2020: Formula Ford Denmark; Volkswagen Scirocco R-Cup; Porsche Carrera Cup Germany; Danish Thundersport Championship; Ferrari Challenge Europe – Trofeo Pirelli (Pro); TCR Denmark Touring Car Series

Championship titles
- 2021: Ferrari Challenge Europe - Trofeo Pirelli (Pro)

Michelle Sophie Gatting Brændstrup (born 31 December 1993 in Århus) is a racing driver from Denmark. An Iron Dame since the project's inception, she is a Porsche contracted driver having most recently competing in the FIA World Endurance Championship and the European Le Mans Series.

== Racing record ==
=== Career summary ===
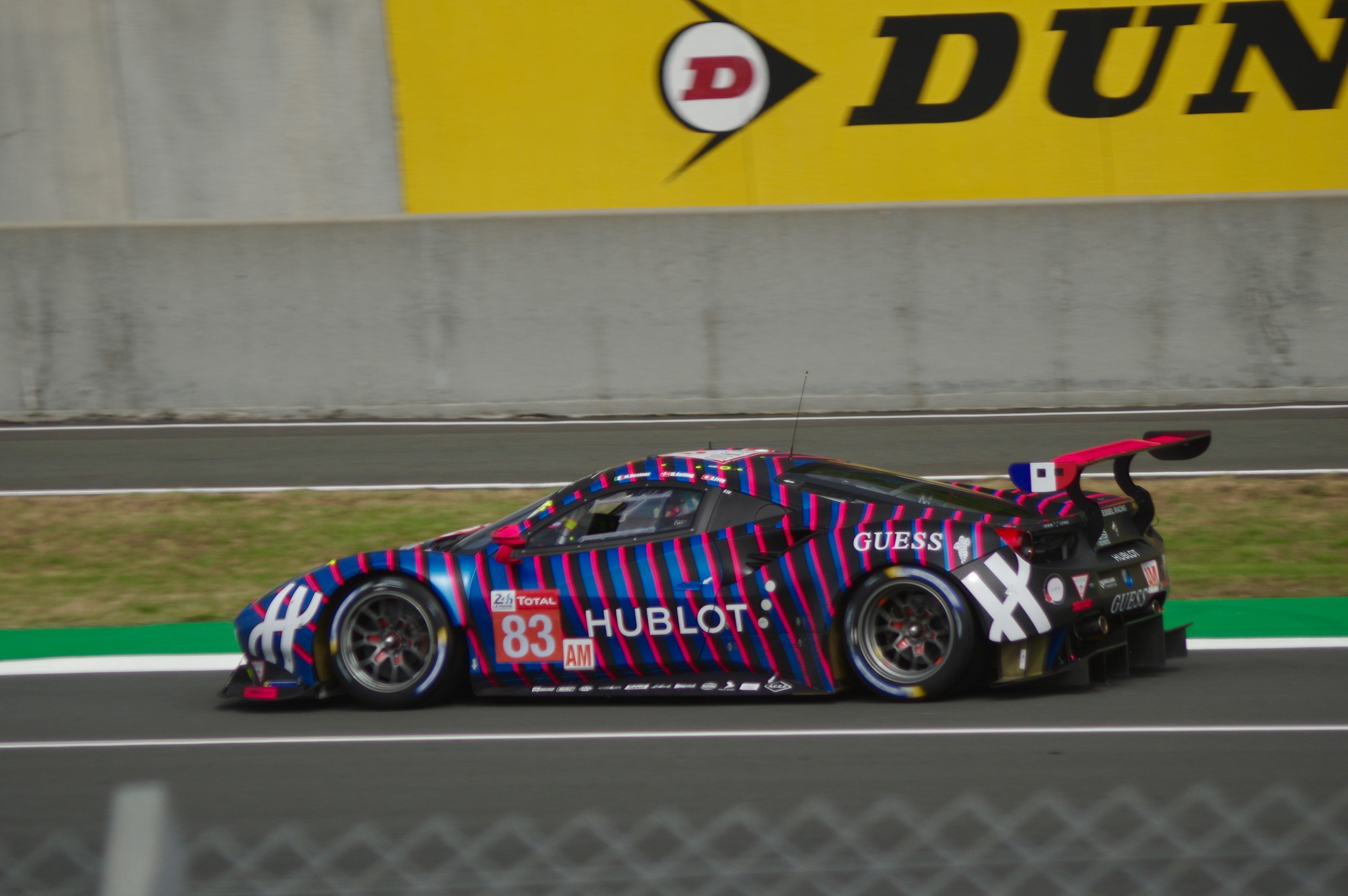
Gatting competing in the 2019 24 Hours of Le Mans.

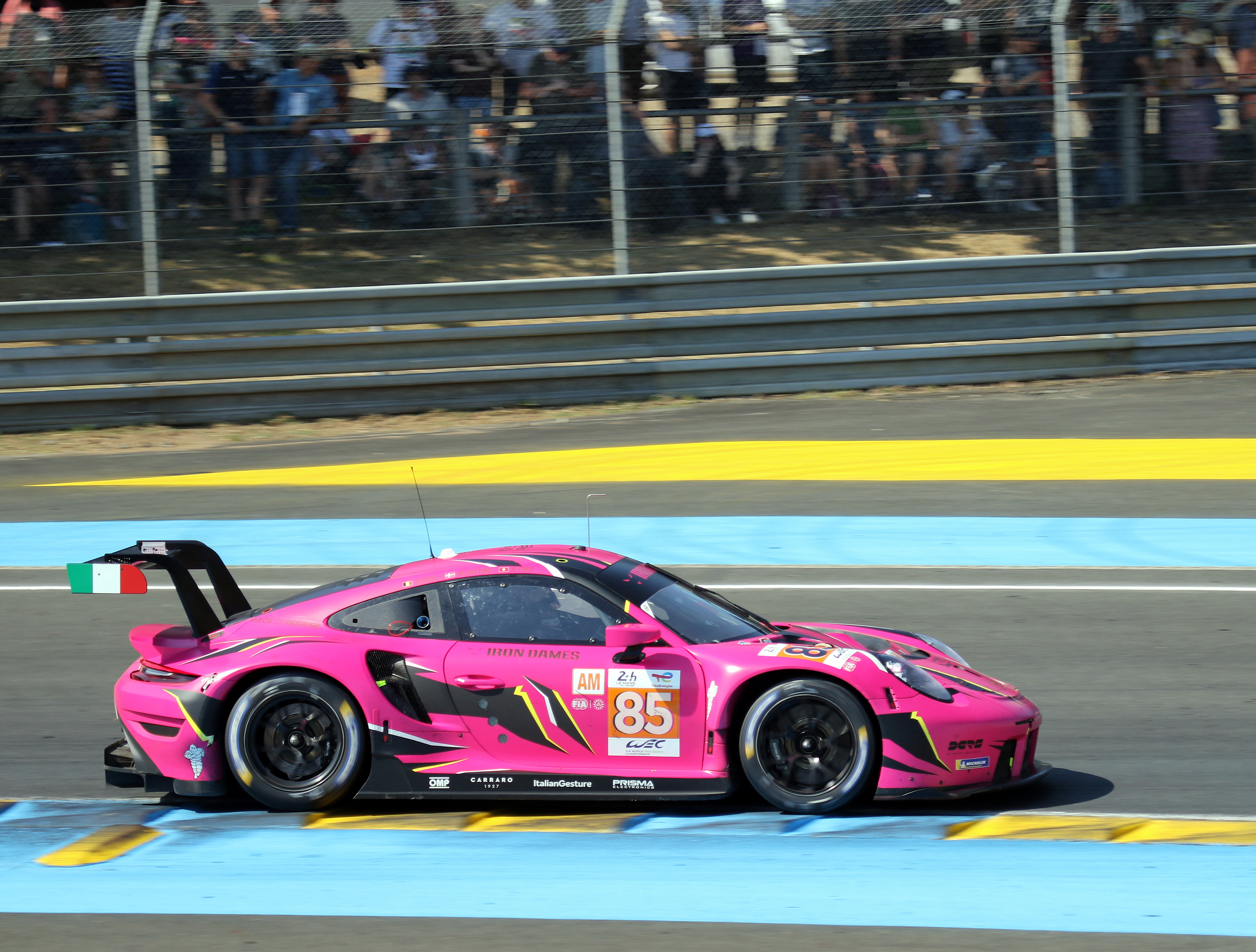
Gatting competing in the 2023 24 Hours of Le Mans.

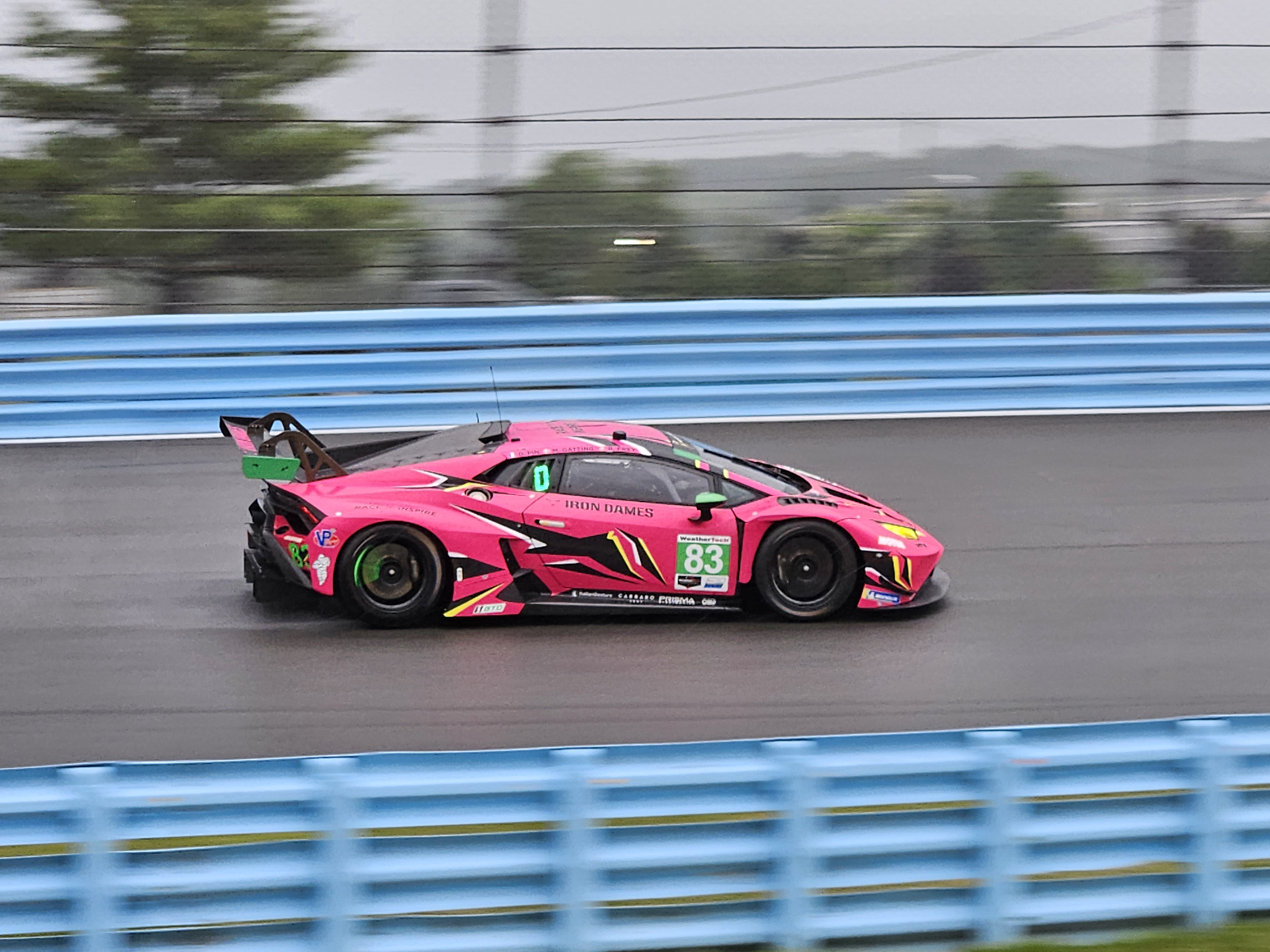
Gatting competing in the 2023 6 Hours of The Glen.

Season	Series	Team	Races	Wins	Poles	F/Laps	Podiums	Points	Position
2011	Formula Ford Denmark	Fluid Motorsport	17	1	0	1	7	219	**3rd**
2012	Volkswagen Scirocco R-Cup	N/A	10	0	0	1	0	183	11th
2013	Volkswagen Scirocco R-Cup	N/A	9	0	0	0	4	214	5th
2014	Porsche Carrera Cup Germany	Attempto Racing by Häring	12	0	0	0	0	1	30th
2014	International GT Open - GTS	Attempto Racing	2	0	0	0	0	0	NC
2016	Danish Thundersport Championship	LM Racing	20	1	0	0	3	193	8th
2017	Danish Thundersport Championship	MG Motorsport	18	0	0	2	7	217	7th
2018	Danish Thundersport Championship	Magnussen Racing Experience	3	0	0	0	0	42	18th
2018	Danish Supertourisme Turbo	Team Jørgen Hansen Biler	19	3	0	0	6	408	**3rd**
2018	Gulf 12 Hours - GT3 Pro-Am	Kessel Racing	1	0	0	0	1	N/A	**2nd**
2018–19	Asian Le Mans Series - LMP3	R24	1	0	0	0	0	4	13th
2019	European Le Mans Series - LMGTE	Kessel Racing	6	0	0	0	2	68	4th
2019	24 Hours of Le Mans - LMGTE Am	Kessel Racing	1	0	0	0	0	N/A	9th
2019	Super GT Danmark	Team Jørgen Hansen Biler	3	2	0	1	2	82	21st
2020	European Le Mans Series - LMGTE	Iron Lynx	5	0	0	0	3	61	5th
2020	Le Mans Cup - GT3	Iron Lynx	2	0	0	0	0	10	NC†
2020	24 Hours of Le Mans - LMGTE Am	Iron Lynx	1	0	0	0	0	N/A	9th
2020	TCR Denmark Touring Car Series	Peugeot Sport Denmark	2	0	0	0	0	3	16th
2020–21	Ferrari Challenge Europe - Trofeo Pirelli (Pro)	Iron Lynx - Scuderia Niki Hasler	4	1	2	0	3	51	6th
2021	Ferrari Challenge Europe - Trofeo Pirelli (Pro)	Iron Lynx - Scuderia Niki Hasler	14	3	5	4	12	171	**1st**
2021	Finali Mondiali - Trofeo Pirelli (Pro)	Iron Lynx - Scuderia Niki Hasler	1	0	0	0	0	N/A	5th
2021	FIA World Endurance Championship - LMGTE Am	Iron Lynx	3	0	0	0	0	32	12th
2021	European Le Mans Series - LMGTE	Iron Lynx	6	0	0	0	2	50	9th
2021	GT World Challenge Europe Endurance Cup	Iron Lynx	1	0	0	0	0	0	NC†
2021	GT World Challenge Europe Endurance Cup - Pro-Am	Iron Lynx	1	0	0	0	0	8	NC†
2021	Italian GT Endurance Championship - GT3	Iron Lynx	1	0	0	0	0	0	NC
2021	24 Hours of Le Mans - LMGTE Am	Iron Lynx	1	0	0	0	0	N/A	9th
2021	Danish Endurance Championship - Class 5	Cross Racing	4	1	0	0	1	?	?
2022	FIA World Endurance Championship - LMGTE Am	Iron Dames	5	0	0	0	3	92	5th
2022	GT World Challenge Europe Endurance Cup	Iron Dames	5	0	0	0	0	0	NC
2022	GT World Challenge Europe Endurance Cup - Gold	Iron Dames	5	1	1	0	2	77	**2nd**
2022	Intercontinental GT Challenge	Iron Dames	1	0	0	0	0	0	NC
2022	24 Hours of Le Mans - LMGTE Am	Iron Dames	1	0	0	0	0	N/A	7th
2022	Lamborghini Super Trofeo Europe	Iron Dames	2	0	1	0	1	0	NC†
2022	Lamborghini Super Trofeo - Grand Finals	Iron Dames	2	0	0	0	0	N/A	NC
2022	European Le Mans Series - LMGTE	Iron Lynx	6	1	0	0	2	70	**3rd**
2023	FIA World Endurance Championship - LMGTE Am	Iron Dames	7	1	0	0	2	118	**2nd**
2023	IMSA SportsCar Championship - GTD	Iron Dames	4	0	0	0	0	770	35th
2023	GT World Challenge Europe Endurance Cup	Iron Dames	5	0	0	0	0	0	NC
2023	24 Hours of Le Mans - LMGTE Am	Iron Dames	1	0	0	0	0	N/A	4th
2024	FIA World Endurance Championship - LMGT3	Iron Dames	7	0	2	1	0	54	8th
2024	European Le Mans Series - LMGT3	Iron Dames	6	1	4	2	1	65	4th
2024	IMSA SportsCar Championship - GTD	Iron Dames	3	0	0	0	0	*	*
2024–25	Asian Le Mans Series - GT	Iron Dames	6	0	0	0	0	16	15th
2025	FIA World Endurance Championship - LMGT3	Iron Dames	7	0	0	0	0	17	20th
2025	IMSA SportsCar Championship - GTD	Iron Dames	2	0	0	0	0	471	46th
2025	European Le Mans Series - LMGT3	Iron Dames	6	1	1	0	2	62	4th
2025	Nürburgring Langstrecken-Serie - AT3	Four Motors Bionconcept-Car							
2025–26	24H Series Middle East - GT3	Pure Rxcing							
2026	GT World Challenge Europe Endurance Cup	Rutronik Racing							
2026	Nürburgring Langstrecken-Serie - SP7	W&S Motorsport							
2026	Porsche Carrera Cup Scandinavia	Porsche Experience Racing	2	0	0	0	0	0	NC†

^{†} As Gatting was a guest driver she was ineligible for a championship position.

=== Complete European Le Mans Series results ===
(key) (Races in bold indicate pole position; results in italics indicate fastest lap)

Year	Entrant	Class	Chassis	Engine	1	2	3	4	5	6	Rank	Points
2019	Kessel Racing	LMGTE	Ferrari 488 GTE	Ferrari F154CB 3.9 L Turbo V8	LEC; 2	MNZ; 6					4th	68
2019	Kessel Racing	LMGTE	Ferrari 488 GTE Evo	Ferrari F154CB 3.9 L Turbo V8			CAT; 4	SIL; 2	SPA; 4	ALG; Ret	4th	68
2020	Iron Lynx	LMGTE	Ferrari 488 GTE Evo	Ferrari F154CB 3.9 L Turbo V8	LEC; 3	SPA; 5	LEC; 3	MNZ; 3	ALG; 6		5th	61
2021	Iron Lynx	LMGTE	Ferrari 488 GTE Evo	Ferrari F154CB 3.9 L Turbo V8	CAT; 4	RBR; NC	LEC; Ret	MNZ; 6	SPA; 3	ALG; 3	9th	50
2022	Iron Lynx	LMGTE	Ferrari 488 GTE Evo	Ferrari F154CB 3.9 L Turbo V8	LEC; 4	IMO; 8	MNZ; 5	CAT; Ret	SPA; 2	**ALG**; 1	3rd	70
2024	Iron Dames	LMGT3	Porsche 911 GT3 R (992)	Porsche M97/80 4.2 L Flat-6	**CAT**; Ret	**LEC**; 4	**IMO**; 1	SPA; Ret	MUG; 7	**ALG**; 2	4th	65
2025	Iron Dames	LMGT3	Porsche 911 GT3 R (992)	Porsche M97/80 4.2 L Flat-6	CAT; 1	LEC; 7	IMO; 9	SPA; 4	**SIL**; 10	ALG; 3	4th	62

=== Complete TCR Denmark Touring Car Series results ===
(key) (Races in bold indicate pole position) (Races in italics indicate fastest lap)

Year	Team	Car	1	2	3	4	5	6	7	8	9	10	11	12	13	14	15	16	17	18	DC	Points
2020	Peugeot Sport Denmark	Peugeot 308 TCR	JYL1; 1; 15†	JYL1; 2 Ret	JYL1; 3 DNS	JYL2; 1	JYL2; 2	JYL2; 3	JYL2; 4	JYL2; 5	JYL2; 6	DJU; 1	DJU; 2	DJU; 3	PAD; 1	PAD; 2	PAD; 3	JYL3; 1	JYL3; 2	JYL3; 3	16th	3

^{†} Drivers did not finish the race, but were classified as they completed over 75% of the race distance.

=== Complete FIA World Endurance Championship results ===
(key) (Races in bold indicate pole position) (Races in italics indicate fastest lap)

Year	Entrant	Class	Car	Engine	1	2	3	4	5	6	7	8	Rank	Points
2021	Iron Lynx	LMGTE Am	Ferrari 488 GTE Evo	Ferrari F154CB 3.9 L Turbo V8	SPA	ALG; 6	MNZ; 8	LMS; 6	FUJ	BHR			12th	32
2022	Iron Dames	LMGTE Am	Ferrari 488 GTE Evo	Ferrari F154CB 3.9 L Turbo V8	SEB; 5	SPA	LMS; 6	**MNZ**; 2	FUJ; 2	**BHR**; 3			5th	92
2023	Iron Dames	LMGTE Am	Porsche 911 RSR-19	Porsche 4.2 L Flat-6	**SEB**; 8	PRT; 3	SPA; 5	LMS; 4	**MNZ**; 5	FUJ; 4	**BHR**; 1		2nd	118
2024	Iron Dames	LMGT3	Lamborghini Huracán GT3 Evo 2	Lamborghini DGF 5.2 L V10	QAT; 8	IMO; Ret	**SPA**; 5	LMS; 4	**SÃO**; Ret	COA; 13	FUJ; 5	BHR; 10	8th	54
2025	Iron Dames	LMGT3	Porsche 911 GT3 R (992)	Porsche M97/80 4.2 L Flat-6	QAT; 13	IMO; 8	SPA; 10	LMS	SÃO; 4	COA; Ret	FUJ; 13	BHR; 12	20th	17

^{*} Season still in progress.

=== Complete IMSA SportsCar Championship results ===
(key) (Races in bold indicate pole position; races in italics indicate fastest lap)

Year	Entrant	Class	Make	Engine	1	2	3	4	5	6	7	8	9	10	11	Rank	Points
2023	Iron Dames	GTD	Lamborghini Huracán GT3 Evo 2	Lamborghini 5.2 L V10	DAY; 18	SEB; 11	LBH	LGA	WGL; 16	MOS	LIM	ELK	VIR	IMS	PET; 12	35th	770
2024	Iron Dames	GTD	Lamborghini Huracán GT3 Evo 2	Lamborghini 5.2 L V10	DAY; 6	SEB; 20	LBH	LGA	WGL; 15	MOS	ELK	VIR	IMS; 18	PET; 13		39th	918
2025	Iron Dames	GTD	Porsche 911 GT3 R (992)	Porsche 4.2 L Flat-6	DAY; 8	SEB; 11	LBH	LGA	WGL	MOS	ELK	VIR	IMS	PET		46th	471

^{*} Season still in progress.

=== Complete 24 Hours of Le Mans results ===
Year	Team	Co-Drivers	Car	Class	Laps	Pos.	Class Pos.
2019	(Switzerland) Kessel Racing	(Switzerland) Rahel Frey (Italy) Manuela Gostner	Ferrari 488 GTE	GTE; Am	330	39th	9th
2020	(Italy) Iron Lynx	(Switzerland) Rahel Frey (Italy) Manuela Gostner	Ferrari 488 GTE Evo	GTE; Am	332	34th	9th
2021	(Italy) Iron Lynx	(Switzerland) Rahel Frey (Belgium) Sarah Bovy	Ferrari 488 GTE Evo	GTE; Am	332	36th	9th
2022	(Italy) Iron Dames	(Switzerland) Rahel Frey (Belgium) Sarah Bovy	Ferrari 488 GTE Evo	GTE; Am	339	40th	7th
2023	(Italy) Iron Dames	(Belgium) Sarah Bovy (Switzerland) Rahel Frey	Porsche 911 RSR-19	GTE; Am	312	30th	4th
2024	(Italy) Iron Dames	(Belgium) Sarah Bovy (Switzerland) Rahel Frey	Lamborghini Huracán GT3 Evo 2	LMGT3	279	32nd	5th

=== Complete 24 Hours of Spa results ===
Year	Team	Co-Drivers	Car	Class	Laps	Pos.	Class Pos.
2022	(Italy) Iron Dames	(Belgium) Sarah Bovy (Switzerland) Rahel Frey (France) Doriane Pin	Ferrari 488 GT3 Evo 2020	Gold	531	18th	**1st**
2023	(Italy) Iron Dames	(Belgium) Sarah Bovy (Switzerland) Rahel Frey (France) Doriane Pin	Lamborghini Huracán GT3 Evo 2	Bronze	151	DNF	DNF
2026	(Germany) Rutronik Racing	(Hong Kong) Antares Au (Germany) Sven Müller (Estonia) Martin Rump	Porsche 911 GT3 R (992.2)	Bronze	457	43rd	7th

=== Complete 24 Hours of Daytona results ===
Year	Team	Co-Drivers	Car	Class	Laps	Pos.	Class Pos.
2023	(Italy) Iron Dames	(Belgium) Sarah Bovy (Switzerland) Rahel Frey (France) Doriane Pin	Lamborghini Huracán GT3 Evo 2	GTD	659	46th	18th
2024	(Italy) Iron Dames	(Belgium) Sarah Bovy (Switzerland) Rahel Frey (France) Doriane Pin	Lamborghini Huracán GT3 Evo 2	GTD	730	25th	6th
2025	(Italy) Iron Dames	(Belgium) Sarah Bovy (Switzerland) Rahel Frey (Switzerland) Karen Gaillard	Porsche 911 GT3 R (992)	GTD	719	33rd	8th
