= Iron Dames =

Italian-Swiss auto racing team

(Italy) (Switzerland) Iron Dames
- Founded: 2018
- Base: Zug, Switzerland
- Team principal(s): Deborah Mayer
- Founder(s): Deborah Mayer; Iron Lynx
- Current series: GT2 European Series
- Former series: WRC2; Le Mans Cup; French F4 Championship; European Le Mans Series; Asian Le Mans Series; FIA World Endurance Championship; IMSA SportsCar Championship; Formula Regional European Championship; Ferrari Challenge; Italian F4 Championship; ADAC Formula 4; Italian GT Championship; Ligier European Series
- Current drivers: Full list
- Website: www.irondames.ch

The Iron Dames are an Italian-Swiss auto racing and equestrian team founded by French businesswoman Deborah Mayer. They are based in Zug, Switzerland, and primarily participate in sports car racing. They are a subsidiary of the DC Racing Solutions parent company, which runs motorsport teams Prema Racing and Iron Lynx.

== Motorsport history ==
=== 2018 ===
Iron Dames was founded in 2018 by Deborah Mayer with the goal of supporting and promoting women in motorsport. Rahel Frey, Michelle Gatting, and Manuela Gostner became the projects' first drivers, competing in the 12 Hours of Dubai and placing second in the GT3 Pro-Am class (ninth overall).

=== 2019 ===
The team made their debut in the European Le Mans Series, racing under the Kessel Racing name.

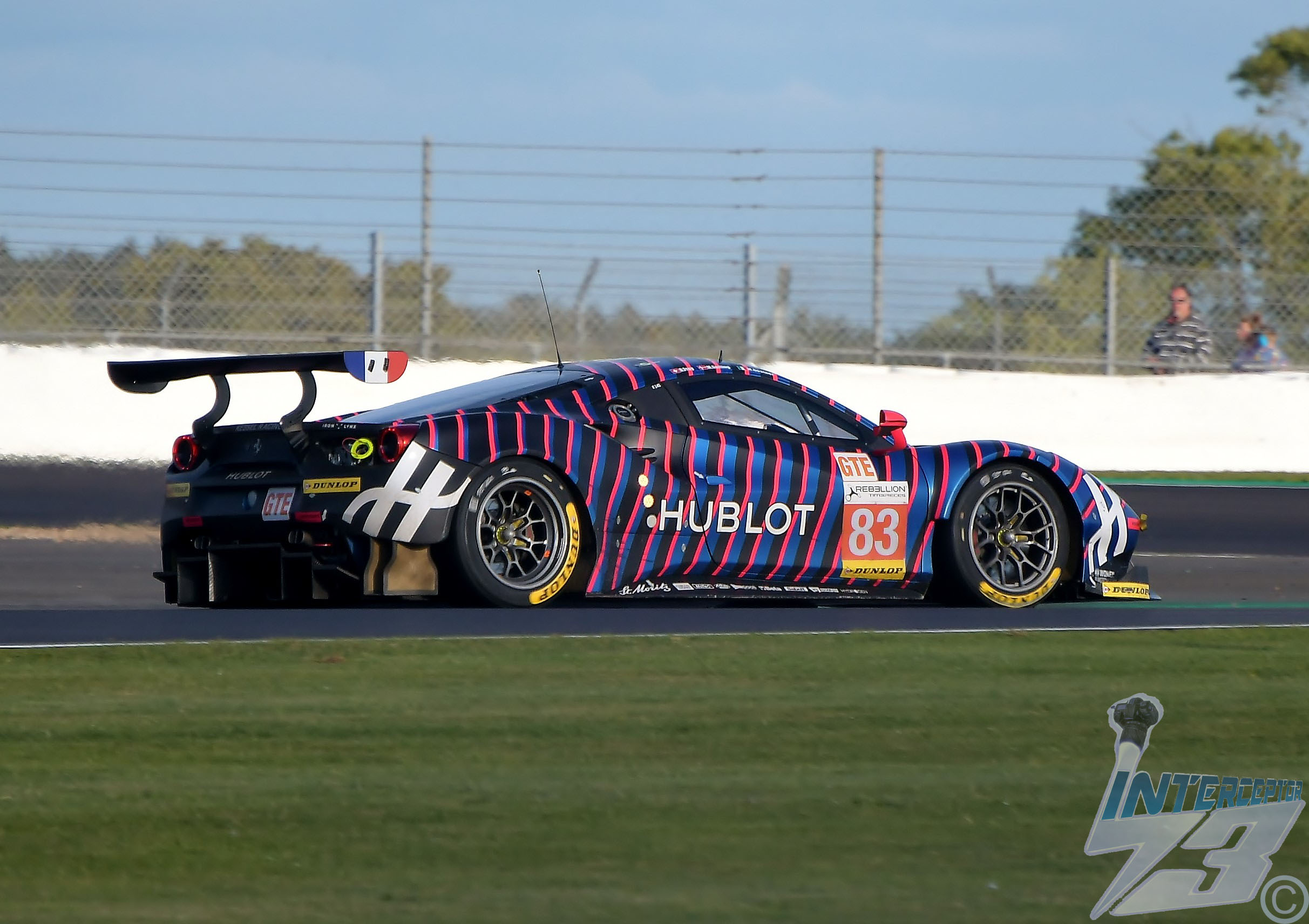
Manuela Gostner driving the Ferrari 488 GTE Evo in the 2019 European Le Mans Series

In the European Le Mans Series, the #83 “Iron Dames” car placed 4th and the #60 "Iron Lynx" placed 6th, with both entries standing on the podium twice over the season. In the 24 Hours of Le Mans, the #83 placed 9th in class, and the #60 placed 13th in class.

=== 2020 ===
2020 marked the first year of the team competing under the Iron Lynx name. In the European Le Mans Series they fielded the trio of Rahel Frey, Michelle Gatting, and Manuela Gostner for the #83 entry. Gatting and team owner Deborah Mayer teamed up for the Le Mans Cup, the first all-female pairing in the series, and were joined by reigning champions Giacomo Piccini and Rino Mastronardi. The team entered the Ferrari Challenge Europe for two rounds, under the name Iron Lynx – Scuderia Niki Hasler. Michelle Gatting competed in the Pro class, while Claudio Schiavoni competed in the Pro-Am class.

The team entered a car in the 24 Hours of Le Mans with the all-female line-up of Frey, Gatting, and Gostner, who placed 9th in the LMGTE Am class.

=== 2021 ===
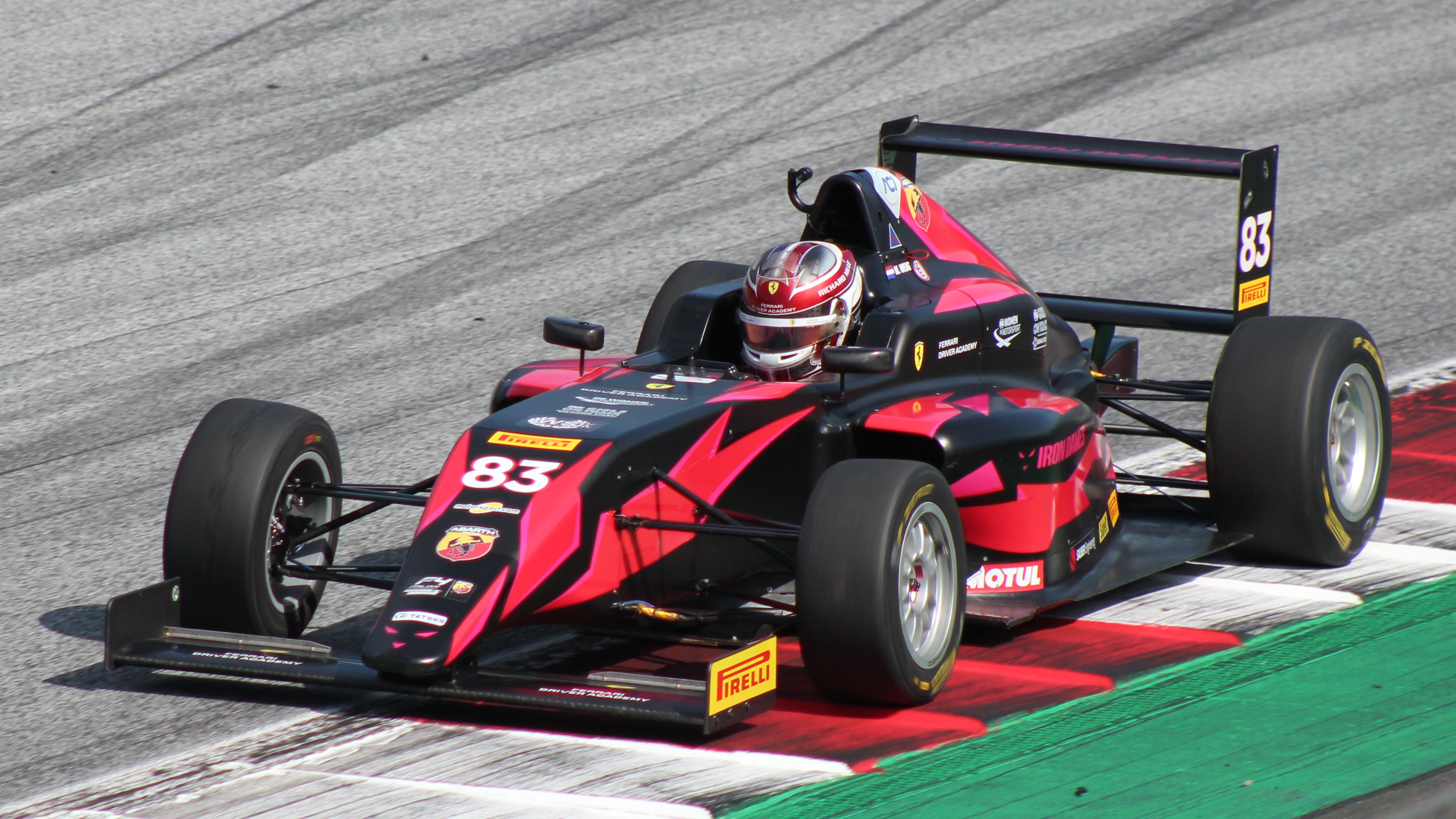
Maya Weug driving at the Red Bull Ring during the 2021 Italian F4 Championship.

==== European Le Mans Series ====
Former W Series driver Esmee Hawkey was announced alongside Frey and Gatting to contest the 2021 European Le Mans Series in the LMGTE class, however the Briton was fired before the first round after her manager Mark Blundell was discovered to have provided the incorrect licence grading to the team. Hawkey was initially replaced with Gostner before fellow W Series outcast Sarah Bovy finished the season after making her debut with the team in the Le Mans Cup. On November 20, 2021, Michelle Gatting became the first female champion of the Ferrari Challenge.

==== Italian F4 ====
The team and Iron Lynx signed Maya Weug to compete in the 2021 Italian F4 Championship. Weug had a successful debut season with three podiums and finished the season 7th in the championship.

=== 2022 ===
The Iron Dames car driven by Rahel Frey, Sarah Bovy and Michelle Gatting at the 2022 24 Hours of Le Mans.

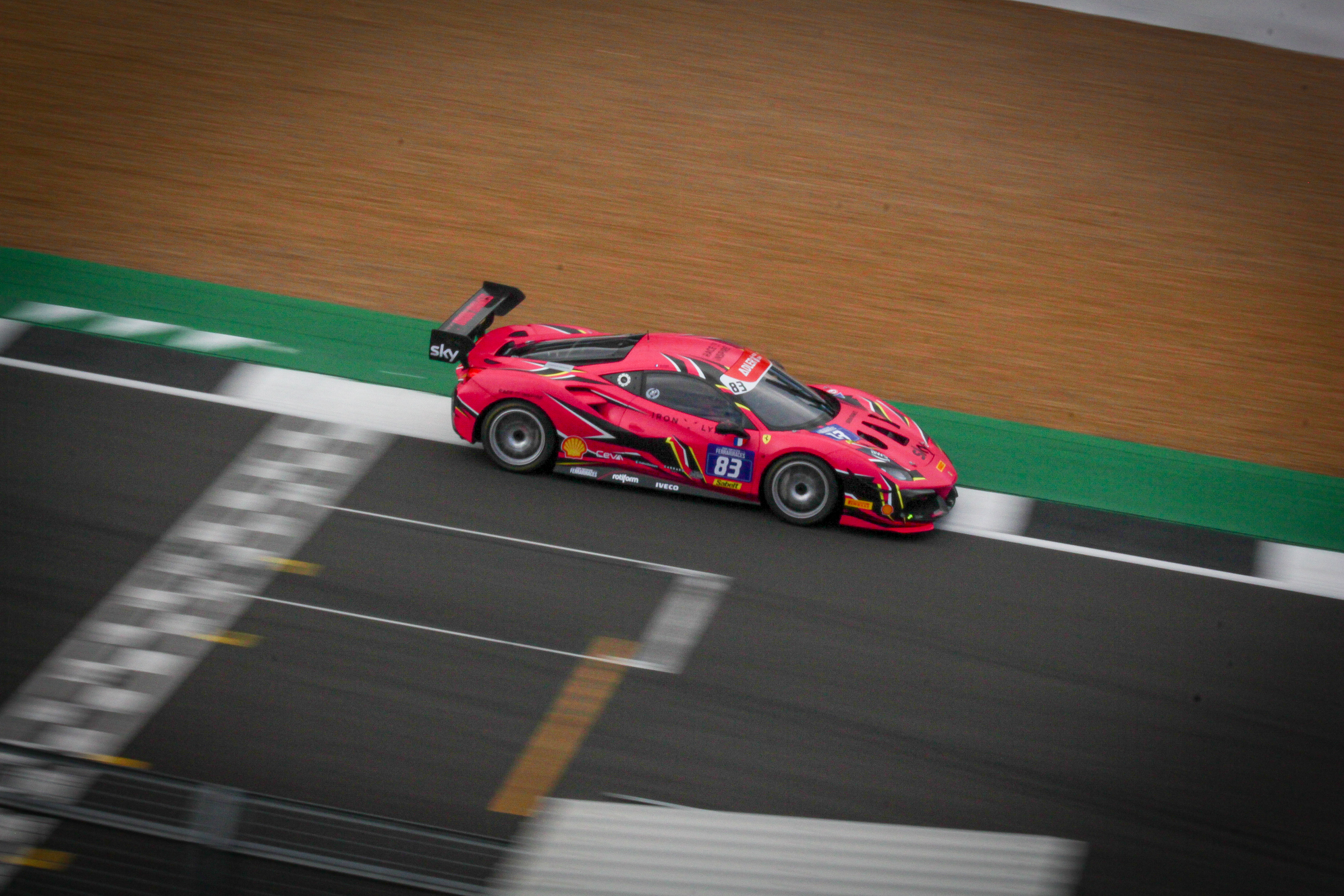
Doriane Pin on her way to victory in a Ferrari Challenge race at Silverstone.

On January 12, 2022, the Iron Dames announced that they would enter in the GTE Am class of the World Endurance Championship for 2022. They ran the Ferrari 488 GTE Evo, with Rahel Frey in the #85 Iron Dames entry. The Iron Dames began racing under their own license, fielding a team of Frey, Gatting, and Sarah Bovy in WEC, ELMS, and GTWC Europe Gold Cup. The team began supporting drivers in F4 and karting, with Maya Weug representing the team and entering select ADAC F4 rounds, as well as a full season in Italian F4 alongside Ivan Domingues and Nicola Lacorte.

They entered a car in the LMGTE category of the 24 Hours of Le Mans, with a best finish of 7th in class for the #85 Iron Dames car. Sarah Bovy became the first woman to claim a pole position in WEC history, qualifying first at both Monza and Bahrain. Three podiums in the series helped the Iron Dames clinch third place in the GTE Am category. The Iron Dames finished the GTWS Europe season in second in the Gold Cup, with a class victory at the 24 Hours of Spa and a pole position at the final race in Barcelona. In the European Le Mans Series, the #85 took a class victory, and eventually finished third in the LMGTE teams championship. Doriane Pin took a dominant victory in the Ferrari Challenge, winning nine of fourteen races, with thirteen podiums, ten pole positions, and eleven fastest laps.

=== 2023 ===
At the 2023 8 Hours of Bahrain, Iron Dames became the final LM GTE class race winning team in the FIA World Endurance Championship. Their drivers – Sarah Bovy, Michelle Gatting, and Rahel Frey – became the first all-female lineup to win an FIA WEC race.

=== 2024 ===
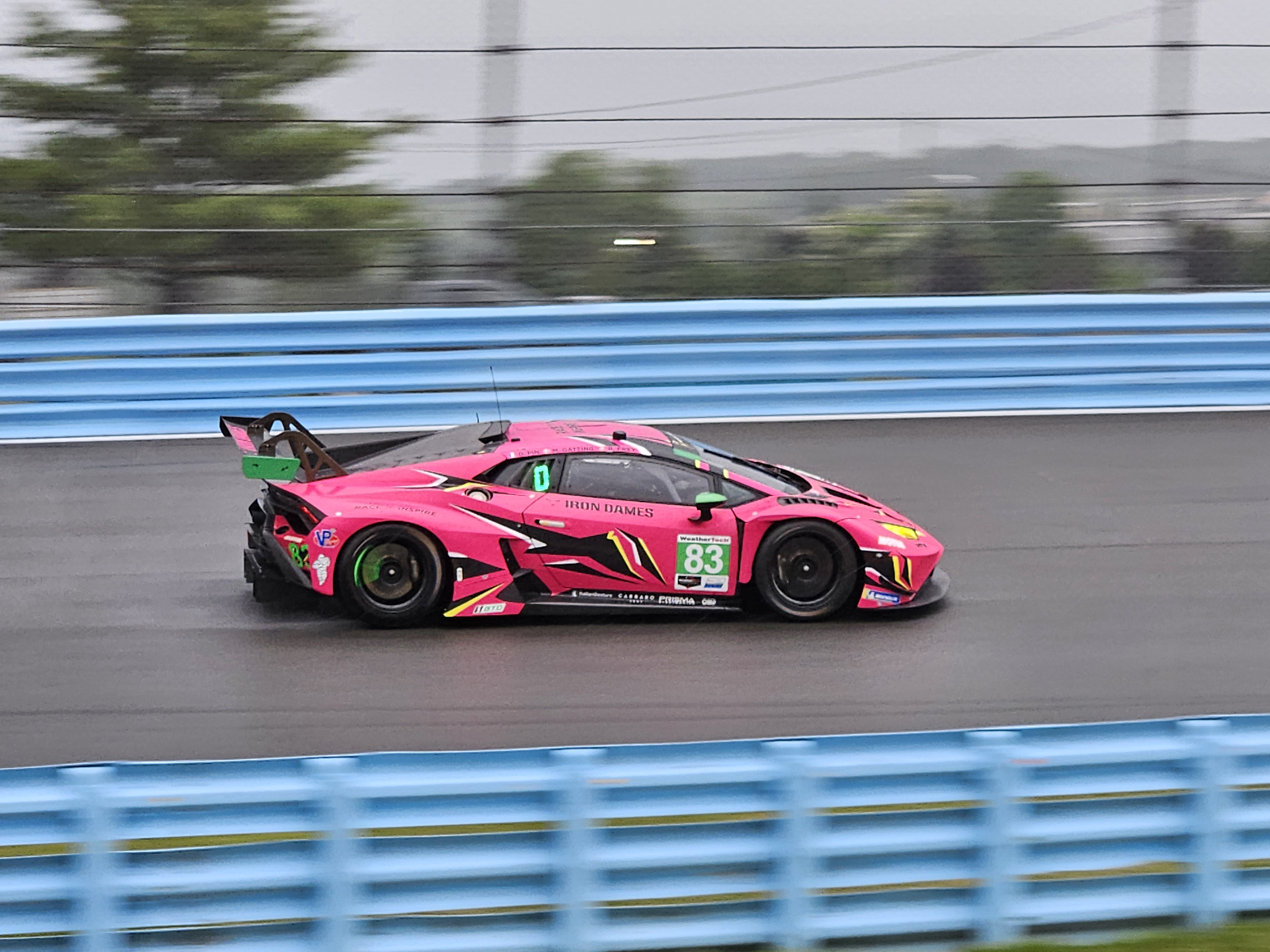
The Iron Dames competing in the 2023 6 Hours of The Glen.

==== WEC ====
For 2024, Iron Lynx became the de facto Lamborghini factory team in the 2024 FIA World Endurance Championship – Iron Lynx campaigned a single Lamborghini SC63 in the Hypercar, whilst both programs fielded one Huracán GT3 Evo2 each in the LMGT3 class. Bovy and Gatting were retained, with Gatting promoted to Gold status, whilst Frey (demoted to Silver) was replaced with Pin – the Swiss saw her driving duties reduced as she took on a greater role within team management.

Frey returned to the driving line-up after Pin suffered broken ribs in a cycling accident before Spa.

Following a troublesome campaign for both entries in WEC, Iron Lynx and Lamborghini terminated their partnership at seasons' end.

==== Formula Regional ====
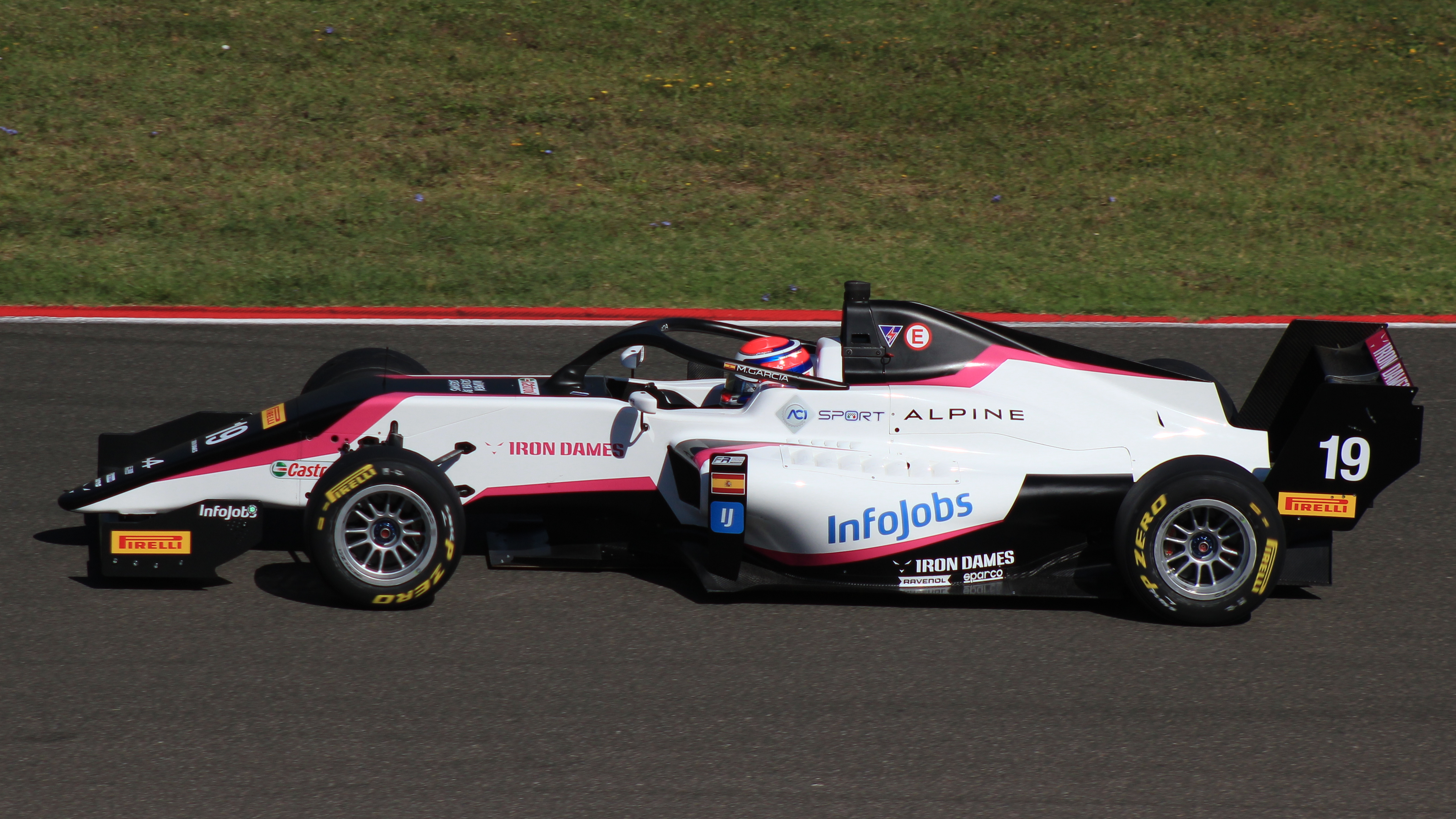
Marta García driving in the 2024 Formula Regional European Championship.

For 2024, the team entered into the 2024 Formula Regional European Championship with drivers Doriane Pin and Marta García. The team finished eleventh in the teams' championship.

==== Rallying ====
For 2024, the Iron Dames expanded into rallying - Sarah Rumeau and Julie Amblard participated in the Rally4 class of the French Rally Championship with Sarrazin Motorsport. The partnership scored one top-five finish in both tarmac and gravel disciplines and finished in the top-five of the Asphalt championship.

=== 2025 ===
For 2025, the Iron Dames supported sixteen drivers across endurance, single-seater, rally and karting competitions.

==== WEC ====
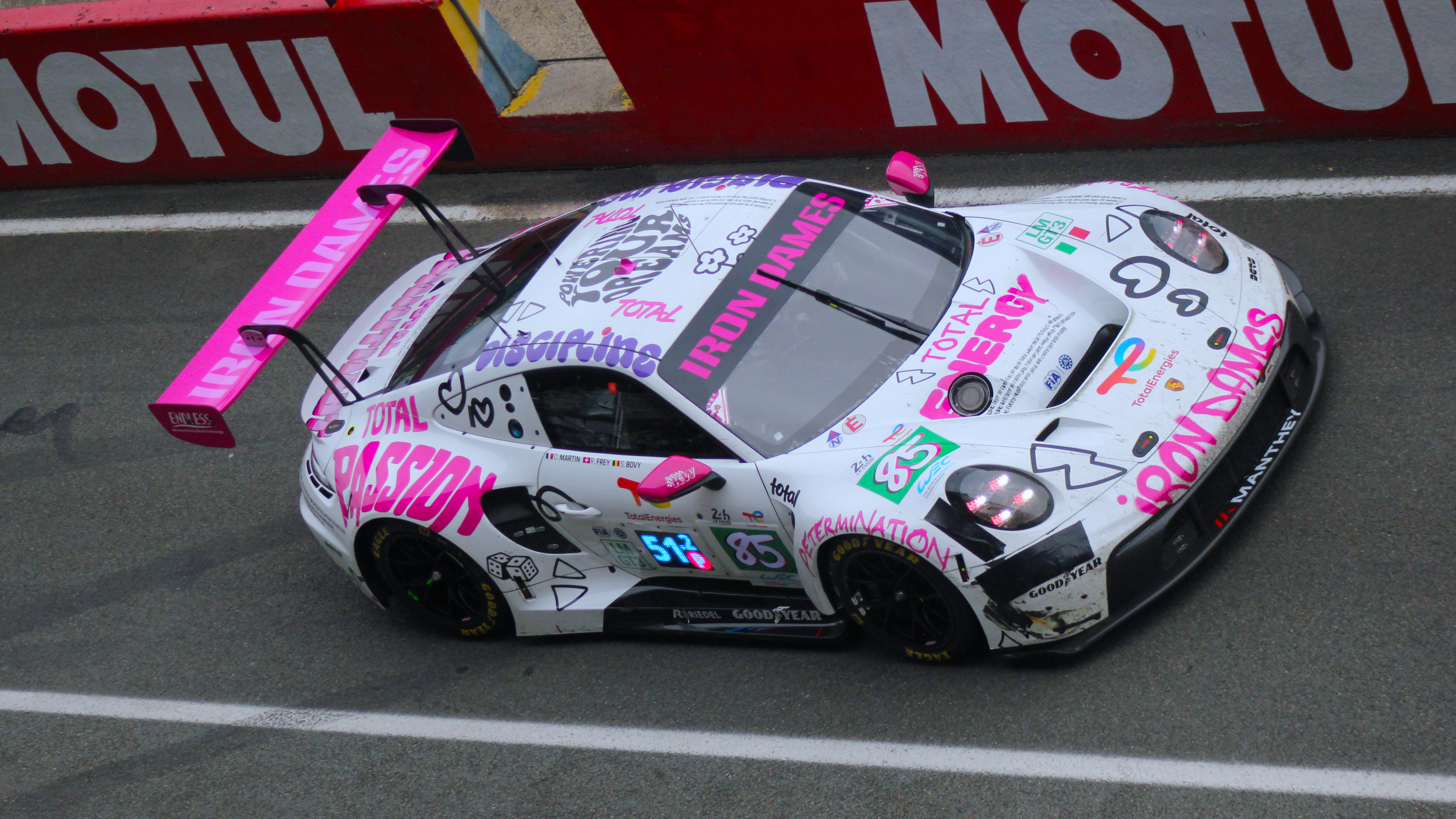
The Iron Dames competing in the 2025 24 Hours of Le Mans.

Following Iron Lynx' manufacturer split at the end of 2024, the Iron Dames project aligned with Porsche for the 2025 FIA World Endurance Championship, partnering with Manthey Racing to campaign a 992-edition 911 GT3 R. This coincided with Porsche hiring Gatting as a factory driver.

==== Rally ====
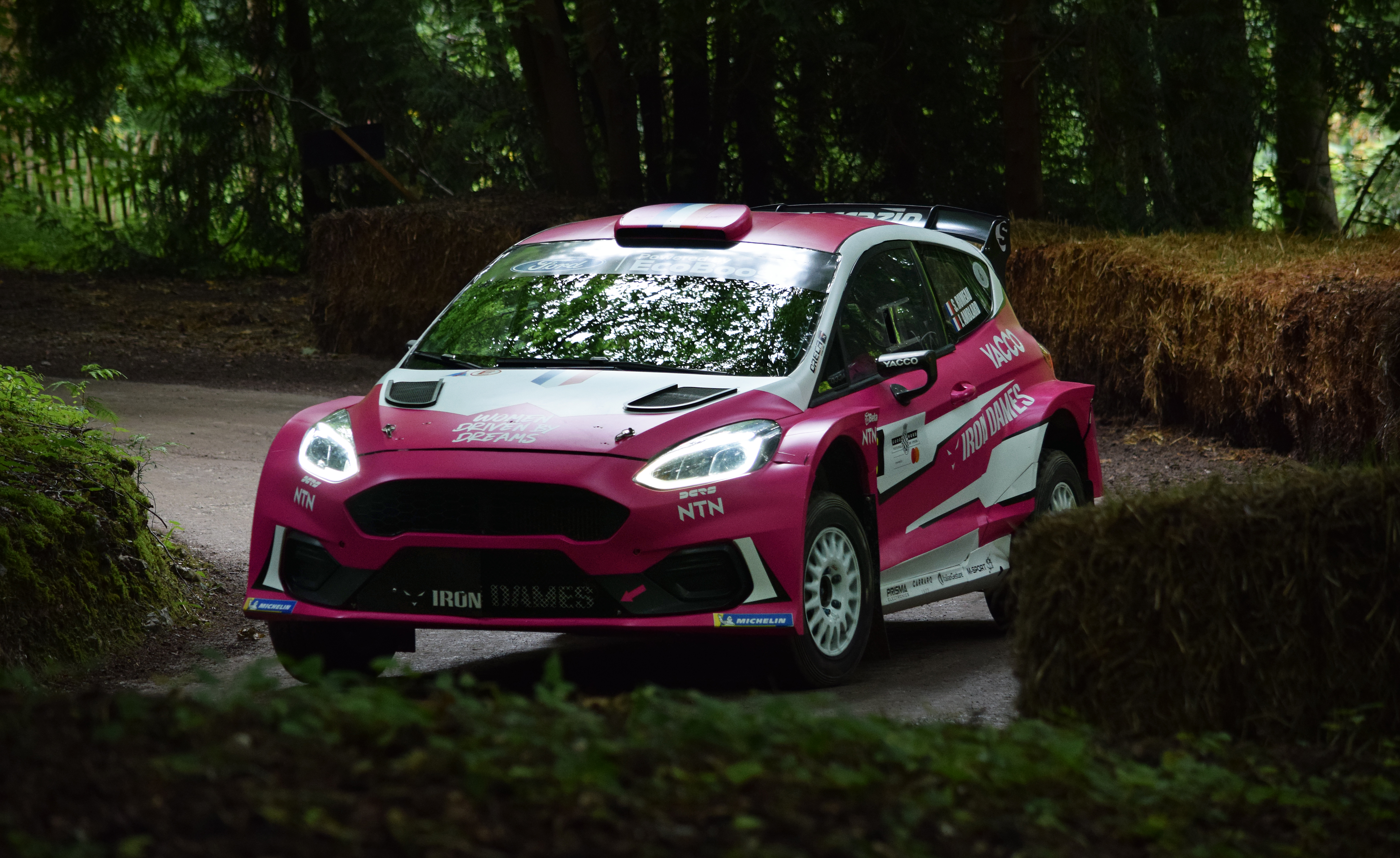
Rumeau and Amblard's Ford Fiesta Rally2 at the 2024 Goodwood Festival of Speed.

The team expanded their rally program for 2025, with Sarah Rumeau and Julie Amblard joining the WRC2 Championship and continuing in the French Rally Championship having upgraded to Rally2 machinery.

=== 2026 ===
In November 2025, the Iron Dames confirmed they would be exiting from the World Endurance Championship in 2026. The team also did not enter a car in the IMSA Championship or the European Le Mans Series. Team founder Deborah Mayer stated that the project would be moving towards a mixed-gender approach by supporting individual drivers.

The Iron Dames entered a car piloted by Sarah Bovy and Laura van den Hengel into the GT2 European Series. In April, Sarah Rumeau and Julie Amblard won the Rallye Terre des Causses, their first victory and the first victory in the series by a female driver since 1986.

== Equestrian history ==
=== 2024 ===
In September 2023, Iron Dames announced an expansion into the world of equestrian sports, acquiring Global Champions Tour team Cannes Stars to compete in the show jumping discipline for the 2024 season.

=== 2025 ===
For 2025, Iron Dames Equestrian doubled the size of their squad by acquiring the Monaco Comets outfit.

=== 2026 ===
Janne Friedericke Meyer-Zimmermann has left the team Iron Dames in June 2026.

== List of Iron Dames members ==
=== Motorsport ===
==== Current ====
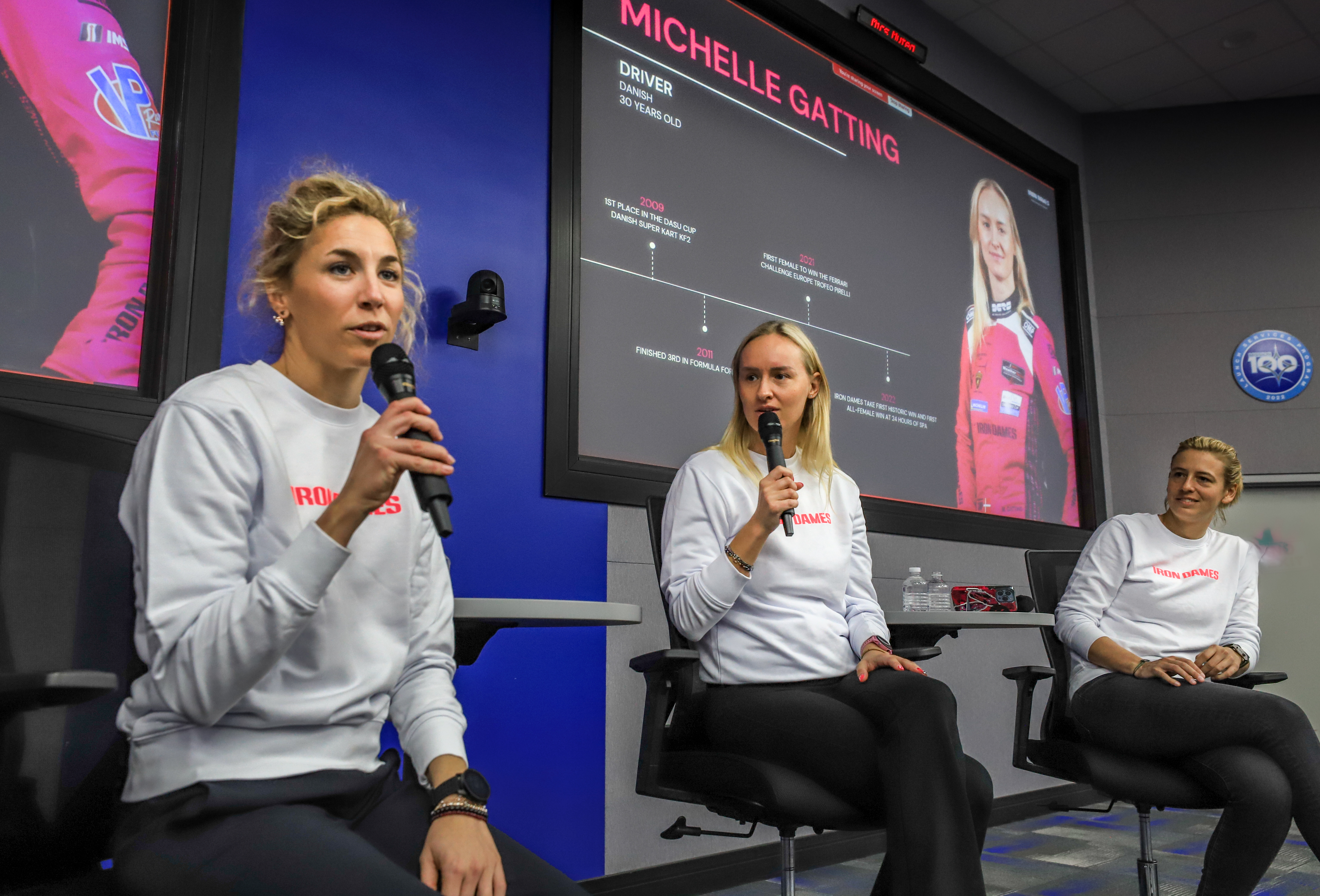
L-R: Rahel Frey, Michelle Gatting, Sarah Bovy.

Driver	Began	Current series	Titles as Iron Dames driver
(Switzerland) Rahel Frey	2019	TBA	None as Iron Dames driver
(Denmark) Michelle Gatting	2019	TBA	Ferrari Challenge Europe - Trofeo Pirelli (Pro)
(Belgium) Sarah Bovy	2021	GT2 European Series	None as Iron Dames driver
(France) Doriane Pin	2021	European Le Mans Series	Ferrari Challenge Europe - Trofeo Pirelli (Pro); F1 Academy
(Spain) Natalia Granada	2023	F1 Academy	None as Iron Dames driver
(France) Sarah Rumeau	2024	French Rally Championship; French Gravel Rally Championship; WRC2 Championship	None as Iron Dames driver
(France) Julie Amblard	2024	French Rally Championship; French Gravel Rally Championship; WRC2 Championship	None as Iron Dames driver
(France) Célia Martin	2024	GT3 Revival Series	None as Iron Dames driver
(Switzerland) Karen Gaillard	2024	Porsche Carrera Cup Italy	None as Iron Dames driver
(France) Mia Oger	2024	WSK Karting (OKJ); Champions of the Future Academy	None as Iron Dames driver
(Brazil) Vicky Farfus	2024	Ginetta Junior Championship	None as Iron Dames driver
(Spain) Marta García	2024	TBA	None as Iron Dames driver
(Spain) Luna Fluxá	2024	F4 Spanish Championship	Champions of the Future Academy - OK-N
(Belgium) Vanina Ickx	2025	TBA	None as Iron Dames driver
(France) Lisa Billard	2025	F1 Academy French F4 Championship	None as Iron Dames driver
(Spain) Angelina Simons	2025	WSK Karting (OKJ); Champions of the Future Academy (Note: Supported by F1 Academy.)	None as Iron Dames driver
(Netherlands) Laura van den Hengel	2025	GT2 European Series	None as Iron Dames driver
(France) Emma Chalvin	2025	Opel Corsa E-Rally Cup	None as Iron Dames driver
(Australia) Ava Lawrence	2025	British Champions of the Future Academy	None as Iron Dames driver
(Bulgaria) Alexandra Vateva	2025	Porsche Carrera Cup Germany	None as Iron Dames driver

==== Former ====
Driver	Years active	Series participations	Titles as Iron Dames driver
(Italy) Manuela Gostner	2019–2021	European Le Mans Series (2019–2021); FIA World Endurance Championship (2021); Le Mans Cup (2021)	None
(Netherlands) Maya Weug	2021–2022	Italian F4 Championship (2021–2022); ADAC Formula 4 (2021–2022)	None
(United Kingdom) Katherine Legge	2021	FIA World Endurance Championship (2021)	None
(Denmark) Christina Nielsen	2022	FIA World Endurance Championship (2022)	None
(Brazil) Aurelia Nobels	2023	Italian F4 Championship (2023)	None

=== Equestrian ===
==== Current ====
Rider	Years active	Sub-team
(Sweden) Angelica Augustsson-Zanotelli	2025	Monaco Comets
(United States) Natalie Dean	2024–25	Cannes Stars
(Germany) Katrin Eckermann	2024–25	Cannes Stars
(Germany) Sophie Hinners	2024–25	Cannes Stars
(France) Inès Joly	2025	Monaco Comets
(Greece) Ioli Mytilineou	2025	Monaco Comets
(Monaco) Anastasia Nielsen	2025	Cannes Stars
(France) Jeanne Sadran	2025	Monaco Comets
(Germany) Jörne Sprehe	2025	Monaco Comets
(Netherlands) Sanne Thijssen	2024–2025	Cannes Stars
(Australia) Edwina Tops-Alexander	2025	Monaco Comets

==== Former ====
Rider	Years active	Sub-team
(Netherlands) Kim Emmen	2024	Cannes Stars

== Current motorsport results ==
=== 24 Hours of Le Mans results ===
Year	Entrant	No.	Car	Drivers	Class	Laps	Pos.	Class Pos.
2019	(Switzerland) Kessel Racing	83	Ferrari 488 GTE	(Switzerland) Rahel Frey (Denmark) Michelle Gatting (Italy) Manuela Gostner	LMGTE Am	330	39th	9th
2020	(Italy) Iron Dames	85	Ferrari 488 GTE Evo	(Switzerland) Rahel Frey (Denmark) Michelle Gatting (Italy) Manuela Gostner	LMGTE Am	332	34th	9th
2021	(Italy) Iron Dames	85	Ferrari 488 GTE Evo	(Belgium) Sarah Bovy (Switzerland) Rahel Frey (Denmark) Michelle Gatting	LMGTE Am	332	36th	9th
2022	(Italy) Iron Dames	85	Ferrari 488 GTE Evo	(Belgium) Sarah Bovy (Switzerland) Rahel Frey (Denmark) Michelle Gatting	LMGTE Am	339	40th	7th
2023	(Italy) Iron Dames	85	Porsche 911 RSR-19	(Belgium) Sarah Bovy (Switzerland) Rahel Frey (Denmark) Michelle Gatting	LMGTE Am	312	30th	4th
2024	(Italy) Iron Dames	85	Lamborghini Huracán GT3 Evo 2	(Belgium) Sarah Bovy (Switzerland) Rahel Frey (Denmark) Michelle Gatting	LMGT3	279	32nd	5th
2025	(Italy) Iron Dames	85	Porsche 911 GT3 R (992)	(Belgium) Sarah Bovy (Switzerland) Rahel Frey (France) Célia Martin	LMGT3	334	48th	16th

=== European Le Mans Series ===
(key) (Races in bold indicate pole position) (Races in italics indicate fastest lap)

Year	Entrant	Drivers	Car	Class	1	2	3	4	5	6	Pos.	Pts
2019	(Switzerland) Kessel Racing	(Switzerland) Rahel Frey (Denmark) Michelle Gatting (Italy) Manuela Gostner	Ferrari 488 GTE (1–2); Ferrari 488 GTE Evo (3–6)	LMGTE	LEC; 2	MNZ; 6	BAR; 4	SIL; 2	SPA; 4	POR; Ret	4th	68
2020	(Italy) Iron Lynx	(Switzerland) Rahel Frey (Denmark) Michelle Gatting (Italy) Manuela Gostner	Ferrari 488 GTE Evo	LMGTE	RIC; 3	SPA; 8	LEC; 3	MNZ; 3	POR; 6		4th	61
2021	(Italy) Iron Lynx	(Belgium) Sarah Bovy (5–6) (Switzerland) Rahel Frey (Denmark) Michelle Gatting (Italy) Manuela Gostner (1–4)	Ferrari 488 GTE Evo	LMGTE	CAT; 4	RBR; NC	LEC; NC	MNZ; 6	SPA; 3	POR; 3	7th	50
2022	(Italy) Iron Lynx	(Belgium) Sarah Bovy (Switzerland) Rahel Frey (1–3) (Denmark) Michelle Gatting (France) Doriane Pin (4–6)	Ferrari 488 GTE Evo	LMGTE	LEC; 4	IMO; 8	MNZ; 5	CAT; Ret	SPA; 2	POR; **1**	3rd	70
2024	(Italy) Iron Dames	(Belgium) Sarah Bovy (Switzerland) Rahel Frey (Denmark) Michelle Gatting	Porsche 911 GT3 R (992)	LMGT3	BAR; **Ret**	LEC; **4**	IMO; **1**	SPA; Ret	MUG; 7	POR; **2**	4th	65
2025	(Italy) Iron Dames	(Belgium) Sarah Bovy (Denmark) Michelle Gatting (France) Célia Martin	Porsche 911 GT3 R (992)	LMGT3	BAR; 1	LEC; 7	IMO; 12	SPA; 4	SIL; 10	POR; 3	4th	62

=== FIA World Endurance Championship ===
(key) (Races in bold indicate pole position) (Races in italics indicate fastest lap)

Year	Entrant	Drivers	Car	Class	1	2	3	4	5	6	7	8	Pos.	Pts
2021	(Italy) Iron Lynx	(Belgium) Sarah Bovy (3–6) (Switzerland) Rahel Frey (Denmark) Michelle Gatting (2–4) (Italy) Manuela Gostner (1–2) (United Kingdom) Katherine Legge (1, 5–6)	Ferrari 488 GTE Evo	LMGTE; Am	SPA; 8	POR; 6	MNZ; 8	LMS; 6	BHR 1; 8	BHR 2; 8			10th	46
2022	(Italy) Iron Dames	(Belgium) Sarah Bovy (1, 3–6) (Switzerland) Rahel Frey (Denmark) Michelle Gatting (1, 3–6) (Denmark) Christina Nielsen (2) (France) Doriane Pin (2)	Ferrari 488 GTE Evo	LMGTE; Am	SEB; 5	SPA; 10	LMS; 6	MNZ; **2**	FUJ; 2	BHR; **3**			3rd	93
2023	(Italy) Iron Dames	(Belgium) Sarah Bovy (Switzerland) Rahel Frey (Denmark) Michelle Gatting	Porsche 911 RSR-19	LMGTE; Am	SEB; **8**	POR; 3	SPA; 5	LMS; 4	MNZ; **5**	FUJ; 4	BHR; **1**		2nd	118
2024	(Italy) Iron Dames	(Belgium) Sarah Bovy (Switzerland) Rahel Frey (3–8) (Denmark) Michelle Gatting (France) Doriane Pin (1–2)	Lamborghini Huracán GT3 Evo 2	LMGT3	QAT; 8	IMO; Ret	SPA; **5**	LMS; 4	SÃO; **Ret**	COA; 13	FUJ; 5	BHR; 10	8th	54
2025	(Italy) Iron Dames	(Switzerland) Rahel Frey (Denmark) Michelle Gatting (France) Célia Martin	Porsche 911 GT3 R (992)	LMGT3	QAT; 13	IMO; 8	SPA; 10	LMS; 16	SÃO; 4	COA; Ret	FUJ; 16	BHR	16th*	19*

* Season in progress.

=== Le Mans Cup ===
(key) (Races in bold indicate pole position) (Races in italics indicate fastest lap)

Year	Entrant	Drivers	Car	Class	1	2	3	4	5	6	7	Pos.	Pts
2021	(Italy) Iron Lynx	(Belgium) Sarah Bovy (1–3) (Italy) Manuela Gostner (4–6) (France) Doriane Pin	Ferrari 488 GT3 Evo 2020	GT3	BAR; DNS	LEC; 2	MNZ; 2	LMS; 1; 2	LMS; 2; 3	SPA; 3	POR; Ret	3rd	67
2024	(Italy) Iron Dames	(Switzerland) Karen Gaillard (France) Célia Martin	Lamborghini Huracán GT3 Evo 2	GT3	BAR; 7	LEC; **2**	LMS; 1; 7	LMS; 2; 16	SPA; 11	MUG; 5	ALG; 7	6th	43
2025	(Italy) Iron Dames	(Spain) Marta García (Belgium) Vanina Ickx	Porsche 911 GT3 R (992)	GT3	BAR; Ret	LEC; 4	LMS; R1; WD	LMS; R2; WD	SPA; 3	SIL; 1	ALG; 5	5th	63

=== IMSA SportsCar Championship ===
(key) (Races in bold indicate pole position) (Races in italics indicate fastest lap)

Year	Entrant	Drivers	Car	Class	1	2	3	4	5	6	7	8	9	10	11	Pos.	Pts
2023	(Italy) Iron Lynx	(Belgium) Sarah Bovy (1–2) (Switzerland) Rahel Frey (1–2, 5, 11) (Denmark) Michelle Gatting (1–2, 5, 11) (France) Doriane Pin (1, 5, 11)	Lamborghini Huracán GT3 Evo 2	GTD	DAY; 18	SEB; 11	LBH	LGA	WGL; 16	MOS	LIM	ELK	VIR	IMS	ATL; 12	19th	770
2024	(Italy) Iron Lynx	(Belgium) Sarah Bovy (1–2, 6, 10–11) (Switzerland) Rahel Frey (1–2, 6, 10–11) (Denmark) Michelle Gatting (1–2, 6, 10–11) (France) Doriane Pin (1)	Lamborghini Huracán GT3 Evo 2	GTD	DAY; 6	SEB; 20	LBH	LGA	WGL; 15	MOS	ELK	VIR	IMS; 18	ATL; 13		21st	918
2025	(Italy) Iron Dames	(Belgium) Sarah Bovy (1–2) (Switzerland) Rahel Frey (1–2) (Denmark) Michelle Gatting (1–2) (Switzerland) Karen Gaillard (1)	Porsche 911 GT3 R (992)	GTD	DAY; 8	SEB; 11	LBH; WD	LGA	WGL	MOS	ELK	VIR	IMS	ATL		20th	471

=== French Rally Championship ===
(key) (Races in bold indicate pole position) (Races in italics indicate fastest lap)

Year	Entrant	Crew	Car	Discipline	1	2	3	4	5	6	7	8	9	Pos.	Pts.
2024	(France) Sarrazin Motorsport – Iron Lynx	(France) Sarah Rumeau (France) Julie Amblard	Ford Fiesta Rally4	Asphalt	TOU; 18	CHA; 12	ANT; 8	VOS; 8	ROU; 5	MBL; 24	CDF; 6	CÉV; 6	VAR; 8	5th	53
2024	(France) Sarrazin Motorsport – Iron Lynx	(France) Sarah Rumeau (France) Julie Amblard	Ford Fiesta Rally4	Gravel	CAU; 7	CDO; 7	ALE; 9	LOZ; 5	CRD; Ret	VAU; 9				6th	38
2025	(France) Sarrazin Motorsport – Iron Lynx	(France) Sarah Rumeau (France) Julie Amblard	Citroën C3 Rally2	Asphalt	TOU; Ret	CHA; Ret	ANT	VOS	ROU	MBL; 15	CDF	CÉV	VAR	94th*	3*
2025	(France) Sarrazin Motorsport – Iron Lynx	(France) Sarah Rumeau (France) Julie Amblard	Citroën C3 Rally2	Gravel	CAU; 4	CDO; 5	ALE; 4	DÉC; 4	LOZ; 5	CRD	VAU			5th*	50.5*

* Season in progress.

=== Asian Le Mans Series ===
(key) (Races in bold indicate pole position) (Races in italics indicate fastest lap)

Year	Entrant	Drivers	Car	Class	1	2	3	4	5	6	Pos.	Pts
2024–25	(Italy) Iron Dames	(Belgium) Sarah Bovy (Denmark) Michelle Gatting (France) Célia Martin	Porsche 911 GT3 R (992)	GT	SEP; 1; 13	SEP; 2; 6	DUB; 1; 15	DUB; 2; 23	ABU; 1; 7	ABU; 2; 13	13th	15

=== WRC2 Championship ===
(key) (Races in bold indicate pole position) (Races in italics indicate fastest lap)

Year	Entrant	Crew	Car	1	2	3	4	5	6	7	8	9	10	11	12	13	14	Pos.	Pts.	
2025	(Italy) Sarrazin Motorsport– Iron Lynx	(France) Sarah Rumeau (France) Julie Amblard	Citroën C3 Rally2	MCO; 9	SWE	KEN	ESP	POR; 17	ITA; RET	GRE; RET	EST	ESP	FIN; 12	PAR	CHI	EUR	JPN	SAU	47th*	2*

* Season in progress.

=== French F4 Championship ===
(key) (Races in bold indicate pole position) (Races in italics indicate fastest lap)

Year	Drivers	1	2	3	4	5	6	7	8	9	10	11	12	13	14	15	16	17	18	Pos.	Pts
2025	(France) Lisa Billard	NOG; 1; 26	NOG; 2; 17	NOG; 3; 11	DIJ; 1; 11	DIJ; 2; 13	DIJ; 3; 23	SPA; 1; 11	SPA; 2; 15	SPA; 3; 9	MAG; 1 RET	MAG; 2; 16	MAG; 3; 16	LÉD; 1; 12	LÉD; 2; 14	LÉD; 3 RET	LMS; 1; 13	LMS; 2; 9	LMS; 3; 11	19th	2

== Former series results ==
=== Ferrari Challenge Europe ===
(key) (Races in bold indicate pole position) (Races in italics indicate fastest lap)

Year	Entrant	Drivers	Class	1	2	3	4	5	6	7	8	9	10	11	12	13	14	Pos.	Pts
2020–21	(Italy) (Switzerland) Iron Lynx – Scuderia Niki Hasler	(Denmark) Michelle Gatting	**TP Pro**	IMO; 1; 2	IMO; 2; 4	BAR; 1	BAR; 2	POR; 1	POR; 2	MUG; 1	MUG; 2	SPA; 1	SPA; 2	MIS1; 1; **1**	MIS1; 2; **2**	MIS2; 1	MIS2; 2	6th	51
2021	(Switzerland) (Italy) Scuderia Niki Hasler – Iron Lynx	(Denmark) Michelle Gatting	**TP Pro**	MNZ; 1; 1	MNZ; 2; 2	RBR; 1; **1**	RBR; 2; **1**	BRN; 1; **2**	BRN; 2; **3**	VAL; 1; 3	VAL; 2; 2	NÜR; 1; **3**	NÜR; 2; 2	SPA; 1; 3	SPA; 2; 6	MUG; 1; 4	MUG; 2; 3	1st	171
2021	(Switzerland) (Italy) Scuderia Niki Hasler – Iron Lynx	(France) Doriane Pin	**TP Pro**	MNZ; 1	MNZ; 2	RBR; 1	RBR; 2	BRN; 1	BRN; 2	VAL; R1	VAL; R2	NÜR; 1	NÜR; 2	SPA; 1	SPA; 2	MUG; 1; 6	MUG; 2; 6	9th	9
2022	(Switzerland) (Italy) Scuderia Niki Hasler – Iron Lynx	(France) Doriane Pin	**TP Pro**	POR; 1; **1**	POR; 2; **1**	LEC; 1; **4**	LEC; 2; 3	BUD; 1; 1	BUD; 2; **1**	HOC; 1; **1**	HOC; 2; **1**	SIL; 1; **1**	SIL; 2; **1**	MUG; 1; **3**	MUG; 2; **3**	IMO; 1; 1	IMO; 2; 2	1st	213

=== Italian F4 Championship ===
Year	Car	Drivers	Races	Wins	Poles	F/Laps	Podiums	Points	D.C.	T.C.
2022	Tatuus F4-T421	(Spain) Maya Weug	20	0	0	0	0	36	14th	5th (Note: Entered as Iron Dames)

† Shared results with other team

==== In detail ====
(key) (Races in bold indicate pole position) (Races in italics indicate fastest lap)

Year	Entrant	Drivers	1	2	3	4	5	6	7	8	9	10	11	12	13	14	15	16	17	18	19	20	21	22	DC	Pts	TC	Pts
2022	(Italy) Iron Dames	(Netherlands) Maya Weug	IMO; 1; 10	IMO; 2; 6	IMO; 3; 28†	MIS; 1; 7	MIS; 2; 11	MIS; 3; 8	SPA; 1; 13	SPA; 2; 10	SPA; 3; 15	VLL; 1; 13	VLL; 2; 11	VLL; 3; 8	RBR; R1	RBR; 2; 7	RBR; 3; 8	RBR; 4; 11	MNZ; 1; 37†	MNZ; 2; 28	MNZ; 3 C	MUG; 1; 14	MUG; 2; 9	MUG; 3; 15	14th	36	5th	36

^{†} Did not finish the race, but was classified.

=== ADAC Formula 4 Championship ===
Year	Car	Drivers	Races	Wins	Poles	F/Laps	Podiums	Points	D.C.	T.C.
2022	Tatuus F4-T421	(Netherlands) Maya Weug	6	0	0	0	0	0	NC†	N/A†

† Ineligible to score points.

==== In detail ====
(key) (Races in bold indicate pole position) (Races in italics indicate fastest lap)

Year	Entrant	Drivers	1	2	3	4	5	6	7	8	9	10	11	12	13	14	15	16	17	18	Pos.	Pts
2022	(Italy) Iron Dames	(Netherlands) Maya Weug	SPA; 1; 16	SPA; 2 Ret	SPA; 3; 18	HOC; 1	HOC; 2	HOC; 3	ZAN; 1; 9	ZAN; 2; 11	ZAN; 3 Ret	NÜR1; 1	NÜR1; 2	NÜR1; 3	LAU; 1	LAU; 2	LAU; 3	NÜR2; 1	NÜR2; 2	NÜR2; 3	IE (Note: Ineligible for championship points as a guest driver.)	–

=== Formula Regional European Championship ===
Year	Car	Drivers	Races	Wins	Poles	F/Laps	Podiums	Points	D.C.	T.C.
2024	Tatuus F3 T-318	(France) Doriane Pin	15	0	0	0	0	0	27th	11th
2024	Tatuus F3 T-318	(Spain) Marta García	20	0	0	0	0	0	28th	11th

==== In detail ====
(key) (Races in bold indicate pole position) (Races in italics indicate fastest lap)

Year	Entrant	Drivers	1	2	3	4	5	6	7	8	9	10	11	12	13	14	15	16	17	18	19	20	DC	Pts	TC	Pts
2024	(Italy) Iron Dames	(France) Doriane Pin	HOC; 1; 23	HOC; 2; 23	SPA; 1; 22	SPA; 2 WD	ZAN; 1	ZAN; 2	BUD; 1	BUD; 2	MUG; 1; 26	MUG; 2; 24	LEC; 1 Ret	LEC; 2; 13	IMO; 1; 25	IMO; 2 Ret	SPI; 1; 17	SPI; 2; 17	BAR; 1; 24	BAR; 2; 20	MNZ; 1; 21	MNZ; 2; 25	27th	0	11th	0
2024	(Italy) Iron Dames	(Spain) Marta García	HOC; 1; 24	HOC; 2; 25	SPA; 1; 21	SPA; 2; 15	ZAN; 1; 24	ZAN; 2; 22	BUD; 1; 21	BUD; 2 Ret	MUG; 1; 31	MUG; 2; 27	LEC; 1; 18	LEC; 2; 20	IMO; 1; 23	IMO; 2; 17	RBR; 1; 23	RBR; 2; 14	BAR; 1; 29	BAR; 2; 24	MNZ; 1; 20	MNZ; 2; 24	28th	0	11th	0

=== Ligier European Series ===
(key) (Races in bold indicate pole position) (Races in italics indicate fastest lap)

Year	Entrant	Drivers	Class	1	2	3	4	5	6	7	8	9	10	11	Pos.	Pts
2024	(Italy) Iron Dames by M Racing	(Spain) Marta García	JS2 R	BAR; 1	BAR; 2	LEC; 1	LEC; 2	LMS	SPA; 1; 5	SPA; 2; 1	MUG; 1	MUG; 2	ALG; 1; 7	ALG; 2; 1	IE	–
2024	(Italy) Iron Dames by M Racing	(Spain) Natalia Granada	JS2 R	BAR; 1	BAR; 2	LEC; 1	LEC; 2	LMS	SPA; 1	SPA; 2	MUG; 1; 7	MUG; 2 Ret	POR; 1	POR; 2	IE	–
