= 2025 FIA World Endurance Championship =

Auto racing series

- Organizer: Automobile Club de l'Ouest
- Discipline: Sports car endurance racing
- Races: 8

Champions
- Hypercar Manufacturer: (Italy) Ferrari
- Hypercar Team: (Italy) AF Corse
- LMGT3 Team: (Germany) Manthey 1st Phorm

FIA World Endurance Championship
- ← 2024 2026 →

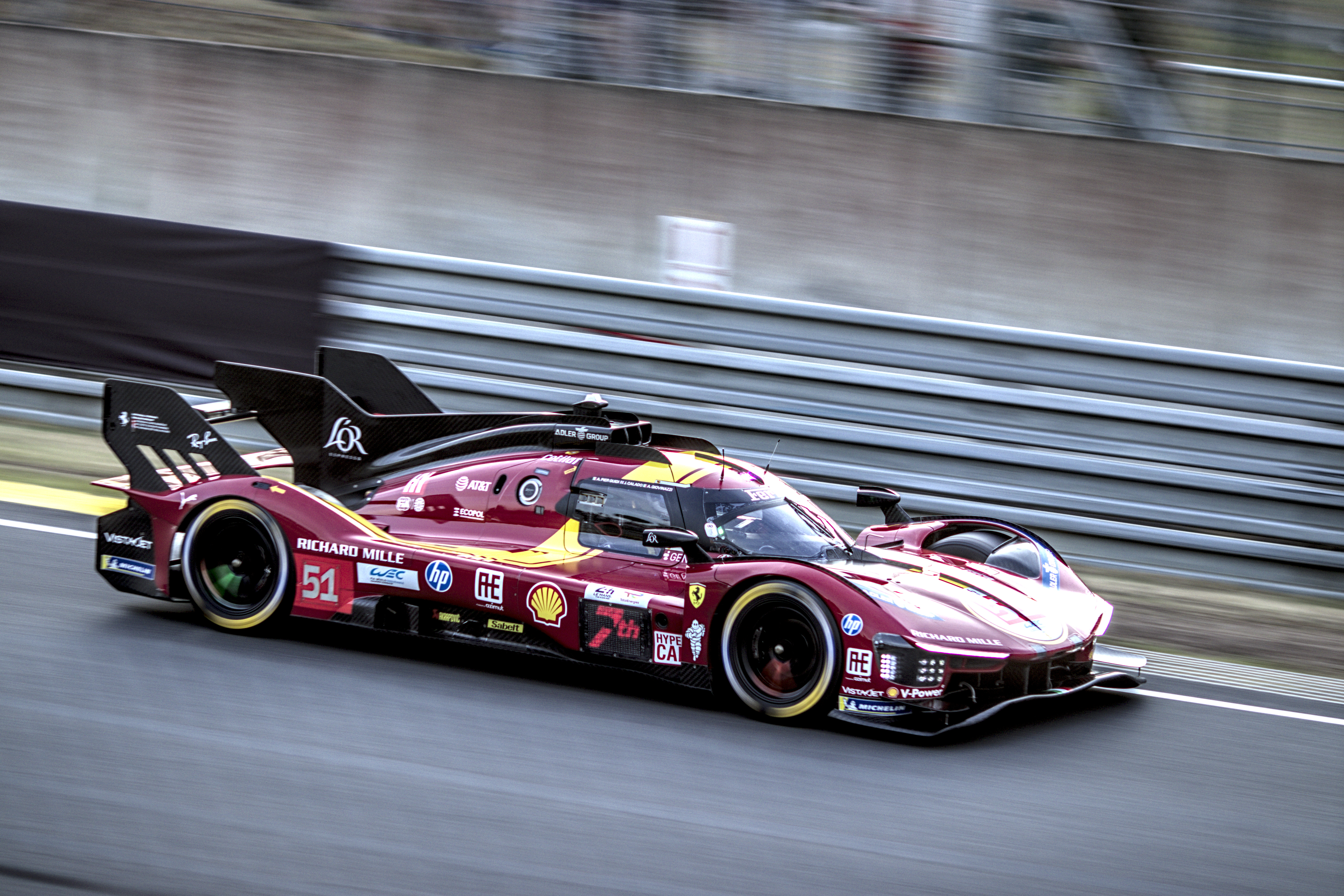
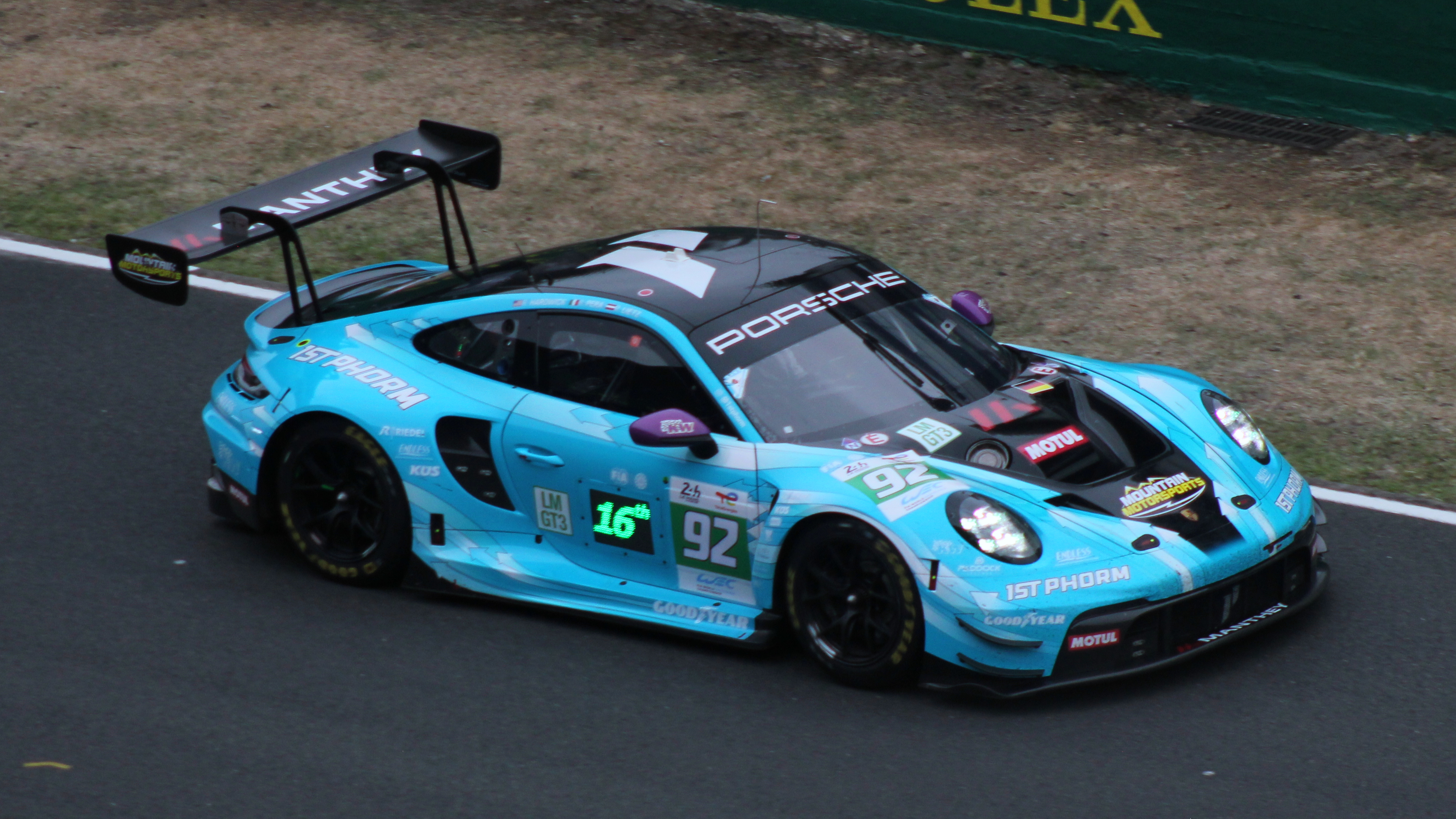
The drivers of the No. 51 AF Corse Ferrari are the Hypercar World Endurance Drivers' Champions, with Ferrari also taking the Manufacturers' Championship. The No. 92 Porsche of Manthey 1st Phorm are the LMGT3 Endurance Trophy winners.

The 2025 FIA World Endurance Championship was the thirteenth season of the FIA World Endurance Championship, a sports car racing series organised by the Fédération Internationale de l'Automobile (FIA) and the Automobile Club de l'Ouest (ACO). The series was open to Hypercars (built under Le Mans Hypercar (LMH) or Le Mans Daytona h (LMDh) regulations) and LMGT3 racing cars.

From this season onwards, manufacturers are required to field at least two cars in the Hypercar class to be allowed to participate. The same rule is already enforced in the LMGT3 category. Additionally, in the LMGT3 class the Bronze-rated driver is obligated to take part in Qualifying session, with the Silver-rated driver participating in the Hyperpole session. Furthermore, the maximum grid size for this season has been increased from 37 to 40, to accommodate the increase in entries by Hypercar manufacturers who fielded only one car in the 2024 World Endurance Championship.

== Calendar ==
The calendar was announced on 14 June 2024, during the 2024 24 Hours of Le Mans weekend. The calendar was unchanged from 2024, with the Imola Circuit featuring on the calendar until at least 2028, with the circuit committing to building additional pit garages. The 6 Hours of Fuji marked the 100th race of the World Endurance Championship since its inaugural race at the 12 Hours of Sebring in 2012.

Locations of the 2025 races

Rnd	Race	Circuit	Location	Date
	Prologue	Losail International Circuit	(Qatar) Lusail	21/22 February
1	Qatar 1812 km	Losail International Circuit	(Qatar) Lusail	28 February
2	6 Hours of Imola	Imola Circuit	(Italy) Imola	20 April
3	6 Hours of Spa-Francorchamps	Circuit de Spa-Francorchamps	(Belgium) Stavelot	10 May
4	24 Hours of Le Mans	Circuit de la Sarthe	(France) Le Mans	14–15 June
5	6 Hours of São Paulo	Interlagos Circuit	(Brazil) São Paulo	13 July
6	Lone Star Le Mans	Circuit of the Americas	(United States) Austin, Texas	7 September
7	6 Hours of Fuji	Fuji Speedway	(Japan) Oyama, Shizuoka	28 September
8	8 Hours of Bahrain	Bahrain International Circuit	(Bahrain) Sakhir	8 November

== Entries ==
=== Hypercar ===
Racing in the FIA World Cup for Hypercar Teams

Entrant	Car	Engine	Hybrid	Tyre	No.	Drivers	Rounds
(United States) Aston Martin THOR Team	Aston Martin Valkyrie	Aston Martin RA 6.5 L V12		M	007	(United Kingdom) Tom Gamble	All
(United States) Aston Martin THOR Team	Aston Martin Valkyrie	Aston Martin RA 6.5 L V12		M	007	(United Kingdom) Harry Tincknell	All
(United States) Aston Martin THOR Team	Aston Martin Valkyrie	Aston Martin RA 6.5 L V12		M	007	(United Kingdom) Ross Gunn	1, 4, 8
(United States) Aston Martin THOR Team	Aston Martin Valkyrie	Aston Martin RA 6.5 L V12		M	009	(Spain) Alex Riberas	All
(United States) Aston Martin THOR Team	Aston Martin Valkyrie	Aston Martin RA 6.5 L V12		M	009	(Denmark) Marco Sørensen	All
(United States) Aston Martin THOR Team	Aston Martin Valkyrie	Aston Martin RA 6.5 L V12		M	009	(Canada) Roman De Angelis	1, 4, 8
(Germany) Porsche Penske Motorsport	Porsche 963	Porsche 9RD 4.6 L Turbo V8	Hybrid	M	5	(France) Julien Andlauer	All
(Germany) Porsche Penske Motorsport	Porsche 963	Porsche 9RD 4.6 L Turbo V8	Hybrid	M	5	(Denmark) Michael Christensen	1–6
(Germany) Porsche Penske Motorsport	Porsche 963	Porsche 9RD 4.6 L Turbo V8	Hybrid	M	5	(France) Mathieu Jaminet	1–2, 4, 6–8
(Germany) Porsche Penske Motorsport	Porsche 963	Porsche 9RD 4.6 L Turbo V8	Hybrid	M	5	(Switzerland) Nico Müller	3
(Germany) Porsche Penske Motorsport	Porsche 963	Porsche 9RD 4.6 L Turbo V8	Hybrid	M	5	(Germany) Laurin Heinrich	8
(Germany) Porsche Penske Motorsport	Porsche 963	Porsche 9RD 4.6 L Turbo V8	Hybrid	M	6	(France) Kévin Estre	All
(Germany) Porsche Penske Motorsport	Porsche 963	Porsche 9RD 4.6 L Turbo V8	Hybrid	M	6	(Belgium) Laurens Vanthoor	All
(Germany) Porsche Penske Motorsport	Porsche 963	Porsche 9RD 4.6 L Turbo V8	Hybrid	M	6	(Australia) Matt Campbell	1–2, 4, 6, 8
(Germany) Porsche Penske Motorsport	Porsche 963	Porsche 9RD 4.6 L Turbo V8	Hybrid	M	6	(Germany) Pascal Wehrlein	3
(Japan) Toyota Gazoo Racing	Toyota GR010 Hybrid	Toyota H8909 3.5 L Turbo V6	Hybrid	M	7	(Japan) Kamui Kobayashi	All
(Japan) Toyota Gazoo Racing	Toyota GR010 Hybrid	Toyota H8909 3.5 L Turbo V6	Hybrid	M	7	(Netherlands) Nyck de Vries	All
(Japan) Toyota Gazoo Racing	Toyota GR010 Hybrid	Toyota H8909 3.5 L Turbo V6	Hybrid	M	7	(United Kingdom) Mike Conway	1–5, 7–8
(Japan) Toyota Gazoo Racing	Toyota GR010 Hybrid	Toyota H8909 3.5 L Turbo V6	Hybrid	M	7	(Argentina) José María López	6
(Japan) Toyota Gazoo Racing	Toyota GR010 Hybrid	Toyota H8909 3.5 L Turbo V6	Hybrid	M	8	(New Zealand) Brendon Hartley	All
(Japan) Toyota Gazoo Racing	Toyota GR010 Hybrid	Toyota H8909 3.5 L Turbo V6	Hybrid	M	8	(Japan) Ryō Hirakawa	All
(Japan) Toyota Gazoo Racing	Toyota GR010 Hybrid	Toyota H8909 3.5 L Turbo V6	Hybrid	M	8	(Switzerland) Sébastien Buemi	1–4, 6–8
(United States) Cadillac Hertz Team Jota	Cadillac V-Series.R	Cadillac LMC55R 5.5 L V8	Hybrid	M	12	(United Kingdom) Alex Lynn	All
(United States) Cadillac Hertz Team Jota	Cadillac V-Series.R	Cadillac LMC55R 5.5 L V8	Hybrid	M	12	(France) Norman Nato	All
(United States) Cadillac Hertz Team Jota	Cadillac V-Series.R	Cadillac LMC55R 5.5 L V8	Hybrid	M	12	(United Kingdom) Will Stevens	All
(United States) Cadillac Hertz Team Jota	Cadillac V-Series.R	Cadillac LMC55R 5.5 L V8	Hybrid	M	38	(New Zealand) Earl Bamber	All
(United States) Cadillac Hertz Team Jota	Cadillac V-Series.R	Cadillac LMC55R 5.5 L V8	Hybrid	M	38	(France) Sébastien Bourdais	All
(United States) Cadillac Hertz Team Jota	Cadillac V-Series.R	Cadillac LMC55R 5.5 L V8	Hybrid	M	38	(United Kingdom) Jenson Button	All
(Germany) BMW M Team WRT	BMW M Hybrid V8	BMW P66/3 4.0 L Turbo V8	Hybrid	M	15	(Denmark) Kevin Magnussen	All
(Germany) BMW M Team WRT	BMW M Hybrid V8	BMW P66/3 4.0 L Turbo V8	Hybrid	M	15	(Switzerland) Raffaele Marciello	All
(Germany) BMW M Team WRT	BMW M Hybrid V8	BMW P66/3 4.0 L Turbo V8	Hybrid	M	15	(Belgium) Dries Vanthoor	1–2, 4–8
(Germany) BMW M Team WRT	BMW M Hybrid V8	BMW P66/3 4.0 L Turbo V8	Hybrid	M	20	(Germany) René Rast	All
(Germany) BMW M Team WRT	BMW M Hybrid V8	BMW P66/3 4.0 L Turbo V8	Hybrid	M	20	(Netherlands) Robin Frijns	1–4, 6–8
(Germany) BMW M Team WRT	BMW M Hybrid V8	BMW P66/3 4.0 L Turbo V8	Hybrid	M	20	(South Africa) Sheldon van der Linde	1–2, 4–8
(Germany) BMW M Team WRT	BMW M Hybrid V8	BMW P66/3 4.0 L Turbo V8	Hybrid	M	20	(Germany) Marco Wittmann	5
(France) Alpine Endurance Team	Alpine A424	Alpine V634 3.4 L Turbo V6	Hybrid	M	35	(France) Paul-Loup Chatin	All
(France) Alpine Endurance Team	Alpine A424	Alpine V634 3.4 L Turbo V6	Hybrid	M	35	(Austria) Ferdinand Habsburg	All
(France) Alpine Endurance Team	Alpine A424	Alpine V634 3.4 L Turbo V6	Hybrid	M	35	(France) Charles Milesi	All
(France) Alpine Endurance Team	Alpine A424	Alpine V634 3.4 L Turbo V6	Hybrid	M	36	(France) Jules Gounon	All
(France) Alpine Endurance Team	Alpine A424	Alpine V634 3.4 L Turbo V6	Hybrid	M	36	(France) Frédéric Makowiecki	All
(France) Alpine Endurance Team	Alpine A424	Alpine V634 3.4 L Turbo V6	Hybrid	M	36	(Germany) Mick Schumacher	All
(Italy) Ferrari AF Corse	Ferrari 499P	Ferrari F163CG 3.0 L Turbo V6	Hybrid	M	50	(Italy) Antonio Fuoco	All
(Italy) Ferrari AF Corse	Ferrari 499P	Ferrari F163CG 3.0 L Turbo V6	Hybrid	M	50	(Spain) Miguel Molina	All
(Italy) Ferrari AF Corse	Ferrari 499P	Ferrari F163CG 3.0 L Turbo V6	Hybrid	M	50	(Denmark) Nicklas Nielsen	All
(Italy) Ferrari AF Corse	Ferrari 499P	Ferrari F163CG 3.0 L Turbo V6	Hybrid	M	51	(United Kingdom) James Calado	All
(Italy) Ferrari AF Corse	Ferrari 499P	Ferrari F163CG 3.0 L Turbo V6	Hybrid	M	51	(Italy) Antonio Giovinazzi	All
(Italy) Ferrari AF Corse	Ferrari 499P	Ferrari F163CG 3.0 L Turbo V6	Hybrid	M	51	(Italy) Alessandro Pier Guidi	All
(Italy) AF Corse	Ferrari 499P	Ferrari F163CG 3.0 L Turbo V6	Hybrid	M	83	(United Kingdom) Phil Hanson	All
(Italy) AF Corse	Ferrari 499P	Ferrari F163CG 3.0 L Turbo V6	Hybrid	M	83	(Poland) Robert Kubica	All
(Italy) AF Corse	Ferrari 499P	Ferrari F163CG 3.0 L Turbo V6	Hybrid	M	83	(China) Yifei Ye	All
(France) Peugeot TotalEnergies	Peugeot 9X8	Peugeot X6H 2.6 L Turbo V6	Hybrid	M	93	(United Kingdom) Paul di Resta	All
(France) Peugeot TotalEnergies	Peugeot 9X8	Peugeot X6H 2.6 L Turbo V6	Hybrid	M	93	(Denmark) Mikkel Jensen	All
(France) Peugeot TotalEnergies	Peugeot 9X8	Peugeot X6H 2.6 L Turbo V6	Hybrid	M	93	(France) Jean-Éric Vergne	1–4, 6–8
(France) Peugeot TotalEnergies	Peugeot 9X8	Peugeot X6H 2.6 L Turbo V6	Hybrid	M	94	(France) Loïc Duval	All
(France) Peugeot TotalEnergies	Peugeot 9X8	Peugeot X6H 2.6 L Turbo V6	Hybrid	M	94	(Denmark) Malthe Jakobsen	All
(France) Peugeot TotalEnergies	Peugeot 9X8	Peugeot X6H 2.6 L Turbo V6	Hybrid	M	94	(Belgium) Stoffel Vandoorne	1–4, 6–7
(France) Peugeot TotalEnergies	Peugeot 9X8	Peugeot X6H 2.6 L Turbo V6	Hybrid	M	94	(France) Théo Pourchaire	8
(Germany) Proton Competition	Porsche 963	Porsche 9RD 4.6 L Turbo V8	Hybrid	M	99	(Switzerland) Neel Jani	All
(Germany) Proton Competition	Porsche 963	Porsche 9RD 4.6 L Turbo V8	Hybrid	M	99	(Chile) Nico Pino	All
(Germany) Proton Competition	Porsche 963	Porsche 9RD 4.6 L Turbo V8	Hybrid	M	99	(Argentina) Nicolás Varrone	All

Hypercar team changes
- Having pulled out midway through the 2024 season, Isotta Fraschini did not return to the series.
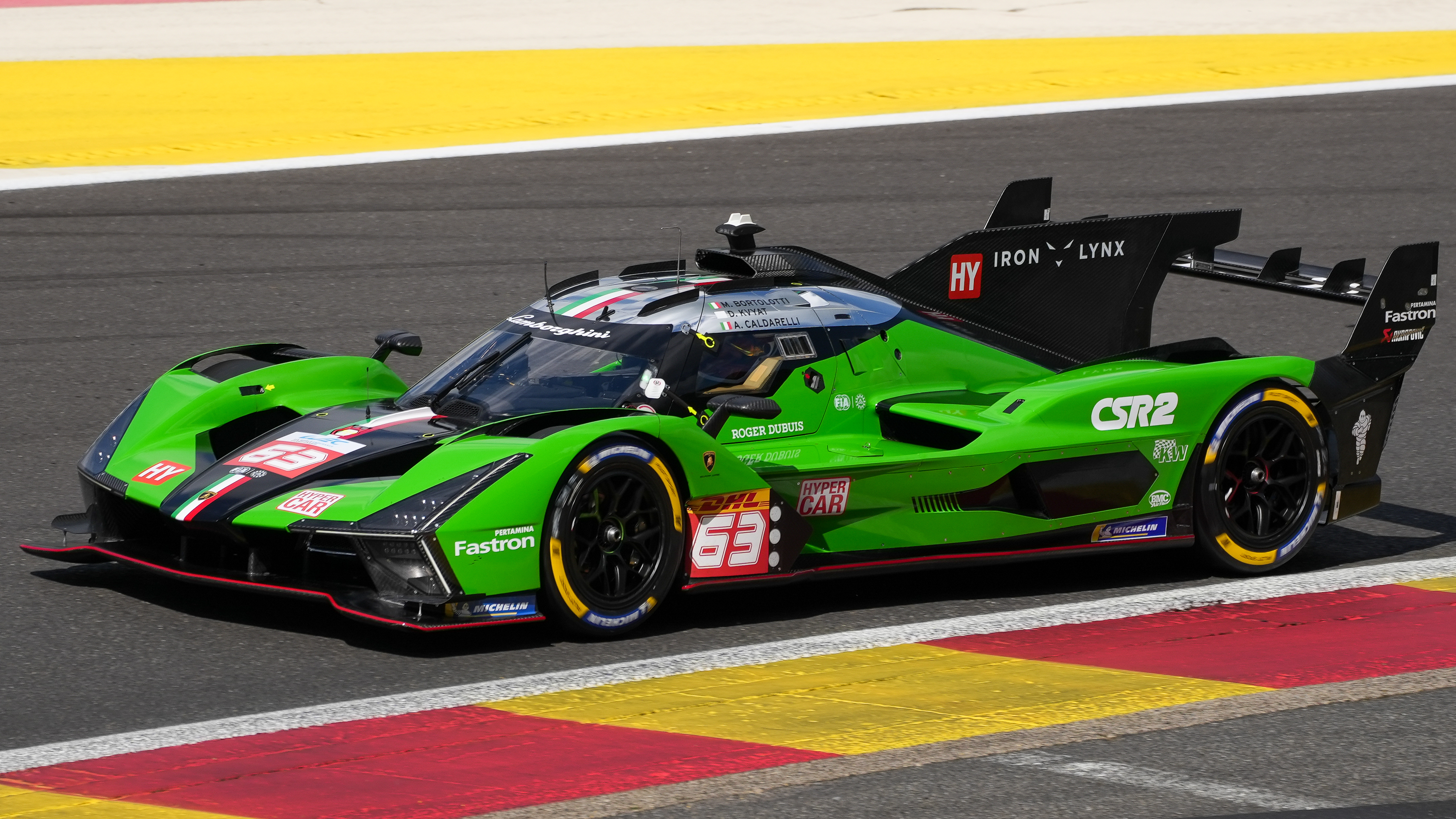
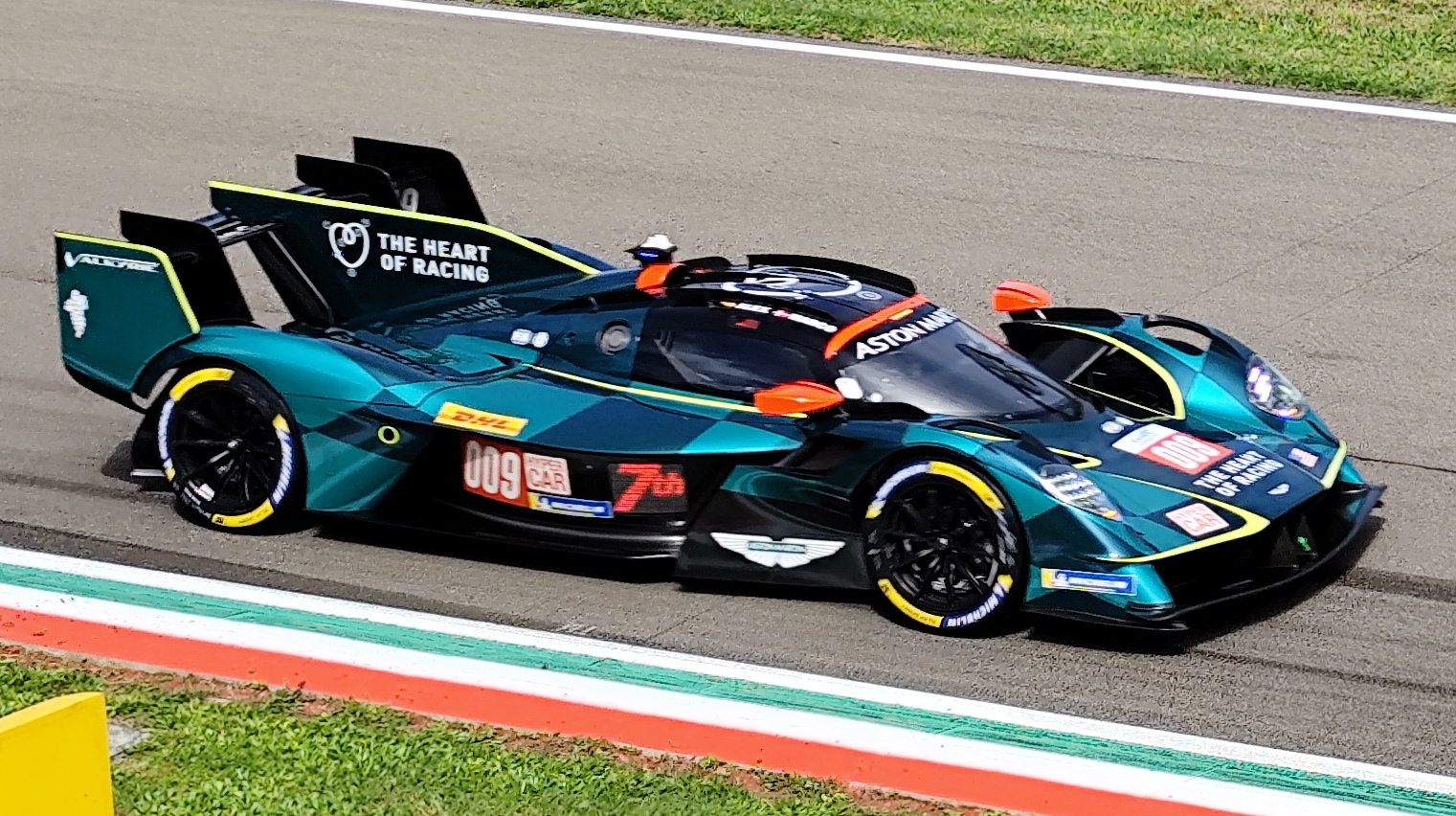
  Lamborghini (left) left WEC after one season, as Aston Martin (right) joined the Hypercar grid.
- Lamborghini exited WEC after a single year amid a breakdown in relations with service provider Iron Lynx. Riley Motorsports will run the car instead for a reduced IMSA endurance-only program.
- Five years after withdrawing its early commitment to the Hypercar formula, Aston Martin entered the class with a modified, non-hybrid version of its Valkyrie. The car, operated by The Heart of Racing (THOR) and Multimatic, was the first sports prototype by the British brand since the AMR-One LMP1.
- Chip Ganassi Racing and General Motors parted ways at the end of 2024, with Porsche customer Jota Sport moving over to run Cadillac's factory programme. The American marque doubled up to align with a new rule requiring manufacturers to enter a minimum of two cars.
Hypercar driver changes
- Aston Martin THOR Team recruited two-time LMGTE Pro world champion Marco Sørensen, Multimatic factory driver Harry Tincknell (who raced for Proton the previous year), McLaren man Tom Gamble, and promoted Alex Riberas from Heart of Racing's GT ranks. IMSA full-season pairing Ross Gunn and Roman De Angelis complemented the team at the longer races.
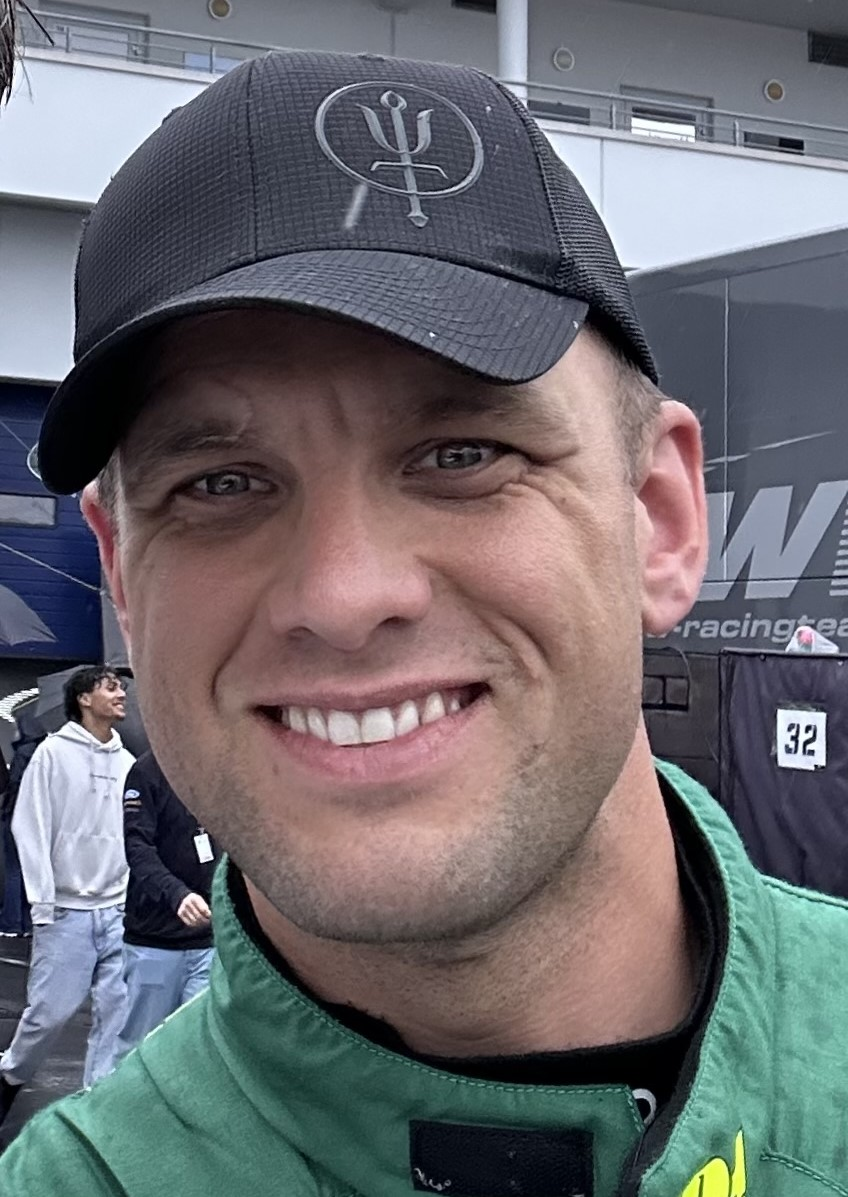
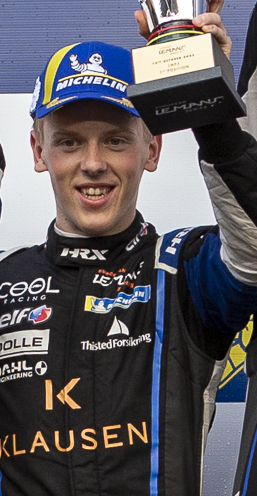
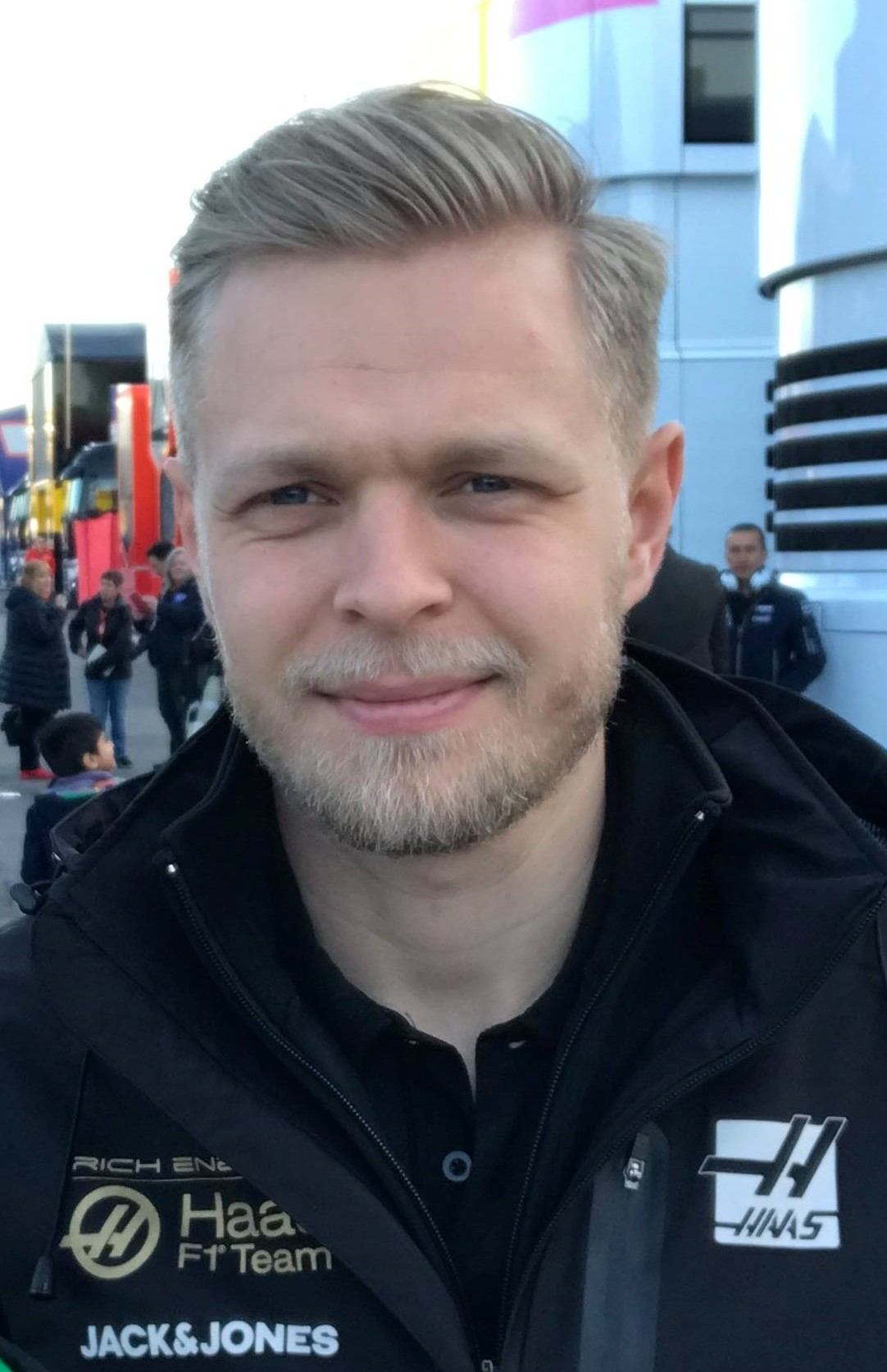
  Denmark's Marco Sørensen (left), Malthe Jakobsen (centre) and Kevin Magnussen (right) all made their Hypercar debut in 2025.
- Porsche Penske Motorsport reshuffled and downsized its lineup, as Matt Campbell returned to IMSA, reigning champion André Lotterer was dropped and Proton's Julien Andlauer was signed to replace Alpine-bound Frédéric Makowiecki. Campbell and Mathieu Jaminet rounded out the crews at selected races.
- Jenson Button, Norman Nato and Will Stevens followed Hertz Team Jota in its link-up with Cadillac, and were joined by incumbent works drivers Earl Bamber, Sébastien Bourdais and Alex Lynn.
- Jota's Callum Ilott and AF Corse's Robert Shwartzman both left the series to lead Prema Racing's new IndyCar Series project. The latter was replaced at AF Corse by former Jota driver Phil Hanson. Oliver Rasmussen in turn migrated to Super Formula with Team Impul.
- Ex-Formula One driver Kevin Magnussen, who had backed out of his Peugeot contract in 2022 to race for Haas, finally made his Hypercar debut with BMW M Team WRT. He replaced Marco Wittmann, who moved to IMSA on a full-time basis.
- Alpine Endurance Team hired Frédéric Makowiecki from Porsche following Nicolas Lapierre's retirement. Reserve driver Jules Gounon stepped up to a race seat, swapping roles with Matthieu Vaxivière.
- Nico Müller departed Peugeot TotalEnergies to join Andretti's Formula E team and Porsche's works driver pool. Paul di Resta moved back to the #93 car, as reserve driver Malthe Jakobsen was promoted to a race seat in the #94. Peugeot subsequently signed 2023 Formula 2 champion Théo Pourchaire for test and development duties.
- In the wake of Andlauer and Tincknell's exits, Proton Competition completed its trio with a pair of South American youngsters: Nico Pino, a podium finisher in LMP2 and LMGT3, and Corvette factory driver Nicolás Varrone, who won the final GTE Am title in 2023.
  Mid-season changes
- Nico Müller and reigning Formula E champion Pascal Wehrlein joined Porsche Penske for the 6 Hours of Spa, filling in for Mathieu Jaminet and Matt Campbell respectively. The clash with IMSA's Laguna Seca race also ruled out BMW M Team WRT's Dries Vanthoor and Sheldon van der Linde.
- Sébastien Buemi, Robin Frijns, Jean-Éric Vergne and Stoffel Vandoorne all missed the São Paulo round due to their Formula E commitments at the clashing 2025 Berlin ePrix. Peugeot TotalEnergies and Toyota Gazoo Racing opted to run two drivers, while Marco Wittmann covered for Frijns at BMW.
- Mike Conway was forced to miss Lone Star Le Mans after injuring his collarbone in a training accident. Toyota again called for the services of Lexus LMGT3 driver José María López.
- Michael Christensen skipped the round at Fuji to test for AO Racing in preparation for October's Petit Le Mans. He was replaced by Mathieu Jaminet. Christensen also skipped the season finale in Bahrain, as Porsche handed IMSA GTD Pro champion Laurin Heinrich his Hypercar debut.
- Stoffel Vandoorne stepped down from his Peugeot duties early, with reserve driver Théo Pourchaire handed a race seat for the season finale in Bahrain and beyond.

=== LMGT3 ===
Entrant	Car	Engine	Tyre	No.	Drivers	Rounds
(France) Racing Spirit of Léman	Aston Martin Vantage AMR GT3 Evo	Aston Martin M177 4.0 L Turbo V8	G	10	(Brazil) Eduardo Barrichello	All
(France) Racing Spirit of Léman	Aston Martin Vantage AMR GT3 Evo	Aston Martin M177 4.0 L Turbo V8	G	10	(France) Valentin Hasse-Clot	All
(France) Racing Spirit of Léman	Aston Martin Vantage AMR GT3 Evo	Aston Martin M177 4.0 L Turbo V8	G	10	(United States) Derek DeBoer	1–4, 6
(France) Racing Spirit of Léman	Aston Martin Vantage AMR GT3 Evo	Aston Martin M177 4.0 L Turbo V8	G	10	(United States) Anthony McIntosh	5, 7–8
(United States) Heart of Racing Team	Aston Martin Vantage AMR GT3 Evo	Aston Martin M177 4.0 L Turbo V8	G	27	(Italy) Mattia Drudi	All
(United States) Heart of Racing Team	Aston Martin Vantage AMR GT3 Evo	Aston Martin M177 4.0 L Turbo V8	G	27	(United Kingdom) Ian James	All
(United States) Heart of Racing Team	Aston Martin Vantage AMR GT3 Evo	Aston Martin M177 4.0 L Turbo V8	G	27	(Canada) Zacharie Robichon	All
(Italy) Vista AF Corse	Ferrari 296 GT3	Ferrari F163CE 3.0 L Turbo V6	G	21	(France) François Hériau	All
(Italy) Vista AF Corse	Ferrari 296 GT3	Ferrari F163CE 3.0 L Turbo V6	G	21	(United States) Simon Mann	All
(Italy) Vista AF Corse	Ferrari 296 GT3	Ferrari F163CE 3.0 L Turbo V6	G	21	(Italy) Alessio Rovera	All
(Italy) Vista AF Corse	Ferrari 296 GT3	Ferrari F163CE 3.0 L Turbo V6	G	54	(Italy) Francesco Castellacci	All
(Italy) Vista AF Corse	Ferrari 296 GT3	Ferrari F163CE 3.0 L Turbo V6	G	54	(Switzerland) Thomas Flohr	All
(Italy) Vista AF Corse	Ferrari 296 GT3	Ferrari F163CE 3.0 L Turbo V6	G	54	(Italy) Davide Rigon	All
(Belgium) The Bend Team WRT	BMW M4 GT3 Evo	BMW P58 3.0 L Turbo I6	G	31	(Brazil) Augusto Farfus	All
(Belgium) The Bend Team WRT	BMW M4 GT3 Evo	BMW P58 3.0 L Turbo I6	G	31	(Australia) Yasser Shahin	All
(Belgium) The Bend Team WRT	BMW M4 GT3 Evo	BMW P58 3.0 L Turbo I6	G	31	Timur Boguslavskiy (Note: Boguslavskiy is Russian, but he competes as a neutral competitor as Russian national emblems were banned by the FIA following the Russian invasion of Ukraine.)	1–4, 6–8
(Belgium) The Bend Team WRT	BMW M4 GT3 Evo	BMW P58 3.0 L Turbo I6	G	31	(Brazil) Pedro Ebrahim	5
(Belgium) Team WRT	BMW M4 GT3 Evo	BMW P58 3.0 L Turbo I6	G	46	(Oman) Ahmad Al Harthy	All
(Belgium) Team WRT	BMW M4 GT3 Evo	BMW P58 3.0 L Turbo I6	G	46	(Italy) Valentino Rossi	All
(Belgium) Team WRT	BMW M4 GT3 Evo	BMW P58 3.0 L Turbo I6	G	46	(South Africa) Kelvin van der Linde	All
(United Kingdom) TF Sport	Chevrolet Corvette Z06 GT3.R	Chevrolet LT6.R 5.5 L V8	G	33	(United Kingdom) Jonny Edgar	All
(United Kingdom) TF Sport	Chevrolet Corvette Z06 GT3.R	Chevrolet LT6.R 5.5 L V8	G	33	(Spain) Daniel Juncadella	All
(United Kingdom) TF Sport	Chevrolet Corvette Z06 GT3.R	Chevrolet LT6.R 5.5 L V8	G	33	(United States) Ben Keating	All
(United Kingdom) TF Sport	Chevrolet Corvette Z06 GT3.R	Chevrolet LT6.R 5.5 L V8	G	81	(Angola) Rui Andrade	All
(United Kingdom) TF Sport	Chevrolet Corvette Z06 GT3.R	Chevrolet LT6.R 5.5 L V8	G	81	(Republic of Ireland) Charlie Eastwood	All
(United Kingdom) TF Sport	Chevrolet Corvette Z06 GT3.R	Chevrolet LT6.R 5.5 L V8	G	81	(Belgium) Tom Van Rompuy	All
(United Kingdom) United Autosports	McLaren 720S GT3 Evo	McLaren M840T 4.0 L Turbo V8	G	59	(France) Sébastien Baud	All
(United Kingdom) United Autosports	McLaren 720S GT3 Evo	McLaren M840T 4.0 L Turbo V8	G	59	(United Kingdom) James Cottingham	All
(United Kingdom) United Autosports	McLaren 720S GT3 Evo	McLaren M840T 4.0 L Turbo V8	G	59	(Switzerland) Grégoire Saucy	All
(United Kingdom) United Autosports	McLaren 720S GT3 Evo	McLaren M840T 4.0 L Turbo V8	G	95	(Indonesia) Sean Gelael	All
(United Kingdom) United Autosports	McLaren 720S GT3 Evo	McLaren M840T 4.0 L Turbo V8	G	95	(United Kingdom) Darren Leung	All
(United Kingdom) United Autosports	McLaren 720S GT3 Evo	McLaren M840T 4.0 L Turbo V8	G	95	(Japan) Marino Sato	All
(Italy) Iron Lynx	Mercedes-AMG GT3 Evo	Mercedes-AMG M159 6.2 L V8	G	60	(Italy) Matteo Cairoli	1–3
(Italy) Iron Lynx	Mercedes-AMG GT3 Evo	Mercedes-AMG M159 6.2 L V8	G	60	(Italy) Matteo Cressoni	1–2
(Italy) Iron Lynx	Mercedes-AMG GT3 Evo	Mercedes-AMG M159 6.2 L V8	G	60	(Italy) Claudio Schiavoni	1–2
(Italy) Iron Lynx	Mercedes-AMG GT3 Evo	Mercedes-AMG M159 6.2 L V8	G	60	(Australia) Brenton Grove	3
(Italy) Iron Lynx	Mercedes-AMG GT3 Evo	Mercedes-AMG M159 6.2 L V8	G	60	(Australia) Stephen Grove	3
(Italy) Iron Lynx	Mercedes-AMG GT3 Evo	Mercedes-AMG M159 6.2 L V8	G	60	(United Kingdom) Andrew Gilbert	4–8
(Italy) Iron Lynx	Mercedes-AMG GT3 Evo	Mercedes-AMG M159 6.2 L V8	G	60	(United Kingdom) Lorcan Hanafin	4–8
(Italy) Iron Lynx	Mercedes-AMG GT3 Evo	Mercedes-AMG M159 6.2 L V8	G	60	(Spain) Fran Rueda	4–8
(Italy) Iron Lynx	Mercedes-AMG GT3 Evo	Mercedes-AMG M159 6.2 L V8	G	61	(Netherlands) Lin Hodenius	All
(Italy) Iron Lynx	Mercedes-AMG GT3 Evo	Mercedes-AMG M159 6.2 L V8	G	61	(Belgium) Maxime Martin	All
(Italy) Iron Lynx	Mercedes-AMG GT3 Evo	Mercedes-AMG M159 6.2 L V8	G	61	(Germany) Christian Ried	1–2
(Italy) Iron Lynx	Mercedes-AMG GT3 Evo	Mercedes-AMG M159 6.2 L V8	G	61	(Australia) Martin Berry	3–8
(Germany) Proton Competition	Ford Mustang GT3	Ford Coyote 5.4 L V8	G	77	(United Kingdom) Ben Barker	All
(Germany) Proton Competition	Ford Mustang GT3	Ford Coyote 5.4 L V8	G	77	(Portugal) Bernardo Sousa	All
(Germany) Proton Competition	Ford Mustang GT3	Ford Coyote 5.4 L V8	G	77	(United Kingdom) Ben Tuck	All
(Germany) Proton Competition	Ford Mustang GT3	Ford Coyote 5.4 L V8	G	88	(Italy) Stefano Gattuso	All
(Germany) Proton Competition	Ford Mustang GT3	Ford Coyote 5.4 L V8	G	88	(Italy) Giammarco Levorato	All
(Germany) Proton Competition	Ford Mustang GT3	Ford Coyote 5.4 L V8	G	88	(Norway) Dennis Olsen	All
(France) Akkodis ASP Team	Lexus RC F GT3	Lexus 2UR-GSE 5.4 L V8	G	78	(Germany) Finn Gehrsitz	All
(France) Akkodis ASP Team	Lexus RC F GT3	Lexus 2UR-GSE 5.4 L V8	G	78	(France) Arnold Robin	All
(France) Akkodis ASP Team	Lexus RC F GT3	Lexus 2UR-GSE 5.4 L V8	G	78	(United Kingdom) Ben Barnicoat	1, 6–8
(France) Akkodis ASP Team	Lexus RC F GT3	Lexus 2UR-GSE 5.4 L V8	G	78	(France) Esteban Masson	2
(France) Akkodis ASP Team	Lexus RC F GT3	Lexus 2UR-GSE 5.4 L V8	G	78	(Japan) Yuichi Nakayama	3, 5
(France) Akkodis ASP Team	Lexus RC F GT3	Lexus 2UR-GSE 5.4 L V8	G	78	(United Kingdom) Jack Hawksworth	4
(France) Akkodis ASP Team	Lexus RC F GT3	Lexus 2UR-GSE 5.4 L V8	G	87	(Austria) Clemens Schmid	All
(France) Akkodis ASP Team	Lexus RC F GT3	Lexus 2UR-GSE 5.4 L V8	G	87	(Romania) Petru Umbrărescu	All
(France) Akkodis ASP Team	Lexus RC F GT3	Lexus 2UR-GSE 5.4 L V8	G	87	(Argentina) José María López	1–5, 7–8
(France) Akkodis ASP Team	Lexus RC F GT3	Lexus 2UR-GSE 5.4 L V8	G	87	(United Kingdom) Jack Hawksworth	6
(Italy) Iron Dames	Porsche 911 GT3 R (992)	Porsche M97/80 4.2 L Flat-6	G	85	(Switzerland) Rahel Frey	All
(Italy) Iron Dames	Porsche 911 GT3 R (992)	Porsche M97/80 4.2 L Flat-6	G	85	(France) Célia Martin	All
(Italy) Iron Dames	Porsche 911 GT3 R (992)	Porsche M97/80 4.2 L Flat-6	G	85	(Denmark) Michelle Gatting	1–3, 5–8
(Italy) Iron Dames	Porsche 911 GT3 R (992)	Porsche M97/80 4.2 L Flat-6	G	85	(Belgium) Sarah Bovy	4
(Germany) Manthey 1st Phorm	Porsche 911 GT3 R (992)	Porsche M97/80 4.2 L Flat-6	G	92	(United States) Ryan Hardwick	All
(Germany) Manthey 1st Phorm	Porsche 911 GT3 R (992)	Porsche M97/80 4.2 L Flat-6	G	92	(Austria) Richard Lietz	All
(Germany) Manthey 1st Phorm	Porsche 911 GT3 R (992)	Porsche M97/80 4.2 L Flat-6	G	92	(Italy) Riccardo Pera	All

LMGT3 team changes
- The LMGT3 category's colour code changed from orange to green, last used by LMGTE Pro in 2022.
- French-Swiss team Racing Spirit of Léman, based nearby the namesake lake, made its series debut replacing D'station Racing as the second of Aston Martin's Prodrive-run customers.
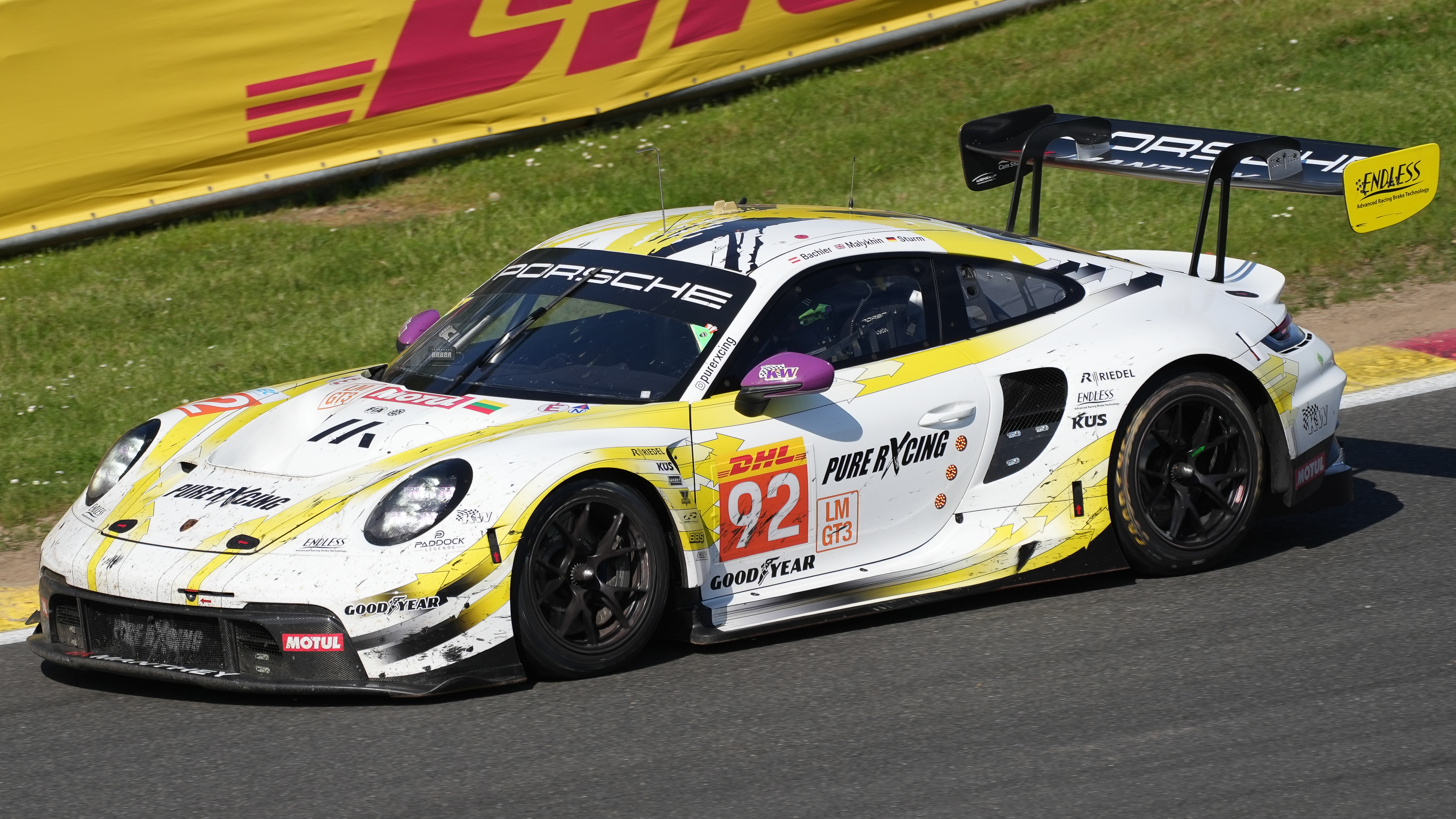
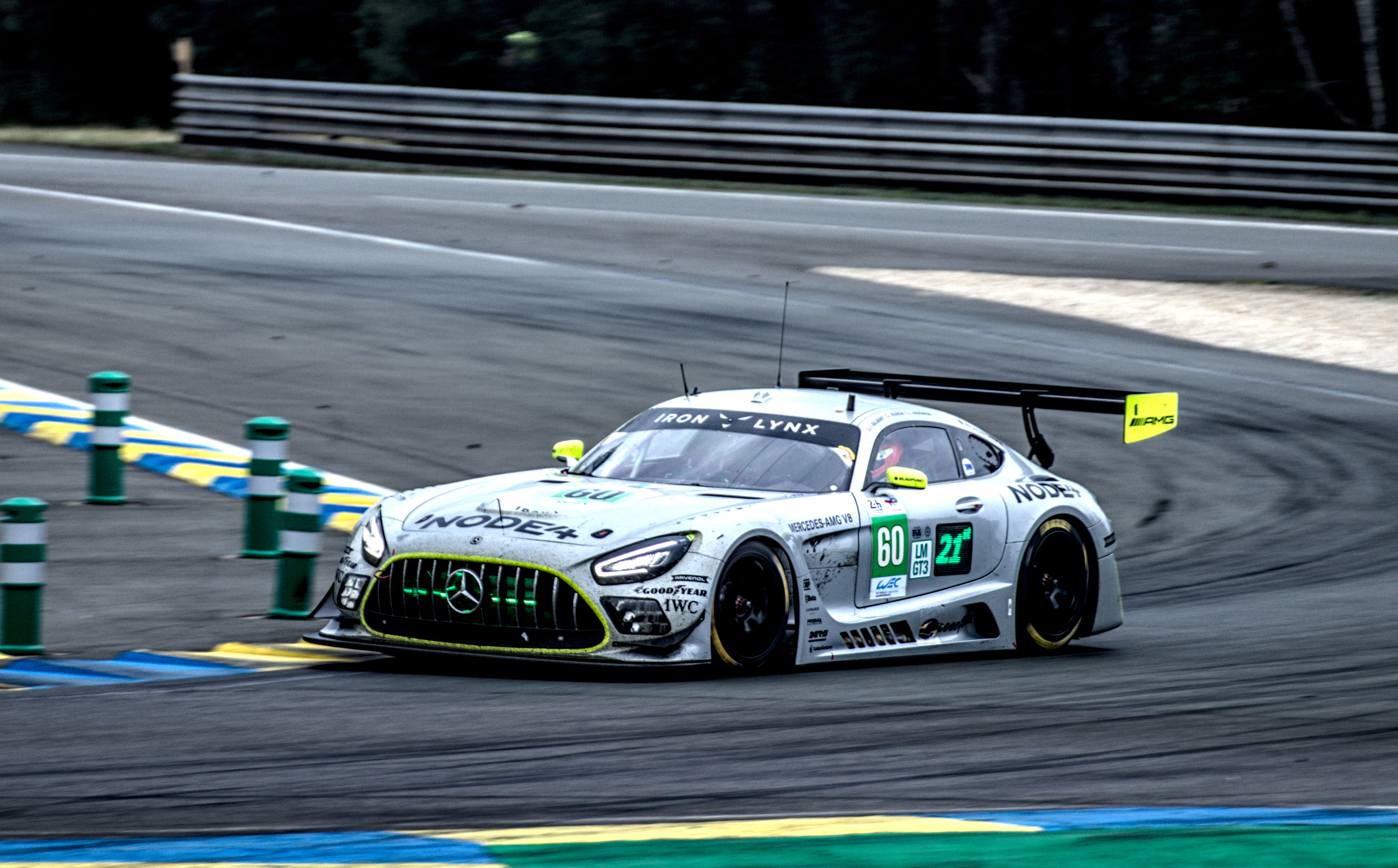
  Pure Rxcing (left) did not defend its LMGT3 Endurance Trophy, while Mercedes-AMG (right) made its WEC debut with Iron Lynx.
- In the wake of Lamborghini's full-scale exit from WEC, Iron Lynx partnered up with Mercedes-AMG to field a pair of Mercedes-AMG GT3 Evos. The tie-up marked the German manufacturer's WEC debut, and also Iron Lynx's fourth brand affiliation in as many years.
- Iron Dames did not follow its parent team to Mercedes, instead opting to rejoin the Porsche fold with Manthey Racing. Reigning champion Pure Rxcing did not defend its title and switched focus to LMP2.

== Results and standings ==
=== Race results ===
The highest finishing competitor entered in the World Endurance Championship is listed below. Invitational entries may have finished ahead of WEC competitors in individual races.

Rnd.	Circuit	Hypercar winners	LMGT3 winners	Report
1	(Qatar) Losail	(Italy) No. 50 Ferrari AF Corse	(United Kingdom) No. 33 TF Sport	Report
1	(Qatar) Losail	(Italy) Antonio Fuoco (Spain) Miguel Molina (Denmark) Nicklas Nielsen	(United Kingdom) Jonny Edgar (Spain) Daniel Juncadella (United States) Ben Keating	Report
2	(Italy) Imola	(Italy) No. 51 Ferrari AF Corse	(Germany) No. 92 Manthey 1st Phorm	Report
2	(Italy) Imola	(United Kingdom) James Calado (Italy) Antonio Giovinazzi (Italy) Alessandro Pier Guidi	(United States) Ryan Hardwick (Austria) Richard Lietz (Italy) Riccardo Pera	Report
3	(Belgium) Spa	(Italy) No. 51 Ferrari AF Corse	(Italy) No. 21 Vista AF Corse	Report
3	(Belgium) Spa	(United Kingdom) James Calado (Italy) Antonio Giovinazzi (Italy) Alessandro Pier Guidi	(France) François Hériau (United States) Simon Mann (Italy) Alessio Rovera	Report
4	(France) Le Mans	(Italy) No. 83 AF Corse	(Germany) No. 92 Manthey 1st Phorm	Report
4	(France) Le Mans	(United Kingdom) Phil Hanson (Poland) Robert Kubica (China) Yifei Ye	(United States) Ryan Hardwick (Austria) Richard Lietz (Italy) Riccardo Pera	Report
5	(Brazil) São Paulo	(United States) No. 12 Cadillac Hertz Team Jota	(France) No. 87 Akkodis ASP Team	Report
5	(Brazil) São Paulo	(United Kingdom) Alex Lynn (France) Norman Nato (United Kingdom) Will Stevens	(Argentina) José María López (Austria) Clemens Schmid (Romania) Petru Umbrărescu	Report
6	(United States) Austin	(Germany) No. 6 Porsche Penske Motorsport	(United Kingdom) No. 95 United Autosports	Report
6	(United States) Austin	(France) Kevin Estre (Belgium) Laurens Vanthoor (Australia) Matt Campbell	(Indonesia) Sean Gelael (United Kingdom) Darren Leung (Japan) Marino Sato	Report
7	(Japan) Fuji	(France) No. 35 Alpine Endurance Team	(United Kingdom) No. 81 TF Sport	Report
7	(Japan) Fuji	(France) Paul-Loup Chatin (Austria) Ferdinand Habsburg (France) Charles Milesi	(Angola) Rui Andrade (Republic of Ireland) Charlie Eastwood (Belgium) Tom Van Rompuy	Report
8	Bahrain	(Japan) No. 7 Toyota Gazoo Racing	(France) No. 87 Akkodis ASP Team	Report
8	Bahrain	(United Kingdom) Mike Conway (Japan) Kamui Kobayashi (Netherlands) Nyck de Vries	(Argentina) José María López (Austria) Clemens Schmid (Romania) Petru Umbrărescu	Report

=== Drivers' championships ===
An FIA World Championship is awarded to the winning drivers in the Hypercar category. An FIA Endurance Trophy is awarded to the winning drivers in the LMGT3 category.

Points systems
Duration	1st	2nd	3rd	4th	5th	6th	7th	8th	9th	10th	Pole
6 Hours	25	18	15	12	10	8	6	4	2	1	**1**
8–10 Hours	38	27	23	18	15	12	9	6	3	2	**1**
24 Hours	50	36	30	24	20	16	12	8	4	2	**1**

==== Hypercar World Endurance Drivers' Championship ====
Pos.	Driver	Team	QAT (Qatar)	IMO (Italy)	SPA (Belgium)	LMS (France)	SÃO (Brazil)	COA (United States)	FUJ (Japan)	BHR (Bahrain)	Points
1	(United Kingdom) James Calado	(Italy) Ferrari AF Corse	**3**	**1**	1	3	11	5	15	4	133
1	(Italy) Antonio Giovinazzi	(Italy) Ferrari AF Corse	**3**	**1**	1	3	11	5	15	4	133
1	(Italy) Alessandro Pier Guidi	(Italy) Ferrari AF Corse	**3**	**1**	1	3	11	5	15	4	133
2	(United Kingdom) Phil Hanson	(Italy) AF Corse	2	4	15	1	8	**7**	9	5	117
2	(Poland) Robert Kubica	(Italy) AF Corse	2	4	15	1	8	**7**	9	5	117
2	(China) Yifei Ye	(Italy) AF Corse	2	4	15	1	8	**7**	9	5	117
3	(Italy) Antonio Fuoco	(Italy) Ferrari AF Corse	1	15	**2**	DSQ	12	2	12	3	98
3	(Spain) Miguel Molina	(Italy) Ferrari AF Corse	1	15	**2**	DSQ	12	2	12	3	98
3	(Denmark) Nicklas Nielsen	(Italy) Ferrari AF Corse	1	15	**2**	DSQ	12	2	12	3	98
4	(France) Kévin Estre	(Germany) Porsche Penske Motorsport	11	8	9	2	4	1	3	13	94
4	(Belgium) Laurens Vanthoor	(Germany) Porsche Penske Motorsport	11	8	9	2	4	1	3	13	94
5	(United Kingdom) Alex Lynn	(United States) Cadillac Hertz Team Jota	8	10	5	**4**	**1**	8	**6**	6	93
5	(France) Norman Nato	(United States) Cadillac Hertz Team Jota	8	10	5	**4**	**1**	8	**6**	6	93
5	(United Kingdom) Will Stevens	(United States) Cadillac Hertz Team Jota	8	10	5	**4**	**1**	8	**6**	6	93
6	(Japan) Kamui Kobayashi	(Japan) Toyota Gazoo Racing	6	7	7	5	14	14	7	**1**	89
6	(Netherlands) Nyck de Vries	(Japan) Toyota Gazoo Racing	6	7	7	5	14	14	7	**1**	89
6	(United Kingdom) Mike Conway	(Japan) Toyota Gazoo Racing	6	7	7	5	14		7	**1**	89
7	(New Zealand) Brendon Hartley	(Japan) Toyota Gazoo Racing	5	5	4	14	15	9	16	2	66
7	(Japan) Ryō Hirakawa	(Japan) Toyota Gazoo Racing	5	5	4	14	15	9	16	2	66
7	(Switzerland) Sébastien Buemi	(Japan) Toyota Gazoo Racing	5	5	4	14		9	16	2	66
8	(Australia) Matt Campbell	(Germany) Porsche Penske Motorsport	11	8		2		1		13	65
9	(Germany) René Rast	(Germany) BMW M Team WRT	7	2	Ret	16	5	Ret	8	8	47
9	(South Africa) Sheldon van der Linde	(Germany) BMW M Team WRT	7	2		16	5	Ret	8	8	47
10	(New Zealand) Earl Bamber	(United States) Cadillac Hertz Team Jota	16	16	6	7	2	6	13	16	46
10	(France) Sébastien Bourdais	(United States) Cadillac Hertz Team Jota	16	16	6	7	2	6	13	16	46
10	(United Kingdom) Jenson Button	(United States) Cadillac Hertz Team Jota	16	16	6	7	2	6	13	16	46
11	(France) Julien Andlauer	(Germany) Porsche Penske Motorsport	10	11	12	6	3	10	4	14	46
12	(United Kingdom) Paul di Resta	(France) Peugeot TotalEnergies	9	9	11	15	7	4	2	9	44
12	(Denmark) Mikkel Jensen	(France) Peugeot TotalEnergies	9	9	11	15	7	4	2	9	44
13	(France) Jean-Éric Vergne	(France) Peugeot TotalEnergies	9	9	11	15		4	2	9	38
14	(France) Paul-Loup Chatin	(France) Alpine Endurance Team	14	13	8	8	18	11	1	11	37
14	(Austria) Ferdinand Habsburg	(France) Alpine Endurance Team	14	13	8	8	18	11	1	11	37
14	(France) Charles Milesi	(France) Alpine Endurance Team	14	13	8	8	18	11	1	11	37
15	(Netherlands) Robin Frijns	(Germany) BMW M Team WRT	7	2	Ret	16		Ret	8	8	37
16	(France) Jules Gounon	(France) Alpine Endurance Team	13	3	3	9	9	15	14	12	36
16	(France) Frédéric Makowiecki	(France) Alpine Endurance Team	13	3	3	9	9	15	14	12	36
16	(Germany) Mick Schumacher	(France) Alpine Endurance Team	13	3	3	9	9	15	14	12	36
17	(Denmark) Michael Christensen	(Germany) Porsche Penske Motorsport	10	11	12	6	3	10			34
18	(France) Mathieu Jaminet	(Germany) Porsche Penske Motorsport	10	11		6		10	4	14	31
19	(France) Loïc Duval	(France) Peugeot TotalEnergies	12	12	Ret	10	6	3	10	10	28
19	(Denmark) Malthe Jakobsen	(France) Peugeot TotalEnergies	12	12	Ret	10	6	3	10	10	28
20	(Denmark) Kevin Magnussen	(Germany) BMW M Team WRT	4	6	10	17	17	12	Ret	Ret	27
20	(Switzerland) Raffaele Marciello	(Germany) BMW M Team WRT	4	6	10	17	17	12	Ret	Ret	27
21	(Belgium) Dries Vanthoor	(Germany) BMW M Team WRT	4	6		17	17	12	Ret	Ret	26
22	(Spain) Alex Riberas	(United States) Aston Martin THOR Team	17	17	14	11	13	Ret	5	7	19
22	(Denmark) Marco Sørensen	(United States) Aston Martin THOR Team	17	17	14	11	13	Ret	5	7	19
23	(Belgium) Stoffel Vandoorne	(France) Peugeot TotalEnergies	12	12	Ret	10		3	10		18
24	(Germany) Marco Wittmann	(Germany) BMW M Team WRT					5				10
25	(Germany) Pascal Wehrlein	(Germany) Porsche Penske Motorsport			9						2
26	(France) Théo Pourchaire	(France) Peugeot TotalEnergies								10	2
27	(Switzerland) Neel Jani	(Germany) Proton Competition	15	14	Ret	12	10	13	11	17	1
27	(Chile) Nico Pino	(Germany) Proton Competition	15	14	Ret	12	10	13	11	17	1
27	(Argentina) Nicolás Varrone	(Germany) Proton Competition	15	14	Ret	12	10	13	11	17	1
28	(Canada) Roman De Angelis	(United States) Aston Martin THOR Team	17			11				7 (Note: De Angelis did not fulfil his mandated minimum drive time at the 8 Hours of Bahrain, meaning that he did not receive points for the event.)	0
29	(Switzerland) Nico Müller	(Germany) Porsche Penske Motorsport			12						0
30	(United Kingdom) Tom Gamble	(United States) Aston Martin THOR Team	Ret	18	13	13	16	Ret	Ret	15	0
30	(United Kingdom) Harry Tincknell	(United States) Aston Martin THOR Team	Ret	18	13	13	16	Ret	Ret	15	0
31	(United Kingdom) Ross Gunn	(United States) Aston Martin THOR Team	Ret			13				15	0
32	(Argentina) José María López	(Japan) Toyota Gazoo Racing						14			0
33	(Germany) Laurin Heinrich	(Germany) Porsche Penske Motorsport								14	0
Pos.	Driver	Team	QAT (Qatar)	IMO (Italy)	SPA (Belgium)	LMS (France)	SÃO (Brazil)	COA (United States)	FUJ (Japan)	BHR (Bahrain)	Points

Colour	Result
Gold	Winner
Silver	Second place
Bronze	Third place
Green	Points classification
Blue	Non-points classification
Blue	Non-classified finish (NC)
Purple	Retired, not classified (Ret)
Red	Did not qualify (DNQ)
Red	Did not pre-qualify (DNPQ)
Black	Disqualified (DSQ)
White	Did not start (DNS)
White	Withdrew (WD)
White	Race cancelled (C)
Blank	Did not practice (DNP)
Blank	Did not arrive (DNA)
Blank	Excluded (EX)

**Bold** - Pole position

==== FIA Endurance Trophy for LMGT3 Drivers ====
Pos.	Driver	Team	QAT (Qatar)	IMO (Italy)	SPA (Belgium)	LMS (France)	SÃO (Brazil)	COA (United States)	FUJ (Japan)	BHR (Bahrain)	Points
1	(United States) Ryan Hardwick	(Germany) Manthey 1st Phorm	12	1	7	1	6	7	5	4	123
1	(Austria) Richard Lietz	(Germany) Manthey 1st Phorm	12	1	7	1	6	7	5	4	123
1	(Italy) Riccardo Pera	(Germany) Manthey 1st Phorm	12	1	7	1	6	7	5	4	123
2	(France) François Hériau	(Italy) Vista AF Corse	5	Ret	1	2	13	12	2	5	109
2	(United States) Simon Mann	(Italy) Vista AF Corse	5	Ret	1	2	13	12	2	5	109
2	(Italy) Alessio Rovera	(Italy) Vista AF Corse	5	Ret	1	2	13	12	2	5	109
3	(Austria) Clemens Schmid	(France) Akkodis ASP Team	Ret	4	Ret	5	1	Ret	15	1	95
3	(Romania) Petru Umbrărescu	(France) Akkodis ASP Team	Ret	4	Ret	5	1	Ret	15	1	95
3	(Argentina) José María López	(France) Akkodis ASP Team	Ret	4	Ret	5	1		15	1	95
4	(Italy) Mattia Drudi	(United States) Heart of Racing Team	6	Ret	5	**4**	14	5	7	3	86
4	(United Kingdom) Ian James	(United States) Heart of Racing Team	6	Ret	5	**4**	14	5	7	3	86
4	(Canada) Zacharie Robichon	(United States) Heart of Racing Team	6	Ret	5	**4**	14	5	7	3	86
5	(Angola) Rui Andrade	(United Kingdom) TF Sport	Ret	6	14	3	2	13	1	11	81
5	(Republic of Ireland) Charlie Eastwood	(United Kingdom) TF Sport	Ret	6	14	3	2	13	1	11	81
5	(Belgium) Tom Van Rompuy	(United Kingdom) TF Sport	Ret	6	14	3	2	13	1	11	81
6	(United Kingdom) Jonny Edgar	(United Kingdom) TF Sport	1	7	13	6	7	Ret	11	6	78
6	(Spain) Daniel Juncadella	(United Kingdom) TF Sport	1	7	13	6	7	Ret	11	6	78
6	(United States) Ben Keating	(United Kingdom) TF Sport	1	7	13	6	7	Ret	11	6	78
7	(Italy) Francesco Castellacci	(Italy) Vista AF Corse	8	5	3	Ret	11	3	6	Ret	54
7	(Switzerland) Thomas Flohr	(Italy) Vista AF Corse	8	5	3	Ret	11	3	6	Ret	54
7	(Italy) Davide Rigon	(Italy) Vista AF Corse	8	5	3	Ret	11	3	6	Ret	54
8	(Oman) Ahmad Al Harthy	(Belgium) Team WRT	11	**2**	9	Ret	10	2	4	15	52
8	(Italy) Valentino Rossi	(Belgium) Team WRT	11	**2**	9	Ret	10	2	4	15	52
8	(South Africa) Kelvin van der Linde	(Belgium) Team WRT	11	**2**	9	Ret	10	2	4	15	52
9	(Germany) Finn Gehrsitz	(France) Akkodis ASP Team	4	3	**8**	Ret	5	14	9	**Ret**	51
9	(France) Arnold Robin	(France) Akkodis ASP Team	4	3	**8**	Ret	5	14	9	**Ret**	51
10	(Brazil) Augusto Farfus	(Belgium) The Bend Team WRT	3	12	Ret	Ret	12	9	3	7	49
10	(Australia) Yasser Shahin	(Belgium) The Bend Team WRT	3	12	Ret	Ret	12	9	3	7	49
10	Timur Boguslavskiy	(Belgium) The Bend Team WRT	3	12	Ret	Ret		9	3	7	49
11	(Indonesia) Sean Gelael	(United Kingdom) United Autosports	**7**	9	Ret	Ret	9	1	10	9	43
11	(United Kingdom) Darren Leung	(United Kingdom) United Autosports	**7**	9	Ret	Ret	9	1	10	9	43
11	(Japan) Marino Sato	(United Kingdom) United Autosports	**7**	9	Ret	Ret	9	1	10	9	43
12	(France) Sébastien Baud	(United Kingdom) United Autosports	2	14	15	Ret	8	4	14	16	43
12	(United Kingdom) James Cottingham	(United Kingdom) United Autosports	2	14	15	Ret	8	4	14	16	43
12	(Switzerland) Grégoire Saucy	(United Kingdom) United Autosports	2	14	15	Ret	8	4	14	16	43
13	(Netherlands) Lin Hodenius	(Italy) Iron Lynx	Ret	13	11	8	Ret	Ret	8	2	39
13	(Belgium) Maxime Martin	(Italy) Iron Lynx	Ret	13	11	8	Ret	Ret	8	2	39
13	(Australia) Martin Berry	(Italy) Iron Lynx			11	8	Ret	Ret	8	2	39
14	(United Kingdom) Benjamin Barker	(Germany) Proton Competition	Ret	10	4	7	Ret	6	12	8	39
14	(Portugal) Bernardo Sousa	(Germany) Proton Competition	Ret	10	4	7	Ret	6	12	8	39
14	(United Kingdom) Ben Tuck	(Germany) Proton Competition	Ret	10	4	7	Ret	6	12	8	39
15	(Brazil) Eduardo Barrichello	(France) Racing Spirit of Léman	9	11	6	9	**3**	11	**17**	14	32
15	(France) Valentin Hasse-Clot	(France) Racing Spirit of Léman	9	11	6	9	**3**	11	**17**	14	32
16	(Italy) Stefano Gattuso	(Germany) Proton Competition	10	16	2	Ret	Ret	**8**	Ret	10	27
16	(Italy) Giammarco Levorato	(Germany) Proton Competition	10	16	2	Ret	Ret	**8**	Ret	10	27
16	(Norway) Dennis Olsen	(Germany) Proton Competition	10	16	2	Ret	Ret	**8**	Ret	10	27
17	(United Kingdom) Ben Barnicoat	(France) Akkodis ASP Team	4					14	9	**Ret**	21
18	(Switzerland) Rahel Frey	(Italy) Iron Dames	13	8	10	10	4	Ret	13	12	19
18	(France) Célia Martin	(Italy) Iron Dames	13	8	10	10	4	Ret	13	12	19
19	(United States) Anthony McIntosh	(France) Racing Spirit of Léman					**3**		**17**	14	17
20	(Denmark) Michelle Gatting	(Italy) Iron Dames	13	8	10		4	Ret	13	12	17
21	(France) Esteban Masson	(France) Akkodis ASP Team		3							15
22	(Japan) Yuichi Nakayama	(France) Akkodis ASP Team			**8**		5				15
23	(United States) Derek DeBoer	(France) Racing Spirit of Léman	9	11	6	9		11			15
24	(Belgium) Sarah Bovy	(Italy) Iron Dames				10					2
25	(United Kingdom) Andrew Gilbert	(Italy) Iron Lynx				Ret	15	10	16	13	1
25	(United Kingdom) Lorcan Hanafin	(Italy) Iron Lynx				Ret	15	10	16	13	1
25	(Spain) Fran Rueda	(Italy) Iron Lynx				Ret	15	10	16	13	1
26	(Italy) Matteo Cairoli	(Italy) Iron Lynx	NC	15	12						0
27	(Australia) Brenton Grove	(Italy) Iron Lynx			12						0
27	(Australia) Stephen Grove	(Italy) Iron Lynx			12						0
28	(Brazil) Pedro Ebrahim	(Belgium) The Bend Team WRT					12				0
29	(Germany) Christian Ried	(Italy) Iron Lynx	Ret	13							0
30	(Italy) Matteo Cressoni	(Italy) Iron Lynx	NC	15							0
30	(Italy) Claudio Schiavoni	(Italy) Iron Lynx	NC	15							0
31	(United Kingdom) Jack Hawksworth	(France) Akkodis ASP Team				Ret		Ret			0
Pos.	Driver	Team	QAT (Qatar)	IMO (Italy)	SPA (Belgium)	LMS (France)	SÃO (Brazil)	COA (United States)	FUJ (Japan)	BHR (Bahrain)	Points

=== Manufacturers' and teams' championships ===
A world championship will be awarded for Hypercar manufacturers. An FIA World Cup will be awarded for customer Hypercar class teams. An FIA Endurance Trophy will be awarded to LMGT3 teams.

==== Hypercar World Endurance Manufacturers' Championship ====
Points are awarded only to the two highest finishing competitors from each manufacturer. Privateer entries are made invisible.

Pos.	Manufacturer	QAT (Qatar)	IMO (Italy)	SPA (Belgium)	LMS (France)	SÃO (Brazil)	COA (United States)	FUJ (Japan)	BHR (Bahrain)	Points
1	(Italy) Ferrari	1	**1**	**1**	2	9	2	10	3	245
1	(Italy) Ferrari	**2**	13	2	DSQ	10	5	13	4	245
2	(Japan) Toyota	4	4	4	4	12	8	7	**1**	171
2	(Japan) Toyota	5	6	7	12	13	12	14	2	171
3	(Germany) Porsche	9	7	9	1	3	1	3	12	165
3	(Germany) Porsche	10	10	12	5	4	9	4	13	165
4	(United States) Cadillac	7	9	5	**3**	**1**	6	**6**	5	158
4	(United States) Cadillac	14	14	6	6	2	7	11	15	158
5	(Germany) BMW	3	2	10	14	5	11	8	7	87
5	(Germany) BMW	6	5	Ret	15	15	Ret	Ret	Ret	87
6	(France) Alpine	12	3	3	7	8	10	1	10	86
6	(France) Alpine	13	12	8	8	16	13	12	11	86
7	(France) Peugeot	8	8	11	9	6	3	2	8	84
7	(France) Peugeot	11	11	Ret	13	7	4	9	9	84
8	(United Kingdom) Aston Martin	15	15	13	10	11	Ret	5	6	24
8	(United Kingdom) Aston Martin	Ret	16	14	11	14	Ret	Ret	14	24
Pos.	Manufacturer	QAT (Qatar)	IMO (Italy)	SPA (Belgium)	LMS (France)	SÃO (Brazil)	COA (United States)	FUJ (Japan)	BHR (Bahrain)	Points

==== FIA World Cup for Hypercar Teams ====
Pos.	Car	Team	QAT (Qatar)	IMO (Italy)	SPA (Belgium)	LMS (France)	SÃO (Brazil)	COA (United States)	FUJ (Japan)	BHR (Bahrain)	Points
1	83	(Italy) AF Corse	1	1	1	1	1	**1**	1	1	252
2	99	(Germany) Proton Competition	2	2	Ret	2	2	2	2	2	162
Pos.	Car	Team	QAT (Qatar)	IMO (Italy)	SPA (Belgium)	LMS (France)	SÃO (Brazil)	COA (United States)	FUJ (Japan)	BHR (Bahrain)	Points

==== FIA Endurance Trophy for LMGT3 Teams ====
Pos.	Car	Team	QAT (Qatar)	IMO (Italy)	SPA (Belgium)	LMS (France)	SÃO (Brazil)	COA (United States)	FUJ (Japan)	BHR (Bahrain)	Points
1	92	(Germany) Manthey 1st Phorm	12	1	7	1	6	7	5	4	123
2	21	(Italy) Vista AF Corse	5	Ret	1	2	13	12	2	5	109
3	87	(France) Akkodis ASP Team	Ret	4	Ret	5	1	Ret	15	1	95
4	27	(United States) Heart of Racing Team	6	Ret	5	**4**	14	5	7	3	86
5	81	(United Kingdom) TF Sport	Ret	6	14	3	2	13	1	11	81
6	33	(United Kingdom) TF Sport	1	7	13	6	7	Ret	11	6	78
7	54	(Italy) Vista AF Corse	8	5	3	Ret	11	3	6	Ret	54
8	46	(Belgium) Team WRT	11	**2**	9	Ret	10	2	4	15	52
9	78	(France) Akkodis ASP Team	4	3	**8**	Ret	5	14	9	**Ret**	51
10	31	(Belgium) The Bend Team WRT	3	12	Ret	Ret	12	9	3	7	49
11	95	(United Kingdom) United Autosports	**7**	9	Ret	Ret	9	1	10	9	43
12	59	(United Kingdom) United Autosports	2	14	15	Ret	8	4	14	16	43
13	61	(Italy) Iron Lynx	Ret	13	11	8	Ret	Ret	8	2	39
14	77	(Germany) Proton Competition	Ret	10	4	7	Ret	6	12	8	39
15	10	(France) Racing Spirit of Léman	9	11	6	9	**3**	11	**17**	14	32
16	88	(Germany) Proton Competition	10	16	2	Ret	Ret	**8**	Ret	10	27
17	85	(Italy) Iron Dames	13	8	10	10	4	Ret	13	12	19
18	60	(Italy) Iron Lynx	NC	15	12	Ret	15	10	16	13	1
Pos.	Car	Team	QAT (Qatar)	IMO (Italy)	SPA (Belgium)	LMS (France)	SÃO (Brazil)	COA (United States)	FUJ (Japan)	BHR (Bahrain)	Points

== See also ==
- 2025 IMSA SportsCar Championship
- 2025 European Le Mans Series
