= Sébastien Baud =

French racing driver (born 2000)

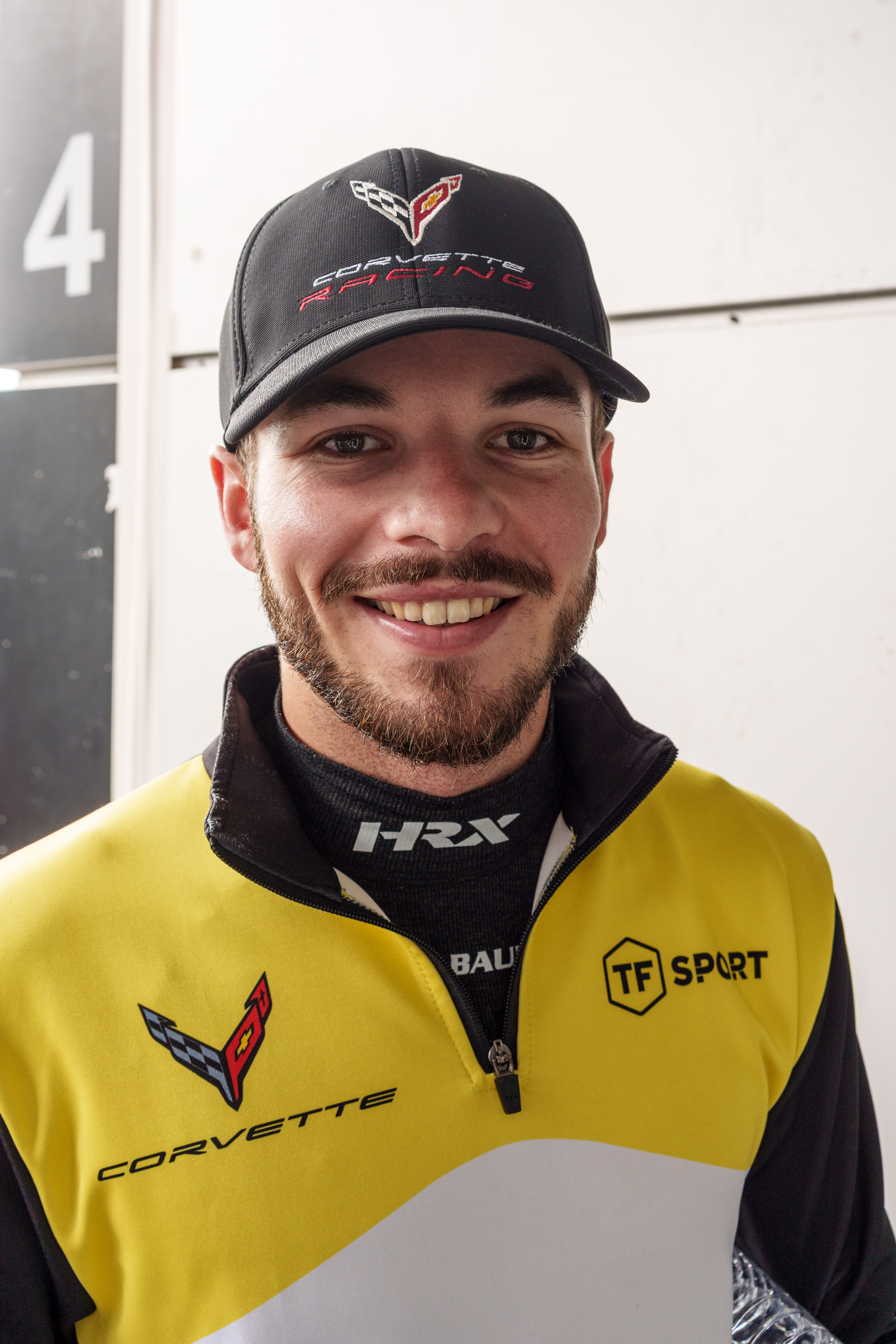
- Baud at the 2024 6 Hours of Fuji
- Nationality: (France) French
- Born: 6 July 2000 (age 26) Annecy, France

WEC career
- Debut season: 2024
- Current team: United Autosports
- Categorisation: FIA Silver
- Car number: 82
- Former teams: TF Sport
- Starts: 13 (13 entries)
- Wins: 0
- Podiums: 2
- Poles: 0
- Best finish: 14th in 2024

Previous series
- 2022–23 2021 2020: GTWC Europe Endurance Cup; GT4 European Series; Ligier European Series

Championship titles
- 2020: Ligier European Series - JS2 R

Sébastien Baud (born 6 July 2000) is a French racing driver. He competes in the FIA World Endurance Championship, driving in the LMGT3 class for United Autosports.

== Career ==
Baud raced in karting during his youth, notably competing in the French national championship in 2016. Having driven in the French Mitjet 2.0 L series in 2017 with GPC Motorsports, Baud entered both the French and European championships the following year. With ten wins and a total of 18 podiums, he managed to win the former in his debut year. He progressed into the Porsche Carrera Cup France for 2019, though Baud only competed in the last three events as he was combining this with a venture into rallying.

In 2020, Baud joined Cool Racing for the inaugural campaign of the Ligier European Series, driving in the JS2 R category. Having established himself as the title protagonist by completing a clean sweep of both Le Castellet rounds, the Frenchman finished on the podium a further four times to beat Natan Bihel to the title.

For the 2021 season, Baud would enter the GT4 European Series, partnering Enzo Joulié at CD Sport. The pair finished 13th in the Silver Cup standings and scored a best result of seventh. This proved to be preparation for Baud's step-up into GT3 racing in 2022, as he once again drove a Mercedes, this time a Mercedes-AMG GT3 Evo, at GetSpeed Performance in the GT World Challenge Europe Endurance Cup. Driving alongside Valdemar Eriksen and Jeff Kingsley in the Silver Cup class, Baud only took two points finishes in the category and ended up a lowly 27th in the championship. Parallel to his GTWC commitments, Baud drove for GetSpeed in the International GT Open series. He and Steve Jans finished fourth overall, coming up strong in the second half of the campaign with three podiums.

Baud remained in the series for the 2023 season, this time competing in the Bronze Cup at Haupt Racing Team with Arjun Maini and Hubert Haupt. Together the trio took a class victory at Le Castellet, benefiting from a late issue for Henrique Chaves. They scored two more subclass podiums to finish second in the Bronze Cup standings, three points shy of Sky – Tempesta Racing. Baud also drove alongside Haupt as a bronze class entry in the GT World Challenge Europe Sprint Cup, winning the class during race 2 at the Hockenheimring.

Baud progressed to the FIA World Endurance Championship in 2024, joining TF Sport with their Chevrolet Corvette Z06 GT3.R and partnering their new factory driver Daniel Juncadella as well as bronze-ranked Hiroshi Koizumi. Baud made headlines in only his second race, the rain-impacted 6 Hours of Imola, by winning the Goodyear Wingfoot Award, handed to the driver who clocks the fastest stint in the LMGT3 class. The trio finished the year 14th in the standings, with a podium at the season-ending 8 Hours of Bahrain.

== Racing record ==
=== Racing career summary ===
Season	Series	Team	Races	Wins	Poles	F/Laps	Podiums	Points	Position
2018	French Mitjet 2L Championship	GPC Motorsports	21	10	?	?	18	?	**1st**
2019	Porsche Carrera Cup France	Pierre Martinet by Alméras	5	0	0	0	0	21	16th
2020	Ligier European Series - JS2 R	Cool Racing	10	4	2	1	8	169	**1st**
2021	GT4 European Series - Silver Cup	CD Sport	12	0	0	0	0	34	13th
2021	French GT4 Cup - Silver Cup	CD Sport	4	0	0	0	2	0	NC†
2021	Le Mans Cup - LMP3	MV2S Racing	2	0	0	0	0	0	NC†
2022	GT World Challenge Europe Endurance Cup	GetSpeed Performance	5	0	0	0	0	0	NC
2022	GT World Challenge Europe Endurance Cup - Silver Cup	GetSpeed Performance	5	0	0	0	0	8	27th
2022	International GT Open	Mercedes-AMG Team GetSpeed Performance	13	0	0	0	3	64	4th
2022	International GT Open - Pro-Am	Mercedes-AMG Team GetSpeed Performance	5	0	0	0	1	12	11th
2023	GT World Challenge Europe Endurance Cup	Haupt Racing Team	5	0	0	0	0	0	NC
2023	GT World Challenge Europe Endurance Cup - Bronze Cup	Haupt Racing Team	5	1	0	0	3	89	**2nd**
2023	GT World Challenge Europe Sprint Cup	Haupt Racing Team	6	0	0	0	0	0	NC
2023	GT World Challenge Europe Sprint Cup - Bronze Cup	Haupt Racing Team	6	1	1	0	1	38.5	6th
2024	FIA World Endurance Championship - LMGT3	TF Sport	8	0	0	0	1	37	14th
2024	GT World Challenge Europe Endurance Cup	Boutsen VDS	1	0	0	0	0	0	NC
2025	FIA World Endurance Championship - LMGT3	United Autosports	8	0	0	0	1	43	12th
2025	GT World Challenge Europe Endurance Cup	Dinamic GT	1	0	0	0	0	0	NC
2026	IMSA SportsCar Championship - GTD	van der Steur Racing	2	0	0	0	0	429	53rd
2026	GT World Challenge Europe Endurance Cup	Comtoyou Racing	5	0	0	0	0	0	NC

^{†} As Baud was a guest driver, he was ineligible to score points.^{*} Season still in progress.

=== Complete Ligier European Series results ===
(key) (Races in bold indicate pole position; results in italics indicate fastest lap)

Year	Entrant	Class	Chassis	1	2	3	4	5	6	7	8	9	10	Rank	Points
2020	Cool Racing	JS2 R	Ligier JS2 R	LEC1; 1; 1	**LEC1**; **2**; 1	SPA; 1; 3	SPA; 2; 2	LEC2; 1; 1	**LEC2**; **2**; 1	MNZ; 1; 7	MNZ; 2 Ret	ALG; 1; 3	ALG; 2; 3	1st	169

=== Complete GT4 European Series results ===
(key) (Races in bold indicate pole position) (Races in italics indicate fastest lap)

Year	Team	Car	Class	1	2	3	4	5	6	7	8	9	10	11	12	Pos	Points
2021	CD Sport	Mercedes-AMG GT4	Silver	MNZ; 1; 22	MNZ; 2; 6	LEC; 1; 36	LEC; 2; 10	ZAN; 1; 7	ZAN; 2; 10	SPA; 1 Ret	SPA; 2; 30	NÜR; 1; 19	NÜR; 2; 24	CAT; 1; 22	CAT; 2; 33†	13th	34

=== Complete GT World Challenge Europe results ===
==== GT World Challenge Europe Endurance Cup ====
(key) (Races in bold indicate pole position; races in italics indicate fastest lap)

Year	Team	Car	Class	1	2	3	4	5	6	7	Pos.	Points
2022	GetSpeed Performance	Mercedes-AMG GT3 Evo	Silver	IMO; Ret	LEC; 28	SPA; 6H; 55	SPA; 12H; Ret	SPA; 24H; Ret	HOC; 33	CAT; 19	27th	8
2023	Haupt Racing Team	Mercedes-AMG GT3 Evo	Bronze	MNZ; 18	LEC; 14	SPA; 6H; 36	SPA; 12H; 34	SPA; 24H; 24	NÜR; 24	CAT; 25	2nd	89
2024	Boutsen VDS	Mercedes-AMG GT3 Evo	Silver	LEC	SPA; 6H; 27	SPA; 12H; 32	SPA; 24H; 40	NÜR	MNZ	JED	27th	13
2025	Dinamic GT	Porsche 911 GT3 R (992)	Silver	LEC	MNZ	SPA; 6H; 21	SPA; 12H; 43	SPA; 24H; 30	NÜR	CAT	24th	15
2026	Comtoyou Racing	Aston Martin Vantage AMR GT3 Evo	Silver	**LEC**; 20	MNZ; 27	SPA; 6H; 28	SPA; 12H; 59†	SPA; 24H; Ret	NÜR; 24	ALG; 32	9th	39

==== GT World Challenge Europe Sprint Cup ====
(key) (Races in bold indicate pole position; races in italics indicate fastest lap)

Year	Team	Car	Class	1	2	3	4	5	6	Pos.	Points
2023	Haupt Racing Team	Mercedes-AMG GT3 Evo	Bronze	MIS; 1; 25	MIS; 2; 25	HOC; 1 Ret	HOC; 2; 18	VAL; 1; 24	**VAL**; **2**; 31	6th	38.5

=== Complete FIA World Endurance Championship results ===
(key) (Races in bold indicate pole position; races in italics indicate fastest lap)

Year	Entrant	Class	Car	Engine	1	2	3	4	5	6	7	8	Rank	Points
2024	TF Sport	LMGT3	Chevrolet Corvette Z06 GT3.R	Chevrolet LT6.R 5.5 L V8	QAT; 10	IMO; 8	SPA; 12	LMS; 9	SÃO; Ret	COA; 8	FUJ; Ret	BHR; 3	14th	37
2025	United Autosports	LMGT3	McLaren 720S GT3 Evo	McLaren M840T 4.0 L Turbo V8	QAT; 2	IMO; 14	SPA; 15	LMS; Ret	SÃO; 8	COA; 4	FUJ; 14	BHR; 16	12th	43

=== Complete 24 Hours of Le Mans results ===
Year	Team	Co-Drivers	Car	Class	Laps	Pos.	Class Pos.
2024	(United Kingdom) TF Sport	(Spain) Daniel Juncadella (Japan) Hiroshi Koizumi	Chevrolet Corvette Z06 GT3.R	LMGT3	278	38th	11th
2025	(United Kingdom) United Autosports	(United Kingdom) James Cottingham (Switzerland) Grégoire Saucy	McLaren 720S GT3 Evo	LMGT3	314	DNF	DNF

=== Complete IMSA SportsCar Championship results ===
(key) (Races in bold indicate pole position) (Races in italics indicate fastest lap)

Year	Team	Class	Make	Engine	1	2	3	4	5	6	7	8	9	10	Pos.	Points
2026	van der Steur Racing	GTD	Aston Martin Vantage AMR GT3 Evo	Aston Martin M177 4.0 L Turbo V8	DAY; 11	SEB; 13	LBH	LGA	WGL	MOS	ELK	VIR	IMS	PET	53rd	429
