= 2020 Ligier European Series =

The 2020 Ligier European Series was the first season of the Ligier European Series. The five-event season began at Circuit Paul Ricard on 18 July and finished at Algarve International Circuit on 31 October.

== Calendar ==
The original calendar was revealed on September 20, 2019, featuring a five round calendar with Circuit de Barcelona-Catalunya as its opening venue on 3–4 April. However, with the Covid-19 pandemic, the calendar was modified according to that year's European Le Mans Series calendar, therefore removing the Barcelona Heat and replacing it with another Paul Ricard Heat.

| Round | Race | Circuit | Location | Date |
|---|---|---|---|---|
| 1 | Le Castellet Heat | (France) Circuit Paul Ricard | Le Castellet, France | 18 July |
| 2 | Spa Heat | (Belgium) Circuit de Spa-Francorchamps | Spa, Belgium | 8 August |
| 3 | Le Castellet Heat 2 | (France) Circuit Paul Ricard | Le Castellet, France | 29 August |
| 4 | Monza Heat | (Italy) Autodromo Nazionale di Monza | Monza, Italy | 10 October |
| 5 | Portimao Heat | (Portugal) Algarve International Circuit | Portimão, Portugal | 31 October |

== Entry list ==
| Team | Car | No. | Drivers | Rounds |
JS P4
| (France) MV2S Racing | Ligier JS P4 | 14 | (France) Alex Marchois | 4 |
| (France) MV2S Racing | Ligier JS P4 | 14 | (France) Franck Marchois | 4 |
| (France) M Racing | Ligier JS P4 | 16 | (France) Sacha Lehmann | 1–2 |
| (United Kingdom) Raw Motorsport | Ligier JS P4 | 27 | (United Kingdom) Andrew Ferguson | 4 |
| (United Kingdom) Raw Motorsport | Ligier JS P4 | 27 | (United Kingdom) Jeremy Ferguson | 4 |
| (France) Les Deux Arbres | Ligier JS P4 | 33 | (France) Thomas Duchene | 1 |
| (France) Les Deux Arbres | Ligier JS P4 | 33 | (France) Julien Schell | 1 |
| (France) Les Deux Arbres | Ligier JS P4 | 34 | (France) Valentin Simonet | 1 |
| (France) Les Deux Arbres | Ligier JS P4 | 34 | (France) Alexandre Yvon | 1 |
| (Italy) HP Racing Team | Ligier JS P4 | 50 | (Italy) Andrea Dromedari | All |
| (Belgium) Milo Racing | Ligier JS P4 | 81 | (Belgium) Kevin Balthazar | 1–2, 4–5 |
| (Belgium) Milo Racing | Ligier JS P4 | 81 | (Belgium) Christophe Nivarlet | 1 |
| (Italy) Monza Garage | Ligier JS P4 | 88 | (Australia) John Corbett | 4 |
| (Italy) Monza Garage | Ligier JS P4 | 88 | (Italy) Federico Leo | 4 |
JS2 R
| (France) TM Evolution | Ligier JS2 R | 11 | (France) Alain Grand | 1–3, 5 |
| (France) TM Evolution | Ligier JS2 R | 25 | (France) Bruno Chaudet | 1–3, 5 |
| (Russia) Arctic Energy | Ligier JS2 R | 17 | (Russia) Nerses Isaakyan | All |
| (Russia) Arctic Energy | Ligier JS2 R | 17 | (Russia) Sergey Egorov | 1, 4–5 |
| (Spain) CD Sport | Ligier JS2 R | 30 | (France) Baptiste Berthelot | All |
| (Spain) CD Sport | Ligier JS2 R | 30 | (France) Claude Dégremont | All |
| (Switzerland) Sub5Zero Motorsports | Ligier JS2 R | 32 | (Italy) Riccardo Di Persia | 4 |
| (Switzerland) Sub5Zero Motorsports | Ligier JS2 R | 32 | (Switzerland) Andreas Ritzi | 4 |
| (France) HRC | Ligier JS2 R | 38 | (France) Marc Guillot | 1 |
| (France) HRC | Ligier JS2 R | 38 | (France) Jean Marc Thevenot | 1 |
| (France) HRC | Ligier JS2 R | 38 | (France) Fabien Michal | 2–4 |
| (France) HRC | Ligier JS2 R | 38 | (Luxembourg) Clément Seyler | 2–3 |
| (France) HRC | Ligier JS2 R | 38 | (France) Herve Roger | 4 |
| (France) HRC | Ligier JS2 R | 38 | (France) Julien Rodrigues | 5 |
| (France) MV2S Racing | Ligier JS2 R | 45 | (Russia) Mikhaïl Makarovskii | All |
| (France) MV2S Racing | Ligier JS2 R | 45 | (Russia) Viktor Shaytar | 1–3 |
| (France) MV2S Racing | Ligier JS2 R | 46 | (France) Antoine Chapus | 1–5 |
| (France) MV2S Racing | Ligier JS2 R | 46 | (France) Alex Marchois | 1 |
| (France) MV2S Racing | Ligier JS2 R | 46 | (Belgium) Laurent Richard | 2 |
| (France) MV2S Racing | Ligier JS2 R | 46 | (France) Gaëtan Essart | 4–5 |
| (France) M Racing | Ligier JS2 R | 66 | (France) Natan Bihel | All |
| (France) M Racing | Ligier JS2 R | 66 | (France) Erwan Bihel | 1–4 |
| (France) M Racing | Ligier JS2 R | 69 | (France) Laurent Millara | 1–4 |
| (France) M Racing | Ligier JS2 R | 69 | (France) Erwan Bihel | 5 |
| (France) M Racing | Ligier JS2 R | 86 | (France) Mathieu Martins | All |
| (France) M Racing | Ligier JS2 R | 86 | (France) Ewen Hachez | 1, 3 |
| (Switzerland) Cool Racing | Ligier JS2 R | 74 | (France) Sébastien Baud | All |
Entrylists:

== Results ==
Bold indicates overall winner.

| Rnd. | | Circuit | JS P4 Winning Team | JS2 R Winning Team | Report |
| Rnd. | | Circuit | JS P4 Winning Drivers | JS2 R Winning Drivers | Report |
|---|---|---|---|---|---|
| 1 | R1 | (France) Circuit Paul Ricard | (Italy) **No. 50 HP Racing Team** | (Switzerland) No. 74 Cool Racing | |
| 1 | R1 | (France) Circuit Paul Ricard | **(Italy) Andrea Dromedari** | (France) Sébastien Baud | |
| 1 | R2 | (France) Circuit Paul Ricard | (France) **No. 33 Valentin Simonet** | (Switzerland) No. 74 Cool Racing | |
| 1 | R2 | (France) Circuit Paul Ricard | **(France) Valentin Simonet** **(France) Alexandre Yvon** | (France) Sébastien Baud | |
| 2 | R1 | (Belgium) Circuit de Spa-Francorchamps | (Belgium) **No. 81 Milo Racing** | (Russia) No. 17 Arctic Energy | |
| 2 | R1 | (Belgium) Circuit de Spa-Francorchamps | (Belgium) **Kevin Balthazar** | (Russia) Nerses Isaakyan | |
| 2 | R2 | (Belgium) Circuit de Spa-Francorchamps | (Belgium) **No. 81 Milo Racing** | (France) No. 86 M Racing | |
| 2 | R2 | (Belgium) Circuit de Spa-Francorchamps | (Belgium) **Kevin Balthazar** | (France) Mathieu Martins | |
| 3 | R1 | (France) Circuit Paul Ricard | (Italy) **No. 50 HP Racing Team** | (Switzerland) No. 74 Cool Racing | |
| 3 | R1 | (France) Circuit Paul Ricard | (Italy) **Andrea Dromedari** | (France) Sébastien Baud | |
| 3 | R2 | (France) Circuit Paul Ricard | (Italy) No. 50 HP Racing Team | (Switzerland) **No. 74 Cool Racing** | |
| 3 | R2 | (France) Circuit Paul Ricard | (Italy) Andrea Dromedari | (France) **Sébastien Baud** | |
| 4 | R1 | (Italy) Autodromo Nazionale di Monza | (Belgium) **No. 81 Milo Racing** | (France) No. 86 M Racing | |
| 4 | R1 | (Italy) Autodromo Nazionale di Monza | (Belgium) **Kevin Balthazar** | (France) Mathieu Martins | |
| 4 | R2 | (Italy) Autodromo Nazionale di Monza | (Belgium) **No. 81 Milo Racing** | (France) No. 66 M Racing | |
| 4 | R2 | (Italy) Autodromo Nazionale di Monza | (Belgium) **Kevin Balthazar** | (France) Natan Bihel | |
| 5 | R1 | (Portugal) Algarve International Circuit | (Belgium) **No. 81 Milo Racing** | (France) No. 66 M Racing | |
| 5 | R1 | (Portugal) Algarve International Circuit | (Belgium) **Kevin Balthazar** | (France) Natan Bihel | |
| 5 | R2 | (Portugal) Algarve International Circuit | (Belgium) **No. 81 Milo Racing** | (France) No. 86 M Racing | |
| 5 | R2 | (Portugal) Algarve International Circuit | (Belgium) **Kevin Balthazar** | (France) Mathieu Martins | |
Results:

== Championship standings ==
=== Drivers ===
==== JS P4 Class ====
| Pos. | Driver | Team | RIC (France) | | SPA (Belgium) | | LEC (France) | | MNZ (Italy) | | POR (Portugal) | | Points |
| Pos. | Driver | Team | R1 | R2 | R1 | R2 | R1 | R2 | R1 | R2 | R1 | R2 | Points |
|---|---|---|---|---|---|---|---|---|---|---|---|---|---|
| 1 | (Italy) Andrea Dromedari | (Italy) HP Racing Team | 1 | 2 | 3 | 3 | 1 | 1 | 2 | 2 | 2 | 2 | 195 |
| 2 | (Belgium) Kevin Balthazar | (Belgium) Milo Racing | 2 | 3 | 1 | 1 | | | 1 | 1 | 1 | 1 | 183 |
| 3 | (France) Valentin Simonet (France) Alexandre Yvon | (France) Les Deux Arbres | 3 | 1 | | | | | | | | | 40 |
| 4 | (France) Sacha Lehmann | (France) M Racing | | | 2 | 2 | | | | | | | 36 |
| 5 | (Belgium) Christophe Nivarlet | (Belgium) Milo Racing | 2 | 3 | | | | | | | | | 33 |
| 6 | (Italy) Federico Leo (Australia) John Corbett | (Italy) Monza Garage | | | | | | | 3 | 3 | | | 30 |
| 7 | (France) Thomas Duchene (France) Julien Schell | (France) Les Deux Arbres | 4 | 4 | | | | | | | | | 24 |
| 8 | (United Kingdom) Andrew Ferguson (United Kingdom) Jeremy Ferguson | (United Kingdom) Raw Motorsport | | | | | | | 4 | 4 | | | 24 |
| 9 | (France) Franck Marchois (France) Alex Marchois | (France) MV2S Racing | | | | | | | 5 | 5 | | | 20 |
Standings:

==== JS2 R Class ====
| Pos. | Driver | Team | RIC (France) | | SPA (Belgium) | | LEC (France) | | MNZ (Italy) | | POR (Portugal) | | Points |
| Pos. | Driver | Team | R1 | R2 | R1 | R2 | R1 | R2 | R1 | R2 | R1 | R2 | Points |
|---|---|---|---|---|---|---|---|---|---|---|---|---|---|
| 1 | (France) Sébastien Baud | (Switzerland) Cool Racing | 1 | 1 | 3 | 2 | 1 | 1 | 7 | Ret | 3 | 3 | 169 |
| 2 | (France) Natan Bihel | (France) M Racing | 2 | 2 | 4 | 4 | 5 | 5 | Ret | 1 | 1 | 2 | 148 |
| 3 | (France) Mathieu Martins | (France) M Racing | Ret | 9 | 2 | 1 | 4 | Ret | 1 | 6 | 2 | 1 | 131 |
| 4 | (France) Erwan Bihel | (France) M Racing | 2 | 2 | 4 | 4 | 5 | 5 | | | Ret | 7 | 86 |
| 5 | (France) Claude Dégremont (France) Baptiste Berthelot | (Spain) CD Sport | Ret | 11 | 6 | Ret | Ret | 2 | 3 | 2 | 4 | 6 | 79.5 |
| 6 | (France) Fabien Michal | (France) HRC | | | 8 | 3 | 3 | 4 | 2 | 3 | | | 79 |
| 7 | (France) Antoine Chapus | (France) MV2S Racing | 4 | 5 | Ret | 6 | 7 | 6 | 5 | 6 | 6 | Ret | 70 |
| 8 | (Russia) Nerses Isaakyan | (Russia) Arctic Energy | Ret | 8 | 1 | Ret | 2 | 3 | Ret | DNS | Ret | 8 | 66 |
| 9 | (France) Laurent Millara | (France) M Racing | 5 | 3 | 5 | 5 | Ret | Ret | 6 | 5 | | | 63 |
| 10 | (Russia) Mikhaïl Makarovskii | (France) MV2S Racing | 8 | 4 | Ret | DNS | 6 | 7 | 4 | 8 | 9 | 9 | 50 |
| 11 | (Luxembourg) Clément Seyler | (France) HRC | | | 8 | 3 | 3 | 4 | | | | | 46 |
| 12 | (France) Bruno Chaudet | (France) TM Evolution | 6 | 7 | 7 | Ret | 8 | Ret | | | 7 | 10 | 40 |
| 13 | (France) Herve Roger | (France) HRC | | | | | | | 2 | 3 | | | 33 |
| 14 | (Russia) Victor Shaytar | (France) MV2S Racing | 8 | 4 | Ret | DNS | 6 | 7 | | | | | 30 |
| 15 | (France) Gaëtan Essart | (France) MV2S Racing | | | | | | | 5 | 5 | 6 | Ret | 26 |
| 16 | (France) Marc Guillot (France) Jean Marc Thevenot | (France) HRC | 3 | 6 | | | | | | | | | 23 |
| 17 | (France) Alain Grand | (France) TM Evolution | 7 | 10 | 9 | 7 | Ret | 4 | | | 4 | Ret | 23 |
| 18 | (France) Julien Rodrigues | (France) HRC | | | | | | | | | 5 | 4 | 22 |
| 19 | (France) Alex Marchois | (France) MV2S Racing | 4 | 5 | | | | | | | | | 22 |
| 20 | (Switzerland) Andreas Ritzi (Italy) Riccardo Di Persia | (Switzerland) Sub5Zero Motorsports | | | | | | | 8 | 4 | | | 16 |
| 21 | (France) Ewen Hachez | (France) M Racing | Ret | 9 | | | 4 | Ret | | | | | 14 |
| 22 | (Belgium) Laurent Richard | (France) MV2S Racing | | | Ret | 6 | | | | | | | 8 |
| 23 | (Russia) Sergey Egorov | (Russia) Arctic Energy | Ret | 8 | | | | | Ret | DNS | | | 4 |
Standings:

=== Teams ===
==== JS P4 Class ====
| Pos. | Team | RIC (France) | | SPA (Belgium) | | LEC (France) | | MNZ (Italy) | | POR (Portugal) | | Points |
| Pos. | Team | R1 | R2 | R1 | R2 | R1 | R2 | R1 | R2 | R1 | R2 | Points |
|---|---|---|---|---|---|---|---|---|---|---|---|---|
| 1 | (Italy) #50 HP Racing Team | 1 | 2 | 3 | 3 | 1 | 1 | 2 | 2 | 2 | 2 | 195 |
| 2 | (Belgium) #81 Milo Racing | 2 | 3 | 1 | 1 | | | 1 | 1 | 1 | 1 | 183 |
| 3 | (France) #33 Les Deux Arbres | 3 | 1 | | | | | | | | | 40 |
| 4 | (France) #16 M Racing | | | 2 | 2 | | | | | | | 36 |
| 5 | (Italy) #88 Monza Garage | | | | | | | 3 | 3 | | | 30 |
| 6 | (France) #34 Les Deux Arbres | 4 | 4 | | | | | | | | | 24 |
| 7 | (United Kingdom) #27 Raw Motorsport | | | | | | | 4 | 4 | | | 24 |
| 8 | (France) #24 MV2S Racing | | | | | | | 5 | 5 | | | 20 |
Standings:

==== JS2 R Class ====
| Pos. | Team | RIC (France) | | SPA (Belgium) | | LEC (France) | | MNZ (Italy) | | POR (Portugal) | | Points |
| Pos. | Team | R1 | R2 | R1 | R2 | R1 | R2 | R1 | R2 | R1 | R2 | Points |
|---|---|---|---|---|---|---|---|---|---|---|---|---|
| 1 | (Switzerland) #74 Cool Racing | 1 | 1 | 3 | 2 | 1 | 1 | 7 | Ret | 3 | 3 | 169 |
| 2 | (France) #66 M Racing | 2 | 2 | 4 | 4 | 5 | 5 | Ret | 1 | 1 | 2 | 148 |
| 3 | (France) #86 M Racing | Ret | 9 | 2 | 1 | 4 | Ret | 1 | 6 | 2 | 1 | 131 |
| 4 | (France) #38 HRC | 3 | 6 | 8 | 3 | 3 | 4 | 2 | 3 | 5 | 4 | 124 |
| 5 | (Spain) #30 CD Sport | Ret | 11 | 6 | Ret | Ret | 2 | 3 | 2 | 4 | 6 | 79,5 |
| 6 | (France) #46 MV2S Racing | 4 | 5 | Ret | 6 | 7 | 6 | 5 | 6 | 6 | Ret | 70 |
| 7 | (France) #69 M Racing | 5 | 3 | 5 | 5 | Ret | Ret | 6 | 5 | Ret | 7 | 69 |
| 8 | (Russia) #17 Arctic Energy | Ret | 8 | 1 | Ret | 2 | 3 | Ret | DNS | Ret | 8 | 66 |
| 9 | (France) #45 MV2S Racing | 8 | 4 | Ret | DNS | 6 | 7 | 4 | 8 | 9 | 9 | 50 |
| 10 | (France) #25 TM Evolution | 6 | 7 | 7 | Ret | 8 | Ret | | | 7 | 10 | 40 |
| 11 | (France) #11 TM Evolution | 7 | 10 | 9 | 7 | Ret | 4 | | | 4 | Ret | 23 |
| 12 | (Switzerland) #32 Sub5Zero Motorsports | | | | | | | 8 | 4 | | | 16 |
Standings:
