= 2025 Lone Star Le Mans =

Sports car endurance race

(United States) 2025 Lone Star Le Mans
Event information
- Round 6 of 8 in the 2025 FIA World Endurance Championship
- Date: 7 September 2025
- Location: Austin, Texas
- Venue: Circuit of the Americas
- Duration: 6 hours
- Weather: Wet. Air temperature: 23.2–24.5 °C (73.8–76.1 °F). Track temperature: 25.8–28.0 °C (78.4–82.4 °F)

Results
- Laps completed: 120
- Distance (km): 661.56
- Distance (miles): 411.12
- Hypercar

Pole position
- Time: 1:57.655
- Team: (Italy) AF Corse
- Drivers: (Poland) Robert Kubica

Winners
- Team: (Germany) Porsche Penske Motorsport
- Drivers: (Australia) Matt Campbell (France) Kévin Estre (Belgium) Laurens Vanthoor
- LMGT3

Winners
- Team: (United Kingdom) United Autosports
- Drivers: (Indonesia) Sean Gelael (United Kingdom) Darren Leung (Japan) Marino Sato

The 2025 Lone Star Le Mans was an endurance sportscar racing event, held between 5 and 7 September 2025 at Circuit of the Americas in Austin, Texas. It was the sixth of eight rounds of the 2025 FIA World Endurance Championship and the eighth running of the event.

== Entry list ==
The provisional entry list was published on 22 August 2025 and consists of 36 entries across 2 categories – 18 in both Hypercar and LMGT3. In the Hypercar category, Sébastien Buemi, Robin Frijns, Jean-Eric Vergne and Stoffel Vandoorne return to their respective lineups after missing the previous round due to the Berlin ePrix. Matt Campbell and Mathieu Jaminet are added back the Penske Hypercar entries. In the LMGT3 category, Timur Boguslavskiy and Derek DeBoer return to the No. 31 Team WRT BMW and the No. 10 Racing Spirit of Léman Aston Martin respectively. Ben Barnicoat comes back to the No. 78 Akkodis ASP Team Lexus, after missing multiple rounds due to an injury and clashes with the IMSA WeatherTech SportsCar Championship commitments. Mike Conway suffered a training injury and was replaced by José María López with López's replacement later confirmed to be Jack Hawksworth in the No. 87 Akkodis Lexus.

== Schedule ==
Date	Time (local: CST)	Event
Friday, 5 September	11:30	Free Practice 1
Friday, 5 September	16:30	Free Practice 2
Saturday, 6 September	11:00	Free Practice 3
Saturday, 6 September	15:00	Qualifying – LMGT3
Saturday, 6 September	15:20	Hyperpole – LMGT3
Saturday, 6 September	15:40	Qualifying – Hypercar
Saturday, 6 September	16:00	Hyperpole – Hypercar
Sunday, 7 September	13:00	Race

== Qualifying ==
=== Qualifying results ===
Pole position winners in each class are marked in bold.

Pos	Class	No.	Entrant	Qualifying	Hyperpole	Grid
1	Hypercar	**83**	**(Italy) AF Corse**	**1:58.405**	**1:57.655**	1
2	Hypercar	51	(Italy) Ferrari AF Corse	1:59.261	1:57.751	2
3	Hypercar	6	(Germany) Porsche Penske Motorsport	1:58.801	1:58.619	3
4	Hypercar	50	(Italy) Ferrari AF Corse	1:59.035	1:58.640	4
5	Hypercar	99	(Germany) Proton Competition	1:58.155	1:58.839	5
6	Hypercar	35	(France) Alpine Endurance Team	1:59.727	2:00.468	6
7	Hypercar	8	(Japan) Toyota Gazoo Racing	2:00.467	2:02.926	7
8	Hypercar	15	(Germany) BMW M Team WRT	1:59.676	2:03.243	8
9	Hypercar	009	(United Kingdom) Aston Martin THOR Team	1:59.751	2:04.024	9
10	Hypercar	5	(Germany) Porsche Penske Motorsport	2:00.731		10
11	Hypercar	94	(France) Peugeot TotalEnergies	2:00.744		11
12	Hypercar	36	(France) Alpine Endurance Team	2:00.763		12
13	Hypercar	20	(Germany) BMW M Team WRT	2:01.034		13
14	Hypercar	007	(United Kingdom) Aston Martin THOR Team	2:01.100		14
15	Hypercar	38	(United States) Cadillac Hertz Team Jota	2:03.382		15
16	Hypercar	12	(United States) Cadillac Hertz Team Jota	2:03.952		16
17	Hypercar	7	(Japan) Toyota Gazoo Racing	2:05.282		17
18	Hypercar	93	(France) Peugeot TotalEnergies	No time		18
19	**LMGT3**	**88**	**(Germany) Proton Competition**	**2:16.650**	**2:07.645**	19
20	LMGT3	77	(Germany) Proton Competition	2:16.411	2:07.663	20
21	LMGT3	95	(United Kingdom) United Autosports	2:16.312	2:08.262	21
22	LMGT3	46	(Belgium) Team WRT	2:13.371	2:08.972	22
23	LMGT3	33	(United Kingdom) TF Sport	2:15.838	2:09.465	26
24	LMGT3	59	(United Kingdom) United Autosports	2:14.901	2:09.499	23
25	LMGT3	78	(France) Akkodis ASP Team	2:15.278	2:09.727	24
26	LMGT3	60	(Italy) Iron Lynx	2:16.376	2:10.113	25
27	LMGT3	31	(Belgium) The Bend Team WRT	2:12.241	2:10.229	27
28	LMGT3	27	(United States) Heart of Racing Team	2:14.324	2:10.640	28
29	LMGT3	81	(United Kingdom) TF Sport	2:16.801		29
30	LMGT3	61	(Italy) Iron Lynx	2:17.308		30
31	LMGT3	92	(Germany) Manthey 1st Phorm	2:17.545		31
32	LMGT3	54	(Italy) Vista AF Corse	2:18.128		32
33	LMGT3	10	(France) Racing Spirit of Léman	2:20.382		33
34	LMGT3	21	(Italy) Vista AF Corse	2:21.236		34
35	LMGT3	85	(Italy) Iron Dames	2:22.433		35
36	LMGT3	87	(France) Akkodis ASP Team	No time		36

== Race ==
The race started at 13:00 CST on Sunday, and ran for six hours.

=== Race results ===
Class winners are in bold and ‡.

Pos	Class	No	Team	Drivers	Chassis	Tyre	Laps	Time/Retired
Pos	Class	No	Team	Drivers	Engine	Tyre	Laps	Time/Retired
1	**Hypercar**	**6**	**(Germany) Porsche Penske Motorsport**	**(Australia) Matt Campbell** **(France) Kévin Estre** **(Belgium) Laurens Vanthoor**	**Porsche 963**	M	**120**	**6:01:25.310‡**
1	**Hypercar**	**6**	**(Germany) Porsche Penske Motorsport**	**(Australia) Matt Campbell** **(France) Kévin Estre** **(Belgium) Laurens Vanthoor**	**Porsche 9RD 4.6 L Turbo V8**	M	**120**	**6:01:25.310‡**
2	Hypercar	50	(Italy) Ferrari AF Corse	(Italy) Antonio Fuoco (Spain) Miguel Molina (Denmark) Nicklas Nielsen	Ferrari 499P	M	120	+8.625
2	Hypercar	50	(Italy) Ferrari AF Corse	(Italy) Antonio Fuoco (Spain) Miguel Molina (Denmark) Nicklas Nielsen	Ferrari F163 3.0 L Turbo V6	M	120	+8.625
3	Hypercar	94	(France) Peugeot TotalEnergies	(France) Loïc Duval (Denmark) Malthe Jakobsen (Belgium) Stoffel Vandoorne	Peugeot 9X8	M	120	+9.541
3	Hypercar	94	(France) Peugeot TotalEnergies	(France) Loïc Duval (Denmark) Malthe Jakobsen (Belgium) Stoffel Vandoorne	Peugeot X6H 2.6 L Turbo V6	M	120	+9.541
4	Hypercar	93	(France) Peugeot TotalEnergies	(Denmark) Mikkel Jensen (United Kingdom) Paul di Resta (France) Jean-Éric Vergne	Peugeot 9X8	M	120	+15.149
4	Hypercar	93	(France) Peugeot TotalEnergies	(Denmark) Mikkel Jensen (United Kingdom) Paul di Resta (France) Jean-Éric Vergne	Peugeot X6H 2.6 L Turbo V6	M	120	+15.149
5	Hypercar	51	(Italy) Ferrari AF Corse	(United Kingdom) James Calado (Italy) Antonio Giovinazzi (Italy) Alessandro Pier Guidi	Ferrari 499P	M	120	+22.619
5	Hypercar	51	(Italy) Ferrari AF Corse	(United Kingdom) James Calado (Italy) Antonio Giovinazzi (Italy) Alessandro Pier Guidi	Ferrari F163 3.0 L Turbo V6	M	120	+22.619
6	Hypercar	38	(United States) Cadillac Hertz Team Jota	(New Zealand) Earl Bamber (France) Sébastien Bourdais (United Kingdom) Jenson Button	Cadillac V-Series.R	M	120	+42.517
6	Hypercar	38	(United States) Cadillac Hertz Team Jota	(New Zealand) Earl Bamber (France) Sébastien Bourdais (United Kingdom) Jenson Button	Cadillac LMC55R 5.5 L V8	M	120	+42.517
7	Hypercar	83	(Italy) AF Corse	(United Kingdom) Phil Hanson (Poland) Robert Kubica (China) Yifei Ye	Ferrari 499P	M	120	+56.955s
7	Hypercar	83	(Italy) AF Corse	(United Kingdom) Phil Hanson (Poland) Robert Kubica (China) Yifei Ye	Ferrari F163 3.0 L Turbo V6	M	120	+56.955s
8	Hypercar	12	(United States) Cadillac Hertz Team Jota	(United Kingdom) Alex Lynn (France) Norman Nato (United Kingdom) Will Stevens	Cadillac V-Series.R	M	120	+1:10:816
8	Hypercar	12	(United States) Cadillac Hertz Team Jota	(United Kingdom) Alex Lynn (France) Norman Nato (United Kingdom) Will Stevens	Cadillac LMC55R 5.5 L V8	M	120	+1:10:816
9	Hypercar	8	(Japan) Toyota Gazoo Racing	(Switzerland) Sébastien Buemi (New Zealand) Brendon Hartley (Japan) Ryō Hirakawa	Toyota GR010 Hybrid	M	120	+1:14.615
9	Hypercar	8	(Japan) Toyota Gazoo Racing	(Switzerland) Sébastien Buemi (New Zealand) Brendon Hartley (Japan) Ryō Hirakawa	Toyota H8909 3.5 L Turbo V6	M	120	+1:14.615
10	Hypercar	5	(Germany) Porsche Penske Motorsport	(France) Mathieu Jaminet (France) Julien Andlauer (Denmark) Michael Christensen	Porsche 963	M	120	+1:21.117
10	Hypercar	5	(Germany) Porsche Penske Motorsport	(France) Mathieu Jaminet (France) Julien Andlauer (Denmark) Michael Christensen	Porsche 9RD 4.6 L Turbo V8	M	120	+1:21.117
11	Hypercar	35	(France) Alpine Endurance Team	(France) Paul-Loup Chatin (Austria) Ferdinand Habsburg (France) Charles Milesi	Alpine A424	M	120	+1:40.766
11	Hypercar	35	(France) Alpine Endurance Team	(France) Paul-Loup Chatin (Austria) Ferdinand Habsburg (France) Charles Milesi	Alpine V634 3.4 L Turbo V6	M	120	+1:40.766
12	Hypercar	15	(Germany) BMW M Team WRT	(Denmark) Kevin Magnussen (Switzerland) Raffaele Marciello (Belgium) Dries Vanthoor	BMW M Hybrid V8	M	119	+1 Lap
12	Hypercar	15	(Germany) BMW M Team WRT	(Denmark) Kevin Magnussen (Switzerland) Raffaele Marciello (Belgium) Dries Vanthoor	BMW P66/3 4.0 L Turbo V8	M	119	+1 Lap
13	Hypercar	99	(Germany) Proton Competition	(Switzerland) Neel Jani (Chile) Nico Pino (Argentina) Nicolás Varrone	Porsche 963	M	118	+2 Laps
13	Hypercar	99	(Germany) Proton Competition	(Switzerland) Neel Jani (Chile) Nico Pino (Argentina) Nicolás Varrone	Porsche 9RD 4.6 L Turbo V8	M	118	+2 Laps
14	Hypercar	7	(Japan) Toyota Gazoo Racing	(Japan) Kamui Kobayashi (Netherlands) Nyck de Vries (Argentina) José María López	Toyota GR010 Hybrid	M	116	+4 Laps
14	Hypercar	7	(Japan) Toyota Gazoo Racing	(Japan) Kamui Kobayashi (Netherlands) Nyck de Vries (Argentina) José María López	Toyota H8909 3.5 L Turbo V6	M	116	+4 Laps
15	Hypercar	36	(France) Alpine Endurance Team	(France) Jules Gounon (France) Frédéric Makowiecki (Germany) Mick Schumacher	Alpine A424	M	116	+4 Laps
15	Hypercar	36	(France) Alpine Endurance Team	(France) Jules Gounon (France) Frédéric Makowiecki (Germany) Mick Schumacher	Alpine V634 3.4 L Turbo V6	M	116	+4 Laps
16	**LMGT3**	**95**	**(United Kingdom) United Autosports**	**(Indonesia) Sean Gelael** **(United Kingdom) Darren Leung** **(Japan) Marino Sato**	**McLaren 720S GT3 Evo**	G	**115**	**+5 Laps‡**
16	**LMGT3**	**95**	**(United Kingdom) United Autosports**	**(Indonesia) Sean Gelael** **(United Kingdom) Darren Leung** **(Japan) Marino Sato**	**McLaren M840T 4.0 L Turbo V8**	G	**115**	**+5 Laps‡**
17	LMGT3	46	(Belgium) Team WRT	(Oman) Ahmad Al Harthy (Italy) Valentino Rossi (South Africa) Kelvin van der Linde	BMW M4 GT3	G	115	+5 Laps
17	LMGT3	46	(Belgium) Team WRT	(Oman) Ahmad Al Harthy (Italy) Valentino Rossi (South Africa) Kelvin van der Linde	BMW P58 3.0 L Turbo I6	G	115	+5 Laps
18	LMGT3	54	(Italy) Vista AF Corse	(Italy) Francesco Castellacci (Switzerland) Thomas Flohr (Italy) Davide Rigon	Ferrari 296 GT3	G	115	+5 Laps
18	LMGT3	54	(Italy) Vista AF Corse	(Italy) Francesco Castellacci (Switzerland) Thomas Flohr (Italy) Davide Rigon	Ferrari F163CE 3.0 L Turbo V6	G	115	+5 Laps
19	LMGT3	59	(United Kingdom) United Autosports	(France) Sébastien Baud (United Kingdom) James Cottingham (Switzerland) Grégoire Saucy	McLaren 720S GT3 Evo	G	115	+5 Laps
19	LMGT3	59	(United Kingdom) United Autosports	(France) Sébastien Baud (United Kingdom) James Cottingham (Switzerland) Grégoire Saucy	McLaren M840T 4.0 L Turbo V8	G	115	+5 Laps
20	LMGT3	27	(United States) Heart of Racing Team	(Italy) Mattia Drudi (United Kingdom) Ian James (Canada) Zacharie Robichon	Aston Martin Vantage AMR GT3 Evo	G	115	+5 Laps
20	LMGT3	27	(United States) Heart of Racing Team	(Italy) Mattia Drudi (United Kingdom) Ian James (Canada) Zacharie Robichon	Aston Martin M177 4.0 L Turbo V8	G	115	+5 Laps
21	LMGT3	77	(Germany) Proton Competition	(United Kingdom) Ben Barker (Portugal) Bernardo Sousa (United Kingdom) Ben Tuck	Ford Mustang GT3	G	115	+5 Laps
21	LMGT3	77	(Germany) Proton Competition	(United Kingdom) Ben Barker (Portugal) Bernardo Sousa (United Kingdom) Ben Tuck	Ford Coyote 5.4 L V8	G	115	+5 Laps
22	LMGT3	92	(Germany) Manthey 1st Phorm	(United States) Ryan Hardwick (Austria) Richard Lietz (Italy) Riccardo Pera	Porsche 911 GT3 R (992)	G	115	+5 Laps
22	LMGT3	92	(Germany) Manthey 1st Phorm	(United States) Ryan Hardwick (Austria) Richard Lietz (Italy) Riccardo Pera	Porsche M97/80 4.2 L Flat-6	G	115	+5 Laps
23	LMGT3	88	(Germany) Proton Competition	(Italy) Stefano Gattuso (Italy) Giammarco Levorato (Norway) Dennis Olsen	Ford Mustang GT3	G	115	+5 Laps
23	LMGT3	88	(Germany) Proton Competition	(Italy) Stefano Gattuso (Italy) Giammarco Levorato (Norway) Dennis Olsen	Ford Coyote 5.4 L V8	G	115	+5 Laps
24	LMGT3	31	(Belgium) The Bend Team WRT	Timur Boguslavskiy (Brazil) Augusto Farfus (Australia) Yasser Shahin	BMW M4 GT3	G	115	+5 Laps
24	LMGT3	31	(Belgium) The Bend Team WRT	Timur Boguslavskiy (Brazil) Augusto Farfus (Australia) Yasser Shahin	BMW P58 3.0 L Turbo I6	G	115	+5 Laps
25	LMGT3	60	(Italy) Iron Lynx	(United Kingdom) Andrew Gilbert (United Kingdom) Lorcan Hanafin (Spain) Fran Rueda	Mercedes-AMG GT3 Evo	G	115	+5 Laps
25	LMGT3	60	(Italy) Iron Lynx	(United Kingdom) Andrew Gilbert (United Kingdom) Lorcan Hanafin (Spain) Fran Rueda	Mercedes-AMG M159 6.2 L V8	G	115	+5 Laps
26	LMGT3	10	(France) Racing Spirit of Léman	(Brazil) Eduardo Barrichello (France) Valentin Hasse-Clot (United States) Derek DeBoer	Aston Martin Vantage AMR GT3 Evo	G	115	+5 Laps
26	LMGT3	10	(France) Racing Spirit of Léman	(Brazil) Eduardo Barrichello (France) Valentin Hasse-Clot (United States) Derek DeBoer	Aston Martin M177 4.0 L Turbo V8	G	115	+5 Laps
27	LMGT3	21	(Italy) Vista AF Corse	(France) François Heriau (United States) Simon Mann (Italy) Alessio Rovera	Ferrari 296 GT3	G	115	+5 Laps
27	LMGT3	21	(Italy) Vista AF Corse	(France) François Heriau (United States) Simon Mann (Italy) Alessio Rovera	Ferrari F163CE 3.0 L Turbo V6	G	115	+5 Laps
28	LMGT3	81	(United Kingdom) TF Sport	(Angola) Rui Andrade (Republic of Ireland) Charlie Eastwood (Belgium) Tom van Rompuy	Chevrolet Corvette Z06 GT3.R	G	114	+6 Laps
28	LMGT3	81	(United Kingdom) TF Sport	(Angola) Rui Andrade (Republic of Ireland) Charlie Eastwood (Belgium) Tom van Rompuy	Chevrolet LT6.R 5.5 L V8	G	114	+6 Laps
29	LMGT3	78	(France) Akkodis ASP Team	(United Kingdom) Ben Barnicoat (Germany) Finn Gehrsitz (France) Arnold Robin	Lexus RC F GT3	G	114	+6 Laps
29	LMGT3	78	(France) Akkodis ASP Team	(United Kingdom) Ben Barnicoat (Germany) Finn Gehrsitz (France) Arnold Robin	Lexus 2UR-GSE 5.4 L V8	G	114	+6 Laps
NC	LMGT3	61	(Italy) Iron Lynx	(Australia) Martin Berry (Netherlands) Lin Hodenius (Belgium) Maxime Martin	Mercedes-AMG GT3 Evo	G	85	
NC	LMGT3	61	(Italy) Iron Lynx	(Australia) Martin Berry (Netherlands) Lin Hodenius (Belgium) Maxime Martin	Mercedes-AMG M159 6.2 L V8	G	85	
NC	LMGT3	33	(United Kingdom) TF Sport	(United Kingdom) Jonny Edgar (Spain) Daniel Juncadella (United States) Ben Keating	Chevrolet Corvette Z06 GT3.R	G	76	
NC	LMGT3	33	(United Kingdom) TF Sport	(United Kingdom) Jonny Edgar (Spain) Daniel Juncadella (United States) Ben Keating	Chevrolet LT6.R 5.5 L V8	G	76	
NC	LMGT3	87	(France) Akkodis ASP Team	(United Kingdom) Jack Hawksworth (Austria) Clemens Schmid (Romania) Răzvan Umbrărescu	Lexus RC F GT3	G	72	
NC	LMGT3	87	(France) Akkodis ASP Team	(United Kingdom) Jack Hawksworth (Austria) Clemens Schmid (Romania) Răzvan Umbrărescu	Lexus 2UR-GSE 5.4 L V8	G	72	
NC	Hypercar	20	(Germany) BMW M Team WRT	(Netherlands) Robin Frijns (Germany) René Rast (South Africa) Sheldon van der Linde	BMW M Hybrid V8	M	13	Hybrid
NC	Hypercar	20	(Germany) BMW M Team WRT	(Netherlands) Robin Frijns (Germany) René Rast (South Africa) Sheldon van der Linde	BMW P66/3 4.0 L Turbo V8	M	13	Hybrid
Ret	LMGT3	85	(Italy) Iron Dames	(Switzerland) Rahel Frey (Denmark) Michelle Gatting (France) Célia Martin	Porsche 911 GT3 R (992)	G	113	Overheating
Ret	LMGT3	85	(Italy) Iron Dames	(Switzerland) Rahel Frey (Denmark) Michelle Gatting (France) Célia Martin	Porsche M97/80 4.2 L Flat-6	G	113	Overheating
Ret	Hypercar	009	(United Kingdom) Aston Martin THOR Team	(Spain) Alex Riberas (Denmark) Marco Sørensen	Aston Martin Valkyrie	M	106	Mechanical
Ret	Hypercar	009	(United Kingdom) Aston Martin THOR Team	(Spain) Alex Riberas (Denmark) Marco Sørensen	Aston Martin RA 6.5 L V12	M	106	Mechanical
Ret	Hypercar	007	(United Kingdom) Aston Martin THOR Team	(United Kingdom) Tom Gamble (United Kingdom) Harry Tincknell	Aston Martin Valkyrie	M	102	Mechanical
Ret	Hypercar	007	(United Kingdom) Aston Martin THOR Team	(United Kingdom) Tom Gamble (United Kingdom) Harry Tincknell	Aston Martin RA 6.5 L V12	M	102	Mechanical

FIA World Endurance Championship
Previous race: 6 Hours of São Paulo	2025 season	Next race: 6 Hours of Fuji
