= Aston Martin Racing =

Motorsports team

(United Kingdom) Aston Martin Racing − AMR
- Founded: 2004
- Team principal(s): Paul Howarth
- Current series: FIA World Endurance Championship; IMSA SportsCar Championship
- Former series: American Le Mans Series; Le Mans Series; GT4 European Cup
- Current drivers: World Endurance Championship; 007: (United Kingdom) Tom Gamble (United Kingdom) Ross Gunn (United Kingdom) Harry Tincknell; 009: (Canada) Roman De Angelis (Spain) Alex Riberas (Denmark) Marco Sørensen; IMSA SportsCar Championship; 23: (Canada) Roman De Angelis (United Kingdom) Ross Gunn (Spain) Alex Riberas
- Teams' Championships: FIA World Endurance Championship: 2014, 2016, 2017; Le Mans Series: 2009, 2016
- Drivers' Championships: FIA World Endurance Championship: 2013, 2014, 2016, 2017, 2019–20; Le Mans Series: 2009, 2016

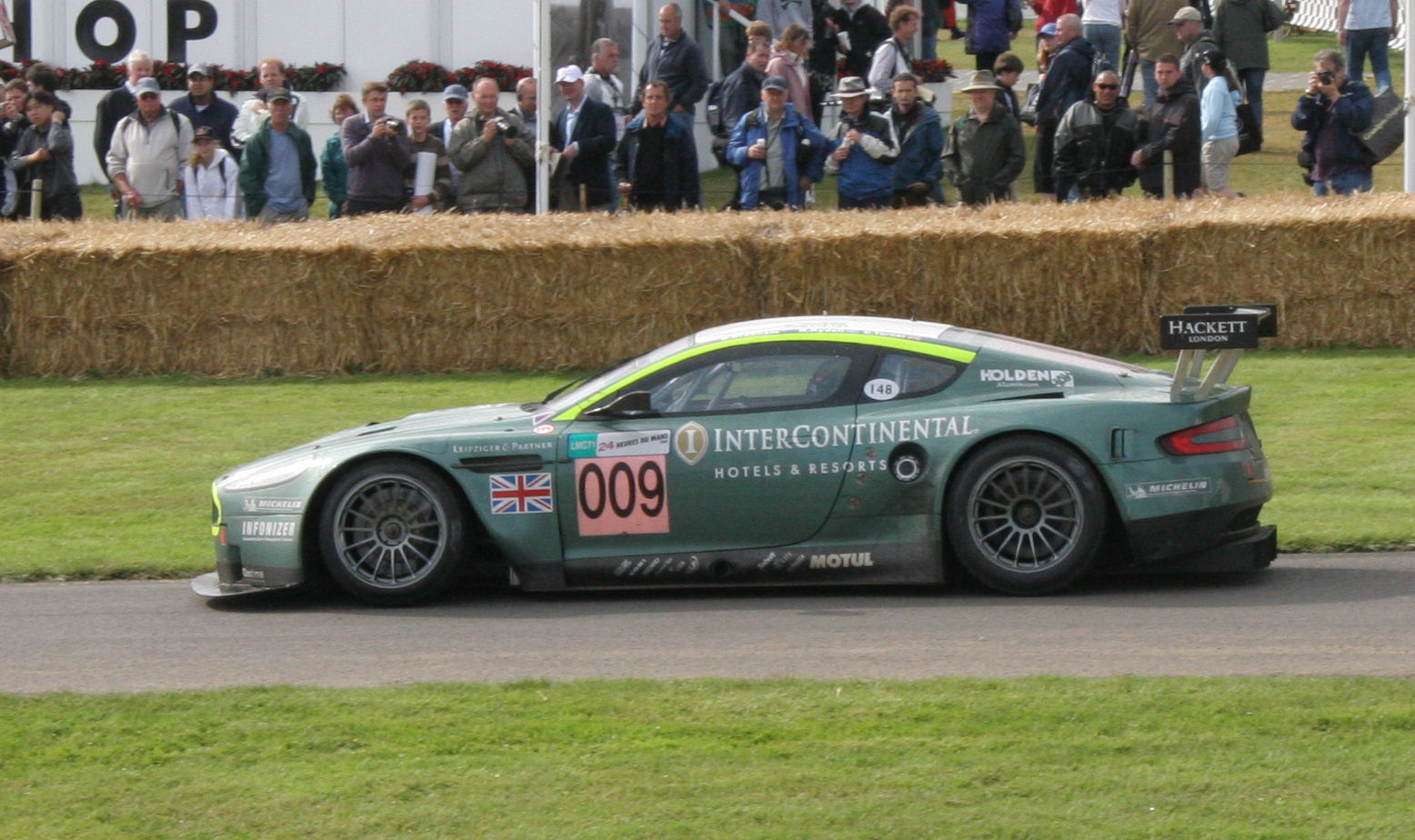
Aston Martin Racing's DBR9 which won the 2007 24 Hours of Le Mans LMGT1 Class

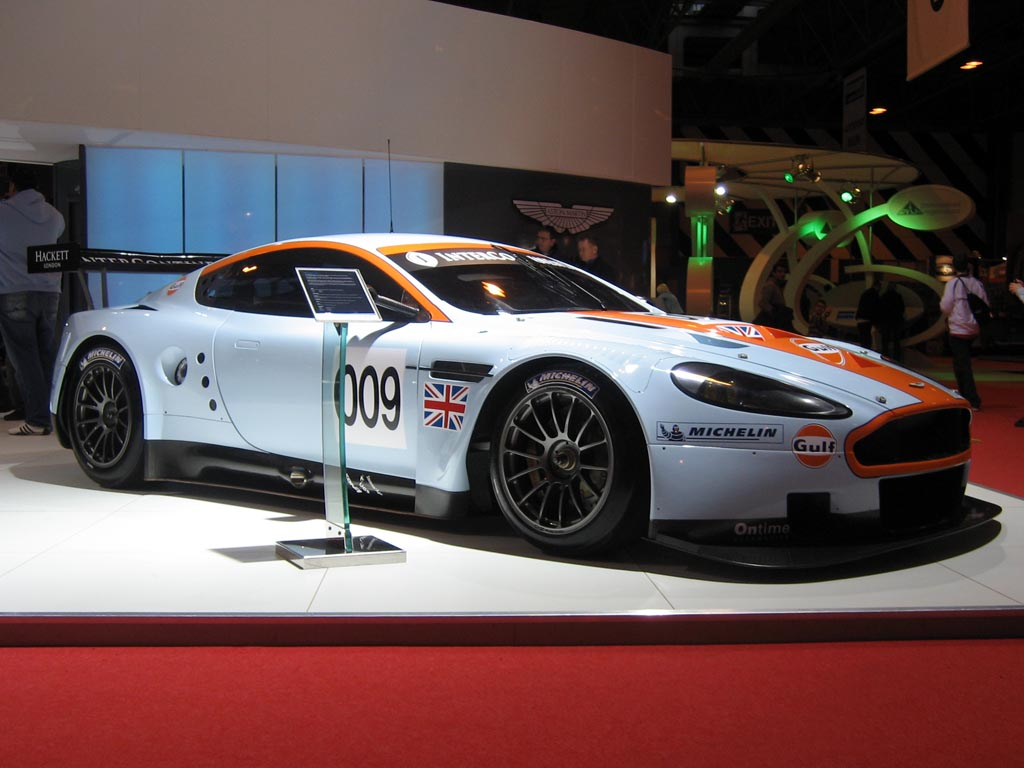
Sponsored by Gulf Oil, one of Aston Martin Racing's 2008 DBR9

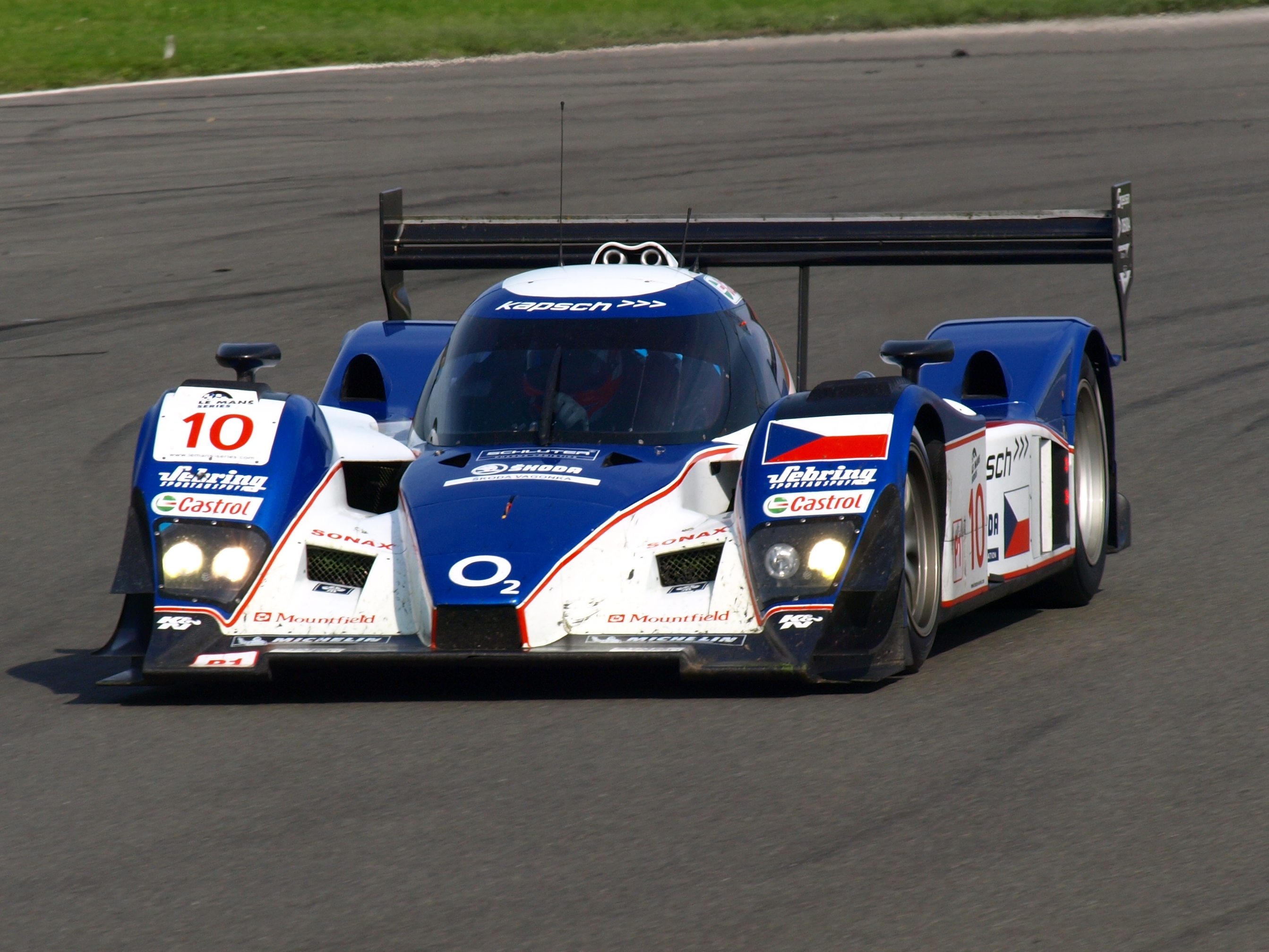
An Aston Martin-powered Lola B08/60 run by Charouz Racing System and backed by Aston Martin Racing

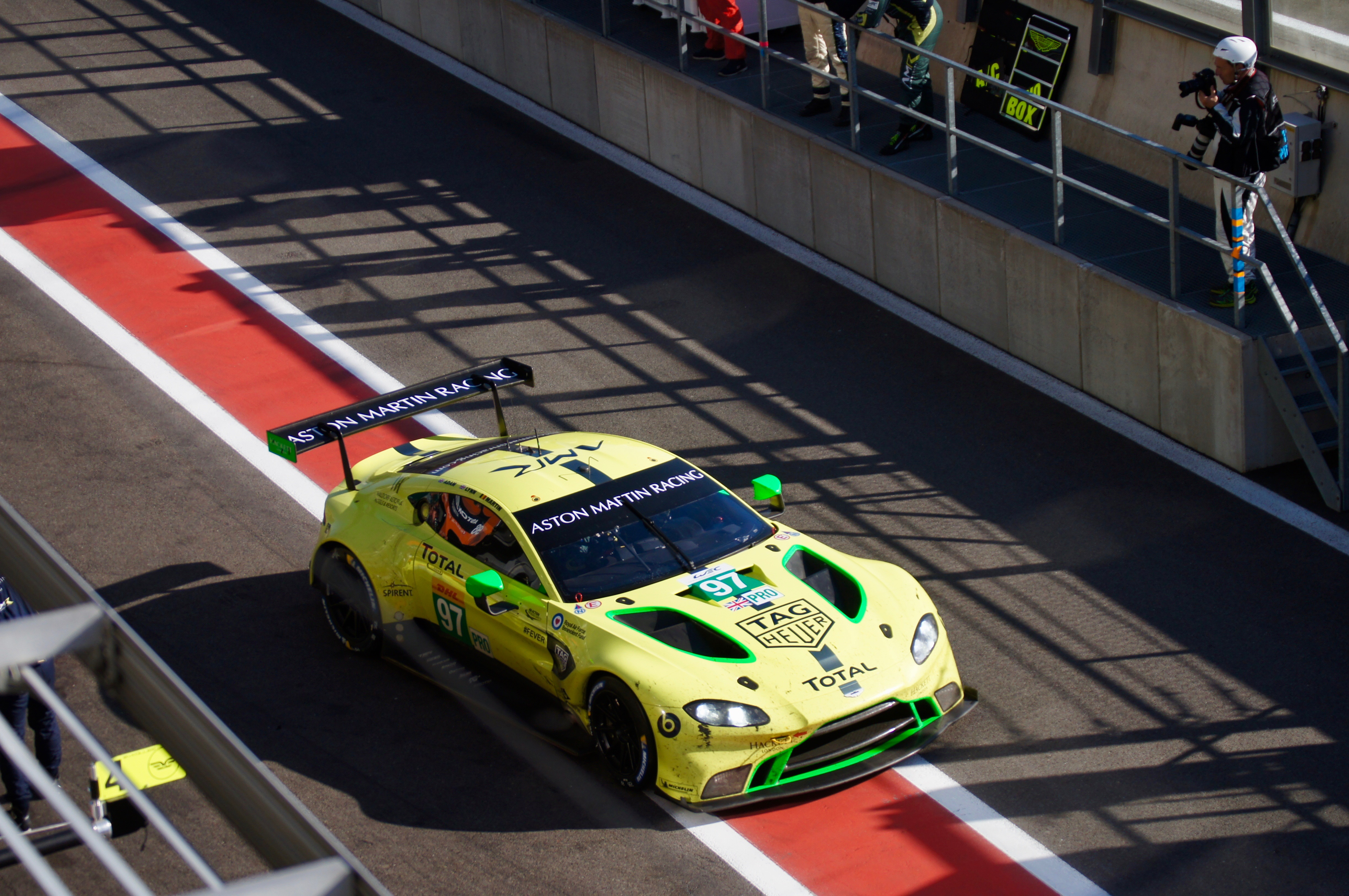
The new Aston Martin Vantage AMR which competes in the 2018–19 FIA World Endurance Championship

Aston Martin Racing also known simply as AMR is the name given to Aston Martin Lagonda's sports car racing interests, originally established in 2004 as a partnership between automobile manufacturer Aston Martin and engineering group Prodrive. The partnership was initially created for the purpose of returning Aston Martin to sports car racing with the DBR9, a heavily modified variant of the Aston Martin DB9. Since the DBR9's racing debut in 2005, Aston Martin Racing has expanded to build a variety of cars available to customers, as well as development of Aston Martin's V12 engine for Le Mans Prototype use. Aston Martin Racing's program has earned several successes over the years.

Although all cars are built by Prodrive at their factory, Aston Martin plays an integral part in designing the race cars, as well as integrating elements of the race cars back into Aston Martin's road cars.

On 23 April 2009, Aston Martin chairman and Prodrive founder David Richards announced his intent to return to Formula One in 2010 with the possibility of using the Aston Martin name, however this never materialised. Aston Martin had previously raced in the 1959 and 1960 Formula One seasons but failed to score points in either year.

In 2023, Aston Martin announced its intention to join the FIA World Endurance Championship and IMSA SportsCar Championship grids in 2025 with the Aston Martin Valkyrie AMR-LMH. The team currently runs two cars in the WEC hypercar class and one car in the IMSA GTP class in partnership with The Heart of Racing.

== Cars ==
Aston Martin Racing built cars for international grand tourer classes. The team itself ran a squad of DBR9s in the former top class, GT1, while other cars were offered to customers. The GTE class (formerly GT2) became their next target after the failure of the 2011 season, and the car is based on the V8 Vantage. The V8 Vantage also featured in GT3 and GT4 classes. Before the GT3 Vantage was introduced the DBRS9 solely raced in GT3.

In 2008, Aston Martin Racing entered into the Le Mans Prototype category with the aid of Charouz Racing System, installing a DBR9 V12 into a Lola B08/60 LMP1 prototype.

On 27 January 2009, the team announced a full works entry in the Le Mans Prototype category for the 2009 24 Hours of Le Mans with the Lola-Aston Martin B09/60. The entry marks the 50th anniversary of its last outright win at Le Mans. The 2009 programme got off to an unfortunate start at the pre-season Paul Ricard test on 8 March when Tomáš Enge destroyed the 007 car in an accident. Aston Martin Racing subsequently took delivery of a new Lola to replace the written off chassis. The team entered two LMP1 cars bearing the iconic blue and orange livery of Gulf Oil. The aim was to emulate the achievements of the 1959 race win with the DBR1 driven by Carroll Shelby and Roy Salvadori. At Le Mans the AMR Eastern Europe 007 car of Jan Charouz, Tomáš Enge and Stefan Mücke finished fourth behind the factory entries of Peugeot and Audi, as well as being the highest finishing petrol-fuelled car. The 008 car was running as high as 3rd overall in the morning until Anthony Davidson had a collision with a GT1 Aston. Subsequent repairs and a 5-minute stop and go penalty—for causing the collision—dropped the car out of contention. The 009 car was retired after 252 laps.

Three cars were also entered in the 2010 24 Hours of Le Mans, although only the 007 and 009 cars were run by Aston Martin Racing; the 008 car was run by the French team Signature-Plus. Both the 008 and 009 cars suffered from problems and had to be retired, leaving only the 007 to finish 6th overall and completing 365 laps, less than it did in 2009.

In 2011 the B09/60 was succeeded by the Aston Martin AMR-One, powered by a downsized, 2.0 litre turbocharged straight six petrol engine. Initially, the car was running very poorly. In its first racing event, the 2011 6 Hours of Castellet, it was only as fast as some of the LMP2 cars in qualifying and was plagued with mechanical issues. It completed only 96 laps. They then decided not to race it in the rounds of the Intercontinental Le Mans Cup leading up to Le Mans so they can continue private testing with the troubled car in order to sort out the mechanical issues. So around came Le Mans and despite the testing and extra car, they were still lapping in the middle of the LMP2 pack in qualifying and in the race it was much a much worse scenario. Car #009 retired after only two laps around the Circuit de la Sarthe and car #007 retired two laps later on lap four. Both cars completed a combined six laps at the 79th Grand Prix of Endurance. After this shocking result, the team raced the old B09/60 for the remainder of the season although a much downgraded version in order to comply with the new 2011 regulations.

For 2012, Aston Martin Racing returned to GT racing with the V8 Vantage GT2. They entered two cars at the 2012 24 Hours of Le Mans with one in the LMGTE-Pro class and one in the LMGTE-Am class. They also had a third Vantage in the GTE-Pro class as a reserve entrant. One of the existing AMR-One's has been sold to Pescarolo Sport who are set to compete with that car and naming it the Pescarolo 03. They will use an engine from Judd Power rather than the Aston Martin powerplant. The other AMR-One has formed the base for the new DeltaWing project which debuted at Le Mans in 2012 with Highcroft Racing. The DeltaWing uses the AMR-One's carbon fibre tub.

In 2013 to celebrate the centenary of the marque, the team entered two 2013 specification Aston Martin Vantage GTE's in the LMGTE PRO class and two 2012 specification Vantage GTE's in LMGTE AM. The team also competed in the full season of the FIA World Endurance Championship with the same cars. Ex-Formula 1 driver Bruno Senna joined the team for the season in one of the GTE Pro cars partnered by Frédéric Makowiecki and Rob Bell. The main GTE Pro car featured AMR regulars Darren Turner and Stefan Mücke joined by Peter Dumbreck for the 24 hours of Le Mans and the 6 Hours of Spa-Francorchamps.

On 21 November 2017, Aston Martin revealed the new Vantage: a successor to the biggest-selling road car in the British marque's history. In a synchronised launch, Aston Martin Racing revealed the new 2018 Vantage GTE: the new FIA World Endurance Championship challenger meant to replace the team's most successful competition car of all-time, the multiple Le Mans-winning V8 Vantage GTE. Aston Martin Racing confirmed it will race two brand new Vantage GTEs in the GTE Pro category of the 2018–19 WEC super season.

On 23 December 2020, Aston Martin Racing announced their decision to end their World Endurance Championship LMGTE Pro career and their Vantage GTE factory program in order to focus on their Formula One effort, as well as their LMGTE Am program, which will be funded by Paul Dalla Lana. On 24 April 2023, Dalla Lana retired from racing and withdrew his NorthWest AMR team with immediate effect a week before the 6 Hours of Spa. Heart of Racing took over the entry, but kept the NorthWest AMR name and number to conform with the championship regulations.

In October 2023, Aston Martin announced their Le Mans Hypercar project, with plans to enter the FIA World Endurance Championship and IMSA SportsCar Championship in 2025, in partnership with The Heart of Racing. The car, known as the Aston Martin Valkyrie AMR-LMH, uses a 6.5-litre Aston Martin-Cosworth RA V12 engine modified to meet the requirements of the Le Mans Hypercar division and ensure reliability during endurance races, and it has a 7-speed sequential manual gearbox developed by Xtrac.

== Factory drivers ==
=== Current ===
- (United Kingdom) Jonny Adam
- (Portugal) Henrique Chaves
- (Italy) Mattia Drudi
- (United Kingdom) Ross Gunn
- (France) Valentin Hasse-Clot
- (Norway) Christian Krognes
- (United Kingdom) David Pittard
- (Denmark) Marco Sørensen
- (Denmark) Nicki Thiim
- (United Kingdom) Darren Turner

== Results ==
Since the team's debut at the 2005 12 Hours of Sebring, Aston Martin Racing has earned several important victories in their career. Their very first race actually earned them their first victory, defeating the Corvette Racing squad at Sebring. The RAC Tourist Trophy was also won later that year.

For 2006, Aston Martin Racing entered the full American Le Mans Series season, earning five victories including the Petit Le Mans, and finishing second in the GT1 championship, three points shy of Corvette Racing. In 2007, Aston Martin earned their first victory at the 24 Hours of Le Mans since the company's overall win in 1959 by overcoming the Corvette squad. This feat was repeated once more in 2008 in GT1, while the team also had involvement in the Lola B08/60 LMP1 Coupe run under the Charouz Racing banner

For 2009 Aston Martin Racing entered two of their new prototypes along with Aston Martin Racing Eastern Europe which completed the works trio of DBR1-2 or Lola-Aston Martin B09/60. The team's greatest success with the new prototype came with the 2009 Le Mans Series (LMS) where in the first round in Barcelona the team won the 1000 km de Catalunya outright and with a string of podiums and a 1-2-3 sweep of the ADAC 1000 km Nürburgring and a podium at the Autosport 1000 km of Silverstone sealed the 2009 drivers title for 007 and Jan Charouz, Tomáš Enge, Stefan Mucke and the constructors title for Aston Martin-LOLA as well as the team title for Aston Martin Racing.

In 2012, Aston Martin Racing began racing in the FIA World Endurance Championship with the Aston Martin Vantage GTE, earning them several wins and titles. During the inaugural season of the FIA World Endurance Championship in 2012 Aston Martin Racing finished runner-up in the LMGTE Pro Trophy. In 2014 they won the FIA Endurance Trophy for LMGTE Am Teams and Drivers with Danish duo Kristian Poulsen and David Heinemeier Hansson. During the season they also won the 2014 24 Hours of Le Mans in the LMGTE Am category. In 2016 Aston Martin Racing managed to take the crown in the World Endurance Cup for GT Drivers with Nicki Thiim and Marco Sørensen. They also won the LMGTE Pro Teams’ championship. The 2017 season saw them win both the Drivers’ and Teams’ Championship in the GTE Am category. In June 2017 Aston Martin Racing also won the 2017 24 Hours of Le Mans in GTE Pro with Darren Turner, Jonny Adam and Daniel Serra driving the winning Aston Martin Vantage GTE.

In 2025, Aston Martin joined the FIA World Endurance Championship in the Hyperclass category with two cars. The season began with struggles, as the 007 car retired from the Qatar 1812 km with a transmission issue, and the 009 car finished 23 laps behind the leader. However, positive progress was made ahead of the car's 24 Hours of Le Mans debut, with the 009 car making Hyperpole 1 and both cars finishing the race in the top 15. In the IMSA SportsCar Championship, the 23 car missed the 2025 24 Hours of Daytona, but consistently finished within the top ten GTP cars in the opening half of the season.

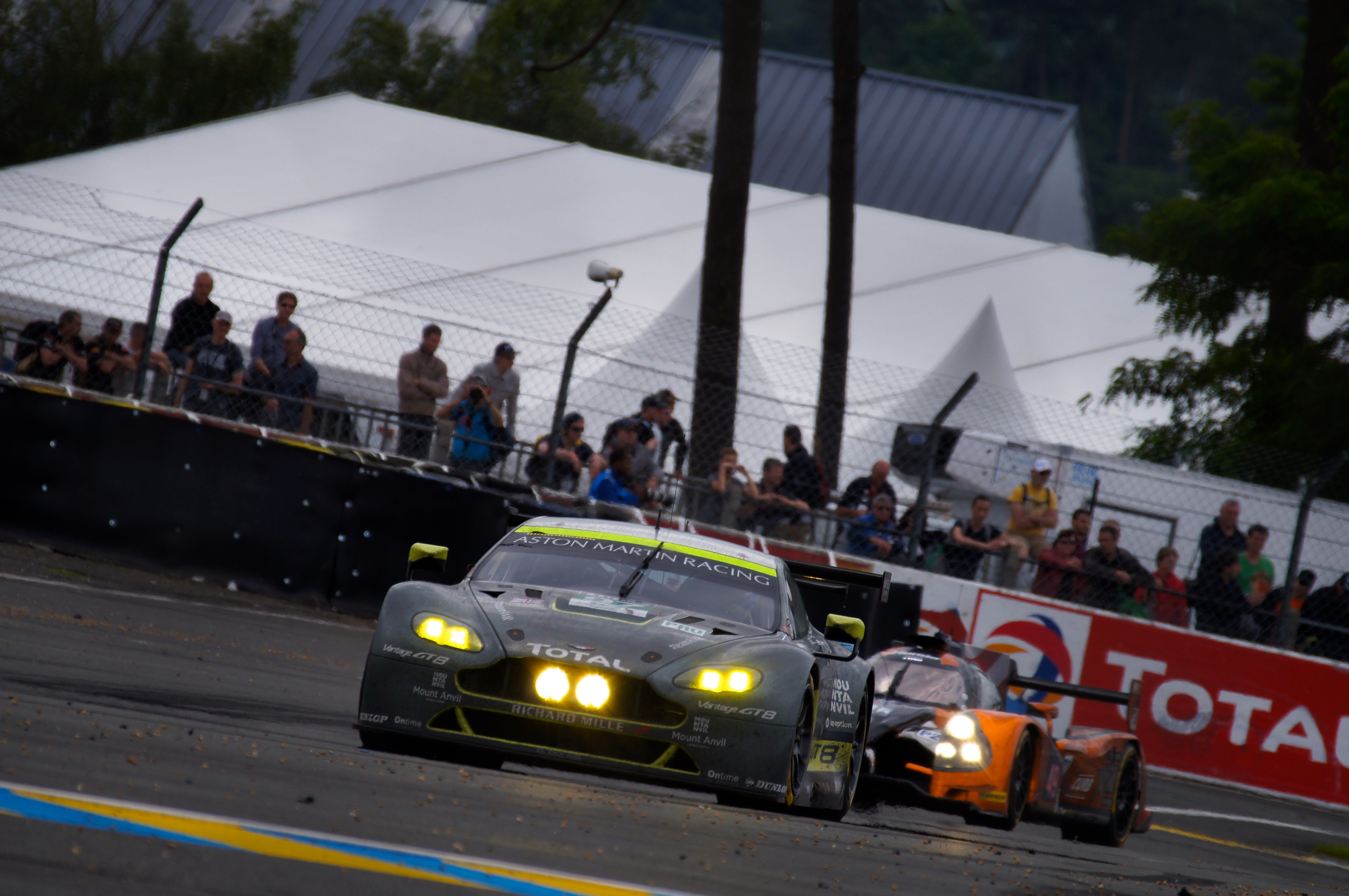
An Aston Martin Vantage GTE running in the 2016 24 Hours of Le Mans

=== 24 Hours of Le Mans results ===
Year	Entrant	No.	Car	Drivers	Class	Laps	Pos.	Class Pos.
2005	(United Kingdom) Aston Martin Racing	58	Aston Martin DBR9	(Czech Republic) Tomáš Enge (Netherlands) Peter Kox (Portugal) Pedro Lamy	LMGT1	327	DNF	DNF
2005	(United Kingdom) Aston Martin Racing	59	Aston Martin DBR9	(Australia) David Brabham (France) Stéphane Sarrazin (United Kingdom) Darren Turner	LMGT1	333	9th	3rd
2006	(United Kingdom) Aston Martin Racing	007	Aston Martin DBR9	(Czech Republic) Tomáš Enge (Italy) Andrea Piccini (United Kingdom) Darren Turner	LMGT1	350	6th	2nd
2006	(United Kingdom) Aston Martin Racing	009	Aston Martin DBR9	(Portugal) Pedro Lamy (Monaco) Stéphane Ortelli (France) Stéphane Sarrazin	LMGT1	342	10th	5th
2007	(United Kingdom) Aston Martin Racing	007	Aston Martin DBR9	(Czech Republic) Tomáš Enge (United Kingdom) Johnny Herbert (Netherlands) Peter Kox	LMGT1	337	9th	4th
2007	(United Kingdom) Aston Martin Racing	009	Aston Martin DBR9	(Australia) David Brabham (Sweden) Rickard Rydell (United Kingdom) Darren Turner	LMGT1	343	5th	1st
2007	(France) Aston Martin Racing Larbre	006	Aston Martin DBR9	(France) Roland Bervillé (France) Patrick Bornhauser (United Kingdom) Gregor Fisken	LMGT1	272	29th	13th
2007	(France) Aston Martin Racing Larbre	008	Aston Martin DBR9	(France) Christophe Bouchut (Denmark) Casper Elgaard (Italy) Fabrizio Gollin	LMGT1	341	7th	3rd
2007	(Italy) Aston Martin Racing BMS	100	Aston Martin DBR9	(Italy) Fabio Babini (United Kingdom) Jamie Davies (Italy) Matteo Malucelli	LMGT1	336	11th	6th
2008	(Czech Republic) Charouz Racing System (United Kingdom) Aston Martin Racing	10	Lola B08/60-Aston Martin	(Czech Republic) Jan Charouz (Czech Republic) Tomáš Enge (Germany) Stefan Mücke	LMP1	354	9th	9th
2008	(United Kingdom) Aston Martin Racing	007	Aston Martin DBR9	(Germany) Heinz-Harald Frentzen (Italy) Andrea Piccini (Austria) Karl Wendlinger	LMGT1	339	16th	4th
2008	(United Kingdom) Aston Martin Racing	009	Aston Martin DBR9	(Australia) David Brabham (Spain) Antonio García (United Kingdom) Darren Turner	LMGT1	344	13th	1st
2009	(Czech Republic) AMR Eastern Europe	007	Lola-Aston Martin B09/60	(Czech Republic) Jan Charouz (Czech Republic) Tomáš Enge (Germany) Stefan Mücke	LMP1	373	4th	4th
2009	(United Kingdom) Aston Martin Racing	008	Lola-Aston Martin B09/60	(United Kingdom) Anthony Davidson (United Kingdom) Darren Turner (Netherlands) Jos Verstappen	LMP1	342	13th	11th
2009	(United Kingdom) Aston Martin Racing	009	Lola-Aston Martin B09/60	(United Kingdom) Stuart Hall (Netherlands) Peter Kox (Switzerland) Harold Primat	LMP1	252	DNF	DNF
2010	(United Kingdom) Aston Martin Racing	007	Lola-Aston Martin B09/60	(Mexico) Adrián Fernández (Germany) Stefan Mücke (Switzerland) Harold Primat	LMP1	365	6th	5th
2010	(United Kingdom) Aston Martin Racing	009	Lola-Aston Martin B09/60	(Denmark) Juan Barazi (United Kingdom) Sam Hancock (United Kingdom) Darren Turner	LMP1	368	DNF	DNF
2010	(France) Signature Plus	008	Lola-Aston Martin B09/60	(Belgium) Vanina Ickx (France) Franck Mailleux (France) Pierre Ragues	LMP1	302	DNF	DNF
2010	(Germany) Young Driver AMR	52	Aston Martin DBR9	(Czech Republic) Tomáš Enge (Netherlands) Peter Kox (Denmark) Christoffer Nygaard	LMGT1	311	22nd	3rd
2011	(United Kingdom) Aston Martin Racing	007	Aston Martin AMR-One	(Austria) Christian Klien (Germany) Stefan Mücke (United Kingdom) Darren Turner	LMP1	4	DNF	DNF
2011	(United Kingdom) Aston Martin Racing	009	Aston Martin AMR-One	(Mexico) Adrián Fernández (United Kingdom) Andy Meyrick (Switzerland) Harold Primat	LMP1	2	DNF	DNF
2011	(Belgium) Kronos Racing (Belgium) Marc VDS Racing Team	22	Lola-Aston Martin B09/60	(Belgium) Vanina Ickx (Belgium) Bas Leinders (Belgium) Maxime Martin	LMP1	328	7th	7th
2011	(United Arab Emirates) Gulf AMR Middle East	60	Aston Martin Vantage GT2	(France) Fabien Giroix (Germany) Roald Goethe (United Kingdom) Michael Wainwright	LMGTE Am	141	DNF	DNF
2012	(United Kingdom) Aston Martin Racing	97	Aston Martin Vantage GTE	(Mexico) Adrián Fernández (Germany) Stefan Mücke (United Kingdom) Darren Turner	LMGTE Pro	332	19th	3rd
2012	(United Kingdom) Aston Martin Racing	99	Aston Martin Vantage GTE	(Denmark) Christoffer Nygaard (Denmark) Kristian Poulsen (Denmark) Allan Simonsen	LMGTE Am	31	DNF	DNF
2013	(United Kingdom) Aston Martin Racing	97	Aston Martin Vantage GTE	(United Kingdom) Peter Dumbreck (Germany) Stefan Mücke (United Kingdom) Darren Turner	LMGTE Pro	314	17th	3rd
2013	(United Kingdom) Aston Martin Racing	98	Aston Martin Vantage GTE	(United States) Bill Auberlen (Canada) Paul Dalla Lana (Portugal) Pedro Lamy	LMGTE Pro	221	DNF	DNF
2013	(United Kingdom) Aston Martin Racing	99	Aston Martin Vantage GTE	(United Kingdom) Rob Bell (France) Frédéric Makowiecki (Brazil) Bruno Senna	LMGTE Pro	248	DNF	DNF
2013	(United Kingdom) Aston Martin Racing	95	Aston Martin Vantage GTE	(Denmark) Christoffer Nygaard (Denmark) Kristian Poulsen (Denmark) Allan Simonsen	LMGTE Am	2	DNF	DNF
2013	(United Kingdom) Aston Martin Racing	96	Aston Martin Vantage GTE	(United Kingdom) Jamie Campbell-Walter (Germany) Roald Goethe (United Kingdom) Stuart Hall	LMGTE Am	301	30th	6th
2014	(United Kingdom) Aston Martin Racing	97	Aston Martin Vantage GTE	(Germany) Stefan Mücke (Brazil) Bruno Senna (United Kingdom) Darren Turner	LMGTE Pro	310	35th	6th
2014	(United Kingdom) Aston Martin Racing	99	Aston Martin Vantage GTE	(United Kingdom) Alex MacDowall (Hong Kong) Darryl O'Young (Brazil) Fernando Rees	LMGTE Pro	0	WD	WD
2014	(United Kingdom) Aston Martin Racing	95	Aston Martin Vantage GTE	(Denmark) David Heinemeier Hansson (Denmark) Kristian Poulsen (Denmark) Nicki Thiim	LMGTE Am	334	19th	1st
2014	(United Kingdom) Aston Martin Racing	98	Aston Martin Vantage GTE	(Canada) Paul Dalla Lana (Portugal) Pedro Lamy (Denmark) Christoffer Nygaard	LMGTE Am	329	26th	6th
2015	(United Kingdom) Aston Martin Racing V8	99	Aston Martin Vantage GTE	(United Kingdom) Alex MacDowall (Brazil) Fernando Rees (New Zealand) Richie Stanaway	LMGTE Pro	320	34th	6th
2015	(United Kingdom) Aston Martin Racing	95	Aston Martin Vantage GTE	(Denmark) Christoffer Nygaard (Denmark) Marco Sørensen (Denmark) Nicki Thiim	LMGTE Pro	330	27th	4th
2015	(United Kingdom) Aston Martin Racing	97	Aston Martin Vantage GTE	(United Kingdom) Rob Bell (Germany) Stefan Mücke (United Kingdom) Darren Turner	LMGTE Pro	110	DNF	DNF
2015	(United Kingdom) Aston Martin Racing	96	Aston Martin Vantage GTE	(Italy) Francesco Castellacci (Germany) Roald Goethe (United Kingdom) Stuart Hall	LMGTE Am	187	DNF	DNF
2015	(United Kingdom) Aston Martin Racing	98	Aston Martin Vantage GTE	(Canada) Paul Dalla Lana (Portugal) Pedro Lamy (Austria) Mathias Lauda	LMGTE Am	321	NC	NC
2016	(United Kingdom) Aston Martin Racing	95	Aston Martin Vantage GTE	(Denmark) Marco Sørensen (Denmark) Nicki Thiim (United Kingdom) Darren Turner	LMGTE Pro	338	23rd	5th
2016	(United Kingdom) Aston Martin Racing	97	Aston Martin Vantage GTE	(United Kingdom) Jonny Adam (Brazil) Fernando Rees (New Zealand) Richie Stanaway	LMGTE Pro	337	24th	6th
2016	(United Kingdom) Aston Martin Racing	98	Aston Martin Vantage GTE	(Canada) Paul Dalla Lana (Portugal) Pedro Lamy (Austria) Mathias Lauda	LMGTE Am	281	DNF	DNF
2016	(United Kingdom) Aston Martin Racing	99	Aston Martin Vantage GTE	(United Kingdom) Liam Griffin (Switzerland) Gary Hirsch (United Kingdom) Andrew Howard	LMGTE Am	318	36th	7th
2017	(United Kingdom) Aston Martin Racing	95	Aston Martin Vantage GTE	(Denmark) Marco Sørensen (New Zealand) Richie Stanaway (Denmark) Nicki Thiim	LMGTE Pro	334	25th	9th
2017	(United Kingdom) Aston Martin Racing	97	Aston Martin Vantage GTE	(United Kingdom) Jonny Adam (Brazil) Daniel Serra (United Kingdom) Darren Turner	LMGTE Pro	340	17th	1st
2017	(United Kingdom) Aston Martin Racing	98	Aston Martin Vantage GTE	(Canada) Paul Dalla Lana (Portugal) Pedro Lamy (Austria) Mathias Lauda	LMGTE Am	329	36th	8th
2017	(United Kingdom) Beechdean AMR	99	Aston Martin Vantage GTE	(United Kingdom) Oliver Bryant (United Kingdom) Ross Gunn (United Kingdom) Andrew Howard	LMGTE Am	331	30th	4th
2018	(United Kingdom) Aston Martin Racing	95	Aston Martin Vantage AMR	(Denmark) Marco Sørensen (Denmark) Nicki Thiim (United Kingdom) Darren Turner	LMGTE Pro	339	23rd	8th
2018	(United Kingdom) Aston Martin Racing	97	Aston Martin Vantage AMR	(United Kingdom) Jonny Adam (United Kingdom) Alex Lynn (Belgium) Maxime Martin	LMGTE Pro	327	37th	13th
2018	(United Kingdom) Aston Martin Racing	98	Aston Martin Vantage GTE	(Canada) Paul Dalla Lana (Portugal) Pedro Lamy (Austria) Mathias Lauda	LMGTE Am	92	DNF	DNF
2019	(United Kingdom) Aston Martin Racing	95	Aston Martin Vantage AMR	(Denmark) Marco Sørensen (Denmark) Nicki Thiim (United Kingdom) Darren Turner	LMGTE Pro	132	DNF	DNF
2019	(United Kingdom) Aston Martin Racing	97	Aston Martin Vantage AMR	(United Kingdom) Jonny Adam (United Kingdom) Alex Lynn (Belgium) Maxime Martin	LMGTE Pro	325	44th	12th
2019	(United Kingdom) Aston Martin Racing	98	Aston Martin Vantage GTE	(Canada) Paul Dalla Lana (Portugal) Pedro Lamy (Austria) Mathias Lauda	LMGTE Am	87	DNF	DNF
2020	(United Kingdom) Aston Martin Racing	95	Aston Martin Vantage AMR	(Denmark) Marco Sørensen (Denmark) Nicki Thiim (United Kingdom) Richard Westbrook	LMGTE Pro	343	22nd	3rd
2020	(United Kingdom) Aston Martin Racing	97	Aston Martin Vantage AMR	(United Kingdom) Alex Lynn (Belgium) Maxime Martin (United Kingdom) Harry Tincknell	LMGTE Pro	346	20th	1st
2020	(United Kingdom) Aston Martin Racing	98	Aston Martin Vantage AMR	(Canada) Paul Dalla Lana (Brazil) Augusto Farfus (United Kingdom) Ross Gunn	LMGTE Am	333	33rd	8th
2021	(United Kingdom) Aston Martin Racing	98	Aston Martin Vantage AMR	(Canada) Paul Dalla Lana (Brazil) Marcos Gomes (Denmark) Nicki Thiim	LMGTE Am	45	DNF	DNF
2022	(Canada) NorthWest AMR	98	Aston Martin Vantage AMR	(Canada) Paul Dalla Lana (United Kingdom) David Pittard (Denmark) Nicki Thiim	LMGTE Am	342	36th	3rd
2023	(Canada) NorthWest AMR (Note: Paul Dalla Lana retired from racing and withdrew his NorthWest AMR team with immediate effect a week before the 2023 6 Hours of Spa-Francorchamps. Heart of Racing took over the entry, but kept the NorthWest AMR name and number to conform with the FIA WEC championship regulations.)	98	Aston Martin Vantage AMR	(United Kingdom) Ian James (Italy) Daniel Mancinelli (Spain) Alex Riberas	LMGTE Am	310	33rd	6th
2024	(United States) Heart of Racing Team	27	Aston Martin Vantage AMR GT3 Evo	(United Kingdom) Ian James (Italy) Daniel Mancinelli (Spain) Alex Riberas	LMGT3	196	DNF	DNF
2024	(Japan) D'station Racing	777	Aston Martin Vantage AMR GT3 Evo	(France) Erwan Bastard (Japan) Satoshi Hoshino (Denmark) Marco Sørensen	LMGT3	279	36th	9th
2025	(United States) Aston Martin THOR Team	007	Aston Martin Valkyrie	(United Kingdom) Tom Gamble (United Kingdom) Ross Gunn (United Kingdom) Harry Tincknell	Hypercar	381	14th	14th
2025	(United States) Aston Martin THOR Team	009	Aston Martin Valkyrie	(Canada) Roman De Angelis (Spain) Alex Riberas (Denmark) Marco Sørensen	Hypercar	383	12th	12th
2025	(France) Racing Spirit of Léman	10	Aston Martin Vantage AMR GT3 Evo	(Brazil) Eduardo Barrichello (United States) Derek DeBoer (France) Valentin Hasse-Clot	LMGT3	336	45th	13th
2025	(United States) Heart of Racing Team	27	Aston Martin Vantage AMR GT3 Evo	(Italy) Mattia Drudi (United Kingdom) Ian James (Canada) Zacharie Robichon	LMGT3	341	36th	4th
2026	(United States) Aston Martin THOR Team	007	Aston Martin Valkyrie AMR	(United Kingdom) Tom Gamble (United Kingdom) Ross Gunn (United Kingdom) Harry Tincknell	Hypercar	379	8th	8th
2026	(United States) Aston Martin THOR Team	009	Aston Martin Valkyrie AMR	(Canada) Roman De Angelis (Spain) Alex Riberas (Denmark) Marco Sørensen	Hypercar	372	14th	14th
2026	(United States) Heart of Racing Team	23	Aston Martin Vantage AMR GT3 Evo	(United Kingdom) Jonny Adam (Brazil) Eduardo Barrichello (United States) Gray Newell	LMGT3	335	35th	3rd
2026	(United States) Heart of Racing Team	27	Aston Martin Vantage AMR GT3 Evo	(Italy) Mattia Drudi (United Kingdom) Ian James (Canada) Zacharie Robichon	LMGT3	291	DNF	DNF
2026	(France) Racing Spirit of Léman	59	Aston Martin Vantage AMR GT3 Evo	(France) Marius Fossard (France) Valentin Hasse-Clot (France) Clément Mateu	LMGT3	332	43rd	11th
