= Aston Martin Valkyrie AMR-LMH =

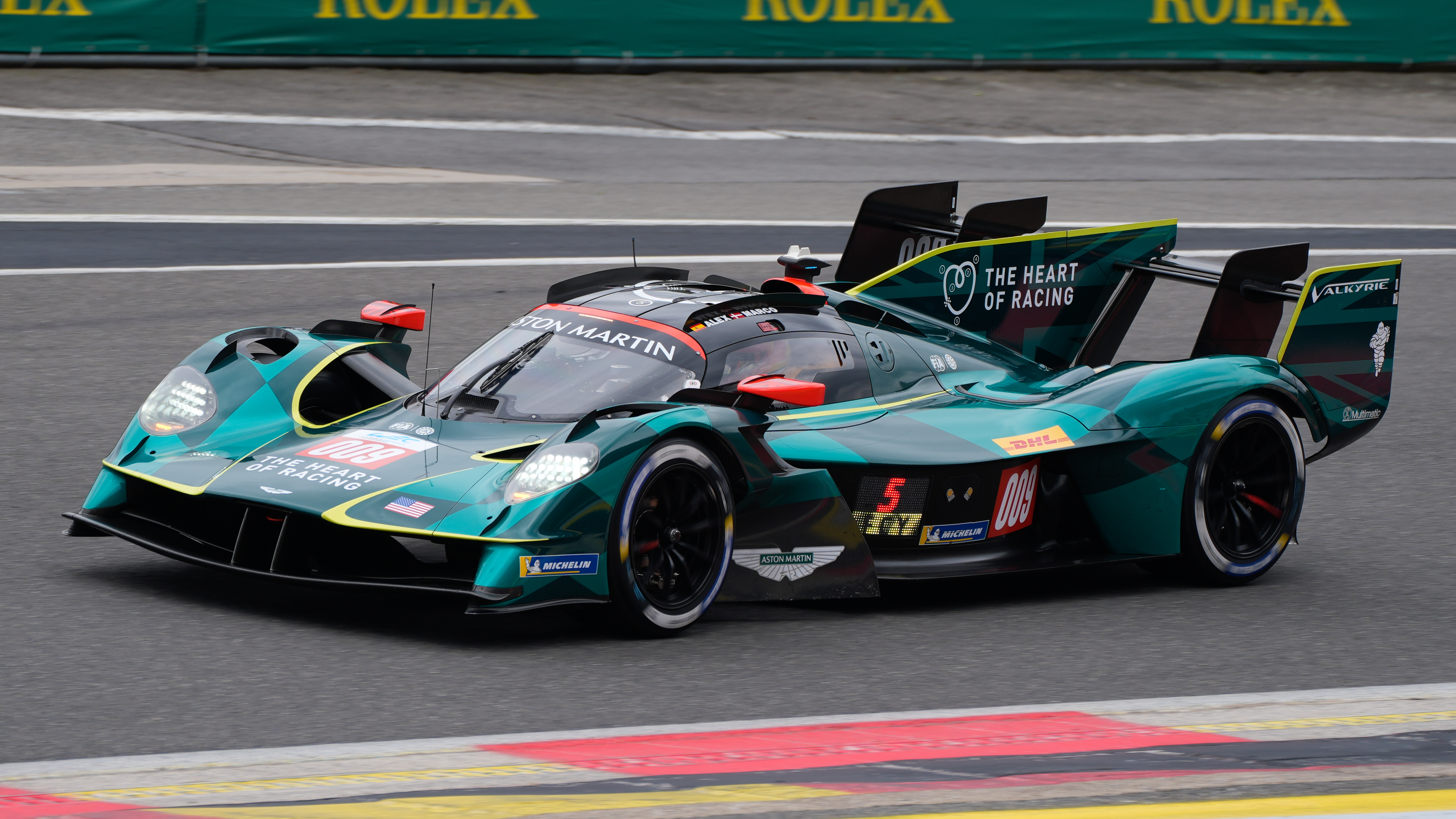
- Alex Riberas driving the No. 009 Valkyrie AMR-LMH at the 2026 6 Hours of Spa-Francorchamps
- Category: Le Mans Hypercar
- Constructor: Aston Martin (Multimatic)
- Designers: Marek Reichman (Chief Creative Officer); Miles Nurnberger (Director of Design); Adam Carter (Head of Endurance Motorsport)
- Predecessor: Aston Martin AMR-One

Technical specifications
- Engine: Aston Martin-Cosworth RA 6,499 cc (396.6 cu in) 65° V12 naturally aspirated, mid-mounted longitudinal
- Transmission: Xtrac 7-speed sequential manual
- Power: 500 kW; 680 PS (671 bhp)
- Fuel: TotalEnergies (WEC); VP Racing Fuels (IMSA)
- Lubricants: Mobil 1 0W-40 fully-synthetic motor oil
- Tyres: Michelin radial slicks with OZ one-piece forged alloys, 29/71-18 front and 34/71-18 rear

Competition history
- Notable entrants: (United Kingdom) (United States) Aston Martin THOR Team
- Notable drivers: (Canada) Roman De Angelis (United Kingdom) Tom Gamble (United Kingdom) Ross Gunn (Spain) Alex Riberas (Denmark) Marco Sørensen (United Kingdom) Harry Tincknell
- Debut: 2025 Qatar 1812 km
- Last event: 2026 6 Hours of Monza
Races	Wins	Podiums	Poles	F/Laps
33	0	1	0	0

The Aston Martin Valkyrie AMR-LMH, also referred to simply by its road car derivative, is a sports prototype developed by Aston Martin Racing and Multimatic to compete in the FIA World Endurance Championship in the Hypercar category and the IMSA SportsCar Championship in the GTP category, respectively. The car is a heavily modified racing version of the Aston Martin Valkyrie AMR Pro fitted to Le Mans Hypercar regulations and is, so far, the only car in its class derived from a preexisting production car.

The Valkyrie AMR-LMH made its debut at the 2025 Qatar 1812 km. The car was originally slated to make its first appearance at the 2025 24 Hours of Daytona; however, Aston Martin opted to skip the event in favour of completing more internal testing. It is the first sports prototype to race with a V12 engine in top-class endurance racing in 14 years, since the Peugeot 908 HDi FAP and the Lola-Aston Martin B09/60 each raced in 2011.

== Background ==
=== Initial plans ===
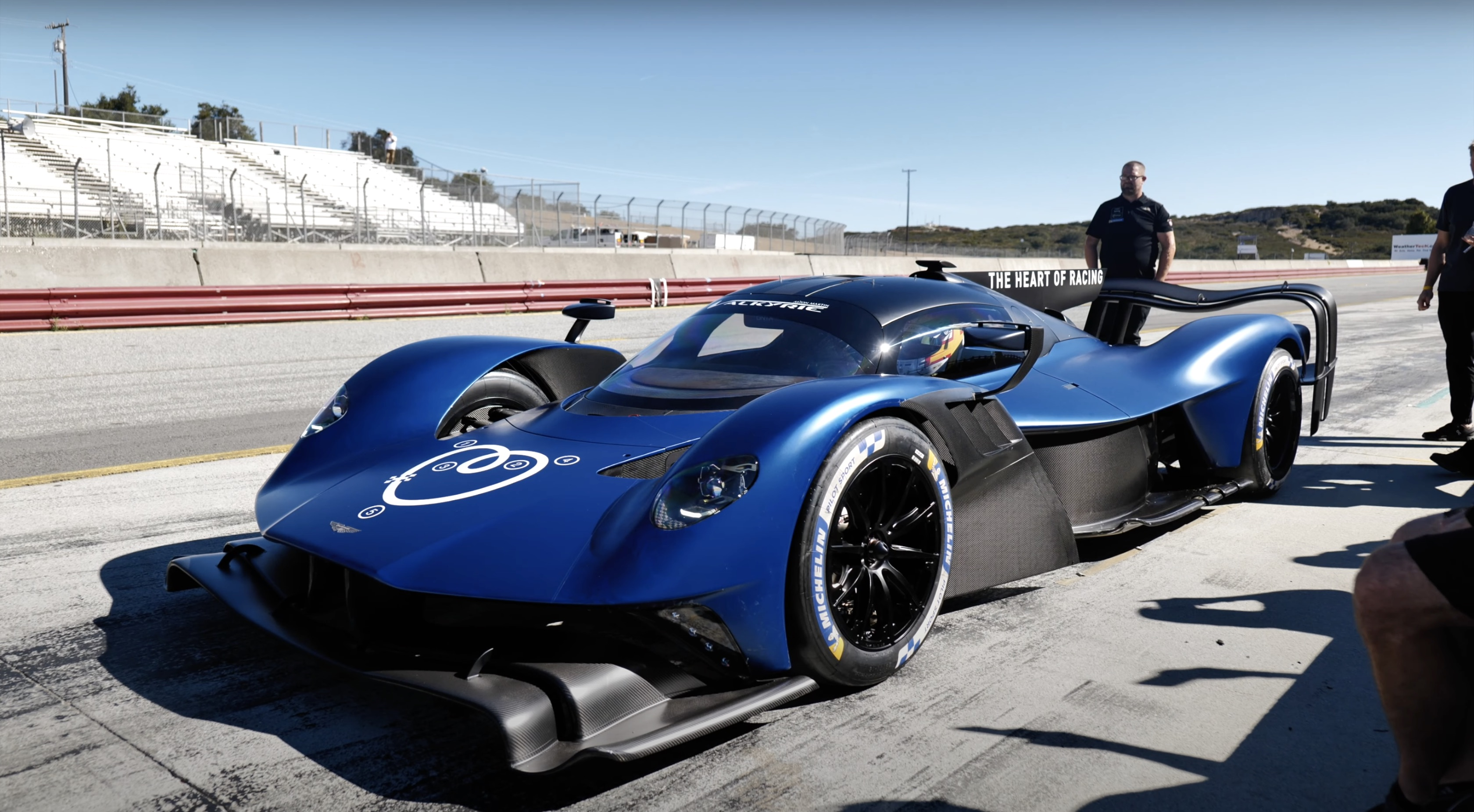
The Valkyrie AMR-LMH is based on the Aston Martin Valkyrie AMR Pro.

Aston Martin was one of the first manufacturers to commit to the Le Mans Hypercar class in 2019, with plans to start competition with at least two factory cars in the 2021 FIA World Endurance Championship. The car was planned to compete without a hybrid system, despite the road car containing one. Alongside the factory entries, which were to be fielded by Multimatic Motorsports, R-Motorsport were set to run two customer cars.

In February 2020, Aston Martin announced that they would be cancelling the project, citing the Automobile Club de l'Ouest's decision to allow LMDh sports cars to participate in the Hypercar class. The LMDh regulations were a more cost-effective solution for manufacturers, which meant customer racing programs were less expensive to invest in and running costs were viable for customer teams. The convergence of the two rulesets significantly impacted Aston Martin's financial model for the Valkyrie race car, as they had anticipated that sales of the Valkyrie to customer teams would constitute a substantial portion of the program's funding. According to Aston Martin executive David King, the development of the project had nearly progressed towards the construction of a fully operational model at the time, with testing set for spring that same year.

Around this time, Aston Martin had also joined Formula One for the first time in 61 years, which was followed by an internal restructuring of the British marque's racing division with a primary focus on the company's Formula One and LM GTE programmes. Despite Aston Martin's decision to pause the project, they remained open to future participation in the Hypercar class.

=== 2023 revival ===
The project was revived in October 2023. Aston Martin planned to enter at least one car in both the FIA World Endurance Championship and the IMSA SportsCar Championship in 2025, run by factory team The Heart of Racing. This made them the first Le Mans Hypercar manufacturer to enter the IMSA series, which up to that point only had LMDh cars participate.

Aston Martin continued with their original plan to compete without a hybrid system, stating unwanted complexity and extra weight, as Le Mans Hypercar regulations would have required heavily redesigning the Valkyrie to accommodate relocating the hybrid system from the rear axle to the front axle and installing the necessary cooling equipment. It uses the same 6.5-litre Cosworth RA V12 used by all versions of the Valkyrie sports car, but is extensively modified to run leaner in order to meet the Hypercar class performance window and to stay reliable throughout all stages of an endurance race. The gearbox is a 7-speed sequential manual developed by Xtrac. Despite not using a hybrid, the car is able to launch from a standstill without requiring engine power, using a combined starter and alternator motor system that Aston Martin calls a 'starternator'.

The car, officially named the Valkyrie AMR-LMH, was rolled out in the summer of 2024, ahead of an extensive testing program by Aston Martin and The Heart of Racing at Silverstone Circuit and Donington Park with drivers Darren Turner, Harry Tincknell, and Mario Farnbacher. The team also participated in sanctioned tests with the car later that year, testing at Bahrain International Circuit and Daytona respectively. In November 2024, Aston Martin announced that the car would make its global racing debut at the 2025 Qatar 1812 km, opting to skip the 2025 24 Hours of Daytona to perform further testing and development. They also announced that both cars that would be racing in the FIA World Endurance Championship would be using numbers #007 and #009, both taken from their Le Mans-winning Aston Martin DBR9.

=== Valkyrie LM ===
In celebration of their return to top class endurance racing at the 24 Hours of Le Mans, Aston Martin introduced an unrestricted track-only version of the Valkyrie AMR-LMH in June 2025 called the Valkyrie LM. The car is nearly identical to its racing counterpart, with a few mechanical changes, including the reconfiguration of the Cosworth V12 powertrain in order to use standard fuels and the removal of the ballast, muffler, and the mandated electronics required in both the FIA World Endurance Championship and the IMSA SportsCar Championship. It also comes equipped with a set of Pirelli tyres. Production is limited to 10 examples.

Through Aston Martin's 'Unleashed' program, owners of the Valkyrie LM are able to drive the car on different racing circuits worldwide with comprehensive support from Aston Martin engineers.

== Competition history ==
The driver lineups for all three cars were confirmed in February 2025, primarily consisting of experienced sports car racing drivers from Aston Martin Racing, The Heart of Racing, and Multimatic Motorsports. Two cars were entered for the FIA World Endurance Championship; the #007, driven by Harry Tincknell and Tom Gamble, and the #009, driven by Alex Riberas and Marco Sørensen. Ross Gunn and Roman De Angelis completed the #23 crew for the IMSA SportsCar Championship.

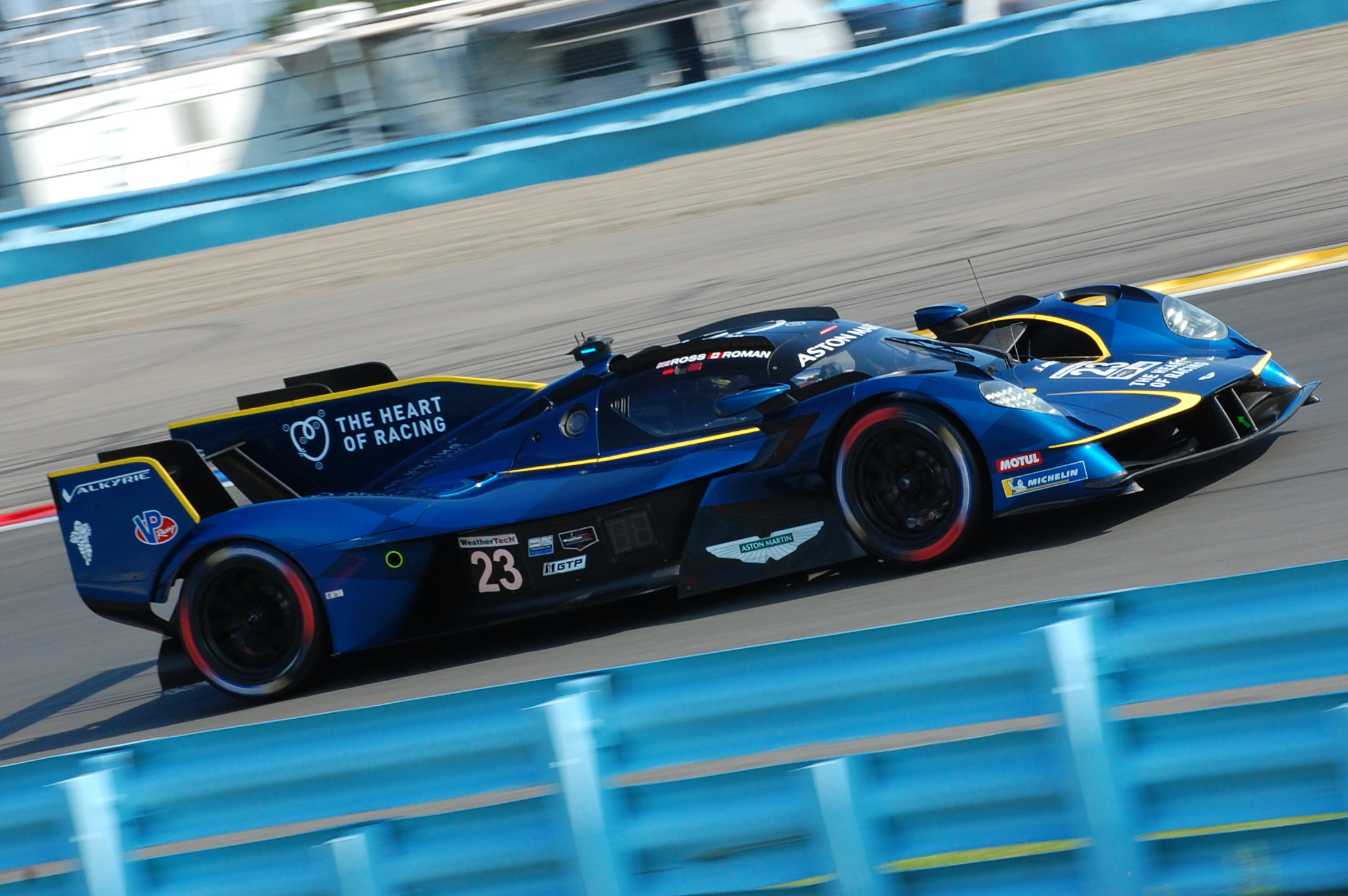
The No. 23 Valkyrie AMR-LMH during the 2025 Sahlen's Six Hours of The Glen.

The Valkyrie AMR-LMH endured a difficult debut at the 2025 Qatar 1812 km, with the #007 retiring with a transmission issue and the #009 completing the race 23 laps down, though the team remained encouraged by the car's potential. Positive progress continued following Qatar, recording top 10 finishes in every round of the first half of the IMSA season, running in points-scoring positions at the 2025 6 Hours of Spa-Francorchamps, and completing the 2025 24 Hours of Le Mans without mechanical issues. Aston Martin showed further competitiveness in subsequent races, including a 6th-place finish at the 2025 SportsCar Grand Prix, fighting in the top 5 at the 2025 Lone Star Le Mans before retiring due to overheating issues, and qualifying in 3rd before finishing 5th with the #009 in the 2025 6 Hours of Fuji. At the 2025 Petit Le Mans, the Valkyrie AMR-LMH scored its first podium finish in either series, finishing 2nd overall just five seconds behind the race-winning Cadillac. Mattia Drudi later drove the Valkyrie AMR-LMH in the FIA World Endurance Championship's post-season rookie test.

Performance saw an improvement in the Valkyrie's second competitive season, as the cars in both series saw stronger results on average. Aston Martin managed to secure personal best results in the FIA WEC with the Valkyrie AMR-LMH at the 2026 6 Hours of Spa-Francorchamps, 2026 Lone Star Le Mans, with car #007 finishing in 4th on both occasions.

== Racing results ==
=== Complete FIA World Endurance Championship results ===
Year	Entrant	Class	Drivers	No.	Rounds								Pts.	Pos.
Year	Entrant	Class	Drivers	No.	1	2	3	4	5	6	7	8	Pts.	Pos.
2025					QAT	IMO	SPA	LMN	SAO	COA	FUJ	BHR		
2025	Aston Martin THOR Team	Hypercar	(United Kingdom) Tom Gamble	007	Ret	18	13	14	16	Ret	Ret	15	24	8th
2025	Aston Martin THOR Team	Hypercar	(United Kingdom) Harry Tincknell	007	Ret	18	13	14	16	Ret	Ret	15	24	8th
2025	Aston Martin THOR Team	Hypercar	(United Kingdom) Ross Gunn	007	Ret			14				15	24	8th
2025	Aston Martin THOR Team	Hypercar	(Spain) Alex Riberas	009	17	17	14	12	13	Ret	5	7	24	8th
2025	Aston Martin THOR Team	Hypercar	(Denmark) Marco Sørensen	009	17	17	14	12	13	Ret	5	7	24	8th
2025	Aston Martin THOR Team	Hypercar	(Canada) Roman De Angelis	009	17			12				7	24	8th
2026*					IMO	SPA	LMN	SÃO	COA	FUJ	CAT	MNZ		
2026*	Aston Martin THOR Team	Hypercar	(United Kingdom) Tom Gamble	007	9	4	8	6	4	14	Ret	12	52	6th
2026*	Aston Martin THOR Team	Hypercar	(United Kingdom) Harry Tincknell	007	9	4	8	6	4	14	Ret	12	52	6th
2026*	Aston Martin THOR Team	Hypercar	(United Kingdom) Ross Gunn	007			8						52	6th
2026*	Aston Martin THOR Team	Hypercar	(Spain) Alex Riberas	009	14	Ret	14	9	14	9	9	14	52	6th
2026*	Aston Martin THOR Team	Hypercar	(Denmark) Marco Sørensen	009	14	Ret	14	9	14	9	9	14	52	6th
2026*	Aston Martin THOR Team	Hypercar	(Canada) Roman De Angelis	009			14						52	6th

* Season in progress.

=== Complete IMSA SportsCar Championship results ===
Year	Entrant	Class	Drivers	No.	Rounds									Pts.	Pos.
Year	Entrant	Class	Drivers	No.	1	2	3	4	5	6	7	8	9	Pts.	Pos.
2025					DAY	SEB	LBH	LGA	DET	WGL	ELK	IMS	ATL		
2025	Aston Martin THOR Team	GTP	(Canada) Roman De Angelis	23	—	9	8	10	8	10	6	11	2	2049	11th
2025	Aston Martin THOR Team	GTP	(United Kingdom) Ross Gunn	23	—	9	8	10	8	10	6	11	2	2049	11th
2025	Aston Martin THOR Team	GTP	(Spain) Alex Riberas	23	—	9							2	2049	11th
2026					DAY	SEB	LBH	LGA	DET	WGL	ELK	IMS	ATL		
2026	Aston Martin THOR Team	GTP	(Canada) Roman De Angelis	23	10	9	9	8	10	Ret	5	8	5	2242	11th
2026	Aston Martin THOR Team	GTP	(United Kingdom) Ross Gunn	23	10	9	9	8	10	Ret	5	8	5	2242	11th
2026	Aston Martin THOR Team	GTP	(Spain) Alex Riberas	23	10	9							5	2242	11th
2026	Aston Martin THOR Team	GTP	(Denmark) Marco Sørensen	23	10									2242	11th

* Season in progress.

=== Complete IMSA Michelin Endurance Cup results ===
Year	Entrant	Class	Drivers	No.	Rounds					Pts.	Pos.
Year	Entrant	Class	Drivers	No.	1	2	3	4	5	Pts.	Pos.
2025					DAY	SEB	WGL	IMS	ATL		
2025	Aston Martin THOR Team	GTP	(Canada) Roman De Angelis	23	—	9	10	11	2	22	12th
2025	Aston Martin THOR Team	GTP	(United Kingdom) Ross Gunn	23	—	9	10	11	2	22	12th
2025	Aston Martin THOR Team	GTP	(Spain) Alex Riberas	23	—	9			2	22	12th
2026*					DAY	SEB	WGL	ELK	ATL		
2026*	Aston Martin THOR Team	GTP	(Canada) Roman De Angelis	23	10	9	Ret	5	5	28	11th
2026*	Aston Martin THOR Team	GTP	(United Kingdom) Ross Gunn	23	10	9	Ret	5	5	28	11th
2026*	Aston Martin THOR Team	GTP	(Spain) Alex Riberas	23	10	9			5	28	11th
2026*	Aston Martin THOR Team	GTP	(Denmark) Marco Sørensen	23	10					28	11th

* Season in progress.

== See also ==
- Aston Martin Valkyrie
