= Aston Martin Valhalla =

Mid-engine hybrid sports car

- 2026 Aston Martin Valhalla pictured at the 2026 Adelaide Auto Expo

Overview
- Manufacturer: Aston Martin Lagonda plc
- Also called: Aston Martin AM-RB 003 (developmental name)
- Production: 2019 (AM-RB 003 prototype); 2025–present
- Model years: 2026
- Assembly: United Kingdom: Gaydon, Warwickshire
- Designer: Miles Nurnberger; Adrian Newey

Body and chassis
- Class: Sports car (S)
- Body style: 2-door coupé; 2-door Targa top roadster
- Layout: Mid engine, AWD
- Doors: Dihedral
- Related: Aston Martin Valkyrie

Powertrain
- Engine: 3,982 cubic centimetres (243.0 cu in) Mercedes-AMG M178 LS2 twin-turbocharged V8 (production model)
- Electric motor: 3x permanent magnet synchronous electric motors (1 Rear and 2 Front)
- Power output: 1,064 bhp (793 kW; 1,079 PS); 1,100 newton-metres (810 lbf⋅ft)
- Transmission: 8-speed Graziano dual clutch
- Hybrid drivetrain: PHEV
- Battery: 150kW/400V/6.1kWh hybrid battery system

Dimensions
- Wheelbase: 2,760 mm (108.7 in)
- Length: 4,748 mm (186.9 in)
- Width: 2,014 mm (79.3 in)
- Height: 1,161 mm (45.7 in)
- Kerb weight: 1,655 kg (3,649 lb) (dry); 1,914 kg (4,219 lb) (kerb)

The Aston Martin Valhalla is a sports car developed by British manufacturer Aston Martin in collaboration with Red Bull Racing. The mid-engined car has a plug-in hybrid powertrain and is meant to sit below the flagship Valkyrie track-focused sports car and is intended to be more usable as an everyday car.

An open-top version known as the Valhalla Spider was officially revealed on 28 October 2026.

== Overview ==
The car is a result of the collaboration between Aston Martin and Red Bull Racing. Initially called AM-RB 003, the project name for the car was revealed to be the "Son of Valkyrie" at the car's public introduction as it uses many technologies first implemented in the Valkyrie. The final name of the car was revealed to be Valhalla. Namewise, the Valhalla follows numerous previous Aston Martin models tradition of starting with the letter "V". Like the Valkyrie, the name "Valhalla" also has its origin in Norse mythology.

The concept's aero design was a unique FlexFoil rear wing. The wing could change the car's downforce without changing its angle of attack; it is integrated into the bodywork and is claimed to generate no drag or aerodynamic turbulence.

The concept's interior has space for storing luggage behind the seats, a centre console and a phone mount for the driver. The car shares the race-inspired steering wheel from the Valkyrie and features unique wing shaped paddle shifters on the steering column. The car also has dihedral doors for easy entry and exit.

The chassis is a variation of the carbon fibre monocoque chassis of the Valkyrie with the body panels being produced from the same material. The chassis will be produced by Aston Martin while the aerodynamic body panels will be produced at Red Bull Racing. The car is planned to weigh less than 1,550 kg (3,417 lb).

When initially announced, the car was planned to use a 3.0L twin-turbocharged V6 engine as opposed to the V12 on the Valkyrie but would share the KERS system from the flagship sports car. A combined output of those two would be around 1,000 PS (735 kW; 986 hp). The engine was intended to be designed and developed in-house by the company and will use the Castrol Nexcel 90-second oil change system first used in the track-only Vulcan. The car is the first road car to use such a system. The exhaust system uses dual outlets which are placed on top of the car, similar to the Porsche 918 Spyder. However, in July 2021, the Valhalla's production form debuted and featured an extensive redesign from the concept form, including switching engines from the in-house V6 to the Mercedes-AMG M178 LS2 4.0-liter twin-turbocharged V8 in conjunction with two electric motors, among many other changes. The new powertrain will develop 950 PS (699 kW; 937 hp).

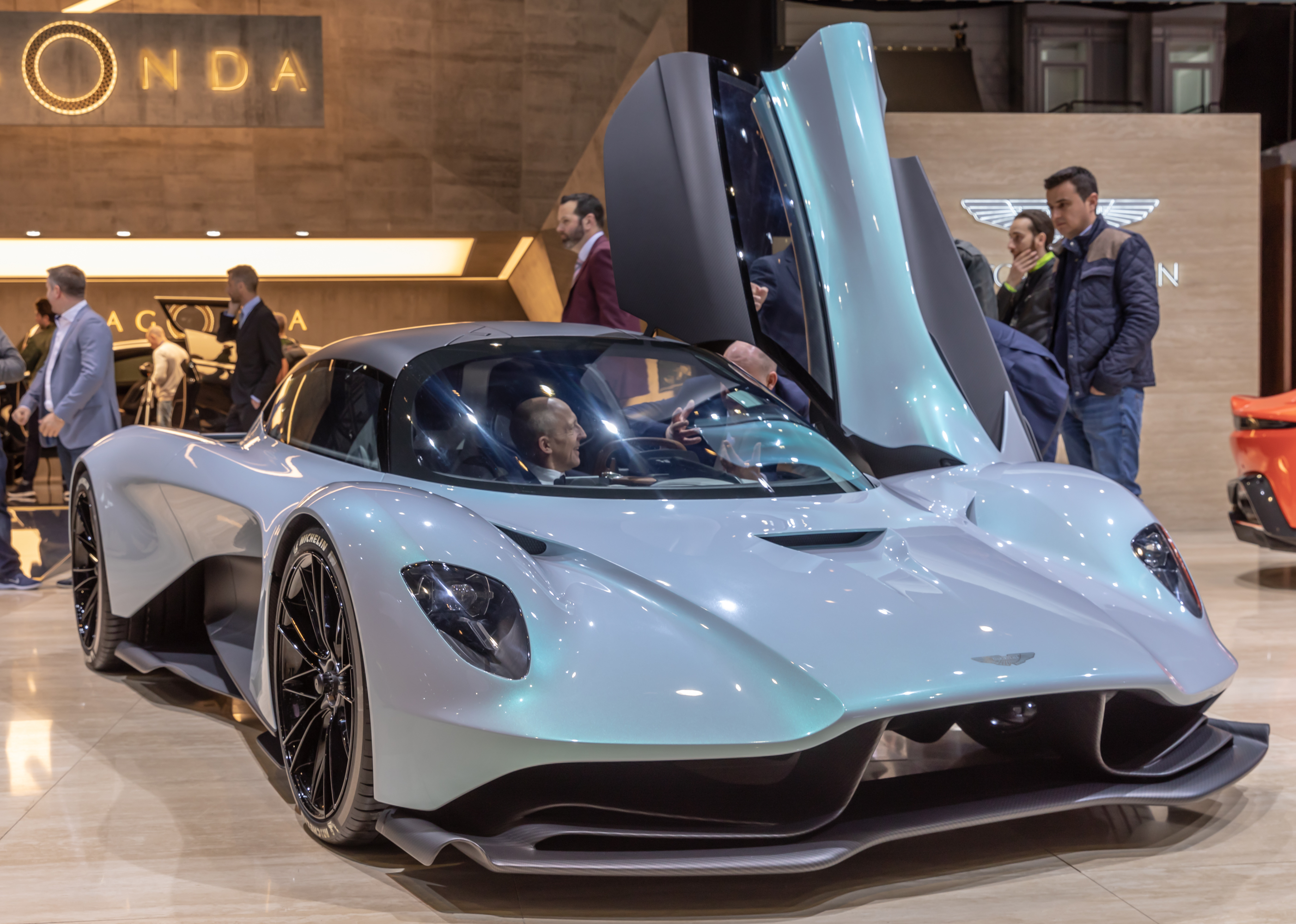
The AM-RB 003 concept car on display at the 2019 Geneva Motor Show

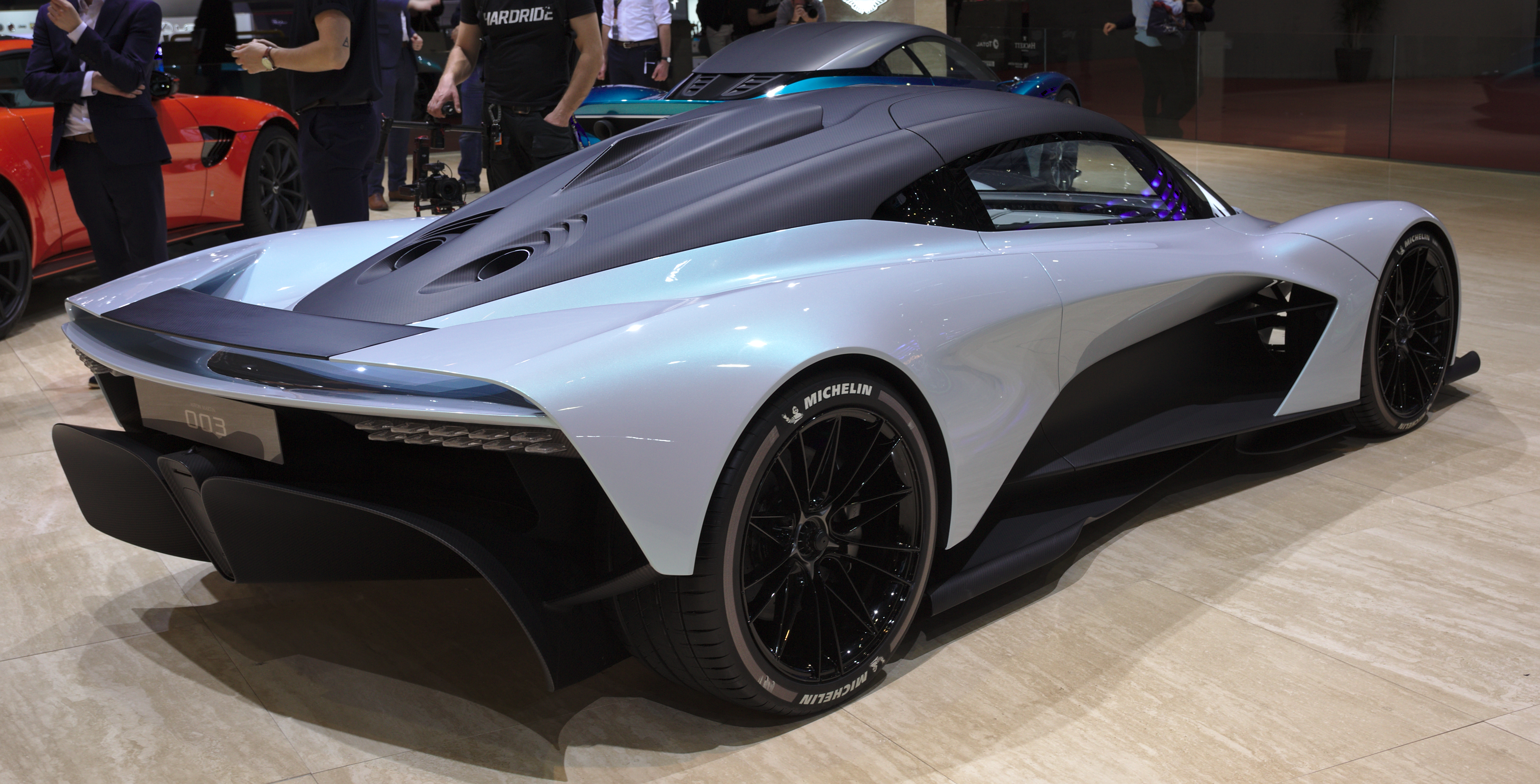
AM-RB 003 rear view

2025 Aston Martin Valhalla

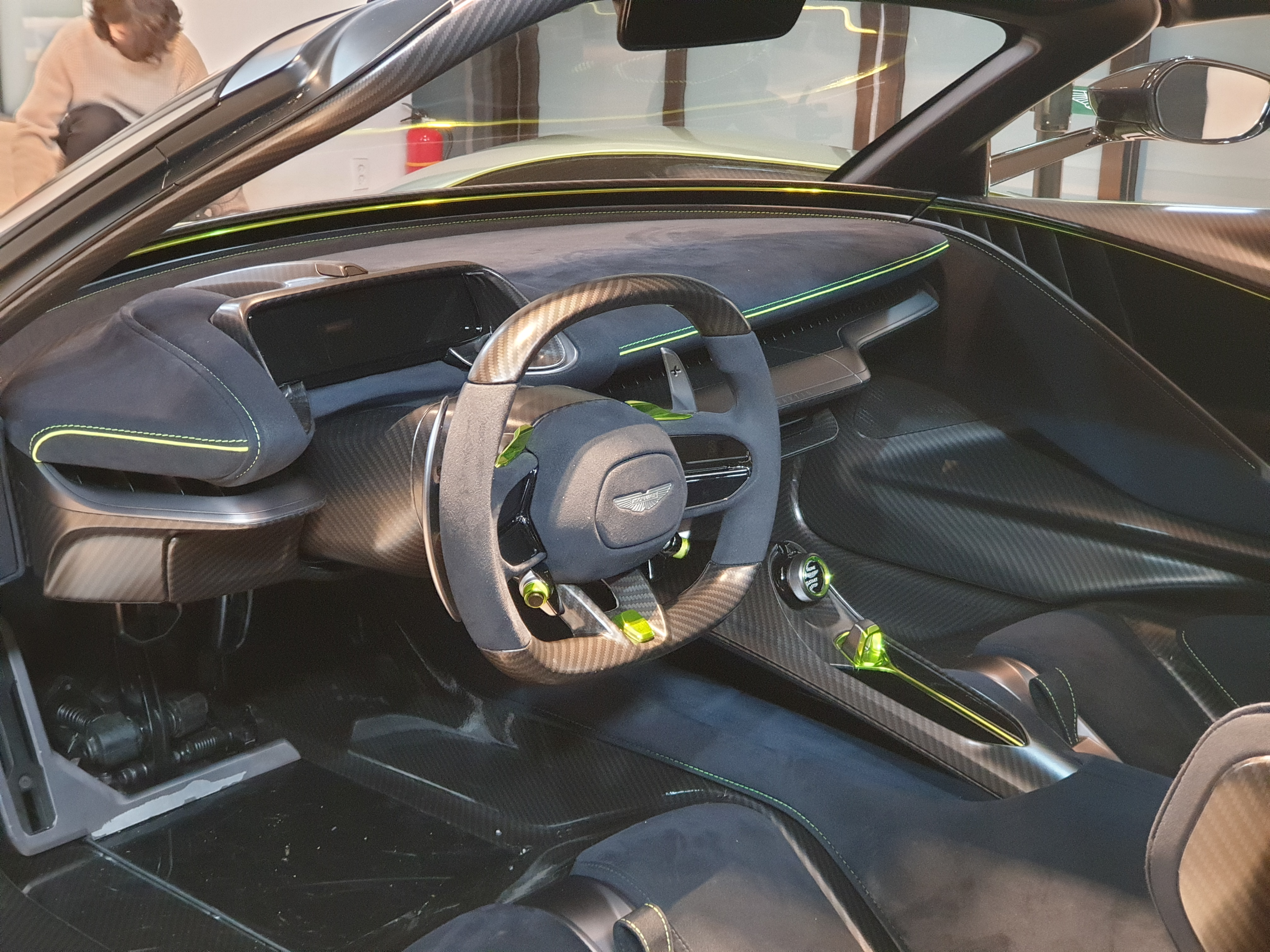
AM-RB 003 Interior

== Production ==
The car entered in production in 2025. It was originally slated for a limited production run of 500 examples starting at $1,000,000 in late 2021. However, as of August 2021, the Valhalla will be limited to 999 examples with an estimated price of US$800,000 (GB£580,000). The first customer car was delivered in December 2025 in the United Kingdom.

== Appearances in media ==
The Valhalla appears briefly, sitting in a wind tunnel at Q-Branch in the James Bond film No Time to Die, though the vehicle itself is not used. A 2019 version of the concept car also appears in Forza Horizon 5 and 6 and Forza Motorsport. A modified version of the production model is featured in the 2026 video game 007 First Light.

== See also ==
- List of production cars by power output
