= Cosworth RA =

Hybrid V12 engine

Overview
- Manufacturer: (United Kingdom) Cosworth
- Production: 2021–present

Layout
- Configuration: V12, naturally-aspirated, 65° cylinder angle
- Displacement: 6.5 L (6,499 cc)
- Cylinder bore: 98 mm (3.86 in)
- Piston stroke: 71.8 mm (2.83 in)
- Cylinder block material: Aluminum alloy
- Cylinder head material: Aluminum alloy
- Valvetrain: 48-valve, DOHC, four-valves per cylinder

Combustion
- Fuel system: Port injection
- Management: Cosworth Antares 8
- Oil system: Dry sump
- Cooling system: water-cooled – twin-aluminium front radiators

Output
- Power output: 1,000 hp (746 kW) at 10,500 rpm
- Torque output: 546 lb⋅ft (740 N⋅m) at 7,000 rpm

Dimensions
- Dry weight: 206 kg (454.2 lb)

The RA is a 6.5-litre, naturally-aspirated V12 engine, commissioned by Adrian Newey, and designed, developed and produced by Cosworth for the Aston Martin Valkyrie sports car. The road-going engine is rated at 1,000 hp (746 kW; 1,014 PS) at 10,500 rpm, with a max torque figure of 740 N⋅m (546 lbf⋅ft) at 7,000 rpm, making it the most powerful naturally-aspirated engine ever fitted and used in a production road car. The engine also revs to a maximum of 11,100 rpm, and has a power density making 114.8 kW (156.1 PS; 153.9 hp) per litre.

== Background and development ==
Aston Martin and Red Bull Advanced Technologies teamed up to blueprint an all-new hypercar, and needed to rely on a technological partner able to challenge the norm, and redefine parameters while performing against an incredible brief. According to Cosworth, it is intended to be "evoking the spine-tingling, ultra-high-revving F1 engines of the 1990s, but benefitting from two decades of progress in design, material and manufacturing expertise." Red Bull’s Chief Technical Officer, Adrian Newey, specially delivered his brief to Cosworth, with the aim being to build the ultimate internal combustion engine. Cosworth's aim was to create the most powerful naturally-aspirated road engine ever, while meeting strict and often conflicting requirements in terms of durability, weight, emissions regulations.

Cosworth initially developed a 1.6-litre three-cylinder prototype (one-fourth of the Valkyrie's V12 engine) to make the combustion system hardware, which on its own was good for 250 hp (186 kW; 253 PS). The engine ran on Cosworth dynamometers within the first four months of beginning the project, so once the first V12 was tested after 14 months, it was already well along the development route. Every part of the engine was devised for minimum weight, with titanium connecting rods and F1-style pistons being used. The engine was also subjected to reliability and durability tests, comparable to those used on Cosworth's mass production units, typically 200 hours of hard running that equated to around 100,000 km (62,000 mi.) of road use. The product is an engine weighing only 206 kg (454 lb). For comparison, Cosworth’s last 3.0-litre V10 Formula One engine, the TJ2005, weighed 97 kg (214 lb) in 2005. If that V10 F1 race engine was scaled up to 6.5 litres, it would have weighed 210 kg (463 lb).

Over 1,300 individual parts were manufactured for the Valkyrie's engine, with a total of 5,000 components making up the total product. Cosworth constructs all major components for every engine at their headquarters, including cylinder heads, cylinder block, camshafts, crankshafts, and pistons. Each engine is manufactured by a team of skilled technicians before being contoured to one of our ten dynamometer cells to execute a break-in and pass-off test. The cylinder block uses Cosworth's plasma bore coating procedure, in which a layer of iron, marginally thicker than a human hair, is sprayed on the surface of the aluminium cylinder bore. This layer assists in reducing abrasion and improving the heat dissipation from the cylinder. The technology is in its early beginnings for road cars, but Cosworth has been using it for more than a decade on racing engines. Besides major castings, including the block, cylinder heads, oil sump and structural cam covers, most of the engine’s internal parts are constructed from solid material; including titanium conrods and F1-spec pistons. Not only does this authorise the utilisation of materials with ideal properties, but the intricate manufacturing procedure means better consistency and parts designed for minimal mass and maximal strength.

Cosworth's focus on continual optimisation is apparent with the billet-manufactured crankshaft. Beginning life as a solid steel bar; 170 mm (6.7 in.) diameter and 775 mm (30.5 in.) long, it is first roughed-out, finish-machined, heat-treated, gear-ground, plasma-nitrided, final-ground, and super-finished. From start to finish, 80% of the initial bar was machined away, leaving a crankshaft that’s half the weight of that utilised in the Aston Martin One-77’s engine.

With a KERS-style boost system akin to those fitted to F1 cars, the Aston Martin Valkyrie’s hybrid system has been developed by two main technical partners; Integral Powertrain Ltd, who supplied the bespoke electric motor, and Rimac for the lightweight hybrid battery system.

As a result, the full hybrid system contributes an additional 160 bhp of power and a further 280 N⋅m of available torque with the certified max power output of Aston Martin Valkyrie standing at 1,160 hp (865 kW; 1,176 PS) at 10,500 rpm. Equally, with the full hybrid system, peak torque will stand at 900 N⋅m (664 lb⋅ft) at 6,000 rpm.

== Variants ==
A more powerful, track-only, racing version of the RA engine was also produced for a racing-focused variant of the Valkyrie, called the Valkyrie AMR Pro. The AMR Pro uses the same 6.5-litre naturally-aspirated V12 engine as used in the Valkyrie road car, but this time without the KERS system. The engine is also modified to produce more power, which means the AMR Pro will have up to 1,100 (est. 1,160-1,300) horsepower; more than its standard road-legal counterpart.

A de-tuned version of the race-spec engine was later developed for the Valkyrie's Le Mans Hypercar counterpart, the Valkyrie AMR-LMH, made to run leaner and more reliably to meet the class performance window and last the length of an endurance race. This particular configuration of the engine is limited to 8,750 rpm and produces 697 hp (520 kW; 707 PS).

== Applications ==
- Aston Martin Valkyrie
- Aston Martin Valkyrie AMR-LMH

== See also ==
- Cosworth GMA
