= Wipac =

British auto engineering company

Wipac Technology Limited
- Industry: Automotive Accessories
- Founded: 1941
- Headquarters: Buckingham, UK
- Products: LED lighting, wipers, aerials
- Number of employees: 350
- Parent: Anrui Optoelectronics
- Divisions: Ultra Auto Design
- Website: http://www.wipac.com

Wipac is a British automotive engineering company based in Buckingham. The company resulted from a merger in 1941 of the British subsidiary of the American Witherbee Igniter Company (Wico) and British spark plug manufacturer Pacy to become the Wico-Pacy in Bletchley before eventually becoming the Wipac brand which became well known in the UK for car and motorbike accessories including driving lamps and windscreen wiper blades. Wipac moved to Buckingham in 1959 with 500 employees.

Wipac designed and manufactured the high intensity headlight mounted on the front of British Rail locomotives and multiple units from the mid 1980s. They subsequently designed the combined lighting cluster fitted to all British manufactured trains. The cluster consists of a high intensity headlamp, red tail light and smaller white 'marker' light. The Wipac cluster was fitted to virtually all British built multiple units, including classes 141, 142, 143, 144, 150, 151, 153, 155, 156, 158, 317, 319, 321, 322, 455 and 456. The single high intensity headlamp (known as a 'hair raiser') was fitted to all Southern Region slam-door units still in service post 1988, as well as DMMU trains of classes 101 to 128. Many Midland, Scottish and Eastern Region slam door units were also fitted in the 1990s.

In 1998 Wipac was acquired by Carclo and in recent years became specifically known for LED lights for vehicles including the high mounted stop lamp for the 1995 Cadillac Catera, one of the first multifunction LED tail lamps for the 2001 Porsche Carrera GT, and the front and rear lights for the 2011 Lamborghini Aventador.

The company manufacturers vehicle antennas, producing 1.4 million in 2005.

In 2007 Wipac acquired High Wycombe based Ultra Auto Design.

In December 2019 the automotive lighting business of Wipac was acquired by Anrui Optoelectronics Ltd of China, itself part of Sanan Optoelectronics. The optics, eyecare and ultra brands were retained within Carclo.
