= 2020 24 Hours of Le Mans =

88th 24 Hours of Le Mans endurance race

Previous: 2019	Next: 2021
Index: Races | Winners

Layout of the Circuit de la Sarthe

The 88th 24 Hours of Le Mans (French: 88^{e} 24 Heures du Mans) was a 24-hour automobile endurance race for Le Mans Prototype (LMP) and Le Mans Grand Touring Endurance (LMGTE) cars fielded by teams of three drivers each held from 19 to 20 September 2020 at the Circuit de la Sarthe, close to Le Mans, France. It was the 88th running of the event, as organised by the automotive group, the Automobile Club de l'Ouest (ACO) since 1923. The race, held behind closed doors, was the seventh in the 2019–20 FIA World Endurance Championship, having been postponed from June to September as a result of the COVID-19 pandemic in France.

A Toyota TS050 Hybrid shared by Mike Conway, Kamui Kobayashi and José María López started from pole position after Kobayashi set the overall fastest lap time in the Hyperpole session. The trio led most of the race's first half until Kobayashi was required to drive their car into the garage with mechanical issues dropping them to fourth in the LMP1 class. Their teammates Sébastien Buemi, Brendon Hartley and Kazuki Nakajima took over the lead, which they maintained until the finish. It was Buemi and Nakajima's third Le Mans victory, Hartley's second and Toyota's third in succession. A Rebellion R13 driven by Gustavo Menezes, Norman Nato and Bruno Senna was the highest-placed non-hybrid LMP1 car in second and Conway, Kobayashi and López finished third.

The United Autosports team of Filipe Albuquerque, Phil Hanson and Paul di Resta won the Le Mans Prototype 2 (LMP2) category with Jota Sport's António Félix da Costa, Anthony Davidson and Roberto González finishing almost 33 seconds later in second place. Panis Racing's Julien Canal, Nico Jamin, and Matthieu Vaxivière completed the category podium in third. Aston Martin won the Le Mans Grand Touring Endurance Professional (LMGTE Pro) category with an Aston Martin Racing-run Vantage GTE shared by Alex Lynn, Maxime Martin and Harry Tincknell finishing ahead of AF Corse's James Calado, Alessandro Pier Guidi and Daniel Serra. The British marque also won the Le Mans Grand Touring Endurance Amateur (LMGTE Am) class with the TF Sport team of Jonathan Adam, Charlie Eastwood and Salih Yoluç beating the Dempsey-Proton Racing squad of Matt Campbell, Riccardo Pera and Christian Ried by 49 seconds.

The result moved Buemi, Hartley and Nakajima to the lead of the LMP Drivers' Championship by seven points over Conway, Kobayashi and López whose third-place finish demoted them to second. Menezes, Nato and Senna remained in third position while Albuquerue and Hanson remained in fourth, having won the LMP2 Endurance Trophy for Drivers because of their class victory with their co-driver Di Resta fifth. In the GTE Drivers' Championship Lynn and Martin moved to within 15 points of their teammates Marco Sørensen and Nicki Thiim. Toyota and Aston Martin left Le Mans as the respective LMP1 Teams' and GTE Manufacturers' champions with one race left in the season.

== Background and event ==
After winning the preceding 6 Hours of Spa-Francorchamps, Toyota's Mike Conway, Kamui Kobayashi and José María López led the LMP Drivers' Championship with 137 points, with their teammates Sébastien Buemi, Brendon Hartley and Kazuki Nakajima in second. Rebellion's Gustavo Menezes, Norman Nato and Bruno Senna were third with 109 points, with Filipe Albuquerque and Phil Hanson of United Autosports fourth with 54 points and Paul di Resta in fifth with 46 points. In the GTE Drivers' Championship, Marco Sørensen and Nicki Thiim led for Aston Martin with 127 points over Michael Christensen and Kévin Estre of Porsche in second, and AF Corse's James Calado and Alessandro Pier Guidi in third. Toyota led the LMP1 Teams' Championship over Rebellion, while Aston Martin was ahead of Porsche in the GTE Manufacturers' Championship.

The 2020 race, the 88th edition of the event, was to be held at the Circuit de la Sarthe close to Le Mans, France, from 13 to 14 June; because of the COVID-19 pandemic leading France to impose a national lockdown to slow the spread of the virus, the ACO and the Fédération Internationale de l'Automobile (FIA) rescheduled it to 19 and 20 September. (Note: The 1968 race was postponed to September as a result of civil unrest in France.) The ACO wanted to establish new dates for the race as soon as French officials imposed the lockdown; they wanted to avoid the shorter daylight hours and poor weather late in the year, and had to take global travel limitations into account. It was also made the seventh and penultimate round of the 2019–20 FIA World Endurance Championship instead of ending the season as originally planned. Pierre Fillon, the ACO president, said that the race was not cancelled since many teams built their economic models around it.

Although there were plans to admit a limited number of ticket holders to Le Mans in ten social bubbles dubbed "fan villages" of 5,000 people each, it was held behind closed doors following discussions with the local Sarthe Prefecture because of an increase of COVID-19 cases in France in the preceding month. All teams were mandated to remain in bubbles and not communicate with other squads. Only 5,000 individuals could be admitted to the track, and all had to test negative for the virus and wear a face mask for safety reasons.

== Circuit changes ==
Modifications were made to the circuit at the exit of Mulsanne Corner. The gravel traps at the corner were extended. Updated safety fencing enabled the fence line to be moved back at different points in the turn. A larger, wider and thicker layer of asphalt was laid at both sides of the turn at the FIA's request to decrease the amount of disruption caused by a car going off. Work began in March 2020 and ended three months later in June.

== Entries ==
The ACO received 75 applications for the 18 December 2019 entry deadline. It granted 62 invitations to the 24 Hours of Le Mans. Entries were divided between the Le Mans Prototype 1 (LMP1), Le Mans Prototype 2 (LMP2), Le Mans Grand Touring Endurance Professional (LMGTE Pro) and Le Mans Grand Touring Endurance Amateur (LMGTE Am) categories.

=== Automatic entries ===
Teams that won their class in the 2019 24 Hours of Le Mans, or won championships in the European Le Mans Series (ELMS), Asian Le Mans Series (ALMS), and the Michelin Le Mans Cup (MLMC) earned an automatic entry invitation. The second-place finishers in the 2019 ELMS in LMP2 and LMGTE championships also earned automatic invitations. The ACO chose two participants from the IMSA SportsCar Championship (IMSA) to be automatic entries regardless of their performance or category. As invitations were granted to teams, they could change their cars from the previous year but not their category. The LMGTE class invitees from the ELMS and ALMS could choose between the Pro and Am categories. ELMS' LMP3 (Le Mans Prototype 3) champion is required to field an entry in LMP2, while the 2019–20 ALMS LMP3 champion was permitted to choose between LMP2 or LMGTE Am. The 2019 MLMC Group GT3 (GT3) champion was invited to the LMGTE Am category.

On 25 February 2020, the ACO announced the final list of automatic entries.

Automatic entries for the 2020 24 Hours of Le Mans
Reason invited	LMP1	LMP2	LMGTE Pro	LMGTE Am
1st in the 24 Hours of Le Mans	(Japan) Toyota Gazoo Racing	(France) Signatech Alpine Matmut	(Italy) AF Corse	(Germany) Team Project 1
1st in the European Le Mans Series (LMP2 and LMGTE)		(France) IDEC Sport	(United States) Luzich Racing	
2nd in the European Le Mans Series (LMP2 and LMGTE)		(Russia) G-Drive Racing	(Germany) Dempsey-Proton Racing	
1st in the European Le Mans Series (LMP3)		(United States) EuroInternational		
IMSA SportsCar Championship at-large entries		(Canada) Cameron Cassels		(United States) Richard Heistand
1st in the Asian Le Mans Series (LMP2 and GT)		(Russia) G-Drive Racing with Algarve	(Chinese Taipei) HubAuto Corsa	
1st in the Asian Le Mans Series (LMP2 Am)		(United States) Rick Ware Racing		
1st in the Asian Le Mans Series (LMP3)		(United Kingdom) Nielsen Racing	– or –	(United Kingdom) Nielsen Racing
1st in the Michelin Le Mans Cup (GT3)				(Switzerland) Kessel Racing

=== Entry list ===
The ACO announced the full 62 car entry list, plus ten reserves on 28 February. In addition to the 30 guaranteed WEC entries, 18 came from the ELMS, seven from IMSA, five from the ALMS and two one-off Le Mans entries. There were 30 cars in the two LMP classes, 31 in both LMGTE categories and one innovative entry. The Richard Mille Racing Team entered the first all-woman team in LMP2 at Le Mans, joined by a second all-female Iron Lynx squad in LMGTE Am, meaning that for the first time since 1977 there were two all-female line-ups in the race.

=== Garage 56 ===
The ACO intended to continue the Garage 56 concept, (Note: Garage 56's naming origins date back to its first entry the DeltaWing car occupying the 56th pit garage at the 2012 race.) started in 2012, which allows an additional entry to test new technologies at the race. Association SRT 41 founded by quadruple amputee racing driver Frédéric Sausset entered into an operational agreement with Graff Racing for one Oreca 07-Gibson car converted into an adapted automobile. The team intended to field three physically impaired drivers in the first all-disabled line-up in Le Mans history but withdrew from the event in April 2020 because of the effects of the COVID-19 pandemic, leaving it without adequate preparation. Sausset filed an entry request to the ACO for the 2021 24 Hours of Le Mans.

=== Reserves ===
In addition to the 62 entries given invitations for the race, 10 were put on a reserve list to replace any withdrawn or unconfirmed invitations. The first reserve entry replaced the first withdrawal from the race, regardless of the class and entry, and so on. Due to the COVID-19 pandemic's economic impact, Porsche withdrew both of their CORE Autosport-ran 911-RSR 19s in May, reducing their representation in LMGTE Pro from four to two entries. That same month, Corvette Racing withdrew their two C8.Rs, meaning the team would be absent from Le Mans for the first time since 2000. On 18 June, the ACO released a revised entry list confirming the withdrawal of the Porsche and Corvette entries. The Spirit of Race Ferrari 488 GTE Evo, the ByKolles CLM P1/01-Gibson, the IDEC Sport and High Class Racing Orecas and the Proton Competition Porsche 911 RSR were promoted to the race entry.

Team LNT withdrew one of its Ginetta G60-LT-P1 cars, reducing the LMP1 class to six entries. Performance Tech Motorsports pulled its Oreca 07 from the entry list. Rick Ware Racing withdrew its Riley Mk. 30 car, and GEAR Racing withdrew its LMGTE Pro-class Ferrari 488 GTE Evo. High Class Racing reduced its involvement to a single LMP2 vehicle. The DragonSpeed, Iron Lynx and Team Project 1 teams each had one car added to the entry list while the D'Station Racing Aston Martin Vantage GTE and the Inter Europol Competition Ligier JS P217 cars were deleted from the reserve list. In August, WeatherTech Racing moved its Ferrari 488 GTE Evo from the LMGTE Am to the LMGTE Pro category following a driver lineup change. Carlin's Dallara P217 and Kessel Racing's LMGTE Am Ferrari withdrew later that month as Iron Lynx added a third Ferrari to the LMGTE Am class. On 11 September, the remaining Team LNT Ginetta G60-LT-P1 entry withdrew because of uncertainties related to UK COVID-19 quarantine measures, and its effect on Ginetta's business model. This reduced the entry list to 59 cars.

== Testing ==
For the first time since the 2010 race, the ACO did not hold an official test day for teams to test car aerodynamic updates at Le Mans. The ACO cancelled it because of the compression of international motor racing calendar schedules, and did not want to strain participants by holding too many events, like the test day, close to each other. Thus, drivers who had not entered the event within the preceding five years were required to drive at least ten laps during the first two practice sessions and attend a simulator test.

== Pre-race balance of performance changes ==
The FIA Endurance Committee imposed an equivalence of technology in LMP1 and LMP2 and a balance of performance in an attempt to create parity between LMGTE Pro and LMGTE Am. A total of 7 kg (15 lb) of ballast was added to the Toyota TS050 Hybrid compared to 2019 to reduce its handling, while non-hybrid and turbocharged LMP1 privateers had no change in weight. Privateers were allowed to use 11 laps worth of fuel per stint to fall in line with Toyota and larger refuelling restrictor diameters for quicker refuelling by one second. In LMGTE Pro, the Aston Martin Vantage GTE received an increased turbocharger boost from 2019 and 1 L (0.22 imp gal; 0.26 US gal) more fuel capacity for better performance. The Porsche 911 RSR-19 was given a 20 kg (44 lb) increase in ballast and a 0.3 mm (0.012 in) larger air restrictor from its predecessor. The LMGTE Am Aston Martin, Ferrari and Porsches had an increase of 10 kg (22 lb) in weight for tighter handling.

== Practice ==
The first three-hour practice session occurred on the morning of 17 September. Nakajima set the fastest lap of 3:21.656 in the No. 8 Toyota, ahead of the second-placed No. 7 of Kobayashi. The highest-placed privateer was Menezes' No. 1 Rebellion R13 car in third with teammate Louis Delétraz's No. 3 car fourth. Orecas took the first five places in LMP2 with the quickest lap being a 3:29.873 set by High Class Racing's Kenta Yamashita, 0.045 seconds faster than Racing Team Nederland's Giedo van der Garde with Jota Sport's António Félix da Costa third. Aston Martin led both the LMGTE categories with Alex Lynn and Thiim in the No. 97 and No. 95 entries heading the Pro class with Ross Gunn the fastest Amateur class driver in the No. 98 car. Steve Brooks in the No. 89 Project 1 Porsche caused a stoppage with 70 minutes left after beaching in the gravel trap at the entry to Indianapolis corner and required extraction to enable his return to the pit lane.

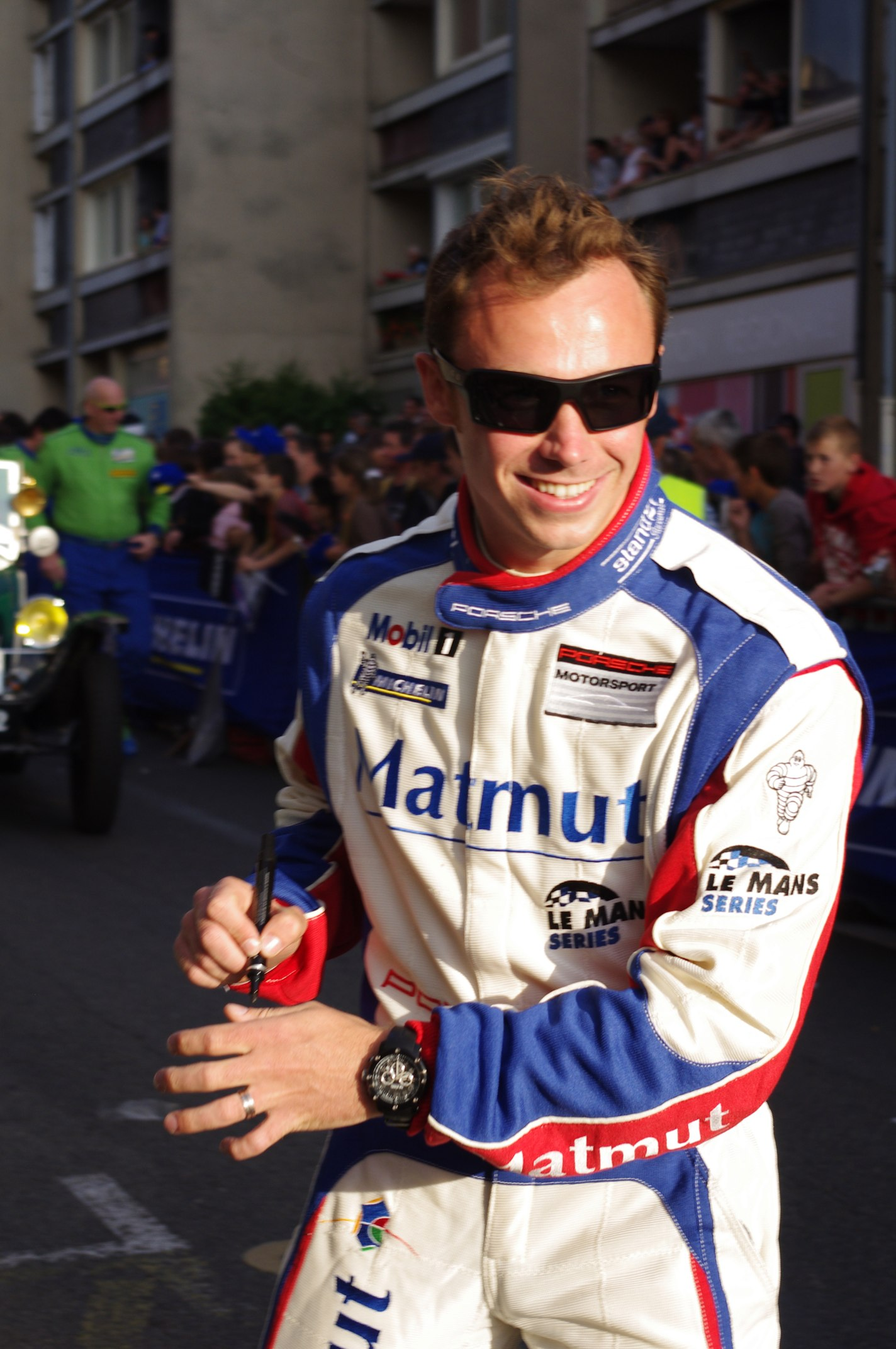
Patrick Pilet (pictured) replaced Dwight Merriman after he was injured in an accident during practice

The second three-hour practice session was held later in the day. The No. 8 Toyota once again led the session as Buemi set a 3:19.719 lap just before the start of the second hour. Conway's sister No. 7 Toyota was almost nine-tenths of a second slower in second. The Rebellions were third and fourth after laps from Menezes and Romain Dumas. Racing Team Nederland's Nyck de Vries set the fastest LMP2 lap of 3:27.185 in the final hour. The No. 37 Jackie Chan DC Racing Oreca car of Will Stevens was second-fastest with Félix da Costa third. Aston Martin was overtaken at the top of LMGTE Pro by Christensen's No. 92 Porsche in the last 20 minutes as Lynn's No. 97 Aston Martin took second. Matt Campbell's No. 77 Dempsey-Proton Racing Porsche topped LMGTE Am in the final ten minutes, ahead of Côme Ledogar in Luzich Racing's No. 61 Ferrari. The session saw two stoppages for crashes. Paul Lafargue crashed his IDEC Sport car exiting the second Mulsanne Straight chicane before the first hour's end. Lafargue's teammate Dwight Merriman in the No. 17 car had a heavy accident exiting the Porsche Curves an hour later. Merriman sustained a back injury, and the FIA Medical Delegate deemed him unfit to drive, leading to Porsche's Patrick Pilet replacing him. IDEC rebuilt the car around a new monocoque.

The third session lasted for four hours and occurred at night, providing drivers their first opportunity to acclimatise to the dark before the race. Deletraz's No. 3 Rebellion led from the first hour to the end with a 3:19.158 lap. Kobayashi's No. 7 Toyota followed in second with Menezes' No. 1 Rebellion third. The No. 8 Toyota was fourth after a lap from Buemi. After 90 minutes, Bruno Spengler caused a stoppage when he ran wide exiting Tetre Rouge corner and crashed the ByKolles car. Spengler drove it to the pit lane for repairs. Tristan Gommendy's No. 30 Duqueine Engineering car led in LMP2 with a lap of 3:28.013. Job van Uitert was second in United Autosport's No. 32 car and Jean-Éric Vergne's No. 26 G-Drive Racing entry was third. LMGTE Pro was led by Estre's No. 92 Porsche from Aston Martin's No. 97 and No. 95 entries of Maxime Martin and Sørensen. Kei Cozzolino put the MR Racing Ferrari top in LMGTE Am with Augusto Farfus's No. 98 Aston Martin and Paolo Ruberti's No. 60 Iron Lynx Ferrari second and third. The session ended early when Bonamy Grimes lost control of the No. 62 Red River Sport Ferrari under braking for the first Mulsanne Straight chicane and struck the outside barrier. Grimes was unhurt.

The fourth and final practice lasted an hour on the morning of 18 September. Menezes set a lap of 3:21.132 just before the final 15 minutes to lead the field in the No. 1 Rebellion ahead of Conway's second-place No. 7 Toyota and Deletraz's No. 3 Rebellion in third. The slower Toyota was Hartley's No. 8 car in fourth. The quickest LMP2 car was Di Resta's No. 23 United Autosports entry with a 3:27.185 lap time. Vergne in G-Drive's No. 26 car was second with Félix da Costa's No. 38 Jota entry in third. Porsche led in LMGTE Pro with Christensen's No. 92 car fastest over the AF Corse duo of Sam Bird and his teammate Pier Guidi. Team Project 1's Matteo Cairoli was fastest in LMGTE Am. Red River Sport sat out the session as its Ferrari was being repaired following Grimes' accident while both IDEC Sport cars were driven for the first time since their accidents the day before.

== Qualifying ==
A new qualifying format for the Le Mans event was introduced, consisting of only two single qualifying sessions (instead of the three qualifying sessions in the previous editions). The 45-minute Thursday late afternoon qualifying session determined the field, except for the top six cars in each category. The top six cars in each class took part in a half-hour shootout on Friday morning, known as "Le Mans Hyperpole". The shootout determined the pole position in each category. Cars were placed on the starting grid in order by category, with all LMP1s at the front of the field regardless of lap time, followed by LMP2, LMGTE Pro, and LMGTE Am. The cars were placed in following order: the six qualifying Hyperpole vehicles by best Hyperpole session lap time, followed by the rest of the cars in the class that did not qualify for Hyperpole by best lap time set during the first qualifying session.

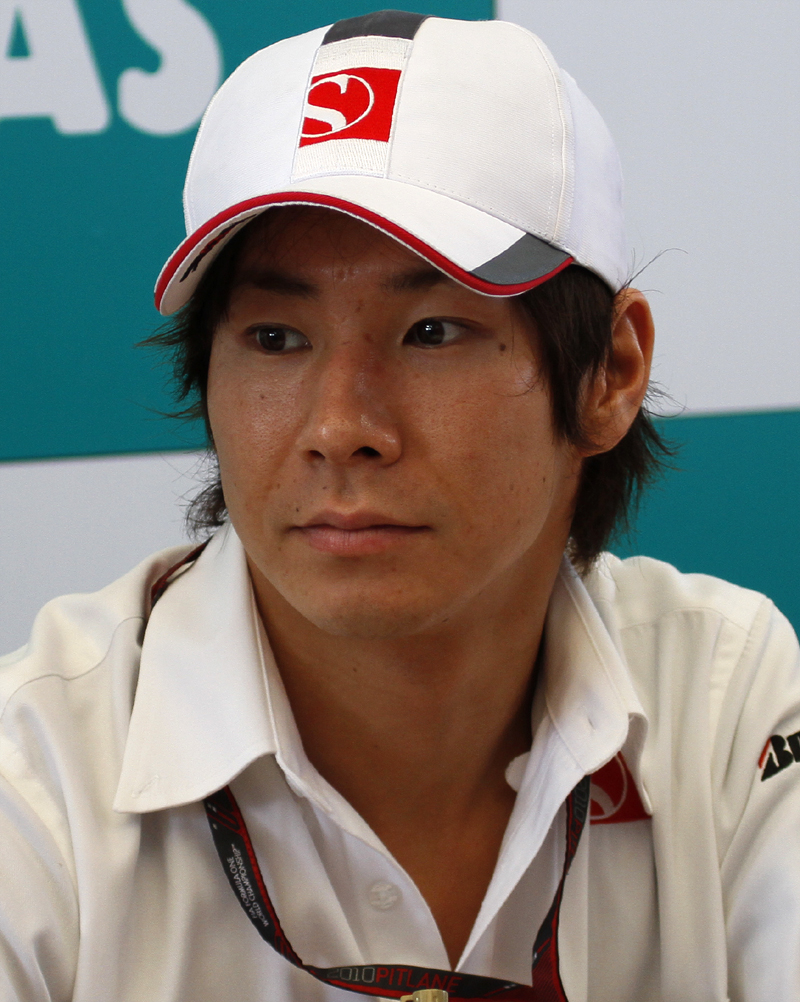
Kamui Kobayashi set the fastest lap of the Hyperpole session to take pole position in the No. 7 Toyota TS050 Hybrid.

All five entries in the LMP1 class progressed to the Hyperpole portion of qualifying with the fastest lap being a 3:17.089 time by Kobayashi in the No. 7 Toyota early in the session. The No. 95 and No. 97 Aston Martin Racing Vantage's of Sørensen and Lynn, along with car No. 51 and No. 71 AF Corse Ferrari's of Davide Rigon and Pier Guidi and the Porsche 911 RSR-19 cars 91 and 92 of Bruni and Christensen progressed to Hyperpole in LMGTE Pro. LMGTE Am saw Gunn's No. 98 Aston Martin Vantage and the 90 TF Sport Vantage of Charlie Eastwood along with Gulf Racing's Ben Barker, the No. 61 Luzich Racing Ferrari of Ledogar, Dempsey-Proton Porsche with car 77 driven by Campbell and the Team Project 1 Porsche with car No. 56 used by Cairoli going through to Hyperpole. In LMP2, the Racing Team Nederland entry of De Vries along with entries from Stevens of the Jackie Chan team, the No. 22 and 32 United Autosports vehicle of Di Resta and Alex Brundle, Vergne's G-Drive No. 26 car and Yamashita's High Class Racing No. 39 car all qualified for the Hyperpole session.

Traffic was less of an issue with fewer cars in Hyperpole, allowing for faster lap times. Kobayashi set the fastest lap of 3:15.267 for pole position in the No. 7 Toyota on his second lap on a new set of tyres. He was set to break his qualifying lap record from 2017 but transgressed track limits at the Tertre Rouge corner and had to slow down and returned to the pit lane. Nakajima qualified the No. 8 Toyota in second, Menezes' No. 1 Rebellion took third in the quickest non-hybrid car, Deletraz's No. 3 Rebellion was fourth and the Tom Dillmann put the ByKolles team fifth. Kobayashi achieved Toyota's fourth pole position in a row at Le Mans. LMP2 pole position was secured Di Resta's No. 22 United Autosport entry on a new class lap record of 3:24.528. Following in second through sixth were the No. 26 G-Drive (Vergne), the Racing Team Nederland (De Vries), High Class (Yamashita), the No. 32 United Autosport (Brundle) and No. 37 Jackie Chan (Stevens) entries. Each of the three GTE manufacturers occupied the first three positions in LMGTE Pro. Bruni took the category pole position driving the No. 91 Porsche from Calado's AF Corse No. 51 Ferrari and Sørensen's No. 95 Aston Martin. In LMGTE Am Ledogar's No. 61 Luzich Ferrari reset the category lap record to 3:51.266 to claim pole position, demoting Campbell in the No. 77 Proton Porsche to second. Third was Cairoli driving the No. 56 Project 1 Porsche.

After qualifying, the FIA revised the balance of performance, increasing the fuel capacity of the LMGTE Pro-category Porsche 911 RSR-19 by 1 L (0.22 imp gal; 0.26 US gal) and clarifying that LMGTE Pro cars found to be in non-compliance of refuelling procedures would incur penalties on an incremental scale from a stop-and-go penalty to a two-minute hold.

=== Qualifying results ===
Pole positions in each class are denoted in bold.

Final qualifying classification
Pos.	Class	No.	Team	Qualifying	Hyperpole	Grid
**1**	**LMP1**	**7**	**Toyota Gazoo Racing**	**3:17.089**	**3:15.267**	1
2	LMP1	1	Rebellion Racing	3:21.598	3:15.822	2
3	LMP1	8	Toyota Gazoo Racing	3:17.336	3:16.649	3
4	LMP1	3	Rebellion Racing	3:24.632	3:18.330	4
5	LMP1	4	ByKolles Racing Team	3:24.468	3:23.043	5
**6**	**LMP2**	**22**	**United Autosports**	3:27.148	**3:24.528**	6
7	LMP2	26	G-Drive Racing	3:27.366	3:24.860	7
8	LMP2	29	Racing Team Nederland	3:26.648	3:25.062	8
9	LMP2	33	High Class Racing	3:27.611	3:25.426	9
10	LMP2	32	United Autosports	3:27.598	3:25.671	10
11	LMP2	37	Jackie Chan DC Racing	3:27.097	3:25.785	11
12	LMP2	38	Jota	3:27.728		12
13	LMP2	16	G-Drive Racing by Algarve	3:27.767		13
14	LMP2	31	Panis Racing	3:27.791		14
15	LMP2	36	Signatech Alpine Elf	3:27.794		15
16	LMP2	27	DragonSpeed USA	3:27.913		16
17	LMP2	42	Cool Racing	3:28.509		17
18	LMP2	39	SO24-HAS by Graff	3:28.574		18
19	LMP2	30	Duqueine Team	3:29.091		19
20	LMP2	25	Algarve Pro Racing	3:29.402		20
21	LMP2	21	DragonSpeed USA	3:29.741		21
22	LMP2	47	Cetilar Racing	3:29.880		22
23	LMP2	35	Eurasia Motorsport	3:30.497		23
24	LMP2	24	Nielsen Racing	3:30.897		24
25	LMP2	50	Richard Mille Racing Team	3:31.020		25
26	LMP2	34	Inter Europol Competition	3:31.393		26
27	LMP2	11	EuroInternational	3:33.747		27
**28**	**LMGTE Pro**	**91**	**Porsche GT Team**	3:52.036	**3:50.874**	28
29	LMGTE Pro	51	AF Corse	3:51.244	3:51.115	29
30	LMGTE Pro	95	Aston Martin Racing	3:50.872	3:51.241	30
31	LMGTE Pro	97	Aston Martin Racing	3:50.925	3:51.324	31
32	LMGTE Pro	71	AF Corse	3:51.988	3:51.515	32
33	LMGTE Pro	92	Porsche GT Team	3:52.142	3:51.770	33
34	LMGTE Pro	63	WeatherTech Racing	3:52.508		34
**35**	**LMGTE Am**	**61**	**Luzich Racing**	3:53.292	**3:51.266**	36
36	LMGTE Am	77	Dempsey-Proton Racing	3:53.334	3:51.322	37
37	LMGTE Am	56	Team Project 1	3:53.598	3:51.647	38
38	LMGTE Am	98	Aston Martin Racing	3:52.778	3:52.105	39
39	LMGTE Am	90	TF Sport	3:52.961	3:52.299	40
40	LMGTE Am	86	Gulf Racing	3:52.970	3:52.346	41
41	LMGTE Am	83	AF Corse	3:53.621		42
42	LMGTE Am	99	Dempsey-Proton Racing	3:53.670		43
43	LMGTE Am	57	Team Project 1	3:53.838		44
44	LMGTE Am	54	AF Corse	3:54.144		45
45	LMGTE Am	88	Dempsey-Proton Racing	3:54.281		46
46	LMGTE Am	70	MR Racing	3:54.628		47
47	LMGTE Am	72	Hub Auto Racing	3:55.308		48
48	LMGTE Am	55	Spirit of Race	3:55.772		49
49	LMGTE Am	75	Iron Lynx	3:56.141		50
50	LMGTE Am	66	JMW Motorsport	3:56.383		51
51	LMGTE Am	78	Proton Competition	3:56.475		52
52	LMGTE Am	85	Iron Lynx	3:56.833		53
53	LMGTE Am	60	Iron Lynx	3:57.876		54
54	LMGTE Am	62	Red River Sport	4:00.084		55
55	LMGTE Am	89	Team Project 1	4:00.691		56
—	LMGTE Pro	82	Risi Competizione	No Time (Note: The No. 82 Risi Ferrari and No. 52 AF Corse Ferrari had all their qualifying lap times deleted after both teams broke parc fermé regulations by lifting the car.)		35
—	LMGTE Am	52	AF Corse	No Time		57
—	LMP2	17	IDEC Sport	No Time		PL (Note: The No. 17 and No. 28 IDEC Oreca-Gibson were required to start from pit lane after the conclusion of the first racing lap for failing to participate in qualifying.)
—	LMP2	28	IDEC Sport	No Time		PL

== Warm-up ==
A 15-minute warm-up session was held on the morning of 19 September. Early morning rainfall meant most teams were reluctant to send their cars onto the resultant tricky circuit. Buemi's No. 8 Toyota recorded the fastest lap at 3:36.693 with his teammate Conway in the No. 7 car second. Both the Rebellion and the only ByKolles non-hybrid cars set no lap times during the session. Van der Garde led LMP2 in the Racing Team Nederland car at 3:43.022. Matthieu Vaxivière was six seconds slower in the second-place Panis Racing car. Calado's No. 51 AF Corse Ferrari was fastest in LMGTE Pro with Giancarlo Fisichella's No. 54 AF Corse car quickest in LMGTE Am and third amongst all LMGTE entries. No major incidents occurred during the session.

== Race ==
=== Start and opening hours ===
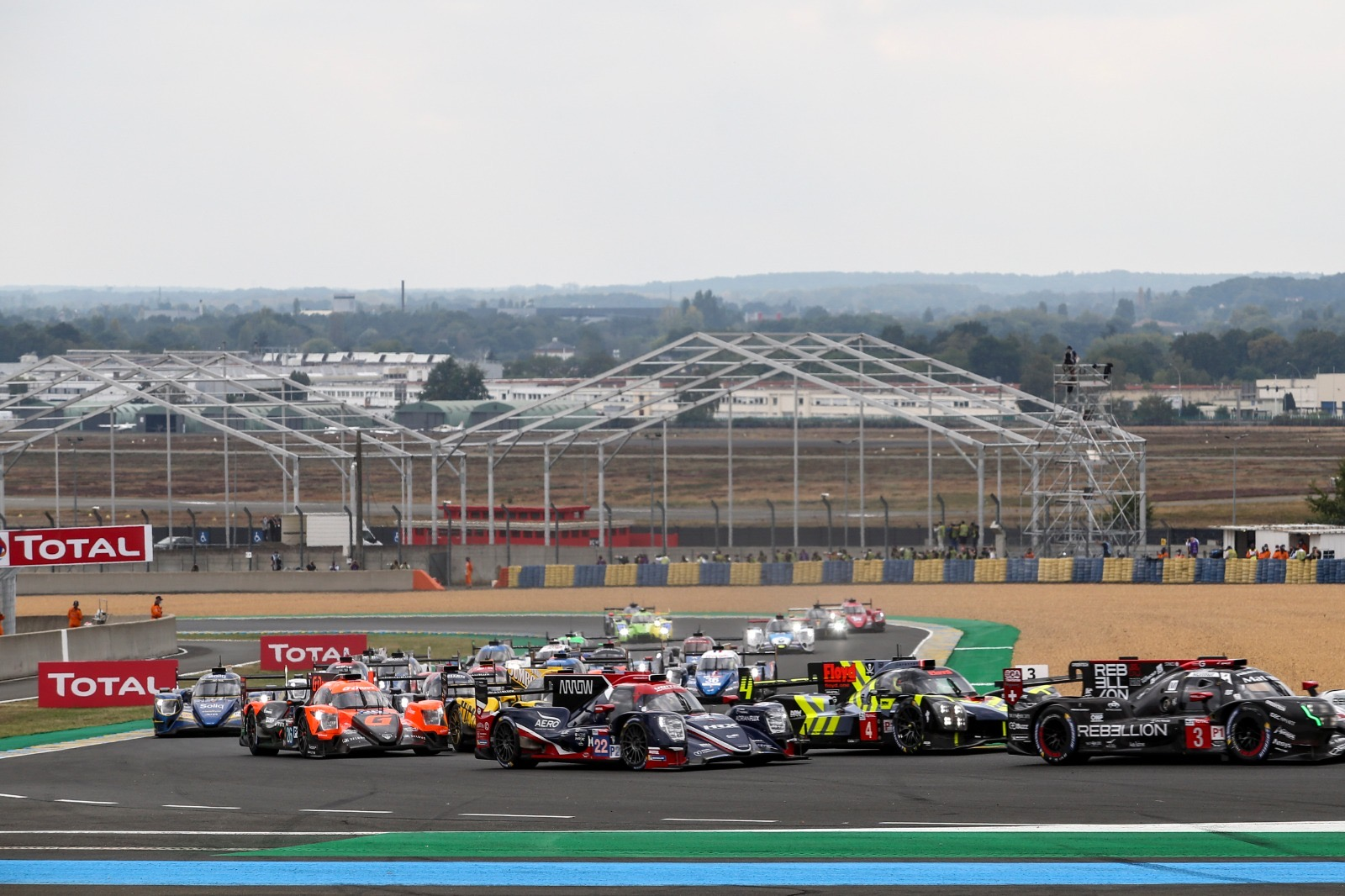
The start of the race as viewed at the Dunlop Chicane

At the start, the track was wet with the air temperature from 16.5 to 24.7 °C (61.7 to 76.5 °F) and the track temperature between 19 and 40 °C (66 and 104 °F). The French tricolour was waved at 14:30 Central European Summer Time (UTC+02:00) by Carlos Tavares, the chair of Groupe PSA's managing board, to start the race, led by the starting pole sitter Conway. Because the event was held in September, track temperatures were cooler and there would be more darkness hours, influencing changes in vehicle behaviour and requiring drivers and teams to adapt to the new conditions. At the start, Senna overtook Buemi and briefly passed Conway through turn one. Conway retained the lead by braking later into Dunlop turn. Senna refocused on holding second place from Buemi as Bruni fell to fourth in LMGTE Pro when Calado, and Aston Martin's Lynn and Thiim overtook him. Buemi passed Senna on lap nine because of a shorter first pit stop as a result of Toyota overfilling their cars with fuel. He relinquished second to Senna when he was required to make an extra pit stop to replace a left-rear puncture five laps later, putting Conway 40 seconds ahead of Buemi and promoting Berthon to third.

After 20 minutes, Oswaldo Negri Jr. lost control of the No. 61 Luzich car under braking in the entry to Dunlop corner, causing Thomas Preining driving the No. 88 Dempsey-Proton Porsche to swerve to avoid the spinning Ferrari, drive onto the grass and backed into the outside tyre barrier. The damage to the Dempsey-Proton Porsche necessitated its removal from the side of the track to behind the barrier before Preining was able to drive it to the pit lane. At the conclusion of the opening hour, both Toyotas were faster than the Rebellion cars per lap, although Senna had set the overall fastest lap on lap four. The LMGTE Pro lead became a multi-car battle between representatives of Aston Martin and Ferrari, with the lead changing several times over the following hours. Berthon brought the No. 3 Rebellion car into the pit lane for an engine bodywork switch, as the divergence between both Toyotas created by the No. 8 car's earlier puncture allowed both to race each other for the overall lead in the second hour when Conway was overtaken by teammate Buemi into the opening section of the Porsche Curves. Conway retook the lead when Buemi made a scheduled pit stop.

James Allen's No. 39 Graff car took the lead in LMP2 during the second hour. The team held it until Allen's co-driver Vincent Capillaire lost control of the vehicle in the Porsche Curves and went into the gravel trap three hours and 30 minutes in, falling to eighth in class and forcing Capillaire to make an additional pit stop. Stevens moved through the LMP2 field to take the lead in the No. 37 Jackie Chan car following Capillaire's pit stop. Pit stops for Ho-Pin Tung's No. 37 Jackie Chan entry and Roman Rusinov's No. 26 G-Drive car elevated the No. 32 United Autosports car of Job van Uitert to the lead in LMP2. The lead of LMGTE Am became a battle between representatives of the Team Project 1, TF Sport, AF Corse and Aston Martin Racing with first place being exchanged multiple times with Emmanuel Collard's No. 83 Ferrari moving to the top of the category at the conclusion of the fourth hour by making a pit stop during a slow zone procedure for debris clearing. (Note: The slow zone is an area of track where cars are required to slow to 80 km/h (50 mph) and not overtake to allow marshals to clear the circuit following an incident.) The No. 56 Project 1 Porsche fell to seventh in LMGTE Am early in the fifth hour when the team incurred a one-minute stop-and-go penalty for speeding in a slow zone.

=== Sunset to night ===
As dusk fell, Alexander West lost control of the No. 52 AF Corse Ferrari driving through the Porsche Curves and crashed into the outside barrier with the left-hand side of the vehicle and ended up facing in the opposite direction. The accident led to the event's first safety car intervention so that the barriers at the Porsche Curves could be repaired. During the safety car period, Toyota brought Kobayashi's No. 7 entry into the pit lane for fuel, promoting Nakajima's No. 8 car to the lead. As the safety cars were recalled, (Note: At the 24 Hours of Le Mans, three safety cars are deployed following an incident.) the first two in LMP1 and LMP2, the top three in LMGTE Pro and the top two in LMGTE Am were closed up by a few seconds and separated from the rest of their respective fields. Gabriel Aubry's No. 37 Jackie Chan Oreca led in LMP2, but around half past eight, the squad relinquished the lead it had held for 27 consecutive laps to Vergne's No. 26 G-Drive team when he stopped in the Porsche Curves because of a failed alternator. Officials disqualified the car when they determined Aubry received outside assistance for repairs when a team member supplied him with a car component on the circuit to enable it to be restarted for its return to the pit lane.

Not long after, the rear wing on Spengler's ByKolles car failed going down the hill into the Forest Esses, sending him into the gravel trap at the Dunlop Curves striking the tyre wall. Spengler was unhurt and was able to drive the car to the pit lane and into retirement for the sixth year in succession as a decision made by ByKolles as a precaution. Almost at the same time, Gommendy's No. 30 Duqueine vehicle and Albuquerque's No. 22 United Autosports car collided into the first Mulsanne Straight chicane. This caused Gommendy to lose control of his car and hit the guardrail barrier hard enough to damage it; he was unhurt and entered the medical car unassisted. Safety cars were required once again as the barriers needed lengthy repairs, while a slow zone was used after 30 minutes. During the second safety car intervention, the No. 8 Toyota was brought into the garage to replace its right-front brakes and allow the team to repair a right-front brake duct cooling problem caused by rubber build-up in the cooling shroud. Repairs took over 10 minutes to complete, and the No. 8 Toyota briefly lost second to Nato's No. 1 Rebellion car and dropped one lap behind López's No. 7 vehicle.

The track was declared wet in the eighth hour after drivers reported light, localised rainfall at the Porsche Curves. Andrea Piccini relinquished the No. 75 Iron Lynx car's hold of the lead of LMGTE Am to Nicklas Nielsen's No. 83 AF Corse car when it had a power steering problem that required the opening of its front storage compartment in the garage. Vergne was required to serve a drive-through penalty the No. 26 G-Drive team incurred when he passed behind the safety car. This promoted Brundle's No. 32 United Autosports entry to the lead of LMP2. After 7 1/2 hours, a third safety car period was needed for six minutes to allow for the moving of safety vehicles used to repair the guardrail barrier following Gommendy's crash at the first Mulsanne Straight chicane. When racing resumed, the focus was on the battle for the lead in both of the GTE classes between Aston Martin and Ferrari. Rusinov's No. 26 G-Drive Oreca bowed out of the lead battle in LMP2 when he entered the pit lane with starter motor problems in the 10th hour after having to restart the car several times on the circuit.

Bird ceded the No. 71 AF Corse Ferrari's hold on third place in LMGTE Pro to Westbrook's No. 95 Aston Martin in the 11th hour when he picked up a right-rear puncture on the Mulsanne Straight and slowly got the car to the garage for an inspection and brake repairs. At mid-point, Kobayashi's No. 7 Toyota led Hartley's sister No. 8 car by a lap with the two Rebellion entries of Menezes and Dumas third and fourth. United Autosports held first and second in LMP2 with the No. 32 of Will Owen ahead of his teammate Di Resta and the No. 38 Jota car of Roberto González third. Soon after, Kobayashi began slowing due to a loss of power caused by a fracture in the right-hand side exhaust manifold traced to a build quality problem. He relinquished the race lead to teammate Hartley when he entered the garage to allow mechanics to install a new right-hand side turbocharger and exhaust assembly. Repairs lasted 29 minutes and 47 seconds and the No. 7 Toyota returned in fourth position, seven laps behind Hartley. Rebellion's Menezes and Dumas were promoted to second and third.

=== Early morning to afternoon ===
Félix da Costa's seat belts were accidentally undone while adjusting them for tightness through Tertre Rouge in a slow zone, requiring him to make an extra pit stop in Jota's No. 38 car and dropping him further behind United Autosports. In the early morning Brundle drove the No. 32 United Autosports car into the garage for 45 minutes with a broken solid engine oil line causing an oil leak, handing the lead of LMP2 to Di Resta's sister No. 22 vehicle. Not long after, Paul Dalla Lana's Aston Martin's No. 98 car was forced to leave the battle for the LMGTE Am victory when its rear suspension failed into Indianapolis turn. This required attention in the garage and dropped the entry down the class order. By the 17th hour, Julien Canal's Panis car was third in LMP2 with Jensen's No. 26 G-Drive entry close behind in fourth as Aston Martin and Ferrari continued to contest the victory in LMGTE Pro. An alternative tyre strategy to refuelling saw exchanges of the class lead between the No. 51 AF Corse and the No. 95 Aston Martin teams. Senna had an anxious moment in the 19th hour when he reported a vibration on the No. 1 Rebellion because its front nose had become dislodged from striking a rabbit. This required a five-minute stay in the garage for new front bodywork prolonged by a twisted mounting point. Menezes took over from Senna and fell to third behind teammate Dumas.

The Rebellion team asked their drivers to pressure Hartley in the No. 8 Toyota to the conclusion of the race. Rebellion frequently imposed team orders on Menezes to stop him battling his teammate Dumas, preventing the No. 1 car from overheating and sustaining engine damage. Menezes noted it would be difficult to remain within two seconds of Dumas while Kobayashi's No. 7 Toyota was close by. Kobayashi unlapped himself from the Rebellion cars and took pressure off Menezes. Rebellion's strategy to put their cars on different pit stop cycles proved ineffective as Menezes continued to duel Dumas. With 2 hours, 20 minutes remaining, Deletraz relieved Dumas in the No. 3 car but had trouble starting it because of a worn clutch. He lost 20 seconds and third place to the sister No. 1 entry. Deletraz missed the braking point for Indianapolis turn and damaged the No. 3 Rebellion against the tyre barrier. After a pit stop to replace the front and rear bodywork saw Deletraz again fail to start, the No. 3 team lost third to the No. 7 Toyota.

With less than 45 minutes remaining, Vergne's No. 26 G-Drive car had a high-speed front-right suspension failure into Indianapolis corner. Vergne stopped before the wall and returned to the garage, losing third in LMP2 to the Panis team. Allen, driving the No. 39 Graff car, struck the tyre barrier on the entry to the Porsche Curves in the final hour and the wall needed repairing. This led to the race's fourth and final safety car intervention. Racing resumed following the completion of repairs to the barrier with 23 minutes remaining. Hanson, driving the No. 22 United Autosports car, made a swift pit stop for fuel in the final ten minutes, returning to the circuit six seconds ahead of Jota's No. 38 car. It made a final pit stop four minutes after Hanson, since the driver, Davidson, could not save enough fuel behind the safety car.

=== Finish ===
Nakajima crossed the finish line first after 387 laps to win for the No. 8 Toyota team, five laps ahead of the second-placed No. 1 Rebellion car. The No. 7 Toyota finished in third position and the No. 3 Rebellion car completed the LMP1 order in fourth. It was Buemi and Nakajima's third Le Mans victory, Hartley's second and Toyota's third in succession. Toyota also won the LMP1 Teams' Championship since Rebellion were unable to overtake its points total with one race left. The No. 22 United Autosports car led the final 136 laps and 279 out of 370 in class to win in LMP2 at Le Mans for the first time. Drivers Albuquerque, Di Resta and Hanson secured their first Le Mans victories. United Autosports, as well as Albuquerque and Hanson, secured the LMP2 teams' and driver's endurance trophies with one round to go. Jota Sport followed 32.831 seconds later in second, and Panis Racing completed the class podium in third. Aston Martin took its first LMGTE Pro victory since 2017 with the No. 97 car finishing 1 minute and 33 seconds ahead of the No. 51 AF Corse Ferrari to win the GTE Manufacturers' Championship. The marque also won in LMGTE Am with the No. 90 TF Sport entry earning the team's first category win, with the No. 77 Dempsey-Proton Porsche 49 seconds behind in second.

== Post-race ==
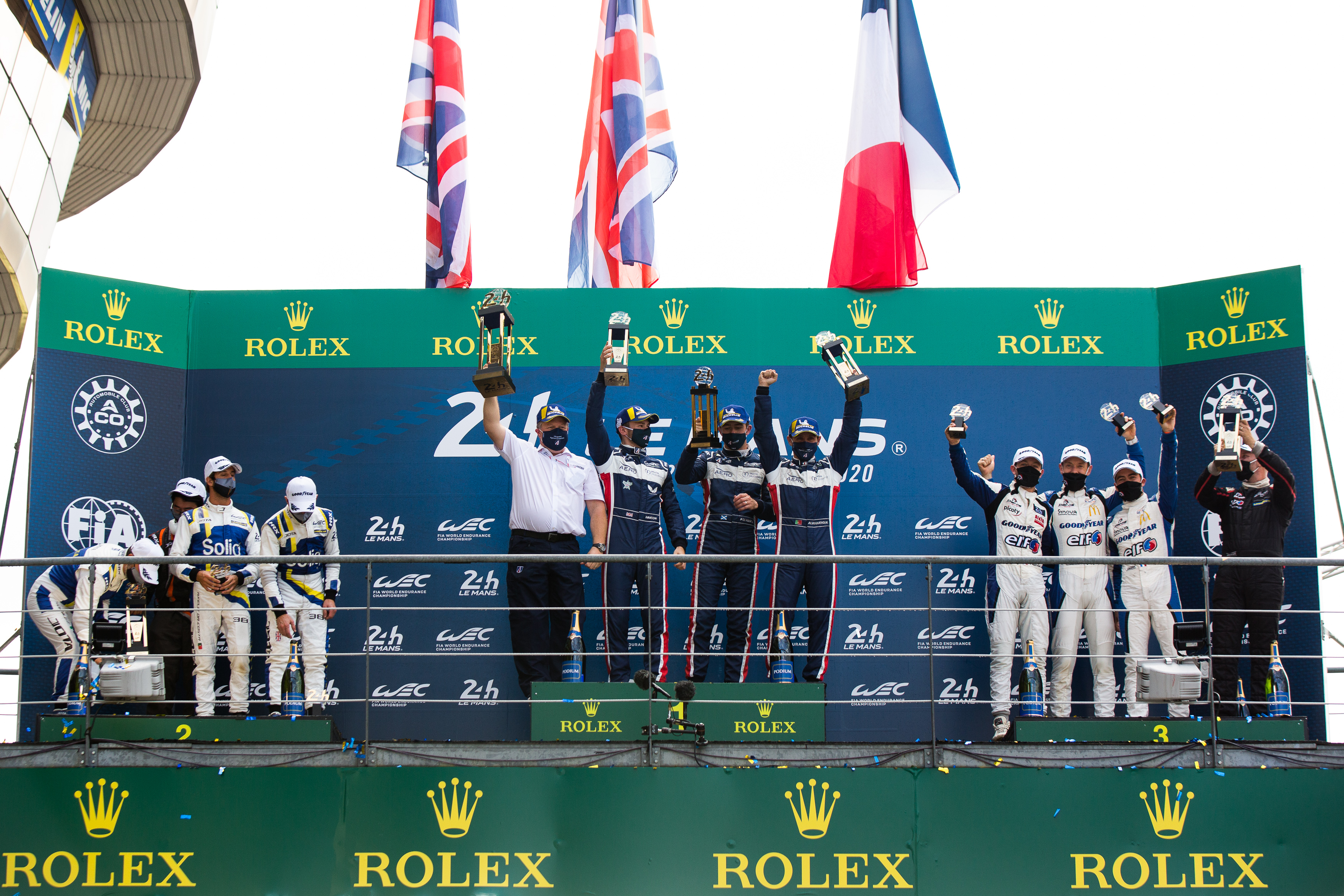
The LMP2 post-race podium ceremony

The top three teams in each of the four classes appeared on the podium to collect their trophies and spoke to the media in separate press conferences. Buemi commented it was Toyota's primary objective to win its third Le Mans race. Nakajima said he was satisfied that at least one member of his team had won the race, while Hartley added that winning with two different manufacturers surprised him. Senna said that Rebellion's second-place finish was an "amazing achievement", and Menezes called sharing second overall "something special". Conway admitted he was upset to lose the opportunity for victory, saying: "This place hasn't been the kindest to us at times. Three wins on the trot for the team, we've got to be happy about that for the team, but on our side of the garage we just feel like another one got away from us." Pascal Vasselon, Toyota's technical director, said he felt sorry for the No. 7 crew and acknowledged they were faster than the No. 8 team.

Albuquerque was congratulated by the president of Portugal via telephone call on becoming the first Portuguese driver to win the 24 Hours of Le Mans. He added, "It's my seventh time and I've been here quite a while. I was just waiting for when it's going to be my day. I've been searching for this podium and it's a dream. LMP2 is a great category with many good drivers. With 24 cars it was extremely competitive. We never knew who would be the winner." Hanson said he thought he lost the chance to win, "It was a very hectic last 10 minutes of the race and it made it for me. It's not as exciting if you're coasting home, just looking after the car, to if you're pushing like mad to bring it home in P1. It was a really exciting way to end it." Félix da Costa admitted fault for unbuckling his seatbelts and said he felt his team should have won because he believed they had the most consistent package. Davidson said Jota stopped using a fuel-saving plan when it became apparent United Autosports would not finish the race without making another pit stop. But he felt an extra lap behind the safety car could possibly have created a different scenario.

Lynn called his victory in LMGTE Pro the biggest of his career, adding the problems with the Aston Martin Vantage's speed in preceding years made it more special, "I'm very proud of what the team has been able to achieve and the vast improvement the car has made in sheer lap time and also in balance and reliability in every sense." Tincknell won on his debut for Aston Martin and said he learnt greatly over the course of the opening two stints when both Ferraris overtook him, using this to pass Daniel Serra later on. "It was a game of cat and mouse. We were on new tires and they were on old tires, and vice versa. We were never really sure how it was going to pan out, but we were confident that we had the car, the team and the people to do it." Calado said Ferrari was a little slower than Aston Martin through first to third gears and conceded it was the faster car, adding, "We couldn't have done any more really. We did what we could, and we basically just lacked pace, they were quicker than us. Second is not a great feeling, but we've just got to think ahead and try to improve the car for next year."

Vassleon said a lack of track grip caused by rainfall removing rubber and bringing oily substances to the surface the night before slowed the race. He admitted to being worried about Senna's performance during practice, and the first stint, before expressing surprise when Rebellion slowed. Calim Bouhadra, Rebellion's CEO, said slower traffic was the primary differentiator between the hybrid Toyota and Rebellion's non-hybrid cars early on and their only worry was managing the brakes for the race's end. Martin commented that the main reason Aston Martin won each of the GTE categories was by not switching the brake discs. LMGTE Am winner Jonathan Adam said it was the first time he had completed a 24-hour race without needing to change brakes.

The result moved Buemi, Hartley and Nakajima to the lead of the LMP Drivers' Championship with 175 points. Their teammates Conway, Kobayashi and López fell to second as Menezes, Nato and Senna maintained third place. Albuquerque and Hanson were fourth with their co-driver, Di Resta, fifth. Lynn and Martin drew to within 15 points of their teammates and GTE Drivers' Championship leaders, Sørensen and Thiim. Toyota and Aston Martin left Le Mans as the respective LMP1 Teams' and GTE Manufacturers' champions with one race left in the season.

== Official results ==
The minimum number of laps for classification at the finish (70 per cent of the overall race winner's distance) was 270 laps. Class winners are in bold.

Final race classification
Pos	Class	No.	Team	Drivers	Chassis	Tyre	Laps	Time/Reason
Pos	Class	No.	Team	Drivers	Engine	Tyre	Laps	Time/Reason
1	**LMP1**	**8**	**(Japan) Toyota Gazoo Racing**	**(Switzerland) Sébastien Buemi (New Zealand) Brendon Hartley (Japan) Kazuki Nakajima**	**Toyota TS050 Hybrid**	M	**387**	**24:01:45.305**
1	**LMP1**	**8**	**(Japan) Toyota Gazoo Racing**	**(Switzerland) Sébastien Buemi (New Zealand) Brendon Hartley (Japan) Kazuki Nakajima**	**Toyota H8909 2.4 L Hybrid Turbo V6**	M	**387**	**24:01:45.305**
2	LMP1	1	(Switzerland) Rebellion Racing	(United States) Gustavo Menezes (France) Norman Nato (Brazil) Bruno Senna	Rebellion R13	M	382	+5 laps
2	LMP1	1	(Switzerland) Rebellion Racing	(United States) Gustavo Menezes (France) Norman Nato (Brazil) Bruno Senna	Gibson GL458 4.5 L V8	M	382	+5 laps
3	LMP1	7	(Japan) Toyota Gazoo Racing	(United Kingdom) Mike Conway (Japan) Kamui Kobayashi (Argentina) José María López	Toyota TS050 Hybrid	M	381	+6 laps
3	LMP1	7	(Japan) Toyota Gazoo Racing	(United Kingdom) Mike Conway (Japan) Kamui Kobayashi (Argentina) José María López	Toyota H8909 2.4 L Hybrid Turbo V6	M	381	+6 laps
4	LMP1	3	(Switzerland) Rebellion Racing	(France) Nathanaël Berthon (Switzerland) Louis Delétraz (France) Romain Dumas	Rebellion R13	M	381	+6 laps
4	LMP1	3	(Switzerland) Rebellion Racing	(France) Nathanaël Berthon (Switzerland) Louis Delétraz (France) Romain Dumas	Gibson GL458 4.5 L V8	M	381	+6 laps
5	**LMP2**	**22**	**(United Kingdom) United Autosports**	**(Portugal) Filipe Albuquerque (United Kingdom) Phil Hanson (United Kingdom) Paul di Resta**	**Oreca 07**	M	**370**	**+17 laps**
5	**LMP2**	**22**	**(United Kingdom) United Autosports**	**(Portugal) Filipe Albuquerque (United Kingdom) Phil Hanson (United Kingdom) Paul di Resta**	**Gibson GK428 4.2 L V8**	M	**370**	**+17 laps**
6	LMP2	38	(United Kingdom) Jota	(Portugal) António Félix da Costa (United Kingdom) Anthony Davidson (Mexico) Roberto González	Oreca 07	G	370	+17 laps
6	LMP2	38	(United Kingdom) Jota	(Portugal) António Félix da Costa (United Kingdom) Anthony Davidson (Mexico) Roberto González	Gibson GK428 4.2 L V8	G	370	+17 laps
7	LMP2	31	(France) Panis Racing	(France) Julien Canal (France) Nico Jamin (France) Matthieu Vaxivière	Oreca 07	G	368	+19 laps
7	LMP2	31	(France) Panis Racing	(France) Julien Canal (France) Nico Jamin (France) Matthieu Vaxivière	Gibson GK428 4.2 L V8	G	368	+19 laps
8	LMP2	36	(France) Signatech Alpine Elf	(France) Thomas Laurent (Brazil) André Negrão (France) Pierre Ragues	Alpine A470	M	367	+20 laps
8	LMP2	36	(France) Signatech Alpine Elf	(France) Thomas Laurent (Brazil) André Negrão (France) Pierre Ragues	Gibson GK428 4.2 L V8	M	367	+20 laps
9	LMP2	26	(Russia) G-Drive Racing	(Denmark) Mikkel Jensen (Russia) Roman Rusinov (France) Jean-Éric Vergne	Aurus 01	M	367	+20 laps
9	LMP2	26	(Russia) G-Drive Racing	(Denmark) Mikkel Jensen (Russia) Roman Rusinov (France) Jean-Éric Vergne	Gibson GK428 4.2 L V8	M	367	+20 laps
10	LMP2	28	(France) IDEC Sport	(United Kingdom) Richard Bradley (France) Paul-Loup Chatin (France) Paul Lafargue	Oreca 07	M	366	+21 laps
10	LMP2	28	(France) IDEC Sport	(United Kingdom) Richard Bradley (France) Paul-Loup Chatin (France) Paul Lafargue	Gibson GK428 4.2 L V8	M	366	+21 laps
11	LMP2	25	(Portugal) Algarve Pro Racing	(United States) John Falb (United States) Matt McMurry (Switzerland) Simon Trummer	Oreca 07	G	365	+22 laps
11	LMP2	25	(Portugal) Algarve Pro Racing	(United States) John Falb (United States) Matt McMurry (Switzerland) Simon Trummer	Gibson GK428 4.2 L V8	G	365	+22 laps
12	LMP2	42	(Switzerland) Cool Racing	(Switzerland) Antonin Borga (Switzerland) Alexandre Coigny (France) Nicolas Lapierre	Oreca 07	M	365 (Note: The No. 42 Cool Racing Oreca-Gibson was penalized 2 minutes 3.880 seconds for Alexandre Coigny exceeding the maximum drive time of four hours in a six-hour period. The penalty demoted the car one position.)	+22 laps
12	LMP2	42	(Switzerland) Cool Racing	(Switzerland) Antonin Borga (Switzerland) Alexandre Coigny (France) Nicolas Lapierre	Gibson GK428 4.2 L V8	M	365	+22 laps
13	LMP2	50	(France) Richard Mille Racing Team	(Colombia) Tatiana Calderón (Germany) Sophia Flörsch (Netherlands) Beitske Visser	Oreca 07	M	364	+23 laps
13	LMP2	50	(France) Richard Mille Racing Team	(Colombia) Tatiana Calderón (Germany) Sophia Flörsch (Netherlands) Beitske Visser	Gibson GK428 4.2 L V8	M	364	+23 laps
14	LMP2	47	(Italy) Cetilar Racing	(Italy) Andrea Belicchi (Italy) Roberto Lacorte (Italy) Giorgio Sernagiotto	Dallara P217	M	363	+24 laps
14	LMP2	47	(Italy) Cetilar Racing	(Italy) Andrea Belicchi (Italy) Roberto Lacorte (Italy) Giorgio Sernagiotto	Gibson GK428 4.2 L V8	M	363	+24 laps
15	LMP2	17	(France) IDEC Sport	(United Kingdom) Jonathan Kennard (France) Patrick Pilet (United Kingdom) Kyle Tilley	Oreca 07	M	363	+24 laps
15	LMP2	17	(France) IDEC Sport	(United Kingdom) Jonathan Kennard (France) Patrick Pilet (United Kingdom) Kyle Tilley	Gibson GK428 4.2 L V8	M	363	+24 laps
16	LMP2	27	(United States) DragonSpeed USA	(United Kingdom) Ben Hanley (Sweden) Henrik Hedman (Netherlands) Renger van der Zande	Oreca 07	M	361	+26 laps
16	LMP2	27	(United States) DragonSpeed USA	(United Kingdom) Ben Hanley (Sweden) Henrik Hedman (Netherlands) Renger van der Zande	Gibson GK428 4.2 L V8	M	361	+26 laps
17	LMP2	32	(United Kingdom) United Autosports	(United Kingdom) Alex Brundle (United States) Will Owen (Netherlands) Job van Uitert	Oreca 07	M	359	+28 laps
17	LMP2	32	(United Kingdom) United Autosports	(United Kingdom) Alex Brundle (United States) Will Owen (Netherlands) Job van Uitert	Gibson GK428 4.2 L V8	M	359	+28 laps
18	LMP2	35	(Philippines) Eurasia Motorsport	(Australia) Nick Foster (Spain) Roberto Merhi (Japan) Nobuya Yamanaka	Ligier JS P217	M	351	+36 laps
18	LMP2	35	(Philippines) Eurasia Motorsport	(Australia) Nick Foster (Spain) Roberto Merhi (Japan) Nobuya Yamanaka	Gibson GK428 4.2 L V8	M	351	+36 laps
19	LMP2	29	(Netherlands) Racing Team Nederland	(Netherlands) Frits van Eerd (Netherlands) Giedo van der Garde (Netherlands) Nyck de Vries	Oreca 07	M	349	+38 laps
19	LMP2	29	(Netherlands) Racing Team Nederland	(Netherlands) Frits van Eerd (Netherlands) Giedo van der Garde (Netherlands) Nyck de Vries	Gibson GK428 4.2 L V8	M	349	+38 laps
20	**LMGTE; Pro**	**97**	**(United Kingdom) Aston Martin Racing**	**(United Kingdom) Alex Lynn (Belgium) Maxime Martin (United Kingdom) Harry Tincknell**	**Aston Martin Vantage AMR**	M	**346**	**+41 laps**
20	**LMGTE; Pro**	**97**	**(United Kingdom) Aston Martin Racing**	**(United Kingdom) Alex Lynn (Belgium) Maxime Martin (United Kingdom) Harry Tincknell**	**Aston Martin 4.0 L Turbo V8**	M	**346**	**+41 laps**
21	LMGTE; Pro	51	(Italy) AF Corse	(United Kingdom) James Calado (Italy) Alessandro Pier Guidi (Brazil) Daniel Serra	Ferrari 488 GTE Evo	M	346	+41 laps
21	LMGTE; Pro	51	(Italy) AF Corse	(United Kingdom) James Calado (Italy) Alessandro Pier Guidi (Brazil) Daniel Serra	Ferrari F154CB 3.9 L Turbo V8	M	346	+41 laps
22	LMGTE; Pro	95	(United Kingdom) Aston Martin Racing	(Denmark) Marco Sørensen (Denmark) Nicki Thiim (United Kingdom) Richard Westbrook	Aston Martin Vantage AMR	M	343	+44 laps
22	LMGTE; Pro	95	(United Kingdom) Aston Martin Racing	(Denmark) Marco Sørensen (Denmark) Nicki Thiim (United Kingdom) Richard Westbrook	Aston Martin 4.0 L Turbo V8	M	343	+44 laps
23	LMGTE; Pro	82	(United States) Risi Competizione	(France) Sébastien Bourdais (France) Jules Gounon (France) Olivier Pla	Ferrari 488 GTE Evo	M	339	+48 laps
23	LMGTE; Pro	82	(United States) Risi Competizione	(France) Sébastien Bourdais (France) Jules Gounon (France) Olivier Pla	Ferrari F154CB 3.9 L Turbo V8	M	339	+48 laps
24	**LMGTE; Am**	**90**	**(United Kingdom) TF Sport**	**(United Kingdom) Jonathan Adam (Republic of Ireland) Charlie Eastwood (Turkey) Salih Yoluç**	**Aston Martin Vantage AMR**	M	**339**	**+48 laps**
24	**LMGTE; Am**	**90**	**(United Kingdom) TF Sport**	**(United Kingdom) Jonathan Adam (Republic of Ireland) Charlie Eastwood (Turkey) Salih Yoluç**	**Aston Martin 4.0 L Turbo V8**	M	**339**	**+48 laps**
25	LMGTE; Am	77	(Germany) Dempsey-Proton Racing	(Australia) Matt Campbell (Italy) Riccardo Pera (Germany) Christian Ried	Porsche 911 RSR	M	339	+48 laps
25	LMGTE; Am	77	(Germany) Dempsey-Proton Racing	(Australia) Matt Campbell (Italy) Riccardo Pera (Germany) Christian Ried	Porsche 4.0 L Flat-6	M	339	+48 laps
26	LMGTE; Am	83	(Italy) AF Corse	(France) Emmanuel Collard (Denmark) Nicklas Nielsen (France) François Perrodo	Ferrari 488 GTE Evo	M	339	+48 laps
26	LMGTE; Am	83	(Italy) AF Corse	(France) Emmanuel Collard (Denmark) Nicklas Nielsen (France) François Perrodo	Ferrari F154CB 3.9 L Turbo V8	M	339	+48 laps
27	LMGTE; Am	56	(Germany) Team Project 1	(Italy) Matteo Cairoli (Norway) Egidio Perfetti (Netherlands) Larry ten Voorde	Porsche 911 RSR	M	339	+48 laps
27	LMGTE; Am	56	(Germany) Team Project 1	(Italy) Matteo Cairoli (Norway) Egidio Perfetti (Netherlands) Larry ten Voorde	Porsche 4.0 L Flat-6	M	339	+48 laps
28	LMP2	24	(United Kingdom) Nielsen Racing	(Canada) Garett Grist (United Kingdom) Alex Kapadia (United Kingdom) Anthony Wells	Oreca 07	M	338	+49 laps
28	LMP2	24	(United Kingdom) Nielsen Racing	(Canada) Garett Grist (United Kingdom) Alex Kapadia (United Kingdom) Anthony Wells	Gibson GK428 4.2 L V8	M	338	+49 laps
29	LMGTE; Am	86	(United Kingdom) Gulf Racing	(United Kingdom) Ben Barker (United Kingdom) Michael Wainwright (United Kingdom) Andrew Watson	Porsche 911 RSR	M	337	+50 laps
29	LMGTE; Am	86	(United Kingdom) Gulf Racing	(United Kingdom) Ben Barker (United Kingdom) Michael Wainwright (United Kingdom) Andrew Watson	Porsche 4.0 L Flat-6	M	337	+50 laps
30	LMGTE; Am	66	(United Kingdom) JMW Motorsport	(United States) Richard Heistand (Denmark) Jan Magnussen (United States) Max Root	Ferrari 488 GTE Evo	M	335	+52 laps
30	LMGTE; Am	66	(United Kingdom) JMW Motorsport	(United States) Richard Heistand (Denmark) Jan Magnussen (United States) Max Root	Ferrari F154CB 3.9 L Turbo V8	M	335	+52 laps
31	LMGTE; Pro	91	(Germany) Porsche GT Team	(Italy) Gianmaria Bruni (Austria) Richard Lietz (France) Frédéric Makowiecki	Porsche 911 RSR-19	M	335	+52 laps
31	LMGTE; Pro	91	(Germany) Porsche GT Team	(Italy) Gianmaria Bruni (Austria) Richard Lietz (France) Frédéric Makowiecki	Porsche 4.2 L Flat-6	M	335	+52 laps
32	LMGTE; Am	61	(Switzerland) Luzich Racing	(France) Côme Ledogar (Brazil) Oswaldo Negri Jr. (Puerto Rico) Francesco Piovanetti	Ferrari 488 GTE Evo	M	335	+52 laps
32	LMGTE; Am	61	(Switzerland) Luzich Racing	(France) Côme Ledogar (Brazil) Oswaldo Negri Jr. (Puerto Rico) Francesco Piovanetti	Ferrari F154CB 3.9 L Turbo V8	M	335	+52 laps
33	LMGTE; Am	98	(United Kingdom) Aston Martin Racing	(Canada) Paul Dalla Lana (Brazil) Augusto Farfus (United Kingdom) Ross Gunn	Aston Martin Vantage AMR	M	333	+54 laps
33	LMGTE; Am	98	(United Kingdom) Aston Martin Racing	(Canada) Paul Dalla Lana (Brazil) Augusto Farfus (United Kingdom) Ross Gunn	Aston Martin 4.0 L Turbo V8	M	333	+54 laps
34	LMGTE; Am	85	(Italy) Iron Lynx	(Switzerland) Rahel Frey (Denmark) Michelle Gatting (Italy) Manuela Gostner	Ferrari 488 GTE Evo	M	332	+55 laps
34	LMGTE; Am	85	(Italy) Iron Lynx	(Switzerland) Rahel Frey (Denmark) Michelle Gatting (Italy) Manuela Gostner	Ferrari F154CB 3.9 L Turbo V8	M	332	+55 laps
35	LMGTE; Pro	92	(Germany) Porsche GT Team	(Denmark) Michael Christensen (France) Kévin Estre (Belgium) Laurens Vanthoor	Porsche 911 RSR-19	M	331	+56 laps
35	LMGTE; Pro	92	(Germany) Porsche GT Team	(Denmark) Michael Christensen (France) Kévin Estre (Belgium) Laurens Vanthoor	Porsche 4.2 L Flat-6	M	331	+56 laps
36	LMGTE; Am	99	(Germany) Dempsey-Proton Racing	(France) Julien Andlauer (Thailand) Vutthikorn Inthraphuvasak (Switzerland) Lucas Légeret	Porsche 911 RSR	M	331	+56 laps
36	LMGTE; Am	99	(Germany) Dempsey-Proton Racing	(France) Julien Andlauer (Thailand) Vutthikorn Inthraphuvasak (Switzerland) Lucas Légeret	Porsche 4.0 L Flat-6	M	331	+56 laps
37	LMGTE; Am	60	(Italy) Iron Lynx	(Italy) Sergio Pianezzola (Italy) Paolo Ruberti (Italy) Claudio Schiavoni	Ferrari 488 GTE Evo	M	331	+56 laps
37	LMGTE; Am	60	(Italy) Iron Lynx	(Italy) Sergio Pianezzola (Italy) Paolo Ruberti (Italy) Claudio Schiavoni	Ferrari F154CB 3.9 L Turbo V8	M	331	+56 laps
38	LMGTE; Am	78	(Germany) Proton Competition	(Italy) Michele Beretta (Austria) Horst Felbermayr Jr. (Netherlands) Max van Splunteren	Porsche 911 RSR	M	330	+57 laps
38	LMGTE; Am	78	(Germany) Proton Competition	(Italy) Michele Beretta (Austria) Horst Felbermayr Jr. (Netherlands) Max van Splunteren	Porsche 4.0 L Flat-6	M	330	+57 laps
39	LMGTE; Am	54	(Italy) AF Corse	(Italy) Francesco Castellacci (Italy) Giancarlo Fisichella (Switzerland) Thomas Flohr	Ferrari 488 GTE Evo	M	330	+57 laps
39	LMGTE; Am	54	(Italy) AF Corse	(Italy) Francesco Castellacci (Italy) Giancarlo Fisichella (Switzerland) Thomas Flohr	Ferrari F154CB 3.9 L Turbo V8	M	330	+57 laps
40	LMGTE; Am	57	(Germany) Team Project 1	(Netherlands) Jeroen Bleekemolen (Brazil) Felipe Fraga (United States) Ben Keating	Porsche 911 RSR	M	326	+61 laps
40	LMGTE; Am	57	(Germany) Team Project 1	(Netherlands) Jeroen Bleekemolen (Brazil) Felipe Fraga (United States) Ben Keating	Porsche 4.0 L Flat-6	M	326	+61 laps
41	LMGTE; Am	62	(United Kingdom) Red River Sport	(United Kingdom) Bonamy Grimes (United Kingdom) Charles Hollings (United Kingdom) Johnny Mowlem	Ferrari 488 GTE Evo	M	325	+62 laps
41	LMGTE; Am	62	(United Kingdom) Red River Sport	(United Kingdom) Bonamy Grimes (United Kingdom) Charles Hollings (United Kingdom) Johnny Mowlem	Ferrari F154CB 3.9 L Turbo V8	M	325	+62 laps
42	LMP2	34	(Poland) Inter Europol Competition	(Austria) René Binder (Russia) Matevos Isaakyan (Poland) Jakub Śmiechowski	Ligier JS P217	M	316 (Note: The No. 34 Inter Europol Ligier-Gibson was penalized 9 laps plus 56 seconds for René Binder failing to meet the minimum overall drive time of six hours. The penalty demoted the car one position.)	+71 laps
42	LMP2	34	(Poland) Inter Europol Competition	(Austria) René Binder (Russia) Matevos Isaakyan (Poland) Jakub Śmiechowski	Gibson GK428 4.2 L V8	M	316	+71 laps
43	LMGTE; Am	89	(Germany) Team Project 1	(France) "Steve Brooks" (Greece) Andreas Laskaratos (France) Julien Piguet	Porsche 911 RSR	M	313	+74 laps
43	LMGTE; Am	89	(Germany) Team Project 1	(France) "Steve Brooks" (Greece) Andreas Laskaratos (France) Julien Piguet	Porsche 4.0 L Flat-6	M	313	+74 laps
NC	LMGTE; Pro	71	(Italy) AF Corse	(United Kingdom) Sam Bird (Spain) Miguel Molina (Italy) Davide Rigon	Ferrari 488 GTE Evo	M	340	Incomplete final lap
NC	LMGTE; Pro	71	(Italy) AF Corse	(United Kingdom) Sam Bird (Spain) Miguel Molina (Italy) Davide Rigon	Ferrari F154CB 3.9 L Turbo V8	M	340	Incomplete final lap
NC	LMGTE; Am	88	(Germany) Dempsey-Proton Racing	(United States) Dominique Bastien (Belgium) Adrien de Leener (Austria) Thomas Preining	Porsche 911 RSR	M	238	Insufficient distance
NC	LMGTE; Am	88	(Germany) Dempsey-Proton Racing	(United States) Dominique Bastien (Belgium) Adrien de Leener (Austria) Thomas Preining	Porsche 4.0 L Flat-6	M	238	Insufficient distance
DNF	LMP2	39	(France) SO24-HAS by Graff	(Australia) James Allen (France) Vincent Capillaire (France) Charles Milesi	Oreca 07	M	357	Contact
DNF	LMP2	39	(France) SO24-HAS by Graff	(Australia) James Allen (France) Vincent Capillaire (France) Charles Milesi	Gibson GK428 4.2 L V8	M	357	Contact
DNF	LMGTE; Am	72	(Chinese Taipei) Hub Auto Racing	(United Kingdom) Tom Blomqvist (Chinese Taipei) Morris Chen (Brazil) Marcos Gomes	Ferrari 488 GTE Evo	M	273	Engine
DNF	LMGTE; Am	72	(Chinese Taipei) Hub Auto Racing	(United Kingdom) Tom Blomqvist (Chinese Taipei) Morris Chen (Brazil) Marcos Gomes	Ferrari F154CB 3.9 L Turbo V8	M	273	Engine
DNF	LMGTE; Am	75	(Italy) Iron Lynx	(Italy) Matteo Cressoni (Italy) Rino Mastronardi (Italy) Andrea Piccini	Ferrari 488 GTE Evo	M	211	Fire
DNF	LMGTE; Am	75	(Italy) Iron Lynx	(Italy) Matteo Cressoni (Italy) Rino Mastronardi (Italy) Andrea Piccini	Ferrari F154CB 3.9 L Turbo V8	M	211	Fire
DNF	LMP2	21	(United States) DragonSpeed USA	(France) Timothé Buret (Colombia) Juan Pablo Montoya (Mexico) Memo Rojas	Oreca 07	M	192	Misfire
DNF	LMP2	21	(United States) DragonSpeed USA	(France) Timothé Buret (Colombia) Juan Pablo Montoya (Mexico) Memo Rojas	Gibson GK428 4.2 L V8	M	192	Misfire
DNF	LMGTE; Pro	63	(United States) WeatherTech Racing	(United States) Cooper MacNeil (United States) Jeff Segal (Finland) Toni Vilander	Ferrari 488 GTE Evo	M	185	Collision damage
DNF	LMGTE; Pro	63	(United States) WeatherTech Racing	(United States) Cooper MacNeil (United States) Jeff Segal (Finland) Toni Vilander	Ferrari F154CB 3.9 L Turbo V8	M	185	Collision damage
DNF	LMGTE; Am	70	(Japan) MR Racing	(Monaco) Vincent Abril (Japan) Kei Cozzolino (Japan) Takeshi Kimura	Ferrari 488 GTE Evo	M	172	Suspension
DNF	LMGTE; Am	70	(Japan) MR Racing	(Monaco) Vincent Abril (Japan) Kei Cozzolino (Japan) Takeshi Kimura	Ferrari F154CB 3.9 L Turbo V8	M	172	Suspension
DNF	LMP2	16	(Russia) G-Drive Racing by Algarve	(Republic of Ireland) Ryan Cullen (United Kingdom) Oliver Jarvis (United Kingdom) Nick Tandy	Aurus 01	G	105	Electrical
DNF	LMP2	16	(Russia) G-Drive Racing by Algarve	(Republic of Ireland) Ryan Cullen (United Kingdom) Oliver Jarvis (United Kingdom) Nick Tandy	Gibson GK428 4.2 L V8	G	105	Electrical
DNF	LMP2	30	(France) Duqueine Team	(France) Tristan Gommendy (Switzerland) Jonathan Hirschi (Russia) Konstantin Tereshchenko	Oreca 07	M	100	Contact
DNF	LMP2	30	(France) Duqueine Team	(France) Tristan Gommendy (Switzerland) Jonathan Hirschi (Russia) Konstantin Tereshchenko	Gibson GK428 4.2 L V8	M	100	Contact
DNF	LMP1	4	(Austria) ByKolles Racing Team	(France) Tom Dillmann (Canada) Bruno Spengler (United Kingdom) Oliver Webb	ENSO CLM P1/01	M	97	Bodywork
DNF	LMP1	4	(Austria) ByKolles Racing Team	(France) Tom Dillmann (Canada) Bruno Spengler (United Kingdom) Oliver Webb	Gibson GL458 4.5 L V8	M	97	Bodywork
DNF	LMP2	33	(Denmark) High Class Racing	(Denmark) Anders Fjordbach (United States) Mark Patterson (Japan) Kenta Yamashita	Oreca 07	M	88	Gearbox
DNF	LMP2	33	(Denmark) High Class Racing	(Denmark) Anders Fjordbach (United States) Mark Patterson (Japan) Kenta Yamashita	Gibson GK428 4.2 L V8	M	88	Gearbox
DNF	LMGTE; Am	52	(Italy) AF Corse	(Germany) Steffen Görig (Switzerland) Christoph Ulrich (Sweden) Alexander West	Ferrari 488 GTE Evo	M	80	Contact
DNF	LMGTE; Am	52	(Italy) AF Corse	(Germany) Steffen Görig (Switzerland) Christoph Ulrich (Sweden) Alexander West	Ferrari F154CB 3.9 L Turbo V8	M	80	Contact
DNF	LMGTE; Am	55	(Switzerland) Spirit of Race	(United Kingdom) Duncan Cameron (Republic of Ireland) Matt Griffin (United Kingdom) Aaron Scott	Ferrari 488 GTE Evo	M	78	Puncture damage
DNF	LMGTE; Am	55	(Switzerland) Spirit of Race	(United Kingdom) Duncan Cameron (Republic of Ireland) Matt Griffin (United Kingdom) Aaron Scott	Ferrari F154CB 3.9 L Turbo V8	M	78	Puncture damage
DNF	LMP2	11	(United States) EuroInternational	(Belgium) Christophe d'Ansembourg (France) Erik Maris (France) Adrien Tambay	Ligier JS P217	M	26	Alternator
DNF	LMP2	11	(United States) EuroInternational	(Belgium) Christophe d'Ansembourg (France) Erik Maris (France) Adrien Tambay	Gibson GK428 4.2 L V8	M	26	Alternator
DSQ	LMP2	37	(China) Jackie Chan DC Racing	(France) Gabriel Aubry (United Kingdom) Will Stevens (Netherlands) Ho-Pin Tung	Oreca 07	G	141	Disqualified (Note: The No. 37 Jackie Chan DC Racing Oreca was disqualified for receiving outside assistance for repairs while the car was stopped on course.)
DSQ	LMP2	37	(China) Jackie Chan DC Racing	(France) Gabriel Aubry (United Kingdom) Will Stevens (Netherlands) Ho-Pin Tung	Gibson GK428 4.2 L V8	G	141	Disqualified

Tyre manufacturers
Key
Symbol	Tyre manufacturer
**G**	Goodyear
**M**	Michelin

== Championship standings after the race ==
2019–2020 LMP World Endurance Drivers' Championship
Pos.	+/–	Driver	Points
1	1	(Switzerland) Sébastien Buemi (New Zealand) Brendon Hartley (Japan) Kazuki Nakajima	175
2	1	(United Kingdom) Mike Conway (Japan) Kamui Kobayashi (Argentina) José María López	168
3		(United States) Gustavo Menezes (France) Norman Nato (Brazil) Bruno Senna	145
4		(Portugal) Filipe Albuquerque (United Kingdom) Phil Hanson	78
5		(United Kingdom) Paul di Resta	70

2019–2020 LMP1 World Endurance Championship
Pos.	+/–	Team	Points
1		(Japan) Toyota Gazoo Racing	202
2		(Switzerland) Rebellion Racing	145
3		(United Kingdom) Team LNT	29

- Note: Only the top five positions are included for Drivers' Championship standings.

2019–2020 World Endurance GTE Drivers' Championship
Pos.	+/–	Driver	Points
1		(Denmark) Marco Sørensen (Denmark) Nicki Thiim	157
2	2	(United Kingdom) Alex Lynn (Belgium) Maxime Martin	142
3		(United Kingdom) James Calado (Italy) Alessandro Pier Guidi	131
4	2	(Denmark) Michael Christensen (France) Kévin Estre	109
5		(Italy) Gianmaria Bruni (Austria) Richard Lietz	84

2019–2020 World Endurance GTE Manufacturers' Championship
Pos.	+/–	Constructor	Points
1		(United Kingdom) Aston Martin	299
2		(Germany) Porsche	223
3		(Italy) Ferrari	218

- Note: Only the top five positions are included for the Drivers' Championship standings.

== See also ==
- 2020 Road to Le Mans

== Footnotes ==
FIA World Endurance Championship
Previous race: 6 Hours of Spa-Francorchamps	2019–20 season	Next race: 8 Hours of Bahrain
