= List of FIA World Endurance champions =

List of auto racing series Characmpions

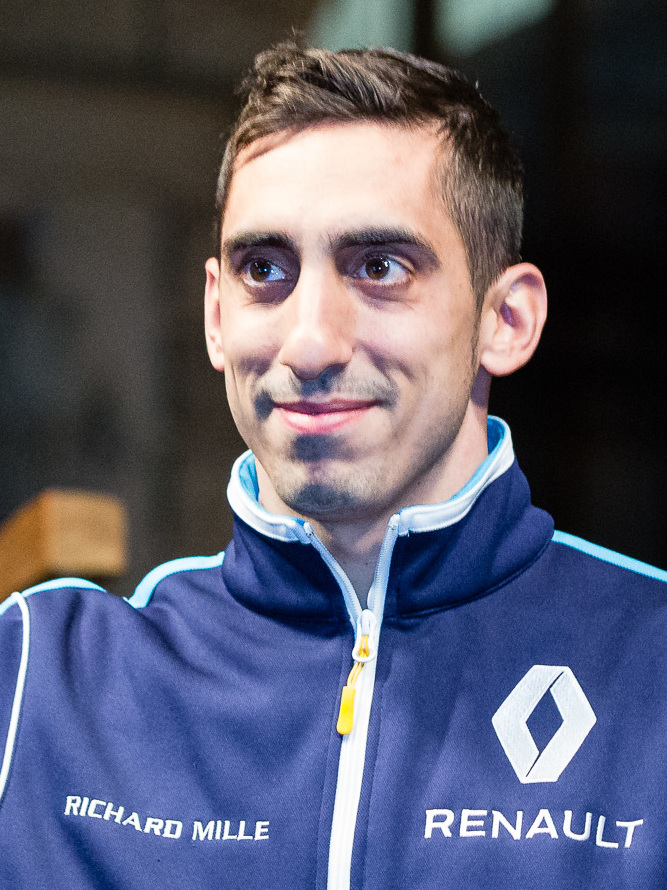
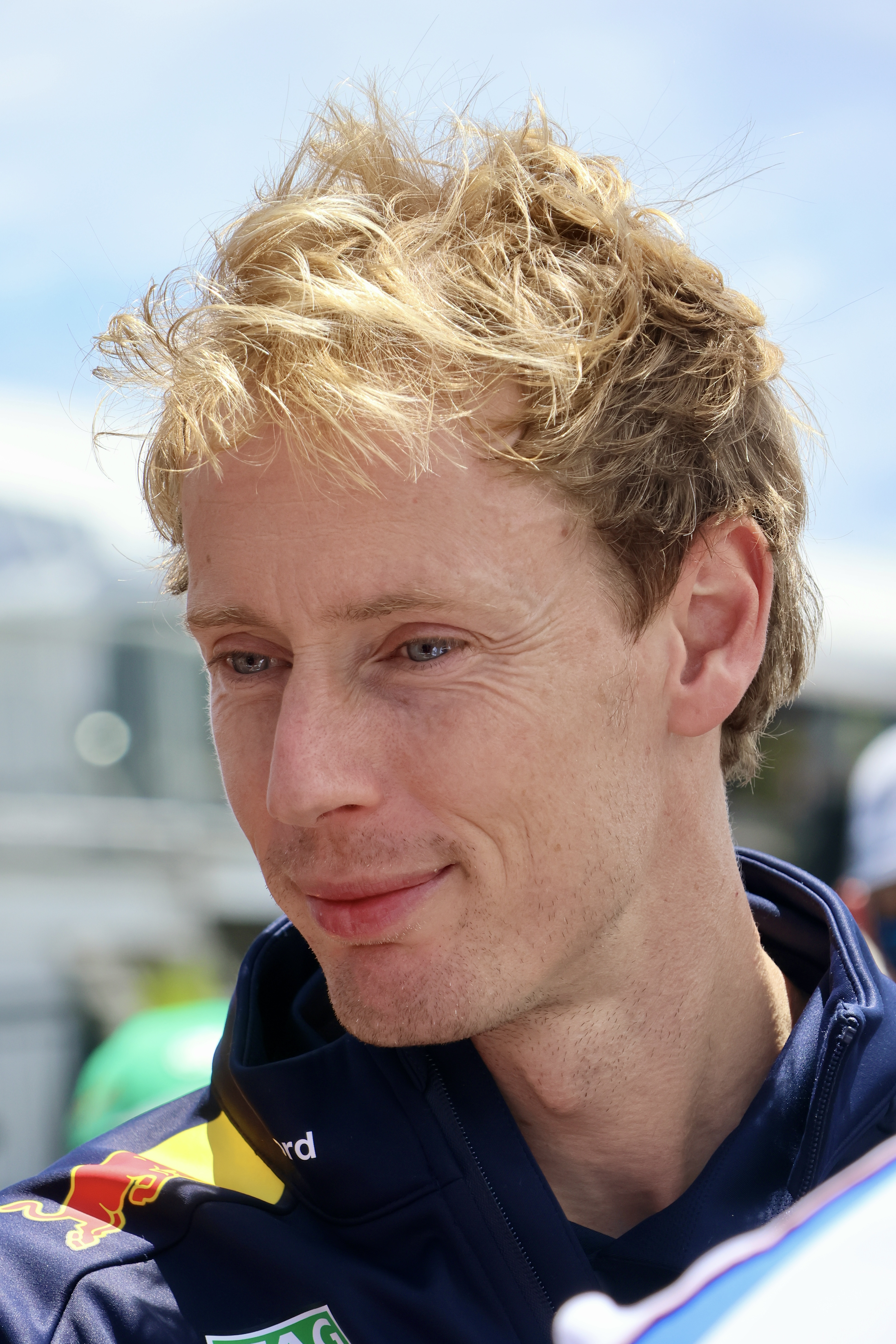
The current FIA World Endurance Drivers' Champions, Sébastien Buemi, Brendon Hartley, and Ryo Hirakawa

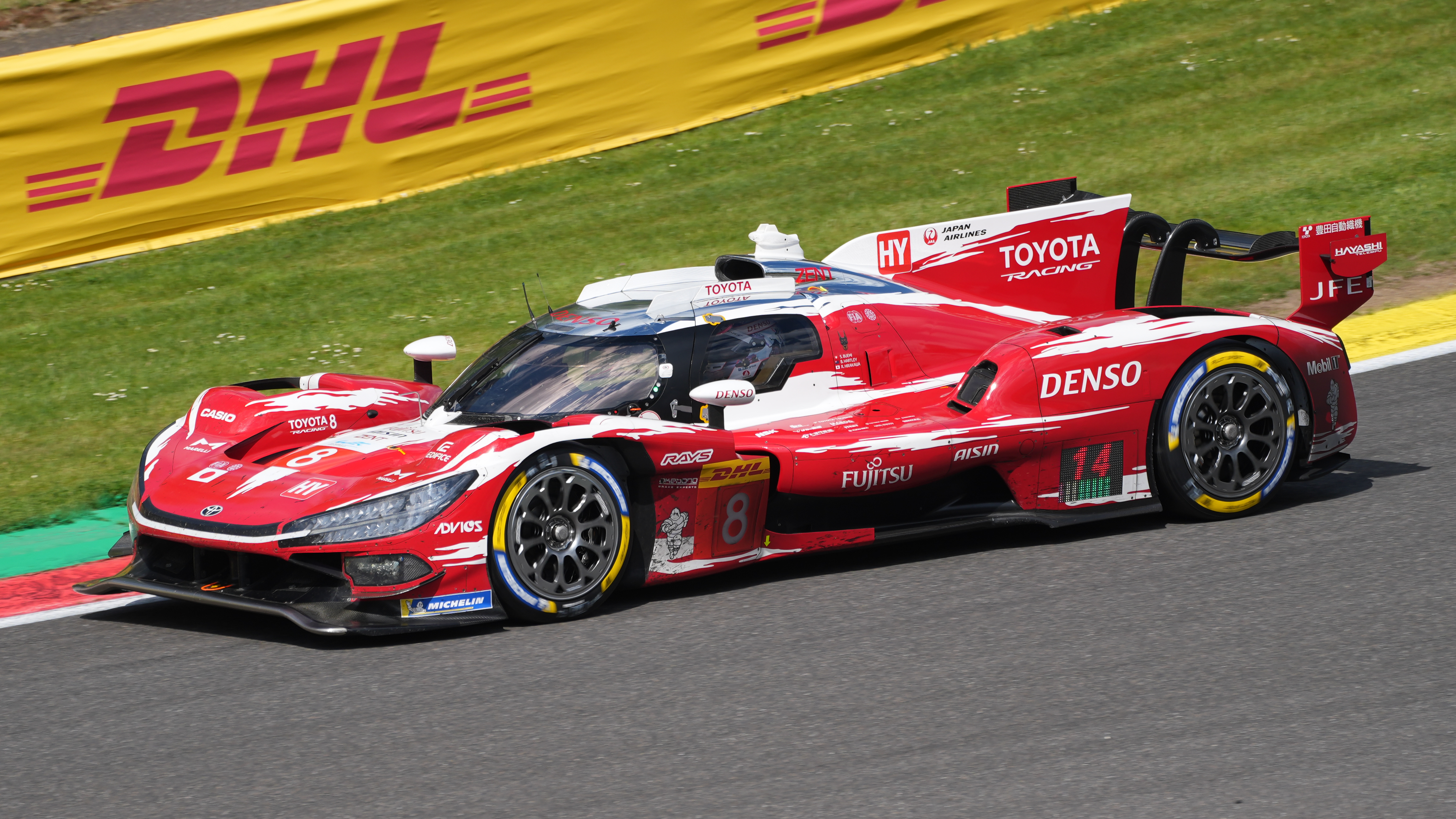
Current Hypercar World Endurance Champions Toyota Gazoo Racing's Toyota TR010 Hybrid

The FIA World Endurance Championship (WEC) is an endurance auto racing series administered by the governing body of motorsport, the Fédération Internationale de l'Automobile (FIA), and co-organised and promoted by the automotive group, the Automobile Club de l'Ouest (ACO). There were two types of car called Le Mans Prototype (LMP) and Le Mans Grand Touring Endurance (LMGTE) divided into four classes when the WEC began in 2012: Le Mans Prototype 1 (LMP1), Le Mans Prototype 2 (LMP2), Le Mans Grand Touring Endurance Pro (LMGTE Pro) and Le Mans Grand Touring Endurance Am (LMGTE Am). The Le Mans Hypercar (Hypercar) category was introduced in the 2021 season to replace the LMP1 class and the Le Mans Daytona Hybrid (LMDh) cars were introduced in the 2022 championship. The LMGTE Pro class was discontinued after the 2022 championship while the LMP2 and LMGTE Am categories were dropped following the 2023 season. The LMGT3 category based on GT3 machinery replaced LMGTE Am and joined the Hypercar class in a revised two full-season class structure from the 2024 season.

The series awards international championships, cups, and trophies to the most successful drivers, teams, and manufacturers in each of the series' categories over the course of a season. Points are awarded based on individual race results as well as for earning pole position in qualifying, with the highest tally of points winning the respective championship, cup, or trophy. The highest awards in the series are the FIA World Endurance Drivers' Championship and the FIA World Endurance Manufacturers' Championship, both of which centre around participants in the Hypercar category. The champions are not officially crowned until the FIA Prize Giving Ceremony held in December following the conclusion of the WEC season.

As of the 2026 season, 91 drivers have won a WEC title. There have been 25 overall World Drivers' Champions and six LMP1 Private Drivers' Trophy winners. Sébastien Buemi and Brendon Hartley, with five victories, have won the most overall World Drivers' Championships. Ryo Hirakawa is third with three championship wins. Toyota have won the most overall World Manufacturers' and Drivers' Championships with nine. Of the 25 drivers to win an LMP2 title, Julien Canal and Nicolas Lapierre hold the record for the most Drivers' Championships in the category with two. From the nine LMP2 Endurance Trophy for Teams winners, Signatech Alpine have earned the most titles with two. 30 drivers have won a LMGTE title in either the Pro or Am categories. James Calado, Alessandro Pier Guidi, François Perrodo and Marco Sørensen have achieved the most LMGTE Drivers' titles in any category with three and Ferrari have won the most LMGTE World Manufacturers and Cup titles with seven.

== Key ==
Tyre manufacturers
Symbol	Tyre manufacturer
D	Dunlop
G	Goodyear
M	Michelin

Key
*	Denotes that the season is still in progress

== World Championships ==
=== World Endurance Drivers' Championship ===
Held since the inception of the series, the Drivers' Championship was initially open to all participants in the FIA World Endurance Championship. This was altered for the 2013 season with the introduction of the FIA World Endurance Cup for GT Drivers as well as the FIA Endurance Trophies for LMP2 and LMGTE Am drivers. The Drivers' Championship was then limited to participants in the LMP1 and LMP2 categories, although LMP2 drivers and privately entered LMP1 drivers are also eligible for their own FIA Trophies. LMDh drivers were not eligible to accumulate points in the 2022 season since they could only participate on a race-by-race basis.

Winners of the World Endurance Drivers' Championship
Season	Drivers	Team	Manufacturer	Tyre	Poles	Wins	Podiums	Points	Clinched	Margin	Ref
2012	Marcel Fässler (CHE)	Audi Sport Team Joest (DEU)	Audi (DEU)	M	3	3	7	172.5	Race 8 of 8	13.5	
2012	André Lotterer (DEU)	Audi Sport Team Joest (DEU)	Audi (DEU)	M	3	3	7	172.5	Race 8 of 8	13.5	
2012	Benoît Tréluyer (FRA)	Audi Sport Team Joest (DEU)	Audi (DEU)	M	3	3	7	172.5	Race 8 of 8	13.5	
2013	Loïc Duval (FRA)	Audi Sport Team Joest (DEU)	Audi (DEU)	M	2	3	7	162	Race 7 of 8	12.75	
2013	Tom Kristensen (DNK)	Audi Sport Team Joest (DEU)	Audi (DEU)	M	2	3	7	162	Race 7 of 8	12.75	
2013	Allan McNish (GBR)	Audi Sport Team Joest (DEU)	Audi (DEU)	M	2	3	7	162	Race 7 of 8	12.75	
2014	Sébastien Buemi (CHE)	Toyota Racing (JPN)	Toyota (JPN)	M	2	4	7	166	Race 7 of 8	39	
2014	Anthony Davidson (GBR)	Toyota Racing (JPN)	Toyota (JPN)	M	2	4	7	166	Race 7 of 8	39	
2015	Timo Bernhard (DEU)	Porsche Team (DEU)	Porsche (DEU)	M	5	4	6	166	Race 8 of 8	5	
2015	Brendon Hartley (NZL)	Porsche Team (DEU)	Porsche (DEU)	M	5	4	6	166	Race 8 of 8	5	
2015	Mark Webber (AUS)	Porsche Team (DEU)	Porsche (DEU)	M	5	4	6	166	Race 8 of 8	5	
2016	Romain Dumas (FRA)	Porsche Team (DEU)	Porsche (DEU)	M	1	2	3	160	Race 9 of 9	12.5	
2016	Neel Jani (CHE)	Porsche Team (DEU)	Porsche (DEU)	M	1	2	3	160	Race 9 of 9	12.5	
2016	Marc Lieb (DEU)	Porsche Team (DEU)	Porsche (DEU)	M	1	2	3	160	Race 9 of 9	12.5	
2017	Earl Bamber (NZL)	Porsche LMP Team (DEU)	Porsche (DEU)	M	2	4	8	208	Race 8 of 9	25	
2017	Timo Bernhard (DEU)	Porsche LMP Team (DEU)	Porsche (DEU)	M	2	4	8	208	Race 8 of 9	25	
2017	Brendon Hartley (NZL)	Porsche LMP Team (DEU)	Porsche (DEU)	M	2	4	8	208	Race 8 of 9	25	
2018–19	Fernando Alonso (ESP)	Toyota Gazoo Racing (JPN)	Toyota (JPN)	M	4	5	7	198	Race 8 of 8	41	
2018–19	Sébastien Buemi (CHE)	Toyota Gazoo Racing (JPN)	Toyota (JPN)	M	4	5	7	198	Race 8 of 8	41	
2018–19	Kazuki Nakajima (JPN)	Toyota Gazoo Racing (JPN)	Toyota (JPN)	M	4	5	7	198	Race 8 of 8	41	
2019–20	Mike Conway (GBR)	Toyota Gazoo Racing (JPN)	Toyota (JPN)	M	3	4	8	207	Race 8 of 8	5	
2019–20	Kamui Kobayashi (JPN)	Toyota Gazoo Racing (JPN)	Toyota (JPN)	M	3	4	8	207	Race 8 of 8	5	
2019–20	José María López (ARG)	Toyota Gazoo Racing (JPN)	Toyota (JPN)	M	3	4	8	207	Race 8 of 8	5	
2021	Mike Conway (GBR)	Toyota Gazoo Racing (JPN)	Toyota (JPN)	M	4	3	6	173	Race 6 of 6	5	
2021	Kamui Kobayashi (JPN)	Toyota Gazoo Racing (JPN)	Toyota (JPN)	M	4	3	6	173	Race 6 of 6	5	
2021	José María López (ARG)	Toyota Gazoo Racing (JPN)	Toyota (JPN)	M	4	3	6	173	Race 6 of 6	5	
2022	Sébastien Buemi (CHE)	Toyota Gazoo Racing (JPN)	Toyota (JPN)	M	2	2	5	149	Race 6 of 6	5	
2022	Brendon Hartley (NZL)	Toyota Gazoo Racing (JPN)	Toyota (JPN)	M	2	2	5	149	Race 6 of 6	5	
2022	Ryo Hirakawa (JPN)	Toyota Gazoo Racing (JPN)	Toyota (JPN)	M	2	2	5	149	Race 6 of 6	5	
2023	Sébastien Buemi (CHE)	Toyota Gazoo Racing (JPN)	Toyota (JPN)	M	2	2	6	172	Race 7 of 7	27	
2023	Brendon Hartley (NZL)	Toyota Gazoo Racing (JPN)	Toyota (JPN)	M	2	2	6	172	Race 7 of 7	27	
2023	Ryo Hirakawa (JPN)	Toyota Gazoo Racing (JPN)	Toyota (JPN)	M	2	2	6	172	Race 7 of 7	27	
2024	Kévin Estre (FRA)	Porsche Penske Motorsport (DEU)	Porsche (DEU)	M	1	2	5	150	Race 8 of 8	37	
2024	André Lotterer (DEU)	Porsche Penske Motorsport (DEU)	Porsche (DEU)	M	1	2	5	150	Race 8 of 8	37	
2024	Laurens Vanthoor (BEL)	Porsche Penske Motorsport (DEU)	Porsche (DEU)	M	1	2	5	150	Race 8 of 8	37	
2025	James Calado (GBR)	Ferrari AF Corse (ITA)	Ferrari (ITA)	M	2	2	4	133	Race 8 of 8	16	
2025	Antonio Giovinazzi (ITA)	Ferrari AF Corse (ITA)	Ferrari (ITA)	M	2	2	4	133	Race 8 of 8	16	
2025	Alessandro Pier Guidi (ITA)	Ferrari AF Corse (ITA)	Ferrari (ITA)	M	2	2	4	133	Race 8 of 8	16	
2026	Sébastien Buemi (CHE)	Toyota Racing (JPN)	Toyota (JPN)	M	0	3	4	115	Race 8 of 8	18	
2026	Brendon Hartley (NZL)	Toyota Racing (JPN)	Toyota (JPN)	M	0	3	4	115	Race 8 of 8	18	
2026	Ryo Hirakawa (JPN)	Toyota Racing (JPN)	Toyota (JPN)	M	0	3	4	115	Race 8 of 8	18	

=== World Endurance GT Drivers' Championship ===
The World Endurance Cup for GT Drivers was created in 2013 to give LMGTE drivers their own title separate from the World Drivers' Championship, before being promoted to World Championship status in 2017. Drivers in both the LMGTE Pro and LMGTE Am categories were eligible for the overall championship, although LMGTE Am drivers are also eligible for their own FIA Trophy.

A grey background and the † symbol denotes a season in which the World Cup for GT Drivers was awarded.

Winners of the World Endurance GT Drivers' Championship
Season	Drivers	Team	Manufacturer	Tyre	Poles	Wins	Podiums	Points	Clinched	Margin	Ref
2013†	Gianmaria Bruni (ITA)	AF Corse (ITA)	Ferrari (ITA)	M	1	3	5	145	Race 8 of 8	10	
2014†	Gianmaria Bruni (ITA)	AF Corse (ITA)	Ferrari (ITA)	M	4	4	5	168	Race 7 of 8	33.5	
2014†	Toni Vilander (FIN)	AF Corse (ITA)	Ferrari (ITA)	M	4	4	5	168	Race 7 of 8	33.5	
2015†	Richard Lietz (AUT)	Porsche Team Manthey (DEU)	Porsche (DEU)	M	0	3	5	145	Race 8 of 8	13.5	
2016†	Marco Sørensen (DNK)	Aston Martin Racing (GBR)	Aston Martin (GBR)	D	3	2	6	156	Race 9 of 9	22	
2016†	Nicki Thiim (DNK)	Aston Martin Racing (GBR)	Aston Martin (GBR)	D	3	2	6	156	Race 9 of 9	22	
2017	James Calado (GBR)	AF Corse (ITA)	Ferrari (ITA)	M	0	3	7	153	Race 9 of 9	8	
2017	Alessandro Pier Guidi (ITA)	AF Corse (ITA)	Ferrari (ITA)	M	0	3	7	153	Race 9 of 9	8	
2018–19	Michael Christensen (DNK)	Porsche GT Team (DEU)	Porsche (DEU)	M	1	2	6	155	Race 8 of 8	18.5	
2018–19	Kévin Estre (FRA)	Porsche GT Team (DEU)	Porsche (DEU)	M	1	2	6	155	Race 8 of 8	18.5	
2019–20	Marco Sørensen (DNK)	Aston Martin Racing (GBR)	Aston Martin (GBR)	M	1	3	5	172	Race 8 of 8	24	
2019–20	Nicki Thiim (DNK)	Aston Martin Racing (GBR)	Aston Martin (GBR)	M	1	3	5	172	Race 8 of 8	24	
2021	James Calado (GBR)	AF Corse (ITA)	Ferrari (ITA)	M	0	3	6	177	Race 6 of 6	11	
2021	Alessandro Pier Guidi (ITA)	AF Corse (ITA)	Ferrari (ITA)	M	0	3	6	177	Race 6 of 6	11	
2022	James Calado (GBR)	AF Corse (ITA)	Ferrari (ITA)	M	1	2	4	135	Race 6 of 6	3	
2022	Alessandro Pier Guidi (ITA)	AF Corse (ITA)	Ferrari (ITA)	M	1	2	4	135	Race 6 of 6	3	

=== World Manufacturers' Championship ===
The Manufacturers' Championship has been exclusive to LMP1 entries supported by major automotive manufacturers. Points were awarded to the leading car from each manufacturer until the 2014 season when the top two finishers from each manufacturer were eligible for points. In 2014 the LMP1 class was also divided, with manufacturers limited solely to the LMP1-H category. For the 2012 season, only the scores from six events counted towards the championship, the 24 Hours of Le Mans plus the five best race results over the season.

Following the 2017 season the Manufacturers' Championship was dropped due to a lack of manufacturer competition in LMP1. A new LMP1 World Championship was created to be awarded to teams instead. For the 2022 season, the championship format was changed from teams to manufacturers. LMDh competitors were ineligible for championship points because they were only permitted to enter on a race-by-race basis.

Winners of the World Manufacturers' Championship
Season	Manufacturer	Cars	Tyre	Poles	Wins	Podiums	Points	Clinched	Margin	Ref
2012	Audi (DEU)	Audi R18 TDI	M	5	5 (Note: Includes third manufacturer entries at events in which additional entries were not eligible for World Manufacturers' Championship points)	17	173	Race 4 of 8	77	
2012	Audi (DEU)	Audi R18 ultra	M	5	5	17	173	Race 4 of 8	77	
2012	Audi (DEU)	Audi R18 e-tron quattro	M	5	5	17	173	Race 4 of 8	77	
2013	Audi (DEU)	Audi R18 e-tron quattro	M	5	6	15	207	Race 6 of 8	64.5	
2014	Toyota (JPN)	Toyota TS040 Hybrid	M	4	5	12	289	Race 8 of 8	45	
2015	Porsche (DEU)	Porsche 919 Hybrid	M	8	6	13	344	Race 7 of 8	80	
2016	Porsche (DEU)	Porsche 919 Hybrid	M	3	6	9	324	Race 8 of 9	58	
2017	Porsche (DEU)	Porsche 919 Hybrid	M	5	4	15	337	Race 8 of 9	50.5	
2022	Toyota (JPN)	Toyota GR010 Hybrid	M	3	4	10	186	Race 6 of 6	42	
2023	Toyota (JPN)	Toyota GR010 Hybrid	M	5	6	11	217	Race 6 of 7	56	
2024	Toyota (JPN)	Toyota GR010 Hybrid	M	2	4	5	190	Race 8 of 8	2	
2025	Ferrari (ITA)	Ferrari 499P	M	3	3	8	245	Race 8 of 8	71	
2026	Toyota (JPN)	Toyota TR010 Hybrid	M	0	4	7	215	Race 7 of 8	43	

=== Hypercar World Endurance Championship ===
With a lack of manufacturers in the LMP1 championship for the 2018–19 season, a new World Championship was created to be awarded to LMP1 teams in place of the former manufacturers' championship. Unlike the manufacturers' championship, only the top scoring car from each team is eligible to score points. With Hypercar replacing LMP1 as the top class in the WEC for the 2021 season, this was changed to the Hypercar competitor who scored the greatest amount of points after considering the results of their best placed car in the overall classification of each race in the 2021 season.

A grey background and the † symbol denotes a season in which the LMP1 World Endurance Championship was awarded.

Winners of the Hypercar World Endurance Championship
Season	Team	Cars	Tyre	Poles	Wins	Podiums	Points	Clinched	Margin	Ref
2018–19†	Toyota Gazoo Racing (JPN)	Toyota TS050 Hybrid	M	8	7	13	216	Race 7 of 8	82	
2019–20†	Toyota Gazoo Racing (JPN)	Toyota TS050 Hybrid	M	4	6	16	241	Race 7 of 8	96	
2021	Toyota Gazoo Racing (JPN)	Toyota GR010 Hybrid	M	5	6	11	206	Race 5 of 6	78	

=== World GT Manufacturers' Championship ===
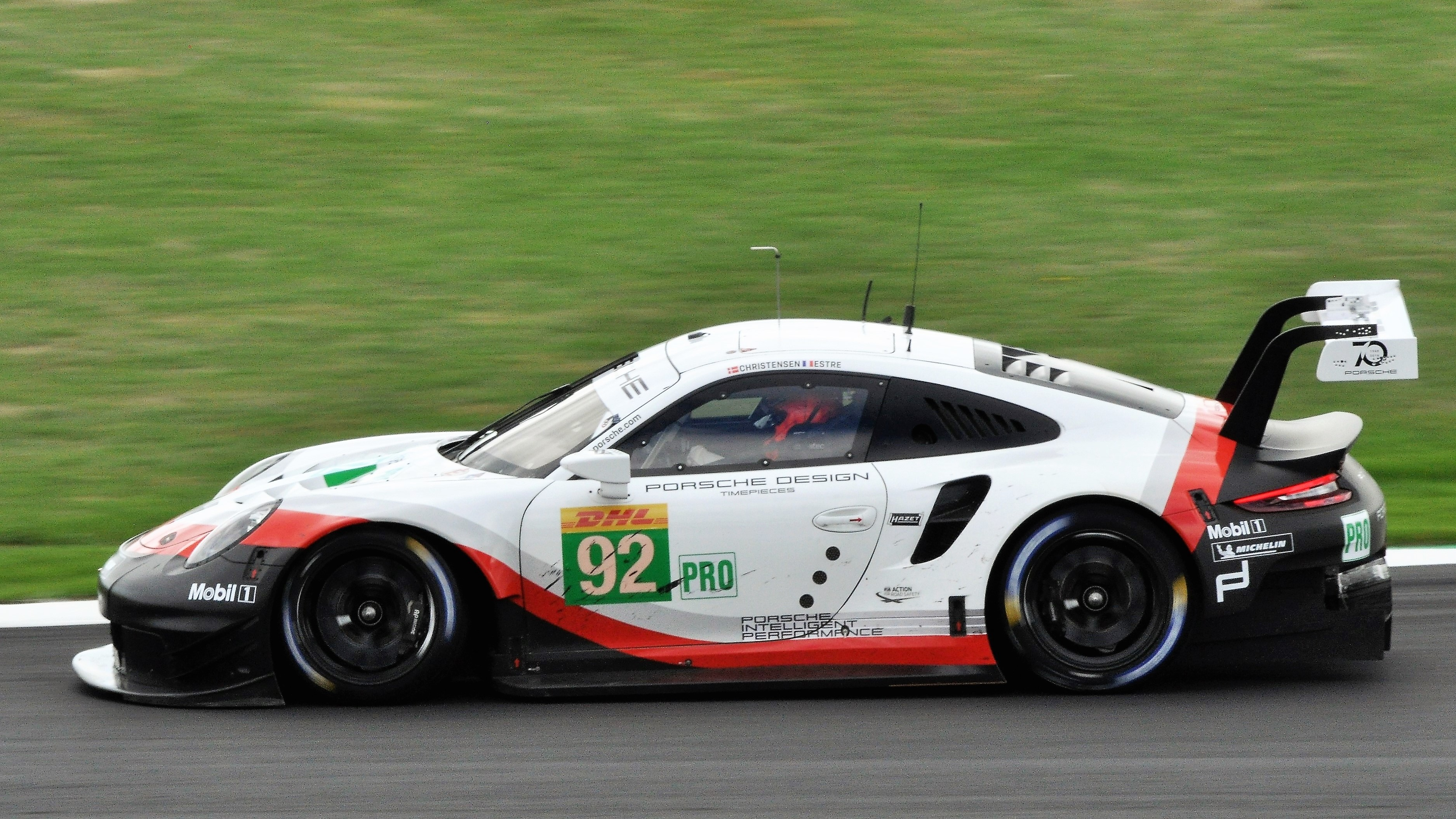
Porsche won their first World GT Manufacturers' Championship with the 911 RSR in the 2018–19 season.

As with the World Endurance GT Drivers' Championship, the World Endurance Cup for GT Manufacturers was elevated to World Championship status in 2017. The championship is open to all manufacturers participating in the LMGTE categories, although only manufacturers who competed in the whole season are eligible for points. All teams from the manufacturers entered for the entire season are eligible for points. The top two finishers, regardless of category, were awarded points toward the championship.

A grey background and the † symbol denotes a season in which the World Cup for GT Manufacturers was awarded.

Winners of the World GT Manufacturers' Championship
Season	Manufacturer	Cars	Poles (Note: Includes wins, podiums, and pole positions in both LMGTE Pro and LMGTE Am)	Wins	Podiums	Points	Clinched	Margin	Ref
2012†	Ferrari (ITA)	Ferrari 458 Italia GT2	7	6	19	338	Race 6 of 8	105	
2013†	Ferrari (ITA)	Ferrari 458 Italia GT2	2	5	16	255	Race 8 of 8	8.5	
2014†	Ferrari (ITA)	Ferrari 458 Italia GT2	7	5	16	288	Race 8 of 8	28	
2015†	Porsche (DEU)	Porsche 911 RSR	1	5	16	290	Race 8 of 8	4	
2016†	Ferrari (ITA)	Ferrari 458 Italia GT2	3	3	12	294	Race 9 of 9	7	
2016†	Ferrari (ITA)	Ferrari 488 GTE	3	3	12	294	Race 9 of 9	7	
2017	Ferrari (ITA)	Ferrari 488 GTE	4	5	11	305	Race 8 of 9	67.5	
2018–19	Porsche (DEU)	Porsche 911 RSR	2	3	10	288	Race 7 of 8	94	
2019–20	Aston Martin (GBR)	Aston Martin Vantage AMR	1	4	10	332	Race 7 of 8	43	
2021	Ferrari (ITA)	Ferrari 488 GTE Evo	1	3	9	291	Race 6 of 6	14	
2022	Ferrari (ITA)	Ferrari 488 GTE Evo	1	3	9	269	Race 6 of 6	12	

== World Cups ==
=== World Cup for Hypercar Teams ===
The World Cup for Hypercar Teams was introduced in the 2023 season for privateer teams and for car manufacturers entering more than two entries in the Hypercar category to field their additional vehicles in this sub-championship.

Winners of the World Cup for Hypercar Teams
Season	Team	Cars	Tyre	Poles	Wins	Podiums	Points	Clinched	Margin	Ref
2023	Hertz Team Jota (GBR)	Porsche 963	M	0	5	5	150	Race 5 of 7	114	
2024	Hertz Team Jota (GBR)	Porsche 963	M	0	4	5	183	Race 7 of 8	30	
2025	AF Corse (ITA)	Ferrari 499P	M	0	8	8	252	Race 7 of 8	90	

== Trophies ==
=== LMP1 Private Teams Drivers' Trophy ===
The FIA Trophy for the drivers of private entries in the LMP1 category was created in 2014 to award non-manufacturer entries. It was awarded to the highest-placed LMP1 privateer squad that entered a car that did not feature hybrid technology from 2015 onward. Due to a lack of privateer LMP1 entries in 2017, the trophy was not awarded before eventually being dropped altogether.

Winners of the LMP1 Private Teams Drivers' Trophy
Season	Drivers	Team	Tyre	Poles	Wins	Podiums	Points	Clinched	Margin	Ref
2014	Mathias Beche (CHE)	Rebellion Racing (CHE)	M	0	5	8	204	Race 4 of 8	111	
2014	Nick Heidfeld (DEU)	Rebellion Racing (CHE)	M	0	5	8	204	Race 4 of 8	111	
2014	Nicolas Prost (FRA)	Rebellion Racing (CHE)	M	0	5	8	204	Race 4 of 8	111	
2015	Mathias Beche (CHE)	Rebellion Racing (CHE)	M	0	2	6	134	Race 7 of 8	26	
2015	Nicolas Prost (FRA)	Rebellion Racing (CHE)	M	0	2	6	134	Race 7 of 8	26	
2016	Alexandre Imperatori (CHE)	Rebellion Racing (CHE)	D	0	7	8	193	Race 7 of 9	84	
2016	Dominik Kraihamer (AUT)	Rebellion Racing (CHE)	D	0	7	8	193	Race 7 of 9	84	
2016	Mathéo Tuscher (CHE)	Rebellion Racing (CHE)	D	0	7	8	193	Race 7 of 9	84	

=== Endurance Trophy for LMP2 Drivers ===
The Trophy for LMP2 Drivers was awarded from 2013 to 2023 to allow LMP2 drivers their own title separate from the World Endurance Drivers' Championship.

Winners of the Endurance Trophy for LMP2 Drivers
Season	Drivers	Team	Tyre	Poles	Wins	Podiums	Points	Clinched	Margin	Ref
2013	Bertrand Baguette (BEL)	OAK Racing (FRA)	D	1	2	5	141.5	Race 8 of 8	9	
2013	Ricardo González (MEX)	OAK Racing (FRA)	D	1	2	5	141.5	Race 8 of 8	9	
2013	Martin Plowman (GBR)	OAK Racing (FRA)	D	1	2	5	141.5	Race 8 of 8	9	
2014	Sergey Zlobin (RUS)	SMP Racing (RUS)	M	0	1	6	146	Race 8 of 8	9	
2015	Sam Bird (GBR)	G-Drive Racing (RUS)	D	4	4	7	178	Race 8 of 8	23	
2015	Julien Canal (FRA)	G-Drive Racing (RUS)	D	4	4	7	178	Race 8 of 8	23	
2015	Roman Rusinov (RUS)	G-Drive Racing (RUS)	D	4	4	7	178	Race 8 of 8	23	
2016	Nicolas Lapierre (FRA)	Signatech Alpine (FRA)	D	2	4	7	199	Race 8 of 9	33	
2016	Gustavo Menezes (USA)	Signatech Alpine (FRA)	D	2	4	7	199	Race 8 of 9	33	
2016	Stéphane Richelmi (MON)	Signatech Alpine (FRA)	D	2	4	7	199	Race 8 of 9	33	
2017	Julien Canal (FRA)	Vaillante Rebellion (CHE)	D	1	4	8	186	Race 9 of 9	11	
2017	Bruno Senna (BRA)	Vaillante Rebellion (CHE)	D	1	4	8	186	Race 9 of 9	11	
2018–19	Nicolas Lapierre (FRA)	Signatech Alpine Matmut (FRA)	D M	1	2	8	181	Race 8 of 8	15	
2018–19	André Negrão (BRA)	Signatech Alpine Matmut (FRA)	D M	1	2	8	181	Race 8 of 8	15	
2018–19	Pierre Thiriet (FRA)	Signatech Alpine Matmut (FRA)	D M	1	2	8	181	Race 8 of 8	15	
2019–20	Filipe Albuquerque (PRT)	United Autosports (GBR)	M	5	4	6	190	Race 7 of 8	15	
2019–20	Phil Hanson (GBR)	United Autosports (GBR)	M	5	4	6	190	Race 7 of 8	15	
2021	Robin Frijns (NLD)	Team WRT (BEL)	G	1	3	4	151	Race 6 of 6	20	
2021	Ferdinand von Habsburg (AUT)	Team WRT (BEL)	G	1	3	4	151	Race 6 of 6	20	
2021	Charles Milesi (FRA)	Team WRT (BEL)	G	1	3	4	151	Race 6 of 6	20	
2022	António Félix da Costa (PRT)	Jota (GBR)	G	1	1	5	137	Race 6 of 6	21	
2022	Roberto González (MEX)	Jota (GBR)	G	1	1	5	137	Race 6 of 6	21	
2022	Will Stevens (GBR)	Jota (GBR)	G	1	1	5	137	Race 6 of 6	21	
2023	Rui Andrade (ANG)	Team WRT (BEL)	G	1	3	6	173	Race 7 of 7	59	
2023	Louis Delétraz (CHE)	Team WRT (BEL)	G	1	3	6	173	Race 7 of 7	59	
2023	Robert Kubica (POL)	Team WRT (BEL)	G	1	3	6	173	Race 7 of 7	59	

=== Endurance Trophy for LMP2 Pro/Am Drivers ===
The Trophy for LMP2 Pro/Am Drivers was introduced in the 2021 season for LMP2 driver crews featuring at least one bronze-rated driver (gentleman driver). It was discontinued from the 2023 season after responding to team consultation and market demands.

Winners of the Endurance Trophy for LMP2 Pro/Am Drivers
Season	Drivers	Team	Tyre	Poles (Note: Pole positions were not awarded in LMP2 Pro/Am. A single point was awarded for the entire LMP2 category.)	Wins	Podiums	Points	Clinched	Margin	Ref
2021	Frits van Eerd (NLD)	Racing Team Nederland (NLD)	G	0	4	5	167	Race 6 of 6	21	
2022	Nicklas Nielsen (DNK)	AF Corse (ITA)	G	0	4	6	178	Race 6 of 6	24	
2022	François Perrodo (FRA)	AF Corse (ITA)	G	0	4	6	178	Race 6 of 6	24	
2022	Alessio Rovera (ITA)	AF Corse (ITA)	G	0	4	6	178	Race 6 of 6	24	

=== Endurance Trophy for LMGTE Am Drivers ===
The Trophy for LMGTE Am Drivers was an additional title separate from the World Cup for GT Drivers, only open to drivers in LMGTE Am.

Winners of the Endurance Trophy for LMGTE Am Drivers
Season	Drivers	Team	Tyre	Poles	Wins	Podiums	Points	Clinched	Margin	Ref
2013	Jamie Campbell-Walter (GBR)	Aston Martin Racing (GBR)	M	1	2	4	129	Race 8 of 8	1	
2013	Stuart Hall (GBR)	Aston Martin Racing (GBR)	M	1	2	4	129	Race 8 of 8	1	
2014	David Heinemeier Hansson (DNK)	Aston Martin Racing (GBR)	M	1	4	8	198	Race 7 of 8	34	
2014	Kristian Poulsen (DNK)	Aston Martin Racing (GBR)	M	1	4	8	198	Race 7 of 8	34	
2015	Aleksey Basov (RUS)	SMP Racing (RUS)	M	2	3	6	165	Race 8 of 8	17	
2015	Andrea Bertolini (ITA)	SMP Racing (RUS)	M	2	3	6	165	Race 8 of 8	17	
2015	Viktor Shaytar (RUS)	SMP Racing (RUS)	M	2	3	6	165	Race 8 of 8	17	
2016	Rui Águas (PRT)	AF Corse (ITA)	M	0	2	8	188	Race 9 of 9	37	
2016	Emmanuel Collard (FRA)	AF Corse (ITA)	M	0	2	8	188	Race 9 of 9	37	
2016	François Perrodo (FRA)	AF Corse (ITA)	M	0	2	8	188	Race 9 of 9	37	
2017	Paul Dalla Lana (CAN)	Aston Martin Racing (GBR)	D	7	4	7	192	Race 9 of 9	24	
2017	Pedro Lamy (PRT)	Aston Martin Racing (GBR)	D	7	4	7	192	Race 9 of 9	24	
2017	Mathias Lauda (AUT)	Aston Martin Racing (GBR)	D	7	4	7	192	Race 9 of 9	24	
2018–19	Jörg Bergmeister (DEU)	Team Project 1 (DEU)	M	1	2	6	151	Race 8 of 8	41	
2018–19	Patrick Lindsey (USA)	Team Project 1 (DEU)	M	1	2	6	151	Race 8 of 8	41	
2018–19	Egidio Perfetti (NOR)	Team Project 1 (DEU)	M	1	2	6	151	Race 8 of 8	41	
2019–20	Emmanuel Collard (FRA)	AF Corse (ITA)	M	0	2	4	167	Race 8 of 8	13	
2019–20	Nicklas Nielsen (DNK)	AF Corse (ITA)	M	0	2	4	167	Race 8 of 8	13	
2019–20	François Perrodo (FRA)	AF Corse (ITA)	M	0	2	4	167	Race 8 of 8	13	
2021	Nicklas Nielsen (DNK)	AF Corse (ITA)	M	0	4	4	150	Race 6 of 6	59.5	
2021	François Perrodo (FRA)	AF Corse (ITA)	M	0	4	4	150	Race 6 of 6	59.5	
2021	Alessio Rovera (ITA)	AF Corse (ITA)	M	0	4	4	150	Race 6 of 6	59.5	
2022	Ben Keating (USA)	TF Sport (GBR)	M	3	2	4	141	Race 6 of 6	23	
2022	Marco Sørensen (DNK)	TF Sport (GBR)	M	3	2	4	141	Race 6 of 6	23	
2023	Nicky Catsburg (NLD)	Corvette Racing (USA)	M	3	3	5	173	Race 5 of 7	55	
2023	Ben Keating (USA)	Corvette Racing (USA)	M	3	3	5	173	Race 5 of 7	55	
2023	Nicolás Varrone (ARG)	Corvette Racing (USA)	M	3	3	5	173	Race 5 of 7	55	

=== Endurance Trophy for LMGT3 Drivers ===
The Trophy for LMGT3 Drivers was introduced in the 2024 season for LMGT3 driver crews featuring at least one bronze-rated driver (gentleman driver).

Winners of the Endurance Trophy for LMGT3 Drivers
Season	Drivers	Team	Tyre	Poles	Wins	Podiums	Points	Clinched	Margin	Ref
2024	Klaus Bachler (AUT)	Manthey PureRxcing (LTU)	G	2	2	6	139	Race 7 of 8	34	
2024	Alex Malykhin (KNA) (Note: Malykhin is Belarusian, but he competes under a Kittitian licence as Belarusian national emblems were banned by the Fédération Internationale de l'Automobile following the Russian invasion of Ukraine.)	Manthey PureRxcing (LTU)	G	2	2	6	139	Race 7 of 8	34	
2024	Joel Sturm (DEU)	Manthey PureRxcing (LTU)	G	2	2	6	139	Race 7 of 8	34	
2025	Ryan Hardwick (USA)	Manthey 1st Phorm (DEU)	G	0	2	2	123	Race 8 of 8	14	
2025	Richard Lietz (AUT)	Manthey 1st Phorm (DEU)	G	0	2	2	123	Race 8 of 8	14	
2025	Riccardo Pera (ITA)	Manthey 1st Phorm (DEU)	G	0	2	2	123	Race 8 of 8	14	
2026	Jonny Edgar (GBR)	TF Sport (GBR)	G	0	1	3	107	Race 8 of 8	4	

=== Endurance Trophy for Private LMP1 Teams ===
A teams title was not held for manufacturers in the LMP1 category, instead a Trophy was awarded to privately entered LMP1 teams. Note that points in this Trophy were awarded solely on the finishing position of private LMP1 entries, with manufacturer entries not included. Although teams may have earned points for a win in the Trophy, they did not score a win in the overall LMP1 standings. Due to a lack of privateer LMP1 entries in 2017, the trophy was not awarded before being dropped altogether.

Winners of the Endurance Trophy for Private LMP1 Teams
Season	Team	Cars	Tyre	Poles	Wins	Podiums	Points	Clinched	Margin	Ref
2012	Rebellion Racing (CHE)	Lola B11/60-Toyota	M	0	6	12	205	Race 7 of 8	57	
2012	Rebellion Racing (CHE)	Lola B12/60-Toyota	M	0	6	12	205	Race 7 of 8	57	
2013	Rebellion Racing (CHE)	Lola B12/60-Toyota	M	0	6	7	173.5	Race 6 of 8	105.5	
2014	Rebellion Racing (CHE)	Lola B12/60-Toyota	M	0 (Note: Pole positions were not awarded in the LMP1-L category. A single pole position point was awarded for the entire LMP1 category.)	5	8	204	Race 4 of 8	111	
2014	Rebellion Racing (CHE)	Rebellion R-One-Toyota	M	0	5	8	204	Race 4 of 8	111	
2015	Rebellion Racing (CHE)	Rebellion R-One-AER	M	0	2	6	134	Race 7 of 8	26	
2016	Rebellion Racing (CHE)	Rebellion R-One-AER	D	0	7	8	193	Race 7 of 9	84	

=== Endurance Trophy for LMP2 Teams ===
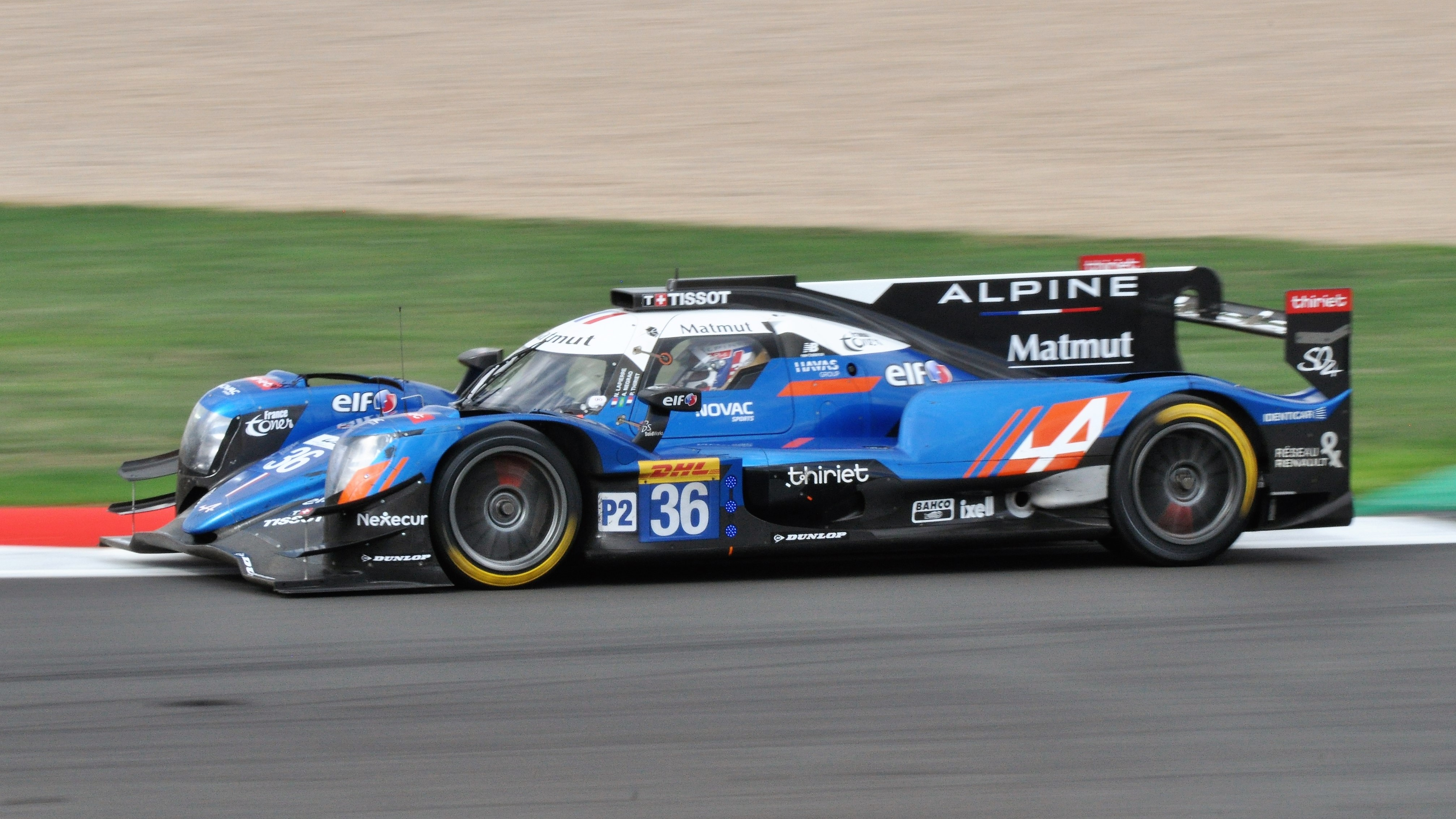
Signatech Alpine earned their second LMP2 teams trophy in the 2018–19 season.

For the 2012 season, multi-car teams were awarded points based on their highest finishing entry. From 2013 to 2023, each entry was scored as its own team.

Winners of the Endurance Trophy for LMP2 Teams
Season	Team	Cars	Tyre	Poles	Wins	Podiums	Points	Clinched	Margin	Ref
2012	Starworks Motorsport (USA)	HPD ARX-03b	D	4	3	7	177	Race 7 of 8	23	
2013	OAK Racing (FRA)	Morgan LMP2-Nissan	D	1	2	5	141.5	Race 8 of 8	7	
2014	SMP Racing (RUS)	Oreca 03-Nissan	M	0	1	6	146	Race 8 of 8	9	
2014	SMP Racing (RUS)	Oreca 03R-Nissan	M	0	1	6	146	Race 8 of 8	9	
2015	G-Drive Racing (RUS)	Ligier JS P2-Nissan	D	4	4	7	178	Race 8 of 8	23	
2016	Signatech Alpine (FRA)	Alpine A460-Nissan	D	2	4	7	199	Race 8 of 9	30	
2017	Vaillante Rebellion (CHE)	Oreca 07-Gibson	D	1	4	8	186	Race 9 of 9	11	
2018–19	Signatech Alpine Matmut (FRA)	Alpine A470-Gibson	D M	1	2	8	181	Race 8 of 8	15	
2019–20	United Autosports (GBR)	Oreca 07-Gibson	M	5	4	6	190	Race 7 of 8	38	
2021	Team WRT (BEL)	Oreca 07-Gibson	G	1	3	4	151	Race 6 of 6	20	
2022	Jota (GBR)	Oreca 07-Gibson	G	1	1	4	137	Race 6 of 6	21	
2023	Team WRT (BEL)	Oreca 07-Gibson	G	1	3	6	173	Race 7 of 7	59	

=== Endurance Trophy for LMP2 Pro/Am Teams ===
The Trophy for LMP2 Pro/Am Teams was introduced in the 2021 season for LMP2 teams featuring at least one bronze-rated driver (gentleman driver) in their lineup. It was discontinued from the 2023 season after responding to team consultation and market demands.

Winners of the Endurance Trophy for LMP2 Pro/Am Teams
Season	Team	Cars	Tyre	Poles	Wins	Podiums	Points	Clinched	Margin	Ref
2021	Racing Team Nederland (NLD)	Oreca 07-Gibson	G	0	4	5	167	Race 6 of 6	21	
2022	AF Corse (ITA)	Oreca 07-Gibson	G	0	4	6	178	Race 6 of 6	24	

=== Endurance Trophy for LMGTE Pro Teams ===
For the 2012 season, multi-car teams were awarded points based on their highest finishing entry. From 2013 onward, each entry was scored as its own team. The Endurance Trophy for LMGTE Pro Teams was dropped for the 2018–19 season.

Winners of the Endurance Trophy for LMGTE Pro Teams
Season	Team	Cars	Tyre	Poles	Wins	Podiums	Points	Clinched	Margin	Ref
2012	AF Corse (ITA)	Ferrari 458 Italia GT2	M	0	5	8	201	Race 6 of 8	59	
2013	AF Corse (ITA)	Ferrari 458 Italia GT2	M	1	3	5	145	Race 8 of 8	16.5	
2014	AF Corse (ITA)	Ferrari 458 Italia GT2	M	4	4	5	168	Race 7 of 8	20	
2015	Porsche Team Manthey (DEU)	Porsche 911 RSR	M	0	3	5	154	Race 8 of 8	5	
2016	Aston Martin Racing (GBR)	Aston Martin Vantage GTE	D	3	2	6	156	Race 9 of 9	15	
2017	AF Corse (ITA)	Ferrari 488 GTE	M	0	3	7	164	Race 9 of 9	18	

=== Endurance Trophy for LMGTE Am Teams ===
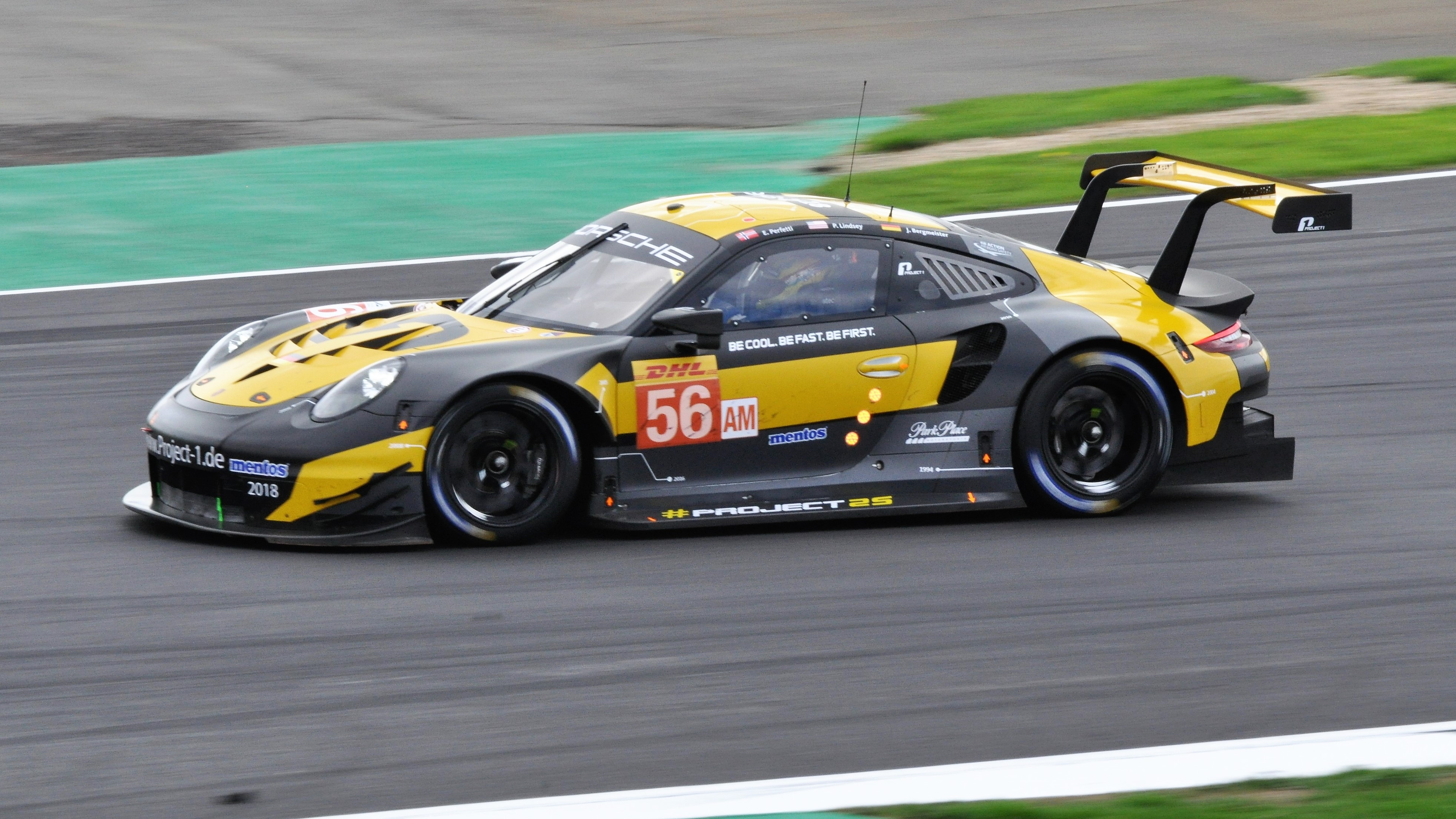
2018–19 LMGTE Am champions Team Project 1

For the 2012 season, multi-car teams were awarded points based on their highest finishing entry. From 2013 to 2023, each entry was scored as its own team.

Winners of the Endurance Trophy for LMGTE Am Teams
Season	Team	Cars	Tyre	Poles	Wins	Podiums	Points	Clinched	Margin	Ref
2012	Larbre Compétition (FRA)	Chevrolet Corvette C6.R	M	1	3	8	179	Race 8 of 8	26	
2013	8 Star Motorsports (USA)	Ferrari 458 Italia GT2	M	1	2	5	136	Race 8 of 8	3	
2014	Aston Martin Racing (GBR)	Aston Martin Vantage GTE	M	1	4	8	198	Race 7 of 8	34	
2015	SMP Racing (RUS)	Ferrari 458 Italia GT2	M	2	3	6	165	Race 8 of 8	17	
2016	AF Corse (ITA)	Ferrari 458 Italia GT2	M	0	2	8	188	Race 9 of 9	37	
2017	Aston Martin Racing (GBR)	Aston Martin Vantage GTE	D	7	4	8	198	Race 9 of 9	19	
2018–19	Team Project 1 (DEU)	Porsche 911 RSR	M	1	2	6	151	Race 8 of 8	41	
2019–20	AF Corse (ITA)	Ferrari 488 GTE Evo	M	0	2	4	167	Race 8 of 8	13	
2021	AF Corse (ITA)	Ferrari 488 GTE Evo	M	0	4	4	150	Race 6 of 6	59.5	
2022	TF Sport (GBR)	Aston Martin Vantage AMR	M	3	1	4	141	Race 6 of 6	23	
2023	Corvette Racing (USA)	Chevrolet Corvette C8.R	M	3	3	5	173	Race 5 of 7	55	

=== Endurance Trophy for LMGT3 Teams ===
Each entry is scored as its own team in the Endurance Trophy for LMGT3 Teams championship since its introduction in 2024.

Winners of the Endurance Trophy for LMGT3 Teams
Season	Team	Cars	Tyre	Poles	Wins	Podiums	Points	Clinched	Margin	Ref
2024	Manthey PureRxcing (LTU)	Porsche 911 GT3 R (992)	G	2	2	6	139	Race 7 of 8	34	
2025	Manthey 1st Phorm (DEU)	Porsche 911 GT3 R (992)	G	0	2	2	123	Race 8 of 8	14	
2026	TF Sport (GBR)	Chevrolet Corvette Z06 GT3.R	G	0	1	3	107	Race 8 of 8	8	

== Michelin Green X Challenge ==
The Michelin Green X Challenge was a championship based on the energy efficiency and performance of each full-time WEC team over the course of the 2012 season. It was divided into the LMP and LMGTE categories and each champion received an automatic entry to the 2013 24 Hours of Le Mans.

Winners of the Michelin Green X Challenge
Season	Category	No.	Team	Wins	Points	Margin	Clinched	Ref
2012	LMP	2	Audi Sport Team Joest (DEU)	7	318	17	Race 8 of 8	
2012	LMGTE	71	AF Corse (ITA)	2	216	18	Race 8 of 8	
