= 2021 FIA World Endurance Championship =

Auto racing series

- Organizer: Fédération Internationale de l'Automobile; Automobile Club de l'Ouest
- Discipline: Sports car endurance racing
- Races: 6

Champions
- Hypercar Team: (Japan) Toyota Gazoo Racing
- GTE Manufacturer: (Italy) Ferrari
- LMP2 Team: (Belgium) Team WRT
- LMP2 Pro-Am Team: (Netherlands) Racing Team Nederland
- LMGTE Am Team: (Italy) AF Corse

FIA World Endurance Championship
- ← 2019–20 2022 →

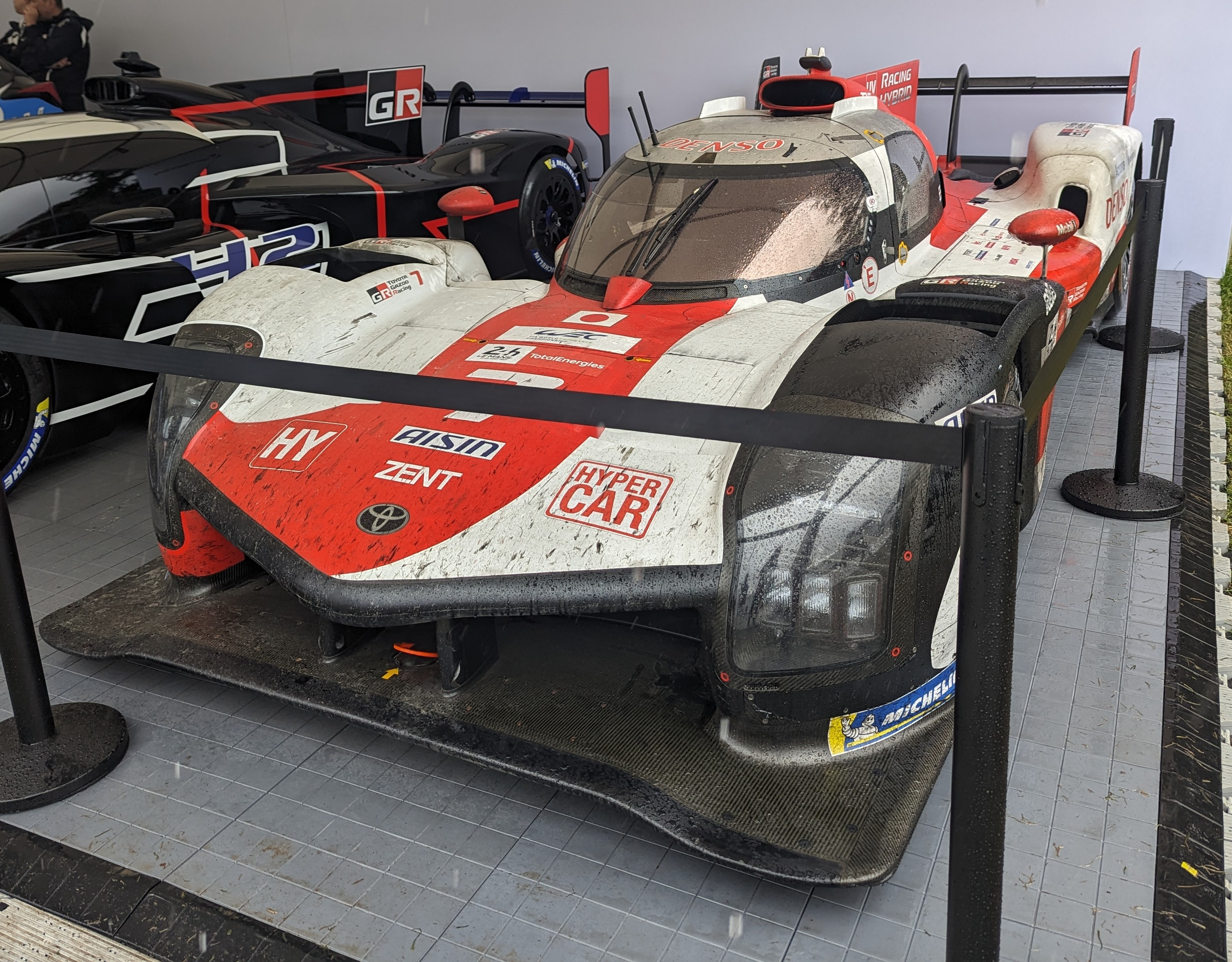
The No. 7 Toyota Gazoo Racing won the inaugural Hypercar Drivers' Championship, with Toyota winning the Hypercar Manufacturers' Championship.

The 2021 FIA World Endurance Championship was the ninth season of the FIA World Endurance Championship, an auto racing series organised by the Fédération Internationale de l'Automobile (FIA) and the Automobile Club de l'Ouest (ACO). The series is open to prototype and grand tourer-style racing cars divided into four categories. World Championship titles were awarded to the leading manufacturers and drivers in both the prototype and grand tourer divisions.

The 2021 championship was due to see a significant overhaul of the technical regulations in the top class of competition. The LMP1 Prototypes used in the top class for the first eight years of the championship had been phased out and replaced by a new prototype specification known as Le Mans Hypercars (LMH). However, non-hybrid LMP1 cars were permitted to be "grandfathered" into the season.

The 2021 championship also marked the return to an annual calendar for the World Endurance Championship, switching back to a summer calendar after the late running of the previous season due to the COVID-19 pandemic.

== Calendar ==
A calendar was revealed in December 2019 at the 8 Hours of Bahrain. Due to the COVID-19 pandemic, the previous season was extended into November 2020. However, the 2021 season returned to an annual calendar entirely instead of a winter calendar. A calendar for the 2021 season was announced during the 2020 24 Hours of Le Mans event. The calendar featured six rounds as opposed to eight and saw the removal of the 6 Hours of Silverstone, 6 Hours of Shanghai and Lone Star Le Mans when compared with the 2019–20 calendar as well as the addition of the 6 Hours of Monza. The decision to run a six-round series was made to save on costs due to the financial impact of the pandemic. The 1000 Miles of Sebring was initially scheduled for 19 March 2021 as the first round of the season, but was cancelled in response to the COVID-19 pandemic and replaced by a race of the same length at Portimão on 4 April 2021. That same race would also be itself later postponed to 13 June, making Spa the site of the preseason Prologue and the first race of the season. The 24 Hours of Le Mans was originally scheduled to be run on the 12 and 13 June but was later postponed until 21–22 August for an increased chance of running the race with spectators. The 6 Hours of Fuji was cancelled due to ongoing travel restrictions in Japan, and was replaced by a 6-hour event in Bahrain.

Rnd	Race	Circuit	Location	Date
	Prologue	Circuit de Spa-Francorchamps	(Belgium) Stavelot	26/27 April
1	Total 6 Hours of Spa-Francorchamps	Circuit de Spa-Francorchamps	(Belgium) Stavelot	1 May
2	8 Hours of Portimão	Algarve International Circuit	(Portugal) Portimão	13 June (Note: The 8 Hours of Portimão was originally due to take place on 4 April 2021. It was postponed to 13 June in response to the COVID-19 pandemic.)
3	6 Hours of Monza	Autodromo Nazionale di Monza	(Italy) Monza	18 July
4	89th 24 Hours of Le Mans	Circuit de la Sarthe	(France) Le Mans	21–22 August (Note: The 2021 24 Hours of Le Mans was originally due to take place on 12–13 June 2021. It was postponed to 21–22 August for an increased chance of running the race with spectators.)
5	Bapco 6 Hours of Bahrain	Bahrain International Circuit	(Bahrain) Sakhir	30 October
6	Bapco 8 Hours of Bahrain	Bahrain International Circuit	(Bahrain) Sakhir	6 November (Note: The 8 Hours of Bahrain was originally scheduled for 20 November but was brought forward to 6 November to form a double-header, filling the spot left by the cancellation of the 6 Hours of Fuji.)
Cancelled due to the COVID-19 pandemic
Race		Circuit	Location	Original Date
1000 Miles of Sebring		Sebring International Raceway	(United States) Sebring, Florida	19 March
6 Hours of Fuji		Fuji Speedway	(Japan) Oyama, Shizuoka	26 September

== Regulation changes ==
The championship introduced the Le Mans Hypercar category as a replacement for the Le Mans Prototype 1 class. Manufacturers are free to build and enter bespoke designs without homologation requirement or cars based on existing road-going models subject to a homologation requirement of building at least twenty road-legal models over a two-year period. The cars have a minimum weight of 1,030 kg (2,270 lb), and power output is capped at 680 hp (510 kW) in order to achieve a benchmark lap time of three minutes and thirty seconds at the Circuit de la Sarthe. Hybrid energy-recovery systems are allowed on the front axle only, and cars can derive up to 272 hp (203 kW) of their total power output from those systems. A Balance of Performance system modelled on the system used by the GTE class is applied to ensure parity between hybrid and non-hybrid models. Manufacturers are given greater freedoms in designing the bodywork of Hypercars compared to Le Mans Prototypes provided that bodywork styling does not affect safety standards. LMP2 cars received a power decrease of 40 horsepower, to 560 horsepower, in order to maintain the performance gap between the new top class and LMP2. A specification tyre was introduced in LMP2, produced by Goodyear, ending the tyre war between Goodyear and Michelin.

== Entries ==
Toyota announced plans to enter the championship under the Hypercar regulations with a bespoke car based on the GR Super Sport Concept. Toyota launched their GR010 Hybrid on 15 January 2021. In June 2020, boutique car manufacturer Scuderia Cameron Glickenhaus committed to a two-car effort with the SCG 007 LMH, in partnership with 1989 24 Hours of Le Mans winners Sauber Motorsport, 15-time Le Mans winners Joest Racing, and engine specialists Pipo Moteurs. At the 2020 24 Hours of Le Mans, LMP1 competitors ByKolles Racing Team committed to a hypercar programme with its own car, the PMC Project LMH, but the team were not present on the entry list announced ahead of the 2021 season. Aston Martin initially planned to enter a car based on the Valkyrie road-going model. However, the British manufacturer later decided to put its Le Mans Hypercar program on hold. Long-time LMP1 privateer team Rebellion Racing will end its racing operations at the end of the 2019–20 season, despite having previously announced the joint development of a Hypercar with Peugeot. Peugeot itself has announce plans to compete from 2022 onwards, and announced Ligier Automotive as a partner in its project. Alpine announced that it will enter the championship using a single rebadged Rebellion R13 LMP1, run by Signatech Alpine. In LMGTE Pro, Aston Martin Racing ended its factory GTE Pro program run by Prodrive to focus on their Formula One team and their LMGTE Am program.

=== Hypercar ===
Entrant	Car	Engine	Hybrid	Tyre	No.	Drivers	Rounds
(Japan) Toyota Gazoo Racing	Toyota GR010 Hybrid	Toyota H8909 3.5 L Turbo V6	Hybrid	M	7	(United Kingdom) Mike Conway	All
(Japan) Toyota Gazoo Racing	Toyota GR010 Hybrid	Toyota H8909 3.5 L Turbo V6	Hybrid	M	7	(Japan) Kamui Kobayashi	All
(Japan) Toyota Gazoo Racing	Toyota GR010 Hybrid	Toyota H8909 3.5 L Turbo V6	Hybrid	M	7	(Argentina) José María López	All
(Japan) Toyota Gazoo Racing	Toyota GR010 Hybrid	Toyota H8909 3.5 L Turbo V6	Hybrid	M	8	(Switzerland) Sébastien Buemi	All
(Japan) Toyota Gazoo Racing	Toyota GR010 Hybrid	Toyota H8909 3.5 L Turbo V6	Hybrid	M	8	(New Zealand) Brendon Hartley	All
(Japan) Toyota Gazoo Racing	Toyota GR010 Hybrid	Toyota H8909 3.5 L Turbo V6	Hybrid	M	8	(Japan) Kazuki Nakajima	All
(France) Alpine Elf Matmut	Alpine A480	Gibson GL458 4.5 L V8		M	36	(France) Nicolas Lapierre	All
(France) Alpine Elf Matmut	Alpine A480	Gibson GL458 4.5 L V8		M	36	(Brazil) André Negrão	All
(France) Alpine Elf Matmut	Alpine A480	Gibson GL458 4.5 L V8		M	36	(France) Matthieu Vaxivière	All
(United States) Glickenhaus Racing	Glickenhaus SCG 007 LMH	Glickenhaus P21 3.5 L Turbo V8		M	708	(Brazil) Pipo Derani	3–4
(United States) Glickenhaus Racing	Glickenhaus SCG 007 LMH	Glickenhaus P21 3.5 L Turbo V8		M	708	(France) Olivier Pla	3–4
(United States) Glickenhaus Racing	Glickenhaus SCG 007 LMH	Glickenhaus P21 3.5 L Turbo V8		M	708	(United States) Gustavo Menezes	3
(United States) Glickenhaus Racing	Glickenhaus SCG 007 LMH	Glickenhaus P21 3.5 L Turbo V8		M	708	(France) Franck Mailleux	4
(United States) Glickenhaus Racing	Glickenhaus SCG 007 LMH	Glickenhaus P21 3.5 L Turbo V8		M	709	(France) Romain Dumas	2–4
(United States) Glickenhaus Racing	Glickenhaus SCG 007 LMH	Glickenhaus P21 3.5 L Turbo V8		M	709	(United Kingdom) Richard Westbrook	2–4
(United States) Glickenhaus Racing	Glickenhaus SCG 007 LMH	Glickenhaus P21 3.5 L Turbo V8		M	709	(Australia) Ryan Briscoe	2, 4
(United States) Glickenhaus Racing	Glickenhaus SCG 007 LMH	Glickenhaus P21 3.5 L Turbo V8		M	709	(France) Franck Mailleux	3

=== LMP2 ===
In accordance with the 2017 LMP2 regulations, all cars in the LMP2 class will use the Gibson GK428 V8 engine. Entries in the LMP2 Pro-Am Cup, set aside for teams with a Bronze-rated driver in their line-up, are denoted with Icons.

Entrant	Car	No.	Tyre	MISC	Drivers	Rounds
(France) Richard Mille Racing Team	Oreca 07	1	G	P2	(Germany) Sophia Flörsch	All
(France) Richard Mille Racing Team	Oreca 07	1	G	P2	(Colombia) Tatiana Calderón	1–4, 6
(France) Richard Mille Racing Team	Oreca 07	1	G	P2	(Netherlands) Beitske Visser	1–2, 4–6
(France) Richard Mille Racing Team	Oreca 07	1	G	P2	(France) Gabriel Aubry	5
(Denmark) High Class Racing	Oreca 07	20	G	PA	(Denmark) Dennis Andersen	All
(Denmark) High Class Racing	Oreca 07	20	G	PA	(Denmark) Anders Fjordbach	1–3, 5–6
(Denmark) High Class Racing	Oreca 07	20	G	PA	(Denmark) Jan Magnussen	1–3
(Denmark) High Class Racing	Oreca 07	20	G	PA	(Denmark) Marco Sørensen	4
(Denmark) High Class Racing	Oreca 07	20	G	PA	(United States) Ricky Taylor	4
(Denmark) High Class Racing	Oreca 07	20	G	PA	(Poland) Robert Kubica	5–6
(United States) DragonSpeed USA	Oreca 07	21	G	PA	(United Kingdom) Ben Hanley	All
(United States) DragonSpeed USA	Oreca 07	21	G	PA	(Sweden) Henrik Hedman	All
(United States) DragonSpeed USA	Oreca 07	21	G	PA	(Colombia) Juan Pablo Montoya	All
(United States) United Autosports USA	Oreca 07	22	G	P2	(United Kingdom) Phil Hanson	All
(United States) United Autosports USA	Oreca 07	22	G	P2	(Switzerland) Fabio Scherer	1, 3–6
(United States) United Autosports USA	Oreca 07	22	G	P2	(Portugal) Filipe Albuquerque	1, 3–6
(United States) United Autosports USA	Oreca 07	22	G	P2	(United Kingdom) Paul di Resta	2
(United States) United Autosports USA	Oreca 07	22	G	P2	(United Kingdom) Wayne Boyd	2
(United Kingdom) Jota	Oreca 07	28	G	P2	(United Kingdom) Tom Blomqvist	All
(United Kingdom) Jota	Oreca 07	28	G	P2	(Indonesia) Sean Gelael	All
(United Kingdom) Jota	Oreca 07	28	G	P2	(Belgium) Stoffel Vandoorne	All
(United Kingdom) Jota	Oreca 07	38	G	P2	(United Kingdom) Anthony Davidson	All
(United Kingdom) Jota	Oreca 07	38	G	P2	(Portugal) António Félix da Costa	All
(United Kingdom) Jota	Oreca 07	38	G	P2	(Mexico) Roberto González	All
(Netherlands) Racing Team Nederland	Oreca 07	29	G	PA	(Netherlands) Frits van Eerd	All
(Netherlands) Racing Team Nederland	Oreca 07	29	G	PA	(Netherlands) Giedo van der Garde	1–2, 4–6
(Netherlands) Racing Team Nederland	Oreca 07	29	G	PA	(Netherlands) Job van Uitert	1–2, 4–6
(Netherlands) Racing Team Nederland	Oreca 07	29	G	PA	(Netherlands) Nyck de Vries	3
(Netherlands) Racing Team Nederland	Oreca 07	29	G	PA	(France) Paul-Loup Chatin	3
(Belgium) Team WRT	Oreca 07	31	G	P2	(Netherlands) Robin Frijns	All
(Belgium) Team WRT	Oreca 07	31	G	P2	(Austria) Ferdinand Habsburg	All
(Belgium) Team WRT	Oreca 07	31	G	P2	(France) Charles Milesi	All
(Poland) Inter Europol Competition	Oreca 07	34	G	P2	(United Kingdom) Alex Brundle	All
(Poland) Inter Europol Competition	Oreca 07	34	G	P2	(Poland) Jakub Śmiechowski	All
(Poland) Inter Europol Competition	Oreca 07	34	G	P2	(Netherlands) Renger van der Zande	1, 3–6
(Poland) Inter Europol Competition	Oreca 07	34	G	P2	(Switzerland) Louis Delétraz	2
(Slovakia) ARC Bratislava	Ligier JS P217 1–3; Oreca 07 4–6	44	G	PA	(Slovakia) Miroslav Konôpka	All
(Slovakia) ARC Bratislava	Ligier JS P217 1–3; Oreca 07 4–6	44	G	PA	(United Kingdom) Tom Jackson	1–2
(Slovakia) ARC Bratislava	Ligier JS P217 1–3; Oreca 07 4–6	44	G	PA	(United Kingdom) Darren Burke	1
(Slovakia) ARC Bratislava	Ligier JS P217 1–3; Oreca 07 4–6	44	G	PA	(United Kingdom) Oliver Webb	2–5
(Slovakia) ARC Bratislava	Ligier JS P217 1–3; Oreca 07 4–6	44	G	PA	(Slovakia) Matej Konôpka	3–4
(Slovakia) ARC Bratislava	Ligier JS P217 1–3; Oreca 07 4–6	44	G	PA	(India) Kush Maini	5
(Slovakia) ARC Bratislava	Ligier JS P217 1–3; Oreca 07 4–6	44	G	PA	(France) Nelson Panciatici	6
(Slovakia) ARC Bratislava	Ligier JS P217 1–3; Oreca 07 4–6	44	G	PA	(United Kingdom) Olli Caldwell	6
(Switzerland) Realteam Racing	Oreca 07	70	G	PA	(Switzerland) Esteban García	All
(Switzerland) Realteam Racing	Oreca 07	70	G	PA	(France) Norman Nato	All
(Switzerland) Realteam Racing	Oreca 07	70	G	PA	(France) Loïc Duval	1, 3–6
(Switzerland) Realteam Racing	Oreca 07	70	G	PA	(Switzerland) Mathias Beche	2

Icon	MISC
P2	LMP2
PA	LMP2 Pro-Am Cup

- Hélio Castroneves was scheduled to replace Inter Europol Competition's Renger van der Zande at the 1000 Miles of Sebring, but the round was cancelled.

=== LMGTE Pro ===
Entrant	Car	Engine	Tyre	No.	Drivers	Rounds
(Italy) AF Corse	Ferrari 488 GTE Evo	Ferrari F154CB 4.0 L Turbo V8	M	51	(United Kingdom) James Calado	All
(Italy) AF Corse	Ferrari 488 GTE Evo	Ferrari F154CB 4.0 L Turbo V8	M	51	(Italy) Alessandro Pier Guidi	All
(Italy) AF Corse	Ferrari 488 GTE Evo	Ferrari F154CB 4.0 L Turbo V8	M	51	(France) Côme Ledogar	4
(Italy) AF Corse	Ferrari 488 GTE Evo	Ferrari F154CB 4.0 L Turbo V8	M	52	(Spain) Miguel Molina	All
(Italy) AF Corse	Ferrari 488 GTE Evo	Ferrari F154CB 4.0 L Turbo V8	M	52	(Brazil) Daniel Serra	All
(Italy) AF Corse	Ferrari 488 GTE Evo	Ferrari F154CB 4.0 L Turbo V8	M	52	(United Kingdom) Sam Bird	4
(Germany) Porsche GT Team	Porsche 911 RSR-19	Porsche M97/80 4.2 L Flat-6	M	91	(Italy) Gianmaria Bruni	All
(Germany) Porsche GT Team	Porsche 911 RSR-19	Porsche M97/80 4.2 L Flat-6	M	91	(Austria) Richard Lietz	All
(Germany) Porsche GT Team	Porsche 911 RSR-19	Porsche M97/80 4.2 L Flat-6	M	91	(France) Frédéric Makowiecki	2, 4, 6
(Germany) Porsche GT Team	Porsche 911 RSR-19	Porsche M97/80 4.2 L Flat-6	M	92	(France) Kévin Estre	All
(Germany) Porsche GT Team	Porsche 911 RSR-19	Porsche M97/80 4.2 L Flat-6	M	92	(Switzerland) Neel Jani	All
(Germany) Porsche GT Team	Porsche 911 RSR-19	Porsche M97/80 4.2 L Flat-6	M	92	(Denmark) Michael Christensen	2, 4, 6

=== LMGTE Am ===
Entrant	Car	Engine	Tyre	No.	Drivers	Rounds
(United Kingdom) TF Sport	Aston Martin Vantage AMR	Aston Martin M177 4.0 L Turbo V8	M	33	(Brazil) Felipe Fraga	All
(United Kingdom) TF Sport	Aston Martin Vantage AMR	Aston Martin M177 4.0 L Turbo V8	M	33	(United States) Ben Keating	All
(United Kingdom) TF Sport	Aston Martin Vantage AMR	Aston Martin M177 4.0 L Turbo V8	M	33	(Luxembourg) Dylan Pereira	All
(Japan) D'station Racing	Aston Martin Vantage AMR	Aston Martin M177 4.0 L Turbo V8	M	777	(Japan) Tomonobu Fujii	All
(Japan) D'station Racing	Aston Martin Vantage AMR	Aston Martin M177 4.0 L Turbo V8	M	777	(Japan) Satoshi Hoshino	All
(Japan) D'station Racing	Aston Martin Vantage AMR	Aston Martin M177 4.0 L Turbo V8	M	777	(United Kingdom) Andrew Watson	All
(Germany) Team Project 1	Porsche 911 RSR-19	Porsche M97/80 4.2 L Flat-6	M	46	(Norway) Dennis Olsen	1, 3–4
(Germany) Team Project 1	Porsche 911 RSR-19	Porsche M97/80 4.2 L Flat-6	M	46	(Norway) Anders Buchardt	1, 3–4
(Germany) Team Project 1	Porsche 911 RSR-19	Porsche M97/80 4.2 L Flat-6	M	46	(Zimbabwe) Axcil Jefferies	1
(Germany) Team Project 1	Porsche 911 RSR-19	Porsche M97/80 4.2 L Flat-6	M	46	(United States) Maxwell Root	3
(Germany) Team Project 1	Porsche 911 RSR-19	Porsche M97/80 4.2 L Flat-6	M	46	(United States) Robby Foley	4
(Germany) Team Project 1	Porsche 911 RSR-19	Porsche M97/80 4.2 L Flat-6	M	56	(Italy) Matteo Cairoli	All
(Germany) Team Project 1	Porsche 911 RSR-19	Porsche M97/80 4.2 L Flat-6	M	56	(Norway) Egidio Perfetti	All
(Germany) Team Project 1	Porsche 911 RSR-19	Porsche M97/80 4.2 L Flat-6	M	56	(Italy) Riccardo Pera	All
(Italy) Cetilar Racing	Ferrari 488 GTE Evo	Ferrari F154CB 4.0 L Turbo V8	M	47	(Italy) Antonio Fuoco	All
(Italy) Cetilar Racing	Ferrari 488 GTE Evo	Ferrari F154CB 4.0 L Turbo V8	M	47	(Italy) Roberto Lacorte	All
(Italy) Cetilar Racing	Ferrari 488 GTE Evo	Ferrari F154CB 4.0 L Turbo V8	M	47	(Italy) Giorgio Sernagiotto	All
(Italy) AF Corse	Ferrari 488 GTE Evo	Ferrari F154CB 4.0 L Turbo V8	M	54	(Italy) Francesco Castellacci	All
(Italy) AF Corse	Ferrari 488 GTE Evo	Ferrari F154CB 4.0 L Turbo V8	M	54	(Italy) Giancarlo Fisichella	All
(Italy) AF Corse	Ferrari 488 GTE Evo	Ferrari F154CB 4.0 L Turbo V8	M	54	(Switzerland) Thomas Flohr	All
(Italy) AF Corse	Ferrari 488 GTE Evo	Ferrari F154CB 4.0 L Turbo V8	M	83	(Denmark) Nicklas Nielsen	All
(Italy) AF Corse	Ferrari 488 GTE Evo	Ferrari F154CB 4.0 L Turbo V8	M	83	(France) François Perrodo	All
(Italy) AF Corse	Ferrari 488 GTE Evo	Ferrari F154CB 4.0 L Turbo V8	M	83	(Italy) Alessio Rovera	All
(Italy) Iron Lynx	Ferrari 488 GTE Evo	Ferrari F154CB 4.0 L Turbo V8	M	60	(Italy) Claudio Schiavoni	1–4, 6
(Italy) Iron Lynx	Ferrari 488 GTE Evo	Ferrari F154CB 4.0 L Turbo V8	M	60	(Italy) Matteo Cressoni	1–3, 5–6
(Italy) Iron Lynx	Ferrari 488 GTE Evo	Ferrari F154CB 4.0 L Turbo V8	M	60	(Italy) Andrea Piccini	1–3, 5–6
(Italy) Iron Lynx	Ferrari 488 GTE Evo	Ferrari F154CB 4.0 L Turbo V8	M	60	(Italy) Raffaele Giammaria	4
(Italy) Iron Lynx	Ferrari 488 GTE Evo	Ferrari F154CB 4.0 L Turbo V8	M	60	(Italy) Paolo Ruberti	4
(Italy) Iron Lynx	Ferrari 488 GTE Evo	Ferrari F154CB 4.0 L Turbo V8	M	60	(Italy) Rino Mastronardi	5
(Italy) Iron Lynx	Ferrari 488 GTE Evo	Ferrari F154CB 4.0 L Turbo V8	M	85	(Switzerland) Rahel Frey	All
(Italy) Iron Lynx	Ferrari 488 GTE Evo	Ferrari F154CB 4.0 L Turbo V8	M	85	(Italy) Manuela Gostner	1–2
(Italy) Iron Lynx	Ferrari 488 GTE Evo	Ferrari F154CB 4.0 L Turbo V8	M	85	(United Kingdom) Katherine Legge	1, 5–6
(Italy) Iron Lynx	Ferrari 488 GTE Evo	Ferrari F154CB 4.0 L Turbo V8	M	85	(Denmark) Michelle Gatting	2–4
(Italy) Iron Lynx	Ferrari 488 GTE Evo	Ferrari F154CB 4.0 L Turbo V8	M	85	(Belgium) Sarah Bovy	3–6
(Germany) Dempsey-Proton Racing	Porsche 911 RSR-19	Porsche M97/80 4.2 L Flat-6	M	77	(Australia) Matt Campbell	All
(Germany) Dempsey-Proton Racing	Porsche 911 RSR-19	Porsche M97/80 4.2 L Flat-6	M	77	(New Zealand) Jaxon Evans	All
(Germany) Dempsey-Proton Racing	Porsche 911 RSR-19	Porsche M97/80 4.2 L Flat-6	M	77	(Germany) Christian Ried	All
(Germany) Dempsey-Proton Racing	Porsche 911 RSR-19	Porsche M97/80 4.2 L Flat-6	M	88	(Germany) Marco Seefried	1–3
(Germany) Dempsey-Proton Racing	Porsche 911 RSR-19	Porsche M97/80 4.2 L Flat-6	M	88	(Indonesia) Andrew Haryanto	1, 3
(Germany) Dempsey-Proton Racing	Porsche 911 RSR-19	Porsche M97/80 4.2 L Flat-6	M	88	(Belgium) Alessio Picariello	1, 3
(Germany) Dempsey-Proton Racing	Porsche 911 RSR-19	Porsche M97/80 4.2 L Flat-6	M	88	(France) Julien Andlauer	2, 4–6
(Germany) Dempsey-Proton Racing	Porsche 911 RSR-19	Porsche M97/80 4.2 L Flat-6	M	88	(United States) Dominique Bastien	2, 4
(Germany) Dempsey-Proton Racing	Porsche 911 RSR-19	Porsche M97/80 4.2 L Flat-6	M	88	(Germany) Lance Arnold	4
(Germany) Dempsey-Proton Racing	Porsche 911 RSR-19	Porsche M97/80 4.2 L Flat-6	M	88	(United Arab Emirates) Khaled Al Qubaisi	5–6
(Germany) Dempsey-Proton Racing	Porsche 911 RSR-19	Porsche M97/80 4.2 L Flat-6	M	88	(Belgium) Adrien De Leener	5
(Germany) Dempsey-Proton Racing	Porsche 911 RSR-19	Porsche M97/80 4.2 L Flat-6	M	88	(Zimbabwe) Axcil Jefferies	6
(United Kingdom) GR Racing	Porsche 911 RSR-19	Porsche M97/80 4.2 L Flat-6	M	86	(United Kingdom) Ben Barker	All
(United Kingdom) GR Racing	Porsche 911 RSR-19	Porsche M97/80 4.2 L Flat-6	M	86	(United Kingdom) Tom Gamble	All
(United Kingdom) GR Racing	Porsche 911 RSR-19	Porsche M97/80 4.2 L Flat-6	M	86	(United Kingdom) Michael Wainwright	All
(United Kingdom) Aston Martin Racing	Aston Martin Vantage AMR	Aston Martin M177 4.0 L Turbo V8	M	98	(Brazil) Marcos Gomes	All
(United Kingdom) Aston Martin Racing	Aston Martin Vantage AMR	Aston Martin M177 4.0 L Turbo V8	M	98	(Canada) Paul Dalla Lana	All
(United Kingdom) Aston Martin Racing	Aston Martin Vantage AMR	Aston Martin M177 4.0 L Turbo V8	M	98	(Brazil) Augusto Farfus	1–3, 5–6
(United Kingdom) Aston Martin Racing	Aston Martin Vantage AMR	Aston Martin M177 4.0 L Turbo V8	M	98	(Denmark) Nicki Thiim	4

== Results and standings ==
=== Race results ===
The highest finishing competitor entered in the World Endurance Championship is listed below. Invitational entries may have finished ahead of WEC competitors in individual races.

Rnd.	Circuit	Hypercar Winners	LMP2 Winners	LMP2 Pro-Am Winners	LMGTE Pro Winners	LMGTE Am Winners	Report
1	(Belgium) Spa-Francorchamps	(Japan) No. 8 Toyota Gazoo Racing	(United States) No. 22 United Autosports USA	(Netherlands) No. 29 Racing Team Nederland	(Germany) No. 92 Porsche GT Team	(Italy) No. 83 AF Corse	Report
1	(Belgium) Spa-Francorchamps	(Switzerland) Sébastien Buemi (New Zealand) Brendon Hartley (Japan) Kazuki Nakajima	(Portugal) Filipe Albuquerque (United Kingdom) Phil Hanson (Switzerland) Fabio Scherer	(Netherlands) Frits van Eerd (Netherlands) Giedo van der Garde (Netherlands) Job van Uitert	(France) Kévin Estre (Switzerland) Neel Jani	(Denmark) Nicklas Nielsen (France) François Perrodo (Italy) Alessio Rovera	Report
2	(Portugal) Portimão	(Japan) No. 8 Toyota Gazoo Racing	(United Kingdom) No. 38 Jota	(Switzerland) No. 70 Realteam Racing	(Italy) No. 51 AF Corse	(Italy) No. 47 Cetilar Racing	Report
2	(Portugal) Portimão	(Switzerland) Sébastien Buemi (New Zealand) Brendon Hartley (Japan) Kazuki Nakajima	(United Kingdom) Anthony Davidson (Portugal) António Félix da Costa (Mexico) Roberto González	(Switzerland) Mathias Beche (Switzerland) Esteban García (France) Norman Nato	(United Kingdom) James Calado (Italy) Alessandro Pier Guidi	(Italy) Antonio Fuoco (Italy) Roberto Lacorte (Italy) Giorgio Sernagiotto	Report
3	(Italy) Monza	(Japan) No. 7 Toyota Gazoo Racing	(United States) No. 22 United Autosports USA	(Netherlands) No. 29 Racing Team Nederland	(Germany) No. 92 Porsche GT Team	(Italy) No. 83 AF Corse	Report
3	(Italy) Monza	(United Kingdom) Mike Conway (Japan) Kamui Kobayashi (Argentina) José María López	(Portugal) Filipe Albuquerque (United Kingdom) Phil Hanson (Switzerland) Fabio Scherer	(France) Paul-Loup Chatin (Netherlands) Frits van Eerd (Netherlands) Nyck de Vries	(France) Kévin Estre (Switzerland) Neel Jani	(Denmark) Nicklas Nielsen (France) François Perrodo (Italy) Alessio Rovera	Report
4	(France) Le Mans	(Japan) No. 7 Toyota Gazoo Racing	(Belgium) No. 31 Team WRT	(United States) No. 21 DragonSpeed USA	(Italy) No. 51 AF Corse	(Italy) No. 83 AF Corse	Report
4	(France) Le Mans	(United Kingdom) Mike Conway (Japan) Kamui Kobayashi (Argentina) José María López	(Netherlands) Robin Frijns (Austria) Ferdinand von Habsburg (France) Charles Milesi	(United Kingdom) Ben Hanley (Sweden) Henrik Hedman (Colombia) Juan Pablo Montoya	(United Kingdom) James Calado (France) Côme Ledogar (Italy) Alessandro Pier Guidi	(Denmark) Nicklas Nielsen (France) François Perrodo (Italy) Alessio Rovera	Report
5	Bahrain	(Japan) No. 7 Toyota Gazoo Racing	(Belgium) No. 31 Team WRT	(Netherlands) No. 29 Racing Team Nederland	(Germany) No. 92 Porsche GT Team	(United Kingdom) No. 33 TF Sport	Report
5	Bahrain	(United Kingdom) Mike Conway (Japan) Kamui Kobayashi (Argentina) José María López	(Netherlands) Robin Frijns (Austria) Ferdinand von Habsburg (France) Charles Milesi	(Netherlands) Frits van Eerd (Netherlands) Giedo van der Garde (Netherlands) Job van Uitert	(France) Kévin Estre (Switzerland) Neel Jani	(Brazil) Felipe Fraga (United States) Ben Keating (Luxembourg) Dylan Pereira	Report
6	Bahrain	(Japan) No. 8 Toyota Gazoo Racing	(Belgium) No. 31 Team WRT	(Netherlands) No. 29 Racing Team Nederland	(Italy) No. 51 AF Corse	(Italy) No. 83 AF Corse	Report
6	Bahrain	(Switzerland) Sébastien Buemi (New Zealand) Brendon Hartley (Japan) Kazuki Nakajima	(Netherlands) Robin Frijns (Austria) Ferdinand von Habsburg (France) Charles Milesi	(Netherlands) Frits van Eerd (Netherlands) Giedo van der Garde (Netherlands) Job van Uitert	(United Kingdom) James Calado (Italy) Alessandro Pier Guidi	(Denmark) Nicklas Nielsen (France) François Perrodo (Italy) Alessio Rovera	Report

=== Drivers' championships ===
Five titles were offered to drivers, two with world championship status. The Hypercar World Endurance Drivers' Championship was reserved for Hypercar drivers while the GTE World Endurance Drivers' Championship was available for drivers in the LMGTE categories. FIA Endurance Trophies were awarded in LMP2, in LMP2 Pro/Am and in LMGTE Am.

Entries were required to complete the timed race as well as to complete 70% of the overall winning car's race distance in order to earn championship points. A single bonus point was awarded to the team and all drivers of the pole position car for each category in qualifying. Furthermore, a race must complete two laps under green flag conditions in order for championship points to be awarded.

Points systems
Duration	1st	2nd	3rd	4th	5th	6th	7th	8th	9th	10th	Other	Pole
6 Hours	25	18	15	12	10	8	6	4	2	1	0.5	1
8 Hours	38	27	23	18	15	12	9	6	3	2	1	1
24 Hours	50	36	30	24	20	16	12	8	4	2	1	1

==== Hypercar World Endurance Drivers' Championship ====
Pos.	Driver	Team	SPA (Belgium)	POR (Portugal)	MNZ (Italy)	LMS (France)	BHR (Bahrain)	BHR (Bahrain)	Points
1	(United Kingdom) Mike Conway	(Japan) Toyota Gazoo Racing	**3**	2	**1**	**1**	1	**2**	173
1	(Japan) Kamui Kobayashi	(Japan) Toyota Gazoo Racing	**3**	2	**1**	**1**	1	**2**	173
1	(Argentina) José María López	(Japan) Toyota Gazoo Racing	**3**	2	**1**	**1**	1	**2**	173
2	(Switzerland) Sébastien Buemi	(Japan) Toyota Gazoo Racing	1	1	4	2	**2**	1	168
2	(New Zealand) Brendon Hartley	(Japan) Toyota Gazoo Racing	1	1	4	2	**2**	1	168
2	(Japan) Kazuki Nakajima	(Japan) Toyota Gazoo Racing	1	1	4	2	**2**	1	168
3	(France) Nicolas Lapierre	(France) Alpine Elf Matmut	2	**3**	2	3	3	3	128
3	(Brazil) André Negrão	(France) Alpine Elf Matmut	2	**3**	2	3	3	3	128
3	(France) Matthieu Vaxivière	(France) Alpine Elf Matmut	2	**3**	2	3	3	3	128
4	(United Kingdom) Richard Westbrook	(United States) Glickenhaus Racing		4	3	5			53
4	(France) Romain Dumas	(United States) Glickenhaus Racing		4	3	5			53
5	(France) Franck Mailleux	(United States) Glickenhaus Racing			3	4			39
6	(Australia) Ryan Briscoe	(United States) Glickenhaus Racing		4		5			38
7	(Brazil) Pipo Derani	(United States) Glickenhaus Racing			Ret	4			24
7	(France) Olivier Pla	(United States) Glickenhaus Racing			Ret	4			24
8	(United States) Gustavo Menezes	(United States) Glickenhaus Racing			Ret				0
Pos.	Driver	Team	SPA (Belgium)	POR (Portugal)	MNZ (Italy)	LMS (France)	BHR (Bahrain)	BHR (Bahrain)	Points

Colour	Result
Gold	Winner
Silver	Second place
Bronze	Third place
Green	Points classification
Blue	Non-points classification
Blue	Non-classified finish (NC)
Purple	Retired, not classified (Ret)
Red	Did not qualify (DNQ)
Red	Did not pre-qualify (DNPQ)
Black	Disqualified (DSQ)
White	Did not start (DNS)
White	Withdrew (WD)
White	Race cancelled (C)
Blank	Did not practice (DNP)
Blank	Did not arrive (DNA)
Blank	Excluded (EX)

**Bold** - Pole position

==== World Endurance GTE Drivers' Championship ====
Pos.	Driver	Team	SPA (Belgium)	POR (Portugal)	MNZ (Italy)	LMS (France)	BHR (Bahrain)	BHR (Bahrain)	Points
1	(United Kingdom) James Calado	(Italy) AF Corse	2	1	2	1	3	1	177
1	(Italy) Alessandro Pier Guidi	(Italy) AF Corse	2	1	2	1	3	1	177
2	(France) Kévin Estre	(Germany) Porsche GT Team	**1**	**3**	**1**	2	**1**	**2**	166
2	(Switzerland) Neel Jani	(Germany) Porsche GT Team	**1**	**3**	**1**	2	**1**	**2**	166
3	(Italy) Gianmaria Bruni	(Germany) Porsche GT Team	4	4	3	3	2	4	111
3	(Austria) Richard Lietz	(Germany) Porsche GT Team	4	4	3	3	2	4	111
4	(Spain) Miguel Molina	(Italy) AF Corse	3	2	4	**10**	4	3	92
4	(Brazil) Daniel Serra	(Italy) AF Corse	3	2	4	**10**	4	3	92
5	(Denmark) Michael Christensen	(Germany) Porsche GT Team		**3**		2		**2**	88
6	(France) Frédéric Makowiecki	(Germany) Porsche GT Team		4		3		4	66
7	(Denmark) Nicklas Nielsen	(Italy) AF Corse	5	14	5	4	9	5	62
7	(France) François Perrodo	(Italy) AF Corse	5	14	5	4	9	5	62
7	(Italy) Alessio Rovera	(Italy) AF Corse	5	14	5	4	9	5	62
8	(France) Côme Ledogar	(Italy) AF Corse				1			50
9	(Brazil) Felipe Fraga	(United Kingdom) TF Sport	6	11	18	5	5	Ret	39.5
9	(United States) Ben Keating	(United Kingdom) TF Sport	6	11	18	5	5	Ret	39.5
9	(Luxembourg) Dylan Pereira	(United Kingdom) TF Sport	6	11	18	5	5	Ret	39.5
10	(Australia) Matt Campbell	(Germany) Dempsey-Proton Racing	Ret	Ret	9	7	6	6	34
10	(New Zealand) Jaxon Evans	(Germany) Dempsey-Proton Racing	Ret	Ret	9	7	6	6	34
10	(Germany) Christian Ried	(Germany) Dempsey-Proton Racing	Ret	Ret	9	7	6	6	34
11	(Italy) Matteo Cairoli	(Germany) Team Project 1	DNS	6	8	Ret	7	7	31
11	(Italy) Riccardo Pera	(Germany) Team Project 1	DNS	6	8	Ret	7	7	31
11	(Norway) Egidio Perfetti	(Germany) Team Project 1	DNS	6	8	Ret	7	7	31
11	(Italy) Antonio Fuoco	(Italy) Cetilar Racing	7	5	15	Ret	13	8	28
12	(Italy) Roberto Lacorte	(Italy) Cetilar Racing	7	5	15	Ret	13	8	28
12	(Italy) Giorgio Sernagiotto	(Italy) Cetilar Racing	7	5	15	Ret	13	8	28
13	(Italy) Claudio Schiavoni	(Italy) Iron Lynx	13	9	Ret	6		9	22.5
14	(Brazil) Marcos Gomes	(United Kingdom) Aston Martin Racing	10	8	6	Ret	8	14	20
14	(Canada) Paul Dalla Lana	(United Kingdom) Aston Martin Racing	10	8	6	Ret	8	14	20
14	(Brazil) Augusto Farfus	(United Kingdom) Aston Martin Racing	10	8	6		8	14	20
15	(Italy) Francesco Castellacci	(Italy) AF Corse	8	7	11	11	11	10	17
15	(Italy) Giancarlo Fisichella	(Italy) AF Corse	8	7	11	11	11	10	17
15	(Switzerland) Thomas Flohr	(Italy) AF Corse	8	7	11	11	11	10	17
16	(Italy) Raffaele Giammaria	(Italy) Iron Lynx				6			16
16	(Italy) Paolo Ruberti	(Italy) Iron Lynx				6			16
17	(Japan) Tomonobu Fujii	(Japan) D'station Racing	11	Ret	7	8	14	11	16
17	(Japan) Satoshi Hoshino	(Japan) D'station Racing	11	Ret	7	8	14	11	16
17	(United Kingdom) Andrew Watson	(Japan) D'station Racing	11	Ret	7	8	14	11	16
18	(Switzerland) Rahel Frey	(Italy) Iron Lynx	12	10	12	9	12	12	8.5
19	(Italy) Matteo Cressoni	(Italy) Iron Lynx	13	9	Ret		15	9	7
19	(Italy) Andrea Piccini	(Italy) Iron Lynx	13	9	Ret		15	9	7
20	(Denmark) Michelle Gatting	(Italy) Iron Lynx		10	12	9			6.5
21	(Belgium) Sarah Bovy	(Italy) Iron Lynx			12	9	12	12	6
22	(United Kingdom) Ben Barker	(United Kingdom) GR Racing	Ret	12	13	13	10	13	4.5
22	(United Kingdom) Tom Gamble	(United Kingdom) GR Racing	Ret	12	13	13	10	13	4.5
22	(United Kingdom) Michael Wainwright	(United Kingdom) GR Racing	Ret	12	13	13	10	13	4.5
23	(Germany) Marco Seefried	(Germany) Dempsey-Proton Racing	9	13	10				4
24	(Indonesia) Andrew Haryanto	(Germany) Dempsey-Proton Racing	9		10				3
24	(Belgium) Alessio Picariello	(Germany) Dempsey-Proton Racing	9		10				3
25	(United Kingdom) Sam Bird	(Italy) AF Corse				**10**			3
Pos.	Driver	Team	SPA (Belgium)	POR (Portugal)	MNZ (Italy)	LMS (France)	BHR (Bahrain)	BHR (Bahrain)	Points

==== Endurance Trophy for LMP2 Drivers ====
Pos.	Driver	Team	SPA (Belgium)	POR (Portugal)	MNZ (Italy)	LMS (France)	BHR (Bahrain)	BHR (Bahrain)	Points
1	(Netherlands) Robin Frijns	(Belgium) Team WRT	10	4	**2**	1	1	1	151
1	(Austria) Ferdinand von Habsburg	(Belgium) Team WRT	10	4	**2**	1	1	1	151
1	(France) Charles Milesi	(Belgium) Team WRT	10	4	**2**	1	1	1	151
2	(Indonesia) Sean Gelael	(United Kingdom) Jota	3	**2**	5	2	**2**	3	131
2	(United Kingdom) Tom Blomqvist	(United Kingdom) Jota	3	**2**	5	2	**2**	3	131
2	(Belgium) Stoffel Vandoorne	(United Kingdom) Jota	3	**2**	5	2	**2**	3	131
3	(United Kingdom) Anthony Davidson	(United Kingdom) Jota	2	1	Ret	**4**	3	2	123
3	(Portugal) António Félix da Costa	(United Kingdom) Jota	2	1	Ret	**4**	3	2	123
3	(Mexico) Roberto González	(United Kingdom) Jota	2	1	Ret	**4**	3	2	123
4	(United Kingdom) Phil Hanson	(United States) United Autosports USA	**1**	3	1	10	4	**4**	107
5	(Switzerland) Fabio Scherer	(United States) United Autosports USA	**1**	WD	1	10	4	**4**	84
5	(Portugal) Filipe Albuquerque	(United States) United Autosports USA	**1**		1	10	4	**4**	84
6	(United Kingdom) Alex Brundle	(Poland) Inter Europol Competition	5	5	4	3	9	5	84
6	(Poland) Jakub Śmiechowski	(Poland) Inter Europol Competition	5	5	4	3	9	5	84
7	(Netherlands) Renger van der Zande	(Poland) Inter Europol Competition	5		4	3	9	5	69
8	(Netherlands) Frits van Eerd	(Netherlands) Racing Team Nederland	4	10	3	6	5	6	67
9	(Netherlands) Giedo van der Garde	(Netherlands) Racing Team Nederland	4	10	WD	6	5	6	52
9	(Netherlands) Job van Uitert	(Netherlands) Racing Team Nederland	4	10	WD	6	5	6	52
10	(Switzerland) Esteban García	(Switzerland) Realteam Racing	6	7	7	7	7	7	50
10	(France) Norman Nato	(Switzerland) Realteam Racing	6	7	7	7	7	7	50
11	(United Kingdom) Ben Hanley	(United States) DragonSpeed USA	7	8	6	5	11	10	42.5
11	(Sweden) Henrik Hedman	(United States) DragonSpeed USA	7	8	6	5	11	10	42.5
11	(Colombia) Juan Pablo Montoya	(United States) DragonSpeed USA	7	8	6	5	11	10	42.5
12	(France) Loïc Duval	(Switzerland) Realteam Racing	6		7	7	7	7	41
13	(Germany) Sophia Flörsch	(France) Richard Mille Racing Team	8	6	8	Ret	6	9	31
14	(Netherlands) Beitske Visser	(France) Richard Mille Racing Team	8	6		Ret	6	9	27
15	(Denmark) Dennis Andersen	(Denmark) High Class Racing	9	9	9	8	8	8	25
16	(United Kingdom) Wayne Boyd	(United States) United Autosports USA		3					23
16	(United Kingdom) Paul di Resta	(United States) United Autosports USA		3					23
17	(Colombia) Tatiana Calderón	(France) Richard Mille Racing Team	8	6	8	Ret		9	23
18	(Denmark) Anders Fjordbach	(Denmark) High Class Racing	9	9	9		8	8	17
19	(Netherlands) Nyck de Vries	(Netherlands) Racing Team Nederland			3				15
19	(France) Paul-Loup Chatin	(Netherlands) Racing Team Nederland			3				15
20	(Switzerland) Louis Delétraz	(Poland) Inter Europol Competition		5					15
21	(Poland) Robert Kubica	(Denmark) High Class Racing					8	8	10
22	(Switzerland) Mathias Beche	(Switzerland) Realteam Racing		7					9
23	(France) Gabriel Aubry	(France) Richard Mille Racing Team					6		8
24	(Denmark) Marco Sørensen	(Denmark) High Class Racing				8			8
24	(United States) Ricky Taylor	(Denmark) High Class Racing				8			8
25	(Slovakia) Miroslav Konôpka	(Slovakia) ARC Bratislava	Ret	11	10	9	10	11	8
26	(Denmark) Jan Magnussen	(Denmark) High Class Racing	9	9	9				7
27	(United Kingdom) Oliver Webb	(Slovakia) ARC Bratislava		11	10	9	10		7
28	(Slovakia) Matej Konôpka	(Slovakia) ARC Bratislava			10	9			5
29	(United Kingdom) Tom Jackson	(Slovakia) ARC Bratislava	Ret	11					1
30	(India) Kush Maini	(Slovakia) ARC Bratislava					10		1
31	(United Kingdom) Olli Caldwell	(Slovakia) ARC Bratislava						11	1
31	(France) Nelson Panciatici	(Slovakia) ARC Bratislava						11	1
32	(United Kingdom) Darren Burke	(Slovakia) ARC Bratislava	Ret						0
Pos.	Driver	Team	SPA (Belgium)	POR (Portugal)	MNZ (Italy)	LMS (France)	BHR (Bahrain)	BHR (Bahrain)	Points

==== Endurance Trophy for LMP2 Pro/Am Drivers ====
Pos.	Driver	Team	SPA (Belgium)	POR (Portugal)	MNZ (Italy)	LMS (France)	BHR (Bahrain)	BHR (Bahrain)	Points
1	(Netherlands) Frits van Eerd	(Netherlands) Racing Team Nederland	**1**	**4**	1	2	1	1	167
2	(Switzerland) Esteban García	(Switzerland) Realteam Racing	2	1	3	**3**	**2**	**2**	146
2	(France) Norman Nato	(Switzerland) Realteam Racing	2	1	3	**3**	**2**	**2**	146
3	(Netherlands) Giedo van der Garde	(Netherlands) Racing Team Nederland	**1**	**4**	WD	2	1	1	142
3	(Netherlands) Job van Uitert	(Netherlands) Racing Team Nederland	**1**	**4**	WD	2	1	1	142
4	(United Kingdom) Ben Hanley	(United States) DragonSpeed USA	3	2	2	1	5	4	138
4	(Sweden) Henrik Hedman	(United States) DragonSpeed USA	3	2	2	1	5	4	138
4	(Colombia) Juan Pablo Montoya	(United States) DragonSpeed USA	3	2	2	1	5	4	138
5	(Denmark) Dennis Andersen	(Denmark) High Class Racing	4	3	4	4	3	3	109
6	(France) Loïc Duval	(Switzerland) Realteam Racing	2		3	**3**	2	**2**	108
7	(Denmark) Anders Fjordbach	(Denmark) High Class Racing	4	3	4		3	3	85
8	(Slovakia) Miroslav Konôpka	(Slovakia) ARC Bratislava	Ret	5	5	5	4	5	72
8	(United Kingdom) Oliver Webb	(Slovakia) ARC Bratislava		5	5	5	4		57
9	(Denmark) Jan Magnussen	(Denmark) High Class Racing	4	3	4				47
10	(Switzerland) Mathias Beche	(Switzerland) Realteam Racing		1					38
11	(Poland) Robert Kubica	(Denmark) High Class Racing					3	3	38
12	(Slovakia) Matej Konôpka	(Slovakia) ARC Bratislava			5	5			30
13	(Netherlands) Nyck de Vries	(Netherlands) Racing Team Nederland			1				25
13	(France) Paul Loup Chatin	(Netherlands) Racing Team Nederland			1				25
14	(Denmark) Marco Sørensen	(Denmark) High Class Racing				4			24
14	(United States) Ricky Taylor	(Denmark) High Class Racing				4			24
15	(United Kingdom) Tom Jackson	(Slovakia) ARC Bratislava	Ret	5					15
16	(United Kingdom) Olli Caldwell	(Slovakia) ARC Bratislava						5	15
16	(France) Nelson Panciatici	(Slovakia) ARC Bratislava						5	15
17	(India) Kush Maini	(Slovakia) ARC Bratislava					4		12
	(United Kingdom) Darren Burke	(Slovakia) ARC Bratislava	Ret						0
Pos.	Driver	Team	SPA (Belgium)	POR (Portugal)	MNZ (Italy)	LMS (France)	BHR (Bahrain)	BHR (Bahrain)	Points

==== Endurance Trophy for GTE Am Drivers ====
Pos.	Driver	Team	SPA (Belgium)	POR (Portugal)	MNZ (Italy)	LMS (France)	BHR (Bahrain)	BHR (Bahrain)	Points
1	(Denmark) Nicklas Nielsen	(Italy) AF Corse	1	10	1	1	5	1	150
1	(France) François Perrodo	(Italy) AF Corse	1	10	1	1	5	1	150
1	(Italy) Alessio Rovera	(Italy) AF Corse	1	10	1	1	5	1	150
2	(Brazil) Felipe Fraga	(United Kingdom) TF Sport	**2**	7	**12**	2	1	Ret	90.5
2	(United States) Ben Keating	(United Kingdom) TF Sport	**2**	7	**12**	2	1	Ret	90.5
2	(Luxembourg) Dylan Pereira	(United Kingdom) TF Sport	**2**	7	**12**	2	1	Ret	90.5
3	(Australia) Matt Campbell	(Germany) Dempsey-Proton Racing	Ret	Ret	5	4	2	2	79
3	(New Zealand) Jaxon Evans	(Germany) Dempsey-Proton Racing	Ret	Ret	5	4	2	2	79
3	(Germany) Christian Ried	(Germany) Dempsey-Proton Racing	Ret	Ret	5	4	2	2	79
4	(Italy) Matteo Cairoli	(Germany) Team Project 1	DNS	**2**	4	Ret	3	3	78
4	(Italy) Riccardo Pera	(Germany) Team Project 1	DNS	**2**	4	Ret	3	3	78
4	(Norway) Egidio Perfetti	(Germany) Team Project 1	DNS	**2**	4	Ret	3	3	78
5	(Italy) Antonio Fuoco	(Italy) Cetilar Racing	3	1	10	Ret	9	**4**	75
5	(Italy) Roberto Lacorte	(Italy) Cetilar Racing	3	1	10	Ret	9	**4**	75
5	(Italy) Giorgio Sernagiotto	(Italy) Cetilar Racing	3	1	10	Ret	9	**4**	75
6	(Italy) Francesco Castellacci	(Italy) AF Corse	4	3	7	7	7	6	71
6	(Italy) Giancarlo Fisichella	(Italy) AF Corse	4	3	7	7	7	6	71
6	(Switzerland) Thomas Flohr	(Italy) AF Corse	4	3	7	7	7	6	71
7	(Italy) Claudio Schiavoni	(Italy) Iron Lynx	9	5	Ret	3		5	62
8	(Brazil) Marcos Gomes	(United Kingdom) Aston Martin Racing	6	4	2	Ret	4	10	58
8	(Canada) Paul Dalla Lana	(United Kingdom) Aston Martin Racing	6	4	2	Ret	4	10	58
8	(Brazil) Augusto Farfus	(United Kingdom) Aston Martin Racing	6	4	2		4	10	58
9	(Japan) Tomonobu Fujii	(Japan) D'station Racing	7	Ret	3	5	10	7	51
9	(Japan) Satoshi Hoshino	(Japan) D'station Racing	7	Ret	3	5	10	7	51
9	(United Kingdom) Andrew Watson	(Japan) D'station Racing	7	Ret	3	5	10	7	51
10	(Switzerland) Rahel Frey	(Italy) Iron Lynx	8	6	8	6	8	8	46
11	(Italy) Matteo Cressoni	(Italy) Iron Lynx	9	5	Ret		**11**	5	33.5
11	(Italy) Andrea Piccini	(Italy) Iron Lynx	9	5	Ret		**11**	5	33.5
12	(Denmark) Michelle Gatting	(Italy) Iron Lynx		6	8	6			32
13	(Italy) Raffaele Giammaria	(Italy) Iron Lynx				3			30
13	(Italy) Paolo Ruberti	(Italy) Iron Lynx				3			30
14	(Belgium) Sarah Bovy	(Italy) Iron Lynx			8	6	8	8	30
15	(United Kingdom) Ben Barker	(United Kingdom) GR Racing	Ret	8	8	9	6	9	23
15	(United Kingdom) Tom Gamble	(United Kingdom) GR Racing	Ret	8	8	9	6	9	23
15	(United Kingdom) Michael Wainwright	(United Kingdom) GR Racing	Ret	8	8	9	6	9	23
16	(Germany) Marco Seefried	(Germany) Dempsey-Proton Racing	5	9	6				21
17	(Indonesia) Andrew Haryanto	(Germany) Dempsey-Proton Racing	5		6				18
17	(Belgium) Alessio Picariello	(Germany) Dempsey-Proton Racing	5		6				18
18	(Italy) Manuela Gostner	(Italy) Iron Lynx	8	6					16
19	(United Kingdom) Katherine Legge	(Italy) Iron Lynx	8				8	8	14
20	(France) Julien Andlauer	(Germany) Dempsey-Proton Racing		9		**8**	12	Ret	12.5
21	(United States) Dominique Bastien	(Germany) Dempsey-Proton Racing		9		**8**			12
22	(Germany) Lance Arnold	(Germany) Dempsey-Proton Racing				**8**			9
23	(Italy) Rino Mastronardi	(Italy) Iron Lynx					**11**		1.5
24	(Norway) Anders Buchardt	(Germany) Team Project 1	WD		11	Ret			0.5
24	(Norway) Dennis Olsen	(Germany) Team Project 1	WD		11	Ret			0.5
24	(United States) Maxwell Root	(Germany) Team Project 1			11				0.5
25	(United Arab Emirates) Khaled Al Qubaisi	(Germany) Dempsey-Proton Racing					12	Ret	0.5
25	(Belgium) Adrien De Leener	(Germany) Dempsey-Proton Racing					12		0.5
	(United States) Robby Foley	(Germany) Team Project 1				Ret			0
	(Denmark) Nicki Thiim	(United Kingdom) Aston Martin Racing				Ret			0
	(Zimbabwe) Axcil Jefferies	(Germany) Team Project 1	WD						0
	(Zimbabwe) Axcil Jefferies	(Germany) Dempsey-Proton Racing						Ret	0
Pos.	Driver	Team	SPA (Belgium)	POR (Portugal)	MNZ (Italy)	LMS (France)	BHR (Bahrain)	BHR (Bahrain)	Points

=== Manufacturers' and teams' championships ===
A world championship was awarded for LMGTE manufacturers and for Hypercar teams. FIA Endurance Trophies were awarded for LMP2, LMP2 Pro/Am and LMGTE Am teams.

==== Hypercar World Endurance Championship ====
Points were awarded only for the highest finishing competitor from each team.

Pos.	Team	SPA (Belgium)	POR (Portugal)	MNZ (Italy)	LMS (France)	BHR (Bahrain)	BHR (Bahrain)	Points
1	(Japan) Toyota Gazoo Racing	**1**	1	**1**	**1**	**1**	**1**	206
2	(France) Alpine Elf Matmut	2	**3**	2	3	3	3	128
3	(United States) Glickenhaus Racing		29	4	4			37

==== World Endurance GTE Manufacturers' Championship ====
Points were awarded to the two best finishing cars from each manufacturer across both GTE categories.

Pos.	Manufacturer	SPA (Belgium)	POR (Portugal)	MNZ (Italy)	LMS (France)	BHR (Bahrain)	BHR (Bahrain)	Points
1	(Italy) Ferrari	2	1	2	**1**	3	1	291
1	(Italy) Ferrari	3	2	4	4	4	3	291
2	(Germany) Porsche	**1**	**3**	**1**	2	**1**	**2**	277
2	(Germany) Porsche	4	4	3	3	2	4	277

==== Endurance Trophy for LMP2 Teams ====
Points were awarded only for the highest finishing competitor from each team.

Pos.	Car	Team	SPA (Belgium)	POR (Portugal)	MNZ (Italy)	LMS (France)	BHR (Bahrain)	BHR (Bahrain)	Points
1	31	(Belgium) Team WRT	10	4	**2**	1	1	1	151
2	28	(United Kingdom) Jota	3	**2**	5	2	**2**	3	131
3	38	(United Kingdom) Jota	2	1	Ret	**4**	3	2	123
4	22	(United States) United Autosports USA	**1**	3	1	10	4	**4**	107
5	34	(Poland) Inter Europol Competition	5	5	4	3	9	5	84
6	29	(Netherlands) Racing Team Nederland	4	10	3	6	5	6	67
7	70	(Switzerland) Realteam Racing	6	7	7	7	7	7	50
8	21	(United States) DragonSpeed USA	7	8	6	5	11	10	42.5
9	1	(France) Richard Mille Racing Team	8	6	8	Ret	6	9	31
10	20	(Denmark) High Class Racing	9	9	9	8	8	8	25
11	44	(Slovakia) ARC Bratislava	Ret	11	10	9	10	11	8

==== Endurance Trophy for LMP2 Pro/Am Teams ====
Points were awarded only for the highest finishing competitor from each team.

Pos.	Car	Team	SPA (Belgium)	POR (Portugal)	MNZ (Italy)	LMS (France)	BHR (Bahrain)	BHR (Bahrain)	Points
1	29	(Netherlands) Racing Team Nederland	**1**	**4**	1	2	1	1	167
2	70	(Switzerland) Realteam Racing	2	1	3	**3**	**2**	**2**	146
3	21	(United States) DragonSpeed USA	3	2	**2**	1	5	4	138
4	20	(Denmark) High Class Racing	4	3	4	4	3	3	109
5	44	(Slovakia) ARC Bratislava	Ret	5	5	5	4	5	72

==== Endurance Trophy for GTE Am Teams ====
Points were awarded only for the highest finishing competitor from each team.

Pos.	Car	Team	SPA (Belgium)	POR (Portugal)	MNZ (Italy)	LMS (France)	BHR (Bahrain)	BHR (Bahrain)	Points
1	83	(Italy) AF Corse	1	10	1	1	5	1	150
2	33	(United Kingdom) TF Sport	**2**	7	**12**	2	1	Ret	90.5
3	77	(Germany) Dempsey-Proton Racing	Ret	Ret	5	4	2	2	79
4	56	(Germany) Team Project 1	DNS	**2**	4	Ret	3	3	78
5	47	(Italy) Cetilar Racing	3	1	10	Ret	9	**4**	75
6	54	(Italy) AF Corse	4	3	7	7	7	6	71
7	60	(Italy) Iron Lynx	9	5	Ret	3	**11**	5	63.5
8	98	(United Kingdom) Aston Martin Racing	6	4	2	Ret	4	10	58
9	777	(Japan) D'station Racing	7	Ret	3	5	10	7	51
10	85	(Italy) Iron Lynx	8	6	8	6	8	8	46
11	88	(Germany) Dempsey-Proton Racing	5	9	6	**8**	12	Ret	30.5
12	86	(United Kingdom) GR Racing	Ret	8	9	9	6	9	21
13	46	(Germany) Team Project 1	WD		11	Ret			0.5
