= 6 Hours of Portimão =

Endurance sports car event

(Portugal) 6 Hours of Portimão

FIA World Endurance Championship
- Venue: Algarve International Circuit
- First race: 2021
- First FIA WEC race: 2021
- Last race: 2023
- Duration: 6 hours
- Previous names: 8 Hours of Portimão
- Most wins (driver): Sébastien Buemi; Brendon Hartley (2)
- Most wins (team): Toyota Gazoo Racing (2)
- Most wins (manufacturer): Toyota (2)

The 6 Hours of Portimão was an endurance race for sports cars held at Algarve International Circuit in Portugal.

== History ==
The Algarve International Circuit was constructed in 2008 and has hosted European Le Mans Series races before with the 4 Hours of Portimão. In January 2021, it was announced that the track would host the opening round of the 2021 FIA World Endurance Championship, replacing the cancelled round at Sebring. On 26 February 2021 it was confirmed that the race would take place behind closed doors. The race was initially scheduled to take place on the 2–4 April 2021 but was later rescheduled to the second race of the season, held on the 12–13 June 2021.

On 29 September 2022, the calendar of the 2023 FIA World Endurance Championship was announced on their website and YouTube channel. The calendar confirmed the return of the championship to the Algarve International Circuit, this time in a 6-hour format instead of an 8-hour format.

== Winners ==
Year	Drivers	Team	Car	Tyre	Time	Laps	Distance	Championship	Report	Ref
8 hour format
2021	(Switzerland) Sébastien Buemi (Japan) Kazuki Nakajima (New Zealand) Brendon Hartley	(Japan) Toyota Gazoo Racing	Toyota GR010 Hybrid	M	8:00:15.414	300	1395.630 km (867.30 miles)	FIA World Endurance Championship	Report	
6 hour format
2023	(Switzerland) Sébastien Buemi (New Zealand) Brendon Hartley (Japan) Ryo Hirakawa	(Japan) Toyota Gazoo Racing	Toyota GR010 Hybrid	M	6:01:26.343	222	1032.698 km (641.69 miles)	FIA World Endurance Championship	Report	
