= André Negrão =

Brazilian racing driver

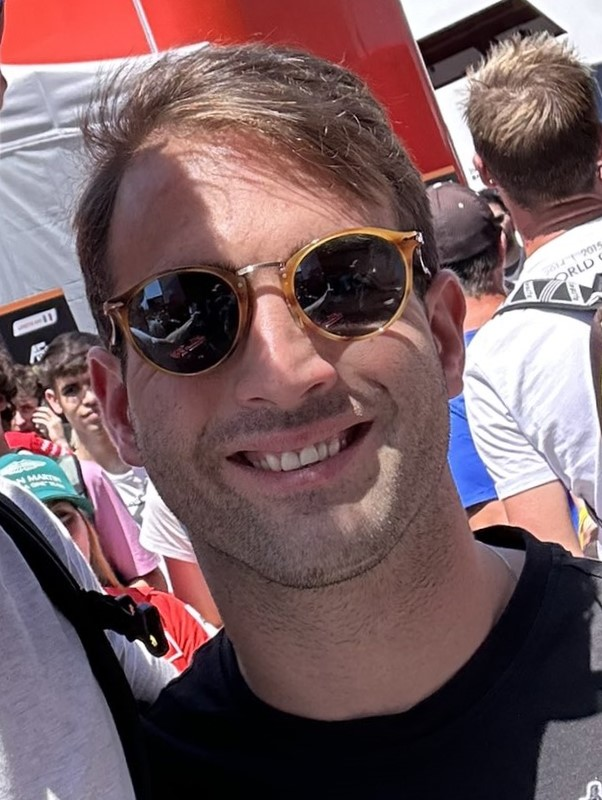
- Negrão in 2023
- Nationality: (Brazil) Brazilian
- Born: 17 June 1992 (age 34) São Paulo, Brazil

FIA World Endurance Championship career
- Debut season: 2017
- Current team: Alpine Elf Team
- Categorisation: FIA Silver (2017); FIA Gold (2018–)
- Car number: 36
- Best finish: 1st in 2018–19

Previous series
- 2017– 2018–2020 2016 2014–15 2011–13, 15 2010 2010 2010 2010 2009 2009 2009 2008 2008: WEC; European Le Mans Series; Indy Lights; GP2 Series; Formula Renault 3.5 Series; Eurocup Formula Renault 2.0; Formula Renault 2.0 NEC; Formula Abarth; British Formula Renault 2.0; Italian Formula Renault 2.0; Swiss Formula Renault 2.0; South American Formula Three; Portuguese Formula Renault 2.0; Formula Renault 2.0 WEC

Championship titles
- 2018–19: FIA Endurance Trophy for LMP2 Drivers

24 Hours of Le Mans career
- Years: 2018 /2019 –
- Teams: Signatech Alpine Matmut
- Best finish: 1th (2018/2019)
- Class wins: 2 (2018, 2019)

André Negrão (born 17 June 1992) is a Brazilian racing driver. He most recently drove for Alpine in the LMP2 class of the FIA World Endurance Championship in 2023, and spent a total of seven seasons with the team during his tenure. Negrão is a former LMP2 champion in the series, and is also a two-time LMP2 class winner at the 24 Hours of Le Mans, winning in 2018 and 2019.

== Early career ==
Negrão was born in Campinas, in São Paulo state. He started his trajectory in motorsports when he was twelve years old, although his family has a tradition in Brazilian motorsports. Guto, his father, Xandy, his uncle, and Xandinho, his cousin, are race drivers too.

When Negrão accompanied his cousin at Granja Viana's 500 Miles Kart, in 2003, he started his career in motorsports. After some seasons in karting, Negrão was Brazilian Kart's runner-up in 2006, and started in European motorsports two years later, in Formula Renault 2.0. He also ran in the Formula Renault Winter Series in the same year, finishing third.

One year later, Negrão raced in the Eurocup Formula Renault 2.0, and the Italian and Swiss championships' division, as well as some South American Formula 3 rounds. In 2010, he competed in the Eurocup Formula Renault 2.0 and British Formula Renault, in addition to racing in Italian Formula Abarth and the Formula 3 Brazil Open.

Negrão stepped up to the World Series by Renault 3.5 in 2011, remaining in 2012 and 2013, and then returning in 2015. In 2014 and 2015, he ran in the GP2 Series, the current Formula 2. One year later, Negrão raced in Indy Lights and received a test in IndyCar.

== Sportscar career ==
In 2017, Alpine invted Negrão to move to the WEC.

Negrão won twice the legendary 24 Hours of Le Mans, the main endurance race of the world, in the LMP2 class in 2018 and 2019, beside Nicolas Lapierre and Pierre Thiriet. They also won the 2018–19 WEC super-season in the same class.

In 2021, Negrão drove in Hypercar, WEC's new main class, with Alpine Elf Matmut. He shared the Alpine A480 with French drivers Matthieu Vaxivière and Nicolas Lapierre and finished third in the championship.

For the 2022 season, Negrão, Lapierre and Vaxivière returned to Alpine to race in the WEC. The squad began the season well, winning the season opener in Sebring before finishing second at Spa. Problems with the car meant that Negrão and his teammates would only take fourth place in the 24 Hours of Le Mans, although a victory in Monza put the team into the lead of the championship. Despite finishing on the podium in the final two races, Alpine placed second behind the Toyota No. 7 car, with a power reduction as a result of the BoP system having played a part in the team's lack of pace at the end of the year.

Negrão and Alpine returned to the LMP2 class in 2023, as the Brazilian was partnered by experienced Mexican Memo Rojas and British rookie Olli Caldwell. The trio struggled, finishing eleventh and last in the teams' standings with a best race finish of eighth.

== Racing record ==
=== Career summary ===
Season	Series	Team	Races	Wins	Poles	F/Laps	Podiums	Points	Position
2008	Formula Renault 2.0 WEC	Epsilon Sport Team	3	0	0	0	0	0	51st
2008	Portuguese Formula Renault 2.0 Winter Series	Epsilon Sport Team	4	0	0	0	1	20	**3rd**
2009	Italian Formula Renault 2.0	Cram Competition	4	0	0	0	0	66	15th
2009	Swiss Formula Renault 2.0	Cram Competition	4	0	0	0	0	36	15th
2009	Formula 3 Sudamericana	Kemba Racing	3	0	0	0	0	4	12th
2010	Eurocup Formula Renault 2.0	Cram Competition	16	0	1	0	1	25	13th
2010	Formula Renault 2.0 NEC	Cram Competition	2	0	0	0	1	36	23rd
2010	Formula Abarth	Cram Competition	4	0	0	0	1	23	14th
2010	Formula Renault UK	Cram Competition	2	0	0	0	0	8	32nd
2010	Formula 3 Brazil Open	Cesário Fórmula	1	0	1	0	1	N/A	**2nd**
2011	Formula Renault 3.5 Series	International Draco Racing	14	0	0	0	0	20	20th
2012	Formula Renault 3.5 Series	International Draco Racing	17	0	0	0	1	36	15th
2012	Formula 3 Brazil Open	Hitech Racing Brazil	1	0	0	0	1	N/A	**2nd**
2013	Formula Renault 3.5 Series	International Draco Racing	17	0	1	0	1	51	10th
2014	GP2 Series	Arden International	20	0	0	0	0	31	12th
2015	GP2 Series	Arden International	21	0	0	0	0	5	20th
2015	Formula Renault 3.5 Series	International Draco Racing	4	0	0	0	0	4	21st
2016	Indy Lights	Schmidt Peterson Motorsports	18	0	0	0	5	268	7th
2017	FIA World Endurance Championship – LMP2	Signatech Alpine Matmut	8	1	3	0	5	132	5th
2017	24 Hours of Le Mans – LMP2	Signatech Alpine Matmut	1	0	0	0	1	N/A	**3rd**
2018	European Le Mans Series – LMP2	Signatech Alpine Matmut	1	0	0	0	0	10	18th
2018	24 Hours of Le Mans – LMP2	Signatech Alpine Matmut	1	1	0	0	1	N/A	**1st**
2018–19	FIA World Endurance Championship – LMP2	Signatech Alpine Matmut	8	1	1	0	8	181	**1st**
2019	24 Hours of Le Mans – LMP2	Signatech Alpine Matmut	1	1	0	0	1	N/A	**1st**
2019–20	FIA World Endurance Championship – LMP2	Signatech Alpine Elf	8	0	0	0	2	109	8th
2020	European Le Mans Series – LMP2	Richard Mille Racing Team	2	0	0	0	0	18	14th
2020	24 Hours of Le Mans – LMP2	Signatech Alpine Elf	1	0	0	0	0	N/A	4th
2020	Alpine Elf Europa Cup	Racing Technology	2	0	0	0	0	0	NC†
2021	FIA World Endurance Championship – Hypercar	Alpine Elf Matmut	6	0	0	0	6	128	**3rd**
2021	24 Hours of Le Mans – Hypercar	Alpine Elf Matmut	1	0	0	0	1	N/A	**3rd**
2022	FIA World Endurance Championship – Hypercar	Alpine Elf Team	6	2	0	0	5	144	**2nd**
2022	24 Hours of Le Mans – Hypercar	Alpine Elf Team	1	0	0	0	0	N/A	5th
2023	FIA World Endurance Championship – LMP2	Alpine Elf Team	7	0	0	0	0	23	18th
2023	24 Hours of Le Mans – LMP2	Alpine Elf Team	1	0	0	0	0	N/A	9th
2026	Stock Car Pro Series	Scuderia Chiarelli	1	0	0	0	0	12	52nd*

^{†} As Negrão was a guest driver, he was ineligible to score points.
^{*} Season still in progress.

=== Complete Formula Renault 2.0 NEC results ===
(key) (Races in bold indicate pole position) (Races in italics indicate fastest lap)

Year	Entrant	1	2	3	4	5	6	7	8	9	10	11	12	13	14	15	16	17	18	19	20	DC	Points
2010	Cram Competition	HOC; 1	HOC; 2	BRN; 1; 3	BRN; 2; 5	ZAN; 1	ZAN; 2	OSC; 1	OSC; 2	OSC; 3	ASS; 1	ASS; 2	MST; 1	MST; 2	MST; 3	SPA; 1	SPA; 2	SPA; 3	NÜR; 1	NÜR; 2	NÜR; 3	23rd	36

=== Complete Eurocup Formula Renault 2.0 results ===
(key) (Races in bold indicate pole position) (Races in italics indicate fastest lap)

Year	Entrant	1	2	3	4	5	6	7	8	9	10	11	12	13	14	15	16	Pos	Points
2010	Cram Competition	**ALC**; **1** Ret	ALC; 2 Ret	SPA; 1 Ret	SPA; 2; 3	BRN; 1; 11	BRN; 2 Ret	MAG; 1; 11	MAG; 2; 9	HUN; 1 Ret	HUN; 2; 18	HOC; 1 Ret	HOC; 2; 9	SIL; 1; 10	SIL; 2; 13	CAT; 1; 13	CAT; 2; 9	13th	25

=== Complete Formula Renault 3.5 Series results ===
(key) (Races in bold indicate pole position) (Races in italics indicate fastest lap)

Year	Team	1	2	3	4	5	6	7	8	9	10	11	12	13	14	15	16	17	Pos	Points
2011	International Draco Racing	ALC; 1; 14	ALC; 2; 9	SPA; 1 DNS	SPA; 2; 11	MNZ; 1; 10	MNZ; 2; 10	MON; 1 Ret	NÜR; 1; 6	NÜR; 2; 12	HUN; 1; 20	HUN; 2 Ret	SIL; 1 Ret	SIL; 2; 16	LEC; 1; 15	LEC; 2; 6	CAT; 1	CAT; 2	20th	20
2012	International Draco Racing	ALC; 1; 8	ALC; 2; 10	MON; 1 Ret	SPA; 1; 12	SPA; 2; 12	NÜR; 1; 19	NÜR; 2; 3	MSC; 1; 13	MSC; 2; 4	SIL; 1 Ret	SIL; 2; 16	HUN; 1; 15	HUN; 2 Ret	LEC; 1 Ret	LEC; 2; 22	CAT; 1; 14	CAT; 2; 8	15th	36
2013	International Draco Racing	MNZ; 1; 11	MNZ; 2; 13	ALC; 1 Ret	ALC; 2; 8	MON; 1; 12	SPA; 1; 7	SPA; 2 Ret	MSC; 1; 7	MSC; 2; 6	RBR; 1; 9	RBR; 2; 11	**HUN**; **1**; 21†	HUN; 2; 6	LEC; 1; 3	LEC; 2; 11	CAT; 1 Ret	CAT; 2 Ret	10th	51
2015	International Draco Racing	ALC; 1	ALC; 2	MON; 1	SPA; 1	SPA; 2	HUN; 1	HUN; 2	RBR; 1	RBR; 2	SIL; 1	SIL; 2	NÜR; 1	NÜR; 2	BUG; 1; 12	BUG; 2 Ret	JER; 1; 8	JER; 2; 12	21st	4

=== Complete GP2 Series results ===
(key) (Races in bold indicate pole position) (Races in italics indicate fastest lap)

Year	Entrant	1	2	3	4	5	6	7	8	9	10	11	12	13	14	15	16	17	18	19	20	21	22	DC	Points
2014	Arden International	BHR; FEA; 20	BHR; SPR; 18	CAT; FEA	CAT; SPR	MON; FEA; Ret	MON; SPR; 15	RBR; FEA; 16	RBR; SPR; 14	SIL; FEA; 20	SIL; SPR; 16	HOC; FEA; 18	HOC; SPR; 21	HUN; FEA; 15	HUN; SPR; Ret	SPA; FEA; 9	SPA; SPR; 8	MNZ; FEA; 5	MNZ; SPR; 5	SOC; FEA; 6	SOC; SPR; 6	YMC; FEA; Ret	YMC; SPR; 24	12th	31
2015	Arden International	BHR; FEA; 9	BHR; SPR; 8	CAT; FEA; 23†	CAT; SPR; 21	MON; FEA; 21	MON; SPR; 17	RBR; FEA; 16	RBR; SPR; 21	SIL; FEA; 20	SIL; SPR; 15	HUN; FEA; 20	HUN; SPR; 21	SPA; FEA; 20	SPA; SPR; 14	MNZ; FEA; 14	MNZ; SPR; 18	SOC; FEA; 15	SOC; SPR; 11	BHR; FEA; 17	BHR; SPR; 20	YMC; FEA; 9	YMC; SPR; C	20th	5

^{†} Driver did not finish the race, but was classified as he completed over 90% of the race distance.

=== American open-wheel racing results ===
==== Indy Lights ====
Year	Team	1	2	3	4	5	6	7	8	9	10	11	12	13	14	15	16	17	18	Rank	Points
2016	Schmidt Peterson Motorsports	STP; 6	STP; 5	PHX; 6	ALA; 8	ALA; 11	IMS; 9	IMS; 16	INDY; 15	RDA; 10	RDA; 2	IOW; 13	TOR; 11	TOR; 2	MOH; 2	MOH; 3	WGL; 3	LAG; 9	LAG; 6	7th	268

=== Complete FIA World Endurance Championship results ===
Year	Entrant	Class	Car	Engine	1	2	3	4	5	6	7	8	9	Rank	Points
2017	Signatech Alpine Matmut	LMP2	Alpine A470	Gibson GK428 4.2 L V8	SIL	SPA; 6	LMS; 3	NÜR; Ret	**MEX**; 2	**COA**; 1	FUJ; 2	SHA; 2	**BHR**; 4	5th	132
2018–19	Signatech Alpine Matmut	LMP2	Alpine A470	Gibson GK428 4.2 L V8	**SPA**; 2	LMS; 1	SIL; 3	FUJ; 3	SHA; 3	SEB; 2	SPA; 2	LMS; 1		1st	181
2019–20	Signatech Alpine Elf	LMP2	Alpine A470	Gibson GK428 4.2 L V8	SIL; 2	FUJ; 6	SHA; 4	BHR; 4	COA; 6	SPA; Ret	LMS; 3	BHR; 5		8th	109
2021	Alpine Elf Matmut	Hypercar	Alpine A480	Gibson GL458 4.5 L V8	SPA; 2	**ALG**; 3	MNZ; 2	LMS; 3	BHR; 3	BHR; 3				3rd	128
2022	Alpine Elf Team	Hypercar	Alpine A480	Gibson GL458 4.5 L V8	**SEB**; 1	SPA; 2	LMS; 4	MNZ; 1	FUJ; 3	BHR; 3				2nd	144
2023	Alpine Elf Team	LMP2	Alpine A470	Gibson GK428 4.2 L V8	SEB; Ret	ALG; 10	SPA; 8	LMS; 7	MNZ; 8	FUJ; 11	BHR; 10			18th	23

=== Complete 24 Hours of Le Mans results ===
Year	Team	Co-Drivers	Car	Class	Laps	Pos.	Class Pos.
2017	(France) Signatech Alpine Matmut	(France) Nelson Panciatici (France) Pierre Ragues	Alpine A470-Gibson	LMP2	362	4th	**3rd**
2018	(France) Signatech Alpine Matmut	(France) Nicolas Lapierre (France) Pierre Thiriet	Alpine A470-Gibson	LMP2	367	5th	**1st**
2019	(France) Signatech Alpine Matmut	(France) Nicolas Lapierre (France) Pierre Thiriet	Alpine A470-Gibson	LMP2	368	6th	**1st**
2020	(France) Signatech Alpine Elf	(France) Thomas Laurent (France) Pierre Ragues	Alpine A470-Gibson	LMP2	367	8th	4th
2021	(France) Alpine Elf Matmut	(France) Nicolas Lapierre (France) Matthieu Vaxivière	Alpine A480-Gibson	Hypercar	367	**3rd**	**3rd**
2022	(France) Alpine Elf Team	(France) Nicolas Lapierre (France) Matthieu Vaxivière	Alpine A480-Gibson	Hypercar	362	23rd	5th
2023	(France) Alpine Elf Team	(United Kingdom) Olli Caldwell (Mexico) Memo Rojas	Oreca 07-Gibson	LMP2	322	19th	9th

=== Complete European Le Mans Series results ===
Year	Entrant	Class	Chassis	Engine	1	2	3	4	5	6	Rank	Points
2018	Signatech Alpine Matmut	LMP2	Alpine A470	Gibson GK428 4.2 L V8	LEC; 5	MNZ	RBR	SIL	SPA	ALG	18th	10
2020	Richard Mille Racing Team	LMP2	Oreca 07	Gibson GK428 4.2 L V8	LEC; 5	SPA; 6	LEC	MNZ	ALG		14th	18

=== Complete Stock Car Pro Series results ===
Year	Team	Car	1	2	3	4	5	6	7	8	9	10	11	12	13	14	15	16	17	18	19	20	21	22	23	Rank	Points
2026	Scuderia Chiarelli	Chevrolet Tracker	CRS; 1	CRS; 2	CAS; 1	CAS; 2	INT; 1	INT; 2	GOI; 1	GOI; 2	CUI; 1	CUI; 2	VCA; 1	VCA; 2	SCZ; 1	SCZ; 2	CRS; 1	CRS; 2	BRA; 1; 21	CAS; 1	CAS; 2	VEL; 1	VEL; 2	INT; 1	INT; 2	52nd*	12*

^{*} Season still in progress.

Sporting positions
Preceded by Bruno Senna; Julien Canal	FIA Endurance Trophy for LMP2 Drivers; 2018–19; With: Nicolas Lapierre & Pierre Thiriet	Succeeded by Filipe Albuquerque; Phil Hanson
