= 2021 8 Hours of Portimão =

Endurance auto race

(Portugal) 2021 8 Hours of Portimão
Event information
- Round 2 of 6 in the 2021 FIA World Endurance Championship
- Date: 13 June 2021
- Location: Portimão
- Venue: Algarve International Circuit
- Duration: 8 Hours

Results
- Laps completed: 300
- Distance (km): 1395.9
- Distance (miles): 867.3
- Hypercar

Pole position
- Time: 1:30.364
- Team: (France) Alpine Elf Matmut

Winners
- Team: (Japan) Toyota Gazoo Racing
- Drivers: (United Kingdom) Mike Conway (Japan) Kamui Kobayashi (Argentina) José María López
- LMP2

Winners
- Team: (United Kingdom) JOTA
- Drivers: (Netherlands) Roberto González (Portugal) António Félix da Costa (United Kingdom) Anthony Davidson
- LMP2 Pro-Am

Winners
- Team: (Switzerland) Realteam Racing
- Drivers: (Switzerland) Esteban Garcia (Switzerland) Mathias Beche (France) Norman Nato
- LMGTE Pro

Winners
- Team: (Italy) AF Corse
- Drivers: (United Kingdom) James Calado (Italy) Alessandro Pier Guidi
- LMGTE Am

Winners
- Team: (Italy) Cetilar Racing
- Drivers: (Italy) Roberto Lacorte (Italy) Giorgio Sernagiotto (Italy) Antonio Fuoco

The 2021 8 Hours of Portimão was an endurance sports car racing event held at the Algarve International Circuit, Algarve, Portugal, on 13 June 2021. It served as the second round of the 2021 FIA World Endurance Championship, and was the first running of the event as part of the championship. The race marked the debut of the Glickenhaus Racing car called the 007 LMH. The race was originally scheduled to be the opening round of the championship, replacing a race at Sebring International Raceway in Florida due to travel issues relating to the COVID-19 pandemic. The race was later postponed from the original date of 4 April due to quarantine regulations in Portugal, meaning it would no-longer be the opening round. The race was won by the Toyota GR010 Hybrid of Sebastien Buemi, Kazuki Nakajima and Brendon Hartley.

== Qualifying ==
=== Qualifying Results ===
Pole position winners in each class are marked in bold.

Pos	Class	Team	Time	Gap	Grid
1	**Hypercar**	**No. 36 Alpine Elf Matmut**	**1:30.364**	-	**1**
2	Hypercar	No. 8 Toyota Gazoo Racing	1:30.458	+0.094	2
3	Hypercar	No. 7 Toyota Gazoo Racing	1:30.540	+0.176	3
**4**	**LMP2**	**No. 28 JOTA**	**1:31.210**	**+0.846**	**4**
5	LMP2	No. 38 JOTA	1:31.255	+0.891	5
6	**LMP2 Pro-Am**	**No. 29 Racing Team Nederland**	**1:31.545**	**+1.181**	**6**
7	LMP2	No. 22 United Autosports USA	1:31.598	+1.234	7
8	LMP2	No. 31 Team WRT	1:31.648	+1.284	8
9	LMP2	No. 34 Inter Europol Competition	1:31.737	+1.373	9
10	LMP2 Pro-Am	No. 70 Realteam Racing	1:31.854	+1.490	10
11	Hypercar	No. 709 Glickenhaus Racing	1:32.167	+1.803	11
12	LMP2 Pro-Am	No. 21 DragonSpeed USA	1:32.526	+2.162	12
13	LMP2 Pro-Am	No. 20 High Class Racing	1:32.626	+2.262	13
14	LMP2	No. 1 Richard Mille Racing Team	1:32.748	+2.384	14
15	LMP2 Pro-Am	No. 44 ARC Bratislava	1:34.224	+3.860	15
16	**LMGTE Pro**	**No. 92 Porsche GT Team**	**1:37.986**	**+7.622**	**16**
17	LMGTE Pro	No. 51 AF Corse	1:38.359	+7.995	17
18	LMGTE Pro	No. 91 Porsche GT Team	1:38.389	+8.025	18
19	LMGTE Pro	No. 52 AF Corse	1:38.743	+8.379	19
20	**LMGTE Am**	**No. 56 Team Project 1**	**1:40.191**	**+9.827**	**20**
21	LMGTE Am	No. 77 Dempsey-Proton Racing	1:40.236	+9.872	21
22	LMGTE Am	No. 47 Cetilar Racing	1:40.885	+10.521	22
23	LMGTE Am	No. 54 AF Corse	1:41.001	+10.637	23
24	LMGTE Am	No. 85 Iron Lynx	1:41.085	+10.721	24
25	LMGTE Am	No. 83 AF Corse	1:41.141	+10.777	25
26	LMGTE Am	No. 57 Kessel Racing	1:41.276	+10.912	26
27	LMGTE Am	No. 98 Aston Martin Racing	1:41.366	+11.002	27
28	LMGTE Am	No. 777 D'station Racing	1:41.499	+11.135	28
29	LMGTE Am	No. 86 GR Racing	1:41.604	+11.240	29
30	LMGTE Am	No. 33 TF Sport	1:41.993	+11.629	30
31	LMGTE Am	No. 60 Iron Lynx	1:42.521	+12.157	31
32	LMGTE Am	No. 88 Dempsey-Proton Racing	1:43.374	+13.010	32

== Race ==
=== Race result ===
The minimum number of laps for classification (70% of the overall winning car's race distance) was 210 laps. Class winners are denoted in bold and with ‡.

Final race classification
Pos.	Class	No.	Team	Drivers	Chassis	Tyre	Laps	Time/Retired
Pos.	Class	No.	Team	Drivers	Engine	Tyre	Laps	Time/Retired
**1**	**Hypercar**	**8**	**(Japan) Toyota Gazoo Racing**	**(Switzerland) Sébastien Buemi** **(Japan) Kazuki Nakajima** **(New Zealand) Brendon Hartley**	**Toyota GR010 Hybrid**	M	**300**	**8:00:15.414** ‡
**1**	**Hypercar**	**8**	**(Japan) Toyota Gazoo Racing**	**(Switzerland) Sébastien Buemi** **(Japan) Kazuki Nakajima** **(New Zealand) Brendon Hartley**	**Toyota 3.5 L Turbo V6**	M	**300**	**8:00:15.414** ‡
2	Hypercar	7	(Japan) Toyota Gazoo Racing	(United Kingdom) Mike Conway (Japan) Kamui Kobayashi (Argentina) José María López	Toyota GR010 Hybrid	M	300	+1.800
2	Hypercar	7	(Japan) Toyota Gazoo Racing	(United Kingdom) Mike Conway (Japan) Kamui Kobayashi (Argentina) José María López	Toyota 3.5 L Turbo V6	M	300	+1.800
3	Hypercar	36	(France) Alpine Elf Matmut	(Brazil) André Negrão (France) Nicolas Lapierre (France) Matthieu Vaxivière	Alpine A480	M	300	+1:08.597
3	Hypercar	36	(France) Alpine Elf Matmut	(Brazil) André Negrão (France) Nicolas Lapierre (France) Matthieu Vaxivière	Gibson GL458 4.5 L V8	M	300	+1:08.597
**4**	**LMP2**	**38**	**(United Kingdom) JOTA**	**(Mexico) Roberto González** **(Portugal) António Félix da Costa** **(United Kingdom) Anthony Davidson**	**Oreca 07**	G	**296**	**+4 Laps** ‡
**4**	**LMP2**	**38**	**(United Kingdom) JOTA**	**(Mexico) Roberto González** **(Portugal) António Félix da Costa** **(United Kingdom) Anthony Davidson**	**Gibson GK428 4.2 L V8**	G	**296**	**+4 Laps** ‡
5	LMP2	28	(United Kingdom) JOTA	(Indonesia) Sean Gelael (Belgium) Stoffel Vandoorne (United Kingdom) Tom Blomqvist	Oreca 07	G	296	+4 Laps
5	LMP2	28	(United Kingdom) JOTA	(Indonesia) Sean Gelael (Belgium) Stoffel Vandoorne (United Kingdom) Tom Blomqvist	Gibson GK428 4.2 L V8	G	296	+4 Laps
6	LMP2	22	(United Kingdom) United Autosports USA	(United Kingdom) Philip Hanson (United Kingdom) Wayne Boyd (United Kingdom) Paul di Resta	Oreca 07	G	295	+5 Laps
6	LMP2	22	(United Kingdom) United Autosports USA	(United Kingdom) Philip Hanson (United Kingdom) Wayne Boyd (United Kingdom) Paul di Resta	Gibson GK428 4.2 L V8	G	295	+5 Laps
7	LMP2	31	(Belgium) Team WRT	(Netherlands) Robin Frijns (Austria) Ferdinand Habsburg (France) Charles Milesi	Oreca 07	G	295	+5 Laps
7	LMP2	31	(Belgium) Team WRT	(Netherlands) Robin Frijns (Austria) Ferdinand Habsburg (France) Charles Milesi	Gibson GK428 4.2 L V8	G	295	+5 Laps
8	LMP2	34	(Poland) Inter Europol Competition	(Poland) Jakub Śmiechowski (Switzerland) Louis Delétraz (United Kingdom) Alex Brundle	Oreca 07	G	293	+7 Laps
8	LMP2	34	(Poland) Inter Europol Competition	(Poland) Jakub Śmiechowski (Switzerland) Louis Delétraz (United Kingdom) Alex Brundle	Gibson GK428 4.2 L V8	G	293	+7 Laps
9	LMP2	1	(France) Richard Mille Racing Team	(Colombia) Tatiana Calderón (Germany) Sophia Flörsch (Netherlands) Beitske Visser	Oreca 07	G	290	+10 Laps
9	LMP2	1	(France) Richard Mille Racing Team	(Colombia) Tatiana Calderón (Germany) Sophia Flörsch (Netherlands) Beitske Visser	Gibson GK428 4.2 L V8	G	290	+10 Laps
10	LMP2 **(Pro-Am)**	70	(Switzerland) Realteam Racing	(Switzerland) Esteban Garcia (Switzerland) Mathias Beche (France) Norman Nato	Oreca 07	G	290	+10 Laps ‡
10	LMP2 **(Pro-Am)**	70	(Switzerland) Realteam Racing	(Switzerland) Esteban Garcia (Switzerland) Mathias Beche (France) Norman Nato	Gibson GK428 4.2 L V8	G	290	+10 Laps ‡
11	LMP2 (Pro-Am)	21	(United States) DragonSpeed USA	(Sweden) Henrik Hedman (Colombia) Juan Pablo Montoya (United Kingdom) Ben Hanley	Oreca 07	G	288	+12 Laps
11	LMP2 (Pro-Am)	21	(United States) DragonSpeed USA	(Sweden) Henrik Hedman (Colombia) Juan Pablo Montoya (United Kingdom) Ben Hanley	Gibson GK428 4.2 L V8	G	288	+12 Laps
12	LMP2 (Pro-Am)	20	(Denmark) High Class Racing	(Denmark) Jan Magnussen (Denmark) Anders Fjordbach (Denmark) Dennis Andersen	Oreca 07	G	285	+15 Laps
12	LMP2 (Pro-Am)	20	(Denmark) High Class Racing	(Denmark) Jan Magnussen (Denmark) Anders Fjordbach (Denmark) Dennis Andersen	Gibson GK428 4.2 L V8	G	285	+15 Laps
13	LMP2 (Pro-Am)	29	(Netherlands) Racing Team Nederland	(Netherlands) Frits van Eerd (Netherlands) Giedo van der Garde (Netherlands) Job van Uitert	Oreca 07	G	280	+20 Laps
13	LMP2 (Pro-Am)	29	(Netherlands) Racing Team Nederland	(Netherlands) Frits van Eerd (Netherlands) Giedo van der Garde (Netherlands) Job van Uitert	Gibson GK428 4.2 L V8	G	280	+20 Laps
**14**	**LMGTE Pro**	**51**	**(Italy) AF Corse**	**(Italy) Alessandro Pier Guidi** **(United Kingdom) James Calado**	**Ferrari 488 GTE Evo**	M	**279**	**+21 Laps** ‡
**14**	**LMGTE Pro**	**51**	**(Italy) AF Corse**	**(Italy) Alessandro Pier Guidi** **(United Kingdom) James Calado**	**Ferrari F154CB 3.9 L Turbo V8**	M	**279**	**+21 Laps** ‡
15	LMGTE Pro	52	(Italy) AF Corse	(Brazil) Daniel Serra (Spain) Miguel Molina	Ferrari 488 GTE Evo	M	279	+21 Laps
15	LMGTE Pro	52	(Italy) AF Corse	(Brazil) Daniel Serra (Spain) Miguel Molina	Ferrari F154CB 3.9 L Turbo V8	M	279	+21 Laps
16	LMGTE Pro	92	(Germany) Porsche GT Team	(France) Kévin Estre (Switzerland) Neel Jani (Denmark) Michael Christensen	Porsche 911 RSR-19	M	279	+21 Laps
16	LMGTE Pro	92	(Germany) Porsche GT Team	(France) Kévin Estre (Switzerland) Neel Jani (Denmark) Michael Christensen	Porsche 4.2 L Flat-6	M	279	+21 Laps
17	LMGTE Pro	91	(Germany) Porsche GT Team	(Italy) Gianmaria Bruni (Austria) Richard Lietz (France) Frédéric Makowiecki	Porsche 911 RSR-19	M	278	+22 Laps
17	LMGTE Pro	91	(Germany) Porsche GT Team	(Italy) Gianmaria Bruni (Austria) Richard Lietz (France) Frédéric Makowiecki	Porsche 4.2 L Flat-6	M	278	+22 Laps
**18**	**LMGTE Am**	**47**	**(Italy) Cetilar Racing**	**(Italy) Roberto Lacorte** **(Italy) Giorgio Sernagiotto** **(Italy) Antonio Fuoco**	**Ferrari 488 GTE Evo**	M	**274**	**+26 Laps** ‡
**18**	**LMGTE Am**	**47**	**(Italy) Cetilar Racing**	**(Italy) Roberto Lacorte** **(Italy) Giorgio Sernagiotto** **(Italy) Antonio Fuoco**	**Ferrari F154CB 3.9 L Turbo V8**	M	**274**	**+26 Laps** ‡
19	LMGTE Am	56	(Germany) Team Project 1	(Italy) Matteo Cairoli (Norway) Egidio Perfetti (Italy) Riccardo Pera	Porsche 911 RSR-19	M	274	+26 Laps
19	LMGTE Am	56	(Germany) Team Project 1	(Italy) Matteo Cairoli (Norway) Egidio Perfetti (Italy) Riccardo Pera	Porsche 4.2 L Flat-6	M	274	+26 Laps
20	LMGTE Am	54	(Italy) AF Corse	(Switzerland) Thomas Flohr (Italy) Francesco Castellacci (Italy) Giancarlo Fisichella	Ferrari 488 GTE Evo	M	274	+26 Laps
20	LMGTE Am	54	(Italy) AF Corse	(Switzerland) Thomas Flohr (Italy) Francesco Castellacci (Italy) Giancarlo Fisichella	Ferrari F154CB 3.9 L Turbo V8	M	274	+26 Laps
21	LMGTE Am	98	(United Kingdom) Aston Martin Racing	(Canada) Paul Dalla Lana (Brazil) Augusto Farfus (Brazil) Marcos Gomes	Aston Martin Vantage AMR	M	274	+26 Laps
21	LMGTE Am	98	(United Kingdom) Aston Martin Racing	(Canada) Paul Dalla Lana (Brazil) Augusto Farfus (Brazil) Marcos Gomes	Aston Martin 4.0 L Turbo V8	M	274	+26 Laps
22	LMGTE Am	57	(Switzerland) Kessel Racing	(Japan) Takeshi Kimura (Denmark) Mikkel Jensen (Australia) Scott Andrews	Ferrari 488 GTE Evo	M	274	+26 Laps
22	LMGTE Am	57	(Switzerland) Kessel Racing	(Japan) Takeshi Kimura (Denmark) Mikkel Jensen (Australia) Scott Andrews	Ferrari F154CB 3.9 L Turbo V8	M	274	+26 Laps
23	LMGTE Am	60	(Italy) Iron Lynx	(Italy) Claudio Schiavoni (Italy) Andrea Piccini (Italy) Matteo Cressoni	Ferrari 488 GTE Evo	M	273	+27 Laps
23	LMGTE Am	60	(Italy) Iron Lynx	(Italy) Claudio Schiavoni (Italy) Andrea Piccini (Italy) Matteo Cressoni	Ferrari F154CB 3.9 L Turbo V8	M	273	+27 Laps
24	LMGTE Am	85	(Italy) Iron Lynx	(Switzerland) Rahel Frey (Denmark) Michelle Gatting (Italy) Manuela Gostner	Ferrari 488 GTE Evo	M	273	+27 Laps
24	LMGTE Am	85	(Italy) Iron Lynx	(Switzerland) Rahel Frey (Denmark) Michelle Gatting (Italy) Manuela Gostner	Ferrari F154CB 3.9 L Turbo V8	M	273	+27 Laps
25	LMGTE Am	33	(United Kingdom) TF Sport	(United States) Ben Keating (Luxembourg) Dylan Pereira (Brazil) Felipe Fraga	Aston Martin Vantage AMR	M	272	+28 Laps
25	LMGTE Am	33	(United Kingdom) TF Sport	(United States) Ben Keating (Luxembourg) Dylan Pereira (Brazil) Felipe Fraga	Aston Martin 4.0 L Turbo V8	M	272	+28 Laps
26	LMGTE Am	86	(United Kingdom) GR Racing	(United Kingdom) Michael Wainwright (United Kingdom) Ben Barker (United Kingdom) Tom Gamble	Porsche 911 RSR-19	M	271	+29 Laps
26	LMGTE Am	86	(United Kingdom) GR Racing	(United Kingdom) Michael Wainwright (United Kingdom) Ben Barker (United Kingdom) Tom Gamble	Porsche 4.2 L Flat-6	M	271	+29 Laps
27	LMGTE Am	88	(Germany) Dempsey-Proton Racing	(United States) Dominique Bastien (Germany) Marco Seefried (France) Julien Andlauer	Porsche 911 RSR-19	M	269	+31 Laps
27	LMGTE Am	88	(Germany) Dempsey-Proton Racing	(United States) Dominique Bastien (Germany) Marco Seefried (France) Julien Andlauer	Porsche 4.2 L Flat-6	M	269	+31 Laps
28	LMGTE Am	83	(Italy) AF Corse	(France) François Perrodo (Denmark) Nicklas Nielsen (Italy) Alessio Rovera	Ferrari 488 GTE Evo	M	267	+33 Laps
28	LMGTE Am	83	(Italy) AF Corse	(France) François Perrodo (Denmark) Nicklas Nielsen (Italy) Alessio Rovera	Ferrari F154CB 3.9 L Turbo V8	M	267	+33 Laps
29	LMP2 (Pro-Am)	44	(Slovakia) ARC Bratislava	(Slovakia) Miro Konôpka (United Kingdom) Oliver Webb (United Kingdom) Tom Jackson	Ligier JS P217	G	261	+39 Laps
29	LMP2 (Pro-Am)	44	(Slovakia) ARC Bratislava	(Slovakia) Miro Konôpka (United Kingdom) Oliver Webb (United Kingdom) Tom Jackson	Gibson GK428 4.2 L V8	G	261	+39 Laps
30	Hypercar	709	(United States) Glickenhaus Racing	(Australia) Ryan Briscoe (France) Romain Dumas (United Kingdom) Richard Westbrook	Glickenhaus 007 LMH	M	246	+54 Laps
30	Hypercar	709	(United States) Glickenhaus Racing	(Australia) Ryan Briscoe (France) Romain Dumas (United Kingdom) Richard Westbrook	Glickenhaus 3.5 L Turbo V8	M	246	+54 Laps
DNF	LMGTE Am	77	(Germany) Dempsey-Proton Racing	(Germany) Christian Ried (New Zealand) Jaxon Evans (Australia) Matt Campbell	Porsche 911 RSR-19	M	88	Retired
DNF	LMGTE Am	77	(Germany) Dempsey-Proton Racing	(Germany) Christian Ried (New Zealand) Jaxon Evans (Australia) Matt Campbell	Porsche 4.2 L Flat-6	M	88	Retired
DNF	LMGTE Am	777	(Japan) D'station Racing	(Japan) Satoshi Hoshino (Japan) Tomonobu Fujii (United Kingdom) Andrew Watson	Aston Martin Vantage AMR	M	69	Retired
DNF	LMGTE Am	777	(Japan) D'station Racing	(Japan) Satoshi Hoshino (Japan) Tomonobu Fujii (United Kingdom) Andrew Watson	Aston Martin 4.0 L Turbo V8	M	69	Retired

Tyre manufacturers
Key
Symbol	Tyre manufacturer
**G**	Goodyear
**M**	Michelin

== Standings after the race ==
2021 Hypercar World Endurance Drivers' Championship

Pos.	+/–	Driver	Points
1		(Switzerland) Sébastien Buemi (Japan) Kazuki Nakajima (New Zealand) Brendon Hartley	63
2	1	(United Kingdom) Mike Conway (Japan) Kamui Kobayashi (Argentina) José María López	43
3	1	(France) Nicolas Lapierre (Brazil) André Negrão (France) Matthieu Vaxivière	42
4	1	(Australia) Ryan Briscoe (France) Romain Dumas (United Kingdom) Richard Westbrook	18

2021 Hypercar World Endurance Championship

Pos.	+/–	Team	Points
1		(Japan) Toyota Gazoo Racing	64
2		(France) Alpine Elf Matmut	42
3		(United States) Glickenhaus Racing	1

- Note: Only the top five positions are included for the Drivers Championship standings.

2021 LMP2 World Endurance Drivers' Championship

Pos.	+/–	Driver	Points
1		(United Kingdom) Anthony Davidson (Portugal) António Félix da Costa (Mexico) Roberto González	56
2		(United Kingdom) Philip Hanson	49
3		(Indonesia) Sean Gelael (Belgium) Stoffel Vandoorne (United Kingdom) Tom Blomqvist	42
4		(Switzerland) Fabio Scherer (Portugal) Filipe Albuquerque	26
5		(United Kingdom) Alex Brundle (Poland) Jakub Śmiechowski	25

2021 LMP2 World Endurance Championship

Pos.	+/–	Team	Points
1		(United Kingdom) No. 38 JOTA	56
2		(United States) No. 22 United Autosports USA	49
3		(United Kingdom) No. 28 JOTA	43
4		(Poland) No. 34 Inter Europol Competition	25
5		(Belgium) No. 31 Team WRT	19

- Note: Only the top five positions are included for the Drivers Championship standings.

2021 World Endurance GTE Drivers' Championship

Pos.	+/–	Driver	Points
1	1	(United Kingdom) James Calado (Italy) Alessandro Pier Guidi	56
2	1	(France) Kévin Estre (Switzerland) Neel Jani	50
3		(Spain) Miguel Molina (Brazil) Daniel Serra	42
4		(Italy) Gianmaria Bruni (Austria) Richard Lietz	30
5		(Denmark) Michael Christensen	24

2021 World Endurance GTE Manufacturers' Championship

Pos.	+/–	Team	Points
1	1	(Italy) Ferrari	98
2	1	(Germany) Porsche	80

- Note: Only the top five positions are included for the Drivers Championship standings.
