= Algarve International Circuit =

Automobile race course in Portimão, Portugal

- Configuration for FIA sanctioned events

- Configuration for FIM sanctioned events
- Location: Portimão, Algarve, Portugal
- Coordinates: 37°13′55″N 8°37′55″W
- Capacity: 100,000
- FIA Grade: 1
- Broke ground: February 2008; 18 years ago
- Opened: 2 November 2008; 18 years ago
- Construction cost: €195 million
- Architect: Ricardo Pina
- Major events: Current: Grand Prix motorcycle racing Portuguese motorcycle Grand Prix (2020–present); Algarve motorcycle Grand Prix (2021); ELMS 4 Hours of Portimão (2009–2010, 2017–present); World SBK (2008–2015, 2017–present); GT World Challenge Europe (2014–2015, 2026); Ferrari Challenge Europe (2009–2011, 2013–2014, 2022, 2024, 2026); Porsche Cup Brasil (2012–2013, 2025–present); Future: Formula One; Portuguese Grand Prix (2020–2021, 2027–2028); Asian Le Mans Series (2027); Former: FIA WEC 6 Hours of Portimão (2021, 2023); TCR World Tour (2023); TCR Europe (2022–2023, 2025); DTM (2022); WTCC Race of Portugal (2010, 2012); FIM Endurance World Championship (2016); A1 Grand Prix (2009); FIA GT (2009)
- Website: https://autodromodoalgarve.com

Grand Prix Circuit (2008–present)
- Length: 4.653 km (2.891 mi)
- Turns: 15
- Race lap record: 1:18.750 ( (United Kingdom) Lewis Hamilton, Mercedes W11, 2020, F1)

Motorcycling Circuit (2008–present)
- Length: 4.592 km (2.853 mi)
- Turns: 15
- Race lap record: 1:38.237 ( (Spain) Pedro Acosta, KTM RC16, 2025, MotoGP)

GP Circuit with Chicane (2008–2019)
- Length: 4.684 km (2.911 mi)
- Turns: 16
- Race lap record: 1:32.113 ( (Brazil) Diego Nunes, Dallara GP2/08, 2009, GP2)

The Algarve International Circuit (Portuguese: Autódromo Internacional do Algarve), also known as the Portimão Circuit, is a 4.653 km (2.891 mi) race circuit located in Portimão, Algarve region, Portugal. The development includes a karting track, off-road track, technology park, five-star hotel, sports complex and apartments.

The circuit was designed by Ricardo Pina, Arquitectos. The construction was finished by 8 October 2008 and the circuit was homologated by both the FIM on 11 October 2008 and the FIA two days later, on 13 October. The total cost was €195 million (approximately $250 million). The circuit's official grand opening was held on 2 November of that year, as it hosted the final round of the 2008 Superbike World Championship.

== The circuit ==
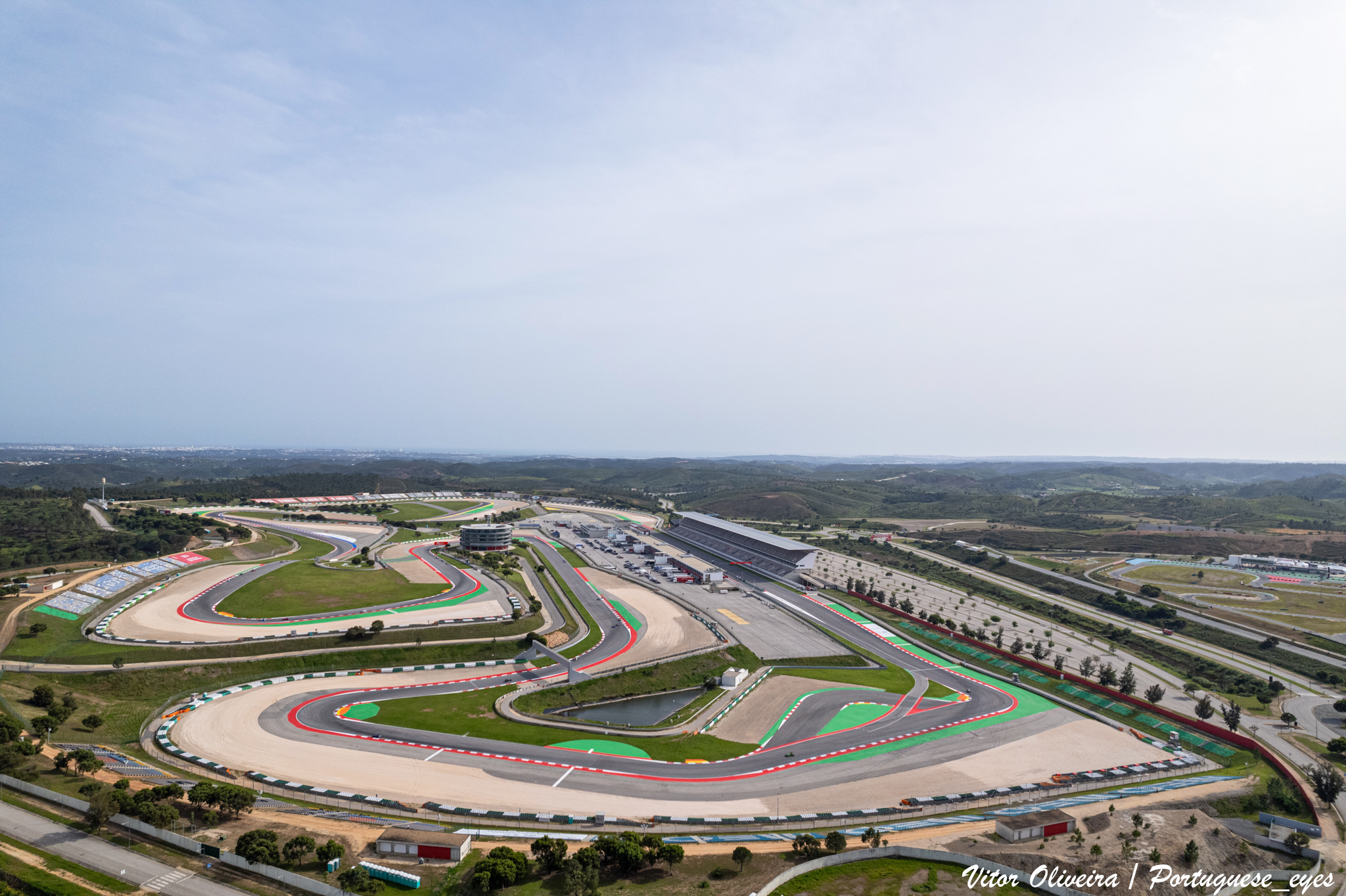
Aerial view

The circuit hosted the final round of the World Superbike Championship on 2 November 2008. On 9 June, the track was confirmed to host a round of the 2008-09 A1 Grand Prix season. The race was set for the weekend of 12 April 2009. On 10 October 2008, the Le Mans Series announced a 1000 km night race to be held at Algarve on 2 August 2009. On 5 November 2008, the FIA GT Championship announced that the 7th round of the 2009 season would be held at Algarve on 13 September 2009. A Formula One test session, with the McLaren and Honda teams participating, was scheduled for 15–17 December 2008. Ferrari also ran at Algarve. Toyota also tested at the circuit on 20 January 2009 in the first outing of their new TF109 chassis. The circuit also hosted the final round of the 2009 GP2 Series season in September 2009. From 2010 it hosted a round of the FIA World Touring Car Championship.

On 4 April 2009, Max Mosley stated that based on the quality of the circuit it could integrate the Formula One championship under the guise of the Portuguese Grand Prix, as long as a commercial agreement with the Formula One Management was achieved. Due to changes to the 2020 Formula One season as a result of the COVID-19 pandemic, the Algarve International Circuit has by way of exception hosted the 2020 Portuguese Grand Prix.

The circuit resembles old Nürburgring and Spa-Francorchamps, mainly because of its constantly undulating nature. A1 Team Portugal's driver Filipe Albuquerque observed that there are big downhill slopes and right-hand turns after the main straight. He also commented that the track is good for overtaking because of the circuit width. A1 Team New Zealand's driver Earl Bamber observed that there are many special turns with personality. He commented that the new circuit is a little bit dangerous like the old school circuits with a roller coaster ride. A1 Team France's driver Nicolas Prost commented that the asphalt was new and the circuit has little grip.

The first episode of The Grand Tour, "The Holy Trinity" was shot here in 2016.

At the 2022 Supersport 300 World Championship, Victor Steeman died causing fatal accident at this circuit while racing in the Race 1 Portimão round.

== After COVID-19 pandemic ==
In July 2020 it was announced that the circuit would host the Formula One Portuguese Grand Prix from 23 to 25 October, as part of a revised calendar arising from the disruption caused by the COVID-19 pandemic. This marked the first time a Portuguese Grand Prix had been held since the 1996 race, which had taken place at the Autódromo do Estoril. The circuit hosted the Portuguese Grand Prix again in 2021 from 30 April to 2 May.

In August 2020 it was announced that the circuit would host the MotoGP Portuguese motorcycle Grand Prix from 20 to 22 November, as part of a revised calendar arising from the disruption caused by the COVID-19 pandemic. On 10 August 2020, MotoGP announced that the coronavirus-hit season would end with the Portuguese Grand Prix in Portimão. The circuit hosted the Portuguese motorcycle Grand Prix again in 2021 from 16 to 18 April, and hosted a second event named the Algarve Grand Prix from 5 to 7 November.

In January 2021 it was announced that the circuit would host the FIA World Endurance Championship 8 Hours of Portimão instead of 1000 Miles of Sebring on 4 April due to the disruption caused by the COVID-19 pandemic. However, on 5 March 2021; the round was postponed into the original date of 2021 24 Hours of Le Mans, 13 June in order to increase the possibility of fans being able to attend the race.

For 2022, it was planned that the circuit would not host F1 and WEC races, but it would continue to host MotoGP, World SBK, and ELMS races. Besides them, it hosted DTM, TCR Europe and Lamborghini Super Trofeo World Final for the first time in 2022. In September 2022, it was announced that the circuit returned to the 2023 WEC calendar.

In December 2025, it was announced that the circuit would return in 2027 and 2028 hosting the Portuguese Grand Prix, the circuit's first time on the Formula One calendar since 2021, replacing the Dutch Grand Prix at Circuit Zandvoort.

== Craig Jones memorial ==
The circuit is the site of a statue in tribute to Craig Jones, representing Jones on his motorbike after passing the finishing line. This statue will be the main part of a monument, already partially built, which also includes the architectural arrangement of the main access roundabout to the racetrack, created by Paula Hespanha and Portuguese architect Manuel Pedro Ferreira Chaves. This monument is a landscape sculpture, representing the main straight of a racing circuit, which extends up to the car park of the main grandstand. It has been confirmed that one of the corners of the circuit was named after former World Supersport rider Craig Jones who was killed in a motorcycle crash at Brands Hatch in 2008.

== Layout configurations ==
Algarve International Circuit layout configurations
Grand Prix Circuit with Chicane (2008–2019)

Grand Prix Circuit (2008–present)

Motorcycling Circuit (2008–present)

== Events ==
Current

- January: GT Winter Series, GT4 Winter Series, Porsche Sprint Challenge Southern Europe
- February: Formula Winter Series, Eurocup-3 Spanish Winter Championship, Eurocup-4 Spanish Winter Championship, Ultimate Winter Cup, 6h of Portimão
- March: Superbike World Championship, Supersport World Championship, FIM Women's Motorcycling World Championship, Sportbike World Championship
- May: Supercars Endurance Series Algarve Iberian Racing Festival, Campeonato Portugal de Velocidade
- June: Eurocup-3, F4 Spanish Championship
- July: Ferrari Challenge Europe, Porsche Cup Brasil
- October: European Le Mans Series 4 Hours of Portimão, GT World Challenge Europe, Le Mans Cup, GT2 European Series, GT4 European Series, Ligier European Series, McLaren Trophy Europe, Fun Cup
- November: Grand Prix motorcycle racing Portuguese motorcycle Grand Prix, Ultimate Cup Series, Algarve Classic Festival

Future

- Asian Le Mans Cup (2027)
- Asian Le Mans Series
  - 4 Hours of Portimão (2027)
- Formula One
  - Portuguese Grand Prix (2020–2021, 2027–2028)
- Formula Regional European Championship (2027)
- Harley-Davidson Bagger World Cup (2027)
- Porsche Carrera Cup Benelux (2027)
- Porsche Supercup (2027)

Former

- 24H Series
  - 24 Hours of Portimão (2017–2020, 2022, 2024)
- A1 Grand Prix (2009)
- Acceleration 2014 (2014)
- Alpine Elf Cup Series (2020–2021, 2024)
- Auto GP (2009, 2012)
- British Formula 3 International Series (2009)
- British GT Championship (2023)
- Deutsche Tourenwagen Masters (2022)
- EuroBOSS Series (2009)
- FIA Formula 3 European Championship (2015)
- FIA Formula Two Championship (2010, 2012)
- FIA GT Championship
  - Algarve 2 Hours (2009)
- FIA GT1 World Championship (2010–2012)
- FIA GT3 European Championship (2009–2012)
- FIA World Endurance Championship
  - 6 Hours of Portimão (2023)
  - 8 Hours of Portimão (2021)
- FIM Endurance World Championship
  - 12 Hours of Portimão (2016)
- FIM JuniorGP World Championship (2014–2016, 2020–2024)
- FIM Moto2 European Championship (2014–2016, 2020–2024)
- Formula Le Mans Cup (2009)
- Formula Renault 2.0 West European Cup (2009)
- Formula Renault 3.5 Series (2009)
- GP2 Series
  - Algarve GP2 Series round (2009)
- Grand Prix motorcycle racing
  - Algarve motorcycle Grand Prix (2021)
- International GTSprint Series (2010–2011, 2013)
- Lamborghini Super Trofeo World Final (2022)
- MotoE World Championship
  - Portuguese eRace (2024–2025)
- Porsche Carrera Cup France (2021, 2024)
- Prototype Winter Series (2024–2025)
- Radical World Finals (2023)
- Renault Clio Cup Europe (2024)
- Superleague Formula
  - Superleague Formula round Portugal (2010)
- Supersport 300 World Championship (2017–2025)
- Superstars Series (2009–2011, 2013)
- TCR Europe Touring Car Series (2022–2023, 2025)
- TCR International Series (2015)
- TCR World Tour (2023)
- V de V Sports (2017)
- World Touring Car Championship
  - FIA WTCC Race of Portugal (2010, 2012)

== Lap records ==
As of April 2026, the fastest official race lap records at the Algarve International Circuit are listed as:

Category	Time	Driver/Rider	Vehicle	Event
Grand Prix Circuit (2008–present): 4.653 km (2.891 mi)
F1	1:18.750	Lewis Hamilton	Mercedes-AMG F1 W11 EQ Performance	2020 Portuguese Grand Prix
LMP2	1:29.670	Mikkel Jensen	Aurus 01	2020 4 Hours of Portimão
LMP1	1:30.919	Nicolas Lapierre	Alpine A480	2021 8 Hours of Portimão
LMH	1:31.006	Kazuki Nakajima	Toyota GR010 Hybrid	2021 8 Hours of Portimão
A1GP	1:31.404	Adam Carroll	A1GP Powered by Ferrari car	2009 Portimão A1GP round
Superleague Formula	1:31.935	Andy Soucek	Panoz DP09	2010 Portimão Superleague Formula round
LMDh	1:33.077	Earl Bamber	Cadillac V-Series.R	2023 6 Hours of Portimão
Formula 3000	1:33.594	Clivio Piccione	Lola B05/52	2009 Portimão Euroseries 3000 round
FA1	1:33.808	Mirko Bortolotti	Lola B05/52	2014 Portimão Formula Acceleration 1 round
Formula Renault 3.5	1:34.472	Jaime Alguersuari	Dallara T08	2009 Portimão Formula Renault 3.5 Series round
F2 (2009–2012)	1:35.531	Mathéo Tuscher	Williams JPH1B	2012 Portimão Formula Two round
Eurocup-3	1:36.102	Keanu Al Azhari	Dallara 326	2026 Portimão Eurocup-3 Spanish Winter Championship round
Euroformula Open	1:36.151	Rui-Heng Yeh	Dallara 324	2026 Portimão Euroformula Open round
LMP3	1:36.881	Matt Bell	Ligier JS P320	2020 Portimão Le Mans Cup round
LM GTE	1:38.757	Miguel Molina	Ferrari 488 GTE Evo	2021 8 Hours of Portimão
Formula Three	1:38.904	Jules Bianchi	Dallara F309	2009 Portimão British F3 round
Formula Regional	1:39.696	Valerio Rinicella	Tatuus F3 T-318-EC3	2025 Portimão E3 Spanish Winter Championship round
LMPC	1:40.048	Jérôme d'Ambrosio	Oreca FLM09	2009 Algarve Formula Le Mans Cup round
GT3	1:40.795	Julien Andlauer	Porsche 911 (991 II) GT3 R	2020 Portimão Le Mans Cup round
GT1 (GTS)	1:41.828	Alex Müller	Maserati MC12 GT1	2009 FIA GT Algarve 2 Hours
Lamborghini Super Trofeo	1:42.790	Loris Spinelli	Lamborghini Huracán Super Trofeo Evo2	2022 Lamborghini Super Trofeo World Final
Ferrari Challenge	1:42.997	Luca Ludwig	Ferrari 296 Challenge	2024 Portimão Ferrari Challenge Europe round
SRO GT2	1:43.875	Pierre Kaffer	Audi R8 LMS GT2	2023 Portimão GT2 European Series round
Formula 4	1:43.894	Noam Abramczyk	Tatuus F4-T014	2021 Portimão F4 Spain round
Porsche Carrera Cup	1:44.582	Robert de Haan	Porsche 911 (992 I) GT3 Cup	2023 Portimão Porsche Sprint Challenge Southern Europe round
Radical Cup	1:45.145	Indy Al Miller	Radical SR10 XXR	2023 Radical World Finals
JS P4	1:45.462	Gillian Henrion	Ligier JS P4	2022 Portimão Ligier European Series round
GT2	1:47.198	Martin Ragginger	Porsche 911 (997 I) GT3-RSR	2009 FIA GT Algarve 2 Hours
GT4	1:49.932	Jamie Day	Aston Martin Vantage GT4	2024 Portimão GT4 Winter Series round
JS2 R	1:51.490	Natan Bihel	Ligier JS2 R	2020 Portimão Ligier European Series round
Alpine Elf Europa Cup	1:51.868	Ugo de Wilde	Alpine A110 Cup	2021 Portimão Alpine Elf Europa Cup round
TCR Touring Car	1:52.042	Eric Gené	CUPRA León VZ TCR	2025 Portimão TCR Europe round
Super 2000	1:54.542	Yvan Muller	Chevrolet Cruze 1.6T	2012 FIA WTCC Race of Portugal
Pickup truck racing	1:57.396	Elon Murray	MWV6 Pick Up	2014 Portimão MW-V6 Pickup Series round
Renault Clio Cup	2.04.323	Adrian Schimpf	Renault Clio R.S. V	2024 Portimão Renault Clio Cup Europe round
Toyota GR Cup	2:08.176	Daniel Losada	Toyota GR86	2025 Portimão Toyota GR Cup Spain round
Motorcycling Circuit (2008–present): 4.592 km (2.853 mi)
MotoGP	1:38.237	Pedro Acosta	KTM RC16	2025 Portuguese motorcycle Grand Prix
World SBK	1:39.107	Nicolò Bulega	Ducati Panigale V4 R	2026 Portimão World SBK round
Moto2	1:41.225	Collin Veijer	Kalex Moto2	2025 Portuguese motorcycle Grand Prix
World SSP	1:42.909	Can Öncü	Yamaha YZF-R9	2025 Portimão World SSP round
MotoE	1:46.313	Oscar Gutiérrez	Ducati V21L	2024 Portuguese motorcycle Grand Prix
Moto3	1:46.881	David Almansa	Honda NSF250RW	2025 Portuguese motorcycle Grand Prix
World SPB	1:48.400	Matteo Vannucci	Aprilia RS 660 Factory	2026 Portimão World SPB round
World WCR	1:52.637	Beatriz Neila	Yamaha YZF-R7	2026 Portimão World WCR round
Supersport 300	1:54.414	David Salvador	Kawasaki Ninja 400	2025 Portimão Supersport 300 round
Grand Prix Circuit with Chicane (2008–2019): 4.684 km (2.911 mi)
GP2	1:32.113	Diego Nunes	Dallara GP2/08	2009 Algarve GP2 Series round
Formula Three	1:42.077	Felix Rosenqvist	Dallara F315	2015 Portimão F3 Europe round
Formula Renault 2.0	1:45.648	Albert Costa	Tatuus FR2000	2009 Portimão Formula Renault 2.0 West European Cup round
