= FIA World Endurance Championship =

Auto racing championship held worldwide

- Category: Endurance racing
- Country: International
- Region: Worldwide
- Inaugural season: 2012
- Prototype classes: Hypercar
- GT classes: LMGT3
- Teams: 15
- Constructors: Hypercar: Aston Martin • BMW • Cadillac • Ferrari • Ford • Genesis • McLaren • Peugeot • Toyota LMGT3: Aston Martin • BMW • Chevrolet • Ferrari • Ford • Toyota • McLaren • Mercedes • Porsche
- Chassis manufacturers: Hypercar: Dallara • Multimatic • Oreca
- Tyre suppliers: Michelin, Goodyear
- Drivers' champion: Hypercar: (Switzerland) Sébastien Buemi; (New Zealand) Brendon Hartley; (Japan) Ryo Hirakawa; LMGT3: (United Kingdom) Jonny Edgar
- Makes' champion: Hypercar: (Japan) Toyota
- Teams' champion: LMGT3: (United Kingdom) TF Sport
- Official website: fiawec.com

The FIA World Endurance Championship, abbreviated as WEC, is a world championship for automobile endurance racing organized by the Automobile Club de l'Ouest (ACO) and sanctioned by the Fédération Internationale de l'Automobile (FIA). The series supersedes the ACO's former Intercontinental Le Mans Cup which began in 2010 and is the revival of the World Sportscar Championship which ended after the 1992 season. The World Endurance Championship name was previously used by the FIA from 1981 to 1985.

The series features multiple classes of cars competing in endurance races, with sports prototypes competing in the Hypercar class (LMH or LMDh), and production-based grand tourers (GT cars) competing in the LM GT3 category. World champion titles are awarded to the top-scoring drivers and manufacturers over the season, while other cups and trophies will be awarded for drivers and private teams.

Contemporary drivers have described World Endurance Championship races as featuring highly competitive, closely contested on-track racing throughout the duration of the event, with sustained overtaking and aggressive racing at all stages of a race.

== History ==
The World Endurance Championship was first run in 2012 as a replacement for the Intercontinental Le Mans Cup, following much of the same format and featuring eight endurance races across the world, including the 24 Hours of Le Mans. There were four categories: LMP1 and LMP2 prototypes along with GTE grand tourers, divided into GTE Pro for teams with professional driver line-ups, and GTE Am for teams featuring a mixture of amateur drivers.

Faced with declining manufacturer interest in the LMP1 class after the 2017 season, the FIA commissioned a study into the future regulations of the championship's top category. Known as the Le Mans Hypercar (LMH), the proposal called for a move away from Le Mans Prototype entries and less reliance on hybrid technologies. The proposal was designed to make the championship more appealing to car manufacturers, and cited flagship models such as the Aston Martin Vulcan and McLaren Senna GTR as examples of the cars the new regulations were hoping to attract. The Hypercar class first appeared in the 2021 season, with LMH entries from Alpine, Glickenhaus and Toyota. From 2023, LMDh entries will also be able to compete full-time in the Hypercar class alongside LMH.

In 2021, the ACO announced that the series would move away from its two LMGTE categories, following a rapid decline in manufacturer interest. The 2022 season will be the last for the LMGTE Pro class, and from 2024, LMGTE Am will be replaced by a GT3-based category, described as a "GT3 Premium" featuring a cost-capped body kit conversion from standard GT3 machinery. According to the president of the FIA Endurance Commission Richard Mille, the FIA are aiming at a customer-focused category where the manufacturers cannot enter officially.

2024 marked the first season in the series' history that the LMP2 class would not feature on the grid, due to increased demand in full-season entries for Hypercar and the incoming LMGT3 class. The category remained a stronghold of the 24 Hours of Le Mans, with a minimum 15 slots reserved on the grid.

== Format ==
Four titles are to be decided and awarded in the current season (as of 2026) based on total point tally, with two being deemed world championships: Hypercar World Endurance Drivers' Championship and Hypercar World Endurance Manufacturers' Championship. The points system is similar to that used in the FIA's other world championships, awarding points to the top ten finishers on a sliding point margin scale from first to tenth. Cars finishing the race but classified eleventh or further are awarded a half point. For 8 and 10-hour races, points are worth roughly 1.5x as much (i.e. 25 points for a win is worth 38 points at these races). For the 24 Hours of Le Mans, points are worth roughly 2x as much.

== Races ==
=== Current races (2026) ===
Race	Circuit	Seasons
6 Hours of Imola	(Italy) Autodromo Enzo e Dino Ferrari	2024–present
6 Heures de Spa-Francorchamps	(Belgium) Circuit de Spa-Francorchamps	2012–present
24 Hours of Le Mans	(France) Circuit de la Sarthe	2012–present
6 Hours of São Paulo	(Brazil) Interlagos Circuit	2012–2014, 2024–present
Lone Star Le Mans	(United States) Circuit of the Americas	2013–2017, 2020, 2024–present
6 Hours of Fuji	(Japan) Fuji Speedway	2012–2019, 2022–present
6 Hours of Barcelona	(Spain) Circuit de Barcelona-Catalunya	2026
6 Hours of Monza	(Italy) Autodromo Nazionale di Monza	2021–2023, 2026

=== Returning races (2027) ===
Race	Circuit	Seasons
Qatar 1812 km	(Qatar) Lusail International Circuit	2024–2025, 2027
6 Hours of Silverstone	(United Kingdom) Silverstone Circuit	2012–2019, 2027
8 Hours of Bahrain	Bahrain International Circuit	2012–2017, 2019–2025, 2027 (2 races in 2021)

=== Former races ===
Race	Circuit	Seasons
4 Hours of Shanghai	(China) Shanghai International Circuit	2012–2019
6 Hours of Mexico	(Mexico) Autódromo Hermanos Rodríguez	2016–2017
6 Hours of Nürburgring	(Germany) Nürburgring	2015–2017
6 Hours of Portimão	(Portugal) Algarve International Circuit	2021, 2023
1000 Miles of Sebring	(United States) Sebring International Raceway	2019, 2022–2023
12 Hours of Sebring	(United States) Sebring International Raceway	2012

== See also ==
- IMSA SportsCar Championship
- European Le Mans Series
- Asian Le Mans Series
- World Sportscar Championship
- FIA GT1 World Championship
