= 1000 Miles of Sebring =

Endurance car race at the Sebring International Raceway, Florida

1,000 Miles of Sebring

FIA World Endurance Championship
- Venue: Sebring International Raceway
- First race: 2019
- First FIA WEC race: 2019
- Last race: 2023
- Distance: 1,002.32 mi (1,613.078 km)
- Laps: 268
- Duration: 8 Hour time limit
- Most wins (driver): 9 drivers tied (1)
- Most wins (team): Toyota Gazoo Racing (2)
- Most wins (manufacturer): Toyota (2)

The 1,000 Miles of Sebring was a sports car race that was held at the Sebring International Raceway, on the site of the former Hendricks Army Airfield World War II Air Base, in Sebring, Florida, United States. It was created for the FIA World Endurance Championship, and was held for the first time on 15 March 2019 as the sixth round of the 2018–19 FIA World Endurance Championship.

== History ==
The FIA/ACO announced a provisional schedule on 1 September 2017 that shifted the FIA World Endurance Championship calendar from a spring to autumn layout with the 24 Hours of Le Mans marque event held in the middle of the championship, and include two runnings of Le Mans. This "super season" of eight races spanned more than a year instead of the usual eight months. The shift allowed the following 2019–20 season to return to a shorter length by starting in the autumn and concluding at Le Mans in the summer. The Provisional Calendar saw a raft of changes, with several races dropped, but included a return to Sebring for the first time since 2012. In the provisional calendar issued, the race was originally planned to be run as a second 12-hour race after the IMSA Mobil 1 12 Hours of Sebring on the same weekend, and would start at midnight after the conclusion of the IMSA 12 hours. On 21 September 2017, the race became known as the 1,500 Miles of Sebring, to avoid confusion between the 2 events, at the FIA World Motor Sport Council meeting in Paris. On 4 April 2018, it was announced that the race would become shortened to 1,000 Miles or 268 laps, have a time limit of 8 Hours, and would take place on 15 March instead, prior to the start of the 12 Hours of Sebring, rather than after the race. A new pit lane, on Ullman Straight before the finishing turn, would also be built for the race.

The second race, originally scheduled for 20 March 2020, was cancelled as a result of the COVID-19 pandemic. On 11 March, minutes after Donovan Mitchell and Rudy Gobert returned a positive coronavirus test, causing the NBA to cancel the Utah Jazz at Oklahoma City Thunder match, the United States Department of State announced a suspension of travel by non-US citizens from Europe to the United States. Many of the drivers and team personnel were in Europe, and thus would be unable to travel to the United States for the race. The next day, the WEC announced the cancellation of the race. The 2020 race was also planned to include a time change in the schedule. Previously, the race had run from 4 p.m. to midnight, with the short duration between the 1,000 Mile race and 12 Hour race causing challenges for track and support personnel as well as drivers competing in both races. The change, which had the 1,000 Mile race scheduled from 12 p.m. to 8 p.m., ensured a 15-hour break between the WEC race and the 12 Hours of Sebring the following day. The race was again not held in 2021 as European restrictions were still in effect.

It was held in 2022 and 2023 when the contract between ACO and Sebring ended. The reformulation of the calendar with the introduction of new tracks and mainly the prologue and first round at Qatar, made difficult to keep Sebring in the calendar in its traditional date and the US round was replaced by COTA in Austin.

== Winners ==
Year	Drivers	Team	Car	Tyre	Time	Laps	Distance	Championship	Report	Ref
2019	(Switzerland) Sébastien Buemi (Spain) Fernando Alonso (Japan) Kazuki Nakajima	(Japan) Toyota Gazoo Racing	Toyota TS050 Hybrid	MI	8:00:38.186	253	946.23 miles (1522.807 km)	FIA World Endurance Championship	Report	
2020	Races cancelled due to COVID-19 pandemic									
2021	Races cancelled due to COVID-19 pandemic									
2022	(Brazil) André Negrão (France) Nicolas Lapierre (France) Matthieu Vaxivière	(France) Alpine Elf Team	Alpine A480	MI	7:15:37.293	194	725.56 miles (1167.67 km)	FIA World Endurance Championship	Report	
2023	(United Kingdom) Mike Conway (Japan) Kamui Kobayashi (Argentina) José María López	(Japan) Toyota Gazoo Racing	Toyota GR010 Hybrid	MI	8:00:19.877	239	893.24 miles (1437.53 km)	FIA World Endurance Championship	Report	
