= 2021 6 Hours of Bahrain =

Sports car endurance race held at Bahrain International Circuit, Sakhir, Bahrain

Coordinates: 26°1′57″N 50°30′38″E

Event information
- Round 5 of 6 in the 2021 FIA World Endurance Championship
- Date: 30 October 2021
- Location: Sakhir
- Venue: Bahrain International Circuit
- Duration: 6 Hours

Results
- Laps completed: 185
- Distance (km): 1001.22
- Distance (miles): 622.155
- Hypercar

Pole position
- Time: 1:47.049
- Team: (Japan) Toyota Gazoo Racing

Winners
- Team: (Japan) Toyota Gazoo Racing
- Drivers: (United Kingdom) Mike Conway (Japan) Kamui Kobayashi (Argentina) José María López
- LMP2

Winners
- Team: (Belgium) Team WRT
- Drivers: (Netherlands) Robin Frijns (Austria) Ferdinand Habsburg (France) Charles Milesi
- LMP2 Pro-Am

Winners
- Team: (Netherlands) Racing Team Nederland
- Drivers: (Netherlands) Frits van Eerd (Netherlands) Giedo van der Garde (Netherlands) Job van Uitert
- LMGTE Pro

Winners
- Team: (Germany) Porsche GT Team
- Drivers: (France) Kévin Estre (Switzerland) Neel Jani
- LMGTE Am

Winners
- Team: (United Kingdom) TF Sport
- Drivers: (United States) Ben Keating (Luxembourg) Dylan Pereira (Brazil) Felipe Fraga

The 2021 Bapco 6 Hours of Bahrain was an endurance sports car racing event held at the Bahrain International Circuit, Sakhir, Bahrain, on 30 October 2021. It served as the fifth and penultimate round of the 2021 FIA World Endurance Championship, and was the ninth running of the event as part of the championship. This race was a replacement for the cancelled race at Fuji Speedway, creating the first double-header in the championship's history, with the 8 Hours of Bahrain being run on 6 November 2021. The race was won by the Toyota GR010 Hybrid of Mike Conway, Kamui Kobayashi and José María López.

== Qualifying ==
=== Qualifying Results ===
Pole position winners in each class are marked in bold.

Pos.	Class	No.	Team	Time	Gap	Grid
1	**Hypercar**	**8**	**(Japan) Toyota Gazoo Racing**	**1:47.049**	-	**1**
2	Hypercar	7	(Japan) Toyota Gazoo Racing	1:47.447	+0.398	2
3	Hypercar	36	(France) Alpine Elf Matmut	1:48.003	+0.954	3
4	**LMP2**	**28**	**(United Kingdom) JOTA**	**1:49.932**	**+2.883**	**4**
5	LMP2	22	(United States) United Autosports USA	1:49.994	+2.945	5
6	LMP2	38	(United Kingdom) JOTA	1:50.198	+3.149	6
7	**LMP2 Pro-Am**	**70**	**(Switzerland) Realteam Racing**	**1:50.559**	**+3.510**	**7**
8	LMP2	34	(Poland) Inter Europol Competition	1:50.658	+3.609	8
9	LMP2 Pro-Am	29	(Netherlands) Racing Team Nederland	1:50.942	+3.893	9
10	LMP2	31	(Belgium) Team WRT	1:51.043	+3.994	10
11	LMP2 Pro-Am	21	(United States) DragonSpeed USA	1:51.312	+4.263	11
12	LMP2 Pro-Am	44	(Slovakia) ARC Bratislava	1:51.487	+4.438	12
13	LMP2 Pro-Am	20	(Denmark) High Class Racing	1:51.506	+4.457	13
14	LMP2	1	(France) Richard Mille Racing Team	1:51.736	+4.687	14
15	**LMGTE Pro**	**92**	**(Germany) Porsche GT Team**	**1:56.144**	**+9.095**	**15**
16	LMGTE Pro	91	(Germany) Porsche GT Team	1:56.178	+9.129	16
17	LMGTE Pro	52	(Italy) AF Corse	1:57.327	+10.278	17
18	LMGTE Pro	51	(Italy) AF Corse	1:57.573	+10.524	18
19	**LMGTE Am**	**60**	**(Italy) Iron Lynx**	**1:58.687**	**+11.638**	**19**
20	LMGTE Am	98	(United Kingdom) Aston Martin Racing	1:59.331	+12.282	20
21	LMGTE Am	56	(Germany) Team Project 1	1:59.404	+12.355	21
22	LMGTE Am	47	(Italy) Cetilar Racing	1:59.410	+12.361	22
23	LMGTE Am	54	(Italy) AF Corse	1:59.534	+12.485	23
24	LMGTE Am	33	(United Kingdom) TF Sport	1:59.538	+12.489	24
25	LMGTE Am	88	(Germany) Dempsey-Proton Racing	1:59.923	+12.874	25
26	LMGTE Am	83	(Italy) AF Corse	2:00.263	+13.214	26
27	LMGTE Am	77	(Germany) Dempsey-Proton Racing	2:00.294	+13.245	27
28	LMGTE Am	777	(Japan) D'Station Racing	2:00.300	+13.251	28
29	LMGTE Am	85	(Italy) Iron Lynx	2:00.457	+13.408	29
30	LMGTE Am	86	(United Kingdom) GR Racing	2:00.939	+13.890	30
31	LMGTE Am	57	(Switzerland) Kessel Racing	2:01.877	+14.828	31

== Race ==
=== Race Result ===
The minimum number of laps for classification (70% of the overall winning car's distance) was 129 laps. Class winners are denoted in bold and ‡.

Pos.	Class	No.	Team	Drivers	Chassis	Tyre	Laps	Time/Retired
Pos.	Class	No.	Team	Drivers	Engine	Tyre	Laps	Time/Retired
1	**Hypercar**	**7**	**(Japan) Toyota Gazoo Racing**	**(United Kingdom) Mike Conway** **(Japan) Kamui Kobayashi** **(Argentina) José María López**	**Toyota GR010 Hybrid**	MI	**185**	**6:00:33.356** ‡
1	**Hypercar**	**7**	**(Japan) Toyota Gazoo Racing**	**(United Kingdom) Mike Conway** **(Japan) Kamui Kobayashi** **(Argentina) José María López**	**Toyota 3.5 L Turbo V6**	MI	**185**	**6:00:33.356** ‡
2	Hypercar	8	(Japan) Toyota Gazoo Racing	(Switzerland) Sébastien Buemi (Japan) Kazuki Nakajima (New Zealand) Brendon Hartley	Toyota GR010 Hybrid	MI	185	+51.401
2	Hypercar	8	(Japan) Toyota Gazoo Racing	(Switzerland) Sébastien Buemi (Japan) Kazuki Nakajima (New Zealand) Brendon Hartley	Toyota 3.5 L Turbo V6	MI	185	+51.401
3	Hypercar	36	(France) Alpine Elf Matmut	(Brazil) André Negrão (France) Nicolas Lapierre (France) Matthieu Vaxivière	Alpine A480	MI	184	+1 lap
3	Hypercar	36	(France) Alpine Elf Matmut	(Brazil) André Negrão (France) Nicolas Lapierre (France) Matthieu Vaxivière	Gibson GL458 4.5 L V8	MI	184	+1 lap
4	**LMP2**	**31**	(Belgium) **Team WRT**	(Netherlands) **Robin Frijns** **(Austria) Ferdinand Habsburg** **(France) Charles Milesi**	**Oreca 07**	G	**180**	**+5 laps** ‡
4	**LMP2**	**31**	(Belgium) **Team WRT**	(Netherlands) **Robin Frijns** **(Austria) Ferdinand Habsburg** **(France) Charles Milesi**	**Gibson GK428 4.2 L V8**	G	**180**	**+5 laps** ‡
5	LMP2	28	(United Kingdom) JOTA	(Indonesia) Sean Gelael (Belgium) Stoffel Vandoorne (United Kingdom) Tom Blomqvist	Oreca 07	G	180	+5 laps
5	LMP2	28	(United Kingdom) JOTA	(Indonesia) Sean Gelael (Belgium) Stoffel Vandoorne (United Kingdom) Tom Blomqvist	Gibson GK428 4.2 L V8	G	180	+5 laps
6	LMP2	38	(United Kingdom) JOTA	(Mexico) Roberto González (Portugal) António Félix da Costa (United Kingdom) Anthony Davidson	Oreca 07	G	180	+5 laps
6	LMP2	38	(United Kingdom) JOTA	(Mexico) Roberto González (Portugal) António Félix da Costa (United Kingdom) Anthony Davidson	Gibson GK428 4.2 L V8	G	180	+5 laps
7	LMP2	22	(United Kingdom) United Autosports USA	(United Kingdom) Philip Hanson (Switzerland) Fabio Scherer (Portugal) Filipe Albuquerque	Oreca 07	G	180	+5 laps
7	LMP2	22	(United Kingdom) United Autosports USA	(United Kingdom) Philip Hanson (Switzerland) Fabio Scherer (Portugal) Filipe Albuquerque	Gibson GK428 4.2 L V8	G	180	+5 laps
8	**LMP2 Pro-Am**	**29**	**(Netherlands) Racing Team Nederland**	**(Netherlands) Frits van Eerd** **(Netherlands) Giedo van der Garde** **(Netherlands) Job van Uitert**	**Oreca 07**	G	**178**	**+7 laps** ‡
8	**LMP2 Pro-Am**	**29**	**(Netherlands) Racing Team Nederland**	**(Netherlands) Frits van Eerd** **(Netherlands) Giedo van der Garde** **(Netherlands) Job van Uitert**	**Gibson GK428 4.2 L V8**	G	**178**	**+7 laps** ‡
9	LMP2	1	(France) Richard Mille Racing Team	(Germany) Sophia Flörsch (Netherlands) Beitske Visser (France) Gabriel Aubry	Oreca 07	G	178	+7 laps
9	LMP2	1	(France) Richard Mille Racing Team	(Germany) Sophia Flörsch (Netherlands) Beitske Visser (France) Gabriel Aubry	Gibson GK428 4.2 L V8	G	178	+7 laps
10	LMP2 Pro-Am	70	(Switzerland) Realteam Racing	(Switzerland) Esteban Garcia (France) Loïc Duval (France) Norman Nato	Oreca 07	G	178	+7 laps
10	LMP2 Pro-Am	70	(Switzerland) Realteam Racing	(Switzerland) Esteban Garcia (France) Loïc Duval (France) Norman Nato	Gibson GK428 4.2 L V8	G	178	+7 laps
11	LMP2 Pro-Am	20	(Denmark) High Class Racing	(Denmark) Dennis Andersen (Denmark) Anders Fjordbach (Poland) Robert Kubica	Oreca 07	G	177	+8 laps
11	LMP2 Pro-Am	20	(Denmark) High Class Racing	(Denmark) Dennis Andersen (Denmark) Anders Fjordbach (Poland) Robert Kubica	Gibson GK428 4.2 L V8	G	177	+8 laps
12	LMP2	34	(Poland) Inter Europol Competition	(Poland) Jakub Śmiechowski (Netherlands) Renger van der Zande (United Kingdom) Alex Brundle	Oreca 07	G	175	+10 laps
12	LMP2	34	(Poland) Inter Europol Competition	(Poland) Jakub Śmiechowski (Netherlands) Renger van der Zande (United Kingdom) Alex Brundle	Gibson GK428 4.2 L V8	G	175	+10 laps
13	**LMGTE Pro**	**92**	**(Germany) Porsche GT Team**	**(France) Kévin Estre** **(Switzerland) Neel Jani**	**Porsche 911 RSR-19**	MI	**174**	**+11 laps** ‡
13	**LMGTE Pro**	**92**	**(Germany) Porsche GT Team**	**(France) Kévin Estre** **(Switzerland) Neel Jani**	**Porsche 4.2 L Flat-6**	MI	**174**	**+11 laps** ‡
14	LMGTE Pro	91	(Germany) Porsche GT Team	(Italy) Gianmaria Bruni (Austria) Richard Lietz	Porsche 911 RSR-19	MI	174	+11 laps
14	LMGTE Pro	91	(Germany) Porsche GT Team	(Italy) Gianmaria Bruni (Austria) Richard Lietz	Porsche 4.2 L Flat-6	MI	174	+11 laps
15	LMGTE Pro	51	(Italy) AF Corse	(Italy) Alessandro Pier Guidi (United Kingdom) James Calado	Ferari 488 GTE Evo	MI	174	+11 laps
15	LMGTE Pro	51	(Italy) AF Corse	(Italy) Alessandro Pier Guidi (United Kingdom) James Calado	Ferrari F154CB 3.9 L Turbo V8	MI	174	+11 laps
16	LMGTE Pro	52	(Italy) AF Corse	(Brazil) Daniel Serra (Spain) Miguel Molina	Ferari 488 GTE Evo	MI	174	+11 laps
16	LMGTE Pro	52	(Italy) AF Corse	(Brazil) Daniel Serra (Spain) Miguel Molina	Ferrari F154CB 3.9 L Turbo V8	MI	174	+11 laps
17	**LMGTE Am**	**33**	**(United Kingdom) TF Sport**	**(United States) Ben Keating** **(Luxembourg) Dylan Pereira** **(Brazil) Felipe Fraga**	**Aston Martin Vantage AMR**	MI	**172**	**+13 laps** ‡
17	**LMGTE Am**	**33**	**(United Kingdom) TF Sport**	**(United States) Ben Keating** **(Luxembourg) Dylan Pereira** **(Brazil) Felipe Fraga**	**Aston Martin 4.0 L Turbo V8**	MI	**172**	**+13 laps** ‡
18	LMGTE Am	77	(Germany) Dempsey-Proton Racing	(Germany) Christian Ried (New Zealand) Jaxon Evans (Australia) Matt Campbell	Porsche 911 RSR-19	MI	172	+13 laps
18	LMGTE Am	77	(Germany) Dempsey-Proton Racing	(Germany) Christian Ried (New Zealand) Jaxon Evans (Australia) Matt Campbell	Porsche 4.2 L Flat-6	MI	172	+13 laps
19	LMGTE Am	56	(Germany) Team Project 1	(Norway) Egidio Perfetti (Italy) Matteo Cairoli (Italy) Riccardo Pera	Porsche 911 RSR-19	MI	172	+13 laps
19	LMGTE Am	56	(Germany) Team Project 1	(Norway) Egidio Perfetti (Italy) Matteo Cairoli (Italy) Riccardo Pera	Porsche 4.2 L Flat-6	MI	172	+13 laps
20	LMGTE Am	98	(United Kingdom) Aston Martin Racing	(Canada) Paul Dalla Lana (Brazil) Augusto Farfus (Brazil) Marcos Gomes	Aston Martin Vantage AMR	MI	172	+13 laps
20	LMGTE Am	98	(United Kingdom) Aston Martin Racing	(Canada) Paul Dalla Lana (Brazil) Augusto Farfus (Brazil) Marcos Gomes	Aston Martin 4.0 L Turbo V8	MI	172	+13 laps
21	LMP2 Pro-Am	44	(Slovakia) ARC Bratislava	(Slovakia) Miro Konôpka (United Kingdom) Oliver Webb (India) Kush Maini	Oreca 07	G	172	+13 laps
21	LMP2 Pro-Am	44	(Slovakia) ARC Bratislava	(Slovakia) Miro Konôpka (United Kingdom) Oliver Webb (India) Kush Maini	Gibson GK428 4.2 L V8	G	172	+13 laps
22	LMGTE Am	83	(Italy) AF Corse	(France) François Perrodo (Denmark) Nicklas Nielsen (Italy) Alessio Rovera	Ferrari 488 GTE Evo	MI	172	+13 laps
22	LMGTE Am	83	(Italy) AF Corse	(France) François Perrodo (Denmark) Nicklas Nielsen (Italy) Alessio Rovera	Ferrari F154CB 3.9 L Turbo V8	MI	172	+13 laps
23	LMGTE Am	86	(United Kingdom) GR Racing	(United Kingdom) Michael Wainwright (United Kingdom) Ben Barker (United Kingdom) Tom Gamble	Porsche 911 RSR-19	MI	171	+14 laps
23	LMGTE Am	86	(United Kingdom) GR Racing	(United Kingdom) Michael Wainwright (United Kingdom) Ben Barker (United Kingdom) Tom Gamble	Porsche 4.2 L Flat-6	MI	171	+14 laps
24	LMGTE Am	54	(Italy) AF Corse	(Switzerland) Thomas Flohr (Italy) Francesco Castellacci (Italy) Giancarlo Fisichella	Ferrari 488 GTE Evo	MI	171	+14 laps
24	LMGTE Am	54	(Italy) AF Corse	(Switzerland) Thomas Flohr (Italy) Francesco Castellacci (Italy) Giancarlo Fisichella	Ferrari F154CB 3.9 L Turbo V8	MI	171	+14 laps
25	LMGTE Am	85	(Italy) Iron Lynx	(Switzerland) Rahel Frey (Belgium) Sarah Bovy (United Kingdom) Katherine Legge	Ferrari 488 GTE Evo	MI	171	+14 laps
25	LMGTE Am	85	(Italy) Iron Lynx	(Switzerland) Rahel Frey (Belgium) Sarah Bovy (United Kingdom) Katherine Legge	Ferrari F154CB 3.9 L Turbo V8	MI	171	+14 laps
26	LMGTE Am	57	(Switzerland) Kessel Racing	(Japan) Takeshi Kimura (Denmark) Mikkel Jensen (Australia) Scott Andrews	Ferrari 488 GTE Evo	MI	170	+15 laps
26	LMGTE Am	57	(Switzerland) Kessel Racing	(Japan) Takeshi Kimura (Denmark) Mikkel Jensen (Australia) Scott Andrews	Ferrari F154CB 3.9 L Turbo V8	MI	170	+15 laps
27	LMGTE Am	47	(Italy) Cetliar Racing	(Italy) Roberto Lacorte (Italy) Giorgio Sernagiotto (Italy) Antonio Fuoco	Ferrari 488 GTE Evo	MI	170	+15 laps
27	LMGTE Am	47	(Italy) Cetliar Racing	(Italy) Roberto Lacorte (Italy) Giorgio Sernagiotto (Italy) Antonio Fuoco	Ferrari F154CB 3.9 L Turbo V8	MI	170	+15 laps
28	LMGTE Am	777	(Japan) D'station Racing	(Japan) Satoshi Hoshino (Japan) Tomonobu Fujii (United Kingdom) Andrew Watson	Aston Martin Vantage AMR	MI	169	+16 laps
28	LMGTE Am	777	(Japan) D'station Racing	(Japan) Satoshi Hoshino (Japan) Tomonobu Fujii (United Kingdom) Andrew Watson	Aston Martin 4.0 L Turbo V8	MI	169	+16 laps
29	LMGTE Am	60	(Italy) Iron Lynx	(Italy) Rino Mastronardi (Italy) Andrea Piccini (Italy) Matteo Cressoni	Ferrari 488 GTE Evo	MI	169	+16 laps
29	LMGTE Am	60	(Italy) Iron Lynx	(Italy) Rino Mastronardi (Italy) Andrea Piccini (Italy) Matteo Cressoni	Ferrari F154CB 3.9 L Turbo V8	MI	169	+16 laps
30	LMP2 Pro-Am	21	(United States) DragonSpeed USA	(Sweden) Henrik Hedman (Colombia) Juan Pablo Montoya (United Kingdom) Ben Hanley	Oreca 07	G	166	+19 laps
30	LMP2 Pro-Am	21	(United States) DragonSpeed USA	(Sweden) Henrik Hedman (Colombia) Juan Pablo Montoya (United Kingdom) Ben Hanley	Gibson GK428 4.2 L V8	G	166	+19 laps
31	LMGTE Am	88	(Germany) Dempsey-Proton Racing	(United Arab Emirates) Khaled Al Qubaisi (Belgium) Adrien De Leener (France) Julien Andlauer	Porsche 911 RSR-19	MI	166	+19 laps
31	LMGTE Am	88	(Germany) Dempsey-Proton Racing	(United Arab Emirates) Khaled Al Qubaisi (Belgium) Adrien De Leener (France) Julien Andlauer	Porsche 4.2 L Flat-6	MI	166	+19 laps
