= Ryan Hardwick =

American racing driver (born 1980)

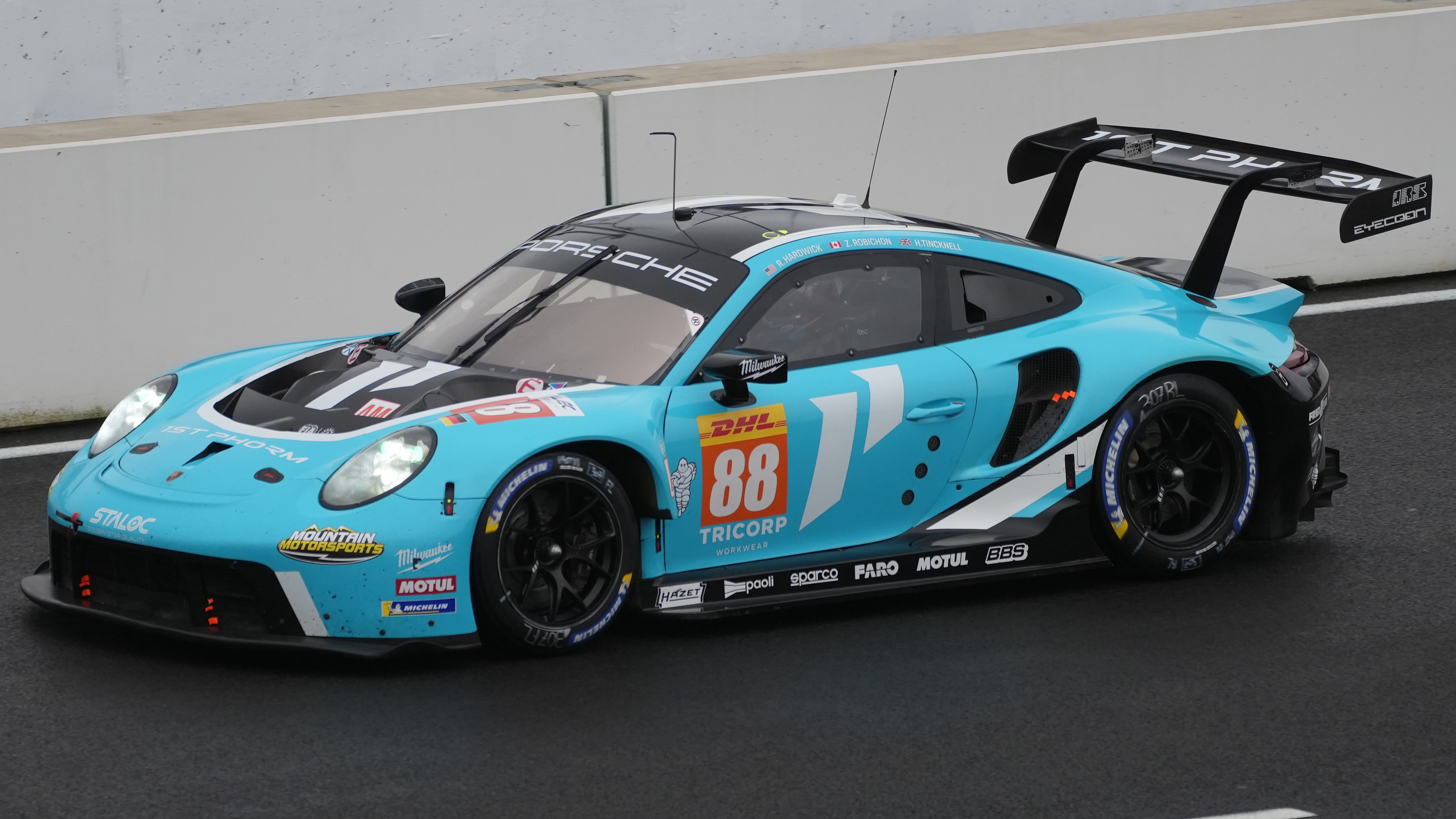
- Hardwick in 2023
- Nationality: (United States) American
- Born: Ryan Walter Hardwick; 3 October 1980 (age 46) Knoxville, Tennessee, U.S.

IMSA SportsCar Championship career
- Debut season: 2019
- Current team: Manthey 1st Phorm
- Categorisation: FIA Bronze
- Car number: 912
- Former teams: Paul Miller Racing, Proton Competition, Wright Motorsports
- Starts: 36
- Wins: 3
- Podiums: 8
- Best finish: 2nd in 2020, 2022

Previous series
- 2024–25 2023–2025 2023 2021 2018 2017–2019: Asian Le Mans Series; FIA World Endurance Championship; European Le Mans Series; Michelin Pilot Challenge; SprintX GT Championship Series; Lamborghini Super Trofeo North America

Championship titles
- 2025 2023 2018 2018: FIA WEC - LMGT3; ELMS - LMGTE; SprintX - GT Cup; LSTNA - Am

Awards
- 2020, 2022: Bob Akin Award

Ryan Walter Hardwick (born 3 October 1980) is an American entrepreneur, racing driver and former professional jet ski pilot. He is the co-founder of powersports retailer Mountain Motorsports.

An FIA Bronze–rated driver primarily competing in grand tourer sports cars, Hardwick has won the 2022 24 Hours of Daytona in GTD and 2025 24 Hours of Le Mans in LMGT3, and is also a class champion, winning the 2023 European Le Mans Series in LMGTE and the 2025 FIA World Endurance Championship in LMGT3. He currently drives for Manthey Racing in the 2026 IMSA SportsCar Championship.

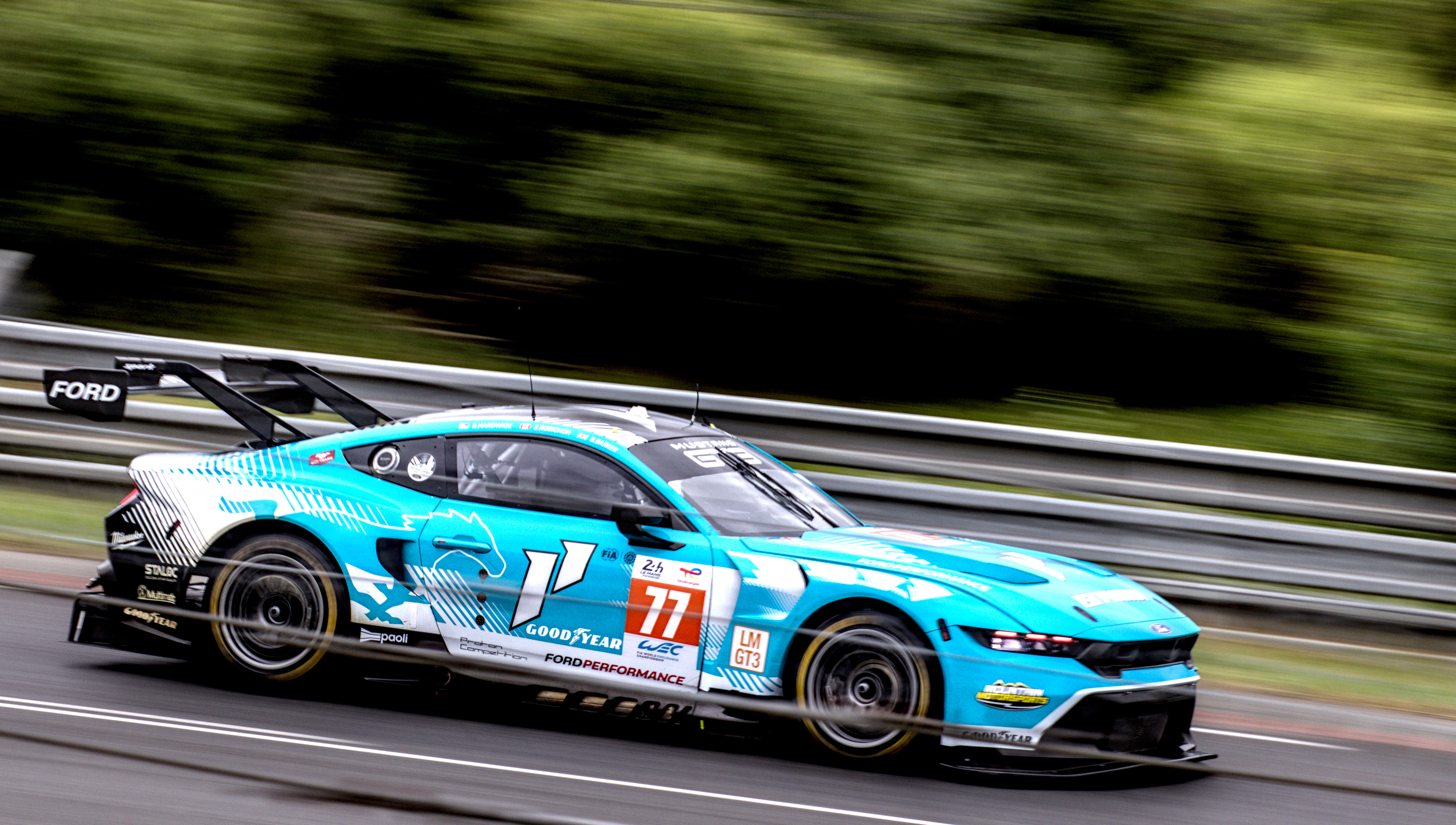
Hardwick's 1st Phorm–branded Proton Competition Ford at the 2024 24 Hours of Le Mans.

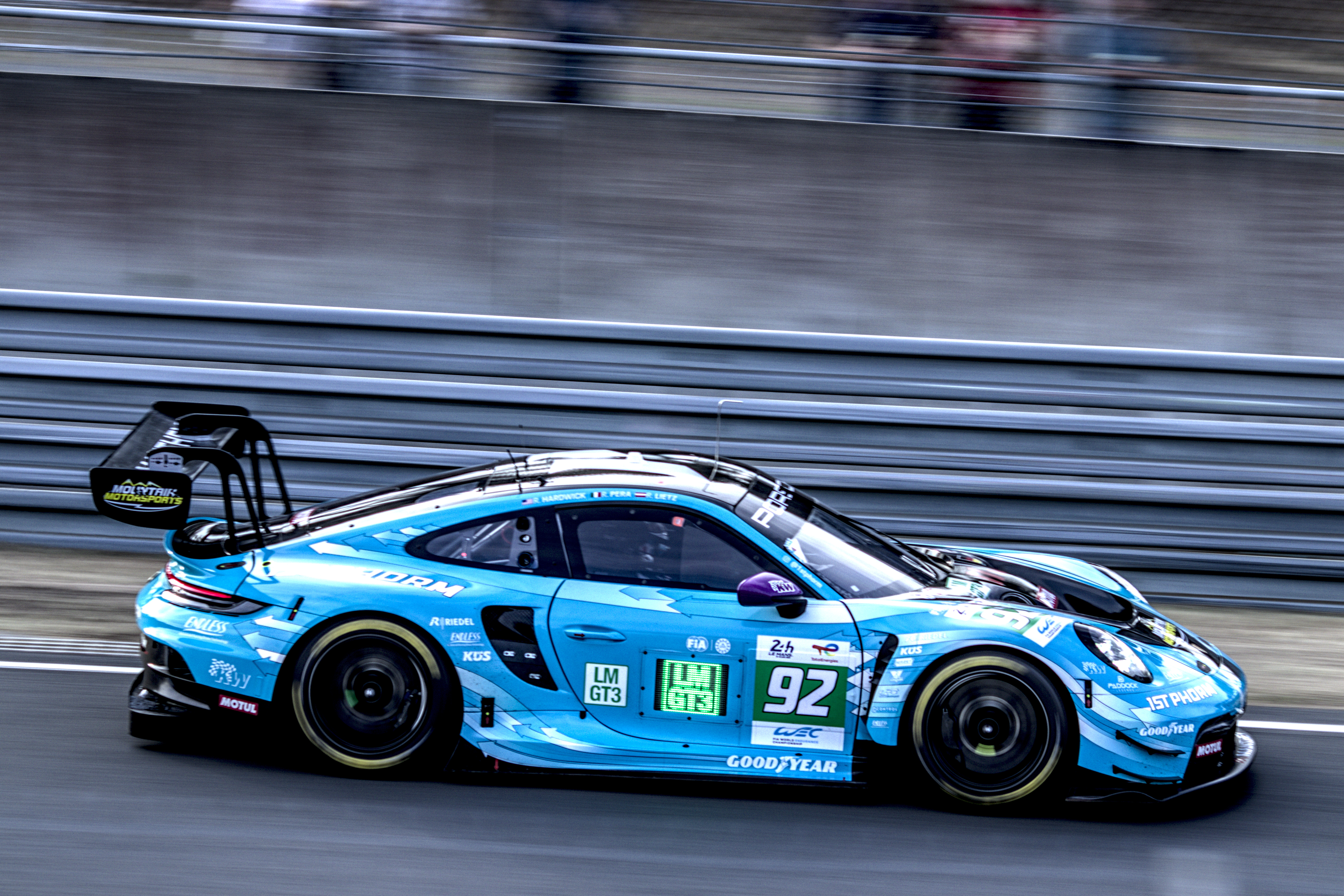
Hardwick at the wheel of his Manthey Racing Porsche, which won both the WEC and the 24h Le Mans in LMGT3 in 2025.

== Racing record ==
=== Career summary ===
Season	Series	Team	Races	Wins	Poles	F/Laps	Podiums	Points	Position
2017	Lamborghini Super Trofeo North America - LB Cup	Dream Racing Motorsports	?	?	?	?	?	108	**2nd**
2017	Italian GT Championship - Super GT Cup	Antonelli Motorsport	1	0	0	0	0	3	34th
2018	SprintX GT Championship Series - GT Cup	Dream Racing Motorsports	8	6	3	6	7	198	**1st**
2018	Lamborghini Super Trofeo North America - Am	Dream Racing Motorsports	?	?	?	?	?	?	**1st**
2018	Lamborghini Super Trofeo World Final - Am	Dream Racing Motorsports	2	1	0	0	2	—N/a	**1st**
2019	IMSA SportsCar Championship - GTD	Paul Miller Racing	5	0	0	0	1	78	32nd
2019	Lamborghini Super Trofeo North America - Pro-Am	Dream Racing Motorsport	2	0	0	0	2	22	8th
2020	IMSA SportsCar Championship - GTD	Wright Motorsports	11	1	0	0	4	284	**2nd**
2021	Michelin Pilot Challenge – GS	Wright Motorsports	7	2	1	0	5	2010	10th
2021	IMSA SportsCar Championship - GTD	Wright Motorsports	1	0	0	0	0	225	59th
2022	IMSA SportsCar Championship - GTD	Wright Motorsports	11	2	0	0	2	2875	**2nd**
2023	IMSA SportsCar Championship - GTD	Wright Motorsports	4	0	0	0	1	1052	24th
2023	FIA World Endurance Championship - LMGTE Am	Proton Competition	3	0	0	0	0	14	22nd
2023	European Le Mans Series - LMGTE	Proton Competition	6	2	1	0	5	105	**1st**
2023	24 Hours of Le Mans - LMGTE Am	Proton Competition	1	0	0	0	0	—N/a	DNF
2024	IMSA SportsCar Championship - GTD	Proton Competition	4	0	0	0	0	616	43rd
2024	FIA World Endurance Championship - LMGT3	Proton Competition	8	0	0	0	0	18	22nd
2024	24 Hours of Le Mans - LMGT3	Proton Competition	1	0	0	0	0	—N/a	17th
2024–25	Asian Le Mans Series - GT	Manthey EMA	6	1	0	0	3	76	**2nd**
2025	FIA World Endurance Championship - LMGT3	Manthey 1st Phorm	8	2	0	0	2	123	**1st**
2025	24 Hours of Le Mans - LMGT3	Manthey 1st Phorm	1	1	0	0	1	—N/a	**1st**
2026	IMSA SportsCar Championship - GTD	Manthey 1st Phorm	5	1	0	0	2	1189	30th

=== Complete IMSA SportsCar Championship results ===
(key) Races in bold indicates pole position. Races in italics indicates fastest lap.

Year	Team	Class	Make	Engine	1	2	3	4	5	6	7	8	9	10	11	12	Pos.	Points	Ref
2019	Paul Miller Racing	GTD	Lamborghini Huracán GT3 Evo	Lamborghini DGF 5.2 L V10	DAY; 15	SEB; 16	MDO; 3	DET; 5†	WGL; 14	MOS; DNS	LIM	ELK	VIR	LGA	PET		32nd	78	
2020	Wright Motorsports	GTD	Porsche 911 GT3 R	Porsche 4.0 L Flat-6	DAY; 4	DAY; 7	SEB; 9†	ELK; 5	VIR; 5	ATL; 3	MDO; 3	CLT; 2	PET; 4	LGA; 6	**SEB**; **1**		2nd	284	
2021	Wright Motorsports	GTD	Porsche 911 GT3 R	Porsche 4.0 L Flat-6	DAY	SEB	MDO; 12	DET	WGL	WGL	LIM	ELK	LGA	LBH	VIR	PET	59th	225	
2022	Wright Motorsports	GTD	Porsche 911 GT3 R	Porsche 4.0 L Flat-6	DAY; 1	**SEB**; **10**	LBH; 5	LGA; 1	MDO; 9	DET; 7	WGL; 6	MOS	LIM; 6	ELK; 7	VIR; 5	PET; 4	2nd	2875	
2023	Wright Motorsports	GTD	Porsche 911 GT3 R (992)	Porsche M97/80 4.2 L Flat-6	DAY; 9	SEB; 6	LBH	MON	WGL; 3	MOS	LIM	ELK	VIR	IMS	PET; 11		24th	1052	
2024	Proton Competition	GTD	Ford Mustang GT3	Ford Coyote 5.4 L V8	DAY; 20	SEB; 16	LBH	LGA	WGL; 17	MOS	ELK	VIR	IMS	PET; 17			43rd	616	
2026	Manthey 1st Phorm	GTD	Porsche 911 GT3 R (992)	Porsche M97/80 4.2 L Flat-6	DAY; 12	SEB; 19	LBH	LGA	WGL; 1	MOS	ELK; 16	VIR	IMS	PET; 2			30th	1189	

^{†} Points only counted towards the WeatherTech Sprint Cup and not the overall GTD Championship.

=== Complete Michelin Pilot Challenge results ===
(key) Races in bold indicates pole position. Races in italics indicates fastest lap.

Year	Team	Class	Make	Engine	1	2	3	4	5	6	7	8	9	10	Pos.	Points
2021	Wright Motorsports	Grand Sport	Porsche 718 Cayman GT4 Clubsport	Porsche 3.8 L Flat-6	DAY; WD	SEB	**MOH**; **2**	WGL1; 4	WGL2; 2	LIM; 3	ELK; 22	LGA	VIR; 1	ATL; 1	10th	2010

=== Complete FIA World Endurance Championship results ===
(key) Races in bold indicates pole position. Races in italics indicates fastest lap.

Year	Entrant	Class	Car	Engine	1	2	3	4	5	6	7	8	Rank	Points
2023	Proton Competition	LMGTE Am	Porsche 911 RSR-19	Porsche 4.2 L Flat-6	SEB; WD	ALG; 9	SPA; 4	LMS	MNZ	FUJ	BHR		22nd	14
2024	Proton Competition	LMGT3	Ford Mustang GT3	Ford Coyote 5.4 L V8	QAT; 11	IMO; 9	SPA; 9	LMS; 14	SÃO; 7	COA; 6	FUJ; 15	BHR; Ret	22nd	18
2025	Manthey 1st Phorm	LMGT3	Porsche 911 GT3 R (992)	Porsche M97/80 4.2 L Flat-6	QAT; 12	IMO; 1	SPA; 7	LMS; 1	SÃO; 6	COA; 7	FUJ; 5	BHR; 4	1st	123

^{*} Season still in progress.

=== Complete 24 Hours of Le Mans results ===
Year	Team	Co-Drivers	Car	Class	Laps	Pos.	Class Pos.
2023	(Germany) Proton Competition	(Belgium) Jan Heylen (Canada) Zacharie Robichon	Porsche 911 RSR-19	LMGTE Am	28	DNF	DNF
2024	(Germany) Proton Competition	(United Kingdom) Ben Barker (Canada) Zacharie Robichon	Ford Mustang GT3	LMGT3	227	46th	17th
2025	(Germany) Manthey 1st Phorm	(Austria) Richard Lietz (Italy) Riccardo Pera	Porsche 911 GT3 R (992)	LMGT3	341	33rd	**1st**

=== Complete European Le Mans Series results ===
(key) (Races in bold indicate pole position; results in italics indicate fastest lap)

Year	Entrant	Class	Chassis	Engine	1	2	3	4	5	6	Rank	Points
2023	Proton Competition	LMGTE	Porsche 911 RSR-19	Porsche 4.2 L Flat-6	CAT; 1	LEC; 9	ARA; 2	**SPA**; **3**	PRT; 2	**ALG**; **1**	1st	105

=== Complete Asian Le Mans Series results ===
(key) (Races in bold indicate pole position; results in italics indicate fastest lap)

Year	Entrant	Class	Chassis	Engine	1	2	3	4	5	6	Rank	Points
2024-25	Manthey EMA	GT	Porsche 911 GT3 R (992)	Porsche M97/80 4.2 L Flat-6	SEP; 1; 3	SEP; 2; 13	DUB; 1; 2	DUB; 2; 5	ABU; 1; 1	ABU; 2; 7	2nd	76

Sporting positions
Preceded by Gianmaria Bruni; Lorenzo Ferrari; Christian Reid	European Le Mans Series; LMGTE Champion; 2023; With: Alessio Picariello; Zacharie Robichon	Succeeded by None (Class discontinued)
Preceded by Klaus Bachler; Alex Malykhin; Joel Sturm	FIA Endurance Trophy for LMGT3 Drivers; Champion; 2025; With: Richard Lietz & Riccardo Pera	Succeeded by Incumbent
