= 2022 6 Hours of Spa-Francorchamps =

Endurance sports car racing

(Belgium) 2022 TotalEnergies 6 Hours of Spa-Francorchamps
Event information
- Round 2 of 6 in the 2022 FIA World Endurance Championship
- Date: 7 May 2022
- Location: Stavelot
- Venue: Circuit de Spa-Francorchamps
- Duration: 6 hours

Results
- Laps completed: 103
- Distance (km): 721.412
- Distance (miles): 448.256
- Hypercar

Pole position
- Time: 2:02.771
- Team: (United States) Glickenhaus Racing

Winners
- Team: (Japan) Toyota Gazoo Racing
- Drivers: (United Kingdom) Mike Conway (Japan) Kamui Kobayashi (Argentina) José María López
- LMP2

Winners
- Team: (Belgium) WRT
- Drivers: (Netherlands) Robin Frijns (Indonesia) Sean Gelael (Germany) René Rast
- LMP2 Pro-Am

Winners
- Team: (Italy) AF Corse
- Drivers: (Denmark) Nicklas Nielsen (France) François Perrodo (Italy) Alessio Rovera
- LMGTE Pro

Winners
- Team: (Italy) AF Corse
- Drivers: (United Kingdom) James Calado (Italy) Alessandro Pier Guidi
- LMGTE Am

Winners
- Team: (Germany) Dempsey-Proton Racing
- Drivers: (United Kingdom) Sebastian Priaulx (Germany) Christian Ried (United Kingdom) Harry Tincknell

The 2022 TotalEnergies 6 Hours of Spa-Francorchamps was an endurance sports car racing event held at the Circuit de Spa-Francorchamps, Stavelot, Belgium on 7 May 2022. It was the second round of the 2022 FIA World Endurance Championship, and was the eleventh running of the event as part of the championship.

== Background ==
The provisional calendar for the 2022 FIA World Endurance Championship released in August 2021. It saw a few changes, with the return of the Sebring and Fuji races, whilst the Portimao and second Bahrain races were dropped.

== Entry list ==
The entry list was revealed on 25 March 2022.

== Qualifying ==
Pole position winners in each class are marked in bold.

Pos	Class	No.	Team	Time	Gap	Grid
1	**Hypercar**	**708**	**(United States) Glickenhaus Racing**	**2:02.771**	-	**1**
2	Hypercar	36	(France) Alpine Elf Team	2:02.999	+0.228	2
3	Hypercar	7	(Japan) Toyota Gazoo Racing	2:03.087	+0.316	3
4	Hypercar	8	(Japan) Toyota Gazoo Racing	2:03.137	+0.366	4
5	**LMP2 Pro-Am**	**83**	**(Italy) AF Corse**	**2:04.246**	**+1.475**	**5**
6	**LMP2**	**31**	**(Belgium) WRT**	**2:04.290**	**+1.519**	**6**
7	LMP2	22	(United States) United Autosports USA	2:04.451	+1.680	7
8	LMP2	9	(Italy) Prema Orlen Team	2:04.548	+1.777	8
9	LMP2	41	(Switzerland) RealTeam by WRT	2:04.640	+1.869	9
10	LMP2	38	(United Kingdom) JOTA	2:04.692	+1.921	10
11	LMP2	28	(United Kingdom) JOTA	2:04.717	+1.946	11
12	LMP2	5	(United States) Team Penske	2:04.887	+2.116	12
13	LMP2	10	(United Kingdom) Vector Sport	2:04.985	+2.214	13
14	LMP2	1	(France) Richard Mille Racing Team	2:05.148	+2.377	14
15	LMP2 Pro-Am	45	(Portugal) Algarve Pro Racing	2:05.370	+2.599	15
16	LMP2	34	(Poland) Inter Europol Competition	2:05.383	+2.612	16
17	LMP2 Pro-Am	35	(France) Ultimate	2:05.843	+3.072	17
18	LMP2	23	(United States) United Autosports USA	2:05.849	+3.078	18
19	LMP2 Pro-Am	44	(Slovakia) ARC Bratislava	2:06.667	+3.896	19
20	**LMGTE Pro**	**91**	**(Germany) Porsche GT Team**	**2:14.301**	**+11.530**	**20**
21	LMGTE Pro	92	(Germany) Porsche GT Team	2:14.481	+11.710	21
22	LMGTE Pro	64	(United States) Corvette Racing	2:14.606	+11.835	22
23	LMGTE Pro	51	(Italy) AF Corse	2:15.102	+12.331	23
24	LMGTE Pro	52	(Italy) AF Corse	2:15.443	+12.672	24
25	**LMGTE Am**	**33**	**(United Kingdom) TF Sport**	**2:17.408**	**+14.637**	**25**
26	LMGTE Am	98	(Canada) Northwest AMR	2:18.912	+16.141	26
27	LMGTE Am	56	(Germany) Team Project 1	2:19.700	+16.929	27
28	LMGTE Am	85	(Italy) Iron Dames	2:20.789	+18.018	28
29	LMGTE Am	46	(Germany) Team Project 1	2:20.937	+18.166	29
30	LMGTE Am	77	(Germany) Dempsey-Proton Racing	2:21.027	+18.256	30
31	LMGTE Am	777	(Japan) D'Station Racing	2:21.168	+18.397	31
32	LMGTE Am	54	(Italy) AF Corse	2:21.787	+19.016	32
33	LMGTE Am	88	(Germany) Dempsey-Proton Racing	2:22.622	+19.851	33
34	LMGTE Am	60	(Italy) Iron Lynx	2:23.856	+21.085	34
35	LMGTE Am	71	(Switzerland) Spirit of Race	2:23.963	+21.192	35
36	LMGTE Am	86	(United Kingdom) GR Racing	2:24.384	+21.613	36
37	LMGTE Am	21	(Italy) AF Corse	No Time	—	37

== Race ==
The race was stopped thrice during the course of the event with red flags. The first stoppage was after the crash of the #44 ARC Bratislava entry, which required repairs to the barriers. The second stoppage was for a long period of heavy rain showering the circuit and the last stoppage was after the crash of the #34 Inter Europol Competition entry.

=== Race Result ===
The minimum number of laps for classification (70% of overall winning car's distance) was 73 laps. Class winners are in bold and ‡.

Pos	Class	No	Team	Drivers	Chassis	Tyre	Laps	Time/Retired
Pos	Class	No	Team	Drivers	Engine	Tyre	Laps	Time/Retired
1	**Hypercar**	**7**	**(Japan) Toyota Gazoo Racing**	**(United Kingdom) Mike Conway (Japan) Kamui Kobayashi (Argentina) José María López**	**Toyota GR010 Hybrid**	MI	**103**	**6:00:31.052‡**
1	**Hypercar**	**7**	**(Japan) Toyota Gazoo Racing**	**(United Kingdom) Mike Conway (Japan) Kamui Kobayashi (Argentina) José María López**	**Toyota H8909 3.5 L Turbo V6**	MI	**103**	**6:00:31.052‡**
2	Hypercar	36	(France) Alpine Elf Team	(France) Nicolas Lapierre (Brazil) André Negrão (France) Matthieu Vaxivière	Alpine A480	MI	103	+27.473
2	Hypercar	36	(France) Alpine Elf Team	(France) Nicolas Lapierre (Brazil) André Negrão (France) Matthieu Vaxivière	Gibson GL458 4.5 L V8	MI	103	+27.473
3	**LMP2**	**31**	**(Belgium) WRT**	**(Netherlands) Robin Frijns (Indonesia) Sean Gelael (Germany) René Rast**	**Oreca 07**	G	**103**	**+1:06.185‡**
3	**LMP2**	**31**	**(Belgium) WRT**	**(Netherlands) Robin Frijns (Indonesia) Sean Gelael (Germany) René Rast**	**Gibson GK428 4.2 L V8**	G	**103**	**+1:06.185‡**
4	LMP2	41	(Switzerland) RealTeam by WRT	(Portugal) Rui Andrade (Austria) Ferdinand Habsburg (France) Norman Nato	Oreca 07	G	103	+1:40.676
4	LMP2	41	(Switzerland) RealTeam by WRT	(Portugal) Rui Andrade (Austria) Ferdinand Habsburg (France) Norman Nato	Gibson GK428 4.2 L V8	G	103	+1:40.676
5	LMP2	38	(United Kingdom) Jota	(Portugal) António Félix da Costa (Mexico) Roberto González (United Kingdom) Will Stevens	Oreca 07	G	103	+1:48.571
5	LMP2	38	(United Kingdom) Jota	(Portugal) António Félix da Costa (Mexico) Roberto González (United Kingdom) Will Stevens	Gibson GK428 4.2 L V8	G	103	+1:48.571
6	LMP2	5	(United States) Team Penske	(United States) Dane Cameron (France) Emmanuel Collard (Brazil) Felipe Nasr	Oreca 07	G	103	+1:57.610
6	LMP2	5	(United States) Team Penske	(United States) Dane Cameron (France) Emmanuel Collard (Brazil) Felipe Nasr	Gibson GK428 4.2 L V8	G	103	+1:57.610
7	LMP2	22	(United States) United Autosports USA	(Portugal) Filipe Albuquerque (United Kingdom) Philip Hanson (United States) Will Owen	Oreca 07	G	103	+1:57.901
7	LMP2	22	(United States) United Autosports USA	(Portugal) Filipe Albuquerque (United Kingdom) Philip Hanson (United States) Will Owen	Gibson GK428 4.2 L V8	G	103	+1:57.901
8	LMP2	23	(United States) United Autosports USA	(United Kingdom) Oliver Jarvis (United States) Josh Pierson (United Kingdom) Alex Lynn	Oreca 07	G	102	+1 Lap
8	LMP2	23	(United States) United Autosports USA	(United Kingdom) Oliver Jarvis (United States) Josh Pierson (United Kingdom) Alex Lynn	Gibson GK428 4.2 L V8	G	102	+1 Lap
9	Hypercar	708	(United States) Glickenhaus Racing	(France) Romain Dumas (France) Olivier Pla (Brazil) Pipo Derani	Glickenhaus SCG 007 LMH	MI	102	+1 Lap
9	Hypercar	708	(United States) Glickenhaus Racing	(France) Romain Dumas (France) Olivier Pla (Brazil) Pipo Derani	Glickenhaus P21 3.5 L Turbo V8	MI	102	+1 Lap
10	LMP2	9	(Italy) Prema Orlen Team	(Italy) Lorenzo Colombo (Switzerland) Louis Delétraz (Poland) Robert Kubica	Oreca 07	G	102	+1 Lap
10	LMP2	9	(Italy) Prema Orlen Team	(Italy) Lorenzo Colombo (Switzerland) Louis Delétraz (Poland) Robert Kubica	Gibson GK428 4.2 L V8	G	102	+1 Lap
11	**LMGTE Pro**	**51**	**(Italy) AF Corse**	**(United Kingdom) James Calado (Italy) Alessandro Pier Guidi**	**Ferrari 488 GTE Evo**	MI	**102**	**+1 Lap‡**
11	**LMGTE Pro**	**51**	**(Italy) AF Corse**	**(United Kingdom) James Calado (Italy) Alessandro Pier Guidi**	**Ferrari F154CB 3.9 L Turbo V8**	MI	**102**	**+1 Lap‡**
12	LMGTE Pro	92	(Germany) Porsche GT Team	(Denmark) Michael Christensen (France) Kévin Estre	Porsche 911 RSR-19	MI	102	+1 Lap
12	LMGTE Pro	92	(Germany) Porsche GT Team	(Denmark) Michael Christensen (France) Kévin Estre	Porsche 4.2 L Flat-6	MI	102	+1 Lap
13	LMGTE Pro	52	(Italy) AF Corse	(Italy) Antonio Fuoco (Spain) Miguel Molina	Ferrari 488 GTE Evo	MI	102	+1 Lap
13	LMGTE Pro	52	(Italy) AF Corse	(Italy) Antonio Fuoco (Spain) Miguel Molina	Ferrari F154CB 3.9 L Turbo V8	MI	102	+1 Lap
14	LMP2	1	(France) Richard Mille Racing Team	(France) Charles Milesi (France) Sébastien Ogier (France) Lilou Wadoux	Oreca 07	G	101	+2 Laps
14	LMP2	1	(France) Richard Mille Racing Team	(France) Charles Milesi (France) Sébastien Ogier (France) Lilou Wadoux	Gibson GK428 4.2 L V8	G	101	+2 Laps
15	**LMP2 Pro-Am**	**83**	**(Italy) AF Corse**	**(Denmark) Nicklas Nielsen (France) François Perrodo (Italy) Alessio Rovera**	**Oreca 07**	G	**101**	**+2 Laps‡**
15	**LMP2 Pro-Am**	**83**	**(Italy) AF Corse**	**(Denmark) Nicklas Nielsen (France) François Perrodo (Italy) Alessio Rovera**	**Gibson GK428 4.2 L V8**	G	**101**	**+2 Laps‡**
16	LMP2	10	(United Kingdom) Vector Sport	(Republic of Ireland) Ryan Cullen (Switzerland) Nico Müller (France) Sébastien Bourdais	Oreca 07	G	101	+2 Laps
16	LMP2	10	(United Kingdom) Vector Sport	(Republic of Ireland) Ryan Cullen (Switzerland) Nico Müller (France) Sébastien Bourdais	Gibson GK428 4.2 L V8	G	101	+2 Laps
17	LMP2 Pro-Am	45	(Portugal) Algarve Pro Racing	(Australia) James Allen (Austria) René Binder (United States) Steven Thomas	Oreca 07	G	101	+2 Laps
17	LMP2 Pro-Am	45	(Portugal) Algarve Pro Racing	(Australia) James Allen (Austria) René Binder (United States) Steven Thomas	Gibson GK428 4.2 L V8	G	101	+2 Laps
18	LMGTE Pro	64	(United States) Corvette Racing	(United States) Tommy Milner (United Kingdom) Nick Tandy	Chevrolet Corvette C8.R	MI	101	+2 Laps
18	LMGTE Pro	64	(United States) Corvette Racing	(United States) Tommy Milner (United Kingdom) Nick Tandy	Chevrolet 5.5 L V8	MI	101	+2 Laps
19	LMP2 Pro-Am	35	(France) Ultimate	(France) François Heriau (France) Jean-Baptiste Lahaye (France) Matthieu Lahaye	Oreca 07	G	100	+3 Laps
19	LMP2 Pro-Am	35	(France) Ultimate	(France) François Heriau (France) Jean-Baptiste Lahaye (France) Matthieu Lahaye	Gibson GK428 4.2 L V8	G	100	+3 Laps
20	LMGTE Pro	91	(Germany) Porsche GT Team	(Italy) Gianmaria Bruni (Austria) Richard Lietz	Porsche 911 RSR-19	MI	100	+3 Laps
20	LMGTE Pro	91	(Germany) Porsche GT Team	(Italy) Gianmaria Bruni (Austria) Richard Lietz	Porsche 4.2 L Flat-6	MI	100	+3 Laps
21	**LMGTE Am**	**77**	**(Germany) Dempsey-Proton Racing**	**(United Kingdom) Sebastian Priaulx (Germany) Christian Ried (United Kingdom) Harry Tincknell**	**Porsche 911 RSR-19**	MI	**99**	**+4 Laps‡**
21	**LMGTE Am**	**77**	**(Germany) Dempsey-Proton Racing**	**(United Kingdom) Sebastian Priaulx (Germany) Christian Ried (United Kingdom) Harry Tincknell**	**Porsche 4.2 L Flat-6**	MI	**99**	**+4 Laps‡**
22	LMGTE Am	33	(United Kingdom) TF Sport	(United States) Ben Keating (Denmark) Marco Sørensen (Portugal) Henrique Chaves	Aston Martin Vantage AMR	MI	99	+4 Laps
22	LMGTE Am	33	(United Kingdom) TF Sport	(United States) Ben Keating (Denmark) Marco Sørensen (Portugal) Henrique Chaves	Aston Martin 4.0 L Turbo V8	MI	99	+4 Laps
23	LMGTE Am	98	(Canada) Northwest AMR	(Canada) Paul Dalla Lana (Denmark) Nicki Thiim (United Kingdom) David Pittard	Aston Martin Vantage AMR	MI	99	+4 Laps
23	LMGTE Am	98	(Canada) Northwest AMR	(Canada) Paul Dalla Lana (Denmark) Nicki Thiim (United Kingdom) David Pittard	Aston Martin 4.0 L Turbo V8	MI	99	+4 Laps
24	LMGTE Am	54	(Italy) AF Corse	(New Zealand) Nick Cassidy (Italy) Francesco Castellacci (Switzerland) Thomas Flohr	Ferrari 488 GTE Evo	MI	99	+4 Laps
24	LMGTE Am	54	(Italy) AF Corse	(New Zealand) Nick Cassidy (Italy) Francesco Castellacci (Switzerland) Thomas Flohr	Ferrari F154CB 3.9 L Turbo V8	MI	99	+4 Laps
25	LMGTE Am	46	(Germany) Team Project 1	(Italy) Matteo Cairoli (Switzerland) Nicolas Leutwiler (Denmark) Mikkel O. Pedersen	Porsche 911 RSR-19	MI	99	+4 Laps
25	LMGTE Am	46	(Germany) Team Project 1	(Italy) Matteo Cairoli (Switzerland) Nicolas Leutwiler (Denmark) Mikkel O. Pedersen	Porsche 4.2 L Flat-6	MI	99	+4 Laps
26	LMGTE Am	86	(United Kingdom) GR Racing	(United Kingdom) Ben Barker (Italy) Riccardo Pera (United Kingdom) Michael Wainwright	Porsche 911 RSR-19	MI	98	+5 Laps
26	LMGTE Am	86	(United Kingdom) GR Racing	(United Kingdom) Ben Barker (Italy) Riccardo Pera (United Kingdom) Michael Wainwright	Porsche 4.2 L Flat-6	MI	98	+5 Laps
27	LMGTE Am	777	(Japan) D'Station Racing	(United Kingdom) Charlie Fagg (Japan) Tomonobu Fujii (Japan) Satoshi Hoshino	Aston Martin Vantage AMR	MI	97	+6 Laps
27	LMGTE Am	777	(Japan) D'Station Racing	(United Kingdom) Charlie Fagg (Japan) Tomonobu Fujii (Japan) Satoshi Hoshino	Aston Martin 4.0 L Turbo V8	MI	97	+6 Laps
28	LMGTE Am	60	(Italy) Iron Lynx	(Italy) Matteo Cressoni (Italy) Giancarlo Fisichella (Italy) Claudio Schiavoni	Ferrari 488 GTE Evo	MI	97	+6 Laps
28	LMGTE Am	60	(Italy) Iron Lynx	(Italy) Matteo Cressoni (Italy) Giancarlo Fisichella (Italy) Claudio Schiavoni	Ferrari F154CB 3.9 L Turbo V8	MI	97	+6 Laps
29	LMGTE Am	88	(Germany) Dempsey-Proton Racing	(United States) Patrick Lindsey (United States) Fred Poordad (Belgium) Jan Heylen	Porsche 911 RSR-19	MI	96	+7 Laps
29	LMGTE Am	88	(Germany) Dempsey-Proton Racing	(United States) Patrick Lindsey (United States) Fred Poordad (Belgium) Jan Heylen	Porsche 4.2 L Flat-6	MI	96	+7 Laps
30	LMGTE Am	85	(Italy) Iron Dames	(Denmark) Christina Nielsen (Switzerland) Rahel Frey (France) Doriane Pin	Ferrari 488 GTE Evo	MI	96	+7 Laps
30	LMGTE Am	85	(Italy) Iron Dames	(Denmark) Christina Nielsen (Switzerland) Rahel Frey (France) Doriane Pin	Ferrari F154CB 3.9 L Turbo V8	MI	96	+7 Laps
31	LMGTE Am	21	(Italy) AF Corse	(United States) Simon Mann (Switzerland) Christoph Ulrich (Finland) Toni Vilander	Ferrari 488 GTE Evo	MI	94	+9 Laps
31	LMGTE Am	21	(Italy) AF Corse	(United States) Simon Mann (Switzerland) Christoph Ulrich (Finland) Toni Vilander	Ferrari F154CB 3.9 L Turbo V8	MI	94	+9 Laps
32	LMGTE Am	71	(Switzerland) Spirit of Race	(France) Gabriel Aubry (France) Franck Dezoteux (France) Pierre Ragues	Ferrari 488 GTE Evo	MI	91	+12 Laps
32	LMGTE Am	71	(Switzerland) Spirit of Race	(France) Gabriel Aubry (France) Franck Dezoteux (France) Pierre Ragues	Ferrari F154CB 3.9 L Turbo V8	MI	91	+12 Laps
DNF	LMGTE Am	56	(Germany) Team Project 1	(United Kingdom) Ben Barnicoat (United States) Brendan Iribe (United Kingdom) Ollie Millroy	Porsche 911 RSR-19	MI	93	Accident damage
DNF	LMGTE Am	56	(Germany) Team Project 1	(United Kingdom) Ben Barnicoat (United States) Brendan Iribe (United Kingdom) Ollie Millroy	Porsche 4.2 L Flat-6	MI	93	Accident damage
DNF	LMP2	28	(United Kingdom) Jota	(South Africa) Jonathan Aberdein (United Arab Emirates) Ed Jones (Denmark) Oliver Rasmussen	Oreca 07	G	82	Accident damage
DNF	LMP2	28	(United Kingdom) Jota	(South Africa) Jonathan Aberdein (United Arab Emirates) Ed Jones (Denmark) Oliver Rasmussen	Gibson GK428 4.2 L V8	G	82	Accident damage
DNF	LMP2	34	(Poland) Inter Europol Competition	(Mexico) Esteban Gutiérrez (Poland) Jakub Śmiechowski (United Kingdom) Alex Brundle	Oreca 07	G	52	Accident
DNF	LMP2	34	(Poland) Inter Europol Competition	(Mexico) Esteban Gutiérrez (Poland) Jakub Śmiechowski (United Kingdom) Alex Brundle	Gibson GK428 4.2 L V8	G	52	Accident
DNF	Hypercar	8	(Japan) Toyota Gazoo Racing	(Switzerland) Sébastien Buemi (Australia) Brendon Hartley (Japan) Ryō Hirakawa	Toyota GR010 Hybrid	MI	29	Hybrid
DNF	Hypercar	8	(Japan) Toyota Gazoo Racing	(Switzerland) Sébastien Buemi (Australia) Brendon Hartley (Japan) Ryō Hirakawa	Toyota H8909 3.5 L Turbo V6	MI	29	Hybrid
DNF	LMP2 Pro-Am	44	(Slovakia) ARC Bratislava	(Netherlands) Tijmen van der Helm (Slovakia) Miroslav Konôpka (Netherlands) Bent Viscaal	Oreca 07	G	25	Accident
DNF	LMP2 Pro-Am	44	(Slovakia) ARC Bratislava	(Netherlands) Tijmen van der Helm (Slovakia) Miroslav Konôpka (Netherlands) Bent Viscaal	Gibson GK428 4.2 L V8	G	25	Accident

== Standings after the race ==
2022 Hypercar World Endurance Drivers' Championship

Pos	+/-	Driver	Points
1		(Brazil) André Negrão (France) Matthieu Vaxivière (France) Nicolas Lapierre	57
2		(France) Olivier Pla (France) Romain Dumas	39
3		(New Zealand) Brendon Hartley (Japan) Ryo Hirakawa (Switzerland) Sebastien Buemi	27
4		(Argentina) José María López (Japan) Kamui Kobayashi (United Kingdom) Mike Conway	25
5		(United States) Ryan Briscoe	23

2022 Hypercar World Endurance Manufacturers' World Championship

Pos	+/-	Manufacturer	Points
1		(France) Alpine	57
2		(Japan) Toyota	52
3		(United States) Glickenhaus	39

2022 World Endurance GTE Drivers' Championship

Pos	+/-	Driver	Points
1		(France) Kevin Estre (Denmark) Michael Christensen	57
2		(Italy) Alessandro Pier Guidi (United Kingdom) James Calado	43
3		(United Kingdom) Nick Tandy (United States) Tommy Milner	39
4		(Italy) Gianmaria Bruni (Austria) Richard Lietz	34
5		(Italy) Antonio Fuoco (Spain) Miguel Molina	27

2022 World Endurance GTE Manufacturers' Championship

Pos	+/-	Team	Points
1		(Germany) Porsche	91
2		(Italy) Ferrari	73
3		(United States) Chevrolet	39

- Note: Only the top five positions are included for the Drivers' Championship standings.
