= 2021 6 Hours of Spa-Francorchamps =

Sports car endurance race held at Spa-Francorchamps

Coordinates: 50°26′14″N 5°58′17″E

(Belgium) 2021 Total 6 Hours of Spa-Francorchamps
Event information
- Round 1 of 6 in the 2021 FIA World Endurance Championship
- Date: 1 May 2021
- Location: Stavelot
- Venue: Circuit de Spa-Francorchamps
- Duration: 6 hours

Results
- Laps completed: 162
- Distance (km): 1134.648
- Distance (miles): 705.024
- Hypercar

Pole position
- Time: 2:00.747
- Team: (Japan) Toyota Gazoo Racing

Winners
- Team: (Japan) Toyota Gazoo Racing
- Drivers: (Switzerland) Sébastien Buemi (Japan) Kazuki Nakajima (New Zealand) Brendon Hartley
- LMP2

Winners
- Team: (United Kingdom) United Autosports USA
- Drivers: (United Kingdom) Philip Hanson (Switzerland) Fabio Scherer (Portugal) Filipe Albuquerque
- LMP2 Pro-Am

Winners
- Team: (Netherlands) Racing Team Nederland
- Drivers: (Netherlands) Frits van Eerd (Netherlands) Giedo van der Garde (Netherlands) Job van Uitert
- LMGTE Pro

Winners
- Team: (Germany) Porsche GT Team
- Drivers: (France) Kévin Estre (Switzerland) Neel Jani
- LMGTE Am

Winners
- Team: (Italy) AF Corse
- Drivers: (France) François Perrodo (Denmark) Nicklas Nielsen (Italy) Alessio Rovera

The 2021 Total 6 Hours of Spa-Francorchamps was an endurance sports car racing event held at the Circuit de Spa-Francorchamps, Stavelot, Belgium on 1 May 2021. It served as the opening round of the 2021 FIA World Endurance Championship, and was the tenth running of the event as part of the championship. The race marked the debut of the new 'Hypercar' era of endurance racing and was won by the debuting #8 Toyota GR010 Hybrid.

== Qualifying ==
=== Qualifying results ===
Pole position winners in each class are marked in bold.

Pos	Class	Team	Time	Gap	Grid
1	**Hypercar**	**No. 7 Toyota Gazoo Racing**	**2:00.747**	–	**1**
2	Hypercar	No. 8 Toyota Gazoo Racing	2:01.266	+0.519	2
3	**LMP2**	**No. 22 United Autosports USA**	**2:02.404**	**+1.657**	**3**
4	Hypercar	No. 36 Alpine Elf Matmut	2:02.652	+1.905	4
5	LMP2	No. 26 G-Drive Racing	2:02.984	+2.237	5
6	**LMP2 Pro-Am**	**No. 29 Racing Team Nederland**	**2:03.435**	**+2.688**	**6**
7	LMP2 Pro-Am	No. 70 Realteam Racing	2:03.475	+2.728	7
8	LMP2 Pro-Am	No. 25 G-Drive Racing	2:03.485	+2.738	8
9	LMP2	No. 28 JOTA	2:03.516	+2.769	9
10	LMP2	No. 38 JOTA	2:03.625	+2.878	10
11	LMP2 Pro-Am	No. 21 DragonSpeed USA	2:03.816	+3.069	11
12	LMP2 Pro-Am	No. 24 PR1 Motorsports	2:03.869	+3.122	12
13	LMP2	No. 31 Team WRT	2:03.915	+3.168	13
14	LMP2	No. 34 Inter Europol Competition	2:04.207	+3.460	14
15	LMP2	No. 1 Richard Mille Racing Team	2:05.284	+4.537	15
16	LMP2 Pro-Am	No. 20 High Class Racing	2:05.522	+4.775	16
17	LMP2 Pro-Am	No. 44 ARC Bratislava	2:07.051	+6.304	17
**18**	**LMGTE-Pro**	**No. 92 Porsche GT Team**	**2:11.219**	**+10.472**	**18**
19	LMGTE-Pro	No. 52 AF Corse	2:12.351	+11.604	19
20	LMGTE-Pro	No. 91 Porsche GT Team	2:12.370	+11.623	20
21	LMGTE-Pro	No. 51 AF Corse	2:12.443	+11.696	21
22	LMGTE-Pro	No. 63 Corvette Racing	2:13.106	+12.359	22
**23**	**LMGTE-Am**	**No. 33 TF Sport**	**2:14.660**	**+13.913**	**23**
24	LMGTE-Am	No. 98 Aston Martin Racing	2:15.615	+14.868	24
25	LMGTE-Am	No. 88 Dempsey-Proton Racing	2:16.319	+15.572	25
26	LMGTE-Am	No. 54 AF Corse	2:16.367	+15.620	26
27	LMGTE-Am	No. 83 AF Corse	2:17.560	+16.813	27
28	LMGTE-Am	No. 47 Cetilar Racing	2:17.719	+16.972	28
29	LMGTE-Am	No. 85 Iron Lynx	2:18.452	+17.705	29
30	LMGTE-Am	No. 86 GR Racing	2:18.813	+18.066	30
31	LMGTE-Am	No. 60 Iron Lynx	2:20.356	+19.609	31
32	LMGTE-Am	No. 56 Team Project 1	No Time	–	32
33	LMGTE-Am	No. 77 Dempsey-Proton Racing	No Time	–	33
34	LMGTE-Am	No. 777 D'station Racing	No Time	–	34

== Race ==
=== Race result ===
The minimum number of laps for classification (70% of the overall winning car's race distance) was 113 laps. Class winners are denoted in bold and with ‡.

Final race classification
Pos.	Class	No.	Team	Drivers	Chassis	Tyre	Laps	Time/Retired
Pos.	Class	No.	Team	Drivers	Engine	Tyre	Laps	Time/Retired
1	**Hypercar**	**8**	**(Japan) Toyota Gazoo Racing**	**(Switzerland) Sébastien Buemi (Japan) Kazuki Nakajima (New Zealand) Brendon Hartley**	**Toyota GR010 Hybrid**	MI	**162**	**6:00:17.733 ‡**
1	**Hypercar**	**8**	**(Japan) Toyota Gazoo Racing**	**(Switzerland) Sébastien Buemi (Japan) Kazuki Nakajima (New Zealand) Brendon Hartley**	**Toyota 3.5 L Turbo V6**	MI	**162**	**6:00:17.733 ‡**
2	Hypercar	36	(France) Alpine Elf Matmut	(Brazil) André Negrão (France) Nicolas Lapierre (France) Matthieu Vaxivière	Alpine A480	MI	162	+1:07.196
2	Hypercar	36	(France) Alpine Elf Matmut	(Brazil) André Negrão (France) Nicolas Lapierre (France) Matthieu Vaxivière	Gibson GL458 4.5 L V8	MI	162	+1:07.196
3	Hypercar	7	(Japan) Toyota Gazoo Racing	(United Kingdom) Mike Conway (Japan) Kamui Kobayashi (Argentina) José María López	Toyota GR010 Hybrid	MI	161	+1 Lap
3	Hypercar	7	(Japan) Toyota Gazoo Racing	(United Kingdom) Mike Conway (Japan) Kamui Kobayashi (Argentina) José María López	Toyota 3.5 L Turbo V6	MI	161	+1 Lap
4	**LMP2**	**22**	**(United Kingdom) United Autosports USA**	**(United Kingdom) Philip Hanson (Switzerland) Fabio Scherer (Portugal) Filipe Albuquerque**	**Oreca 07**	G	**161**	**+1 Lap‡**
4	**LMP2**	**22**	**(United Kingdom) United Autosports USA**	**(United Kingdom) Philip Hanson (Switzerland) Fabio Scherer (Portugal) Filipe Albuquerque**	**Gibson GK428 4.2 L V8**	G	**161**	**+1 Lap‡**
5	LMP2	38	(United Kingdom) JOTA	(Mexico) Roberto González (Portugal) António Félix da Costa (United Kingdom) Anthony Davidson	Oreca 07	G	160	+2 Laps
5	LMP2	38	(United Kingdom) JOTA	(Mexico) Roberto González (Portugal) António Félix da Costa (United Kingdom) Anthony Davidson	Gibson GK428 4.2 L V8	G	160	+2 Laps
6	LMP2	28	(United Kingdom) JOTA	(Indonesia) Sean Gelael (Belgium) Stoffel Vandoorne (United Kingdom) Tom Blomqvist	Oreca 07	G	160	+2 Laps
6	LMP2	28	(United Kingdom) JOTA	(Indonesia) Sean Gelael (Belgium) Stoffel Vandoorne (United Kingdom) Tom Blomqvist	Gibson GK428 4.2 L V8	G	160	+2 Laps
7	LMP2 **(Pro-Am)**	29	(Netherlands) Racing Team Nederland	(Netherlands) Frits van Eerd (Netherlands) Giedo van der Garde (Netherlands) Job van Uitert	Oreca 07	G	159	+3 Laps ‡
7	LMP2 **(Pro-Am)**	29	(Netherlands) Racing Team Nederland	(Netherlands) Frits van Eerd (Netherlands) Giedo van der Garde (Netherlands) Job van Uitert	Gibson GK428 4.2 L V8	G	159	+3 Laps ‡
8	LMP2	34	(Poland) Inter Europol Competition	(Poland) Jakub Śmiechowski (Netherlands) Renger van der Zande (United Kingdom) Alex Brundle	Oreca 07	G	159	+3 Laps
8	LMP2	34	(Poland) Inter Europol Competition	(Poland) Jakub Śmiechowski (Netherlands) Renger van der Zande (United Kingdom) Alex Brundle	Gibson GK428 4.2 L V8	G	159	+3 Laps
9	LMP2 (Pro-Am)	70	(Switzerland) Realteam Racing	(Switzerland) Esteban Garcia (France) Loïc Duval (France) Norman Nato	Oreca 07	G	158	+4 Laps
9	LMP2 (Pro-Am)	70	(Switzerland) Realteam Racing	(Switzerland) Esteban Garcia (France) Loïc Duval (France) Norman Nato	Gibson GK428 4.2 L V8	G	158	+4 Laps
10	LMP2 (Pro-Am)	21	(United States) DragonSpeed USA	(Sweden) Henrik Hedman (Colombia) Juan Pablo Montoya (United Kingdom) Ben Hanley	Oreca 07	G	158	+4 Laps
10	LMP2 (Pro-Am)	21	(United States) DragonSpeed USA	(Sweden) Henrik Hedman (Colombia) Juan Pablo Montoya (United Kingdom) Ben Hanley	Gibson GK428 4.2 L V8	G	158	+4 Laps
11	LMP2	1	(France) Richard Mille Racing Team	(Colombia) Tatiana Calderón (Germany) Sophia Flörsch (Netherlands) Beitske Visser	Oreca 07	G	158	+4 Laps
11	LMP2	1	(France) Richard Mille Racing Team	(Colombia) Tatiana Calderón (Germany) Sophia Flörsch (Netherlands) Beitske Visser	Gibson GK428 4.2 L V8	G	158	+4 Laps
12	LMP2 (Pro-Am)	20	(Denmark) High Class Racing	(Denmark) Jan Magnussen (Denmark) Anders Fjordbach (Denmark) Dennis Andersen	Oreca 07	G	157	+5 Laps
12	LMP2 (Pro-Am)	20	(Denmark) High Class Racing	(Denmark) Jan Magnussen (Denmark) Anders Fjordbach (Denmark) Dennis Andersen	Gibson GK428 4.2 L V8	G	157	+5 Laps
13	LMP2 (Pro-Am)	25	G-Drive Racing	(United States) John Falb (Portugal) Rui Andrade (Spain) Roberto Merhi	Aurus 01	G	157	+5 Laps
13	LMP2 (Pro-Am)	25	G-Drive Racing	(United States) John Falb (Portugal) Rui Andrade (Spain) Roberto Merhi	Gibson GK428 4.2 L V8	G	157	+5 Laps
14	LMP2 (Pro-Am)	24	(United States) PR1 Motorsports	(United States) Patrick Kelly (France) Gabriel Aubry (Switzerland) Simon Trummer	Oreca 07	G	157	+5 Laps
14	LMP2 (Pro-Am)	24	(United States) PR1 Motorsports	(United States) Patrick Kelly (France) Gabriel Aubry (Switzerland) Simon Trummer	Gibson GK428 4.2 L V8	G	157	+5 Laps
15	**LMGTE Pro**	**92**	**(Germany) Porsche GT Team**	**(France) Kévin Estre (Switzerland) Neel Jani**	**Porsche 911 RSR-19**	MI	**153**	**+9 Laps ‡**
15	**LMGTE Pro**	**92**	**(Germany) Porsche GT Team**	**(France) Kévin Estre (Switzerland) Neel Jani**	**Porsche 4.2 L Flat-6**	MI	**153**	**+9 Laps ‡**
16	LMGTE Pro	51	(Italy) AF Corse	(Italy) Alessandro Pier Guidi (United Kingdom) James Calado	Ferrari 488 GTE Evo	MI	153	+9 Laps
16	LMGTE Pro	51	(Italy) AF Corse	(Italy) Alessandro Pier Guidi (United Kingdom) James Calado	Ferrari F154CB 3.9 L Turbo V8	MI	153	+9 Laps
17	LMGTE Pro	52	(Italy) AF Corse	(Brazil) Daniel Serra (Spain) Miguel Molina	Ferrari 488 GTE Evo	MI	153	+9 Laps
17	LMGTE Pro	52	(Italy) AF Corse	(Brazil) Daniel Serra (Spain) Miguel Molina	Ferrari F154CB 3.9 L Turbo V8	MI	153	+9 Laps
18	LMGTE Pro	63	(United States) Corvette Racing	(Spain) Antonio García (United Kingdom) Oliver Gavin	Chevrolet Corvette C8.R	MI	152	+10 Laps
18	LMGTE Pro	63	(United States) Corvette Racing	(Spain) Antonio García (United Kingdom) Oliver Gavin	Chevrolet 5.5 L V8	MI	152	+10 Laps
19	LMGTE Pro	91	(Germany) Porsche GT Team	(Italy) Gianmaria Bruni (Austria) Richard Lietz	Porsche 911 RSR-19	MI	152	+10 Laps
19	LMGTE Pro	91	(Germany) Porsche GT Team	(Italy) Gianmaria Bruni (Austria) Richard Lietz	Porsche 4.2 L Flat-6	MI	152	+10 Laps
20	**LMGTE Am**	**83**	**(Italy) AF Corse**	**(France) François Perrodo (Denmark) Nicklas Nielsen (Italy) Alessio Rovera**	**Ferrari 488 GTE Evo**	MI	**152**	**+10 Laps**
20	**LMGTE Am**	**83**	**(Italy) AF Corse**	**(France) François Perrodo (Denmark) Nicklas Nielsen (Italy) Alessio Rovera**	**Ferrari F154CB 3.9 L Turbo V8**	MI	**152**	**+10 Laps**
21	LMGTE Am	33	(United Kingdom) TF Sport	(United States) Ben Keating (Luxembourg) Dylan Pereira (Brazil) Felipe Fraga	Aston Martin Vantage AMR	MI	152	+10 Laps
21	LMGTE Am	33	(United Kingdom) TF Sport	(United States) Ben Keating (Luxembourg) Dylan Pereira (Brazil) Felipe Fraga	Aston Martin 4.0 L Turbo V8	MI	152	+10 Laps
22	LMGTE Am	47	(Italy) Cetliar Racing	(Italy) Roberto Lacorte (Italy) Giorgio Sernagiotto (Italy) Antonio Fuoco	Ferrari 488 GTE Evo	MI	151	+11 Laps
22	LMGTE Am	47	(Italy) Cetliar Racing	(Italy) Roberto Lacorte (Italy) Giorgio Sernagiotto (Italy) Antonio Fuoco	Ferrari F154CB 3.9 L Turbo V8	MI	151	+11 Laps
23	LMGTE Am	54	(Italy) AF Corse	(Switzerland) Thomas Flohr (Italy) Francesco Castellacci (Italy) Giancarlo Fisichella	Ferrari 488 GTE Evo	MI	151	+11 Laps
23	LMGTE Am	54	(Italy) AF Corse	(Switzerland) Thomas Flohr (Italy) Francesco Castellacci (Italy) Giancarlo Fisichella	Ferrari F154CB 3.9 L Turbo V8	MI	151	+11 Laps
24	LMGTE Am	88	(Germany) Dempsey-Proton Racing	(Indonesia) Andrew Haryanto (Germany) Marco Seefried (Belgium) Alessio Picariello	Porsche 911 RSR-19	MI	151	+11 Laps
24	LMGTE Am	88	(Germany) Dempsey-Proton Racing	(Indonesia) Andrew Haryanto (Germany) Marco Seefried (Belgium) Alessio Picariello	Porsche 4.2 L Flat-6	MI	151	+11 Laps
25	LMGTE Am	98	(United Kingdom) Aston Martin Racing	(Canada) Paul Dalla Lana (Brazil) Augusto Farfus (Brazil) Marcos Gomes	Aston Martin Vantage AMR	MI	151	+11 Laps
25	LMGTE Am	98	(United Kingdom) Aston Martin Racing	(Canada) Paul Dalla Lana (Brazil) Augusto Farfus (Brazil) Marcos Gomes	Aston Martin 4.0 L Turbo V8	MI	151	+11 Laps
26	LMGTE Am	777	(Japan) D'station Racing	(Japan) Satoshi Hoshino (Japan) Tomonobu Fujii (United Kingdom) Andrew Watson	Aston Martin Vantage AMR	MI	150	+12 Laps
26	LMGTE Am	777	(Japan) D'station Racing	(Japan) Satoshi Hoshino (Japan) Tomonobu Fujii (United Kingdom) Andrew Watson	Aston Martin 4.0 L Turbo V8	MI	150	+12 Laps
27	LMGTE Am	85	(Italy) Iron Lynx	(Switzerland) Rahel Frey (United Kingdom) Katherine Legge (Italy) Manuela Gostner	Ferrari 488 GTE Evo	MI	150	+13 Laps
27	LMGTE Am	85	(Italy) Iron Lynx	(Switzerland) Rahel Frey (United Kingdom) Katherine Legge (Italy) Manuela Gostner	Ferrari F154CB 3.9 L Turbo V8	MI	150	+13 Laps
28	LMGTE Am	60	(Italy) Iron Lynx	(Italy) Claudio Schiavoni (Italy) Andrea Piccini (Italy) Matteo Cressoni	Ferrari 488 GTE Evo	MI	149	+14 Laps
28	LMGTE Am	60	(Italy) Iron Lynx	(Italy) Claudio Schiavoni (Italy) Andrea Piccini (Italy) Matteo Cressoni	Ferrari F154CB 3.9 L Turbo V8	MI	149	+14 Laps
29	LMP2	31	(Belgium) Team WRT	(Netherlands) Robin Frijns (Austria) Ferdinand Habsburg (France) Charles Milesi	Oreca 07	G	127	+35 Laps
29	LMP2	31	(Belgium) Team WRT	(Netherlands) Robin Frijns (Austria) Ferdinand Habsburg (France) Charles Milesi	Gibson GK428 4.2 L V8	G	127	+35 Laps
DNF	LMGTE Am	77	(Germany) Dempsey-Proton Racing	(Germany) Christian Ried (New Zealand) Jaxon Evans (Australia) Matt Campbell	Porsche 911 RSR-19	MI	138	Retired
DNF	LMGTE Am	77	(Germany) Dempsey-Proton Racing	(Germany) Christian Ried (New Zealand) Jaxon Evans (Australia) Matt Campbell	Porsche 4.2 L Flat-6	MI	138	Retired
DNF	LMP2	26	G-Drive Racing	Roman Rusinov (Argentina) Franco Colapinto (Netherlands) Nyck de Vries	Aurus 01	G	125	Retired
DNF	LMP2	26	G-Drive Racing	Roman Rusinov (Argentina) Franco Colapinto (Netherlands) Nyck de Vries	Gibson GK428 4.2 L V8	G	125	Retired
DNF	LMGTE Am	86	(United Kingdom) GR Racing	(United Kingdom) Michael Wainwright (United Kingdom) Ben Barker (United Kingdom) Tom Gamble	Porsche 911 RSR-19	MI	0	Retired
DNF	LMGTE Am	86	(United Kingdom) GR Racing	(United Kingdom) Michael Wainwright (United Kingdom) Ben Barker (United Kingdom) Tom Gamble	Porsche 4.2 L Flat-6	MI	0	Retired
DNF	LMP2 (Pro-Am)	44	(Slovakia) ARC Bratislava	(Slovakia) Miro Konôpka (United Kingdom) Tom Jackson (United Kingdom) Darren Burke	Ligier JS P217	G	0	Retired
DNF	LMP2 (Pro-Am)	44	(Slovakia) ARC Bratislava	(Slovakia) Miro Konôpka (United Kingdom) Tom Jackson (United Kingdom) Darren Burke	Gibson GK428 4.2 L V8	G	0	Retired

Tyre manufacturers
Key
Symbol	Tyre manufacturer
**G**	Goodyear
**MI**	Michelin

== Standings after the race ==
2021 Hypercar World Endurance Drivers' Championship

Pos.	+/–	Driver	Points
1		(Switzerland) Sébastien Buemi (Japan) Kazuki Nakajima (New Zealand) Brendon Hartley	25
2		(France) Nicolas Lapierre (Brazil) André Negrão (France) Matthieu Vaxivière	18
3		(United Kingdom) Mike Conway (Japan) Kamui Kobayashi (Argentina) José María López	16

2021 Hypercar World Endurance Championship

Pos.	+/–	Team	Points
1		(Japan) Toyota Gazoo Racing	26
2		(France) Alpine Elf Matmut	18

- Note: Only the top five positions are included for the Drivers Championship standings.

2021 World Endurance GTE Drivers' Championship

Pos.	+/–	Driver	Points
1		(France) Kévin Estre (Switzerland) Neel Jani	26
2		(United Kingdom) James Calado (Italy) Alessandro Pier Guidi	18
3		(Spain) Miguel Molina (Brazil) Daniel Serra	15
4		(Italy) Gianmaria Bruni (Austria) Richard Lietz	12
5		(Denmark) Nicklas Nielsen (France) François Perrodo (Italy) Alessio Rovera	10

2021 World Endurance GTE Manufacturers' Championship

Pos.	+/–	Team	Points
1		(Germany) Porsche	38
2		(Italy) Ferrari	33

- Note: Only the top five positions are included for the Drivers Championship standings.
