= Porsche 911 RSR-19 =

Racing car developed by Porsche

Porsche 911 RSR-19 (991.2)
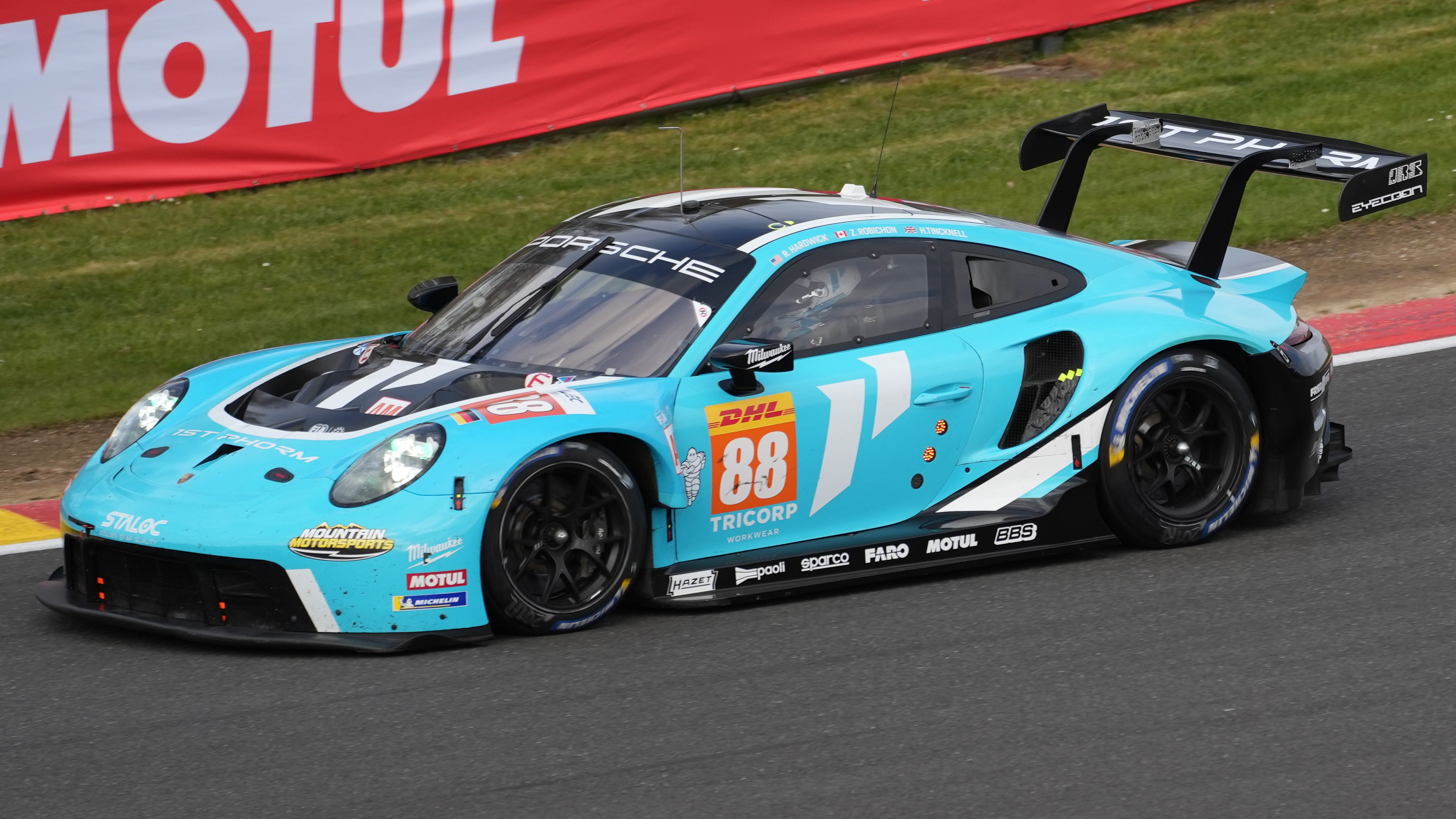
- The No. 88 Proton Competition 911 RSR-19 during the 2023 6 Hours of Spa-Francorchamps.
- Category: LM GTE (FIA WEC; ELMS); GTLM (IMSA WTSC)
- Constructor: Porsche
- Designer: Grant Larson
- Predecessor: Porsche 911 RSR (2017)
- Successor: Porsche 911 GT3 R (992) (LM GT3)

Technical specifications
- Chassis: Carbon-fibre monocoque with safety roll cage
- Length: 4,593 mm (181 in)
- Width: Front: 2,042 mm (80 in) Rear: 2,050 mm (81 in)
- Wheelbase: 2,513 mm (99 in)
- Engine: Porsche M97/80 4,194 cc (256 cu in) Flat-6 NA mid-engine, rear-wheel-drive
- Torque: 360.3 lb⋅ft (489 N⋅m)
- Transmission: Porsche 6-speed sequential semi-automatic paddle-shift
- Power: 510 PS (375 kW; 503 hp)
- Weight: 1,245 kg (2,745 lb) Subject to change under Balance of Performance
- Fuel: FIA WEC: Total; IMSA: VP Racing Fuels
- Lubricants: Mobil 1
- Brakes: 390 mm (15 in) ventilated steel discs
- Tyres: Michelin · Goodyear

Competition history
- Notable entrants: (Germany) Porsche GT Team (Germany) Team Project 1 (Germany) Dempsey-Proton Racing (United Kingdom) GR Racing (Italy) Iron Lynx (United States) Porsche GT Team (Hong Kong) Absolute Racing
- Notable drivers: (Italy) Gianmaria Bruni (Austria) Richard Lietz (France) Frédéric Makowiecki (Denmark) Michael Christensen (France) Kévin Estre (Belgium) Laurens Vanthoor (Switzerland) Neel Jani (Norway) Dennis Olsen (Norway) Anders Buchardt (Zimbabwe) Axcil Jefferies (United States) Maxwell Root (United States) Robby Foley (Italy) Matteo Cairoli (Norway) Egidio Perfetti (Italy) Riccardo Pera (Australia) Matt Campbell (New Zealand) Jaxon Evans (Germany) Christian Ried (Germany) Marco Seefried (Indonesia) Andrew Haryanto (Belgium) Alessio Picariello (France) Julien Andlauer (United States) Dominique Bastien (Germany) Lance Arnold (United Arab Emirates) Khaled Al Qubaisi (Belgium) Adrien De Leener (United Kingdom) Ben Barker (United Kingdom) Tom Gamble (United Kingdom) Michael Wainwright (Switzerland) Nicolas Leutwiler (Denmark) Mikkel O. Pedersen (United Kingdom) Ben Barnicoat (United Kingdom) Ollie Millroy (United States) Brendan Iribe (Japan) Takeshi Kimura (United States) P. J. Hyett (United States) Gunnar Jeannette (United Kingdom) Sebastian Priaulx (United Kingdom) Harry Tincknell (United States) Fred Poordad (United States) Patrick Lindsey (France) Julien Andlauer (Belgium) Jan Heylen (Portugal) Guilherme Oliveira (Portugal) Miguel Ramos (Dominican Republic) Efrin Castro (Italy) Matteo Cressoni (Belgium) Alessio Picariello (Italy) Claudio Schiavoni (Belgium) Sarah Bovy (Switzerland) Rahel Frey (Denmark) Michelle Gatting (United States) Ryan Hardwick (Canada) Zacharie Robichon (Germany) Jonas Ried (United States) Don Yount (United Kingdom) Nick Tandy (New Zealand) Earl Bamber (France) Mathieu Jaminet (Switzerland) Neel Jani (United States) Cooper MacNeil (Republic of Ireland) Michael Fassbender (Germany) Felipe Fernández Laser (Indonesia) Andrew Haryanto (Belgium) Alessio Picariello (Estonia) Martin Rump (Italy) Lorenzo Ferrari (Canada) Zacharie Robichon (Italy) Giammarco Levorato
- Debut: 2019 4 Hours of Silverstone
- First win: 2019 4 Hours of Silverstone
- Last win: 2023 8 Hours of Bahrain
- Last event: 2023 8 Hours of Bahrain
Races	Wins	Podiums	Poles	F/Laps
66	25	81	28	13
- Teams' Championships: 2 (2022 ELMS & 2023 ELMS)
- Constructors' Championships: 0
- Drivers' Championships: 2 (2022 ELMS & 2023 ELMS)

The Porsche 911 RSR-19 is a racing car developed by Porsche to compete in the LM GTE category of the FIA World Endurance Championship and European Le Mans Series, and the GTLM category of the IMSA SportsCar Championship. It serves as the direct replacement for the Porsche 911 RSR (2017). The car made its racing debut at the 2019 4 Hours of Silverstone. The car was unveiled at the 2019 Goodwood Festival of Speed, at the timing gantry of the Hillclimb circuit, just moments before its first public run, with Gianmaria Bruni at the wheel.

== Development ==
The Porsche 911 RSR-19 was revealed to have been in development since 2017. In September 2018, spy shots of the new car were seen, published in the German Auto Motor und Sport automobile magazine, taken at the test track of the Porsche Development Center in Weissach, with initial rumors saying that the car would be turbocharged. In March 2019, a 30-hour endurance test was held at the Circuit Paul Ricard, in France. In May 2019, ahead of the 2019 24 Hours of Le Mans, one of the prototypes was spotted at the Autodromo Nazionale Monza, being pitted against its predecessor.

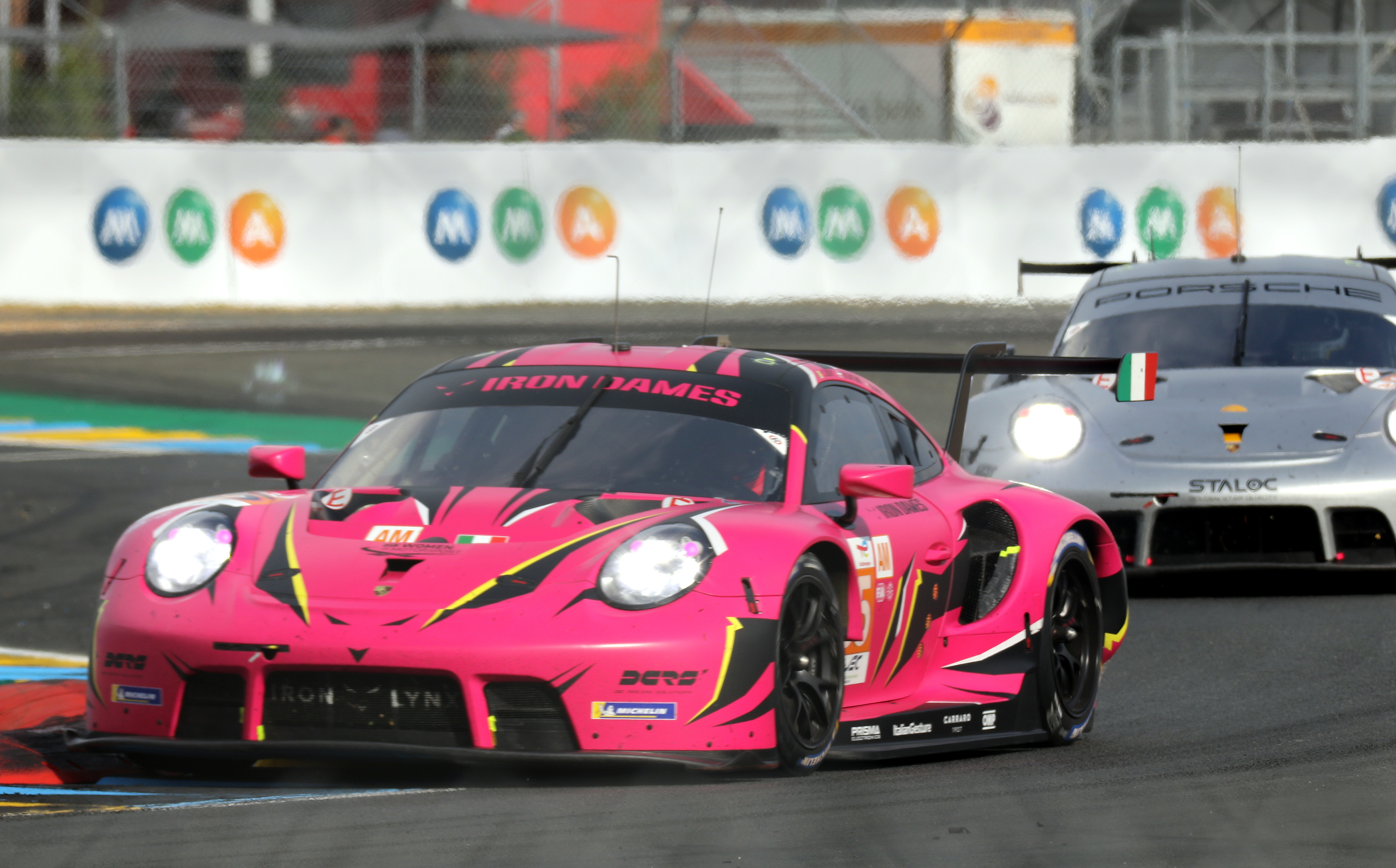
Iron Dames' No. 85 car leads fellow Porsche entrant, the No. 911 Proton Competition car during the 2023 24 Hours of Le Mans

Compared to its predecessor, it has a significant number of changes, with 95% of the bodywork being new. Power comes from an upsized, rear-mid mounted six-cylinder naturally-aspirated 4.2 litre (4.194 litre) engine, the largest ever boxer configured engine in a works 911 racing model, paired with a faster sequential six-speed constant-mesh gearbox. The exhaust has also been relocated to the side, allowing for a larger diffuser to be installed, increasing the base downforce of the car.

== Competition history ==
=== Complete World Endurance Championship results ===
(key) Races in bold indicates pole position. Races in italics indicates fastest lap.

Year	Entrant	Class	Drivers	No.	Rounds								Pts.	Pos.
Year	Entrant	Class	Drivers	No.	1	2	3	4	5	6	7	8	Pts.	Pos.
2019 - 2020	(Germany) Porsche GT Team	LMGTE Pro	(Italy) Gianmaria Bruni (Austria) Richard Lietz (France) Frédéric Makowiecki	91	SIL; 1	**FUJ**; **6**	SHA; 3	**BHR**; **5**	COTA; 8	SPA; 5	**LMN**; **9**	BHR; 2	111	7th
2019 - 2020	(Germany) Porsche GT Team	LMGTE Pro	(Denmark) Michael Christensen (France) Kévin Estre (Belgium) Laurens Vanthoor	92	SIL; 2	FUJ; 2	**SHA**; **2**	BHR; 7	COTA; 2	**SPA**; **1**	LMN; 11	**BHR**; **1**	148	3rd
2021	(Germany) Porsche GT Team	LMGTE Pro	(Italy) Gianmaria Bruni (Austria) Richard Lietz (France) Frédéric Makowiecki	91	SPA; 4	POR; 4	MNZ; 3	LMN; 4	BHR; 2	BHR; 4			111	3rd
2021	(Germany) Porsche GT Team	LMGTE Pro	(France) Kévin Estre (Switzerland) Neel Jani (Denmark) Michael Christensen	92	**SPA**; **1**	**POR**; **3**	**MNZ**; **1**	LMN; 3	**BHR**; **1**	**BHR**; **2**			166	2nd
2021	(Germany) Team Project 1	LMGTE Am	(Norway) Dennis Olsen (Norway) Anders Buchardt (Zimbabwe) Axcil Jefferies (United States) Maxwell Root (United States) Robby Foley	46	SPA; WD	POR	MNZ; 11	LMN; Ret	BHR	BHR			0.5	24th
2021	(Germany) Team Project 1	LMGTE Am	(Italy) Matteo Cairoli (Norway) Egidio Perfetti (Italy) Riccardo Pera	56	SPA; DNS	**POR**; **2**	MNZ; 4	LMN; Ret	BHR; 3	BHR; 3			78	4th
2021	(Germany) Dempsey-Proton Racing	LMGTE Am	(Australia) Matt Campbell (New Zealand) Jaxon Evans (Germany) Christian Ried	77	SPA; Ret	POR; Ret	MNZ; 5	LMN; 4	BHR; 2	BHR; 2			79	3rd
2021	(Germany) Dempsey-Proton Racing	LMGTE Am	(Germany) Marco Seefried (Indonesia) Andrew Haryanto (Belgium) Alessio Picariello (France) Julien Andlauer (United States) Dominique Bastien (Germany) Lance Arnold (United Arab Emirates) Khaled Al Qubaisi (Belgium) Adrien De Leener (Zimbabwe) Axcil Jefferies	88	SPA; 5	POR; 9	MNZ; 6	**LMN**; **8**	BHR; 12	BHR; Ret			21	16th
2021	(United Kingdom) GR Racing	LMGTE Am	(United Kingdom) Ben Barker (United Kingdom) Tom Gamble (United Kingdom) Michael Wainwright	86	SPA; Ret	POR; 8	MNZ 8	LMN; 9	BHR; 6	BHR; 9			23	15th
2022	(Germany) Porsche GT Team	LMGTE Pro	(Italy) Gianmaria Bruni (Austria) Richard Lietz (France) Frédéric Makowiecki	91	SEB; 3	SPA; 5	LMN; 1	MON; 5	FUJ; 4	BAH; 4			125	4th
2022	(Germany) Porsche GT Team	LMGTE Pro	(Denmark) Michael Christensen (France) Kévin Estre (Belgium) Laurens Vanthoor	92	**SEB**; **1**	SPA; 2	LMN; 4	MON; 4	**FUJ**; **3**	BAH; 3			132	2nd
2022	(Germany) Team Project 1	LMGTE Am	(Italy) Matteo Cairoli (Switzerland) Nicolas Leutwiler (Denmark) Mikkel O. Pedersen	46	SEB; Ret	SPA; 5	LMN; Ret	MON; 3	FUJ; 6	BAH; 1			71	7th
2022	(Germany) Team Project 1	LMGTE Am	(United Kingdom) Ben Barnicoat (United Kingdom) Ollie Millroy (United States) Brendan Iribe (Japan) Takeshi Kimura (United States) P. J. Hyett (United States) Gunnar Jeannette	56	SEB; 3	SPA; Ret	LMN; Ret	MON; 10	FUJ 8	BAH; 2			55	9th
2022	(Germany) Dempsey-Proton Racing	LMGTE Am	(United Kingdom) Sebastian Priaulx (Germany) Christian Ried (United Kingdom) Harry Tincknell	77	SEB; 4	SPA; 1	**LMN**; **14**	MON; 1	FUJ; Ret	BAH; 8			83	6th
2022	(Germany) Dempsey-Proton Racing	LMGTE Am	(United States) Fred Poordad (United States) Patrick Lindsey (France) Julien Andlauer (Belgium) Jan Heylen (United States) Maxwell Root	88	SEB; 10	SPA; 9	LMN; 5	MON; 6	FUJ; 9	BAH; 12			38	12th
2022	(United Kingdom) GR Racing	LMGTE Am	(United Kingdom) Ben Barker (Italy) Riccardo Pera (United Kingdom) Michael Wainwright	86	SEB	SPA; 6	LMN; 4	MON; 12	FUJ; 12	BAH; 6			50	10th
2023	(Germany) Project 1 – AO	LMGTE Am	(Italy) Matteo Cairoli (United States) Gunnar Jeannette (Portugal) Guilherme Oliveira (Portugal) Miguel Ramos (Dominican Republic) Efrin Castro	56	SEB; 12	POR; 6	SPA; WD	LMN; 7	MZA; 8	FUJ; 5	BHR; 10		36	11th
2023	(Italy) Iron Lynx	LMGTE Am	(Italy) Matteo Cressoni (Belgium) Alessio Picariello (Italy) Claudio Schiavoni	60	SEB; 6	POR; 12	SPA; 11	LMN; Ret	MZA; 2	FUJ; 11	BHR; Ret		30	13
2023	(Italy) Iron Dames	LMGTE Am	(Belgium) Sarah Bovy (Switzerland) Rahel Frey (Denmark) Michelle Gatting	85	**SEB**; **8**	POR; 3	SPA; 5	LMN; 4	**MZA**; **5**	FUJ; 4	BHR; 1		118	2nd
2023	(Germany) Dempsey-Proton Racing	LMGTE Am	(France) Julien Andlauer (Germany) Christian Ried (Denmark) Mikkel O. Pedersen	77	SEB; 2	POR; 7	SPA; 9	LMN; Ret	MZA; 1	FUJ; 6	BHR; 6		80	4th
2023	(Germany) Proton Competition	LMGTE Am	(United Kingdom) Harry Tincknell (United States) Ryan Hardwick (Canada) Zacharie Robichon (Germany) Jonas Ried (United States) Don Yount	88	SEB; WD	POR; 9	SPA; 4	LMN; Ret	MZA	FUJ	BHR		14	14th
2023	(United Kingdom) GR Racing	LMGTE Am	(United Kingdom) Ben Barker (Italy) Riccardo Pera (United Kingdom) Michael Wainwright	86	SEB; 7	POR; 11	SPA; 12	LMN; 3	MZA; 3	FUJ; 8	BHR; 8		64	6th

=== Complete IMSA SportsCar Championship results ===
(key) Races in bold indicates pole position. Races in italics indicates fastest lap. (key) Races in bold indicates pole position. Races in italics indicates fastest lap.

Complete IMSA SportsCar Championship results
Year	Entrant	Class	Drivers	No.	Rds.	Rounds												Pts.	Pos.
Year	Entrant	Class	Drivers	No.	Rds.	1	2	3	4	5	6	7	8	9	10	11	12	Pts.	Pos.
2020	(United States) Porsche GT Team	GTLM	(France) Frédéric Makowiecki (United Kingdom) Nick Tandy (Australia) Matt Campbell (New Zealand) Earl Bamber	911	1–6, 8–11; 1–6, 8–11; 1, 9; 11	**DAY 1**; **3**	DAY 2; 3	SEB 1; 6	ELK; 4	**VIR**; **3**	**ATL 1**; **4**	MOH	CLT; 5	ATL 2; 1	LGA; 3	SEB 2; 1		297	5th
2020	(United States) Porsche GT Team	GTLM	(New Zealand) Earl Bamber (Belgium) Laurens Vanthoor (France) Mathieu Jaminet (Switzerland) Neel Jani	912	1–6, 8–11; 1–6, 8–11; 1, 9; 11	DAY 1; 2	DAY 2; 2	SEB 1; 3	**ELK**; **5**	VIR; 5	ATL 1; 6	MOH	CLT; 6	ATL 2; 5	LGA; 1	SEB 2; 2		289	6th
2021	(United States) WeatherTech Racing	GTLM	(United States) Cooper MacNeil (Australia) Matt Campbell (France) Mathieu Jaminet (France) Kévin Estre (Italy) Gianmaria Bruni (Austria) Richard Lietz	79	1-2,5-12; 2, 5–6, 8–9, 12; 2, 5, 7, 10, 12; 1, 11; 1; 1	DAY 1; 3	DAY 2; 6	SEB; 1	BEL	WGL 1; 5	WGL 2; 3	LIM; 3	ELK; 1	LGA; 3	LBH; 3	VIR; 3	ATL; 1	3356	3rd
2021	(United States) WeatherTech Racing	GTLM	(France) Frédéric Makowiecki (France) Kévin Estre (Denmark) Michael Christensen	97	12; 12; 12	DAY 1	DAY 2	SEB	BEL	WGL 1	WGL 2	LIM	ELK	LGA	LBH	VIR	ATL; 2	348	11th

=== Complete European Le Mans Series results ===
(key) Races in bold indicates pole position. Races in italics indicates fastest lap.

Year	Entrant	Class	Drivers	No.	Rounds						Pts.	Pos.
Year	Entrant	Class	Drivers	No.	1	2	3	4	5	6	Pts.	Pos.
2021	(United States) WeatherTech Racing	LMGTE	(Germany) Christian Ried (Italy) Gianmaria Bruni (New Zealand) Jaxon Evans (United States) Cooper MacNeil (Australia) Matt Campbell	77	**CAT** **2**	RBR 6	LEC 4	MNZ 9	SPA 7	POR 5	57	5th
2021	(Germany) Proton Competition	LMGTE	(Republic of Ireland) Michael Fassbender (Austria) Richard Lietz (Germany) Felipe Fernández Laser (New Zealand) Jaxon Evans	93	CAT 6	RBR 4	LEC 8	MNZ 7	**SPA** **4**	POR 2	61	4th
2022	(Hong Kong) Absolute Racing	LMGTE	(Indonesia) Andrew Haryanto (Belgium) Alessio Picariello (Estonia) Martin Rump	18	LEC 8	IMO Ret	MNZ 4	CAT 5	SPA 3	POR 6	49	6th
2022	(Germany) Proton Competition	LMGTE	(Italy) Gianmaria Bruni (Italy) Lorenzo Ferrari (Germany) Christian Ried	77	LEC 2	IMO Ret	**MNZ** **2**	CAT 1	SPA 5	POR 5	82	1st
2022	(Germany) Proton Competition	LMGTE	(Republic of Ireland) Michael Fassbender (Austria) Richard Lietz (Canada) Zacharie Robichon	93	LEC 3	IMO 7	MNZ Ret	CAT 8	SPA 7	POR 8	35	11th
2023	(Germany) Proton Competition	LMGTE	(United States) Ryan Hardwick (Belgium) Alessio Picariello (Canada) Zacharie Robichon	16	CAT 1	LEC 9	ARA 2	**SPA** **3**	ALG 2	**POR** **1**	105	1st
2023	(Germany) Proton Competition	LMGTE	(France) Julien Andlauer (Italy) Giammarco Levorato (Germany) Christian Ried	77	CAT Ret	**LEC** **1**	ARA 4	SPA 8	ALG 1	POR 2	85	2nd
2023	(Germany) Proton Competition	LMGTE	(Republic of Ireland) Michael Fassbender (Austria) Richard Lietz (Estonia) Martin Rump	93	CAT 8	LEC 10	ARA 3	SPA Ret	ALG 9	POR 11	22	11th
2023	(Italy) Iron Lynx	LMGTE	(Italy) Matteo Cairoli (Italy) Matteo Cressoni (Italy) Claudio Schiavoni	60	CAT 4	LEC 2	ARA 7	SPA 1	ALG 3	POR 8	80	3rd
