= 2021 8 Hours of Bahrain =

Sports car endurance race

Coordinates: 26°1′57″N 50°30′38″E

Event information
- Round 6 of 6 in the 2021 FIA World Endurance Championship
- Date: 6 November 2021
- Location: Sakhir
- Venue: Bahrain International Circuit
- Duration: 8 Hours

Results
- Laps completed: 247
- Distance (km): 1336.764
- Distance (miles): 830.661
- Hypercar

Pole position
- Time: 1:46.250
- Team: (Japan) Toyota Gazoo Racing

Winners
- Team: (Japan) Toyota Gazoo Racing
- Drivers: (Switzerland) Sébastien Buemi (Japan) Kazuki Nakajima (New Zealand) Brendon Hartley
- LMP2

Winners
- Team: (Belgium) Team WRT
- Drivers: (Netherlands) Robin Frijns (Austria) Ferdinand Habsburg (France) Charles Milesi
- LMP2 Pro-Am

Winners
- Team: (Netherlands) Racing Team Nederland
- Drivers: (Netherlands) Frits van Eerd (Netherlands) Giedo van der Garde (Netherlands) Job van Uitert
- LMGTE Pro

Winners
- Team: (Italy) AF Corse
- Drivers: (United Kingdom) James Calado (Italy) Alessandro Pier Guidi
- LMGTE Am

Winners
- Team: (Italy) AF Corse
- Drivers: (France) François Perrodo (Denmark) Nicklas Nielsen (Italy) Alessio Rovera

The 2021 8 Hours of Bahrain was an endurance sportscar racing event held on 6 November 2021, as the sixth and final round of the 2021 FIA World Endurance Championship. It was the tenth running of the 8 Hours of Bahrain, and the third running in an extended 8 hours format.

== Qualifying ==
=== Qualifying results ===
Pole position winners in each class are marked in bold.

Pos.	Class	No.	Team	Time	Gap	Grid
1	**Hypercar**	**7**	**(Japan) Toyota Gazoo Racing**	**1:46.250**	-	**1**
2	Hypercar	8	(Japan) Toyota Gazoo Racing	1:46.540	+0.290	2
3	Hypercar	36	(France) Alpine Elf Matmut	1:47.025	+0.775	3
4	**LMP2**	**22**	**(United Kingdom) United Autosports USA**	**1:49.525**	**+3.275**	**4**
5	**LMP2 Pro-Am**	**70**	**(Switzerland) Realteam Racing**	**1:49.819**	**+3.569**	**5**
6	LMP2	38	(United Kingdom) JOTA	1:49.910	+3.660	6
7	LMP2 Pro-Am	29	(Netherlands) Racing Team Nederland	1:50.149	+3.899	7
8	LMP2 Pro-Am	20	(Denmark) High Class Racing	1:50.372	+4.122	8
9	LMP2	1	(France) Richard Mille Racing Team	1:50.744	+4.494	9
10	LMP2	31	(Belgium) Team WRT	1:51.063	+4.813	10
11	LMP2 Pro-Am	21	(United States) DragonSpeed USA	1:51.134	+4.884	11
12	LMP2	28	(United Kingdom) JOTA	1:51.145	+4.895	12
13	LMP2	34	(Poland) Inter Europol Competition	1:51.187	+4.937	13
14	LMP2 Pro-Am	44	(Slovakia) ARC Bratislava	1:51.424	+5.174	14
15	**LMGTE Pro**	**92**	**(Germany) Porsche GT Team**	**1:56.041**	**+9.791**	**15**
16	LMGTE Pro	51	(Italy) AF Corse	1:56.201	+9.951	16
17	LMGTE Pro	91	(Germany) Porsche GT Team	1:56.541	+10.291	17
18	LMGTE Pro	52	(Italy) AF Corse	1:56.603	+10.353	18
19	**LMGTE Am**	**47**	**(Italy) Cetilar Racing**	**1:58.712**	**+12.462**	**19**
20	LMGTE Am	83	(Italy) AF Corse	1:58.759	+12.509	20
21	LMGTE Am	85	(Italy) Iron Lynx	1:58.958	+12.708	21
22	LMGTE Am	56	(Germany) Team Project 1	1:58.989	+12.739	22
23	LMGTE Am	33	(United Kingdom) TF Sport	1:59.087	+12.837	23
24	LMGTE Am	98	(United Kingdom) Aston Martin Racing	1:59.096	+12.846	24
25	LMGTE Am	88	(Germany) Dempsey-Proton Racing	1:59.359	+13.109	25
26	LMGTE Am	54	(Italy) AF Corse	1:59.492	+13.242	26
27	LMGTE Am	77	(Germany) Dempsey-Proton Racing	1:59.936	+13.686	27
28	LMGTE Am	57	(Switzerland) Kessel Racing	2:00.301	+14.051	28
29	LMGTE Am	777	(Japan) D'station Racing	2:00.364	+14.114	29
30	LMGTE Am	86	(United Kingdom) GR Racing	2:01.282	+15.032	30
31	LMGTE Am	60	(Italy) Iron Lynx	2:01.941	+15.691	31

== Race ==
=== Race result ===
The minimum number of laps for classification (70% of the overall winning car's distance) was 172 laps. Class winners are denoted in bold and ‡.

Pos.	Class	No.	Team	Drivers	Chassis	Tyre	Laps	Time/Retired
Pos.	Class	No.	Team	Drivers	Engine	Tyre	Laps	Time/Retired
1	**Hypercar**	**8**	**(Japan) Toyota Gazoo Racing**	**(Switzerland) Sébastien Buemi** **(Japan) Kazuki Nakajima** **(New Zealand) Brendon Hartley**	**Toyota GR010 Hybrid**	M	**247**	**8:01:25.441** ‡
1	**Hypercar**	**8**	**(Japan) Toyota Gazoo Racing**	**(Switzerland) Sébastien Buemi** **(Japan) Kazuki Nakajima** **(New Zealand) Brendon Hartley**	**Toyota 3.5 L Turbo V6**	M	**247**	**8:01:25.441** ‡
2	Hypercar	7	(Japan) Toyota Gazoo Racing	(United Kingdom) Mike Conway (Japan) Kamui Kobayashi (Argentina) José María López	Toyota GR010 Hybrid	M	247	+7.351
2	Hypercar	7	(Japan) Toyota Gazoo Racing	(United Kingdom) Mike Conway (Japan) Kamui Kobayashi (Argentina) José María López	Toyota 3.5 L Turbo V6	M	247	+7.351
3	Hypercar	36	(France) Alpine Elf Matmut	(Brazil) André Negrão (France) Nicolas Lapierre (France) Matthieu Vaxivière	Alpine A480	M	241	+6 laps
3	Hypercar	36	(France) Alpine Elf Matmut	(Brazil) André Negrão (France) Nicolas Lapierre (France) Matthieu Vaxivière	Gibson GL458 4.5 L V8	M	241	+6 laps
4	**LMP2**	**31**	(Belgium) **Team WRT**	(Netherlands) **Robin Frijns** **(Austria) Ferdinand Habsburg** **(France) Charles Milesi**	**Oreca 07**	G	**240**	**+7 laps** ‡
4	**LMP2**	**31**	(Belgium) **Team WRT**	(Netherlands) **Robin Frijns** **(Austria) Ferdinand Habsburg** **(France) Charles Milesi**	**Gibson GK428 4.2 L V8**	G	**240**	**+7 laps** ‡
5	LMP2	38	(United Kingdom) JOTA	(Mexico) Roberto González (Portugal) António Félix da Costa (United Kingdom) Anthony Davidson	Oreca 07	G	240	+7 laps
5	LMP2	38	(United Kingdom) JOTA	(Mexico) Roberto González (Portugal) António Félix da Costa (United Kingdom) Anthony Davidson	Gibson GK428 4.2 L V8	G	240	+7 laps
6	LMP2	28	(United Kingdom) JOTA	(Indonesia) Sean Gelael (Belgium) Stoffel Vandoorne (United Kingdom) Tom Blomqvist	Oreca 07	G	240	+7 laps
6	LMP2	28	(United Kingdom) JOTA	(Indonesia) Sean Gelael (Belgium) Stoffel Vandoorne (United Kingdom) Tom Blomqvist	Gibson GK428 4.2 L V8	G	240	+7 laps
7	LMP2	22	(United Kingdom) United Autosports USA	(United Kingdom) Philip Hanson (Switzerland) Fabio Scherer (Portugal) Filipe Albuquerque	Oreca 07	G	240	+7 laps
7	LMP2	22	(United Kingdom) United Autosports USA	(United Kingdom) Philip Hanson (Switzerland) Fabio Scherer (Portugal) Filipe Albuquerque	Gibson GK428 4.2 L V8	G	240	+7 laps
8	LMP2	34	(Poland) Inter Europol Competition	(Poland) Jakub Śmiechowski (Netherlands) Renger van der Zande (United Kingdom) Alex Brundle	Oreca 07	G	238	+9 laps
8	LMP2	34	(Poland) Inter Europol Competition	(Poland) Jakub Śmiechowski (Netherlands) Renger van der Zande (United Kingdom) Alex Brundle	Gibson GK428 4.2 L V8	G	238	+9 laps
9	**LMP2 Pro-Am**	**29**	**(Netherlands) Racing Team Nederland**	**(Netherlands) Frits van Eerd** **(Netherlands) Giedo van der Garde** **(Netherlands) Job van Uitert**	**Oreca 07**	G	**238**	**+9 laps** ‡
9	**LMP2 Pro-Am**	**29**	**(Netherlands) Racing Team Nederland**	**(Netherlands) Frits van Eerd** **(Netherlands) Giedo van der Garde** **(Netherlands) Job van Uitert**	**Gibson GK428 4.2 L V8**	G	**238**	**+9 laps** ‡
10	LMP2 Pro-Am	70	(Switzerland) Realteam Racing	(Switzerland) Esteban Garcia (France) Loïc Duval (France) Norman Nato	Oreca 07	G	238	+9 laps
10	LMP2 Pro-Am	70	(Switzerland) Realteam Racing	(Switzerland) Esteban Garcia (France) Loïc Duval (France) Norman Nato	Gibson GK428 4.2 L V8	G	238	+9 laps
11	LMP2 Pro-Am	20	(Denmark) High Class Racing	(Denmark) Dennis Andersen (Denmark) Anders Fjordbach (Poland) Robert Kubica	Oreca 07	G	237	+10 laps
11	LMP2 Pro-Am	20	(Denmark) High Class Racing	(Denmark) Dennis Andersen (Denmark) Anders Fjordbach (Poland) Robert Kubica	Gibson GK428 4.2 L V8	G	237	+10 laps
12	LMP2	1	(France) Richard Mille Racing Team	(Colombia) Tatiana Calderón (Germany) Sophia Flörsch (Netherlands) Beitske Visser	Oreca 07	G	237	+10 laps
12	LMP2	1	(France) Richard Mille Racing Team	(Colombia) Tatiana Calderón (Germany) Sophia Flörsch (Netherlands) Beitske Visser	Gibson GK428 4.2 L V8	G	237	+10 laps
13	LMP2 Pro-Am	21	(United States) DragonSpeed USA	(Sweden) Henrik Hedman (Colombia) Juan Pablo Montoya (United Kingdom) Ben Hanley	Oreca 07	G	236	+11 laps
13	LMP2 Pro-Am	21	(United States) DragonSpeed USA	(Sweden) Henrik Hedman (Colombia) Juan Pablo Montoya (United Kingdom) Ben Hanley	Gibson GK428 4.2 L V8	G	236	+11 laps
14	LMP2 Pro-Am	44	(Slovakia) ARC Bratislava	(Slovakia) Miro Konôpka (United Kingdom) Olli Caldwell (France) Nelson Panciatici	Oreca 07	G	235	+12 laps
14	LMP2 Pro-Am	44	(Slovakia) ARC Bratislava	(Slovakia) Miro Konôpka (United Kingdom) Olli Caldwell (France) Nelson Panciatici	Gibson GK428 4.2 L V8	G	235	+12 laps
15	**LMGTE Pro**	**51**	**(Italy) AF Corse**	**(Italy) Alessandro Pier Guidi** **(United Kingdom) James Calado**	**Ferari 488 GTE Evo**	M	**233**	**+14 laps** ‡
15	**LMGTE Pro**	**51**	**(Italy) AF Corse**	**(Italy) Alessandro Pier Guidi** **(United Kingdom) James Calado**	**Ferrari F154CB 3.9 L Turbo V8**	M	**233**	**+14 laps** ‡
16	LMGTE Pro	92	(Germany) Porsche GT Team	(France) Kévin Estre (Switzerland) Neel Jani (Denmark) Michael Christensen	Porsche 911 RSR-19	M	233	+14 laps
16	LMGTE Pro	92	(Germany) Porsche GT Team	(France) Kévin Estre (Switzerland) Neel Jani (Denmark) Michael Christensen	Porsche 4.2 L Flat-6	M	233	+14 laps
17	LMGTE Pro	52	(Italy) AF Corse	(Brazil) Daniel Serra (Spain) Miguel Molina	Ferari 488 GTE Evo	M	233	+14 laps
17	LMGTE Pro	52	(Italy) AF Corse	(Brazil) Daniel Serra (Spain) Miguel Molina	Ferrari F154CB 3.9 L Turbo V8	M	233	+14 laps
18	LMGTE Pro	91	(Germany) Porsche GT Team	(Italy) Gianmaria Bruni (Austria) Richard Lietz (France) Frédéric Makowiecki	Porsche 911 RSR-19	M	231	+16 laps
18	LMGTE Pro	91	(Germany) Porsche GT Team	(Italy) Gianmaria Bruni (Austria) Richard Lietz (France) Frédéric Makowiecki	Porsche 4.2 L Flat-6	M	231	+16 laps
19	**LMGTE Am**	**83**	**(Italy) AF Corse**	**(France) François Perrodo** **(Denmark) Nicklas Nielsen** **(Italy) Alessio Rovera**	**Ferrari 488 GTE Evo**	M	**230**	**+17 laps** ‡
19	**LMGTE Am**	**83**	**(Italy) AF Corse**	**(France) François Perrodo** **(Denmark) Nicklas Nielsen** **(Italy) Alessio Rovera**	**Ferrari F154CB 3.9 L Turbo V8**	M	**230**	**+17 laps** ‡
20	LMGTE Am	77	(Germany) Dempsey-Proton Racing	(Germany) Christian Ried (New Zealand) Jaxon Evans (Australia) Matt Campbell	Porsche 911 RSR-19	M	229	+18 laps
20	LMGTE Am	77	(Germany) Dempsey-Proton Racing	(Germany) Christian Ried (New Zealand) Jaxon Evans (Australia) Matt Campbell	Porsche 4.2 L Flat-6	M	229	+18 laps
21	LMGTE Am	56	(Germany) Team Project 1	(Norway) Egidio Perfetti (Italy) Matteo Cairoli (Italy) Riccardo Pera	Porsche 911 RSR-19	M	229	+18 laps
21	LMGTE Am	56	(Germany) Team Project 1	(Norway) Egidio Perfetti (Italy) Matteo Cairoli (Italy) Riccardo Pera	Porsche 4.2 L Flat-6	M	229	+18 laps
22	LMGTE Am	47	(Italy) Cetilar Racing	(Italy) Roberto Lacorte (Italy) Giorgio Sernagiotto (Italy) Antonio Fuoco	Ferrari 488 GTE Evo	M	229	+18 laps
22	LMGTE Am	47	(Italy) Cetilar Racing	(Italy) Roberto Lacorte (Italy) Giorgio Sernagiotto (Italy) Antonio Fuoco	Ferrari F154CB 3.9 L Turbo V8	M	229	+18 laps
23	LMGTE Am	57	(Switzerland) Kessel Racing	(Japan) Takeshi Kimura (Denmark) Mikkel Jensen (Australia) Scott Andrews	Ferrari 488 GTE Evo	M	228	+19 laps
23	LMGTE Am	57	(Switzerland) Kessel Racing	(Japan) Takeshi Kimura (Denmark) Mikkel Jensen (Australia) Scott Andrews	Ferrari F154CB 3.9 L Turbo V8	M	228	+19 laps
24	LMGTE Am	60	(Italy) Iron Lynx	(Italy) Claudio Schiavoni (Italy) Andrea Piccini (Italy) Matteo Cressoni	Ferrari 488 GTE Evo	M	228	+19 laps
24	LMGTE Am	60	(Italy) Iron Lynx	(Italy) Claudio Schiavoni (Italy) Andrea Piccini (Italy) Matteo Cressoni	Ferrari F154CB 3.9 L Turbo V8	M	228	+19 laps
25	LMGTE Am	54	(Italy) AF Corse	(Switzerland) Thomas Flohr (Italy) Francesco Castellacci (Italy) Giancarlo Fisichella	Ferrari 488 GTE Evo	M	227	+20 laps
25	LMGTE Am	54	(Italy) AF Corse	(Switzerland) Thomas Flohr (Italy) Francesco Castellacci (Italy) Giancarlo Fisichella	Ferrari F154CB 3.9 L Turbo V8	M	227	+20 laps
26	LMGTE Am	777	(Japan) D'station Racing	(Japan) Satoshi Hoshino (Japan) Tomonobu Fujii (United Kingdom) Andrew Watson	Aston Martin Vantage AMR	M	227	+20 laps
26	LMGTE Am	777	(Japan) D'station Racing	(Japan) Satoshi Hoshino (Japan) Tomonobu Fujii (United Kingdom) Andrew Watson	Aston Martin 4.0 L Turbo V8	M	227	+20 laps
27	LMGTE Am	85	(Italy) Iron Lynx	(Switzerland) Rahel Frey (Belgium) Sarah Bovy (United Kingdom) Katherine Legge	Ferrari 488 GTE Evo	M	225	+22 laps
27	LMGTE Am	85	(Italy) Iron Lynx	(Switzerland) Rahel Frey (Belgium) Sarah Bovy (United Kingdom) Katherine Legge	Ferrari F154CB 3.9 L Turbo V8	M	225	+22 laps
28	LMGTE Am	86	(United Kingdom) GR Racing	(United Kingdom) Michael Wainwright (United Kingdom) Ben Barker (United Kingdom) Tom Gamble	Porsche 911 RSR-19	M	224	+23 laps
28	LMGTE Am	86	(United Kingdom) GR Racing	(United Kingdom) Michael Wainwright (United Kingdom) Ben Barker (United Kingdom) Tom Gamble	Porsche 4.2 L Flat-6	M	224	+23 laps
29	LMGTE Am	98	(United Kingdom) Aston Martin Racing	(Canada) Paul Dalla Lana (Brazil) Augusto Farfus (Brazil) Marcos Gomes	Aston Martin Vantage AMR	M	223	+24 laps
29	LMGTE Am	98	(United Kingdom) Aston Martin Racing	(Canada) Paul Dalla Lana (Brazil) Augusto Farfus (Brazil) Marcos Gomes	Aston Martin 4.0 L Turbo V8	M	223	+24 laps
Ret	LMGTE Am	33	(United Kingdom) TF Sport	(United States) Ben Keating (Luxembourg) Dylan Pereira (Brazil) Felipe Fraga	Aston Martin Vantage AMR	M	128	retired
Ret	LMGTE Am	33	(United Kingdom) TF Sport	(United States) Ben Keating (Luxembourg) Dylan Pereira (Brazil) Felipe Fraga	Aston Martin 4.0 L Turbo V8	M	128	retired
Ret	LMGTE Am	88	(Germany) Dempsey-Proton Racing	(United Arab Emirates) Khaled Al Qubaisi (Zimbabwe) Axcil Jefferies (France) Julien Andlauer	Porsche 911 RSR-19	M	90	retired
Ret	LMGTE Am	88	(Germany) Dempsey-Proton Racing	(United Arab Emirates) Khaled Al Qubaisi (Zimbabwe) Axcil Jefferies (France) Julien Andlauer	Porsche 4.2 L Flat-6	M	90	retired
