= 2020 8 Hours of Bahrain =

Sports car endurance race held at Bahrain International Circuit, Sakhir, Bahrain

Coordinates: 26°1′57″N 50°30′38″E

Event information
- Round 8 of 8 in the 2019-20 FIA World Endurance Championship
- Date: 14 November 2019-20
- Location: Sakhir
- Venue: Bahrain International Circuit
- Duration: 8 Hours

Results
- Laps completed: 263
- Distance (km): 1423.356
- Distance (miles): 884.469
- LMP1

Pole position
- Team: (Japan) Toyota Gazoo Racing

Winners
- Team: (Japan) Toyota Gazoo Racing
- Drivers: (United Kingdom) Mike Conway (Japan) Kamui Kobayashi (Argentina) José María López
- LMP2

Winners
- Team: (China) Jackie Chan DC Racing
- Drivers: (France) Gabriel Aubry (United Kingdom) Will Stevens (China) Ho-Pin Tung
- LMGTE Pro

Winners
- Team: (Germany) Porsche GT Team
- Drivers: (Denmark) Michael Christensen (France) Kévin Estre
- LMGTE Am

Winners
- Team: (Germany) Team Project 1
- Drivers: (Germany) Jörg Bergmeister (Norway) Egidio Perfetti (Netherlands) Larry ten Voorde

The 2020 8 Hours of Bahrain was an endurance sportscar racing event that was held on 14 November 2020, as the season finale of the 2019–20 FIA World Endurance Championship. It was also the eighth running of the 8 Hours of Bahrain, and the second running in an extended 8 hours format. The race was won by the #7 Toyota TS050 Hybrid.

== Background ==
On 3 April 2020, a new revised calendar for the 2019–20 season was released, with another 8 Hours of Bahrain event, on 21 November 2020, replacing the cancelled 1000 Miles of Sebring. The final round at Bahrain in November was moved up a week as a result of Formula One scheduling a double header event at that venue for the end of the month.

== Results ==
=== Race ===
The minimum number of laps for classification (70% of the overall winning car's race distance) was 184 laps. Class winners are denoted in bold and with ‡.

Pos.	Class	No.	Team	Drivers	Chassis	Tyre	Laps	Time/Retired
Pos.	Class	No.	Team	Drivers	Engine	Tyre	Laps	Time/Retired
1	**LMP1**	**7**	**(Japan) Toyota Gazoo Racing**	**(United Kingdom) Mike Conway (Japan) Kamui Kobayashi (Argentina) José María López**	**Toyota TS050 Hybrid**	MI	**263**	**8:00:13.867‡**
1	**LMP1**	**7**	**(Japan) Toyota Gazoo Racing**	**(United Kingdom) Mike Conway (Japan) Kamui Kobayashi (Argentina) José María López**	**Toyota 2.4 L Turbo V6**	MI	**263**	**8:00:13.867‡**
2	LMP1	8	(Japan) Toyota Gazoo Racing	(Switzerland) Sébastien Buemi (New Zealand) Brendon Hartley (Japan) Kazuki Nakajima	Toyota TS050 Hybrid	MI	263	+1:04.594
2	LMP1	8	(Japan) Toyota Gazoo Racing	(Switzerland) Sébastien Buemi (New Zealand) Brendon Hartley (Japan) Kazuki Nakajima	Toyota 2.4 L Turbo V6	MI	263	+1:04.594
3	**LMP2**	**37**	**(China) Jackie Chan DC Racing**	**(France) Gabriel Aubry (United Kingdom) Will Stevens (China) Ho-Pin Tung**	**Oreca 07**	G	**247**	**+16 Laps‡**
3	**LMP2**	**37**	**(China) Jackie Chan DC Racing**	**(France) Gabriel Aubry (United Kingdom) Will Stevens (China) Ho-Pin Tung**	**Gibson GK428 4.2 L V8**	G	**247**	**+16 Laps‡**
4	LMP2	38	(United Kingdom) Jota Sport	(Portugal) António Félix da Costa (United Kingdom) Anthony Davidson (Mexico) Roberto González	Oreca 07	G	247	+16 Laps
4	LMP2	38	(United Kingdom) Jota Sport	(Portugal) António Félix da Costa (United Kingdom) Anthony Davidson (Mexico) Roberto González	Gibson GK428 4.2 L V8	G	247	+16 Laps
5	LMP2	29	(Netherlands) Racing Team Nederland	(Netherlands) Frits van Eerd (Netherlands) Giedo van der Garde (Netherlands) Nyck de Vries	Oreca 07	MI	247	+16 Laps
5	LMP2	29	(Netherlands) Racing Team Nederland	(Netherlands) Frits van Eerd (Netherlands) Giedo van der Garde (Netherlands) Nyck de Vries	Gibson GK428 4.2 L V8	MI	247	+16 Laps
6	LMP2	22	(United Kingdom) United Autosports	(Portugal) Filipe Albuquerque (United Kingdom) Philip Hanson (United Kingdom) Paul di Resta	Oreca 07	MI	247	+16 Laps
6	LMP2	22	(United Kingdom) United Autosports	(Portugal) Filipe Albuquerque (United Kingdom) Philip Hanson (United Kingdom) Paul di Resta	Gibson GK428 4.2 L V8	MI	247	+16 Laps
7	LMP2	36	(France) Signatech Alpine Elf	(France) Thomas Laurent (Brazil) André Negrão (France) Pierre Ragues	Alpine A470	MI	246	+17 Laps
7	LMP2	36	(France) Signatech Alpine Elf	(France) Thomas Laurent (Brazil) André Negrão (France) Pierre Ragues	Gibson GK428 4.2 L V8	MI	246	+17 Laps
8	**LMGTE; Pro**	**92**	**(Germany) Porsche GT Team**	**(Denmark) Michael Christensen (France) Kévin Estre**	**Porsche 911 RSR-19**	MI	**235**	**+28 Laps‡**
8	**LMGTE; Pro**	**92**	**(Germany) Porsche GT Team**	**(Denmark) Michael Christensen (France) Kévin Estre**	**Porsche 4.2 L Flat-6**	MI	**235**	**+28 Laps‡**
9	LMGTE; Pro	91	(Germany) Porsche GT Team	(Italy) Gianmaria Bruni (Austria) Richard Lietz	Porsche 911 RSR-19	MI	235	+28 Laps
9	LMGTE; Pro	91	(Germany) Porsche GT Team	(Italy) Gianmaria Bruni (Austria) Richard Lietz	Porsche 4.2 L Flat-6	MI	235	+28 Laps
10	LMGTE; Pro	71	(Italy) AF Corse	(Spain) Miguel Molina (Italy) Davide Rigon	Ferrari 488 GTE Evo	MI	235	+28 Laps
10	LMGTE; Pro	71	(Italy) AF Corse	(Spain) Miguel Molina (Italy) Davide Rigon	Ferrari F154CB 3.9 L Turbo V8	MI	235	+28 Laps
11	LMGTE; Pro	97	(United Kingdom) Aston Martin Racing	(Belgium) Maxime Martin (United Kingdom) Richard Westbrook	Aston Martin Vantage AMR	MI	234	+29 Laps
11	LMGTE; Pro	97	(United Kingdom) Aston Martin Racing	(Belgium) Maxime Martin (United Kingdom) Richard Westbrook	Aston Martin 4.0 L Turbo V8	MI	234	+29 Laps
12	LMGTE; Pro	95	(United Kingdom) Aston Martin Racing	(Denmark) Marco Sørensen (Denmark) Nicki Thiim	Aston Martin Vantage AMR	MI	233	+30 Laps
12	LMGTE; Pro	95	(United Kingdom) Aston Martin Racing	(Denmark) Marco Sørensen (Denmark) Nicki Thiim	Aston Martin 4.0 L Turbo V8	MI	233	+30 Laps
13	**LMGTE; Am**	**56**	**(Germany) Team Project 1**	**(Germany) Jörg Bergmeister (Norway) Egidio Perfetti (Netherlands) Larry ten Voorde**	**Porsche 911 RSR**	MI	**232**	**+31 Laps‡**
13	**LMGTE; Am**	**56**	**(Germany) Team Project 1**	**(Germany) Jörg Bergmeister (Norway) Egidio Perfetti (Netherlands) Larry ten Voorde**	**Porsche 4.0 L Flat-6**	MI	**232**	**+31 Laps‡**
14	LMGTE; Am	83	(Italy) AF Corse	(France) Emmanuel Collard (Denmark) Nicklas Nielsen (France) François Perrodo	Ferrari 488 GTE Evo	MI	232	+31 Laps
14	LMGTE; Am	83	(Italy) AF Corse	(France) Emmanuel Collard (Denmark) Nicklas Nielsen (France) François Perrodo	Ferrari F154CB 3.9 L Turbo V8	MI	232	+31 Laps
15	LMGTE; Am	88	(Germany) Dempsey-Proton Racing	(United Arab Emirates) Khaled Al Qubaisi (New Zealand) Jaxon Evans (Germany) Marco Holzer	Porsche 911 RSR	MI	232	+31 Laps
15	LMGTE; Am	88	(Germany) Dempsey-Proton Racing	(United Arab Emirates) Khaled Al Qubaisi (New Zealand) Jaxon Evans (Germany) Marco Holzer	Porsche 4.0 L Flat-6	MI	232	+31 Laps
16	LMGTE; Am	54	(Italy) AF Corse	(Italy) Francesco Castellacci (Italy) Giancarlo Fisichella (Switzerland) Thomas Flohr	Ferrari 488 GTE Evo	MI	232	+31 Laps
16	LMGTE; Am	54	(Italy) AF Corse	(Italy) Francesco Castellacci (Italy) Giancarlo Fisichella (Switzerland) Thomas Flohr	Ferrari F154CB 3.9 L Turbo V8	MI	232	+31 Laps
17	LMGTE; AM	86	(United Kingdom) Gulf Racing	(United Kingdom) Ben Barker (Belgium) Alessio Picariello (United Kingdom) Michael Wainwright	Porsche 911 RSR	MI	232	+31 Laps
17	LMGTE; AM	86	(United Kingdom) Gulf Racing	(United Kingdom) Ben Barker (Belgium) Alessio Picariello (United Kingdom) Michael Wainwright	Porsche 4.0 L Flat-6	MI	232	+31 Laps
18	LMGTE; AM	57	(Germany) Team Project 1	(Netherlands) Jeroen Bleekemolen (United States) Ben Keating (Luxembourg) Dylan Pereira	Porsche 911 RSR	MI	231	+32 Laps
18	LMGTE; AM	57	(Germany) Team Project 1	(Netherlands) Jeroen Bleekemolen (United States) Ben Keating (Luxembourg) Dylan Pereira	Porsche 4.0 L Flat-6	MI	231	+32 Laps
19	LMGTE; Pro	51	(Italy) AF Corse	(United Kingdom) James Calado (Brazil) Daniel Serra	Ferrari 488 GTE Evo	MI	231	+32 Laps
19	LMGTE; Pro	51	(Italy) AF Corse	(United Kingdom) James Calado (Brazil) Daniel Serra	Ferrari F154CB 3.9 L Turbo V8	MI	231	+32 Laps
20	LMGTE; Am	77	(Germany) Dempsey-Proton Racing	(Norway) Dennis Olsen (Italy) Riccardo Pera (Germany) Christian Ried	Porsche 911 RSR	MI	231	+32 Laps
20	LMGTE; Am	77	(Germany) Dempsey-Proton Racing	(Norway) Dennis Olsen (Italy) Riccardo Pera (Germany) Christian Ried	Porsche 4.0 L Flat-6	MI	231	+32 Laps
21	LMGTE; Am	90	(United Kingdom) TF Sport	(United Kingdom) Jonathan Adam (Republic of Ireland) Charlie Eastwood (Turkey) Salih Yoluç	Aston Martin Vantage AMR	MI	231	+32 Laps
21	LMGTE; Am	90	(United Kingdom) TF Sport	(United Kingdom) Jonathan Adam (Republic of Ireland) Charlie Eastwood (Turkey) Salih Yoluç	Aston Martin 4.0 L Turbo V8	MI	231	+32 Laps
22	LMGTE; Am	98	(United Kingdom) Aston Martin Racing	(Canada) Paul Dalla Lana (United Kingdom) Ross Gunn (Portugal) Pedro Lamy	Aston Martin Vantage AMR	MI	231	+32 Laps
22	LMGTE; Am	98	(United Kingdom) Aston Martin Racing	(Canada) Paul Dalla Lana (United Kingdom) Ross Gunn (Portugal) Pedro Lamy	Aston Martin 4.0 L Turbo V8	MI	231	+32 Laps
23	LMGTE; Am	62	(United Kingdom) Red River Sport	(Japan) Kei Cozzolino (United Kingdom) Bonamy Grimes (United Kingdom) Colin Noble	Ferrari 488 GTE Evo	MI	231	+32 Laps
23	LMGTE; Am	62	(United Kingdom) Red River Sport	(Japan) Kei Cozzolino (United Kingdom) Bonamy Grimes (United Kingdom) Colin Noble	Ferrari F154CB 3.9 L Turbo V8	MI	231	+32 Laps
24	LMP2	47	(Italy) Cetilar Racing	(Italy) Andrea Belicchi (Italy) Roberto Lacorte (Italy) Giorgio Sernagiotto	Dallara P217	MI	231	+32 Laps
24	LMP2	47	(Italy) Cetilar Racing	(Italy) Andrea Belicchi (Italy) Roberto Lacorte (Italy) Giorgio Sernagiotto	Gibson GK428 4.2 L V8	MI	231	+32 Laps
BOX SCORE
