= Giorgio Sernagiotto =

Italian racing driver (born 1981)

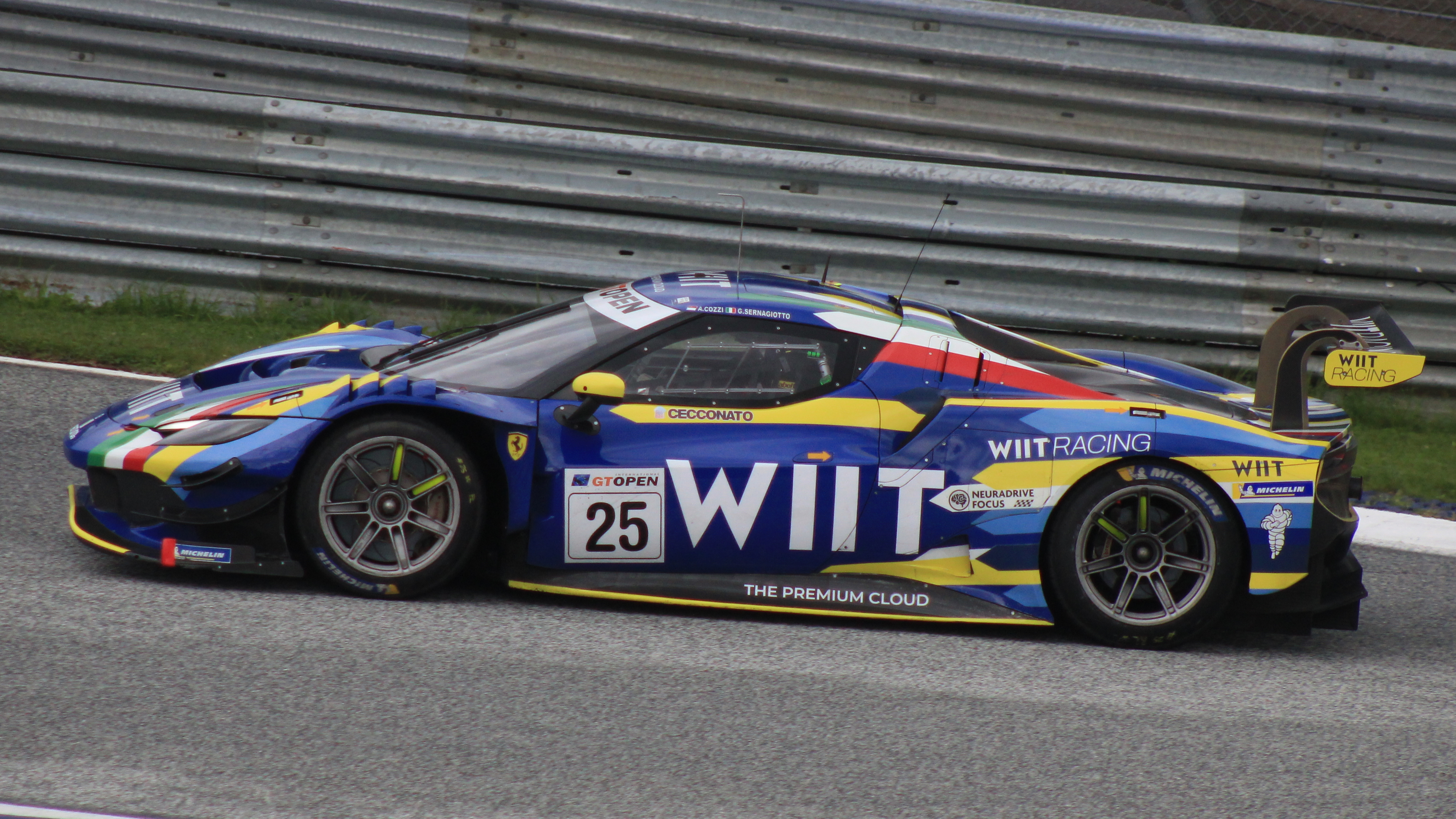
- Sernagiotto in 2024
- Nationality: (Italy) Italian
- Born: 28 July 1981 (age 45) Caerano San Marco, Italy
- Categorisation: FIA Silver

Championship titles
- 2019 2009 2006 2001 2000: Italian GT Sprint Championship - GT Light; Ferrari Challenge Italy - Trofeo Pirelli; Ferrari Challenge World Finals; Formula Ford 1800 Italy; Formula Ford 1600 Italy

Giorgio Sernagiotto (born 28 July 1981 in Caerano San Marco) is an Italian racing driver who last raced in the GTD class of the IMSA SportsCar Championship for Cetilar Racing. He is the 2006 Ferrari Challenge world champion, as well as a 12 Hours of Sebring class winner and FIA WEC race winner.

== Early career ==
=== Karting and junior formulae ===
Starting his karting career in 1994, Sernagiotto was the best student at Henry Morrogh's driver school in 1999. Stepping up to single-seaters in 2000, Sernagiotto won that year's Formula Ford 1600 Italy championship and won Formula Ford 1800 Italy the following year.

=== Ferrari Challenge ===
Having left single-seaters following 2004, Sernagiotto raced in Ferrari Challenge, where he won the 2006 World Finals and the 2009 Trofeo Pirelli in the Italian Series.

=== Trofeo Maserati ===
Sernagiotto also competed in Trofeo Maserati World Series from 2012 to 2015, winning the last ever race of the series before it shut down.

== Endurance racing ==
Having met Roberto Lacorte while working as a coach for AF Corse, Sernagiotto received a call from the former, who aimed to compete in the 24 Hours of Le Mans and felt Sernagiotto was the right person who could help him reach his goal.

=== LMP3 (2015–2016) ===
After a brief spell in V de V Challenge Endurance where he drove with Lacorte and Enrique Bernoldi, Sernagiotto joined Villorba Corse to race in the LMP3 class of the 2015 European Le Mans Series to begin Lacorte's "Road to Le Mans" project. In their first season in the championship, the pair scored two second-place finishes, at the Red Bull Ring and Paul Ricard, ending the season seventh in the teams' standings.

The pair returned to Villorba Corse for the 2016 season as the team switched from Ginetta to Ligier. During a difficult season in ELMS, the pairing also competed in the first edition of the Road to Le Mans, where they finished 17th.

=== LMP2 and GT3 debut (2017–2020) ===
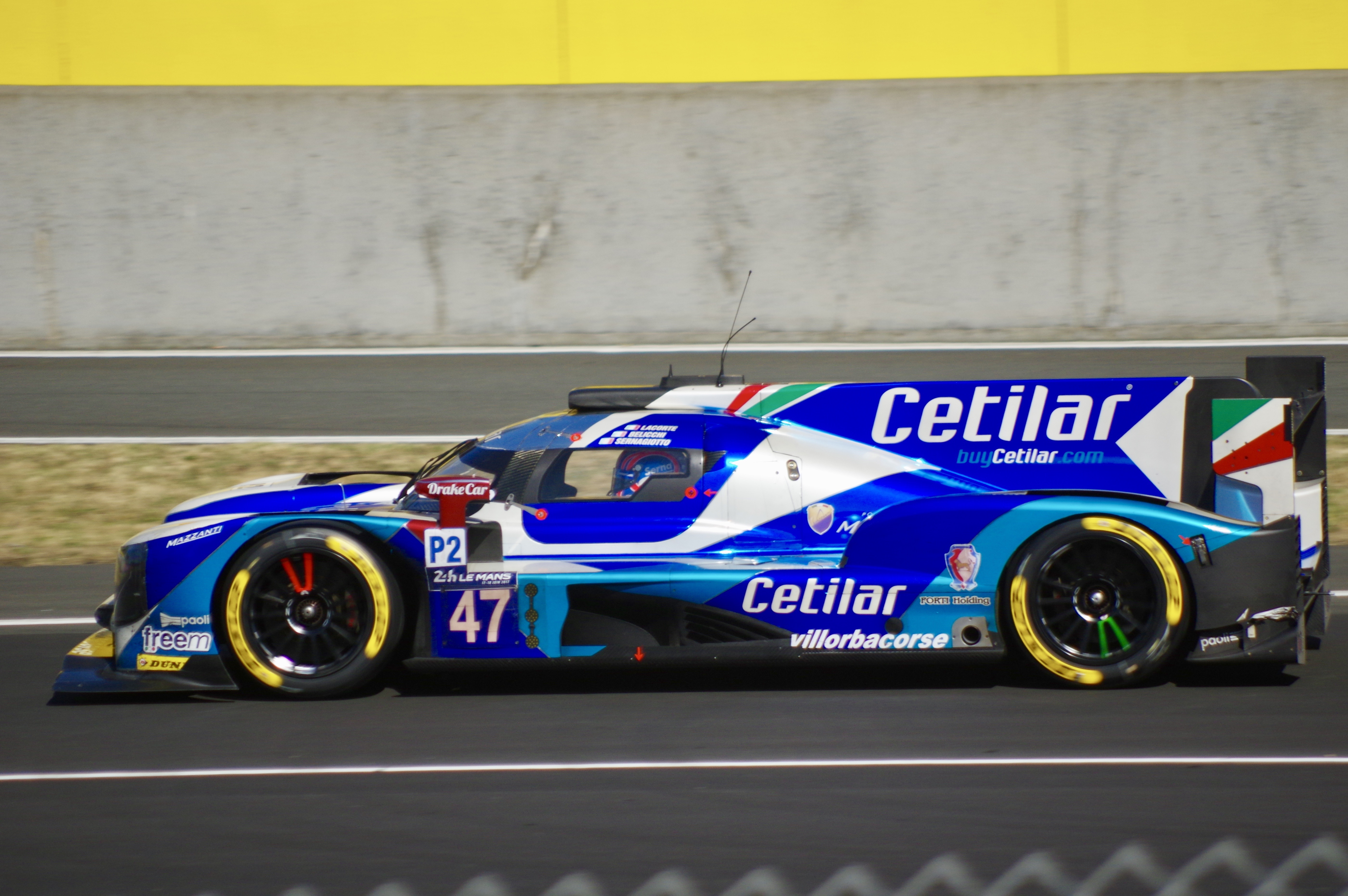
Sernagiotto at the 2017 24 Hours of Le Mans

Sernagiotto stepped up to LMP2 for 2017 as Cetilar Villorba Corse fielded one of four Dallara P217s. Scoring two top-five finishes, he finished 14th in the drivers' standings. During 2017, Sernagiotto also made his 24 Hours of Le Mans debut, where he finished ninth overall and seventh in LMP2.

In 2018, Sernagiotto stayed with Cetilar Villorba Corse in European Le Mans Series and made his second trip to Le Mans. In a difficult sophomore season where his team scored a best result of ninth in ELMS and 11th at Le Mans, Sernagiotto also made his Le Mans Cup debut, racing for Kessel Racing in the GT3 class alongside Manuela Gostner.

In early 2019 it was announced that Sernagiotto was going to make his full season debut in the FIA World Endurance Championship, staying with Cetilar Racing. In WEC's "superseason", they scored a best result of fifth twice and ended the season 12th in the standings. He also competed for Iron Lynx in the GT Light class of the Italian GT Endurance Championship, where he won the title after taking seven wins in eight races.

=== Switching focus to GT racing (2021–present) ===
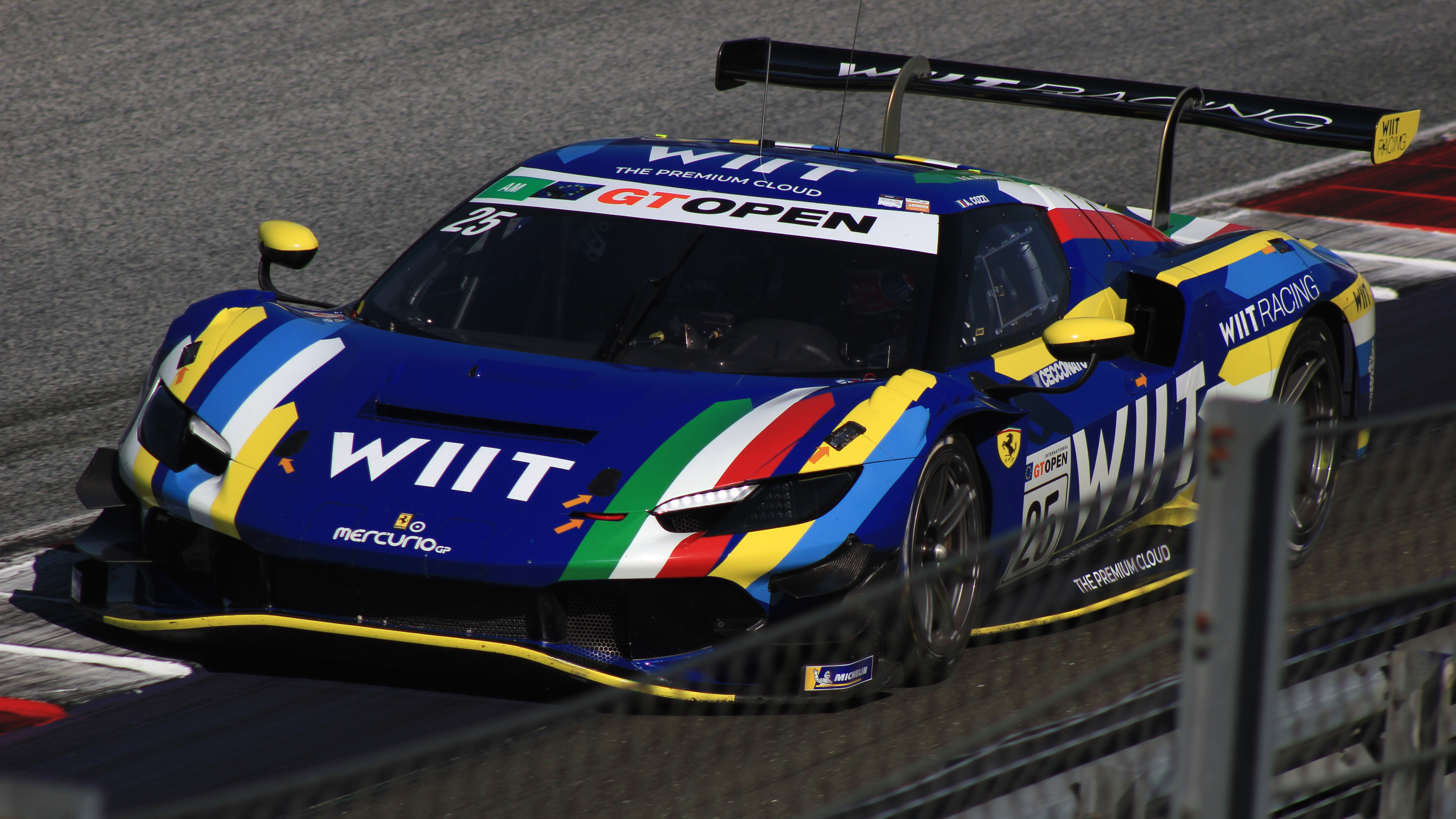
Sernagiotto at the Red Bull Ring round of the 2023 International GT Open season

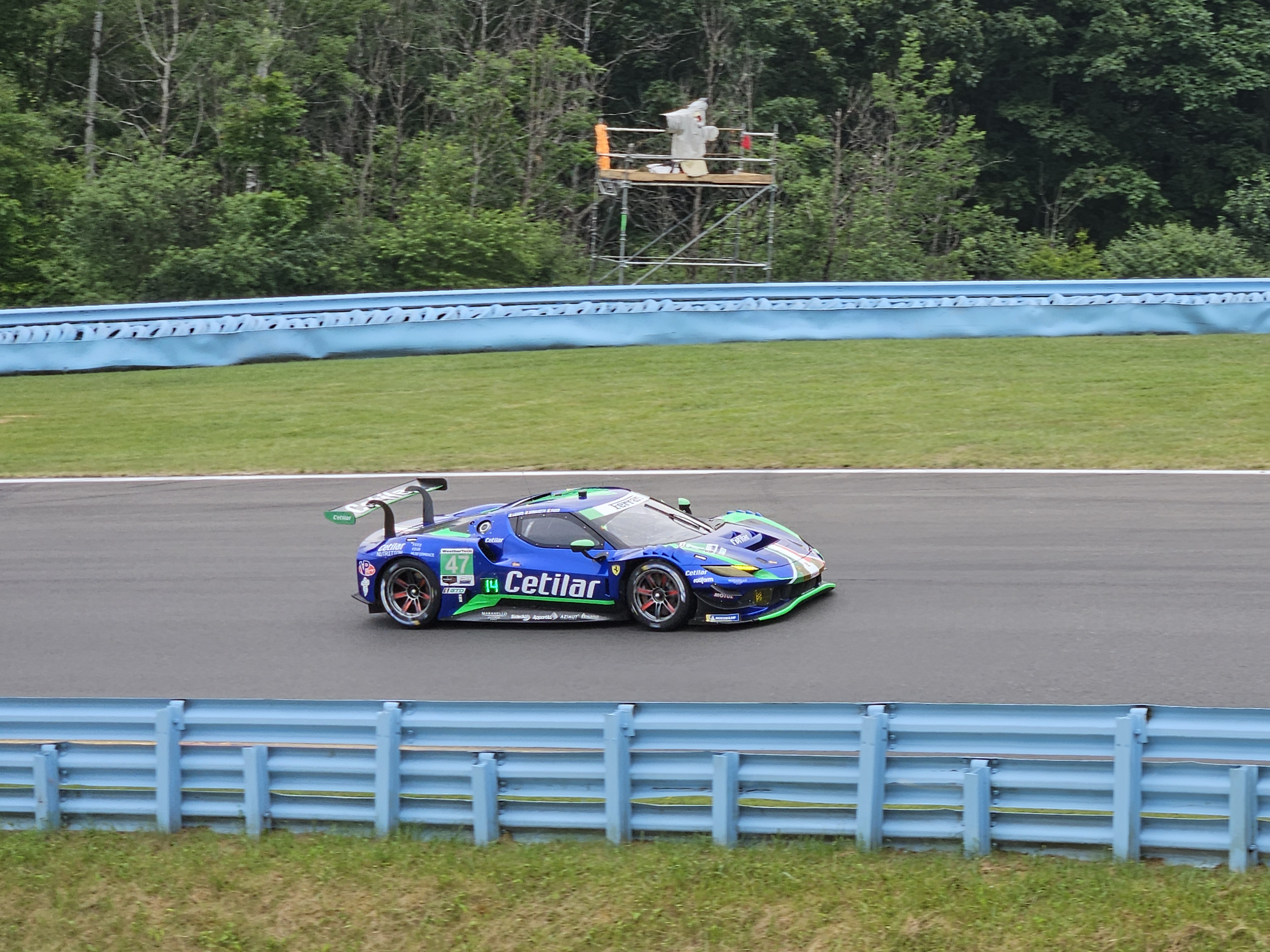
Sernagiotto at the Watkins Glen round of the 2024 IMSA SportsCar Championship season

Returning to WEC for the 2021 season, Sernagiotto took his first win in the championship at the 2021 8 Hours of Portimão and finished fifth in the LMGTE Am standings. Sernagiotto also raced for Iron Lynx in the European Le Mans Series. Paired up with Paolo Ruberti and Claudio Schiavoni, the trio finished eighth in the standings with a best finish of fifth, scored three times across the season.

At the start of 2022, Sernagiotto made his debut in the Gulf 12 Hours. Following various problems during the race, he finished fifth overall and fourth in class, commenting "There is no better way to start the season” in a post-race interview. Racing for Cetilar Racing in the Endurance rounds of the 2022 IMSA SportsCar Championship, Sernagiotto won the 12 Hours of Sebring and finished fourth at Watkins Glen. At the end of the year, Sernagiotto returned to the Gulf 12 Hours, where he finished third in class.

After finishing tenth in the 2022 Petit Le Mans, Sernagiotto confirmed he would be returning to Cetilar Racing, racing in the Endurance rounds of the 2023 IMSA SportsCar Championship. Scoring a best result of 13th at the Petit Le Mans, Sernagiotto finished 38th in the standings. In early 2023, Sernagiotto joined Alessandro Cozzi at AF Corse for the 2023 International GT Open season in the Am class. The duo won in their class at Algarve and Paul Ricard, finishing fifth in the Am standings at season's end.

On December 21, 2023 Cetilar Racing announced that Sernagiotto would rejoin Roberto Lacorte and Antonio Fuoco to compete in the Endurance Cup rounds of the 2024 IMSA SportsCar Championship. Sernagiotto scored his second podium in IMSA by finishing second in the Sebring 12 Hours, ending the season tenth in the Endurance Cup. During 2024, Sernagiotto and Cozzi returned to International GT Open, as they were promoted to the Pro-Am class. The pair won at Algarve and finished tenth in the Pro-Am standings. The following year, Sernagiotto returned to Cetilar Racing to race in select rounds of the IMSA SportsCar Championship in the GTD class, taking a best result of seventh at Watkins Glen.

== Personal life ==
Sernagiotto is the son of rally driver Renzo "Pippo" Sernagiotto (1943-2006), who founded Sernagiotto Auto in 1964 and also worked as a mechanic for Lancia in their development of the Delta HF. Sernagiotto is in a relationship with fellow racing driver Manuela Gostner.

== Karting record ==
=== Karting career summary ===
Season	Series	Team	Position
1995	25° Torneo delle Industrie - 100 Junior		8th
1996	Andrea Margutti Trophy - 100 Junior		8th
1996	26° Torneo delle Industrie - 100 Junior		6th
1998	Andrea Margutti Trophy - ICA		13th
1999	4° South Garda Winter Cup - ICA		3rd
1999	29° Torneo Industrie Open - ICA		4th
2000	Andrea Margutti Trophy - Formula A		10th

== Racing record ==
=== Racing career summary ===
Season	Series	Team	Races	Wins	Poles	F/Laps	Podiums	Points	Position
2000	Formula Ford 1600 Italy		9	6	??	??	??	??	**1st**
2001	Formula Renault 2000 Italia	Alan Racing Team	0	0	0	0	0	0	NC
2001	Formula Ford 1800 Italy		8	6	??	??	??	??	**1st**
2002	Formula Nissan 2000 Series	Venturini Racing	8	0	0	0	1	27	11th
2003	Italian Formula Three Championship	Azeta Racing	4	0	0	0	0	14	13th
2003	Formula Super Renault Argentina		1	0	0	0	0	2	22nd
2004	Formula Renault 2000 Italia	IT Loox Racing Car	17	0	0	0	0	11	19th
2005	Ferrari Challenge Italy - Coppa Shell	Forza Service	??	??	??	??	??	15	24th
2006	Ferrari Challenge Italy - Coppa Shell	Motor Modena	??	??	??	??	??	86	10th
2007	Ferrari Challenge Italy - Trofeo Pirelli	Motor	??	??	??	??	??	151	8th
2008	Ferrari Challenge Italy - Trofeo Pirelli	Motor	??	??	??	??	??	189	6th
2009	Ferrari Challenge Italy - Trofeo Pirelli		14	7	??	??	13	265	**1st**
2012	Trofeo Maserati World Series		8	5	4	??	6	168	5th
2012	Italian Touring Endurance Championship - S2000		??	??	??	??	??	90	4th
2013	V de V Challenge Endurance - Proto - Scratch	MSR Corse	4	0	0	0	1	37	27th
2014	V de V Challenge Endurance - Proto - Scratch	MSR Corse	3	0	0	0	0	12.5	38th
2014	6 Hours of Rome	MSR Corse	1	0	0	0	1	N/A	**2nd**
2014	Trofeo Maserati World Series		??	??	??	??	??	43	7th
2015	European Le Mans Series - LMP3	Villorba Corse	4	0	0	0	2	36	7th
2016	European Le Mans Series - LMP3	Villorba Corse	6	0	0	0	0	8	23rd
2016	Road to Le Mans - LMP3	Villorba Corse	1	0	0	0	0	N/A	17th
2016	GT4 European Series - Pro	Villorba Corse	3	1	0	0	1	51	11th
2017	European Le Mans Series - LMP2	Cetilar Villorba Corse	6	0	0	0	0	35	14th
2017	24 Hours of Le Mans - LMP2	Cetilar Villorba Corse	1	0	0	0	0	N/A	7th
2018	European Le Mans Series - LMP2	Cetilar Villorba Corse	6	0	0	0	0	4.5	25th
2018	24 Hours of Le Mans - LMP2	Cetilar Villorba Corse	1	0	0	0	0	N/A	11th
2018	Le Mans Cup - GT3	Kessel Racing	1	0	0	0	0	12	9th
2019	European Le Mans Series - LMP2	Cetilar Racing Villorba Corse	1	0	0	0	0	0	36th
2019	Italian GT Sprint Championship - GT Light	Iron Lynx	8	7	5	5	8	120	**1st**
2019–20	FIA World Endurance Championship - LMP2	Cetilar Racing	8	0	0	0	0	72	12th
2020	24H GT Series - GT3-Am	MP Racing	1	0	0	0	1	14	8th
2021	IMSA SportsCar Championship - LMP2	Cetilar Racing	1	0	0	0	0	11	16th
2021	FIA World Endurance Championship - LMGTE Am	Cetilar Racing	6	1	1	0	2	75	5th
2021	European Le Mans Series - LMGTE	Iron Lynx	6	0	0	0	0	50	8th
2021	24H GT Series - GT3-Am	MP Racing	1	0	0	0	0	33‡	9th‡
2021	Italian GT Sprint Championship - GT Cup	Formula Racing	2	1	0	0	1	0	NC†
2022	IMSA SportsCar Championship - GTD	Cetilar Racing	4	1	0	1	1	1101	22nd
2022	24H GT Series - GT3	MP Racing	1	0	0	0	0	13‡	21st‡
2022	Gulf 12 Hours - GT3 Pro-Am	AF Corse	1	0	0	0	0	N/A	4th
2022	Gulf 12 Hours - GT3 Am	AF Corse	1	0	0	0	0	N/A	**3rd**
2023	IMSA SportsCar Championship - GTD	Cetilar Racing	4	0	0	0	0	637	38th
2023	International GT Open	AF Corse	13	0	0	0	0	1	41st
2023	International GT Open - Am	AF Corse	13	2	0	0	6	59	5th
2023	Gulf 12 Hours - Pro-Am	AF Corse	1	0	0	0	0	N/A	4th
2024	IMSA SportsCar Championship - GTD	Cetilar Racing	5	0	1	0	1	1183	29th
2024	International GT Open	AF Corse	11	0	0	1	0	2	33rd
2024	International GT Open - Pro-Am	AF Corse	11	1	0	1	1	27	10th
2024	Gulf 12 Hours	AF Corse	1	0	0	0	0	N/A	6th
2025	IMSA SportsCar Championship - GTD	Cetilar Racing	2	0	0	0	0	411	49th

=== Complete European Le Mans Series results ===
(key) (Races in bold indicate pole position; results in italics indicate fastest lap)

Year	Entrant	Class	Chassis	Engine	1	2	3	4	5	6	Rank	Points
2015	Villorba Corse	LMP3	Ginetta-Juno LMP3	Nissan VK50 5L V8	SIL	IMO; Ret	RBR; 2	LEC; 2	EST; Ret		7th	36
2016	Villorba Corse	LMP3	Ligier JS P3	Nissan VK50VE 5.0 L V8	SIL; Ret	IMO; 16	RBR; 12	LEC; 10	SPA; 9	EST; 8	23rd	8
2017	Cetilar Villorba Corse	LMP2	Dallara P217	Gibson GK428 4.2 L V8	SIL; 6	MNZ; 5	RBR; Ret	LEC; 10	SPA; 7	ALG; 5	14th	35
2018	Cetilar Villorba Corse	LMP2	Dallara P217	Gibson GK428 4.2 L V8	LEC; 14	MNZ; 9	RBR; 11	SIL; 13	SPA; 10‡	ALG; 11	25th	4.5
2019	Cetilar Racing Villorba Corse	LMP2	Dallara P217	Gibson GK428 4.2 L V8	LEC	MNZ; Ret	CAT	SIL	SPA	ALG	36th	0
2021	Iron Lynx	LMGTE	Ferrari 488 GTE Evo	Ferrari F154CB 3.9 L Turbo V8	CAT; 5	RBR; 7	LEC; 5	MNZ; 5	SPA; 5	ALG; 8	8th	50

=== Complete GT4 European Series results ===
(key) (Races in bold indicate pole position) (Races in italics indicate fastest lap)

Year	Team	Car	Class	1	2	3	4	5	6	7	8	9	10	Pos	Points
2016	Villorba Corse	Maserati GranTurismo MC GT4	Pro	MNZ; 1; 1	MNZ; 2; 8	PAU; 1	PAU; 2	SIL; 4	SPA	HUN; 1	HUN; 2	ZAN; 1	ZAN; 2	11th	51

=== Complete FIA World Endurance Championship results ===
(key) (Races in bold indicate pole position; races in italics indicate fastest lap)

Year	Entrant	Class	Chassis	Engine	1	2	3	4	5	6	7	8	9	Rank	Points
2017	Cetilar Villorba Corse	LMP2	Dallara P217	Gibson GK428 4.2L V8	SIL	SPA	LMS; 7	NÜR	MEX	COA	FUJ	SHA	BHR	NC	0
2018–19	Cetilar Villorba Corse	LMP2	Dallara P217	Gibson GK428 4.2L V8	SPA	LMS; 11	SIL	FUJ	SHA	SEB	SPA	LMS; 13		NC	0
2019–20	Cetilar Racing	LMP2	Dallara P217	Gibson GK428 4.2L V8	SIL; 6	FUJ; 7	SHA; 7	BHR; 8	COA; 8	SPA; 5	LMS; 5	BHR; 6		12th	72
2021	Cetilar Racing	GTE Am	Ferrari 488 GTE Evo	Ferrari F154CB 3.9L Turbo V8	SPA; 3	POR; 1	MON; 10	LMS; Ret	BHR; 9	**BHR**; 4				5th	75

=== Complete 24 Hours of Le Mans results ===
Year	Team	Co-Drivers	Car	Class	Laps	Pos.	Class Pos.
2017	(Italy) Cetilar Villorba Corse	(Italy) Andrea Belicchi (Italy) Roberto Lacorte	Dallara P217	LMP2	353	9th	7th
2018	(Italy) Cetilar Villorba Corse	(Brazil) Felipe Nasr (Italy) Roberto Lacorte	Dallara P217	LMP2	342	19th	11th
2019	(Italy) Cetilar Racing Villorba Corse	(Italy) Andrea Belicchi (Italy) Roberto Lacorte	Dallara P217	LMP2	352	18th	13th
2020	(Italy) Cetilar Racing	(Italy) Andrea Belicchi (Italy) Roberto Lacorte	Dallara P217	LMP2	363	14th	11th
2021	(Italy) Cetilar Racing	(Italy) Antonio Fuoco (Italy) Roberto Lacorte	Ferrari 488 GTE Evo	GTE Am	90	DNF	DNF

=== Complete Le Mans Cup results ===
(key) (Races in bold indicate pole position; results in italics indicate fastest lap)

Year	Entrant	Class	Chassis	1	2	3	4	5	6	7	Rank	Points
2018	Kessel Racing	GT3	Ferrari 488 GT3	LEC	MNZ	LMS; 1	LMS; 2	RBR	SPA	ALG; 4	9th	12

=== Complete WeatherTech SportsCar Championship results ===
(key) (Races in bold indicate pole position)

Year	Team	Class	Chassis	Engine	1	2	3	4	5	6	7	8	9	10	11	12	Rank	Points
2021	Cetilar Racing	LMP2	Dallara P217	Gibson GK428 4.2 L V8	DAY; 6	SEB	WGL	WGL	ELK	LGA	PET						NC	0
2022	Cetilar Racing	GTD	Ferrari 488 GT3 Evo 2020	Ferrari F154CB 3.9 L Turbo V8	DAY; 14	SEB; 1	LBH	LGA	MDO	DET	WGL; 4	MOS	LIM	ELK	VIR	PET; 10	22nd	1101
2023	Cetilar Racing	GTD	Ferrari 296 GT3	Ferrari 3.0 L Turbo V6	DAY; 23	SEB; 14	LBH	LGA	WGL; 18	MOS	LIM	ELK	VIR	IMS	PET; 13		38th	637
2024	Cetilar Racing	GTD	Ferrari 296 GT3	Ferrari 3.0 L Turbo V6	DAY; 10	**SEB**; 2	LBH	LGA	WGL; 18	MOS	ELK	VIR	IMS; 7	PET; 14			29th	1183
2025	Cetilar Racing	GTD	Ferrari 296 GT3	Ferrari F163CE 3.0 L Turbo V6	DAY	SEB; 19	LBH	LGA	WGL; 7	MOS	ELK	VIR	IMS	PET			49th	411

=== Complete International GT Open results ===
Year	Team	Car	Class	1	2	3	4	5	6	7	8	9	10	11	12	13	14	Pos.	Points
2023	AF Corse	Ferrari 488 GT3 Evo 2020	Am	PRT; 1; 18	PRT; 2; 17	SPA; Ret	HUN; 1; 27	HUN; 2; 24										5th	59
2023	AF Corse	Ferrari 296 GT3	Am						LEC; 1; 10	LEC; 2; 17	RBR; 1; 20	RBR; 2; 14	MNZ; 1; 19	MNZ; 2 Ret	CAT; 1; 12	CAT; 2; 20		5th	59
2024	AF Corse	Ferrari 296 GT3	Pro-Am	ALG; 1; 15	ALG; 2; 9	HOC; 1; 13	HOC; 2; 11	SPA; 19	HUN; 1	HUN; 2	LEC; 1 Ret	LEC; 2; 27	RBR; 1 Ret	RBR; 2; 13	CAT; 1; 21	CAT; 2; 30	MNZ	10th	27
