= 2019–20 FIA World Endurance Championship =

Auto racing series

- Organizer: Fédération Internationale de l'Automobile; Automobile Club de l'Ouest
- Discipline: Sports car endurance racing
- Races: 8

Champions
- LMP1 Team: (Japan) Toyota Gazoo Racing
- GTE Manufacturer: (United Kingdom) Aston Martin
- LMP2 Team: (United Kingdom) United Autosports
- LMGTE Am Team: (Italy) AF Corse

FIA World Endurance Championship
- ← 2018–19 2021 →

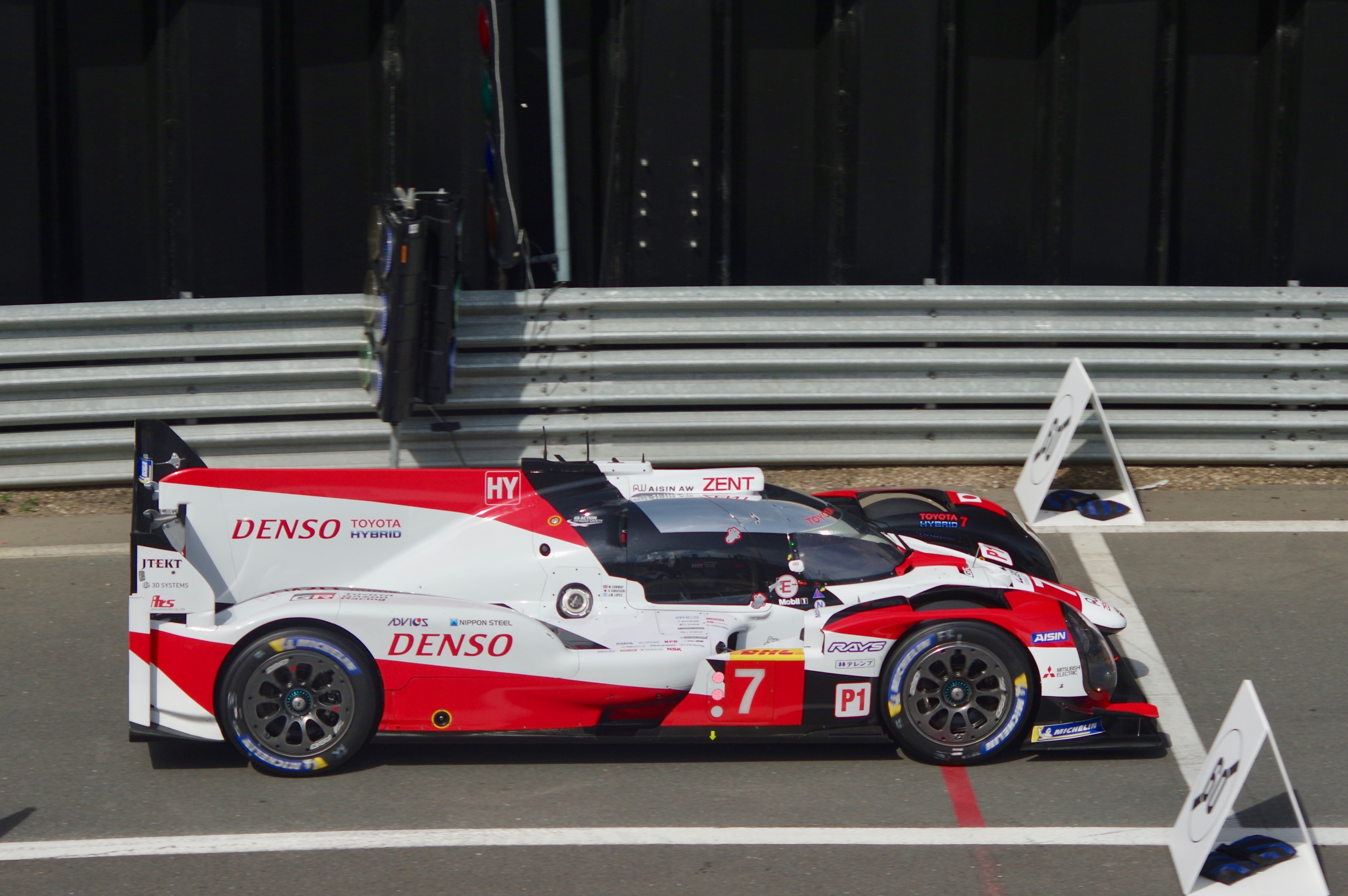
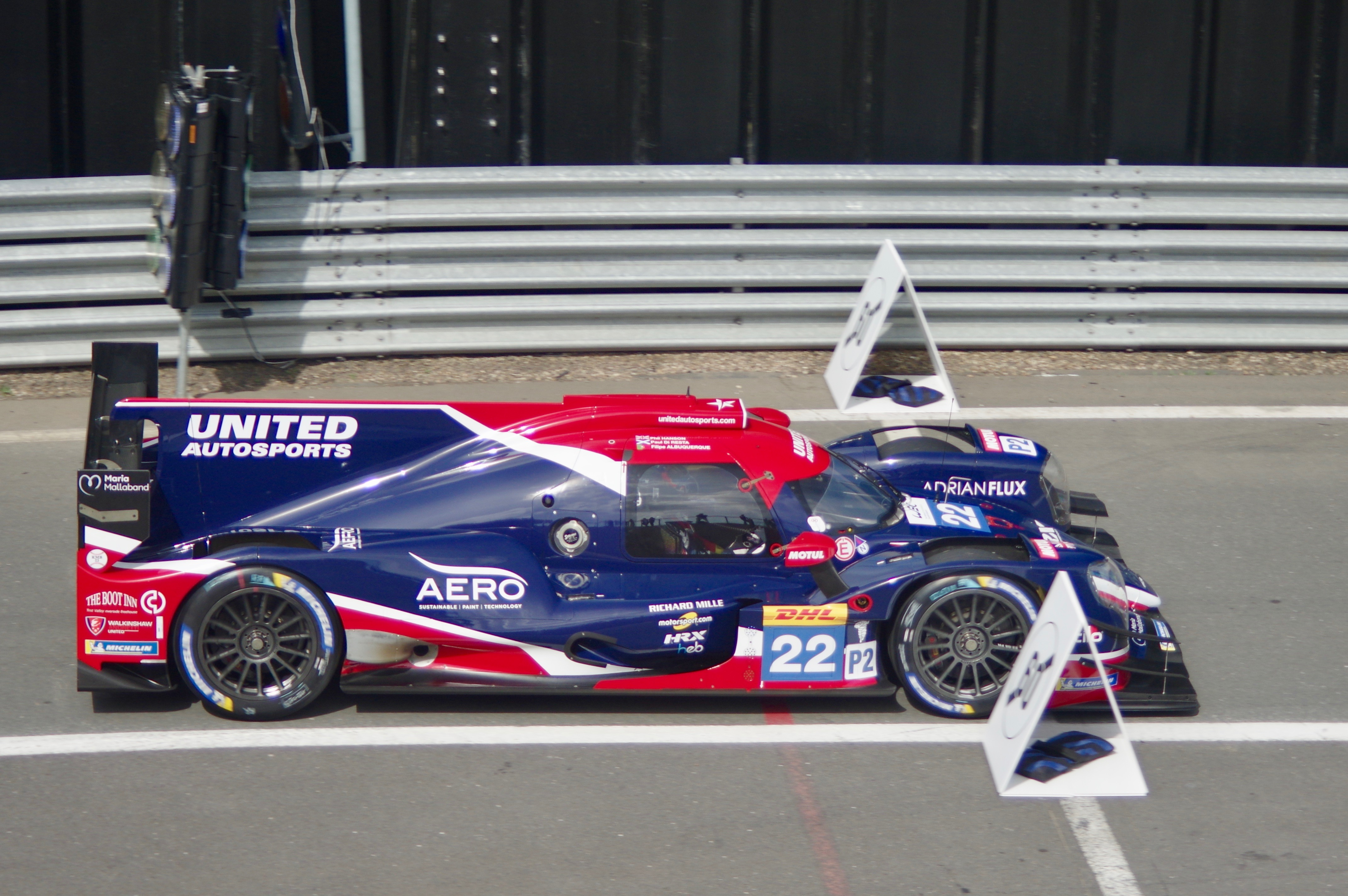
Toyota Gazoo Racing and their No. 7 car are the LMP1 team champions and the World Endurance LMP Drivers' champions, respectively. The No. 22 United Autosports won the LMP2 Teams' and Drivers' championships.

The 2019–20 FIA World Endurance Championship was the eighth season of the FIA World Endurance Championship, an auto racing series co-organised by the Fédération Internationale de l'Automobile (FIA) and the Automobile Club de l'Ouest (ACO). The series is open to Le Mans Prototypes and grand tourer-style racing cars divided into four categories. World Championship titles were awarded for LMP drivers, LMP1 teams, GTE drivers and GTE manufacturers. With the new winter scheduling format, the series began at Silverstone Circuit in September 2019 and ended with the 2020 8 Hours of Bahrain in November 2020.

This would be the final season in the FIA WEC for the LMP1 Class as it would be replaced with Le Mans Hypercar protoypes as the top tier class the next years season.

== Schedule ==
The FIA and ACO announced a provisional schedule during the 2018 6 Hours of Silverstone which feature eight events over ten months. All events from the previous season were carried over, as well as the return of Bahrain which was not on the 2018–2019 calendar, and Interlagos which last held a WEC event in 2014. However, the length of the majority of events was altered, moving away from the traditional six-hour format used in previous seasons. Bahrain in an eight-hour race and Silverstone and Shanghai were shortened to four-hour events.

After Formula 1 announced their provisional 2019 schedule, the WEC moved the Fuji round forward one week to 6 October to avoid a conflict with the Japanese Grand Prix. This also avoided a date conflict with the scheduled date for the IMSA season finale, Petit Le Mans. Moving the Fuji round forward also allowed the Shanghai round to be moved forward one week to 10 November, which avoided a conflict with the traditional date for the Macau Grand Prix. On 2 December 2019, it was announced that due to the failure of the promoter for 6 Hours of São Paulo to fulfill its contractual obligations to the championship, the round would be canceled, and instead replaced by the 6 Hours of Circuit of the Americas. The FIA also moved the date back three weeks to avoid a clashing with Super Bowl LIV and the Mexico City ePrix.

The 1000 Miles of Sebring was scheduled for 20 March 2020, but was cancelled due to a travel ban to the U.S. from mainland Europe in response to the COVID-19 pandemic. The 24 Hours of Le Mans was postponed to September due to the coronavirus. The 6 Hours of Spa-Francorchamps was postponed on 16 March. On 3 April 2020, a new revised calendar for the 2019–20 season was released, with the Spa race moved to 15 August and another 8 Hours of Bahrain event, on 21 November 2020, replacing the cancelled 1000 Miles of Sebring. The final round at Bahrain in November was moved up a week as a result of Formula One scheduling a double header event at that venue for the end of the month.

Round	Race	Circuit	Location	Date
	Prologue	Circuit de Barcelona-Catalunya	(Spain) Montmeló	23/24 July 2019
1	4 Hours of Silverstone	Silverstone Circuit	(United Kingdom) Silverstone	1 September 2019
2	6 Hours of Fuji	Fuji Speedway	(Japan) Oyama, Shizuoka	6 October 2019
3	4 Hours of Shanghai	Shanghai International Circuit	(China) Shanghai	10 November 2019
4	8 Hours of Bahrain (2019)	Bahrain International Circuit	(Bahrain) Sakhir	14 December 2019
5	Lone Star Le Mans	Circuit of the Americas	(United States) Austin, Texas	23 February 2020
6	6 Hours of Spa-Francorchamps	Circuit de Spa-Francorchamps	(Belgium) Stavelot	15 August 2020
7	24 Hours of Le Mans	Circuit de la Sarthe	(France) Le Mans	19–20 September 2020
8	8 Hours of Bahrain (2020)	Bahrain International Circuit	(Bahrain) Sakhir	14 November 2020
Cancelled Races
Race		Circuit	Location	Original Date
6 Hours of São Paulo		Interlagos Circuit	(Brazil) São Paulo	1 February 2020
1000 Miles of Sebring		Sebring International Raceway	(United States) Sebring, Florida	20 March 2020

== Teams and drivers ==
=== LMP1 ===
Entrant	Car	Engine	Hybrid	Tyre	No.	Drivers	Rounds
(Switzerland) Rebellion Racing	Rebellion R13	Gibson GL458 4.5 L V8		M	1	(United States) Gustavo Menezes	1–7
(Switzerland) Rebellion Racing	Rebellion R13	Gibson GL458 4.5 L V8		M	1	(France) Norman Nato	1–7
(Switzerland) Rebellion Racing	Rebellion R13	Gibson GL458 4.5 L V8		M	1	(Brazil) Bruno Senna	1–7
(Switzerland) Rebellion Racing	Rebellion R13	Gibson GL458 4.5 L V8		M	3*	(France) Nathanaël Berthon	1, 7
(Switzerland) Rebellion Racing	Rebellion R13	Gibson GL458 4.5 L V8		M	3*	(Brazil) Pipo Derani	1
(Switzerland) Rebellion Racing	Rebellion R13	Gibson GL458 4.5 L V8		M	3*	(France) Loïc Duval	1
(Switzerland) Rebellion Racing	Rebellion R13	Gibson GL458 4.5 L V8		M	3*	(Switzerland) Louis Delétraz	7
(Switzerland) Rebellion Racing	Rebellion R13	Gibson GL458 4.5 L V8		M	3*	(France) Romain Dumas	7
(Austria) ByKolles Racing Team	ENSO CLM P1/01	Gibson GL458 4.5 L V8		M	4*	(France) Tom Dillmann	6–7
(Austria) ByKolles Racing Team	ENSO CLM P1/01	Gibson GL458 4.5 L V8		M	4*	(Canada) Bruno Spengler	6–7
(Austria) ByKolles Racing Team	ENSO CLM P1/01	Gibson GL458 4.5 L V8		M	4*	(United Kingdom) Oliver Webb	6–7
(United Kingdom) Team LNT	Ginetta G60-LT-P1	AER P60C 2.4 L Turbo V6		M	5	(United Kingdom) Ben Hanley	1–4
(United Kingdom) Team LNT	Ginetta G60-LT-P1	AER P60C 2.4 L Turbo V6		M	5	(Russia) Egor Orudzhev	1–3
(United Kingdom) Team LNT	Ginetta G60-LT-P1	AER P60C 2.4 L Turbo V6		M	5	(United Kingdom) Charlie Robertson	1, 4
(United Kingdom) Team LNT	Ginetta G60-LT-P1	AER P60C 2.4 L Turbo V6		M	5	(Italy) Luca Ghiotto	2
(United Kingdom) Team LNT	Ginetta G60-LT-P1	AER P60C 2.4 L Turbo V6		M	5	(United Kingdom) Jordan King	3–4
(United Kingdom) Team LNT	Ginetta G60-LT-P1	AER P60C 2.4 L Turbo V6		M	6	(United Kingdom) Oliver Jarvis	1
(United Kingdom) Team LNT	Ginetta G60-LT-P1	AER P60C 2.4 L Turbo V6		M	6	(United Kingdom) Mike Simpson	1–4
(United Kingdom) Team LNT	Ginetta G60-LT-P1	AER P60C 2.4 L Turbo V6		M	6	(United Kingdom) Guy Smith	1–4
(United Kingdom) Team LNT	Ginetta G60-LT-P1	AER P60C 2.4 L Turbo V6		M	6	(United Kingdom) Charlie Robertson	2–3
(United Kingdom) Team LNT	Ginetta G60-LT-P1	AER P60C 2.4 L Turbo V6		M	6	(United States) Chris Dyson	4
(Japan) Toyota Gazoo Racing	Toyota TS050 Hybrid	Toyota H8909 2.4 L Turbo V6	Hybrid	M	7	(United Kingdom) Mike Conway	All
(Japan) Toyota Gazoo Racing	Toyota TS050 Hybrid	Toyota H8909 2.4 L Turbo V6	Hybrid	M	7	(Japan) Kamui Kobayashi	All
(Japan) Toyota Gazoo Racing	Toyota TS050 Hybrid	Toyota H8909 2.4 L Turbo V6	Hybrid	M	7	(Argentina) José María López	All
(Japan) Toyota Gazoo Racing	Toyota TS050 Hybrid	Toyota H8909 2.4 L Turbo V6	Hybrid	M	8	(Switzerland) Sébastien Buemi	All
(Japan) Toyota Gazoo Racing	Toyota TS050 Hybrid	Toyota H8909 2.4 L Turbo V6	Hybrid	M	8	(New Zealand) Brendon Hartley	All
(Japan) Toyota Gazoo Racing	Toyota TS050 Hybrid	Toyota H8909 2.4 L Turbo V6	Hybrid	M	8	(Japan) Kazuki Nakajima	All

Note* The #3 Rebellion R13 entry only appeared at the first and seventh rounds of the season; it was not classified as a full season entry, and was ineligible for points in the World Endurance LMP Drivers & World Endurance LMP1 Championship standings.

Note* The #4 ByKolles ENSO CLM P1/01 entry only appeared at the sixth and seventh rounds of the season; it was not classified as a full season entry, and was ineligible for points in the World Endurance LMP Drivers & World Endurance LMP1 Championship standings.

=== LMP2 ===
In accordance with the Le Mans Prototype LMP2 regulations all cars used the Gibson GK428 4.2 L V8 engine.

Entrant	Car	Tyre	No.	Drivers	Rounds
(United Kingdom) United Autosports	Oreca 07	M	22	(Portugal) Filipe Albuquerque	All
(United Kingdom) United Autosports	Oreca 07	M	22	(United Kingdom) Phil Hanson	All
(United Kingdom) United Autosports	Oreca 07	M	22	(United Kingdom) Paul di Resta	1, 3–8
(United Kingdom) United Autosports	Oreca 07	M	22	(United Kingdom) Oliver Jarvis	2
(Netherlands) Racing Team Nederland	Oreca 07	M	29	(Netherlands) Giedo van der Garde	All
(Netherlands) Racing Team Nederland	Oreca 07	M	29	(Netherlands) Frits van Eerd	All
(Netherlands) Racing Team Nederland	Oreca 07	M	29	(Netherlands) Job van Uitert	1, 6
(Netherlands) Racing Team Nederland	Oreca 07	M	29	(Netherlands) Nyck de Vries	2–5, 7–8
(Denmark) High Class Racing	Oreca 07	G M	33	(Denmark) Anders Fjordbach	1–7
(Denmark) High Class Racing	Oreca 07	G M	33	(United States) Mark Patterson	1–7
(Denmark) High Class Racing	Oreca 07	G M	33	(Japan) Kenta Yamashita	1–7
(France) Signatech Alpine Elf	Alpine A470	M	36	(France) Thomas Laurent	All
(France) Signatech Alpine Elf	Alpine A470	M	36	(Brazil) André Negrão	All
(France) Signatech Alpine Elf	Alpine A470	M	36	(France) Pierre Ragues	All
(China) Jackie Chan DC Racing	Oreca 07	G	37	(United Kingdom) Will Stevens	All
(China) Jackie Chan DC Racing	Oreca 07	G	37	(China) Ho-Pin Tung	All
(China) Jackie Chan DC Racing	Oreca 07	G	37	(France) Gabriel Aubry	1–5, 7–8
(China) Jackie Chan DC Racing	Oreca 07	G	37	(Republic of Ireland) Ryan Cullen	6
(United Kingdom) Jota Sport	Oreca 07	G	38	(Portugal) António Félix da Costa	All
(United Kingdom) Jota Sport	Oreca 07	G	38	(Mexico) Roberto González	All
(United Kingdom) Jota Sport	Oreca 07	G	38	(United Kingdom) Anthony Davidson	2–8
(Switzerland) Cool Racing	Oreca 07	M	42	(Switzerland) Antonin Borga	1–7
(Switzerland) Cool Racing	Oreca 07	M	42	(France) Nicolas Lapierre	1–7
(Switzerland) Cool Racing	Oreca 07	M	42	(Switzerland) Alexandre Coigny	1–7
(Italy) Cetilar Racing	Dallara P217	M	47	(Italy) Andrea Belicchi	All
(Italy) Cetilar Racing	Dallara P217	M	47	(Italy) Roberto Lacorte	All
(Italy) Cetilar Racing	Dallara P217	M	47	(Italy) Giorgio Sernagiotto	All

- Pastor Maldonado was scheduled to compete for Jota Sport, but was replaced by António Félix da Costa.

=== LMGTE Pro ===
Entrant	Car	Engine	Tyre	No.	Drivers	Rounds
(Italy) AF Corse	Ferrari 488 GTE Evo	Ferrari F154CB 4.0 L Turbo V8	M	51	(United Kingdom) James Calado	All
(Italy) AF Corse	Ferrari 488 GTE Evo	Ferrari F154CB 4.0 L Turbo V8	M	51	(Italy) Alessandro Pier Guidi	1–7
(Italy) AF Corse	Ferrari 488 GTE Evo	Ferrari F154CB 4.0 L Turbo V8	M	51	(Brazil) Daniel Serra	7–8
(Italy) AF Corse	Ferrari 488 GTE Evo	Ferrari F154CB 4.0 L Turbo V8	M	71	(Spain) Miguel Molina	All
(Italy) AF Corse	Ferrari 488 GTE Evo	Ferrari F154CB 4.0 L Turbo V8	M	71	(Italy) Davide Rigon	All
(Italy) AF Corse	Ferrari 488 GTE Evo	Ferrari F154CB 4.0 L Turbo V8	M	71	(United Kingdom) Sam Bird	7
(Germany) Porsche GT Team	Porsche 911 RSR-19	Porsche M97/80 4.2 L Flat-6	M	91	(Italy) Gianmaria Bruni	All
(Germany) Porsche GT Team	Porsche 911 RSR-19	Porsche M97/80 4.2 L Flat-6	M	91	(Austria) Richard Lietz	All
(Germany) Porsche GT Team	Porsche 911 RSR-19	Porsche M97/80 4.2 L Flat-6	M	91	(France) Frédéric Makowiecki	7
(Germany) Porsche GT Team	Porsche 911 RSR-19	Porsche M97/80 4.2 L Flat-6	M	92	(Denmark) Michael Christensen	All
(Germany) Porsche GT Team	Porsche 911 RSR-19	Porsche M97/80 4.2 L Flat-6	M	92	(France) Kévin Estre	All
(Germany) Porsche GT Team	Porsche 911 RSR-19	Porsche M97/80 4.2 L Flat-6	M	92	(Belgium) Laurens Vanthoor	7
(United Kingdom) Aston Martin Racing	Aston Martin Vantage AMR	Aston Martin M177 4.0 L Turbo V8	M	95	(Denmark) Marco Sørensen	All
(United Kingdom) Aston Martin Racing	Aston Martin Vantage AMR	Aston Martin M177 4.0 L Turbo V8	M	95	(Denmark) Nicki Thiim	All
(United Kingdom) Aston Martin Racing	Aston Martin Vantage AMR	Aston Martin M177 4.0 L Turbo V8	M	95	(United Kingdom) Richard Westbrook	7
(United Kingdom) Aston Martin Racing	Aston Martin Vantage AMR	Aston Martin M177 4.0 L Turbo V8	M	97	(Belgium) Maxime Martin	All
(United Kingdom) Aston Martin Racing	Aston Martin Vantage AMR	Aston Martin M177 4.0 L Turbo V8	M	97	(United Kingdom) Alex Lynn	1–7
(United Kingdom) Aston Martin Racing	Aston Martin Vantage AMR	Aston Martin M177 4.0 L Turbo V8	M	97	(United Kingdom) Harry Tincknell	7
(United Kingdom) Aston Martin Racing	Aston Martin Vantage AMR	Aston Martin M177 4.0 L Turbo V8	M	97	(United Kingdom) Richard Westbrook	8

=== LMGTE Am ===
Entrant	Car	Engine	Tyre	No.	Drivers	Rounds
(Italy) AF Corse	Ferrari 488 GTE Evo	Ferrari F154CB 4.0 L Turbo V8	M	54	(Italy) Francesco Castellacci	All
(Italy) AF Corse	Ferrari 488 GTE Evo	Ferrari F154CB 4.0 L Turbo V8	M	54	(Italy) Giancarlo Fisichella	All
(Italy) AF Corse	Ferrari 488 GTE Evo	Ferrari F154CB 4.0 L Turbo V8	M	54	(Switzerland) Thomas Flohr	All
(Italy) AF Corse	Ferrari 488 GTE Evo	Ferrari F154CB 4.0 L Turbo V8	M	83	(France) Emmanuel Collard	All
(Italy) AF Corse	Ferrari 488 GTE Evo	Ferrari F154CB 4.0 L Turbo V8	M	83	(Denmark) Nicklas Nielsen	All
(Italy) AF Corse	Ferrari 488 GTE Evo	Ferrari F154CB 4.0 L Turbo V8	M	83	(France) François Perrodo	All
(Germany) Team Project 1	Porsche 911 RSR	Porsche M97/80 4.0 L Flat-6	M	56	(Norway) Egidio Perfetti	All
(Germany) Team Project 1	Porsche 911 RSR	Porsche M97/80 4.0 L Flat-6	M	56	(Italy) Matteo Cairoli	1–7
(Germany) Team Project 1	Porsche 911 RSR	Porsche M97/80 4.0 L Flat-6	M	56	(Germany) David Kolkmann	1
(Germany) Team Project 1	Porsche 911 RSR	Porsche M97/80 4.0 L Flat-6	M	56	(Denmark) David Heinemeier Hansson	2–4
(Germany) Team Project 1	Porsche 911 RSR	Porsche M97/80 4.0 L Flat-6	M	56	(Germany) Laurents Hörr	5–6
(Germany) Team Project 1	Porsche 911 RSR	Porsche M97/80 4.0 L Flat-6	M	56	(Netherlands) Larry ten Voorde	7–8
(Germany) Team Project 1	Porsche 911 RSR	Porsche M97/80 4.0 L Flat-6	M	56	(Germany) Jörg Bergmeister	8
(Germany) Team Project 1	Porsche 911 RSR	Porsche M97/80 4.0 L Flat-6	M	57	(Netherlands) Jeroen Bleekemolen	All
(Germany) Team Project 1	Porsche 911 RSR	Porsche M97/80 4.0 L Flat-6	M	57	(United States) Ben Keating	All
(Germany) Team Project 1	Porsche 911 RSR	Porsche M97/80 4.0 L Flat-6	M	57	(Brazil) Felipe Fraga	1–2, 5–7
(Germany) Team Project 1	Porsche 911 RSR	Porsche M97/80 4.0 L Flat-6	M	57	(Netherlands) Larry ten Voorde	3–4
(Germany) Team Project 1	Porsche 911 RSR	Porsche M97/80 4.0 L Flat-6	M	57	(Luxembourg) Dylan Pereira	8
(United Kingdom) Red River Sport	Ferrari 488 GTE Evo	Ferrari F154CB 4.0 L Turbo V8	M	62	(United Kingdom) Bonamy Grimes	All
(United Kingdom) Red River Sport	Ferrari 488 GTE Evo	Ferrari F154CB 4.0 L Turbo V8	M	62	(United Kingdom) Charles Hollings	1–7
(United Kingdom) Red River Sport	Ferrari 488 GTE Evo	Ferrari F154CB 4.0 L Turbo V8	M	62	(United Kingdom) Johnny Mowlem	1–7
(United Kingdom) Red River Sport	Ferrari 488 GTE Evo	Ferrari F154CB 4.0 L Turbo V8	M	62	(Japan) Kei Cozzolino	8
(United Kingdom) Red River Sport	Ferrari 488 GTE Evo	Ferrari F154CB 4.0 L Turbo V8	M	62	(United Kingdom) Colin Noble	8
(Japan) MR Racing	Ferrari 488 GTE Evo	Ferrari F154CB 4.0 L Turbo V8	M	70	(Japan) Kei Cozzolino	1–5, 7
(Japan) MR Racing	Ferrari 488 GTE Evo	Ferrari F154CB 4.0 L Turbo V8	M	70	(Monaco) Olivier Beretta	1–5
(Japan) MR Racing	Ferrari 488 GTE Evo	Ferrari F154CB 4.0 L Turbo V8	M	70	(Japan) Motoaki Ishikawa	1–5
(Japan) MR Racing	Ferrari 488 GTE Evo	Ferrari F154CB 4.0 L Turbo V8	M	70	(Monaco) Vincent Abril	7
(Japan) MR Racing	Ferrari 488 GTE Evo	Ferrari F154CB 4.0 L Turbo V8	M	70	(Japan) Takeshi Kimura	7
(Germany) Dempsey-Proton Racing	Porsche 911 RSR	Porsche M97/80 4.0 L Flat-6	M	77	(Italy) Riccardo Pera	All
(Germany) Dempsey-Proton Racing	Porsche 911 RSR	Porsche M97/80 4.0 L Flat-6	M	77	(Germany) Christian Ried	All
(Germany) Dempsey-Proton Racing	Porsche 911 RSR	Porsche M97/80 4.0 L Flat-6	M	77	(Australia) Matt Campbell	1–7
(Germany) Dempsey-Proton Racing	Porsche 911 RSR	Porsche M97/80 4.0 L Flat-6	M	77	(Norway) Dennis Olsen	8
(Germany) Dempsey-Proton Racing	Porsche 911 RSR	Porsche M97/80 4.0 L Flat-6	M	88	(Austria) Thomas Preining	1–5, 7
(Germany) Dempsey-Proton Racing	Porsche 911 RSR	Porsche M97/80 4.0 L Flat-6	M	88	(Italy) Gianluca Giraudi	1, 6
(Germany) Dempsey-Proton Racing	Porsche 911 RSR	Porsche M97/80 4.0 L Flat-6	M	88	(Mexico) Ricardo Sánchez	1, 6
(Germany) Dempsey-Proton Racing	Porsche 911 RSR	Porsche M97/80 4.0 L Flat-6	M	88	(Japan) Satoshi Hoshino	2
(Germany) Dempsey-Proton Racing	Porsche 911 RSR	Porsche M97/80 4.0 L Flat-6	M	88	(Belgium) Adrien de Leener	2, 4–5, 7
(Germany) Dempsey-Proton Racing	Porsche 911 RSR	Porsche M97/80 4.0 L Flat-6	M	88	(New Zealand) Will Bamber	3
(Germany) Dempsey-Proton Racing	Porsche 911 RSR	Porsche M97/80 4.0 L Flat-6	M	88	(Italy) Angelo Negro	3
(Germany) Dempsey-Proton Racing	Porsche 911 RSR	Porsche M97/80 4.0 L Flat-6	M	88	(United Arab Emirates) Khaled Al Qubaisi	4, 8
(Germany) Dempsey-Proton Racing	Porsche 911 RSR	Porsche M97/80 4.0 L Flat-6	M	88	(United States) Bret Curtis	5
(Germany) Dempsey-Proton Racing	Porsche 911 RSR	Porsche M97/80 4.0 L Flat-6	M	88	(Switzerland) Lucas Légeret	6
(Germany) Dempsey-Proton Racing	Porsche 911 RSR	Porsche M97/80 4.0 L Flat-6	M	88	(United States) Dominique Bastien	7
(Germany) Dempsey-Proton Racing	Porsche 911 RSR	Porsche M97/80 4.0 L Flat-6	M	88	(Germany) Marco Holzer	8
(Germany) Dempsey-Proton Racing	Porsche 911 RSR	Porsche M97/80 4.0 L Flat-6	M	88	(New Zealand) Jaxon Evans	8
(United Kingdom) Gulf Racing	Porsche 911 RSR	Porsche M97/80 4.0 L Flat-6	M	86	(United Kingdom) Ben Barker	All
(United Kingdom) Gulf Racing	Porsche 911 RSR	Porsche M97/80 4.0 L Flat-6	M	86	(United Kingdom) Michael Wainwright	All
(United Kingdom) Gulf Racing	Porsche 911 RSR	Porsche M97/80 4.0 L Flat-6	M	86	(United Kingdom) Andrew Watson	1–7
(United Kingdom) Gulf Racing	Porsche 911 RSR	Porsche M97/80 4.0 L Flat-6	M	86	(Belgium) Alessio Picariello	8
(United Kingdom) TF Sport	Aston Martin Vantage AMR	Aston Martin M177 4.0 L Turbo V8	M	90	(United Kingdom) Jonathan Adam	All
(United Kingdom) TF Sport	Aston Martin Vantage AMR	Aston Martin M177 4.0 L Turbo V8	M	90	(Republic of Ireland) Charlie Eastwood	All
(United Kingdom) TF Sport	Aston Martin Vantage AMR	Aston Martin M177 4.0 L Turbo V8	M	90	(Turkey) Salih Yoluç	All
(United Kingdom) Aston Martin Racing	Aston Martin Vantage AMR	Aston Martin M177 4.0 L Turbo V8	M	98	(Canada) Paul Dalla Lana	All
(United Kingdom) Aston Martin Racing	Aston Martin Vantage AMR	Aston Martin M177 4.0 L Turbo V8	M	98	(United Kingdom) Ross Gunn	All
(United Kingdom) Aston Martin Racing	Aston Martin Vantage AMR	Aston Martin M177 4.0 L Turbo V8	M	98	(United Kingdom) Darren Turner	1–5
(United Kingdom) Aston Martin Racing	Aston Martin Vantage AMR	Aston Martin M177 4.0 L Turbo V8	M	98	(Brazil) Augusto Farfus	6–7
(United Kingdom) Aston Martin Racing	Aston Martin Vantage AMR	Aston Martin M177 4.0 L Turbo V8	M	98	(Portugal) Pedro Lamy	8

== Results and standings ==
=== Race results ===
The highest finishing competitor entered in the World Endurance Championship is listed below. Invitational entries may have finished ahead of WEC competitors in individual races.

Rnd.	Circuit	LMP1 Winners	LMP2 Winners	LMGTE Pro Winners	LMGTE Am Winners	Report
1	Silverstone	(Japan) No. 7 Toyota Gazoo Racing	(Switzerland) No. 42 Cool Racing	(Germany) No. 91 Porsche GT Team	(Italy) No. 83 AF Corse	Report
1	Silverstone	(United Kingdom) Mike Conway (Japan) Kamui Kobayashi (Argentina) José María López	(Switzerland) Antonin Borga (France) Nicolas Lapierre	(Italy) Gianmaria Bruni (Austria) Richard Lietz	(France) Emmanuel Collard (Denmark) Nicklas Nielsen (France) François Perrodo	Report
2	Fuji	(Japan) No. 8 Toyota Gazoo Racing	(Netherlands) No. 29 Racing Team Nederland	(United Kingdom) No. 95 Aston Martin Racing	(United Kingdom) No. 90 TF Sport	Report
2	Fuji	(Switzerland) Sébastien Buemi (New Zealand) Brendon Hartley (Japan) Kazuki Nakajima	(Netherlands) Nyck de Vries (Netherlands) Giedo van der Garde (Netherlands) Frits van Eerd	(Denmark) Marco Sørensen (Denmark) Nicki Thiim	(United Kingdom) Jonathan Adam (Republic of Ireland) Charlie Eastwood (Turkey) Salih Yoluç	Report
3	Shanghai	(Switzerland) No. 1 Rebellion Racing	(United Kingdom) No. 38 Jota Sport	(Italy) No. 51 AF Corse	(United Kingdom) No. 90 TF Sport	Report
3	Shanghai	(United States) Gustavo Menezes (France) Norman Nato (Brazil) Bruno Senna	(Portugal) António Félix da Costa (United Kingdom) Anthony Davidson (Mexico) Roberto González	(United Kingdom) James Calado (Italy) Alessandro Pier Guidi	(United Kingdom) Jonathan Adam (Republic of Ireland) Charlie Eastwood (Turkey) Salih Yoluç	Report
4	Bahrain	(Japan) No. 7 Toyota Gazoo Racing	(United Kingdom) No. 22 United Autosports	(United Kingdom) No. 95 Aston Martin Racing	(Germany) No. 57 Team Project 1	Report
4	Bahrain	(United Kingdom) Mike Conway (Japan) Kamui Kobayashi (Argentina) José María López	(Portugal) Filipe Albuquerque (United Kingdom) Phil Hanson (United Kingdom) Paul di Resta	(Denmark) Marco Sørensen (Denmark) Nicki Thiim	(Netherlands) Jeroen Bleekemolen (United States) Ben Keating (Netherlands) Larry ten Voorde	Report
5	Austin	(Switzerland) No. 1 Rebellion Racing	(United Kingdom) No. 22 United Autosports	(United Kingdom) No. 95 Aston Martin Racing	(United Kingdom) No. 90 TF Sport	Report
5	Austin	(United States) Gustavo Menezes (France) Norman Nato (Brazil) Bruno Senna	(Portugal) Filipe Albuquerque (United Kingdom) Phil Hanson (United Kingdom) Paul di Resta	(Denmark) Marco Sørensen (Denmark) Nicki Thiim	(United Kingdom) Jonathan Adam (Republic of Ireland) Charlie Eastwood (Turkey) Salih Yoluç	Report
6	Spa-Francorchamps	(Japan) No. 7 Toyota Gazoo Racing	(United Kingdom) No. 22 United Autosports	(Germany) No. 92 Porsche GT Team	(Italy) No. 83 AF Corse	Report
6	Spa-Francorchamps	(United Kingdom) Mike Conway (Japan) Kamui Kobayashi (Argentina) José María López	(Portugal) Filipe Albuquerque (United Kingdom) Phil Hanson (United Kingdom) Paul di Resta	(Denmark) Michael Christensen (France) Kévin Estre	(France) Emmanuel Collard (Denmark) Nicklas Nielsen (France) François Perrodo	Report
7	Le Mans	(Japan) No. 8 Toyota Gazoo Racing	(United Kingdom) No. 22 United Autosports	(United Kingdom) No. 97 Aston Martin Racing	(United Kingdom) No. 90 TF Sport	Report
7	Le Mans	(Switzerland) Sébastien Buemi (New Zealand) Brendon Hartley (Japan) Kazuki Nakajima	(Portugal) Filipe Albuquerque (United Kingdom) Phil Hanson (United Kingdom) Paul di Resta	(United Kingdom) Alex Lynn (Belgium) Maxime Martin (United Kingdom) Harry Tincknell	(United Kingdom) Jonathan Adam (Republic of Ireland) Charlie Eastwood (Turkey) Salih Yoluç	Report
8	Bahrain	(Japan) No. 7 Toyota Gazoo Racing	(China) No. 37 Jackie Chan DC Racing	(Germany) No. 92 Porsche GT Team	(Germany) No. 56 Team Project 1	Report
8	Bahrain	(United Kingdom) Mike Conway (Japan) Kamui Kobayashi (Argentina) José María López	(France) Gabriel Aubry (United Kingdom) Will Stevens (China) Ho-Pin Tung	(Denmark) Michael Christensen (France) Kévin Estre	(Germany) Jörg Bergmeister (Norway) Egidio Perfetti (Netherlands) Larry ten Voorde	Report

=== Drivers' championships ===
Four titles were offered to drivers, two with world championship status. The LMP World Endurance Drivers' Championship was reserved for LMP1 and LMP2 drivers while the GTE World Endurance Drivers' Championship was available for drivers in the LMGTE categories. FIA Endurance Trophies were awarded in LMP2 and in LMGTE Am.

Entries were required to complete the timed race as well as to complete 70% of the overall winning car's race distance in order to earn championship points. A single bonus point was awarded to the team and all drivers of the pole position car for each category in qualifying. Furthermore, a race must complete two laps under green flag conditions in order for championship points to be awarded.

Points systems
Duration	1st	2nd	3rd	4th	5th	6th	7th	8th	9th	10th	Other	Pole
4–6 Hours	25	18	15	12	10	8	6	4	2	1	0.5	1
8 Hours	38	27	23	18	15	12	9	6	3	2	1	1
24 Hours	50	36	30	24	20	16	12	8	4	2	1	1

==== World Endurance LMP Drivers' Championship ====
Pos.	Driver	Team	SIL (United Kingdom)	FUJ (Japan)	SHA (China)	BHR (Bahrain)	COA (United States)	SPA (Belgium)	LMS (France)	BHR (Bahrain)	Points
1	(United Kingdom) Mike Conway	(Japan) Toyota Gazoo Racing	**1**	2	3	1	3	1	**3**	**1**	207
1	(Japan) Kamui Kobayashi	(Japan) Toyota Gazoo Racing	**1**	2	3	1	3	1	**3**	**1**	207
1	(Argentina) José María López	(Japan) Toyota Gazoo Racing	**1**	2	3	1	3	1	**3**	**1**	207
2	(Switzerland) Sébastien Buemi	(Japan) Toyota Gazoo Racing	2	**1**	2	2	2	2	1	2	202
2	(New Zealand) Brendon Hartley	(Japan) Toyota Gazoo Racing	2	**1**	2	2	2	2	1	2	202
2	(Japan) Kazuki Nakajima	(Japan) Toyota Gazoo Racing	2	**1**	2	2	2	2	1	2	202
3	(United States) Gustavo Menezes	(Switzerland) Rebellion Racing	9	3	**1**	**3**	**1**	**3**	2		145
3	(France) Norman Nato	(Switzerland) Rebellion Racing	9	3	**1**	**3**	**1**	**3**	2		145
3	(Brazil) Bruno Senna	(Switzerland) Rebellion Racing	9	3	**1**	**3**	**1**	**3**	2		145
4	(Portugal) Filipe Albuquerque	(United Kingdom) United Autosports	Ret	6	8	4	4	4	4	6	90
4	(United Kingdom) Phil Hanson	(United Kingdom) United Autosports	Ret	6	8	4	4	4	4	6	90
5	(United Kingdom) Paul di Resta	(United Kingdom) United Autosports	Ret		8	4	4	4	4	6	82
6	(Portugal) António Félix da Costa	(United Kingdom) Jota Sport	8	DSQ	6	5	6	7	5	4	79
6	(Mexico) Roberto González	(United Kingdom) Jota Sport	8	DSQ	6	5	6	7	5	4	79
7	(United Kingdom) Anthony Davidson	(United Kingdom) Jota Sport		DSQ	6	5	6	7	5	4	75
8	(United Kingdom) Will Stevens	(China) Jackie Chan DC Racing	7	5	7	6	5	9	DSQ	3	69
8	(China) Ho-Pin Tung	(China) Jackie Chan DC Racing	7	5	7	6	5	9	DSQ	3	69
9	(France) Gabriel Aubry	(China) Jackie Chan DC Racing	7	5	7	6	5	WD	DSQ	3	67
10	(Netherlands) Giedo van der Garde	(Netherlands) Racing Team Nederland	6	4	10	8	8	6	9	5	58
10	(Netherlands) Frits van Eerd	(Netherlands) Racing Team Nederland	6	4	10	8	8	6	9	5	58
11	(France) Thomas Laurent	(France) Signatech Alpine Elf	5	10	9	7	9	Ret	6	7	49
11	(Brazil) André Negrão	(France) Signatech Alpine Elf	5	10	9	7	9	Ret	6	7	49
11	(France) Pierre Ragues	(France) Signatech Alpine Elf	5	10	9	7	9	Ret	6	7	49
12	(Switzerland) Antonin Borga	(Switzerland) Cool Racing	4	8	Ret	9	7	5	7		47
12	(France) Nicolas Lapierre	(Switzerland) Cool Racing	4	8	Ret	9	7	5	7		47
13	(Netherlands) Nyck de Vries	(Netherlands) Racing Team Nederland		4	10	8	8		9	5	42
14	(Switzerland) Alexandre Coigny	(Switzerland) Cool Racing	WD	8	Ret	9	7	5	7		35
15	(United Kingdom) Ben Hanley	(United Kingdom) Team LNT	3	11	4	Ret					27.5
15	(Russia) Egor Orudzhev	(United Kingdom) Team LNT	3	11	4						27.5
16	(United Kingdom) Charlie Robertson	(United Kingdom) Team LNT	3	9	5	Ret					27
17	(Italy) Andrea Belicchi	(Italy) Cetilar Racing	10	12	12	11	11	8	8	8	21.5
17	(Italy) Roberto Lacorte	(Italy) Cetilar Racing	10	12	12	11	11	8	8	8	21.5
17	(Italy) Giorgio Sernagiotto	(Italy) Cetilar Racing	10	12	12	11	11	8	8	8	21.5
18	(Netherlands) Job van Uitert	(Netherlands) Racing Team Nederland	6					6			16
19	(United Kingdom) Mike Simpson	(United Kingdom) Team LNT	12	9	5	Ret					12.5
19	(United Kingdom) Guy Smith	(United Kingdom) Team LNT	12	9	5	Ret					12.5
20	(United Kingdom) Jordan King	(United Kingdom) Team LNT			4	Ret					12
21	(Denmark) Anders Fjordbach	(Denmark) High Class Racing	11	7	11	10	10	10	Ret		11
21	(United States) Mark Patterson	(Denmark) High Class Racing	11	7	11	10	10	10	Ret		11
21	(Japan) Kenta Yamashita	(Denmark) High Class Racing	11	7	11	10	10	10	Ret		11
22	(United Kingdom) Oliver Jarvis	(United Kingdom) Team LNT	12								8.5
22	(United Kingdom) Oliver Jarvis	(United Kingdom) United Autosports		6							8.5
23	(Republic of Ireland) Ryan Cullen	(China) Jackie Chan DC Racing						9			2
24	(Italy) Luca Ghiotto	(United Kingdom) Team LNT		11							0.5
25	(United States) Chris Dyson	(United Kingdom) Team LNT				Ret					0
Pos.	Driver	Team	SIL (United Kingdom)	FUJ (Japan)	SHA (China)	BHR (Bahrain)	COA (United States)	SPA (Belgium)	LMS (France)	BHR (Bahrain)	Points

Colour	Result
Gold	Winner
Silver	Second place
Bronze	Third place
Green	Points classification
Blue	Non-points classification
Blue	Non-classified finish (NC)
Purple	Retired, not classified (Ret)
Red	Did not qualify (DNQ)
Red	Did not pre-qualify (DNPQ)
Black	Disqualified (DSQ)
White	Did not start (DNS)
White	Withdrew (WD)
White	Race cancelled (C)
Blank	Did not practice (DNP)
Blank	Did not arrive (DNA)
Blank	Excluded (EX)

**Bold** - Pole position

==== World Endurance GTE Drivers' Championship ====
Pos.	Driver	Team	SIL (United Kingdom)	FUJ (Japan)	SHA (China)	BHR (Bahrain)	COA (United States)	SPA (Belgium)	LMS (France)	BHR (Bahrain)	Points
1	(Denmark) Marco Sørensen	(United Kingdom) Aston Martin Racing	5	1	5	1	**1**	2	3	5	172
1	(Denmark) Nicki Thiim	(United Kingdom) Aston Martin Racing	5	1	5	1	**1**	2	3	5	172
2	(Belgium) Maxime Martin	(United Kingdom) Aston Martin Racing	3	3	4	3	4	3	1	4	160
3	(Denmark) Michael Christensen	(Germany) Porsche GT Team	2	2	**2**	7	2	**1**	11	**1**	148
3	(France) Kévin Estre	(Germany) Porsche GT Team	2	2	**2**	7	2	**1**	11	**1**	148
4	(United Kingdom) Alex Lynn	(United Kingdom) Aston Martin Racing	3	3	4	3	4	3	1		142
5	(United Kingdom) James Calado	(Italy) AF Corse	**4**	4	1	4	3	4	2	12	132
6	(Italy) Alessandro Pier Guidi	(Italy) AF Corse	**4**	4	1	4	3	4	2		131
7	(Italy) Gianmaria Bruni	(Germany) Porsche GT Team	1	**6**	3	**5**	8	5	**9**	2	111
7	(Austria) Richard Lietz	(Germany) Porsche GT Team	1	**6**	3	**5**	8	5	**9**	2	111
8	(Spain) Miguel Molina	(Italy) AF Corse	Ret	5	6	2	5	6	NC	3	86
8	(Italy) Davide Rigon	(Italy) AF Corse	Ret	5	6	2	5	6	NC	3	86
9	(United Kingdom) Harry Tincknell	(United Kingdom) Aston Martin Racing							1		50
10	(United Kingdom) Richard Westbrook	(United Kingdom) Aston Martin Racing							3	4	48
11	(United Kingdom) Jonathan Adam	(United Kingdom) TF Sport	12	7	7	Ret	6	9	4	14	47.5
11	(Republic of Ireland) Charlie Eastwood	(United Kingdom) TF Sport	12	7	7	Ret	6	9	4	14	47.5
11	(Turkey) Salih Yoluç	(United Kingdom) TF Sport	12	7	7	Ret	6	9	4	14	47.5
12	(France) Emmanuel Collard	(Italy) AF Corse	6	8	10	10	10	7	6	7	47
12	(Denmark) Nicklas Nielsen	(Italy) AF Corse	6	8	10	10	10	7	6	7	47
12	(France) François Perrodo	(Italy) AF Corse	6	8	10	10	10	7	6	7	47
13	(Netherlands) Larry ten Voorde	(Germany) Team Project 1			8	6			7	6	40
14	(Brazil) Daniel Serra	(Italy) AF Corse							2	12	37
15	(Norway) Egidio Perfetti	(Germany) Team Project 1	11	13	11	15	9	10	7	6	29.5
16	(Italy) Riccardo Pera	(Germany) Dempsey-Proton Racing	10	11	17	12	11	8	5	13	28.5
16	(Germany) Christian Ried	(Germany) Dempsey-Proton Racing	10	11	17	12	11	8	5	13	28.5
17	(Australia) Matt Campbell	(Germany) Dempsey-Proton Racing	10	11	17	12	11	8	5		27.5
18	(Canada) Paul Dalla Lana	(United Kingdom) Aston Martin Racing	7	17	9	8	7	15	10	15	24
18	(United Kingdom) Ross Gunn	(United Kingdom) Aston Martin Racing	7	17	9	8	7	15	10	15	24
19	(Netherlands) Jeroen Bleekemolen	(Germany) Team Project 1	15	9	8	6	17	12	13	11	21.5
19	(United States) Ben Keating	(Germany) Team Project 1	15	9	8	6	17	12	13	11	21.5
20	(United Kingdom) Darren Turner	(United Kingdom) Aston Martin Racing	7	17	9	8	7				20.5
21	(Italy) Matteo Cairoli	(Germany) Team Project 1	11	13	11	15	9	10	7		17.5
22	(United Kingdom) Ben Barker	(United Kingdom) Gulf Racing	9	14	15	9	12	16	8	10	17
22	(United Kingdom) Michael Wainwright	(United Kingdom) Gulf Racing	9	14	15	9	12	16	8	10	17
23	(United Kingdom) Andrew Watson	(United Kingdom) Gulf Racing	9	14	15	9	12	16	8		15
24	(Germany) Jörg Bergmeister	(Germany) Team Project 1								6	12
25	(Japan) Kei Cozzolino	(Japan) MR Racing	8	10	13	13	16		Ret		8
25	(Japan) Kei Cozzolino	(United Kingdom) Red River Sport								16	8
Pos.	Driver	Team	SIL (United Kingdom)	FUJ (Japan)	SHA (China)	BHR (Bahrain)	COA (United States)	SPA (Belgium)	LMS (France)	BHR (Bahrain)	Points

==== Endurance Trophy for LMP2 Drivers ====
Pos.	Driver	Team	SIL (United Kingdom)	FUJ (Japan)	SHA (China)	BHR (Bahrain)	COA (United States)	SPA (Belgium)	LMS (France)	BHR (Bahrain)	Points
1	(Portugal) Filipe Albuquerque	(United Kingdom) United Autosports	Ret	3	3	**1**	1	**1**	**1**	**4**	190
1	(United Kingdom) Phil Hanson	(United Kingdom) United Autosports	Ret	3	3	**1**	1	**1**	**1**	**4**	190
2	(United Kingdom) Paul di Resta	(United Kingdom) United Autosports	Ret		3	**1**	1	**1**	**1**	**4**	175
3	(Portugal) António Félix da Costa	(United Kingdom) Jota Sport	5	DSQ	1	2	3	4	2	2	152
3	(Mexico) Roberto González	(United Kingdom) Jota Sport	5	DSQ	1	2	3	4	2	2	152
4	(United Kingdom) Anthony Davidson	(United Kingdom) Jota Sport		DSQ	1	2	3	4	2	2	142
5	(United Kingdom) Will Stevens	(China) Jackie Chan DC Racing	4	**2**	2	3	2	6	DSQ	1	136
5	(China) Ho-Pin Tung	(China) Jackie Chan DC Racing	4	**2**	2	3	2	6	DSQ	1	136
6	(Netherlands) Giedo van der Garde	(Netherlands) Racing Team Nederland	**3**	1	5	5	5	3	6	3	130
6	(Netherlands) Frits van Eerd	(Netherlands) Racing Team Nederland	**3**	1	5	5	5	3	6	3	130
7	(France) Gabriel Aubry	(China) Jackie Chan DC Racing	4	**2**	2	3	2	WD	DSQ	1	128
8	(France) Thomas Laurent	(France) Signatech Alpine Elf	2	6	4	4	6	Ret	3	5	109
8	(Brazil) André Negrão	(France) Signatech Alpine Elf	2	6	4	4	6	Ret	3	5	109
8	(France) Pierre Ragues	(France) Signatech Alpine Elf	2	6	4	4	6	Ret	3	5	109
9	(Switzerland) Antonin Borga	(Switzerland) Cool Racing	1	5	**Ret**	6	**4**	2	4		103
9	(France) Nicolas Lapierre	(Switzerland) Cool Racing	1	5	**Ret**	6	**4**	2	4		103
10	(Netherlands) Nyck de Vries	(Netherlands) Racing Team Nederland		1	5	5	5		6	3	99
11	(Switzerland) Alexandre Coigny	(Switzerland) Cool Racing	WD	5	**Ret**	6	**4**	2	4		78
12	(Italy) Andrea Belicchi	(Italy) Cetilar Racing	6	7	7	8	8	5	5	6	72
12	(Italy) Roberto Lacorte	(Italy) Cetilar Racing	6	7	7	8	8	5	5	6	72
12	(Italy) Giorgio Sernagiotto	(Italy) Cetilar Racing	6	7	7	8	8	5	5	6	72
13	(Denmark) Anders Fjordbach	(Denmark) High Class Racing	7	4	6	7	7	7	Ret		47
13	(United States) Mark Patterson	(Denmark) High Class Racing	7	4	6	7	7	7	Ret		47
13	(Japan) Kenta Yamashita	(Denmark) High Class Racing	7	4	6	7	7	7	Ret		47
14	(Netherlands) Job van Uitert	(Netherlands) Racing Team Nederland	**3**					3			31
15	(United Kingdom) Oliver Jarvis	(United Kingdom) United Autosports		3							15
16	(Republic of Ireland) Ryan Cullen	(China) Jackie Chan DC Racing						6			8
Pos.	Driver	Team	SIL (United Kingdom)	FUJ (Japan)	SHA (China)	BHR (Bahrain)	COA (United States)	SPA (Belgium)	LMS (France)	BHR (Bahrain)	Points

==== Endurance Trophy for GTE Am Drivers ====
Pos.	Driver	Team	SIL (United Kingdom)	FUJ (Japan)	SHA (China)	BHR (Bahrain)	COA (United States)	SPA (Belgium)	LMS (France)	BHR (Bahrain)	Points
1	(France) Emmanuel Collard	(Italy) AF Corse	1	2	4	4	4	1	3	2	167
1	(Denmark) Nicklas Nielsen	(Italy) AF Corse	1	2	4	4	4	1	3	2	167
1	(France) François Perrodo	(Italy) AF Corse	1	2	4	4	4	1	3	2	167
2	(United Kingdom) Jonathan Adam	(United Kingdom) TF Sport	**7**	**1**	1	Ret	1	3	1	8	154
2	(Republic of Ireland) Charlie Eastwood	(United Kingdom) TF Sport	**7**	**1**	1	Ret	1	3	1	8	154
2	(Turkey) Salih Yoluç	(United Kingdom) TF Sport	**7**	**1**	1	Ret	1	3	1	8	154
3	(Netherlands) Larry ten Voorde	(Germany) Team Project 1			2	**1**			4	1	119
4	(Norway) Egidio Perfetti	(Germany) Team Project 1	6	7	**5**	9	**3**	4	4	1	118
5	(Italy) Riccardo Pera	(Germany) Dempsey-Proton Racing	5	5	11	6	5	**2**	**2**	7	107.5
5	(Germany) Christian Ried	(Germany) Dempsey-Proton Racing	5	5	11	6	5	**2**	**2**	7	107.5
6	(Netherlands) Jeroen Bleekemolen	(Germany) Team Project 1	10	3	2	**1**	11	6	8	6	101.5
6	(United States) Ben Keating	(Germany) Team Project 1	10	3	2	**1**	11	6	8	6	101.5
7	(Canada) Paul Dalla Lana	(United Kingdom) Aston Martin Racing	2	11	3	2	2	9	6	**9**	100.5
7	(United Kingdom) Ross Gunn	(United Kingdom) Aston Martin Racing	2	11	3	2	2	9	6	**9**	100.5
8	(Australia) Matt Campbell	(Germany) Dempsey-Proton Racing	5	5	11	6	5	**2**	**2**		98.5
9	(United Kingdom) Ben Barker	(United Kingdom) Gulf Racing	4	8	9	3	6	10	5	5	85
9	(United Kingdom) Michael Wainwright	(United Kingdom) Gulf Racing	4	8	9	3	6	10	5	5	85
10	(Italy) Matteo Cairoli	(Germany) Team Project 1	6	7	**5**	9	**3**	4	4		80
11	(United Kingdom) Darren Turner	(United Kingdom) Aston Martin Racing	2	11	3	2	2				78.5
12	(Italy) Francesco Castellacci	(Italy) AF Corse	9	6	8	5	7	7	7	4	71
12	(Italy) Giancarlo Fisichella	(Italy) AF Corse	9	6	8	5	7	7	7	4	71
12	(Switzerland) Thomas Flohr	(Italy) AF Corse	9	6	8	5	7	7	7	4	71
13	(United Kingdom) Andrew Watson	(United Kingdom) Gulf Racing	4	8	9	3	6	10	5		70
14	(Japan) Kei Cozzolino	(Japan) MR Racing	3	4	7	7	10		Ret		45
14	(Japan) Kei Cozzolino	(United Kingdom) Red River Sport								10	45
15	(Monaco) Olivier Beretta	(Japan) MR Racing	3	4	7	7	10				43
15	(Japan) Motoaki Ishikawa	(Japan) MR Racing	3	4	7	7	10				43
16	(Germany) Jörg Bergmeister	(Germany) Team Project 1								1	38
17	(Brazil) Felipe Fraga	(Germany) Team Project 1	10	3			11	6	8		32.5
18	(Germany) Laurents Hörr	(Germany) Team Project 1					**3**	4			28
19	(United Kingdom) Bonamy Grimes	(United Kingdom) Red River Sport	8	10	10	8	8	8	9	10	26
20	(United Kingdom) Charles Hollings	(United Kingdom) Red River Sport	8	10	10	8	8	8	9		24
20	(United Kingdom) Johnny Mowlem	(United Kingdom) Red River Sport	8	10	10	8	8	8	9		24
21	(United Arab Emirates) Khaled Al Qubaisi	(Germany) Dempsey-Proton Racing				Ret				3	23
21	(New Zealand) Jaxon Evans	(Germany) Dempsey-Proton Racing								3	23
21	(Germany) Marco Holzer	(Germany) Dempsey-Proton Racing								3	23
22	(Denmark) David Heinemeier Hansson	(Germany) Team Project 1		7	**5**	9					20
23	(Brazil) Augusto Farfus	(United Kingdom) Aston Martin Racing						9	6		18
24	(Belgium) Alessio Picariello	(United Kingdom) Gulf Racing								5	15
25	(Austria) Thomas Preining	(Germany) Dempsey-Proton Racing	11	9	6	Ret	9		NC		12.5
Pos.	Driver	Team	SIL (United Kingdom)	FUJ (Japan)	SHA (China)	BHR (Bahrain)	COA (United States)	SPA (Belgium)	LMS (France)	BHR (Bahrain)	Points

=== Manufacturers' and teams' championships ===
A world championship was awarded for LMGTE manufacturers and for LMP1 teams. FIA Endurance Trophies were awarded for LMP2 and LMGTE Am teams.

==== World Endurance LMP1 Championship ====
Points were awarded only for the highest finishing competitor from each team.

Pos.	Team	SIL (United Kingdom)	FUJ (Japan)	SHA (China)	BHR (Bahrain)	COA (United States)	SPA (Belgium)	LMS (France)	BHR (Bahrain)	Points
1	(Japan) Toyota Gazoo Racing	**1**	**1**	2	1	2	1	**1**	**1**	241
2	(Switzerland) Rebellion Racing	9	3	**1**	**3**	**1**	**3**	2		145
3	(United Kingdom) Team LNT	3	9	4	Ret					29

==== World Endurance GTE Manufacturers' Championship ====
The two highest finishing competitors from each manufacturer were awarded points.

Pos.	Manufacturer	SIL (United Kingdom)	FUJ (Japan)	SHA (China)	BHR (Bahrain)	COA (United States)	SPA (Belgium)	LMS (France)	BHR (Bahrain)	Points
1	(United Kingdom) Aston Martin	3	1	4	1	**1**	2	1	4	332
1	(United Kingdom) Aston Martin	5	3	5	3	4	3	3	5	332
2	(Germany) Porsche	1	2	**2**	**5**	2	**1**	**5**	**1**	289
2	(Germany) Porsche	2	**6**	3	6	8	5	6	2	289
3	(Italy) Ferrari	**4**	4	1	2	3	4	2	3	250
3	(Italy) Ferrari	6	5	6	4	5	6	7	7	250

==== Endurance Trophy for LMP2 Teams ====
Pos.	Car	Team	SIL (United Kingdom)	FUJ (Japan)	SHA (China)	BHR (Bahrain)	COA (United States)	SPA (Belgium)	LMS (France)	BHR (Bahrain)	Points
1	22	(United Kingdom) United Autosports	Ret	3	3	**1**	1	**1**	**1**	**4**	190
2	38	(United Kingdom) Jota Sport	5	DSQ	1	2	3	4	2	2	152
3	37	(China) Jackie Chan DC Racing	4	**2**	2	3	2	6	DSQ	1	136
4	29	(Netherlands) Racing Team Nederland	**3**	1	5	5	5	3	6	3	130
5	36	(France) Signatech Alpine Elf	2	6	4	4	6	Ret	3	5	109
6	42	(Switzerland) Cool Racing	1	5	**Ret**	6	**4**	2	4		103
7	47	(Italy) Cetilar Racing	6	7	7	8	8	5	5	6	72
8	33	(Denmark) High Class Racing	7	4	6	7	7	7	Ret		47

==== Endurance Trophy for GTE Am Teams ====
Pos.	Car	Team	SIL (United Kingdom)	FUJ (Japan)	SHA (China)	BHR (Bahrain)	COA (United States)	SPA (Belgium)	LMS (France)	BHR (Bahrain)	Points
1	83	(Italy) AF Corse	1	2	4	4	4	1	3	2	167
2	90	(United Kingdom) TF Sport	**7**	**1**	1	Ret	1	3	1	8	154
3	56	(Germany) Team Project 1	6	7	**5**	9	**3**	4	4	1	118
4	77	(Germany) Dempsey-Proton Racing	5	5	11	6	5	**2**	**2**	7	107.5
5	57	(Germany) Team Project 1	10	3	2	**1**	11	6	8	6	101.5
6	98	(United Kingdom) Aston Martin Racing	2	11	3	2	2	9	6	**9**	100.5
7	86	(United Kingdom) Gulf Racing	4	8	9	3	6	10	5	5	85
8	54	(Italy) AF Corse	9	6	8	5	7	7	7	4	71
9	88	(Germany) Dempsey-Proton Racing	11	9	6	Ret	9	5	NC	3	45.5
10	70	(Japan) MR Racing	3	4	7	7	10		Ret		43
11	62	(United Kingdom) Red River Sport	8	10	10	8	8	8	9	10	26
