= Roberto Lacorte =

Italian entrepreneur

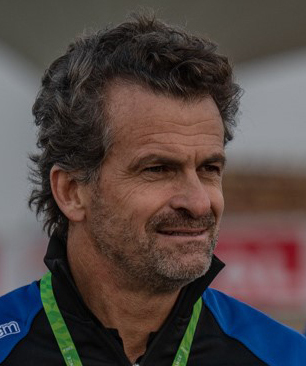
- Lacorte in 2019
- Nationality: (Italy) Italian
- Born: 25 June 1968 (age 58) Pisa, Italy
- Relatives: Nicola Lacorte (son)

FIA World Endurance Championship career
- Debut season: 2017
- Current team: Cetilar Racing
- Categorisation: FIA Bronze
- Car number: 47
- Starts: 14
- Wins: 1
- Podiums: 2
- Poles: 1

Previous series
- 2015 –2019: European Le Mans Series

Roberto Lacorte (born 25 June 1968) is an Italian entrepreneur, racing driver, and sailor. He owns and drives for Cetilar Racing in Hypercar, LMP2 and GT3 machinery.

== Business ventures ==
In 2003, Lacorte and brother Andrea founded the Pharmanutra Group, an Italian pharmaceutical company, of which he became vice president and CEO. The company's line of products includes Cetilar, a joint cream which provides title sponsorship to Lacorte's racing endeavors. The brand also provides sponsorship to a number of association football teams in Italy, notably holding primary shirt sponsorship with Parma.

== Sport ==
=== Motorsports ===
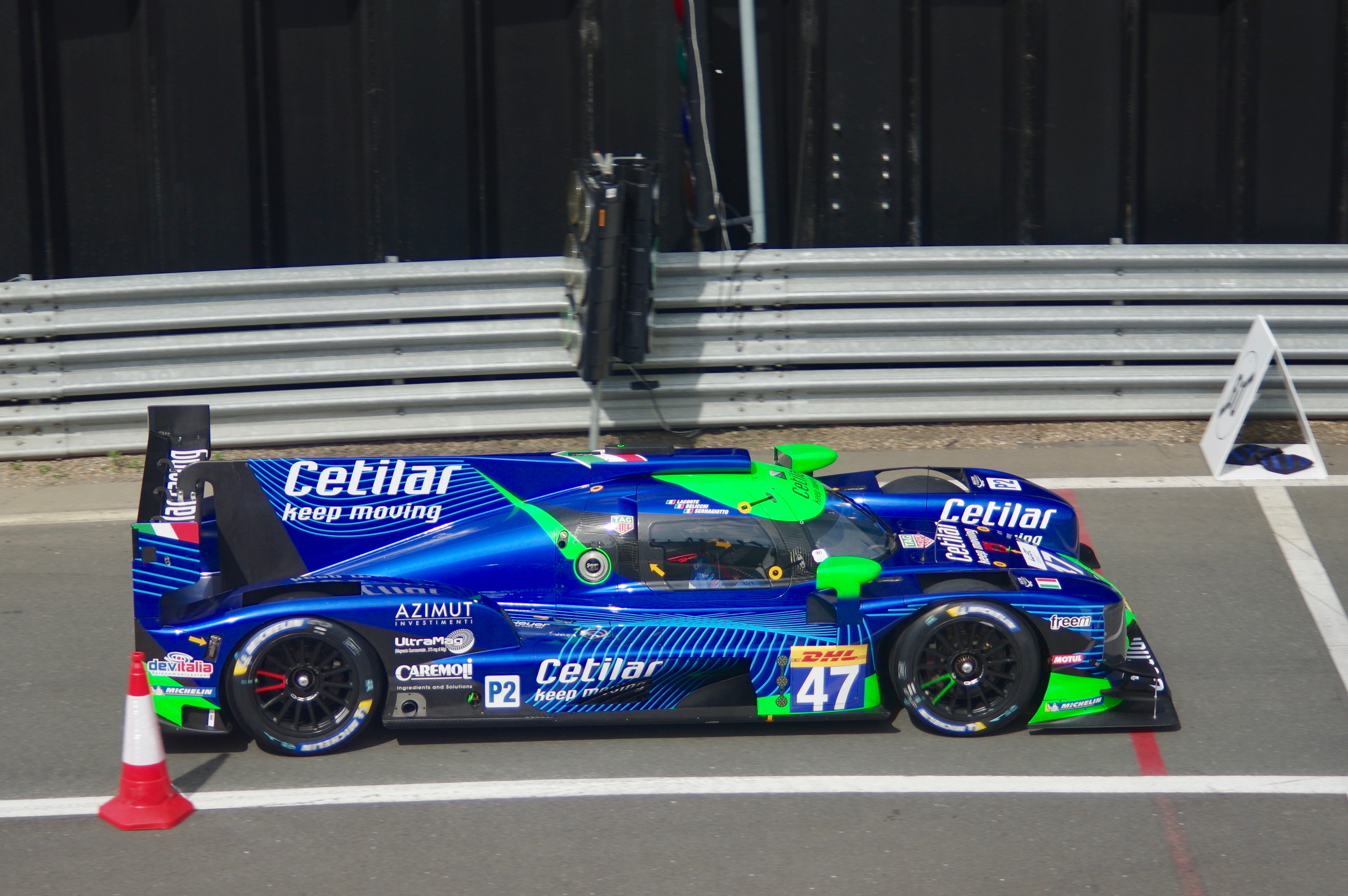
Lacorte's Cetilar Racing Dallara at Silverstone in 2019

Lacorte began his racing career in 2011, driving for Spider Racing Team in the Italian Superturismo Championship. The following season, he returned to the competition with co-driver Giorgio Sernagiotto, finishing third overall. In 2015, Lacorte began his partnership with Villorba Corse, taking part in the 2015 European Le Mans Series in the LMP3 class. By 2017, the partnership had led Lacorte to participate in his first ever 24 Hours of Le Mans, in which he finished seventh in class alongside co-drivers Andrea Belicchi and Giorgio Sernagiotto. The following year, Lacorte launched the Cetilar Academy, a youth karting program designed to advance drivers through the motorsport ladder. Early in 2019, Cetilar Racing stepped up to full-time entrant status for the 2019–20 FIA World Endurance Championship, fielding their Dallara P217 in the LMP2 class. The team would finish 12th in class over the course of the season, tallying 72 points.

Later that year, the team formed a partnership with AF Corse, who campaigned Ferrari's factory entries in the GTE Pro class. That alliance paved the way for Cetilar Racing's switch to the GTE Am category for the 2021 season. Alongside Cetilar Racing's GTE Am entry, Cetilar would provide sponsorship for the AF Corse GTE Pro entries for the duration of the season. Lacorte ended his LMP2 program due to his disappointment with the stratification plans that would reduce the horsepower and increase the minimum weight of LMP2 competitors, alongside the lack of competitiveness the Dallara chassis offered compared to the Oreca 07. The team's GTE transition proved immediately fruitful, as they finished on the class podium at Spa before claiming their first class victory in WEC competition at Portimão in June.

Ahead of the 2022 season, Cetilar Racing announced a full-season campaign in the GTD class of the IMSA SportsCar Championship, thereby temporarily ending the team's involvement in the WEC. While the full-season plan wouldn't pan out, the team remained in the series for the entire Michelin Endurance Cup. At the 12 Hours of Sebring, Lacorte and co-drivers Sernagiotto and Antonio Fuoco won the GTD class. For 2023, the team confirmed a return to the championship, taking part with Ferrari's new GT3 offering, the 296 GT3.

=== Sailing ===
Lacorte is an avid sailor, competing with his boat SuperNikka, which began development in 2013. In 2015, the boat competed for the first time at the 2015 edition of the 151Miglia, in which it finished second on corrected time. In its maiden year of competition, Lacorte piloted the boat to victory at the Maxi Yacht Rolex Cup, a feat which he repeated in 2017. In 2019, Lacorte was awarded the Italian Owner of the Year award at the FIV Italian Sailor of the Year awards. In December 2020, Lacorte announced his plans to build the first new generation foil Mini Maxi vessel, dubbed FlyingNikka, set to debut in 2022. It has been given the highest IRC rating in history at 3.866.

As of April 2021, Lacorte serves as an officer of the International Maxi Association, serving as vice president of the Mini Maxi Racer category, the class in which his boat competes.

== Personal life ==
Lacorte has a son, Nicola, who is also a racing driver and a former member of the Alpine Academy. The two drove together in a Ferrari 296 GT3 at the 2025 24 Hours of Daytona.

== Racing record ==
=== Career summary ===
Season	Series	Team	Races	Wins	Poles	F/Laps	Podiums	Points	Position
2013	Speed EuroSeries	MSR Corse	2	1	0	0	2	26	8th
2013	V de V Endurance Challenge – Proto – Scratch	MSR Corse	4	0	0	0	1	37	27th
2014	V de V Endurance Challenge – Proto – Scratch	MSR Corse	3	0	0	0	0	12.5	38th
2015	European Le Mans Series – LMP3	Villorba Corse	4	0	0	0	2	36	7th
2016	European Le Mans Series – LMP3	Villorba Corse	6	0	0	0	0	8	23rd
2016	Road to Le Mans – LMP3	Scuderia Villorba Corse	1	0	0	0	0	N/A	17th
2017	European Le Mans Series – LMP2	Cetilar Villorba Corse	6	0	0	0	0	35	14th
2017	24 Hours of Le Mans – LMP2	Cetilar Villorba Corse	1	0	0	0	0	N/A	7th
2018	European Le Mans Series – LMP2	Cetilar Villorba Corse	6	0	0	0	0	4.5	25th
2018	24 Hours of Le Mans – LMP2	Cetilar Villorba Corse	1	0	0	0	0	N/A	11th
2019	European Le Mans Series – LMP2	Cetilar Racing Villorba Corse	1	0	0	0	0	0	36th
2019	24 Hours of Le Mans – LMP2	Cetilar Racing Villorba Corse	1	0	0	0	0	N/A	13th
2019-20	FIA World Endurance Championship – LMP2	Cetilar Racing	8	0	0	0	0	72	12th
2020	24 Hours of Le Mans – LMP2	Cetilar Racing	1	0	0	0	0	N/A	11th
2021	FIA World Endurance Championship – GTE Am	Cetilar Racing	6	1	1	1	2	75	5th
2021	24 Hours of Le Mans – GTE Am	Cetilar Racing	1	0	0	0	0	N/A	DNF
2021	IMSA SportsCar Championship – LMP2	Cetilar Racing	2	0	0	0	0	0	NC
2022	IMSA SportsCar Championship – GTD	Cetilar Racing	4	1	0	2	1	1101	22nd
2023	IMSA SportsCar Championship – GTD	Cetilar Racing	4	0	0	0	0	637	38th
2023	24 Hours of Le Mans – LMP2	Graff Racing	1	0	0	0	0	N/A	17th
2024	IMSA SportsCar Championship – GTD	Cetilar Racing	5	0	0	0	1	1183	29th
2024	International GT Open	Cetilar Racing	2	0	0	0	0	0	59th
2025	IMSA SportsCar Championship – GTD	Cetilar Racing	2	0	1	0	0	367	54th
2025-26	Asian Le Mans Series - LMP2	Cetilar Racing	6	2	0	1	3	81	**2nd**
2026-27	Asian Le Mans Series - Hypercar	Cetilar Racing							

* Season still in progress

=== Complete FIA World Endurance Championship results ===
(key) (Races in bold indicate pole position; races in italics indicate fastest lap)

Year	Entrant	Class	Chassis	Engine	1	2	3	4	5	6	7	8	9	Rank	Points
2017	Cetilar Villorba Corse	LMP2	Dallara P217	Gibson GK428 4.2L V8	SIL	SPA	LMS; 7	NÜR	MEX	COA	FUJ	SHA	BHR	NC	0
2018–19	Cetilar Villorba Corse	LMP2	Dallara P217	Gibson GK428 4.2L V8	SPA	LMS; 11	SIL	FUJ	SHA	SEB	SPA	LMS; 13		NC	0
2019–20	Cetilar Racing	LMP2	Dallara P217	Gibson GK428 4.2L V8	SIL; 6	FUJ; 7	SHA; 7	BHR; 8	COA; 8	SPA; 5	LMS; 5	BHR; 6		12th	72
2021	Cetilar Racing	GTE Am	Ferrari 488 GTE Evo	Ferrari F154CB 3.9L Turbo V8	SPA; 3	POR; 1	MON; 10	LMS; Ret	BHR; 9	**BHR**; 4				5th	75

=== Complete WeatherTech SportsCar Championship results ===
(key) (Races in bold indicate pole position)

Year	Team	Class	Chassis	Engine	1	2	3	4	5	6	7	8	9	10	11	12	Rank	Points
2021	Cetilar Racing	LMP2	Dallara P217	Gibson GK428 4.2 L V8	DAY; 6	SEB	WGL	WGL	ELK	LGA	PET						NC	0
2022	Cetilar Racing	GTD	Ferrari 488 GT3 Evo 2020	Ferrari F154CB 3.9 L Turbo V8	DAY; 14	SEB; 1	LBH	LGA	MDO	DET	WGL; 4	MOS	LIM	ELK	VIR	PET; 10	22nd	1101
2023	Cetilar Racing	GTD	Ferrari 296 GT3	Ferrari 3.0 L Turbo V6	DAY; 23	SEB; 14	LBH	LGA	WGL; 18	MOS	LIM	ELK	VIR	IMS	PET; 13		38th	637
2024	Cetilar Racing	GTD	Ferrari 296 GT3	Ferrari 3.0 L Turbo V6	DAY; 10	**SEB**; 2	LBH	LGA	WGL; 18	MOS	ELK	VIR	IMS; 7	PET; 14			29th	1183
2025	Cetilar Racing	GTD	Ferrari 296 GT3	Ferrari 3.0 L Turbo V6	DAY; 20	SEB	LBH	LGA	WGL	MOS	ELK	VIR	IMS	**PET**; 10			54th	367

=== Complete 24 Hours of Le Mans results ===
Year	Team	Co-Drivers	Car	Class	Laps	Pos.	Class Pos.
2017	(Italy) Cetilar Villorba Corse	(Italy) Andrea Belicchi (Italy) Giorgio Sernagiotto	Dallara P217-Gibson	LMP2	353	9th	7th
2018	(Italy) Cetilar Villorba Corse	(Brazil) Felipe Nasr (Italy) Giorgio Sernagiotto	Dallara P217-Gibson	LMP2	342	19th	11th
2019	(Italy) Cetilar Racing Villorba Corse	(Italy) Andrea Belicchi (Italy) Giorgio Sernagiotto	Dallara P217-Gibson	LMP2	352	18th	13th
2020	(Italy) Cetilar Racing	(Italy) Andrea Belicchi (Italy) Giorgio Sernagiotto	Dallara P217-Gibson	LMP2	363	14th	11th
2021	(Italy) Cetilar Racing	(Italy) Antonio Fuoco (Italy) Giorgio Sernagiotto	Ferrari 488 GTE Evo	GTE Am	90	DNF	DNF
2023	(France) Graff Racing	(Netherlands) Giedo van der Garde (France) Patrick Pilet	Oreca 07-Gibson	LMP2	303	37th	16th
2023	(France) Graff Racing	(Netherlands) Giedo van der Garde (France) Patrick Pilet	Oreca 07-Gibson	LMP2 Pro-Am	303	37th	4th

=== Complete Asian Le Mans Series results ===
(key) (Races in bold indicate pole position) (Races in italics indicate fastest lap)

Year	Team	Car	Engine	Class	1	2	3	4	5	6	Pos.	Points
2025–26	Cetilar Racing	LMP2	Oreca 07	Gibson GK428 4.2 L V8	SEP; 1; 1	SEP; 2; 1	DUB; 1; 2	DUB; 2; 4	ABU; 1; 11	ABU; 2; 10	2nd	81
2026–27	Cetilar Racing	Hypercar	Ferrari 499P	Ferrari F163CG 3.0 L Turbo V6	**LEC**; **1**; 2	LEC; 2; 2	JER; 1	JER; 2	ALG; 1	ALG; 2	2nd*	37*
